= Bangladesh national football team results (unofficial matches) =

Football results

This is a list of the Bangladesh national football team results from 1972 to the present day that, for various reasons, are not accorded the status of official International A Matches.

== 1970s ==
=== 1972 ===
The Dhaka XI served as the unofficial Bangladesh national team throughout 1972, as the Bangladesh Football Federation would only attain AFC and FIFA recognition in 1973 and 1976, respectively.

13 May 1972 Friendly	Dhaka XI (Bangladesh)	1–0	(India) Mohun Bagan	Dhaka, Bangladesh
16:30 BST	Salahuddin 68'	Report		Stadium: Dhaka Stadium; Attendance: 35,000; Referee: Zahurul Alam (Bangladesh)

21 August 1972 1972 Bordoloi Trophy G.S	George Telegraph (India)	0–2	(Bangladesh) Dhaka XI	Guwahati, India
			Nowsher (?); Salahuddin (?)	Stadium: Nehru Stadium

23 August 1972 1972 Bordoloi Trophy G.S	Assam Railways (India)	1–4	(Bangladesh) Dhaka XI	Guwahati, India
			Nowsher (?); Salahuddin (?); Pratap (?)	Stadium: Nehru Stadium

25 August 1972 1972 Bordoloi Trophy S.F 1	Kolkata Mohammedan (India)	Abandoned	(Bangladesh) Dhaka XI	Guwahati, India
				Stadium: Nehru Stadium
Note: Match abandoned with the score 0-0 after 70 minutes due to heavy rain

27 August 1972 1972 Bordoloi Trophy S.F 1	Kolkata Mohammedan (India)	0–0	(Bangladesh) Dhaka XI	Guwahati, India
				Stadium: Nehru Stadium

29 August 1972 1972 Bordoloi Trophy S.F 2	Kolkata Mohammedan (India)	0–0 (a.e.t.) (5–5 p)	(Bangladesh) Dhaka XI	Guwahati, India
				Stadium: Nehru Stadium
Note: Kolkata Mohammedan were disqualified after refusing to continue the penalty shoot-out

31 August 1972 1972 Bordoloi Trophy Final 1	East Bengal (India)	0–0	(Bangladesh) Dhaka XI	Guwahati, India
				Stadium: Nehru Stadium

1 September 1972 1972 Bordoloi Trophy Final 2	East Bengal (India)	5–1	(Bangladesh) Dhaka XI	Guwahati, India
			Tipu (?)	Stadium: Nehru Stadium

4 September 1972 Friendly	Shillong XI (India)	1–1	(Bangladesh) Dhaka XI	Guwahati, India
			Tipu (?)	Stadium: Nehru Stadium

5 September 1972 Friendly	DC Shillong XI (India)	1–2	(Bangladesh) Dhaka XI	Guwahati, India
			Nannu (?); Tipu (?)	Stadium: Nehru Stadium

5 October 1972 Friendly	Dhaka XI (Bangladesh)	0–0	(India) East Bengal	Dhaka, Bangladesh
				Stadium: Dhaka Stadium

11 October 1972 Friendly	Dhaka XI (Bangladesh)	0–0	(India) East Bengal	Dhaka, Bangladesh
				Stadium: Dhaka Stadium

=== 1973 ===
15 August 1973 Friendly	FAS President's XI	2–0	Bangladesh	Singapore
	Yusoff 47'; Nasfee 59'	Report		Stadium: National Stadium

Dinamo Minsk from the Soviet Union arrived in Dhaka on 5 November 1973 to play four exhibition matches. The 23-member team consisted of 3 players from the Soviet Union Olympic team. They played against the unofficial national team, Dhaka XI, on 6 November 1973. Aside from that game, they defeated Comilla XI 7–0 on 9 November, Jessore XI 9–0 on 11 November and Dhaka Metropolis XI 3–0 in their final game in Dhaka on 14 November.

6 November 1973 Friendly	Dinamo Minsk (Soviet Union)	7–0	(Bangladesh) Dhaka XI	Dhaka, Bangladesh
18:30 UTC+8	Klimovich 22', 53'; Kurnev 29' (?), 59'; ? (?); Vasiliev 80'	Report		Stadium: Dhaka Stadium; Attendance: 45,000; Referee: Zahurul Alam (Bangladesh)

=== 1976 ===
20 December 1976 1976 King's Cup	Thailand B	2–0	Bangladesh	Bangkok, Thailand
	Dara (?), 61'	Report		Stadium: 5,000

December 1976 Friendly	Royal Thai Army (Thailand)	0–1	Bangladesh	Bangkok, Thailand
			Ali (?)

=== 1979 ===
20 July 1979 International Friendly	Bangladesh	0–1	South Korea B	Dhaka, Bangladesh
		Report	Jeong Hyeon-bok 20'	Stadium: Dhaka Stadium; Referee: Dalil Khan (Bangladesh)

== 1980s ==
=== 1981 ===
2 April 1981 1981 President's Gold Cup G.S	Bangladesh Green	3–1	(Iraq) Combined Baghdad XI	Dhaka, Bangladesh
	Chunnu 33'; Salahuddin 53', 88'	Report	Razzak 69'	Stadium: Dhaka Stadium; Referee: Sambeh Achu (Oman)

4 April 1981 1981 President's Gold Cup G.S	Bangladesh Green	1–1	(North Korea) Pyongyang SC	Dhaka, Bangladesh
	Tutul 76'		Kim Jong Man 25'	Stadium: Dhaka Stadium; Referee: Bameshwar Rawat (Nepal)

6 April 1981 1981 President's Gold Cup S.F	Bangladesh Green	2–5	(South Korea) Seoul CIty Hall	Dhaka, Bangladesh
	Salahuddin 73', 79'	Report	Kwon Oh-son 4'; Park Eun Gi 23', 85', 90'; Son Jeung Sook 67'	Stadium: Dhaka Stadium; Referee: Bameshwar Rawat (Nepal)

=== 1982 ===
15 February 1982 1982 Quaid-e-Azam International Tournament G.S	Pakistan Blue	2–1	Bangladesh	Karachi, Pakistan
	Zulfiqar 59'; Anwar 73'	Report	Murshedy 46'	Stadium: National Stadium; Referee: Shrestha (Nepal)

22 February 1982 1982 Quaid-e-Azam International Tournament G.S	Shandong (China)	0–0	Bangladesh	Karachi, Pakistan
		Report		Stadium: National Stadium; Referee: Sardar Ali Dara (Pakistan)

21 August 1982 1982 President's Gold Cup G.S	Bangladesh Red	0–0	Iran Youth	Dhaka, Bangladesh
		Report		Stadium: Dhaka Stadium

23 August 1982 1982 President's Gold Cup G.S	Bangladesh Red	0–1	(South Korea) Konkuk University	Dhaka, Bangladesh
		Report	Yung Kook 57'	Stadium: Dhaka Stadium

27 August 1982 1982 President's Gold Cup G.S	Bangladesh Red	0–1	Thailand Youth	Dhaka, Bangladesh
		Report	Panomai 70'	Stadium: Dhaka Stadium; Referee: AM Bhatti (Pakistan)

24 October 1982 Friendly	Bangladesh	3–0	(Bangladesh) Dhaka XI	Dhaka, Bangladesh
	Badal (?); Murshedy (?); Alok (?)			Stadium: Dhaka Stadium

=== 1983 ===
27 August 1983 1983 President's Gold Cup G.S	Bangladesh Red	0–0	(Iraq) Al-Shorta	Dhaka, Bangladesh
		Report		Stadium: Dhaka Stadium

1 September 1983 1983 President's Gold Cup G.S	Bangladesh Red	2–2	(South Korea) Dong-A University	Dhaka, Bangladesh
	Aslam (?); Ashish (?)	Report	Kim Tae Won (?); Yang Pu Yung (?)	Stadium: Dhaka Stadium

16 September 1983 1983 Merdeka Tournament	Primera B Metropolitana XI (Argentina)	5–2	Bangladesh	Kuala Lumpur, Malaysia
	Fernandez 6', 8', 37'; Colombatti 16'; Delbono 56'	Report	Chunnu 21' (pen.); Aslam 29'	Stadium: Stadium Merdeka

24 September 1983 1983 Merdeka Tournament	Algeria XI	1–0	Bangladesh	Kuala Lumpur, Malaysia
	Unknown 74'	Report		Stadium: Stadium Merdeka

26 September 1983 1983 Merdeka Tournament	South Korea B	3–1	Bangladesh	Ipoh, Malaysia
	Unknown 2'; Unknown 54'; Unknown 64'	Report	Chunnu 88'

=== 1985 ===
30 April 1985 1985 Quaid-e-Azam International Tournament G.S	Pakistan White	0–3	Bangladesh	Peshawar, Pakistan
		Report	Babul 22'; Chunnu 40'; Elias 85+'	Stadium: Arbab Niaz Stadium

6 May 1985 Friendly	Habib Bank (Pakistan)	0–0	Bangladesh	Karachi, Pakistan
				Stadium: KMC Stadium

=== 1986 ===
18 January 1986 1986 President's Gold Cup G.S	Bangladesh Red	1–1	Syria B	Dhaka, Bangladesh
	Liton (?)	Report	Kaiser (?)	Stadium: Dhaka Stadium

20 January 1986 1986 President's Gold Cup G.S	Bangladesh Red	1–2	(Switzerland) Vevey Sports	Dhaka, Bangladesh
	Aslam (?)	Report	Pavoni (?); Siebenthal (?)	Stadium: Dhaka Stadium

22 January 1986 1986 President's Gold Cup G.S	Bangladesh Red	0–1	(China) Beijing	Dhaka, Bangladesh
		Report	Tang Pengju 42'	Stadium: Dhaka Stadium

24 January 1986 1986 President's Gold Cup G.S	Bangladesh Red	3–1	(Finland) Turun Palloseura	Dhaka, Bangladesh
	Aslam 8', 25', 76'	Report	Paavola 7'	Stadium: Dhaka Stadium

26 January 1986 1986 President's Gold Cup G.S	Bangladesh Red	1–2	(North Korea) Wolmido	Dhaka, Bangladesh
	Elias (?)	Report	Lee Jong (?); Cho Go Yang (?)	Stadium: Dhaka Stadium

27 January 1986 1986 President's Gold Cup G.S	Bangladesh Red	0–0	Bangladesh Green	Dhaka, Bangladesh
		Report		Stadium: Dhaka Stadium

7 March 1986 1986 Pakistan President's Gold Cup	President XI (Pakistan)	4–1	Bangladesh	Karachi, Pakistan
	Sarwar (?); Din Mohammed (?)	Report	Kaiser (?)	Stadium: National Stadium

9 March 1986 1986 Pakistan President's Gold Cup	Shenyang Army Unit (China)	0–0	Bangladesh	Karachi, Pakistan
		Report		Stadium: National Stadium

11 March 1986 1986 Pakistan President's Gold Cup	Pakistan Customs	1–1	Bangladesh	Karachi, Pakistan
	Zahid (?)	Report	Kamal (?)	Stadium: National Stadium

13 March 1986 1986 Pakistan President's Gold Cup	Mazandaran Province (Iran)	0–1	Bangladesh	Karachi, Pakistan
		Report	Munna (?)	Stadium: National Stadium

3 December 1986 1986 Nepal Panchayat Silver Jubilee Cup	Denmark XI	3–0	Bangladesh	Kathmandu, Nepal
		Report		Stadium: Dasarath Rangasala Stadium

=== 1987 ===
10 February 1987 1987 President's Gold Cup G.S	Bangladesh White	0–1	(Soviet Union) Fakel Voronezh	Dhaka, Bangladesh
		Report	Miliuria 42'	Stadium: Dhaka Stadium

12 February 1987 1987 President's Gold Cup G.S	Bangladesh White	2–0	(India) East Bengal	Dhaka, Bangladesh
	Das 62'; Manu 79'	Report		Stadium: Dhaka Stadium

15 February 1987 1987 President's Gold Cup S.F	Bangladesh White	1–1 (3–4 p)	(China) Guangdong	Dhaka, Bangladesh
	Manu (?)	Report	Qao Yang (?)	Stadium: Dhaka Stadium
	Penalties
	Kaiser (penalty scored); Badal (penalty scored); Manu (penalty scored); Abul (penalty missed); Emily (penalty missed)		Penalty scored

22 February 1987 Friendly	BFF XI (Bangladesh)	0–5	(Soviet Union) Fakel Voronezh	Dhaka, Bangladesh
		Report		Stadium: Dhaka Stadium

18 September 1987 1987 Quaid-e-Azam International Tournament G.S	Nepal XI	0–2	(Bangladesh) BFF XI	Lahore, Pakistan
		Report	Das 68'; Zia Babu 83'

19 September 1987 1987 Quaid-e-Azam International Tournament G.S	Pakistan White	1–1	(Bangladesh) BFF XI	Lahore, Pakistan
	Sarwar 85'	Report	Azmat 63'

21 September 1987 1987 Quaid-e-Azam International Tournament G.S	Pakistan Blue	0–0	(Bangladesh) BFF XI	Lahore, Pakistan
		Report

23 September 1987 1987 Quaid-e-Azam International Tournament S.F	Guangzhou (China)	2–0	(Bangladesh) BFF XI	Lahore, Pakistan
	Wu Qunli 31'; Wang Chang 51'	Report

24 September 1987 1987 Quaid-e-Azam International Tournament Third Place	Pakistan Green	Cancelled; Walkover	(Bangladesh) BFF XI	Lahore, Pakistan
		Report
Note: Cancelled by request of the Bangladesh delegation - Pakistan Green won the third place by default

=== 1989 ===
21 May 1989 1989 President's Gold Cup G.S	Bangladesh Red	1–1	Thailand B	Dhaka, Bangladesh
	Aslam (?)	Report	Rakha (?)	Stadium: Mirpur Stadium

25 May 1989 1989 President's Gold Cup G.S	Bangladesh Red	0–0	Iran B	Dhaka, Bangladesh
		Report		Stadium: Mirpur Stadium

28 May 1989 1989 President's Gold Cup S.F	Bangladesh Red	1–0	Bangladesh Green	Dhaka, Bangladesh
	Sabbir (?)	Report		Stadium: Mirpur Stadium

31 May 1989 1989 President's Gold Cup Final	Bangladesh Red	1–1 (4–3 p)	(South Korea) Korea University	Dhaka, Bangladesh
	Aslam 53'	Report	Seo Jung-won 87'	Stadium: Mirpur Stadium; Attendance: 47,345; Referee: Sagar Sen (India)
	Penalties
	Kaiser (penalty scored); Aslam (penalty scored); Rumi (penalty scored); Sabbir (penalty scored)		Huh Ki-tae (penalty scored); Hong Myung-bo (penalty scored); Kim Byung-soo (penalty scored); ? (penalty missed); ? (penalty missed)

5 June 1989 Friendly	Bangladesh NSC XI	2–0	(United States) Seahorses	Dhaka, Bangladesh
	Sabbir (?)			Stadium: Dhaka Stadium

== 1990s ==
=== 1990 ===
September 1990 Friendly	Bangladesh	6–1	(Bangladesh) BKSP	Dhaka, Bangladesh
	Nakib (?); Aslam (?); Mamun (?); Wasim (?); Roksy (?)		Bhaktiar (?)

=== 1993 ===
6 January 1993 1993 President's Gold Cup G.S	Bangladesh Red	0–1	(Poland) Polonia Warszawa	Dhaka, Bangladesh
			Karas 62'	Stadium: Mirpur Stadium; Attendance: 25,000; Referee: Zamil Zakaria (Malaysia)

9 January 1993 1993 President's Gold Cup G.S	Bangladesh Red	1–1	Harimau Malaysia	Dhaka, Bangladesh
	Zakir 8'		Raj 37'	Stadium: Mirpur Stadium; Attendance: 12,000; Referee: Taras Bezubyak (Russia)

11 January 1993 1993 President's Gold Cup G.S	Bangladesh Red	0–2	(Russia) Krylya Sovetov	Dhaka, Bangladesh
			Fomin 44'; Ivanov 77'	Stadium: Mirpur Stadium; Attendance: 9,000; Referee: Zamil Zakaria (Malaysia)

28 October 1993 Friendly	Jessore District (Bangladesh)	1–1	Bangladesh	Jessore, Bangladesh
	Aziz 18' (pen.)		Kaiser 25' (pen.)	Stadium: Shamsul Huda Stadium; Referee: Shahidur Rahman (Bangladesh)

=== 1995 ===
30 October 1995 4-nation Tiger Trophy G.S	Singapore AFSA	0–1	Bangladesh	Yangon, Myanmar
		Report	Ranjan 10'	Stadium: Thuwunna Stadium

=== 1997 ===
August 1997 Friendly	Bangladesh	2–1	(Bangladesh) BFF President's XI	Dhaka, Bangladesh
	Amin Rana (?); Tipu (?)		Liton (?)

=== 1998 ===
29 July 1998 Friendly	Qatar U23	1–1	Bangladesh	Doha, Qatar
	Unknown 20'		Alfaz 85'	Stadium: Khalifa International Stadium

=== 1999 ===
31 August 1999 1999 Bangabandhu Cup G.S	Bangladesh	1–0	Malaysia U23	Dhaka, Bangladesh
	Dawn 29'			Stadium: Bangabandhu National Stadium

3 September 1999 1999 Bangabandhu Cup G.S	Bangladesh	2–2	(Hungary) Kerületi	Dhaka, Bangladesh
	Jewel (pen.), 85'; Masoud 88'		Sitku (?)	Stadium: Bangabandhu National Stadium

== 2000s ==
=== 2000 ===
26 July 2000 Friendly	Huddersfield Town (England)	5–0	Bangladesh	Birmingham, England

27 April 2000 Friendly	Bangladesh	6–0	Bangladesh Navy	Dhaka, Bangladesh
	Alfaz (?); Dawn (?); Munna (?); Faysal (?); Kanchan (?)	Report		Stadium: Mirpur Stadium

=== 2001 ===
16 January 2001 Millennium Super Soccer Cup	FR Yugoslavia	4–1	Bangladesh	Kochi, India
19:00 IST	Ilić 19', 38'; Rašović 80'; Trobok 89'	Report	Titu 6'	Stadium: Jawaharlal Nehru Stadium

=== 2003 ===
24 December 2002 Jigme Dorji Wangchuk Memorial Trophy G.S	George Telegraph (India)	0–2	Bangladesh	Phuentsholing, Bhutan
			Kanchan (?)

25 December 2002 Jigme Dorji Wangchuk Memorial Trophy G.S	Sikkim (India)	0–7	Bangladesh	Phuentsholing, Bhutan
			Farhad (?); Ujjal (?); Unknown (?)

27 December 2002 Jigme Dorji Wangchuk Memorial Trophy G.S	Thimphu XI (Bhutan)	0–5	Bangladesh	Phuentsholing, Bhutan
			Kanchan (?); Alfaz (?); Titu (?); Joy (?)

30 December 2002 Jigme Dorji Wangchuk Memorial Trophy S.F	Oil India	2–4	Bangladesh	Phuentsholing, Bhutan
	Unknown 3'; Unknown 44'		Sujan (?), 72' (pen.); Munna (?); Moni (?)

2 January 2003 Jigme Dorji Wangchuk Memorial Trophy Final	Thimphu XI (Bhutan)	0–1	Bangladesh	Phuentsholing, Bhutan
			Kanchan 42'

=== 2005 ===
27 October 2005 2005 Myanmar Challenge Cup G.S	China U20	1–3	(Bangladesh) BFF XI	Yangon, Bangladesh
	Unknown 16'	Report	Farhad 11', 40'; Kanchan 80'	Stadium: Thuwunna Stadium

29 October 2005 2005 Myanmar Challenge Cup G.S	Myanmar U23	2–0	(Bangladesh) BFF XI	Yangon, Bangladesh
		Report		Stadium: Thuwunna Stadium

31 October 2005 2005 Myanmar Challenge Cup G.S	India U20	0–2	(Bangladesh) BFF XI	Yangon, Bangladesh
		Report	Kanchan 10'; Farhad 82' (pen.)	Stadium: Thuwunna Stadium

2 November 2005 2005 Myanmar Challenge Cup Final	Myanmar U23	2–1 (a.e.t.)	(Bangladesh) BFF XI	Yangon, Bangladesh
	Unknown 61'; Unknown 110'	Report	Ujjal 25'	Stadium: Thuwunna Stadium

18 November 2005 Friendly	Bangladesh	2–1	(Bangladesh) Mohammedan	Dhaka, Bangladesh
	Joy 26'; Abul 85'	Report	Francis 76'	Stadium: Bangladesh Army Stadium

23 November 2005 Friendly	Bangladesh	3–2	(Bangladesh) Dhaka Abahani	Dhaka, Bangladesh
	Alfaz 65', 68'; Sujan 75'	Report	Bulbul 11' (?)	Stadium: Bangabandhu National Stadium

=== 2007 ===
4 October 2007 Friendly	Bangladesh	1–1	(Bangladesh) Dhaka XI	Dhaka, Bangladesh
	Moni 5'	Report	Das 30'	Stadium: Bangabandhu National Stadium

=== 2008 ===
24 May 2008 Friendly	Bangladesh	1–0	(Bangladesh) Sporting Independent	Dhaka, Bangladesh
	Ameli 10'	Report		Stadium: Bangabandhu National Stadium

30 May 2008 Friendly	BEC-Tero Sasana (Thailand)	0–0	Bangladesh	Bangkok, Thailand
		Report		Stadium: Boonyachinda Stadium

16 October 2008 2008 Merdeka Tournament G.S	Mozambique U-20	1–0	Bangladesh	Selangor, Malaysia
20:45 UTC+8	Jange 88'	Report		Stadium: Shah Alam Stadium; Attendance: 3,000; Referee: P. Sasidaran (India)

20 October 2008 2008 Merdeka Tournament G.S	Vietnam U-23	2–2	Bangladesh	Selangor, Malaysia
18:30 UTC+8	Văn Khải 4'; Thanh Bình 62'	Report	Ameli 32'; Zahid 49'	Stadium: Shah Alam Stadium

=== 2009 ===
21 November 2009 Friendly	Bangladesh	0–1	(Bangladesh) Sheikh Russel KC	Dhaka, Bangladesh
		Report	Hafan Al Barkah (?)	Stadium: Bangabandhu National Stadium

23 November 2009 Friendly	Bangladesh	2–0	(Bangladesh) BFF XI	Dhaka, Bangladesh
	Mithun 70'; Komol 80'	Report		Stadium: BKSP football field

25 November 2009 Friendly	Bangladesh	1–3	(South Korea) Ulsan HD FC	Dhaka, Bangladesh
	Ameli (?)	Report	Kim Sung-min (?); Lee Jin-ho (?)	Stadium: Bangabandhu National Stadium

11 December 2009 2009 SAFF Championship S.F	Bangladesh	0–1	India U23	Dhaka, Bangladesh
19:30 (BST)		Report; Report	Sushil 63'	Stadium: Bangabandhu National Stadium; Referee: Adil Ali (Maldives)

== 2010s ==
=== 2014 ===
18 December 2014 Friendly	Bangladesh	0–3	Japan U21	Dhaka, Bangladesh
		Report	Asano 60'; Minamino 73', 75'	Stadium: Bangabandhu National Stadium; Attendance: 15,000

=== 2015 ===
29 January 2015 2015 Bangabandhu Cup G.S	Bangladesh	0–1	Malaysia U23	Sylhet, Bangladesh
17:00 UTC+6		Report	Syazwan 51'	Stadium: Sylhet District Stadium; Attendance: 20,000

6 February 2015 2015 Bangabandhu Cup S.F	Bangladesh	1–0	Thailand U23	Dhaka, Bangladesh
17:00 UTC+6	Nasiruddin 38'	Report		Stadium: Bangabandhu National Stadium; Attendance: 36,000; Referee: Yu Ming-hsun (Chinese Taipei)

9 February 2015 2015 Bangabandhu Cup S.F	Bangladesh	2–3	Malaysia U23	Dhaka, Bangladesh
17:00 UTC+6	Ameli 49'; Yeasin 55'	Report	Nazirul 31'; Kumaahran 40'; Faizat 90+2'	Stadium: Bangabandhu National Stadium; Attendance: 36,000; Referee: Yu Ming-hsun (Chinese Taipei)

=== 2016 ===
13 January 2016 2015 Bangabandhu Cup G.S	Bangladesh	1–1	(Malaysia) Felda United	Dhaka, Bangladesh
18:00 UTC+6	Mithun 76'	Report	Hadin 55'	Stadium: Bangabandhu National Stadium; Attendance: 6,400; Referee: Hien Triet Nguyen (Vietnam)

18 January 2016 2015 Bangabandhu Cup G.S	Bangladesh	0–1	Bahrain U21	Dhaka, Bangladesh
17:30 UTC+6		Report	Ebrahim Alhooti 45+1'	Stadium: Bangabandhu National Stadium; Attendance: 8,000; Referee: Sivakorn Pu-Udom (Thailand)

=== 2018 ===
23 March 2018 Friendly	BG Pathum United (Thailand)	3–4	Bangladesh	Bangkok, Thailand
	Unknown (?); Unknown (?); Unknown (?)	Report	Sufil 6'; Sabuz 30', 42', 87'	Stadium: Leo Stadium

1 June 2018 Friendly	BG Pathum United (Thailand)	0–3	Bangladesh	Bangkok, Thailand
		Report	Sabuz (?); Arifur (?)	Stadium: Leo Stadium

=== 2019 ===
28 May 2019 Friendly	Air Force United (Thailand)	1–1	Bangladesh	Bangkok, Thailand
	Chuiideh 16'	Report	Biplu 4'	Stadium: Air Force Ground

1 June 2019 Friendly	BG Pathum United (Thailand)	0–3	Bangladesh	Bangkok, Thailand
		Report	Sabuz (?); Arifur (?)	Stadium: Leo Stadium

7 November 2019 Friendly	Muscat Club (Oman)	1–3	Bangladesh	Muscat, Oman
	Tareq 17' (pen.)	Report	Jibon 12'; Biplu 28'; Sabuz 65'

== 2020s ==
=== 2021 ===
23 March 2021 2021 Three Nations Cup	Kyrgyzstan U23	0–1	Bangladesh	Kathmandu, Nepal
16:45 UTC+6		Report	Kumarbay uulu 30' (o.g.)	Stadium: Dasarath Rangasala Stadium

9 September 2021 Friendly	Kyrgyzstan U23	3–2	Bangladesh	Bishkek, Kyrgyzstan
20:30 UTC+6	Zhanybek uulu 13'; Borubaev 17'; Alygulov 58'	Report	Sumon 11', 64'	Stadium: Dolen Omurzakov Stadium

=== 2023 ===
15 March 2023 Friendly	Malawi	1–1	Bangladesh	Medina, Saudi Arabia
	Msowoya 75'	Report	Bishwanath 89'	Stadium: Prince Mohammed bin Abdul Aziz Stadium; Referee: Fahad Al-Mirdasi (Saudi Arabia)

12 June 2023 Friendly	Tiffy Army (Cambodia)	0–1	Bangladesh	Phnom Penh, Cambodia
16:00 BST (UTC+6)		Report	Sohel	Stadium: TIFFY Army Stadium

=== 2024 ===
The two international friendly matches against Sudan were played behind closed doors at the King Fahd Sports City Stadium.

10 March 2024 International Friendly	Bangladesh	0–0	Sudan	Riyadh, Saudi Arabia
23:00 BST (UTC+6)		Report		Stadium: King Fahd Sports City; Referee: Fallaj Al-Shanar (Saudi Arabia)

14 March 2024 International Friendly	Bangladesh	0–3	Sudan	Riyadh, Saudi Arabia
23:00 BST (UTC+6)		Report	Agab 20'; Adel 50'; Raouf 75'	Stadium: King Fahd Sports City; Referee: Fallaj Al-Shanar (Saudi Arabia)

5 November 2024 Friendly	Bangladesh	1–0	(Bangladesh) Fortis	Dhaka, Bangladesh
18:00 UTC+6	Nova 48'			Stadium: Bashundhara Kings Arena

8 November 2024 Friendly	Bangladesh	3–2	(Bangladesh) Fortis	Dhaka, Bangladesh
18:00 UTC+6	Morsalin 17'; Nova 25'; Emon 67'		Jumaev (?); Sajib (?)	Stadium: Bashundhara Kings Arena

=== 2025 ===
18 August 2025 Friendly	Bangladesh	0–0	Bangladesh Police	Dhaka, Bangladesh
18:00 UTC+6				Stadium: National Stadium

24 August 2025 Friendly	Bangladesh	4–0	(Bangladesh) Fortis	Dhaka, Bangladesh
15:00 UTC+6	Bhuyan; Ali; Ibrahim; Reza			Stadium: National Stadium

29 August 2025 Friendly	Bangladesh	1–1	Bangladesh Police	Dhaka, Bangladesh
18:00 UTC+6	Mithu		N/A	Stadium: National Stadium

11 September 2025 Friendly	Bangladesh	0–1	(Bangladesh) Fortis	Dhaka, Bangladesh
18:00 UTC+6			Sagor	Stadium: National Stadium

=== 2026 ===
8 September 2026 Friendly	Bangladesh	2–0	(Bangladesh) City Club	Dhaka, Bangladesh
	Morsalin; Emon	Report		Stadium: Bashundhara Kings Arena

11 September 2026 Friendly	Bangladesh	0–1	(Bangladesh) Fortis	Dhaka, Bangladesh
		Report	Chukwude	Stadium: Bashundhara Kings Arena
