= Sheikh Mohammad Aslam =

Bangladeshi footballer

Mohammad Aslam
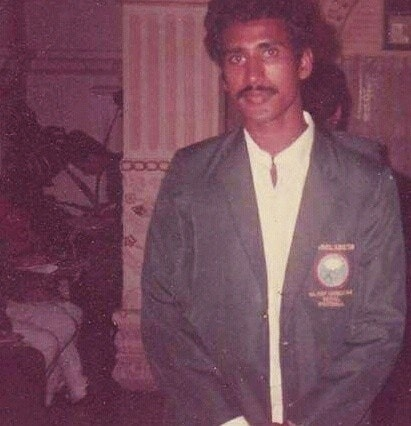
- Aslam on international duty

Personal information
- Full name: Sheikh Mohammad Aslam
- Date of birth: 1 March 1958 (age 68)
- Place of birth: Khulna, East Pakistan (present-day Bangladesh)
- Height: 1.75 m (5 ft 9 in)
- Position: Striker

Youth career
- 1974–1975: Khulna Town Club
- 1975–1977: WAPDA

Senior career*
Years	Team	Apps	(Gls)
1977–1980	Victoria		(14)
1980–1982	Team BJMC		(30)
1983	Mohammedan		(7)
1984–1991	Dhaka Abahani		(97)
1991	East Bengal		(1)
1991–1992	Dhaka Abahani		(6)
1993	Mohammedan		(7)
1994–1996	Dhaka Abahani		(16)
Total			(178)

International career
1978–1980	Bangladesh U19	12	(2)
1978–1993	Bangladesh	51	(14)
Medal record
Men's football
Representing Bangladesh
South Asian Games
Silver medal – second place	1984 Kathmandu	Team competition
Silver medal – second place	1985 Dhaka	Team competition
Bronze medal – third place	1991 Colombo	Team competition
- * Club domestic league appearances and goals

Sheikh Mohammad Aslam (Bengali: শেখ মোহাম্মদ আসলাম; born 1 March 1958), popularly known as Aslam, is a Bangladeshi retired footballer. He played as a specialist striker and was one of the most lethal marksmen in domestic league during the 1980s and 1990s. He gained fame while playing for Dhaka Abahani, one of Dhaka's two major football clubs. He was a linchpin of several league-winning Abahani sides, and was the league's leading scorer a record five times.

With 177 goals in the First Division/Premier Division League, Aslam is the all-time top scorer in Bangladeshi top-flight football. He also has 38 international goals for club and country, although many of them came during unofficial matches and are unrecorded. Aslam has 14 official international goals for the Bangladesh national team during his 15-year spell representing his country. He is said to have scored more than 300 goals in domestic and international football combined.

He later worked for the Bangladesh Football Federation after retiring.

== Club career ==
=== Early days ===
Aslam first came to Dhaka to participate in the 100m run, long jump and javelin throw events for the Team BJMC athletics team in 1976. Along with athletics he got involved with football, starting his journey in 1974 for Town Club in the Khulna Second Division Football League. The next year he played for Bangladesh WAPDA and earned promotion to the First Division Football League as the runner-up. While playing for WAPDA in 1976, he managed to attract interest from Dhaka's top tier.

In 1977, Aslam joined Victoria SC in the Dhaka First Division League. Although Aslam had started his career at the club as a defender, it was Abdur Rahim, the shrewd coach of Victoria, who saw a striker's potential in him, and changed his position in 1979. After three years at the club, he moved to Team BJMC in 1980. Aslam came into the limelight with 13 goals for BJMC in his debut year, falling two goals short of becoming the league's top scorer. He was the captain of BJMC in 1981 and spent another year at the club before making his big move to Mohammedan SC in 1983. Nonetheless, after an injury-hit season, Mohammedan officials decided to release Aslam, with Aslam scoring 7 goals during his lone season at the club. In 1984, he was snatched up by Mohammedan's arch-rivals Dhaka Abahani.

=== Years with Abahani ===
==== Domestic ====
Aslam reached the zenith of his career while playing for Dhaka Abahani, as from 1984 until 1987 he was First Division League's top goal scorer for a record four consecutive seasons. During this time, he had Kazi Salahuddin, Samrat Hossain Emily, Ratnayaka Premalal, and Karim Allawi as his striker partners at different stages. He scored 17 goals in 1984, 18 in 1985, 20 in 1986, 14 in 1987, and 17 goals in 1988. His record was later broken by Muktijoddha SKC captain Imtiaz Ahmed Nakib. In the 1989-1990 season, he scored 11 goals and set a new record of becoming the top scorer five times. From the 1984 to 1988–1989 seasons, he achieved the rare feat of scoring a hat-trick in each league for five consecutive seasons. He scored 103 goals for Abahani in seven consecutive seasons until the 1991–1992 season. Aslam won three league trophies alongside a hat-trick in the Federation Cup (from 1985 to 1988) during his first spell at the club.

One of Aslam's most notable goals came during the 1986 Federation Cup semi-finals against Mohammedan. Abahani trailed 3-4 before Aslam levelled the score by dribbling past three of Mohammedan's defenders and curling a right-footed shot into the net. Premalal scored a hat-trick in the game as Abahani won 8-5 on penalties. In 1987, during the league-deciding match against Mohammedan, Abahani needed a single point to clinch the title, and although Aslam scored, Abahani ended up losing 3–2. With Abahani and Mohammedan tied at the top with equal points, a play-off match was required. On 9 September 1987, three days after their previous encounter, the title-deciding game between Abahani-Mohammedan got underway; the high-voltage game ended 0–0. After the game ended, players and officials from both teams agreed to be crowned joint champions in order to prevent fans from attacking players. However, the Bangladesh Football Federation did not accept the players' agreement and decided to hold a second playoff match. Both captains Aslam and Mohammedan's Ranjit Saha were given a one-year ban, and without their forward Aslam, Abahani suffered a 2–0 defeat in the final play-off match, preventing Aslam from winning three consecutive league titles and Abahani their fourth in a row.

==== Continental ====
Alsam left a huge mark on continental football for Abahani, scoring a hat-trick as Abahani defeated India's Gurkha Brigade 4–1 in the DCM Trophy in New Delhi in 1984. Aslam's five goals helped Abahani beat Club Valencia from Maldives 8–1 in the 1985–86 Asian Club Championship held in Colombo. With nine goals for Abahani during the tournament, he became the highest scorer jointly with Premalal of Saunders SC of Sri Lanka.

In the three-and-a-half-decade history of India's Sait Nagjee Football Tournament, Abahani became the first foreign team to win the tournament, in 1989. In the first match, Abahani won 1–0 against Kerala club champions Travancore Titanium, Aslam scored in the 80th minute of the game, receiving Ranjit Saha's ball with his chest and beating the goalkeeper with a sharp volley. In the double league semi-final against Goa champions MRF in the 32nd minute, Kazi Kamal's free kick inside the opposition box was maneuvered by Aslam, who scored with a header. In the second match of the semi-final against MRF, "Choto" Munna scored the winning goal from Aslam's cross. In the final, Abahani took on India's Federation Cup champions, Salgaocar FC, with Aslam scoring the lone goal. He won the Man of the Tournament crown and a television set along with the trophy.

During Abahani's 1991 BTC Club Cup triumph, they managed to defeat Indian giant Kolkata Mohammedan in the group stage, with Aslam scoring one of the two goals in a 2–1 win. In the semi-final they defeated another Indian team in East Bengal Club, with goals from Aslam and Rizvi Karim Rumi. Abahani went onto defeat Dhaka Mohammedan SC in the final. Aslam was named the best player of the tournament with three goals in four matches, thus attracting interest from abroad. And as the Dhaka First Division League was not held in 1991, East Bengal Club signed Aslam along with his teammates Monem Munna and Rizvi Karim Rumi for the 1991 Calcutta Football League. After a few months in India, Aslam returned to Abahani towards the end of 1991. He was the captain of Abahani in the 1987 and 1988–1989 seasons. In 1993, he ended his first spell at the club by returning to Dhaka Mohammedan SC.

=== Calcutta League career ===
He also played for East Bengal in the Calcutta Football League in 1991, but failed to make a significant impact due to a head injury he suffered against George Telegraph SC in the 1991 Durand Cup. His first goal for the club also came during the same match during which he got injured. Aslam's stint with the club lasted a few months after he only managed one goal during the entirety of the league. Regarding his injury, Aslam said during an interview, "After scoring a goal against George Telegraph, their goalkeeper hit me so hard that I passed out. I was taken to the hospital."

=== Return to Abahani ===
After a falling out with Abahani authorities, Aslam joined Mohammedan in 1993 and scored seven goals during his year-long spell at the club. He returned to Abahani in 1994 and scored 7 goals following his return to the club. Aside from Khurshid Alam Babul, Aslam is the only player to win seven league trophies. In the mid-1990s, many star players started leaving Bangladesh's top three clubs, Mohammedan SC, Abahani and Brothers Union for Muktijoddha SKC, due to the clubs forming a gentlemen's agreement to lower the players' salaries. However, Aslam alongside Monem Munna stayed at Abahani, winning them the league title again in 1992.

In 1994, Abahani defeated Kolkata Mohammedan in the finals of India's Charms Cup, where Aslam and Munna guided a new generation of talents through the tournament. Aslam's goals did not dry out with age, as he scored 9 goals in 1995 and finished second top scorer behind Imtiaz Ahmed Nakib, who, by many at the time, was thought to be Aslam's replacement in the national team. Aslam hung up his boots in 1996, ending his illustrious league career with record 177 goals in domestic football in Dhaka, from which 119 goals were for Abahani, leaving him second in the club's all-time leading goalscorer list behind Kazi Salahuddin.

== International career ==
Aslam was part of the Bangladesh U-19 team at the 1978 AFC Youth Championship, which was the first-ever international football tournament held in Dhaka in 1978. In December 1980, Aslam played for the U-19 national team during the 1980 AFC Youth Championship qualifiers held in Dhaka. Salam Murshedy was his striker partner, while other members of the team included Lal Mohammad (GK), Alo, Azmat Ali, Sawpan Das, Imtiaz Sultan Johnny, Hassanuzzamn Bablu, Ashish Bhadra, Anwar, Gaffar, Wasim Iqbal, and Mossabbir, most of whom later went on to accompany Aslam in the senior national team. The U-19 team did well and finished runners-up (behind Qatar) and qualified for the main event. The highlight of the tournament from Bangladesh was the brace by Aslam in a 5–1 drubbing of Nepal.

He then became an essential member of the Bangladesh team in international football both at the senior and youth levels, making his senior team debut by participating in the 1978 Asian Games held in Bangkok. In 1979, he played against Sri Lanka as the youngest player on the national team during the 9th Korea Cup football held in Seoul. He scored the equalizer with a left-footed shot while trailing 0–1. This was his first goal in senior international football and on foreign soil; Bangladesh won the game 3–1. In March 1981, Aslam and the other members of the youth team participated in the first-ever edition of the President's Gold Cup, as the Bangladesh Red team (B team). The team reached the finals after beating a North Korea club in penalties (after a 1–1 draw), but lost 2–0 to South Korea XI in the final.

Aslam was one of the youngest players on the Bangladesh squad during the 1980 AFC Asian Cup in Kuwait, which was the country's first time participating in Asia's biggest football tournament after qualifying with their first attempt. In 1982, He was the vice-captain for Bangladesh during the Quaid-e-Azam Smriti tournament in Pakistan and was also part of the Bangladesh team in the 1982 Asian Games held in Delhi, India. He was an integral part of the Bangladesh Red team during the 1983 President's Gold Cup, scoring once apiece against South Korea XI and Nepal. During the 1984 AFC Asian Cup qualifiers, the newly elected national team captain Aslam struck goals against Indonesia, Philippines and Thailand, although Bangladesh failed to qualify for the main tournament.

In subcontinental tournaments, Aslam had a major partnership with Ashrafuddin Chunnu, and during the 1984 South Asian Games, Aslam's goals against Maldives and Bhutan saw favorites Bangladesh reach the finals, only to be knocked out by hosts Nepal. The subsequent year, a star-studded Bangladesh team took part in the 1985 South Asian Games on the hunt for their first international trophy. Aslam helped Bangladesh cruise through the group stage, scoring a brace during a 8–0 thrashing of Maldives. In the final against India, Aslam scored a long-range goal; nonetheless, luck was not on his side once more as Bangladesh were defeated on penalties. India's goalkeeper during the game, Atanu Bhattacharya, later told Aslam during his time at East Bengal, "Dada, you have ended my career!"

Aslam's strike in the 1986 Asian Games against Nepal gave Bangladesh their only second-ever victory in the competition. He missed the 1987 South Asian Games due to the year-long suspension he picked up in the Dhaka derby. On 27 February 1989, Aslam scored a bullet header for Bangladesh against Iran during the 1990 FIFA World Cup qualifiers. Nonetheless, Bangladesh failed to make it a memorable draw, as Rumman Wali Sabbir missed a crucial penalty towards the end of the game. During the 1989 President's Gold Cup final, Aslam scored the equalizer against Korea University as the game ended 1–1, with Bangladesh winning the title on penalties. Aslam was left out of the Bangladesh squad by Iranian coach Nasser Hejazi for the 1989 South Asian Games, a decision which was criticized by both media and fans. The 1991 South Asian Games was Aslam's final international tournament for Bangladesh, with him scoring his last international goal against Nepal.

Sheikh Aslam Important goals in his career
Match	Teams	Goals	Result
Charity Match 1979 (Dhaka)	Mohammedan Sporting Club* vs Mohammedan S.C. (Kolkata)	1	1-1
AFC Youth Championship Qualifier 1980 (Dhaka)	Bangladesh Vs Nepal	2	Bangladesh won 5–1
3rd President's Gold Cup 1983 (Dhaka)	Bangladesh (Red)** Vs South Korea XI	2	2-2
SAFF Games Final 1985 (Dhaka)	Bangladesh Vs India	1	1-1 (India won gold after a tie-breaker)
Asian Club Championship (Final) 1985–86 (Jeddah)	Abahani Vs Club Valencia (Maldives)	5	Abahani won 8–1
4th President's Gold Cup 1986 (Dhaka)	Bangladesh (Red) Vs TPS Turku (Finland)	3 (Hattrick)	Bangladesh(Red) won 3–1
IFA Shield 1986 (Calcutta)	Abahani Vs Mohammedan S.C. (Kolkata)	1	Calcutta MSC won 2–1
World Cup Qualifier 1989 (Dhaka)	Bangladesh Vs Iran	1	Iran won 2–1
6th President's Gold Cup (Final) 1989 (Dhaka)	Bangladesh (Red) Vs South Korea University	1	1-1 Bangladesh (Red) won the title after a tie breaker
Sait Nagjee Football Tournament (Final) 1989 (Kerala)	Abahani Vs Salgaocar FC (India)	1	Abahani won 1–0
BTC Club Cup (Semi-final) 1991 (Dhaka)	Abahani Vs East Bengal Club (India)	1	Abahani won 2–1

- Aslam was a Victoria SC player at the time. But since this was a charity match, Victoria authorities gave him permission to play for the Mohammedan Sporting Club.
  - In 1983, 1986 and 1989, Bangladesh (Red) represented the main national team.

== International goals ==
Key
‡ = Unofficial Fixture

List of international goals scored by Sheikh Mohammad Aslam
No.	Date	Venue	Opponent	Score	Result	Competition
1	14 September 1979	Cheongju Sports Complex, Cheongju, South Korea	Sri Lanka		3–1	1979 Korea President's Cup
–	1 September 1983	Dhaka Stadium, Dhaka, Bangladesh	South Korea XI ‡		2–2	1983 President's Gold Cup
2	4 September 1983	Dhaka Stadium, Dhaka, Bangladesh	Nepal	1–0	4–2	1983 President's Gold Cup
–	16 September 1983	Kuala Lumpur, Malaysia	(Argentina) Primera B Metropolitana XI ‡	2–3	2–5	1983 Merdeka Cup
3	9 August 1984	Senayan Stadium, Jakarta, Indonesia	Indonesia	1–2	1–2	1984 AFC Asian Cup qualification
4	13 August 1984	Sriwedari Stadium, Solo, Indonesia	Philippines	2–1	2–2	1984 AFC Asian Cup qualification
5	15 August 1984	Sriwedari Stadium, Solo, Indonesia	Thailand	1–0	1–2	1984 AFC Asian Cup qualification
6	18 September 1984	Dasharath Stadium, Kathmandu, Nepal	Bhutan	1–0	2–0	1984 South Asian Games
7	19 September 1984	Dasharath Stadium, Kathmandu, Nepal	Maldives	2–0	5–0	1984 South Asian Games
8	19 September 1984	Dasharath Stadium, Kathmandu, Nepal	Maldives	5–0	5–0	1984 South Asian Games
9	23 December 1985	Dhaka Stadium, Dhaka, Bangladesh	Maldives	2–0	8–0	1985 South Asian Games
10	23 December 1985	Dhaka Stadium, Dhaka, Bangladesh	Maldives	8–0	8–0	1985 South Asian Games
11	25 December 1985	Dhaka Stadium, Dhaka, Bangladesh	India	1–1	1(1)–1(4)	1985 South Asian Games
–	20 January 1986	Dhaka Stadium, Dhaka, Bangladesh	(Switzerland) FC Vevey United ‡		1–3	1986 President's Gold Cup
–	24 January 1986	Dhaka Stadium, Dhaka, Bangladesh	(Finland) Turun Palloseura ‡	1–1	3–1	1986 President's Gold Cup
–	24 January 1986	Dhaka Stadium, Dhaka, Bangladesh	(Finland) Turun Palloseura ‡	2–1	3–1	1986 President's Gold Cup
–	24 January 1986	Dhaka Stadium, Dhaka, Bangladesh	(Finland) Turun Palloseura ‡	3–1	3–1	1986 President's Gold Cup
12	26 September 1986	Daejeon Stadium, Daejeon, South Korea	Nepal	1–0	1–0	1986 Asian Games
13	27 February 1989	Dhaka Stadium, Dhaka, Bangladesh	Iran	1–2	1–2	1990 FIFA World Cup qualification
–	31 May 1989	Dhaka Stadium, Dhaka, Bangladesh	(South Korea) Korea University ‡	1–0	1(4)–1(3)	1989 President's Gold Cup
14	28 December 1991	Sugathadasa Stadium, Colombo, Sri Lanka	Nepal	2–0	2–0	1991 South Asian Games

== Legacy and personal life ==
Aslam's father Sheikh Ali Ahmed was also a former footballer during the East Pakistan era.

In 1986, Aslam married Mona Marjan after scoring a hat-trick against Wari Club in a league game.

Aslam was selected as the best footballer by Bangladesh Sports Writers Association in 1984 and by National Sports Council in 1998. In 1997, on the occasion of its Silver Jubilee, Bangladesh Football Federation selected the best XI of post-independence Bangladesh and in 2005, he was one of the 10 footballers honored by the football federation. In 2000, Aslam was awarded the National Sports Award.

== Style of play ==
Aslam was known for his bullet headers and movement inside the penalty box as well as his no curve extremely powerful longshots. He scored many long-range strikes for both club and country. Aslam's heading ability was due to his early days with the Team BJMC athletic team; additionally, Aslam played volleyball before pursuing football as a profession.

== Honours ==
Abahani Limited Dhaka

- Dhaka First Division/Premier Division League: 1984, 1985, 1989–90, 1991–92, 1994, 1995
- Federation Cup: 1985, 1986, 1988
- Sait Nagjee Trophy: 1989
- Independence Cup: 1990
- Azmiri Begum Gold Cup: 1990
- BTC Club Cup: 1991
- DMFA Cup: 1994
- Charms Cup: 1994

Mohammedan SC

- Dhaka Premier Division League: 1993
- Federation Cup: 1983

East Bengal Club

- Calcutta First Division League: 1991

Bangladesh

- South Asian Games Silver medal: 1984, 1985; Bronze medal: 1991

=== Awards and accolades ===
- 1984 − Sports Writers Association's Footballer of the Year
- 2000 − National Sports Award

=== Individual ===
- 1984 − Dhaka First Division League top scorer
- 1985 − Dhaka First Division League top scorer
- 1986 − Dhaka First Division League top scorer
- 1987 − Dhaka First Division League top scorer
- 1989–90 − Dhaka First Division League top scorer
- 1985–86 − Asian Club Championship top scorer
- 1980 − AFC Youth Championship Qualifying Most Valuable Player Award
