= Bangladesh national football B team =

Bangladesh B
- Nickname(s): Bangladesh Red (1981); Bangladesh Green (1982–1986; 1989–1993); Bangladesh Blue (1987)
- Association: Bangladesh Football Federation
- Confederation: AFC
- Sub-confederation: SAFF (South Asia)
- Home stadium: Dhaka Stadium, Dhaka

First international
- Bangladesh Red 1–0 Oman (Dhaka, Bangladesh; 30 March 1981)

Last international
- Bangladesh 1–2 Zimbabwe (Shah Alam, Malaysia; 25 August 2007)

The Bangladesh national football B team is a secondary football team run occasionally as support for the Bangladesh national football team.

== History ==
In 1981, the Bangladesh Football Federation started the President's Gold Cup, in which two Bangladesh national teams would participate—the national green team and the national red team. Gafur Baloch, who guided the Bangladesh U19 team at the 1980 AFC Youth Championship, was made the red team's head coach. The team mainly consisted of players who participated in the AFC Youth Championship the previous year. Baloch guided them to the final, in which they lost to South Korea XI. Since then, the B team participated in every edition of the President's Gold Cup. They were known as Bangladesh Green from 1982 to 1986 and again from 1989 to 1993. In 1987 they were called Bangladesh Blue, when the team mainly consisted of players from Abahani Krira Chakra. The blue team managed to defeat the Syria national team 1–0. In the 1989 edition, the green team, mainly consisting of youth international players, defeated the India national team 1–0.

The team last has participated in the 2007 Merdeka Cup (as Bangladesh B).

== Coach history ==
- (Bangladesh) Abdul Gafur Baloch (1981)
- (Bangladesh) Golam Sarwar Tipu (1982)
- (Bangladesh) Abdus Sadek (1983)
- (Bangladesh) Abdul Hakim (1986)
- (Bangladesh) Kazi Salahuddin (1987)
- (Bangladesh) Sazzad Hossain Siddique Lavlu (1989)
- (Bangladesh) Abdul Gaffar (1993)
- (Bangladesh) Hasanuzzaman Bablu (2007)

== Results and fixtures ==
=== 1981 ===
30 March 1981 1981 President's Gold Cup G.S	Bangladesh Red	1–0	Oman	Dhaka, Bangladesh
	Abdul Gaffar 48'	Report		Stadium: Dhaka Stadium; Referee: Kim Moon Sik (North Korea)

1 April 1981 1981 President's Gold Cup G.S	Bangladesh Red	1–0	(Thailand) Singha Club	Dhaka, Bangladesh
	Murshedy 1'	Report		Stadium: Dhaka Stadium; Referee: Sambeh Achu (Oman)

3 April 1981 1981 President's Gold Cup G.S	Bangladesh Red	1–1	(South Korea) Seoul City Hall	Dhaka, Bangladesh
	Kwon Oh-son 88' (o.g.)	Report	Park Eun Gi 48'	Stadium: Dhaka Stadium; Referee: Sambeh Achu (Oman)

7 April 1981 1981 President's Gold Cup S.F	Bangladesh Red	1–1 (a.e.t.) (5–4 p)	(North Korea) Pyongyang	Dhaka, Bangladesh
	Ashish 56'	Report	Loo Yang Bol 42'	Stadium: Dhaka Stadium; Referee: Bameshwar Rawat (Nepal)
	Penalties
	Moni (penalty scored); Sawpan (penalty scored); Azmat (penalty scored); Helal (penalty scored); Babul (penalty scored)		Joo Gan Sang (penalty scored); Kim Jong Man (penalty scored); Kim Miyang Song (penalty scored); Kim Soo Nam (penalty scored); Yang Nam (penalty missed)

9 April 1981 1981 President's Gold Cup Final	Seoul City Hall (South Korea)	2–0	Bangladesh Red	Dhaka, Bangladesh
	Joong In Choi 43'; Joong Soon Taik 70'	Report		Stadium: Dhaka Stadium; Referee: Bameshwar Rawat (Nepal)

=== 1982 ===
22 August 1982 1982 President's Gold Cup G.S	Bangladesh Green	0–0	Harimau Malaysia	Dhaka, Bangladesh
		Report		Stadium: Dhaka Stadium

24 August 1982 1982 President's Gold Cup G.S	Beijing (China)	2–0	Bangladesh Green	Dhaka, Bangladesh
	Liu Lifu 37'; Li Gongi 77'	Report		Stadium: Dhaka Stadium

27 August 1982 1982 President's Gold Cup G.S	Bangladesh Green	2–1	Pakistan	Dhaka, Bangladesh
	Badal 57'; Jahangir Hossain 59'	Report	Sarwar 39'	Stadium: Dhaka Stadium

=== 1983 ===
25 August 1983 1983 President's Gold Cup G.S	Harimau Malaysia	2–1	Bangladesh Green	Dhaka, Bangladesh
	Razip Ismail 14', 79'	Report	Abdul Gaffar	Stadium: Dhaka Stadium

28 August 1983 1983 President's Gold Cup G.S	India B	3–1	Bangladesh Green	Dhaka, Bangladesh
	Dorji; Afonso; Akum	Report	Joshi	Stadium: Dhaka Stadium

30 August 1983 1983 President's Gold Cup G.S	Bangladesh Green	1–2	(England) Middlesex Wanderers	Dhaka, Bangladesh
	Alok 34'	Report	T. Duxon 24'; M. Leslie	Stadium: Dhaka Stadium

3 September 1983 1983 President's Gold Cup G.S	Jilin (China)	2–2	Bangladesh Green	Dhaka, Bangladesh
	Cui Jing; Jin Donghao	Report	Joshi; Manik	Stadium: Dhaka Stadium

=== 1986 ===
17 January 1986 1986 President's Gold Cup G.S	Beijing (China)	2–0	Bangladesh Green	Dhaka, Bangladesh
	Gong Lei 32' (pen.); Jin Changguan 83'	Report		Stadium: Dhaka Stadium

19 January 1986 1986 President's Gold Cup G.S	Syria B	0–0	Bangladesh Green	Dhaka, Bangladesh
		Report		Stadium: Dhaka Stadium

21 January 1986 1986 President's Gold Cup G.S	Vevey-Sports (Switzerland)	1–1	Bangladesh Green	Dhaka, Bangladesh
	Patrick Gavillet	Report	Mostafizur Rahman Mostak	Stadium: Dhaka Stadium

23 January 1986 1986 President's Gold Cup G.S	Wolmido (North Korea)	0–0	Bangladesh Green	Dhaka, Bangladesh
		Report		Stadium: Dhaka Stadium

25 January 1986 1986 President's Gold Cup G.S	Turun Palloseura (Finland)	4–0	Bangladesh Green	Dhaka, Bangladesh
	Aaltonen; Suhonen; Paavola	Report		Stadium: Dhaka Stadium

27 January 1986 1986 President's Gold Cup G.S	Bangladesh Red	0–0	Bangladesh Green	Dhaka, Bangladesh
		Report		Stadium: Dhaka Stadium

=== 1987 ===
7 February 1987 1987 President's Gold Cup G.S	Bangladesh Blue	1–0	Syria	Dhaka, Bangladesh
	Kamal 67'	Report		Stadium: Dhaka Stadium

9 February 1987 1987 President's Gold Cup G.S	Bangladesh Blue	1–1	(India) Mohammedan	Dhaka, Bangladesh
	Kamal 43'	Report	Emeka 58'	Stadium: Dhaka Stadium; Referee: Younus Rana (Pakistan)

11 February 1987 1987 President's Gold Cup G.S	Guangdong (China)	3–0	Bangladesh Blue	Dhaka, Bangladesh
	Wu Qunli 63', 79'; Chen Haixian 64'	Report		Stadium: Dhaka Stadium

=== 1989 ===
22 May 1989 1989 President's Gold Cup G.S	Bangladesh Green	1–1	(South Korea) Korea University	Dhaka, Bangladesh
	Ayaz Ahmed	Report	Song Ju-seok	Stadium: Mirpur Stadium

24 May 1989 1989 President's Gold Cup G.S	Bangladesh Green	1–0	India	Dhaka, Bangladesh
	Iqbalur Rahman Iqbal 76'	Report		Stadium: Mirpur Stadium

27 May 1989 1989 President's Gold Cup G.S	Bangladesh Green	1–0	(China) Liaoning	Dhaka, Bangladesh
	Li Ko Yang 73' (o.g.)	Report		Stadium: Mirpur Stadium

28 May 1989 1989 President's Gold Cup G.S	Bangladesh Green	0–1	Bangladesh Red	Dhaka, Bangladesh
		Report	Sabbir	Stadium: Mirpur Stadium

=== 1993 ===
8 January 1993 1993 President's Gold Cup G.S	Tatran Prešov (Slovakia)	1–0	Bangladesh Green	Dhaka, Bangladesh
	Jozef Danko 43'	Report		Stadium: Mirpur Stadium; Attendance: 21,000; Referee: Choi Chan Goun (South Korea)

10 January 1993 1993 President's Gold Cup G.S	Housing Bank (South Korea)	1–0	Bangladesh Green	Dhaka, Bangladesh
	Choi Tae Ho 41'	Report		Stadium: Mirpur Stadium; Attendance: 13,200; Referee: Ryszard Wójcik (Poland)

12 January 1993 1993 President's Gold Cup G.S	Petrolul Ploiești (Romania)	4–2	Bangladesh Green	Dhaka, Bangladesh
	Florin Simion 13'; Stefan Matel 68'; Ciprian Pura 74'; Marian Grama 77'	Report	Nakib 76'; Arman 82'	Stadium: Mirpur Stadium; Attendance: 8,200; Referee: Ryszard Wójcik (Poland)

=== 2007 ===
21 August 2007 2007 Merdeka Tournament G.S	Indonesia U-23	1–0	Bangladesh B	Shah Alam, Malaysia
20:30	Cornelius Map 27'			Stadium: Shah Alam Stadium

23 August 2007 2007 Merdeka Tournament G.S	Singapore U-23	2–1	Bangladesh B	Shah Alam, Malaysia
18:30 (SST)	Ridhuan Muhammad 43'; Fazrul Nawaz 45'		Zumratul Hossain Mithu 89'	Stadium: Shah Alam Stadium

25 August 2007 2007 Merdeka Tournament G.S	Bangladesh B	1–2	Zimbabwe	Shah Alam, Malaysia
20:30	Saifur Rahman Moni 88'		Lionel Mtizwa 38'; Johannes Ngodzo 58'	Stadium: Shah Alam Stadium

== Competitive record ==
=== Bangladesh President's Gold Cup ===
Bangladesh President's Gold Cup record
Year	Result	Position	GP	W	D	L	GF	GA	Name
1981	Runners-up	2nd	5	2	2	1	4	4	Bangladesh Red
1982	Group-stage	5th	3	1	1	1	2	2	Bangladesh Green
1983	Group-stage	9th	4	0	1	3	5	10	Bangladesh Green
1986	Group-stage	7th	6	0	4	2	1	7	Bangladesh Green
1987	Group-stage	4th	3	1	1	1	2	4	Bangladesh Blue
1989	Semi-final	3rd	4	2	1	1	3	1	Bangladesh Green
1993	Group-stage	8th	3	3	0	0	1	4	Bangladesh Green

- Source = RSSSF

=== Other tournaments ===
Invitational tournament record
Year	Result	Position	GP	W	D	L	GF	GA	Name
2007 Merdeka	Group-stage	7th	3	0	1	2	2	4	Bangladesh B

== Honours ==
- President's Gold Cup runners-up: 1981

== See also ==
- Football in Bangladesh
  - Bangladesh Football Federation
  - Bangladesh National Team
  - Bangladesh Women's Team
- Youth Teams
  - Bangladesh U-23 Team
  - Bangladesh U20 Team
  - Bangladesh U17 Team
