= Abdus Sadek =

Bangladeshi footballer and coach (1945–2011)

- Sadek in 2011

Personal information
- Full name: Mohamed Abdus Sadek
- Date of birth: 31 July 1945
- Place of birth: Parbatipur, Dinajpur, Bengal Presidency, British India (present-day Bangladesh)
- Date of death: 13 July 2011 (aged 65)
- Place of death: Dhaka, Bangladesh
- Positions: Right winger; right midfielder

Senior career*
Years	Team	Apps	(Gls)
1962–1963	Fire Service		

Managerial career
- 1983: Dhaka Metropolis U18
- 1983: Bangladesh B
- 1988: Bangladesh U19 (assistant)
- 1989: Bangladesh
- 1994: Bangladesh U16
- 1995: Bangladesh (assistant)
- * Club domestic league appearances and goals

Abdus Sadek (Bengali: আবদুস সাদেক; 31 July 1945 – 13 July 2011) was a former Bangladeshi football player and coach.

== Playing career ==
Sadek represented Fire Service AC in the Dhaka First Division Football League. In 1963, he represented East Pakistan Combined University team at the National Football Championship in Karachi.

== Coaching career ==
In 1983, Sadek served as coach of the Bangladesh Green team at the 1983 President's Gold Cup in Dhaka. He went on to work as the chief football coach of National Sports Council from 1985 to 1990.

In 1989, Sadek was appointed head coach of the Bangladesh national team (Bangladesh Red team) for the 1989 President's Gold Cup. The team secured draws against Thailand B and Iran B to advance to the semi-finals, where they defeated Bangladesh B (Bangladesh B team) with a goal from Rumman Bin Wali Sabbir. In the final, held on May 28, 1989, the team played to a 1–1 draw with Korea University in normal time and ultimately triumphed in a penalty shootout, winning 4–3. This marked Bangladesh's first international title, although the tournament is not highly regarded due to the majority of participating teams being international selections. Nonetheless, the Korean team featured notable players such as Seo Jung-won, Huh Ki-tae, Hong Myung-bo, and Kim Byung-soo, among others.

Sadek also served as the head coach of the Bangladesh U16 team at the 1994 AFC U-16 Championship qualifiers held in Saudi Arabia. In 1995, he served as the assistant coach of the team which on the 4-nation Tiger Trophy in Myanmar under coach Otto Pfister, a tournament largely considered to be the country's first international trophy.

== Death ==
On 13 June 2011, Sadek died of kidney failure while under treatment at the Islami Hospital in Dhaka.

== Honours ==
Bangladesh Red

- Bangladesh President's Gold Cup: 1989

== See also ==
- List of Bangladesh national football team managers

== Bibliography ==
- Mahmud, Dulal (2020). খেলার মাঠে মুক্তিযুদ্ধ (transl. Liberation war in the playground) (in Bengali). Bishhoshahitto Bhobon. ISBN 978-984-8218-31-0.
- Alam, Masud (2017). ফুটবলের গল্প ফুটবলারদের গল্প (transl. The story of football the story of footballers) (in Bengali). Bishhoshahitto Bhobon. ISBN 9789849134688.
