= Lal Mohammad =

Bangladeshi footballer (c. 1956–2016)

Saiful Ansari
- Lal with the Bangladesh Red team in 1981

Personal information
- Full name: Mohammad Saiful Ansari
- Date of birth: c. 1956
- Place of birth: Dhaka, East Pakistan (present-day Bangladesh)
- Date of death: 20 June 2016 (aged 60)
- Place of death: Dhaka, Bangladesh
- Height: 1.83 m (6 ft 0 in)
- Position: Goalkeeper

Senior career*
Years	Team	Apps	(Gls)
1972–1974	Purbachal Parishad		
1975	Shantinagar Club		
1976–1977	Police AC		
1978	Team BJMC		
1979–1980	Police AC		
1981	Victoria SC		
1982	Mohammedan SC		

International career
1980–1981	Bangladesh U19	6	(0)
1982	Bangladesh	3	(0)
- * Club domestic league appearances and goals

Saiful Ansari (Bengali: সাইফুল আনসারী; c. 1956 – 20 June 2016), known by his nickname Lal Mohammad, was a Bangladeshi football player who played as a goalkeeper.

== Playing career ==
Lal Mohammad began his career in the Dhaka Third Division League with Purbachal Parishad in 1972. He made his debut in the First Division with Police AC in 1976.

Although initially selected as a second-choice goalkeeper, to Moinul Karim, Lal made two appearances during the 1980 AFC Youth Championship qualifiers held in Dhaka, and later played all four games in the main event held in Bangkok.

He later represented the runners-up Bangladesh Red team in the 1981 President's Gold Cup. The following year, he appeared for the Bangladesh national team for three games during Pakistan's Quaid-e-Azam International Tournament.

In 1982, he stepped away from football after his club, Mohammedan SC, suffered a 0–2 defeat to Victoria SC in the league. His teammates, however, admitted that the goalkeeper was not at fault for the goals conceded.

Lal Mohammed left the club after a 0–2 loss to Victoria. Not only the club, but in a sense gave up football!

— Former Mohammedan SC captain Badal Roy on Lal Mohammad's retirement.

== Death ==
On 20 June 2016, Lal Mohammad died of cardiac arrest at his residence in Malibagh, Dhaka.

== Honours ==
Shantinagar Club

- Dhaka Second Division League: 1975

Mohammedan SC

- Dhaka First Division League: 1982
- Federation Cup: 1982
