= Mazidul Islam Moni =

Bangladeshi footballer

Mazidul Islam
Personal information
- Full name: Mazidul Islam Moni
- Date of birth: 1955 (age 70–71)
- Place of birth: Pabna, East Pakistan (present-day Bangladesh)
- Position: Center-back

Senior career*
Years	Team	Apps	(Gls)
1976–1977	Azad SC		
1978–1980	Brothers Union		
1981–1983	Dhaka Abahani		
1984	Mohammedan SC		
1985	Rahmatganj MFS		
1984–1991	Customs SC		

International career
1980	Bangladesh U19		
1982–1984	Bangladesh		
- * Club domestic league appearances and goals

Mazidul Islam Moni (Bengali: মজিদুল ইসলাম মনি) is a retired Bangladeshi footballer who represented the Bangladesh national team from 1982 to 1984. He was also part of the Mukti Bahini during the Bangladesh Liberation War.

== Early life ==
Born in Pabna, East Pakistan, Moni completed his secondary education at Pabna District School and pursued his higher secondary studies at Shahid Bulbul Government College in Pabna. He later earned both a bachelor's and a master's degree from Dhaka University. Moni played both football and hockey at the inter-school and district levels. Additionally, he secured first place in the 100m and 200m sprints at inter-district competitions. He began playing in the Pabna First Division Football League from 1974.

== Club career ==
In 1975, Moni trained under Sandy, the Scottish coach of WAPDA Sports Club; however, he did not register with the Dhaka-based club. The following year, he made his Dhaka First Division Football League debut with Azad Sporting Club, playing as a midfielder. In 1978, he joined Brothers Union, where he spent two seasons, playing as a central defender. Moni also represented Dhaka University at the Sher-e-Bangla Cup and won the championship twice.

He joined Abahani Krira Chakra in 1981, and won the league title in his debut season and again in 1983. He also won the Federation Cup title with the Sky Blues in 1982. At Abahani, Moni formed a formidable partnership with Sri Lankan center-back, Ashoka Rabindra. He was also arrested alongside eleven Abahani players following an incident during the Dhaka derby in September 1982. However, his punishment was lenient, and he was released soon after.

In 1984, Moni joined Mohammedan SC while simultaneously taking up a job at the Chittagong Customs. Due to his job in Chittagong, Moni spent only one year with Mohammedan and the following year, played a few games for Rahmatganj MFS, before ending his career in Dhaka. He continued to play in the Chittagong First Division Football League with Customs Sports Club until 1991.

== International career ==
Moni represented the Bangladesh U19 team at the 1980 AFC Youth Championship and was also part of the team's qualification campaign. In 1981, under head coach Abdul Gafur Baloch, he represented Bangladesh Red (B national team) at the President's Gold Cup held in Dhaka.

In 1982, Gafur Baloch, serving as the head coach of the Bangladesh national team, included Moni in the squad for the 1982 Quaid-e-Azam International Tournament held in Karachi, Pakistan. On 16 February 1982, he debuted for the senior national team in a 1–1 draw against Nepal at the Karachi National Stadium. He made a total of four appearances in what was a disappointing tournament for Bangladesh. Nevertheless, Moni remained in the team for both the 1982 President's Gold Cup and 1982 Asian Games. Moni also appeared for the Red team (main national team) at the 1983 President's Gold Cup. His final appearances for the national team came during the 1984 AFC Asian Cup qualifiers held in Indonesia.

== Bangladesh Liberation War ==
Moni traveled to India in April 1971 with the intention of joining the Bangladesh Liberation War but returned after failing to find a training camp. Undeterred, he crossed the Kushtia border on foot in May and succeeded in reaching the Kachuadanga camp in Nadia district, where he received armed training as the youngest freedom fighter. At the time, he was a 16-year-old 10th-grade student at Pabna District School. Returning home in June, Moni fought in Sector 7 and participated in key operations. He was in Pabna city on 16 December 1971, the day of Bangladesh's victory.

== Honours ==
Abahani Krira Chakra

- Dhaka First Division League: 1981, 1983
- Federation Cup: 1982

Mohammedan SC

- DMFA Cup: 1984

== Bibliography ==
- Dulal, Mahmud (2020). খেলার মাঠে মুক্তিযুদ্ধ (transl. Liberation war in the playground) (in Bengali). Bishhoshahitto Bhobon. ISBN 978-984-8218-31-0.
- Alam, Masud (2017). ফুটবলের গল্প ফুটবলারদের গল্প (transl. The story of football the story of footballers) (in Bengali). Bishhoshahitto Bhobon. ISBN 9789849134688.
