= Sawpan Kumar Das =

Bangladeshi footballer

Sawpan Das
Personal information
- Full name: Sawpan Kumar Das
- Date of birth: 10 November 1958 (age 67)
- Place of birth: Munshiganj, East Pakistan (present-day Bangladesh)
- Positions: Left back; left winger

Team information
- Current team: Fakirerpool (head coach)

Senior career*
Years	Team	Apps	(Gls)
1976–1977	Bangladesh Police		
1977–1979	Wari Club		
1979–1980	Dhaka Wanderers		
1980–1986	Mohammedan		
1986–1988	Brothers Union		
1988–1990	Mohammedan		

International career
1978–1980	Bangladesh U19		
1978–1985	Bangladesh		

Managerial career
- 1993: PWD
- 1994: Bangladesh U16 (assistant)
- 2007: Chittagong Abahani
- 2025–: Fakirerpool
- * Club domestic league appearances and goals

Sawpan Kumar Das (Bengali: স্বপন কুমার দাস; born 11 November 1958) is a retired Bangladeshi football player who is currently the head coach of Bangladesh Football League club Fakirerpool YMC. He captained the Bangladesh national football team once during his international career.

== Club career ==
Sawpan started playing for Bangladesh Police in the 1976 Dhaka First Division League. He then went on to play for Wari Club and Wanderers Club before joining Mohammedan SC in 1980. The high point of his career at Wari came in 1978 when he was a part of the club's famous league double (2–0 & 3–2) over the reigning champions Abahani Krira Chakra. The following year, they defeated Mohammedan SC 2–0 and were dubbed the "Giant Killers" of domestic football.

In 1984, Sawpan captained Mohammedan, and eventually switched clubs a couple of years later by joining Brothers Union. In his debut season with the Oranges, they finished third in the league. Sawpan retired in 1990 after returning to Mohammedan and finished his career by winning his third and final First Division title.

== International career ==
In 1978, Sawpan got selected for the Bangladesh U20 team by German coach Werner Bickelhaupt, for the 1978 AFC Youth Championship held in Dhaka. His performance during the tournament convinced Bickelhaupt to give him a place in the senior national team squad, for the 1978 Asian Games.

Sawpan went on to represent his country during the 1979 President's Cup in Korea, and the 1980 AFC Asian Cup qualifiers, in Dhaka. However, coach Abdur Rahim did not include him in the squad for the 1980 AFC Asian Cup. In 1981, Sawpan was part of the Under–20 team that took part in the 1980 AFC Youth Championship. During the tournament he was an integral part of the team, helping Bangladesh earn draws against both South Korea and Qatar. Nonetheless, the team disappointed during the other two games, and were unable to advance past the group-stage.

In 1982, Sawpan returned to the senior team under coach Gafur Baloch, he was a member of a disappointing Bangladesh team which took part in the Quaid-e-Azam International Tournament in Pakistan. Nonetheless, during the 1982 Asian Games, Swapan was part of the team which made history by defeating Malaysia 2–1.

He was made the captain of the Bangladesh Green team (B team) at the 1983 President's Gold Cup in Dhaka. He represented Bangladesh in the Bangladesh President's Gold Cup in 1981, 1982 and 1983. In 1983, Sawpan played his first Merdeka Cup. During his last two years representing Bangladesh, Sawpan played in the 1984 AFC Asian Cup qualifiers and 1986 FIFA World Cup qualifiers. His last international tournament was the 1985 edition of Pakistan's Quaid-e-Azam Tournament, during which he captained the team; however, he did not enter the field even once due to an injury.

== Coaching career ==
Sawpan joined the football coaching panel of the National Sports Council in 1995 and remained at his post until retiring in May 2015. He also served as a coach for different clubs in the Chittagong Football League. Additionally, he was the assistant coach of the Bangladesh U16 team during the 1994 AFC U-16 Championship qualifiers. In 2007, he was appointed head coach of Chittagong Abahani for the inaugural season of the Bangladesh Premier League.

== Honours ==
Mohammedan SC

- Dhaka First Division League: 1980, 1982, 1988–89
- Federation Cup: 1980, 1981, 1982, 1983, 1989
- DMFA Cup: 1984
- Ashis-Jabbar Shield Tournament (India): 1982
