= Mohamed Abdul Hakim =

Bangladeshi footballer

Abdul Hakim
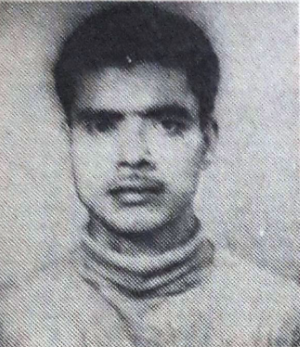
- Abdul Hakim, 1970

Personal information
- Full name: Mohamed Abdul Hakim
- Date of birth: 3 February 1945
- Place of birth: Rajshahi, Bengal, British India (present-day Bangladesh)
- Date of death: 17 September 2015 (aged 70)
- Place of death: Jamalpur, Bangladesh
- Position: Goalkeeper

Senior career*
Years	Team	Apps	(Gls)
1960	Kamal SC		
1961–1966	Dhaka Wanderers		
1967–1971	EPIDC		

International career
1969	East Pakistan		

Managerial career
- 1986: Bangladesh B
- 1986: Bangladesh
- 1986: Arambagh KS
- 1987: Dhaka Wanderers
- 1993: Bangladesh U23
- * Club domestic league appearances and goals

Mohamed Abdul Hakim (Bengali: মোহাম্মদ আব্দুল হাকিম; 3 February 1945 – 17 September 2015) was a Bangladeshi football player and coach.

== Early life ==
Mohamed Abdul Hakim was born on 3 February 1945 in Rajshahi, British India.

== Club career ==
In 1959, he took part in national football training, which opened the pathway to Dhaka football for him. The following year, Hakim began playing in the First Division with Kamal Sporting Club. In 1961, he joined Dhaka Wanderers Club, and went on to serve them for the following six years. In 1967, he joined EPIDC, and in the same year the club won both the First Division and All-Pakistan Ismail Gold Shield, with Hakim receiving Pakistan's Best Goalkeeper Award.

== International career ==
On 31 October 1967, Hakim represented the PFF XI, a youth team consisting of mainly East Pakistani players, in a 2–5 defeat against the touring American club Dallas Tornado at the Dhaka Stadium. In September 1969, Hakim was selected for the East Pakistan squad for the Tribhuvan Challenge Shield in Kathmandu, Nepal, but East Pakistan eventually withdrew from the tournament before it began.

== Coaching career ==
In 1969, Hakim underwent training under German coach Dettmar Cramer, who had been sent to Pakistan on a coaching assignment by the Asian Football Confederation. Following the Independence of Bangladesh, Hakim participated in training courses conducted in the country by FIFA coaches.

In 1980, he joined the National Sports Council. In January 1986, Hakim took charge of the Bangladesh Green team, a national B team, at the 1986 President's Gold Cup in Dhaka. In March 1986, he was appointed head coach of the Bangladesh national team for the 1986 Pakistan President's Gold Cup held in Karachi. The team mainly consisting of players from the Green team, finished third in the tournament, notably defeating the Pakistan national team 1–0. He coached Dhaka Wanderers to a runners-up finish in the 1987 Federation Cup, with the latter. He was also appointed coach of the first Bangladesh U23 team, which participated in the 1992 Summer Olympics Qualifiers.

== Honours ==
=== Player ===
Dhaka Wanderers

- Independence Day Football Tournament: 1963, 1966

EPIDC

- Dhaka First Division League: 1967, 1968, 1970
- All-Pakistan Ismail Gold Shield: 1967, 1968, 1969
- Independence Day Football Tournament: 1967, 1968, 1969

=== Manager ===
Dhaka Wanderers

- Federation Cup runners-up: 1987

== See also ==
- List of Bangladesh national football team managers
