= 1993 Bangladesh President's Gold Cup =

Tournament details
- Host country: Bangladesh
- Dates: 6–16 January 1993
- Teams: 8 (from 2 confederations)
- Venue(s): Mirpur Stadium

Final positions
- Champions: (Romania) Petrolul Ploiești (1st title)
- Runners-up: (Poland) Polonia Warsaw
- Third place: (Russia) Krylya Sovetov

Tournament statistics
- Matches played: 16
- Goals scored: 42 (2.63 per match)
- Top scorer(s): (South Korea) Choi Tae Ho (Romania) Florin Simion (Russia) Vladimir Filippov (3 goals)

The 1993 Bangladesh President's Gold Cup was the seventh and final edition of the Bangladesh President's Gold Cup. The event was held at the Mirpur Stadium in Dhaka, Bangladesh.

== Venues ==
Dhaka	1993 Bangladesh President's Gold Cup is located in Bangladesh
Mirpur Stadium	1993 Bangladesh President's Gold Cup is located in Bangladesh
Capacity: 25,000	1993 Bangladesh President's Gold Cup is located in Bangladesh

== Group stage ==
=== Group A ===
Pos	Team	Pld	W	D	L	GF	GA	GD	Pts	Qualification
1	(Poland) Polonia Warszawa	3	2	1	0	8	2	+6	5	Advance to the semi-finals
2	(Russia) Krylya Sovetov	3	2	1	0	5	2	+3	5	Advance to the semi-finals
3	Bangladesh Red	3	0	1	2	1	4	−3	1	
4	Harimau Malaysia	3	0	1	2	3	9	−6	1	

Source: RSSSF

6 January 1993

Polonia Warszawa (Poland)	1–0	Bangladesh Red
Jan Karas 62'	Report

Mirpur Stadium, Dhaka
Attendance: 25,000
Referee: Zamil Zakaria (Malaysia)

7 January 1993

Krylya Sovetov (Russia)	2–1	Harimau Malaysia
Evgeni Harlatchev 40'; Filippov 69'	Report	Sanbagamaran 51'

Mirpur Stadium, Dhaka
Attendance: 7,000
Referee: R.Alam (Bangladesh)

9 January 1993

Krylya Sovetov (Russia)	1–1	(Poland) Polonia Warszawa
Fakhrutdinov 34'	Report	Pawel Kowalewski 67'

Mirpur Stadium, Dhaka
Attendance: 7,600
Referee: S.K. Badruddin (Bangladesh)

9 January 1993

Bangladesh Red	1–1	Harimau Malaysia
Zakir 8'	Report	Paul Raj 37'

Mirpur Stadium, Dhaka
Attendance: 12,000
Referee: Taras Bezubyak (Russia)

11 January 1993

Polonia Warszawa (Poland)	6–1	Harimau Malaysia
Paweł Kowalewski 10'; Rosicki 18'; Dznigaza 47'; Zbigniew Tietz 47'; Krzeminski 77' (pen.); Dziceol ?' (pen.)	Report	Aziz ?'

Mirpur Stadium, Dhaka
Attendance: 1,800
Referee: Rafiqul Islam (Bangladesh)

11 January 1993

Krylya Sovetov (Russia)	2–0	Bangladesh Red
Fomin 44'; Ivanov 77'	Report

Mirpur Stadium, Dhaka
Attendance: 9,000
Referee: Zamil Zakaria (Malaysia)

=== Group B ===
Pos	Team	Pld	W	D	L	GF	GA	GD	Pts	Qualification
1	(Romania) Petrolul Ploiești	3	2	1	0	7	3	+4	5	Advance to the semi-finals
2	(South Korea) Housing Bank	3	2	0	1	5	3	+2	4	Advance to the semi-finals
3	(Slovakia) Tatran Prešov	3	1	1	1	3	5	−2	3	
4	Bangladesh Green	3	0	0	3	2	6	−4	0	

Source: RSSSF
8 January 1993

Petrolul Ploiești (Romania)	2–0	(South Korea) Housing Bank
Stefan Matei 26'; Ciprian Pura 69'	Report

Mirpur Stadium, Dhaka
Attendance: 13,600
Referee: Nazir Hossain (Bangladesh)

8 January 1993

Tatran Prešov (Slovakia)	1–0	Bangladesh Green
Jozef Danko 43'	Report

Mirpur Stadium, Dhaka
Attendance: 21,000
Referee: Choi Chan Goun (South Korea)

10 January 1993

Petrolul Ploiești (Romania)	1–1	(Slovakia) Tatran Prešov
Florin Simion 53'	Report	Viduminsky Vilam 71' (pen.)

Mirpur Stadium, Dhaka
Attendance: 31,000
Referee: A.H. Chowdhury (Bangladesh)

10 January 1993

Housing Bank (South Korea)	1–0	Bangladesh Green
Choi Tae Ho 41'	Report

Mirpur Stadium, Dhaka
Attendance: 13,200
Referee: Ryszard Wójcik (Poland)

12 January 1993

Housing Bank (South Korea)	4–1	(Slovakia) Tatran Prešov
Choi Tae Ho 39', 56'; Shin Ho Chul 43'; Kim Jin Tae 81'	Report	Viliam Vidumsky 69' (pen.)

Mirpur Stadium, Dhaka
Attendance: 11,000
Referee: R.Alam (Bangladesh)

12 January 1993

Petrolul Ploiești (Romania)	4–2	Bangladesh Green
Florin Simion 13'; Stefan Matel 68'; Ciprian Pura 74'; Marian Grama 77'	Report	Nakib 76'; Arman 82'

Mirpur Stadium, Dhaka
Attendance: 8,200
Referee: Ryszard Wójcik (Poland)

== Knockout stage ==
=== Semi-finals ===
13 January 1993

Polonia Warszawa (Poland)	2–0	(South Korea) Housing Bank
Sawa 49'; Bogdan Tereszerynslu 69'	Report

Mirpur Stadium, Dhaka
Attendance: 3,400
Referee: Zamil Zakaria (Malaysia)

14 January 1993

Petrolul Ploiești (Romania)	1–0 (a.e.t.)	(Russia) Krylya Sovetov
Valentin Negoiţă 117'	Report

Mirpur Stadium, Dhaka
Attendance: 2,600
Referee: Choi Chang Seon (South Korea)

=== Third-place ===
16 January 1993

Krylya Sovetov (Russia)	1–0	(South Korea) Housing Bank
Filippov 2', 19'; Fomin ?'	Report	Lee Oh Kyun 47'

Mirpur Stadium, Dhaka
Attendance: 1,200
Referee: Nazir Hossain (Bangladesh)

=== Final ===
16 January 1993

Petrolul Ploiești (Romania)	1–0	(Poland) Polonia Warszawa
Florin Simion 27'	Report

Mirpur Stadium, Dhaka
Attendance: 12,300
Referee: Choi Chang Seon (South Korea)
