= 1981 Bangladesh President's Gold Cup =

Tournament details
- Host country: Bangladesh
- Dates: 29 March–9 April 1981
- Teams: 8 (from 1 confederation)
- Venue: Dhaka Stadium

Final positions
- Champions: (South Korea) Seoul City Hall (1st title)
- Runners-up: Bangladesh Red

Tournament statistics
- Matches played: 15
- Goals scored: 43 (2.87 per match)
- Top scorer: (South Korea) Park Young Gi (6 goals)

The 1981 Bangladesh President's Gold Cup was the inaugural edition of the Bangladesh President's Gold Cup. The event was held at the Dhaka Stadium in Dhaka, Bangladesh.

== Venues ==
Dhaka	1981 Bangladesh President's Gold Cup is located in Bangladesh
Dhaka Stadium	1981 Bangladesh President's Gold Cup is located in Bangladesh
Capacity: 36,000	1981 Bangladesh President's Gold Cup is located in Bangladesh

== Group stage ==
=== Group A ===
Pos	Team	Pld	W	D	L	GF	GA	GD	Pts	Qualification
1	(South Korea) Seoul City Hall	3	2	1	0	4	1	+3	5	Advance to the semi-finals
2	Bangladesh Red	3	2	1	0	3	1	+2	5	Advance to the semi-finals
3	Oman	3	1	0	2	3	4	−1	2	
4	(Thailand) Singha Club	3	0	0	3	1	5	−4	0	

Source: RSSSF
29 March 1981

Seoul City Hall (South Korea)	1–0	(Thailand) Singha Club
Bang Eun Choi 42'	Report

Dhaka Stadium, Dhaka
Referee: Munir Hossain (Bangladesh)

30 March 1981

Bangladesh Red	1–0	Oman
Abdul Gaffar 48'	Report

Dhaka Stadium, Dhaka
Referee: Kim Moon Sik (North Korea)

1 April 1981

Seoul City Hall (South Korea)	2–0	Oman
Park Eun Gi 40', 62'	Report

Dhaka Stadium, Dhaka
Referee: Moiuddeen Chowdhury (Bangladesh)
1 April 1981

Bangladesh Red	1–0	(Thailand) Singha Club
Murshedy 1'	Report

Dhaka Stadium, Dhaka
Referee: Sambeh Achu (Oman)

3 April 1981

Oman	3–1	(Thailand) Singha Club
Mubarak Taqi 14'; Abdullah Hamood 72', 83' (pen.)	Report	Sutep 51'

Dhaka Stadium, Dhaka
Referee: Abdur Rashid (Bangladesh)
3 April 1981

Bangladesh Red	1–1	(South Korea) Seoul City Hall
Kwon Oh-son 88' (o.g.)	Report	Park Eun Gi 48'

Dhaka Stadium, Dhaka
Referee: Sambeh Achu (Oman)

=== Group B ===
Pos	Team	Pld	W	D	L	GF	GA	GD	Pts	Qualification
1	(North Korea) Pyongyang SC	3	1	2	0	5	2	+3	4	Advance to the semi-finals
2	Bangladesh Green	3	1	2	0	5	3	+2	4	Advance to the semi-finals
3	(Iraq) Combined Baghdad XI	3	1	1	1	10	4	+6	3	
4	Nepal	3	0	1	2	1	12	−11	1	

Source: RSSSF
31 March 1981

Pyongyang SC (North Korea)	1–1	(Iraq) Combined Baghdad XI
Joo Gan Sang 38'	Report	Benyamen Dhenka 74'

Dhaka Stadium, Dhaka
Referee: Dalil Khan (Bangladesh)
31 March 1981

Bangladesh Green	1–1	Nepal
Salahuddin 34'	Report	Krishna 26'

Dhaka Stadium, Dhaka
Referee: Kim Soo Duk (South Korea)

2 April 1981

Pyongyang SC (North Korea)	3–0	Nepal
Lee Song Hoo 63', 65'; Sin Hak Euk 89'	Report

Dhaka Stadium, Dhaka
Referee: Zahurul Haque (Bangladesh)
2 April 1981

Bangladesh Green	3–1	(Iraq) Combined Baghdad XI
Chunnu 33'; Salahuddin 53', 88'	Report	Asam Abdul Razzak 69'

Dhaka Stadium, Dhaka
Referee: Sambeh Achu (Oman)

4 April 1981

Combined Baghdad XI (Iraq)	8–0	Nepal
Ali Hossain 9', 30'; Wadim Munnir 14', 44'; Asam Abdul Razzak 19'; Ganem Arabi 20', 37'; Benyamen Dhenka 25'	Report

Dhaka Stadium, Dhaka
Referee: Munir Hossain (Bangladesh)
4 April 1981

Bangladesh Green	1–1	(North Korea) Pyongyang SC
Tutul 76'	Report	Kim Jong Man 25'

Dhaka Stadium, Dhaka
Referee: Bameshwar Rawat (Nepal)

== Knockout stage ==
=== Semi-finals ===
6 April 1981

Seoul City Hall (South Korea)	5–2	Bangladesh Green
Kwon Oh-son 4'; Park Eun Gi 23', 85', 90'; Son Jong Sook 67'	Report	Salahuddin 73', 79'

Dhaka Stadium, Dhaka
Referee: Bameshwar Rawat (Nepal)

7 April 1981

Bangladesh Red	1–1 (a.e.t.)	(North Korea) Pyongyang SC
Ashish 56'	Report	Loo Yang Bol 42'
Penalties
Moni (penalty scored); Sawpan (penalty scored); Azmat (penalty scored); Helal (penalty scored); Babul (penalty scored)	5–4	Joo Gan Sang (penalty scored); Kim Jong Man (penalty scored); Kim Miyang Song (penalty scored); Kim Soo Nam (penalty scored); Yang Nam (penalty missed)

Dhaka Stadium, Dhaka
Referee: Bameshwar Rawat (Nepal)

=== Final ===
9 April 1981

Seoul City Hall (South Korea)	2–0	Bangladesh Red
Joong In Choi 43'; Joong Soon Taik 70'	Report

Dhaka Stadium, Dhaka
Referee: Bameshwar Rawat (Nepal)

== Statistics ==
=== Goalscorers ===
There were 43 goals scored in 15 matches, for an average of 2.87 goals per match.

6 goals

- (South Korea) Park Eun Gi

5 goals

- (Bangladesh) Kazi Salahuddin

2 goals

- (Oman) Abdullah Hamood
- (Iraq) Benyamen Dhenka
- (North Korea) Lee Song Hoo
- (Iraq) Ali Hossain
- (Iraq) Wadim Munnir
- (Iraq) Asam Abdul Razzak
- (Iraq) Ganem Arabi

1 goal

- (South Korea) Bang Eun Choi
- (Bangladesh) Abdul Gaffar
- (Bangladesh) Abdus Salam Murshedy
- (Oman) Mubarak Taqi
- (Thailand) Sutep
- (North Korea) Joo Gan Sang
- (Nepal) Krishna Thapa
- (North Korea) Sin Hak Euk
- (Bangladesh) Ashrafuddin Ahmed Chunnu
- (North Korea) Kim Jong Man
- (Bangladesh) Dewan Shafiul Arefin Tutul
- (South Korea) Kwon Oh-son
- (South Korea) Son Jong Sook
- (Bangladesh) Ashish Bhadra
- (North Korea) Loo Yang Bol
- (South Korea) Joong In Choi
- (South Korea) Joong Soon Taik

1 own goal

- (South Korea) Kwon Oh-son
