= 1986 Bangladesh President's Gold Cup =

Tournament details
- Host country: Bangladesh
- Dates: 17–29 January 1986
- Teams: 7 (from 2 confederations)
- Venue: Dhaka Stadium

Final positions
- Champions: (Switzerland) Vevey Sports (1st title)
- Runners-up: (Finland) Turun Palloseura

Tournament statistics
- Matches played: 22
- Goals scored: 50 (2.27 per match)
- Top scorer(s): (Italy) Gabor Pavoni (Finland) Heikki Suhonen (5 goals)
- Best player: (Switzerland) Patrick Gavillet

The 1986 Bangladesh President's Gold Cup was the fourth edition of the Bangladesh President's Gold Cup. The event was held at the Dhaka Stadium in Dhaka, Bangladesh.

== Venues ==
| Dhaka | 1986 Bangladesh President's Gold Cup is located in Bangladesh |
|---|---|
| Dhaka Stadium | 1986 Bangladesh President's Gold Cup is located in Bangladesh |
| Capacity: 36,000 | 1986 Bangladesh President's Gold Cup is located in Bangladesh |

== Group stage ==
| Pos | Team | Pld | W | D | L | GF | GA | GD | Pts | Qualification |
|---|---|---|---|---|---|---|---|---|---|---|
| 1 | (Switzerland) Vevey Sports | 6 | 4 | 2 | 0 | 12 | 6 | +6 | 10 | Advance to the Final |
| 2 | (Finland) Turun Palloseura | 6 | 4 | 0 | 2 | 14 | 6 | +8 | 8 | Advance to the Final |
| 3 | (North Korea) Wolmido | 6 | 3 | 1 | 2 | 6 | 7 | −1 | 7 | |
| 4 | Syria B | 6 | 1 | 3 | 2 | 6 | 7 | −1 | 5 | |
| 5 | (China) Beijing | 6 | 2 | 0 | 4 | 5 | 9 | −4 | 4 | |
| 6 | Bangladesh Red | 6 | 1 | 2 | 3 | 6 | 8 | −2 | 4 | |
| 7 | Bangladesh Green | 6 | 0 | 4 | 2 | 1 | 7 | −6 | 4 | |

Source: RSSSF

17 January 1986

| Beijing (China) | 2–0 | Bangladesh Green |
|---|---|---|
| Gong Lei 32' (pen.); Jin Changguan 83' | Report |

Dhaka Stadium, Dhaka

18 January 1986

| Wolmido (North Korea) | 0–2 | (Switzerland) Vevey Sports |
|---|---|---|
| | Report | Gabor Pavoni |

Dhaka Stadium, Dhaka

18 January 1986

| Syria B | 1–1 | Bangladesh Red |
|---|---|---|
| Mohammed Kaiser | Report | Liton |

Dhaka Stadium, Dhaka

19 January 1986

| Turun Palloseura (Finland) | 4–0 | (North Korea) Wolmido |
|---|---|---|
| Heikkinen 25'; Li Yong-Chol 37' (o.g.); Suhonen 52'; Vesa Salmela 83' | Report |

Dhaka Stadium, Dhaka

19 January 1986

| Syria B | 0–0 | Bangladesh Green |
|---|---|---|
| | Report |

Dhaka Stadium, Dhaka

20 January 1986

| Beijing (China) | 0–2 | (Finland) Turun Palloseura |
|---|---|---|
| | Report | Aaltonen; Jyrki Näveri 67' |

Dhaka Stadium, Dhaka

20 January 1986

| Vevey Sports (Switzerland) | 3–1 | Bangladesh Red |
|---|---|---|
| Gabor Pavoni; Stéphane De Siebenthal | Report | Aslam |

Dhaka Stadium, Dhaka

21 January 1986

| Wolmido (North Korea) | 1–0 | Syria B |
|---|---|---|
| Chang Chol-Hun 64' | Report |

Dhaka Stadium, Dhaka

21 January 1986

| Vevey Sports (Switzerland) | 1–1 | Bangladesh Green |
|---|---|---|
| Patrick Gavillet | Report | Mostafizur Rahman Mostak |

Dhaka Stadium, Dhaka

22 January 1986

| Turun Palloseura (Finland) | 2–1 | Syria B |
|---|---|---|
| Suhonen 5', 15' | Report | Mohammed Kaiser 58' |

Dhaka Stadium, Dhaka

22 January 1986

| Beijing (China) | 1–0 | Bangladesh Red |
|---|---|---|
| Tang Pengju 42' | Report |

Dhaka Stadium, Dhaka

23 January 1986

| Vevey Sports (Switzerland) | 2–1 | (China) Beijing |
|---|---|---|
| Wenzong Wang (o.g.); Patrick Gavillet 70' | Report | Shen Xiangfu 76' (pen.) |

Dhaka Stadium, Dhaka

23 January 1986

| Wolmido (North Korea) | 0–0 | Bangladesh Green |
|---|---|---|
| | Report |

Dhaka Stadium, Dhaka

24 January 1986

| Syria B | 2–2 | (Switzerland) Vevey Sports |
|---|---|---|
| Jakalan 26', 49' (pen.) | Report | Gabor Pavoni 35', 44' |

Dhaka Stadium, Dhaka

24 January 1986

| Turun Palloseura (Finland) | 1–3 | Bangladesh Red |
|---|---|---|
| Paavola 7' | Report | Aslam 8', 25', 76' |

Dhaka Stadium, Dhaka

25 January 1986

| Beijing (China) | 0–3 | (North Korea) Wolmido |
|---|---|---|
| | Report | Chong Chol-Hun 2', 6', 62' |

Dhaka Stadium, Dhaka

25 January 1986

| Turun Palloseura (Finland) | 4–0 | Bangladesh Green |
|---|---|---|
| Aaltonen; Suhonen; Paavola | Report |

Dhaka Stadium, Dhaka

26 January 1986

| Beijing (China) | 1–2 | Syria B |
|---|---|---|
| Gong Lei 18' | Report | Radwan Al-Sheikh Hassan 8'; Romio Iskander 81' |

Dhaka Stadium, Dhaka

26 January 1986

| Wolmido (North Korea) | 2–1 | Bangladesh Red |
|---|---|---|
| Lee Jong; Cho Go Yang | Report | Elias |

Dhaka Stadium, Dhaka

27 January 1986

| Vevey Sports (Switzerland) | 2–1 | (Finland) Turun Palloseura |
|---|---|---|
| Carlos Fernandez; Schürmann | Report | Heikkinen |

Dhaka Stadium, Dhaka

27 January 1986

| Bangladesh Red | 0–0 | Bangladesh Green |
|---|---|---|
| | Report |

Dhaka Stadium, Dhaka

== Final ==
29 January 1986

| Vevey Sports (Switzerland) | 3–2 (a.e.t.) | (Finland) Turun Palloseura |
|---|---|---|
| Stéphane De Siebenthal 63', 106'; Pascal Cacciapaglia 70' | Report | Suhonen 24'; Aaltonen 57' |

Dhaka Stadium, Dhaka
