= Anton Aaltonen =

Finnish footballer (born 2003)

Personal information
- Date of birth: 28 November 2003 (age 22)
- Place of birth: Finland
- Position: Midfielder

Youth career
- 2011–2021: HJK

Senior career*
Years	Team	Apps	(Gls)
2021–2022	Klubi 04	29	(11)
2022	HJK	0	(0)
2023–2024	Inter Turku	1	(0)
2023–2024	Inter Turku II	46	(9)

International career^{‡}
2018	Finland U16	2	(0)
- * Club domestic league appearances and goals as of 23 October 2024 ‡ National team caps and goals as of 18 February 2024

Anton Aaltonen (born 28 November 2003) is a Finnish professional footballer who most recently played as a midfielder for Veikkausliiga club Inter Turku.

== Club career ==
After playing in HJK organisation, Aaltonen switched teams and joined Inter Turku in January 2023. He made his Veikkausliiga debut with the club in the 2023 season.

== Personal life ==
His father Mika Aaltonen is a futurologist and a former Finnish international footballer.
