= Khurshid Alam Babul =

Bangladeshi footballer

Babul
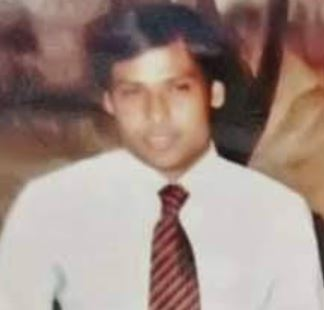
- Babul in 1984

Personal information
- Full name: Khurshid Alam Babul
- Date of birth: 1 March 1955 (age 71)
- Place of birth: Tangail, East Bengal, Pakistan (present-day Bangladesh)
- Height: 1.70 m (5 ft 7 in)
- Position: Defensive midfielder

Senior career*
Years	Team	Apps	(Gls)
1973	Unisporting Versailles		
1974	Dhaka		
1975–1976	Victoria		
1977–1986	Abahani Krira Chakra		
1987–1990	Mohammedan		

International career
1975	Bangladesh U19		
1976–1987	Bangladesh		
Medal record
Representing Bangladesh
South Asian Games
Silver medal – second place	1984
Silver medal – second place	1985
- * Club domestic league appearances and goals

Khurshid Alam Babul (Bengali: খুরশিদ আলম বাবুল) is a retired former Bangladeshi footballer. A defensive midfielder, he achieved most of his success while playing for Abahani Krira Chakra in the Dhaka First Division League during his decade-long spell with the club starting in 1977. He won league title with Abahani in 1977, 1981, 1983, 1984 and 1985. In 1987 he won the title with Mohammedan. Thus he joined an elite list of players who had won the First Division title with both clubs. He also represented Bangladesh national team, and was captain in 1979, 1983 and again in 1986.

== Early life ==
Khurshid Alam Babul was born on 1 March 1955 in Tangail, Bangladesh. He started playing football while studying at East Bengal Institution & College in Old Dhaka, however, he never got a chance to play for the school team.

== Club career ==
=== Early career ===
Babul began his career in Dhaka with Unisporting Versailles in the Third Division in 1973. The following year, he joined Dhaka Sporting Club in the Second Division. While playing in the Second Division, Babul secured a place in the Bangladesh U19 team, following trials conducted in Dhaka and Comilla. In 1975, Babul began playing in the First Division with Victoria Sporting Club under coach Abdur Rahim. He remained at the club as a bindings player for two seasons.

=== Abahani Krira Chakra ===
In 1977, Babul joined Abahani Krira Chakra, playing in a 4-2-4 system, where he formed a midfield partnership with Amalesh Sen, after Monwar Hossain Nannu, once regarded as the country's best creative midfielder, had moved to a defensive role following an injury. He remained a consistent performer as Abahani won the league title as unbeaten champions, defeating Rahmatganj MFS in the title decider during which Babul scored in a 3–1 victory at the Dhaka Stadium. In the same year, Abahani reached the semi-finals of the Aga Khan Gold Cup, where they eventually lost 2–0 to the eventual champions, Sepid-Rud of Iran.

He was appointed club captain in 1981, and formed a formidable midfield partnership with Ashish Bhadra, as Abahani went on to lift the First Division League title, edging out their rivals Mohammedan SC and Team BJMC. Babul's midfield partnership with Ashish would remain instrumental as the Sky Blues secured hat-trick league triumphs in 1984. He also represented the club at the 1985–86 Asian Club Championship held in Colombo, Sri Lanka. In the same year, he won his final league title with the club before ending his decade-long stay at Abahani in 1987.

=== Mohammedan SC ===
Following their league hat-trick in 1985, Abahani lost their grip of the title to arch-rivals Mohammedan SC in 1986. The Abahani management felt the need for change and reckoned that Babul was past his prime, leading to his release in 1987. Eventually, it was Mohammedan who signed the aging Babul that season.

Under coach Nasser Hejazi, Babul flourished in the Mohammedan midfield alongside Emeka Ezeugo and Reza Naalchegar. During the season, he scored a notable solo goal against Nepal's Manang Marshyangdi Club in a 6–2 victory at the 1987 Asian Club Championship in Dhaka. However, his most notable goal for the club came during the final league match against Abahani, where the latter needed a draw to secure the title. With the game heading for a 2–2 draw, veteran Bablu scored the winning goal for the Black and Whites in the 81st minute from a Ranjit Saha cross. As both teams finished with equal points, play-off matches were required. After a 0–0 draw in the first play-off match, Mohammedan secured the title with a 2–0 win in the second play-off match, which was played behind closed doors due to crowd violence. Thus, Bablu joined an elite group of players to win the First Division League title with both Dhaka giants. He retired in 1990, by which time he had become an irregular presence in the starting eleven.

== International career ==
In 1974, Babul successfully trialed for the Bangladesh U19 in both Dhaka and Comilla, under a Russian coach, and was included in the final squad for the 1975 AFC Youth Championship. The team coached by Noor Hossain, lost all four group-stage games in the tournament held in Kuwait. In 1976, Babul debuted for the Bangladesh national team at the 1976 King's Cup in Bangkok, Thailand. He withdrew from the 1978 Asian Games squad alongside other Abahani players, after the national captaincy was stripped off Abahani's Monwar Hossain Nannu. Babul returned to the team in 1979, during the 1980 AFC Asian Cup qualifiers held in Dhaka. He also captained the team against South Korea B during an exhibition match at the Dhaka Stadium. He then represented the team at the 1980 AFC Asian Cup held in Kuwait.

Bablu also featured for the national team in the Bangladesh President's Gold Cup during the 1981, 1982, 1983 and 1986 editions, captaining the team in 1983. His last appearances at the tournament came while captaining Bangladesh Blue (B national team) at the 1987 edition. Babul was part of the national team during both the 1982 Asian Games and 1986 Asian Games, captaining the team during the latter. Babul also featured for the team at the 1984 AFC Asian Cup qualifiers, 1984 South Asian Games, 1986 FIFA World Cup qualifiers, 1985 South Asian Games, 1985 Quaid-e-Azam International Tournament and lastly at the 1987 South Asian Games.

== Career statistics ==
=== International goals ===
List of international goals scored by Khurshid Alam Babul
No.	Date	Venue	Opponent	Score	Result	Competition	Ref.
1	22 November 1987	Salt Lake Stadium, Calcutta, India	Bhutan	1–0	3–0	1987 South Asian Games	

== Personal life ==
Babul was part of the Bangladesh national team selection committee from 1992 to 2002, the team manager of the national football team during the 2000 tour of England and also a member of the Bangladesh Football Federation (BFF) from 1996 to 2000. In 2008, he served as the chairman of BFF's Futsal Committee. In the same year, BFF organized the first-ever Citycell Futsal Football Competition. He ran for the vice-president role in the 2012 BFF elections but eventually lost.

In 2012, Babul was awarded the National Sports Award for his outstanding contribution to Bangladesh football. His long time midfield partner Ashish Bhadra also won the award in the same year.

== Honours ==
Abahani Krira Chakra

- Dhaka First Division League: 1977, 1981, 1983, 1984, 1985
- Federation Cup: 1982, 1985, 1986
- Liberation Cup: 1977

Mohammedan SC

- Dhaka First Division League: 1987, 1988–89
- Federation Cup: 1987, 1989

Bangladesh

- South Asian Games Silver medal: 1984, 1985

Individual

- 1983 − Sports Writers Association's Best Footballer Award.
- 2012 − National Sports Award.
- Unknown year − Dhaka University Blue

== Bibliography ==
- Tariq, T Islam (2025). মোহামেডান-আবাহনী ময়দানি লড়াই (transl. Mohammedan-Abahani battle field) (in Bengali). Annesha Prokashon. ISBN 978-984-99475-1-6.
- Alam, Masud (2017). ফুটবলের গল্প ফুটবলারদের গল্প (transl. The story of football the story of footballers) (in Bengali). Bishhoshahitto Bhobon. ISBN 9789849134688.
- Mahmud, Dulal (2018). আমাদের ফুটবলাররা (transl. Our Footballers) (in Bengali). Agamee Prakashani.
- Mahmud, Dulal (2020). খেলার মাঠে মুক্তিযুদ্ধ (transl. Liberation war in the playground) (in Bengali). Bishhoshahitto Bhobon. ISBN 978-984-8218-31-0.
