= 1989 Bangladesh President's Gold Cup =

Tournament details
- Host country: Bangladesh
- Dates: 21–31 May 1989
- Teams: 7 (from 1 confederation)
- Venue(s): Mirpur Stadium

Final positions
- Champions: Bangladesh Red (1st title)
- Runners-up: (South Korea) Korea University

Tournament statistics
- Matches played: 12
- Goals scored: 22 (1.83 per match)
- Top scorer(s): (South Korea) Song Ju-seok (3 goals)

The 1989 Bangladesh President's Gold Cup was the sixth edition of the Bangladesh President's Gold Cup. The event was held at the Mirpur Stadium in Dhaka, Bangladesh.

== Venues ==
Dhaka	1989 Bangladesh President's Gold Cup is located in Bangladesh
Mirpur Stadium	1989 Bangladesh President's Gold Cup is located in Bangladesh
Capacity: 25,000	1989 Bangladesh President's Gold Cup is located in Bangladesh

== Group stage ==
=== Group A ===
Pos	Team	Pld	W	D	L	GF	GA	GD	Pts	Qualification
1	Bangladesh Green	3	2	1	0	3	1	+2	5	Advance to the semi-finals
2	(South Korea) Korea University	3	1	2	0	4	2	+2	4	Advance to the semi-finals
3	India	3	0	2	1	1	2	−1	2	
4	(China) Liaoning	3	0	1	2	2	5	−3	1	

Source: RSSSF
22 May 1989

Liaoning (China)	1–1	India
Moonwi	Report	Pappachan

Mirpur Stadium, Dhaka
22 May 1989

Bangladesh Green	1–1	(South Korea) Korea University
Ayaz Ahmed	Report	Song Ju-seok

Mirpur Stadium, Dhaka

24 May 1989

Korea University (South Korea)	3–1	(China) Liaoning
Kim Sang-moon; Kim Sang In	Report	Huyang Choo

Mirpur Stadium, Dhaka
24 May 1989

Bangladesh Green	1–0	India
Iqbalur Rahman Iqbal 76'	Report

Mirpur Stadium, Dhaka

26 May 1989

India	0–0	(South Korea) Korea University
	Report

Mirpur Stadium, Dhaka

27 May 1989

Bangladesh Green	1–0	(China) Liaoning
Li Ko Yang 73' (o.g.)	Report

Mirpur Stadium, Dhaka

=== Group B ===
Pos	Team	Pld	W	D	L	GF	GA	GD	Pts	Qualification
1	Iran B	2	1	1	0	1	0	+1	3	Advance to the semi-finals
2	Bangladesh Red	2	0	2	0	1	1	0	2	Advance to the semi-finals
3	Thailand B	2	0	1	1	1	2	−1	1	
4	(United States) Seahorses	0	0	0	0	0	0	0	0	Withdrawn

Source: RSSSF
21 May 1989

Bangladesh Red	1–1	Thailand B
Aslam	Report	Suan Rakha

Mirpur Stadium, Dhaka

23 May 1989

Iran B	1–0	Thailand B
Masoud	Report

Mirpur Stadium, Dhaka

25 May 1989

Bangladesh Red	0–0	Iran B
	Report

Mirpur Stadium, Dhaka

== Knockout stage ==
=== Semi-finals ===
28 May 1989

Bangladesh Green	0–1	Bangladesh Red
	Report	Sabbir

Mirpur Stadium, Dhaka

29 May 1989

Iran B	3–3	(South Korea) Korea University
Mujhid Maleh; Madekhi	Report	Seo Jung-won; Song Ju-seok
Penalties
Mujhid Haji (penalty scored); Mujhid Saleh (penalty scored); Samud (penalty scored); ? (penalty missed); ? (penalty missed)	3–4	Sung Joo-sura (penalty scored); Kim Yang-soo (penalty scored); Noh Jung-yoon (penalty scored); Kim Sang-moon (penalty scored)

Mirpur Stadium, Dhaka

=== Final ===
31 May 1989

Bangladesh Red	1–1	(South Korea) Korea University
Aslam 53'	Report	Seo Jung-won 87'
Penalties
Kaiser (penalty scored); Aslam (penalty scored); Rumi (penalty scored); Sabbir (penalty scored)	4–3	Huh Ki-tae (penalty scored); Hong Myung-bo (penalty scored); Kim Byung-soo (penalty scored); ? (penalty missed); ? (penalty missed)

Mirpur Stadium, Dhaka
Attendance: 47,345
Referee: Sagar Sen (India)

== Final incident ==
In the 69th minute of the final between Bangladesh Red and Korea University, Korean players confronted Indian referee Sagar Sen, demanding a penalty for a perceived foul in the penalty box by Imtiaz Sultan Johnny on Huh Ki-tae. When Sen showed a red card to Korean captain Song Ju-seok for his aggressive confrontation, tensions escalated as the players violently pursued the referee once again. The match had to be halted for 11 minutes due to the chaos.

== Statistics ==
=== Goalscorers ===
There were 22 goals scored in 12 matches, for an average of 1.83 goals per match.

3 goals

- (South Korea) Song Ju-seok

2 goals

- (Iran) Madekhi
- (Bangladesh) Sheikh Mohammad Aslam
- (South Korea) Seo Jung-won
- (South Korea) Kim Sang In

1 goal

- (Iran) Mujhid Maleh
- (Bangladesh) Rumman Bin Wali Sabbir
- (Iran) Masoud
- (Thailand) Suan Rakha
- (Bangladesh) Iqbalur Rahman Iqbal
- (South Korea) Sang-moon Kim
- (China) Huyang Choo
- (Bangladesh) Ayaz Ahmed
- (India) C. V. Pappachan
- (China) Moonwi

1 own goal

- (China) Li Ko Yang (against Bangladesh Green)
