= Ashish Bhadra =

Bangladeshi footballer

Personal information
- Full name: Ashish Kumar Bhadra
- Date of birth: 14 March 1960 (age 66)
- Place of birth: Chittagong, East Pakistan (present-day Bangladesh)
- Height: 1.71 m (5 ft 7 in)
- Positions: Central midfielder; attacking midfielder

Youth career
- 1976–1978: Kazi Deuri Khawaja RC

Senior career*
Years	Team	Apps	(Gls)
1978–1981	Rahmatganj MFS		
1981–1984	Dhaka Abahani		
1984	Mohammedan SC		
1985–1990	Dhaka Abahani		

International career
1978–1980	Bangladesh U19		
1978–1988	Bangladesh		
Medal record
Representing Bangladesh
South Asian Games
Silver medal – second place	1985
- * Club domestic league appearances and goals

Ashish Bhadra (Bengali: আশীষ ভদ্র; born 14 March 1960) is a retired Bangladeshi footballer. An attacking midfielder, he achieved most of his laurels while playing for Abahani Krira Chakra in the Dhaka First Division League. He was a big factor in Abahani dominating the Dhaka football scene in the early 1980s.

He also represented the Bangladesh national team with great distinction and was captain during all six games of the 1986 FIFA World Cup qualifiers. He has scored 5 official international goals for his country.

== Early years ==
Ashish's journey started from school football. In 1976, he played Chittagong First Division League for Kazi Deuri Khawaja Recreation Club. He was the captain of the club in 1977 while still being a college student. Former footballer Iqbal Khan, the father of cricketer Tamim Iqbal, helped him during his time playing in the Chittagong Division. In 1977, he played for Chittagong in a zonal match with Sylhet in the Sher-e-Bangla Cup. His team won 3–1, with Ashish scoring a brace, this performance earned him an invitation to the Dhaka First Division League the following year.

In 1978, Ashish joined Rahmatganj MFS at the age of 18. He performed well during his first league game, which came against Brothers Union, and went on to become an integral part of the team for the following three years. In 1981, he joined Abahani Krira Chakra as the long-term replacement for the clubs legendary midfielder and former captain Amalesh Sen.

== Club career ==
At Abahani, Ashish was part of a formidable midfield duo alongside Khurshid Alam Babul. However, initially the partnership took a bit of time to gel. And in the 1981 Federation Cup final against arch rivals Mohammedan SC, it was Badal Roy, the Mohammedan SC captain who reigned supreme as his team won 2–0.

Abahani took revenge in the League match winning 2–0 as the Ashish-Babul combination started to work together well. Abahani clinched the title and remained unbeaten till the very last match of the campaign. With the title already in their grasp, the sky blues lost their final match against Team BJMC 1–0 with Basudev scoring the only goal of the match. Ashish's biggest moment came late in the season when he scored a hattrick against an Indonesia's Persipal Palu in the final edition of the Aga Khan Gold Cup football tournament in Dhaka. The sky blues won the match 5–0.

In the 1985–86 Asian Club Championship, Ashish was prolific, he scored a brace against Club Valencia of Maldives, as Abahani won the game 8–1. His third and final goal in the tournament came against Sri Lankan club Saunders SC, in a 4–1 victory.

In 1983, he captained Abahani to the First Division title as unbeaten champions. Other than his lone year with Mohammedan SC in 1984, Ashish spent the rest of his career at Abahani. He hung up his boots after lifting the domestic league title one last time in 1990. He has 59 goals and 170 assists in his playing career of 20 years.

== International career ==
In 1978 and 1980, Ashish represented the Bangladesh U19 team at the Asian Youth Championships. During the 1978 AFC Youth Championship held in Dhaka, Ashish scored against Singapore U19 in a 2–2 draw. During the qualifiers for the 1980 AFC Youth Championship, Ashish scored in a 5–1 drubbing of Nepal U19, as Bangladesh qualified for the main tournament, in Bangkok, Thailand. In March 1981, Ashish represented the Bangladesh (Red) team in the first President's Gold Cup in the Dhaka. The red team managed by Bangladesh U19 coach Gafur Baloch, mainly consisted of players that took part in the Asian Youth Championships a month prior. The team reached the finals after beating a North Korean club in the tiebreaker as the match ended 1–1 in regulation time. Ashish had scored the equalizer for the Red team. Eventually his side lost 2–0 in the final to the South Korean University team.

After performing well in the Youth Championship in 1978, Ashish along with many other players from the Bangladesh U19 team were given a chance to play for the senior team at the 1978 Asian Games, by German coach Werner Bickelhaupt. In 1980, Bangladesh coach at the time, Abdur Rahim, also included Ashish in the squad for the 1980 AFC Asian Cup. He notably scored first during a 2–1 win over Malaysia in the 1982 Asian Games. This was Bangladesh's first victory at the Asian Games, with Badal Roy scoring the all-important goal. Ashish remained an integral part of the national team throughout the 80s alongside his midfield partner for club and country, Khurshid Alam Babul. In the summer of 1985, he was elected as the national team captain for the 1986 FIFA World Cup qualifiers, and scored the opening goal at the Salt Lake Stadium, Kolkata, against India during their last qualifying match. Nonetheless, the Indians, eventually won 2–1.

== International goals ==
=== Bangladesh U19 ===
#	Date	Venue	Opponent	Score	Result	Competition
1.	7 October 1978	Bangabandhu National Stadium, Dhaka, Bangladesh	Singapore	1–2	2–2	1978 AFC Youth Championship
2.	14 December 1980	Bangabandhu National Stadium, Dhaka, Bangladesh	Nepal		5–1	1980 AFC Youth Championship qualifiers

=== Bangladesh national team ===
#	Date	Venue	Opponent	Score	Result	Competition
1.	16 February 1982	National Stadium, Karachi, Pakistan	Nepal	1–1	1–1	1982 Quaid-e-Azam International Tournament
2.	24 November 1982	Ambedkar Stadium, New Delhi, India	Malaysia	1–0	2–1	1982 Asian Games
3.	22 September 1983	Stadium Merdeka, Kuala Lumpur, Indonesia	Nepal	1–0	1–0	1983 Merdeka Tournament
4.	12 April 1985	Salt Lake Stadium, Kolkata, India	India	1–0	1–2	1986 FIFA World Cup qualifiers
5.	2 May 1985	Qayyum Stadium, Peshawar, Pakistan	Pakistan	2–1	3–1	1985 Quaid-e-Azam International Tournament

== Awards ==
In 2012, Ashish was awarded the national sports award for his outstanding contribution to Bangladesh football.

== Honours ==
Abahani Krira Chakra

- Dhaka First Division League: 1981, 1983, 1985, 1989–90
- Federation Cup: 1982, 1985, 1986, 1988
- Independence Cup: 1990
- Sait Nagjee Trophy: 1989

Mohammedan SC

- Dhaka First Division League: 1984

Bangladesh

- South Asian Games Silver medal: 1985

=== Awards and accolades ===
- 2012 − National Sports Award.

== Bibliography ==
- Alam, Masud (2017). ফুটবলের গল্প ফুটবলারদের গল্প (transl. The story of football the story of footballers) (in Bengali). Bishhoshahitto Bhobon. ISBN 9789849134688.
- Dulal, Mahmud (2020). খেলার মাঠে মুক্তিযুদ্ধ (transl. Liberation war in the playground) (in Bengali). Bishhoshahitto Bhobon. ISBN 978-984-8218-31-0.
- Tariq, T Islam (2025). মোহামেডান-আবাহনী ময়দানি লড়াই (transl. Mohammedan-Abahani battle field) (in Bengali). Annesha Prokashon. ISBN 978-984-99475-1-6.
