= Azmat Ali =

Bangladeshi footballer (1956–2022)

- Azmat in the 80s

Personal information
- Full name: Mohamed Azmat Ali
- Date of birth: 15 March 1956
- Place of birth: Gazipur, East Pakistan (present-day Bangladesh)
- Date of death: 29 November 2022 (aged 66)
- Place of death: Gazipur, Bangladesh
- Height: 1.66 m (5 ft 5 1/2 in)
- Position: Center-back

Senior career*
Years	Team	Apps	(Gls)
1976	The Muslim Institute		
1977	Mohammedan SC		
1978–1979	Brothers Union		
1980	Team BJMC		
1981–1982	Brothers Union		
1983–1984	Mohammedan SC		
1985–1989	Brothers Union		
1990	Farashganj SC		
1991–1992	Brothers Union		

International career
1980–1981	Bangladesh U19		
1982–1987	Bangladesh		
- * Club domestic league appearances and goals

Azmat Ali (Bengali: আজ়মত আলী; 15 March 1956 – 29 November 2022) was a Bangladeshi footballer and coach.

== Club career ==
In 1976, Azmat impressed during a local tournament in Gazipur against a team that included star players from Mohammedan SC, one of whom, Mohammed Mala, brought him to Dhaka Third Division League club, The Muslim Institute, for the league final against Shajahanpur SC. Despite the defeat in the final, his performance caught the attention of Mohammedan's General Secretary, Aman Chowdhury, who signed him to a Tk 10,000 contract in 1977.

In the First Division, he missed the league's first phase and would eventually make his debut in the Super League against Brothers Union, a club which he would join the following year, after appearing only four times for Mohammedan. During the 1981–82 Aga Khan Gold Cup final against Bangkok Bank, Azmat produced the best performance in his career as Brothers won the tournament as joint champions.

== International career ==
In 1980, Azmat featured for the Bangladesh U19 team during the 1980 AFC Youth Championship qualifiers and went on to represent the team in the main event the following year. In 1981, Abdul Gafur Baloch, the U19 national team coach, gave him the opportunity to play in the first Bangladesh President's Gold Cup with the Bangladesh Red team. Although almost entirely composed of players who had participated in the AFC Youth Championship earlier that year, they managed to outshine the senior national team (Bangladesh Green) and finish as runners-up in the tournament.

In 1982, he made his debut for the Bangladesh national team during Pakistan's Quaid-e-Azam International Tournament, under coach Gafur Baloch. Azmat captained the national team during both the 1986 Pakistan President's Cup and 1987 Quaid-e-Azam International Tournament. He also captained the second-string national team (Bangladesh Green) during the 1986 Bangladesh President's Cup. He was also an integral part of the senior national team's defence line during the 1986 FIFA World Cup qualifiers alongside Kaiser Hamid, AKM Abdul Baten and Imtiaz Sultan Johnny.

== Post-playing career ==
Azmat served as coach of Dhanmondi Club and Bangladesh Navy, following his retirement as a player in 1992.

== Death ==
In June 2018, Azmat was involved in a road accident which left him with severe head injury.

In November 2021, he was handed Tk10 lakh from Prime Minister Sheikh Hasina for the treatment of his heart disease.

On 29 November 2022, Azmat died at his residence in Gazipur Sadar.

== Honours ==
Brothers Union

- Aga Khan Gold Cup: 1981–82

Mohammedan SC

- Federation Cup: 1983
