= Ryszard Wójcik =

Polish football referee (born 1956)

- Born: 6 June 1956 (age 70); Opole, Poland

Domestic
Years	League	Role
1988–2002	Ekstraklasa	Referee

International
Years	League	Role
1990–2001	FIFA-listed	Referee

Ryszard Wójcik (born 6 June 1956) is a Polish former football referee who is best known for refereeing a match at the 1998 FIFA World Cup and two at the 1991 FIFA World Youth Championship in Portugal.

He was born in Opole in 1956 and refereed over 300 matches in the Polish Football League. In 1991, he refereed two matches at the FIFA World Youth Championship - a group stage match between Brazil and the Ivory Coast which ended 2-1 and a further quarter-final in which Portugal defeated Mexico 2-1.

In 1998 he was selected to referee in that year's World Cup in France as a UEFA representative. He refereed one match - a group match between the Netherlands and South Korea which the Dutch won 5-0.

He also refereed the 1999 UEFA Super Cup, which Lazio won 1-0. Amongst others, he has refereed matches in the UEFA Champions League. He retired in 2002.
