= Mika Aaltonen =

Finnish futurologist and footballer (born 1965)

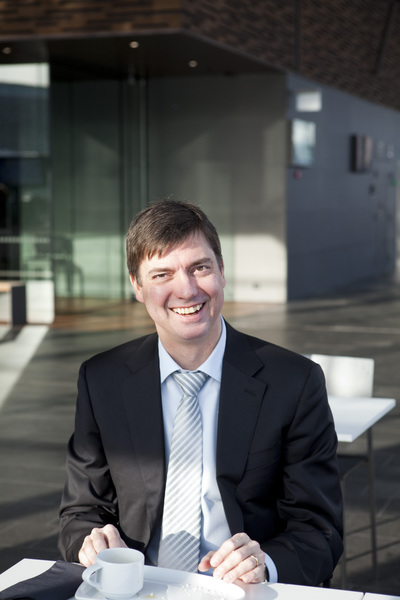
- Born: 16 November 1965 (age 60); Turku, Finland
- Education: Master of Economics 1994, Turku School of Economics; Ph.D. (economics) 1997, Turku School of Economics associate professor (Foresight & Complexity) 2004, Lappeenranta University of Technology
- Known for: Arctic Strategy, Sustainability Manifesto, Brave New World, The Third Lens, Robustness, scoring the winning goal in Inter Milan vs FC Turku (TPS) in San Siro in 1987

Mika Aaltonen (born 16 November 1965) is a Finnish futurologist and former footballer. His position was an attacking central midfielder. He also played for the Finnish national team. Aaltonen is a Ph.D. in economics, associate professor (Foresight and Complexity), founder of the Royal Society of Arts Helsinki Chapter, editorial board member of European Foresight Journal, and editorial board member of E:CO (Emergence: Complexity and Organisations journal).

== Playing career ==
Mika Aaltonen
Personal information
- Date of birth: 16 November 1965 (age 60)
- Place of birth: Turku, Finland
- Height: 1.80 m (5 ft 11 in)
- Position: Midfielder

Senior career*
Years	Team	Apps	(Gls)
1982–1987	TPS	85	(12)
1987–1988	Inter Milan	0	(0)
1988	→ Bellinzona (loan)	14	(3)
1988–1989	→ Bologna (loan)	3	(0)
1989–1990	Hertha BSC	12	(0)
1990–1993	TPS	86	(7)
1993–1994	Hapoel Be'er Sheva	14	(3)
1994	TPV	5	(1)

International career
1988–1994	Finland	18	(1)
- * Club domestic league appearances and goals

After being selected the key player of the Finnish league and the best player of the under 21 national team, Aaltonen signed, at the age of 21 years, a three years contract with Inter Milan. He played for Inter one friendly game: Inter Milan (All. Trapattoni – Zenga – Bergomi, Baresi, Ferri, Brehme – Berti, Aaltonen, Mattheus – Rummenigge, Serena, Diaz) vs Soviet Union.

During his career (1982–1994) he played in Finland, Italy, Switzerland, Germany, and Israel for Turun Palloseura, Inter Milan, Bellinzona, Bologna, Hertha BSC, Hapoel Be'er Sheva F.C. and Tampereen Pallo-Veikot. Aaltonen won 1 gold, 2 silver, 1 bronze and 1 Cup in Finland; 1 bronze in Israeli league (Hapoel Beer Sheva) and 1 Second Bundesliga title (Hertha Berlin). He finished his career at a relatively young age because of a persistent ankle injury, and because of this, he ended up concentrating more on his studies. Aaltonen studied throughout his playing career, and after he retired from football, he earned a doctorate degree in economics.

Aaltonen is best remembered for a goal scored against Italian goalkeeper Walter Zenga in UEFA Cup in 1987 during a match between Turun Palloseura and Inter Milan at the San Siro stadium in Milan. This goal more or less earned him a transfer to Inter shortly afterwards.

== Later career ==
Aaltonen has worked as a visiting researcher at the London School of Economics (UK), the Conservatoire national des arts et métiers (France) and the Gregorian University (Italy).

He is a co-founder of PORT 2.0 Ltd., a company pioneering the design and construction of new logistics facilities to meet the increasing challenges of sustainability, safety and efficiency in near shore and onshore logistics.

Aaltonen is the chairman of Sustainable Nation Group, a company focused in building up new analytic capabilities to climate change transformation.

He has written 16 books and over 100 articles about foresight, complex adaptive systems, decision-making and societal change.

== Personal life ==
Aaltonen lives in Helsinki, but was born in Heideken, Turku, got married in Turku Cathedral, is an alumnus of the year at Turku School of Economics, and a hall of fame football player at FC Turku (TPS).

His son Anton Aaltonen is a professional footballer for FC Inter Turku.

== Career statistics ==
=== Club ===
As of 31 December 2020

Appearances and goals by club, season and competition
Club	Season	League			National cup (Note: Includes Suomen Cup and DFB-Pokal)		Continental		Total	
Club	Season	Division	Apps	Goals	Apps	Goals	Apps	Goals	Apps	Goals
TPS	1982	Mestaruussarja	3	0			—		3	0
TPS	1983	Mestaruussarja	9	1			—		9	1
TPS	1984	Mestaruussarja	18	1			—		18	1
TPS	1985	Mestaruussarja	17	1			1 (Note: Includes UEFA Cup)	0	18	1
TPS	1986	Mestaruussarja	19	3			—		19	3
TPS	1987	Mestaruussarja	20	8			4	3	24	11
TPS	Total		86	14			5	3	91	17
Inter Milan	1987–88	Serie A	0	0	0	0	0	0	0	0
Inter Milan	1988–89	Serie A	0	0	0	0	0	0	0	0
Inter Milan	Total		0	0	0	0	0	0	0	0
Bellinzona (loan)	1987–88	Swiss Super League	14	3	—		—		14	3
Bologna (loan)	1988–89	Serie A	3	0	—		4 (Note: Includes Mitropa Cup)	1	7	1
Hertha BSC	1989–90	2. Bundesliga	12	0	2	0	—		14	0
TPS	1990	Veikkausliiga	11	2	—		2	0	11	2
TPS	1991	Veikkausliiga	32	2	—		—		32	2
TPS	1992	Veikkausliiga	16	0	—		1 (Note: Includes UEFA Cup Winners' Cup)	0	17	0
TPS	1993	Veikkausliiga	28	3	—		—		28	3
TPS	Total		87	7	0	0	3	0	90	7
Hapoel Be'er Sheva	1993–94	Liga Leumit	14	0	—		—		14	0
TPV	1994	Veikkausliiga	5	1	—		—		5	1
Career total			220	21	2	0	12	4	234	25

=== International ===
Appearances and goals by national team and year
National team	Year	Apps	Goals
Finland	1988	3	0
Finland	1989	2	0
Finland	1990	3	1
Finland	1991	0	0
Finland	1992	0	0
Finland	1993	2	0
Finland	1994	8	0
Total		18	1

=== International goals ===
As of match played 15 February 1990. Finland score listed first, score column indicates score after each Aaltonen goal.

List of international goals scored by Mika Aaltonen
No.	Date	Venue	Opponent	Score	Result	Competition
1	15 February 1990	Mohammed Al-Hamad Stadium, Hawally, Kuwait	Kuwait	1–0	1–0	Friendly

== Bibliography ==
=== Books ===
- Organisational Complexity (2003) with Associate Professor Auli Keskinen & LSE Professor Eve Mitleton-Kelly, FFRC Publications.
- Complexity as a Sensemaking Framework (2005) with Doctor Theodor Barth, SFI Professor John L. Casti, LSE Professor Eve Mitleton-Kelly & Director Irene T. Sanders, FFRC – publications.
- Robustness – Anticipatory and Adaptive Human Systems (2010), Emergent Publications.
- Mr & Mrs Future. Five Big Questions (2012) with Danish futurist Rolf Jensen, shortlisted for the best economic book by SEFE, Talentum.
- The Renaissance Society (2013) with Danish futurist Rolf Jensen, McGrawHill.
- Crossroads. Transformations on the road to 2040 (2015) with American analyst Michael Loescher, Aalto University.
- The Third Lens. Multi-ontology Sense-making and Strategic Decision-making (2016), 2nd edition, Routledge.
- Tomorrow's Society – Conditions for Well-being (2019), AlmaMedia.
- Artificial Intelligence – Man and Machine (2020), AlmaMedia.
- Education in the 2020s. Hope, and Where It Comes From (2021), Edukustannus.

=== Articles ===
- Circular Cause, Time and Narrativity. International Journal of Management Concepts and Philosophy. Vol. 2, No. 3, 183–193, (2007).
- Chronotope space – Managing the complex trade-offs between the properties of the strategic landscape and the time frame being considered. Foresight. Vol 9, No 4, 58–62, (2007), Emerald LiteratiNetwork 2008 Highly Commended Award.
- Future's Education. A Multi-ontology Approach. In: Thinking About the Future. Strategic Anticipation and RAHS. Singapore National Security Coordination Secretariat, 31–40, (2008).
- Evaluation and Organization of Futures Research Methodology – Version 3.0. Futures Research Methodology – Version 3.0, The Millennium Project Publication (2009).
- Emergence and Design in Foresight Methods, European Foresight Platform Brief No. 180 (2010).
- Knowledge, Time-space Contexts and Management, Philosophy of Management. Vol. 10, No 3, 79-85, (2011).
- Arctic Storm. Transformation in Transportation and the Emergence of Finland in the World Stage (2013), with American analyst Michael Loescher, Lapland Publication.
- A Manifesto for a Sustainable Planet (2015), with Shell scenario planner Ian Dunlop & UN Policy Planning Chief Tapio Kanninen, foreword by president Tarja Halonen, Helsinki Sustainability Center Publications.
- The Future of Facilitation. Leadership, Influence and Impact in Disruptive Times, with awarded facilitator Paolo Martinez, IAF Publication (2021).
- Brave New World. Transformations in Transport, and the Consequences They Entail, Finest Bay Area Development/Smart City Innovation Cluster Publication (2023).

== Sources ==
- Jalkapallon Pikkujättiläinen (WSOY 2003) ISBN 978-951-0-27037-0
- The Royal Society of Arts Journal, August 2007
- La Gazzetta dello Sport, 7 Settembre 2019
