= Vyacheslav Fomin =

Russian footballer

Personal information
- Full name: Vyacheslav Viktorovich Fomin
- Date of birth: 7 March 1969 (age 57)
- Height: 1.66 m (5 ft 5 1/2 in)
- Position: Midfielder

Youth career
- EShVSM Moscow

Senior career*
Years	Team	Apps	(Gls)
1986–1989	PFC CSKA-2 Moscow	87	(5)
1989–1993	FC Krylia Sovetov Samara	104	(12)
1993–1998	FC Neftekhimik Nizhnekamsk	120	(9)
- * Club domestic league appearances and goals

Vyacheslav Viktorovich Fomin (Russian: Вячеслав Викторович Фомин; born 7 March 1969) is a former Russian football player.
