= Heikki Suhonen =

Finnish footballer (born 1951)

Personal information
- Date of birth: 21 June 1953 (age 73)
- Place of birth: Turku, Finland
- Height: 1.81 m (5 ft 11 in)
- Position: Forward

Senior career*
Years	Team	Apps	(Gls)
1969–1972	TPS		
1972–1974	HJK		
1974–1986	TPS		

International career
1971–1979	Finland	20	(2)

Managerial career
- 1989–1990: TPS
- 1991: TPS
- * Club domestic league appearances and goals

Heikki Suhonen (born 21 June 1951) is a Finnish former football player and manager who played as a forward for Turun Palloseura (TPS) and HJK Helsinki.

== Honours ==
- Finnish Championship: 1968, 1971, 1972, 1975
