= Rumman Bin Wali Sabbir =

Bangladeshi footballer

Personal information
- Full name: Sayed Rumman Bin Wali Sabbir
- Date of birth: 5 June 1968 (age 58)
- Place of birth: Kushtia, East Pakistan (present-day Bangladesh)
- Height: 1.65 m (5 ft 5 in)
- Positions: Attacking midfielder; right winger

Senior career*
Years	Team	Apps	(Gls)
1985–1986	Dhanmondi Club		
1987–1996	Dhaka Mohammedan		
1991	Kolkata Mohammedan		
1997	Rahmatganj MFS		

International career
1986	Bangladesh U16	3	(2)
1988	Bangladesh U20	2	(0)
1991	Bangladesh U23	8	(2)
1987–1993	Bangladesh	28	(4)
Medal record
Men's football
Representing Bangladesh
South Asian Games
Silver medal – second place	1989 Islamabad	Team competition
Bronze medal – third place	1991 Colombo	Team competition
- * Club domestic league appearances and goals

Syed Rumman Bin Wali Sabbir (Bengali: সৈয়দ রুম্মান বিন ওয়ালী সাব্বির; born 5 June 1968), is a Bangladeshi former footballer. He played for Mohammedan Sporting Club (MSC) in the First Division League during the 1980s and 1990s. He made several appearances for the Bangladesh national football team, appearing in the 1990 FIFA World Cup qualifying rounds. He is commonly regarded as the "Maradona of Bangladesh".

== Success with Mohammedan ==
Sabbir joined Mohammedan in 1987. And he played a key role in MSC winning the double, the Federation Cup plus the First Division league title. In the Federation Cup final they defeated their great rival of the 1950s, Dhaka Wanderers 1–0. In the league the MSC side trailed Abahani for most of season, but following an impressive 3–2 victory for MSC in the final match of the regular season, the two teams were tied at the top. The 1st replay saw a 0–0 draw but Mohammedan clinched the title after a 2–0 victory in the 2nd replay.

He has also represented Mohammedan at the 1988–89 and 1989–90 seasons of the Asian Club Championship.

== For the national team ==
In the national team Sabbir formed a partnership with the Abahani striker Sheikh Mohammad Aslam, and the two combined to produce many important goals for the national side. For example, a cross by Sabbir helped Aslam score a headed goal against Iran, at Dhaka, in a FIFA World Cup qualifier in early 1989. Bangladesh lost 2–1. The missed penalty by Sabbir in the first half proved decisive. The team was more successful in the President's Cup final later that year. There, Aslam scored, heading a Sabbir corner to give Bangladesh the lead against a South Korea side; and although the visitors equalized, Bangladesh prevailed in the penalty shootout.

Sabbir scored his last goal for the national team against Thailand on 5 May 1993, but Bangladesh lost 1–4. He played a total of twenty matches for the national team and appeared in his last match at the Al Maktoum Stadium in UAE, against Sri Lanka on 7 May 1993.

== In Calcutta league ==
In the summer of 1991, Sabbir was invited to play for Kolkata Mohammedan in the Calcutta Football League, and appeared with the side for a season.

== In domestic league ==
Before joining Mohammedan, Sabbir began his professional career at Sheikh Jamal Dhanmondi Club. He appeared with Dhanmondi from 1985 to 1987. At his peak, Sabbir was regarded as one of the country's finest winger. After his second stint with Dhaka Mohammedan, he signed with Rahmatganj MFS in 1997. Although his career was interrupted by injury, he left a lasting impression on the domestic game.

== Career statistics ==
=== International ===
National team	Year	Apps	Goals
Bangladesh
Bangladesh	1987	3	0
Bangladesh	1989	9	2
Bangladesh	1990	2	0
Bangladesh	1991	3	0
Bangladesh	1992	2	0
Bangladesh	1993	9	2
Bangladesh	Total	28	4

Scores and results list Bangladesh's goal tally first.

List of international goals scored by Rumman Bin Wali Sabbir
#	Date	Venue	Opponent	Score	Result	Competition
1.	21 October 1989	Jinnah Sports Stadium, Islamabad, Pakistan	Sri Lanka	2–0	3–0	1989 South Asian Games
2.	8 March 1989	Dhaka Stadium, Dhaka, Bangladesh	Thailand	2–0	3–1	1990 FIFA World Cup qualification
3.	5 May 1993	Al Maktoum Stadium, Dubai, UAE	Thailand	1–4	1–4	1994 FIFA World Cup qualification
4.	13 December 1993	Mirpur Stadium, Dhaka, Bangladesh	Myanmar	3–1	3–1	Friendly

== Post-playing career ==
In May 2021, Sabbir became a member of the technical committee for cricket and football of the Dhaka Mohammedan.

== Honours ==
Mohammedan SC

- Dhaka First Division/Premier Division League: 1987, 1988–89, 1993, 1996
- Federation Cup: 1987, 1989, 1995
- Independence Cup: 1991
- Ma-O-Moni Gold Cup: 1990
- DMFA Cup: 1993, 1995

Bangladesh

- South Asian Games Silver medal: 1989; Bronze medal: 1991
