= Song Ju-seok =

South Korean footballer

Song Ju-Seok 송주석
Personal information
- Full name: Song Ju-Seok
- Date of birth: February 26, 1967 (age 59)
- Place of birth: Gangneung, Gangwon, South Korea
- Height: 1.83 m (6 ft 0 in)
- Position: Forward

Youth career
- 1986–1989: Korea University

Senior career*
Years	Team	Apps	(Gls)
1990–1999	Hyundai Horang-i / Ulsan Hyundai Horang-i	197	(33)

International career^{‡}
1995	South Korea	1	(0)
- * Club domestic league appearances and goals as of 27 December 2007 ‡ National team caps and goals as of 27 December 2007

Song Ju-Seok (Korean: 송주석; born February 26, 1967) is a former South Korean footballer.

== Career ==
He played for only one club in the K-League, Ulsan Hyundai Horang-i. In K-League 1990, his first season, he was named K-League Rookie of the Year, beating his strong rivals including Kim Hyun-Seok and Ha Seok-Ju. He scored 3 goals and made 7 assists in K-League 1990.

== Career statistics ==
Appearances and goals by club, season and competition
Club	Season	League			KFA Cup		League Cup		Asia		Total	
Club	Season	Division	Apps	Goals	Apps	Goals	Apps	Goals	Apps	Goals	Apps	Goals
Ulsan Hyundai	1990	K-League	29	3	—		—		—		29	3
Ulsan Hyundai	1991	K-League	30	3	—		—		—		30	3
Ulsan Hyundai	1992	K-League	22	3	—		8	2	—		30	5
Ulsan Hyundai	1993	K-League	21	1	—		5	2	—		26	3
Ulsan Hyundai	1994	K-League	13	2	—		2	0	—		15	2
Ulsan Hyundai	1995	K-League	23	5	—		6	5	—		29	10
Ulsan Hyundai	1996	K-League	27	8	?	?	5	0	?	?		
Ulsan Hyundai	1997	K-League	16	6	?	?	12	4	?	?		
Ulsan Hyundai	1998	K-League	12	2	?	?	8	1	?	?		
Ulsan Hyundai	1999	K-League	4	0	?	?	5	0	—			
Career total			197	33			51	14				
