= Kwon Oh-son =

South Korean footballer (born 1959)

Personal information
- Date of birth: 3 February 1959 (age 67)
- Place of birth: South Korea
- Position: Defender

Team information
- Current team: Brunei (head coach)

Youth career
- University of Seoul

Senior career*
Years	Team	Apps	(Gls)
1980–1983	Seoul Metropolitan Government	?	(?)
1983	Kookmin Bank	1	(0)
1984–1987	Lucky-Goldstar Hwangso	40	(0)
1988	Hyundai Horang-i	3	(0)

International career
1979–1982	South Korea	11	(1)

Managerial career
- ?–2003: Seoul Metropolitan Government
- 2005: Brunei U21
- 2007: Brunei U17
- 2008: Brunei
- 2011–2013: Brunei U21
- 2012: Brunei
- 2013: Brunei U23
- 2014: Brunei U21
- 2015: Brunei U19
- 2016: Brunei
- 2018–2019: Brunei
- * Club domestic league appearances and goals

- Kwon Oh-son
- Hangul: 권오손
- Hanja: 權五孫
- RR: Gwon Oson
- MR: Kwŏn Oson

Kwon Oh-son (born February 3, 1959) is a Korean football defender who played for South Korea in the 1980 Asian Cup. He also played for Seoul Metropolitan Government, FC Seoul (then known as Lucky-Goldstar Hwangso) and Ulsan Hyundai (then known as Hyundai Horangi).

As a manager, he had managed Seoul Metropolitan Government, before moving to Brunei to coach various national teams since 2005. He was the head coach of the full national team of Brunei in 2016 as well as in 2018. His greatest success was the 2012 Hassanal Bolkiah Trophy with the Brunei under-21 team. His tenure with the Wasps ended in March 2019.

== International Record ==
Year	Apps	Goal
1980	2	0
1981	7	0
1982	2	1
Total	11	1

== Honours ==
=== Team ===
- Hassanal Bolkiah Trophy: 2012 (As head coach)

=== Individual ===
- Order of Setia Negara Brunei Fourth Class (PSB; 2012)
- Meritorious Service Medal (PJK; 2012)
