= Tommi Paavola =

Finnish former footballer (born 1965)

Personal information
- Date of birth: 9 December 1965 (age 60)
- Place of birth: Helsinki, Finland
- Height: 1.84 m (6 ft 0 in)
- Positions: Forward; midfielder

Youth career
- 1976–1982: Ponnistus

Senior career*
Years	Team	Apps	(Gls)
1982–1985	Ponnistus	?	(30)
1986–1987	TPS	44	(15)
1988	HJK	19	(2)
1989–1990	Hessen Kassel	22	(3)
1990–1991	Lokeren	11	(1)
1991	Haka	11	(3)
1991–1992	Mainz 05	9	(2)
1992–1993	Lokeren	14	(0)
1993	FinnPa	23	(13)
1994	Lorient	10	(0)
1994	FinnPa	17	(0)
1995	Ponnistus	25	(5)
1996	Ayr United	3	(2)
1996–1997	FinnPa	48	(6)
1998	PK-35	27	(6)
1999	Jokerit	28	(2)
2000	Tampere United	29	(4)
2001	KooTeePee	19	(13)
2002	Ponnistus	17	(4)
2004	KäPa	10	(2)
2005	PK-35	20	(2)

International career
1983	Finland U17	9	(1)
1986–1988	Finland U21	8	(0)
1986–1994	Finland	19	(1)

Managerial career
- 2003: Espoo
- 2004: KäPa
- 2005: PK-35 (assistant)
- 2006–2009: Honka II
- * Club domestic league appearances and goals

Tommi Paavola (born 9 December 1965) is a Finnish former football coach and a former professional footballer who played as a forward and midfielder. He was capped 19 times for the Finland national team. Besides in his native Finland, Paavola played in Germany, Belgium, France and Scotland. Paavola won one Finnish championship title with HJK Helsinki in 1988 and the Finnish Cup title with Jokerit in 1999. In total, he made 298 appearances and scored 62 goals in Finnish top-tiers Mestaruussarja and Veikkausliiga.

== Personal life ==
According to Finnish media, Paavola dated Finnish journalist and politician Maria Guzenina in 2004.

== Career statistics ==
Appearances and goals by national team and year
National team	Year	Apps	Goals
Finland	1989	6	0
Finland	1990	4	0
Finland	1991	3	0
Finland	1992	0	0
Finland	1993	2	1
Finland	1994	4	0
Total		19	1

Scores and results list Finland's goal tally first, score column indicates score after each Paavola goal.

List of international goals scored by Tommi Paavola
No.	Date	Venue	Opponent	Score	Result	Competition
1.	10 Nov 1993	Ramat Gan Stadium, Ramat Gan, Israel	Israel	2–0	3–1	1994 FIFA World Cup qualification

== Honours ==
HJK

- Mestaruussarja: 1988

Jokerit

- Finnish Cup: 1999
