= Bangladesh President's Gold Cup =

President's Gold Cup প্রেসিডেন্ট গোল্ডকাপ
- Organiser(s): Bangladesh Football Federation
- Founded: 1981; 45 years ago
- Abolished: 1993; 33 years ago
- Region: International

The Bangladesh President's Gold Cup (Bengali: বাংলাদেশ প্রেসিডেন্ট গোল্ডকাপ) was an international football tournament held annually from 1981 to 1993 in Dhaka, Bangladesh. It succeeded the Aga Khan Gold Cup, which was held in a similar format. According to historian Kausik Bandyopadhyay, the cup was intended to attract national or similarly high performance teams from abroad, but participants "fell far short of such expectations".

== Summary ==
Edition	Year	Champions	Result	Runners-up	Third place	Fourth place	Teams
1	1981	(South Korea) Seoul City Hall	2–0	Bangladesh Red	None	None	8
2	1982	(China) Beijing	4–0	Thailand Youth	Harimau Malaysia	(South Korea) Konkuk University	8
3	1983	(Iraq) Al-Shorta	2–0	Harimau Malaysia	None	None	10
4	1986	(Switzerland) Vevey Sports	3–2	(Finland) Turun Palloseura	(North Korea) Wolmido	Syria B	7
5	1987	Syria	4–1	(China) Guangdong	None	None	8
6	1989	Bangladesh Red	1–1 (4–3 pen.)	(South Korea) Korea University	None	None	7
7	1993	(Romania) Petrolul Ploiești	1–0	(Poland) Polonia Warszawa	(Russia) Krylya Sovetov	(South Korea) Housing Bank	8

== Awards ==
=== Most Valuable Player ===
Year	Player	Team
1982	(China) Yu Jinglian	(China) Beijing
1983	(Iraq) Tarek Salman	(Iraq) Al-Shorta
1986	(Switzerland) Patrick Gavillet	(Switzerland) Vevey Sports
1987	(Syria) Walid Abu Al-Sel (Bangladesh) Monir Hossain Manu	Syria; Bangladesh White
1989	(South Korea) Kim Young Sook	(South Korea) Korea University
1993	(Romania) Florin Simion (Romania) Valeriu Răchită	(Romania) Petrolul Ploiești

=== Top goalscorer ===
Year	Player	Team	Goals
1981	(South Korea) Park Young Gi	(South Korea) Seoul City Hall	6
1982	(South Korea) Yung Kook (Malaysia) Hasimuddin	(South Korea) Konkuk University; Harimau Malaysia	3
1983	(Iraq) Nasir Jaseem (Iraq) Karim Nafhai	(Iraq) Al-Shorta	4
1986	(Italy) Gabor Pavoni (Finland) Heikki Suhonen	(Switzerland) Vevey Sports (Finland) Turun Palloseura	5
1987	(China) Wu Qunli (Syria) Nizar Mahrous	(China) Guangdong; Syria	5
1989	(South Korea) Song Ju-seok	(South Korea) Korea University	3
1993	(South Korea) Choi Tae Ho (Romania) Florin Simion (Russia) Vladimir Filippov	(South Korea) Housing Bank (Romania) Petrolul Ploiești (Russia) Krylya Sovetov	3

== See also ==
- Bangladesh national football team
- Bangladesh national football B team
- Bangladesh Football Federation
- Aga Khan Gold Cup
