= 1980 AFC Youth Championship =

Tournament details
- Host country: Thailand
- Dates: 21 February – 1 March
- Teams: 5 (from 1 confederation)
- Venue: 1 (in 1 host city)

Final positions
- Champions: South Korea (5th title)

Tournament statistics
- Matches played: 10
- Goals scored: 24 (2.4 per match)
- Top scorer: (South Korea) Choi Soon-ho (4 goals)
- Best player: (South Korea) Choi Soon-ho

The 1980 AFC Youth Championship was held from 21 February to 1 March 1981 in Bangkok, Thailand. The tournament was won by for the fifth time by South Korea.

== Qualification ==
The finals will consist of five teams from the qualification phase. Qualification consisted of two groups with the top two of Group 1 and the top three of Group 2 qualifying for the final tournament.

=== Qualified teams ===
- Qatar (Qualification Group 1 winners)
- Bangladesh (Qualification Group 1 runners-up)
- South Korea (Qualification Group 2 winners)
- Japan (Qualification Group 2 runners-up)
- Thailand (Qualification Group 2 third place)

== Final tournament ==
Team	Pld	W	D	L	GF	GA	GD	Pts
South Korea	4	3	1	0	9	3	+6	7
Qatar	4	2	1	1	4	4	0	5
Japan	4	2	0	2	4	5	−1	4
Thailand	4	1	0	3	6	5	+1	2
Bangladesh	4	0	2	2	1	7	−6	2

21 February 1981

Thailand	5 – 0	Bangladesh

Bangkok
21 February 1981

Qatar	1 – 4	South Korea

Bangkok

23 February 1981

Thailand	0 – 2	Qatar

Bangkok
23 February 1981

South Korea	3 – 1	Japan

Bangkok

25 February 1981

Bangladesh	0 – 0	Qatar

Bangkok
25 February 1981

Thailand	1 – 2	Japan

Bangkok

27 February 1981

Japan	0 – 1	Qatar

Bangkok
27 February 1981

South Korea	1 – 1	Bangladesh

Bangkok

1 March 1981

Thailand	0 – 1	South Korea

Bangkok
1 March 1981

Japan	1 – 0	Bangladesh

Bangkok

== Winner ==
AFC Youth Championship 1980 winners

South Korea
Fifth title

== Qualification to World Youth Championship ==
The following teams qualified for the 1981 FIFA World Youth Championship.

- South Korea
- Qatar
