= 1987 Dhaka First Division Football League =

15th season of top-tier football league in Bangladesh

Dhaka First Division League
- Season: 1987
- Dates: May 13 — 26 October 1987
- Champions: Mohammedan (14th title)
- Relegated: Mirpur Chalantika; Wari
- Asian Club Championship: Mohammedan
- Matches: 121
- Goals: 232 (1.92 per match)
- Top goalscorer: 14; Sheikh Mohammad Aslam (Dhaka Abahani)

The 1987 Dhaka First Division League, also known as the Senior Division National Bank Football League for sponsorship reasons, was the 15th season of the top-tier football league in Bangladesh and the 38th overall season of the First Division following the partition of India. A total of 16 teams participated in the league, which began on 13 May. The round-robin stage ended on 10 September, with the initial championship play-off held on 9 September and replayed on 26 October 1987. The league champions Mohammedan qualified for the 1988–89 Asian Club Championship.

The two-point system was reinstated, under which teams received 2 points for a win, 1 point for a draw, and 0 points for a loss. Additionally, from this season onwards, the hat-trick rule was changed from requiring three consecutive goals to requiring three goals in a single game, in accordance with FIFA rules. League games were played over 80 minutes, with two 40-minute halves separated by a five-minute half-time interval.

== Venue ==
The Dhaka Stadium in Dhaka was the main venue for the league.

Dhaka	1987 Dhaka First Division Football League is located in Bangladesh
Dhaka Stadium	1987 Dhaka First Division Football League is located in Bangladesh
Capacity: 36,000	1987 Dhaka First Division Football League is located in Bangladesh

== League table ==
Pos	Team	Pld	W	D	L	GF	GA	GD	Pts	Qualification or relegation
1	Dhaka Abahani	15	13	1	1	40	10	+30	27	Qualification for the Championship playoff
2	Mohammedan	15	12	3	0	36	9	+27	27	Qualification for the Championship playoff
3	Muktijoddha	15	8	5	2	18	12	+6	21	
4	Brothers Union	15	6	8	1	16	9	+7	20	
5	Adamjee	15	6	7	2	13	7	+6	19	
6	BRTC	15	4	7	4	12	15	−3	15	
7	Farashganj	15	3	8	4	13	17	−4	14	
8	Arambagh	15	5	4	6	16	22	−6	14	
9	Dhanmondi	15	4	4	7	10	16	−6	12	
10	Rahmatganj	15	3	6	6	12	17	−5	12	
11	Sadharan Bima	15	3	6	6	8	14	−6	12	
12	Dhaka Wanderers	15	3	6	6	8	16	−8	12	
13	Victoria	15	2	6	7	7	15	−8	10	
14	PWD	15	1	8	6	7	17	−10	10	
15	Mirpur Chalantika (R)	15	1	6	8	8	21	−13	8	Relegation to the 1988–89 Dhaka Second Division League
16	Wari (R)	15	2	3	10	6	13	−7	7	Relegation to the 1988–89 Dhaka Second Division League

Source: RSSSF
Rules for classification: 1) Points; 2) Goal difference; 3) Goals scored;
(R) Relegated

== Championship play-off ==
Despite Dhaka Abahani's superior goal difference, the BFF organised a championship play-off between Abahani and Mohammedan on 9 September to determine the league winner. The play-off was required after Mohammedan defeated Abahani 3–2 in the final league match on 6 September, leaving both teams level on points. Abahani's Samir Shaker was unavailable for the play-off after receiving a suspension for spitting at the fourth official during the match, while Mohammedan's Emeka Ezeugo was also ruled out after accumulating three yellow cards during the league campaign.

9 September 1987
16:15 BST

Dhaka Abahani	0–0	Mohammedan
	Report

Dhaka Stadium
Attendance: 50,000
Referee: Ansarul Islam Montu (Bangladesh)

Abahani	Mohammedan

GK	(Bangladesh) Mohamed Mohsin	Booked
RB	(Bangladesh) Monem Munna	Booked
LB	(Bangladesh) Imtiaz Sultan Johnny
CB	(Sri Lanka) Pakir Ali
CB	(Bangladesh) Abu Yusuf
MF	(Bangladesh) Mostafa Kamal	Sent off (straight red)
MF	(Bangladesh) Satyajit Das Rupu
MF	(Bangladesh) Ashish Bhadra		Substituted off
LW	(Iraq) Karim Allawi
RW	(Sri Lanka) Ratnayaka Premalal
CF	(Bangladesh) Sheikh Mohammad Aslam (c)
Substitutions:
MF	(Bangladesh) Fakrul Kamal		Substituted on
Head coach:
(Bangladesh) Kazi Salahuddin

GK	(Bangladesh) Sayeed Hassan Kanan
RB	(Bangladesh) Ahsanullah Montu	Booked
LB	(Bangladesh) Abul Hossain	Sent off (straight red)
CB	(Bangladesh) Kaiser Hamid	Booked
CB	(Bangladesh) Ranjit Saha (c)
MF	(Bangladesh) Khurshid Alam Babul
MF	(Iran) Reza Naalchegar		Substituted off
MF	(Bangladesh) Elias Hossain
RW	(Bangladesh) Samrat Hossain Emily		Substituted off
CF	(Iran) Morteza Yekkeh
LW	(Iran) Gholamreza Borhanzadeh
Substitutions:
MF	(Bangladesh) Rumman Bin Wali Sabbir		Substituted on
MF	(Bangladesh) Kazi Kamal		Substituted on
Manager:
(Iran) Nasser Hejazi

Replay

The initial championship play-off, held on 9 September, ended in controversy after both clubs refused to play extra time and declared themselves joint champions. The BFF and the league committee (DMFLC) rejected the decision, annulled the match, and ordered a replay to be held behind closed doors due to concerns over crowd violence. The captains of both teams, Ranjit Saha of Mohammedan and Sheikh Mohammad Aslam of Dhaka Abahani, were suspended for one year (later reduced), while Abahani's Mohammad Mohsin and Mostafa Kamal and Mohammedan's Abul Hossain and Elias Hossain each received three-month suspensions.

The replay was delayed for more than a month due to the disciplinary actions. Abahani initially refused to participate, while several foreign players from both clubs departed after believing that the league would not resume. Mohammedan later accepted the decision to replay the match, despite objections to the suspensions, while Abahani eventually agreed to take part. The replay was held on 26 October behind closed doors at the Ershad Army Stadium due to concerns over potential fan altercations and violence, which had been a recurring issue during matches between the two clubs in the Dhaka derby.

26 October 1987
15:00 BST

Dhaka Abahani	0–2	Mohammedan
	Report	Emily 19'; Emeka 50'

Ershad Army Stadium
Attendance: 0
Referee: Ansarul Islam Montu (Bangladesh)

Abahani	Mohammedan

GK	(Bangladesh) Mahmud Hossain Curzon
RB	(Bangladesh) Monem Munna
LB	(Bangladesh) Imtiaz Sultan Johnny
CB	(Sri Lanka) Pakir Ali (c)
CB	(Bangladesh) Abu Yusuf
MF	(Bangladesh) Satyajit Das Rupu
MF	(Bangladesh) Ashish Bhadra
MF	(Bangladesh) Nabib		Substituted on
LF	(Bangladesh) Fakrul Kamal	Booked
RF	(Sri Lanka) Ratnayaka Premalal
CF	(Bangladesh) Mobinul Islam Khasru		Substituted on
Substitutions:
MF	(Bangladesh) Mossey		Substituted on
MF	(Bangladesh) Ashrafuddin Chunnu		Substituted on
Head coach:
(Bangladesh) Kazi Salahuddin

GK	(Bangladesh) Sayeed Hassan Kanan
RB	(Bangladesh) Shafiqul Islam Manik
LB	(Bangladesh) Kazi Kamal
CB	(Bangladesh) Kaiser Hamid (c)
CB	(Bangladesh) Ahsanullah Montu
MF	(Bangladesh) Khurshid Alam Babul
MF	(Nigeria) Emeka Ezeugo	Booked
MF	(Bangladesh) Badal Roy		Substituted on
RW	(Bangladesh) Rumman Bin Wali Sabbir
CF	(Bangladesh) Samrat Hossain Emily
LW	(Bangladesh) Jasimuddin Ahmed Joshi		Substituted on
Substitutions:
MF	(Bangladesh) Gyasuddin Ahmed		Substituted on
MF	(Bangladesh) Monir Hossain Manu		Substituted on
Manager:
(Iran) Nasser Hejazi

=== Final table ===
Pos	Team	Qualification
1	Mohammedan (C)	Qualification for the 1988–89 Asian Club Championship
2	Dhaka Abahani	

Source: RSSSF
(C) Champions

== Season statistics ==
=== Top goalscorers ===
Rank	Player	Club	Goals
1	(Bangladesh) Sheikh Mohammad Aslam	Dhaka Abahani	14
2	(Iraq) Karim Allawi	Dhaka Abahani	11
3	(Nigeria) Emeka Ezeugo	Mohammedan	9
4	(Sri Lanka) Ratnayaka Premalal	Dhaka Abahani	8
5	(Bangladesh) Mahmudul Haque Liton	Brothers Union	5
5	(Bangladesh) Arif Abdul Khalek	Muktijoddha	5

=== Hat-tricks ===
Player	For	Against	Result	Date
(Bangladesh) Sheikh Mohammad Aslam	Dhaka Abahani	PWD	5–2	29 June 1987

== See also ==
- 1987 Federation Cup
