= 1987 Federation Cup (Bangladesh) =

8th season of the Bangladesh Federation Cup

Tournament details
- Host country: Bangladesh
- Dates: 26 April – 9 May 1987
- Teams: 8
- Venue: 1 (in 1 host city)

Final positions
- Champions: Mohammedan (5th title)
- Runners-up: Dhaka Wanderers

Tournament statistics
- Matches played: 15
- Goals scored: 29 (1.93 per match)
- Top scorer(s): Rumman Bin Wali Sabbir (Mohammedan); Rizvi Karim Rumi (BRTC) (4 goals)

The 1987 Federation Cup was the 8th edition of the tournament, the main domestic annual club football competition in Bangladesh organized by Bangladesh Football Federation (BFF). Eight clubs participated in the tournament, which was played from 16 April to 9 May 1987. In contrast to First Division matches, Federation Cup matches lasted 90 minutes, consisting of two 45-minute halves.

== Venue ==
The Dhaka Stadium in Dhaka was the sole venue for the tournament.

Dhaka	1987 Federation Cup (Bangladesh) is located in Bangladesh
Dhaka Stadium	1987 Federation Cup (Bangladesh) is located in Bangladesh
Capacity: 55,000	1987 Federation Cup (Bangladesh) is located in Bangladesh

== Qualification round ==
First round

16 April 1987
18:30 (BST)

Dhaka Wanderers	2–1 (a.e.t.)	Victoria
Mostafizur Rahman Mostak 56'; Shahabuddin 99'		Belal

Dhaka Stadium, Dhaka
Referee: Abdul Khalek (Bangladesh)
17 April 1987
18:30 (BST)

Rahamtagnj	Abandoned (Note: Game abandoned after 27 minutes due to kalboisakhi rain.)	PWD

Dhaka Stadium, Dhaka
18 April 1987
18:30 (BST)

Muktijoddha	1–1 (a.e.t.)	Mirpur Chalantika
Arif Abdul Khalek 72'		Jubayer 47'
Penalties
Nurul Islam (penalty scored); Shipar (penalty missed); Anwar (penalty missed); Zia Ul Huq Babu (penalty scored); Ahmed Ali (penalty missed); Nazmul Islam Tuhin (penalty scored)	3–0	Dilip Das (penalty scored); Sattar (penalty scored); Shariful (penalty missed); Shamsu (penalty missed); Bacchu (penalty missed); Manju (penalty missed)

Dhaka Stadium, Dhaka
Referee: Abdur Rashid (Bangladesh)
19 April 1987
18:30 (BST)

Arambagh	2–0	East Bengal
Pappu 62' (pen.); Manik 78'

Dhaka Stadium, Dhaka
Referee: Rafiqul Islam (Bangladesh)
20 April 1987
18:30 (BST)

PWD	0–0 (a.e.t.)	Rahamtagnj
Penalties
Yamin (penalty scored); Saidul (penalty scored); Sirjit (penalty scored)	3–0	A.M. Abdullah Saik (penalty missed); Lalu (penalty missed); Shofi (penalty missed)

Dhaka Stadium, Dhaka
21 April 1987
18:30 (BST)

Sadharan Bima	1–0	Adamjee
Shahid 25'

Dhaka Stadium, Dhaka
Referee: Abdur Rashid (Bangladesh)
21 April 1987

Farashganj	Walkover 3–0	Jagrata Sangha

Dhaka Stadium, Dhaka

Second round

22 April 1987
16:00 (BST)

Arambagh	1–1	PWD
Moin Babu		Niamat
Penalties
Mukul (penalty scored); Ripon (penalty scored); Moin (penalty scored); Mostakim (penalty scored); Akram (penalty scored); Moin Babu (penalty scored); Noyna (penalty scored); Dablu (penalty scored)	8–7	Yeamin (penalty scored); Saidul (penalty scored); Niamat (penalty scored); Badal (penalty scored); Siddique (penalty scored); Sawpan (penalty scored); Akbor (penalty scored); ? (penalty missed)

Dhaka Stadium, Dhaka
22 April 1987
18:30 (BST)

Dhaka Wanderers	2–0	Wari
Niranjan 20'; Rubel 38'

Dhaka Stadium, Dhaka
Referee: Zahirul Haque (Bangladesh)
23 April 1987
16:00 (BST)

Dhanmondi	2–0	Farashganj
Mithu 69'; Raj 87'

Dhaka Stadium, Dhaka
Referee: Abdul Khalek (Bangladesh)
23 April 1987
18:30 (BST)

Sadharan Bima	1–0 (a.e.t.)	Muktijoddha
Titu 115'

Dhaka Stadium, Dhaka
Referee: Abdul Aziz (Bangladesh)

== Group stage ==
=== Group A ===
Pos	Team	Pld	W	D	L	GF	GA	GD	Pts	Qualification
1	BRTC	3	2	1	0	4	2	+2	5	Advance to the semi-finals
2	Dhaka Wanderers	3	1	2	0	2	0	+2	4	Advance to the semi-finals
3	Dhaka Abahani	3	1	1	1	4	2	+2	3	
4	Sadharan Bima	3	0	0	3	1	7	−6	0	

Source: RSSSF
26 April 1987
14:30 (BST)

Dhaka Wanderers	0–0	Sadharan Bima

Dhaka Stadium, Dhaka
Referee: Ansarul Islam Montu (Bangladesh)
26 April 1987
18:00 (BST)

Dhaka Abahani	3–0	Sadharan Bima
Aslam 47', 64'; Mobinul Islam Khasru 72'

Dhaka Stadium, Dhaka
Referee: Rafiqul Islam (Bangladesh)
28 April 1987
16:30 (BST)

BRTC	2–1	Sadharan Bima
Rumi 80', 87'		Titu 41'

Dhaka Stadium, Dhaka
Referee: Rafiqul Islam (Bangladesh)
29 April 1987
16:30 (BST)

Dhaka Abahani	0–0	Dhaka Wanderers

Dhaka Stadium, Dhaka
Referee: Abdul Aziz (Bangladesh)
3 May 1987
14:15 (BST)

Dhaka Wanderers	2–0	Sadharan Bima
Omar 19', 50'

Dhaka Stadium, Dhaka
Referee: Rafiqul Islam (Bangladesh)
3 May 1987
16:00 (BST)

Dhaka Abahani	1–2	BRTC
Kamal		Rumi 36'; Manju 63'

Dhaka Stadium, Dhaka
Referee: Zahirul Haque (Bangladesh)

=== Group B ===
Pos	Team	Pld	W	D	L	GF	GA	GD	Pts	Qualification
1	Brothers Union	3	3	0	0	6	0	+6	6	Advance to the semi-finals
2	Moammedan	3	1	1	1	3	2	+1	3	Advance to the semi-finals
3	Arambagh	3	1	0	2	2	4	−2	2	
4	Dhanmondi	3	0	1	2	1	6	−5	1	

Source: RSSSF
27 April 1987
16:30 (BST)

Mohammedan	1–1	Dhanmondi
Emily 1'		Mahbub 20'

Dhaka Stadium, Dhaka
Referee: Zahirul Haque (Bangladesh)
27 April 1987
18:15 (BST)

Brothers Union	2–0	Arambagh
Badal 57'; Liton

Dhaka Stadium, Dhaka
Referee: Ansarul Islam Montu (Bangladesh)
30 April 1987
14:45 (BST)

Brothers Union	Abandoned (Note: Game abandoned after 78 minutes due to excessive rain.)	Dhanmondi
Prashanta Das 4'		Raj 14'

Dhaka Stadium, Dhaka
2 May 1987
14:15 (BST)

Brothers Union	3–0	Dhanmondi
Shimul 5', 77'; Liton 29'

Dhaka Stadium, Dhaka
Referee: Abdur Rashid (Bangladesh)
2 May 1987
16:00 (BST)

Mohammedan	2–0	Arambagh
Sabbir 34', 51'

Dhaka Stadium, Dhaka
Referee: Abdul Khalek (Bangladesh)
4 May 1987
14:15 (BST)

Arambagh	2–0	Dhanmondi
Lokhi 25'; Moin Babu 65'

Dhaka Stadium, Dhaka
Referee: Ataul Haque (Bangladesh)
4 May 1987
16:00 (BST)

Mohammedan	0–1	Brothers Union
		Badal 41'

Dhaka Stadium, Dhaka
Referee: Ansarul Islam Montu (Bangladesh)

== Knockout stage ==
=== Semi-finals ===
6 May 1987
15:15 (BST)

Mohammedan	3–1	BRTC
Manu 1'; Sabbir 3', 69'		Rumi 40'

Dhaka Stadium, Dhaka
Referee: Abdur Rashid (Bangladesh)
7 May 1987
15:15 (BST)

Brothers Union	0–1	Dhaka Wanderers
		Omar 89'

Dhaka Stadium, Dhaka
Referee: Ansarul Islam Montu (Bangladesh)

=== Final ===
9 May 1987
15:15 (BST)

Mohammedan	1–0	Dhaka Wanderers
Emily 14'

Dhaka Stadium, Dhaka
Referee: Ansarul Islam Montu (Bangladesh)

Mohammedan	Dhaka Wanderers

GK	Sayeed Hassan Kanan
DF	Shafiqul Islam Manik
DF	Kazi Kamal
DF	Kaiser Hamid
DF	Ranjit Saha (c)
MF	Khurshid Alam Babul
MF	Elias Hossain
MF	Badal Roy
FW	Monir Hossain Manu	Substituted off
FW	Samrat Hossain Emily	Substituted off
FW	Rumman Bin Wali Sabbir
Substitutions:
FW	Jasimuddin Ahmed Joshi	Substituted on
DF	Abul Hossain	Substituted on
Head coach:
(Bangladesh) Pratap Shankar Hazra

GK	Aslam
DF	Niranjan
DF	Tapan
DF	S.M. Salahuddin (c)
DF	Mahbub
MF	Fuad
MF	Sheikh Mohammed Sohel
MF	Shahabuddin	Substituted off
FW	Prince
FW	Mostafizur Rahman Mostak
FW	Akhter	Substituted off
Substitutions:
MF	Rubel	Substituted on
FW	Mohammed Mahbub Omar	Substituted on
Manager:
(Bangladesh) Abdul Hakim

== See also ==
- 1987 Dhaka First Division Football League
