= Mohamed Mohsin (footballer, born 1965) =

Bangladeshi footballer

Md Moshin
Personal information
- Full name: Mohamed Mohsin
- Date of birth: 1 August 1965 (age 61)
- Place of birth: Manikganj, East Pakistan (present-day Bangladesh)
- Height: 1.71 m (5 ft 7 1/2 in)
- Position: Goalkeeper

Senior career*
Years	Team	Apps	(Gls)
1978	Railway Blues		
1979–1981	Dhaka Abahani		
1982–1986	Mohammedan SC		
1987–1993	Dhaka Abahani		
1994–1995	Muktijoddha Sangsad		

International career
1984	Bangladesh U19		
1982–1994	Bangladesh		
Medal record
Representing Bangladesh
South Asian Games
Silver medal – second place	1985
Bronze medal – third place	1991
- * Club domestic league appearances and goals

Mohamed Mohsin (Bengali: মোহাম্মদ মহসিন; born 1 August 1965) is a retired Bangladeshi footballer who played as a goalkeeper. He is considered to be one of the best goalkeepers to have played for the Bangladesh national team. He has captained his country and also clubs like Mohammedan SC, Abahani Limited Dhaka and Muktijoddha Sangsad.

== Club career ==
While studying in Motijheel Ideal High School, Mohsin got a chance to practice with Dhaka Second Division club Railway Blues at the Shahjahanpur ground in his neighbourhood. He caught the eye of Abahani Krira Chakra captain Ashrafuddin Ahmed Chunnu during the Sher-e-Bangla Cup, and joined the First Division club in 1979. As he was the third choice keeper at Abahani, he moved to their rivals Mohammedan SC in 1982, for more game time. Mohsin replaced Lal Mohammed as the club's first choice keeper, after the veteran abruptly left football. He made a name for himself that year during the Dhaka Derby when he saved a penalty kick from Kazi Salahuddin. He ended his career in 1995 while playing for Muktijoddha Sangsad KC, after suffering from a long-term knee injury.

== International career ==
Mohsin made his international debut against China during the 1982 Asian Games, replacing an out of favour Abdul Motaleb in the starting XI. During the same tournament he made crucial saves as Bangladesh defeated Malaysia 2–1, to earn their first ever victory at the Asian Games. In the 1983 Merdeka Cup he saved a penalty kick against Algeria, in addition to that, he saved penalties against both Iran and UAE during his decade-long career with Bangladesh. He was the first choice keeper for Bangladesh during the 1986 FIFA World Cup qualifiers and the 1985 South Asian Games.

At youth level he represented the Bangladesh U19 at the qualifiers of the 1985 AFC Youth Championship. In 1987, Mohsin was one of the six players banned from international football by the Bangladesh Football Federation, after a high voltage Dhaka Derby league play-off match. He was replaced by Sayeed Hassan Kanan during both the 1987 South Asian Games and 1988 AFC Asian Cup qualifiers. He later captained the senior team to a bronze medal at the 1991 South Asian Games. He last played international football during the 1994 Qatar Independence Cup, where Muktijoddha Sangsad KC played as Bangladesh.

== Personal life ==
In 1995, Mohsin suffered a serious knee injury and had to travel to Canada to get better treatment, however, the injury did not get better and in 1997, he moved abroad permanently with his family. In 2023, a few years after his return to Bangladesh, his younger brother Kohinoor Islam, announced that Mohsin was not able to get treatment for his Dementia due to financial issues. It was also reported that he suffered from mental health problems after losing most of his assets and fortune, following his divorce. On 6 June 2023, Bangladesh Cricket Board announced that they would help fund Mohsin's treatment and also resolve his property crisis. Following this, Kazi Salahuddin, a former teammate and the president of the Bangladesh Football Federation, stated that he would provide TK 1 lakh to the ailing goalkeeper and would also pay for his treatment costs. On 7 June 2023, Mohsin was admitted to the Bangabandhu Sheikh Mujib Medical University to get treatment for his illness.

On 7 August 2024, who was suffering from dementia, went missing after leaving his home in Maghbazar, Dhaka.

== Honours ==
Abahani Limited Dhaka

- Dhaka First Division League: 1981, 1989–90, 1992
- BTC Club Cup: 1991
- Azmiri Begum Gold Cup: 1990
- Independence Cup: 1990
- Federation Cup: 1988
- Sait Nagjee Trophy: 1989

Mohammedan SC

- Dhaka First Division League: 1982, 1986
- DMFA Cup: 1984*
- Federation Cup: 1982*, 1983
- Ashis-Jabbar Shield Tournament (India): 1982

Muktijoddha SKC

- Federation Cup: 1994

Bangladesh

- South Asian Games Silver medal: 1985; Bronze medal: 1991

=== Awards and accolades ===
- 2020 − National Sports Award.
- 1991 − Sports Writers Association's Best Footballer Award
- 1988 − Federation Cup Most Valuable Player Award.
