= Badal Das =

Bangladeshi footballer

- Badal in 1985

Personal information
- Full name: Badal Das
- Date of birth: c. 1964
- Place of birth: Chandpur, East Pakistan (present-day Bangladesh)
- Date of death: 1 September 2012 (aged 47)
- Place of death: Dhaka, Bangladesh
- Position: Center forward

Senior career*
| Years | Team | Apps | (Gls) |
| 1983 | Little Friends | | |
| 1984–1985 | Farashganj SC | | (8) |
| 1986 | Dhaka Wanderers | | (7) |
| 1987–1991 | Brothers Union | | |
| 1991–1992 | Farashganj SC | | |
| 1993–1997 | Bangladesh Boys | | |

International career
| 1988 | Bangladesh U19 | 1 | (0) |
| 1987–1991 | Bangladesh | 7 | (2) |

Managerial career
- 2000–2005: Little Friends
- * Club domestic league appearances and goals

Badal Das (c. 1964 – 1 September 2012) was a Bangladeshi football player and coach. He represented the Bangladesh national team between 1987 and 1991, scoring 2 goals in 7 official games.

== Club career ==
A product of the Pioneer Football League, Badal played for Little Friends Club in the Dhaka Third Division League in 1983. The following year, he joined Farashganj SC in the First Division, the top-tier at the time. In his two seasons at the club Badal scored 5 and 3 league goals respectively. In 1986, he joined Dhaka Wanderers Club, scoring 7 goals in his lone year with them, before moving to Brothers Union. His first season with the Oranges saw him only score twice in the league, however, after the appointment of coach Kazi Salahuddin, Badal's performances improved. During the 1988–89 league opening match against Dhanmondi Club he strcuk a hat-trick. In 1993, Badal captained Bangladesh Boys Club to promotion from the Dhaka First Division League.

== International career ==
On 8 February 1987, Badal made his debut for the Bangladesh national team against Thailand in the President's Gold Cup held in Dhaka. The team played under the name Bangladesh White and mainly consisted of players from Mohammedan SC, although Badal was playing for Brothers Union at the time. During the match while his team were down by two goals he scored in the 83rd minute from a Monir Hossain Manu cross initiating Bangladesh's comeback. The game ended in a 2–2 draw after Samrat Hossain Emily equalised in the 85th minute. Badal was integral part of the team throughout the tournament scoring three goals as his team reached the semi-finals, only to be knocked out in penalties by Chinese club Guangdong. Badal's performances in his debut tournament earned him a place in coach Abdur Rahim's team for the 1987 South Asian Games. With the Bangladesh U19 team he played one out of the two 1988 AFC Youth Championship qualifying matches against North Korea U19, coming on as a substitute in the first leag which ended 0–0. Bangladesh eventually failed to qualify for the main round after losing the second leg 1–5.

List of international goals scored by Badal Das
| No. | Date | Venue | Opponent | Score | Result | Competition |
|---|---|---|---|---|---|---|
| 1 | 8 February 1987 | Dhaka Stadium, Dhaka, Bangladesh | Thailand | 1–2 | 2–2 | President's Gold Cup |
| – | 12 February 1987 | Dhaka Stadium, Dhaka, Bangladesh | (India) East Bengal | 1–0 | 2–0 | President's Gold Cup |
| – | 15 February 1987 | Dhaka Stadium, Dhaka, Bangladesh | (China) Guangdong | 1–1 | 1(3)–1(4) | President's Gold Cup |
| 2 | 22 November 1987 | Eden Gardens, Kolkata, India | Bhutan | 2–0 | 3–0 | 1987 South Asian Games |

== Death ==
On 1 September 2012, Badal died while at a local hospital in Dhaka, Bangladesh after suffering a Cardiac arrest.

== Honours ==
=== Manager ===
Little Friends Club

- Dhaka Third Division League: 2003

== Bibliography ==
- Alam, Masud (2017). ফুটবলের গল্প ফুটবলারদের গল্প (transl. The story of football the story of footballers) (in Bengali). Bishhoshahitto Bhobon. ISBN 9789849134688.
