= Abdul Motaleb =

Abdul Motaleb may refer to:

- Abdul Motaleb (politician)
- Abdul Motaleb (footballer)
