= Arif Hossain Moon =

Bangladeshi footballer (born 1968)

Personal information
- Full name: Arif Hossain Moon
- Date of birth: 6 January 1968 (age 58)
- Place of birth: Rangpur, East Pakistan (present-day Bangladesh)
- Height: 1.80 m (5 ft 11 in)
- Position: Centre back

Senior career*
Years	Team	Apps	(Gls)
1986–1989	Adamjee SCC		
1989–1993	Brothers Union		
1994–1998	Muktijoddha Sangsad		

International career
1991	Bangladesh U23		
1989–1995	Bangladesh		
Medal record
Representing Bangladesh
South Asian Games
Silver medal – second place	1995
- * Club domestic league appearances and goals

Arif Hossain Moon (Bengali: আরিফ হোসেন মুন; born 6 January 1968) is a retired Bangladeshi footballer who played as a centre back. Moon spent most of his club career with Brothers Union and also captained them along with the Bangladesh national team.

== Early life ==
Moon was born on 6 January 1968 in Chikonmati, Domar Upazila of Nilphamari (then Rangpur), Bangladesh and spent his childhood there. His father Mohammad Anwar Hussain was a renowned lawyer and politician. His father was also the president of Nilphamari district branch of Bangladesh Awami League.

== Club career ==
In 1986, Moon started his career with Adamjee Jute Mills in the Dhaka Second Division League. In 1987, Adamjee entered the top-tier following their Second Division triumph and Moon was able to make his top-tier debut that season. Moon's next destination was Brothers Union, joining the club in 1989. In 1991, the young Brothers team made history by defeating Mohammedan SC in the final of the Federation Cup. He captained the club captain during the 1991–92 First Division.

In 1994, with the country's three well supported clubs– Abahani, Mohammedan and Brothers Union agreeing upon reducing player salaries, Moon along with many other national team players joined Muktijoddha Sangsad KC, which was at the time directed by politician and ex-Bangladesh Army major, Manzur Quader. During his stay at the club, he won both the Premier Division and Federation Cup titles.

== International career ==
In 1989, Moon made featured for the Bangladesh Green national team during the President's Gold Cup held on home soil. Eventually, he went onto represent the senior national team during both the 1994 FIFA World Cup qualifiers and 1995 South Asian Gold Cup.

During the 1993 South Asian Games, Moon was surprisingly named the Bangladesh national team captain, even with the presence of experienced players Monem Munna, Kaiser Hamid and Rizvi Karim Rumi. The decision made by Swiss coach Oldrich Svab was heavily criticized after Bangladesh crashed out of the competition without a single victory.

== Post-retirement ==
In 2012, almost a decade after ending his playing career, he was elected as a member of the executive council of Bangladesh Football Federation (BFF). In 2018, he played a major role in the development of the Nilphamari District Stadium (now Sheikh Kamal Stadium) at a cost of Tk 16 crore funded by the Asian Football Confederation. Like his father, Moon is involved in politics with Bangladesh Awami League. He served as the joint general secretary of Awami League Nilphamari district branch. After again being elected to the BFF executive committee in 2020, Moon resigned on 6 March 2023, stating that he could not continue for personal reasons.

== Honours ==
Adamjee SCC

- Dhaka Second Division League: 1986

Brothers Union

- Federation Cup: 1991

Muktijoddha Sangsad KC

- Federation Cup: 1994
- Dhaka Premier Division League: 1997–98

Bangladesh

- South Asian Games Silver medal: 1995
