= Mahfuzul Mamun Babu =

Bangladeshi association footballer

Mamun Babu
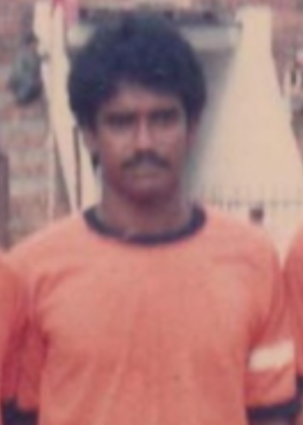
- Mamun Babu at the 1987 ANFA Cup as captain of Brothers Union

Personal information
- Full name: Mahfuzul Mamun Babu
- Date of birth: 7 January 1968 (age 58)
- Place of birth: Dacca, East Pakistan (present-day Dhaka, Bangladesh)
- Position: Left winger

Youth career
- 1980–1981: Gendaria Famous Club

Senior career*
Years	Team	Apps	(Gls)
1982–1983	East End Club		
1984–1990	Brothers Union		
1991–1992	Victoria SC		
1993–1994	East End Club		

International career
1984	Bangladesh U19		
1985–1988	Bangladesh		
Medal record
Representing Bangladesh
South Asian Games
Gold medal – first place	1985
- * Club domestic league appearances and goals

Mahfuzul Mamun Babu (Bengali: মাহফুজুল মামুন বাবু; born 7 January 1968) is a retired Bangladeshi football player who played as a left-winger. He represented the Bangladesh national team from 1985 to 1988.

== Club career ==
Mamun Babu began his career with his neighborhood club, Gendaria Famous, in the Pioneer Football League. In 1982, he debuted in the First Division with East End Club. In 1984, he moved to Brothers Union, where he spent the next eight years of his career. In 1985, he was part of the Brothers Union team that finished as league runners-up and scored in the decisive game against Dhaka Abahani, alongside Mahmudul Haque Liton, in a match his team lost 2–3.

== International career ==
In 1984, Mamun Babu represented the Bangladesh U19 team at the 1985 AFC Youth Championship qualification held in Dhaka, Bangladesh. He made his senior international debut on 21 December 1985 against Pakistan in the 1985 South Asian Games in Dhaka, scoring a brace in a 2–1 victory. In the following match against Maldives he scored in a 8–0 victory. The Bangladesh team eventually lost the gold medal match on penalties to India. The following year, Mamun Babu was part of the national team at the 1986 Asian Games held in Seoul, South Korea. However, he did not appear in a single match during the tournament. His final appearances for the national team came during the 1988 AFC Asian Cup qualifiers held in Abu Dhabi, UAE.

== Personal life ==
In March 2024, he was one of the eleven sportspersons selected to potentially receive the National Sports Awards.

== Career statistics ==
=== International goals ===
Scores and results list Bangladesh's goal tally first.

#	Date	Venue	Opponent	Score	Result	Competition
1.	21 December 1985	Dhaka Stadium, Dhaka, Bangladesh	Pakistan	1–1	2–1	1985 South Asian Games
2.	21 December 1985	Dhaka Stadium, Dhaka, Bangladesh	Pakistan	2–1	2–1	1985 South Asian Games
3.	23 December 1985	Dhaka Stadium, Dhaka, Bangladesh	Maldives	5–0	8–0	1985 South Asian Games
