= 1987 Bangladesh President's Gold Cup =

Tournament details
- Host country: Bangladesh
- Dates: 7–18 February 1987
- Teams: 8 (from 2 confederations)
- Venue: Dhaka Stadium

Final positions
- Champions: Syria (1st title)
- Runners-up: (China) Guangdong

Tournament statistics
- Matches played: 16
- Goals scored: 53 (3.31 per match)
- Top scorer(s): (China) Wu Qunli (Syria) Nizar Mahrous (5 goals)
- Best player(s): (Syria) Walid Abu Al-Sel (Bangladesh) Monir Hossain Manu
- Best goalkeeper: (India) Bhaskar Ganguly

The 1987 Bangladesh President's Gold Cup was the fifth edition of the Bangladesh President's Gold Cup. The event was held at the Dhaka Stadium in Dhaka, Bangladesh.

== Venues ==
Dhaka	1987 Bangladesh President's Gold Cup is located in Bangladesh
Dhaka Stadium	1987 Bangladesh President's Gold Cup is located in Bangladesh
Capacity: 36,000	1987 Bangladesh President's Gold Cup is located in Bangladesh

== Group stage ==
=== Group A ===
Pos	Team	Pld	W	D	L	GF	GA	GD	Pts	Qualification
1	(China) Guangdong	3	2	0	1	8	4	+4	4	Advance to the semi-finals
2	Syria	3	2	0	1	7	4	+3	4	Advance to the semi-finals
3	Bangladesh Blue	3	1	1	1	2	4	−2	3	
4	(India) Mohammedan	3	0	1	2	1	6	−5	1	

Source: RSSSF
7 February 1987

Bangladesh Blue	1–0	Syria
Kamal 67'	Report

Dhaka Stadium, Dhaka
Referee: Abdur Rashid (Bangladesh)

9 February 1987

Guangdong (China)	3–4	Syria
Wu Qunli 71', 76'; Huang Debao 74'	Report	Walid 5'; Mahrous 24'; Faisal Ahmad 69'; Abdul Kader 80'

Dhaka Stadium, Dhaka

9 February 1987

Bangladesh Blue	1–1	(India) Mohammedan
Kamal 43'	Report	Emeka 58'

Dhaka Stadium, Dhaka
Referee: Younus Rana (Pakistan)

NB Interrupted for 10 minutes during the second-half due to fighting.

11 February 1987

Guangdong (China)	3–0	Bangladesh Blue
Wu Qunli 63', 79'; Chen Haixian 64'	Report

Dhaka Stadium, Dhaka
Referee: Younus Rana (Pakistan)

12 February 1987

Syria	3–0	(India) Mohammedan
Abdul Kader 42'; Mahrous 51'; Romeo Iskander 75'	Report

Dhaka Stadium, Dhaka

14 February 1987

Guangdong (China)	2–0	(India) Mohammedan
Li Chaoyang 13' (pen.); Pang Zhenqiang 68'	Report

Dhaka Stadium, Dhaka

=== Group B ===
Pos	Team	Pld	W	D	L	GF	GA	GD	Pts	Qualification
1	(Soviet Union) Fakel Voronezh	3	3	0	0	10	0	+10	6	Advance to the semi-finals
2	Bangladesh White	3	1	1	1	4	3	+1	3	Advance to the semi-finals
3	Thailand	3	1	1	1	4	6	−2	3	
4	(India) East Bengal	3	0	0	3	1	10	−9	0	

Source: RSSSF
8 February 1987

Bangladesh White	2–2	Thailand
Das 83'; Emily 85'	Report	Pradubapan Jaruaya 67', 75'

Dhaka Stadium, Dhaka
Referee: Younus Rana (Pakistan)

10 February 1987

Bangladesh White	0–1	(Soviet Union) Fakel Voronezh
	Report	Gennadiy Miliuria 42'

Dhaka Stadium, Dhaka

11 February 1987

Thailand	2–1	(India) East Bengal
Pradubapan Jaruaya 44', 73' (pen.)	Report	Chatterjee 13' (pen.)

Dhaka Stadium, Dhaka
Referee: Zahurul Haque (Bangladesh)

12 February 1987

Bangladesh White	2–0	(India) East Bengal
Das 62'; Manu 79'	Report

Dhaka Stadium, Dhaka

13 February 1987

Thailand	0–3	(Soviet Union) Fakel Voronezh
	Report	Sosulin 39' (pen.); Akrov 82'; Andrey Shashkin 85'

Dhaka Stadium, Dhaka

14 February 1987

Fakel Voronezh (Soviet Union)	6–0	(India) East Bengal
Alexandrev ?', ?', ?'; Akrov ?'; Ramosov ?'; Rebasov ?'	Report

Dhaka Stadium, Dhaka

== Knockout stage ==
=== Semi-finals ===
15 February 1987

Guangdong (China)	1–1 (a.e.t.)	Bangladesh White
Qao Yang ?'	Report	Manu ?'
Penalties
Penalty scored	4–3	Kaiser (penalty scored); Badal (penalty scored); Manu (penalty scored); Abul (penalty missed); Emily (penalty missed)

Dhaka Stadium, Dhaka

16 February 1987

Syria	3–1	(Soviet Union) Fakel Voronezh
Walid 13', 33'; Mahrous 69'	Report	Viktor Rybakov 27'

Dhaka Stadium, Dhaka

=== Final ===
18 February 1987

Syria	4–1	(China) Guangdong
Walid 14'; Hussein Deeb 52'; Mahrous 73', 80'	Report	Wu Qunli 3'

Dhaka Stadium, Dhaka
