= Agha Saeed =

Pakistani footballer (born 1962)

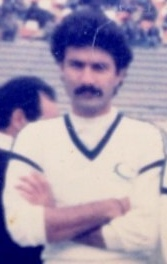
- Saeed with Pakistan at the 1986 Fajr International Tournament

Personal information
- Date of birth: 7 October 1962 (age 64)
- Place of birth: Karachi, Pakistan
- Position: Midfielder

Youth career
- Khada Fisherman Lyari

Senior career*
Years	Team	Apps	(Gls)
- Sindh Government Press
- KESC

International career
1985–1986	Pakistan		(3)
- * Club domestic league appearances and goals

Agha Saeed (Urdu: آغا سعید; born 7 October 1962), is a Pakistani former footballer who played as a midfielder.

== Early life ==
Saeed was born on 7 October 1962. He graduated from Sindh Muslim Government Arts & Commerce College and started his football career at the age of 16 with Khada Fisherman Lyari football club.

== Club career ==
Saeed started his senior career with National Football Championship side Sindh Government Press, where he played an important role in bringing the winning trophy in several local tournaments. Later on, Saeed moved to KESC.

== International career ==
Saeed was selected for Pakistan for the 1985 South Asian Games held in Dhaka. He scored two goals in a 3–1 victory over Maldives, and one goal in a 2–2 draw against Nepal.

The next year, Saeed was also selected in the 1986 Fajr International Tournament held in Tehran, where Pakistan under the leadership of Shaukat Mufti faced Iran, Poland U21 and Al-Fotuwa. In the same year, he featured at the 1986 Quaid-e-Azam International Tournament played in Islamabad, and the 1986 Pakistan President's Gold Cup played in Karachi. In the latter, he scored a goal for Pakistan against President XI to level the match 1–1 in the last minute.

== Post-playing career ==
Saeed later trained his own football club named Shah Faisal Nazimabad. He was honored with the Abdul Majeed Khan Memorial Award for his contributions. He was also invited as guest in several football tournaments held across Pakistan.

== Personal life ==
Saeed has cited Ali Nawaz Baloch and Ghulam Sarwar Sr. as his idol players. He is also father of two sons and a daughter.

== Career statistics ==
=== International goals ===
Scores and results list Pakistan's goal tally first, score column indicates score after each Saeed goal.

List of international goals scored by Agha Saeed
No.	Date	Venue	Opponent	Score	Result	Competition	Ref.
1	22 December 1985	Dhaka Stadium, Dhaka, Bangladesh	Maldives		3–1	1985 South Asian Games	
2	22 December 1985	Dhaka Stadium, Dhaka, Bangladesh	Maldives		3–1	1985 South Asian Games	
3	25 December 1985	Dhaka Stadium, Dhaka, Bangladesh	Nepal		2–2	1985 South Asian Games	
