= Central Asia Champions' Cup =

1985 Central Asia Champions' Cup
Tournament details
- Teams: 6 (from AFC confederations)
- Venue: 1 (in 1 host city)

Final positions
- Champions: (India) East Bengal
- Runners-up: (Bangladesh) Abahani Krira Chakra

Tournament statistics
- Matches played: 15
- Goals scored: 67 (4.47 per match)

The 1985 Central Asia Champions' Cup (also known as the 1985 Coca-Cola Cup due to sponsorship reasons) was an international football competition which served as the qualifier for the 1985–86 Asian Club Championship.

It was held between the domestic champion club sides affiliated with the member associations of the Central and South Asian nations of the Asian Football Confederation. The tournament was held at Colombo. East Bengal won the tournament and qualified for the Asian Club Championship.

== Format ==
The tournament was constituted as part of the different Asian zonal tournaments which were held at centralised venues with the winners of these zonal tournaments progressing into the main tournament which was held in Jeddah, Saudi Arabia. The champions of the Central and South Asian nations were selected to face each other consisting of teams from India, Sri Lanka, Bangladesh, Nepal, Pakistan, Afghanistan, Iran and Maldives however, the two teams from Iran and Afghanistan withdrew their names. The matches were held at Colombo, Sri Lanka.

== Group stage ==
Pos	Team	Pld	W	D	L	GF	GA	GD	Pts	Qualification
1	(India) East Bengal	5	5	0	0	20	0	+20	10	Qualification for the Asian Club Championship group stage
2	(Bangladesh) Abahani Krira Chakra	5	4	0	1	17	4	+13	8	
3	(Sri Lanka) Saunders (H)	5	2	1	2	12	8	+4	5	
4	(Pakistan) PIA	5	1	2	2	8	8	0	4	
5	(Nepal) New Road Team	5	1	1	3	8	11	−3	3	
6	(Maldives) Club Valencia	5	0	0	5	2	36	−34	0	

Source: Champions' Cup 1985/86
(H) Hosts

Note: Afghanistan and Iran did not send a team.

1 August 1985

Saunders (Sri Lanka)	7–0	(Maldives) Club Valencia

Sugathadasa Stadium, Colombo

2 August 1985

East Bengal (India)	7–0	(Nepal) New Road Team
Bhattacharya; Roy; Pradhan (o.g.)

Sugathadasa Stadium, Colombo
2 August 1985

Abahani Krira Chakra (Bangladesh)	3–0	(Pakistan) PIA
Aslam; Kamal; Chunnu (pen.)

Sugathadasa Stadium, Colombo

4 August 1985

PIA (Pakistan)	6–1	(Maldives) Club Valencia

Sugathadasa Stadium, Colombo
4 August 1985

Saunders (Sri Lanka)	2–1	(Nepal) New Road Team

Sugathadasa Stadium, Colombo

5 August 1985

East Bengal (India)	1–0	(Bangladesh) Abahani Krira Chakra
Roy

Sugathadasa Stadium, Colombo

7 August 1985

East Bengal (India)	2–0	(Pakistan) PIA
Bhattacharya; Roy

Sugathadasa Stadium, Colombo

8 August 1985

New Road Team (Nepal)	6–0	(Maldives) Club Valencia

Sugathadasa Stadium, Colombo
8 August 1985

Abahani Krira Chakra (Bangladesh)	4–1	(Sri Lanka) Saunders
Aslam; Bhadra; Kamal		Premalal

Sugathadasa Stadium, Colombo

10 August 1985

East Bengal (India)	9–0	(Maldives) Club Valencia
Roy; Nassiri; Das; Mishra; Choudhury

Sugathadasa Stadium, Colombo
10 August 1985

Abahani Krira Chakra (Bangladesh)	2–1	(Nepal) New Road Team
Aslam (pen.); Johnny		Shah

Sugathadasa Stadium, Colombo

11 August 1985

Saunders (Sri Lanka)	2–2	(Pakistan) PIA

Sugathadasa Stadium, Colombo

13 August 1985

Abahani Krira Chakra (Bangladesh)	8–1	(Maldives) Club Valencia
Aslam; Tutul; Bhadra		?

Sugathadasa Stadium, Colombo
13 August 1985

PIA (Pakistan)	0–0	(Nepal) New Road Team

Sugathadasa Stadium, Colombo

14 August 1985

East Bengal (India)	1–0	(Sri Lanka) Saunders
Nassiri

Sugathadasa Stadium, Colombo

== Winner ==
Central Asia Champions' Cup
1985 Winners

East Bengal
