= Rizvi Karim Rumi =

Bangladeshi footballer

Personal information
- Full name: Mohamed Rizvi Karim Rumi
- Date of birth: 18 May 1968 (age 58)
- Place of birth: Kushtia, East Pakistan (present-day Bangladesh)
- Height: 1.73 m (5 ft 8 in)
- Positions: Center-forward; winger

Youth career
- 1983: Sonali Jute Mills

Senior career*
| Years | Team | Apps | (Gls) |
| 1984–1986 | Sadharan Bima | | |
| 1987 | BRTC | | |
| 1988–1993 | Dhaka Abahani | | |
| 1991 | East Bengal | | |
| 1994–1996 | Muktijoddha | | |
| 1997–1998 | Dhaka Abahani | | |

International career
| 1989–1994 | Bangladesh | 23 | (6) |
Medal record
Men's football
Representing Bangladesh
South Asian Games
| Silver medal – second place | 1989 Islamabad | Team competition |
| Bronze medal – third place | 1991 Colombo | Team competition |
- * Club domestic league appearances and goals

Rizvi Karim Rumi (Bengali: রিজভী করিম রুমি; born 18 May 1968) is a former Bangladeshi footballer who played either as a center-forward or as a winger. Rumi represented the Bangladesh national team in from 1989 to 1994, captaining the team in 1992. He spent most of his club career with Dhaka Abahani and also had a brief stint in India in the Calcutta Football League with East Bengal.

== Early life ==
Rumi was born in Daulatpur Upazila, Kushtia, Bangladesh. He grew up in Daulatpur Thana of Khulna District, where his father, Mohammed Bazlul Karim, worked as a teacher at B.L. College. He was the middle child of three siblings. Rumi supported Dhaka Mohammedan from an early age and began playing football under the guidance of former footballer Mohammed Dara. While studying in the eighth grade at Government Laboratory High School, Rumi began his club career with Sonali Jute Mills in the Khulna First Division Football League in 1983. He had attracted the club's attention the previous year after scoring a hat-trick for Daulatpur Bazar in a local tournament. In his debut season, he finished as the league's third-highest scorer with eight goals. The following year, he represented Khulna District at the National Junior Football Championship in Dhaka, scoring 12 goals as Khulna won the championship.

== Club career ==
=== Sadharan Bima ===
Rumi moved to Dhaka in 1984 after receiving an offer from Sadharan Bima CSC playing in the capital's First Division. He had previously enrolled at B.L. College, but left after moving to Dhaka. His breakthrough came in the inaugural DMFA Cup that year, when an injury to Bima's loaned striker Raj Kumar gave him a starting opportunity. Rumi scored a hat-trick against Azad Sporting, two goals against Brothers Union and another against Mohammedan, finishing as the tournament's joint-top scorer with six goals. He played for the club until 1986. At the time, regulations required new players to remain with a club for three years. After completing the three-year period, although Bima offered him the club's captaincy at the end of the 1986 season, Rumi departed.

=== BRTC ===
In 1987, Rumi joined BRTC SC on a seasonal salary of Tk 150,000. Despite his poor goalscoring record in the First Division, Rumi played an integral role in the club's run to the semi-finals of the 1987 Federation Cup, scoring four goals to finish as joint top scorer with Rumman Bin Wali Sabbir of Mohammedan. His most notable performance for the club came against Dhaka Abahani in the group stage, when he scored and provided an assist in a 2–1 victory that ultimately eliminated the defending champions from the Federation Cup. He also scored in the 3–1 semi-final defeat to eventual champions Mohammedan.

=== Dhaka Abahani ===
In 1988, Rumi joined Dhaka Abahani after being persuaded by club officials Professor Shah Alam and Manzur Quader. He spent most of his debut season with the club in 1988–89 on the bench. Rumi made his breakthrough during an exhibition match held following the conclusion of the league against a touring regional team from Lombardy, Italy. Abahani drew the game 1–1 at the Dhaka Stadium. Rumi also played against the team while representing Khulna XI at the Khulna District Stadium, scoring in a 4–1 defeat. The following season, 1989–90, saw Abahani win the league title for the first time in four years, with Rumi scoring 10 goals to finish as the league's second-highest scorer behind his teammate Sheikh Mohammad Aslam.

In 1989, Rumi received an offer from rivals Mohammedan. However, their Iranian coach, Nasser Hejazi, who also served as coach of the Bangladesh national team at the time, opposed the move, refusing to sign Rumi without permission from Abahani. Rumi later stated that he too had no desire to leave, despite being a Mohammedan supporter, as he wanted to continue playing alongside his teammate Monem Munna, who was regarded as the country's most promising talent at the time. The following year, he scored a brace in a 2–1 victory against Mohammedan in the Independence Cup final, helping Abahani win the tournament for the first time.

In February 1991, during Abahani's triumph at the Sait Nagjee Trophy in India, Rumi scored a brace against Indian Bank and a lone goal against Travancore Titanium. In the 1991 BTC Club Cup held in Dhaka, Rumi scored the winning goal against India's East Bengal in the semi-final, as Abahani went on to win the tournament. In the same year, he helped Abahani win the Azmiri Begum Gold Cup in Feni, defeating India's Mohun Bagan 1–0 in the final. He later represented East Bengal in the Calcutta Football League First Division alongside his Abahani teammates Monem Munna and Sheikh Aslam. He scored once as East Bengal won the league title.

When the First Division resumed in Dhaka from 1991–92, Rumi scored nine goals, helping Abahani retain the league title. He also represented the club in the 1991–92 Asian Cup Winners' Cup. He also represented Brothers Union in the 1992–93 Asian Club Championship as a borrowed player. In 1993, he was made club captain and scored eight goals in the DMFA Cup, as Abahani lost the final to Mohammedan. He also scored nine goals in the inaugural Premier Division, as Abahani again finished runners-up behind Mohammedan, relinquishing the league title they had won in the previous two seasons.

=== Muktijoddha ===
In 1994, Rumi joined Muktijoddha Sangsad KC alongside several of his national teammates, following a gentleman's agreement among the country's three biggest clubs; Dhaka Abahani, Mohammedan, and Brothers Union, to reduce their players' salaries. He spent two years with the Freedom Fighters and won the Federation Cup in 1994. However, during his second season, he fell out with the club's South Korean coach, Kang Man-young, and its officials, eventually leading to his departure.

=== Return to Abahani ===
Rumi returned to Dhaka Abahani for the 1997–98 season. He eventually moved to Canada without announcing his retirement in 1999.

== International career ==
Rumi was part of the Bangladesh national team squad during the 1988 AFC Asian Cup qualification in Abu Dhabi, UAE. He was a member of the Bangladesh Red team which defeated South Korea University in the 1989 President's Gold Cup. During the tournament he became a regular member of the team following the injury of Fakrul Islam Kamal. He made his first official appearance for the national team against Sri Lanka in the 1989 South Asian Games, during which he scored a brace in a 3–0 victory. He was also a member of the national team in the 1990 Asian Games in Beijing, China.

In the 1991 South Asian Games in Colombo, Sri Lanka, Rumi scored a brace against India in the group-stage, as Bangladesh recorded their first-ever victory against the regional giants, winning 2–1. In 1992, Rumi received the Sports Writers Association's Best Footballer Award and was also made Bangladesh captain for the 1992 AFC Asian Cup qualification in Bangkok, Thailand. His final international goals came in the 1994 FIFA World Cup qualification – AFC first round, scoring in 1–0 victory over Sri Lanka Yokohama, Japan, and also in a 4–1 defeat to Japan at Al Maktoum Stadium in UAE.

He later represented the team at the 1993 South Asian Games, where hosts Bangladesh were eliminated in the group stage. Rumi's final international tournament was the Qatar Independence Cup in 1994, in which the BFF sent Muktijoddha Sangsad KC to represent the national team.

== Personal life ==
After retiring from football in 1998, Rumi settled in Canada with his wife and son.

== Career statistics ==
=== International ===
Appearances and goals by national team and year
| National team | Year | Apps | Goals |
|---|---|---|---|
Bangladesh
| Bangladesh | 1989 | 3 | 2 |
| Bangladesh | 1990 | 2 | 0 |
| Bangladesh | 1991 | 3 | 2 |
| Bangladesh | 1992 | 2 | 0 |
| Bangladesh | 1993 | 11 | 2 |
| Bangladesh | 1994 | 2 | 0 |
| Bangladesh | Total | 23 | 6 |

Scores and results list Bangladesh's goal tally first.

List of international goals scored by Rumi
| No. | Date | Venue | Opponent | Score | Result | Competition |
|---|---|---|---|---|---|---|
| 1 | 21 October 1989 | Jinnah Sports Stadium, Islamabad, Pakistan | Sri Lanka | 1–0 | 3–0 | 1989 South Asian Games |
| 2 | 21 October 1989 | Jinnah Sports Stadium, Islamabad, Pakistan | Sri Lanka | 3–0 | 3–0 | 1989 South Asian Games |
| 3 | 26 December 1991 | Sugathadasa Stadium, Colombo, Sri Lanka | India | 1–0 | 2–1 | 1991 South Asian Games |
| 4 | 26 December 1991 | Sugathadasa Stadium, Colombo, Sri Lanka | India | 2–1 | 2–1 | 1991 South Asian Games |
| 5 | 13 April 1993 | Nippatsu Mitsuzawa Stadium, Yokohama, Japan | Sri Lanka | 1–0 | 1–0 | 1994 FIFA World Cup qualification |
| 6 | 30 April 1993 | Al Maktoum Stadium, Dubai, UAE | Japan | 1–1 | 1–4 | 1994 FIFA World Cup qualification |

== Honours ==
Dhaka Abahani

- Dhaka First Division League: 1989–90, 1991–92
- Federation Cup: 1985, 1986, 1988
- Sait Nagjee Trophy: 1989
- Independence Cup: 1990
- Azmiri Begum Gold Cup: 1990
- BTC Club Cup: 1991
- DMFA Cup: 1994
- Charms Cup: 1994

East Bengal

- Calcutta Football League: 1991

Muktijoddha

- Federation Cup: 1994

Bangladesh

- South Asian Games Silver medal: 1989; Bronze medal: 1991

Individual

- 1992 − Sports Writers Association's Best Footballer Award.
