= Kaiser Hamid =

Bangladeshi footballer

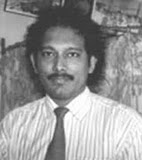

Personal information
- Full name: Mohammad Kaisar Hamid
- Date of birth: 1 December 1964 (age 61)
- Place of birth: Sylhet, East Pakistan (present-day Bangladesh)
- Height: 1.88 m (6 ft 2 in)
- Positions: Central defender; right-back

Senior career*
Years	Team	Apps	(Gls)
1981–1982	Kamal SC		
1982–1983	Rahmatganj		
1983–1984	BJMC		
1984–1985	Rahmatganj		
1985–1996	Dhaka Mohammedan		
1991–1992	Kolkata Mohammedan		

International career
1984–1993	Bangladesh	59	(5)
Medal record
Representing Bangladesh
South Asian Games
Silver medal – second place	1984
Silver medal – second place	1985
Silver medal – second place	1989
Bronze medal – third place	1991
- * Club domestic league appearances and goals

Mohammad Kaisar Hamid (Bengali: মোহাম্মদ কায়সার হামিদ; born 1 December 1964) is a former Bangladeshi footballer. He is known for spending the majority of his career as a central-defender for Mohammedan Sporting Club at both the domestic and continental levels. He also represented the Bangladesh national team at the international level from 1984 to 1993 and served as the captain of both his club and the national team in 1989-91 and 1993, respectively.

== Early life ==
Kaiser Hamid was born on 1 December 1964, in Sylhet, Bangladesh. He comes from a sporting background, with his mother, Rani Hamid, being the first FIDE Woman International Master from Bangladesh, while his father, M. A. Hamid, was a Bangladesh Army lieutenant colonel and the founder of the Bangladesh Handball Federation. Kaiser grew up as the second oldest among three brothers. His older brother, Sohel Hamid, was a national squash champion, while his youngest brother, Bobby Hamid, played football for Wari Club in the First Division. Kaiser represented Sylhet District in the Sher-e-Bangla Cup from 1981 to 1983 and later began representing Dhaka University as an alumnus from 1984.

== Club career ==
=== Early career ===
In 1981, Kaiser debuted in the Second Division with Kamal Sporting Club. In the same year, he represented Dhaka in the U-18 National Junior Football Tournament, after which he was named the tournament's Best Emerging Defender. In 1982, he joined Rahmatganj MFS in the First Division, playing as a right-back under coach, Abdur Rahim. He spent the following season at Team BJMC before returning to Rahmatganj in 1984 after BJMC's relegation from the First Division. His performance with Rahmatganj in the 1984 season earned him his first call-up to the Bangladesh national team.

=== Mohammedan ===
Following his international debut, Kaiser joined Dhaka Mohammedan in 1985. He went on to spend the rest of his career with the Black and Whites, winning the First Division title in 1986, 1987, 1988–89, 1993, 1996, playing as a center-back. He played an ever-present role as Mohammedan were unbeaten in the First Division from 8 September 1985 to 15 March 1990, during which the club won 63 games from the 76 played, and also completed hat-trick league triumphs from 1986 to 1988–89.

In 1986, he marshalled Mohammedan's defense alongside Ranjit Saha, and finished the season with his first league title, playing a crucial role in victories over rivals, Dhaka Abahani and Dhaka Wanderers, in the final two games of the Super League round. He began the 1987 season by lifting the Federation Cup, and in the Super League round of the First Division, Kaiser starred as Mohammedan defeated Abahani 3–2, keeping their domestic double hopes alive, however, with both clubs on equal points, and the return play-off game ending as a stalemate, the players alongside the club officials agreed upon being crowned joint-champions. Nevertheless, the Bangladesh Football Federation (BFF) opted for a second play-off match at the Army Stadium, which saw Mohammedan win 2–0. In the same year, Kaiser also represented the club at the 1987 Asian Club Championship, under the coaching of Nasser Hejazi. Due to his performances at both club and international level, Kaiser eventually received the Sports Writers Association's Best Footballer Award in 1986 and the Best Sportsperson Award in 1988.

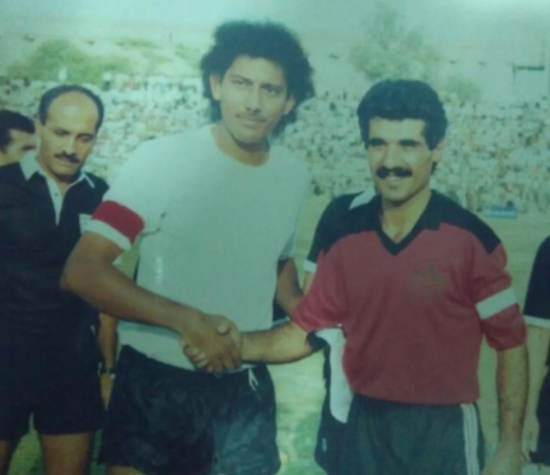
Kaiser Hamid with Shahin Ahvaz captain Masoud Norouzi (right) during the 1989–90 Asian Club Championship

Kaiser also represented the club as it reached the semi-final league round of the 1988–89 Asian Club Championship, during which the Black and Whites defeated both Iran's Persepolis and North Korea's April 25. During the semi-final round held in Kuantan, Malaysia, he scored in a 1–3 defeat to Saudi Arabia's Al-Ittifaq, as Mohammedan finished fourth in a five team group. In the 1989–90 season, Kaiser was appointed as club captain by coach Hejazi. Although the club won the Federation Cup under his captaincy, Mohammedan also ended their five-year unbeaten run in the First Division, and finished runners-up to arch-rivals Dhaka Abahani. In the 1989–90 Asian Club Championship, under Kaiser's captaincy, the Black and Whites crashed out of the qualifying group-stages held in Ahvaz, Iran, finishing runners-up to hosts Shahin Ahvaz. He remained club captain until the 1991 BTC Club Cup, in which Mohammedan lost the final to Abahani. In the same year, with the First Division not being held in Dhaka, Kaiser represented Kolkata Mohammedan in the Calcutta First Division League.

He remained a regular member of the team, helping Mohammedan win the league title in both 1993 and 1996. He was also renowned for his goal-scoring abilities, with one of his most notable goals coming during the DMFA Cup final against Dhaka Abahani in 1993, where he scored from a 30-yard free kick as Mohammedan won 3–2. In 1995, he was an irregular face in the team due to injury problems. He eventually lost his place in the team following the club's appointment of Kang Man-young, who preferred the younger Monwar Hossain Munna and Rajani Kanta Barman at central-defence, and would mainly use Kaiser as a substitute striker during Mohammedan's 1996 league triumph. On 17 December 1996, Kaiser played his final competitive match by coming on as a substitute as Mohammedan defeated Abahani 1–0 at the Sher-e-Bangla National Stadium in what was the 1996 Premier Division season finale.

== International career ==
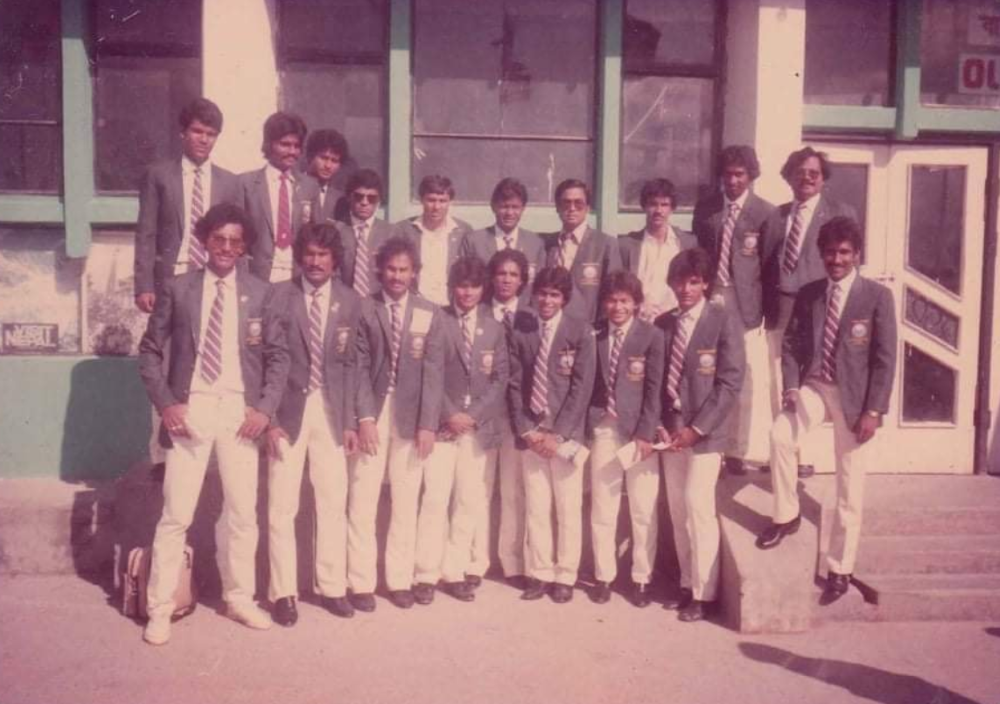
Kaiser (furthest to left, bottom row) with the Bangladesh national team at the 1984 South Asian Games

Kaiser's performances for Rahmatganj MFS saw him earn a call-up to the Bangladesh national team for the 1984 South Asian Games held in Kathmandu, Nepal. His international debut came on 18 September 1984, in a 2–0 victory over Bhutan. Under coach Ali Imam, he played four games during the tournament as Bangladesh finished runners-up. Following his debut, Kaiser represented the national team from 1984 to 1993, making over 50 appearances throughout the decade.

He scored his first international goal on 2 April 1985, during a 2–1 victory against Indonesia in the 1986 FIFA World Cup qualifiers held at the Dhaka Stadium. Notably, this was Bangladesh's first victory in the World Cup qualifiers. In the same year, he featured for the national team which finished runners-up to North Korea in the 1985 Quaid-e-Azam International Tournament in Peshawar, Pakistan. He was also part of the team which again finished runners-up in the 1985 South Asian Games and during the tournament he scored in a 8–0 victory over Maldives. In 1986, he represented Bangladesh at the Pakistan President's Gold Cup in Karachi, scoring in an embarrassing 1–4 defeat to President XI of Pakistan. Nevertheless, the team responded with a 1–0 victory over Pakistan, and finished the tournament in third-place.

Kaiser also appeared in the 1986 and 1990 editions of the Asian Games. He also represented the national team in the six editions of the South Asian Games from 1984 to 1993. Kaiser served vice-captain to Sayeed Hassan Kanan during the 1989 Bangladesh President's Gold Cup. He was eventually made captain in 1993 and led the nation at the 1994 FIFA World Cup qualifiers. During the qualifiers he scored in a 3–0 victory over Sri Lanka at the Al Maktoum Stadium. Later that year, following the appointment of Swiss coach Oldrich Svab, Kaiser's captaincy was controversially taken over by Arif Hossain Moon. His final appearances for the national team came at the 1993 South Asian Games, during which Svab deployed him as a right-back. In the opening match, Kaiser missed a penalty in a goalless draw with Maldives. His final appearance came on 24 December 1993, as Bangladesh crashed out of the tournament with a 0–1 defeat to Nepal.

== Career statistics ==
=== International ===
Appearances and goals by national team and year
National team	Year	Apps	Goals
Bangladesh
Bangladesh	1984	4	0
Bangladesh	1985	11	3
Bangladesh	1986	7	0
Bangladesh	1987	4	0
Bangladesh	1988	5	0
Bangladesh	1989	9	0
Bangladesh	1990	2	0
Bangladesh	1991	3	0
Bangladesh	1992	2	0
Bangladesh	1993	12	2
Bangladesh	Total	59	5

Scores and results list Bangladesh's goal tally first.

List of international goals scored by Kaiser Hamid
No.	Date	Venue	Opponent	Score	Result	Competition
1	2 April 1985	Dhaka Stadium, Dhaka, Bangladesh	Indonesia	1–1	2–1	1986 FIFA World Cup qualification
2	23 December 1985	Dhaka Stadium, Dhaka, Bangladesh	Maldives	3–0	8–0	1985 South Asian Games
3	23 December 1985	Dhaka Stadium, Dhaka, Bangladesh	Maldives	7–0	8–0	1985 South Asian Games
4	7 May 1993	Al Maktoum Stadium, Dubai, UAE	Sri Lanka	2–0	3–0	1994 FIFA World Cup qualification
5	13 December 1993	Mirpur Stadium, Dhaka, Bangladesh	Myanmar	1–1	3–1	Friendly

== Family and personal life ==
Kaiser married Lopa Kaisar in 1993, with whom he has two sons and one daughter. His youngest son, Sadat Hamid, is a former professional footballer who played for Mohammedan SC in the Bangladesh Premier League until 2022. His only daughter, Kaarina Kaisar, was popular Content Creator, who died in May 2026.

In 2003, Kaiser received the National Sports Award. On 10 April 2005, he was one of the ten footballers honored by the Bangladesh Football Federation (BFF) for their extraordinary services to the nation on the occasion of the inauguration of the BFF Bhaban.

Kaiser stood for Dhaka University Central Students' Union elections in 1989–90. Soon after retiring from football in 1996, Kaiser entered politics. He ran on a Zaker Party ticket in the Bangladesh national elections. In 2008, he was sued for attempted murder having reportedly hit a doctor of a state-owned hospital on the head with a pistol. In 2011, Kaiser was back in the news when police arrested former Nigerian footballer Emeka Ezeugo, who was found with Kaiser's licensed revolver.

In 2019, Kaiser was again arrested for embezzling investor funds. The case was filed with Banani police station in 2014 against Kaiser by several people who had invested money in Kaiser's company, New Way Multipurpose Cooperative Society, but never got any returns on their investments. Kaiser eventually received bail on 27 January 2019, after his lawyer argued in favor of his release, leading Dhaka Metropolitan Magistrate Mamunur Rashid to approve bail on a Tk 10,000 bond.

== Honours ==
Dhaka Mohammedan

- Dhaka First Division/Premier Division League: 1986, 1987, 1988–89, 1993, 1996
- Federation Cup: 1987, 1989, 1995
- Ma-O-Moni Gold Cup: 1990
- Independence Cup: 1991
- DMFA Cup: 1993, 1995

Bangladesh

- South Asian Games Silver medal: 1984, 1985, 1989; Bronze medal: 1991

Individual

- 1986 − Sports Writers Association's Best Footballer Award.
- 1988 − Sports Writers Association's Best Sportsperson Award.
- 2003 − National Sports Award.

== Bibliography ==
- Tariq, T Islam (2025). মোহামেডান-আবাহনী ময়দানি লড়াই (transl. Mohammedan-Abahani battle field) (in Bengali). Annesha Prokashon. ISBN 978-984-99475-1-6.
- Alam, Masud (2017). ফুটবলের গল্প ফুটবলারদের গল্প (transl. The story of football the story of footballers) (in Bengali). Bishhoshahitto Bhobon. ISBN 9789849134688.
- Mahmud, Dulal (2018). আমাদের ফুটবলাররা (transl. Our Footballers) (in Bengali). Agamee Prakashani.
- Mahmud, Dulal (2020). খেলার মাঠে মুক্তিযুদ্ধ (transl. Liberation war in the playground) (in Bengali). Bishhoshahitto Bhobon. ISBN 978-984-8218-31-0.
