= S.M. Salahuddin =

Bangladeshi footballer (1958–2020)

- Salahuddin with Mohammedan in 1990

Personal information
- Full name: Sheikh Mohammed Salahuddin
- Date of birth: 1958
- Place of birth: Narayanganj, Pakistan (present-day Bangladesh)
- Date of death: 31 May 2020 (aged 62)
- Place of death: Naraynganj, Bangladesh
- Position: Center-back

Senior career*
Years	Team	Apps	(Gls)
1982–1983	BJMC		
1984–1987	Dhaka Wanderers		
1988–1989	Adamjee		
1989–1991	Dhaka Mohammedan		
1991	Kolkata Mohammedan		
1991–1993	Farashganj		
- * Club domestic league appearances and goals

Sheikh Mohammed Salahuddin (Bengali: শেখ মোহাম্মদ সালাহউদ্দিন; 1958 – 31 May 2020) was a Bangladeshi footballer who played as a center-back. He was a member of the Bangladesh national team from 1989 to 1990.

== Club career ==
Salahuddin began his club career with BJMC in the First Division in 1982, the same year the club was relegated to the Second Division. He represented First Division club Dhaka Wanderers from 1984 to 1987, serving as club captain in his final season, during which he led the team to a runner-up finish in the 1987 Federation Cup.

He joined Mohammedan in 1989 after spending a year at Adamjee. Salahuddin represented the club in the 1990–91 Asian Club Championship, making two appearances during the group stage against India's Salgaocar and the Maldives' Club Lagoons. He was also in the starting lineup as Mohammedan defeated Dhaka Abahani in the final of the 1990 Ma-O-Moni Gold Cup. In 1991, he played in the Calcutta Football League First Division for Kolkata Mohammedan. He left Dhaka Mohammedan during the 1991–92 season to join Farashganj, where he retired in 1993.

== International career ==
Salahuddin was a member of the Bangladesh Red team that won the 1989 President's Gold Cup. The following year, he was included in the squad for the 1990 Asian Games in Beijing, China. However, he did not make an appearance in either tournament.

== Post-retirement ==
Salahuddin served as president of the District Football Association, Sonali Atit Club, and Narayanganj Thana Juba League. He was the team manager of the 2015 SAFF U-16 Championship winning Bangladesh U16 team.

== Death ==
Salahuddin died on 31 May 2020 at his home in Narayanganj. He suffered from a fever caused by pneumonia.

== Honours ==
Dhaka Wanderers

- Federation Cup runners-up: 1987

Mohammedan

- Ma-O-Moni Gold Cup: 1990
- Independence Cup: 1991
- BTC Club Cup: 1991

Bangladesh

- President's Gold Cup: 1989
