= Abdul Shakoor Baloch =

Pakistani football referee

Abdul Shakoor
- Full name: Abdul Shakoor Baloch
- Born: Karachi, Pakistan
- Died: October 2018; Karachi, Pakistan

Domestic
Years	League	Role

International
Years	League	Role
1993–1998	FIFA listed	Referee

Abdul Shakoor Baloch (died October 2018) was a Pakistani FIFA football referee.

== Personal life and career ==
Shakoor first acted as head referee in the domestic National Football Championship, and also refereed several international matches, such as during the 1986 President's Gold Cup International Tournament.

He later became member of the FIFA refereeing panel from 1993 to 1998. In 1997, he was also present at the 1998 FIFA World Cup qualification, where he was the head referee in the match between Cambodia and Uzbekistan on 29 June 1997.

Shakoor later acted as match commissioner in several seasons of the domestic Pakistan Premier League, and as regional referee instructor for the Asian Football Confederation.

== Death ==
Shakoor died in October 2018.
