= Monir Hossain Manu =

Bangladeshi footballer (1959–2018)

- Manu with Mohammedan SC in the 80s

Personal information
- Full name: Monir Hossain Manu
- Date of birth: 13 July 1959
- Place of birth: Dhaka, East Pakistan (present-day Bangladesh)
- Date of death: 20 April 2018 (aged 58)
- Place of death: Dhaka, Bangladesh
- Height: 1.63 m (5 ft 4 in)
- Position: Right winger

Youth career
- 1980: Fakirerpool B

Senior career*
Years	Team	Apps	(Gls)
1981	Avijatrik Malibagh		
1982–1983	BRTC SC		
1984–1987	Mohammedan SC		
1988–1989	Fakirerpool YMC		

International career
1985–1987	Bangladesh		
Medal record
Representing Bangladesh
Men's football
South Asian Games
Silver medal – second place	1985 Kathmandu
- * Club domestic league appearances and goals

Monir Hossain (Bengali: মনির হোসাইন; 13 July 1959 – 20 April 2018), known by his nickname Manu, was a Bangladeshi former footballer who played as a winger. He was commonly regarded as the "Panther of Dhaka football".

== Early life ==
Manu was born on 13 July 1959 in Arambagh, Dhaka. Both of his parents died before the 1971 Liberation War, as Manu, the youngest among five brothers, spent his childhood working in local restaurants, unable to afford an education.

== Club career ==
In 1980, Manu was part of a Pioneer League XI which tied 2–2 with the Bangladesh national team, and in the same year, he participated in the Pioneer League with Fakirerpool B team. After spending the following season with Avijatrik Malibagh in the Dhaka Third Division Football League he joined BRTC Sports Club in the Second Division in 1982.

His debut season saw him guide BRTC to the First Division after 12 years, as league's top scorer with 16 goals. In the final league game against promotion rivals, Muktijoddha Sangsad KC, he scored a brace to ensure BRTC's promotion, leading to the opponent fans vandalising the BRTC clubhouse while also attacking Manu with a hockey stick, which would see him out of action for nearly two months.

Manu made his First Division debut in 1983, but his best performance that year came during the Sher-e-Bangla Cup final for Sylhet District, scoring from a 40-yard strike against Dhaka District. His performances in the tournament, saw Mohammedan SC sign him in 1984. Under coach, Golam Sarwar Tipu, Manu shifted from a striker to a winger.

During the 1986 First Division title deciding game against Abahani Limited Dhaka, Manu shot a 40-yard strike past Indian goalkeeper Bhaskar Ganguly, his goal has been regarded as one of the best scored on the Dhaka field. Mohammedan eventually won the game 2–0, with Manu assisting the second goal scored by Elias Hossain.

His team retained the league title the following year, however, Manu missed majority of the season due to a knee injury which eventually ended his career at Mohammedan. Manu retired after breaking his ankle while captaining Fakirerpool YMC during the 1988–89 First Division season.

== International career ==
Manu entered the Bangladesh national team during the 1985 South Asian Games held on home soil. He also made appearances during the 1985 Quaid-e-Azam International Tournament. On 7 December 1986, he scored against the Singapore national team while representing Mohammedan SC during Nepal's Panchayat Silver Jubilee Cup, a tournament where Mohammedan played as the country's national team.

In 1987, Manu represented Bangladesh White team during the President's Gold Cup. The team was considered to be the senior national team and mainly consisted of players from Mohammedan. During the semi-final he scored against Guangdong FC and although, his team were eventually defeated in the game, Manu received the tournament's Best Player Award. His performances during the tournament also earned him the nickname the "Panther of Dhaka football". He played his final international tournament for the national team the same year, once again appearing in Pakistan's Quaid-e-Azam International Tournament.

== Personal life and death ==
In 2017, Manu underwent treatment for his damaged liver. On 20 April 2018, Manu died at the Bangabandhu Sheikh Mujib Medical University in Dhaka.

Upon his death, the Bangladesh Football Federation paid tribute for the late footballer, listing his name as Mizanur Rahman Manu in their condolence message, while the Dhaka Mahanagari League Committee referred to him as Manwar Hossain Manu. The mistakes were later heavily criticised by both local media and fans.

== Honours ==
BRTC Sports Club

- Dhaka Second Division League: 1982

Mohammedan SC

- Dhaka First Division League: 1986, 1987
- Federation Cup: 1987
- DMFA Cup: 1984

Bangladesh

- South Asian Games Silver medal: 1985

Individual

- 1982 − Dhaka Second Division League top scorer
