= 1986 President's Gold Cup International Tournament =

Tournament details
- Host country: Pakistan
- Dates: 7–15 March 1986
- Teams: 7 (from 1 confederation)
- Venue: National Stadium

Final positions
- Champions: (Iran) Mazandaran Province (1st title)
- Runners-up: (Pakistan) President XI
- Third place: Bangladesh

Tournament statistics
- Top scorer: (Iran) Nader Dastneshan

The 1986 President's Gold Cup International Tournament was held at the National Stadium in Karachi, Pakistan.

== Overview ==
The President's Gold Cup International Football Tournament kicked off at the National Stadium in Karachi on 7 March 1986. The teams competing included Shenyang Army Unit team from China and Bangladesh. Iran was represented by the Mazandaran provincial selection, which had finished third in the 1985 Qods League behind Tehran A and Tehran B. The side, largely composed of Nassaji Mazandaran players, was subsequently selected to represent Iran at the tournament. Three teams from host Pakistan included Pakistan captained by Shaukat Mufti, President XI (also known as simply Sind) managed by former international captain Qadir Bakhsh and composed of several Pakistani international players, and Pakistan Customs.

On the opening day, President's XI defeated Bangladesh 4–1 after the teams were tied 1–1 at halftime. Substitute Din Mohammad put President's XI ahead 2–1 in the 58th minute, and despite a close attempt by Bangladesh in the 74th minute, goalkeeper Ishtiaq made a save. In the 78th minute, left-winger Ghulam Mohammad extended the lead to 3–1 with a solo effort, and seconds before the final whistle, forward Shaukat scored a long-range goal to seal the win. The other match between Pakistan and Mazandaran Province ended in a one-all draw, while the third match between Pakistan Customs and Shenyang Army Unit also ended in a 1–1 draw. Hung Qing Liang sent Shenyang Army Unit ahead in the 7th minute, but striker Ibrahim of Pakistan Customs neutralised the lead three minute later.

On 11 March, Pakistan XI defeated Shenyang Army Unit by a solitary goal scored in the 40th minute through Fida Ur Rehman off a pass from Abdul Majeed. In the other match of the day, Bangladesh were held to a 1–1 draw by Pakistan Customs after leading by a lone goal at the half time.

On 12 March, the match between President's XI and Pakistan ended in a 1–1 draw. Pakistan was losing 1–0 to President's XI and in the last minute, Agha Saeed's goal equalized the match. In an earlier encounter, Mazandaran Province dominated Pakistan Customs by 3–0 to head the points table. However, the next day Bangladesh XI after a close contested match defeated Mazandaran Province by a solitary goal. In the second match of the afternoon, the Shenyang Army Unit drew 1–1 with President's XI. After surrendering the advantage to the President's XI in the 63rd minute when left-winger Ghulam Sarwar Teddy deceived goalkeeper Song Zongsheng with a shot, they levelled in the 81st minute when President's XI were reduced to 10 men.

On 14 March, Pakistan Customs held Pakistan to a goal-less draw. This changed the entire position of the tournament. President's XI had scored six points from five matches followed by Pakistan with five points from four encounters and Mazandaran Province with five points from four games. However, Mazandaran Province gained seven points by defeating the Shenyang Army Unit 2–1, while Bangladesh defeated Pakistan by a solitary goal. The Iranians earned a penalty kick a minute before the half time which was converted by Nader Dastneshan, who also scored the second goal in the 57th minute to put his team 2–0 in front. The Shenyang Army Unit reduced the margin in the 72nd minute with Wang Gang scoring the goal. In the other encounter, Bangladesh surprised Pakistan with Shahinur Kabir Shimul scoring the goal in the 85th minute of the play. However, the Pakistanis disputed referee Abdul Shakoor Baloch's decision as they claimed the deputy referee Israr Ali had raised the flag to signal the scorer off-side but the referee stood firm on its decision.

Mazandaran Province lifted the gold medal, while the President's XI took the silver medal with a superior goal average and Bangladesh earned the bronze. Nader Dastneshan was named the tournament's top scorer.

== Venue ==
Karachi	1986 President's Gold Cup International Tournament is located in Pakistan
National Stadium	1986 President's Gold Cup International Tournament is located in Pakistan
Capacity: 30,000	1986 President's Gold Cup International Tournament is located in Pakistan

== Results ==
Pos	Team	Pld	W	D	L	GF	GA	GD	Pts	Final result
1	(Iran) Mazandaran Province	5	3	1	1	9	4	+5	7	Champions
2	(Pakistan) President XI	5	2	2	1	10	7	+3	6	
3	Bangladesh	5	2	2	1	4	5	−1	6	
4	Pakistan	5	1	3	1	3	3	0	5	
5	(China) Shenyang Army Unit	5	0	3	2	3	5	−2	3	
6	Pakistan Customs	5	0	3	2	3	8	−5	3	

Source: RSSSF

== Matches ==
7 March 1986

President XI (Pakistan)	4–1	Bangladesh
Sarwar (?), 78'; Din Mohammad 58'; Shaukat 89'	Report	Kaiser (?)

National Stadium, Karachi

8 March 1986

Pakistan Customs	1–1	(China) Shenyang Army Unit
Ibrahim 10'	Report	Hung Qing Liang 7'

National Stadium, Karachi

9 March 1986

Shenyang Army Unit (China)	0–0	Bangladesh
	Report

National Stadium, Karachi

March 1986

Pakistan	1–1	(Iran) Mazandaran Province
	Report

National Stadium, Karachi

March 1986

Mazandaran Province (Iran)	v	(Pakistan) President XI
	Report

National Stadium, Karachi

March 1986

President XI (Pakistan)	v	Pakistan Customs
	Report

National Stadium, Karachi

11 March 1986

Pakistan Customs	1–1	Bangladesh
Zahid (?)	Report	Kamal (?)

National Stadium, Karachi

11 March 1986

Pakistan	1–0	(China) Shenyang Army Unit
Fida 40'	Report

National Stadium, Karachi

12 March 1986

Pakistan	1–1	(Pakistan) President XI
Agha 89'	Report

National Stadium, Karachi

12 March 1986

Mazandaran Province (Iran)	3–0	Pakistan Customs
	Report

National Stadium, Karachi

13 March 1986

President XI (Pakistan)	1–1	(China) Shenyang Army Unit
Sarwar 63'	Report	Unknown 81'

National Stadium, Karachi

13 March 1986

Bangladesh	1–0	(Iran) Mazandaran Province
Munna (?)	Report

National Stadium, Karachi

14 March 1986

Pakistan	0–0	Pakistan Customs
	Report

National Stadium, Karachi

15 March 1986

Mazandaran Province (Iran)	2–1	(China) Shenyang Army Unit
Dastneshan 44', 57'	Report	Wang Gang 72'

National Stadium, Karachi

15 March 1986

Pakistan	0–1	Bangladesh
	Report	Shahinur Kabir Shimul 85'

National Stadium, Karachi
Referee: Abdul Shakoor Baloch (Pakistan)
