= Shaukat Mufti =

Pakistani footballer

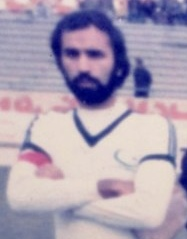
- Mufti with Pakistan at the 1986 Fajr International Tournament

Personal information
- Full name: Shaukat Mahmood Mufti
- Date of birth: 10 January 1955 (age 71)
- Place of birth: Peshawar, Pakistan
- Positions: Left-back; left midfielder

Senior career*
Years	Team	Apps	(Gls)
1980s	National Bank		

International career
1981–1986	Pakistan		(1)
- * Club domestic league appearances and goals

Shaukat Mahmood Mufti (Urdu: شوکت محمود مفتی; born 10 January 1955) is a Pakistani former footballer. The versatile footballer played as a left-back, left midfielder and left-winger. Mufti is among the major players of the Pakistan national football team in the 1980s, and served as captain of the national side in 1986.

== Club career ==
Mufti represented the National Bank departmental team at the National Football Championship.

== International career ==
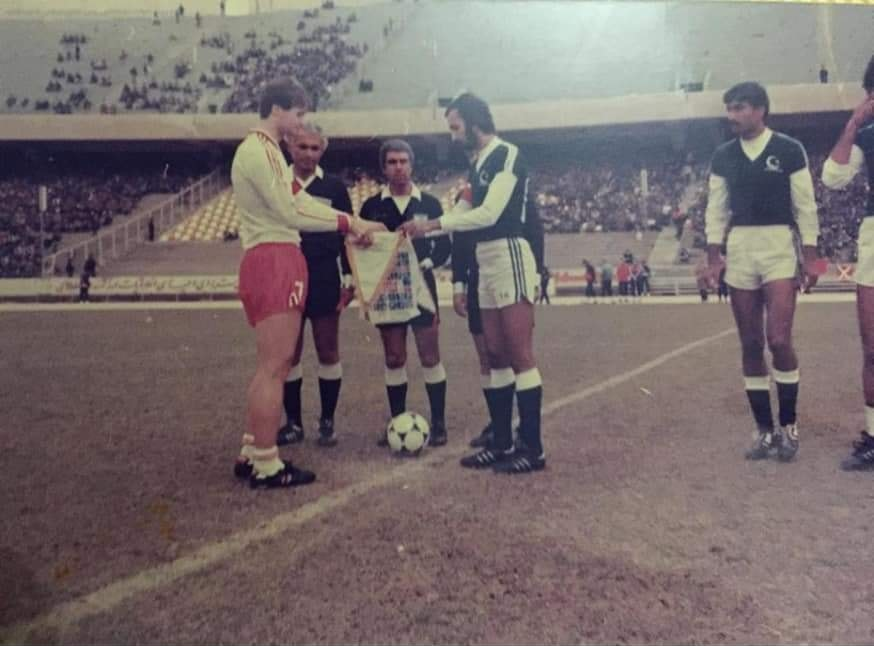
Mufti against the Poland youth team during the 1986 Fajr International Tournament

In 1981, Mufti was selected for the Pakistan national team for a goodwill tour to Burma, and later participated in the 1981 King's Cup held in Thailand as a fullback. The next year he participated at the 1982 Quaid-e-Azam International Tournament held in Karachi with the Pakistan national team, where he featured in all 6 matches as starter.

He later transitioned to a more offensive role during the 1985 South Asian Games, scoring a goal against Maldives.

In 1986, he served as captain of the national side at the 1986 Fajr International Tournament held in Tehran, where the team faced the Poland youth team, Al-Fotuwa, and the Iran national team. He also served as captain of 1986 Pakistan President's Gold Cup campaign the same year, where the national side also faced Bangladesh.

== Career statistics ==
=== International goals ===
Scores and results list Pakistan's goal tally first, score column indicates score after each Mufti goal.

List of international goals scored by Shaukat Mufti
No.	Date	Venue	Opponent	Score	Result	Competition	Ref.
1	22 December 1985	Dhaka Stadium, Dhaka, Bangladesh	Maldives		3–1	1985 South Asian Games	

== See also ==
- List of Pakistan national football team captains
