= Shahinur Kabir Shimul =

Bangladeshi footballer

Shimul
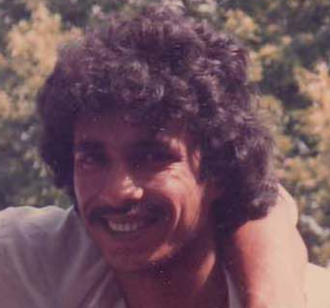
- Shimul in 1987

Personal information
- Full name: Shahinur Kabir Shimul
- Date of birth: c. 1966
- Place of birth: Bogra, East Pakistan (present-day Bangladesh)
- Date of death: 10 December 2014 (aged 48)
- Place of death: Bogra, Bangladesh
- Position: Striker

Senior career*
Years	Team	Apps	(Gls)
1982–1987	Muktijoddha Sangsad		
1987	Brothers Union		
1988–1989	Muktijoddha Sangsad		
1989–1990	Farashganj SC		

International career
1986	Bangladesh		
- * Club domestic league appearances and goals

Shahinur Kabir Shimul (c. 1966 – 10 December 2014) was a Bangladeshi footballer who played as a striker. He represented the Bangladesh team in 1986.

== Club career ==
In 1979, Shimul began playing in the Bogura First Division League after gaining experience from high school football. In 1982, he came to Dhaka to play for Brothers Union in the First Division, however, ended up joining Muktijoddha Sangsad in the Dhaka Second Division League. The following year, he was an integral part of the Freedom Fighters gaining promotion and finished the season with the league title and highest scorer award with 16 goals. He scored two hat-tricks during the league campaign, coming against Police Athletic Club and Alam Textile SC. In 1986, Shimul scored 12 goals to finish the league season as the joint-second highest goal scorer behind Sheikh Mohammad Aslam. In the late 80s, Shimul suffered an injury which would eventually result in his retirement.

== International career ==
In March 1986, Bangladesh national team coach, Abdul Hakim, gave Shimul his first international callup for the 1986 Pakistan President's Gold Cup. On 15 March 1986, he scored his first international goal in a 1–0 victory over hosts Pakistan. The same year, after his consistent performances in the league, Shimul was included in the national team for the 1986 Asian Games held in Seoul, South Korea.

== Career statistics ==
=== International goals ===
List of international goals scored by Shahinur Kabir Shimul
No.	Date	Venue	Opponent	Score	Result	Competition
1	15 March 1986	National Stadium, Karachi, Pakistan	Pakistan	1–0	1–0	1986 Pakistan President's Gold Cup

== Personal life ==
Shimul's father Aftab Hossain played in the Calcutta Football League for Kalighat Milan Sangha and George Telegraph.

His nephew, Nabib Newaj Jibon, also represented the Bangladesh national team.

Shimul joined the Bangladesh Football Coaches Association, following his retirement from playing.

On 10 December 2014, Shimul died of cardiac arrest at a local hospital in Bogra, Bangladesh.

To commemorate his death, the Shimul Memorial Tournament has been regularly held in his home district of Bogura by the Bogura District Football Association.

== Honours ==
Muktijoddha Sangsad KC

- Dhaka Second Division League: 1983

=== Individual ===
- 1983 − Dhaka Second Division League top scorer
