= Abdul Motaleb (footballer) =

Bangladeshi former footballer

Personal information
- Full name: Abdul Motaleb Hossain
- Date of birth: c. 1950
- Place of birth: Dacca, East Bengal, Pakistan (present-day Dhaka, Bangladesh)
- Date of death: 24 September 2017 (aged 67)
- Position: Goalkeeper

Senior career*
Years	Team	Apps	(Gls)
1969–1974	Rahmatganj MFS		
1975–1976	Team BJMC		
1977–1979	Rahmatganj MFS		
1980–1981	Sadharan Bima		
1982–1987	Abahani Krira Chakra		

International career
1975	Bangladesh U19		
1973–1982	Bangladesh		

Managerial career
- 2006–2008: Rahmatganj MFS
- * Club domestic league appearances and goals

Abdul Motaleb (Bengali: আবদুল মোতালেব; 1950 – 24 September 2017) was a Bangladeshi former football coach and player. He was a member of the first Bangladesh national football team in 1973.

== Early life ==
Motaleb Hossain was born in Dhaka, Bangladesh.

== Club career ==
Motaleb began his First Division career with Rahmatganj MFS in 1969. He participated in India's Bordoloi Trophy with the club in 1973 and was also a member of the team that finished runners-up in both the league and Liberation Cup in 1977. Motaleb won Sher-e-Bangla Cup with the Dhaka District three consecutive times from 1973 to 1975.

In 1982, Motaleb joined Abahani Krira Chakra and in the same year scored in the tie-breaker against Team BJMC in the Federation Cup semi-final. Motaleb went on to win the league title with Abahani for three consecutive seasons from 1983 to 1985. He also participated in the 1985–86 Asian Club Championship with the club.

== International career ==
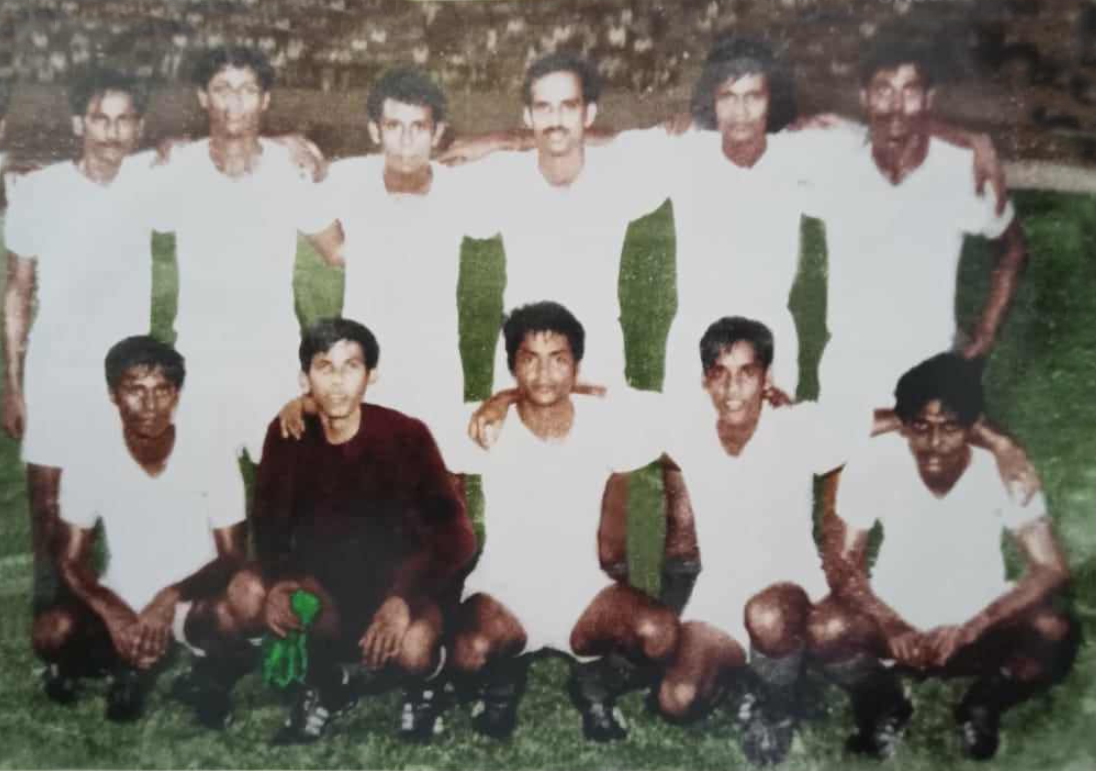
Motaleb (sitting second from the left) with the national team at the 1973 Merdeka Cup in Malaysia.

Motaleb was a member of the first national team selected by coach Sheikh Shaheb Ali in 1973 for the Merdeka Cup held in Malaysia. During the tournament he was used as a second choice goalkeeper to Shahidur Rahman Shantoo.

On 13 August 1973, following the tournament's conclusion, Bangladesh played a friendly against Singapore, and defeated the hosts 1–0 to secure the nations first ever victory in international football. During the game, Motaleb saved a penalty from Singapore, and also recorded the country's first ever cleansheet in international football.

In 1975, Motaleb participated in the 1975 AFC Youth Championship and also represented the senior team during its second time participating in the Merdeka Cup. An aging Motaleb was made captain of the national team for the 1982 Asian Games; however, after making consecutive blunders which led to goals in the tournament's opening game against India, he was replaced by teenage goalkeeper, Mohamed Mohsin for the rest of the games.

== Coaching career ==
Motaleb took advanced training as a goalkeeping coach in Brazil (1995), Germany (1998) and Malaysia (1993). He eventually served as the goalkeeping coach of the national team from 1993 to 2000. In 2007, he served as the head coach of Rahmatganj MFS during the inaugural season of the Bangladesh Premier League.

== Exhibition match ==
On 24 January 2008, Motaleb participated in an exhibition football match between former star footballers of India and Bangladesh at the Bangabandhu National Stadium.

== Death ==
On 24 September 2017, Motaleb died after suffering a cardiac arrest.

== Honours ==
Abahani Krira Chakra

- Dhaka First Division League: 1983, 1984, 1985
- Federation Cup: 1982, 1985, 1986

== Bibliography ==
- Alam, Masud (2017). ফুটবলের গল্প ফুটবলারদের গল্প (transl. The story of football the story of footballers) (in Bengali). Bishhoshahitto Bhobon. ISBN 9789849134688.
- Dulal, Mahmud (2020). খেলার মাঠে মুক্তিযুদ্ধ (transl. Liberation war in the playground) (in Bengali). Bishhoshahitto Bhobon. ISBN 978-984-8218-31-0.
