= 1985 Quaid-e-Azam International Tournament =

Tournament details
- Host country: Pakistan
- Dates: 28 April–4 May 1985
- Teams: 6 (from 1 confederation)
- Venue: Qayyum Stadium

Final positions
- Champions: North Korea XI (1st title)
- Runners-up: Bangladesh
- Third place: Indonesia Youth

Tournament statistics
- Matches played: 10
- Goals scored: 32 (3.2 per match)

The 1985 Quaid-e-Azam International Tournament was the third edition of the Quaid-e-Azam International Tournament. The event was held at the Qayyum Stadium in Peshawar, Pakistan.

== Venue ==
Peshawar	1985 Quaid-e-Azam International Tournament is located in Pakistan
Qayyum Stadium	1985 Quaid-e-Azam International Tournament is located in Pakistan
Capacity: 15,000	1985 Quaid-e-Azam International Tournament is located in Pakistan

== Overview ==
The third Quaid-e-Azam International Tournament in Peshawar began on 28 April 1985. Pakistan fielded two teams; Pakistan Greens which was the national team, and Pakistan Whites which was the B team. Among the remaining participants, only Bangladesh and Nepal fielded their senior national teams. North Korea was represented by a different squad, as their main national team was competing in the 1986 FIFA World Cup qualification. Indonesia was represented by PSSI Junior, a youth selection drawn from the Galasiswa and Galamahasiswa programmes. Most of its players had previously been part of the Indonesia side that won the 1984 Asian Schools Championship in New Delhi.

The tournament’s first hat-trick came in the North Korean team’s 8–1 win over Nepal, with the Koreans leading 6–1 at halftime. Forwards Choy Jae Pil and Kim Kwang each scored four goals, while Nepal’s only goal came from Gyani in the 43rd minute. In another match where Indonesia Youth beat Pakistan Whites 2–0, Pakistan Whites goalkeeper Jahangir had notably saved a penalty, but Indonesia scored through Noach Mariem and Theodorus Bitbit in the 14th and 19th minutes of the first half. Pakistan Whites captain Mehmood made several attempts to score, but his efforts failed to materialise.

The North Korean side clinched the title with a 1–0 win over Bangladesh, thanks to a second-half free-kick goal by Nam in the 50th minute. Indonesia Youth took third place by defeating Pakistan Greens 3–1.

Following the tournament, the North Korean team played three exhibition matches across Pakistan. In the second match, they beat PFF XI 4–0 in Rawalpindi in a match attended by President Zia-ul-Haq, with two goals from Kim Kwang, and one each from Chung Sok Jo Won, and Kim Gung Choi. In their first match they had lost 1–3 to Pakistan Railways in Multan, and defeated Pakistan Customs 3–1 in their third match in Karachi. On 6 May 1985, Nepal, Bangladesh and Indonesia Youth played exhibition matches at the KMC Stadium. In the first match, Nepal lost against Pakistan Steel by 0–1, thanks to a goal of Abdul Samad. In the second match, Bangladesh drew against Habib Bank by 0–0. In the third match, Indonesia Youth beat Karachi Port Trust by 5–0.

== Group stage ==
=== Group 1 ===
Pos	Team	Pld	W	D	L	GF	GA	GD	Pts	Qualification
1	North Korea XI	2	1	1	0	8	1	+7	3	Advance to the semi-finals
2	Pakistan Greens	2	1	1	0	1	0	+1	3	Advance to the semi-finals
3	Nepal	2	0	0	2	1	9	−8	0	

Source: RSSSF
28 April 1985

North Korea XI	0–0	Pakistan Greens
	Report

Qayyum Stadium, Peshawar

29 April 1985

North Korea XI	8–1	Nepal
Kim Kwang 3', 6' (?); Choi Jae-Pil	Report	Gyanu Raja Shrestha 43'

Qayyum Stadium, Peshawar

30 April 1985

Pakistan Greens	1–0	Nepal
Sharafat	Report

Qayyum Stadium, Peshawar

=== Group 2 ===
Pos	Team	Pld	W	D	L	GF	GA	GD	Pts	Qualification
1	Bangladesh	2	1	1	0	4	1	+3	3	Advance to the semi-finals
2	Indonesia Youth	2	1	1	0	3	1	+2	3	Advance to the semi-finals
3	Pakistan Whites	2	0	0	2	0	5	−5	0	

Source: RSSSF
28 April 1985

Bangladesh	1–1	Indonesia Youth
Chunnu 10'	Report	Unknown 80'

Qayyum Stadium, Peshawar

29 April 1985

Indonesia Youth	2–0	Pakistan Whites
Noach Meriem 14'; Theodorus Bitbit 19'	Report

Qayyum Stadium, Peshawar

30 April 1985

Bangladesh	3–0	Pakistan Whites
Babul 22'; Chunnu 40'; Elias 85'	Report

Qayyum Stadium, Peshawar

== Knockout stage ==
=== Semi-finals ===
2 May 1985

Indonesia Youth	0–7	North Korea XI
	Report

Qayyum Stadium, Peshawar
2 May 1985

Pakistan Greens	1–3	Bangladesh
Sharafat 74'	Report	Roy 12'; Bhadra 41'; Chunnu 88' (pen.)

Qayyum Stadium, Peshawar

=== Third-place match ===
3 May 1985 (Note: RSSSF misreported the third place match date as 4 May)

Indonesia Youth	3–1	Pakistan Greens
	Report

Qayyum Stadium, Peshawar

=== Final ===
4 May 1985

Bangladesh	0–1	North Korea XI
	Report	Kim Il Nam 50'

Qayyum Stadium, Peshawar
Referee: Omer Jaffer (Indonesia)
