= Pakistan Customs FC =

Pakistan Customs
- Full name: Pakistan Customs Football Club
- Short name: CUS
- Stadium: Customs Sports Complex, Karachi
- Owner: Pakistan Customs

Pakistan Customs football team serves as the football section of Pakistan Customs. The team has also featured at the National Football Championship, the premier football competition of Pakistan from 1948 till 2003.

== History ==
The team participated at the 1985 Inter-Provincial Championship. Following the 1985 Quaid-e-Azam International Tournament, the visiting North Korean team played three exhibition matches across Pakistan. In the last match against Pakistan Customs, the visitors won by 3–1 in Karachi.

At the 1986 President's Gold Cup International Tournament, the teams competing included Nassaji Mazandaran from Iran, Shenyang Army Unit team from China, and Bangladesh. Three teams from host Pakistan included Pakistan, President XI, and Pakistan Customs. Pakistan Customs ended last in the tournament.

In the 2001 President's Gold Cup, Pakistan Customs reached the quarter-finals, where they were eliminated by National Bank of Pakistan.

=== Revival ===
In 2023, Pakistan Customs began reviving its departmental sports activities after several years of inactivity. In June 2024, Pakistan Customs inaugurated a football academy at the Customs Sports Complex in Karachi, alongside five other academies for cricket, hockey, tennis, archery and Muay Thai, as part of an initiative to promote youth sports.

In October 2025, Pakistan Customs defeated Sindh Police 3–2 in a challenge match at the KPT Football Stadium in Karachi.

== Stadium ==
The Customs Sports Complex in Karachi serve as the team own ground.
