= Samrat Hossain Emily =

Bangladeshi footballer

Emily
Personal information
- Full name: Samrat Hossain Emily
- Date of birth: 16 June 1966 (age 60)
- Place of birth: Narayanganj, East Pakistan
- Positions: Attacking midfielder; striker

Senior career*
Years	Team	Apps	(Gls)
1982	Wari Club Dhaka		
1983–1985	Abahani Krira Chakra		
1986–1992	Mohammedan SC		

International career
1984	Bangladesh U19		
1982–1988	Bangladesh		
Medal record
Representing Bangladesh
South Asian Games
Silver medal – second place	1984
- * Club domestic league appearances and goals

Samrat Hossain Emily was a Bangladeshi footballer of the 1980s. After starting his career as a striker, he moved to the role of an attacking midfielder in the 2nd half of the decade. He is among the few footballers who played with equal success for both the giants Mohammedan SC and Abahani Limited Dhaka. Between 1983 and 1988-89 he won a record 6 successive league titles. He also represented the Bangladesh national team from 1982 to 1988.

== Club career ==
=== Early days ===
A product of the Pioneer Football League, Emily got his big break while playing for Dhaka First Division League club Wari AC in 1982. He was specially impressive in the Super League, scoring against Abahani Krira Chakra in the final matchday. Thanks to his goals, Wari finished fourth in the league, their best finish of the decade.

=== The tug of war ===
The beginning of 1983 saw both the Dhaka giants Mohammedan SC and Abahani Krira Chakra engage in a tug of war for his services. At the end he joined the sky blues from Dhanmondi. Initially there were some concerns about his success at Abahani, as the sky blues already had the legendary forward Kazi Salahuddin as their premier striker. However, Emily proved a great success in his debut season combining superbly with both Salahuddin and left winger Ashrafuddin Ahmed Chunnu. In his debut match for Abahani, against Calcutta MSC he scored a superb headed goal.

He won three successive league titles with Abahani between 1983 and 85, but his contribution in the last two seasons suffered due to successive injuries. In September, 1985, he suffered a career-threatening injury while playing against the Pakistan Air Force team at the 1985–86 Asian Club Championship in Colombo, Sri Lanka. After this incident, the club decided to release him.

=== As a midfielder ===
After Abahani released him, he joined their rivals Mohammedan SC in 1986. The first season did not go well for Emily, but he played an important part in winning the league and went on to win three successive titles for them. This saw him become the only player in history to win six successive First Division League titles. With the Black and whites he played a different role, as a no 10 and also scored the only goal in the 1987 Federation Cup final against Dhaka Wanderers. Emily eventually announced retirement after the 1991–92 season due to the injury he suffered during his time with Abahani.

== International career ==
In 1982, he made his international debut playing as an attacker for the Bangladesh Red team, which was the main Bangladesh national team during the President's Gold Cup in Dhaka. Emily played a similar role for the Bangladesh White team during the 1987 edition of the President's Gold Cup. The team mainly consisting of Mohammedan SC players were considered to be the main national team during the tournament. They were led by Badal Roy to the semi-finals before losing to Chinese club Guangdong on penalties. During the tournament Emily found the net once, coming in a 2–2 draw against Thailand, scoring a header from a Badal Roy corner in the 85th minute. He also represented Bangladesh in youth level scoring against Hong Kong U19 at the 1985 AFC Youth Championship qualifiers. Bangladesh won the game 2–0 with Arif Abdul Khalek scoring the other goal.

List of international goals scored by Samrat Hossain Emily
No.	Date	Venue	Opponent	Score	Result	Competition
–	16 March 1984	Dhaka Stadium, Dhaka, Bangladesh	Hong Kong		2–0	1985 AFC Youth Championship qualification
1	19 September 1984	Dasharath Stadium, Kathmandu, Nepal	Maldives		5–0	1984 South Asian Games
2	8 February 1987	Dhaka Stadium, Dhaka, Bangladesh	Thailand	2–2	2–2	1987 President's Gold Cup

== Personal life ==
In October 2013, Emily accused, Shamim Osman, the leader of political party Awami League, of physically assaulting him.

== Honours ==
Abahani Krira Chakra

- Dhaka First Division League: 1983, 1984, 1985
- Federation Cup: 1985

Mohammedan SC

- Dhaka First Division League: 1986, 1987, 1988–89
- Ma-O-Moni Gold Cup: 1990
- Independence Cup: 1991

Bangladesh

- South Asian Games Silver medal: 1984
