= Badal Roy (footballer) =

Bangladeshi footballer (1957–2020)

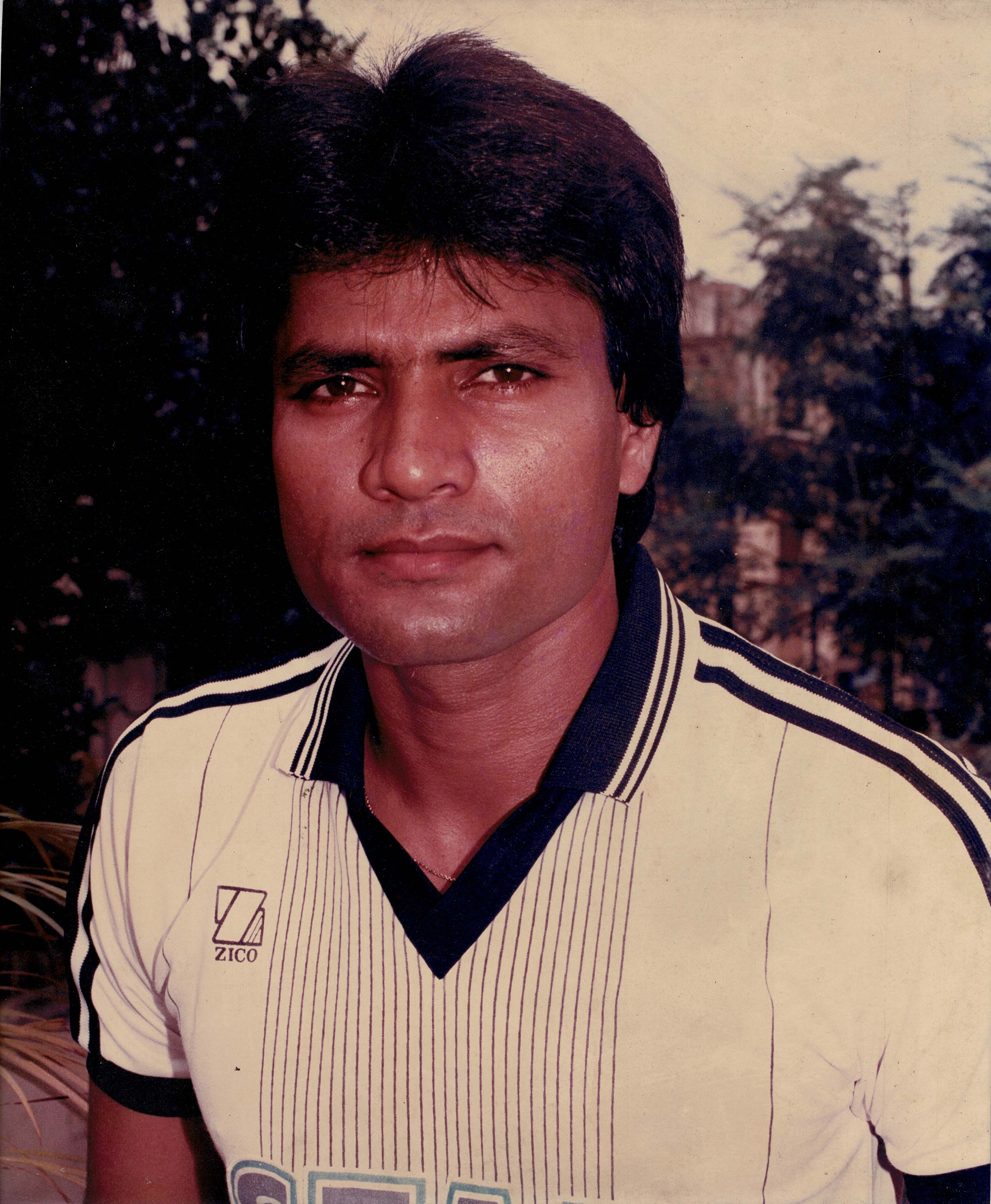

Personal information
- Full name: Badal Kumar Roy
- Date of birth: 4 July 1957
- Place of birth: Comilla, East Pakistan
- Date of death: 22 November 2020 (aged 63)
- Height: 1.73 m (5 ft 8 in)
- Position: Attacking midfielder

Senior career*
Years	Team	Apps	(Gls)
1977–1989	Mohammedan Sporting Club		

International career
1981–1986	Bangladesh		
Medal record
Representing Bangladesh
South Asian Games
Silver medal – second place	1985
- * Club domestic league appearances and goals

Badal Roy (4 July 1957 – 22 November 2020) was a Bangladeshi footballer. He was an attacking midfielder for the Mohammedan Sporting Club during the 1980s, at a time when the club was battling for supremacy against Abahani Krira Chakra on the Bangladeshi football scene. He played for Mohammedan for the entirety of his club career from 1977 until 1989, winning the title five times. He also played for the Bangladesh national football team from 1981 to 1986.

Roy later served as the vice-president of Bangladesh Football Federation for 3 terms from 2008 to 2020. He was also a vice-president of Bangladesh Olympic Association.

Roy won the National Sports Award in 2009.

== Personal life ==
He studied at Comilla Victoria Government College and had a degree in sociology from Dhaka University.

In November 2020, Roy died due to liver and post COVID-19 complications.

== Mohammedan Sporting Club ==
Roy is one of the very few footballers in Bangladesh history who spent his entire career with just one club. He joined the black and whites in 1977 and ended his club career there in 1989. During his playing days, MSC won the First Division title in 1978, 1980, 1982, 1986, 1987, and 1988–89.

=== Club captain ===
Though Roy joined MSC in 1977, he mainly established himself in the team in 1980. In 1981 he was made the club captain for one year. He led the team to the Federation Cup title, and the team reached the SF of the Aga Khan Gold Cup football tournament. But, MSC performed poorly in the League as the arch rivals Abahani clinched the title.

== National team ==
Roy made his national team debut playing for the Bangladesh Green team in the 1st President's Gold Cup held in Dhaka in early 1981. His team reached the SF there. He remained a regular with the national team until 1987. His biggest moment in national colors came in the Delhi Asiad of 1982, when he scored a goal in Bangladesh's 2–1 victory over Malaysia.

In early 1987, Roy led the Bangladesh (White) team in the President's Gold Cup held in Dhaka. The team reached the SF before losing to Guangdong club from China in tie breakers.

Roy contested the 1991 parliamentary election, the first one to be held after the fall of the dictatorship of HM Ershad, as a losing candidate for the Awami League.

== Career statistics ==
=== International goals ===
#	Date	Venue	Opponent	Score	Result	Competition
1.	24 November 1982	Ambedkar Stadium, New Delhi, India	Malaysia	2–0	2–1	1982 Asian Games
2.	2 May 1985	Qayyum Stadium, Peshawar, Pakistan	Pakistan	1–0	3–1	1985 Quaid-e-Azam International Tournament

== Honours ==
Mohammedan SC

- Dhaka First Division League: 1978, 1980, 1982, 1986, 1987, 1988–89
- Federation Cup: 1980, 1981, 1982, 1983, 1987, 1989
- Ashis-Jabbar Shield Tournament (India): 1982

Bangladesh

- South Asian Games Silver medal: 1985

=== Awards and accolades ===
- 2009 − National Sports Award
