= Ratnayaka Premalal =

Sri Lankan footballer

Ratnayake Premlal
Personal information
- Full name: Ratnayake Mudiyanselage Upul Premalal
- Date of birth: 16 November 1963 (age 62)
- Place of birth: Colombo, Sri Lanka
- Height: 1.68 m (5 ft 6 in)
- Position: Right winger

Senior career*
Years	Team	Apps	(Gls)
??–1985	Saunders		
1985–1989	Dhaka Abahani		
1989–1990	Old Benedictans		
1991–1992	PWD		
1993–??	Saunders		

International career
1983–1993	Sri Lanka		

Managerial career
- –: Blue Star SC
- * Club domestic league appearances and goals

Ratnayaka Premalal (Sinhala: රත්නායක ප්‍රේමලාල්; born 16 November 1963) is a Sri Lankan former football player and manager. He represented the Sri Lanka national team from 1983 to 1993.

== Club career ==
=== Saunders SC ===
Premalal represented Saunders SC during the Central Asia Champions' Cup in Colombo, Sri Lanka, which served as the qualifier for the 1985–86 Asian Club Championship. During the tournament he scored in a 4–1 defeat to Bangladeshi representatives, Dhaka Abahani.

=== Dhaka Abahani ===
Following the conclusion of the Central Asia Champions' Cup, Premalal joined Dhaka Abahani. In his debut season in Bangladesh, he played an instrumental part in Abahani securing the Dhaka First Division League title. Nevertheless, his most notable performance came in the Federation Cup semi-finals on 19 April 1986, during which he became the first player to score a hat-trick in a Dhaka derby, which ended 4–4 in regulation time, with Abahani defeating Mohammedan SC 4–1 on penalties.

=== Old Benedictans ===
Premalal represented Old Benedictans in the 1989–90 Asian Club Championship qualifying tournament held in Ahvaz, Iran.

=== PWD SC ===
In the 1991–1992 season, Premalal returned to Bangladesh where he played under the coaching of his former Dhaka Abahani and Sri Lanka teammate, Pakir Ali.

== International career ==
Premalal represented the Sri Lanka national team from 1983 to 1993.

== Managerial career ==
Premalal served as head coach of Blue Star SC at the 2005 AFC President's Cup.

== Career statistics ==
=== International ===
Scores and results list Sri Lanka's goal tally first.

List of international goals scored by Premalal
#	Date	Venue	Opponent	Score	Result	Competition
1.	22 October 1984	Prince Abdullah Al-Faisal Stadium, Jeddah, Saudi Arabia	Nepal	1–0	4–0	1984 AFC Asian Cup qualification
2.	22 October 1984	Prince Abdullah Al-Faisal Stadium, Jeddah, Saudi Arabia	Nepal	3–0	4–0	1984 AFC Asian Cup qualification
3.	21 October 1989	Sugathadasa Stadium, Colombo, Sri Lanka	Nepal		2–2	1991 South Asian Games

== Honours ==
Dhaka Abahani

- Dhaka First Division League: 1985
- Federation Cup: 1986
