= Ashraf Uddin Ahmed Chunnu =

Bangladeshi footballer

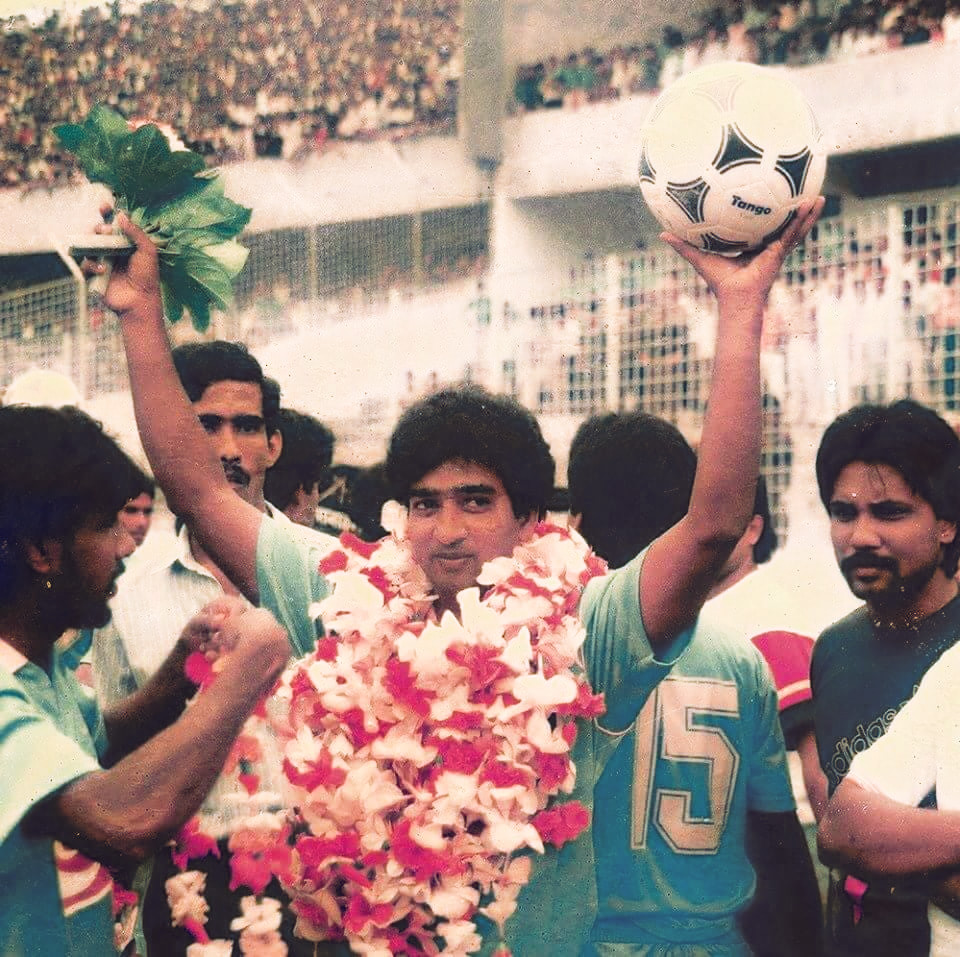
- Chunnu's retirement in 1988

Personal information
- Full name: Ashraf Uddin Ahmed Chunnu
- Date of birth: 1 August 1956 (age 70)
- Place of birth: Narayanganj, East Pakistan (present-day Bangladesh)
- Height: 1.69 m (5 ft 7 in)
- Position: Left winger

Senior career*
Years	Team	Apps	(Gls)
1973	Dilkusha		
1974	Rahmatganj		
1975–1988	Dhaka Abahani		

International career
1975–1985	Bangladesh	41	(17)

Managerial career
- 1988: Dhaka Abahani
Medal record
Representing Bangladesh
South Asian Games
Silver medal – second place	1984
- * Club domestic league appearances and goals

Ashraf Uddin Ahmed Chunnu (Bengali: আশরাফ উদ্দিন আহমেদ চুন্নু; born 1 August 1956) is a Bangladeshi former professional football player and coach. He played for Dhaka Abahani as a left-winger in the First Division from 1975 to 1988, winning the league title a toal of five times. He is the all-time top goalscorer of the Bangladesh national team, with 17 official goals, having represented the country between 1975 and 1985, captaining in 1982. Following retirement in 1988, he served in coaching and administrative roles with both Dhaka Abahani and the Bangladesh Football Federation.

== Early life ==
Ashraf Uddin Ahmed Chunnu was born on 1 August 1956, in Paikpara suburb, Narayanganj District, East Pakistan (present-day Bangladesh). He completed his matriculation at Joy Govinda High School in Narayanganj before gaining admission to Dhaka University. At a young age, Chunnu, received his football training under former East Bengal Railway left-winger Alauddin Khan at the Gymkhana Field (now Alauddin Khan Stadium) in Narayanganj. While he was in eighth grade, his coach, Alauddin Khan converted Chunnu, initially a goalkeeper, into a left-winger.

== Club career ==
=== Early career ===
Chunnu began his football career in the Dhaka First Division Football League with Dilkusha SC in 1973. The following year, he joined Rahmatganj MFS, and with the club he also participated in the Bordoloi Trophy in Guwahati, India. In the same year, Chunnu began representing the Dhaka District football team in the National Football Championship, winning the championship that year. He represented the Combined University football team in the 1975 National Championship and in a tournament held in Kolkata. In 1977 and 1978, he represented the Dhaka District and Bangladesh Railway football teams, respectively.

=== Dhaka Abahani ===
In 1975, Chunnu joined Dhaka Abahani on the recommendation of Sheikh Kamal. He spent 13-years at the club winning the First Division title five times in 1977, 1981, 1983, 1984 and 1985. In 1979, Chunnu served as the captain of the club as Abahani finished runners-up in the First Division. In the same year, he also represented the team in the 1979 Aga Khan Gold Cup in Dhaka, notably scoring against Afghanistan XI in a 5–1 victory on 30 November 1979. In the following year, Chunnu served as joint captain alongside Shafiul Arefin Tutul, as Abahani finished fourth in the league, which was at the time their lowest finish since foundation.

On 21 September 1982, Chunnu and several Abahani teammates were arrested after crowd violence erupted during a league match against Mohammedan SC. Following a disputed goal, police raided locations across Dhaka, including the national team camp for the 1982 Asian Games, and detained the players. They were brought before a military court and surprisingly accused of plotting to overthrow the new military ruler, Lt. General Hussain Muhammad Ershad. Chunnu and Kazi Salahuddin received one-month prison sentences and were to be transferred to Jessore by night train, but public crowds at Kamalapur station blocked their departure, prompting the imposition of Section 144. The players were eventually sent to prisons outside Dhaka and released after 17 days amid widespread criticism.

On 30 October 1983, Chunnu scored in a memorable 2–2 draw against Mohammedan in the first-leg match of the 1983 First Division League, the point was eventually vital for Abahani, who went on to win the league title by overtaking their rivals. In the 1985–86 Asian Club Championship Central Asia Zone, Chunnu scored in a 3–0 victory against Pakistani club, PIA FC. Nevertheless, he became an irregular in the starting eleven from that year, as Abahani former teammate and then coach, Kazi Salahuddin, brought in young wingers Fakrul Islam Kamal and Ratnayaka Premalal, and secured their third consecutive league title.

On 11 November 1988, Chunnu officially announced his retirement during the Federation Cup final against Mohammedan. Although he did not play that day, he entered the field wearing his No. 12 jersey, which he had worn throughout his career at the club, and received an ovation from the fans. Notably, he served as a player-cum-coach and led Abahani to the final of the tournament. He eventually served as joint head coach in the final alongside Algimantas Liubinskas, as Abahani won 1–0. Additionally, Chunnu received the Best Footballer Award from the Sports Writers Association in 1980 and the National Sports Council in 1988.

== International career ==
Chunnu began his international career with the Bangladesh U20 team in the 1975 AFC Youth Championship held in Kuwait. In the same year, as a 19-year old, he made his debut for the Bangladesh national team in the 1975 Merdeka Tournament in Malaysia. In the following year, he appeared in the 1976 King's Cup in Thailand.

He was among the five Dhaka Abahani players who boycotted national selection ahead of the 1978 Asian Games in Thailand, after club teammate, and veteran defender Monwar Hossain Nannu was stripped off national captaincy. He made his return to the team in the 1980 AFC Asian Cup qualification held on home soil. In the qualifiers, he scored his first international goal against Afghanistan on 5 March 1979, as Bangladesh won 3–2, which eventually secured their place in the main tournament. In same year, he featured in the 1979 President's Cup Football Tournament held in South Korea, scoring in a 1–4 defeat against Sudan and 3–1 victory against Sri Lanka. In the 1980 AFC Asian Cup held in Kuwait, Chunnu scored in the first group match against North Korea, which ended in a 2–3 defeat.

In the 1981 Bangladesh President's Gold Cup, Chunnu reprsented Bangladesh Green team, the senior national team, scoring in 3–1 victory over Combined Baghdad XI from Iraq in a group match. In the following year, he captained Bangladesh in the 1982 Quaid-e-Azam International Tournament in Pakistan. His only goal in the tournament came in a 1–3 defeat against Oman, as Bangladesh finished lowest of the seven participating teams. He missed the 1982 Asian Games in India due to the Bangladesh Football Federation imposing an additional suspension on the Abahani players imprisoned following the Dhaka derby on 21 September 1982.

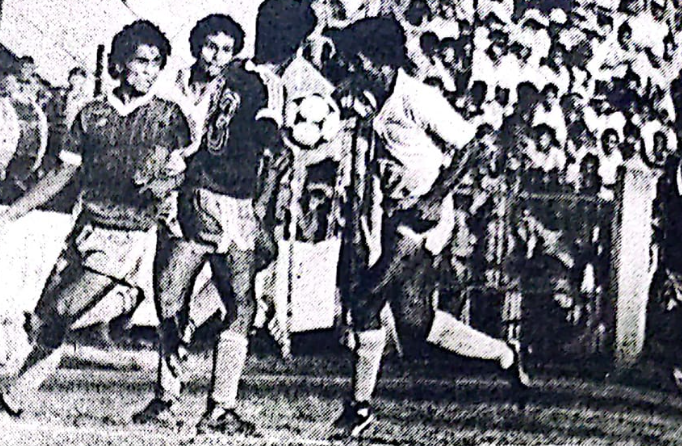
Chunnu (R) at the 1984 South Asian Games final versus Nepal

He made his return in the 1983 Bangladesh President's Gold Cup, and on 4 September 1983, scored a hat-trick in a 4–2 victory over Nepal in a group match, becoming the first Bangladeshi player to achieve the feat. In the same year, he featured in the 1983 Merdeka Tournament in Malaysia, scoring in defeats to both Primera B of Argentina and South Korea XI. He also represented Bangladesh in the 1984 AFC Asian Cup qualification in Indonesia. In the same year, participated in the 1984 South Asian Games, scoring in group matches against Bhutan and Maldives, the latter being a brace. In the final he scored another brace as Bangladesh went down to hosts Nepal by 2–4. He finished the tournament as top scorer with five goals.

On 30 March 1985, Chunnu scored Bangladesh's first FIFA World Cup qualification goal in a 1–2 defeat against India in the 1986 FIFA World Cup qualification – AFC first round match held in Dhaka. On 2 April, he scored the winning goal from a free-kick as Bangladesh defeated Indonesia by 2–1 on home soil, to secure their first ever victory in FIFA World Cup qualification. In the same year, he represented Bangladesh in the 1985 Quaid-e-Azam International Tournament in Pakistan, scoring against Indonesia in a 1–1 draw and against Pakistan Whites in a 3–0 victory during the group stage. His final international goal came in the semi-finals, where he scored a penalty in a 3–1 victory over Pakistan. In the final held on 4 May 1985, Bangladesh lost to North Korea by 0–1, which ended up being Chunnu's final appearance for his country.

== Post-playing career ==
Chunnu guided Dhaka Abahani to the 1988 Federation Cup final as player-cum-coach. In the final, he announced his retirement as a player, and served a joint head coach alongside Algimantas Liubinskas, as Abahani won the tournament. He served as the team manager during Abahani's Sait Nagjee Football Tournament triumph in India in 1989. From 1988-90, he served in numerous positions at the club, including as coach, manager, coordinator, chief coordinator, football editor, and director.

He contested in the 1991 Bangladeshi general election from Narayanganj-4 under the Awami League banner, losing out to Bangladesh Nationalist Party representative, Sirajul Islam. In 1996, Chunnu won the National Sports Award.

In 1998, he served as the team manager of the Bangladesh U19 team. In 2003, he served as the director and football secretary of Dhaka Abahani. In 2005, he was made the team manager of the Bangladesh national team. He also served as the joint secretary of Bangladesh Football Federation (BFF) and the deputy secretary general of the Bangladesh Olympic Association (BOA). It was under his supervision that the first-ever Dhaka Metropolis School tournament was held in 2003. He was also the football committee chairman of Sheikh Jamal Dhanmondi Club.

He was a critique of Kazi Salahuddin's tenure as BFF president from 2008 to 2024, despite having backed Salahuddin's initial election.

== Career statistics ==
=== International ===
Scores and results list Bangladesh's goal tally first.

List of international goals scored by Ashrafuddin Ahmed Chunnu
No.	Date	Venue	Opponent	Score	Result	Competition
1.	5 March 1979	Dhaka Stadium, Dhaka, Bangladesh	Afghanistan	1–1	3–2	1980 AFC Asian Cup qualification
2.	10 September 1979	Seoul Stadium, Seoul, South Korea	Sudan	1–3	1–4	1979 President's Cup
3.	14 September 1979	Cheongju Stadium, Cheongju, South Korea	Sri Lanka	2–1	3–1	1979 President's Cup
4.	16 September 1980	Sabah Al-Salem Stadium, Kuwait City, Kuwait	North Korea	2–3	2–3	1980 AFC Asian Cup
5.	19 February 1982	National Stadium, Karachi Pakistan	Oman	1–3	1–3	1982 Quaid-e-Azam International Tournament
6.	4 September 1983	Dhaka Stadium, Dhaka, Bangladesh	Nepal	2–0	4–2	1983 President's Gold Cup
7.	4 September 1983	Dhaka Stadium, Dhaka, Bangladesh	Nepal	3–0	4–2	1983 President's Gold Cup
8.	4 September 1983	Dhaka Stadium, Dhaka, Bangladesh	Nepal	4–0	4–2	1983 President's Gold Cup
9.	18 September 1984	Dasharath Rangasala, Kathmandu, Nepal	Bhutan	2–0	2–0	1984 South Asian Games
10.	19 September 1984	Dasharath Rangasala, Kathmandu, Nepal	Maldives	1–0	5–0	1984 South Asian Games
11.	19 September 1984	Dasharath Rangasala, Kathmandu, Nepal	Maldives	4–0	5–0	1984 South Asian Games
12.	23 September 1984	Dasharath Rangasala, Kathmandu, Nepal	Nepal	1–1	2–4	1984 South Asian Games
13.	23 September 1984	Dasharath Rangasala, Kathmandu, Nepal	Nepal	2–4	2–4	1984 South Asian Games
14.	30 March 1985	Dhaka Stadium, Dhaka, Bangladesh	India	1–1	1–2	1986 FIFA World Cup qualification
15.	2 April 1985	Dhaka Stadium, Dhaka, Bangladesh	Indonesia	2–1	2–1	1986 FIFA World Cup qualification
16.	28 April 1985	Qayyum Stadium, Peshawar, Pakistan	Indonesia	1–0	1–1	1985 Quaid-E-Azam International Tournament
17.	2 May 1985	Qayyum Stadium, Peshawar, Pakistan	Pakistan	3–1	3–1	1985 Quaid-E-Azam International Tournament

== Honours ==
=== Player ===
Dhaka Abahani

- Dhaka First Division League: 1977, 1981, 1983, 1984, 1985
- Federation Cup: 1982, 1985, 1986, 1988
- Liberation Cup: 1977

=== Manager ===
Dhaka Abahani

- Federation Cup: 1988

=== Individual ===
- 1980 − Sports Writers Association's Best Footballer Award.
- 1988 − National Sports Council Best Footballer Award.
- 1996 − National Sports Award.

== See also ==
- List of top international men's football goal scorers by country

== Bibliography ==
- Tariq, T Islam (2025). মোহামেডান-আবাহনী ময়দানি লড়াই (transl. Mohammedan-Abahani battle field) (in Bengali). Annesha Prokashon. ISBN 978-984-99475-1-6.
- Alam, Masud (2017). ফুটবলের গল্প ফুটবলারদের গল্প (transl. The story of football the story of footballers) (in Bengali). Bishhoshahitto Bhobon. ISBN 9789849134688.
- Mahmud, Dulal (2018). আমাদের ফুটবলাররা (transl. Our Footballers) (in Bengali). Agamee Prakashani.
- Mahmud, Dulal (2020). খেলার মাঠে মুক্তিযুদ্ধ (transl. Liberation war in the playground) (in Bengali). Bishhoshahitto Bhobon. ISBN 978-984-8218-31-0.
