= Mahmudul Haque Liton =

Bangladeshi footballer

Liton
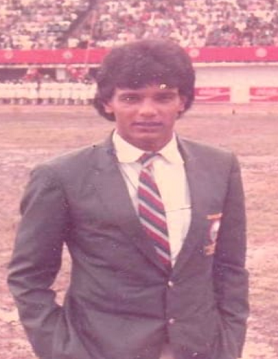
- Liton at the 1984 South Asian Games

Personal information
- Full name: Mahmudul Haque Liton
- Date of birth: 13 December 1963 (age 62)
- Place of birth: Chuadanga, East Pakistan
- Height: 1.78 m (5 ft 10 in)
- Position: Striker

Senior career*
Years	Team	Apps	(Gls)
1981	Victoria SC	0	(0)
1981–1983	East End Club		
1983–1989	Brothers Union		
1989–1991	Dhaka Abahani		
1992	Wari Club		
1993–1995	East End Club		

International career
1984	Bangladesh U19		
1982–1987	Bangladesh		

Managerial career
- 1992: Wari Club Dhaka
- 1993: East End Club
- 1997: Sri Lanka U20
- 1998: Bangladesh U20 (assistant)
- 2003: Bangladesh (assistant)
- 2010–2011: Sheikh Russel KC
- 2012: Rahmatganj MFS
- 2012–2013: Feni SC
- 2015: Feni SC
Medal record
Representing Bangladesh
South Asian Games
Silver medal – second place	1984
- * Club domestic league appearances and goals

Mahmudul Haque Liton (Bengali: মাহমুদুল হক লিটন; born 13 December 1963) is a retired Bangladeshi football player and coach.

== Club career ==
Liton initially participated in the Dhaka First Division Volleyball League in 1978.

He eventually shifted to football and in 1981, he trialed for East End Club, however he registered for Victoria SC in the Dhaka First Division League. After failing to make an appearance for Victoria, he joined East End Club in the mid-season window. In 1983, Liton joined Brothers Union, and was later made club captain in 1986. In 1985, he scored against Abahani Krira Chakra during the title deciding match which Brothers lost 2–3 at the Dhaka Stadium. In the same year, he represented Muktijoddha Sangsad KC as a guest player at the ANFA Cup held in Kathmandu, Nepal.

In 1987, he suffered a major injury during a league encounter with Dhaka Wanderers, which kept him out of the game for months. He was also a guest player for Mohammedan SC at the 1988–89 Asian Club Championship. In 1989, he joined Abahani where he won both the 1989 First Division League and 1990 Independence Cup. He retired in 1995 after winning the second-tier, with East End Club.

== International career ==
In 1982, Liton began his international career, representing the Bangladesh Green team at the President's Gold Cup. In 1984, he represented Bangladesh U19 at the 1985 AFC Youth Championship qualifiers and registered a goal against Singapore U19. During the 1984 South Asian Games, Liton established himself as a regular in the national team, as Bangladesh finished runners-up to hosts Nepal. He was also part of the national squad at the 1986 President's Gold Cup in Dhaka and 1986 Pakistan President's Gold Cup in Karachi.

== Managerial career ==
In 1992, Liton was the coach cum player at Wari Club, and guided the club to an eight place finish in the Premier Division. In 1993 he was the coach cum captain of East End Club. In 1996 he completed a coaching course in Sri Lanka and the following year he coached the Sri Lanka U20 team. In 1999, he completed the AFC B license course. In the professional league era, Liton coached Sheikh Russel KC, and guided them to third-place finish in 2010–11 Bangladesh League. He was appointed Rahmatganj MFS coach for the 2012 Bangladesh Premier League, before being sacked a month before the season ended as Rahmatganj eventually got relegated. He was also the head coach of Feni SC during both 2012–2013 and 2015 league seasons.

== Honours ==
Abahani Limited Dhaka

- Dhaka First Division League: 1989–90
- Independence Cup: 1990

East End Club

- Dhaka First Division League: 1995

Bangladesh

- South Asian Games Silver medal: 1984
