= Elias Hossain =

Bangladeshi footballer

Personal information
- Full name: Mohammed Elias Hossain
- Date of birth: 10 October 1962 (age 64)
- Place of birth: Gopalganj, East Pakistan (present-day Bangladesh)
- Height: 1.79 m (5 ft 10 1/2 in)
- Positions: Attacking midfielder; striker

Senior career*
Years	Team	Apps	(Gls)
1979–1980	Abahani Krira Chakra		
1981	Azad SC		
1982–1983	Dhaka Wanderers		
1984–1990	Mohammedan SC		
1991–1992	Brothers Union		

International career
1984	Bangladesh U19		
1983–1989	Bangladesh		
Medal record
Representing Bangladesh
South Asian Games
Silver medal – second place	1985
Silver medal – second place	1989
- * Club domestic league appearances and goals

Elias Hossain is a retired Bangladeshi footballer who played as an attacking midfielder. He played for the Bangladesh national team from 1983 to 1989. He also captained the national team during the 1989 South Asian Games. Elias is also the only player from Gopalganj to play for the Bangladesh national team. He is currently working as an executive director for the Bangladesh Football Federation.

== Club career ==
In 1977, the Jubilee Rangers took on Friends Club, which was the Gopalganj First Division title deciding match. Elias Hossain played as a substitute for Jubilee Rangers in that match. Many star footballers of Dhaka including Kazi Salahuddin and Ashrafuddin Ahmed Chunnu came to Gopalganj to play the match as, Jubilee Rangers lost 2–1 to Friends Club that day. Seeing the young midfielders technique, Abahani officials took him to Dhaka, to train with the club.

Although, Elias was not able to establish his position in the starting XI, he impressed Abahani coach Ali Imam, who later sent him to Azad Sporting Club in order to get game time, in 1981. After a year at Azad, Elias moved to falling giants Dhaka Wanderers Club, where he also played for a single season. In 1984, Elias got his big move to Mohammedan SC, where he spent 7 years at. In 1986, Elias scored as Mohammedan defeated arch-rivals Abahani 2–0, in the Dhaka First Division League title deciding match, thus, ending Abahani's aim for a fourth consecutive league title and break Mohammedan's 3 year title drought. In 1988, Elias was made Mohammedan's captain and led the club until 1990.

== International career ==
Elias made his Bangladesh national team debut during the 1983 Merdeka Cup in Malaysia. On 5 April 1985, Elias scored his first international goal, which came in a 1–0 win over Thailand, during the 1986 FIFA World Cup qualifiers. During the 1985 South Asian Games Elias managed to score again as Bangladesh put 8 goals past Maldives. However, during the final of the SAFF Games, he missed an open net goal during the game, and was heavily criticized by fans and media later on as Bangladesh lost the match 1–4 on penalties.

During the 1989 South Asian Games, Elias captained Bangladesh as, they again took on India in the group stages. His midfield partner, Nurul Haque Manik helped Bangladesh take the lead, however, after a challenge from defender Rezaul Karim Rehan in the penalty box, Bangladesh conceded a late penalty. While protesting the decision, Elias pushed the referee in anger, leading to his ban from national football. After going through many complications, that game ended up to be Elias's last with the national team.

== International goals ==
Scores and results list Bangladesh's goal tally first.

=== Bangladesh ===
#	Date	Venue	Opponent	Score	Result	Competition
1.	5 April 1985	Dhaka Stadium, Dhaka	Thailand	1–0	1–0	1986 FIFA World Cup qualifiers
2.	23 December 1985	Dhaka Stadium, Dhaka	Maldives	1–0	8–0	1985 South Asian Games

== Personal life ==
On 13 October 2020, Elias's mother Hasina Begum died at the age of 83.

Since 2012, Elias has been the executive director of the Bangladesh Football Federation. He involved with his hometown club Gopalganj Sporting Club, a club which was incepted in 2021. In 2016, he was involved in opening a football academy in his hometown Gopalganj.

== Honours ==
Mohammedan Sporting

- Dhaka First Division League: 1986, 1987, 1988–89
- Federation Cup: 1983, 1987, 1989
- Ma-O-Moni Gold Cup: 1990

Bangladesh

- South Asian Games Silver medal: 1985, 1989

Awards and accolades

- 2013 − National Sports Award

== Bibliography ==
- Alam, Masud (2017). ফুটবলের গল্প ফুটবলারদের গল্প (transl. The story of football the story of footballers) (in Bengali). Bishhoshahitto Bhobon. ISBN 9789849134688.
