= Football at the 1985 South Asian Games =

Tournament details
- Host country: Bangladesh
- Dates: 21–25 December
- Teams: 6 (from 1 confederation)

Final positions
- Champions: India (1st title)
- Runners-up: Bangladesh
- Third place: Nepal

Tournament statistics
- Top scorer(s): (India) Sisir Ghosh (4 goals)

The men's football tournament at the 1985 South Asian Games was held from 21 to 25 December 1985 in Dhaka, Bangladesh. Nepal was the defending champion.

India won the tournament by defeating Bangladesh in the final.

== Participating nations ==
Country	Appearance
Bangladesh (Host)	2nd
Bhutan	2nd
India	1st
Maldives	2nd
Nepal	2nd
Pakistan	1st

== Fixtures and results ==
=== Group A ===
Pos	Team	Pld	W	D	L	GF	GA	GD	Pts	Qualification
1	Bangladesh	2	2	0	0	10	1	+9	4	Gold medal match
2	Pakistan	2	1	0	1	4	3	+1	2	Bronze medal match
3	Maldives	2	0	0	2	1	11	−10	0	

Source: RSSSF
21 December 1985

Bangladesh	2–1	Pakistan
Mahfuzul 27', 89'		Ejaz 11'

Dhaka Stadium, Dhaka
22 December 1985

Pakistan	3–1	Maldives
Agha Saeed 18', 44'; Shaukat 39'		Moosa 48'

Dhaka Stadium, Dhaka
Referee: Abdur Rashid (Bangladesh)
23 December 1985

Bangladesh	8–0	Maldives
Elias 22'; Aslam 30', 78'; Kaiser 35', 75'; Wasim 53', 60'; Mahfuzul 55'	Report

Dhaka Stadium, Dhaka
Referee: Roshan Kumar Shrestha (Nepal)

=== Group B ===
Pos	Team	Pld	W	D	L	GF	GA	GD	Pts	Qualification
1	India	2	2	0	0	5	0	+5	4	Gold medal match
2	Nepal	2	1	0	1	1	2	−1	2	Bronze medal match
3	Bhutan	2	0	0	2	0	4	−4	0	

Source: RSSSF
21 December 1985

India	2–0	Nepal
Sisir

Dhaka Stadium, Dhaka
22 December 1985

Nepal	1–0	Bhutan
Dhirendra Kumar Pradhan 32'

Dhaka Stadium, Dhaka
Referee: Ataul Huq Mallik (Bangladesh)
23 December 1985

India	3–0	Bhutan
Babu Mani 62', 72'; Sisir 83'

Dhaka Stadium, Dhaka
Referee: Zahirul Haque (Bangladesh)

== Bronze medal match ==
25 December 1985

Pakistan	2–2 (a.e.t.)	Nepal
Anwar 11'; Saeed 58'		Dhirendra Kumar Pradhan 44'; AMB Mala 83'
Penalties
Agha Saeed (penalty scored); Mukhtar (penalty scored); Nasir Abbas (penalty missed); Zulfiqar Ahmed (penalty missed); Shaukat (penalty missed)	2–3	Mani Shah (penalty scored); Ganesh Pandey (penalty scored); Dhirendra Kumar Pradhan (penalty scored)

Dhaka Stadium, Dhaka

== Gold medal match ==
25 December 1985

India	1–1 (a.e.t.)	Bangladesh
Sisir 37'	Report	Aslam 39'
Penalties
Krishnendu (penalty scored); Debashis Misra (penalty scored); Krishanu (penalty scored); Prasanta (penalty scored)	4–1	Kaiser (penalty scored); Aslam (penalty missed); Abu Yusuf (penalty missed)

Dhaka Stadium, Dhaka

== Winners ==
Football at the 1985 South Asian Games

India
First title
