= Fakrul Islam Kamal =

Bangladeshi footballer

Personal information
- Full name: Fakrul Islam Kamal
- Date of birth: 1 July 1965 (age 61)
- Place of birth: Chittagong, East Pakistan
- Positions: Right winger; striker

Senior career*
Years	Team	Apps	(Gls)
1981–1982	Dhanmondi Club		
1983	Brothers Union		
1984	Dhanmondi Club		
1985–1990	Dhaka Abahani		

International career
1982–1987	Bangladesh B		
1986–1989	Bangladesh		
Medal record
Representing Bangladesh
South Asian Games
Silver medal – second place	1989
- * Club domestic league appearances and goals

Fakrul Islam Kamal (Bengali: ফকরুল ইসলাম কামাল; born 1 July 1965) is a retired Bangladeshi professional footballer played as a winger.

== Early life ==
Kamal was born in Chandraghona of Chittagong Division, Bangladesh on 1 July 1965.

== Club career ==
Kamal caught the eye of Dhanmondi Club officials while representing Rangamati District in the Sher-e-Bangla Cup, and joined the Dhaka First Division League club in 1981. After two years with Dhanmondi-based club, Kamal joined Brothers Union in 1983, despite being a bindings player of Dhanmondi Club, leading him to be banned for the entire season. In 1984, he returned to Dhanmondi Club, and remained participating in the First Division of Chittagong with Chittagong Abahani. While playing for the Chittagong-based club, he caught the eye of Dhaka Abahani coach Kazi Salahuddin and was signed by the Dhaka-based club in 1985. His most notable moments while playing for Abahani, came during the 1988 Federation Cup, scoring the winner in the Dhaka derby against Mohammedan. He also scored an important goal against Brothers Union in a 3–2 victory in the 1985 league title deciding match. Kamal also represented Abahani at the 1985–86 Asian Club Championship held in Colombo, Sri Lanka, scoring against both Sri Lanka's Saunders SC and Pakistan's PIA. He ended his short career playing in both Dhaka and Chittagong in 1990.

== International career ==
Kamal began his international career playing for Bangladesh Green (national B team) in the 1982 Bangladesh President's Gold Cup. He also represented the B team, Bangladesh Blue, at the 1987 tournament, scoring against both Kolkata Mohammedan and Syria. He made his official debut for the Bangladesh national team in the 1986 Pakistan President's Gold Cup. During the tournament, Kamal scored in a 1–1 draw with Pakistan Customs. He was also an integral part of the national team during the 1988 AFC Asian Cup qualifiers, 1989 South Asian Games and 1990 FIFA World Cup qualifiers.

== Honours ==
Abahani Limited Dhaka

- Dhaka First Division League: 1985, 1989–90
- Federation Cup: 1985, 1986, 1988
- Independence Cup: 1990

Bangladesh

- South Asian Games Silver medal: 1989

== Bibliography ==
- Alam, Masud (2017). ফুটবলের গল্প ফুটবলারদের গল্প (transl. The story of football the story of footballers) (in Bengali). Bishhoshahitto Bhobon. ISBN 9789849134688.
- Dulal, Mahmud (2020). খেলার মাঠে মুক্তিযুদ্ধ (transl. Liberation war in the playground) (in Bengali). Bishhoshahitto Bhobon. ISBN 978-984-8218-31-0.
