= Nepal national football team results =

- Win Draw Loss

This article details the international fixtures and results of the Nepal national football team.

== Fixtures and results ==
* Nepal score always listed first

Win Draw Loss

=== 1972 ===
Date	Opponent	Result	Score*	Venue	Competition	Nepal scorers	Refs.
13 October 1972	China	L	2–6	Workers' Stadium, Beijing, China	International friendly	Unknown	

=== 1981 ===
Date	Opponent	Result	Score*	Venue	Competition	Nepal scorers	Refs.
31 March 1981	Bangladesh	D	1–1	Dhaka, Bangladesh	1981 Bangladesh President's Gold Cup	Krishna Thapa	

=== 1982 ===
Date	Opponent	Result	Score*	Venue	Competition	Nepal scorers	Refs.
12 February 1982	Pakistan	L	0–2	National Stadium, Karachi, Pakistan	1982 Quaid-e-Azam International Tournament		
16 February 1982	Bangladesh	D	1–1	National Stadium, Karachi, Pakistan	1982 Quaid-e-Azam International Tournament	Bidur Bista	
17 February 1982	Oman	L	0–1	National Stadium, Karachi, Pakistan	1982 Quaid-e-Azam International Tournament		
20 February 1982	Iran	L	0–4	National Stadium, Karachi, Pakistan	1982 Quaid-e-Azam International Tournament		
1 April 1982	Bhutan	W	3–1	Dasharath Rangasala, Kathmandu, Nepal	1982 ANFA Cup	Unknown	
April 1982	Thailand	W	1–0	Dasharath Rangasala, Kathmandu, Nepal	1982 ANFA Cup	Unknown	
2 May 1982	Philippines	W	1–0	Bangkok, Thailand	1982 King's Cup	Unknown	
5 May 1982	Singapore	L	0–2	Bangkok, Thailand	1982 King's Cup		
7 May 1982	Thailand	L	1–3	Bangkok, Thailand	1982 King's Cup	Ganesh Thapa	
21 November 1982	Kuwait	L	1–3	New Delhi, India	1982 Asian Games	Yam Bahadur Ghale	
23 November 1982	Iraq	L	0–3	New Delhi, India	1982 Asian Games		
26 November 1982	Burma	L	0–3	New Delhi, India	1982 Asian Games		

=== 1983 ===
Date	Opponent	Result	Score*	Venue	Competition	Nepal scorers	Refs.
10 April 1983	Thailand	L	0–2	Dasharath Rangasala, Kathmandu, Nepal	1983 ANFA Cup		
5 September 1983	Bangladesh	L	2–4	Bangladesh	1983 Bangladesh President's Gold Cup	Krishna Thapa; Ganesh Thapa	
19 September 1983	Malaysia	L	0–7	Kota Bharu, Malaysia	Merdeka Tournament 1983		
22 September 1983	Bangladesh	L	0–1	Seremban, Malaysia	Merdeka Tournament 1983		

=== 1984 ===
Date	Opponent	Result	Score*	Venue	Competition	Nepal scorers	Refs.
18 September 1984	Maldives	W	4–0	Dasharath Rangasala, Kathmandu, Nepal	1984 South Asian Games	Ganesh Thapa (2); Krishna Thapa; Rupak Raj Sharma	
20 September 1984	Bhutan	W	5–0	Dasharath Rangasala, Kathmandu, Nepal	1984 South Asian Games	Ganesh Thapa (2); Kiran Rai (2); Krishna Thapa	
21 September 1984	Bangladesh	L	0–5	Dasharath Rangasala, Kathmandu, Nepal	1984 South Asian Games		
23 September 1984	Bangladesh	W	4–2	Dasharath Rangasala, Kathmandu, Nepal	1984 South Asian Games	Own goal Yam Bahadur Ghale (2); Mahesh Panthi	
19 October 1984	Saudi Arabia	L	0–7	Jeddah, Saudi Arabia	1984 AFC Asian Cup qualification		
22 October 1984	Sri Lanka	L	0–4	Jeddah, Saudi Arabia	1984 AFC Asian Cup qualification		
26 October 1984	United Arab Emirates	L	0–11	Jeddah, Saudi Arabia	1984 AFC Asian Cup qualification		
28 October 1984	Oman	L	0–8	Jeddah, Saudi Arabia	1984 AFC Asian Cup qualification		

=== 1985 ===
Date	Opponent	Result	Score*	Venue	Competition	Nepal scorers	Refs.
2 March 1985	South Korea	L	0–2	Dasharath Rangasala, Kathmandu, Nepal	1986 FIFA World Cup qualification		
16 March 1985	Malaysia	D	0–0	Dasharath Rangasala, Kathmandu, Nepal	1986 FIFA World Cup qualification		
31 March 1985	Malaysia	L	0–5	(Malaysia) Stadium Merdeka, Kuala Lumpur	1986 FIFA World Cup qualification		
6 April 1985	South Korea	L	0–4	Dongdaemun Stadium, Seoul, South Korea	1986 FIFA World Cup qualification		
30 April 1985	Pakistan	L	0–1	Peshawar, Pakistan	1985 Quaid-e-Azam International Tournament		
21 December 1985	India	L	0–2	Dhaka, Bangladesh	1985 South Asian Games		
22 December 1985	Bhutan	W	1–0	Dhaka, Bangladesh	1985 South Asian Games	Dhirendra Kumar Pradhan	
25 December 1985	Pakistan	W	2–2; 3–2 (p)	Dhaka, Bangladesh	1985 South Asian Games	Dhirendra Kumar Pradhan; Man Bahadur Malla	

=== 1986 ===
Date	Opponent	Result	Score*	Venue	Competition	Nepal scorers	Refs.
25 April 1986	China	L	0–5	Islamabad, Pakistan	1986 Quaid-e-Azam International Tournament		
27 April 1986	Sri Lanka	D	2–2	Islamabad, Pakistan	1986 Quaid-e-Azam International Tournament	Unknown	
2 May 1986	Pakistan	L	0–5	Islamabad, Pakistan	1986 Quaid-e-Azam International Tournament		
7 June 1986	Bhutan	W	4–0	Dasharath Rangasala, Kathmandu, Nepal	1986 ANFA Cup	Unknown	
20 September 1986	Japan	L	0–5	(South Korea) Daejeon Stadium, Daejeon, Korea Republic	1986 Asian Games		
22 September 1986	Kuwait	L	0–5	(South Korea) Daejeon Stadium, Daejeon, Korea Republic	1986 Asian Games		
26 September 1986	Bangladesh	L	0–1	(South Korea) Daejeon Stadium, Daejeon, Korea Republic	1986 Asian Games		
28 September 1986	Iran	L	0–6	(South Korea) Daejeon Stadium, Daejeon, Korea Republic	1986 Asian Games		
4 December 1986	Bangladesh	W	1–0	Dasharath Rangasala, Kathmandu, Nepal	Panchayat Silver Jubilee Cup 1986	Ganesh Thapa	

=== 1987 ===
Date	Opponent	Result	Score*	Venue	Competition	Nepal scorers	Refs.
25 April 1987	Pakistan	D	2–2	Kathmandu, Nepal	1988 Summer Olympics Qualification	Yam Bahadur Ghale; Ganesh Thapa	
28 April 1987	Pakistan	W	1–0	Kathmandu, Nepal	1988 Summer Olympics Qualification	Dhirendra Kumar Pradhan	
15 September 1987	Japan	L	0–5	Tokyo, Japan	1988 Summer Olympics Qualification		
18 September 1987	Japan	L	0–9	Tokyo, Japan	1988 Summer Olympics Qualification		
23 September 1987	China	L	0–8	Shenyang, China	1988 Summer Olympics Qualification		
26 September 1987	China	L	0–12	Shenyang, China	1988 Summer Olympics Qualification		
1 October 1987	Thailand	L	0–3	Bangkok, Thailand	1988 Summer Olympics Qualification		
4 October 1987	Thailand	L	1–2	Bangkok, Thailand	1988 Summer Olympics Qualification	Unknown	
21 November 1987	Bangladesh	W	1–0	Salt Lake Stadium, Calcutta, India	1987 South Asian Games	Ganesh Thapa	
23 November 1987	Bhutan	W	6–2	Salt Lake Stadium, Calcutta, India	1987 South Asian Games	Ganesh Thapa (5); Mani Shah	
26 November 1987	India	L	0–1	Salt Lake Stadium, Calcutta, India	1987 South Asian Games		

=== 1988 ===
Date	Opponent	Result	Score*	Venue	Competition	Nepal scorers	Refs.
25 May 1988	Hong Kong	D	0–0	Dasharath Rangasala, Kathmandu, Nepal	1988 AFC Asian Cup qualification		
28 May 1988	North Korea	L	0–1	Dasharath Rangasala, Kathmandu, Nepal	1988 AFC Asian Cup qualification		
1 June 1988	Syria	L	0–3	Dasharath Rangasala, Kathmandu, Nepal	1988 AFC Asian Cup qualification		
4 June 1988	Iran	L	0–3	Dasharath Rangasala, Kathmandu, Nepal	1988 AFC Asian Cup qualification		

=== 1989 ===
Date	Opponent	Result	Score*	Venue	Competition	Nepal scorers	Refs.
23 May 1989	Malaysia	L	0–2	(South Korea) Dongdaemun Stadium, Seoul, Korea Republic	1990 FIFA World Cup qualification		
25 May 1989	South Korea	L	0–9	(South Korea) Dongdaemun Stadium, Seoul, Korea Republic	1990 FIFA World Cup qualification		
27 May 1989	Singapore	L	0–3	(South Korea) Dongdaemun Stadium, Seoul, Korea Republic	1990 FIFA World Cup qualification		
3 June 1989	South Korea	L	0–4	National Stadium, Kallang, Singapore	1990 FIFA World Cup qualification		
5 June 1989	Singapore	L	0–7	National Stadium, Kallang, Singapore	1990 FIFA World Cup qualification		
7 June 1989	Malaysia	L	0–3	National Stadium, Kallang, Singapore	1990 FIFA World Cup qualification		
20 October 1989	Maldives	D	0–0	Islamabad, Pakistan	1989 South Asian Games		
22 October 1989	Pakistan	D	0–0	Islamabad, Pakistan	1989 South Asian Games		
26 October 1989	India	L	1–2	Islamabad, Pakistan	1989 South Asian Games	Mani Shah	

=== 1991 ===
Date	Opponent	Result	Score*	Venue	Competition	Nepal scorers	Refs.
22 December 1991	Sri Lanka	D	2–2	Sugathadasa Stadium, Colombo, Sri Lanka	1991 South Asian Games	Rajesh Maskey; Rajesh Manandhar	
24 December 1991	Maldives	L	0–1	Sugathadasa Stadium, Colombo, Sri Lanka	1991 South Asian Games		
28 December 1991	Bangladesh	L	0–2	Sugathadasa Stadium, Colombo, Sri Lanka	1991 South Asian Games		

=== 1993 ===
Date	Opponent	Result	Score*	Venue	Competition	Nepal scorers	Refs.
16 July 1993	Pakistan	D	1–1	Lahore, Pakistan	1993 SAARC Gold Cup	Umesh Pradhan	
19 July 1993	Sri Lanka	D	0–0	Lahore, Pakistan	1993 SAARC Gold Cup		
21 July 1993	India	L	0–1	Lahore, Pakistan	1993 SAARC Gold Cup		
22 December 1993	Bangladesh	W	1–0	Mirpur Stadium, Dhaka, Bangladesh	1993 South Asian Games	Milan Hada	
24 December 1993	Maldives	D	0–0	Mirpur Stadium, Dhaka, Bangladesh	1993 South Asian Games		
26 December 1993	India	W	2–2; 4–3 (p)	Dhaka Stadium, Dhaka, Bangladesh	1993 South Asian Games	Umesh Pradhan; Mani Shah	

=== 1994 ===
Date	Opponent	Result	Score*	Venue	Competition	Nepal scorers	Refs.
1 October 1994	South Korea	L	0–11	Bingo Stadium, Onomichi, Japan	1994 Asian Games		
3 October 1994	Kuwait	L	0–8	Bingo Stadium, Onomichi, Japan	1994 Asian Games		
9 October 1994	Oman	L	0–1	Hiroshima Stadium, Hiroshima, Japan	1994 Asian Games		

=== 1995 ===
Date	Opponent	Result	Score*	Venue	Competition	Nepal scorers	Refs.
2 March 1995	Bangladesh	L	0–2	Colombo, Sri Lanka	1995 SAARC Gold Cup		
29 March 1995	Pakistan	W	2–0	Colombo, Sri Lanka	1995 SAARC Gold Cup	Bal Gopal Maharjan; Hari Khadka	
31 March 1995	Sri Lanka	L	1–2 (a.e.t.)	Colombo, Sri Lanka	1995 SAARC Gold Cup	Deepak Amatya	
19 December 1995	Maldives	W	1–0	Jawaharlal Nehru Stadium, Madras, India	1995 South Asian Games	Hari Khadka	
23 December 1995	Bangladesh	L	1–2	Jawaharlal Nehru Stadium, Madras, India	1995 South Asian Games	Mani Shah	
25 December 1995	India	L	0–3	Jawaharlal Nehru Stadium, Madras, India	1995 South Asian Games		
27 December 1995	Sri Lanka	L	0–0; 5–3 (p)	Jawaharlal Nehru Stadium, Madras, India	1995 South Asian Games		

=== 1996 ===
Date	Opponent	Result	Score*	Venue	Competition	Nepal scorers	Refs.
10 June 1996	Iran	L	0–8	Azadi Stadium, Tehran, Iran	1996 AFC Asian Cup qualification		
12 June 1996	Oman	L	0–7	Azadi Stadium, Tehran, Iran	1996 AFC Asian Cup qualification		
14 June 1996	Sri Lanka	L	1–3	Azadi Stadium, Tehran, Iran	1996 AFC Asian Cup qualification	Narendra Man Shrestha	
17 June 1996	Oman	L	1–2	Sultan Qaboos Sports Complex, Muscat, Oman	1996 AFC Asian Cup qualification	Hari Khadka	
19 June 1996	Iran	L	0–4	Sultan Qaboos Sports Complex, Muscat, Oman	1996 AFC Asian Cup qualification		
21 June 1996	Sri Lanka	L	0–2	Sultan Qaboos Sports Complex, Muscat, Oman	1996 AFC Asian Cup qualification		

=== 1997 ===
Date	Opponent	Result	Score*	Venue	Competition	Nepal scorers	Refs.
23 March 1997	Macau	D	1–1	Sultan Qaboos Sports Complex, Muscat, Oman	1998 FIFA World Cup qualification	Hari Khadka	
25 March 1997	Oman	L	0–1	Sultan Qaboos Sports Complex, Muscat, Oman	1998 FIFA World Cup qualification		
27 March 1997	Japan	L	0–6	Sultan Qaboos Sports Complex, Muscat, Oman	1998 FIFA World Cup qualification		
22 June 1997	Oman	L	0–6	National Stadium, Tokyo, Japan	1998 FIFA World Cup qualification		
25 June 1997	Japan	L	0–3	National Stadium, Tokyo, Japan	1998 FIFA World Cup qualification		
28 June 1997	Macau	L	1–2	National Stadium, Tokyo, Japan	1998 FIFA World Cup qualification	Deepak Amatya	
4 September 1997	Pakistan	L	0–2	Dasharath Rangasala, Kathmandu, Nepal	1997 SAFF Gold Cup		
8 September 1997	Sri Lanka	L	1–3	Dasharath Rangasala, Kathmandu, Nepal	1997 SAFF Gold Cup	Deepak Amatya	

=== 1998 ===
Date	Opponent	Result	Score*	Venue	Competition	Nepal scorers	Refs.
27 November 1998	Thailand	L	0–2	Thailand	International friendly		
1 December 1998	Japan	L	0–5	Trang Stadium, Tran, Thailand	1998 Asian Games		
5 December 1998	India	L	0–1	Trang Stadium, Tran, Thailand	1998 Asian Games		

=== 1999 ===
Date	Opponent	Result	Score*	Venue	Competition	Nepal scorers	Refs.
25 April 1999	Sri Lanka	W	3–2	Nehru Stadium, Margao, India	1999 SAFF Gold Cup	Naresh Joshi (3)	
27 April 1999	Maldives	L	2–3	Nehru Stadium, Margao, India	1999 SAFF Gold Cup	Hari Khadka (2)	
29 April 1999	Bangladesh	L	1–2	Nehru Stadium, Margao, India	1999 SAFF Gold Cup	Balgopal Maharajan	
1 May 1999	Maldives	L	0–2	Nehru Stadium, Margao, India	1999 SAFF Gold Cup		
26 September 1999	Bhutan	W	7–0	Dasharath Rangasala, Kathmandu, Nepal	1999 South Asian Games	Hari Khadka (2); Naresh Joshi; Deepak Amatya; Rajan Rayamajhi; Basanta Thapa (2)	
28 September 1999	Pakistan	W	3–1	Dasharath Rangasala, Kathmandu, Nepal	1999 South Asian Games	Own goal Hari Khadka; Bal Gopal Maharjan	
30 September 1999	India	L	0–4	Dasharath Rangasala, Kathmandu, Nepal	1999 South Asian Games		
2 October 1999	Maldives	W	2–1	Dasharath Rangasala, Kathmandu, Nepal	1999 South Asian Games	Naresh Joshi; Hari Khadka	
4 October 1999	Bangladesh	L	0–1	Dasharath Rangasala, Kathmandu, Nepal	1999 South Asian Games		

=== 2000 ===
Date	Opponent	Result	Score*	Venue	Competition	Nepal scorers	Refs.
26 January 2000	Bhutan	W	1–0	Dasharath Rangasala, Kathmandu, Nepal	2000 ANFA Cup	Dilli Ram Shrestha	
10 February 2000	Yemen	L	0–3	Kuwait	2000 AFC Asian Cup qualification		
12 February 2000	Bhutan	W	3–0	Kuwait	2000 AFC Asian Cup qualification	Basanta Thapa; Naresh Joshi; Nirajan Rayamajhi	
14 February 2000	Turkmenistan	L	0–5	Kuwait	2000 AFC Asian Cup qualification		
18 February 2000	Kuwait	L	0–5	Kuwait	2000 AFC Asian Cup qualification		

=== 2001 ===
Date	Opponent	Result	Score*	Venue	Competition	Nepal scorers	Refs.
12 April 2001	Kazakhstan	L	0–6	Al-Shaab Stadium, Baghdad, Iraq	2002 FIFA World Cup qualification		
14 April 2001	Iraq	L	1–9	Al-Shaab Stadium, Baghdad, Iraq	2002 FIFA World Cup qualification	Nirajan Rayamajhi	
16 April 2001	Macau	W	4–1	Al-Shaab Stadium, Baghdad, Iraq	2002 FIFA World Cup qualification	Nirajan Rayamajhi (2); Basanta Thapa; Hari Khadka	
21 April 2001	Kazakhstan	L	0–4	Almaty Central Stadium, Almaty, Kazakhstan	2002 FIFA World Cup qualification		
23 April 2001	Iraq	L	2–4	Almaty Central Stadium, Almaty, Kazakhstan	2002 FIFA World Cup qualification	Hari Khadka; Nirajan Rayamajhi	
25 April 2001	Macau	W	6–1	Almaty Central Stadium, Almaty, Kazakhstan	2002 FIFA World Cup qualification	Nirajan Rayamajhi (3); Bal Gopal Maharjan; Deepak Lama; Basanta Thapa	

=== 2003 ===
Date	Opponent	Result	Score*	Venue	Competition	Nepal scorers	Refs.
11 January 2003	Bangladesh	L	0–1	Bangabandhu Stadium, Dhaka, Bangladesh	2003 SAFF Gold Cup		
13 January 2003	Bhutan	W	2–0	Bangabandhu Stadium, Dhaka, Bangladesh	2003 SAFF Gold Cup	Nirajan Rayamajhi; Kumar Thapa	
15 January 2003	Maldives	L	2–3	Bangabandhu Stadium, Dhaka, Bangladesh	2003 SAFF Gold Cup	Nirajan Rayamajhi; Dev Narayan Chaudhary	
18 March 2003	Afghanistan	W	4–0	Dasharath Rangasala, Kathmandu, Nepal	2004 AFC Asian Cup qualification	Nirajan Rayamajhi; Hari Khadka (2); Dipak Lama	
20 March 2003	Kyrgyzstan	L	0–2	Dasharath Rangasala, Kathmandu, Nepal	2004 AFC Asian Cup qualification		
25 September 2003	Oman	L	0–7	(South Korea) Daegu, Korea Republic	2004 AFC Asian Cup qualification		
27 September 2003	Vietnam	L	0–5	(South Korea) Daegu, Korea Republic	2004 AFC Asian Cup qualification		
29 September 2003	South Korea	L	0–16	(South Korea) Incheon, Korea Republic	2004 AFC Asian Cup qualification		
19 October 2003	Oman	L	0–6	Sultan Qaboos Sports Complex, Muscat, Oman	2004 AFC Asian Cup qualification		
21 October 2003	Vietnam	L	0–2	Sultan Qaboos Sports Complex, Muscat, Oman	2004 AFC Asian Cup qualification		
24 October 2003	South Korea	L	0–7	Muscat, Oman	2004 AFC Asian Cup qualification		

=== 2005 ===
Date	Opponent	Result	Score*	Venue	Competition	Nepal scorers	Refs.
8 December 2005	India	L	1–2	Peoples Football Stadium, Karachi, Pakistan	2005 SAFF Gold Cup	Basanta Thapa	
10 December 2005	Bangladesh	L	0–2	Peoples Football Stadium, Karachi, Pakistan	2005 SAFF Gold Cup		
12 December 2005	Bhutan	W	3–1	Peoples Football Stadium, Karachi, Pakistan	2005 SAFF Gold Cup	Surendra Tamang; Basanta Thapa; Bijaya Gurung	

=== 2006 ===
Date	Opponent	Result	Score*	Venue	Competition	Nepal scorers	Refs.
2 April 2006	Bhutan	W	2–0	MA Aziz Stadium, Chittagong, Bangladesh	2006 AFC Challenge Cup	Pradeep Maharjan (2)	
4 April 2006	Brunei	L	1–2	MA Aziz Stadium, Chittagong, Bangladesh	2006 AFC Challenge Cup	Tashi Tsering	
6 April 2006	Sri Lanka	D	1–1	MA Aziz Stadium, Chittagong, Bangladesh	2006 AFC Challenge Cup	Pradeep Maharjan	
9 April 2006	India	W	3–0	MA Aziz Stadium, Chittagong, Bangladesh	2006 AFC Challenge Cup	Pradeep Maharjan (2); Basanta Thapa	
12 April 2006	Sri Lanka	D	1–1	MA Aziz Stadium, Chittagong, Bangladesh	2006 AFC Challenge Cup	Basanta Thapa	

=== 2007 ===
Date	Opponent	Result	Score*	Venue	Competition	Nepal scorers	Refs.
8 October 2007	Oman	L	0–2	Sultan Qaboos Sports Complex, Muscat, Oman	2010 FIFA World Cup qualification (first round)		
28 October 2007	Oman	L	0–2	Dasharath Rangasala, Kathmandu, Nepal	2010 FIFA World Cup qualification (first round)		

=== 2008 ===
Date	Opponent	Result	Score*	Venue	Competition	Nepal scorers	Refs.
25 March 2008	Pakistan	W	2–1	Dasharath Rangasala, Kathmandu, Nepal	International friendly	Bharat Khawas; Anil Gurung	
27 March 2008	Pakistan	L	0–2	Dasharath Rangasala, Kathmandu, Nepal	International friendly		
20 May 2008	Thailand	L	0–7	Bangkok, Thailand	International friendly		
24 May 2008	Macau	W	3–2	National Olympic Stadium, Phnom Penh, Cambodia	2008 AFC Challenge Cup qualification	Sandip Rai; Ju Manu Rai (2)	
26 May 2008	Cambodia	W	1–0	National Olympic Stadium, Phnom Penh, Cambodia	2008 AFC Challenge Cup qualification	Ju Manu Rai	
3 June 2008	India	L	0–4	Rasmee Dhandu Stadium, Malé, Maldives	2008 SAFF Championship		
5 June 2008	Maldives	L	1–4	Rasmee Dhandu Stadium, Malé, Maldives	2008 SAFF Championship	Vishad Gouchan	
7 June 2008	Pakistan	W	4–1	Rasmee Dhandu Stadium, Malé, Maldives	2008 SAFF Championship	Raju Tamang; Nirajan Rayamajhi; Ju Manu Rai (2)	
31 July 2008	Myanmar	L	0–3	Gachibowli Athletic Stadium, Hyderabad, India	2008 AFC Challenge Cup		
2 August 2008	North Korea	L	0–1	Gachibowli Athletic Stadium, Hyderabad, India	2008 AFC Challenge Cup		
4 August 2008	Sri Lanka	W	3–0	Gachibowli Athletic Stadium, Hyderabad, India	2008 AFC Challenge Cup	Santosh Sahukhala; Ju Manu Rai; KC Anjan	
15 October 2008	Malaysia	L	0–4	MBPJ Stadium, Petaling Jaya, Malaysia	2008 Merdeka Tournament		
17 October 2008	Afghanistan	D	2–2	MBPJ Stadium, Petaling Jaya, Malaysia	2008 Merdeka Tournament	Anil Gurung; Bijaya Gurung	

=== 2009 ===
Date	Opponent	Result	Score*	Venue	Competition	Nepal scorers	Refs.
11 March 2009	Pakistan	W	1–0	Dasharath Rangasala, Kathmandu, Nepal	2009 ANFA Cup	Own goal	
14 March 2009	Sri Lanka	W	0–0; 4–2 (p)	Dasharath Rangasala, Kathmandu, Nepal	2009 ANFA Cup		
26 March 2009	Palestine	D	0–0	Dasharath Rangasala, Kathmandu, Nepal	2010 AFC Challenge Cup qualification		
28 March 2009	Kyrgyzstan	D	1–1	Dasharath Rangasala, Kathmandu, Nepal	2010 AFC Challenge Cup qualification	Biraj Maharjan	
29 November 2009	Bhutan	W	2–1	India	International friendly	Anil Gurung; Bijaya Gurung	
5 December 2009	Maldives	D	1–1	Bangabandhu Stadium, Dhaka, Bangladesh	2009 SAFF Championship	Ju Manu Rai	
7 December 2009	India	L	0–1	Bangabandhu Stadium, Dhaka, Bangladesh	2009 SAFF Championship		
9 December 2009	Afghanistan	W	3–0	Bangabandhu Stadium, Dhaka, Bangladesh	2009 SAFF Championship	Anil Gurung (2); Bijaya Gurung	

=== 2011 ===
Date	Opponent	Result	Score*	Venue	Competition	Nepal scorers	Refs.
17 March 2011	Bhutan	W	1–0	Dasharath Rangasala, Kathmandu, Nepal	International friendly	Santosh Sahukhala	
19 March 2011	Bhutan	W	2–1	Dasharath Rangasala, Kathmandu, Nepal	International friendly	Bikash Singh Chhetri; Anil Gurung	
7 April 2011	Afghanistan	W	1–0	Dasharath Rangasala, Kathmandu, Nepal	2012 AFC Challenge Cup qualification	Bharat Khawas	
9 April 2011	North Korea	L	0–1	Dasharath Rangasala, Kathmandu, Nepal	2012 AFC Challenge Cup qualification		
11 April 2011	Sri Lanka	D	0–0	Dasharath Rangasala, Kathmandu, Nepal	2012 AFC Challenge Cup qualification		
29 June 2011	Timor-Leste	W	2–1	Dasharath Rangasala, Kathmandu, Nepal	2014 FIFA World Cup qualification – AFC first round	Anil Gurung; Ju Manu Rai	
2 July 2011	Timor-Leste	W	5–0	Dasharath Rangasala, Kathmandu, Nepal	2014 FIFA World Cup qualification – AFC first round	Anil Gurung; Bhola Silwal; Ju Manu Rai; Jagajeet Shrestha; Sujal Shrestha	
23 July 2011	Jordan	L	0–9	Amman International Stadium, Amman, Jordan	2014 FIFA World Cup qualification – AFC second round		
28 July 2011	Jordan	D	1–1	Dasharath Rangasala, Kathmandu, Nepal	2014 FIFA World Cup qualification – AFC second round	Bharat Khawas	
11 October 2011	Philippines	L	0–4	Rizal Memorial Stadium, Manila, Philippines	International friendly		
2 December 2011	Maldives	D	1–1	Jawaharlal Nehru Stadium, New Delhi, India	2011 SAFF Championship	Sandip Rai	
4 December 2011	Bangladesh	W	1–0	Jawaharlal Nehru Stadium, New Delhi, India	2011 SAFF Championship	Sagar Thapa	
6 December 2011	Pakistan	D	1–1	Jawaharlal Nehru Stadium, New Delhi, India	2011 SAFF Championship	Bharat Khawas	
9 December 2011	Afghanistan	L	0–1	Jawaharlal Nehru Stadium, New Delhi, India	2011 SAFF Championship		

=== 2012 ===
Date	Opponent	Result	Score*	Venue	Competition	Nepal scorers	Refs.
8 March 2012	Palestine	L	0–2	Dasharath Rangasala, Kathmandu, Nepal	2012 AFC Challenge Cup		
10 March 2012	Maldives	L	0–1	Dasharath Rangasala, Kathmandu, Nepal	2012 AFC Challenge Cup		
12 March 2012	Turkmenistan	L	0–3	Dasharath Rangasala, Kathmandu, Nepal	2012 AFC Challenge Cup		
23 August 2012	Maldives	L	1–2	Jawaharlal Nehru Stadium, New Delhi, India	2012 Nehru Cup	Ju Manu Rai	
28 August 2012	India	D	0–0	Jawaharlal Nehru Stadium, New Delhi, India	2012 Nehru Cup		
30 August 2012	Syria	L	0–2	Jawaharlal Nehru Stadium, New Delhi, India	2012 Nehru Cup		
20 September 2012	Bangladesh	D	1–1	Dasharath Rangasala, Kathmandu, Nepal	International friendly	Bhola Nath Silwal	

=== 2013 ===
Date	Opponent	Result	Score*	Venue	Competition	Nepal scorers	Refs.
6 February 2013	Pakistan	L	0–1	Dasharath Rangasala, Kathmandu, Nepal	International friendly		
9 February 2013	Pakistan	L	0–1	Dasharath Rangasala, Kathmandu, Nepal	International friendly		
2 March 2013	Northern Mariana Islands	W	6–0	Dasharath Rangasala, Kathmandu, Nepal	2014 AFC Challenge Cup Qualifiers	Bharat Khawas (3); Santosh Sahukhala; Raju Tamang; Sandip Rai	
4 March 2013	Bangladesh	L	0–2	Dasharath Rangasala, Kathmandu, Nepal	2014 AFC Challenge Cup Qualifiers		
6 March 2013	Palestine	D	0–0	Dasharath Rangasala, Kathmandu, Nepal	2014 AFC Challenge Cup Qualifiers		
31 August 2013	Bangladesh	W	2–0	Dasharath Rangasala, Kathmandu, Nepal	2013 SAFF Championship	Anil Gurung; Bharat Khawas	
3 September 2013	Pakistan	D	1–1	Dasharath Rangasala, Kathmandu, Nepal	2013 SAFF Championship	Bimal Gharti Magar	
5 September 2013	India	W	2–1	Dasharath Rangasala, Kathmandu, Nepal	2013 SAFF Championship	Anil Gurung; Ju Manu Rai	
8 September 2013	Afghanistan	L	0–1	Dasharath Rangasala, Kathmandu, Nepal	2013 SAFF Championships		
19 November 2013	India	L	0–2	Kanchenjunga Stadium, Siliguri, India	International friendly		

=== 2014 ===
Date	Opponent	Result	Score*	Venue	Competition	Nepal scorers	Refs.
25 March 2014	Yemen	L	0–2	Grand Hamad Stadium, Doha, Qatar	International friendly		
11 April 2014	Philippines	L	0–3	Grand Hamad Stadium, Doha, Qatar	International friendly		
25 June 2014	Indonesia	L	0–2	Gajayana Stadium, Malang, Indonesia	International friendly		
31 October 2014	Philippines	L	0–3	Grand Hamad Stadium, Doha, Qatar	International friendly		

=== 2015 ===
Date	Opponent	Result	Score*	Venue	Competition	Nepal scorers	Refs.
12 March 2015	India	L	0–2	Indira Gandhi Athletic Stadium, Guwahati, India	2018 FIFA World Cup qualification (AFC)		
17 March 2015	India	D	0–0	Dasharath Rangasala, Kathmandu, Nepal	2018 FIFA World Cup qualification (AFC)		
31 August 2015	India	D	0–0	Shree Shiv Chhatrapati Sports Complex, Pune, India	International friendly		
17 December 2015	Bangladesh	L	0–1	Bangabandhu National Stadium, Dhaka, Bangladesh	International friendly		
23 December 2015	Sri Lanka	L	0–1	Trivandrum International Stadium, Trivandrum, India	2015 SAFF Championship		
27 December 2015	India	L	1–4	Trivandrum International Stadium, Trivandrum, India	2015 SAFF Championship	Bimal Gharti Magar	

=== 2016 ===
Date	Opponent	Result	Score*	Venue	Competition	Nepal scorers	Refs.
13 January 2016	Sri Lanka	W	1–0	Bangabandhu National Stadium, Dhaka, Bangladesh	2016 Bangabandhu Cup	Bimal Gharti Magar	
15 January 2016	Bangladesh	D	0–0	Bangabandhu National Stadium, Dhaka, Bangladesh	2016 Bangabandhu Cup		
19 January 2016	Maldives	W	4–1	Bangabandhu National Stadium, Dhaka, Bangladesh	2016 Bangabandhu Cup	Nawayug Shrestha (3); Bishal Rai	
29 May 2016	Laos	D	1–1	New Laos National Stadium, Vientiane, Laos	International friendly	Bishal Rai	
5 November 2016	Timor-Leste	D	0–0	Sarawak State Stadium, Kuching, Malaysia	2016 AFC Solidarity Cup		
8 November 2016	Brunei	W	3–0	Sarawak Stadium, Kuching, Malaysia	2016 AFC Solidarity Cup	Nawayug Shrestha; Bharat Khawas; Bimal Gharti Magar	
12 November 2016	Laos	W	2–2; 3–0 (p)	Sarawak State Stadium, Kuching, Malaysia	2016 AFC Solidarity Cup	Bimal Gharti Magar; Ananta Tamang	
15 November 2016	Macau	W	1–0	Sarawak Stadium, Kuching, Malaysia	2016 AFC Solidarity Cup (final)	Sujal Shrestha	

=== 2017 ===
Date	Opponent	Result	Score*	Venue	Competition	Nepal scorers	Refs.
28 March 2017	Philippines	L	1–4	Rizal Memorial Stadium, Manila, Philippines	2019 AFC Asian Cup qualification – third round	Bishal Rai	
6 June 2017	India	L	0–2	Andheri Sports Complex, Mumbai, India	International friendly		
13 June 2017	Yemen	D	0–0	Halchowk Stadium, Kathmandu, Nepal	2019 AFC Asian Cup qualification – third round		
5 September 2017	Tajikistan	L	1–2	Dasharath Rangasala, Kathmandu, Nepal	2019 AFC Asian Cup qualification – third round	Bimal Gharti Magar	
10 October 2017	Tajikistan	L	0–3	Pamir Stadium, Dushanbe, Tajikistan	2019 AFC Asian Cup qualification – third round		
14 November 2017	Philippines	D	0–0	ANFA Complex, Lalitpur, Nepal	2019 AFC Asian Cup qualification – third round		

=== 2018 ===
Date	Opponent	Result	Score*	Venue	Competition	Nepal scorers	Refs.
27 March 2018	Yemen	L	1–2	Suheim Bin Hamad Stadium, Doha, Qatar	2019 AFC Asian Cup qualification – third round	Nawayug Shrestha	
4 September 2018	Pakistan	L	1–2	Bangabandhu National Stadium, Dhaka, Bangladesh	2018 SAFF Championship	Bimal Gharti Magar	
6 September 2018	Bhutan	W	4–0	Bangabandhu National Stadium, Dhaka, Bangladesh	2018 SAFF Championship	Ananta Tamang; Sunil Bal; Bharat Khawas; Nirajan Khadka	
8 September 2018	Bangladesh	W	2–0	Bangabandhu National Stadium, Dhaka, Bangladesh	2018 SAFF Championship	Bimal Gharti Magar; Nawayug Shrestha	
12 September 2018	Maldives	L	0–3	Bangabandhu National Stadium, Dhaka, Bangladesh	2018 SAFF Championship		
2 October 2018	Tajikistan	L	0–2	Sylhet District Stadium, Sylhet, Bangladesh	2018 Bangabandhu Cup		
6 October 2018	Palestine	L	0–1	Sylhet District Stadium, Sylhet, Bangladesh	2018 Bangabandhu Cup		

=== 2019 ===
Date	Opponent	Result	Score*	Venue	Competition	Nepal scorers	Refs.
21 March 2019	Kuwait	D	0–0	Al-Ahmadi Stadium, Al Ahmadi, Kuwait	International friendly		
25 March 2019	Kuwait	L	0–1	Al-Ahmadi Stadium, Al Ahmadi, Kuwait	International friendly		
2 June 2019	Malaysia	L	0–2	Bukit Jalil National Stadium, Kuala Lumpur, Malaysia	International friendly		
6 June 2019	Chinese Taipei	D	1–1	National Stadium, Kaohsiung, Taiwan	International friendly	Abhishek Rijal	
5 September 2019	Kuwait	L	0–7	Jaber Al-Ahmad International Stadium, Kuwait City, Kuwait	2022 FIFA World Cup qualification		
10 September 2019	Chinese Taipei	W	2–0	Taipei Municipal Stadium, Taipei, Taiwan	2022 FIFA World Cup qualification	Anjan Bista (2)	
10 October 2019	Australia	L	0–5	(Australia) Canberra Stadium, Canberra	2022 FIFA World Cup qualification		
15 October 2019	Jordan	L	0–3	(Jordan) Amman International Stadium, Amman	2022 FIFA World Cup qualification		
7 November 2019	Myanmar	L	0–3	(Myanmar) Mandalarthiri Stadium, Mandalay	International friendly		
19 November 2019	Kuwait	L	0–1	(Bhutan) Changlimithang Stadium, Thimphu (Note: Match played on neutral ground due to the unavailability of appropriate stadium in Nepal.)	2022 FIFA World Cup qualification		

=== 2020 ===
Date	Opponent	Result	Score*	Venue	Competition	Nepal scorers	Refs.
13 November 2020	Bangladesh	L	0–2	(Bangladesh) Bangabandhu National Stadium, Dhaka	International friendly		
17 November 2020	Bangladesh	D	0–0	(Bangladesh) Bangabandhu National Stadium, Dhaka	International friendly		

=== 2021 ===
Date	Opponent	Result	Score*	Venue	Competition	Nepal scorers	Refs.
27 March 2021	Bangladesh	D	0–0	(Nepal) Dasharath Rangasala, Kathmandu	2021 Three Nations Cup		
29 March 2021	Bangladesh	W	2–1	(Nepal) Dasharath Rangasala, Kathmandu	2021 Three Nations Cup (final)	Sanjog Rai; Bishal Rai	
29 May 2021	Iraq	L	2–6	(Iraq) Basra International Stadium, Basra	International friendly	Anjan Bista; Manish Dangi	
3 June 2021	Chinese Taipei	W	2–0	Al Kuwait Sports Club Stadium, Kuwait City	2022 FIFA World Cup qualification	Anjan Bista (2)	
7 June 2021	Jordan	L	0–3	Al Kuwait Sports Club Stadium, Kuwait City	2022 FIFA World Cup qualification		
11 June 2021	Australia	L	0–3	Al Kuwait Sports Club Stadium, Kuwait City	2022 FIFA World Cup qualification		
2 September 2021	India	D	1–1	(Nepal) Dasharath Rangasala, Kathmandu	International friendly	Anjan Bista	
5 September 2021	India	L	1–2	(Nepal) Dasharath Rangasala, Kathmandu	International friendly	Tej Tamang	
26 September 2021	Oman	L	2–7	Qatar University Stadium, Doha	International friendly	Ananta Tamang; Ayush Ghalan	
1 October 2021	Maldives	W	1–0	National Football Stadium (Maldives), Malé	2021 SAFF Championship	Manish Dangi	
4 October 2021	Sri Lanka	W	3–2	National Football Stadium (Maldives), Malé	2021 SAFF Championship	Suman Lama; Anjan Bista; Ayush Ghalan	
10 October 2021	India	L	0–1	National Football Stadium (Maldives), Malé	2021 SAFF Championship		
13 October 2021	Bangladesh	D	1–1	National Football Stadium (Maldives), Malé	2021 SAFF Championship	Anjan Bista	
16 October 2021	India	L	0–3	National Football Stadium (Maldives), Malé	2021 SAFF Championship (final)		

=== 2022 ===
Date	Opponent	Result	Score*	Venue	Competition	Nepal scorers	Refs.
29 January 2022	Mauritius	W	1–0	(Nepal) Dasharath Rangasala, Kathmandu	International friendly	Bimal Gharti Magar	
1 February 2022	Mauritius	W	1–0	(Nepal) Dasharath Rangasala, Kathmandu	International friendly	Sujal Shrestha	
24 March 2022	Thailand	L	0–2	(Thailand) Chonburi Stadium, Chonburi	International friendly		
31 May 2022	Sri Lanka	D	1–1	Grand Hamad Stadium, Qatar	International friendly	Nawayug Shrestha	
3 June 2022	Oman	L	0–2	(Qatar) Suheim bin Hamad Stadium, Doha	International friendly		
8 June 2022	Jordan	L	0–2	Jaber Al-Ahmad International Stadium, Kuwait City	2023 AFC Asian Cup qualification – third round		
11 June 2022	Kuwait	L	1–4	Jaber Al-Ahmad International Stadium, Kuwait City	2023 AFC Asian Cup qualification – third round	Darshan Gurung	
14 June 2022	Indonesia	L	0–7	Jaber Al-Ahmad International Stadium, Kuwait City	2023 AFC Asian Cup qualification – third round		
27 September 2022	Bangladesh	W	3–1	(Nepal) Dasharath Rangasala, Kathmandu	International friendly	Anjan Bista (3)	
16 November 2022	Pakistan	W	1–0	(Nepal) Dasharath Rangasala, Kathmandu	International friendly	Anjan Bista	

=== 2023 ===
Date	Opponent	Result	Score*	Venue	Competition	Nepal scorers	Refs.
22 March 2023	Laos	W	2–0	Dasharath Rangasala, Kathmandu	Three nation prime minister cup	Ananta Tamang; Nawayug Shrestha	
28 March 2023	Bhutan	D	1–1	Dasharath Rangasala, Kathmandu	Three nation prime minister cup	Dipak Raj Singh Thakuri	
31 March 2023	Laos	W	2–1	Dasharath Rangasala, Kathmandu	Three nation prime minister cup	Ayush Ghalan; Manish Dangi	
15 June 2023	Philippines	L	0–1	Rizal Memorial Stadium, Manila	International Friendly		
21 June 2023	Kuwait	L	1–3	Sree Kanteerava Stadium, Bangalore	2023 SAFF Championship	Anjan Bista	
24 June 2023	India	L	0–2	Sree Kanteerava Stadium, Bangalore	2023 SAFF Championship		
27 June 2023	Pakistan	W	1–0	Sree Kanteerava Stadium, Bangalore	2023 SAFF Championship	Aashish Chaudhary	
8 September 2023	Myanmar	D	0–0	Thuwunna Stadium, Yangon	International Friendly		
11 September 2023	Myanmar	L	0–1	Thuwunna Stadium, Yangon	International Friendly		
12 October 2023	Laos	D	1–1	Dasharath Rangasala, Kathmandu	2026 World Cup Qualification	Anjan Bista	
17 October 2023	Laos	W	1–0	New Laos National Stadium, Vientiane	2026 World Cup Qualification	Manish Dangi	
16 November 2023	United Arab Emirates	L	0–4	Al Maktoum Stadium, Dubai	2026 World Cup Qualification		
21 November 2023	Yemen	L	0–2	Dasharath Rangasala, Kathmandu	2026 World Cup Qualification		

=== 2024 ===
Date	Opponent	Result	Score*	Venue	Competition	Nepal scorers	Refs.
15 March 2024	Malaysia	L	1–5	UiTM Stadium, Shah Alam	Unofficial Friendly		
21 March 2024	Bahrain	L	0–5	Bahrain National Stadium, Riffa	2026 World Cup Qualification		
26 March 2024	Bahrain	L	0–3	Bahrain National Stadium, Riffa	2026 World Cup Qualification		
6 June 2024	United Arab Emirates	L	0–4	Prince Mohamed bin Fahd Stadium, Dammam	2026 World Cup Qualification		
11 June 2024	Yemen	D	2–2	Prince Mohamed bin Fahd Stadium, Dammam	2026 World Cup Qualification	Sanjeeb Bista; Gillespye Jung Karki	
13 November 2024	Tajikistan	L	0–4	Republican Central Stadium, Dushanbe	International Friendly		
16 November 2024	Afghanistan	W	2–0	Republican Central Stadium, Dushanbe	International Friendly	Gillespye Jung Karki; Rohit Chand	

=== 2025 ===
21 March 2025 Friendly	Singapore	0–1	Nepal	Kallang, Singapore
20:30 UTC+8		Report	Karki 12'	Stadium: National Stadium; Referee: Yusuke Ohashi (Japan)

25 March 2025 2027 ACQ R3	Malaysia	0–3; Awarded (Note: On 26 September 2025, FIFA sanctioned the Football Association of Malaysia and seven players for using falsified eligibility documents. One player, Hector Hevel played in the match against Nepal. On 5 March 2026, the CAS confirmed the penalties for which AFC overturned the game as a 3–0 victory for Nepal on 17 March 2026.)	Nepal	Johor, Malaysia
22:00 UTC+8	Hevel 29'; Ong 71'	Report; Report (AFC)		Stadium: Sultan Ibrahim Stadium; Attendance: 7,895; Referee: Hiroki Kasahara (Japan)

5 June 2025 Friendly	Hong Kong	0–0	Nepal	Kowloon, Hong Kong
20:00 UTC+8		Report		Stadium: Hong Kong Stadium; Attendance: 6,092; Referee: Wiwat Jumpaoon (Thailand)

10 June 2025 2027 ACQ R3	Laos	2–1	Nepal	Vientiane, Laos
19:00 UTC+7	Thongkhamsavath 13'; Phanthavong 49'	Report (AFC)	Dangi 73' (pen.)	Stadium: New Laos National Stadium; Attendance: 5,123; Referee: Nivon Robesh (Sri Lanka)

6 September 2025 Friendly	Nepal	0–0	Bangladesh	Kathmandu, Nepal
17:30 UTC+5:45				Stadium: Dasharath Rangasala; Referee: Ugyen Penjor (Bhutan)

9 October 2025 2027 ACQ R3	Vietnam	3–1	Nepal	Ho Chi Minh City, Vietnam
19:30 UTC+7	Nguyễn Tiến Linh 9'; Phạm Xuân Mạnh 67'; Nguyễn Văn Vĩ 72'	Report (AFC)	Sanish 17'	Stadium: Gò Đậu Stadium; Attendance: 8,597; Referee: Choi Hyun-jai (South Korea)

14 October 2025 2027 ACQ R3	Nepal	0–1	Vietnam	Ho Chi Minh City, Vietnam (Note: Stadiums in Nepal do not meet AFC requirements, thus Nepal are required to play their home matches at a neutral venue.)
20:00 UTC+7 (Note: Match time was previously 19:30, but due to rain in Ho Chi Minh City, it was delayed for 30 minutes)		Report (AFC)	Suman 5' (o.g.)	Stadium: Thống Nhất Stadium; Attendance: 6,870; Referee: Mohamed Khaled (Bahrain)

13 November 2025 Friendly	Bangladesh	2–2	Nepal	Dhaka, Bangladesh
20:00 UTC+6	Hamza 46', 50' (pen.)	Report	R. Chand 29'; A. Tamang 90+3'	Stadium: National Stadium; Referee: Kasun Lakmal Weerakkody (Sri Lanka)

18 November 2025 2027 ACQ R3	Nepal	0–1	Malaysia	Kuala Lumpur, Malaysia
21:00 UTC+8		Report (AFC)	Faisal 56'	Stadium: Bukit Jalil National Stadium; Attendance: 14,243; Referee: Kim Dae-yong (South Korea)

=== 2026 ===
31 March 2026 2027 ACQ R3	Nepal	0–1	Laos	Vientiane, Laos
19:00 UTC+7		Report; Report (AFC)	Bounphachan 48'	Stadium: New Laos National Stadium; Attendance: 2,327; Referee: Ahmad A'Qashah (Singapore)

== See also ==
- Nepal women's national football team results
