= Bangladesh national football team results (1973–1999) =

Match results (1973–1999)

This article lists the results of the Bangladesh national football team between 1973 and 1999.

== Results ==
Key
Win
Draw
Defeat

=== 1973 ===
Date	Opponent	Score	Venue	Competition	Scorers
27 July 1973	Thailand	2–2; 5–6(pen.)	Stadium Merdeka, Kuala Lumpur, Malaysia	1973 Merdeka Tournament	Enayetur Rahman 61'; Kazi Salahuddin 88'
29 July 1973	South Vietnam	1–1	Stadium Merdeka, Kuala Lumpur, Malaysia	1973 Merdeka Tournament	Monwar Hossain Nannu 50'
31 July 1973	Kuwait	1–2	Stadium Merdeka, Kuala Lumpur, Malaysia	1973 Merdeka Tournament	Enayetur Rahman 47'
2 August 1973	Singapore	1–1	Stadium Merdeka, Kuala Lumpur, Malaysia	1973 Merdeka Tournament	Kazi Salahuddin 6'
8 August 1973	Burma	0–6	Stadium Merdeka, Kuala Lumpur, Malaysia	1973 Merdeka Tournament	
12 August 1973	Thailand	0–2	Stadium Merdeka, Kuala Lumpur, Malaysia	1973 Merdeka Tournament	
13 August 1973	Singapore	1–0	National Stadium, Singapore	Friendly	AKM Nowsheruzzaman 69'

=== 1975 ===
Date	Opponent	Score	Venue	Competition	Scorers
29 July 1975	Indonesia	0–4	Stadium Merdeka, Kuala Lumpur, Malaysia	1975 Merdeka Tournament	
2 August 1975	Thailand	1–1	Stadium Merdeka, Kuala Lumpur, Malaysia	1975 Merdeka Tournament	Kazi Salahuddin 56'
4 August 1975	Japan	0–3	Stadium Merdeka, Kuala Lumpur, Malaysia	1975 Merdeka Tournament	
6 August 1975	Malaysia	0–3	Stadium Merdeka, Kuala Lumpur, Malaysia	1975 Merdeka Tournament	
8 August 1973	Burma	1–7	Stadium Merdeka, Kuala Lumpur, Malaysia	1975 Merdeka Tournament	Kazi Salahuddin 67'
10 August 1975	Hong Kong	1–9	Stadium Merdeka, Kuala Lumpur, Malaysia	1975 Merdeka Tournament	Kazi Salahuddin 85'
15 August 1975	South Korea	0–4	Stadium Merdeka, Kuala Lumpur, Malaysia	1975 Merdeka Tournament	

=== 1976 ===
Date	Opponent	Score	Venue	Competition	Scorers
18 December 1976	Malaysia	0–6	Bangkok, Thailand	1976 King's Cup	

=== 1978 ===
Date	Opponent	Score	Venue	Competition	Scorers
12 December 1978	Malaysia	0–1	Bangkok, Thailand	1978 Asian Games	
14 December 1978	India	0–3	Bangkok, Thailand	1978 Asian Games	

=== 1979 ===
Date	Opponent	Score	Venue	Competition	Scorers
1 March 1979	Afghanistan	2–2	Dhaka Stadium, Dhaka, Bangladesh	1980 AFC Asian Cup qualification	Mohammad Abdul Halim 34', 48'
3 March 1979	Qatar	1–1	Dhaka Stadium, Dhaka, Bangladesh	1980 AFC Asian Cup qualification	Mohammed Mohsin 23'
5 March 1979	Afghanistan	3–2	Dhaka Stadium, Dhaka, Bangladesh	1980 AFC Asian Cup qualification	Ashrafuddin Ahmed Chunnu 50'; Mohammad Abdul Halim 53'; Kazi Salahuddin 90'
7 March 1979	Qatar	1–3	Dhaka Stadium, Dhaka, Bangladesh	1980 AFC Asian Cup qualification	Kazi Salahuddin 44'
8 September 1979	Bahrain	0–2	Dongdaemun Stadium, Seoul, South Korea	1979 President's Cup	
10 September 1979	Sudan	1–4	Dongdaemun Stadium, Seoul, South Korea	1979 President's Cup	Ashrafuddin Ahmed Chunnu 66'
14 September 1979	Sri Lanka	3–1	Dongdaemun Stadium, Seoul, South Korea	1979 President's Cup	Ashrafuddin Ahmed Chunnu (?); Sheikh Mohammad Aslam (?); Mohammad Abu Yusuf (?)
16 September 1979	South Korea	0–9	Dongdaemun Stadium, Seoul, South Korea	1979 President's Cup	

=== 1980 ===
Date	Opponent	Score	Venue	Competition	Scorers
16 September 1980	North Korea	2–3	Sabah Al-Salem Stadium, Kuwait City, Kuwait	1980 AFC Asian Cup – Group A	Kazi Salahuddin 60' (pen.); Ashrafuddin Ahmed Chunnu 88'
19 September 1980	Syria	0–1	Sabah Al-Salem Stadium, Kuwait City, Kuwait	1980 AFC Asian Cup – Group A	
22 September 1980	Iran	0–7	Sabah Al-Salem Stadium, Kuwait City, Kuwait	1980 AFC Asian Cup – Group A	
25 September 1980	China	0–6	Sabah Al-Salem Stadium, Kuwait City, Kuwait	1980 AFC Asian Cup – Group A	

=== 1981 ===
Date	Opponent	Score	Venue	Competition	Scorers
31 March 1981	Nepal	1–1	Dhaka Stadium, Dhaka, Bangladesh	1981 President's Gold Cup	Kazi Salahuddin 34'

=== 1982 ===
Date	Opponent	Score	Venue	Competition	Scorers
16 February 1982	Nepal	1–1	National Stadium, Karachi, Pakistan	1982 Quaid-e-Azam International Tournament	Ashish Bhadra (?)
18 February 1982	Pakistan	1–2	National Stadium, Karachi, Pakistan	1982 Quaid-e-Azam International Tournament	Khandoker Wasim Iqbal (?)
19 February 1982	Oman	1–3	National Stadium, Karachi, Pakistan	1982 Quaid-e-Azam International Tournament	Ashrafuddin Ahmed Chunnu (?)
23 February 1982	Iran	0–9	National Stadium, Karachi, Pakistan	1982 Quaid-e-Azam International Tournament	
20 November 1982	India	0–2	(India) Jawaharlal Nehru Stadium, New Delhi	1982 Asian Games – Group C	
22 November 1982	China	0–1	(India) Jawaharlal Nehru Stadium, New Delhi	1982 Asian Games – Group C	
24 November 1982	Malaysia	2–1	(India) New Delhi	1982 Asian Games – Group C	Ashish Bhadra 17'; Badal Roy 75'

=== 1983 ===
Date	Opponent	Score	Venue	Competition	Scorers
29 August 1983	Thailand	0–0	Dhaka Stadium, Dhaka, Bangladesh	1983 President's Gold Cup	
4 September 1983	Nepal	4–2	Dhaka Stadium, Dhaka, Bangladesh	1983 President's Gold Cup	Sheikh Mohammad Aslam (?); Ashrafuddin Ahmed Chunnu 34', 44', 73'
22 September 1983	Nepal	1–0	Seremban, Malaysia	1983 Merdeka Tournament	Ashish Bhadra 33'
28 September 1983	Malaysia	0–1	Stadium Merdeka, Kuala Lumpur, Malaysia	1983 Merdeka Tournament	

=== 1984 ===
Date	Opponent	Score	Venue	Competition	Scorers
7 August 1984	Iran	0–5	Senayan Stadium, Jakarta, Indonesia	1984 AFC Asian Cup qualification	
9 August 1984	Indonesia	1–2	Senayan Stadium, Jakarta, Indonesia	1984 AFC Asian Cup qualification	Sheikh Mohammad Aslam 89'
11 August 1984	Syria	1–2	Senayan Stadium, Jakarta, Indonesia	1984 AFC Asian Cup qualification	Kazi Jasimuddin Ahmed Joshi 44'
13 August 1984	Philippines	3–2	Sriwedari Stadium, Solo, Indonesia	1984 AFC Asian Cup qualification	Khandoker Wasim Iqbal 8', 49'; Sheikh Mohammad Aslam 42'
15 August 1984	Thailand	1–2	Sriwedari Stadium, Solo, Indonesia	1984 AFC Asian Cup qualification	Sheikh Mohammad Aslam 23'
18 September 1984	Bhutan	2–0	Dasharath Stadium, Kathmandu, Nepal	1984 South Asian Games – Group Stage	Sheikh Mohammad Aslam 13'; Ashrafuddin Ahmed Chunnu 43'
19 September 1984	Maldives	5–0	Dasharath Stadium, Kathmandu, Nepal	1984 South Asian Games – Group Stage	Ashrafuddin Ahmed Chunnu 2', 72'; Sheikh Mohammad Aslam 18', 85'; Samrat Hossain Emily 36'
21 September 1984	Nepal	5–0	Dasharath Stadium, Kathmandu, Nepal	1984 South Asian Games – Group Stage	Khandoker Wasim Iqbal (?); Arif Abdul Khalek (?); Sheikh Mohammad Sohel (?)
23 September 1984	Nepal	2–4	Dasharath Stadium, Kathmandu, Nepal	1984 South Asian Games – Final	Ashrafuddin Ahmed Chunnu 35', 87'

=== 1985 ===
Date	Opponent	Score	Venue	Competition	Scorers
18 March 1985	Indonesia	0–2	Senayan Stadium, Jakarta, Indonesia	1986 FIFA World Cup qualification	
23 March 1985	Thailand	0–3	Suphachalasai Stadium, Bangkok, Thailand	1986 FIFA World Cup qualification	
30 March 1985	India	1–2	Dhaka Stadium, Dhaka, Bangladesh	1986 FIFA World Cup qualification	Ashrafuddin Ahmed Chunnu 42'
2 April 1985	Indonesia	2–1	Dhaka Stadium, Dhaka, Bangladesh	1986 FIFA World Cup qualification	Kaiser Hamid 75'; Ashrafuddin Ahmed Chunnu 81'
5 April 1985	Thailand	1–0	Dhaka Stadium, Dhaka, Bangladesh	1986 FIFA World Cup qualification	Elias Hossain 76'
12 April 1985	India	1–2	Salt Lake Stadium, Kolkata, India	1986 FIFA World Cup qualification	Ashish Bhadra 15'
28 April 1985	Indonesia	1–1	Qayyum Stadium, Peshwar, Pakistan	1985 Quaid-e-Azam International Tournament	Ashrafuddin Ahmed Chunnu 10'
2 May 1985	Pakistan	3–1	Qayyum Stadium, Peshwar, Pakistan	1985 Quaid-e-Azam International Tournament	Badal Roy 12'; Ashish Bhadra 41'; Ashrafuddin Ahmed Chunnu 88'
4 May 1985	North Korea	0–1	Qayyum Stadium, Peshwar, Pakistan	1985 Quaid-e-Azam International Tournament	
21 December 1985	Pakistan	2–1	Dhaka Stadium, Dhaka, Bangladesh	1985 South Asian Games – Group A	Mahfuzul Mamun Babu 27', 89'
23 December 1985	Maldives	8–0	Dhaka Stadium, Dhaka, Bangladesh	1985 South Asian Games – Group A	Elias Hossain 22'; Sheikh Mohammad Aslam 30', 78'; Kaiser Hamid 35', 75'; Khandoker Wasim Iqbal 53', 60'; Mahfuzul Mamun Babu 55'
25 December 1985	India	1–1; 1–4(pen.)	Dhaka Stadium, Dhaka, Bangladesh	1985 South Asian Games – Final	Sheikh Mohammad Aslam 39'

=== 1986 ===
Date	Opponent	Score	Venue	Competition	Scorers
15 March 1986	Pakistan	1–0	National Stadium, Karachi, Pakistan	1986 Pakistan President's Gold Cup	Shahinur Kabir Shimul 85'
20 September 1986	Kuwait	0–4	Daejeon Stadium, Daejeon, South Korea	1986 Asian Games – Group D	
24 September 1986	Iran	0–4	Daejeon Stadium, Daejeon, South Korea	1986 Asian Games – Group D	
26 September 1986	Nepal	1–0	Daejeon Stadium, Daejeon, South Korea	1986 Asian Games – Group D	Sheikh Mohammad Aslam 48'
28 September 1986	Japan	0–4	Daejeon Stadium, Daejeon, South Korea	1986 Asian Games – Group D	
4 December 1986	Nepal	0–1	Dasharath Rangasala, Kathmandu, Nepal	1986 Nepal Panchayat Silver Jubilee Cup	
7 December 1986	Singapore	1–1	Dasharath Rangasala, Kathmandu, Nepal	1986 Nepal Panchayat Silver Jubilee Cup	Monir Hossain Manu (?)

=== 1987 ===
Date	Opponent	Score	Venue	Competition	Scorers
8 February 1987	Thailand	2–2	Dhaka Stadium, Dhaka, Bangladesh	1987 President's Gold Cup	Badal Das 83'; Samrat Hossain Emily 85'
21 November 1987	Nepal	0–1	Salt Lake Stadium, Calcutta, India	1987 South Asian Games – Group B	
22 November 1987	Bhutan	3–0	Salt Lake Stadium, Calcutta, India	1987 South Asian Games – Group B	Khurshid Alam Babul 7'; Badal Das 77'; Ahmed Ali 81'
25 November 1987	Pakistan	0–1	Salt Lake Stadium, Calcutta, India	1987 South Asian Games – Third place	

=== 1988 ===
Date	Opponent	Score	Venue	Competition	Scorers
6 February 1988	India	0–0	(United Arab Emirates) Abu Dhabi, UAE	1988 AFC Asian Cup qualification	
8 February 1988	China	0–4	(United Arab Emirates) Abu Dhabi, UAE	1988 AFC Asian Cup qualification	
12 February 1988	Thailand	1–1	(United Arab Emirates) Abu Dhabi, UAE	1988 AFC Asian Cup qualification	Ahmed Ali 44'
14 February 1988	North Yemen	0–0	(United Arab Emirates) Abu Dhabi, UAE	1988 AFC Asian Cup qualification	
17 February 1988	United Arab Emirates	0–4	(United Arab Emirates) Abu Dhabi, UAE	1988 AFC Asian Cup qualification	

=== 1989 ===
Date	Opponent	Score	Venue	Competition	Scorers
19 February 1989	Thailand	0–1	National Stadium, Bangkok, Thailand	1990 FIFA World Cup qualification	
23 February 1989	China	0–2	Tianhe Stadium, Guangzhou, China	1990 FIFA World Cup qualification	
27 February 1989	Iran	1–2	Dhaka Stadium, Dhaka, Bangladesh	1990 FIFA World Cup qualification	Sheikh Mohammad Aslam 70'
4 March 1989	China	0–2	Dhaka Stadium, Dhaka, Bangladesh	1990 FIFA World Cup qualification	
8 March 1989	Thailand	3–1	Dhaka Stadium, Dhaka, Bangladesh	1990 FIFA World Cup qualification	Khandoker Wasim Iqbal 10'; Rumman Bin Wali Sabbir 28'; Satyajit Das Rupu 76'
17 March 1989	Iran	0–1	Azadi Stadium, Tehran, Iran	1990 FIFA World Cup qualification	
21 October 1989	Sri Lanka	3–0	Jinnah Sports Stadium, Islamabad, Pakistan	1989 South Asian Games – Group A	Rizvi Karim Rumi 19', 72'; Rumman Bin Wali Sabbir 79'
23 October 1989	India	1–1	Jinnah Sports Stadium, Islamabad, Pakistan	1989 South Asian Games – Group A	Nurul Haque Manik 34'
26 October 1989	Pakistan	0–1	Jinnah Sports Stadium, Islamabad, Pakistan	1989 South Asian Games – Final	

=== 1990 ===
Date	Opponent	Score	Venue	Competition	Scorers
24 September 1990	Saudi Arabia	0–4	Xiannongtan Stadium, Beijing, China	1990 Asian Games – Group D	
26 September 1990	Japan	0–3	Fengtai Stadium, Beijing, China	1990 Asian Games – Group D	

=== 1991 ===
Date	Opponent	Score	Venue	Competition	Scorers
24 December 1991	Pakistan	0–1	Sugathadasa Stadium, Colombo, Sri Lanka	1991 South Asian Games – Group A	
26 December 1991	India	2–1	Sugathadasa Stadium, Colombo, Sri Lanka	1991 South Asian Games – Group A	Rizvi Karim Rumi 20', 75'
28 December 1991	Nepal	2–0	Sugathadasa Stadium, Colombo, Sri Lanka	1991 South Asian Games – Third place	Mamun Joarder 44'; Sheikh Mohammad Aslam 65'

=== 1992 ===
Date	Opponent	Score	Venue	Competition	Scorers
19 June 1992	South Korea	0–6	Bangkok, Thailand	1992 AFC Asian Cup qualification	
23 June 1992	Thailand	0–1	Bangkok, Thailand	1992 AFC Asian Cup qualification	

=== 1993 ===
Date	Opponent	Score	Venue	Competition	Scorers
11 April 1993	Japan	0–8	Tokyo National Stadium, Tokyo, Japan	1994 FIFA World Cup qualification	
13 April 1993	Sri Lanka	1–0	Nippatsu Mitsuzawa Stadium, Yokohama, Japan	1994 FIFA World Cup qualification	Rizvi Karim Rumi 69'
15 April 1993	United Arab Emirates	0–1	Nippatsu Mitsuzawa Stadium, Yokohama, Japan	1994 FIFA World Cup qualification	
18 April 1993	Thailand	1–4	Tokyo National Stadium, Tokyo, Japan	1994 FIFA World Cup qualification	Mamun Joarder 84'
30 April 1993	Japan	1–4	Tokyo National Stadium, Tokyo, Japan	1994 FIFA World Cup qualification	Rizvi Karim Rumi 11'
3 May 1993	United Arab Emirates	0–7	(United Arab Emirates) Tahnoun bin Mohammed Stadium, Al Ain, UAE	1994 FIFA World Cup qualification	
5 May 1993	Thailand	4–1	(United Arab Emirates) Al Maktoum Stadium, Dubai, UAE	1994 FIFA World Cup qualification	Rumman Bin Wali Sabbir 72'
7 May 1993	Sri Lanka	3–0	(United Arab Emirates) Al Maktoum Stadium, Dubai, UAE	1994 FIFA World Cup qualification	Mamun Joarder 8', 78'; Kaiser Hamid 73' (pen.)
10 December 1993	Myanmar	3–1	Mirpur Stadium, Dhaka, Bangladesh	Friendly	Monem Munna (?); Imtiaz Ahmed Nakib (?)
13 December 1993	Myanmar	3–1	Mirpur Stadium, Dhaka, Bangladesh	Friendly	Kaiser Hamid 42' (pen.); Mamun Joarder 46'; Rumman Bin Wali Sabbir (?)
20 December 1993	Maldives	0–0	Mirpur Stadium, Dhaka, Bangladesh	1993 South Asian Games – Group A	
22 December 1993	Nepal	0–1	Dhaka Stadium, Dhaka, Bangladesh	1993 South Asian Games – Group A	

=== 1994 ===
Due to limited preparation time, the BFF sent Muktijoddha Sangsad KC to represent the national team in the Qatar Independence Cup. The team, coached by the club's head coach Kazi Salahuddin, included 17 club players and 2 guests from Brothers Union, wearing the club's jersey and logo throughout the tournament.

Date	Opponent	Score	Venue	Competition	Scorers
14 September 1994	India	2–4	Khalifa International Stadium, Doha, Qatar	1994 Qatar Independence Cup	Imtiaz Ahmed Nakib 63', 74'
16 September 1994	Yemen	1–0	Khalifa International Stadium, Doha, Qatar	1994 Qatar Independence Cup	Mizanur Rahman Mizan 53'

=== 1995 ===
Date	Opponent	Score	Venue	Competition	Scorers
25 March 1995	Pakistan	1–0	Sugathadasa Stadium, Colombo, Sri Lanka	1995 South Asian Gold Cup – Group A	
27 March 1995	Nepal	2–0	Sugathadasa Stadium, Colombo, Sri Lanka	1995 South Asian Gold Cup – Group A	Mizanur Rahman Mizan 8'; Rakib Hossain 26'
31 March 1995	India	0–0; 2–4(pen.)	Sugathadasa Stadium, Colombo, Sri Lanka	1995 South Asian Gold Cup – Semi-finals	
26 October 1995	Myanmar	0–4	Thuwunna Stadium, Yangon, Myanmar	4-nation Tiger Trophy	
1 November 1995	Sri Lanka	1–0	Thuwunna Stadium, Yangon, Myanmar	4-nation Tiger Trophy	Mizanur Rahman Mizan 22'
4 November 1995	Myanmar	2–1	Thuwunna Stadium, Yangon, Myanmar	4-nation Tiger Trophy	Mamun Joarder 18'; Imtiaz Ahmed Nakib 49'
21 December 1995	Maldives	0–0	Jawaharlal Nehru Stadium, Madras, India	1995 South Asian Games – Group B	
23 December 1995	Nepal	2–1	Jawaharlal Nehru Stadium, Madras, India	1995 South Asian Games – Group B	Rakib Hossain 16'; Mamun Joarder 26'
25 December 1995	Sri Lanka	0–0; 4–3(pen.)	Jawaharlal Nehru Stadium, Madras, India	1995 South Asian Games – Semi-finals	
27 December 1995	India	0–1	Jawaharlal Nehru Stadium, Madras, India	1995 South Asian Games – Final	

=== 1997 ===
Date	Opponent	Score	Venue	Competition	Scorers
16 March 1997	Malaysia	0–2	Shah Alam Stadium, Shah Alam, Malaysia	1998 FIFA World Cup qualification	
18 March 1997	Chinese Taipei	1–3	Shah Alam Stadium, Shah Alam, Malaysia	1998 FIFA World Cup qualification	Jewel Rana 56'
20 March 1997	Saudi Arabia	1–4	Shah Alam Stadium, Shah Alam, Malaysia	1998 FIFA World Cup qualification	Jewel Rana 44'
27 March 1997	Saudi Arabia	3–0	Youth Welfare, Jeddah, Saudi Arabia	1998 FIFA World Cup qualification	
29 March 1997	Chinese Taipei	2–1	Youth Welfare, Jeddah, Saudi Arabia	1998 FIFA World Cup qualification	Alfaz Ahmed 45'; Imtiaz Ahmed Nakib 81'
31 March 1997	Malaysia	0–1	Youth Welfare, Jeddah, Saudi Arabia	1998 FIFA World Cup qualification	
31 August 1997	Myanmar	2–2	Thuwunna Stadium, Yangon, Myanmar	Friendly	Alfaz Ahmed 23'; Arman Mia 81'
5 September 1997	Maldives	1–1	Dasarath Stadium, Kathmandu, Nepal	1997 SAFF Gold Cup – Group B	Imtiaz Ahmed Nakib 53'
7 September 1997	India	0–3	Dasarath Stadium, Kathmandu, Nepal	1997 SAFF Gold Cup – Group B	

=== 1998 ===
Date	Opponent	Score	Venue	Competition	Scorers
31 July 1998	Qatar	0–0	Khalifa International Stadium, Doha, Qatar	Friendly	

=== 1999 ===
Date	Opponent	Score	Venue	Competition	Scorers
22 April 1999	India	0–0	Fatorda Stadium, Goa, India	1999 SAFF Gold Cup – Group A	
24 April 1999	Pakistan	4–0	Fatorda Stadium, Goa, India	1999 SAFF Gold Cup – Group A	Iqbal Hossain 7'; Alfaz Ahmed 33'; Mizanur Rahman Dawn 62', 65'
29 April 1999	Nepal	2–1	Fatorda Stadium, Goa, India	1999 SAFF Gold Cup – Semi-finals	Mizanur Rahman Dawn 5'; Alfaz Ahmed 62'
1 May 1999	India	0–2	Fatorda Stadium, Goa, India	1999 SAFF Gold Cup – Final	
27 September 1999	Maldives	1–2	Dasharath Stadium, Kathmandu, Nepal	1999 South Asian Games – Group A	Jewel Rana 90'
29 September 1999	Sri Lanka	1–0	Dasharath Stadium, Kathmandu, Nepal	1999 South Asian Games – Group A	Jewel Rana 34'
2 October 1999	India	1–0	Dasharath Stadium, Kathmandu, Nepal	1999 South Asian Games – Semi-finals	Shahajuddin Tipu 64'
4 October 1999	Nepal	1–0	Dasharath Stadium, Kathmandu, Nepal	1999 South Asian Games – Final	Alfaz Ahmed 44'
21 November 1999	Uzbekistan	0–6	(United Arab Emirates) Tahnoun bin Mohammed Stadium, Abu Dhabi, UAE	2000 AFC Asian Cup qualification	
23 November 1999	United Arab Emirates	0–3	(United Arab Emirates) Tahnoun bin Mohammed Stadium, Abu Dhabi, UAE	2000 AFC Asian Cup qualification	
25 November 1999	Sri Lanka	3–1	(United Arab Emirates) Tahnoun bin Mohammed Stadium, Abu Dhabi, UAE	2000 AFC Asian Cup qualification	Mizanur Rahman Dawn 37'; Motiur Rahman Munna 61' (pen.); Abu Ahmed Faysal 64'
29 November 1999	India	2–2	(United Arab Emirates) Tahnoun bin Mohammed Stadium, Abu Dhabi, UAE	2000 AFC Asian Cup qualification	Alfaz Ahmed 19', 49'
