= Alfaz Ahmed =

Bangladeshi association football player and manager

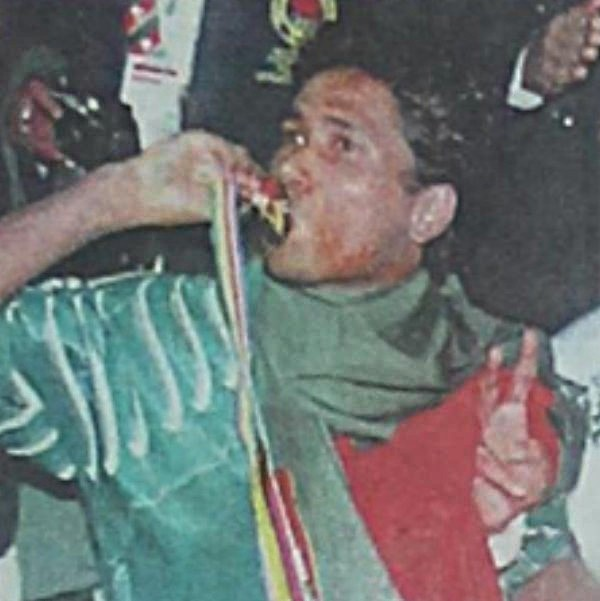
- Alfaz celebrating 1999 SA Games triumph

Personal information
- Full name: Mohammad Alfaz Ahmed
- Date of birth: 6 June 1973 (age 53)
- Place of birth: Sylhet, Bangladesh
- Height: 1.70 m (5 ft 7 in)
- Positions: Striker; attacking midfielder

Team information
- Current team: Mohammedan SC (head coach)

Youth career
- 1987: Orient Sporting

Senior career*
Years	Team	Apps	(Gls)
1988–1989	Lalbagh Sporting		
1991–1994	Rahmatganj MFS		
1994	Arambagh KS		
1995–2001	Mohammedan SC		
2000–2001	Mohun Bagan A.C.	6	(0)
2002–2003	Muktijoddha Sangsad		
2003–2004	Brothers Union		
2005–2006	Mohammedan SC		
2007	Muktijoddha Sangsad	20	(8)
2008–2009	Sheikh Russel KC	29	(16)
2009–2010	Arambagh KS	24	(12)
2010–2011	Dhaka Abahani		(0)
2012	Team BJMC		(1)
2012–2013	Mohammedan SC		(0)

International career
1994	Bangladesh U19	3	(1)
1995–2008	Bangladesh	62	(12)

Managerial career
- 2013–2014: Mohammedan SC (assistant)
- 2014: Mohammedan SC (caretaker)
- 2014–2017: Bangladesh Army
- 2019–2020: Uttar Baridhara
- 2020–2023: Mohammedan SC (assistant)
- 2023–: Mohammedan SC
Medal record
Men's football
Representing Bangladesh
South Asian Games
Gold medal – first place	1999 Kathmandu
SAFF Championship
Runner-up	1999 India
Winner	2003 Bangladesh
Runner-up	2005 Pakistan
- * Club domestic league appearances and goals

Alfaz Ahmed (Bengali: আলফাজ আহমেদ, Bengali pronunciation: [alfaz aɦmed]; born 6 June 1973) is a Bangladeshi football coach and former player who currently serves as the head coach of Bangladesh Football League club Mohammedan SC. He represented the Bangladesh national team from 1995 to 2008. He is seen as one of the best strikers to ever play for Bangladesh.

He won three international trophies while playing for his country. Alfaz scored the winning goal of the 1999 South Asian Games final against Nepal. In his 13-year career with the Bangladesh team, he scored 12 goals. Alfaz also has 109 domestic league goals, including numerous goals in AFC club competitions. Although he played as a striker for the national team, Alfaz was often used as a playmaking forward at the domestic level.

== Early life ==
Alfaz was born in Zakiganj Upazila of Sylhet District. He spent most of his childhood in Dhaka, as his father attended work in the capital.

== Club career ==
=== Early career ===
Alfaz started his football career in 1985 in the Youth Football League. In 1987, He wore the Orient Sporting jersey in the Pioneer League. He played for Lalbagh Sporting in the Second Division during the 1988–89 season. Alfaz first played in the First Division, with Rahmatganj MFS during the 1991–92 season. His performances for Rahmatganj, gave him a chance to represent Dhanmondi giants, Dhaka Abahani, as a guest player during the 1994 Charms Cup in India. At the time, however, there was no shortage of star players at Abahani and so, Alfaz spent most games on the bench.

After being on the fringes at Abahani during his short stay, he moved to mid-table side Arambagh KS in 1994. It was at Arambagh where Alfaz regained his old form and after an impressive season at the club, in 1995, he was called up to the Bangladesh national team for the first time. The following season, he joined Abahani's arch-rivals Mohammedan SC, and thus became one of the most lethal forwards in Bangladesh.

=== Mohammedan ===
In 1995, Alfaz joined Mohammedan SC. He helped Mohammedan win the Federation Cup in his debut season as Mohammedan defeated his former club Dhaka Abahani in the final. In the following season, Alfaz, who he started his career as an attacking midfielder, was transitioned to a striker by coach, Kang Man-young. Alfaz went on to score in the first two matches in his new position, against Bangladesh Boys Club and Victoria SC, and thus he started playing regularly in that position.

The year also saw Alfaz guide Mohammedan to the 1996 Premier Division League title and help the club reach the second round of the 1996 Asian Cup Winners Cup. He was named "AFC Player of the Month" after scoring four goals, including a hat-trick, in an 8–1 victory over the Laotian club Electricity of Lao on 26 August 1996. During first his spell at the club, Alfaz became the league's second highest scorer twice, with 12 and 10 goals in 1997 and 1999, respectively, the latter as club captain and league champion. In addition to that, in 1996, he became the third highest scorer in the league with 10 goals.

=== Mohun Bagan ===
Alfaz joined Kolkata giants Mohun Bagan in 2000, alongside Mohammedan teammate Imtiaz Ahmed Nakib. He went onto appear 6 times for the club during India's 2000–01 National Football League, playing as striker behind the Brazilian José Barreto.

=== Brothers Union ===
In 2004, Brothers Union, once recognized as the country's third-biggest club in the 80s, signed Alfaz along with many other national players. The star-studded team went on to lift both the 2003–04 Dhaka Premier Division League and 2004 National League titles.

=== Return to Mohammedan ===
After returning to Mohammedan in 2005, Alfaz scored against rivals Dhaka Abahani and also assisted the first goal for Divine Chibiuka, during the final of the 2005–06 National League, as club captain. Mohammedan went on to secure the league title winning the game 2–0. This was Alfaz's fourth consecutive National League triumph. He then once again departed, joining Muktijoddha Sangsad KC for the start of the country's first ever professional league, the B.League in 2007.

=== Muktijoddha Sangsad ===
On 27 March 2007, Alfaz netted the first hat-trick in B.League history as Muktijoddha beat Rahmatganj MFS by 4–1. He scored a total of 8 goals the inaugural professional league.

=== Sheikh Russel ===
In 2008, Alfaz joined minnows Sheikh Russel KC and scored 18 league goals, helping the club finish third in the league, his most memorable performance that season was the hat-trick he scored against Khulna Abahani, as Sheikh Russel won the game 5–0.

=== Arambagh ===
In 2009, he returned to his boyhood club Arambagh KS, rejecting a financially better offer from newcomers Beanibazar SC of Sylhet. He scored twice in his return game against Chittagong Mohammedan. He helped Arambagh finish fifth that year, scoring 12 league goals, which was the fourth highest in the league that season.

=== Dhaka Abahani ===
In 2010, Alfaz signed for Dhaka Abahani. Although not a regular in the team, he scored during a 3–0 victory over Nepal's Three Star Club in the final of the Bordoloi Trophy.

=== Team BJMC ===
In 2011, Alfaz joined Team BJMC who were given direct entry to the 2011–12 Bangladesh Premier League. However, the transfer was controversial as the club was not able to submit adequate fees for registration and had unsigned papers. Nevertheless, Alfaz was able to represent the club that season, finishing with a single goal.

=== Retirement ===
Alfaz returned to Mohammedan ahead of the 2012–13 Bangladesh Premier League. On 7 April 2013, at the age of 40, Alfaz retired from professional football after a glorious 28-year career which saw him win numerous trophies and individual honors with club and country. During his retirement match, Alfaz captained Mohammedan against Dhaka Abahani in the Dhaka Derby. He played the first 19-minutes of the game, before being replaced.

== International career ==
Alfaz represented Bangladesh U19 during the 1994 AFC Youth Championship qualifiers and also managed to score in a 2–2 draw with Hong Kong U19.

After playing at Arambagh for a year, Korean coach Kang Man-young selected Alfaz for the 1995 South Asian Gold Cup squad, and handed him his senior international debut on 25 March 1995, against Pakistan. In October 1995, newly appointed German coach Otto Pfister kept him in the team for the 4-nation Tiger Trophy in Myanmar, which became the country's first ever international trophy. However, after returning from Myanmar, Alfaz was dropped from the team.

In 1997, Alfaz made his return to the team under Iraqi head coach Samir Shaker. He played all six 1998 FIFA World Cup qualifiers for the country, and scored his first goal during a 2–1 victory over Taiwan, on 18 March 1997. Alfaz went onto play the 1999 SAFF Cup, scoring against Pakistan in the group stages and the winner against Nepal in the semi-finals. However, he was left devastated as Bangladesh crashed out of the final against India.

However, during the 1999 South Asian Games which took place four months after the SAFF Cup ended, Bangladesh overcame India in the semi-finals and went on to win the final, against Nepal. Alfaz scored the only goal during the game, just before the first half ended, thus the nation earned its first gold medal. The following year, Alfaz scored a brace against South Asian counterparts India, during 2000 AFC Asian Cup qualifiers. In 2000, Alfaz was appointed national team captain for the MFF Golden Jubilee Tournament in Maldives, however, he did not play a single game in the tournament due to sickness.

On 12 February 2001, during the 2002 FIFA World Cup qualifiers held in Dammam, captain Alfaz displayed the best individual performance in his career, as Bangladesh defeated Mongolia 3–0. Alfaz scored the first goal by fainting away from three Mongolian defenders and shooting from outside the penalty area. His second goal was a solo effort, after receiving the ball on the right, he outpaced a defender, and cut inside to score from a tight angle and double his teams lead.

In 2003, Alfaz won his third title for Bangladesh, the 2003 SAFF Championship, Alfaz played all five games during the tournament, scoring against Nepal in the group stages. ALfaz went on to play the 2005 SAFF Championship, however this time his team was defeated in the final. His next goals came against Cambodia and Tajikistan respectively during the 2006 AFC Challenge Cup. The same year Alfaz, announced his retirement from international football after playing the 2007 AFC Asian Cup qualifiers. He returned to the national team in 2007 for the Nehru Cup held in India. However, his return was short lived as he was dropped from the national team in 2008, for the 2010 FIFA World Cup qualification – AFC first round.

== Managerial career ==
In 2015, Alfaz got his UEFA C license. He then worked at his former club Mohammedan as an assistant coach. Alfaz went on to coach the Bangladesh Army football team, and was also part of the Bangladesh women's national football team coaching panel. In 2019, Alfaz completed his AFC A license course. On 17 May 2014, Alfaz served as the caretaker head coach of Mohammedan during the absence of Rui Capela during their 1–0 victory over Chittagong Abahani in the 2013–14 Bangladesh Premier League. He returned to his assistant post following the game, after Mohammed Jewel Rana was appointed as caretaker.

=== Uttar Baridhara ===
On 11 November 2019, newly promoted Uttar Baridhara appointed Alfaz as the club's head coach, marking his first permanent position in the role. He first took charge of the team durting the 2019–20 Federation Cup. The inexperienced Uttar Baridhara team were not able to score during all three group stage game, as Alfaz took the risk of playing local striker Sumon Reza. On 13 February 2019, Alfaz managed his first league game for the club against Bashundhara Kings, and even though Baridhara defended well they ended up losing the game 1–0. Nonetheless, after a 8-game winless run, Alfaz was removed from his managerial post, in March 2020.

=== Mohammedan SC ===
In 2021, Alfaz was made Mohammedan's assistant coach under former national team player Shafiqul Islam Manik.

On 1 March 2023, he was appointed as the interim head coach of Mohammedan SC following Manik's departure.

== Personal life ==
In 2020, Alfaz put up his 1999 Saff-winning jersey on auction to raise money for people affected from the COVID-19 pandemic in Bangladesh.

== Career statistics ==
=== International ===
Appearances and goals by national team and year
National team	Year	Apps	Goals
Bangladesh
Bangladesh	1995	4	0
Bangladesh	1997	9	1
Bangladesh	1998	1	0
Bangladesh	1999	12	5
Bangladesh	2000	1	0
Bangladesh	2001	7	2
Bangladesh	2003	7	1
Bangladesh	2005	7	1
Bangladesh	2006	9	2
Bangladesh	2007	4	0
Bangladesh	2008	1	0
Bangladesh	Total	62	12

Scores and results list Bangladesh's goal tally first.

List of international goals scored by Alfaz Ahmed
No.	Date	Venue	Opponent	Score	Result	Competition
1.	29 March 1997	Prince Abdullah Al Faisal Stadium, Jeddah, Saudi Arabia	Chinese Taipei	2–1	2–1	1998 FIFA World Cup qualification
2.	31 August 1997	Thuwunna Stadium, Yangon, Myanmar	Myanmar	1–0	2–2	Friendly
3.	24 April 1999	Fatorda Stadium, Goa, India	Pakistan	2–0	4–0	1999 SAFF Championship
4.	29 April 1999	Fatorda Stadium, Goa, India	Nepal	2–0	2–1	1999 SAFF Championship
5.	4 October 1999	Dasarath Rangasala Stadium, Kathmandu, Nepal	Nepal	1–0	1–0	1999 South Asian Games
6.	29 November 1999	Tahnoun bin Mohammed Stadium Abu Dhabi, UAE	India	1–0	2–2	2000 AFC Asian Cup qualification
7.	29 November 1999	Tahnoun bin Mohammed Stadium Abu Dhabi, UAE	India	2–1	2–2	2000 AFC Asian Cup qualification
8.	12 February 2001	Prince Mohamed bin Fahd Stadium, Dammam, Saudi Arabia	Mongolia	1–0	3–0	2002 FIFA World Cup qualification
9.	12 February 2001	Prince Mohamed bin Fahd Stadium, Dammam, Saudi Arabia	Mongolia	2–0	3–0	2002 FIFA World Cup qualification
10.	11 January 2003	Bangabandhu National Stadium, Dhaka, Bangladesh	Nepal	1–0	1–0	2003 SAFF Championship
11.	1 April 2006	Bangabandhu National Stadium, Dhaka, Bangladesh	Cambodia	1–0	2–1	2006 AFC Challenge Cup
12.	10 April 2006	Bangabandhu National Stadium, Dhaka, Bangladesh	Tajikistan	1–1	1–6	2006 AFC Challenge Cup

=== Managerial statistics ===
As of 3 February 2024

Team	From	To	P	W	D	L	GS	GA	%W
Mohammedan SC (caretaker)	17 May 2014	17 May 2014	1	1	0	0	1	0	100.00
Uttar Baridhara SC	1 November 2019	14 March 2020	8	0	1	7	5	15	0.00
Mohammedan SC	25 February 2023	Present	26	16	7	3	55	27	61.54

== Honours ==
=== Player ===
Mohammedan SC

- Dhaka Premier Division League: 1996, 1999
- National League : 2001–02, 2005–06
- Federation Cup: 1995
- DMFA Cup: 1995
- Bangladesh Super Cup: 2013

Abahani Limited Dhaka

- Charms Cup: 1994
- Super Cup: 2011

Muktijoddha Sangsad KC

- National League: 2003
- Federation Cup: 2003

Brothers Union

- National League: 2004
- Dhaka Premier Division League: 2003–04

Bangladesh

- SAFF Championship: 2003
- South Asian Games Gold medal: 1999
- 4-nation Tiger Trophy: 1995

=== Manager ===
Mohammedan SC

- Bangladesh Premier League: 2024–25
- Federation Cup: 2022–23

=== Individual ===
- AFC player of the month – 1996 August
