= Yam Bahadur Ghale =

Nepalese footballer

YB Ghale
Personal information
- Full name: Yam Bahadur Ghale
- Date of birth: 1963 (age 62–63)
- Position: Striker

International career
Years	Team	Apps	(Gls)
- Nepal

Yam Bahadur Ghale (Nepali: याम बहादुर घले; born 1963), also known as YB Ghale, is a former forward of the Nepal national football team, as well as a former executive and technical director of the All Nepal Football Association (ANFA).

== Career ==
Ghale, son of late Gaje Ghale, the Victoria Cross recipient, was the key member of the Nepali squad which won gold medal in football during the First South Asian Games in 1984. It is the greatest achievement of Nepali football team in international arena. Ghale who ended his career as player in 1994, featured in top flight domestic football from Ranipokhari Corner Team (RCT), Friends Club, Royal Nepal Airlines Club (RNAC) and Mahendra Police Club (now Nepal Police Club).

== Retirement ==
His continued to contribute to Nepali football after his retirement as a player. He served as an executive member of ANFA for a term in 1996. He was also the technical director of ANFA and also the coach of top flight Jawalakhel Youth Club in 1995. Ghale, father of a five-year-old son, shoulders the responsibility of a family of five. He was speechless when asked about his feelings for being ignored by ANFA after spending the prime-time of his life for football.

Speaking during the function, Rohan Benjankar said the fund was raised to honor Ghale´s contribution to Nepali football. He also pledged to support football in future as well. According to Benjankar, he sold T-shirts in different cities of America and also used his personal funds to raise the funds. Upendra Man Singh, the president of Nepali National Football Players Association, said, "It is disappointing to see that none of the people residing in the country have cared for him."

== Health ==
As of 2012, YB Ghale has been bedridden for the last 4 years after suffering from stroke, which resulted in paralysis. ANFA, the most powerful and financially sound sports association in the country, has not provided any support for Ghale´s treatment. Ghale´s wife Jamuna KC received for his treatment from Nepali football fans residing outside Nepal. The amount was raised under the coordination of Rohan Benjankar, a former player and lifelong member of Friends Club of Lalitpur, who lives in the United States of America. Ghale, considered as Nepal´s all-time greatest footballer, has his right side of body paralyzed and is unable to move by himself. Ghale has undergone treatment at the Apollo Hospital in New Delhi for nearly eight times after he was referred for treatment in Delhi by Norvic Hospital.

Rohan Benjankar along with Achyut Timilsina, Mahesh Shrestha, Bishal Paudel, Jeevan Pradhan, Bijay Gurung (Hong Kong), Bhes Pun, Atul Bhattarai, Arjun Aryal (Canada), Sitaram Chaudhary (Qatar) and Dhruba Bakhati (UAE) contributed in raising the funds.

== Honours ==
Nepal

- South Asian Games Gold medal: 1984; Silver medal: 1987

== See also ==
- Raju Kaji Shakya
- Hari Khadka
- All Nepal Football Association
