= Mohamed Amanulla =

Sri Lankan football coach and player

Mohideen Mohammed Amanullah, also known as Mohamed Amanulla or Mohamed Amunulla, is a Sri Lankan football coach and a former player.

He was a player and captain for Sri Lanka national football team, and also played for Ratnam SC. Amanulla helped Sri Lanka win the 1995 South Asian Gold Cup, scoring 3 goals in the tournament.

Amanulla was the coach of the national team from 2009 to 2010. Amanulla have also coached Renown SC and Saunders SC.

== Honours ==
Sri Lanka

- SAFF Championship: 1995
