= Mizanur Rahman Mizan =

Bangladeshi footballer (born 1968)

Personal information
- Full name: Mizanur Rahman Mizan
- Date of birth: 2 May 1968 (age 58)
- Place of birth: Dacca, East Pakistan (present-day Dhaka, Bangladesh)
- Height: 1.80 m (5 ft 11 in)
- Position: Striker

Youth career
- 1983: Sunrise SC

Senior career*
Years	Team	Apps	(Gls)
1986–1987	Alam SC		
1987–1989	Fakirerpool YMC		
1989–1993	Mohammedan SC		
1993–1994	Brothers Union		
1994–1995	Muktijoddha Sangsad		
1995	East Bengal		
1996–1998	Dhaka Abahani		
1998–1999	Brothers Union		

International career
1989–1995	Bangladesh	14	(3)
Medal record
Representing Bangladesh
South Asian Games
Silver medal – second place	1989
Silver medal – second place	1995
- * Club domestic league appearances and goals

Mizanur Rahman Mizan (Bengali: মিজানুর রহমান মিজান; born 2 May 1968) is a former association football player from Bangladesh. He played for the Bangladesh national team from 1989 till 1997. He scored against Sri Lanka during the Burma Tournament 1995 which Bangladesh won. He wore the no 10 jersey during the tournament. He started his international career during the 1989 President's Gold Cup as a member of the Bangladesh Green team.

== International career ==
=== International ===
Appearances and goals by national team and year
National team	Year	Apps	Goals
Bangladesh
Bangladesh	1989	3	0
Bangladesh	1994	2	1
Bangladesh	1995	9	2
Bangladesh	Total	14	3

Scores and results list Bangladesh's goal tally first.

List of international goals scored by Mizanur Rahman Mizan
#	Date	Venue	Opponent	Score	Result	Competition
1.	16 September 1994	National Stadium, Doha, Qatar	Yemen	1–0	1–0	Qatar Independence Cup
2.	27 March 1995	Sugathadasa Stadium, Colombo, Sri Lanka	Nepal	1–0	2–0	1995 SAFF Cup
3.	1 November 1995	Thuwunna Stadium, Yangon, Myanmar	Sri Lanka	1–0	1–0	Burma Cup

== Honours ==
Fakirerpool YMC

- Dhaka Second Division League: 1987

Mohammedan SC

- Federation Cup: 1989
- Independence Cup: 1991

East Bengal

- IFA Shield: 1995

Bangladesh

- 4-nation Tiger Trophy: 1995
- South Asian Games Silver medal: 1989, 1995

Individual

- 1987 − Dhaka Second Division League top scorer
