= Khare Basnet =

Bhutanese footballer and manager (born 1956)

Personal information
- Full name: Kharga Bahadur Basnet
- Date of birth: 28 February 1956 (age 70)
- Place of birth: Bhutan
- Position: Striker

Senior career*
Years	Team	Apps	(Gls)
- Thimphu XI
1980	Mohammedan	2	(0)

International career
- Bhutan

Managerial career
- 2003–2008: Bhutan
- * Club domestic league appearances and goals

Kharga Basnet (born 28 February 1956), also known as Khare Basnet, is a retired Bhutanese football coach and player who coached the Bhutan national team and also served as the general secretary of the Bhutan Football Federation.

== Playing career ==
In 1980, Basnet was contracted by Bangladeshi club Mohammedan SC, and played two games in the Super League round of the Dhaka First Division Football League for the eventual champions.

== Post-playing career ==
He served in various positions in the Bhutan Football Federation, among others, was the general secretary of the federation.

He coached Bhutan national team until 2008.

Basnet has retired from Bhutan Football Federation.

== Career statistics ==
#	Date	Venue	Opponent	Score	Result	Competition
1.	23 November 1987	Calcutta, India	Nepal	6–2	Lost	1987 South Asian Games
2.	23 November 1987	Calcutta, India	Nepal	6–2	Lost	1987 South Asian Games
Correct as of 21 July 2013

== Honours ==
Mohammedan SC

- Dhaka First Division League: 1980
