= Bal Gopal Maharjan =

Nepali football coach

Personal information
- Date of birth: 28 August 1975 (age 51)
- Place of birth: Lalitpur, Nepal
- Position: Striker

Team information
- Current team: Church Boys United (head coach)

Senior career*
Years	Team	Apps	(Gls)
1991–1993	Brothers Union		
2000–2001	Brothers Union		

International career
1993	Nepal		

Managerial career
- 2006–2010: Three Star Club
- 2010–2011: Manang Marshyangdi Club
- 2012–2014: Nepal U-16
- 2015–2016: Nepal U-20
- 2016: Nepal
- 2016: Brothers Union
- 2018: Nepal (assistant)
- 2018–2020: Nepal U23
- 2018: Nepal (interim)
- 2020: Nepal (interim)
- 2020–2021: Nepal
- 2021–2022: Kathmandu Rayzrs
- 2024–: Church Boys United
Medal record
Men's football
Representing Nepal
South Asian Games
Gold medal – first place	1993 Bangladesh	Team
Silver medal – second place	1999 Kathmandu	Team
- * Club domestic league appearances and goals

Bal Gopal Maharjan (Nepali: बाल गोपाल महर्जन, born 28 August 1975) is a Nepali former professional footballer and current head coach. He was in the squad which won the historic 1993 South Asian Games gold. After his retirement, Bal Gopal has been coaching different club and national Nepali teams.

== Career ==
His major achievement during his playing career was the 1993 South Asian Games gold medal. From 1991 to 1993, he played for Bangladeshi club Brothers Union. He also appeared with Indian side Mahindra United in 2001–02. After retirement, he started managerial career with Three Star Club.

Maharjan coached the national team to victory in the 2015 SAFF U-19 Championship and again in the 2016 Bangabandhu Cup. On 1 June 2016, Bal Gopal was appointed manager of Brothers Union on a three-month contract, thus becoming the first Nepali to lead a top-tier club in another country.

On 10 June 2018, he was appointed the assistant coach of the Nepal national football team under head coach Koji Gyotoku ahead of 2018 Asian Games.

On 25 August 2018, he was named the interim head coach of the national team from Koji Gyotoku, after the Japanese was entangled in visa issues.

On 8 September 2018, Nepal defeated hosts Bangladesh 2–0 to enter the semifinals of 2018 SAFF Championship. He was also coach of the Nepali team that won the 2021 Three Nations Cup, defeating Bangladesh.

== Statistics ==
As of March 2021

Record by team and tenure
Team	From	To	Record					Ref.
Team	From	To	P	W	D	L	Win %	Ref.
Nepal	1 January 2016	31 January 2016	6	4	2	0	66.7	
Brothers Union	1 June 2016	20 August 2016	6	0	5	1	0.0	
Nepal (Caretaker)	25 August 2018	31 December 2018	6	2	0	4	33.3	
Nepal (Caretaker)	26 October 2020	9 December 2020	2	0	1	1	0.0	
Nepal	10 December 2020	4 April 2021	3	1	2	0	33.3	
Total			23	7	10	6	30.4	—

== Honours ==
=== Player ===
Brothers Union

- Bangladesh Federation Cup (1): 1991

Nepal

- SAG Football (1): 1993

=== Manager ===
Nepal U20

- SAFF U-20 Championship (1): 2015

Nepal

- Bangabandhu Cup (1): 2016
- Three Nations Cup (1): 2021

Nepal U23

- South Asian Games (1): 2019
