= Football at the 1999 South Asian Games =

1999 South Asian Games

Tournament details
- Host country: Nepal
- Dates: 24 September – 4 October
- Teams: 6 (from 1 confederation)
- Venue: 1 (in 1 host city)

Final positions
- Champions: Bangladesh (1st title)
- Runners-up: Nepal
- Third place: India

Tournament statistics
- Matches played: 13
- Goals scored: 45 (3.46 per match)
- Top scorer: (India) I. M. Vijayan (7 goals)
- Best player: (India) I. M. Vijayan
- All statistics correct as of 4 October 1999.

Men's Football at the 1999 South Asian Games was held in Kathmandu, Nepal from September 24 to October 4, 1999.

== Fixtures and results ==
Accurate as of 4 October 1999.

=== Group A ===
Pos	Team	Pld	W	D	L	GF	GA	GD	Pts	Qualification
1	Maldives	2	2	0	0	6	1	+5	6	Advance to Semi finals
2	Bangladesh	2	1	0	1	2	2	0	3	Advance to Semi finals
3	Sri Lanka	2	0	0	2	0	5	−5	0	

Source: RSSSF
Rules for classification: 1) points; 2) goal difference; 3) goals scored; 4) head-to-head result.
24 September 1999

Sri Lanka	0–4	Maldives
	Report	Ibrahim 24'; Latheef 47'; Shahin 52'; Abdullah 89'

Dasarath Rangasala Stadium, Kathmandu

27 September 1999

Bangladesh	1–2	Maldives
Jewel 90'	Report	Shiham 75'; Mizam 86'

Dasarath Rangasala Stadium, Kathmandu

29 September 1999

Bangladesh	1–0	Sri Lanka
Jewel 34'	Report

Dasarath Rangasala Stadium, Kathmandu

=== Group B ===
Pos	Team	Pld	W	D	L	GF	GA	GD	Pts	Qualification
1	India	3	3	0	0	12	2	+10	9	Advance to Semi finals
2	Nepal	3	2	0	1	10	5	+5	6	Advance to Semi finals
3	Pakistan	3	1	0	2	5	9	−4	3	
4	Bhutan	3	0	0	3	1	12	−11	0	

Source: RSSSF
Rules for classification: 1) points; 2) goal difference; 3) goals scored; 4) head-to-head result.
26 September 1999

India	5–2	Pakistan
Alberto 8'; Pasha 12'; Vijayan 52', 61', 73' (pen.)	Report	Yousaf 73'; Zaman 90+1'

Dasarath Rangasala Stadium, Kathmandu
26 September 1999

Nepal	7–0	Bhutan
Khadka 2', 5'; Joshi 18'; Amatya 59'; Rayamajhi 62'; Thapa 77', 86'	Report

Dasarath Rangasala Stadium, Kathmandu

28 September 1999

India	3–0	Bhutan
Vijayan 1', 8', 49'	Report

Dasarath Rangasala Stadium, Kathmandu
28 September 1999

Nepal	3–1	Pakistan
Ali 40' (o.g.); Khadka 61'; Maharjan 77'	Report	Zaman 53'

Dasarath Rangasala Stadium, Kathmandu

30 September 1999

India	4–0	Nepal
Alberto 4', 45'; Hardeep 29'; Moolanchikkal 48'	Report

Dasarath Rangasala Stadium, Kathmandu
30 September 1999

Pakistan	2–1	Bhutan
Yousaf 61', 74'	Report	Chhetri 26'

Dasarath Rangasala Stadium, Kathmandu

=== Knockout round ===
Semifinals
2 October
Maldives	1
Nepal	2
2 October
India	0
Bangladesh	1

Gold medal match
4 October
Nepal	0
Bangladesh	1
Bronze medal match
4 October
India	3
Maldives	1

==== Semi finals ====
2 October 1999

Maldives	1–2	Nepal
A. Ghafoor 42'	Report	Joshi 11'; Khadka 15'

Dasarath Rangasala Stadium, Kathmandu

2 October 1999

India	0–1	Bangladesh
	Report	Tipu 64'

Dasarath Rangasala Stadium, Kathmandu

=== Bronze medal match ===
4 October 1999

India	3–1	Maldives
Vijayan 17'; Pasha 86'; R. Vijayan 89'	Report	A. Ghafoor 9'

Dasarath Rangasala Stadium, Kathmandu

=== Gold medal match ===
4 October 1999

Nepal	0–1	Bangladesh
	Report	Alfaz 44'

Dasarath Rangasala Stadium, Kathmandu

== Winner ==
Football at the 1999 South Asian Games

Bangladesh
First title

== Goalscorers ==
7 Goals

- (India) I. M. Vijayan

4 Goal

- (Nepal) Hari Khadka

3 Goals

- (India) Jules C. Dias Alberto
- (Pakistan) Haroon Yousaf

2 Goals

- (Bangladesh) Jewel Rana
- (Maldives) Mausoom Abdul Ghafoor
- (India) Syed Sabir Pasha
- (Nepal) Naresh Joshi
- (Nepal) Basanta Thapa
- (Maldives) Ali Shiham
- (Pakistan) Gohar Zaman

1 Goal

- (Bangladesh) Shahajuddin Tipu
- (Bangladesh) Alfaz Ahmed
- (Bhutan) Dinesh Chhetri
- (India) Hardeep Singh
- (India) Majeeb Moolanchikkal
- (India) Raman Vijayan
- (Maldives) Adam Abdul Latheef
- (Maldives) Ibrahim Abdullah
- (Maldives) Muhammad Ibrahim
- (Maldives) Mohammed Mizam
- (Nepal) Bal Gopal Maharjan
- (Nepal) Deepak Amatya
- (Nepal) Rajan Rayamajhi

=== Own Goal ===
- (Pakistan) Dilshad Ali (playing against (Nepal) )
