= Krishna Thapa =

Nepalese professional football manager (born 1955)

Personal information
- Full name: Krishna Bahadur Thapa
- Date of birth: 8 August 1955 (age 71)
- Place of birth: Nepal

Managerial career
- Years: Team
- Nepal U22
- 2011: Nepal (caretaker)
- 2012: Nepal (caretaker)
- LH MMC

Krishna Bahadur Thapa (Nepali: कृष्ण थापा; born 8 August 1955) is a Nepalese professional football manager.

== Career ==
Thapa worked as manager of the Nepal U22 team. In 2011 and 2012 he coached the Nepal national football team. Later he became the head coach of the Kathmandu-based LH MMC.

== Honours ==
Nepal

- South Asian Games Silver medal: 1987
