= Mohammed Jewel Rana =

Bangladeshi footballer

Jewel Rana
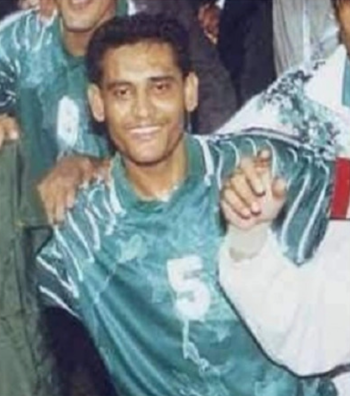
- Jewel celebrating after winning gold at the 1999 South Asian Games with Bangladesh

Personal information
- Full name: Mohammed Jewel Rana
- Date of birth: 2 May 1968 (age 58)
- Place of birth: Dhaka, Bangladesh
- Height: 1.79 m (5 ft 10 1/2 in)
- Positions: Center-back; right-back

Youth career
- 1984–1986: East Bengal Club

Senior career*
Years	Team	Apps	(Gls)
1986–1988	East Bengal Limited		
1988–1991	Muktijoddha Sangsad		
1991–1994	Dhaka Mohammedan		
1991	Kolkata Mohammedan		
1994–1995	Muktijoddha Sangsad		
1995–1997	Dhaka Mohammedan		
1997–1999	Muktijoddha Sangsad		
1999–2000	Mohun Bagan AC		
2000–2003	Brothers Union		
2003–2004	Dhaka Mohammedan		
2005–2008	Brothers Union		
2008–2009	Dhaka Mohammedan		

International career
1988	Bangladesh U16		
1990	Bangladesh U19		
1991	Bangladesh U23	8	(0)
1989–2001	Bangladesh	40	(4)

Managerial career
- 2014: Dhaka Mohammedan (caretaker)
Medal record
Men's football
Representing Bangladesh
SAFF Championship
Runner-up	1999 India
South Asian Games
Silver medal – second place	1989 Islamabad
Bronze medal – third place	1991 Colombo
Silver medal – second place	1995 Madras
Gold medal – first place	1999 Kathmandu
- * Club domestic league appearances and goals

Mohammed Jewel Rana (Bengali: মোহাম্মদ জুয়েল রানা; born 2 May 1968) is a retired Bangladeshi professional footballer who played as a center-back. He served as captain of the Bangladesh national team from 1997 to 1999.

== Early career ==
Jewel was born on 2 May 1968 in Dhanmondi area of Dhaka, Bangladesh. His formed a passion for football while studying at West Dhanmondi Yousuf High School, and eventually began his football career playing for a team called East Bengal in the Pioneer League in 1984. Although he only made one appearance in his debut season due to sickness, he was a regular face in the team, which also included Saiful Bari Titu, from the following season. Jewel began playing in the Third Division with a different East Bengal from 1986, and helped the club win the league in his debut season. Following a season representing the club in the Second Division, he joined Muktijoddha Sangsad KC in the First Division in 1988 under the recommendation of the club's winger, Zia Babu.

== Club career ==
Jewel's career spanned over two decades, representing clubs such as Muktijoddha Sangsad KC, Dhaka Mohammedan and Brothers Union. He was part of the Muktijoddha team that secured their maiden Premier Division title in the 1997–98 season. Additionally, he won league titles with Dhaka Mohammedan in 1993 and again as captain in 1996, as well as with Brothers Union in 2005. Notably, Jewel also represented Brothers Union in the 2005 AFC Cup.

Beyond Dhaka, Jewel also played in India, representing Kolkata Mohammedan during the 1991 season, alongside compatriots like Imtiaz Sultan Johnny, Kaiser Hamid and Sayeed Hassan Kanan. Following an impressive but unsuccessful 1999–2000 Asian Club Championship campaign with Muktijoddha, he joined Mohun Bagan and competed in tournaments such as the Calcutta League, Durand Cup and IFA Shield.

Jewel retired on 24 January 2009, after representing Dhaka Mohammedan in the Dhaka derby against Dhaka Abahani in the 2008–09 B.League. During the match, Jewel, a central defender, was played as a right-back for 25 minutes before being substituted during which he received a standing ovation from both fans and opposition players.

== International career ==
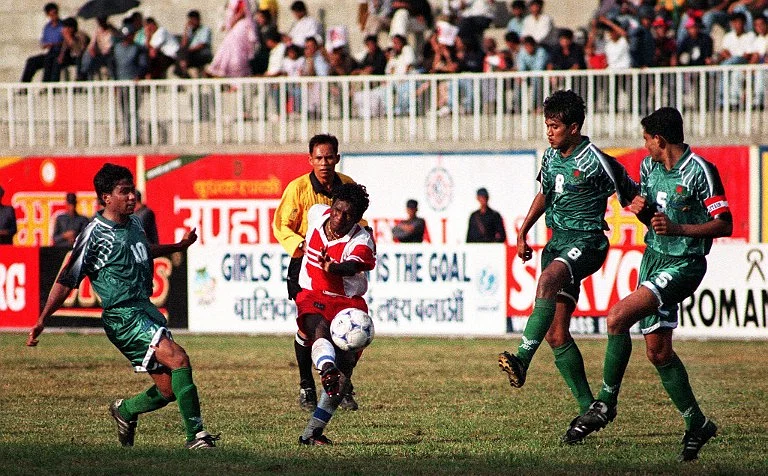
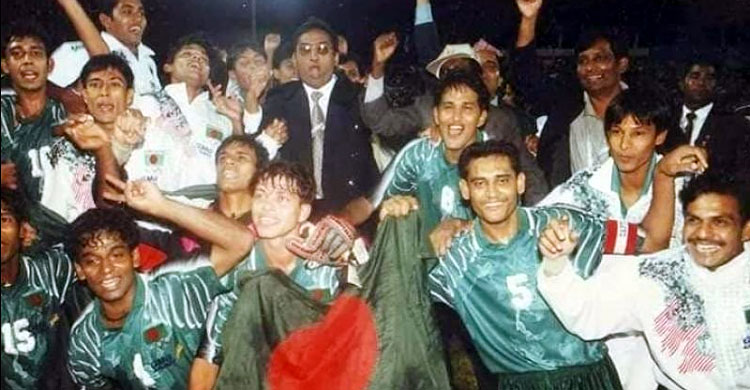
Captain Jewel (furthest to the right) in action against India during the 1999 South Asian Games semi-final (above); he eventually celebrated Bangladesh's maiden gold medal following tirupmh over hosts, Nepal, in the final (below).

Jewel represented Bangladesh at youth level in the qualifiers of both the 1988 AFC U-16 Championship and 1990 AFC Youth Championship. Additionally, he was part of the Bangladesh Green team (B national team) at the 1989 President's Gold Cup. He also participated in the 1992 Summer Olympics – Men's Asian Qualifiers, during which he scored an own goal in a 0−4 defeat to Thailand U23.

Following his performance for the Bangladesh Green team in the President's Gold Cup, Jewel was included in the Bangladesh national team for the 1989 South Asian Games held in Islamabad, Pakistan. However, he did not make a single appearance during the tournament. He debuted for the national team on 24 December 1991, against Pakistan at the Sugathadasa Stadium during the 1991 South Asian Games. He also represented the national team during the 1994 FIFA World Cup qualifiers, 1993 South Asian Games, 1995 South Asian Gold Cup and 1995 South Asian Games.

On 18 March 1997, he scored his first international goal against Chinese Taipei at the 1998 FIFA World Cup qualifiers. During the qualifiers he also scored against Saudi Arabia, in a match which saw Bangladesh lose 4–1, even after putting up a good fight. During the qualifiers he served as the national team captain following the retirement of Monem Munna. Jewel also captained Bangladesh during their disappointing 1997 SAFF Gold Cup campaign. He remained captain during the 1999 South Asian Games in Kathmandu, Nepal and guided Bangladesh to their maiden gold medal. During the tournament he scored against both Maldives and Sri Lanka. He announced his retirement from international football following the tournament.

== Coaching career ==
On 22 May 2014, Jewel was appointed caretaker head coach of his former club, Dhaka Mohammedan, following the departure of Portuguese coach, Rui Capela, and remained incharge for two games.

== Personal life ==
In 2016, Jewel moved to Canada with his family.

On 22 April 2021, Jewel's father, Manik Uddin Ahmed, died at the age of 82.

== Career statistics ==
=== International ===
Appearances and goals by national team and year
National team	Year	Apps	Goals
Bangladesh
Bangladesh	1991	3	0
Bangladesh	1993	11	0
Bangladesh	1994	2	0
Bangladesh	1995	6	0
Bangladesh	1997	9	2
Bangladesh	1998	1	0
Bangladesh	1999	8	2
Bangladesh	Total	40	4

Scores and results list Bangladesh's goal tally first

List of international goals scored by Mohammed Jewel Rana
No.	Date	Venue	Opponent	Score	Result	Competition
1.	18 March 1997	Shah Alam Stadium, Shah Alam, Malaysia	Chinese Taipei	1–2	1–3	1998 FIFA World Cup qualification
2.	20 March 1997	Shah Alam Stadium, Shah Alam, Malaysia	Saudi Arabia	1–2	1–4	1998 FIFA World Cup qualification
3.	27 September 1999	Dasarath Rangasala Stadium, Kathmandu, Nepal	Maldives	1–2	1–2	1999 South Asian Games
4.	29 September 1999	Dasarath Rangasala Stadium, Kathmandu, Nepal	Sri Lanka	1–0	1–0	1999 South Asian Games

== Honours ==
Dhaka Mohammedan

- Dhaka Premier Division League: 1993, 1996
- Federation Cup: 1995, 2008
- Independence Cup: 1991

Muktijoddha Sangsad KC

- Dhaka Premier Division League: 1997–98
- Mahanagari Cup: 1997
- McDowell's Cup: 1998

Brothers Union

- Dhaka Premier Division League: 2005
- Federation Cup: 2005

Bangladesh

- South Asian Games Gold medal: 1999; Silver medal: 1989, 1995; Bronze medal: 1991

=== Awards and accolades ===
- 1999 − Sports Writers Association's Best Sportsperson Award.
- 1996 − Sports Writers Association's Best Footballer Award.
- 2015 − National Sports Award.
