= Mani Shah =

Nepalese footballer

Personal information
- Full name: Mani Bikram Shah
- Date of birth: 1967
- Place of birth: Kathmandu, Nepal
- Date of death: 14 May 2018 (aged 51)
- Place of death: Kathmandu, Nepal
- Position: Midfielder

International career
Years	Team	Apps	(Gls)
1985–1998	Nepal	48	
Medal record
Men's football
Representing Nepal
South Asian Games
Gold medal – first place	1993 Dhaka	Team competition
Silver medal – second place	1987 Kolkata	Team competition

Mani Bikram Shah (1967 – 14 May 2018) was a Nepalese footballer who played as a midfielder for, and captained, the national team, earning 48 caps between 1985 and 1998.

== Honours ==
Nepal

- South Asian Games Gold medal: 1993; Silver medal: 1987
