= Football at the 1984 South Asian Games =

1984 South Asian Games Football Tournament
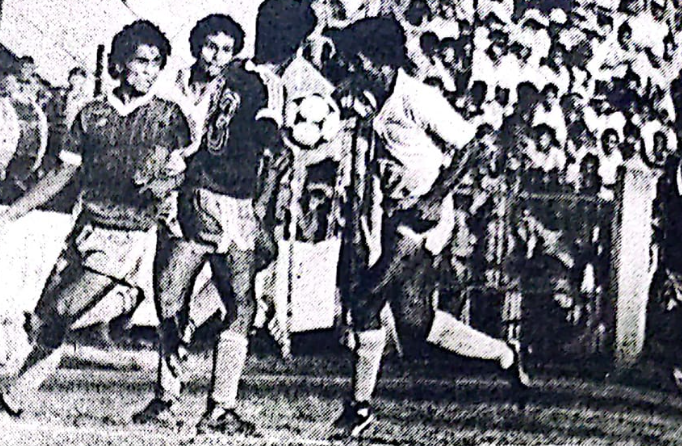
- Bangladesh vs Nepal final

Tournament details
- Host country: Nepal
- Dates: 18–21 September
- Teams: 4 (from 1 confederation)
- Venue: 1 (in 1 host city)

Final positions
- Champions: Nepal (1st title)
- Runners-up: Bangladesh
- Third place: Maldives
- Fourth place: Bhutan

Tournament statistics
- Matches played: 7
- Goals scored: 28 (4 per match)
- Top scorer: (Bangladesh) Ashraf Uddin Ahmed Chunnu (5 goals)

The men's football tournament at the 1984 South Asian Games was held from 18 to 21 September 1981 in Kathmandu, Nepal.

Nepal won the tournament by defeating Bangladesh in the final.

== Participating nations ==
Country	Appearance
Nepal (Host)	1st
Bangladesh	1st
Bhutan	1st
Maldives	1st

== Group stage ==
All the results entered are same as found in rsssf

=== Group stage ===
Pos	Team	Pld	W	D	L	GF	GA	GD	Pts	Qualification
1	Bangladesh	3	3	0	0	12	0	+12	9	Qualified for Gold-medal match
2	Nepal	3	2	0	1	9	5	+4	6	Qualified for Gold-medal match
3	Maldives	3	1	0	2	1	9	−8	3	
4	Bhutan	3	0	0	3	0	8	−8	0	

18 September 1984

Nepal	4–0	Maldives
Thapa; Krishna; Sharma	Report

Dasharath Stadium, Kathmandu
18 September 1984

Bangladesh	2–0	Bhutan
Aslam 13'; Chunnu 43'	Report

Dasharath Stadium, Kathmandu

19 September 1984

Bangladesh	5–0	Maldives
Chunnu 2', 72'; Aslam 18', 85'; Emily 36'	Report

Dasharath Stadium, Kathmandu

20 September 1984

Nepal	5–0	Bhutan
Thapa; Kiran; Krishna	Report

Dasharath Stadium, Kathmandu

21 September 1984

Maldives	1–0	Bhutan
	Report

Dasharath Stadium, Kathmandu
21 September 1984

Bangladesh	5–0	Nepal
Wasim; Arif; Sohel	Report

Dasharath Stadium, Kathmandu

== Gold-medal match ==
23 September 1984

Nepal	4–2	Bangladesh
Johnny 5' (o.g.); Ghale 51', 68'; Panthi 53'	Report; Report	Chunnu 35', 87'

Dasharath Stadium, Kathmandu
Attendance: 30,000

== Winners ==
Football at the 1985 South Asian Games

Nepal
First title
