= Ganesh Thapa =

Nepalese footballer

- गणेश थापा
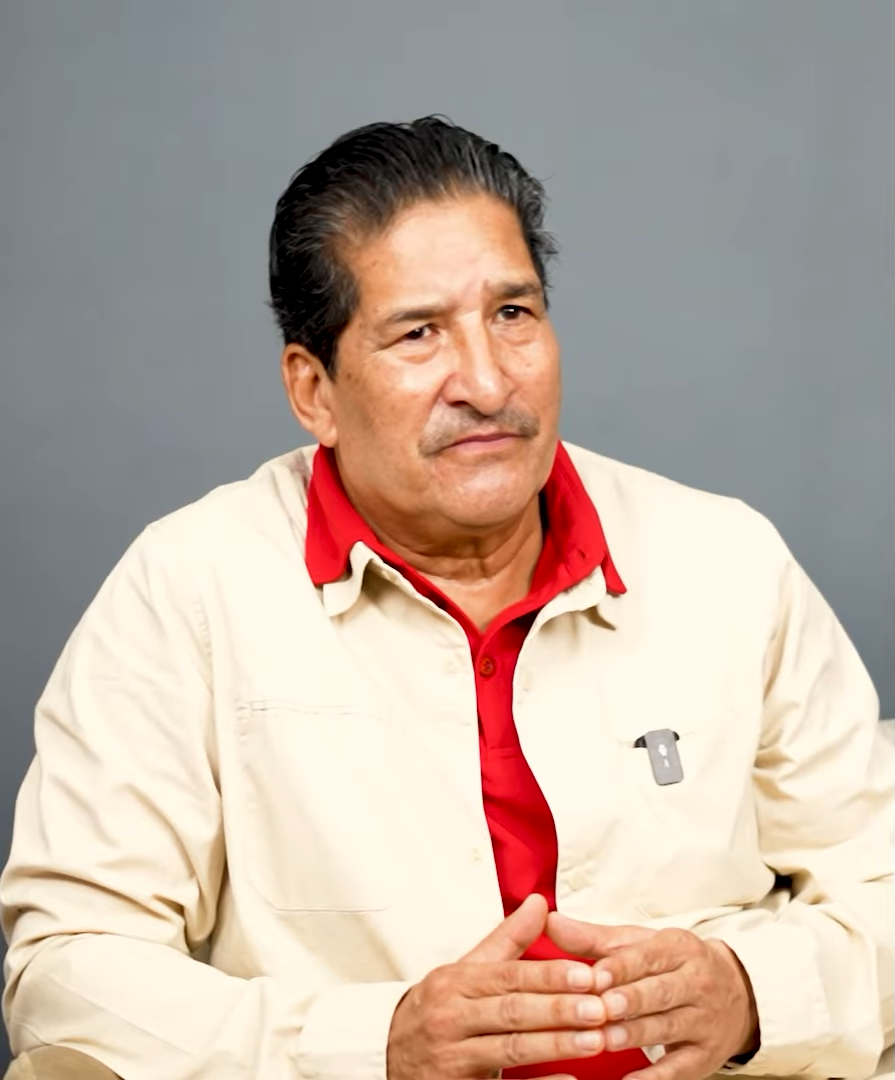
- Thapa in 2025
- Born: 9 October 1960 (age 66)

President of the All Nepal Football Association
- In office 1995–2015
Association football career
- Positions: Midfielder; striker
Senior career*
Years	Team	Apps	(Gls)
1978–1981	Royal Nepal Airlines		
1981–1982	Mohammedan SC		
1982	Abahani Krira Chakra		
1983	Dhaka Wanderers		
1984	East Bengal		
1985–1986	Mohammedan SC		
1987–1988	Manang Marshyangdi		
1988–1989	Rahmatganj MFS		
International career
1981–1989	Nepal	40	(14)
- * Club domestic league appearances and goals

Ganesh Thapa (Nepali: गणेश थापा; born 9 October 1960) is a Nepali former football player and a former president of the All Nepal Football Association (ANFA). He was formerly the president of the South Asian Football Federation and the vice president of Asian Football Confederation (AFC). He is considered one of the greatest Nepali footballers of all time. He scored the first international goal for Nepal against Philippines in King’s Cup - Bangkok, Thailand in 1982. He also served as Member of Parliament in Constituent Assembly of Nepal.

== Club career ==
Thapa played for East Bengal FC in the Calcutta Football League. He also played in the Dhaka First Division League for Mohammedan, Rahmatganj MFS and Dhaka Wanderers. Thapa also represented Abahani Krira Chakra at the 1981–82 Aga Khan Gold Cup.

== International career career ==
Thapa was a national football player and captain from 1981 to 1989.

== Personal life ==
Thapa is the younger brother of politician Kamal Thapa. Thapa is married to Hajuri Thapa and has two sons, Gaurav Thapa and Abhishek Thapa.

== Changes to the Nepali football made under Thapa ==
- Started the already stopped ANFA Martyr's Memorial A-Division League
- Created ANFA Youth Academy
- Gave special focus to youth football
- Tried to make Nepali Football League system more professional
- Development of Nepali Football
- Better facilities and rewards for players

== Corruption case ==
Following the corruption case of Mohammed bin Hammam. British newspaper “The Sunday Times” reported that All Nepal Football Association (ANFA) president Ganesh Thapa had received £115,000 from the banned president of Asian Football Confederation and FIFA’s executive committee. The Associated Press revealed that Thapa received an illegal gift of $100,000 from bin Hammam in 2009. The money was deposited into the personal bank account of Thapa's son, Gaurav Thapa.

Thapa later claimed that he borrowed the money for his personal use, and such a revelation would not tarnish the image of Nepal and Nepali football.

In November 2015 the FIFA Ethics Committee banned him for 10 years. Thapa appealed the decision to FIFA Appeal Committee. The Appeal was rejected and his ban from FIFA Ethics Committee was partially confirmed. His ban started on 16 April 2015 and ended on 16 April 2025.

In 2017, Thapa stated that as far as the corruption case was concerned, he had already received clean chit in Nepal, and that time would prove that he was innocent in relation to cases outside Nepal.

== Career statistics ==
=== International goals ===
List of international goals scored by Ganesh Thapa
No.	Date	Venue	Opponent	Score	Result	Competition
1	7 May 1982	Bangkok, Thailand	Thailand	1–3	1–3	1982 King's Cup
2	4 September 1983	Dhaka Stadium, Dhaka, Bangladesh	Bangladesh		2–4	1983 President's Gold Cup
3	18 September 1984	Dasharath Stadium, Kathmandu, Nepal	Maldives		4–0	1984 South Asian Games
4	18 September 1984	Dasharath Stadium, Kathmandu, Nepal	Maldives		4–0	1984 South Asian Games
5	20 September 1984	Dasharath Stadium, Kathmandu, Nepal	Bhutan		5–0	1984 South Asian Games
6	20 September 1984	Dasharath Stadium, Kathmandu, Nepal	Bhutan		5–0	1984 South Asian Games
7	4 December 1986	Dasharath Stadium, Kathmandu, Nepal	Bangladesh	1–0	1–0	1986 Panchayat Silver Jubilee Cup
8	21 November 1987	Salt Lake Stadium, Kolkata, India	Bangladesh	1–0	1–0	1987 South Asian Games
9	25 April 1987	Dasharath Stadium, Kathmandu, Nepal	Pakistan	2–1	2–2	1988 Summer Olympics qualifiers
10	23 November 1987	Salt Lake Stadium, Kolkata, India	Bhutan		6–2	1987 South Asian Games
11	23 November 1987	Salt Lake Stadium, Kolkata, India	Bhutan		6–2	1987 South Asian Games
12	23 November 1987	Salt Lake Stadium, Kolkata, India	Bhutan		6–2	1987 South Asian Games
13	23 November 1987	Salt Lake Stadium, Kolkata, India	Bhutan		6–2	1987 South Asian Games
14	23 November 1987	Salt Lake Stadium, Kolkata, India	Bhutan		6–2	1987 South Asian Games

== Honours ==
Nepal

- South Asian Games Silver medal: 1987
