= Basanta Thapa =

Nepali former footballer

Personal information
- Date of birth: 10 April 1977 (age 49)
- Place of birth: Kathmandu, Nepal
- Height: 1.71 m (5 ft 7 in)
- Position: Forward

Senior career*
Years	Team	Apps	(Gls)
1997–2000	MMC		
2000–2001	Brothers Union		
2002	Rahmatganj		
2002–2013	MMC		

International career
1998–2006	Nepal	27	(7)
- * Club domestic league appearances and goals

Basanta Thapa (born 10 April 1977) is a Nepali former footballer who played as a forward for MMC and the Nepal national football team.

== Career ==
Thapa is a former Nepal international. He won Player of the Martyrs' Memorial League 2061. He started his career with MMC in 1997.

In 2005, Thapa trialed for Japanese second tier side Avispa Fukuoka. He was called up for the national team to play at the 2006 AFC Challenge Cup.

In 2001, he played for Bangladeshi club Brothers Union in the Dhaka Premier Division Football League, and scored 6 goals in the relegation play-offs in the league.

He has scored over 50 goals in the Nepal league. He was known for his goalscoring prowess.
