= Burma Tournament 1995 =

International football tournament

1995 Burma Tournament
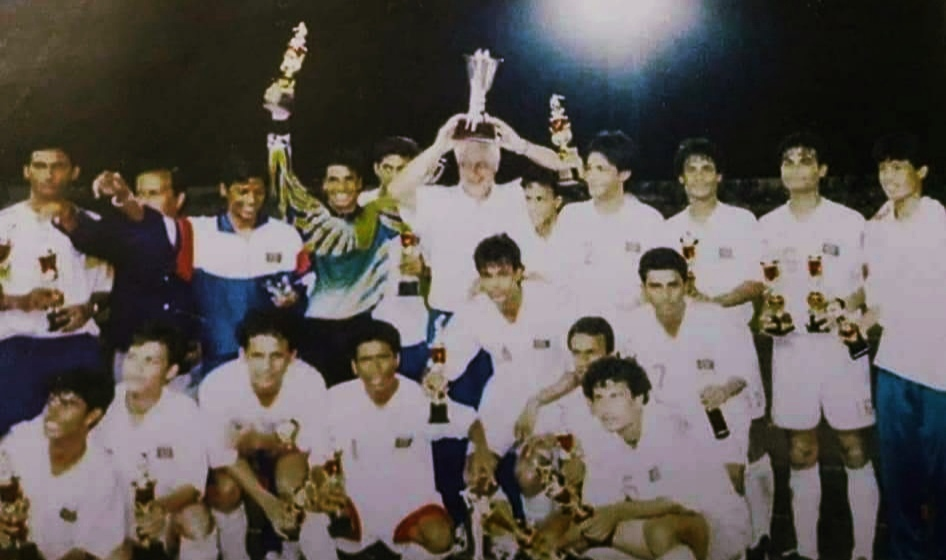
- Bangladesh, after winning the trophy

Tournament details
- Host country: Myanmar
- City: Yangon
- Dates: 26 October–4 November 1995
- Teams: 4 (from 1 confederation)
- Venue: Thuwunna Stadium (in 1 host city)

Final positions
- Champions: Bangladesh
- Runners-up: Myanmar

Tournament statistics
- Matches played: 7
- Goals scored: 15 (2.14 per match)
- Top scorer(s): (Myanmar) Than Toe Aung (Myanmar) Myo Hlaing Win (5 goals)

The Burma Tournament 1995 (Burmese: မြန်မာနိုင်ငံပြိုင်ပွဲ ၁၉၉၅), alternatively known as the 4-nation Tiger Trophy, was an international association football friendly tournament organised by Myanmar Football Federation (MFF). It took place from 26 October to 4 November 1995 in Myanmar.

== Participants countries ==
The following four teams will contest in the tournament. FIFA ranking as of 17 October 1995.

Country	Confederation	FIFA Ranking	Confederation Ranking
Bangladesh	AFC	134	25
Myanmar (Host)	AFC	138	26
Sri Lanka	AFC	127	21
Singapore AFSA	AFC	Unranked (Note: The Singapore Army Football Team represented Singapore during the tournament.)	

== Venue ==
All matches were held at the Thuwunna Stadium in Yangon, Myanmar.

Yangon
Thuwunna Stadium
Capacity: 50,000
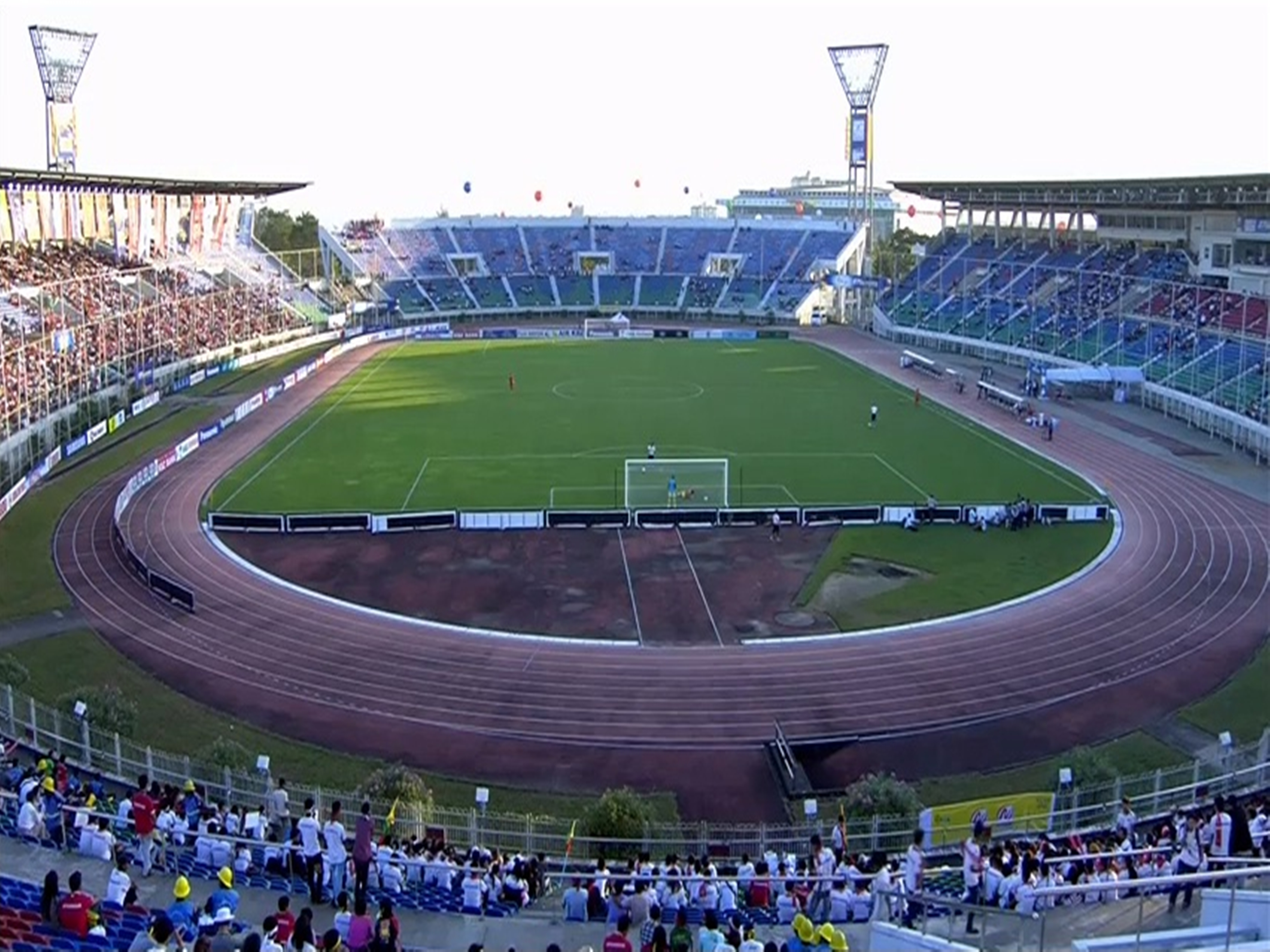

== Group stage ==
The four teams competing against each other in the group stage in a single round-robin method. At the end of group matches, the top two teams advanced to the final and two teams were eliminated.

=== Table ===
Team	Pld	W	D	L	GF	GA	GD	Pts	Qualification
Myanmar	3	3	0	0	9	0	+9	9	Advance to the Final
Bangladesh	3	2	0	1	2	4	−2	6	Advance to the Final
Singapore AFSA	3	1	0	2	1	4	−3	3	
Sri Lanka	3	0	0	3	0	4	−4	0	

Source: RSSSF
26 October 1995

Myanmar	4–0	Bangladesh
Than Toe Aung; Myo Hlaing Win	Report

Thuwunna Stadium, Yangon
Attendance: 17,000

27 October 1995

Singapore AFSA	1–0	Sri Lanka
Razuldin Yacob 30'	Report

Thuwunna Stadium, Yangon

29 October 1995

Myanmar	2–0	Sri Lanka
Myo Myint Htwe 75'; Than Toe Aung 88'	Report

Thuwunna Stadium, Yangon
Attendance: 17,000

30 October 1995

Bangladesh	1–0	Singapore AFSA
Shahidul Ahmed Ranjan 10'	Report

Thuwunna Stadium, Yangon

1 November 1995

Sri Lanka	0–1	Bangladesh
	Report	Mizan 22'

Thuwunna Stadium, Yangon

2 November 1995

Myanmar	3–0	Singapore AFSA
Myo Hlaing Win 21', 64'; Myo Myint Htwe 79'	Report

Thuwunna Stadium, Yangon
Attendance: 12,000

== Final ==
4 November 1995

Myanmar	1–2	Bangladesh
Myo Hlaing Win 32'	Report	Mamun 18'; Nakib 49'

Thuwunna Stadium, Yangon
Attendance: 20,000

== Statistics ==
=== Goalscorers ===
4 goals

- (Myanmar) Myo Hlaing Win
- (Myanmar) Than Toe Aung

2 goals

- (Myanmar) Myo Myint Htwe

1 goal

- (Singapore) Razuldin Yacob
- (Bangladesh) Shahidul Ahmed Ranjan
- (Bangladesh) Mizanur Rahman Mizan
- (Bangladesh) Mamun Joarder
- (Bangladesh) Imtiaz Ahmed Nakib

== Champions ==
Burma Tournament 1995

Bangladesh
