= Hari Khadka =

Nepalese footballer

Hari Bahadur Khadka
Personal information
- Full name: Hari Bahadur Khadka
- Date of birth: 26 November 1976 (age 49)
- Place of birth: Jhapa District, Nepal
- Height: 1.71 m (5 ft 7 in)
- Position: Striker

Senior career*
Years	Team	Apps	(Gls)
1994–1996	Ranipokhari Corner Team	85	(18)
1996–1997	Tollygunge Agragami	7	(9)
1997–1998	Kerala Police	28	(12)
1999	Muktijoddha Sangsad	3	(1)
1999–2000	Atlante Ciudad de México	7	(0)
2000	Prepa Pumas	29	(5)
2000–2001	Brothers Union	?	(?)
2001	Mahindra United	11	(1)
2001–2002	Mohun Bagan AC	37	(12)
2003–2006	Nepal Police Club	11	(7)
2006–2007	Żejtun Corinthians	4	(1)

International career
1995–2006	Nepal	41	(13)

Managerial career
- 2025–2026: Nepal
- * Club domestic league appearances and goals

Hari Khadka (Nepali: हरि खड्का; born 26 November 1976) is a Nepalese football coach and former player who was the head coach of Nepal national football team.

== Career statistics ==
=== International goals ===
Scores and results list Nepal's goal tally first, score column indicates score after each Nepal goal .

No.	Date	Venue	Opponent	Score	Result	Competition	Ref.
1	29 March 1995	Colombo, Sri Lanka	Pakistan		2–0	1995 South Asian Gold Cup	
2	17 June 1996	Sultan Qaboos Sports Complex, Muscat, Oman	Oman	1–2	1–2	1996 AFC Asian Cup qualification	
3	23 March 1997	Sultan Qaboos Sports Complex, Muscat, Oman	Macau		1–1	1996 AFC Asian Cup qualification	
4	27 April 1999	Fatorda Stadium, Margao, India	Maldives	1–1	2–3	1999 South Asian Football Federation Gold Cup	
5	27 April 1999	Fatorda Stadium, Margao, India	Maldives	2–3	2–3	1999 South Asian Football Federation Gold Cup	
6	26 September 1999	Dasharath Rangasala, Kathmandu, Nepal	Bhutan	1–0	7–0	1999 South Asian Games	
7	26 September 1999	Dasharath Rangasala, Kathmandu, Nepal	Bhutan	2–0	7–0	1999 South Asian Games	
8	28 September 1999	Dasharath Rangasala, Kathmandu, Nepal	Pakistan	2–1	3–1	1999 South Asian Games	
9	2 October 1999	Dasharath Rangasala, Kathmandu, Nepal	Maldives	2–0	2–1	1999 South Asian Games	
10	16 April 2001	Al-Shaab Stadium, Baghdad, Iraq	Macau	4–1	4–1	2002 FIFA World Cup qualification	
11	23 April 2001	Almaty Central Stadium, Almaty, Kazakhstan	Iraq	1–3	2–4	2002 FIFA World Cup qualification	
12	18 March 2003	Dasharath Rangasala, Kathmandu, Nepal	Afghanistan	2–0	4–0	2004 AFC Asian Cup qualification	
13	18 March 2003	Dasharath Rangasala, Kathmandu, Nepal	Afghanistan	3–0	4–0	2004 AFC Asian Cup qualification	

== Honours ==
Mahendra Police Club

- Mahendra Gold Cup: 2004
