= 2021 Three Nations Cup (Nepal) =

International football tournament

Tournament details
- Host country: Nepal
- City: Kathmandu
- Dates: 23 – 29 March 2021
- Teams: 3 (from 1 confederation)
- Venue: 1 (in 1 host city)

Final positions
- Champions: Nepal
- Runners-up: Bangladesh
- Third place: Kyrgyzstan U-23

Tournament statistics
- Matches played: 4
- Goals scored: 4 (1 per match)
- Top scorer(s): 3 players (1 goal each)
- Best player: Rohit Chand

The 2021 Three Nations Cup was a friendly international association football tournament organised and control by the All Nepal Football Association (ANFA).

== Venue ==
All matches were held at the Dasharath Rangasala in Kathmandu, Nepal.

Kathmandu	2021 Three Nations Cup (Nepal) is located in Nepal
Dasharath Rangasala	2021 Three Nations Cup (Nepal) is located in Nepal
Capacity: 15,000	2021 Three Nations Cup (Nepal) is located in Nepal

== Standings ==
Pos	Team	Pld	W	D	L	GF	GA	GD	Pts	Qualification
1	Bangladesh	2	1	1	0	1	0	+1	4	Advanced to Final
2	Nepal (H)	2	0	2	0	0	0	0	2	Advanced to Final
3	Kyrgyzstan U-23	2	0	1	1	0	1	−1	1	

Source: Nepal90
(H) Hosts

== Matches ==
=== League stage ===
23 March 2021
17:30

Kyrgyzstan U-23	0–1	Bangladesh
	Report	Baiaman 30' (o.g.)

Dasharath Rangasala, Kathmandu
Referee: Nabindra Maharjan (Nepal)

25 March 2021
17:30

Nepal	0–0	Kyrgyzstan U-23
	Report

Dasharath Rangasala, Kathmandu
Referee: Tejas Nagvenkar (India)

27 March 2021
17:30

Bangladesh	0–0	Nepal
	Report

Dasharath Rangasala, Kathmandu
Referee: Tejas Nagvenkar (India)

=== Final ===
29 March 2021
17:30

Bangladesh	1–2	Nepal
Sufil 82'	Report	Sanjog 18'; Bishal 42'

Dasharath Rangasala, Kathmandu
Referee: Tejas Nagvenkar (India)

== Statistics ==
There were 4 goals scored in 4 matches, for an average of 1 goal per match.

1 goal

- (Bangladesh) Mahbubur Rahman Sufil
- (Nepal) Bishal Rai
- (Nepal) Sanjog Rai

1 own goal

- (Kyrgyzstan) Kumarbaj Uulu Baiaman
