= 1995 SAARC Gold Cup =

Bristol SAARC Gold Cup

Tournament details
- Host country: Sri Lanka
- Dates: 25 March – 2 April
- Teams: 6
- Venue: 1 (in 1 host city)

Final positions
- Champions: Sri Lanka (1st title)
- Runners-up: India

Tournament statistics
- Matches played: 7
- Goals scored: 13 (1.86 per match)
- Top scorer: (Sri Lanka) Mohamed Amanulla (3 goals)

The 1995 South Asian Association of Regional Co-operation Gold Cup, known as the 1995 Bristol SAARC Gold Cup for sponsorship reasons, was the second international association football championship for national teams from South Asia organised by the South Asian Football Federation (SAFF). Hosted by Sri Lanka, the competition ran from 25 March to 2 April 1995 and was contested by the national teams of Bangladesh, India, Nepal, Pakistan and Sri Lanka.

The tournament began with the first match of the group stage on 25 March 1995 and ended with the final on 2 April 1995. Hosts Sri Lanka and defending champions India contested the final. Sarath Wellage scored the only goal of the match in sudden death extra time as Sri Lanka defeated India 1–0.

== Background ==
The first edition of the South Asian Football Federation Championship, known as the South Asian Association of Regional Co-operation Gold Cup, was held Lahore, Pakistan in 1993. The second edition, held in Colombo, Sri Lanka, was sponsored by the Ceylon Tobacco Company and was known as the Bristol SAARC Gold Cup.

India were the defending champions after winning the inaugural edition.

=== Participants ===
- Bangladesh
- India
- ~~Maldives~~
- Nepal
- Pakistan
- Sri Lanka

== Format ==
Originally, six teams were due to compete. They were drawn into two single round robin groups of three teams. The group winners and runners-up would contest the semi-finals which would decide which teams contested the final. After the Maldives withdrew, the format was unaltered and one group continued with just two teams.

== Venue ==
Matches were played at the Sugathadasa Stadium in Colombo.

1995 SAARC Gold Cup is located in Sri Lanka	Colombo
1995 SAARC Gold Cup is located in Sri Lanka	Sugathadasa Stadium
1995 SAARC Gold Cup is located in Sri Lanka	Capacity: 25,000

== Group stage ==
=== Group A ===
Bangladesh and Nepal advanced to the semi-finals.

==== Table ====
Pos	Team	Pld	W	D	L	GF	GA	GD	Pts	Qualification
1	Bangladesh	2	1	0	1	2	1	+1	3	Qualification for the semi-finals
2	Nepal	2	1	0	1	2	2	0	3	Qualification for the semi-finals
3	Pakistan	2	1	0	1	1	2	−1	3	

==== Matches ====
25 March 1995

Pakistan	1–0	Bangladesh
Iqbal 43'

Sugathadasa Stadium, Colombo

27 March 1995

Nepal	0–2	Bangladesh
		Mizan 8'; Rakib 26'

Sugathadasa Stadium, Colombo

29 March 1995

Nepal	2–0	Pakistan
Maharjan 20'; Khadka 87'

Sugathadasa Stadium, Colombo

=== Group B ===
Sri Lanka and India advanced to the semi-finals.

==== Table ====
Pos	Team	Pld	W	D	L	GF	GA	GD	Pts	Qualification
1	Sri Lanka	1	0	1	0	2	2	0	1 (Note: Sri Lanka placed first after toss.)	Qualification for the semi-finals
2	India	1	0	1	0	2	2	0	1	Qualification for the semi-finals
3	Maldives	0	0	0	0	0	0	0	0	Withdrew

==== Matches ====
29 March 1995

Sri Lanka	2–2	India
Amanulla 62' (pen.), 87'		Bhutia 25', 27'

Sugathadasa Stadium, Colombo
Referee: Mansur Mohammed Abul Azad (Bangladesh)

== Semi-finals ==
Sri Lanka defeated Nepal after sudden death extra time and India defeated Bangladesh on penalties.

31 March 1995

India	0–0 (a.s.d.e.t.)	Bangladesh
Penalties
	4–2

Sugathadasa Stadium, Colombo

31 March 1995

Sri Lanka	2–1 (a.s.d.e.t.)	Nepal
Amanulla 44'; Perera 120'		Amatya 50'

Sugathadasa Stadium, Colombo

== Final ==
After a goalless draw in 90 minutes, Sarath Wellage scored the golden goal in extra time as Sri Lanka defeated India 1–0.

2 April 1995

Sri Lanka	1–0 (a.s.d.e.t.)	India
Wellage 108'

Sugathadasa Stadium, Colombo
