= Football at the 1987 South Asian Games =

1987 South Asian Games Football Tournament
Tournament details
- Host country: India
- Dates: 21–26 November
- Teams: 6 (from 1 confederation)
- Venue: 1 (in 1 host city)

Final positions
- Champions: India (2nd title)
- Runners-up: Nepal
- Third place: Pakistan
- Fourth place: Bangladesh

Tournament statistics
- Matches played: 8
- Goals scored: 20 (2.5 per match)
- Top scorer(s): (Nepal) Ganesh Thapa (6 goals)

Men's football took place at the 1987 South Asian Games in Calcutta, India. India won its second title by defeating Nepal in the final and became the first team to defend the title successfully.

== Participating nations ==
Country	Appearance
India (Host)	2nd
Nepal	3rd
Pakistan	2nd
Maldives	3rd
Bangladesh	3rd
Bhutan	3rd

== Fixtures and results ==
=== Group A ===
Pos	Team	Pld	W	D	L	GF	GA	GD	Pts	Qualification
1	India	2	1	1	0	5	0	+5	3	Gold medal match
2	Pakistan	2	1	1	0	1	0	+1	3	Bronze medal match
3	Maldives	2	0	0	2	0	6	−6	0	

Source: RSSSF
21 November 1987

India	0–0	Pakistan

Salt Lake Stadium, Calcutta
22 November 1987

Pakistan	1–0	Maldives
Sharafat	Report

Salt Lake Stadium, Calcutta
23 November 1987

India	5–0	Maldives
Shareef (o.g.); Sisir; Amit Bhadra; Deepak Kumar; Krishanu

Salt Lake Stadium, Calcutta

=== Group B ===
Pos	Team	Pld	W	D	L	GF	GA	GD	Pts	Qualification
1	Nepal	2	2	0	0	7	2	+5	4	Gold medal match
2	Bangladesh	2	1	0	1	3	1	+2	2	Bronze medal match
3	Bhutan	2	0	0	2	2	9	−7	0	

Source: RSSSF
21 November 1987

Nepal	1–0	Bangladesh
Ganesh 53'	Report

Salt Lake Stadium, Calcutta
22 November 1987

Bangladesh	3–0	Bhutan
Babul 7'; Badal 77'; Ahmed Ali 81'	Report

Salt Lake Stadium, Calcutta
23 November 1987

Nepal	6–2	Bhutan
Ganesh; Mani Shah		Basnet

Salt Lake Stadium, Calcutta

== Bronze medal match ==
25 November 1987

Pakistan	1–0	Bangladesh
Sharafat 86'	Report

Salt Lake Stadium, Calcutta

== Gold medal match ==
26 November 1987

India	1–0	Nepal
Mohammed Fareed 89'	Report

Salt Lake Stadium, Calcutta
Attendance: 80,000

== Winners ==
Football at the 1987 South Asian Games

India
Second title

== Goalscorers ==
There have been 20 goals scored in 8 matches, for an average of 2.5 goals per match.

6 goals

- (Nepal) Ganesh Thapa

2 goals

- (Pakistan) Sharafat Ali
- (Nepal) Mani Shah
- (Bhutan) Khare Basnet

1 goal

- (India) Sisir Gosh
- (India) Amit Bhadra
- (India) Deepak Kumar
- (India) Krishanu Dey
- (India) Mohamed Farid
- (Bangladesh) Khurshid Alam Babul
- (Bangladesh) Badal Das
- (Bangladesh) Ahmed Ali

1 own goal

- (India) Shareef (against Maldives)
