= List of Bangladesh national football team managers =

The following is a list of Bangladesh national football team managers, first established in 1972 with the appointment of Sheikh Shaheb Ali.

== Summary ==
After the Independence of Bangladesh, a de facto national team coached by Sheikh Shaheb Ali, called Dhaka XI, was active from May 1972 to August 1972. In 1973, the Bangladesh Football Federation became affiliated with the Asian Football Confederation. In July 1973, the official Bangladesh national football team, coached by Shaheb Ali, participated in the Merdeka Tournament. In 1978, German coach, Werner Bickelhaupt was appointed for the 1978 Asian Games, making him the national team's first foreign coach. Under the joint coaching of Anwar Hossain and Anjam Hossain, Bangladesh qualified for the AFC Asian Cup in 1980 for the first and only time in its history, while Abdur Rahim remains the first and only coach to have managed the team at the tournament

Following his initial appointment for the 1975 Merdeka Tournament, Abdur Rahim holds a record of seven individual appointments, with his last coming for the 1990 Asian Games. German coach Otto Pfister holds the record of winning Bangladesh its first international trophy, the 4-nation Tiger Trophy held in Myanmar. Bangladesh won its first South Asian Games gold medal under Iraqi coach Samir Shaker in 1999 and secured its first SAFF Championship title under Austrian coach György Kottán in 2003. Spanish coach Javier Cabrera, who served as head coach from 8 January 2022 to 30 April 2026, holds the records for the most international matches managed (39) and the most victories (10) as Bangladesh head coach.

== Managerial list ==
Interim or caretaker coaches are listed in italics.

- (Bangladesh) Sheikh Shaheb Ali (1972–1973)
- (Bangladesh) Abdur Rahim (1975)
- (Bangladesh) Anjam Hossain (1976)
- (West Germany) Werner Bickelhaupt (1978)
- (Bangladesh) Anwar Hossain & (Bangladesh) Anjam Hossain (1979)
- (Bangladesh) Zakaria Pintoo (1979)
- (Bangladesh) Sheikh Shaheb Ali (1979)
- (Bangladesh) Abdur Rahim (1979–1981)
- (Bangladesh) Abdul Gafur Baloch (1982)
- (Bangladesh) Abdur Rahim (1982)
- (West Germany) Gerd Schmidt (1982)
- (Bangladesh) Abdur Rahim (1983)
- (Bangladesh) Golam Sarwar Tipu (1984)
- (Bangladesh) Ali Imam (1984)
- (Bangladesh) Abdur Rahim (1985)
- (Bangladesh) Golam Sarwar Tipu (1985)
- (Bangladesh) Kazi Salahuddin (1985–1986)
- (Bangladesh) Abdul Hakim (1986)
- (Bangladesh) Golam Sarwar Tipu (1986)
- (Bangladesh) Ali Imam (1986)
- (Bangladesh) Mohammed Kaikobad (1987)
- (Bangladesh) Wazed Gazi (1987)
- (Bangladesh) Abdur Rahim (1987)
- (Bangladesh) Kazi Salahuddin (1987–1988)
- (Bangladesh) Abdus Sadek (1989)
- (Bangladesh) Pran Govinda Kundu (1989)
- (Iran) Nasser Hejazi (1989)
- (Bangladesh) Abdur Rahim (1990)
- (Bangladesh) Shahid Uddin Ahmed Selim (1991)
- (Bangladesh) Mohammed Kaikobad (1992–1993)
- (Bangladesh) Kazi Salahuddin (1993)
- (Switzerland) Oldrich Swab (1993)
- (Bangladesh) Kazi Salahuddin (1994)
- (South Korea) Kang Man-young (1995)
- (Germany) Otto Pfister (1995–1997)
- (Bangladesh) Abu Yusuf (1998)
- (Iraq) Samir Shaker (1998–1999)
- (England) Mark Harrison (2000)
- (Bangladesh) Hasanuzzaman Bablu (2000)
- (Austria) György Kottán (2000–2003)
- (Bangladesh) Hasanuzzaman Bablu (2003)
- (Bangladesh) Golam Sarwar Tipu (2003)
- (Argentina) Andres Cruciani (2005–2006)
- (Bangladesh) Hasanuzzaman Bablu (2006)
- (India) Syed Nayeemuddin (2007–2008)
- (Bangladesh) Abu Yusuf (2008)
- (Bangladesh) Shafiqul Islam Manik (2008)
- (Brazil) Dido (2008–2009)
- (Bangladesh) Shahidur Rahman Shantoo (2009)
- (Serbia) Zoran Đorđević (2010)
- (Bangladesh) Saiful Bari Titu (2010)
- (Croatia) Robert Rubčić (2010–2011)
- (North Macedonia) Nikola Ilievski (2011)
- (Bangladesh) Saiful Bari Titu (2012)
- (Netherlands) Lodewijk de Kruif (2013–2014)
- (Bangladesh) Saiful Bari Titu (2014–2015)
- (Netherlands) Lodewijk de Kruif (2015)
- (Italy) Fabio Lopez (2015)
- (Bangladesh) Maruful Haque (2015–2016)
- (Spain) Gonzalo Sanchez Moreno (2016)
- (Netherlands) Lodewijk de Kruif (2016)
- (Belgium) Tom Saintfiet (2016)
- (England) (Australia) Andrew Ord (2017–2018)
- (England) Jamie Day (2018–2022)
- (Spain) Óscar Bruzón (2021)
- (Portugal) Mário Lemos (2021)
- (Spain) Javier Cabrera (2022–2026)
- (United States) Thomas Dooley (2026–present)

== Managerial statistics ==
As of 11 November 2026

A total of 46 managers managed Bangladesh during 68 appointments.

- Only official matches against senior international teams considered.
- List also includes managers who took charge of the national team in senior unofficial matches.

Key
Caretaker manager
Interim manager

No.	Manager	From	To	P	W	D	L	F	A	%W	Major Tournament(s)	
1	Manager	(Bangladesh) Sheikh Shaheb Ali (Note: Initially appointed in May 1972 as the head coach of Dhaka XI, which was the unofficial Bangladesh national football team as they were not a member of either FIFA or AFC. He remained incharge during the national team's first international fixture recognised by AFC, on 26 July 1973 against Thailand in the Merdeka Cup.)	May 1972	August 1973	7	1	3	3	6	14	14.29	—
2	(Bangladesh) Abdur Rahim	July 1975	August 1975	7	0	1	6	3	31	0.00	—	
3	(Bangladesh) Anjam Hossain	December 1976	December 1976	1	0	0	1	0	6	0.00	—	
4	(West Germany) Werner Bickelhaupt	July 1978	December 1978	2	0	0	2	0	4	0.00	1978 Asian Games group stage	
5	(Bangladesh) Anwar Hossain & (Bangladesh) Anjam Hossain	February 1979	March 1979	4	1	2	1	7	8	25.00	—	
6	(Bangladesh) Zakaria Pintoo (Note: Does not include the 1–0 defeat to the South Korean national B team in an unofficial friendly played in Dhaka, Bangladesh, on 20 July 1979.)	June 1979	July 1979	0	0	0	0	0	0	—	—	
7	(Bangladesh) Sheikh Shaheb Ali	August 1979	September 1979	4	1	0	3	4	16	25.00	—	
8	(Bangladesh) Abdur Rahim	October 1979	May 1981	5	0	1	4	3	18	0.00	1980 AFC Asian Cup group stage	
9	(Bangladesh) Gafur Baloch (Note: Originally from Pakistan, he was eventually granted Bangladeshi citizenship and travelled as the national head coach with a Bangladeshi passport.)	January 1982	February 1982	4	0	1	3	3	15	0.00	—	
10	(Bangladesh) Abdur Rahim (Note: Does not include the games played in the 1982 Bangladesh President's Gold Cup as they were not against senior national teams.)	August 1982	August 1982	0	0	0	0	0	0	—	—	
11	(West Germany) Gerd Schmidt	September 1982	November 1982	3	1	0	2	2	4	33.33	1982 Asian Games group stage	
12	(Bangladesh) Abdur Rahim	August 1983	September 1983	5	2	1	2	5	4	40.00	—	
13	(Bangladesh) Golam Sarwar Tipu	July 1984	August 1984	5	1	0	4	6	13	20.00	—	
14	(Bangladesh) Ali Imam	August 1984	September 1984	4	3	0	1	14	4	75.00	1984 South Asian Games runner-up	
15	(Bangladesh) Abdur Rahim	25 January 1985	12 April 1985	6	2	0	4	5	10	33.33	—	
16	(Bangladesh) Golam Sarwar Tipu	April 1985	May 1985	3	1	1	1	4	3	33.33	—	
17	(Bangladesh) Kazi Salahuddin (Note: Does not include the games played in the 1986 Bangladesh President's Gold Cup as they were not against senior national teams.)	November 1985	January 1986	3	2	1	0	11	2	66.67	1985 South Asian Games runner-up	
18	(Bangladesh) Abdul Hakim	March 1986	March 1986	1	1	0	0	1	0	100.00	—	
19	(Bangladesh) Golam Sarwar Tipu	August 1986	September 1986	4	1	0	3	1	12	25.00	1986 Asian Games group stage	
20	(Bangladesh) Ali Imam (Note: Mohammedan SC played as the national team in the Nepal Panchayat Silver Jubilee Cup 1986, with players and coach all being members of the club.)	December 1986	December 1986	2	0	1	1	1	2	0.00	—	
21	(Bangladesh) Mohammed Kaikobad	January 1987	February 1987	1	0	1	0	2	2	0.00	—	
22	(Bangladesh) Wazed Gazi (Note: Does not include the games played at the 1987 Quaid-e-Azam International Tournament as they were not against senior national teams.)	September 1987	September 1987	0	0	0	0	0	0	—	—	
23	(Bangladesh) Abdur Rahim	October 1987	November 1987	3	1	0	2	3	2	33.33	1987 South Asian Games fourth place	
24	(Bangladesh) Kazi Salahuddin	December 1987	February 1988	5	0	3	2	1	9	0.00	—	
25	(Bangladesh) Abdus Sadek (Note: Does not include the games played in the 1989 Bangladesh President's Gold Cup as they were not against senior national teams.)	January 1989	January 1989	0	0	0	0	0	0	—	—	
26	(Bangladesh) Pran Govinda Kundu	February 1989	March 1989	6	1	0	5	4	9	16.67	—	
27	(Iran) Nasser Hejazi	September 1989	October 1989	3	1	1	1	4	2	33.33	1989 South Asian Games runner-up	
28	(Bangladesh) Abdur Rahim	September 1990	October 1990	2	0	0	2	0	7	0.00	1990 Asian Games group stage	
29	(Bangladesh) Shahiduddin Ahmed Selim	December 1991	December 1991	3	2	0	1	4	2	66.67	1991 South Asian Games third place	
30	(Bangladesh) Mohammed Kaikobad (Note: Does not include the games played in the 1993 Bangladesh President's Gold Cup as they were not against senior national teams.)	June 1992	January 1993	2	0	0	2	0	7	0.00	—	
31	(Bangladesh) Kazi Salahuddin	March 1993	May 1993	8	2	0	6	7	28	25.00	—	
32	(Switzerland) Oldrich Swab	November 1993	December 1993	4	2	1	1	6	3	50.00	1993 South Asian Games group stage	
33	(Bangladesh) Kazi Salahuddin (Note: Muktijoddha Sangsad KC played as the national team in the Qatar Independence Cup 1994, with players and coach all being members of the club.)	September 1994	September 1994	2	1	0	1	3	4	50.00	—	
34	(South Korea) Kang Man-young	March 1995	March 1995	3	1	1	1	2	1	33.33	1995 SAARC Gold Cup third place	
35	(Germany) Otto Pfister	October 1995	September 1997	15	4	3	8	10	25	26.67	1995 South Asian Games runner-up 1997 SAFF Gold Cup group stage	
36	(Bangladesh) Abu Yusuf	July 1998	July 1998	1	0	1	0	0	0	0.00		
37	(Iraq) Samir Shaker	1 October 1998	December 1999	12	6	2	4	15	17	50.00	1999 SAFF Gold Cup runner-up 1999 South Asian Games champions	
38	(England) Mark Harrison	April 2000	May 2000	3	0	2	1	2	3	0.00	—	
39	(Bangladesh) Hasanuzzaman Bablu	July 2000	August 2000	1	0	0	1	0	1	0.00	—	
40	(Austria) György Kottán	November 2000	20 January 2003	13	6	3	4	16	20	46.15	2003 SAFF Gold Cup champions	
41	(Bangladesh) Hasanuzzaman Bablu	27 March 2003	30 March 2003	2	0	1	1	3	4	0.00	—	
42	(Bangladesh) Golam Sarwar Tipu	22 November 2003	December 2003	2	0	0	2	0	4	0.00	—	
43	(Argentina) Andres Cruciani (Note: Does not include the games played in the Myanmar Grand Royal Challenge Cup as they were played by the B national team.)	3 August 2005	10 April 2006	13	6	3	4	15	17	46.15	2005 SAFF Gold Cup runner-up	
44	(Bangladesh) Hasanuzzaman Bablu	July 2006	November 2006	4	0	0	4	1	13	0.00	—	
45	(India) Syed Nayeemuddin (Note: In August 2007, Bangladesh Football Federation (BFF) operated two separate national teams and sent one to participate in the 2007 Nehru Cup under main national team head coach Syed Nayeemuddin, while the other team which was sent to the 2007 Merdeka Cup, presumably a national B team, was managed by caretaker coach, Hasanuzzaman Bablu. None of the games played in Malaysia were against senior national teams.)	1 August 2007	25 November 2007	6	0	2	4	2	13	0.00	—	
46	(Bangladesh) Abu Yusuf	4 March 2008	18 June 2008	5	0	3	2	4	6	0.00	2008 SAFF Championship group stage	
47	(Bangladesh) Shafiqul Islam Manik	4 August 2008	13 November 2008	3	0	1	2	0	3	0.00	—	
48	(Brazil) Dido	31 December 2008	9 November 2009	3	2	0	1	5	2	66.67	—	
49	(Bangladesh) Shahidur Rahman Shantoo	9 November 2009	11 December 2009	4	2	1	1	6	3	50.00	2009 SAFF Championship semi-final	
50	(Serbia) Zoran Đorđević (Note: Initially appointed as the senior national team head coach and took charge of Bangladesh U23 in the 2010 South Asian Games, however was sacked before managing the senior national team.)	5 January 2010	14 February 2010	0	0	0	0	0	0	—	—	
51	(Bangladesh) Saiful Bari Titu	16 February 2010	20 February 2010	3	1	0	2	3	6	33.33	2010 AFC Challenge Cup group stage	
52	(Croatia) Robert Rubčić	3 September 2010	2 June 2011	3	1	0	2	2	5	33.33	—	
53	(North Macedonia) Nikola Ilievski	24 June 2011	22 December 2011	7	2	2	3	6	8	28.57	2011 SAFF Championship group stage	
54	(Bangladesh) Saiful Bari Titu	2 September 2012	20 November 2012	3	0	2	1	2	7	0.00	—	
55	(Netherlands) Lodewijk de Kruif	29 January 2013	14 October 2014	7	2	2	3	10	8	28.57	2013 SAFF Championship group stage	
56	(Bangladesh) Saiful Bari Titu	18 October 2014	27 October 2014	2	1	1	0	2	1	50.00	—	
57	(Netherlands) Lodewijk de Kruif	24 January 2015	8 September 2015	8	1	3	4	5	16	12.50	—	
58	(Italy) Fabio Lopez	11 September 2015	24 November 2015	3	0	0	3	0	11	0.00	—	
59	(Bangladesh) Maruful Haque	25 November 2015	18 January 2016	6	3	1	2	9	9	50.00	2015 SAFF Championship group stage	
60	(Spain) Gonzalo Moreno	23 February 2016	24 March 2016	2	0	0	2	1	14	0.00	—	
61	(Netherlands) Lodewijk de Kruif	7 May 2016	7 June 2016	2	0	0	2	0	6	0.00	—	
62	(Belgium) Tom Saintfiet	26 June 2016	10 October 2016	3	0	1	2	1	8	0.00	—	
63	(England) (Australia) Andrew Ord	18 May 2017	4 April 2018	1	0	1	0	2	2	0.00	—	
64	(England) Jamie Day	17 May 2018	17 September 2021	29	9	5	15	22	38	31.03	2018 SAFF Championship group stage	
65	(Spain) Óscar Bruzón	17 September 2021	20 October 2021	4	1	2	1	3	4	25.00	2021 SAFF Championship group stage	
66	(Portugal) Mário Lemos	21 October 2021	7 January 2022	3	1	1	1	4	4	33.33	—	
67	(Spain) Javier Cabrera	8 January 2022	30 April 2026	39	10	10	19	30	58	25.64	2023 SAFF Championship semi-final	
68	(United States) Thomas Dooley	22 May 2026	Present	6	3	0	3	9	14	50.00	—	

== See also ==
- Football in Bangladesh
- Bangladesh national football team results
