= Hasanuzzaman Khan Bablu =

Bangladeshi footballer

Hasanuzzaman Bablu
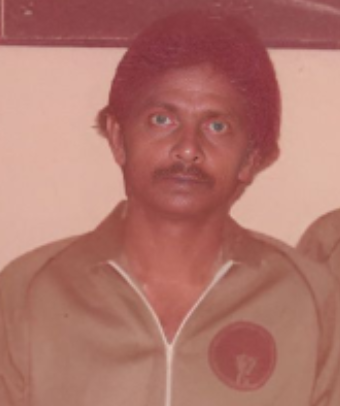
- Bablu with Muktijoddha Sangsad KC teammates in Nepal for the ANFA Cup, 1985

Personal information
- Full name: Mohamed Hasanuzzaman Khan Bablu
- Date of birth: 5 May 1955 (age 71)
- Place of birth: Rajshahi, East Bengal, Pakistan (present-day Bangladesh)
- Height: 1.73 m (5 ft 8 in)
- Positions: Central midfielder; attacking midfielder

Youth career
- 1972–1973: Brothers Union (Youth team)

Senior career*
Years	Team	Apps	(Gls)
1973–1982	Brothers Union		
1983	Mohammedan		
1984	Dhaka Abahani		
1985	Dhaka Wanderers		
1986	Brothers Union		

International career
1978–1980	Bangladesh U19		
1975–1982	Bangladesh		

Managerial career
- 1992: Bangladesh U16
- 1997–1998: Brothers Union
- 1998: Bangladesh U19
- 1999: Dhaka Abahani
- 1999–2000: Mohammedan
- 2000: Bangladesh (interim)
- 2003: Bangladesh (interim)
- 2006: Bangladesh (interim)
- 2006: Bangladesh U23
- 2007: Bangladesh B
- * Club domestic league appearances and goals

Hasanuzzaman Khan Bablu (Bengali: হাসানুজ্জামান খান বাবলু; born 5 May 1955) is a retired Bangladeshi football player and coach. At the club level, Bablu is most well known for representing Gopibagh-based Brothers Union. In domestic football, he has scored 75 goals including a hat-trick. Bablu also represented the Bangladesh national team in the 1980 AFC Asian Cup and played for his country between 1975 and 1982. After retiring, he managed the national team as an interim in 2000, 2003 and 2006.

== Early life ==
Born in Rajshahi, Bangladesh, Bablu started his football career while studying in Sirajganj, where he won the best player award in an interschool football tournament. Bablu's father, A Z Khan, was a police superintendent while his mother, Nurjahan Begum, was a housewife. He grew up with five brothers and two sisters. His brother-in-law, Abul Kashem, was the director of WAPDA SC and provided financial support to Bablu during the early stages of his career.

== Club career ==
=== Early career ===
In 1972, when Brothers Union coach Abdul Gafur Baloch started gathering players for the club's youth team, alongside Mohammed Mohsin, Bablu became one of the first products of the youth team to make his way into the main squad. The following year he played for the club in the Dhaka Third Division League, which was the first time Brothers Union entered professional football after the 1971 Liberation War. Over the next two years, Bablu became one of the highest goalscorers in both of Dhaka's Third Division and Second Division, as Brothers achieved consecutive promotions to enter the First Division in 1975. His combination with Mohsin was an integral part to the club's success, with Mohsin becoming the top-scorer during both of their lower division title triumphs.

=== Prime at Brothers Union ===
Bablu quickly made a name for himself when the newly promoted Brothers made their top-flight debut in 1975, claiming a 1–0 victory over defending champions Abahani Krira Chakra. In 1976, during a league game against East End Club, Bablu who had scored two goals already, dribbled past the entire East End defence only to bring the ball back to his own half and sit on top of it. Bablu claimed to have challenged the opponent players to take the ball off of him, however following his antics the referee booked Bablu, who was then immediately substituted.

"You idiot, you insulted eleven East End players. If I had not taken you off, they would have beaten you together."

— Brothers Union coach Abdul Gafur Baloch's reaction to Bablu's stunt against East End Club

Bablu attracted the interest of Sheikh Kamal, who invited him to join Abahani, and though the deal was agreed by both clubs it later collapsed after the 15 August 1975 coup d'état. Although during his time with the Oranges he failed to win the league title, Bablu was part of the Brothers team that were joint champions of the first edition of the Federation Cup in 1980, during which he was the club captain. Bablu was also part of the team that became the first Bangladeshi side to win the Aga Khan Gold Cup, although both titles were shared with Mohammedan SC and Bangkok Bank, respectively. During their Aga Khan Gold Cup triumph, Bablu scored in the semi-final against Oman XI in a 3–1 victory.

=== Later years ===
In 1983, Bablu left Brothers Union after Mohammed Mohsin's injury lead to a slump in the club's form. Bablu joined Mohammedan SC, where he won the 1983 Federation Cup, however, Bablu could not replicate the performances he had with Brothers. The following year Bablu changed clubs again, joining Abahani Krira Chakra where he regained his form. With Abahani, Bablu won his only First Division title during his lone year at the club, before moving to Dhaka Wanderers in 1985. In the same year, he represented Muktijoddha Sangsad KC as a guest player at the ANFA Cup in Nepal. Bablu returned to Brothers Union in 1986, and retired the same year.

== International career ==
In 1975, the same year when Brothers Union made their top-tier debut, Bablu got a national team call-up from Abdur Rahim who was the Bangladesh's coach at the time. Bablu travelled with the team to Malaysia where they took part in the Merdeka Cup. Bablu then played for the Bangladesh U19 team at the 1978 AFC Youth Championship in Dhaka. He also captained the U19 team during the qualifiers for the 1980 AFC Youth Championship under his club coach, Gafur Baloch. Bablu guided the youth national team to qualification as they finished group runners-up behind Qatar U19.

He represented the senior team at the 1978 Asian Games and the 1979 Korean President's Cup. Bablu was also part of the national team during the qualifiers and the main stage of the 1980 AFC Asian Cup. He represented the Bangladesh Red team, during the first Bangladesh President's Gold Cup, in 1981. Bablu's last appearance for the national team was in a 0–9 defeat to Iran, at Pakistan's Quaid-E-Azam International Cup (1982).

== Coaching career ==
Bablu started his coaching career with the Bangladesh U16 national team and helped them qualify for the 1992 AFC U-16 Championship. He coached Brothers Union in 1997, before spending a month with Abahani Limited Dhaka as an interim coach. His greatest success as a coach came with Mohammedan SC. Bablu lead the club to their 18th Dhaka Premier Division League title in 1999. In the same year, Mohammedan defeated East Bengal in the final of the All Airlines Gold Cup.

In 2000, Bablu was the interim head coach of the Bangladesh national team, during the a friendly match held in London against India, and also during the 2004 AFC Asian Cup qualifiers held in Hong Kong. In July 2006, he replaced Andrés Cruciani as Bangladesh interim head coach, for the second half of the 2007 AFC Asian Cup qualifiers. He served as the head coach of the Bangladesh U23 team during the 2006 Asian Games in Doha.

In 2007, he managed Bangladesh at the 2007 Merdeka Cup, in which were all non FIFA matches. Concurrently the main national team participated in the 2007 Nehru Cup under main head coach Syed Nayeemuddin, thus the Malaysia bound team is considered to be the national B team.

== Personal life ==
In 1980, Bablu married the younger sister of his Brothers Union teammate Shahiduddin Ahmed Selim.

In 2006, Bablu received the National Sports Award.

He also served as the president of Sonali Otit Club (organization of former footballers).

== Honours ==
=== Player ===
Brothers Union

- Dhaka Third Division League: 1973
- Dhaka Second Division League: 1974
- Federation Cup: 1980
- Aga Khan Gold Cup: 1981–82

Mohammedan SC

- Federation Cup: 1983

Abahani Krira Chakra

- Dhaka First Division League: 1984

=== Manager ===
Mohammedan SC

- Dhaka Premier Division League: 1999
- All Airlines Gold Cup: 1999

=== Awards and accolades ===
- 1999 − Sports Writers Association's Best Football Coach Award
- 2006 − National Sports Award

== See also ==
- List of Bangladesh national football team managers
