= Abdul Gafur Baloch =

Pakistani footballer and manager

Gafur Baloch
- Baloch's retirement in 1987

Personal information
- Full name: Abdul Gafur Baloch
- Date of birth: 1936
- Place of birth: Karachi, British India (present-day Pakistan)
- Date of death: 25 June 1997 (aged 61)
- Place of death: Dhaka, Bangladesh
- Position: Centre-back

Senior career*
Years	Team	Apps	(Gls)
1951–	Qadri Sports Club		
–1958	Karachi Kickers		
1959–1965	Dhaka Wanderers		
1966–1968	EPIDC		
1969–1971	Dhaka Wanderers		
1972–1973	BDIC		

International career
1959–1963	East Pakistan		
1961–1963	Pakistan		

Managerial career
- 1968: EPIDC
- 1972–1983: Brothers Union
- 1973: BIDC
- 1980–1981: Bangladesh U19
- 1981: Bangladesh B
- 1982: Bangladesh
- 1984–1985: Muktijoddha Sangsad
- 1986: Brothers Union
- * Club domestic league appearances and goals

Abdul Gafur Baloch (1936–25 June 1997) was a football player and coach. Born in Pakistan during the British regime, he was granted Bangladeshi citizenship due to his contribution to the country's football. Gafur was praised for his defensive abilities during his playing years.

== Early life ==
Born in Karachi, British India in 1936, Baloch was of Iranian origin on his mother's side.

== Playing career ==
In 1951, at the age of 15, he began playing in the Karachi First Division Football League with Qadri Sports Club. In 1958, Baloch won the Aga Khan Gold Cup in Dhaka with Karachi Kickers in what was the tournament's first edition.

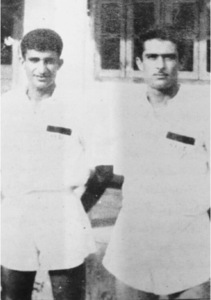
Baloch (right) during his playing days at Dhaka Wanderers

Baloch represented the Pakistan national team from 1961 to 1963. He made his debut during three exhibition games against Burma in Karachi. He was also part of the runners-up team in the 1962 Merdeka Cup. In 1963, Baloch played a series of friendly games against China, marking his final appearances for Pakistan.

Baloch began his Dhaka First Division League journey by joining Dhaka Wanderers in 1959. He won the league title the following year before moving to the then newly promoted, EPIDC. He won the club the league title in both 1968 and 1973, as coach-cum-player. He was the club captain in 1967 and 1968.

In 1960, Baloch won the National Football Championship while representing East Pakistan. His team defeated Karachi White 1–0 in the final held on November 27 in his place of birth, Karachi. In 1962, Baloch, representing Victoria SC as a guest player, once again won the Aga Khan Gold Cup.

== Coaching career ==
Baloch won the First Division League as coach-cum-player of EPIDC (later BIDC) in both 1968 and 1973 while also training Gopibagh-based club, Brothers Union, as an unpaid coach on the recommendation of the club's captain Shahid Uddin Ahmed Selim and founding secretary, A. B. M. Musa. In the late 60s, both Musa and Baloch assisted Sheikh Kamal in the formation of Abahani Krira Chakra. In the early years of Brothers Union following the Independence of Bangladesh, Baloch conducted training camps in a four-storey building at 48 Ramakrishna Mission Road, Gopibagh, owned by Selim's older brother, Saifuddin Ahmed Manik.

In 1973 and 1974, he coached the Oranges to victory in the Dhaka Third Division Football League and Dhaka Second Division Football League, respectively. During both title triumphs, Brothers remained unbeaten and were composed entirely of under-18 players scouted from Gopibagh by Baloch himself. Notable players in the team were Hasanuzzaman Khan Bablu and Mohammed Mohsin, the latter winning the top scorer award during both title triumphs. During those two years, Baloch's all-out attacking tactic saw Brothers not fail to score fewer than six goals in each game and also record a victory with a nineteen-goal margin while in the Third Division.

In 1975, Brothers Union entered the First Division, and in their inaugural top division league game, they defeated reigning champions Abahani 1–0. In the same year, Baloch suffered his first defeat as coach of the Oranges, conceding to a late goal against Mohammedan SC. The club finished fourth that season as, Baloch would eventually lead them to a runners-up finish in 1978 and a hat-trick of third-place finishes from 1979 to 1981. Baloch also managed Brothers' junior team in the Pioneer League and eventually promoted the same players to the senior team, most notably winger Khandoker Wasim Iqbal, who played an integral role in the club's 1981–82 Aga Khan Gold Cup triumph as joint champions alongside Bangkok Bank. Baloch also won Brothers the 1980 Federation Cup jointly with Mohammedan.

In December 1980, Baloch took charge of the Bangladesh U19 team for the 1980 AFC Youth Championship qualifiers held in Dhaka at the Dhaka Stadium. Captained by Brothers Union winger, Hasanuzzaman Khan Bablu, the team defeated Nepal U19 5–1, Oman U19 2–0, and India U19 1–0. The team qualified for the main event as group runners-up behind Qatar U19, to whom they had lost 1–2. Nonetheless, the team disappointed during the 1980 AFC Youth Championship held in February 1981, in Bangkok, finishing bottom of the table while salvaging one point from four games, a 1–1 draw with South Korea U19.

In March 1981, Baloch was appointed as the head coach of the Bangladesh B national team for the inaugural Bangladesh President's Gold Cup held in Dhaka. The team, referred to as Bangladesh Red, comprised players who had participated in the AFC Youth Championship under Baloch the previous month. Notable faces included Ashish Bhadra, Sheikh Mohammad Aslam, Hasanuzzaman Khan Bablu and Lal Mohammad. The team finished the group stages with 1–0 victories over both Oman XI and Thailand XI, while also securing a 1–1 draw with South Korea XI. In the semi-finals, the team defeated North Korea XI on penalties after a 1–1 draw. In the final held on 1 March, the Red team was defeated 2–0 by South Korea. Nonetheless, Baloch's Red team outshone Bangladesh's senior national team during the tournament, for which he was honored with the head coach duty for the Bangladesh national team in 1982.

In February 1982, Baloch traveled back to his country of birth, Pakistan, as the head coach of the Bangladesh national team for the 1982 Quaid-e-Azam International Tournament held in Karachi. Baloch's team mainly consisting of players from the Red team of the previous year, disappointed during the tournament, suffering embarrassing defeats to Pakistan Junior national team 2–1 and Iran 9–0, the latter being the country's joint heaviest defeat. The team captained by Ashrafuddin Ahmed Chunnu finished the tournament bottom of the table with 2 points from 6 games. It was also reported that Baloch, who was granted Bangladeshi citizenship due to his contribution to the establishment of Abahani Krira Chakra, had traveled to Pakistan with a Bangladeshi passport.

In 1984, Baloch joined the newly promoted First Division outfit, Muktijoddha Sangsad, marking an end to his decade-long stint as Brothers Union coach. At Muktijoddha, Baloch nurtured the likes of Monem Munna and Shahinur Kabir Shimul, as the Freedom Fighters finished seventh and eighth, respectively, during his two seasons in charge. In 1986, he returned to Brothers where he ended his coaching career with a third-place finish. On 23 June 1987, a charity match was held between Abahani and Brothers Union on the occasion of his official retirement. The game ended in a 1–1 draw, with Abahani taking the lead through PremLal in the 24th minute before Mamun Babu equalized towards the game's conclusion. Baloch was also rewarded with Tk 2 lakh 50 thousand raised from the encounter, with which he would live out the rest of his life.

== Personal life ==
Following the Independence of Bangladesh, Baloch opted not to return to Pakistan. He was eventually granted Bangladeshi citizenship under the recommendation of A. B. M. Musa. Despite being a child of a wealthy family from Karachi, he embraced a life of poverty, living the rest of his life in Gopibagh, Bangladesh.

In 1971, former Pakistan national team captain, Qayyum Changezi, came to Dhaka to take him back; however, Baloch refused. It was also reported that one of his brothers, a general of the Pakistan Army, suffered the same fate while trying to get Baloch to return to Pakistan, with Baloch declaring "Ainda kabhi na aou, hum Pakistan nahi jainge" (lit. 'Don't come back again, I will not go to Pakistan.').

Baloch was also credited to have assisted the Mukti Bahini during the Bangladesh Liberation War in 1971. Using his status as a former Pakistan national team player, Baloch saved the lives of many Bengalis in Gopibagh. He also stored weapons used by the resistance in his own house in Gopibagh.

An army officer used to play with me. Always doubted me. He used to come to me and say, I have sheltered the freedom fighters. He would sneak into the room, but never check strictly.

— Kazi Salahuddin, former Bangladesh captain, quoting Baloch from 1973.

Even after retirement as a coach, Baloch lived the rest of his life as a bachelor, during an interview by sports magazine Krira Jagat he stated, "Kya hoga shaadi banake, akeli hu, achii toh hu. Yes, football is my sansar-mokam bibi baccha" (lit. 'What will happen if I get married, I am happy being alone. Yes, football is my family, (my) wife and child.'). He also financially helped numerous residents of Gopibagh, and lived out his retirement life in a two-room house provided by a family in the area.

On 25 June 1997, at 11:30 pm, aged 61, Baloch died while undergoing treatment at the Dhaka Medical College Hospital. He was laid to rest in the Gopibagh cemetery.

== Legacy ==
On 3 September 2008, the Bangladesh Football Federation inaugurated the Abdur Rahim-Gafoor Baloch Memorial Futsal competition in memory of Baloch and fellow national coach Abdur Rahim.

== Honours ==
=== Player ===
Karachi Kickers

- Aga Khan Gold Cup: 1958

Dhaka Wanderers

- Dhaka First Division League: 1960

East Pakistan

- National Football Championship: 1960

Pakistan

- Merdeka Tournament runner-up: 1962

Victoria SC

- Aga Khan Gold Cup: 1962

=== Manager ===
BIDC

- Dhaka First Division League: 1968, 1973

Brothers Union

- Dhaka Third Division League: 1973
- Dhaka Second Division League: 1974
- Federation Cup: 1980
- Aga Khan Gold Cup: 1981–82

Bangladesh B/Red

- President's Gold Cup runner-up: 1981

Individual

- 1984 − Sports Writers Association's Best Coach Award

== See also ==
- List of Bangladesh national football team managers

== Bibliography ==
- Dulal, Mahmud (2014). পাকিস্তান জাতীয় দল বাঙালি খেলোয়াড় (transl. Bengali players in the Pakistan national team) (in Bengali). Bishhoshahitto Bhobon.
- Dulal, Mahmud (2020). খেলার মাঠে মুক্তিযুদ্ধ (transl. Liberation war in the playground) (in Bengali). Bishhoshahitto Bhobon. ISBN 978-984-8218-31-0.
- Alam, Masud (2017). ফুটবলের গল্প ফুটবলারদের গল্প (transl. The story of football the story of footballers) (in Bengali). Bishhoshahitto Bhobon. ISBN 9789849134688.
