= Mohammed Kaikobad =

Bangladeshi footballer (born 1946)

Personal information
- Full name: Mohammed Kaikobad
- Date of birth: 15 July 1946 (age 80)
- Place of birth: Brahmanbaria, Bengal, British India (present-day Bangladesh)
- Height: 1.63 m (5 ft 4 in)
- Positions: Centre-back; defensive midfielder

Senior career*
| Years | Team | Apps | (Gls) |
| 1964–1966 | EPG Press | | |
| 1967–1968 | Rahmatganj | | |
| 1969–1977 | Mohammedan | | |

International career
| 1971 | Shadhin Bangla | | |
| 1973 | Bangladesh | | |

Managerial career
- 1982–1992: Mohammedan (assistant)
- 1987: Bangladesh
- 1992: Bangladesh
- * Club domestic league appearances and goals

Mohammed Kaikobad (Bengali: মোহাম্মদ কায়কোবাদ; born 15 July 1946) is a retired Bangladeshi football player and coach.

== Early career ==
Kaikobad began his football career after completing his matriculation exams in 1961 by joining the junior team of Kazipara Union Club. The following year, he played in the Brahmanbaria First Division Football League with Kazipara's senior team. In 1963, he participated in the Cumilla First Division Football League with Cumilla East Bengal and represented the Cumilla District in the inter-district football championship under the recommendation of Zahirul Haque.

== Club career ==
In 1964, he was invited to play for East Pakistan Government Press in the Dhaka First Division Football League by the club's striker Azab Ali. Initially, the Press team hesitated to play Kaikobad as a central defender due to his small stature; however, he cemented his position after his impressive performance in his debut game against Dhaka Wanderers on 30 May 1964, which saw the club end their six-game winless run. He was made club captain in 1966, and the following year, he joined Rahmatganj MFS, where he spent two seasons.

In 1965, Kaikobad trialed for the East Pakistan youth football team for Lahore. The following year, he won the inter-district football tournament with the Cumilla District team. In 1968, he played for the Dhaka University team that won the East Pakistan inter-university knockout competition under the leadership of Zakaria Pintoo. In 1969, Kaikobad featured in the East Pakistan Combined University team at the East Zone of the National Football Championship. The team then went on to participate in the main round in Lahore. During the 1969–70 edition of the tournament, Kaikobad played for Chittagong Division, the eventual champions.

In 1969, Kaikobad joined Mohammedan SC and played there until his retirement. He won the First Division League title in 1969, 1975, and 1976. He also played for Mohammedan during a 0–1 defeat to the touring Mohun Bagan AC on 11 May 1972 at the Dhaka Stadium. Kaikobad was also part of the team that won the inaugural Independence Cup in 1972, starting in the final against East End Club in their eventual 3–1 victory. He also captained the club in 1977, which was his final year as an active player due to a recurring knee injury.

== International career ==
=== Shadhin Bangla ===
On 5 March 1971, after returning from Multan with the Chittagong Division team after taking part in the National Football Championship, Kaikobad witnessed the early stages of Operation Searchlight and subsequently moved to Comilla. He then went to Agartala, India, to join the Melaghar Camp for the Bangladesh Liberation War. There he met East Pakistan Press footballer Subhas Saha and joined Birendra Club in the Tripura Football League, along with Nowsheruzzaman and Enayetur Rahman. While at Birendra Club, they were invited by the Bangladesh Sports Association to join the Shadhin Bangla football team at Mujibnagar. Before leaving, Kaikobad captained Joy Bangla XI in an exhibition match against Tripura XI on 4 July, which ended in a 1–2 defeat. Kaikobad was included in the starting lineup for the Shadhin Bangla football team's inaugural match against Nadia XI in the Nadia district of West Bengal on 25 July 1971. The game ended in a 2–2 draw as the team went on to play a total of 16 friendly matches to raise international awareness and economic support for the liberation war.

=== Dhaka XI ===
After the Independence of Bangladesh, Kaikobad returned to the country and participated in the first football match held post-independence on 13 February 1972. He played for Bangladesh XI against President XI. Despite comprising former members of the Shadhin Bangla football team, the experienced squad suffered a 2–0 defeat. On 13 May 1972, two days after their match against Mohammedan, Mohun Bagan AC, the first foreign football club to visit independent Bangladesh, played against "Dhaka XI," the unofficial Bangladesh national team. The game, held at the Dhaka Stadium, ended in a 1–0 victory for the Dhaka side, with Kaikobad assisting the winning goal scored by Kazi Salahuddin. In August of that year, he travelled to India's Guwahati with Dhaka XI, to take part in the Bordoloi Trophy. The team finished runners-up after defeat to East Bengal Club in the final. On 5 and 11 October 1972, Kaikobad featured for Dhaka XI in two goalless draws against East Bengal Club at the Dhaka Stadium.

=== Bangladesh ===
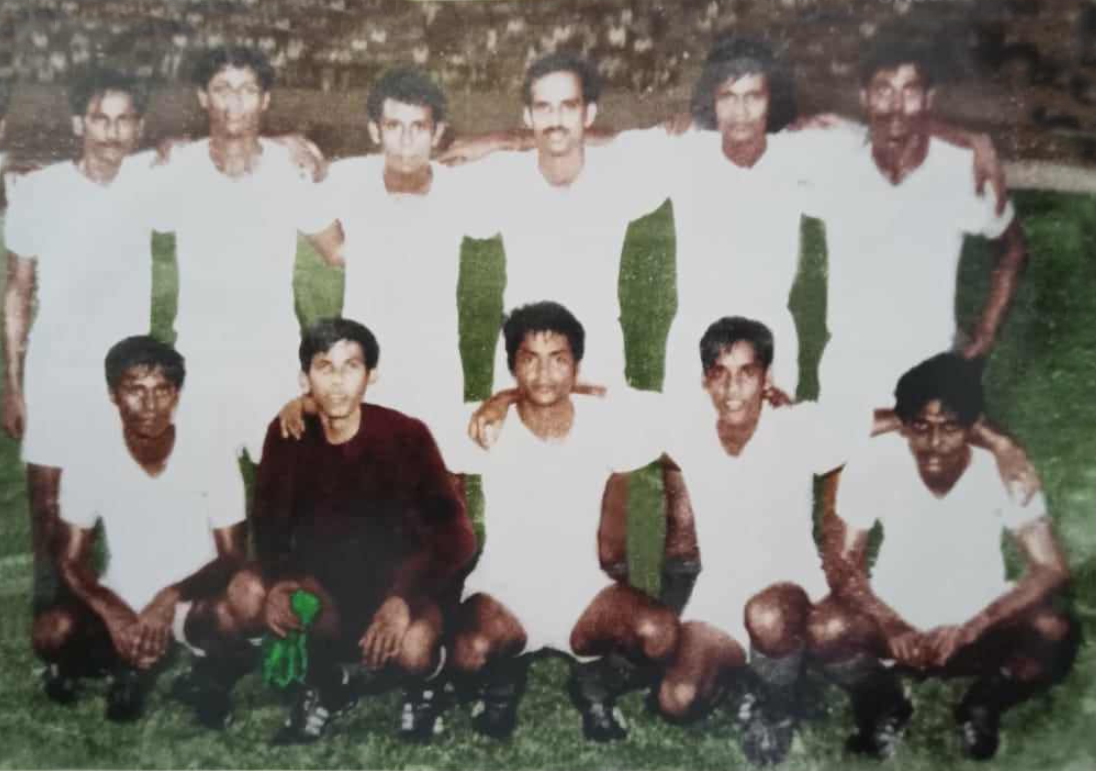
Kaikobad (standing first from the left) with the national team at the 1973 Merdeka Cup in Malaysia.

On 27 July 1973, Kaikobad made his debut for the Bangladesh national football team during its inaugural international game, a 2–2 draw with Thailand at Malaysia's 1973 Merdeka Cup. The team played six matches in the tournament along with a friendly match against Singapore on their way back, which resulted in their first international victory. Kaikobad missed the 1975 edition of the tournament due to a knee injury, which eventually marked the end of his international career.

== Coaching career ==
Kaikobad served as the general manager and organizer of Mohammedan SC following his retirement in 1977. He began serving as assistant coach in 1982 under head coach Golam Sarwar Tipu, after completing his coaching diploma from Patiala. He remained involved in the club's coaching panel as either assistant or permanent head coach until 1992. He also helped Mohammedan get past the first two rounds of the 1991 Asian Club Championship, in home and away fixtures against Pakistan's WAPDA FC and Maldive's New Radiant, in the absence of head coach, Nasser Hejazi. He also served as head coach of the Bangladesh national team in both 1987 and 1992. He first took charge of the team at the 1987 President's Gold Cup held in Dhaka, where the team, composed of Mohammedan players, competed under the name "Bangladesh White". His final stint as national coach came during the 1992 AFC Asian Cup qualification held in Bangkok, Thailand. Bangladesh lost both qualification games 0–6 and 0–1 to South Korea and Thailand, finishing at the bottom of their group.

== Personal life ==
Kaikobad majored in Bachelor of Arts at Jagannath College and eventually took up a job at the Dhaka City Corporation in 1967. He retired in 2003.

In July 2019, it was reported that Kaikobad has been suffering from Parkinson's disease.

== Honours ==
Mohammedan SC

- Dhaka First Division League: 1969, 1975, 1976
- Independence Cup: 1972

Chittagong Division

- National Football Championship: 1970

Individual

- 2001 − National Sports Awards
- 2018 − Rupchada Prothom Alo Award 2018

== See also ==
- List of Bangladesh national football team managers

== Bibliography ==
- Mahmud, Dulal (2020). খেলার মাঠে মুক্তিযুদ্ধ (transl. Liberation war in the playground) (in Bengali). Bishhoshahitto Bhobon. ISBN 978-984-8218-31-0.
- Mahmud, Dulal (2014). পাকিস্তান জাতীয় দল বাঙালি খেলোয়াড় (transl. Bengali players in the Pakistan national team) (in Bengali). Bishhoshahitto Bhobon.
- Alam, Masud (2017). ফুটবলের গল্প ফুটবলারদের গল্প (transl. The story of football the story of footballers) (in Bengali). Bishhoshahitto Bhobon. ISBN 9789849134688.
- Mahmud, Noman (2018). ফুটবল পায়ে মুক্তির যুদ্ধ (transl. Liberation war fought by football) (in Bengali). Agamee Prakashani. ISBN 978-984-8218-31-0.
