= Mohammed Mohsin (footballer, born 1963) =

Bangladeshi footballer

Moshin
Personal information
- Full name: Mohammed Mohsin
- Date of birth: 3 April 1963 (age 63)
- Place of birth: Rajshahi, East Pakistan (present-day Bangladesh)
- Positions: Striker; attacking midfielder

Senior career*
Years	Team	Apps	(Gls)
1973–1987	Brothers Union		

International career
1977–1978	Bangladesh U19		
1976–1981	Bangladesh		

Managerial career
- 1984: Brothers Union
- * Club domestic league appearances and goals

Mohammed Mohsin (Bengali: মোহাম্মদ মহসিন; born 3 April 1963) is a former Bangladeshi football player and coach. He spent his entire playing career with Brothers Union and captained the club alongside the Bangladesh national team in 1979. Moshin was a member of the 1980 AFC Asian Cup squad. He is also considered to be one of the best forwards to ever play for Bangladesh and was a lethal marksman in Dhaka football during the mid-1970s and early 1980s.

== Club career ==
Although originally Moshin's inclination was towards athletics, while studying at Pogose School in Gopibagh, his fascination with football began. Seeing Mohsin's ball control and shooting power, Gafur Baloch who was the Brothers Union coach at the time, signed him up for the club while he was still a school student.

In 1973, he got a chance to play in Brothers' Dhaka Third Division team. He repaid the club's faith in him by scoring 39 goals including a hat-trick and a double hat-trick. The next year, he scored 22 goals while playing for the club in the Dhaka Second Division. In 1975, Brothers reached the First Division, and at the time, most of the fans were eyeing Mohammedan-Abahani, but Brothers' Mohsin stood out separately. The club stunned local supporters by defeating the defending champions Abahani in their first league game. At the time Brothers also had future national team players Shahiduddin Ahmed Selim and Hasanuzzaman Bablu.

In 1980, Brothers enjoyed their first major trophy success as they shared the Federation Cup title with Mohammedan SC, and the club would soon begin challenging giants Dhaka Abahani and Mohammedan. The final ended 0-0. This was the first edition of the competition. Later in the season, they defeated the black and whites 3–2 in an exciting league encounter, thanks to their talisman goal-scorer, Mohsin. This was also the only defeat that Mohammedan suffered that year. In 1981, Mohsin became the top scorer in the league with 20 goals including a double hat-trick. The same year when Moshin became leagues top scorer, Brothers, were joint champions of the prestigious Aga Khan Gold Cup along with Thai club Bangkok Bank FC, and not surprisingly, both Abahani and MSC were continuously after him. But he remained loyal to his boyhood team. Regarding not playing in a more popular team, Mohsin said "I am indebted to those at Brothers, it felt like my own club."

On 8 February 1982, A tragic accident at Khulna, during a friendly match in the off-season, meant that Mohsin's football career ended prematurely. According to Moshin, while celebrating Brothers' Aga Khan Gold Cup triumph, he stayed at the club camp all night. The following morning fellow national team forward Abdus Salam Murshedy, advised him to play the Khulna League final for Khulna Muslim Club as a guest player. After arriving in Khulna early morning, Moshin took part in the final between Dada Match Factory and Khulna Muslim Club, now known as Khulna Mohammedan. In the second half, the game was tied at 1-1, and with only a few minutes left in the game, Moshin assisted the winner. While celebrating the audience started bursting crackers, and one of the crackers proceeded to hit Moshin on the shoulder, injuring him. Moshin was sent to Germany for better treatment, however, he did not regain his old form after returning to the field. He announced his retirement on 7 May 1987 prior to Brothers Union's Federation Cup semi-final against Dhaka Wanderers, although he did not play in the match. During his farewell ceremony prior to the game, he handed over his number 10 jersey to Khandoker Wasim Iqbal.

== International career ==
=== Bangladesh U19 ===
Moshin made his debut for Bangladesh U19 during their unsuccessful 1977 AFC Youth Championship campaign, in Iran. The following year, Moshin captained the Bangladesh U19 team, during the 1978 AFC Youth Championship, which took place in Dhaka. While he was not part of the 41 selected players in Asian Youth Football Trials, he was later given a place in the team as captain, by Werner Bickelhaupt. Although the hosts could not advance from the group stages, Moshin's Bangladesh impressed supporters by going head on against much stronger teams. As this was the first international football tournament that took place after the country's independence, it was very highly anticipated by the locals, and the pressurized Bangladesh fell two goal behind during their first game against Singapore. However, goals from Ashish Bhadra and captain Moshin earned the hosts a hard-fought draw. Bangladesh went onto win the next game against North Yemen, although they followed it up by losing to Kuwait. The last game of the group stages saw, Moshin rescue Bangladesh from defeat with his penalty against Bahrain.

#	Date	Venue	Opponent	Score	Result	Competition
1.	7 October 1978	Bangabandhu National Stadium, Dhaka, Bangladesh	Singapore	2–2	2–2	1978 AFC Youth Championship
2.	20 October 1978	Bangabandhu National Stadium, Dhaka, Bangladesh	Bahrain	1–1	1–1	1978 AFC Youth Championship

=== Bangladesh national team ===
Mohsin made his senior international debut during 1976 Bangkok King's Cup, when Bangladesh lost to Malaysia and Thailand "B" team. He was also present with the national team, during the 1978 Bangkok Asian Games, which was the first time Bangladesh took part in the Asian Games. After finding success with the national youth team as the captain, Mohsin was made the captain of the national team before their game against Afghanistan at the 1980 AFC Asian Cup qualifiers, held in Dhaka. Moshin also scored against Qatar in the qualifiers, as Bangladesh surprisingly made it to the main tournament. In 1979, he was with the team for the 9th President's Cup in Seoul, South Korea, in preparations for the upcoming Asian Cup. Moshin later took part in the first President's Gold Cup in Dhaka in 1981. The national team consisting of Selim, Salam Murshedy, Aslam, Kazi Salahuddin, Bhadra, Chunnu & Moshin displayed one of their best performances in country's football history when they lost to much higher ranked North Korea 3–2, during the group stages of the 1980 AFC Asian Cup. However, Moshin's international career was soon cut short due to a horrific injury he suffered in 1981, preventing him from replicating his youth team performances at the senior level.

#	Date	Venue	Opponent	Score	Result	Competition
1.	3 March 1979	Bangabandhu National Stadium, Dhaka, Bangladesh	Qatar	1–0	1–1	1980 AFC Asian Cup qualification

== Coaching career ==
While still playing for the club, Moshin served as the coach of Brothers Union, in 1984. He was also the coach of Wari Club and the Bangladesh Army. He was appointed as the coach of the Bangladesh youth team in a tournament held in Kerala, India in 1992.

In August 2008, Mohsin joined the Bangladesh Football Federation as a paid executive. He was given the job to find venues outside of Dhaka for the then upcoming B.League season.

== Personal life ==
Mohammed Moshin was born into a family from Chapainawabganj District of Rajshahi Division, although he was born in Rajshahi. Mohsin family consists of his wife and two children, Newaz Oni and Menhaj Ovi.

== Honours ==
Brothers Union

- Dhaka Third Division League: 1973
- Dhaka Second Division League: 1974
- Federation Cup: 1980
- Aga Khan Gold Cup: 1981–82

=== Awards and accolades ===
- 1981 − Sports Writers Association's Best Footballer Award.
- 2012 − National Sports Award.

=== Individual ===
- 1973 − Dhaka Third Division League top scorer
- 1974 − Dhaka Second Division League top scorer
- 1981 − Dhaka First Division League top scorer
