= Ali Imam (footballer) =

Bangladeshi footballer and manager

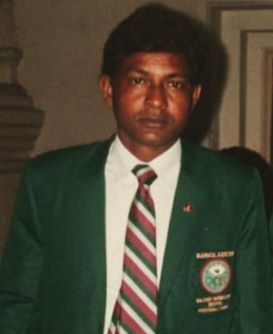
- Imam in 1984

Personal information
- Date of birth: 12 April 1949
- Place of birth: Kushtia, East Bengal, Pakistan (present-day Bangladesh)
- Date of death: 14 March 1989 (aged 39)
- Place of death: Dhaka, Bangladesh
- Position: Winger

Senior career*
Years	Team	Apps	(Gls)
1963–1965	Dhaka Wanderers		
1966	Azad Sporting Club		
1967	Victoria SC		
1968–1971	Dhaka Wanderers		
1972–1975	Abahani Krira Chakra		
1975	East End Club		
1976–1977	Dhaka Wanderers		
1978–1980	Sadharan Bima		

International career
1971	Shadhin Bangla		

Managerial career
- 1980: Sadharan Bima
- 1981–1982: Farashganj SC
- 1983–1984: Abahani Krira Chakra
- 1984: Bangladesh
- 1985: Brothers Union
- 1986: Mohammedan SC
- 1986: Bangladesh
- 1987–1989: The Muslim Institute
- 1988–1989: Rahmatganj MFS
- * Club domestic league appearances and goals

Ali Imam (Bengali: আলী ইমাম; 12 April 1949 – 14 March 1989) was a retired Bangladeshi football player and coach.

== Playing career ==
Ali Imam began his career as a left-winger at Dhaka Wanderers in 1963, under the guidance of his older brother Ali Hafiz. Nonetheless, Imam suffered continuous injuries throughout his career, keeping him out of action for the next two years. He represented Azad Sporting Club during both the 1966 and 1967 editions of the Aga Khan Gold Cup.

During the 1971 Bangladesh Liberation War, Imam had moved to Calcutta and sought shelter in the Mohun Bagan clubhouse with the help of Balai Dey. Imam was one of the main founders of the Shadhin Bangla football team. He also played for the team, touring throughout India to help fund the provisional Bangladesh government by handing over all the prize money they earned from 16 exhibition games played during their tour.

It was Ali Imam’s brain-child. He was trying to gather players but was struggling to form a team. He shared the idea with others, including Protap (Pratap Shankar Hazra) and Ashraf (Sheikh Ashraf Ali) and some other people of different platforms. We had a trial before forming the team.

— Zakaria Pintoo, captain of the Shadhin Bangla football team.

On 13 February 1972, Imam took part in the first football match in newly independent Bangladesh, representing the Bangladesh XI against the President's XI. His team was composed of former members of the Shadhin Bangla football team; nonetheless, they ended up losing 2–0. In 1972, Imam joined Abahani Krira Chakra and contributed to organizing Abahani's first squad. He made his debut during the club's inaugural league game against BJIC on 11 June 1972. He would win his first and only league title in 1974 with the same club.

== Managerial career ==
Imam began training under-18 footballers at Kalabagan field in 1973. The training program saw Imam nurture future national team players such as Ahsanullah Montu, Shafiqul Islam Manik, Arif Abdul Khalek, Shafiul Arefin Tutul, AKM Abdul Baten, Kazi Kamal, AM Abdullah Saik, and Ataur Babu, among others. Imam began coaching in the First Division with Shadharan Bima CSC in 1980 and helped the club finish sixth in the league; however, he made a name for himself as a coach by helping a then newly promoted Farashganj SC avoid relegation from the league in both 1981 and 1982.

In 1983, Imam was given the head coach duty of Abahani Krira Chakra and guided the club to consecutive First Division League titles in 1983 and 1984. His performances as Abahani coach saw him take charge of the Bangladesh national team for the 1984 South Asian Games held in Kathmandu, Nepal. The team finished as runners-up with only two weeks of training, recording 5–0 victories over Maldives and hosts Nepal, before eventually losing 2–4 to Nepal in the final. At the club level, Imam was replaced as Abahani's head coach by the recently retired Kazi Salahuddin, denying him a chance to complete a hat-trick of league triumphs with the club.

In 1985, Imam joined Brothers Union, determined to take revenge. Brothers finished the first part of the season at the top of the table. Mohammedan was 2 points behind, while Abahani was 3 points further adrift. In the league-deciding game, Brothers led Abahani 2–0; however, the Sky Blues produced a memorable comeback to win 3–2. A goalless draw in the final match secured Abahani's third consecutive title as Imam's team finished runners-up. In 1986, Imam joined Mohammedan SC and finally got his revenge on Abahani, edging his former club to the league title. Mohammedan eventually defeated their arch-rivals 2–0 in the title-deciding Dhaka Derby match. In the same year, Imam coached Mohammedan during Nepal's Panchayat Silver Jubilee Cup, where Mohammedan played as the Bangladesh national team.

In 1987, Imam coached The Muslim Institute, based in Old Dhaka, in the Dhaka Second Division Football League. The following year, he returned to coaching in the First Division with Rahmatganj MFS. Imam coached both Old Dhaka clubs until his death in 1989.

== Death ==
Imam, who suffered from heart disease, died on 14 March 1989 after experiencing a heart attack.

== Honours ==
=== Player ===
Abahani Krira Chakra

- Dhaka First Division League: 1974

=== Manager ===
Abahani Krira Chakra

- Dhaka First Division League: 1983, 1984

Mohammedan SC

- Dhaka First Division League: 1986

Bangladesh

- South Asian Games Silver medal: 1984

== See also ==
- List of Bangladesh national football team managers

== Bibliography ==
- Mahmud, Dulal (2020). খেলার মাঠে মুক্তিযুদ্ধ (transl. Liberation war in the playground) (in Bengali). Bishhoshahitto Bhobon. ISBN 978-984-8218-31-0.
- Mahmud, Dulal (2014). পাকিস্তান জাতীয় দল বাঙালি খেলোয়াড় (transl. Bengali players in the Pakistan national team) (in Bengali). Bishhoshahitto Bhobon.
- Alam, Masud (2017). ফুটবলের গল্প ফুটবলারদের গল্প (transl. The story of football the story of footballers) (in Bengali). Bishhoshahitto Bhobon. ISBN 9789849134688.
- Mahmud, Noman (2018). ফুটবল পায়ে মুক্তির যুদ্ধ (transl. Liberation war fought by football) (in Bengali). Agamee Prakashani. ISBN 978-984-8218-31-0.
