= Kang Man-young =

South Korean footballer (born 1962)

Personal information
- Full name: Kang Man-young
- Date of birth: June 14, 1962 (age 64)
- Place of birth: South Korea
- Height: 1.76 m (5 ft 9 in)
- Position: Forward

Senior career*
Years	Team	Apps	(Gls)
1986–1987	Kookmin Bank	?	(?)
1988–1990	Lucky-Goldstar	27	(2)

Managerial career
- ?–1993: Lucky-Goldstar (Scout)
- 1995: Bangladesh
- 1995: Muktijoddha
- 1996: Mohammedan (Caretaker)
- 2004–2005: Mohammedan
- * Club domestic league appearances and goals as of 27 December 2007 ‡ National team caps and goals as of 27 December 2007

Kang Man-young (Korean: 강만영; born June 14, 1962, in South Korea) is a South Korean footballer and manager.

== Club career ==
He played for FC Seoul (then knowns as Lucky-Goldstar FC).

== Managing career ==
He was manager of Bangladesh national football team in 1995. Under his guidance Bangladesh were eliminated from semi-final of the 1995 South Asian Gold Cup, losing to India in penalties. He left after the tournament concluded, and was replaced by German coach Otto Pfister.

In 1996, during his stay in Bangladesh, Kang was put incharge of Mohammedan Sporting Club as caretaker manager. He guided the club to the 1996 Dhaka Premier Division League trophy as undefeated champions.

He was re-appointed as Mohammedan Sporting Club manager in December 2004.

== Honours ==
Mohammedan SC

- Dhaka Premier Division League: 1996

Lucky-Goldstar FC

- Korean National Football Championship: 1988

== See also ==
- List of Bangladesh national football team managers
