= Javier Cabrera (football manager) =

Spanish football manager (born 1984)

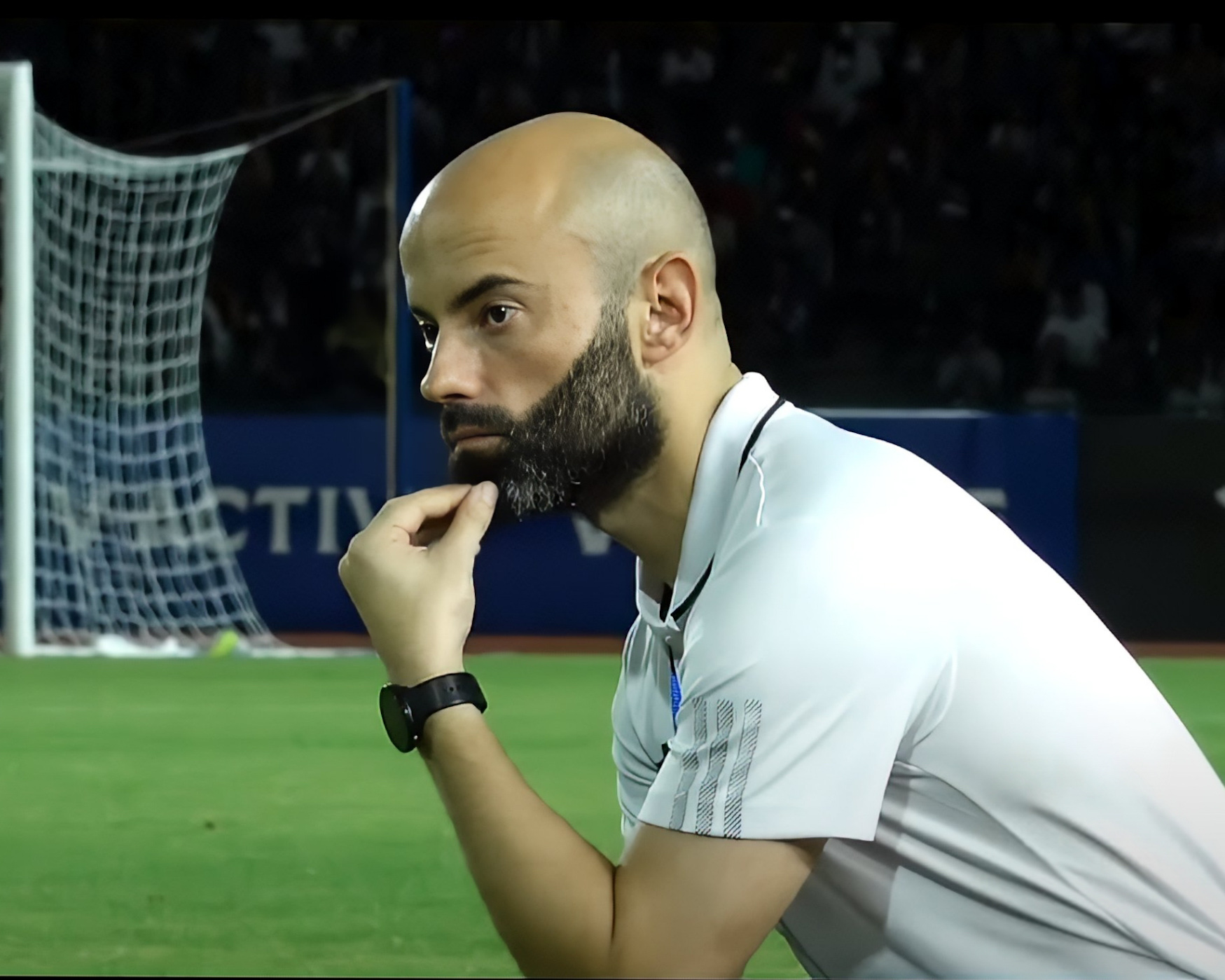
- Cabrera as Bangladesh manager in 2023

Personal information
- Full name: Javier Fernández Cabrera Martín Peñato
- Date of birth: 4 October 1984 (age 42)
- Place of birth: Madrid, Spain
- Height: 1.84 m (6 ft 0 in)

Managerial career
- Years: Team
- 2013–2015: Sporting Goa (assistant)
- 2016–2017: Rayo Majadahonda
- 2018-2020: Barcelona Academy USA
- 2020–2022: Deportivo Alavés U19
- 2022–2026: Bangladesh
- 2022–2026: Bangladesh U23

Javier Fernández Cabrera Martín Peñato (born 4 October 1984) is a Spanish professional football manager who last coached the Bangladesh national football team.

Cabrera is a UEFA Pro License coach with a wide range of experience in both professional and grassroots football projects. He also has a reputation as a football analyst and has experience of working as an expert analyst for Opta Sports.

Cabrera has a bachelor's degree in football as well as advertising and marketing.

== Coaching career ==
Cabrera worked as a technical director and as an assistant coach for Indian side Sporting Clube de Goa, from 2013 to 2015. In 2016, he was appointed as the manager for Spanish club Rayo Majadahonda and spent a year coaching the team, before departing in 2017. Moreover, he was the head coach of Barcelona Academy in North Carolina for 4 months in 2018. From 2018, Cabrera acted as the Elite Academy coach of La Liga side Deportivo Alavés for 4 years.

=== Bangladesh national team ===
On 8 January 2022, Bangladesh Football Federation (BFF) announced the appointment of Javier Fernández Cabrera as the new national team head coach. Cabrera signed an 11 month contract during a meeting called by the BFF on 19 January 2022, where he was officially made the head coach of the Bangladesh national team.

Cabrera's first game incharge ended in a 0–2 defeat in a friendly, at the hand of Maldives, on 24 March 2022. In June, Cabrera guided the team to three straight defeats, as Bangladesh finished bottom of their group in the 2023 AFC Asian Cup qualification – third round. The team conceded 8 and scored 2 goals over their qualification campaign.

On 22 September 2022, Cabrera gained his first victory as Bangladesh coach, which came in his seventh match incharge, when Rakib Hossain scored the only goal as Bangladesh edged Cambodia 1–0. However, the following friendly saw the team go down 1–3 to hosts Nepal.

On 11 January 2023, BFF extended Cabrera's contract for one more year. The new deal meant the Spaniard would remain at the helm until December 2023. In December 2023, BFF renewed its contract with Javier Cabrera, extending his tenure for another year until December 2024.

On 17 January 2025, the BFF further extended Cabrera's contract until 30 April 2026, making him the longest-serving coach in Bangladesh's history.

=== Bangladesh U23 ===
Cabrera was given the duty as head coach of the Bangladesh national under-23 team for the 2022 Asian Games in Hangzhou, China.

== Managerial statistics ==
As of 25 May 2026

Team	From	To	Record							
Team	From	To	G	W	D	L	GF	GA	32GD	Win %
Bangladesh	8 January 2022	30 April 2026	39	10	10	19	30	58	−28	25.64
Bangladesh U23	19 September 2023	30 April 2026	3	0	1	2	0	2	−2	0.00

== See also ==
- List of Bangladesh national football team managers
