= Wazed Gazi =

Bangladeshi footballer (1931–2018)

- Gazi post-retirement

Personal information
- Full name: Wazed Ali Gazi
- Date of birth: 1931
- Place of birth: Barasat, Bengal, British India (present-day India)
- Date of death: 13 September 2018 (aged 87)
- Place of death: Jessore, Bangladesh
- Position: Left winger

Youth career
- 1955–1956: Kolkata Victoria

Senior career*
Years	Team	Apps	(Gls)
1957–1961	Sporting Union		
1962–1963	Kolkata Mohammedan		
1964–1965	EPG Press SRC		
1966	Dhaka Wanderers		
1967–1973	BIDC		
1974–1975	Dhaka Mohammedan		
1976–1977	Dhaka Wanderers		

International career
1970	East Pakistan		

Managerial career
- 1978–1983: Rahmatganj MFS
- 1984–1985: Arambagh KS
- 1986–1988: Muktijoddha Sangsad
- 1987: Bangladesh
- 1989: Farashganj SC
- 1990: Arambagh KS
- 1993: BRTC SC
- 1993: Bangladesh Ansar
- 1993–1994: Shantinagar Club
- 1996–2002: Arambagh KS
- 2003–2004: Sheikh Russel KC
- 2005–2006: Brothers Union
- 2007–2009: Sheikh Russel KC
- 2010: Arambagh KS
- 2011–2013: Team BJMC (technical advisor)
- * Club domestic league appearances and goals

Wazed Gazi (Bengali: ওয়াজেদ গাজী; 1931 – 13 September 2018) was a Bangladeshi football player and coach.

== Early life ==
Wazed Gazi was born in 1931 in Barasat, British India. His ancestral home is in the Dhalbaria Union of Satkhira District. Gazi's father, Soleman Gazi, worked for the Calcutta-based Jessop & Company, and thus, Gazi spent his childhood in Calcutta. Eventually, Gazi began working for the West Bengal State Electricity Board on a monthly salary and also represented them in the West Bengal Office Football League. In 1955, he began participating in the Third Division of the Calcutta Football League with Victoria Club.

== Playing career ==
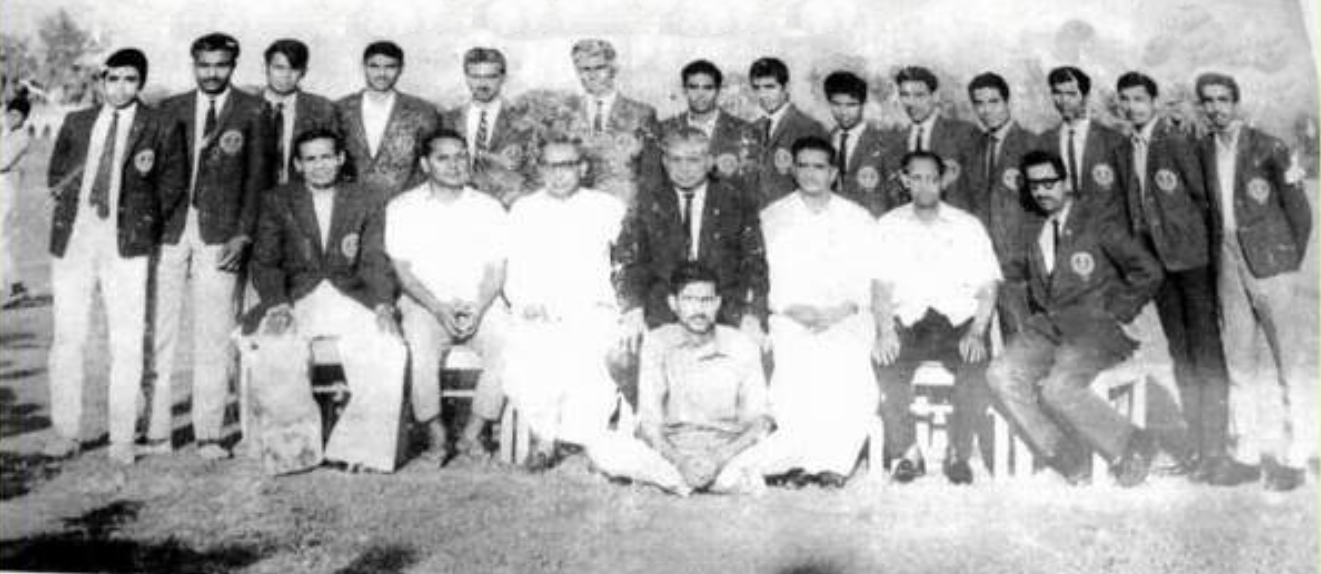
Gazi (standing first from right) with the Jessore District team in 1968.

In 1957, Ali joined Sporting Union in the First Division of the Calcutta League on the recommendation of local trainer, Ramani Sarkar. He spent four years at the club, before joining Kolkata Mohammedan in 1962.

In 1963, he moved to Jessore, East Pakistan (now Bangladesh), after securing a job in the East Pakistan Government Press. He also began representing its football team in the Dhaka First Division League from 1964.

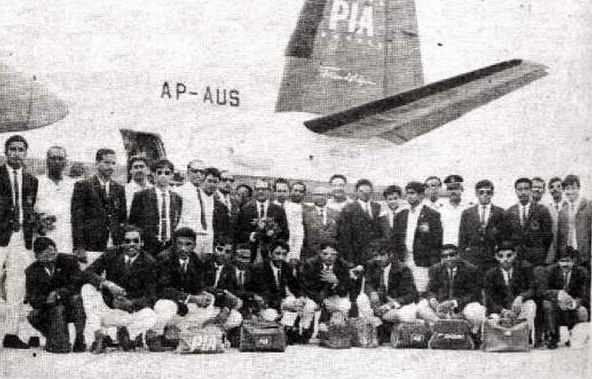
Gazi (standing second from right) with the Nepal-bound East Pakistan football team in 1970.

Gazi won the First Division League title on five different occasions, four times with Team BJMC (EPIDC/BIDC) and once with Dhaka Mohammedan. He notably scored for Mohammedan during their title-deciding Dhaka Derby encounter with Abahani Krira Chakra in 1975 during a 4–0 victory.

He was a member of the East Pakistan football team that won the King Mahendra Cup in Nepal in 1970. Gazi represented the President's XI team against Bangladesh XI, in the first football match held in independent Bangladesh, on 13 February 1972. His team won the game held at the Dhaka Stadium 2–0.

Gazi also represented the Jessore District football team and was part of the team that triumphed in the Sher-e-Bangla Cup in 1976. Gazi notably led the Jessore Zonal team against the touring Dinamo Minsk in 1973. He also played against the Soviet club while representing Dhaka XI.

== Coaching career ==
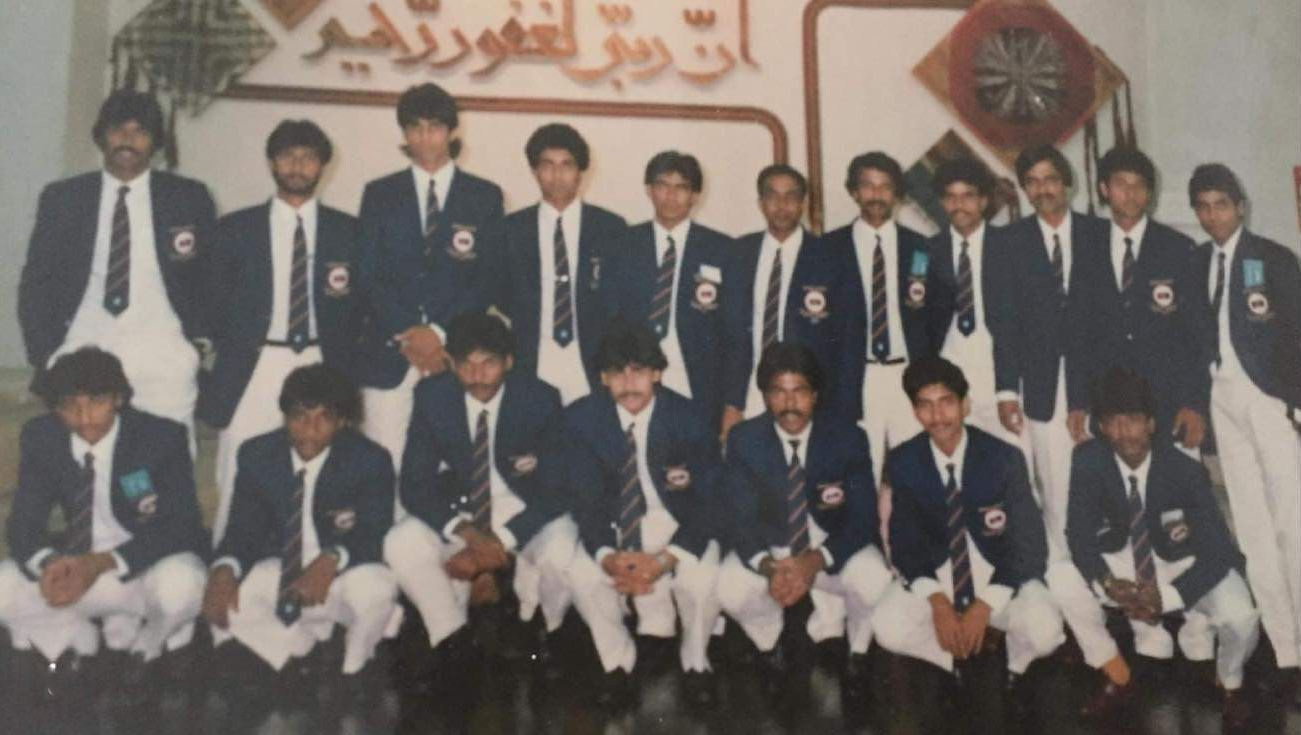
Gazi (standing sixth from right) with the Bangladesh national team in 1987.

In 1978, Gazi began his coaching career with Rahmatganj MFS in the Dhaka First Division League. He spent five years at the club, nurturing future internationals such as Kaiser Hamid, Imtiaz Sultan Johnny and Ashish Bhadra. In 1981, he acted as the assistant coach of Arambagh KS only during Nepal's ANFA Cup and helped them finish runners-up. Gazi joined Arambagh permanently as coach in 1984. He had numerous coaching stints at the club, the longest lasting from 1996 to 2002.

In 1987, Gazi was appointed Bangladesh national football team head coach for Pakistan's Quaid-e-Azam International Tournament. The team finished fourth place in the eight team tournament. He also worked in the lower divisions, guiding Shantinagar Club to promotion to the Dhaka First Division Football League (second–tier) as the champions of the Second Division in 1994. Gazi led newly promoted Sheikh Russel KC to a runners-up finish in the 2003–04 Premier Division League.

In 2005, he won the domestic double with Brothers Union, clinching both the Premier Division League and Federation Cup titles. He also led the club during both the 2005 and 2006 editions of the AFC Cup.

In 2007, Gazi returned to Sheikh Russel KC as coach for the inaugural professional league season. He spent two seasons at the club, guiding them to a fourth and third-place finish, respectively. Gazi retired from coaching after guiding Arambagh to a fifth-place finish in the 2009–10 Bangladesh League.

In 2011, Gazi was appointed technical advisor to Team BJMC. However, he left the role after falling ill during the club's 2013 King's Cup tour in Bhutan.

== Death ==
On 31 January 2012, Gazi was put on life support at Labaid Hospital in Dhaka. Although he soon recovered, he was forced to distance himself from football and left his role as the technical advisor of Team BJMC the following year.

On 13 September 2018, Gazi died at his residence in Jessore, Bangladesh.

== Honours ==
=== Player ===
Team BJMC

- Dhaka First Division League: 1967, 1968, 1970, 1973
- All-Pakistan Ismail Gold Shield: 1967, 1968, 1969
- Independence Day Cup: 1967

Dhaka Mohammedan

- Dhaka First Division League: 1975

Jessore District

- Sher-e-Bangla Cup: 1976

East Pakistan

- King Mahendra Cup: 1970

=== Coach ===
Shantinagar Club

- Dhaka Second Division League: 1993–94

Brothers Union

- Dhaka Premier Division League: 2005
- Federation Cup: 2005

Individual

- Sports Writers Association's Best Coach Award: 1989

== See also ==
- List of Bangladesh national football team managers

== Bibliography ==
- Dulal, Mahmud (2020). খেলার মাঠে মুক্তিযুদ্ধ (transl. Liberation war in the playground) (in Bengali). Bishhoshahitto Bhobon. ISBN 978-984-8218-31-0.
- Alam, Masud (2017). ফুটবলের গল্প ফুটবলারদের গল্প (transl. The story of football the story of footballers) (in Bengali). Bishhoshahitto Bhobon. ISBN 9789849134688.
