= Oldřich Šváb =

Czech-Swiss football coach (1944–2020)

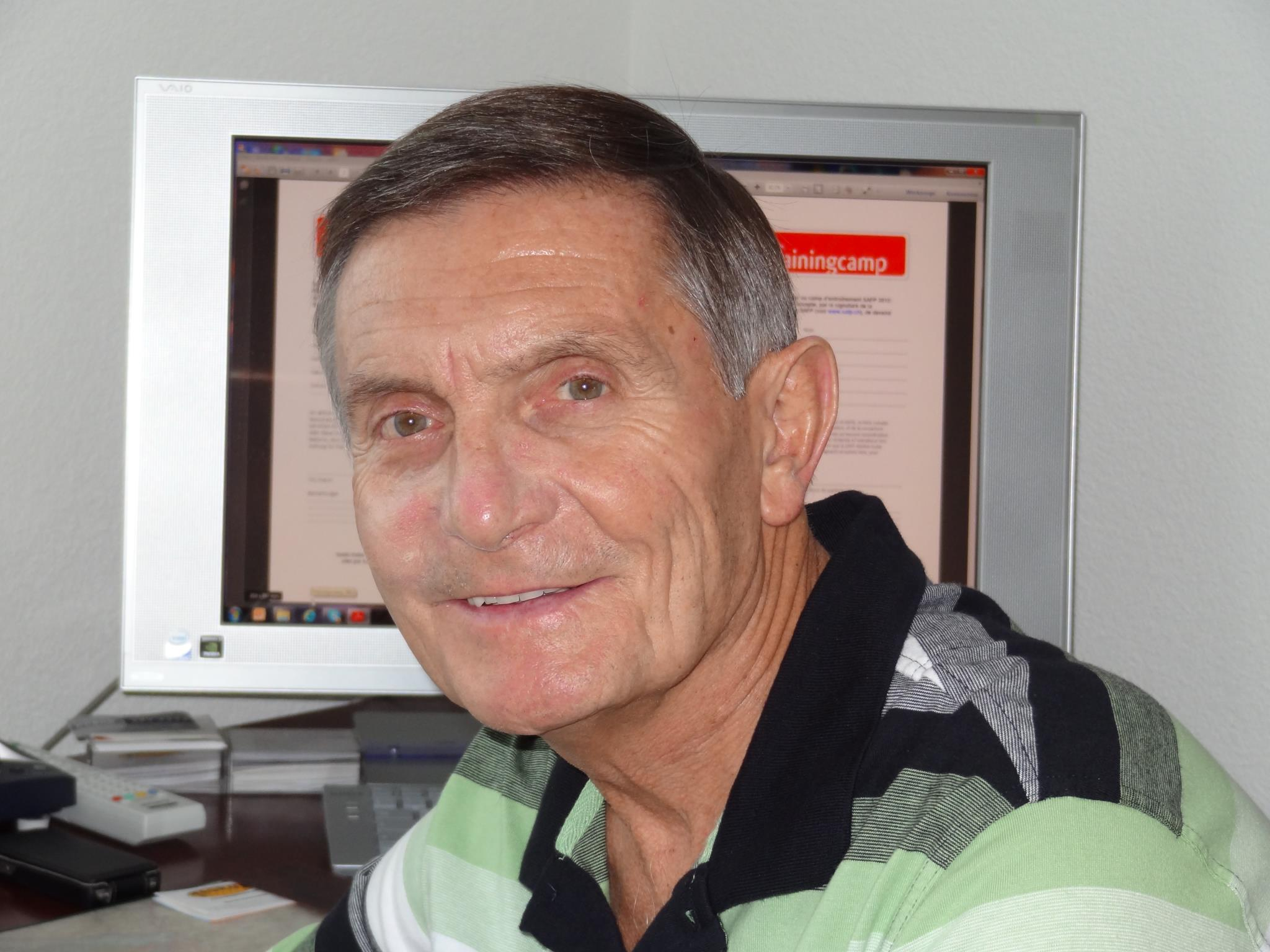

Personal information
- Date of birth: 2 November 1944
- Place of birth: Roudnice nad Labem, Protectorate of Bohemia and Moravia
- Date of death: 23 December 2020 (aged 76)
- Place of death: Aadorf, Switzerland

Managerial career
- Years: Team
- 1993: Bangladesh

Oldřich Šváb (German: Oldrich Swab; 2 November 1944 – 23 December 2020) was a Czech-Swiss football coach and player. He managed the Bangladesh national football team in 1993.

== Life ==
He was born in Roudnice nad Labem during the Nazi Germany occupation of Czechoslovakia. He played football in FK Teplice. In 1969, he visited his brother in Switzerland and has since stayed in this country. He died in his house in Aadorf on 23 December 2020.

== Career ==
=== Bangladesh ===
Asked to work with the Bangladesh national team in 1993 by Juan Antonio Samaranch, then president of the International Olympic Committee, Šváb took the Bengal Tigers to the 1993 South Asian Games, not making it past the group stage and finishing sixth in the six-team cup. Following the tournament, a story published in a local newspaper stated that while Swab was in Farmgate, a man came to him, glimpsed the gold chain in his shirt, and exclaimed "This is your gold, where is our gold?" It is unknown whether the news piece was true or an erroneous report.

During his stint as Bangladesh coach, Šváb was known for giving his players honey and dropping players in good form for unknown purposes.

== See also ==
- List of Bangladesh national football team managers
