= Pran Govinda Kundu =

Bangladeshi footballer and coach (born 1950)

Personal information
- Full name: Pran Govinda Kundu
- Date of birth: 21 October 1950 (age 76)
- Place of birth: Munshiganj, East Bengal, Pakistan (present-day Bangladesh)
- Positions: Center-back; striker

Senior career*
Years	Team	Apps	(Gls)
1967–1968	Eastern SC		
1969	Kamal SC		
1970	Fire Service AC		
1972	Victoria SC		
1973–1981	Team BJMC		
1982	Muktijoddha Sangsad		

International career
1971	Shadhin Bangla		

Managerial career
- 1984–1989: Adamjee SSC
- 1985: Victoria SC
- 1985: Bangladesh (assistant)
- 1989: Bangladesh
- 1991: Muktijoddha Sangsad
- 1991: Bangladesh (assistant)
- 1992: Farashganj SC
- 1996–1999: Farashganj SC
- 2000–2002: Rahmatganj MFS
- 2005: BRTC SC
- * Club domestic league appearances and goals

Pran Govinda Kundu (Bengali: প্রাণ গোবিন্দ কুন্ডু; born 21 October 1950), is a former Bangladeshi football player and manager. He was well known by his nickname Lucky Govinda during his playing days. He was a member of the Shadhin Bangla football team during the Bangladesh Liberation War and later was head coach of the Bangladesh national team.

== Career ==
Govinda's football journey began in 1967 with Eastern Sporting Club in the Dhaka Third Division League. He moved through the leagues, playing for Kamal Sporting Club and Fire Service. His career paused during the Bangladesh Liberation War, leading him to join Ali Imam's Shadhin Bangla football team in Calcutta.

Returning post-war, he won two First Division titles with Team BJMC, in 1973 and 1979. Govinda retired as captain of Second Division club, Muktijoddha Sangsad KC in 1982.

As a coach, Govinda won both the third division and second division titles with Adamjee SSC. He even guided the club to a fifth-place finish in the 1985 Dhaka League. He assumed the role of the head coach for the Bangladesh national team in all six games during the 1990 FIFA World Cup qualification – AFC first round.

He migrated to India after retiring as a coach in 2005. In 2023, Govinda revealed that his name had been misspelled in the official government gazette for the Shadhin Bangla football team.

== Honours ==
=== Player ===
Team BJMC

- Dhaka First Division League: 1973, 1979

=== Manager ===
Adamjee SSC

- Dhaka Third Division League: 1984
- Dhaka Second Division League: 1986

== See also ==
- List of Bangladesh national football team managers

== Bibliography ==
- Dulal, Mahmud (2020). খেলার মাঠে মুক্তিযুদ্ধ (transl. Liberation war in the playground) (in Bengali). Bishhoshahitto Bhobon. ISBN 978-984-8218-31-0.
- Alam, Masud (2017). ফুটবলের গল্প ফুটবলারদের গল্প (transl. The story of football the story of footballers) (in Bengali). Bishhoshahitto Bhobon. ISBN 9789849134688.
- Mahmud, Noman (2018). ফুটবল পায়ে মুক্তির যুদ্ধ (transl. Liberation war fought by football) (in Bengali). Agamee Prakashani. ISBN 978-984-8218-31-0.
