= György Kottán =

Hungarian-Austrian footballer (1946–2023)

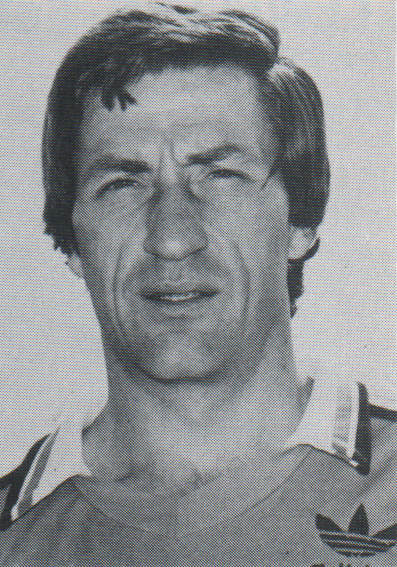
- Kottán in 1979

Personal information
- Date of birth: 6 October 1946
- Place of birth: Budapest, Hungary
- Date of death: 25 September 2023 (aged 76)
- Place of death: Budapest, Hungary
- Position: Midfielder

Senior career*
Years	Team	Apps	(Gls)
1962–1972	MTK	13	(1)
1973–1975	VÖEST Linz	80	(18)
1975–1976	Bayer Uerdingen	10	(0)
1977–1978	Union Wels		
1979	Los Angeles Aztecs	8	(1)
1981	SC Eisenstadt		

Managerial career
- 1979: Los Angeles Aztecs (assistant)
- 1980–1983: 1. FC Köln (assistant)
- 1987–1988: Murcia (assistant)
- 1990: Levante (assistant)
- 2000–2003: Bangladesh
- 2003–2005: Muktijoddha Sangsad
- 2005–2006: Churchill Brothers
- 2009–2010: Pakistan
- 2010: Pakistan U23
- 2015–2016: Dhaka Abahani
Medal record
Men's football
Representing Bangladesh (as manager)
SAFF Championship
Winner	2003 Bangladesh
- * Club domestic league appearances and goals

György Kottán (6 October 1946 – 25 September 2023), also referred to as a Georg Kottán or George Kottán, was a Hungarian-Austrian football manager and player. He guided the Bangladesh national team to their only SAFF Championship in 2003. Additionally, he holds the record for being the only coach to win the Bangladesh Premier League as an undefeated champion, with Abahani Limited Dhaka in 2015–16.

== Playing career ==
Kottán played as a midfielder and started his career at MTK. His first match in the first league was on 5 April 1970. He left in 1972 to play in the Austrian National League for SK VÖEST Linz where they won the title in 1974, becoming the first team from Linz to become Austrian champions.

Kottán then transferred to KFC Uerdingen 05 of the Bundesliga in 1976 before winding up his playing career in 1979 in the US for the Los Angeles Aztecs in the North American Soccer League, playing for them for one season as a player-coach under Rinus Michels.

== Managerial career ==
The following season Kottan became Rinus Michels assistant at the Aztecs. After a break, he rejoined Michels at German club 1. FC Köln where they won the DFB-Pokal. In 1984 Kottan left to take charge of his first club in Austria, with Ch. Linz and stayed until 1987 when he left to become a coach under Antal Dunai first for Real Murcia and then moved with him in 1990 to Levante UD.

Then in 1993, he worked with Dunai for the Hungarian Olympic football team, reaching the 1996 Olympic games. Kottan remained as a technical director until 2000 when he had the opportunity to manage Bangladesh, taking them to victory in the 2003 South Asian Football Federation Gold Cup.

Kottán also managed Muktijoddha Sangsad of the Bangladesh Premier League and in the process won the Bangladesh Federation Cup. Later, Kottan took control of Indian National Football League club Churchill Brothers in 2005.

Kottán became the Pakistan national team head coach on 20 February 2009. However, just one year later his contract wasn't renewed after mixed results. He also served as head coach of Pakistan under-23 team for the 2010 South Asian Games. Then he joined Abahani Limited Dhaka, in 2015. In 2016, Kottán led Abahani to the 2015–16 Bangladesh Premier League trophy as unbeaten champions.

== Other work ==
Kottan also worked on FIFA's Goal Project in Berlin, Germany and had a degree from the German Sport University Cologne. He also held a UEFA Pro Licence.

== Death ==
György Kottán died in Budapest on 25 September 2023, at the age of 76.

== Honours ==
=== Player ===
SK VOEST Linz

- Austrian Bundesliga: 1973–74

=== Manager ===
Bangladesh

- SAFF Gold Cup: 2003

Muktijoddha Sangsad KS

- Federation Cup: 2003

Abahani Limited Dhaka

- Bangladesh Premier League: 2015–16
- Federation Cup: 2016

== See also ==
- List of Bangladesh national football team managers
