= Shahid Uddin Ahmed Selim =

Bangladeshi footballer (1953–2022)

Shahid Uddin Selim

Personal information
- Full name: Shahid Uddin Ahmed Selim
- Date of birth: 23 July 1953
- Place of birth: Feni, East Bengal, Pakistan (present-day Bangladesh)
- Date of death: 5 January 2022 (aged 68)
- Place of death: Dhaka, Bangladesh
- Position: Centre-back

Senior career*
Years	Team	Apps	(Gls)
1968–1983	Brothers Union		

International career
1977	Bangladesh U19		
1975–1980	Bangladesh		

Managerial career
- 1987: Bangladesh Boys
- 1988–1990: Fakirerpool YMC
- 1991–2000: Brothers Union
- 1991: Bangladesh
- * Club domestic league appearances and goals

Shahid Uddin Ahmed Selim (Bengali: শহীদ উদ্দিন আহমেদ সেলিম; 23 July 1953 – 5 January 2022) was a Bangladeshi football coach and former player. He spent his entire club career with Brothers Union and had both played for and coached the Bangladesh national team. Selim captained Bangladesh during the 1980 AFC Asian Cup, which was the first and only time the country has qualified for the AFC Asian Cup to date.

== Club career ==
During the Liberation war in 1971, Brothers Union shut down its club activities. After the war, Selim started reorganizing the players and also attained the services of Pakistani coach Abdul Gafur Baloch. In the early years of the club's rebirth, the players trained in a four-storey building in 48 Ramakrishna Mission Road, Gopibagh, owned by Selim's older brother, Saifuddin Ahmed Manik. Initially joining the club in 1968, Selim spent more than ten years captaining the Oranges during which Brothers became the third most well supported club in the country behind Abahani Krira Chakra and Mohammedan SC. In 1973, Brothers won the Third Division League, and in 1974, Selim captained Brothers to another promotion by winning the Second Division League. In 1975, Brothers Union took part in the country's top tier, the First Division, for the first time and caused a major upset by defeating the defending champions, Abahani Krira Chakra, during their first league match. Selim remained club captain until 1978. In 1980, Selim was part of the team which won the Federation Cup alongside Mohammedan SC. The following season, he won the Aga Khan Gold Cup with Brothers, alongside Thai club Bangkok Bank FC.

== International career ==
Selim made his international debut for Bangladesh in the 1975 Merdeka Tournament held in Malaysia. The national coach at the time, Abdur Rahim, included Selim in the team as a backup center-back following the retirement of Zakaria Pintoo. He later captained the Bangladesh U19 team during the 1977 AFC Youth Championship.

In 1978, several players quit the national team following a captaincy dispute involving Mohammedan's Shahidur Rahman Shantoo and Abahani's Nannu. In response, the federation decided to refrain from selecting captains from the two Dhaka teams. Consequently, Selim was named the national team captain in 1980. He captained Bangladesh during the 1980 AFC Asian Cup in Kuwait.

== Managerial career ==
After retirement from football as a player, Selim started coaching in the lower divisions and regularly trained City Club. In 1987, he led Bangladesh Boys Club to the Dhaka Third Division League title. In 1988, he made his First Division debut as a coach with the newly promoted Fakirerpool Young Men's Club. In his first season, Fakirerpool finished sixth in the league and reached the Super League round. On 16 March 1990, Selim lead Fakirerpool to a 2–1 victory over Mohammedan SC, which ended their record of being unbeaten in the league for one thousand six hundred and fifty days. Selim got his coaching license in 1990 from Bangalore, India.

In 1991, Selim was appointed as head coach of his former club Brothers Union. In the Federation Cup final that year, Brothers defeated Mohammedan on penalties to win their first solo major title. The title triumph earned him a chance to coach the Bangladesh national team at the 1991 South Asian Games. Selim guided Bangladesh to a third-place finish, by defeating Nepal 2–0. During the same tournament, Selim became the first national team coach to defeat South Asian giants India, thanks to a brace from striker Rizvi Karim Rumi. From 1994 to 2009, he was the Joint Secretary of Brothers Union and served as head coach until 2000. Selim was the Vice President of the Gopibagh-based club from 2010 until his death in 2022.

== Personal life and death ==
Bangladeshi communist politician, the late Saifuddin Ahmed Manik, was Selim's older brother and one of the founding members of Brothers Union.

Selim died from oral cancer on 5 January 2022, at the age of 68.

== Honours ==
=== Player ===
Brothers Union

- Dhaka Third Division League: 1973
- Dhaka Second Division League: 1974
- Federation Cup: 1980
- Aga Khan Gold Cup: 1981–82

=== Manager ===
Bangladesh Boys

- Dhaka Third Division League: 1987

Brothers Union

- Federation Cup: 1991

Bangladesh

- South Asian Games Bronze medal: 1991
