= Saifuddin Ahmed Manik =

Bangladeshi politician

Saifuddin Ahmed Manik was a Bangladeshi communist politician.

== Early life ==
Manik was born on 24 June 1939 in Jalpaiguri, West Bengal, British India. After the Partition of India in 1947, his family moved to Gopibagh, Dhaka. He studied and graduated from Muslim Government High School and Dhaka College. He graduated from Dhaka University with a masters in political science. He was a founder of Brothers Union and Chhayanaut. While studying in Dhaka University, he was the general secretary of Sangskriti Sangsad. He was involved with student politics and protested against President Ayub Khan and government's Education Commission Report. In 1965, he served as the general secretary of East Pakistan Students Union.

== Career ==
Manik was the president of the East Pakistan Students Union. He was one of the architects of Eleven Points Programme. He was a key leader of Sarbadaliya Chhatra Sangram Parishad which spearheaded the 1969 Mass uprising in East Pakistan. Following the mass uprising, President Ayub Khan resigned and Manik decided to focus on trade union activities. He was elected president of the labor union at Latif Bawany Jute Mills. He created a pan-national trade union called Bangladesh Trade Union Centre (TUC). He was elected the first general secretary of Bangladesh Trade Union Centre (TUC).

Manik had fought in the Bangladesh Liberation war in a unit composed of left wing students. After the independence of Bangladesh, he joined the Communist Party of Bangladesh and was elected to the Central Secretariat of the party. In 1993, the Communist Party of Bangladesh divided into different parties and he helped organize a new party, Gano Forum. In 1996, he became the general secretary of Gano Forum, a position he held till his death.

== Personal life and death ==
Manik's younger brother Shahid Uddin Ahmed Selim was a professional footballer, who captained both Brothers Union and the Bangladesh national football team. Selim died from oral cancer on 5 January 2022, at the age of 68.

Manik died on 3 February 2008 in Comfort Hospital, Dhaka, Bangladesh from lung cancer.

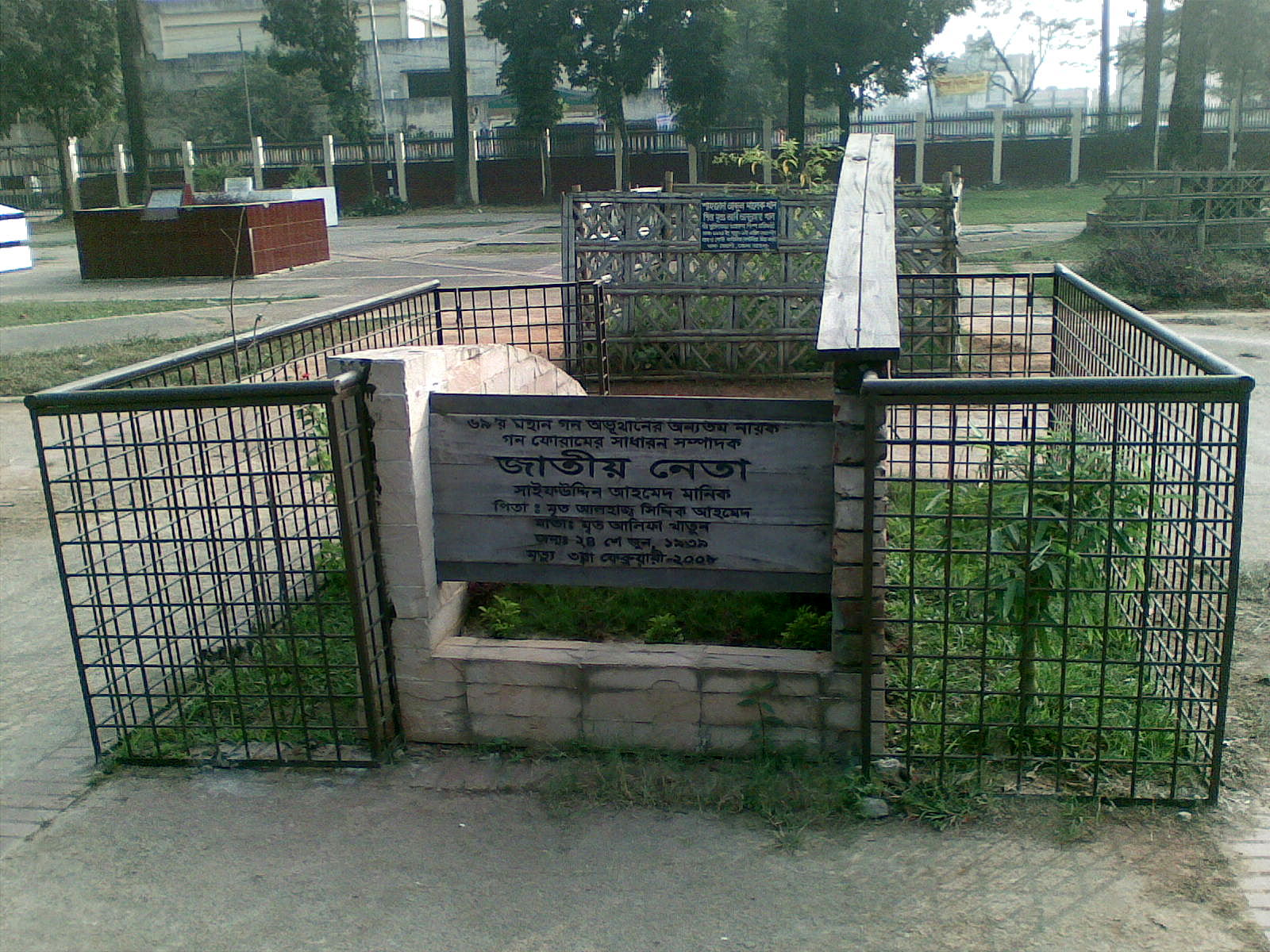
The grave of Saifuddin Ahmed Manik
