= Lodewijk de Kruif =

Dutch footballer and coach

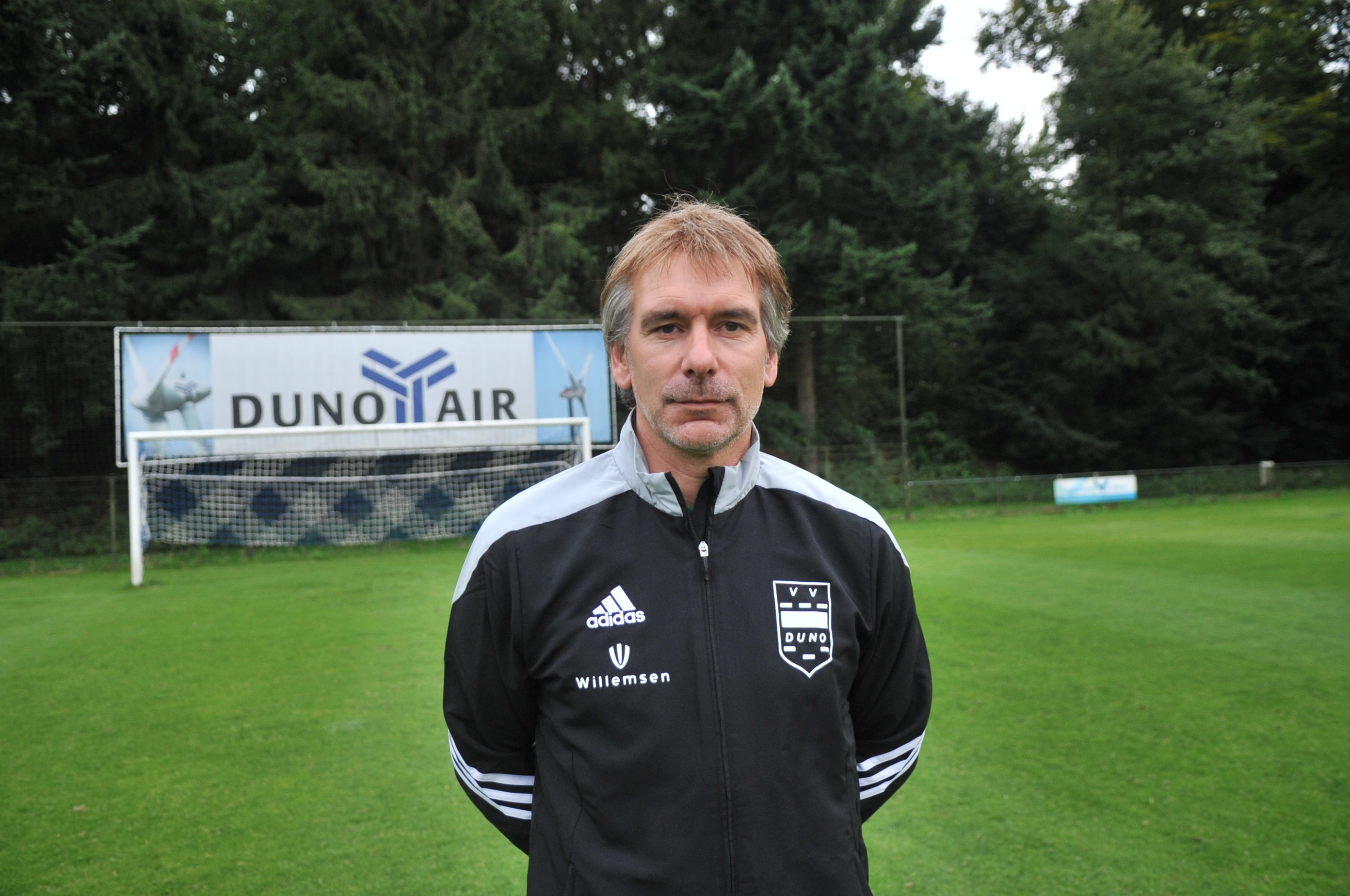

Personal information
- Date of birth: 7 October 1969 (age 57)
- Place of birth: Lunteren, Netherlands
- Position: Defender

Team information
- Current team: VV DUNO (manager)

Senior career*
Years	Team	Apps	(Gls)
1993–1994	TOP Oss	19	(1)

Managerial career
- 2013–2014: Bangladesh
- 2015–2016: VV DUNO
- 2015: Bangladesh
- * Club domestic league appearances and goals

Lodewijk de Kruif (born 7 October 1969) is a Dutch football coach and former professional player who manages VV DUNO.

== Playing career ==
De Kruif made 19 league appearances for TOP Oss in the 1993-94 season.

== Coaching career ==
After Samson Siasia left Nigerian club Heartland to manage the Nigerian national team, De Kruif was one of four European coaches named in December 2010 on the shortlist to replace him. He worked for the club as a Technical Advisor, leaving his role in May 2012 to return to the Netherlands for personal reasons. In January 2013, De Kruif was appointed manager of the Bangladesh national football team. He left the role in October 2014, although he was re-appointed briefly in January 2015 for the Bangabandhu Gold Cup. Earlier that month he had been appointed manager of amateur club VV DUNO.
