= Werner Bickelhaupt =

German professional football coach

Personal information
- Date of birth: 2 December 1939 (age 86)
- Place of birth: Ober-Ramstadt, Germany

Managerial career
- Years: Team
- 1971–1972: SpVgg Greuther Fürth
- 1972–1973: Freiburger FC
- 1973: VfR Aalen
- 1974–1975: Spvgg Freudenstadt
- 1976–1977: Würzburger FV
- 1977–1978: SC Young Fellows Juventus
- 1978–1979: Bangladesh
- 1979: Thailand
- 1980: FV Biberach
- Al Ittihad
- 1986: Sakaryaspor
- 2003: Swaziland

Werner Bickelhaupt (born 2 December 1939) is a German professional football coach who has managed at both national and international level in Europe, Asia and Africa.

== Career ==
Born in Ober-Ramstadt, Bickelhaupt has managed SpVgg Greuther Fürth, Freiburger FC, Spvgg Freudenstadt, Würzburger FV, SC Young Fellows Juventus, Thailand, FV Biberach and Al Ittihad.

In 1978 he became the first foreign coach of Bangladesh. He also managed the Bangladesh U19 team at the 1978 AFC Youth Championship, held in Dhaka, Bangladesh. In 1988, he once again took charge of the Bangladesh U19 team, managing the team during their failed attempt to qualify for 1988 AFC Youth Championship.

In October 2003 he became the new head coach of the Swaziland national football team. In December 2003 Bickelhaupt was sacked as manager after Swaziland lost to the Cape Verde Islands in the preliminaries of the 2006 World Cup qualifiers.

== See also ==
- List of Bangladesh national football team managers
