= Zakaria Pintoo =

Bangladeshi footballer (1943–2024)

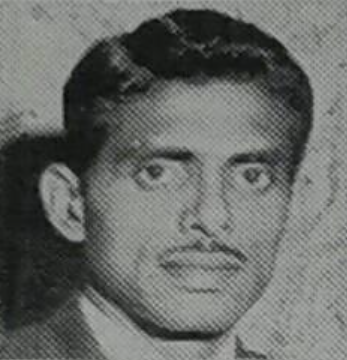
- Pintoo in 1969

Personal information
- Full name: Mohammad Zakaria Pintoo
- Date of birth: 1 January 1943
- Place of birth: Naogaon District, Bengal Province, British India
- Date of death: 18 November 2024 (aged 81)
- Place of death: Dhaka, Bangladesh
- Height: 1.75 m (5 ft 9 in)
- Position: Centre back

Senior career*
Years	Team	Apps	(Gls)
1957–1958	East End		
1959–1961	Dhaka Wanderers		
1961–1975	Mohammedan		

International career
1963–1970	East Pakistan		
1969–1970	Pakistan		
1971	Shadhin Bangla		
1973	Bangladesh		

Managerial career
- 1977: Mohammedan
- 1979: Bangladesh
- * Club domestic league appearances and goals

Zakaria Pintoo (Bengali: জাকারিয়া পিন্টু; 1 January 1943 – 18 November 2024), alternatively spelled Zakaria Pintu, was a Bangladeshi footballer who played as a defender. He was the first captain of the Bangladesh national team.

Pintoo gained fame as the captain of the Shadhin Bangla football team during the Bangladesh Liberation War. Before the country's independence, Pintoo represented both the Pakistan national football team and the East Pakistan football team, captaining the latter on numerous occasions. In club football, Pintoo represented Mohammedan SC, one of the most popular clubs in Bangladesh, for a continuous period of 14 years.

In recognition of his contribution to the country's football, the Government of Bangladesh honored him with the Independence Award in 1995, and the National Sports Awards in 1978.

== Early life ==
Born on 1 January 1943 in Naogaon District, British India, Pintoo spent most of his childhood in Barisal District. In 1958, he was admitted to Jagannath College after completing his secondary examinations at Mathbaria High School. He captained the college football team into winning the Sir AF Rahman Shield and Governors Cup. In 1960, after finishing his higher secondary examinations, Pintoo joined Barisal BM College, and won the Sher-e-Bangla Cup as team captain. In 1968, Pintoo gained admission to Dhaka University, and captained their football team as they would become champions of the East Pakistan Combined University Football Championship. In 1969, Pintoo captained East Pakistan Combined University to the zonal championship of the National Football Championship.

== Club career ==
=== East End Club ===
In 1957, a year before his admission to Jagannath College, Pintoo came to Dhaka to attend trials for the secondary team of East End Club, which participated in the Second Division. However, following impressive trials, he was given direct entry to the main team. He represented the club in the First Division in both 1957 and 1958.

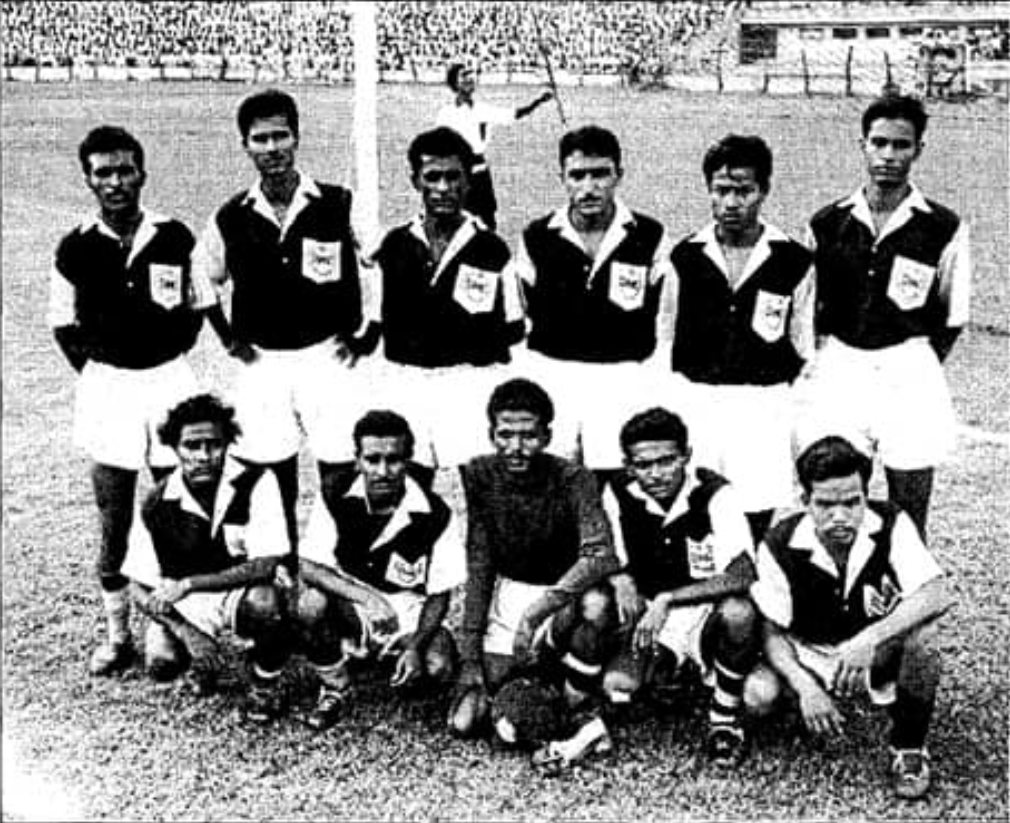
Pintoo sitting second from right with Dhaka Wanderers Club at the 1960 Aga Khan Gold Cup

=== Dhaka Wanderers ===
Pintoo joined Dhaka Wanderers Club in 1959. His standout performance during the club's Aga Khan Gold Cup third-round victory against Sindh Youngmen's Club in his debut season helped the club reach the quarter-finals, where they lost to Ceylon. Pintoo was usually deployed as either a half-back or a center-back in a three-man defence.

In 1960, Pintoo played a crucial role in defense alongside Abdul Gafur Baloch, helping Wanderers become First Division champions by overtaking their arch-rivals and defending champions, Mohammedan SC. In the single league, the club only lost to Mohammedan in the final matchday. That same year, he also contributed to the club's journey to the quarter-finals of the Aga Khan Gold Cup, where Wanderers defeated Pakistan Airlines 3–2 in a third-round replay. However, they were ultimately overwhelmed by Indonesian club PSM Makassar, suffering a 0–8 defeat in the semi-finals.

During a match against the visiting Kolkata Mohammedan, Pintoo man-marked Mohammed Rahmatullah in a notable 2–1 victory for the Wanderers, which earned him praise from the Kolkata club's coach.

=== East Pakistan ===
Following his First Division title triumph with Dhaka Wanderers Club, Pintoo was included in the East Pakistan football team ahead of the 11th National Football Championship, held in Karachi in 1960. He played a crucial role in the team, captained by Zahirul Haque, which secured its first National Championship with a 1–0 victory over Karachi Whites in the final. In 1961, after the championship was made divisional-based, Pintoo began competing with the Khulna Division football team.

=== Mohammedan SC ===
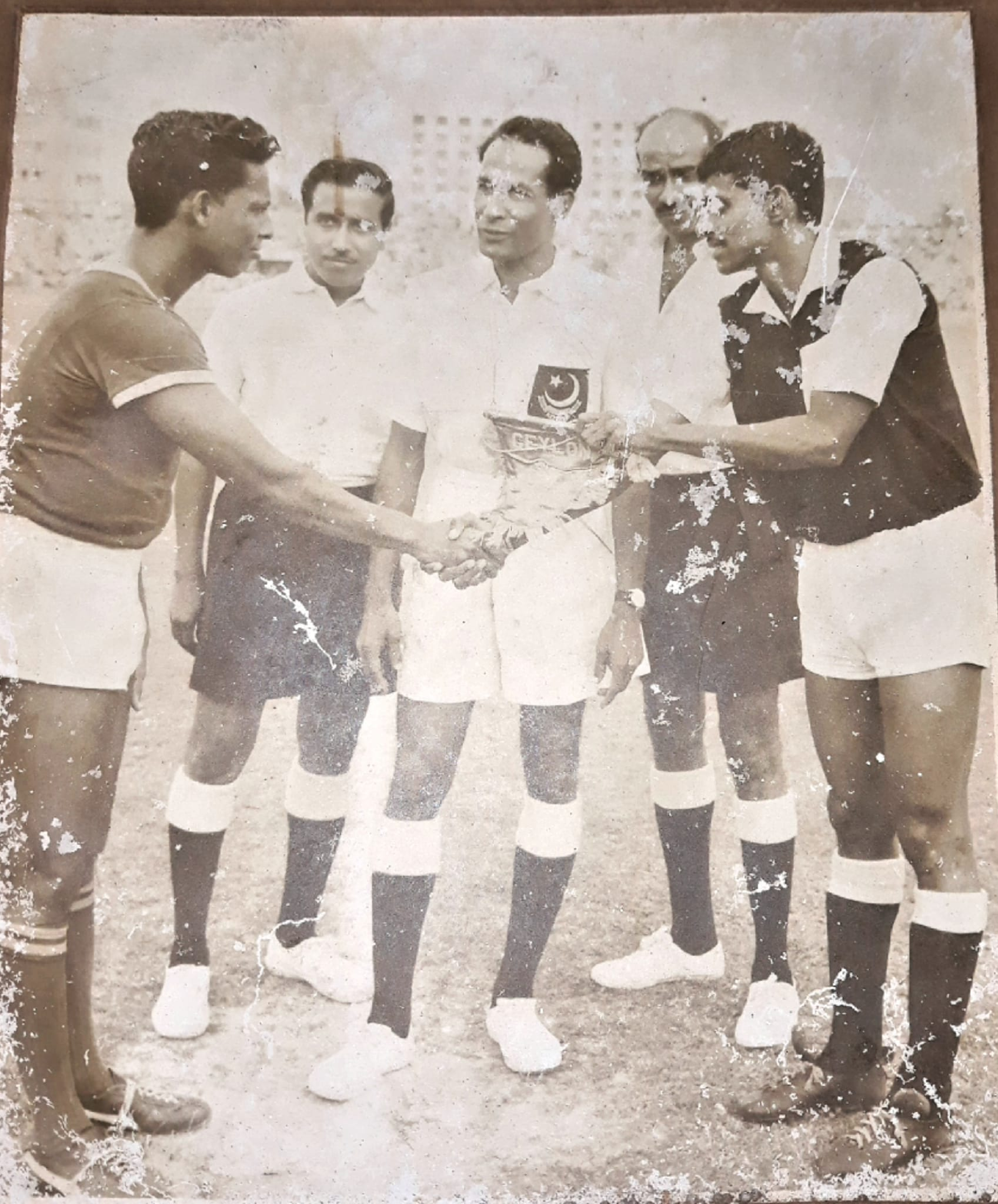
Ceylon Colts captain A.Zainulabdeen and Dhaka Mohammedan captain Pintoo (right) shaking hands before kickoff at the 1968 Aga Khan Gold Cup final.

In 1961, Pintoo joined Mohammedan SC, where he enjoyed a highly successful career. During his time with the club, he won the First Division title six times and the Aga Khan Gold Cup twice. On 7 July 1966, he played a key role in the final of the All-Pakistan Mohammad Ali Bogra Memorial Tournament, leading his team to victory over Dhaka Wanderers in Rawalpindi. Pintoo also served as the club captain from 1968 until his retirement in 1975, succeeding Abdullah Rahi. Under his leadership, the Black and Whites won the tenth Aga Khan Gold Cup in Dhaka in 1968, where Pintoo led the team to a commanding 5–0 victory over the Ceylon Colts XI.

He also guided Mohammedan to First Division titles in 1969 and 1975, with the 1969 title won as unbeaten champions. In 1972, he captained the team to their first Independence Cup triumph, defeating East End Club 3–1. On 11 May 1972, Pintoo led Mohammedan in an exhibition match against Mohun Bagan AC, the first foreign football club to visit independent Bangladesh, which ended in a narrow 0–1 defeat. Notably, in 1974, he participated in the Bordoloi Trophy held in Guwahati, India as a guest player for Rahmatganj MFS. In 1975, after leading Mohammedan to their first league title following the country's independence, Pintoo announced his retirement.

== International career ==
=== East Pakistan ===
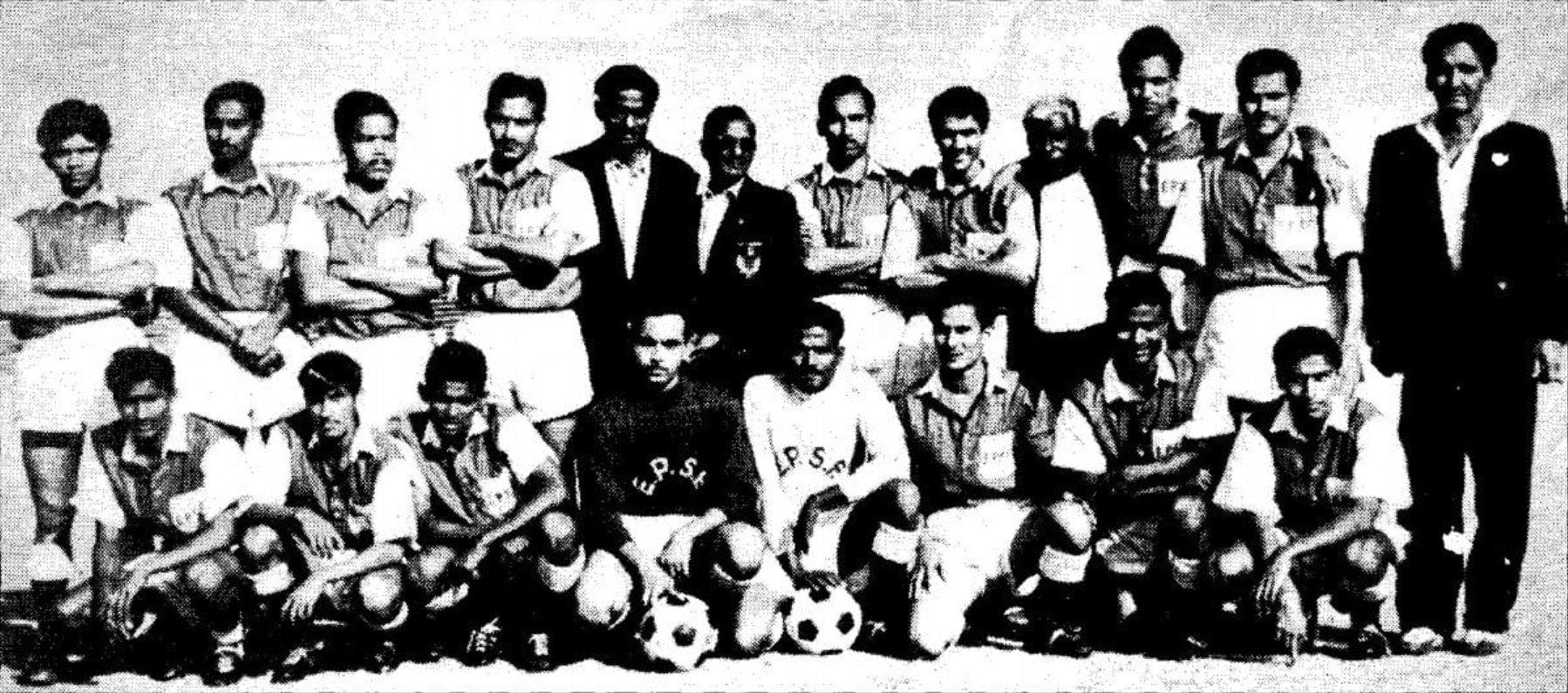
Pintoo sitting third from left with the East Pakistan team before their friendly against China in 1963.

On 24 January 1963, Pintoo represented the East Pakistan football team in an exhibition match against the touring China national football team. The game, held in Dhaka, saw East Pakistan suffer a heavy 1–11 defeat. On 2 September 1962, he played for the East Pakistan XI in an exhibition match against the Pakistan national team in Dhaka, which they lost 2–4. The game, arranged by the East Pakistan Sports Federation, was held as a charity match to raise funds for the victims of the regional flood. In 1967, Pintoo was appointed captain of the East Pakistan team, a role he held until 1970. In 1968, he captained the team in a 2–3 defeat against the South Korean club Yangzee FC in Dhaka. Under his leadership, the team achieved its first international success by winning the King Mahendra Cup in Nepal in 1970. East Pakistan defeated Border Security Force team from India by 2–0 in the title-deciding game of the tournament, held in a round-robin league format.

=== Pakistan ===
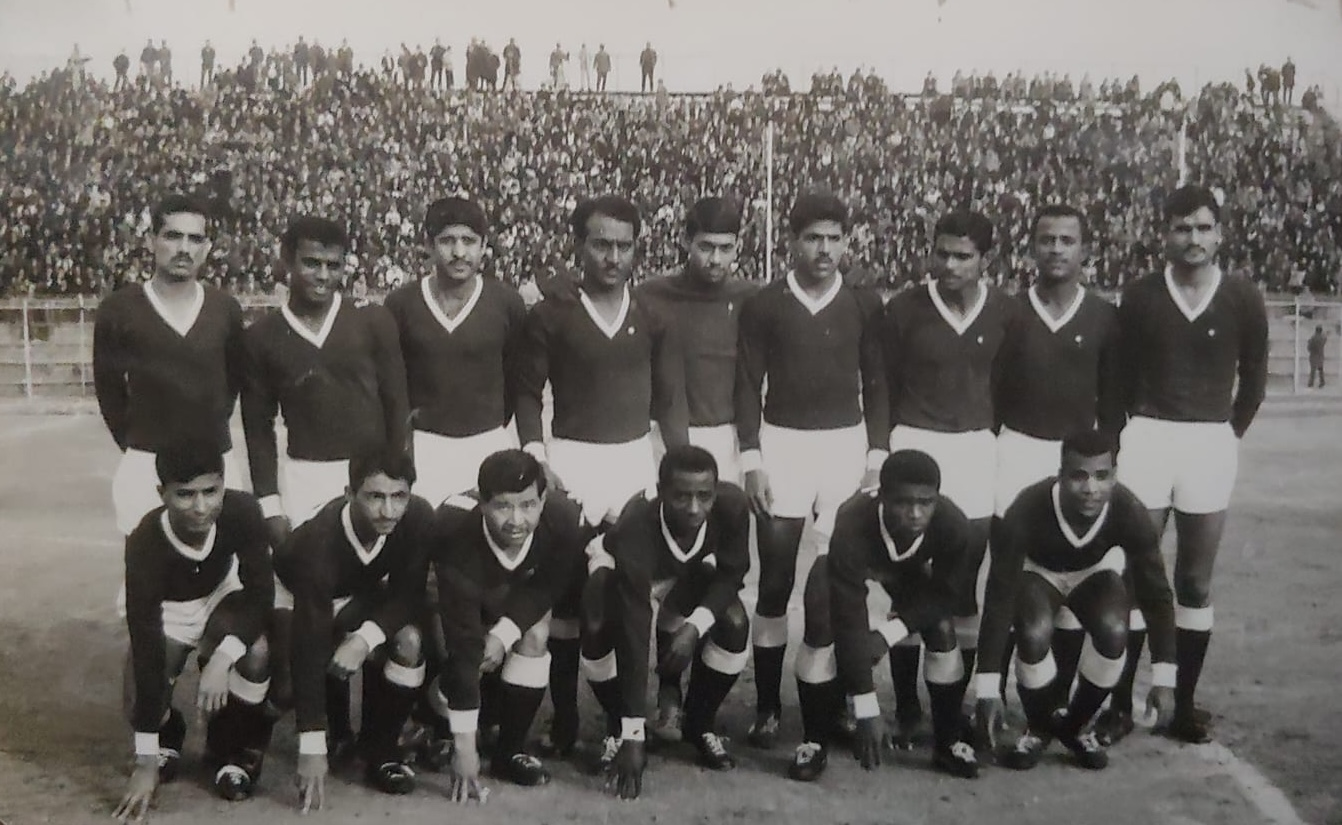
Pintoo standing third from right with the PFF XI team at the 1970 Friendship Cup

In 1969, Pintoo made his debut for the Pakistan national team during the Jaam-e-Doosti Cup (Friendship Cup) in Tehran, Iran. During the tournament, Pakistan faced the Soviet club Spartak Moscow and the Turkish team Mersin Talim Yurdu, alongside the national sides of Iraq and Iran. In the same year, he participated in the 1969 RCD Cup held in Turkey. Pintoo was one of four East Pakistani players included in the team, alongside him were Shahidur Rahman Shantoo, Hafizuddin Ahmed, and Golam Sarwar Tipu. The team, coached by Mohammad Amin, lost 2–4 against both Turkey and Iran, with Pintoo playing in both matches. The following year, Pintoo was chosen to be part of the national team which competed under the name of Pakistan Football Federation XI for the second Jaam-e-Doosti Cup, and later participated in the 1970 RCD Cup held in Iran, alongside East Pakistani players Hafizuddin Ahmed and Khandoker Mohammad Nurunnabi.

=== Shadhin Bangla ===
In 1971, Pintoo was initially preparing to fight on the frontlines during the Bangladesh Liberation War, having completed his arms and ammunition training at the Balughat camp in West Bengal. However, his close friend Abdul Jalil and his wife urged him to join the Shadhin Bangla football team formed to aid the war of independence. After receiving a letter from Syed Nazrul Islam, the acting president of the provisional government, requesting his participation, Pintoo agreed. Despite his initial reluctance, his wife's encouragement and Jalil's insistence led him to travel to Kolkata, where he joined the team alongside other players.

Pintoo was eventually appointed captain of the Shadhin Bangla football team, with his Mohammedan teammate Pratap Shankar Hazra serving as vice-captain. The team played their first official match on 25 July 1971 against Nadia XI in Nadia District. Before the match, Pintoo, with permission from Nadia's district administrator DK Ghosh, proudly waved the national flag, becoming the first person to hoist the Bangladesh flag on foreign soil. The team went on to play a total of 16 friendly matches during their tour of India.

The DC (DK Gosh) told our team official that the team captain and players will wave the flag, not the officials. On July 25, we waved our flag in front of around 30 thousand people at the venue. That was the first time Bangladesh’s flag was waved on foreign soil. After we returned to Kolkata and there was much discussion about the incident all over India. Later we learnt that the DC lost his job for allowing us to wave the flag without his superior’s permission. He was released immediately after that event.

— Pintoo on the flag waving incident on 25 July 1971.

=== Bangladesh ===
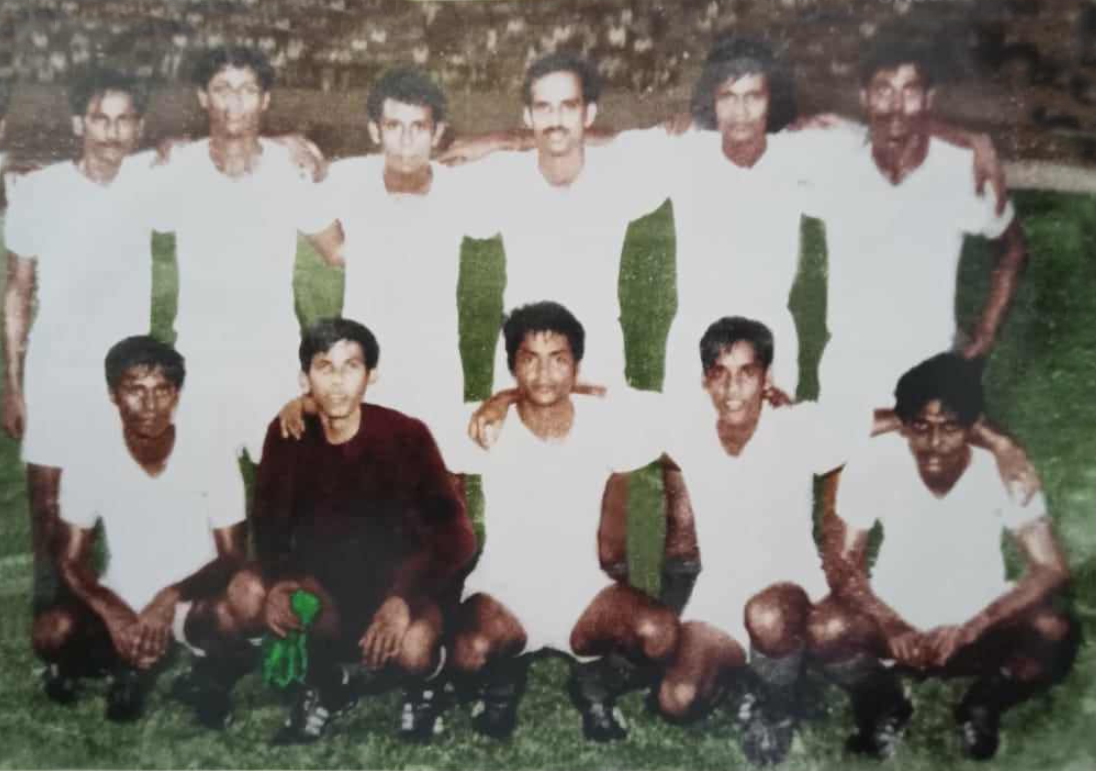
Pintoo (sitting first from right) with the Bangladesh national team at the 1973 Merdeka Tournament in Malaysia

On 13 February 1972, Pintoo captained Bangladesh XI against President XI, in what was the first football match held in independent Bangladesh. The highly anticipated game held at the Dhaka Stadium, which ended in a 0–2 defeat for Pintoo's team, was attended by Bangladesh's President Sheikh Mujibur Rahman.

On 13 May 1972, Pintoo captained Dhaka XI, the unofficial Bangladesh national team, in an exhibition match against the touring Indian club Mohun Bagan AC, led by Chuni Goswami. The game ended in a 1–0 victory for Dhaka, with Kazi Salahuddin scoring the only goal in front of more than 35,000 spectators at the Dhaka Stadium. He also captained Dhaka XI to a runner-up finish in the Bordoloi Trophy in Guwahati, India, losing the final replay 5–0 to East Bengal Club.

In 1973, he was included in the first Bangladesh football team by coach Sheikh Shaheb Ali, who previously managed the Dhaka XI. Pintoo captained the team in their first international tournament at the 1973 Merdeka Tournament. He made his international debut for Bangladesh against Thailand. The game ended as a 2–2 draw, with Bangladesh losing the tie-breakers 5–6. On 13 August, Pintoo led the team to their first victory, defeating hosts Singapore 1–0 in an exhibition match played after the Merdeka Cup concluded.

== Post-playing career ==
After retiring from football, Pintoo briefly coached Mohammedan SC in 1977. In 1978, he received a short-term diploma in football coaching from England. He later became the joint editor of the Bangladesh Football Federation (BFF) in 1979.

On 20 July 1979, Pintoo served as the head coach of the national team during a 1–0 defeat to South Korea B in a friendly match played in Dhaka.

Pintoo was the manager of the national team coached by Abdur Rahim at the 1980 AFC Asian Cup in Kuwait.

He served as the Director of Sports of the National Sports Council (NSC) from 1980 to 1982. Additionally, he was the Deputy Chef-de-Mission of the Bangladesh contingent at the 1995 South Asian Games in Madras, India, and the 2004 South Asian Games in Islamabad, Pakistan. Notably, he had the honor of lighting the torch at both the 1993 South Asian Games in Dhaka and the 6th Bangladesh Games in 1996. In 1978, he received the National Sports Award.

He received the Independence Day Award (1995) in the sports category by the Government of Bangladesh.

In 2016, BFF president, Kazi Salahuddin, alleged that Pintoo asked him for funds to withdraw the nomination paper of the president post in the 2012 BFF election. The allegation was later denied by Pintoo.

== Personal life and death ==
Pintoo's younger brother, Moyeenuddin, was also a former footballer and played alongside him in Mohammedan SC. Pintoo was married to Hasina Begum, with whom he had three daughters and one son. On 7 February 2019, Begum died while undegoing treatment at LabAid Hospital.

Pintoo died on 18 November 2024, at the age of 81, as a result of multiple organ failure.

== Honours ==
Dhaka Wanderers

- Dhaka First Division League: 1960

Mohammedan SC (Dhaka)

- Dhaka First Division League: 1961, 1963, 1965, 1966, 1969, 1975
- Independence Cup: 1972
- Aga Khan Gold Cup: 1964, 1968
- Independence Day Tournament: 1963, 1965, 1966

East Pakistan

- National Football Championship: 1960
- King Mahendra Cup: 1970

=== Awards and accolades ===
- 1978 − National Sports Awards.
- 1995 − Independence Day Award.

== See also ==
- List of association football players capped by two senior national teams
- List of Bangladesh national football team managers

== Bibliography ==
- Mahmud, Dulal (2020). খেলার মাঠে মুক্তিযুদ্ধ (transl. Liberation war in the playground) (in Bengali). Bishhoshahitto Bhobon. ISBN 978-984-8218-31-0.
- Mahmud, Dulal (2014). পাকিস্তান জাতীয় দল বাঙালি খেলোয়াড় (transl. Bengali players in the Pakistan national team) (in Bengali). Bishhoshahitto Bhobon.
- Alam, Masud (2017). ফুটবলের গল্প ফুটবলারদের গল্প (transl. The story of football the story of footballers) (in Bengali). Bishhoshahitto Bhobon. ISBN 9789849134688.
- Mahmud, Noman (2018). ফুটবল পায়ে মুক্তির যুদ্ধ (transl. Liberation war fought by football) (in Bengali). Agamee Prakashani. ISBN 978-984-8218-31-0.
