= Abdur Rahim (footballer) =

Bangladeshi footballer (1932–2004)

- Rahim in the 1980s

Personal information
- Full name: Abdur Rahim
- Date of birth: 1932
- Place of birth: Rokanpur, Dacca, Bengal Presidency, British India (present-day Dhaka, Bangladesh)
- Date of death: 30 October 2004 (aged 72)
- Place of death: Dhaka, Bangladesh
- Position: Left winger

Senior career*
Years	Team	Apps	(Gls)
1948–1950	Dhaka Wanderers		
1951–1952	Fire Service		
1952	Kolkata Mohammedan		
1953	East Bengal		
1953–1956	Dhaka Wanderers		

International career
1955	East Pakistan		
1955	Pakistan		

Managerial career
- 1958–1972: Dhaka Wanderers
- 1975: Bangladesh
- 1975–1980: Victoria
- 1978: Bangladesh U19 (assistant)
- 1979–1981: Bangladesh
- 1981–1982: Abahani Krira Chakra
- 1982: Bangladesh
- 1983: Dhaka Mohammedan (assistant)
- 1983: Bangladesh
- 1984–1986: Rahmatganj MFS
- 1985: Bangladesh
- 1987: Bangladesh
- 1990: Bangladesh U16
- 1990: Bangladesh
- 1994–1995: Fakirerpool YMC
- * Club domestic league appearances and goals

Abdur Rahim (Bengali: আবদুর রহিম; 1932 – 30 October 2004) was a Bangladeshi football manager and player. He represented the Pakistan national team during his playing career and was later head coach of the Bangladesh national team on a record seven different appointments, including for the country's maiden AFC Asian Cup appearance. In 1980 he received the National Sports Awards, for his contribution to Bangladeshi football.

== Early life ==
Abdur Rahim was born in Dhaka in 1932.

== Club career ==
He started playing for local club Dhaka Sporting and later played in the First Division for Dhaka Wanderers, as a ninth grader student at St. Gregory's High School. With the Wanderers he won the league title in 1950, before moving to Fire Service AC in 1951. He later played in the Calcutta Football League with Mohammedan SC and East Bengal. He scored a brace on his debut for Kolkata Mohammedan against Kalighat FC. In 1953, he returned to Dhaka Wanderers, winning the First Division title for four straight seasons from 1952 to 1956. Rahim also took part in the National Championship with East Pakistan in both 1953 and 1955. He was forced to retire after suffering a serious leg injury against East Pakistan Press during a league fixture in 1956.

== International career ==
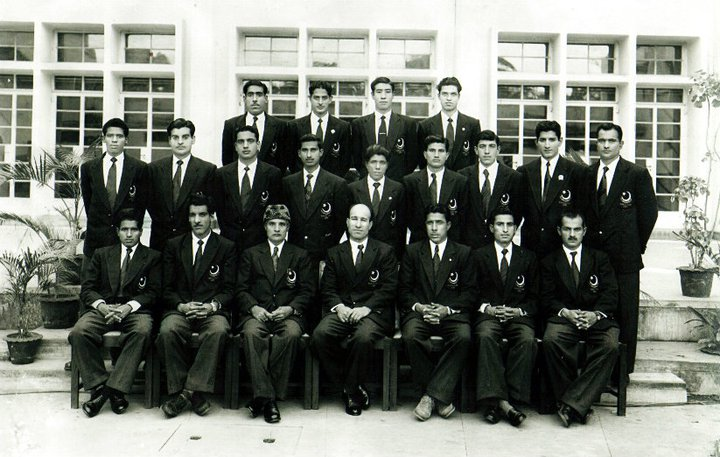
Pakistan national team in 1955, with Rahim (fourth from middle left).

On 14 December 1955, Rahim represented East Pakistan in an exhibition match against the Pakistan national team. His team were defeated 1–3.

His performances that year earned him a call up to the Pakistan national team for the 1955 Asian Quadrangular Football Tournament held in Dhaka. Although he did not make an appearance during the tournament, he made his debut in a friendly against the India later that month, coming on as a substitute for Masood Fakhri and setting up a goal for his East Pakistani teammate, Tajul Islam Manna.

== Coaching career ==
=== Club ===
In 1958, only a couple of years after ending his playing career, Rahim took charge of Dhaka Wanderers and guided the club to their seventh league title, having won the previous six as a player. Rahim remained at the helm until 1972, in a period which saw the club rarely challenging for the league title. In 1973, Rahim received advanced coaching training from Germany. In 1975, Rahim managed Victoria SC, and although during his tenure at the club they languished in mid-table, he notably converted central defender Sheikh Mohammad Aslam into a forward in 1979. Aslam went on to score a record 177 domestic league goals over the next two decades. He is also credited for scouting Khurshid Alam Babul, a player who later captained the national team.

In 1981, he coached Abahani Krira Chakra to the club's third First Division title. In 1982, after Abahani lost the league title to arch-rivals Mohammedan SC, Rahim departed the club, stating "আমি কুফা কোচ আর কোচিং করবো না" (lit. 'I am a cursed coach I won't coach anymore'). In 1983, Rahim joined Mohammedan as assistant to head coach Golam Sarwar Tipu. Following his stint with Mohammedan, Rahim went onto coach mid-table club Rahmatganj MFS, before focusing on grassroots football. Rahim was also one of the first coaches in the country to introduce monthly salaries for players in the domestic league during his time with Victoria.

=== International ===

Rahim's chosen starting XI in the opening match of the 1980 AFC Asian Cup against North Korea. Bangladesh lost the game 2–3 with their goals coming from Salahuddin and Chunnu.

Rahim's chosen starting XI against Indonesia at the 1986 FIFA World Cup qualification – AFC first round. Bangladesh won the game 2–1 with goals from Kaiser and Chunnu. This marked the country's first victory in a FIFA World Cup qualifier.

In 1975, Rahim was appointed head coach of the Bangladesh national football team for the 1975 Merdeka Cup held in Kuala Lumpur, Malaysia. Bangladesh lost six of their seven games and managed only a 1–1 draw with Thailand. During the tournament, the team received news of the Assassination of Sheikh Mujibur Rahman and the 15 August 1975 Bangladeshi coup d'état. Unable to withdraw from the tournament, the team protested before their game against South Korea, keeping the national flag at half-mast and wearing a black badge. Rahim's side lost 0–4. Later, Rahim served as the assistant coach of Bangladesh U19 during the 1978 AFC Youth Championship held in Dhaka.

In October 1979, Rahim was appointed as the head of the Bangladesh national team for the 1980 AFC Asian Cup. Despite almost a year of training, Bangladesh failed to secure a victory in any of the tournament games, although they put up a good fight against North Korea and Syria, both of which ended in defeat. Rahim's Bangladesh squad was one of the youngest in the tournament, featuring teenage forwards Mohammed Mohsin and Abdus Salam Murshedy.

Rahim continued to coach the national team in the 1982 and 1983 editions of the President's Gold Cup. He achieved his first victory as head coach during the 1983 edition, guiding his team to a 4–2 win over Nepal on September 5, 1983. The game is also renowned for Ashrafuddin Ahmed Chunnu's hat-trick, marking the first in the national team's history. Rahim remained in charge during the Merdeka Cup later that year.

In January 1985, Rahim took charge of the national team for the fifth time in preparation for the 1986 FIFA World Cup qualification – AFC first round. It marked the first time the country would participate in the FIFA World Cup qualifiers. After three consecutive defeats, Rahim's side secured their first victory in the qualifiers by defeating Indonesia 2–0 at the Bangladesh Army Stadium on 2 April 1985. Bangladesh finished their qualifying campaign at the bottom of their group with two victories and four defeats from six games.

Rahim returned once again as the national team coach for the 1987 South Asian Games held in Calcutta. Rahim's side entered the tournament without key players Mohamed Mohsin, Sheikh Aslam and Ranjit Saha, as Bangladesh failed to qualify for the finals for the first time. They also lost the bronze medal match to Pakistan.

Rahim served as head coach of Bangladesh U16 at the 1990 AFC U-16 Championship qualifiers and left a notable mark despite not advancing to the main round. Draws against Japan U16 and Thailand U16, coupled with a 4–0 victory over Malaysia U16, secured a group runners-up finish. His seventh and final stint as senior national team coach was at the 1990 Asian Games, where Bangladesh finished at the bottom of their group with heavy defeats against Asian giants Japan and Saudi Arabia.

== Personal life and death ==
On 30 October 2004, Rahim died at the age of 72 at his residence in Rokonpur, Dhaka. He was survived by his wife and two sons.

He suffered from kidney disease and underwent treatment at Bangladesh Medical College.

== Managerial statistics ==
Team	From	To	Record							
Team	From	To	G	W	D	L	GF	GA	GD	Win %
Bangladesh	July 1975	August 1975	7	0	1	6	3	31	−28	0.00
Bangladesh	October 1979	May 1981	5	0	1	4	3	18	−15	0.00
Bangladesh	August 1982	August 1982	0	0	0	0	0	0	+0	—
Bangladesh	August 1983	September 1983	5	2	1	2	5	4	+1	40.00
Bangladesh	25 January 1985	12 April 1985	6	2	0	4	5	10	−5	33.33
Bangladesh	October 1987	November 1987	3	1	0	2	3	2	+1	33.33
Bangladesh	September 1990	October 1990	2	0	0	2	0	7	−7	0.00

== Honours ==
=== Player ===
Dhaka Wanderers

- Dhaka First Division League: 1950, 1953, 1954, 1955, 1956

Pakistan

- Asian Quadrangular Football Tournament runner-up: 1955

=== Manager ===
Dhaka Wanderers

- Dhaka First Division League: 1960

Abahani Krira Chakra

- Dhaka First Division League: 1981
- Federation Cup: 1982

=== Awards and accolades ===
- 1980 − National Sports Awards
- 1982 − Sports Writers Association's Best Football Coach Award

== See also ==
- List of Bangladesh national football team managers

== Bibliography ==
- Dulal, Mahmud (2014). পাকিস্তান জাতীয় দল বাঙালি খেলোয়াড় (transl. Bengali players in the Pakistan national team) (in Bengali). Bishhoshahitto Bhobon.
- Dulal, Mahmud (2020). খেলার মাঠে মুক্তিযুদ্ধ (transl. Liberation war in the playground) (in Bengali). Bishhoshahitto Bhobon. ISBN 978-984-8218-31-0.
- Alam, Masud (2017). ফুটবলের গল্প ফুটবলারদের গল্প (transl. The story of football the story of footballers) (in Bengali). Bishhoshahitto Bhobon. ISBN 9789849134688.
