= Andrés Cruciani =

Argentine footballer and manager (born 1962)

Personal information
- Full name: Diego Andrés Cruciani
- Date of birth: July 14, 1962 (age 64)
- Place of birth: Bahía Blanca, Argentina
- Height: 1.82 m (5 ft 11 1/2 in)
- Position: Defender

Senior career*
Years	Team	Apps	(Gls)
1973–1978	Juventud	71	(3)
1979	Sarmiento	21	(4)
1980	Bella Vista	19	(1)
1981–1982	Estudiantes	42	(1)
1983–1985	Club Cipolletti	49	(3)

International career
1981	Argentina U-20	4	(0)

Managerial career
- 1995: Banfield (assistant coach)
- 1996–1997: Independiente (assistant coach)
- 1998: Centenario
- 1998: Club Renato Cesarini
- 1999: CA Lanús (Youth Coach)
- 2000: Independiente (assistant coach)
- 2001: Tampa Bay Mutiny (Technical Coach)
- 2001–2002: Club Cipolletti
- 2002–2003: Haiti
- 2004–2005: Centenario
- 2005–2006: Bangladesh
- 2006: Bangladesh U23
- 2007–2007: Dhaka Abahani
- 2009–2011: Maldives
- 2021–2022: Saif Sporting Club
- 2023–2024: Dhaka Abahani
Medal record
Men's football
Representing Bangladesh (as manager)
SAFF Championship
Runner-up	2005 Pakistan
- * Club domestic league appearances and goals

Diego Andrés Cruciani (born 14 July 1962 in Bahía Blanca) is an Argentine football coach.

== Career ==
The defender played in his career for Juventud, Sarmiento, Bella Vista, Estudiantes and Club Cipolletti before he retired after a knee injury in summer 1985.

== International career ==
Cruciani was a member of the Argentina national under-20 football team in 1981.

== Coaching career ==
Cruciani was the head coach of the Bangladesh national football team. Under his guidance, the team improved smoothly and became the runners-up of the SAFF championship. He also served as head coach of the Bangladesh U23 team during the 2006 South Asian Games in Colombo.

After leaving the post, Cruciani continued his career in Bangladesh by coaching B. League side, Abahani Limited Dhaka in 2007. During his time, he brought three Argentine players to the club.
