= Pakistanis in Denmark =

Danish Pakistanis
Total population
- 29,418 (2026 official estitmate)

Languages
- Urdu, Punjabi, and other languages of Pakistan; Danish

Religion
- Sunni Islam Minority Ahmadiyya and Shia Islam

Related ethnic groups
- Pakistani diaspora

Danish Pakistanis (Danish: Dansk-pakistanere) form the country's fifth largest community of migrants and descendants from a non-Western country, with 17.084 migrants and 12.334 locally born people of Pakistani descent as of 1 January 2026 according to the latest figures published by the government of Denmark.

== Migration history ==
The earliest Pakistani migrants came to Denmark in the 1960s and 1970s as migrant workers, a large portion from Punjab, in particular Kharian and nearby regions, as it is in Norway as well. Though the Danish government restricted labour migration in 1973, the Pakistani community continued to grow, largely through family reunification and transnational marriages. The spouses in these transnational marriages came largely from Pakistan, but roughly 3,000 were drawn from among the community of British Pakistanis as well. Beginning in the 1990s, the Danish People's Party and the Social Democrats began to call for restrictions on family reunification in order to control the growth of immigrant communities. Among other restrictions included new laws introduced in early 2000 which require that both parties to transnational marriages be at least 24 years of age, that they must live in their own accommodation of at least twenty m^{2} per person and no more than two persons per room, and that the Denmark-resident applicant for a transnational marriage must have a gross income of kr 8,986. In response to the newly tightened migration requirements, more than a thousand Pakistanis from Denmark established residence in the Swedish border city of Malmö (on the strength of European Union laws on freedom of movement for workers) and applied for family reunification there, taking advantage of the laxity of the Swedish laws in this regard. Most returned to Denmark after the process was complete. One of the more visible signs of this is the increasing number of cars with Swedish license plates in the Copenhagen suburb of Ishøj.

== Religion ==
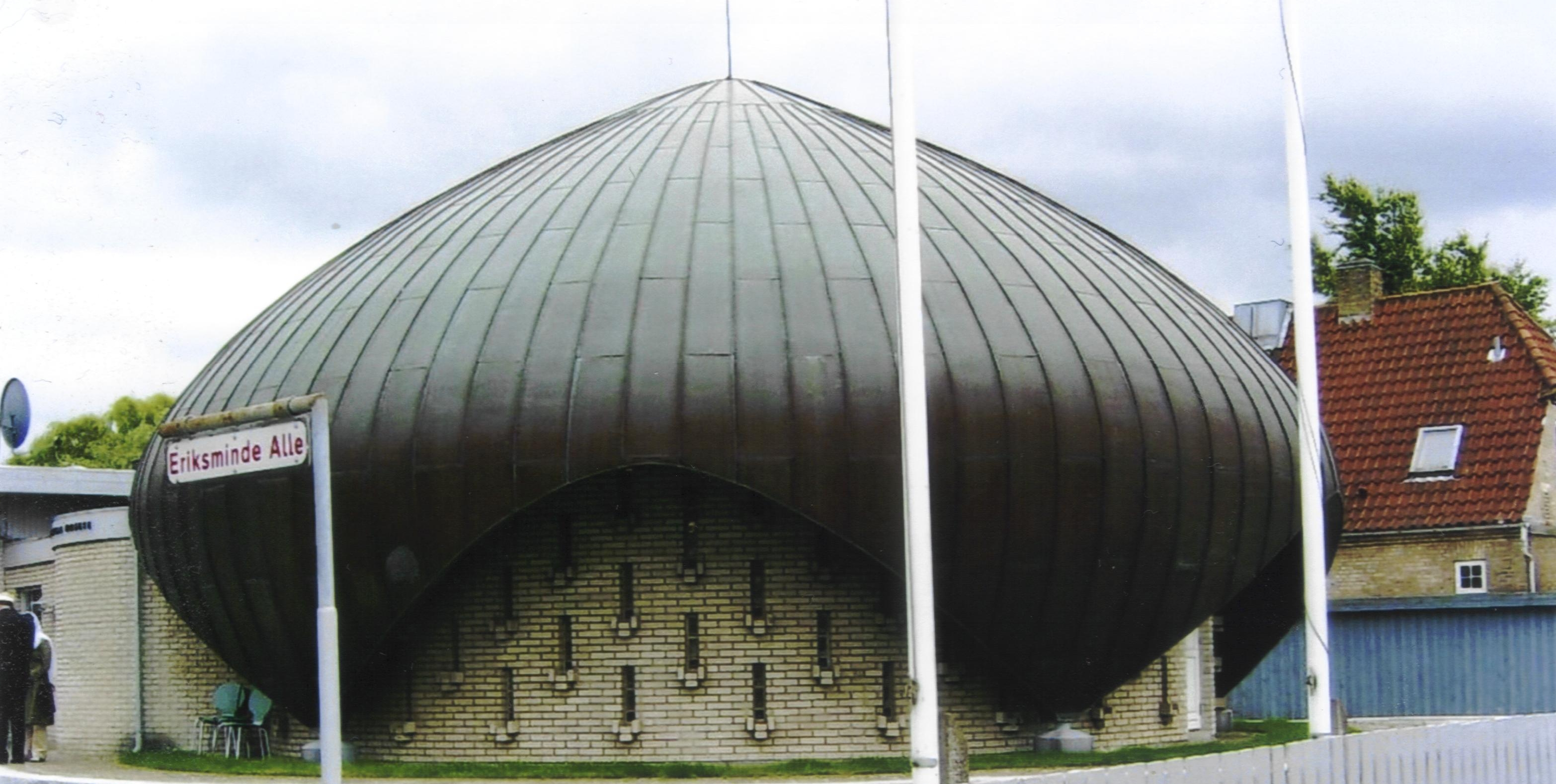
Denmark's oldest mosque, opened in Hvidovre in 1967, is operated by the Pakistan-based Ahmadiyya denomination

Most Pakistanis in Denmark are Muslims. Like in other communities, a number of different movements are found, such as the Sunni Hanafi Barelwi movement is represented by the Muslim Institute in Copenhagen, while the Minhaj-ul-Quran movement has its head office in northwest Nørrebro and also maintains a presence in Amager, Ishøj, Gladsaxe, and Lyngby-Taarbæk. 43% regularly attend prayers at a mosque, the highest among immigrants from Muslim-majority countries and nearly double the average.

Pakistanis in Denmark have set up a number of religious schools. Of the fourteen Muslim schools in Denmark as of 1995, the majority are run by either Pakistanis or Arabs. Denmark has the highest percentage of privately run, publicly funded Muslim schools in Europe however, the presence of independent Muslim schools has drawn debate and criticism from members of the Danish public.

Like other European countries, Denmark also has a minor presence of followers of the Ahmadiyya Muslim Community, a heterodox sect formed during British colonial rule. The first full translation of the meanings of the Qur'an into Danish was performed by an Ahmadi Muslim convert. They also build the first purpose build mosque in Denmark which is located in Hvidovre, Copenhagen & was inaugurated in 1967.

== Lifestyle ==
From the 1970s to the 1990s, it was common for Pakistani migrants in Denmark to use their family social networks back in Pakistan to arrange marriages for their children. Such marriages were often negatively portrayed as "forced marriages" in Danish media, especially in the case of cousin marriages. However, with tightened requirements on transnational marriages, the number of marriages between Pakistanis in Denmark has increased instead. The proportion of such marriages doubled from 20% to 40% between 1989 and 2003. Common Pakistani marriage practises continued among migrants in Denmark with children marrying in their late teens or early twenties (especially for women) and newlyweds continuing to live with the groom's parents. Among the Pakistani youth between the ages of 17 and 27 years, 31% were either married or engaged, about average for immigrants from Muslim-majority countries. However, only 10% had girlfriends or boyfriends. Disagreement about marriage is often a source of intergenerational conflict. Of Pakistani youths with girlfriends or boyfriends, only 31% report that their parents accept their choice. Even parents who accept their children choosing their own spouses generally maintain an expectation of ethnic endogamy. In one widely publicised case in 2006, a 19-year-old girl died in an honor killing by her father and brothers because they disapproved of her choice of spouse. In general, though, attitudes towards marriage show a trend of liberalisation, with parents and their children continuing to expand their boundaries of who is or is not an acceptable marriage partner. In the late 1990s and early 2000s, the divorce rate has also been growing.

== Sports ==
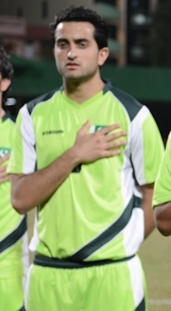
Hassan Bashir with the Pakistan national football team in 2013

Several football players of Pakistani descent born in Denmark have represented the Pakistan national football team.

In 2012, Yousuf Butt, Hassan Bashir, and Mohammad Ali became the first Danish-born players to join the national team. The following year, Yousuf’s brother, Yaqoob Butt, also joined the team. This was followed by the recruitment of Nabil Aslam in 2015, and Adnan Mohammad in 2018, both who have also played in the Danish Superliga, Denmark’s top-tier league. Other Denmark born footballers who represented Pakistan internationally and played in top tier divisions include Abdullah Iqbal, and Mohammad Fazal.

== Employment ==
2003 statistics on immigrants from Muslim-majority countries in Denmark found that Pakistanis had the lowest unemployment rate out of all groups surveyed, at 6.8%. 47% are members of trade unions.

== Socioeconomics ==
=== Media ===
Pakistanis in Denmark were served by six Urdu-language publications as of 2008: Tarjumaan International, a magazine for Asian Community in Europe promoting peace, harmony and mutual interaction among world communities, Al Djihad, a magazine about Islamic and social activities published by Ahmediya Mosque. Binat-e-Islam by Minhaj-ul-Quran, a magazine aimed at young Muslim women. Shaheen, Tanzeem, and Waqar magazines focused on Pakistani culture and politics published on a monthly or bimonthly basis, and Etnica, a multilingual journal which covers immigrant issues and politics in Denmark.

=== Crime ===
According to Statistics Denmark, 0,8% of male Pakistani descendants received a court sentence for violent crime in 2016, four times higher than the national average. This was at the lower end for non-Western immigrant males, where male Somali descendants were at the high end at 3.0%.

=== Health ===
Many Pakistanis in Denmark suffer from vitamin D deficiency. 21% of women and 34% of men have osteopenia. Rates of veiling and staying indoors have been suggested as a reason for vitamin D deficiency.

== Notable people ==
- Kamal Qureshi, medical doctor and politician with the Socialist People's Party
- Waqas Ali Qadri, member of Danish pop group Outlandish
- Nadeem Farooq, politician with the Danish Social Liberal Party
- Sikandar Siddique, former member of the Danish Parliament

== See also ==
- Denmark–Pakistan relations
- Pakistani diaspora
- Immigration to Denmark
- Pakistanis in Finland
- Pakistanis in Norway
- Pakistanis in Sweden
