= Pakistan national football team results (2010–2019) =

The following are the Pakistan national football team results in its official international matches from 2010 to 2019.

== Results ==
Key
Win
Draw
Defeat

=== 2011 ===
21 March 2011 2012 AFC Challenge Cup qualification	Pakistan	0–3	Turkmenistan	Petaling Jaya, Malaysia
		Report	Urazow 6'; Amanow 46'; Garadanow 86'	Stadium: MBPJ Stadium; Attendance: 150; Referee: Akbar Bakhshi Zadeh (Iran)

23 March 2011 2012 AFC Challenge Cup qualification	Pakistan	1–3	India	Petaling Jaya, Malaysia
	Mehmood 32'	Report	Lalpekhlua 67', 90+4'; Dias 90'	Stadium: MBPJ Stadium; Attendance: 100; Referee: Mohammad Al Rshidat (Jordan)

25 March 2011 2012 AFC Challenge Cup qualification	Pakistan	2–0	Chinese Taipei	Petaling Jaya, Malaysia
	Mehmood 26'; Bashir 67'	Report		Stadium: MBPJ Stadium; Attendance: 50; Referee: Mohammad Al Rshidat (Jordan)

29 June 2011 2014 World Cup qualification	Bangladesh	3–0	Pakistan	Dhaka, Bangladesh
18:00 UTC+6	Ameli 1'; Hossain 22'; Karim 56'	Report		Stadium: Bangabandhu National Stadium; Attendance: 5,326; Referee: Mohammad Abu Loum (Jordan)

3 July 2011 2014 World Cup qualification	Pakistan	0–0	Bangladesh	Lahore, Pakistan
20:30 UTC+5		Report		Stadium: Punjab Stadium; Attendance: 3,500; Referee: Ali Abdulnabi (Bahrain)

2 December 2011 2011 SAFF Championship	Bangladesh	0–0	Pakistan	New Delhi, India
		Report		Stadium: Jawaharlal Nehru Stadium; Referee: Timur Faizullin (Kyrgyzstan)

4 December 2011 2011 SAFF Championship	Maldives	0–0	Pakistan	New Delhi, India
		Report		Stadium: Jawaharlal Nehru Stadium; Referee: Nivon Robesh Gamini (Sri Lanka)

6 December 2011 2011 SAFF Championship	Pakistan	1–1	Nepal	New Delhi, India
	Ishaq 49' (pen.)	Report	Khawas 37'	Stadium: Jawaharlal Nehru Stadium; Referee: Nagor Amir Noor Mohamed (Malaysia)

=== 2012 ===
19 November 2012 Friendly	Singapore	4–0	Pakistan	Jurong West, Singapore
	Jiayi Shi 2'; Amri 30'; Ishak 77'; Đurić 90+6'	Report		Stadium: Jurong West Stadium

=== 2013 ===
6 February 2013 Friendly	Nepal	0–1	Pakistan	Kathmandu, Nepal
		Report	Bashir 90+1'	Stadium: Dasarath Rangasala Stadium

9 February 2013 Friendly	Nepal	0–1	Pakistan	Kathmandu, Nepal
14:30 UTC+05:45		Report	Mujahid 65'	Stadium: Dasarath Rangasala Stadium

12 February 2013 Friendly	Maldives	1–1	Pakistan	Malé, Maldives
21:00 UTC+05:00	Abdulla 48'	Report	Hameed 90+4'	Stadium: Rasmee Dhandu Stadium

14 February 2013 Friendly	Maldives	3–0	Pakistan	Malé, Maldives
21:00 UTC+05:00	Umair 59'; Ashfaq 67', 90+1'	Report		Stadium: Rasmee Dhandu Stadium

17 March 2013 2014 AFC Challenge Cup qualification	Tajikistan	1–0	Pakistan	Bishkek, Kyrgyzstan
12:00 UTC+6	Makhmudov 89'	Report		Stadium: Spartak Stadium; Attendance: 400; Referee: Masoud Tufayelieh (Syria)

19 March 2013 2014 AFC Challenge Cup qualification	Kyrgyzstan	1–0	Pakistan	Bishkek, Kyrgyzstan
16:00 UTC+6	Tetteh 1'	Report		Stadium: Spartak Stadium; Attendance: 12,000; Referee: Ammar Al-Jeneibi (UAE)

21 March 2013 2014 AFC Challenge Cup qualification	Pakistan	2–0	Macau	Bishkek, Kyrgyzstan
12:00 UTC+6	Bashir 44' (pen.); Kaleemullah 70'	Report		Stadium: Spartak Stadium; Attendance: 800; Referee: Jameel Abdulhusin (Bahrain)

20 August 2013 Friendly	Afghanistan	3–0	Pakistan	Kabul, Afghanistan
16:30 UTC+04:30	Ahmadi 19'; Hatifie 53'; Mohammadi 72'	Report		Stadium: AFF Stadium

1 September 2013 2013 SAFF Championship	India	1–0	Pakistan	Kathmandu, Nepal
18:30 UTC+5:45	Ishaq 14' (o.g.)	Report		Stadium: Halchowk Stadium; Referee: Hettikamkanamge Perera (Sri Lanka)

3 September 2013 2013 SAFF Championship	Nepal	1–1	Pakistan	Kathmandu, Nepal
18:30 UTC+5:45	Magar 90+2'	Report	Bashir 14'	Stadium: Dasarath Rangasala Stadium; Referee: Saleh Al Hethlol (Saudi Arabia)

5 September 2013 2013 SAFF Championship	Bangladesh	1–2	Pakistan	Kathmandu, Nepal
15:30 UTC+5:45	Ameli 30'	Report	Ishaq 36'; Kalim 90+2'	Stadium: Halchowk Stadium; Referee: Saleh Al Hethlol (Saudi Arabia)

13 October 2013 2013 Philippine Peace Cup	Chinese Taipei	0–1	Pakistan	Bacolod, Philippines
16:00 UTC+8		Report	Rehman 7'	Stadium: Panaad Stadium; Referee: Wilfredo Bermejo (Philippines)

15 October 2013 2013 Philippine Peace Cup	Philippines	3–1	Pakistan	Bacolod, Philippines
19:00 UTC+8	Reichelt 33'; Greatwich 78'; Schröck 88'	Report	Kaleemullah 15'	Stadium: Panaad Stadium; Referee: Heru Santoso (Indonesia)

=== 2014 ===
19 February 2014 Friendly	Lebanon	3–1	Pakistan	Beirut, Lebanon
20:00 UTC+02:00	Walid Ismail 7'; Awada 16'; Tahan 86'	Report	Kaleemullah 17'	Stadium: Beirut Municipal Stadium

12 October 2014 Friendly	Pakistan	0–2	Palestine	Lahore, Pakistan
15:00 UTC+05:00		Report	Murad Ismail 90'; Jaber 90+3'	Stadium: Punjab Stadium

=== 2015 ===
6 February 2015 Friendly	Pakistan	2–1	Afghanistan	Lahore, Pakistan
	Riaz 18'; Saadullah 90+1'	Report	Sharifi 56'	Stadium: Punjab Stadium

12 March 2015 2018 World Cup qualification	Yemen	3–1	Pakistan	Doha, Qatar
18:30 UTC+3	Al-Matari 3'; Boqshan 56'; Al-Sasi 69'	Report (FIFA); Report (AFC)	Bashir 67' (pen.)	Stadium: Grand Hamad Stadium (Note: Yemen played their home match in Doha, Qatar due to security concerns from the 2014–15 Yemeni coup d'état.); Attendance: 300; Referee: Mohammad Abu Loum (Jordan)

23 March 2015 2018 World Cup qualification	Pakistan	0–0	Yemen	Isa Town, Bahrain (Note: Pakistan was originally scheduled to play their home match on 17 March 2015 (15:00 UTC+5) at Punjab Stadium, Lahore, but it was postponed due to safety and security reasons after the Lahore church bombings and civil unrest in the city. The match was subsequently rescheduled to be played in Bahrain.)
18:30 UTC+3		Report (FIFA); Report (AFC)		Stadium: Khalifa Sports City Stadium; Attendance: 2,000; Referee: Ali Sabah Adday Al-Qaysi (Iraq)

=== 2018 ===
4 September 2018 2018 SAFF Championship	Nepal	1–2	Pakistan	Dhaka, Bangladesh
16:00 UTC+6	Magar 82'	Report	Bashir 36' (pen.); Ali 90+6'	Stadium: Bangabandhu National Stadium; Referee: Mohammad Arafah (Jordan)

6 September 2018 2018 SAFF Championship	Bangladesh	1–0	Pakistan	Dhaka, Bangladesh
19:00 UTC+6	Barman 85'	Report		Stadium: Bangabandhu National Stadium; Referee: Hasan Akrami (Iran)

8 September 2018 2018 SAFF Championship	Pakistan	3–0	Bhutan	Dhaka, Bangladesh
16:00 UTC+6	Riaz 20'; Bashir 29'; Faheem 90+1'	Report		Stadium: Bangabandhu National Stadium; Referee: Hasan Akrami (Iran)

12 September 2018 2018 SAFF Championship S.F	India	3–1	Pakistan	Dhaka, Bangladesh
19:30 UTC+6	Singh 48', 69'; Passi 84'	Report	Bashir 88'	Stadium: Bangabandhu National Stadium; Referee: Sivakorn Pu-udom (Thailand)

16 November 2018 Friendly	Palestine	2–1	Pakistan	Al-Ram, State of Palestine
15:00 UTC+2	Norambuena 36'; Albadawi 78'	Report	Bashir 16'	Stadium: Faisal Al-Husseini International Stadium; Referee: Imad Al-Bouji (Palestine)

=== 2019 ===
6 June 2019 2022 FIFA WCQ – AFC 1st Round	Cambodia	2–0	Pakistan	Phnom Penh, Cambodia
18:30 UTC+7	Chanthea 81'; Sokumpheak 84'	Report		Stadium: Phnom Penh Olympic Stadium; Attendance: 33,706; Referee: Shaun Evans (Australia)

11 June 2019 2022 FIFA WCQ – AFC 1st Round	Pakistan	1–2	Cambodia	Doha, Qatar
19:00 UTC+3	Bashir 18' (pen.)	Report	Sokpheng 64'; Bunheing 89'	Stadium: Hamad bin Khalifa Stadium; Attendance: 300; Referee: Hanna Hattab (Syria)

== Head-to-head records ==
Pakistan national football team head-to-head records (2010–2019)
Opponent	Pld	W	D	L	GF	GA	GD	Pts	Confederation
Afghanistan	2	1	0	1	2	4	–2	3	AFC
Bangladesh	5	1	2	2	2	5	–3	5	AFC
Bhutan	1	1	0	0	3	0	+3	3	AFC
Cambodia	2	0	0	2	1	4	–3	0	AFC
Chinese Taipei	2	2	0	0	3	0	+3	6	AFC
India	3	0	0	3	2	7	–5	0	AFC
Kyrgyzstan	1	0	0	1	0	1	–1	0	AFC
Lebanon	1	0	0	1	1	3	–2	0	AFC
Macau	1	1	0	0	2	0	+2	3	AFC
Maldives	3	0	2	1	1	4	–3	2	AFC
Nepal	5	3	2	0	6	3	+3	11	AFC
Palestine	2	0	0	2	1	4	–3	0	AFC
Philippines	1	0	0	1	1	3	–2	0	AFC
Singapore	1	0	0	1	0	4	–4	0	AFC
Tajikistan	1	0	0	1	0	1	–1	0	AFC
Turkmenistan	1	0	0	1	0	3	–3	0	AFC
Yemen	2	0	1	1	1	3	–2	1	AFC
Total	34	9	7	18	26	48	–22	34	
