= Iltaf Ahmed =

British-Pakistani footballer

Ahmed Iltaf
Personal information
- Full name: Ahmed Iltaf
- Date of birth: 2 December 1979 (age 46)
- Place of birth: Bradford, England
- Height: 1.93 m (6 ft 4 in)
- Position: Goalkeeper

International career
Years	Team	Apps	(Gls)
2007–2008	Pakistan	4	(0)

Iltaf Ahmed (Urdu: الطاف احمد; born 2 December 1979) is a former footballer who played as a goalkeeper. Born in England, he represented the Pakistan national football team.

== Club career ==
Ahmed played football at amateur level, and worked simultaneously in a takeaway. Ahmed drifted away from the professional level, after unsuccessful trials at Plymouth and Rangers. In November 2008, Ahmed played at Bradford-based amateur team Carnation, qualifying for the final of the FA Umbro Fives at Wembley.

== International career ==
In 2007, Ahmed was plucked from obscurity when former Pakistan starter Jaffar Khan was unavailable for the 2010 World Cup qualifiers against Iraq. Ahmed was recommended by a member of the national team, Amjad Iqbal and Pakistan football fans who search for eligible Pakistani footballers based aboard.

He was on the bench for the 7–0 hammering by Iraq. For the second leg, Head coach Akhtar Mohiuddin selected him for the starting line up and he made his debut. Ahmed surprised everyone when he prevented Iraq scoring despite their numerous attempts, with the match ending 0–0, and became the new favourite.

In March 2008, Ahmed featured in a two-match friendly series against Nepal at the Pokhara Rangasala Stadium, resulting in a 1–2 defeat and a 2–0 victory. Ahmed was benched in the first two 2008 AFC Challenge Cup qualification games which ended in a 7–1 lose against Sri Lanka, and then get a chance against Guam in a 9–2 victory.

In a mysterious development, despite being called up for the 2008 SAFF Championship, Ahmed failed to go to Pakistan and hence was unavailable for the national team camp, resulting in his international career coming to an end.

== Career statistics ==
=== International ===
Appearances and goals by year and competition
National team	Year	Apps	Goals
Pakistan	2007	1	0
Pakistan	2008	3	0
Total		4	0

== See also ==
- British Asians in association football
- List of Pakistan international footballers born outside Pakistan
