= List of Pakistan international footballers born outside Pakistan =

This is a list of Pakistan international footballers who were born outside Pakistan. The Pakistan national football team has used footballers born outside Pakistan throughout its history with varying success.

== History ==
=== British Raj ===
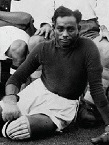
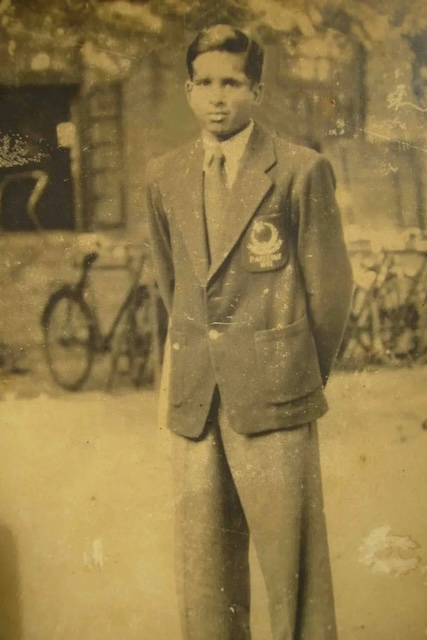
Osman Jan (left) and Moideen Kutty (right)

Before the independence of Pakistan, Kolkata Mohammedan, a club primarily based after the Muslim identity of the subcontinent attracted several players from all over the British Raj. After the partition in 1947, the club lost many of its elite patrons, members as well as players, who chose to move to newly formed Islamic state of Pakistan. One of the players was Osman Jan, who eventually became the first ever captain of the Pakistan national football team in their international debut in 1950. Some sources state he was from Mombasa, East Africa Protectorate, while others state he was from New Delhi.

Moideen Kutty, originally hailing from Malappuram in South India eventually became the fourth captain in history of the national team. In 1947, during the Partition of British India, Kutty was serving in the Royal Indian Air Force, where the majority of his colleagues hailed from the western Punjab Province, which eventually became part of Pakistan after the independence. Consequently, he opted for Pakistan in order to remain alongside his teammates and continue his football journey. Consequently, Kutty became a part of the Royal Pakistan Air Force, which emerged following the partition of the British Indian military forces. He continued his football involvement in his new homeland. He was appointed captain of the Pakistan team for the 1954 Asian Games in Manila. Other players born outside Pakistan include Rashid Chunna from Kolkata, and Ghulam Rabbani from New Delhi.

=== Post-independence ===
In 1989, England-born Jimmy Khan became the first overseas player to be called up to play for the Pakistan national football team, where he made a single appearance at the 1990 FIFA World Cup qualification on 10 February 1989 against the United Arab Emirates.

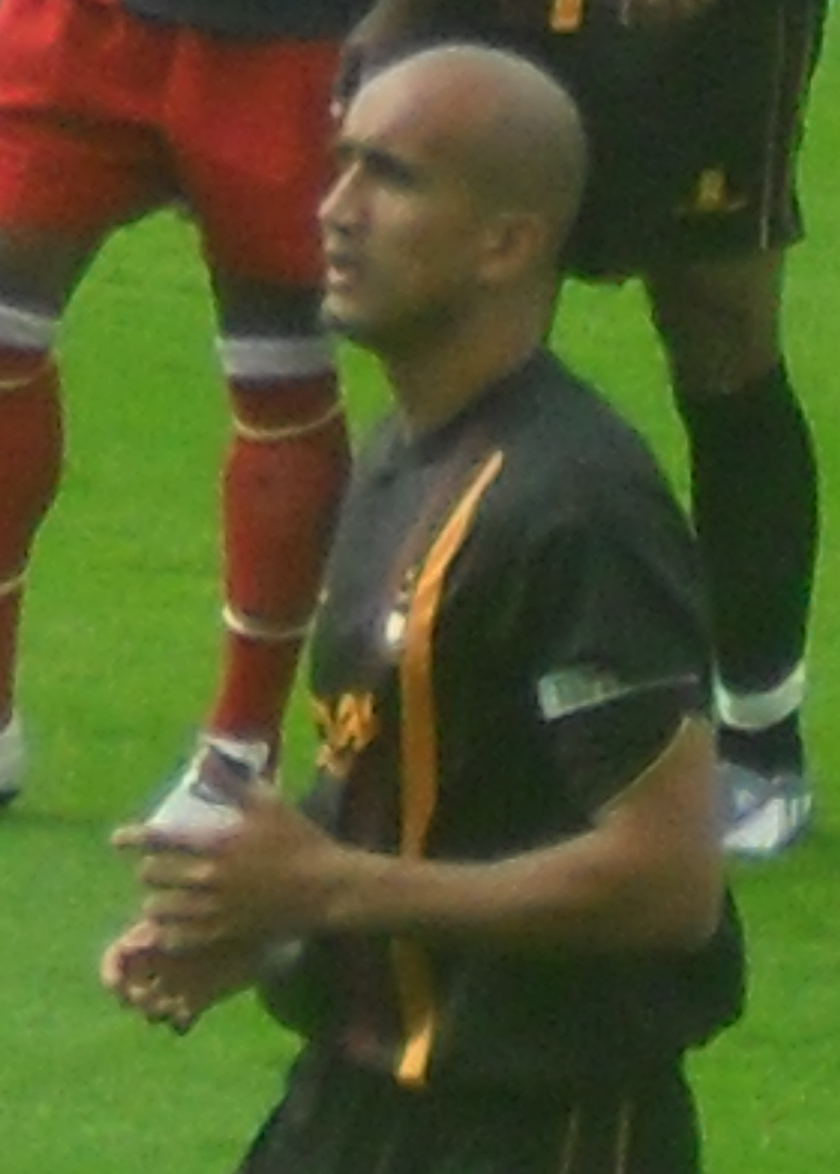
Zesh Rehman made his debut with Pakistan in 2005

On 12 June 2005, Usman Gondal became the second foreign born player to represent Pakistan during a match against India. The same year, Premier League club Fulham player Zesh Rehman made his international debut for Pakistan in the 2005 SAFF Gold Cup. In 2007, the recruitment of overseas players intensified for the 2010 FIFA World Cup qualification against Iraq with the inclusion of Adnan Ahmed, Amjad Iqbal, and Iltaf Ahmed. Adam Karim and Azeem Razwan were also included in the squad, however they failed to make the international debut. The following year, Atif Bashir and Kashif Siddiqi also joined the national side. For the 2009 SAFF Championship, Reis Ashraf and Shabir Khan were included.

In 2011, Australia based Ahmad Akbar Khan became the first non-English player to feature for Pakistan in a test match against Palestine. Throughout the years, the presence of overseas players was generally not well received by some local stakeholders, as it was felt that they did not improve the level of the team or accused them of lack of commitment because of their difficulty to join the team 15 days before the training camps. Former players such as Mujahid Tareen, Nasir Ismail, Muhammad Essa and Jaffar Khan, and coaches such as Tariq Lutfi and Akhtar Mohiuddin, also criticised the inclusion of overseas players several times.

The inclusion of Serbian coach Zaviša Milosavljević brought Norway born Omar Malik and Denmark based Hassan Bashir, Yousuf Butt and Mohammad Ali for a friendly against Singapore in 2012. The next year, Yousuf's brother Yaqoob Butt also joined the squad. The appointment of Bahraini coach Mohammad Al-Shamlan was again marred by controversies as he constantly sidelined overseas players in important competitions in hope to develop local talent. However, a notable inclusion was of professional footballer Nabil Aslam in 2015 who was scouted several times previously. After a long period of inactivity due to ban on the Pakistan Football Federation by FIFA, Adnan Mohammad and Navid Rahman were recruited, followed by Rahis Nabi and Samir Nabi. After another ban and period of inactivity, the team received another influx of overseas players in 2022 and 2023 to compensate for the inactivity of the domestic setup for years. However, the action was again denounced by previous critics.

== List of players ==
This is a list of football players who represented the Pakistan national football team in international football and were born outside Pakistan.

The following players:

1. have played at least one game for the full (senior male) Pakistan national team; and
2. were born outside Pakistan.

This list includes players who have dual citizenship with Pakistan and/or have become naturalised Pakistani citizens. The players are ordered per the year of debut.

As of 29 September 2026

List of players
Country of birth	Player	Period	Caps	Goals
England	Jimmy Khan	1989	1	0
England	Usman Gondal	2005–2006	2	0
England	Zesh Rehman	2005–2019	22	1
England	Adnan Ahmed	2007–2013	27	4
England	Amjad Iqbal	2007–2009	5	0
England	Iltaf Ahmed	2007–2008	4	0
Germany	Atif Bashir	2008–2011	17	2
England	Kashif Siddiqi	2008	1	0
England	Reis Ashraf	2009	3	1
England	Shabir Khan	2009–2013	8	1
Australia	Ahmad Akbar Khan	2011	2	0
Norway	Omar Malik	2012	1	0
Denmark	Hassan Bashir	2012–2023	29	9
Denmark	Yousuf Butt	2012–present	35	0
Denmark	Mohammad Ali	2012–2019	16	1
Denmark	Yaqoob Butt	2013–2019	10	0
Denmark	Nabil Aslam	2015	1	0
Denmark	Adnan Mohammad	2018–2023	9	0
Canada	Navid Rahman	2018–2019	2	0
England	Rahis Nabi	2019–present	19	1
England	Samir Nabi	2019	2	0
Denmark	Abdullah Iqbal	2022–present	23	0
England	Harun Hamid	2023–present	18	4
England	Imran Kayani	2023–present	7	0
England	Otis Khan	2023–present	15	0
England	Easah Suliman	2023–present	12	0
Denmark	Abdul Arshad	2023–present	16	2
Denmark	Mohammad Fazal	2024–present	11	0
England	McKeal Abdullah	2024–present	6	0
Denmark	Ali Haider Shah	2025–present	2	0
Norway	Etzaz Hussain	2025	3	1
New Zealand	Haris Zeb	2025–present	8	0
England	Adam Khan	2025–present	1	0
England	Adil Nabi	2026–present	3	0
Sweden	Ali Khan	2026–present	2	1

== List of countries ==
List of countries
Country of birth	Total
Australia	1
Canada	1
Denmark	10
England	18
Germany	1
New Zealand	1
Norway	2
Sweden	1

== See also ==
- List of Pakistan international footballers
- List of Pakistan women's international footballers
