= British Asians in association football =

British Asians in association football include British citizens with heritage or joint nationality of any Asian country; there is a long history of British Asian football players in England particularly, dating back to the Victorian era, albeit in low numbers. In modern times the proportionately low number of British Asians in association football has received significant media attention, and has seen some clubs announce plans to explicitly target young British Asian players. Prominent British Asian players have included Frank Soo, Neil Taylor, Zesh Rehman, Jimmy Carter and Michael Chopra.

In October 2017 the BBC reported that out of 3,000 professional footballers in England, only 10 were British Asian. In 2019, academic Daniel Kilvington suggested a figure of 10 British Asians out of a total of 4,000 professional players in the English game. By contrast, at the time of the 2011 census around 7.5% of the population of England was of Asian descent – a ratio of footballers mirroring this would be 300 out of the 4,000.

== History ==
=== Players ===
==== Early players ====
The earliest documented British Asian players were the Cother brothers who appeared for Watford in the late 1890s, their father was an Indian man from Mumbai. Later in the 20th century the British Chinese players Frank Soo and Sammy Chung had prominent careers. Soo became the first ethnic minority player to represent England, albeit in Victory International matches that were not included on full senior records; he went on to have a long coaching career, particularly in Sweden where he won the Allsvenskan with Djurgårdens IF in 1955. Chung played over 200 league matches for Watford and went on to manage Wolverhampton Wanderers in the 1970s and Doncaster Rovers in the 1990s.

Roger Verdi, of Indian origin, decided to change his name because of racism, and had to move to the United States to start a professional career in 1972.

==== Premier League ====
Robert Rosario became the first British Asian to play in the Premier League, when he started for Coventry City against Middlesbrough on 15 August 1992. Jimmy Carter, who had played in the Premiership in 1991, also had Indian heritage and became the second British Asian to play in that league, when he played against Blackburn Rovers three days later on 18 August 1992. However he did not disclose his heritage, and until he did so, Zesh Rehman, of Pakistani origin, and Michael Chopra of Indian origin, were both claimed to be the first British Asians to play in the Premiership, in 2003 and 2004, respectively. Rehman later launched his own Foundation in May 2010, with the intention of helping young British Asians in football.

==== Modern club football ====
A Commission for Racial Equality survey in 2004 found only seven professional British Asian footballers playing in the UK; the same survey also found only ten British Asian players at Premier League academies. By February 2008 the number of professionals had dropped to just five, and less than 1 in 100 of young players in Academies throughout the entire English football league system were Asian. Professionals, such as Adnan Ahmed, publicly spoke out about the lack of fellow Asians in the sport at this time.

Anwar Uddin, of Bangladeshi origin, was the first British South Asian to captain a side in any of the top four divisions of English League football.

In October 2013 the Football Association announced plans to encourage an increase in British Asian players and coaches.

In December 2015, Yan Dhanda, of Indian heritage, signed a two-and-a-half-year deal with Liverpool.

Easah Suliman, of Pakistani descent, became the first player of Asian heritage to captain an England football side in official matches, having done so at Under-16, Under-17 and Under-19 levels, Suliman played every game at centre back in the England Under-19s victorious UEFA European Under-19 Championship campaign in July 2017, scoring the opening goal in England's 2–1 final victory over Portugal.

On 28 November 2017, Hamza Choudhury made his Premier League debut for Leicester coming on as substitute in the 83rd minute of a home win against Tottenham Hotspur. He is the first player of Bangladeshi descent to have played in the Premier League, as well as the only Bangladeshi to currently play in the Premier League.

In February 2019, Adil Nabi said that he wanted to be an inspiration to other British Asian footballers, in the same way that Cyrille Regis and Laurie Cunningham had done for black players.

In October 2019 there were "just 12 players of South Asian heritage across the Premier League and the English Football League".

On 29 October 2020, Hamza Choudhury scored a 39th-minute volley against AEK Athens in the UEFA Europa League, becoming the first British Asian footballer to score in the Europa League.

In December 2021, Shadab Iftikhar became the first British Asian to be a senior manager in Scotland when he took charge of Fort William.

On 8 December 2021, Zidane Iqbal came on as an 89th-minute substitute in Manchester United's final UEFA Champions League group stage match against BSC Young Boys to become the first ever British Asian footballer to play in a Champions League finals match, being of Pakistani and Iraqi descent.

In June 2022, Mal Benning spoke out about being a role model for South Asian players.

On 1 November 2023, Elkan Baggott scored his first goal for the Blues against Fulham in a 1–3 defeat in the fourth round of the EFL Cup, making him the first Indonesian to score a goal in the competition.

In November 2023 it was announced that the number of South Asian professional players in English football had risen for a second year in a row. In March 2023 they made up 0.45% of the 5,000 professional players.

As of March 2026, "despite being the largest ethnic minority group in England, South Asians make up less than once percent of women in elite football".

==== International football ====
Correct as of 2022, Paul Wilson, Ricky Hill and Neil Taylor are the only three British Asian men's footballers to have won full senior international caps for one of the home nations. Wilson was the first British South Asian to represent any of the home nations when he made his senior international debut for Scotland in his only appearance in 1975. Hill was the first British South Asian to represent England at the senior level, making 3 appearances for England between his debut in 1982 and his last match in 1986. Taylor made 43 appearances for Wales between his debut in 2010 and last match in 2019. He also represented Great Britain at the 2012 Summer Olympics.

In 2023, Safia Middleton-Patel made her senior international debut for Wales, becoming the first women's footballer to be capped for one of the home nations.

Frank Soo, of Chinese heritage, played for the England wartime team and remains the only player of East Asian heritage to do so.

In August 2007, trials were organised by the Pakistan Football Federation in Rotherham, South Yorkshire for British Pakistanis players to attend a training camp with the Pakistan national team.

=== Coaches ===
In August 2025, Ashvir Singh Johal became the first Sikh manager of a professional club, after being appointed at Morecambe.

=== Clubs ===
There are a number of Asian-specific football teams such as London APSA, Sporting Khalsa and Sporting Bengal United, who became the first Asian clubs to play in the FA Cup in 2005.

In October 2007, clubs in the Football League began out-reach programmes into Asian communities to attract new fans.

In March 2009, Premier League club Chelsea announced plans to target young players from Asian communities. Two players found on the trial later signed with Southend United and Leyton Orient, and in May 2010 Chelsea launched a second initiative, with the aim to find six young British Asian players.

In August 2025, the British Sikh business group 'Punjab Warriors' bought Morecambe.

=== Fans ===
In December 1999, a Scottish Asian football fan publicly spoke out about the racism he had encountered at Rangers.

Research compiled by the Premier League in March 2009 concluded that more British Asians were attending games than ever before. However, research in 2013 by the BBC found that only 1% of fans of teams in the North West of England are Asian, despite making up 20% of the population of some areas.

Bradford City has a British Asian fan group called the 'Baji Bantams', who have won awards for their work in the community.

=== Officials ===
Jarnail Singh, who is of Indian descent, has been described as a "trailblazer" for Asian referees.

In January 2023, Bhupinder Singh Gill became the first Sikh-Punjabi to serve as a Premier League assistant referee. In March 2024 his brother Sunny Singh Gill became the first British South Asian referee in the Premier League. Their father Jarnail Singh had been a referee in the English Football League from 2004 to 2010.

=== The Asian Football Awards ===
Launched to recognise the outstanding contribution to both the professional game and grass roots initiatives by individuals and groups across the UK with South Asian heritage, the awards focus on the positive efforts made in the football industry.

=== Organisations ===
The Football Association has held meetings on the matter of British Asians in association football, and they launched a campaign in 2013 to increase British Asians in football, though in March 2014 it announced plans to increase the number of British Asians in football would be delayed. FA chairman Greg Dyke admitted in December 2014 that attempts to increase Asian participation in the sport had failed.

In January 2012 the inaugural Asian Football Awards were held.

=== Racism ===
In April 2019 British Asian footballers spoke out about the racist abuse they had encountered. In August 2019 Yan Dhanda said that the racism he has encountered as a British Asian footballer inspires him to play his best.

In March 2024, British Asian football fans spoke out about the racism they experience on social media.

== List of British Asian footballers ==
The following is a list of notable British Asian footballers – those who have participated at professional or international level – organised by ethnic heritage.

Name	Heritage	Debut	International details	Notes & references
Husin, Noor	Afghanistan	2016	Full caps for Afghanistan	
Kouhyar, Maziar	Afghanistan	2016	Full caps for Afghanistan	
Ahmed, Shahed	Bangladesh	2004		
Choudhury, Hamza	Bangladesh	2015	Youth caps for England; full caps for Bangladesh.	
Hok, Kasper	Bangladesh	2025		
Khan, Mahe	Bangladesh	2026		
Mitchell, Cuba	Bangladesh	2025		
Salik, Tanil	Bangladesh	2026		
Uddin, Anwar	Bangladesh	2002		
Walid, Farhaan Ali	Bangladesh	2026		
Yousuf, Zidane	Bangladesh	2026		
Yoganathan, Vimal	Sri Lanka	2023	First footballer of Tamil heritage to play in the UK	
Chung, Sammy	Republic of China	1951		
Soo, Frank	Republic of China	1933	Full caps for the England wartime and Victory International sides during and shortly after World War II. The first player of East Asian descent to play for any England side.	
Jack Cother	India	1897	Played for Watford and Watford St. Mary's in the Victorian era with his brother Edwin. Jack also went by the name John. Their father was an Indian man from Mumbai.	
Edwin Cother	India	1898	Played for Watford and Watford St. Mary's in the Victorian era with his brother Jack. Their father was an Indian man from Mumbai.	
Heppolette, Ricky	India	1967		
Bains, Rikki	India	2006		
Batth, Danny	India	2009		
Benning, Mal	India	2012		
Carter, Jimmy	India	1987		Second Asian to play in the Premier League, but did not disclose his background at the time.
Chopra, Michael	India	2000	Youth caps for England	In August 2014 Chopra stated that he wanted to play for India at international level.
Dhanda, Yan	India	2018	Youth caps for England	
Dosanj, Aman	India	1999	Youth caps for England Women	First British Asian to represent England Women in official matches at any level.
Hill, Ricky	India	1976	Full caps for England	First British South Asian to represent England at senior level
Jhooti, Permi	India	1997		
Juttla, Jazz	India	1997		
Khela, Brandon	India	2023		
Luthra, Rohan	India	2023		First goalkeeper of South Asian descent to play in the EFL Championship
Markanday, Dilan	India	2022		
Middleton-Patel, Safia	India	2023	Youth and full caps for Wales, first female player of Asian heritage to play for Wales at a major tournament	
Rosario, Robert	India	1983	Youth caps for England	First Asian to play in the Premier League
Sansara, Netan	India	2008	Youth caps for England	
Sekhon, Aaron	India	2011		
Singh, Harpal	India	2001		
Taylor, Neil	India	2007	Full caps for Wales	
Verdi, Roger	India	1972		
Verma, Aman	India	2009		
Williams, Rhys	India	2008	Full caps for Australia	Born in Australia to a British father and an Indian mother
Williams, Ryan	India	2011	Australia U-20 caps	Born in Australia to a British father and an Indian Mother
Wilson, Paul	India	1967	Full caps for Scotland	First British South Asian to represent any of the home nations at senior level
Baggott, Elkan	Indonesia	2022	Youth and Full caps for Indonesia	First Indonesian player to play in an English professional league.
Beattie, Callum	Hong Kong	2018	Full caps for Hong Kong	Born in Hong Kong to a British patients
Nuñez, Vas	Hong Kong	2015	Full caps for Hong Kong	Born in Hong Kong to a British father and an Mexican Mother
McKee, Jaimes	Hong Kong	2005	Full caps for Hong Kong	He was born in England to a British family and moved to Hong Kong at the age of ten.
Nasseri, Navid	Iran	2018		
Samizadeh, Alex	Iran	2016		
Walker, Dennis	Iran	1961		The first black footballer to make a senior appearance for Manchester United.
Iqbal, Zidane	Iraq, Pakistan	2021	Full caps for Iraq	The first British-born South Asian footballer to make a senior appearance for Manchester United
Kasim, Yaser	Iraq	2010	Full caps for Iraq	
Al-Hamadi, Ali	Iraq	2021	Full caps for Iraq	
Jalal, Shwan	Iraq	2000	Full caps for England C	
Robinson, Josh	Malaysia	2024	England U-18 caps	Born in England to a Jamaican father and an British-Malaysian Mother
Chin, Richard	Malaysia	2021	Full caps for Malaysia	Born in England to a Malaysian Chinese father and an Seychellois Mother
Wan, Hong	Malaysia, Republic of China	2019	Full caps for Malaysia	Born in England to a British-Chinese father and an Malaysian Mother
Ale, Asmita	Nepal	2018	First Nepalese-heritage professional in the English system. Youth caps for England Women up to U-19 level	
Rai, Kiban	Nepal	2023		First male Nepalese-heritage professional in the English system
Abdullah, Mckeal	Pakistan	2023	Full caps for Pakistan	
Ahmed, Adnan	Pakistan	2004	Full caps for Pakistan	
Asghar, Adam	Pakistan	2013		
Ashraf, Reis	Pakistan	2009	Full caps for Pakistan	
Bashir, Atif	Pakistan	2004	Full caps for Pakistan	Born in Germany to a British Asian father and a German Turkish mother.
Docker, Adam	Pakistan	2007	Full caps for Pakistan	
Gondal, Usman	Pakistan	2006	Full caps for Pakistan	
Hamid, Harun	Pakistan	2023	Full caps for Pakistan	
Iqbal, Amjad	Pakistan	2007	Full caps for Pakistan	
Kayani, Imran	Pakistan	2020	Full caps for Pakistan	
Khan, Jimmy	Pakistan	1989	Full caps for Pakistan	First overseas player to be called up to play for the Pakistan national football team.
Khan, Otis	Pakistan	2013	Full caps for Pakistan	
Khan, Sabhir	Pakistan	2009	Full caps for Pakistan	
Nabi, Adil	Pakistan	2013	Youth caps for England; full caps for Pakistan	
Nabi, Rahis	Pakistan	2018	Youth caps for England; full caps for Pakistan	
Nabi, Samir	Pakistan	2016	Full caps for Pakistan	
Rehman, Zesh	Pakistan	2003	Youth caps for England; full caps for Pakistan	
Sarwar, Rashid	Pakistan	1985		
Siddiqi, Kashif	Pakistan	2005	Full caps for Pakistan	
Suliman, Easah	Pakistan	2015	Youth caps for England; full caps for Pakistan	First player of Pakistani heritage to captain an England side.
Etheridge, Neil	Philippines	2008	Full caps for Philippines	
Hartmann, Mark	Philippines	2011	Full caps for Philippines	
Hartmann, Matthew	Philippines	2006	Full caps for Philippines	
Gier, Rob	Philippines	2000	Full caps for Philippines	
Gould, Chad	Philippines	2004	Full caps for Philippines	
Greatwich, Christopher	Philippines	2004	Full caps for Philippines	
Greatwich, Phil	Philippines	2006	Full caps for Philippines	
Greatwich, Simon	Philippines	2008	Full caps for Philippines	
Younghusband, James	Philippines	2006	Full caps for Philippines	
Younghusband, Phil	Philippines	2006	Full caps for Philippines	
Ali, Mukhtar	Saudi Arabia	2017	Full caps for Saudi Arabia	
Ng, Perry	Singapore	2014		
Chow, Tim	Taiwan	2015	Capped at senior level for Chinese Taipei, the name for Taiwan in international sport	
Chunonsee, Mika	Thailand	2007	Youth caps for Wales; full caps for Thailand	
Ramasut, Tom	Thailand	1996	Youth caps for Wales	
Waite, Jamie	Thailand	2004	Full caps for Thailand	
Mohamed, Kaid	Yemen	2003		

== In popular culture ==
The 2002 film Bend It Like Beckham deals with issues relating to British Asians in football.

== See also ==
- List of Sikh footballers
- Islam in association football
