= Ahmad Akbar Khan =

Australian-born Pakistani footballer

Personal information
- Full name: Ahmad Akbar Khan
- Date of birth: October 12, 1983 (age 43)
- Place of birth: Penrith, New South Wales, Australia
- Position: Winger

Senior career*
Years	Team	Apps	(Gls)
??–2010	Fairfield Bulls		
2011–2013	Hills Brumbies		
2013–2016	Pakistan Air Force		

International career
2011	Pakistan	2	(0)
- * Club domestic league appearances and goals

Ahmad Akbar Khan (born 12 October 1984) is a former footballer who played as a winger. Born in Australia, he represented the Pakistan national team.

== Club career ==
Khan played for the Australian clubs Fairfield Bulls and Hills Brumbies until joining Pakistan Air Force in the Pakistan Premier League in 2013. He won 2014 edition of National Football Challenge Cup with the club.

== International career ==
Khan met Pakistani national team coach Tariq Lutfi at Singapore airport where he got chance to talk with him and later on got a call up to Pakistan under-23 team camp for the Palestine games in 2011.

Khan went on to pick up his first senior cap during the 2014 FIFA World Cup qualifications against Bangladesh in Dhaka, coming on as an 83rd-minute substitute.

== Career statistics ==
=== International ===
Appearances and goals by year and competition
National team	Year	Apps	Goals
Pakistan	2011	2	0
Total		2	0

== See also ==
- List of Pakistan international footballers born outside Pakistan

== Honours ==
Pakistan Air Force

- National Football Challenge Cup: 2014
