= Usman Gondal =

Pakistani footballer

Personal information
- Full name: Usman Iqbal Gondal
- Date of birth: 12 February 1987 (age 39)
- Place of birth: Derby, England
- Position: Midfielder

Youth career
- 2001–2003: Nottingham Forest
- 2003–2005: Leicester City

Senior career*
Years	Team	Apps	(Gls)
2005–2006	Leicester City		
2006–2007	Arnold Town		

International career
2005–2006	Pakistan	2	(0)
- * Club domestic league appearances and goals

Usman Iqbal Gondal (Urdu: عثمان اقبال گوندل; born 12 February 1987) is a former professional footballer who played as a midfielder. Born in England, he played for the Pakistan national team.

== Club career ==
Gondal was born in Derby, England, and played youth football for both Nottingham Forest and Leicester City. In 2003, Usman Gondal became Leicester City's first Asian scholar and played for the under-17s. Gondal was called up by the senior team after he scored in a trial match for their under-19 side against Watford in 2005.

Gondal signed for non-league side Arnold Town in September 2006. Gondal retired from professional football in 2007, because of persisting injuries that hampered his football career and focused on his job career.

== International career ==
Gondal made his debut international appearance for Pakistan as substitute in the first match of the friendly series against India in Quetta on 12 June 2005. He then had to leave the camp before the second match of the series after falling ill.

In 2006, he was included with the squad for the tour to Bahrain and the 2007 AFC Asian Cup qualifiers against Jordan.

== See also ==
- List of Pakistan international footballers born outside Pakistan
- British Asians in association football
