= Yousuf Butt =

Pakistani footballer (born 1989)

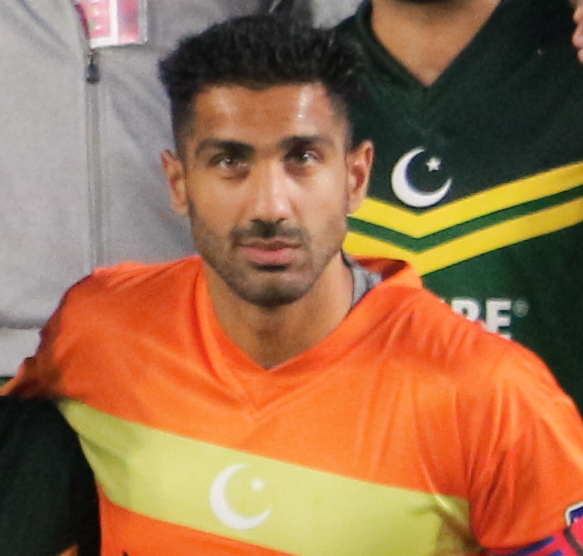
- Butt in 2019

Personal information
- Full name: Yousuf Ijaz Butt
- Date of birth: 18 October 1989 (age 37)
- Place of birth: Vanløse, Denmark
- Height: 1.88 m (6 ft 2 in)
- Position: Goalkeeper

Team information
- Current team: Ishøj IF
- Number: 25

Youth career
- 2004–2007: HIK

Senior career*
Years	Team	Apps	(Gls)
2007–2010	HIK	48	(0)
2010	BK Skjold	17	(0)
2010–2013	BGA	92	(0)
2014–2015	Brønshøj BK	1	(0)
2015–2016	Svebølle BI	28	(0)
2016–2017	Brønshøj BK	12	(0)
2017	Fredensborg BI	16	(0)
2017–2018	Herlev IF	18	(0)
2018	Greve	7	(0)
2018–2021	AB Tårnby	81	(0)
2021–2024	Ishøj IF	89	(0)
2024–2025	Tårnby FF	10	(0)
2025	Karlslunde IF	19	(0)
2025–2026	Gentofte-VI	15	(0)
2026	Stallion Laguna	16	(0)
2026–	Ishøj IF	2	(0)

International career^{‡}
2011	Pakistan U23	1	(0)
2012–	Pakistan	36	(0)
- * Club domestic league appearances and goals as of 4 October 2026 ‡ National team caps and goals as of 23:00, 2 October 2026 (UTC)

Yousuf Ijaz Butt (Urdu: يوسف اعجاز بٹ; born 18 October 1989) is a professional footballer who plays as a goalkeeper for Danish 2nd Division club Ishøj. Born in Denmark, he plays for the Pakistan national team.

Butt has played over 300 games in the Danish football league system, and is considered one of the most prominent Pakistani goalkeepers.

== Club career ==
=== Early career ===
Butt started his career at Hellerup IK joining the club at the age of 14. He made his senior debut in 2007 in the Danish 1st division at the age of 18.

Afterwards, Butt joined the 2nd division club BK Skjold in 2010, helping the club avoid relegation, playing 17 games in the season. He played for Skjold Birkerød the following season.

Butt was then brought into the 2nd division side BK Glostrup Albertslund where he eventually became the club captain.

=== Domestic career ===
In August 2014, Butt signed with the 1st division club Brønshøj Boldklub on a 6-month contract. He played one match for the club in the DBU Cup, winning 9–1 away against Blovstrød. Butt later moved to the 2nd division club Svebølle B&I in 2015.

Butt returned again to his former club Brønshøj the next season. In 2017 after a short stint at Fredensborg BI, Butt signed for Herlev IF.

In 2018, Butt moved to Greve Fodbold, where he was joined by national team fellow Muhammad Ali. In 2018, Butt moved to AB Tårnby with fellow national team striker Hassan Bashir.

Butt moved to the Denmark Series club Ishøj IF in 2021. He played for Ishøj as a key player and was promoted with the club to the Danish 3rd Division in the same season. In January 2024, Ishøj announced the departure of eight players including Butt.

Following his departure, Butt moved to the Denmark Series club Tårnby FF in the summer of 2024. In the winter window of 2025, Butt moved to the Denmark Series club Karlslunde. On 6 August 2025, Butt signed for Gentofte-VI which competed in the Denmark Series.

=== Overseas spell and return ===
In January 2026, Butt joined the Philippines Football League side Stallion Laguna. In July 2026, Butt returned to Danish 2nd Division side Ishøj.

== International career ==
=== Youth ===
Butt was first called up to represent the Pakistan national under-23 team in January 2011 for the 2012 Summer Olympics qualifiers under Tariq Lutfi. He had previously been called up for the 2010 Asian Games, but was stopped by the Pakistan Football Federation due to alleged late document submission to the Pakistan Olympic Association. He had bought a non-refundable air ticket and received no compensation from the PFF.

He made his debut in the Olympic qualifiers as a starter against Malaysia, losing the match 0–2, conceding both goals in the first half, and eventually being replaced by Muhammad Omar in the second half.

=== Senior ===
Butt made his senior debut for the national team in November 2012 against Singapore, as a replacement in the second half for the captain Jaffar Khan, who conceded two of the goals in the eventual 0–4 defeat.

He played as the main goalkeeper for Pakistan including in the AFC Challenge Cup qualifiers of 2014, the 2013 SAFF Championship, as well as in the 2013 Philippine Peace Cup.

After being left out of the squad for both the 2014 Asian Games and the 2018 FIFA World Cup's Asian qualifiers 1st round of March 2015, Butt returned after almost 5 years away to be the starting goalkeeper in the 2018 SAFF Championship, where he made the most saves till the semi-finals, earning the sobriquet "Safe Hands".

He was also called for the Panjab football team in the 2018 CONIFA World Football Cup, where he made 2 appearances.

After years of inactivity due to the ban on Pakistan Football Federation by FIFA, Butt earned his first cap as captain of the national team in the opening match against Mauritius at the 2023 Mauritius Four Nations Cup. On 17 October 2023, Butt captained Pakistan in his home debut with the national team in Islamabad after 11 years, in a 1–0 win against Cambodia in the second leg of the first round of the 2026 FIFA World Cup qualification, to be Pakistan's first ever victory in a World Cup qualifying match, which sent them through to the second round by winning 1–0 on aggregate.

== Personal life ==
Butt was born in Denmark to a Kashmiri family of Punjab from Lahore. He also holds Canadian citizenship due to his father, who moved to Canada at a young age before shifting to Denmark. Yousuf is the younger brother of Yaqoob Butt, who has also represented Pakistan at the international level. Butt also went to school with Hassan Bashir in Denmark, who eventually played alongside him in the national team.

== Career statistics ==
=== International ===
As of 2 October 2026

Appearances and goals by national team and year
National team	Year	Apps	Goals
Pakistan	2012	1	0
Pakistan	2013	7	0
Pakistan	2018	5	0
Pakistan	2019	2	0
Pakistan	2022	1	0
Pakistan	2023	9	0
Pakistan	2024	4	0
Pakistan	2025	2	0
Pakistan	2026	5	0
Total		36	0

== Honours ==
Pakistan

- Diamond Jubilee International Football Tournament: 2026

== See also ==
- List of Pakistan national football team captains
- List of Pakistan international footballers born outside Pakistan
