= Omar Malik =

Norwegian-Pakistani footballer

Personal information
- Full name: Omar Malik
- Date of birth: 9 April 1992 (age 34)
- Place of birth: Norway
- Position: Defender

Youth career
- 1998–2008: Heming, Nøtterøy IF, FK Tønsberg

Senior career*
Years	Team	Apps	(Gls)
2009–2012	FK Tønsberg	24	(1)
2014	Eik-Tønsberg	3	(1)

International career^{‡}
2012	Pakistan	1	(0)
- * Club domestic league appearances and goals as of 14 June 2016 ‡ National team caps and goals as of 14 June 2016

Omar Malik (born 9 April 1992) is a former footballer who played as a defender. Born in Norway, he played for the Pakistan national team.

== Club career ==
Malik was selected for the FK Tønsberg first team as a 15-year-old.

== International career ==
He was selected for the Pakistan national football team in 2012, and played in the friendly match against Singapore, picking up his first international cap in the process.

== See also ==
- List of Pakistan international footballers born outside Pakistan
