= Denmark–Pakistan relations =

- Pakistan: Denmark

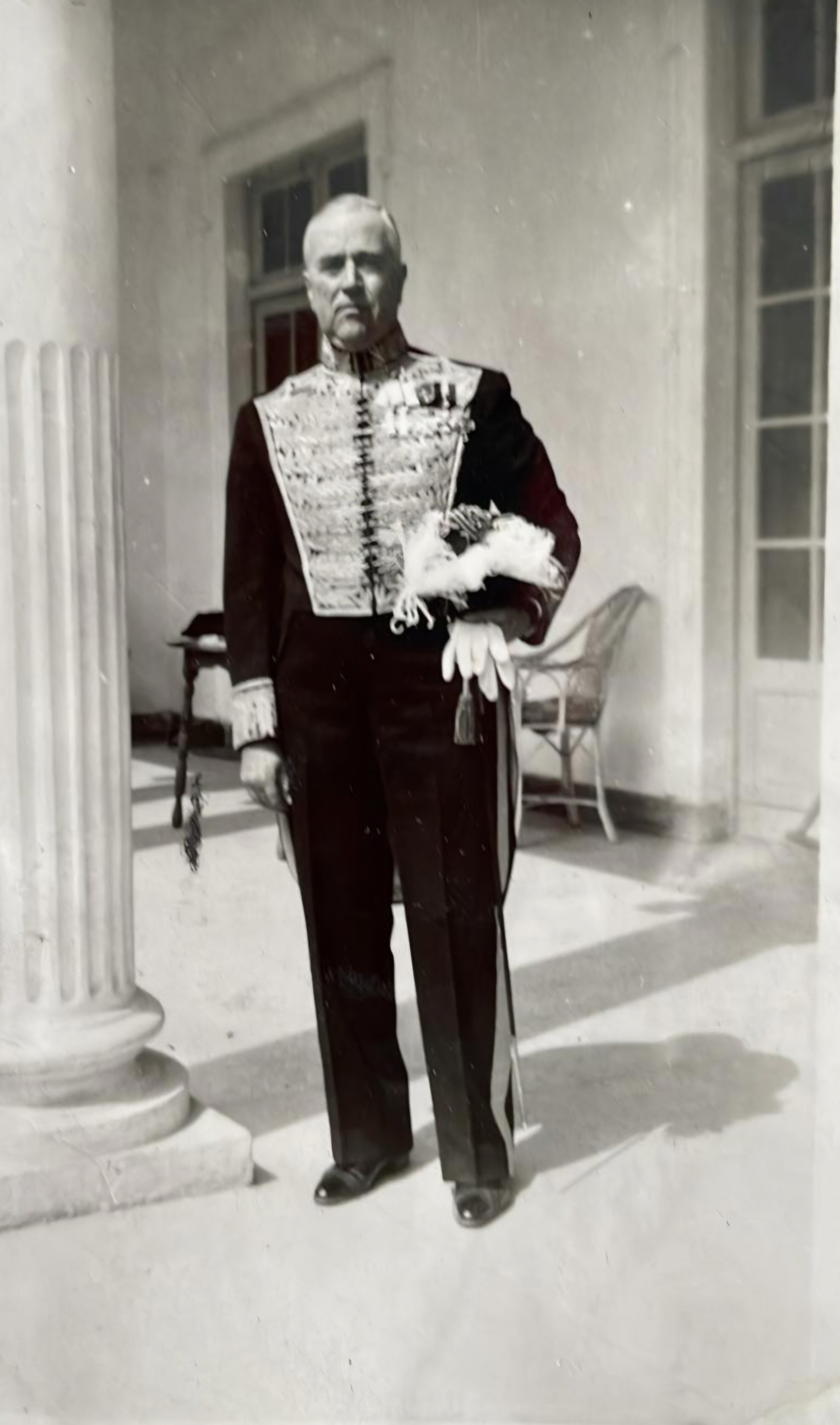
Axel Caspar Frederik Sporon-Fidler was the first Danish Representative accredited to Pakistan.

Denmark and Pakistan established diplomatic relations in October 1949. Since then, the relationship has developed to include diplomatic engagements, trade, and cultural exchanges.

== Establishment of diplomatic relations ==
On October 13, 1949, Denmark accredited Axel Caspar Frederik Sporon-Fidler, its representative in Tehran, to Karachi, marking the initiation of formal diplomatic ties. The credentials were presented on November 3, 1949. Pakistan opened its ambassador-level resident Mission in Copenhagen in November 1976., and Denmark upgraded its Mission in Islamabad to Ambassador-level in September 2004.

== Diplomatic engagements and high-level visits ==
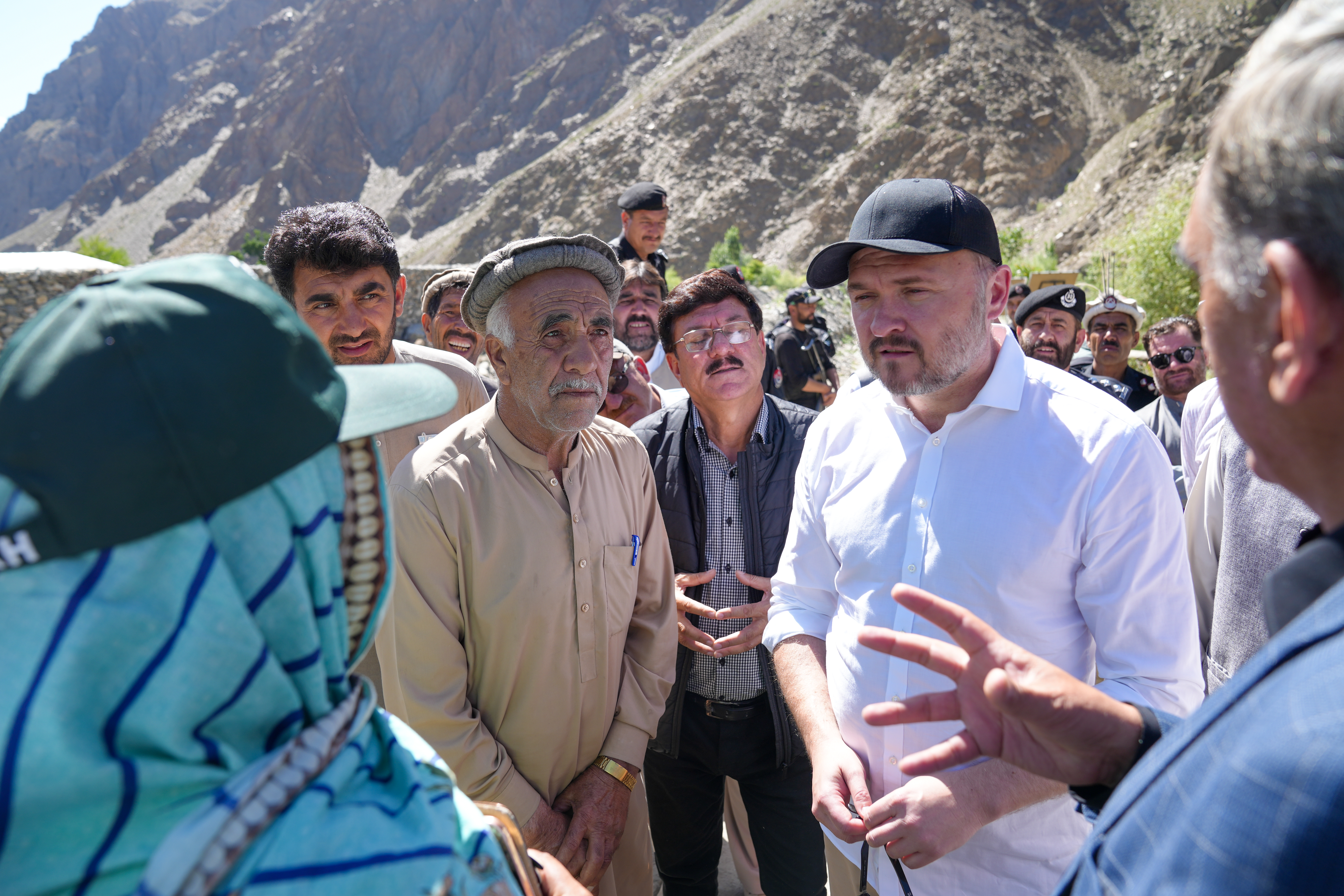
June 2023 - Danish Minister for Development Cooperation and Global Climate Policy on a visit to the northern areas of Pakistan.

Bilateral relations have been reinforced through official visits and discussions:

- October 1963 - Then-Princess Margrethe of Denmark visited Pakistan and was received by President Mohammed Ayub Khan.
- August 2019 - Telephone conversation between Makhdoom Shah Mahmood Qureshi, Foreign Minister of Pakistan and Jeppe Kofod, Foreign Minister of Denmark.
- July 2020 - Virtual meeting between Makhdoom Shah Mahmood Qureshi, Foreign Minister of Pakistan and Jeppe Kofod, Foreign Minister of Denmark.
- September 2021 - A telephonic discussion took place between Pakistan’s Foreign Minister Makhdoom Shah Mahmood Qureshi and Denmark’s Foreign Minister Jeppe Kofod.
- October 2021 - Danish Foreign Minister Jeppe Kofod visited Pakistan for bilateral discussions.
- June 2023 - Danish Minister for Development Cooperation and Global Climate Policy Dan Jørgensen, visited Pakistan to launch the Action Plan under the Green Framework Engagement agreement.
- November 2024 - Prime Minister of Pakistan Muhammad Shehbaz Sharif, and the Prime Minister of Denmark Mette Frederiksen, held a bilateral meeting on the sidelines of the COP 29, Baku, Azerbaijan.
- March 2025 - Deputy Prime Minister and Foreign Minister of Pakistan, Senator Mohammad Ishaq Dar had a phone conversation with Foreign Minister of Denmark, Lars Løkke Rasmussen and discussed matters of mutual interest.

== Bilateral agreements ==
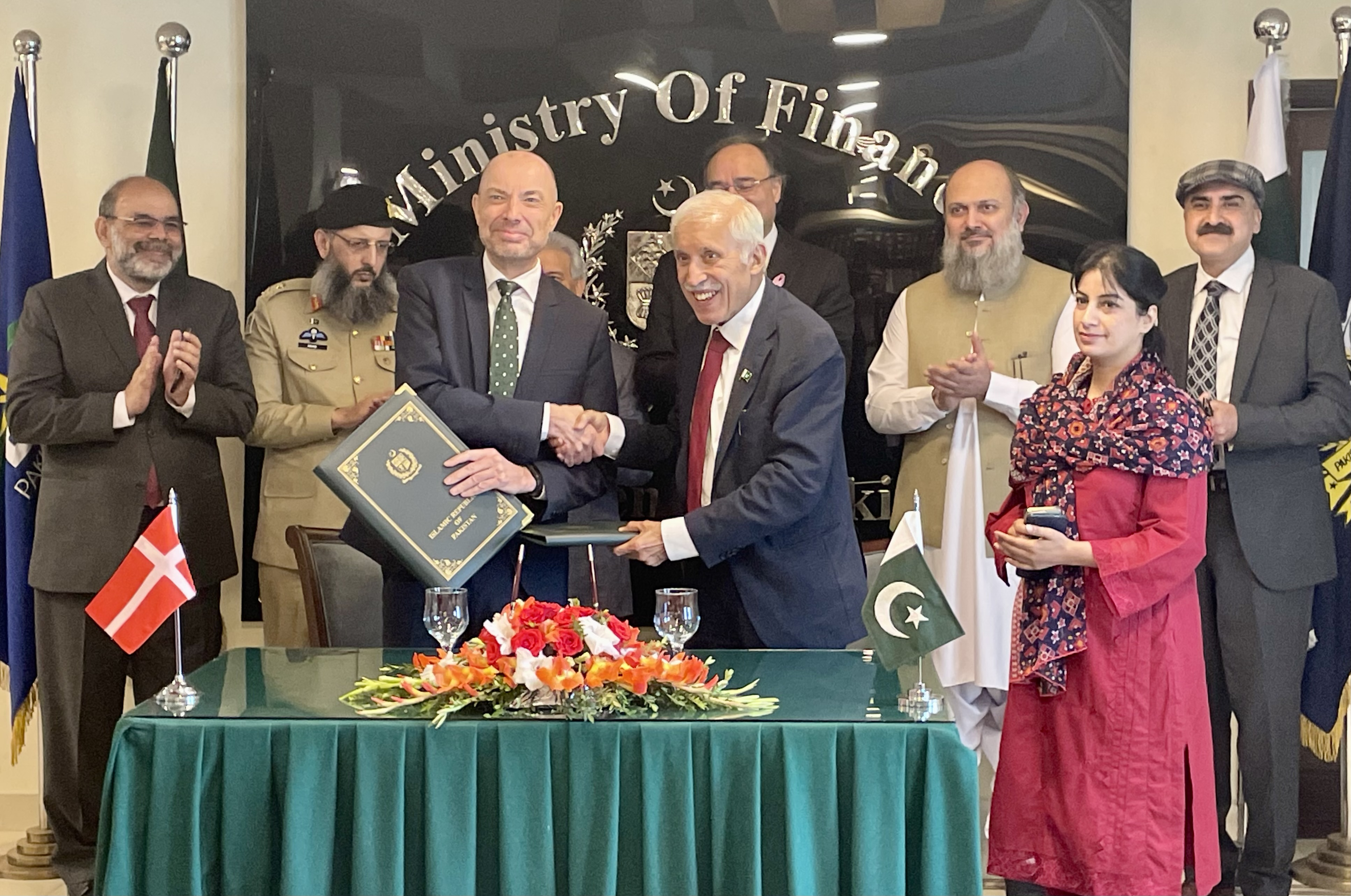
October 2024, Denmark and Pakistan sign Memorandum of Understanding to boost Public-Private Partnerships for Sustainable Infrastructure Projects.

Denmark and Pakistan have formalized cooperation through multiple agreements:

- Visa Abolition Agreement for Diplomatic and Official Passports (1954) - Facilitated easier travel for diplomatic and official personnel.
- Convention on Social Security (1982) - Provided social security benefits for nationals working in each other's countries.
- Agreement on Promotion and Protection of Investment (1996) - Encouraged and safeguarded bilateral investments.
- Agreement on Avoidance of Double Taxation (2002) - Prevented dual taxation for individuals and businesses.
- Memorandum of Understanding on Bilateral Political Consultations (2018) - Established a framework for regular dialogue.
- Danish Energy Transition Initiative (2021) - Facilitated knowledge exchange between Danish Energy Agency and Pakistani energy authorities.
- Green Framework Agreement (2022) - Supported Pakistan’s green transition and climate change mitigation efforts.
- Memorandum of Understanding on Public-Private Partnerships form Sustainable Infrastructure Projects – to boost trade partnerships between Denmark and Pakistan.

== Trade and economic relations ==
Over 50 Danish companies operate in Pakistan, contributing to diplomatic and economic ties. Key sectors include shipping, energy, environmental technology, and textiles. Prominent Danish companies such as Maersk and DSV provide shipping, while FLSmidth specializes in sustainable mining and cement production. Whereas, Danish pharmaceutical company Novo Nordisk supplies diabetes medication in Pakistan. Pakistan was Denmark's 61st largest export market in 2021, totalling exports of DKK 2.1 billion, which accounted for 0.1% of Danish exports.

Pakistan exports textiles, leather goods, sports equipment, surgical instruments, and agricultural products to Denmark. Imports of goods and services to Denmark from Pakistan totalled DKK 2.0 billion in 2021.

== Cultural and people-to-people connections ==
The estimated size of the Pakistani diaspora in Denmark is 30,000. Most Pakistanis arrived here in early 1970s as guest workers. Majority of early immigrants came from central and northern Punjab. Due to subsequent restrictions on immigration, the number of fresh arrivals from Pakistan went down considerably.

Later on, over 2,000 Pakistanis arrived in Denmark under the Green Card Scheme (Operational between 2008 and 2016) which offered immigration opportunities to the highly skilled and professional foreigners.

The Pakistani diaspora in Denmark comprises first, second and third generation of persons of Pakistani origin. The Pakistan diaspora contribute in all major professions in Denmark such as medical, legal, accounting, finance, engineering, IT and marketing etc. In particular, there are a large number of doctors and other medical professionals of Pakistani origin in Denmark.

The Pakistani diaspora is also active in local politics. There are several political and cultural organizations of local Pakistanis in Denmark that provide social service to the community. The diaspora is also active in supporting charitable causes in Pakistan.

The Pakistani diaspora also has a number of ethnic media outlets including radio stations, online papers and monthly journals.

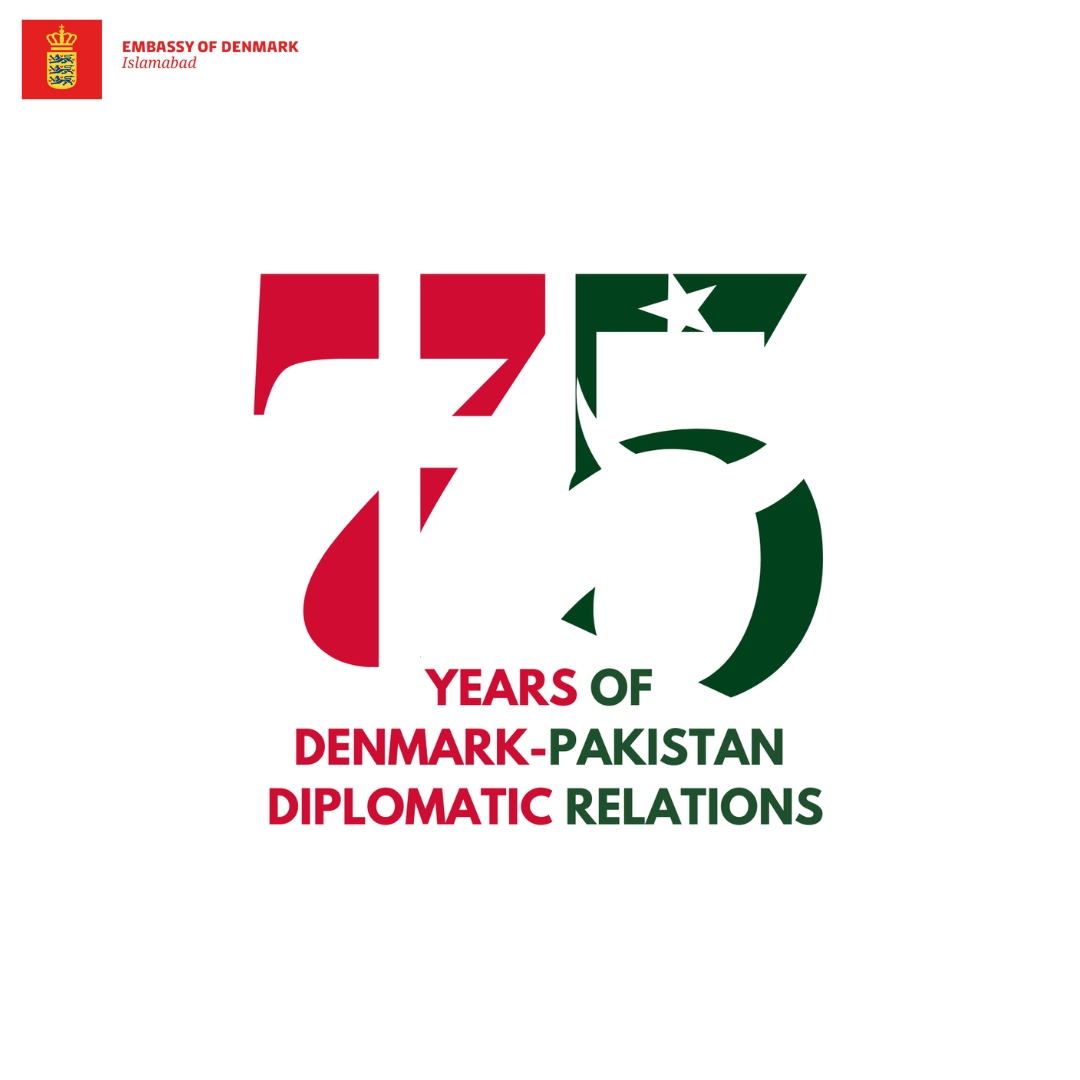
Logo commemorating 75 years of diplomatic relations between Denmark and Pakistan.

== Recent developments ==
In October 2024, Denmark and Pakistan commemorated 75 years of diplomatic relations. The Embassy of Denmark hosted an event under the theme "75 Years of Greener Together," highlighting collaboration in green energy, trade, and cultural engagement. Danish Ambassador Jakob Linulf hosted a high-level delegation from Denmark led by State Secretary for Foreign Policy Lisbet Zilmer-Jones, alongside key officials from Pakistan, including Federal Minister of Finance Muhammad Aurangzeb.

== See also ==
- Foreign relations of Denmark
- Foreign relations of Pakistan
- Pakistanis in Denmark
