= Jimmy Khan =

English-born Pakistani footballer

Personal information
- Full name: Jawad Akhtar Khan
- Date of birth: 22 September 1963 (age 63)
- Place of birth: Darwen, England
- Position: Winger

Youth career
- Darwen
- Blackburn Rovers
- Bury
1989–????	Darwen		
- Clitheroe

International career
Years	Team	Apps	(Gls)
1989	Pakistan	1	(0)

Jawad Akhtar "Jimmy" Khan (born 22 September 1963) s a former footballer who played as a winger. Khan is the first overseas player to be called up to play for the Pakistan national football team, where he made a single full appearance at the 1990 FIFA World Cup qualification in 1989 against the United Arab Emirates.

== Early life ==
Khan was born in Darwen, Lancashire in September 1963, two years after his parents moved from Pakistan to England.

== Club career ==
Khan started his youth career with Darwen F.C., and later was also part of the youth squad of Blackburn Rovers and Bury.

He later spent three seasons playing in the Finnish second division, from 1981 till 1984. After his international debut in 1989, Khan went on to play semiprofessional football for Darwen and Clitheroe in the North West Counties League.

== International career ==
Khan had visited Pakistan a couple of times, and during a holiday in 1987, he played some informal matches at an Army base against recruits of the Pakistan Army, scoring around ten goals in one game and four or five in another. After this experience, he returned to East Lancashire, where he began his journey as a sports development officer and set his sights on a career in coaching.

In January 1989, while Khan was unable to attend his brother's wedding in Rawalpindi, his family visited Pakistan, where news of Jimmy's footballing exploits began to circulate. Pakistan's German coach, Burkhard Ziese, was in search of new players in the Pakistan national team's first ever participation in the 1990 World Cup qualification . Upon learning that a player named Khan was in England, Khan's brother contacted him to inquire if he would like to attend the trials, which he accepted.

Khan performed well in a trial match, and although he was invited to participate in the first away games against Kuwait and the UAE, he was unwell with a cold and opted to stay in Islamabad to recover.

After joining the squad, Khan, the only player not born in Pakistan, expressed concern over the coaching methods employed by Ziese. Ziese was however dismissed the day before the match, and his assistant, Tariq Lutfi, was appointed as the new head coach.

"I remember the heat, struggling to acclimatise, and the whole training camp. We didn't do very much training at the time and I was already an FA Level 2 coach, so I would end up taking a lot of extra sessions where we would practise things like set-pieces. I remember the national anthem, but only moments during my debut because it went by so quickly. It was all so surreal and just a wild moment."

— Khan on his international debut during an interview with Sky Sports in May 2023.

On February 10, 1989, Khan was included in the starting lineup in front of a crowd of 40,000 at the Jinnah Stadium against the United Arab Emirates. Pakistan found themselves 0–3 down at halftime, eventually losing the match 1–4 and finishing bottom of their group without a victory.

Following the match, Khan was offered the opportunity to stay in Pakistan and play for the Pakistan International Airlines team in the local league, keeping him in contention for further international selection. However, he ultimately decided to return to England, citing the hot climate as the primary factor.

== Post-retirement ==
In 2014, Khan was reported as the head of sport and leisure at Preston City Council, and played veterans football for West Didsbury at the age of 51.

Khan later acquired a UEFA A coaching license, and was elected to the FA Council in 2021.

In August 2024, Khan was appointed as a member of the Football Association's National Game Board, becoming the first South Asian to assume the role.

== Personal life ==
Khan's family later shifted from Darwen to Manchester. After returning to England after his international debut with Pakistan, he then mostly played for semiprofessional clubs and campaigned while holding a full-time job due to economic constraints.

Jimmy is the father of Izac Khan, who has also played at the Manchester United, Manchester City, and Stoke City youth teams.

== Career statistics ==
=== International ===
Appearances and goals by national team and year
National team	Year	Apps	Goals
Pakistan	1989	1	0
Total		1	0

== See also ==
- British Asians in association football
- List of Pakistan international footballers born outside Pakistan

== Bibliography ==
- Bains, Jas; Johal, Sanjeev (1999). Corner Flags and Corner Shops The Asian Football Experience. United Kingdom: Orion Publishing Group. ISBN 9780753808528.
