= Shabir Khan =

British footballer

Personal information
- Full name: Shabir Khan
- Date of birth: 10 November 1985 (age 40)
- Place of birth: Worcester, England
- Position: Defender

Youth career
- 1998–2004: Worcester City

Senior career*
Years	Team	Apps	(Gls)
2004–2015	Worcester City	185	(4)
2006	→ Gloucester City (loan)	2	(0)
2011	→ Stourport Swifts (loan)		

International career
2009–2013	Pakistan	8	(1)
- * Club domestic league appearances and goals

Shabir Khan (born 10 November 1985) is a former footballer who played as a defender. Born in England, he represented the Pakistan national team.

Khan spent his entire career at Worcester, having progressed through their youth system. He joined Gloucester City on a one-month loan deal in December 2006 and Stourport Swifts on loan in September 2011. He made his international debut for Pakistan in 2010.

== Club career ==
Born to a Pakistani father and an English mother in Worcester, England, Khan came up through the youth system at Worcester City, and broke into the first team in 2004, making his debut against Cambridge City in February that year. On 7 December 2006 he joined Gloucester City on loan. He made his debut for the Tigers on 9 December 2006 in a 2–0 defeat to Cheshunt.

In 2015, he was red carded while playing for Worcester City during a game against Stockport County when he performed a belly-to-belly suplex on Charlie Russell. He was however not fined or suspended for this incident.

== International career ==
Because his father was born in Pakistan, Shabir Khan is eligible to play for the Pakistan national team.

Khan was called up to represent Pakistan in the SAFF Cup 2009 in Bangladesh in December 2009, where he scored against Bhutan.

After a three-year hiatus, Khan returned to international action, taking part in friendlies against Singapore in November 2012 and later in February 2013 against Nepal and Maldives.

== Career statistics ==
=== International ===
Appearances and goals by national team and year
National team	Year	Apps	Goals
Pakistan	2009	4	1
Pakistan	2012	1	0
Pakistan	2013	3	0
Total		8	1

Scores and results list Pakistan's goal tally first, score column indicates score after each Khan goal.

List of international goals scored by Shabir Khan
No.	Date	Venue	Opponent	Score	Result	Competition
1	8 December 2009	Bangabandhu National Stadium, Dhaka, Bangladesh	Bhutan	5–0	7–0	2009 SAFF Championship

== Honours ==
Worcester City

- PASE Youth League Northern Division (1): 2003–04
- Worcestershire FA Youth Player of Season (1): 2003–04

== See also ==
- British Asians in association football
- List of Pakistan international footballers born outside Pakistan
