= Reis Ashraf =

English-born Pakistani international footballer

Personal information
- Date of birth: 18 September 1989 (age 37)
- Place of birth: Newport Pagnell, England
- Position: Striker

Youth career
- –2002: Newport Pagnell Town
- 2002–2008: Coventry City

Senior career*
Years	Team	Apps	(Gls)
2009	Leamington	1	(0)
2009–2010	Buckingham Town		
2011	Bedford Town		
2011–????	Olney Town		

International career
2009	Pakistan	3	(1)
- * Club domestic league appearances and goals

Reis Ashraf (Urdu: رئیس اشرف; born 18 September 1989) is a former footballer who played as a forward. Born in England, he played for the Pakistan national team.

== Club career ==
Ashraf was a junior at Newport Pagnell Town before joining Coventry City in 2002. He later played for Leamington and Olney Town.

== International career ==
Ashraf played for Pakistan in all three of his country's group matches against Bangladesh, Sri Lanka and Bhutan in the 2009 SAFF Championship in Bangladesh, scoring in the team's 7–0 victory over Bhutan.

== Personal life ==
Born in England, Reis is a cousin of former Wales international footballer Daniel Nardiello.

== Career statistics ==
=== International ===
Appearances and goals by year and competition
National team	Year	Apps	Goals
Pakistan	2009	3	1
Total		3	1

Scores and results list Pakistan's goal tally first, score column indicates score after each Ashraf goal.

List of international goals scored by Reis Ashraf
No.	Date	Venue	Opponent	Score	Result	Competition
1	8 December 2009	Bangabandhu National Stadium, Dhaka, Bangladesh	Bhutan	2–0	7–0	2009 SAFF Championship

== See also ==
- British Asians in association football
- List of Pakistan international footballers born outside Pakistan
