= Yaqoob Butt =

Pakistani footballer (born 1988)

Personal information
- Full name: Yaqoob Ijaz Butt
- Date of birth: 9 September 1988 (age 38)
- Place of birth: Herlev, Denmark
- Height: 1.94 m (6 ft 4 in)
- Position: Centre-back

Youth career
- 2003–2007: Stenløse

Senior career*
Years	Team	Apps	(Gls)
2009–2011	Jægersborg BK		
2011–2013	Skovshoved		
2013–2014	BSF		
2014–2015	Vanløse		
2015–2016	Stenløse		
2016–2017	Avedøre		
2017–2018	KFUM Roskilde		
2018–2020	Tårnby FF		
2021	Køge Nord	3	(0)
2021–2022	Avarta	3	(0)
2022	Herstedøster IC	11	(0)
2024	Glostrup FK		

International career
2013–2019	Pakistan	10	(0)
- * Club domestic league appearances and goals

Yaqoob Ijaz Butt (born 9 September 1988) is a former professional footballer who played as a centre-back. Born in Denmark, he represented Pakistan at the international level.

== Club career ==
Butt started his career at Stenløse, and subsequently played at the lower divisions of Denmark. In 2014, Butt was approached by Thai League 1 club Roi Et PB United in a 5 million Thai baht deal, though the move seemingly failed to materialise.

== International career ==
Butt hunted for national team call up, first approaching the Pakistan Football Federation in 2007 at the age of 18. While he was eventually not called up due to being too young and incomplete documentation being another reason, he came into radar again in 2010, when Pakistan International XI, a team made up of European based players of Pakistani origin played against Woking FC. Butt was subsequently called by the Pakistan national team coach Graham Roberts for the 2010 Asian Games, but incomplete documents prevented his participation.

In 2013, he received his first international cap in a friendly against Nepal, ending in a 1–0 victory for Pakistan, as a replacement for the injured international defender Atif Bashir under the coach Zaviša Milosavljević. He then played in a two-match tour against Maldives in the same month, making an impact as a substitute in the last 15 minutes in the game, where his corner led to Pakistan scoring a last-minute equalizer.

In March 2013, he participated in the 2014 AFC Challenge Cup qualification, playing against Tajikistan, Kyrgyzstan and Macau. He was subsequently called for the 2013 SAFF Championship.

After being left out for both the 2014 Asian Games and 2018 FIFA World Cup's Asian qualifiers 1st round of March 2015, Butt returned after almost 5 years away in a friendly against Palestine in 2018. He last played in 2019 in the 2022 FIFA World Cup qualification against Cambodia, as Pakistan failed to advance to the next round.

== Personal life ==
His brother, Yousuf Butt, is also a footballer and has played alongside him for Pakistan. Butt also went to school with Hassan Bashir in Denmark, who eventually played alongside him in the national team.

== Career statistics ==
=== International ===
As of 28 June 2020

Appearances and goals by national team and year
National team	Year	Apps	Goals
Pakistan	2013	7	0
Pakistan	2018	1	0
Pakistan	2019	2	0
Total		10	0

== See also ==
- List of Pakistan international footballers born outside Pakistan
