= FA Umbro Fives =

The FA Umbro Fives was a national 5-a-side football competition run by The Football Association. The National Final was held every year at Wembley Stadium with winners from Regional Finals across the country competing to become the official 5-a-side champions of England. "The FA Umbro Fives" usually refers to the English men's tournament, although a women's tournament was also held with the final also at Wembley Stadium. The competition was named after its lead sponsor Umbro.

MDU are the reigning FA Umbro Fives champions after beating Top Draw 4-2 needing extra time in the 2010 National Final. The 2010 competition was launched on 16 August 2010 by The FA with a video including sports presenter Tim Lovejoy and England international Michael Owen.

== Format ==
The FA Umbro Fives was open to all men and women in England aged over 16. Local Qualifiers are held across the country by approved 5-a-side football centres with teams entering via application. As of August 2010 entry costs £25 per team. Sites owned by major commercial providers of 5-a-side football including Goals Soccer Centres and Playfootball.net hold the majority of Local Qualifiers, with some County Football Associations also hosting Local Qualifiers.

Winners from the Local Qualifiers in the men's competition progress to one of seven Regional Finals in London, South East, South West, Midlands, North, North East and the North West. The winning teams in the Regional Finals win a cash prize, while the top four teams from each Regional Final progress to the National Final at Wembley Stadium. The National Final includes a Group Stage before a knock-out competition with one team crowned the official 5-a-side champions of England.

For the 2010 competition women's teams enter the competition directly into the Regional Final before the top teams are awarded a place in the National Final.

== Previous winners ==
- 2010 Men's Champions - MDU
- 2010 Women's Champions - Newcastle United Blues
- 2009 Men's Champions - Ballers.com
- 2009 Women's Champions - Watford Ladies
- 2008 Men's Champions - Top Ballerz
- 2008 Women's Champions - Liverbirds
- 2007 Men's Champions - MDU
- 2007 Women's Champions - Watford Ladies

== Dave Bloke campaign ==
The 2010 FA Umbro Fives was launched on 16 August 2010 with a promotional video featuring 'Dave Bloke, Wembley Legend'. The film stars former England hero and striker Michael Owen, who is eclipsed by a fictional character called Dave Bloke. Bloke steals Owen's limelight by becoming a Wembley Legend after scoring a hat-trick in the FA Umbro Fives final. The film uses the strapline 'Become a Wembley Legend' and asks people to sign up to the FA Umbro Fives microsite.

The film features the song Widths and Heights by band Magic Arm.
