= Hassan Bashir =

Pakistani footballer (born 1987)

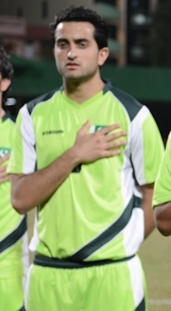
- Bashir with Pakistan in 2013

Personal information
- Full name: Hassan Naweed Bashir
- Date of birth: 7 January 1987 (age 39)
- Place of birth: Copenhagen, Denmark
- Height: 1.85 m (6 ft 1 in)
- Position: Forward

Team information
- Current team: Brøndby Strand IK

Youth career
- B.93

Senior career*
Years	Team	Apps	(Gls)
2006–2007	B.93	1	(0)
2007–2009	Køge	25	(5)
2009	Brønshøj	8	(1)
2009–2010	Svendborg	12	(8)
2010	Fyn	12	(3)
2010–2011	HIK	25	(12)
2011–2012	Svebølle B&I	13	(5)
2012	BBCU	4	(1)
2012–13	HIK	2	(1)
2013	Nordvest	12	(5)
2013–2015	Fremad Amager	+1	(+3)
2015	Svebølle B&I	?	(?)
2015–2016	Dordoi Bishkek	15	(6)
2016	BSV	+1	(+3)
2018	Greve	3	(0)
2018–2021	AB Tårnby		
2021–2023	Ishøj		
2023	Tårnby FF		
2024	VB 1968		
2024–2025	Brøndby Strand IK		

International career
2012–2023	Pakistan	29	(9)
- * Club domestic league appearances and goals

Hassan Naweed Bashir (Urdu: حسن نوید بشیر; born 7 January 1987) is a former professional footballer. Bashir has played much of his career as a forward, but has been deployed in a variety of attacking roles – as an offensive midfielder, second striker and centre forward. Born in Denmark, he played internationally for the Pakistan national team. Nicknamed as Hitman, he had been praised for his positioning, teamwork and link-up play, and had shown consistency in scoring and creating goals. A former captain and key player of the national team in the 2010s, he is seen as one of the best strikers to play for Pakistan.

Bashir debuted in senior football with B.93 Copenhagen in the Danish 2nd Division during the 2006–07 season, transitioning from the youth academy. After a season, he moved to Køge BK in 2007 and subsequently played for various Danish clubs, including Brønshøj, Svendborg, Fyn, Hellerup IK and Svebølle. In 2012, Bashir briefly joined Thailand's BBCU before returning to Denmark with Hellerup, Nordvest and Fremad Amager. His international journey continued with Dordoi Bishkek in the Kyrgyz Premier League in 2015. In 2016, he returned to Denmark joining BSV. After a hiatus, he joined Greve Fodbold in 2018 prior joining AB Tårnby. He later moved to Ishøj IF in March 2021 and then to Tårnby FF in 2023. Despite a brief return to Ishøj IF in the second half of 2023, he left the club by year-end.

Bashir made his international debut with Pakistan in November 2012 against Singapore, scoring his first goal in February 2013 against Nepal. His performance in 2013 earned him recognition as Pakistan's best performer. Appointed captain in 2015, Bashir led Pakistan to victory against Afghanistan, contributing two assists and scored in the FIFA World Cup 2018 qualifiers. Despite Pakistan's subsequent three-year suspension from international football, Bashir returned in 2018, scoring Pakistan's first international goal after the suspension against Nepal in the 2018 SAFF Championship, where he finished as the joint top scorer. After another suspension on Pakistan in 2021, Bashir had already scored 9 goals in only 21 appearances in his whole international career due to persistent bans and unrest in Pakistani football. He returned in 2022, leading Pakistan in friendlies and tournaments.

== Club career ==
=== B.93 ===
Bashir made his senior football debut for B.93 Copenhaguen in the Danish 2nd Division in the 2006–07 season, having previously played for the team's youth academy.

=== Køge ===
He spent one season in B.93, before moving to Køge BK in the 2007 summer transfer window. Bashir was the top scorer and top assist maker the first half of the season, until eventually running into a groin injury for almost one year.

=== Brønshøj & Svendborg ===
After a brief stint at Brønshøj Boldklub, Bashir joined Svendborg in 2009. Bashir along with partner striker Rasmussen accounted for 14 of FC Svendborg's 24 goals in the autumn's 2nd division.

=== Fyn ===
In 2010 winter window, Bashir moved to FC Fyn in Danish 1st Division, after starting his studies in nearby city Odense far away from his hometown Copenhagen. In June 2010, Bashir decided to terminate the contract voluntarily with the club briefly after.

=== HIK ===
After getting his studies transferred to Copenhagen again, Bashir signed for Hellerup IK in Danish 2nd Division. He was the topscorer for the club in 2010–11 season, where he netted 12 goals in 25 games throughout his stay.

=== Svebølle ===
In 2011, Bashir joined Svebølle B&I in the Danish 2nd Division.

=== BBCU ===
In March 2012, Bashir joined Thai Premier League club BBCU for the 2012 season, becoming the second Pakistani footballer to join a Thai football club after Zesh Rehman. He had previously been approached by the club in 2011 before rejecting the offer due to family commitments.

=== HIK & Nordvest ===
Bashir returned to Hellerup in 2012, and had a brief stint at Nordvest in 2013.

=== Fremad Amager ===
In August 2013, Bashir joined Fremad Amager. In November 2013, Bashir secured a hat-trick for Fremad Amager, leading them to a 7–2 away victory against Skjold Birkerød in the Danish 2nd division East. Despite being 2–1 down in the 58th minute, Fremad staged a comeback, scoring all goals in the second half. Bashir, coming on as a substitute with 24 minutes left, made a significant impact, scoring in the 64th and 83rd minutes, and completing his hat-trick in injury time. The win elevated Fremad to second place in the division table.

In 2015, Bashir stated his willing to rescind his contract with the club to represent the national team, after the difficulty to attend the mandatory 10-day camps, stating “ I would break my contract to play for the country.”

=== Svebølle return ===
In 2015, Bashir returned to Svebølle B&I, where he joined fellow national team players, Yousuf Butt and Nabil Aslam.

=== Dordoi Bishkek ===
In 2015, he moved to Dordoi Bishkek in the Kyrgyz Premier League, following the departure from the club of fellow national team player Kaleemullah and joining Muhammad Adil.

=== BSV ===
In 2016, he had a brief stint at BSV. In February 2016, Bashir scored a hat-trick on his debut with the club in a 7–0 victory against fellow Danish 2nd division side Glostrup.

=== Later career ===
After a two-year hiatus, he joined Greve Fodbold in 2018. In July 2018, Hassan Bashir joined AB Tårnby. In August 2018, he made his debut against Karlslunde where he scored a goal. Later on he was joined by Pakistan national team fellow Yousuf Butt. In June 2020, when AB Tårnby defeated Karlslunde in the second promotion match, AB Tårnby promoted to Danish 2nd Division.

Bashir moved to the Denmark Series club Ishøj IF on 18 March 2021. He moved to Tårnby FF in 2023. He played in the second half of 2023 for his former club, Ishøj IF, but left the club again at the end of the year.

In January 2024, Bashir moved to VB 1968 along with club and national team compatriot Yousuf Butt. On 24 July 2024, the Instagram handle of Brøndby Strand IK, another lower-division Danish club announced the signing of Bashir. Bashir cited his son, who also played in the club, as one of the reasons he joined the team.

== International career ==
=== 2011–2013: Rise to prominence ===
In early 2011, Bashir declared his intention to play for Pakistan. In August 2011, he was called to the training camp with Pakistan for a two-match friendly series against India played in England, where he impressed the national team manager Tariq Lutfi. However, the tournament, to be held in Britain, was cancelled just a day before the team's departure for London.

He was again called a year later in 2012 by then Pakistan coach Zaviša Milosavljević. On 19 November 2012, Bashir made his international debut for Pakistan in a friendly match against Singapore in the eventual 0–4 defeat. On 6 February 2013, he scored his first goal in his second match for Pakistan, in the 90th minute in a 1–0 victory over Nepal, and later provided the assist for Muhammad Mujahid's winning goal in the second friendly game against Nepal. At the 2014 AFC Challenge Cup qualification after missing the second game being sidelined with injury against hosts Kyrgyzstan, he scored his first penalty goal against Macau at the 44th minute, as Pakistan won the match by 2–0. He scored again against Nepal in the 2013 SAFF Championship in the eventual 1–1 draw. At the end of the year despite facing criticism from local coaches against overseas national team players, Bashir was arguably declared Pakistan's best performer in the 2013 calendar year.

=== 2015–2019: Captaincy and suspensions ===
In 2015, Bashir was appointed captain of the national team for the one-off friendly against Afghanistan. On February 6, 2015, Bashir provided two assists against Afghanistan as Pakistan won the match 2–1. On March 12, 2015, Bashir scored his first goal in the FIFA World Cup 2018 qualifiers against Yemen in the first leg from the penalty spot in the 66th minute as Pakistan lost the match by 1–3.

Bashir missed international exposure for the next 3 years, as Pakistan was suspended from all football activities by FIFA on 10 October 2017. For three years since March 2015, Pakistan remained suspended from any international competition because of the crisis created inside the Pakistan Football Federation. Bashir along with other national team players meanwhile participated with Pakistan during local Leisure Leagues exhibitions matches involving Brazilian star Ronaldinho and Ryan Giggs in 2017.

On September 4, 2018, Bashir scored Pakistan's first international goal from the penalty spot when his national side returned to international circuit after 3 years against Nepal in a 2–1 win in the 2018 SAFF Championship. He also had scored country's last goal 3 years back against Yemen which was also from the penalty spot. On September 8, 2018, Bashir scored the opener against Bhutan in a 3–0 win which was Pakistan's last game of the group stage and Pakistan sealed its place in the semi-finals. He terminated the campaign finishing as joint top scorer of the tournament along with Manvir Singh with 3 goals.

On November 16, 2018, Bashir scored another goal for Pakistan at the 16th minute in a friendly against Palestine in a 1–2 loss. The goal would make him end the year with 4 goals in 5 matches. In June 2019, he scored the opener against Cambodia in the 2022 FIFA World Cup qualifiers, in the eventual loss by 1–2.

=== 2022–2023: Decline and last years ===
Pakistan were once again suspended from all football activities by FIFA on 7 April 2021. During that time, Bashir had already scored 9 goals for Pakistan in only 21 appearances in his whole international career due to persistent bans and unrest in Pakistani football.

The suspension was lifted on 29 June 2022. In November the same year at the age of 35, he was included in Pakistan's squad as captain for a friendly against Nepal, Pakistan's first fixture in nearly three-and-a-half years because of the Pakistan Football Federation's suspension by FIFA. He made an appearance in the match as starter in the eventual 0–1 loss. He played a second friendly match against Maldives in March 2023 again losing 0–1. He subsequently took part in the 2023 Mauritius Four Nations Cup featuring Mauritius, Kenya, Djibouti and the 2023 SAFF Championship alongside India, Kuwait and Nepal in the group stages, losing all six matches and finishing last in the group in each competition. He was dropped from the preliminary squad for the 2026 FIFA World Cup qualification.

== Personal life ==
Born into a Pakistani family in Copenhagen, Bashir has seven brothers and one sister. His family originates from the city of Gujrat in Pakistan. His father immigrated to Denmark at the age of 25, due to rising tensions in Pakistan during the Cold War.

Bashir also went to school with Yousuf Butt and Yaqoob Butt in Denmark, who eventually played alongside him in the national team. Bashir has cited Juventus as his favourite club, and has described Alessandro Del Piero and Zlatan Ibrahimovic as his inspiration. He is a practising Muslim, and can fluently speak Danish, English, Punjabi, Urdu and some German.

After receiving an injury during his football stint in Thailand in 2012 with BBCU, and subsequently having to drop down to the lower divisions of Denmark, Bashir started working as banker while training three of four times a week.

== Career statistics ==
=== International ===
Appearances and goals by national team and year
National team	Year	Apps	Goals
Pakistan	2012	1	0
Pakistan	2013	11	3
Pakistan	2015	3	1
Pakistan	2018	5	4
Pakistan	2019	2	1
Pakistan	2022	1	0
Pakistan	2023	6	0
Total		29	9

Scores and results list Pakistan's goal tally first, score column indicates score after each Bashir goal.

List of international goals scored by Hassan Bashir
No.	Date	Venue	Opponent	Score	Result	Competition
1	6 February 2013	Dasarath Rangasala Stadium, Kathmandu, Nepal	Nepal	1–0	1–0	Friendly
2	21 March 2013	Spartak Stadium, Bishkek, Kyrgyzstan	Macau	1–0	2–0	2014 AFC Challenge Cup qualification
3	3 September 2013	Dasarath Rangasala Stadium, Kathmandu, Nepal	Nepal	1–0	1–1	2013 SAFF Championship
4	12 March 2015	Grand Hamad Stadium, Doha, Qatar	Yemen	1–2	1–3	2018 FIFA World Cup qualification
5	4 September 2018	Bangabandhu National Stadium, Dhaka, Bangladesh	Nepal	1–0	2–1	2018 SAFF Championship
6	8 September 2018	Bangabandhu National Stadium, Dhaka, Bangladesh	Bhutan	2–0	3–0	2018 SAFF Championship
7	12 September 2018	Bangabandhu National Stadium, Dhaka, Bangladesh	India	1–3	1–3	2018 SAFF Championship
8	16 November 2018	Faisal Al-Husseini International Stadium, Al-Ram, Palestine	Palestine	1–0	1–2	Friendly
9	11 June 2019	Hamad bin Khalifa Stadium, Doha, Qatar	Cambodia	1–0	1–2	2022 FIFA World Cup qualification

== See also ==
- List of Pakistan national football team captains
- List of Pakistan international footballers born outside Pakistan
