= Shahed Ahmed =

Professional footballer (born 1985)

Personal information
- Full name: Shahed Ahmed
- Date of birth: 13 September 1985 (age 41)
- Place of birth: East Ham, England
- Position: Striker

Youth career
- 2003–2004: Wimbledon

Senior career*
Years	Team	Apps	(Gls)
2004–2005	Wycombe Wanderers	4	(1)
2005–2006	Wingate & Finchley	17	(0)
2011–2016	Sporting Bengal United		
2016–2017	Wadham Lodge	3	(0)
- * Club domestic league appearances and goals as of 19:36, 25 December 2025 (UTC)

Shahed Ahmed (Arabic: شاهد أحمد; born 13 September 1985) is a former English footballer who played as a striker.

== Background ==
Born in Tower Hamlets, East London, Ahmed is of Bangladeshi descent.

== Playing career ==
After beginning as a youth player at Wimbledon, Ahmed signed a professional contract with Wycombe Wanderers in 2004. He made four appearances in The Football League for Wycombe, scoring one goal in the 2–0 victory against Kidderminster Harriers in August 2004. He also made one appearance in other competitions, before leaving in 2005.

Ahmed later played non-league football with Wingate & Finchley, where he made 17 league appearances.

Ahmed's Bangladeshi roots and British residency, means that he can play for either Bangladesh or England. In January 2010, he was targeted by the Bangladesh Football Federation to represent Bangladesh at the 2010 South Asian Games; he was unable to do so due to his exams.

In February 2011, Ahmed joined Sporting Bengal United in the Essex Senior Football League, where he later became club captain. Ahmed played for the club up until the 2015–16 season. Ahmed later played for Wadham Lodge.

== Personal life ==
In 2004, at the time of his move to Wycombe, Ahmed commented: "You do not see too many Asian players in football because they need to make a breakthrough. Other sports, such as cricket and squash, are more popular with the Asian community and parents do not encourage their children to play and watch football."

Ahmed is Muslim and fasts during Ramadan. He also changes his diet and adapts his training around his fasting.
