= Amjad Iqbal =

Footballer (born 1981)

Personal information
- Full name: Amjad Iqbal
- Date of birth: 2 May 1983 (age 43)
- Place of birth: Bradford, England
- Positions: Defender; midfielder

Youth career
- Bradford City

Senior career*
Years	Team	Apps	(Gls)
- Thackley
2002–2009	Farsley Celtic	92	(8)
2009–2010	Bradford Park Avenue		
2010–?	Farsley		
- Bradford Park Avenue
2013	FC United of Manchester	1	(0)

International career
2007–2009	Pakistan	5	(0)
- * Club domestic league appearances and goals

Amjad Iqbal (Urdu: امجد اقبال; born 2 May 1983) is a former footballer who played as a defender or midfielder. Born and raised in England, he played for the Pakistan national team.

== Club career ==
Born to a British Pakistani family in Bradford, West Yorkshire, Iqbal started his career at youth level with Bradford City before moving to local non-league club, Thackley in the Northern Counties East Football League and signed for Farsley Celtic in 2002.

Iqbal helped Farsley achieve four promotions in five years, the last promotion being in the 2006–07 season when they were promoted to the Conference National with Iqbal as club captain. Iqbal played 20 consecutive games for Farsley in their 2006–07 promotion season in which they finished in fifth place in the Conference North and beat Hinckley United in the play-off final to earn promotion to the Conference National. He has twice won the Farsley Player of the Year award. He remained with Farsley until March 2009, when he rejoined his former manager Lee Sinnott at Bradford Park Avenue.

In August 2010, he returned to Farsley to play for the reformed Farsley AFC in the Northern Counties East Football League.

In 2013, Iqbal joined FC United of Manchester. He played in one league game and one cup game for the club.

== International career ==
Iqbal become Farsley's first international when he received a call up to the Pakistan squad for the 2010 FIFA World Cup qualifying matches against Iraq, in October 2007. Pakistan lost 7–0 on aggregate over two matches, but held Iraq to a 0–0 draw in the second leg. However, Iqbal could not take part in the AFC Challenge Cup 2008 and was not called up for 2008 SAFF Championship due to club and work commitments. He did play in SAFF Cup 2009 for Pakistan after a two-year absence from national team.

== Career statistics ==
=== International ===
Appearances and goals by year and competition
National team	Year	Apps	Goals
Pakistan	2007	2	0
Pakistan	2009	3	0
Total		5	0

== Personal life ==
Iqbal is a British Pakistani and is born to Pakistani parents. Other than being a football player, Iqbal is also a part-time chemistry lecturer at Bradford College. His nickname was Ammers at Farsley.

== See also ==
- British Asians in association football
- List of Pakistan international footballers born outside Pakistan
