= Mohammad Ali (footballer, born 1989) =

Pakistani footballer (born 1989)

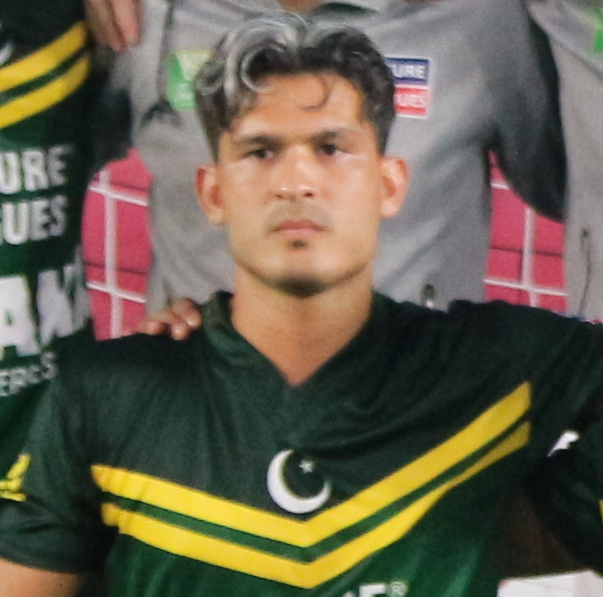
- Ali in 2019

Personal information
- Full name: Daniyal Mohammad Reza Ali Nazari
- Date of birth: 2 September 1989 (age 37)
- Place of birth: Copenhagen, Denmark
- Height: 1.82 m (6 ft 0 in)
- Position: Striker

Team information
- Current team: Tårnby FF

Youth career
- Brønshøj
- B93

Senior career*
Years	Team	Apps	(Gls)
2008–2010	B93		
2010	FCK 2		
2010–2011	B93		
2011	HB Køge		
2011–2012	B93		
2012	Hvidovre		
2012–2014	BK Avarta		
2014–2015	Svebølle B&I		
2015–2016	Holbæk B&I		
2016–2018	B93		
2018–2019	Greve Fodbold		
2019–2021	Ishøj IF		
2021–2023	Tårnby FF		
2024	Glostrup FK		
2025–	Tårnby FF		

International career
2012–2019	Pakistan	16	(1)
- * Club domestic league appearances and goals

Daniyal Mohammad Reza Ali Nazari (born 2 September 1989) is a Pakistani professional footballer who plays as a forward for Tårnby FF. Born in Denmark, he played for the Pakistan national team. Ali has been praised for his dribbling abilities and commitment on the pitch.

== Early and personal life ==
Ali was born on 2 September 1989 in Copenhagen, Denmark. His family originate from the city of Quetta in Pakistan.

Mohammad's father Qurban Ali was also a footballer, and was previously persuaded to play for the Pakistan national team.

== Club career ==
=== Early career ===
Ali started playing around 12–13 years old, in a local team near his home called Brønshøj for fun with his friends. After a match against B93 Copenhagen, he was called by them and joined the club. As 15 years old he signed his first contract with the team. He served as the team captain in the u17 and u19 level in the Danish youth league. Ali helped win the KBU cup final for U19, when B.93 won over Frem by 4–2 in Valby Idrætspark scoring two of the goals.

He made his debut for the B93 senior team at the age of 18 on 23 March 2008 away against Glostrup in a 1–0 victory. In his debut season, Ali played 27 games and scored five goals.

=== FC Copenhagen reserves ===
Mohammad Ali switched to F.C. Copenhagen reserves team in the spring of 2010 amidst the 2009–10 Danish 2nd Divisions. His move costed B.93 the promotion, as B.93 lost the first game in 2010 by 1–2 away in Peter Bangs Vej, with Ali scoring both goals for FCK, and Bashkim Kadrii scoring the lone goal for B.93.

=== Køge ===
With chances of breaking into the senior team bleak, Ali then linked up with Køge in the Danish 1st Division in 2011, where he helped them gain promotion to the Danish SuperLiga until he received an 8-month injury.

=== Return to B.93 ===
At the end of autumn 2011, Ali returned to B.93, where he managed to play two games before the winter break.

=== Hvidovre ===
In the spring of 2012, Ali played for Hvidovre, where he scored one goal in 3 matches.

=== Avarta ===
During the 2012 summer break, he signed for BK Avarta in the Danish 2nd division, where he eventually became the club's vice captain.

=== Svebolle & Hollbaek ===
He moved to Svebølle Danish 2nd Division in January 2014. He also had a short stint at Hollbaek the same autumn.

=== Return to B.93 ===
In January 2016, Ali moved back to his former club B93 on a one-season deal. He was signed as replacement for the team's top scorer Olcay Senoglu, who had moved to Fremad Amager. At the end of the year, his contract was renewed for an additional season. Ali left the club by the end of 2017.

=== Later career ===
In 2018, he signed for Greve Fodbold, where he was joined by national team fellow goalkeeper Yousuf Butt.

He moved to Ishoj in 2019, until signing for Tårnby FF in September 2021. He stayed in the club until February 2023.

On 21 July 2024, Ali joined Glostrup FK. He later returned to Tårnby FF.

== International career ==
He was called in the camps for Danish youth national team at U-17 nor U-19 level, but did not get selected.

He made his international debut in 2012 with Pakistan against Singapore, and scored his first goal for the team against Nepal at the 2018 SAFF Championship.

== Career statistics ==
=== International ===
Appearances and goals by national team and year
National team	Year	Apps	Goals
Pakistan	2012	1	0
Pakistan	2013	5	0
Pakistan	2015	2	0
Pakistan	2018	6	1
Pakistan	2019	2	0
Total		16	1

Scores and results list Pakistan's goal tally first, score column indicates score after each Ali goal.

List of international goals scored by Mohammad Ali
No.	Date	Venue	Opponent	Score	Result	Competition
1	4 September 2018	Bangabandhu National Stadium, Dhaka, Bangladesh	Nepal	2–1	2–1	2018 SAFF Championship

== See also ==
- List of Pakistan international footballers born outside Pakistan
