= Nabil Aslam =

Pakistani footballer (born 1984)

Personal information
- Full name: Mohammad Nabil Aslam
- Date of birth: 3 August 1984 (age 42)
- Place of birth: Kongens Lyngby, Denmark
- Height: 1.82 m (6 ft 0 in)
- Position: Centre back

Youth career
- 2004–2005: Brøndby IF
- 2005–2007: BK Frem

Senior career*
| Years | Team | Apps | (Gls) |
| 2003–2008 | BK Frem | 73 | (1) |
| 2003–2004 | → Hvidovre IF (loan) | 12 | (0) |
| 2008–2015 | AC Horsens | 98 | (2) |
| 2014–2015 | → AB (loan) | 8 | (0) |
| 2015 | Svebølle B&I | | |
| 2015 | Kalundborg GB | | |
| 2016–2017 | Glostrup FK | | |
| 2017–2020 | VB 1968 | | |

International career
| 2015 | Pakistan | 1 | (0) |
Medal record
AC Horsens
| Winner | Danish 1st Division | 2009–10 |
| Runner-up | Danish Cup | 2012 |
- * Club domestic league appearances and goals

Mohammad Nabil Aslam (Urdu: محمد نبيل اسلم; born 3 August 1984) is a former professional footballer who played as a defender. Born in Denmark, he played for the Pakistan national team.

A defender, Aslam primarily played as centre back, although he also was capable as full back on either side. Physically strong and composed, he garnered a reputation as a tough-tackling, versatile defender.

== Club career ==
=== BK Frem ===
Aslam started his career at Brøndby IF before moving to BK Frem where he developed from the youth ranks to the main team. After spending a few seasons at Frem he left the club.

==== Loan to Hvidovre IF ====
Aslam was loaned out to Hvidovre IF in February 2004 together with his teammate Ali Sheihi. His season at Hvidovre was so good, that Frem wanted to get him back and playing him on the second team.

==== Back to BK Frem ====
After he went back from his loan stay, he established himself as an important player for the first team squad and was rewarded with a contract until 2007. He became a very important player for the club and extend his contract once again, when it expired in 2007. Despite his young age, he played in 100 matches for the club, before leaving it in the summer 2008.

=== AC Horsens ===
He joined AC Horsens in July 2008 and established himself as an integral part of the team reaching the final of 2011–12 Danish Cup, later helping Horsens reach the Europa League play-off round in the 2012–13 season.

After two days at the club, he suffered from an injury in his back. After 10 league matches in his first season, he extended his contract in the summer 2009 until 2012. AC Horsens was relegated to the Danish 1st Division in after his first season.

Aslam had a good 2009–10 season until October, where he slammed his shoulder out of joint and was out for the rest of the year. He went back from the injury in February 2011. AC Horsens was promoted back to the Danish Superliga after this season.

But the new season in the Danish Superliga didn't start well for Aslam. In August 2011, he suffered an anterior cruciate ligament injury and was out for two months. In January 2012, he extended his contract once again, this time until 2015. In the 2012/13 season, Aslam suffered many injuries.

After Johnny Mølby was appointed as the manager for the 2013/14 season, Aslam revealed that he wanted to leave the club because he didn't expect to play. He remained at the club but got injured once again. After only 7 games for the club in the Danish 1st Division, his contract was terminated by AC Horsens in May 2014. He played 116 games in the yellow shirt.

In February 2015, he was called by Pakistan national team to play for the 2018 FIFA World Cup qualification match against Yemen. He made his debut for Pakistan in a 3–1 defeat against Yemen in the first-leg of the 2018 World Cup qualifiers.

=== AB ===
Aslam signed for AB in August 2014 on a free transfer. In December 2014, AB announced that Aslam wouldn't continue at the club for the rest of the season, but instead would be playing for at Thailand club. However, they didn't confirm which club he was going to play for.

=== Svebølle B&I ===
Three months after he left AB, he signed for Danish 2nd Division club Svebølle B&I.

In October 2015, Aslam together with Ken Fagerberg was invited to play a friendly match for Jönköpings Södra IF.

=== Kalundborg GB ===
Aslam joined Denmark Series club Kalundborg GB in July 2015.

=== Glostrup FK ===
He joined Glostrup FK for the 2016/17 season.

=== VB 1968 ===
Aslam joined VB 1968 for the 2017/18 season.

== International career ==
Aslam was first linked with the Pakistan national team in 2011 for the 2014 FIFA World Cup qualification, however he was omitted over pending eligibility issues. In 2012, he was again called to make his debut for Pakistan for a friendly against Singapore but his club AC Horsens did not release him due to league commitments. In 2015, he toured for unofficial friendlies in Malaysia as preparation for the 2018 FIFA World Cup qualification. He made his international debut at the 2018 FIFA World Cup qualification against Yemen in 2015. He missed the second leg due to knee injury.

== Violence episode ==
In June 2010, the AC Horsens players were out celebrating their promotion to the Danish Superliga for the 2010/11 season. Their happened some things at the nightclub and Aslam was arrested together with his teammate Martin Spelmann. He was later sentenced 30 days in prison and 30 hours of community service. AC Horsens chose not to punish him.

Aslam recognized that he that night punched a man in the face but said that it was to defend himself; he was charged. After the episode, Aslam said "Of course I regret my action and I am ready to take my Punishment."

== Honours ==
AC Horsens

- Danish 1st Division: 2009–10
- Danish Cup runner-up: 2012

== See also ==
- List of Pakistan international footballers born outside Pakistan
