= 2018 SAFF Championship =

২০১৮ সাফ চ্যাম্পিয়নশিপ

Tournament details
- Host country: Bangladesh
- Dates: 4–15 September
- Teams: 7 (from 1 sub-confederation)
- Venue: 1 (in 1 host city)

Final positions
- Champions: Maldives (2nd title)
- Runners-up: India

Tournament statistics
- Matches played: 12
- Goals scored: 29 (2.42 per match)
- Top scorer(s): (India) Manvir Singh (Pakistan) Hassan Bashir (3 goals)
- Best player: (Maldives) Mohamed Faisal
- Best goalkeeper: (Maldives) Mohamed Faisal
- Fair play award: Bhutan

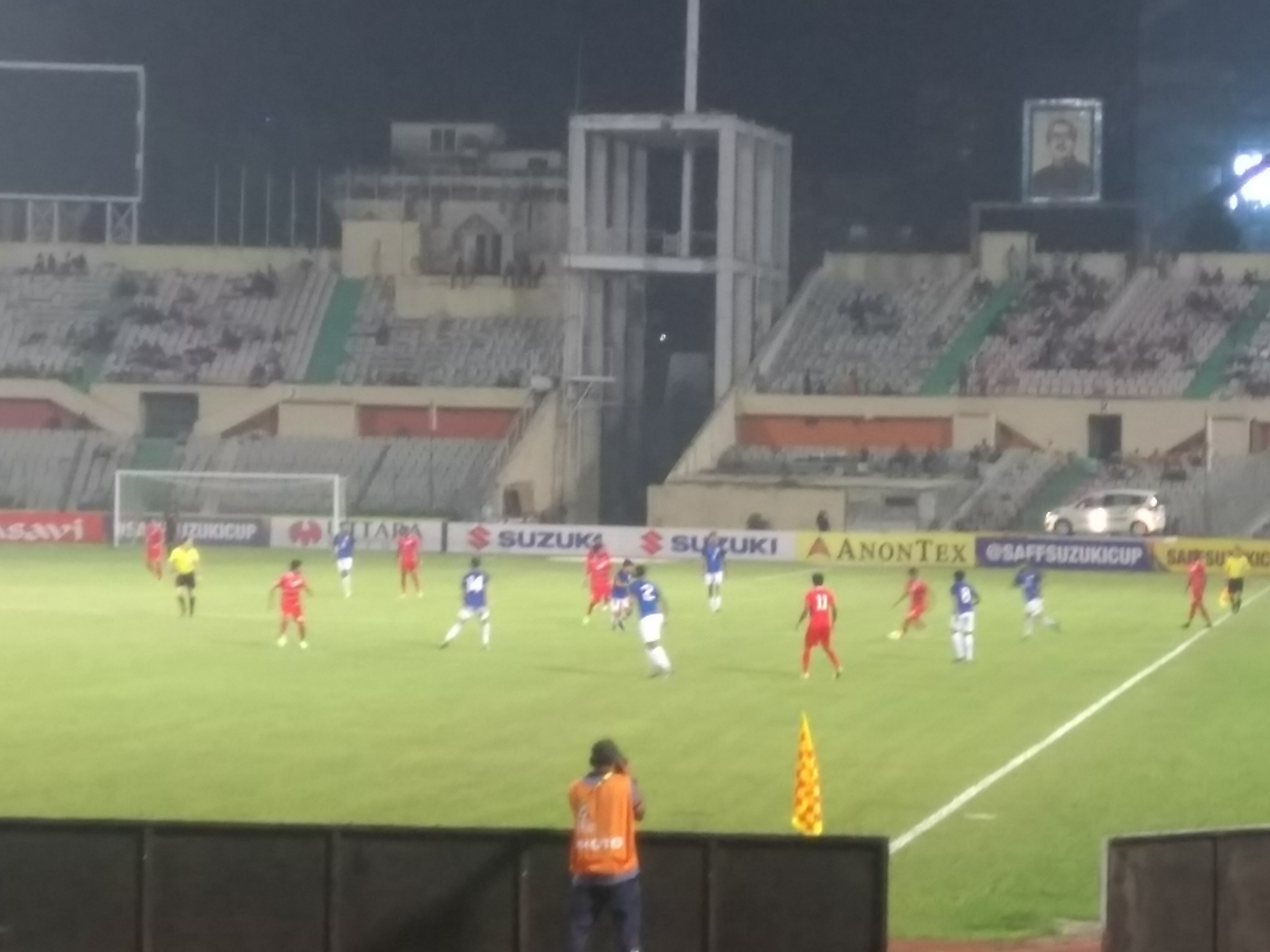
During 2018 SAFF championship final

Video of 2018 SAFF Championship Final (during the interval).

The 2018 SAFF Championship, also known as the 2018 SAFF Suzuki Cup for sponsorship reasons, was the 12th edition of the SAFF Championship, the biennial international men's football championship of South Asia organized by SAFF. It was initially scheduled to be hosted by Bangladesh in December 2017, but later rescheduled to 4–15 September 2018.

== Host selection ==
On 2 January 2016, the SAFF executive committee made a decision that Bangladesh would host the 2017 SAFF Championship at a meeting held in Trivandrum, India. Maldives and Bhutan made bids to host the games but the latter withdrew its bid.

This was the third SAFF Championship hosted by Bangladesh, after victory in the 2003 edition and semi-finalists in 2009.

The draw ceremony was held on 18 April 2018 in Dhaka.

== Participating nations ==
Country	Appearance	Previous best performance	FIFA ranking August 2018
Bangladesh (Host)	11th	Champions (2003)	194
Bhutan	8th	Semi-finals (2008)	183
India	12th	Champions (Seven times) (Note: India has won in 1993, 1997, 1999, 2005, 2009, 2011 and 2015.)	96
Maldives	10th	Champions (2008)	150
Nepal	12th	Third-Place (1993)	161
Pakistan	11th	Third-Place (1997)	201
Sri Lanka	12th	Champions (1995)	200

== Venue ==
Dhaka	2018 SAFF Championship is located in Bangladesh
Bangabandhu National Stadium	2018 SAFF Championship is located in Bangladesh
Capacity: 36,000	2018 SAFF Championship is located in Bangladesh

== Officials ==
Referees

- (India) Rowan Arumughan
- (Iran) Hasan Akrami
- (Jordan) Mohammad Arafah
- (Sri Lanka) Hettikamkanamge Perera
- (Syria) Hanna Hattab
- (Thailand) Sivakorn Pu-udom

Assistant Referees

- (Bangladesh) Manir Ahmmad Dali
- (India) Sapam Kennedy
- (Iran) Hassan Zeheiri
- (Sri Lanka) Priyanga Palliya Guruge
- (Thailand) Apichit Nophuan
- (Yemen) Ali Mohammed Al Hasani

== Group stage ==
=== Group A ===
Pos	Team	Pld	W	D	L	GF	GA	GD	Pts	Qualification
1	Nepal	3	2	0	1	7	2	+5	6	Qualified for semi-finals
2	Pakistan	3	2	0	1	5	2	+3	6	Qualified for semi-finals
3	Bangladesh (H)	3	2	0	1	3	2	+1	6	
4	Bhutan	3	0	0	3	0	9	−9	0	

Source: RSSSF
(H) Hosts
4 September 2018
16:00

Nepal	1–2	Pakistan
B. Magar 82'	Report	Bashir 36' (pen.); Mu. Ali 90+6'

Bangabandhu National Stadium, Dhaka
Referee: Mohammad Arafah (Jordan)
4 September 2018
19:00

Bangladesh	2–0	Bhutan
Barman 3' (pen.); M. Rahman 47'	Report

Bangabandhu National Stadium, Dhaka
Referee: Sivakorn Pu-udom (Thailand)

6 September 2018
16:00

Nepal	4–0	Bhutan
A. Tamang 21'; Bal 71'; Khawas 79'; Khadka 88'	Report

Bangabandhu National Stadium, Dhaka
Referee: Rowan Arumughan (India)
6 September 2018
19:00

Bangladesh	1–0	Pakistan
Barman 85'	Report

Bangabandhu National Stadium, Dhaka
Referee: Hasan Akrami (Iran)

8 September 2018
16:00

Pakistan	3–0	Bhutan
Riaz 20'; Bashir 29'; Faheem 90+1'	Report

Bangabandhu National Stadium, Dhaka
Referee: Hasan Akrami (Iran)
8 September 2018
19:00

Bangladesh	0–2	Nepal
	Report	B. Magar 33'; N. Shrestha 90'

Bangabandhu National Stadium, Dhaka
Referee: Hettikamkanamge Perera (Sri Lanka)

=== Group B ===
Pos	Team	Pld	W	D	L	GF	GA	GD	Pts	Qualification
1	India	2	2	0	0	4	0	+4	6	Qualified for semi-finals
2	Maldives	2	0	1	1	0	2	−2	1 (Note: Maldives and Sri Lanka were level on points, goal difference, goals against and head-to-head. The winner was decided by a coin toss.)	Qualified for semi-finals
3	Sri Lanka	2	0	1	1	0	2	−2	1	

Source: RSSSF
Notes:
5 September 2018
19:00

India	2–0	Sri Lanka
Kuruniyan 35'; Chhangte 47'	Report

Bangabandhu National Stadium, Dhaka
Referee: Hanna Hattab (Syria)

7 September 2018
19:00

Maldives	0–0	Sri Lanka
	Report

Bangabandhu National Stadium, Dhaka
Referee: Mohammad Arafah (Jordan)

9 September 2018
19:00

India	2–0	Maldives
Poojari 36'; M. Singh 44'	Report

Bangabandhu National Stadium, Dhaka
Referee: Hanna Hattab (Syria)

== Knockout phase ==
=== Bracket ===
Semi-finals
12 September
Nepal	0
Maldives	3
12 September
India	3
Pakistan	1

Final
15 September
Maldives	2
India	1

=== Semi-finals ===
12 September 2018
16:00

Nepal	0–3	Maldives
	Report	Ghanee 9'; I. Hassan 84', 86'

Bangabandhu National Stadium, Dhaka
Referee: Hettikamkanamge Perera (Sri Lanka)
12 September 2018
19:30

India	3–1	Pakistan
M. Singh 48', 69'; Passi 84'	Report	Bashir 88' (Note: Although RSSSF erroneously lists Muhammad Ali as the scorer against India, the goal was scored by Hassan Bashir.)

Bangabandhu National Stadium, Dhaka
Referee: Sivakorn Pu-udom (Thailand)

=== Final ===
15 September 2018
19:00

Maldives	2–1	India
Mahudhee 19'; Fasir 66'	Report	Passi 90+2'

Bangabandhu National Stadium, Dhaka
Referee: Hasan Akrami (Iran)

== Champion ==
SAFF Championship 2018

Maldives
Second title

== Awards ==
The following awards were given for the 2018 SAFF Championship.

Fair Play award	Most Valuable Player	Top Goalscorer (Note: Although RSSSF erroneously lists Muhammad Ali as the scorer against India, the goal was scored by Hassan Bashir.)
Bhutan	(Maldives) Mohamed Faisal	(India) Manvir Singh (Pakistan) Hassan Bashir

== Goalscorers ==
There were 29 goals scored in 12 matches, for an average of 2.42 goals per match.

3 goals

- (India) Manvir Singh
- (Pakistan) Hassan Bashir

2 goals

- (Bangladesh) Topu Barman
- (India) Sumeet Passi
- (Maldives) Ibrahim Waheed Hassan
- (Nepal) Bimal Gharti Magar

1 goal

- (Bangladesh) Mahbubur Rahman
- (India) Lallianzuala Chhangte
- (India) Ashique Kuruniyan
- (India) Nikhil Poojari
- (Maldives) Ali Fasir
- (Maldives) Akram Abdul Ghanee
- (Maldives) Ibrahim Mahudhee
- (Nepal) Sunil Bal
- (Nepal) Nirajan Khadka
- (Nepal) Bharat Khawas
- (Nepal) Nawayug Shrestha
- (Nepal) Ananta Tamang
- (Pakistan) Ahmed Faheem
- (Pakistan) Muhammad Ali
- (Pakistan) Muhammad Riaz

== Media coverage ==
Country	Broadcaster	Ref.
Bangladesh	Channel 9	
India	D Sport	
Maldives	Television Maldives	
Nepal	AP1 Television	
United States	Bleacher Report	
