= Atif Bashir =

Pakistani professional footballer

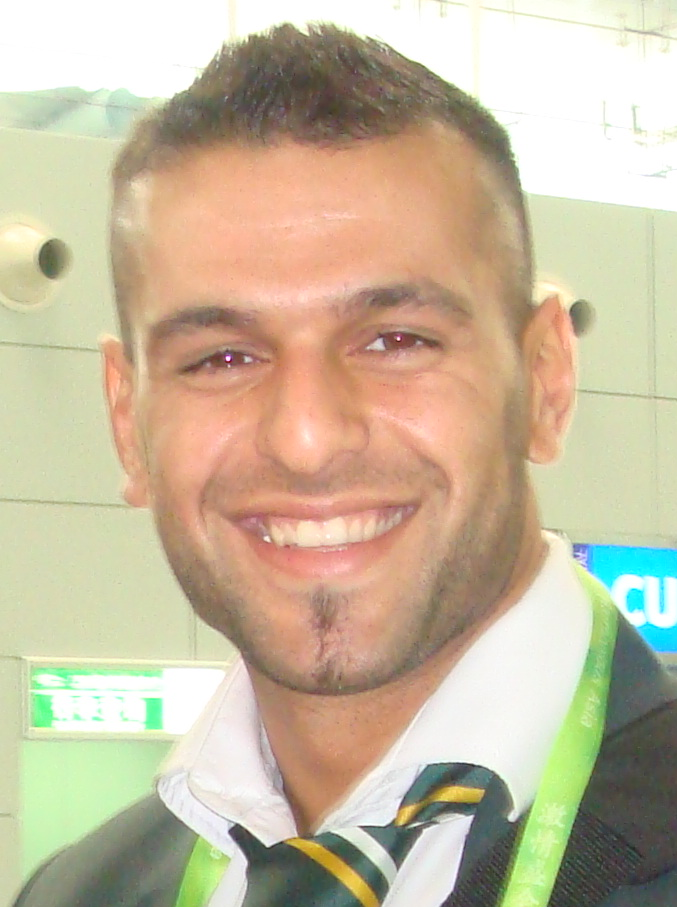
- Bashir with Pakistan in 2010

Personal information
- Full name: Atif Bashir Qureshi
- Date of birth: 3 April 1985 (age 41)
- Place of birth: West Berlin, West Germany
- Height: 1.83 m (6 ft 0 in)
- Position: Center back

Youth career
- 1994–2001: Hertha Berlin
- 2002–2004: Cardiff City

Senior career*
Years	Team	Apps	(Gls)
2004	Cardiff City	0	(0)
2004–2005	Afan Lido	11	(1)
2005–2006	Maesteg Park	34	(2)
2007–2008	Cardiff Grange Harlequins	8	(1)
2008	Haverfordwest County	3	(0)
2008–2010	Barry Town United	43	(5)
2010	Bridgend Town	10	(2)
2010–2014	Barry Town United		
2014–2017	Dinas Powys		

International career
2008–2011	Pakistan	17	(2)
- * Club domestic league appearances and goals

Atif Qureshi Bashir (Urdu: عاطف قریشی بشیر; born 3 April 1985) is a former professional football player who played as a defender. Born in Germany, he represented the Pakistan national team.

== Club career ==
=== Early career ===
Born to a German Turkish mother and British Pakistani father, Bashir started as a defender equally comfortable playing at right-back, and the centre of defence. Bashir spent seven years as a youth at professional clubs such as Hertha Berlin and Cardiff City.

=== Welsh football ===
After leaving Cardiff City, Bashir signed for Afan Lido in 2004 and played 11 games scoring 1 goal for the club. After one season with Lido, he went to Maesteg Park A.F.C. in 2005 and spent one season playing 34 games and scoring two goals. He then went to Cardiff Grange Quins in 2007, making eight appearances in the Welsh Premier League, scoring one goal. He had a short spell at the Welsh Premier League team Haverfordwest County A.F.C. and then moved to Barry Town, where he impressed and became a fans' favourite, also becoming Barry's first international player. He later on made a move to Bridgend Town in 2010 but in the same year he returned to Barry Town.

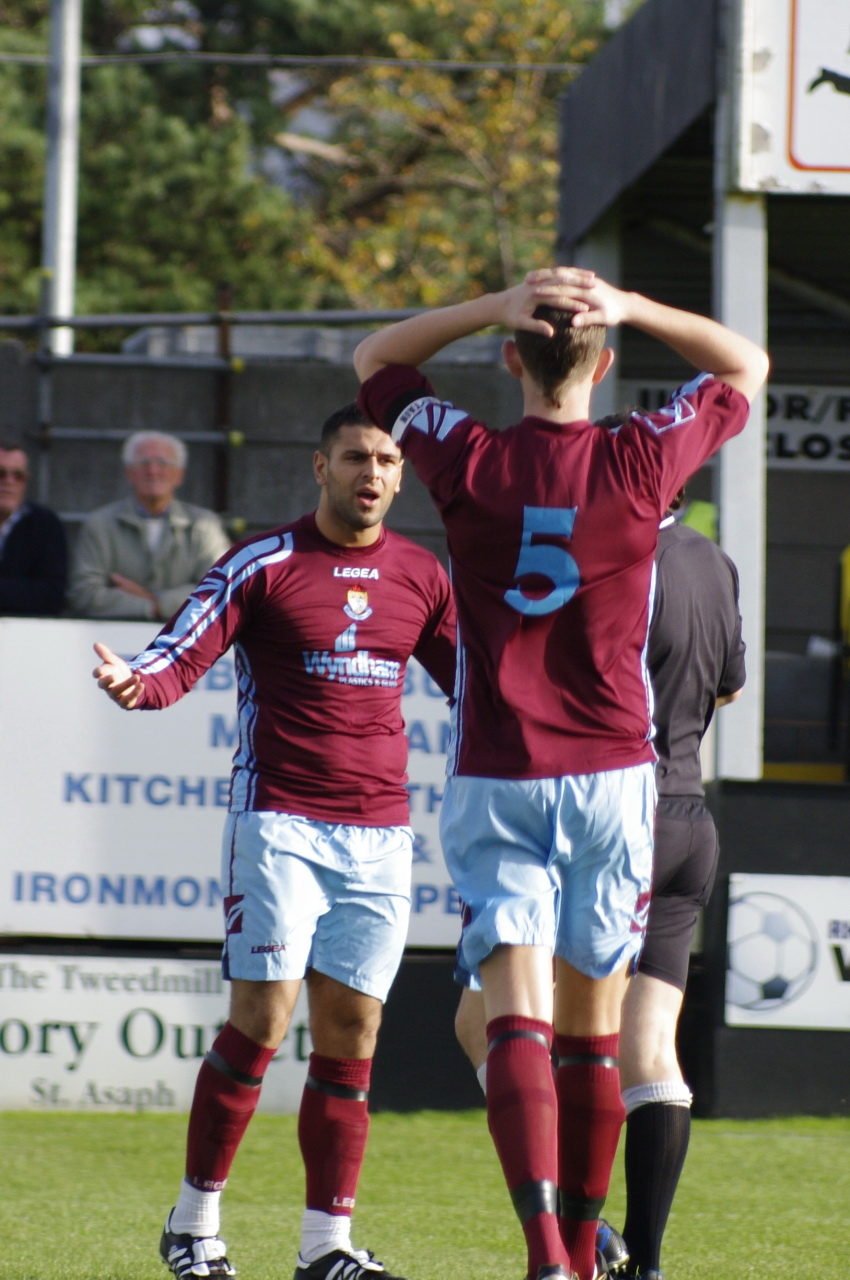
Bashir playing for Barry Town in 2009

=== English trials ===
In July 2010, Bashir had a trial with English Conference National side Luton Town. He impressed the fans in a pre-season friendly match against Dunstable Town, but he was surprisingly not offered a contract by Luton Town manager Richard Money.

In August 2010, he had a trial with another English Conference National side, Histon, playing in a pre-season friendly match against Dagenham & Redbridge. A transfer to Histon looked set to happen, but Histon manager John Beck resigned shortly after Bashir's trial, so he returned to Barry Town for the start of the 2010–11 season.

In October 2010, and then again in November 2010, Bashir undertook trial spells with Conference North outfit AFC Telford United.

Bashir undertook a trial spell with Conference National side Newport County in July 2011, featuring in a pre-season friendly match against Mangotsfield United.

=== Last years ===
Following his return to Barry town, in the 2012–13 season whilst playing against his former team Haverfordwest, he sustained an injury which put him out for the rest of the season and possibly the rest of the 2013–14 season.

At the beginning of the 2014–15 season, Bashir returned to game action for Barry Town. After a few games with the club, he departed from the club and joined local rivals, Dinas Powys.

== International career ==
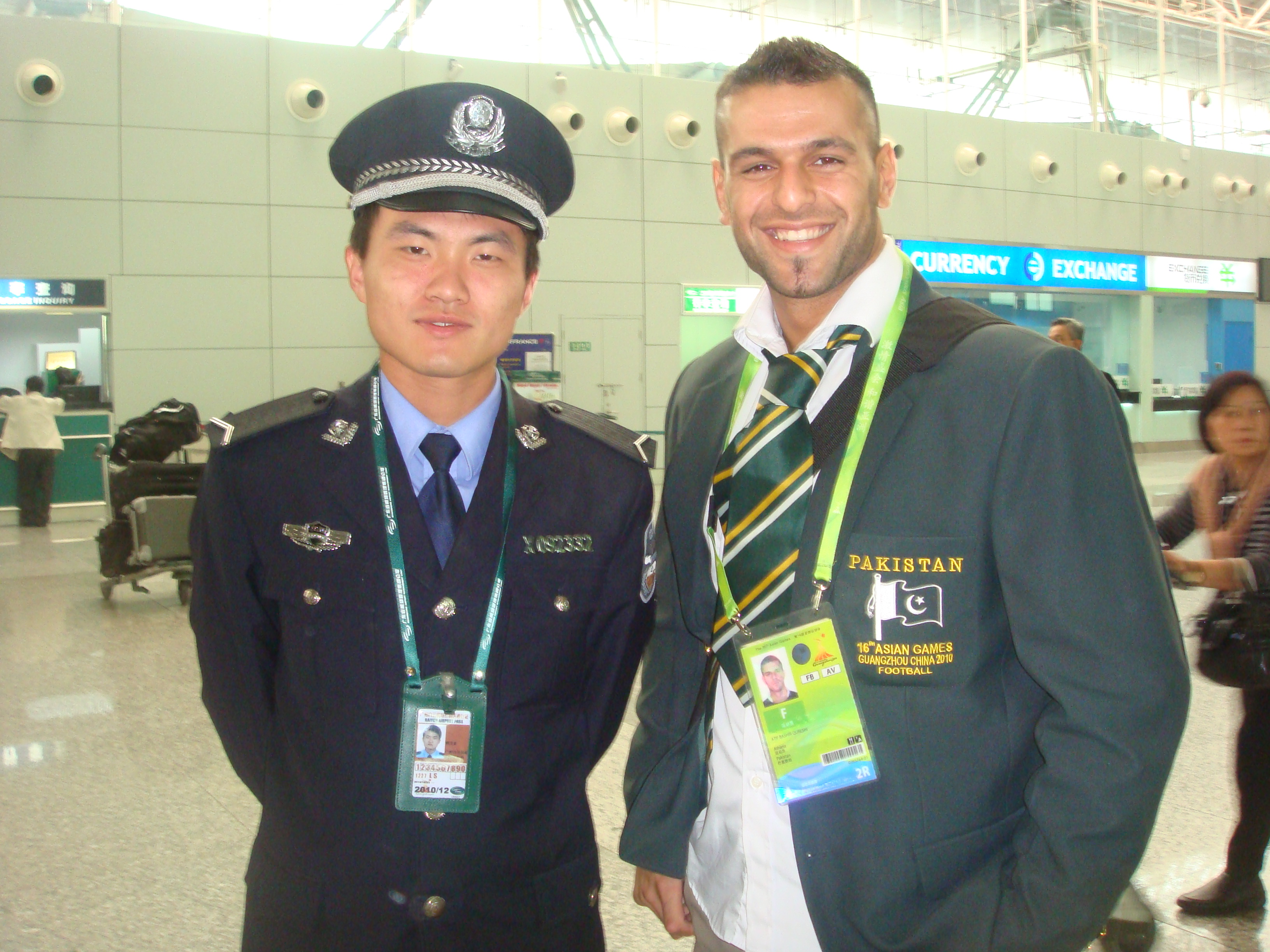
Bashir arriving at Guangzhou for the 2010 Asian Games in China.

Akhtar Mohiuddin has stated that "...born to a British-Pakistani father and a Turkish German mother, Atif could have theoretically played for Germany, Turkey, or any of the British Home Nations, as well as Pakistan whom he eventually chose. He made his debut for Pakistan in the 2008 SAFF Championship against the host Maldives, followed by matches against India and Nepal".

In 2008, Bashir was called up to represent Pakistan. Although initially part of the 2008 AFC Challenge Cup squad, he could not join the team because his Pakistani passport had not been issued. A few months later, Bashir made his International Debut for Pakistan in the 2008 SAFF Championship against the Maldives, before facing India and Nepal in the first round.

In October 2010, he was also included as one of three overage players in an under-23 Pakistan squad for the 2010 Asian Games in China, where Pakistan faced Thailand, Maldives and Oman in November 2010.

In March 2011, Bashir represented Pakistan in their unsuccessful 2012 AFC Challenge Cup qualifying campaign, appearing at the heart of the defence alongside Zesh Rehman in defeats to Turkmenistan and India. However, he helped Pakistan to victory in their final match, scoring the second goal in a 2–0 win over Chinese Taipei at the MBPJ Stadium with a long-range strike that saw Pakistan finish third in Group B.

He continued to cement his place as a regular in the Pakistan national side, featuring in both legs of the 2014 World Cup qualifiers against Bangladesh in June and July 2011. He also featured in the 2011 SAFF Championship.

In the end of 2012, a knee injury while playing for Barry Town proved to be the end of his international career, although later in 2014 he hinted a return to the national side.

== Personal life ==
Bashir was born in Berlin, Tiergarten to a Cypriot Turkish mother and a German-Pakistani father. He started his football career at the age of 8 at Hertha BSC Berlin with stints at Hertha Zehlendorf. Interests from clubs such as Tasmania Berlin and Tennis Borussia resulted in short term loans.

Apart from his football career, Bashir has some experience in modelling. He started studying for a degree in Quantity Surveying at the University of Glamorgan in September 2008. In September 2011, Bashir was awarded a full university football scholarship and had been involved in all games in the BUCS football league representing his University at the highest level in the United Kingdom.

== Career statistics ==
Appearances and goals by national team and year
National team	Year	Apps	Goals
Pakistan	2008	3	0
Pakistan	2009	6	1
Pakistan	2011	8	1
Total		17	2

Scores and results list Pakistan's goal tally first, score column indicates score after each Bashir goal.

List of international goals scored by Atif Bashir
No.	Date	Venue	Opponent	Score	Result	Competition
1	8 April 2009	Sugathadasa Stadium, Colombo, Sri Lanka	Sri Lanka	1–1	2–2	2010 AFC Challenge Cup qualification
2	25 March 2011	Petaling Jaya Stadium, Malaysia	Chinese Taipei	2–0	2–0	2012 AFC Challenge Cup qualification

== See also ==
- British Asians in association football
- List of Pakistan international footballers born outside Pakistan
