= Adam Karim =

English-Pakistani footballer

Personal information
- Full name: Adam Luke Docker
- Date of birth: 17 November 1985 (age 40)
- Place of birth: Rochdale, England
- Position: Defender

Youth career
- 2000–2005: Bury

Senior career*
Years	Team	Apps	(Gls)
2005	Altrincham	0	(0)
2005–2007	Bangor City	10	(0)
2007	Chorley	0	(0)
2007–2008	Porthmadog	3	(0)
2010	Salford City	3	(0)
2010	FC United of Manchester	1	(0)
2010	Chadderton	1	(1)
2010–2011	Ashton United	3	(0)
2012	Stranraer		
- * Club domestic league appearances and goals

Adam Karim (born Adam Luke Docker; 17 November 1985) is an English former footballer who is now a restaurateur. Born in England, he was called up for Pakistan, where he subsequently changed his name to Adam Karim.

== Club career ==
Born to a British Pakistani father and English mother, Karim began his professional football career with Bury, later joining Altrincham for a few months but then joined Bangor City in the 2005–06 season. He was released at the end of the 2006–07 season despite being a fairly impressive performer. He later joined Chorley, but in September 2007 linked up again with his former Bangor manager Clayton Blackmore when he joined Porthmadog. At the same time, he was also playing for Rochdale club Asia F.C.

Karim parted company with Porthmadog in 2008. In late 2009 he was playing for Canaries FC in the Lancashire Evening Post Sunday football league and captained them to victory in the Asian Community Cup final held at Stamford Bridge.

In February 2010, Karim joined Salford City but after a short period asked to be released and subsequently joined FC United of Manchester. He played one match for the club, coming on as a substitute. He later joined Chadderton in November 2010, scoring in the one and only match he played for the club. Karim then joined Ashton United in November 2010, playing 3 games in February 2011.

== International call-up ==
In October 2007, Karim was called up by Pakistan. He was an unused substitute in a 2010 FIFA World Cup group play-off match against Iraq. In 2010, he played for Pakistan International XI, a team made up of European based players of Pakistani origin against Woking FC.

== Personal life ==
Karim worked full-time running a restaurant in North West England while playing football simultaneously. He initially founded an Indian restaurant named Karims. He also became owner of Don Giovanni and CEO of Mahiki restaurant. In November 2009, he co-founded Rosso Restaurant in Manchester along with Rio Ferdinand.

In July 2017 he married Russian TV presenter Olga Ushakova in Cyprus, who has daughters from a previous relationship in addition to two daughters she and Karim have together, born in 2018 and 2020.
