= 2026 SAFF Championship squads =

Squads for football competition in Bangladesh

The 2026 SAFF Championship was the 15th edition of the SAFF Championship, the international men's football championship of South Asia organized by South Asian Football Federation (SAFF). The tournament was held in Dhaka National Stadium, Dhaka, Bangladesh from 5 to 17 November 2026.

The age listed for each player is as of 5 November 2026, the first day of the tournament. The club listed is the club for which the player last played a competitive match prior to the tournament. A flag is included for coaches who are of a different nationality than their own national team.

The following squads were announced by the respective national federations. Each team was permitted to register a maximum of 28 players for the tournament.

== Group A ==
=== Bangladesh ===
Bangladesh named the following 28 players to the squad. Ronan Sullivan withdrew due to injury on 1 October 2026. Isa Faysal was also dropped from the squad on 2 November. Md Taj Uddin and Abdullah Omar Sajib were called up as replacements.

Head coach: (United States) Thomas Dooley

No.	Pos.	Player	Date of birth (age)	Caps	Goals	Club
1	GK	Mehedi Hasan Srabon	12 August 2005 (aged 21)	6	0	(Bangladesh Football Federation) Bashundhara Kings
2	DF	Zidane Yousuf	22 September 2007 (aged 19)	3	0	Unattached
3	DF	Rahmat Mia	8 December 1999 (aged 26)	40	0	(Bangladesh Football Federation) Mohammedan
4	DF	Topu Barman (captain)	20 December 1994 (aged 31)	70	8	(Bangladesh Football Federation) Bashundhara Kings
5	MF	Md Ridoy	1 January 2002 (aged 24)	27	0	(Bangladesh Football Federation) Bashundhara Kings
6	MF	Jamal Bhuyan	10 April 1990 (aged 36)	96	1	(Bangladesh Football Federation) Brothers Union
7	FW	Shekh Morsalin	19 February 2005 (aged 21)	26	7	(Bangladesh Football Federation) Dhaka Abahani
8	MF	Hamza Choudhury	1 October 1997 (aged 29)	13	4	(The Football Association) Sheffield United
9	FW	Shuki Itofusa	31 March 2004 (aged 22)	3	0	(Bangladesh Football Federation) Fortis
10	FW	Rakib Hossain	18 November 1998 (aged 27)	53	6	(Bangladesh Football Federation) Bashundhara Kings
11	FW	Foysal Ahmed Fahim	24 February 2002 (aged 24)	33	1	(Bangladesh Football Federation) Mohammedan
12	DF	Bishwanath Ghosh	30 May 1999 (aged 27)	46	0	(Bangladesh Football Federation) Bashundhara Kings
13	GK	Mitul Marma	11 December 2003 (aged 22)	21	0	(Bangladesh Football Federation) Dhaka Abahani
14	DF	Tariq Kazi	6 October 2000 (aged 26)	41	2	(Bhutan Football Federation) Paro
15	FW	Fahamedul Islam	30 June 2006 (aged 20)	9	0	(Italian Football Federation) Sestri Levante
16	MF	Md Sohel Rana	1 June 1996 (aged 30)	24	0	(Bangladesh Football Federation) Mohammedan
17	MF	Sohel Rana	27 March 1995 (aged 31)	83	1	(Bangladesh Football Federation) Bashundhara Kings
18	GK	Sujon Hossain	5 August 1996 (aged 30)	1	0	(Bangladesh Football Federation) Mohammedan
19	DF	Zayyan Ahmed	29 January 2004 (aged 22)	10	0	(United Arab Emirates Football Association) Rimal Al-Sahra
20	FW	Farhaan Ali Wahid	9 December 2006 (aged 19)	2	1	(The Football Association) Boreham Wood
21	MF	Quazem Shah	25 October 1998 (aged 28)	8	0	(Bangladesh Football Federation) Bashundhara Kings
22	DF	Md Saad Uddin	1 September 1998 (aged 28)	52	2	(Bangladesh Football Federation) Mohammedan
23	MF	Shamit Shome	5 September 1997 (aged 29)	11	1	(United States Soccer Federation) New York Cosmos
24	DF	Abdullah Omar Sajib	17 October 2002 (aged 24)	0	0	(Bangladesh Football Federation) Dhaka Abahani
25	DF	Md Taj Uddin	5 January 2005 (aged 21)	4	0	(Bangladesh Football Federation) Dhaka Abahani
26	FW	Mahe Khan	2 November 2007 (aged 19)	0	0	(The Football Association) Moulton
27	FW	Mohammad Ibrahim	7 August 1997 (aged 29)	42	4	(Bangladesh Football Federation) Fortis
28	FW	Minhazul Karim Shadin	10 March 2002 (aged 24)	2	0	(Bangladesh Football Federation) Chattogram City

=== Bhutan ===
Bhutan named the following 23 players to the squad.

Head coach: (Australia) Gary Phillips

No.	Pos.	Player	Date of birth (age)	Caps	Goals	Club
1	GK	Lhocho Nima	25 February 2005 (aged 21)	1	0	(Bhutan Football Federation) Ugyen Academy
2	MF	Tandin Tshewang		0	0	(Bhutan Football Federation) BFF Academy
3	DF	Phuntsho Jigme	11 September 1997 (aged 29)	10	0	(Bhutan Football Federation) Drukpa
4	DF	Tenzin Norbu	8 May 2001 (aged 25)	17	1	(Football Australia) Balga SC
5	DF	Deychog Drakar Dorji		0	0	(Bhutan Football Federation) BFF Academy
6	MF	Jigman Seltob Dorji	13 January 2006 (aged 20)	7	0	(Bhutan Football Federation) Thimphu City
7	FW	Chencho Gyeltshen (captain)	10 May 1996 (aged 30)	49	15	(Bhutan Football Federation) Thimphu
8	MF	Pema Zangpo	24 March 2005 (aged 21)	10	0	(Bhutan Football Federation) Royal College
9	FW	Kinzang Tenzin	28 May 2005 (aged 21)	8	0	(Bhutan Football Federation) Royal College
10	MF	Orgyen Tshering	14 September 1999 (aged 27)	16	0	(Bhutan Football Federation) Thimphu City
11	FW	Kinga Wangchuk	19 September 2002 (aged 24)	19	1	(Bhutan Football Federation) Paro
12	DF	Kinley Penjor	2 April 2005 (aged 21)	3	0	(Bhutan Football Federation) Thimphu City
13	FW	Jigdrel Wangchuk	9 December 2002 (aged 23)	4	0	(Bhutan Football Federation) Royal College
14	FW	Dawa Tshering	21 August 1998 (aged 28)	23	1	(Bhutan Football Federation) Thimphu
15	FW	Nima Wangdi	6 December 1998 (aged 27)	34	2	(Bhutan Football Federation) Paro
16	MF	Tshelthrim Namgyel	1 July 2002 (aged 24)	20	1	(Bhutan Football Federation) Paro
17	MF	Jetsuen Dorji	4 August 2006 (aged 20)	9	0	(Bhutan Football Federation) Thimphu City
18	DF	Kinzang Tashi Tobden	3 February 2005 (aged 21)	4	0	(Bhutan Football Federation) Thimphu City
19	MF	Sonam Dorji		0	0	(Bhutan Football Federation) BFF Academy
20	GK	Gyeltshen Zangpo	6 July 1998 (aged 28)	6	0	(Bhutan Football Federation) Paro
21	GK	Dendup Namgyel	15 August 2002 (aged 24)	1	0	(Bhutan Football Federation) Royal College
22	DF	Jigme Tshultrim	17 February 2000 (aged 26)	1	0	(Bhutan Football Federation) Royal College
23	FW	Bikash Pradhan	21 January 2004 (aged 22)	11	0	(Bhutan Football Federation) Transport United

=== Sri Lanka ===
Sri Lanka named the following 28 players to the squad.

Head coach: (Kuwait) Abdullah Al Mutairi

No.	Pos.	Player	Date of birth (age)	Caps	Goals	Club
1	GK	Sujan Perera (captain)	18 July 1992 (aged 34)	66	0	(Bangladesh Football Federation) Fortis FC
2	DF	Anujan Rajendram	11 May 2000 (aged 26)	19	0	(Norwegian Football Federation) Vindbjart
3	DF	William Thomason	28 June 2002 (aged 24)	6	0	(Football Australia) Olympic
4	DF	Chalana Chameera	10 January 1993 (aged 33)	38	0	(Football Federation of Sri Lanka) Blue Star
5	FW	Mohammad Hasmeer	7 October 1999 (aged 27)	9	0	(Football Federation of Sri Lanka) Navy Sea Hawks
6	MF	Garrett Kelly	29 April 1996 (aged 30)	13	0	(Kyrgyz Football Union) Alay
7	FW	Wade Dekker	21 April 1994 (aged 32)	16	2	(Football Australia) Dandenong City
8	MF	Aman Faizer	12 March 1999 (aged 27)	24	0	(Football Federation of Sri Lanka) Renown
9	FW	Oliver Kelaart	16 April 1998 (aged 28)	23	3	(Football Australia) Altona Magic
10	MF	Dillon De Silva	18 April 2002 (aged 24)	29	5	(The Football Association) Oxford City
11	FW	Sam Durrant	25 October 2002 (aged 24)	19	0	(Cyprus Football Association) Karmiotissa
12	MF	Leon Perera	1 January 1997 (aged 29)	17	2	(German Football Association) Lüneburger Hansa
13	FW	Ahmed Waseem Razeek	13 September 1994 (aged 32)	35	12	Unattached
14	DF	Steven Sacayaradjy	22 January 1997 (aged 29)	12	0	(French Football Federation) Borgo
15	DF	Claudio Kammerknecht	26 July 1999 (aged 27)	12	1	(German Football Association) Waldhof Mannheim
16	MF	Geremi Perera	25 March 2004 (aged 22)	2	0	(German Football Association) Eltersdorf
17	MF	Niloshan Senthurvasan	10 March 2002 (aged 24)	8	1	(Norwegian Football Federation) Lillehammer
18	DF	Barath Suresh	11 June 2003 (aged 23)	17	1	(Football Australia) Langwarrin
19	MF	Muhammedhu Munsif	28 November 1999 (aged 26)	3	0	(Football Federation of Sri Lanka) YSSC
20	FW	Rahul Suresh	4 June 2004 (aged 22)	12	2	(Football Australia) Dandenong Thunder
21	MF	Adhavan Rajamohan	21 February 1993 (aged 33)	19	2	(Swedish Football Association) FC Järfälla
22	GK	Kaveesh Lakpriya Fernando	10 January 1995 (aged 31)	3	0	(Football Federation of Sri Lanka) Blue Star
23	DF	Jason Thayaparan	1 October 1995 (aged 31)	14	0	(German Football Association) Rot-Weiß Walldorf
24	GK	Mohamed Mursith	4 January 2001 (aged 25)	1	0	(Football Federation of Sri Lanka) Blue Star
25	DF	Ayman Zawahir	18 October 2007 (aged 19)	0	0	(Football Australia) Avondale
26	FW	Remiyan Muthuccumaru	19 April 2007 (aged 19)	2	0	(Royal Dutch Football Association) Emmen
27	DF	Jude Supan	30 July 1998 (aged 28)	30	0	(Football Federation of Sri Lanka) Up Country Lions
28	FW	Regize Canistan	25 October 1997 (aged 29)	1	0	(French Football Federation) Entente

== Group B ==
=== India ===
The All India Football Federation announced a second-string squad would participate. (Note: The first choice Indian national team was sent to participate in FIFA international friendly matches against New Zealand.) The following 28 players were named to the squad.

Head coach: Naushad Moosa

No.	Pos.	Player	Date of birth (age)	Caps	Goals	Club
1	GK	Priyansh Dubey	1 January 2004 (aged 22)	0	0	(All India Football Federation) Mohun Bagan
2	MF	Abhishek Suryavanshi	12 March 2001 (aged 25)	2	0	(All India Football Federation) Mohun Bagan
3	DF	Bijoy Varghese	14 March 2000 (aged 26)	6	0	(All India Football Federation) Punjab
4	DF	Chinglensana Singh Konsham	27 November 1996 (aged 29)	14	0	(All India Football Federation) Bengaluru
5	DF	Muhammad Uvais	10 December 1998 (aged 27)	5	0	(All India Football Federation) Punjab
6	DF	Abdul Rabeeh Anjukandan	23 January 2001 (aged 25)	0	0	(All India Football Federation) NorthEast United
7	FW	Suhail Ahmad Bhat	8 April 2005 (aged 21)	1	0	(All India Football Federation) Mohun Bagan
8	MF	Suresh Singh Wangjam	7 August 2000 (aged 26)	40	1	(All India Football Federation) Bengaluru
9	FW	Vishnu P. V.	24 December 2001 (aged 24)	0	0	(All India Football Federation) East Bengal
10	FW	Liston Colaco	12 November 1998 (aged 27)	34	1	(All India Football Federation) Mohun Bagan
11	FW	Muhammad Suhail	12 September 2006 (aged 20)	0	0	(All India Football Federation) Punjab
12	DF	Khaiminthang Lhungdim	1 January 2001 (aged 25)	1	0	(All India Football Federation) Punjab
13	GK	Mohanraj Kaithamalai	1 January 2004 (aged 22)	0	0	(All India Football Federation) NorthEast United
14	MF	Ricky Shabong	29 December 2002 (aged 23)	6	0	(All India Football Federation) Punjab
15	MF	Macarton Nickson	24 March 2002 (aged 24)	6	0	(All India Football Federation) NorthEast United
16	MF	Manglenthang Kipgen	1 January 2005 (aged 21)	0	0	(All India Football Federation) Punjab
17	MF	Noufal P.N.	20 December 2000 (aged 25)	1	0	(All India Football Federation) Mumbai City
18	MF	Nikhil Prabhu	2 October 2000 (aged 26)	8	0	(All India Football Federation) Punjab
19	DF	Ronney Willson Kharbudon	1 January 2005 (aged 21)	0	0	(All India Football Federation) Goa
20	MF	Farukh Choudhary	8 November 1996 (aged 29)	25	3	(All India Football Federation) Mumbai City
21	MF	Ebindas Yesudasan	19 April 2005 (aged 21)	0	0	(All India Football Federation) Kerala Blasters
22	MF	Adison Singh Thokchom	6 July 2004 (aged 22)	0	0	(All India Football Federation) Mohammedan
23	GK	Arsh Anwer Shaikh	9 July 2002 (aged 24)	0	0	(All India Football Federation) Kerala Blasters
24	DF	Hmingthanmawia Ralte	31 May 2000 (aged 26)	8	0	(All India Football Federation) Mumbai City
25	DF	Sandip Mandi	1 January 2002 (aged 24)	0	0	(All India Football Federation) East Bengal
26	MF	Brison Fernandes	17 April 2001 (aged 25)	3	0	(All India Football Federation) Chennaiyin
27	DF	Nathan Rodrigues	24 June 2004 (aged 22)	0	0	(All India Football Federation) Mumbai City
28	FW	Irfan Yadwad	19 June 2001 (aged 25)	7	0	(All India Football Federation) Chennaiyin

=== Maldives ===
Head coach: (Hungary) István Urbányi

No.	Pos.	Player	Date of birth (age)	Caps	Goals	Club
1	GK	Hussain Shareef	5 September 1998 (aged 28)	22	0	(Football Association of Maldives) Maziya S&RC
2	DF	Samooh Ali (captain)	5 July 1996 (aged 30)	57	1	(Football Association of Maldives) Maziya S&RC
4	DF	Hussain Sifaau	4 February 1996 (aged 30)	50	1	(Football Association of Maldives) Maziya S&RC
5	DF	Nassah Ibrahim	11 May 2007 (aged 19)	3	0	(Football Association of Maldives) Maziya S&RC
6	MF	Ali Hamdhaan	10 May 1997 (aged 29)	0	0	(Football Association of Maldives) Buru Sports Club
7	FW	Ali Fasir	4 September 1988 (aged 38)	91	18	(Football Association of Maldives) New Radiant
8	MF	Ibrahim Aisam	7 May 1997 (aged 29)	39	2	(Football Association of Maldives) Maziya S&RC
9	FW	Ethan Ibrahim Zaki	5 June 2002 (aged 24)	1	0	(Football Association of Maldives) New Radiant
10	FW	Ahmed Aiham	26 February 2003 (aged 23)	17	0	(Football Association of Maldives) Maziya S&RC
11	FW	Abdulla Looth	8 February 2005 (aged 21)	1	0	(Football Association of Maldives) Maziya S&RC
12	DF	Ahmed Aiham	23 March 1998 (aged 28)	10	0	(Football Association of Maldives) Odi Sports Club
13	FW	Mohamed Naim	7 October 1996 (aged 30)	19	1	(Football Association of Maldives) New Radiant
15	DF	Amdhan Ali	11 September 1992 (aged 34)	33	1	(Football Association of Maldives) New Radiant
16	MF	Ahzam Rasheed	18 September 2007 (aged 19)	5	0	(Football Association of Maldives) Odi Sports Club
17	FW	Ibrahim Mahudhee	22 August 1993 (aged 33)	56	5	(Football Association of Maldives) Maziya S&RC
18	GK	Mohammed Ashwaan	4 September 1997 (aged 29)	0	0	(Football Association of Maldives) Odi Sports Club
19	DF	Ahmed Maish Rasheed	11 July 2004 (aged 22)	3	0	(Football Association of Maldives) Victory Sports Club
20	DF	Hassan Eenaaz	12 June 2000 (aged 26)	6	0	(Football Association of Maldives) TC Sports Club
21	MF	Ibrahim Waheed Hassan	15 November 1995 (aged 30)	26	6	(Football Association of Maldives) Odi Sports Club
22	GK	Mohammed Shafeeu	22 July 1988 (aged 38)	0	0	(Football Association of Maldives) Victory
23	FW	Muzdhan Hassan	4 May 2006 (aged 20)	4	0	(Football Association of Maldives) Odi Sports Club
24	FW	Naiz Hassan	10 May 1996 (aged 30)	69	12	(Football Association of Maldives) Victory Sports Club
26	MF	Nisham Mohamed	31 January 1999 (aged 27)	6	0	(Football Association of Maldives) Maziya S&RC

=== Pakistan ===
Pakistan named the following 28 players to the squad.

Head coach: (Peru) Nolberto Solano

No.	Pos.	Player	Date of birth (age)	Caps	Goals	Club
1	GK	Yousuf Butt	18 October 1989 (aged 37)	36	0	(Danish Football Association) Ishøj IF
2	MF	Tufail Shinwari	10 May 2006 (aged 20)	3	0	(Pakistan Football Federation) Karachi United
3	DF	Mohib Ullah	23 May 2005 (aged 21)	12	1	(Bhutan Football Federation) Paro
4	DF	Abdullah Iqbal (captain)	27 July 2002 (aged 24)	24	0	(Swedish Football Association) Mjällby AIF
5	DF	Easah Suliman	26 January 1998 (aged 28)	13	0	(Association of Football Federations of Azerbaijan) Sumgayit
6	FW	Najeeb Ullah Khan	2 August 2007 (aged 19)	0	0	(Pakistan Football Federation) Khan Research Laboratories
7	FW	Kaleemullah Khan	20 September 1992 (aged 34)	29	5	(Pakistan Football Federation) Abdul FC
8	FW	Abdul Arshad	26 February 2003 (aged 23)	17	2	(Danish Football Association) Kolding IF
9	MF	Hayyaan Khattak	6 October 2003 (aged 23)	7	0	(Pakistan Football Federation) POPO FC
10	MF	Alamgir Ghazi	9 May 2001 (aged 25)	25	0	(Pakistan Football Federation) WAPDA
11	FW	Shayak Dost	1 May 2002 (aged 24)	23	2	(Bangladesh Football Federation) City Club
12	DF	Mamoon Moosa Khan	28 November 2000 (aged 25)	12	0	(Bhutan Football Federation) Paro
13	FW	Ali Khan	16 March 2001 (aged 25)	3	1	(Swedish Football Association) Vasalunds IF
14	DF	Abdul Rehman	25 February 2008 (aged 18)	4	0	(Pakistan Football Federation) POPO FC
15	FW	Umar Nawaz	28 September 2007 (aged 19)	6	2	(Football Association of Finland) Kajaanin Haka
16	FW	Syed Ali Raza	6 August 2004 (aged 22)	3	0	(Bangladesh Football Federation) Brothers Union
17	FW	McKeal Abdullah	7 July 2005 (aged 21)	6	0	(The Football Association) Ilkeston Town
18	DF	Junaid Shah	23 March 2003 (aged 23)	8	0	(Pakistan Football Federation) SA Gardens
19	MF	Ali Uzair	14 October 1996 (aged 30)	24	0	(Bangladesh Football Federation) Brothers Union
20	GK	Saqib Hanif	23 April 1994 (aged 32)	11	0	(Football Association of Maldives) New Radiant
21	DF	Haris Zeb	15 May 2001 (aged 25)	9	0	(New Zealand Football) South Island United
22	GK	Hassan Ali	23 February 2003 (aged 23)	0	0	(Pakistan Football Federation) WAPDA
23	DF	Ali Khan Niazi	14 December 2000 (aged 25)	6	0	(Pakistan Football Federation) SA Gardens
24	MF	Zain ul Abideen Ishaque	25 May 1998 (aged 28)	2	0	(Pakistan Football Federation) Karachi United
25	MF	Muhammad Junaid		0	0	(Pakistan Football Federation) WAPDA
26	DF	Waqar Baloch	2 March 1996 (aged 30)	6	0	(Pakistan Football Federation) Khan Research Laboratories
27	DF	Haseeb Khan	4 April 2000 (aged 26)	6	0	(Pakistan Football Federation) Pakistan Air Force
28	MF	Adil Nabi	28 February 1994 (aged 32)	3	0	(Hellenic Football Federation) Panachaiki
