= 2026 SAFF Championship final =

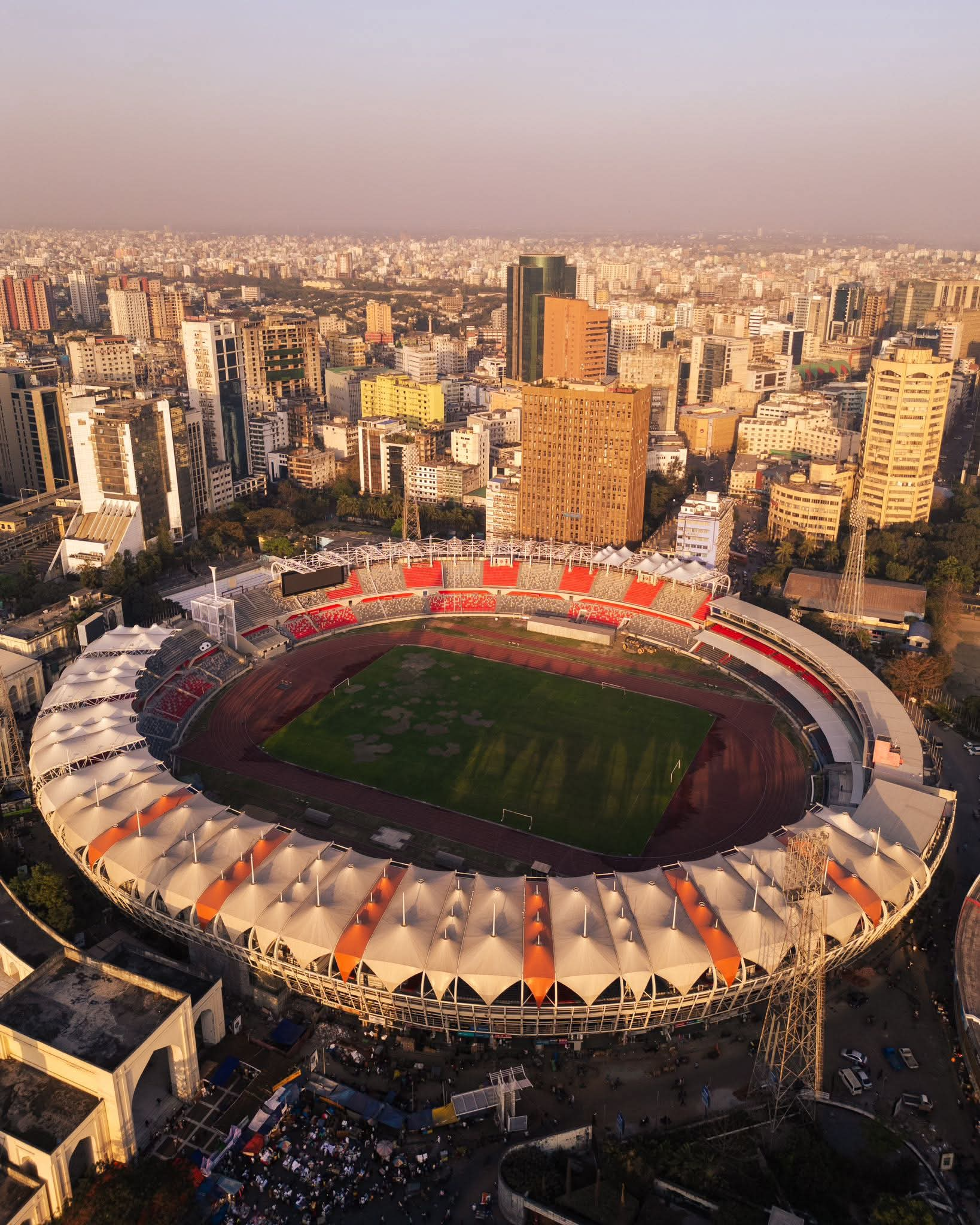
- The National Stadium hosted the match.
- Event: 2026 SAFF Championship
India	Pakistan
2	1
- Date: 17 November 2026
- Venue: National Stadium, Dhaka
- Man of the Match: Sandip Mandi (India)
- Referee: Mohammed Khalfan Al Manai (Oman)
- Attendance: 9,348
- Weather: Mostly cloudy 22 °C (72 °F); 69% humidity

The 2026 SAFF Championship final was a football match which determined the winner of the 2026 SAFF Championship, the 15th edition of the SAFF Championship, a biennial tournament contested by the men's national teams of the member associations of the South Asian Football Federation. The match was held at the Dhaka Stadium in Dhaka, Bangladesh, on 17 November 2026 between first-time finalists Pakistan and the defending champions India.

In the final, India defeated Pakistan 2–1 to win a record-extending tenth title.

== Teams ==
Team	Previous annual championship finals (bold indicates winners)
India	11 (1995, **1997**, **1999**, **2005**, **2009** (Note: India won in 2009 Championship was won by India U-23 team.), **2011**, 2013, **2015**, 2018, **2021** and **2023**.
Pakistan	0 (Debut)

== Venue ==
On 21 July 2026, it was announced that the matches during the tournament, including the final, would take place at the National Stadium in Dhaka, Bangladesh.

Dhaka	Location of venue in Bangladesh
National Stadium	Location of venue in Bangladesh
23°44′7.8″N 90°24′40.7″E	Location of venue in Bangladesh
Capacity: **22,400**	Location of venue in Bangladesh
National Stadium	Location of venue in Bangladesh

== Route to the final ==
=== India ===
Defending champions India brought a second-string squad coached by Naushad Moosa to Dhaka while the senior team played friendlies in New Zealand. Drawn into Group B with Maldives and Pakistan, India played against Pakistan at the National Stadium in their opening match. Goals from Suhail Ahmad Bhat and Manglenthang Kipgen put India up 3–0 before Pakistan scored twice in stoppage time, leaving India with a 3–2 win. In the last group match they beat the Maldives 1–0 on a 38th-minute penalty by Bhat to top Group B with six points.

In the semi-finals on 14 November, India met Group A runners-up Bhutan. Early goals from Vishnu P. V. and captain Chinglensana Singh put India ahead before Bhutan pulled one back after half-time. India held on for a 2–1 win to reach their fourteenth SAFF Championship final and fourth straight title match.

=== Pakistan ===
Pakistan, coached by Nolberto Solano and entering as the lowest-ranked team in the tournament at 198th in the FIFA Men's World Ranking, opened the proceedings with a 2–3 loss to India despite stoppage-time goals from Najeeb Ullah Khan and Alamgir Ghazi after being 0–3 down at half-time. Needing a win to stay alive, Pakistan beat the Maldives 3–0 in their penultimate group stage match thanks to an early penalty from McKeal Abdullah and two first-half goals from Najeeb, finishing second in Group B on three points.

In the semi-finals, they played Group A winners and hosts Bangladesh in front of 21,983 fans at the National Stadium. Substitute Abdul Arshad scored in the 86th minute to give Pakistanis a 1–0 win and put them into their first senior SAFF Championship final.

India (Note: The All India Football Federation (AIFF) announced a second-string squad would participate. The first choice Indian national team was sent to participate in FIFA international friendly matches against New Zealand.)
Round
Pakistan
Opponent
Result
Group stage
Opponent
Result
Pakistan
3–2
Match 1
India
2–3
Maldives
1–0
Match 2
Maldives
3–0

Pos	Team	Pld	Pts
**1**	India	**2**	**6**
2	Pakistan	2	**3**
3	Maldives	2	**0**

Source: SAFF
Final standings

Pos	Team	Pld	Pts
1	India	2	**6**
**2**	Pakistan	**2**	**3**
3	Maldives	2	**0**

Source: SAFF
Opponent
Result
Knockout stage
Opponent
Result
Bhutan
2–1
Semi-finals
Bangladesh
1–0

== Match ==
17 November 2026
20:30

India	2–1	Pakistan
Bhat 61'; Mandi 88'	SAFF	Ghazi 45+1'

National Stadium, Dhaka
Attendance: 9,348
Referee: Mohammed Khalfan Al Manai (Oman)

**India**	**Pakistan**

GK	23	Arsh Anwer Shaikh
RB	12	Khaiminthang Lhungdim
CB	4	Chinglensana Singh Konsham (c)
CB	18	Nikhil Prabhu
LB	25	Sandip Mandi (yellow card) 88'
CDM	14	Ricky Shabong
CM	2	Abhishek Suryavanshi
RW	9	Vishnu Puthiya Valappil (substituted off) 72'
CAM	26	Brison Fernandes (substituted off) 72'
LW	16	Manglenthang Kipgen (substituted off) 46'
CF	7	Suhail Ahmad Bhat (substituted off) 90+2'
Substitutes:
GK	1	Priyansh Dubey
DF	5	Muhammad Uvais
RWB	6	Abdul Rabeeh (substituted on) 72'
GK	13	Mohanraj Kaithamalai
LW	15	Macarton Nickson (substituted on) 46'
CAM	21	Ebindas Yesudasan (substituted on) 90+2'
MF	22	Adison Singh Thokchom
DF	27	Nathan Rodrigues
CF	28	Irfan Yadwad (substituted on) 72'
Head Coach:
Naushad Moosa

GK	1	Yousuf Butt
RWB	21	Haris Zeb
CB	4	Abdullah Iqbal (c)
CB	3	Mohib Ullah (substituted off) 90+1'
CB	5	Easah Suliman (yellow card) 90+5'
LWB	18	Junaid Shah (red card) 60'
CM	10	Alamgir Ghazi (substituted off) 63'
CM	28	Adil Nabi (substituted off) 90+1'
RW	8	Abdul Arshad
LW	13	Muhammad Ali (substituted off) 90+4'
CF	17	McKeal Abdullah (substituted off) 63'
Substitutes:
MF	2	Tufail Khan
CF	6	Najeeb Ullah (substituted on) 90+1'
CM	9	Hayyaan Khattak (substituted on) 90+1'
LW	11	Shayak Dost (substituted on) 90+4'
DF	12	Mamoon Moosa Khan
FW	15	Umar Nawaz
CM	19	Ali Uzair Mahmood (substituted on) 63'
GK	20	Saqib Hanif
GK	22	Hassan Ali
DF	23	Ali Khan Niazi
MF	25	Muhammad Junaid
LWB	27	Haseeb Ahmed Khan (substituted on) 63'
Head Coach:
(Peru) Nolberto Solano

Man of the Match:
Sandip Mandi (India)

Assistant referees:
Kilar Ladsavong (Laos)
Nurhadi Sulchan (Indonesia)
Fourth official:
Thoriq Alkatiri (Indonesia)
Reserve assistant referee:
Ngô Duy Lân (Vietnam)
Video assistant referee:
Sivakorn Pu-udom (Thailand)
Assistant video assistant referee:
Muhammad Taqi (Singapore)
Referee assessor:
Preecha Kangram (Thailand)
Match commissioner:
Mindu Dorji (Bhutan)

**Match rules**

- 90 minutes
- 30 minutes of extra time if necessary
- Penalty shoot-out if scores still level
- Maximum of fifteen named substitutes
- Maximum of five substitutions, with a sixth allowed in extra time
- Maximum of three substitution opportunities, with a fourth allowed in extra time
- Maximum of one concussion substitution, granting the opposition an additional standalone substitution

== See also ==
- 2026 SAFF Women's Championship final
- 2026–27 in Indian football
