= India national football B team =

Secondary Indian football team

India B
- Nickname: India XI
- Association: AIFF
- Confederation: AFC
- Sub-confederation: SAFF (South Asia)
| First colours | Second colours |

First international
- India B 2–2 Jilin (China) (Dhaka, Bangladesh; 26 August 1983)
Medal record
SAFF Championship
| Gold medal – first place | 2026 Bangladesh | Team |

The India national football B team is a secondary football team run occasionally as support for the India national football team.

== History ==
The team played their first matches in the third edition of the Bangladesh President's Gold Cup. The event was held at the Dhaka Stadium in Dhaka, Bangladesh. In 1998 Indian team played in the Bristol Freedom Cup tournament hosted by Sri Lanka. The team defeated the hosts 3–2 in the final after extra time to win the title.

India entered the 2026 SAFF Championship with a secondary-string squad after the main squad was sent to play FIFA 'A' international friendlies against New Zealand. Drawn into Group B with Maldives and Pakistan, India played against Pakistan at the National Stadium in their opening match. Goals from Suhail Ahmad Bhat and Manglenthang Kipgen put India up 3–0 before Pakistan scored twice in stoppage time, leaving India with a 3–2 win. In the last group match they beat the Maldives 1–0 on a first-half penalty by Bhat to top Group B with six points.

In the semi-finals, India met Group A runners-up Bhutan. Early goals from Vishnu P. V. and captain Chinglensana Singh put India ahead before Bhutan pulled one back after half-time. India held on for a 2–1 win to reach their fourteenth SAFF Championship final and fourth straight title match.

In the final, India defeated Pakistan 2–1 to win a record-extending tenth title in SAFF Championship and first official title by the B team.

== Results and fixtures ==
=== 2026 ===
| 5 November 2026 SAFF Championship Group B | India B | 3–2 | Pakistan | Dhaka, Bangladesh |
| 15:00 IST | Suhail 13', 19'; Kipgen 32' | SAFF; FIFA | Najeeb 90+1'; Ghazi 90+4' | Stadium: National Stadium; Attendance: 2,300; Referee: Ngô Duy Lân (Vietnam) |

| 11 November 2026 SAFF Championship Group B | Maldives | 0–1 | India B | Dhaka, Bangladesh |
| 15:00 IST | | SAFF; FIFA | Suhail 38' (pen.) | Stadium: National Stadium; Attendance: 1,969; Referee: Mohammed Khalfan Al Manai (Oman) |

| 14 November 2026 SAFF Championship Semi-finals | India B | 2–1 | Bhutan | Dhaka, Bangladesh |
| 15:00 IST | Vishnu 8'; Konsham 27' | Report | Tobden 48' | Stadium: National Stadium; Attendance: 1,700; Referee: Thoriq Alkatiri (Indonesia) |

| 17 November 2026 SAFF Championship Final | India B | 2–1 | Pakistan | Dhaka, Bangladesh |
| 20:00 IST | Bhat 61'; Mandi 88' | Report | Ghazi 45+1' | Stadium: National Stadium; Attendance: 9,348; Referee: Mohammed Khalfan Al Manai (Oman) |

== Coaching staff ==
The current coaching staff of the team are:

| Position | Name |
|---|---|
| Head coach | (India) Naushad Moosa |
| Assistant coach | (India) Bibiano Fernandes |
| Goalkeeping coach | (India) Parshuram Salwadi |
| Strength and conditioning coach | (India) Saifulla |

== Players ==
The following 28 players were called up for the 2026 SAFF Championship in November 2026.

Caps and goals are correct as of 11 November 2026, after the match against Maldives.

| No. | Pos. | Player | Date of birth (age) | Caps | Goals | Club |
|---|---|---|---|---|---|---|
| | GK | Mohanraj Kaithamalai | 24 June 2004 (age 22) | 0 | 0 | (All India Football Federation) North East United |
| | GK | Priyansh Dubey | 22 July 2006 (age 20) | 0 | 0 | (All India Football Federation) Mohun Bagan |
| | GK | Arsh Anwer Shaikh | 9 August 2002 (age 24) | 0 | 0 | (All India Football Federation) Kerala Blasters |
| | DF | Abdul Rabeeh | 23 January 2001 (age 25) | 0 | 0 | (All India Football Federation) North East United |
| | DF | Chinglensana Singh Konsham | 27 November 1996 (age 29) | 0 | 0 | (All India Football Federation) Bengaluru |
| | DF | Khaiminthang Lhungdim | 7 May 2000 (age 26) | 0 | 0 | (All India Football Federation) Punjab |
| | DF | Muhammad Uvais | 31 July 1998 (age 28) | 0 | 0 | (All India Football Federation) Punjab |
| | DF | Nathan Rodrigues | 2 February 2004 (age 22) | 0 | 0 | (All India Football Federation) Mumbai City |
| | DF | Sandip Mandi | 11 June 2002 (age 24) | 0 | 0 | (All India Football Federation) East Bengal |
| | MF | Abhishek Suryavanshi | 12 March 2001 (age 25) | 0 | 0 | (All India Football Federation) Mohun Bagan |
| | MF | Adison Singh Thokchom | 6 July 2004 (age 22) | 0 | 0 | (All India Football Federation) Mohammedan |
| | MF | Brison Fernandes | 17 April 2001 (age 25) | 0 | 0 | (All India Football Federation) Chennaiyin |
| | MF | Ebindas Yesudasan | 19 April 2005 (age 21) | 0 | 0 | (All India Football Federation) Kerala Blasters |
| | MF | Macarton Nickson | 3 June 2005 (age 21) | 0 | 0 | (All India Football Federation) NorthEast United |
| | MF | Manglenthang Kipgen | 3 June 2005 (age 21) | 0 | 0 | (All India Football Federation) Punjab |
| | MF | Nikhil Prabhu | 2 October 2000 (age 26) | 0 | 0 | (All India Football Federation) Punjab |
| | MF | Ricky Shabong | 29 December 2002 (age 23) | 0 | 0 | (All India Football Federation) Punjab |
| | FW | Irfan Yadwad | 19 June 2001 (age 25) | 0 | 0 | (All India Football Federation) Chennaiyin |
| | FW | Vishnu P. V. | 24 December 2001 (age 24) | 0 | 0 | (All India Football Federation) East Bengal |
| | FW | Suhail Ahmad Bhat | 8 April 2005 (age 21) | 0 | 0 | (All India Football Federation) Mohun Bagan |

=== Recent callups ===
The following footballers were part of national selection in the past twelve months, but are not part of the current call-up.

| Pos. | Player | Date of birth (age) | Caps | Goals | Club | Latest call-up |
|---|---|---|---|---|---|---|
| DF | Bijoy Varghese | 14 March 2000 (age 26) | 0 | 0 | (India) Punjab | 2026 SAFF Championship^{WD} |
| DF | Hmingthanmawia Ralte | 31 May 2000 (age 26) | 0 | 0 | (India) Mumbai City | 2026 SAFF Championship^{WD} |
| DF | Ronney Kharbudon | 2 March 2003 (age 23) | 0 | 0 | (India) Goa | 2026 SAFF Championship^{INJ} |
| MF | Farukh Choudhary | 8 November 1996 (age 30) | 0 | 0 | (India) Chennaiyin | 2026 SAFF Championship^{WD} |
| MF | Noufal P. N. | 30 October 2000 (age 26) | 0 | 0 | (India) Mumbai City | 2026 SAFF Championship^{WD} |
| MF | Suresh Singh Wangjam | 7 August 2000 (age 26) | 0 | 0 | (India) Bengaluru | 2026 SAFF Championship^{INJ} |
| FW | Muhammad Suhail F | 12 September 2006 (age 20) | 0 | 0 | (India) Punjab | 2026 SAFF Championship^{WD} |
| FW | Liston Colaco | 12 November 1998 (age 28) | 0 | 0 | (India) Mohun Bagan | 2026 SAFF Championship^{WD} |
^{INJ} Withdrew due to injury; ^{PRE} Preliminary squad / standby; ^{WD} Player withdrew from squad due to non-injury issue

== Competitive record ==
=== SAFF Championship ===
SAFF Championship record
| Year | Result | GP | W | D | L | GF | GA |
|---|---|---|---|---|---|---|---|
| 2026 | Champions | 4 | 4 | 0 | 0 | 8 | 4 |

== See also ==
- Football in India
  - India national football team
- Youth Teams
  - India national under-23 football team
  - India national under-20 football team
  - India national under-17 football team
