= Sub-continental football championships in Asia =

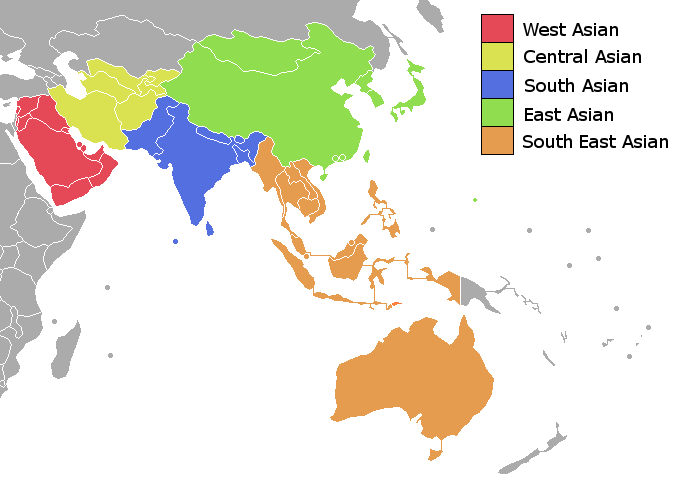
AFC regional federations

There are five association football sub-continental championships for national team from each sub-continental federation contested every two, three or four years. The governing bodies of five sub-continental confederations are all members of AFC and ultimately part of FIFA, the international association of football governing body.

== Men's national team championships ==
Region	Sub-Confederation	Championship	Founded	Teams	Most titles
East Asia	EAFF	EAFF Championship	2003	10	South Korea (5)
Southeast Asia	AFF	ASEAN Championship	1996	12	Thailand (7)
Central Asia	CAFA	CAFA Nations Cup	2023	6	Iran (1); Uzbekistan (1)
South Asia	SAFF	SAFF Championship	1993	7	India (10)
West Asia	WAFF	WAFF Championship	2000	12	Iran (4)

List of sub-continental champions
Year	SAFF	AFF	EAFF	WAFF	CAFA
1993	India				
1994					
1995	Sri Lanka				
1996		Thailand			
1997	India				
1998		Singapore			
1999	India				
2000		Thailand		Iran	
2001					
2002		Thailand		Iraq	
2003	Bangladesh		South Korea		
2004		Singapore		Iran	
2005	India		China		
2006					
2007		Singapore		Iran	
2008	Maldives	Vietnam	South Korea	Iran	
2009	India				
2010		Malaysia	China	Kuwait	
2011	India				
2012		Singapore		Syria	
2013	Afghanistan		Japan		
2014		Thailand		Qatar	
2015	India		South Korea		
2016		Thailand			
2017			South Korea		
2018	Maldives	Vietnam			
2019			South Korea	Bahrain	
2020		Thailand			
2021	India				
2022		Thailand	Japan		
2023	India				Iran
2024		Vietnam			
2025			Japan		Uzbekistan
2026	India			TBD	

== Men's club championships ==
Region	Sub-Confederation	Championship	Founded	Teams	Most titles
East Asia	EAFF	Marianas Club Championship	2023	2	(Northern Mariana Islands) Eleven Tiger (1)
Southeast Asia	AFF	ASEAN Club Championship	2003	12	(Thailand) Buriram United (2)
Southeast Asia	AFF	Mekong Club Championship	2014	4	(Thailand) Buriam United (2)
South Asia	SAFF	SAFF Club Championship	2026	8	–
Central Asia	CAFA	CAFA Silk Way Cup	2026	10	–
West Asia	WAFF	WAFF Club Championship	proposed	–	–

== Women's national team championships ==
Continent	Confederation	Championship	Founded	Teams	Most titles
East Asia	EAFF	EAFF Women's Championship	2005	10	Japan (4)
South East Asia	AFF	ASEAN Women's Championship	2004	11	Thailand (4)
South Asia	SAFF	SAFF Women's Championship	2010	7	India (6)
West Asia	WAFF	WAFF Women's Championship	2005	10	Jordan (6)
Central Asia	CAFA	CAFA Women's Championship	2018	6	Uzbekistan (2)

List of sub-continental champions
Year	AFF	EAFF	WAFF	SAFF	CAFA
2004	Myanmar				
2005		South Korea	Jordan		
2006	Vietnam				
2007	Myanmar		Jordan		
2008	Australia	Japan			
2009					
2010		Japan	United Arab Emirates	India	
2011	Thailand		United Arab Emirates		
2012	Vietnam			India	
2013	Japan	North Korea			
2014			Jordan	India	
2015	Thailand	North Korea			
2016	Thailand			India	
2017		North Korea			
2018	Thailand				Uzbekistan
2019	Vietnam	Japan	Jordan	India	
2020					
2021					
2022	Philippines	Japan	Jordan	Bangladesh	Uzbekistan
2023					
2024			Jordan	Bangladesh	
2025	Australia	South Korea			
2026				India	

== Women's club championships ==
Region	Sub-Confederation	Championship	Founded	Teams	Most titles
West Asia	WAFF	WAFF Women's Clubs Championship	2019	4	(Jordan) Shabab Al-Ordon (1) (Lebanon) Safa (1)
South Asia	SAFF	SAFF Club Women's Championship	2025	5	(India) East Bengal (1)

== See also ==
- Continental football championships
- Timeline of association football
- Domestic football champions
