= Farhaan Ali Wahid =

Bangladeshi footballer (born 2006)

Personal information
- Full name: Farhaan Ali Wahid
- Date of birth: 9 December 2006 (age 19)
- Place of birth: London, England
- Height: 5 ft 5 in (1.65 m)
- Position: Left winger

Team information
- Current team: Boreham Wood (on loan from Fulham)
- Number: 20

Youth career
- –2019: Chelsea
- 2019–: Fulham

Senior career*
Years	Team	Apps	(Gls)
2025–	Fulham	0	(0)
2026–	→ Boreham Wood (loan)	4	(0)

International career^{‡}
2026–	Bangladesh	3	(2)
- * Club domestic league appearances and goals as of 12 September 2026 ‡ National team caps and goals as of 11 November 2026

Farhaan Ali Wahid (Bengali: ফারহান আলী ওয়াহিদ; born 9 December 2006) is a footballer who plays as a left winger for National League club Boreham Wood, on loan from Premier League club Fulham. Born in England, he plays for the Bangladesh national team.

== Early life ==
Farhaan was born and raised in England and is of Bangladeshi descent. Through his parents, his roots are anchored in Sylhet.

Farhaan joined Fulham's youth ranks at Under-12s level. While playing for the club's U21 side, he was crowned the 2025–26 Professional U21 Development League's player of the month in November 2025. In the following year, he was shortlisted for the Player of the Season award after scoring 6 goals and 9 assists throughout the season.

== Club career ==
Farhaan signed his first professional contract with Fulham in 2025. During Fulham's pre-season, he made his senior debut against Norwich City and played against Al-Ahli SFC and SC Farense. In August 2026, he joined Boreham Wood of the National League on a season-long loan from the club. Farhaan made his debut with a goal and an assist in a 5–2 National League Cup victory over Leeds United Under-21s.

== International career ==
Due to his Bangladeshi heritage, he is eligible to represent Bangladesh internationally, in addition to England. In 2026, he opted to represent Bangladesh. He made his international debut for Bangladesh against Malaysia in the FIFA ASEAN Cup on 25 September 2026. He scored his debut goal in the match against Indonesia on 1 October 2026, which ended in a defeat for Bangladesh with a score of 2–9.

== Career statistics ==
=== International ===
As of 11 November 2026

Appearances and goals by national team and year
National team	Year	Apps	Goals
Bangladesh
Bangladesh	2026	3	2
Total		3	2

As of match played 11 November 2026
Scores and results list Bangladesh's goal tally first, score column indicates score after each Wahid goal.

List of international goals scored by Farhan Ali Wahid
No.	Date	Venue	Opponent	Score	Result	Competition
1.	1 October 2026	Gelora Bung Karno Stadium, Jakarta, Indonesia	Indonesia	2–7	2–9	2026 FIFA ASEAN Cup
2.	11 November 2026	National Stadium, Dhaka, Bangladesh	Sri Lanka	3–0	4–0	2026 SAFF Championship
