= Chinglensana Singh Konsham =

Indian footballer (born 1996)

Chinglensana Singh
Personal information
- Full name: Chinglensana Singh Konsham
- Date of birth: 27 November 1996 (age 29)
- Place of birth: Churachandpur, Manipur, India
- Height: 1.86 m (6 ft 1 in)
- Position: Centre-back

Team information
- Current team: Bengaluru
- Number: 3

Youth career
- 2010–2011: Mahindra United
- 2011–2012: Air India
- 2012–2015: TFA
- 2015–2016: Shillong Lajong

Senior career*
Years	Team	Apps	(Gls)
2015–2017	Shillong Lajong	32	(2)
2016	→ Delhi Dynamos (loan)	12	(0)
2017–2020	Goa	19	(0)
2020–2024	Hyderabad	63	(2)
2024–	Bengaluru	2	(0)

International career^{‡}
2013	India U19	1	(0)
2021–	India	14	(0)
Medal record
Men's football
Representing India
SAFF Championship
Winner	2021 Maldives
Winner	2026 Bangladesh
CAFA Nations Cup
Third place	2025 Tajikistan–Uzbekistan	Team
- * Club domestic league appearances and goals as of 16:30, 7 February 2024 (UTC) ‡ National team caps and goals as of 17 November 2026 (UTC)

Chinglensana Singh Konsham (Meitei: Konsham Chinglensana Singh, born 27 November 1996), known as Sana Singh, is an Indian professional footballer who plays as a centre-back for Indian Super League club Bengaluru and the India national team.

== Club career ==
Born in Manipur to a Meitei family, Sana started to play football from the age of seven. He started his career in the youth setup of Mahindra United, where he was a part of the team that won the Manchester United Premier Cup in 2010. He also played for the Air India under-15 side for a spell. In 2012, he joined the Tata Football Academy where he played for their under-17 and under-19 sides. While with Tata, Singh helped the academy win the I-League U19 in 2014. Singh also went on exposure tours to Sheffield, England, where he played for the Sheffield United under-18 side.

=== Shillong Lajong ===
In August 2015, Sana joined Shillong Lajong. On 4 January 2016 it was announced that Singh signed professional terms with Shillong Lajong in the I-League. He made his professional debut for the side on 10 January 2016 in the club's opening match of the season against Mumbai. He played the full match as Shillong Lajong drew 0–0.

=== Delhi Dynamos (loan) ===
Delhi Dynamos announced that they had signed Sana along with his club team-mate Rupert Nongrum on loan from Shillong Lajong for the 2016 Indian Super League season. Under coach Gianluca Zambrotta, Sanna featured in a total of 12 games for the Dynamos, playing the majority of the time in his preferred position at center back.

=== Goa ===
Sana was predominantly a squad player at Goa in the Indian Super League under Lobera, where he featured for the team 19 times over the course of 3 seasons.

=== Hyderabad ===
On 5 September 2020, Sana penned a two-year deal with Hyderabad. He played a crucial role and helped the team winning 2021–22 Indian Super League.

== International career ==
Sana has represented India at the under-19 level.

On July 24, 2016, it was announced that Sana had been called for an India National Team preparatory camp along with his Shillong Lajong teammate Isaac. Sanna made it to the 20 man India National team squad to play an unofficial friendly against Bhutan on August 13, 2017. Sana was featured in the game against Bhutan coming on as a 47th-minute substitute for Dhanpal Ganesh. He was also an unused substitute when India took on Puerto Rico in a FIFA Friendly in Mumbai on September 3, 2017.

On 2 March 2021, Sana got selected for the 35-man-squad national camp ahead of India national team's friendlies against Oman and UAE. On 25 March 2021, Sana made his international debut for India against Oman, which ended on a 1–1 draw.

== Personal life ==
During the 2023 Manipur unrest, Sana's home was torched, vandalized, and looted in Churachandpur. A football pitch that he built nearby, too, was destroyed due to the riots. He and his family moved to Moirang, his uncle's home, where they took refuge. He pulled out of the Indian football team camp in Bhubaneswar ahead of the 2023 Intercontinental Cup for this reason.

He is in a relationship with the Indian footballer Sweety Devi Ngangbam.

== Career statistics ==
=== Club ===
As of match played 6 November 2026

Appearances and goals by club, season and competition
Club	Season	League			National cup (Note: Includes Federation Cup, Super Cup)		Other		Total	
Club	Season	Division	Apps	Goals	Apps	Goals	Apps	Goals	Apps	Goals
Shillong Lajong	2015–16	I-League	14	1	4	1	—		18	2
Shillong Lajong	2016–17	I-League	18	1	3	0	—		21	1
Shillong Lajong	Total		32	2	7	1	0	0	39	3
Delhi Dynamos (loan)	2016	Indian Super League	12	0	0	0	—		12	0
Goa	2017–18	Indian Super League	10	0	0	0	—		10	0
Goa	2018–19	Indian Super League	7	0	1	0	—		8	0
Goa	2019–20	Indian Super League	2	0	0	0	—		2	0
Goa	Total		19	0	1	0	0	0	20	0
Hyderabad	2020–21	Indian Super League	18	0	—		—		18	0
Hyderabad	2021–22	Indian Super League	21	1	—		—		21	1
Hyderabad	2022–23	Indian Super League	14	1	3	0	6 (Note: Five appearances in Durand Cup, one appearance in play-offs for AFC Cup)	0	23	1
Hyderabad	2023–24	Indian Super League	10	0	0	0	3 (Note: Appearances in Durand Cup)	1	13	1
Hyderabad	Total		63	2	3	0	9	1	75	3
Bengaluru	2023–24	Indian Super League	9	0	0	0	—		9	0
Bengaluru	2024–25	Indian Super League	25	0	1	0	5 (Note: Appearances in Durand Cup)	0	31	0
Bengaluru	2025–26	Indian Super League	13	0	2	0	—		15	0
Bengaluru	2026–27	Indian Super League	4	0	0	0	—		4	0
Bengaluru	Total		51	0	3	0	5	0	59	0
Career total			177	4	14	1	14	1	205	6

=== International ===
As of 17 November 2026

National team	Year	Apps	Goals
India	2016	1	0
India	2021	8	0
India	2022	1	0
India	2023	1	0
India	2024	1	0
India	2025	2	0
India	2026	3	1
Total		17	1

As of match played 17 November 2026
India score listed first, score column indicates score after each Chinglensana Singh goal

List of international goals scored by Chinglensana Singh
No.	Date	Venue	Cap	Opponent	Score	Result	Competition
1	14 November 2026	National Stadium, Dhaka, Bangladesh	16	Bhutan	2–0	2–1	2026 SAFF Championship

== Honours ==
FC Goa

- Indian Super Cup: 2019

Hyderabad

- Indian Super League: 2021–22

India

- SAFF Championship: 2021, 2026
- Tri-Nation Series: 2023
