= Nathan Rodrigues =

Indian footballer (born 2004)

Personal information
- Full name: Nathan Asher Rodrigues
- Date of birth: 2 February 2004 (age 22)
- Place of birth: Arambol, Goa, India
- Height: 1.75 m (5 ft 9 in)
- Position: Left back

Team information
- Current team: Mumbai City

Youth career
- 2015–2019: Churchil Brothers
- 2019–2023: RF Young Champs
- 2023–2024: Mumbai City

Senior career*
Years	Team	Apps	(Gls)
2023–	Mumbai City	20	(3)
- * Club domestic league appearances and goals as of 16:00, 1 March 2025 (UTC)

Nathan Asher Rodrigues (born 2 February 2004) is an Indian professional footballer who plays as a left back for Indian Super League club Mumbai City.

== Youth career ==
Born in Arambol, Goa, Nathan began his career with Goan club Churchill Brothers's U-16 team, playing until 2019 before leaving the club to join RF Young Champs on a free transfer.

Nathan was signed to the RF Young Champs team in 2019 at 15 years old, playing for RFYC in the Reliance Foundation Development League (RFDL) for four years. Once a midfielder at Churchill, Nathan transitioned into playing in defence with the help of his coaches at RF Young Champs.

Speaking about his time at RF Young Champs, Nathan said that he "learnt the importance of working on his own", and the need to work on his strengths and weaknesses to improve as a footballer.

Nathan was scouted by Mumbai City FC from his time playing in the RFDL, and ended up signing his first senior contract with the Islanders in 2023.

== Club career ==
=== Mumbai City ===
==== 2023–24 season ====
On 8 July 2023, Nathan signed for retaining ISL shield winners Mumbai City FC on a four-year deal, until the end of the 2026–27 season. He made his debut for the club in the 2023 Durand Cup against the Indian Navy Football Team, coming on as a substitute. He also scored on debut, scoring Mumbai's fourth goal in an eventual 4–0 win.

After the Durand Cup, Nathan initially played in the Mumbai City Under-21 team, where he refined his ball control, defensive reading of the game, and passing accuracy. Alongside this, he was also registered by the club in their senior ISL squad.

Nathan made no ISL appearances with the senior team in his first season, but was named on the substitutes bench ten times. Most notably, he was named on the bench for the ISL Cup Final against Mohun Bagan Super Giant, with the Islanders winning 3–1. As he was registered by the club as part of their ISL squad, he earned a medal for the club's triumph. This was the first senior honour of his career.

==== 2024–25 season ====
After pre-season abroad, Nathan was once again named in the club's ISL squad. He made his ISL debut for the club on 2 October 2024, playing from the start in a 0–0 draw at home to Bengaluru FC at left-back.

Nathan's first ISL goal for Mumbai came at home against Kerala Blasters on 3 November 2024, scoring with a volley into the bottom left corner following a Brandon Fernandes corner kick. This was Mumbai's third goal of the match, as the Islanders went on to win 4–2. He scored again in the club's next match on 9 November away against Chennaiyin FC, this time scoring a header at the back post following a Yoell van Nieff corner kick.

Due to his performance in November 2024, Nathan was adjudged to be the ISL Emerging Player of the Month.

Nathan got his first assist for the club away against East Bengal FC on 30 December 2024. After coming on as a late substitute, with three minutes to go in the match, he played a long pass from his own half to Greek forward Nikos Karelis, who broke free to score the winning goal and his second goal of the match, which ended 3–2 to Mumbai City.

On 1 March 2025, Nathan scored his third goal for the club at home against Mohun Bagan. After coming on in the 87th minute with the club 2–1 down, Nathan scored the equalizer in the 89th minute from a rebound, securing a 2–2 draw for the Islanders.

== Career statistics ==
=== Club ===
As of 1 March 2025

Club	Season	League			Super Cup		Durand Cup		AFC		Total	
Club	Season	Division	Apps	Goals	Apps	Goals	Apps	Goals	Apps	Goals	Apps	Goals
Mumbai City	2023–24	Indian Super League	0	0	4	0	1	1	0	0	5	1
Mumbai City	2024–25	Indian Super League	20	3	0	0	0	0	0	0	20	3
Mumbai City	Mumbai City total		20	3	4	0	1	1	0	0	25	4

== Honours ==
Mumbai City FC

- Indian Super League Cup winner: 2023–24

India

- SAFF Championship: 2026
