= Oliver Kelaart =

Sri Lankan footballer (born 1998)

Personal information
- Full name: Oliver James Kelaart Torres
- Date of birth: 16 April 1998 (age 28)
- Place of birth: Melbourne, Victoria, Australia
- Height: 1.78 m (5 ft 10 in)
- Position: Winger

Team information
- Current team: Altona Magic

Youth career
- –2017: Orihuela U19

Senior career*
Years	Team	Apps	(Gls)
2017–2018	Orihuela		
2019–2020	Calamonte	11	(2)
2020	Kormákur/Hvöt	5	(1)
2021	Keflavík	9	(1)
2022	Þróttur Vogum	6	(0)
2023	Njarðvík	14	(5)
2024	Haukar	8	(0)
2025–2026	Hume City	19	(2)
2026–	Altona Magic	13	(1)

International career^{‡}
2024–	Sri Lanka	24	(4)
- * Club domestic league appearances and goals as of 21 June 2026 ‡ National team caps and goals as of 8 November 2026

Oliver James Kelaart Torres (Sinhala: ඔලිවර් කෙලාර්ට්; born 16 April 1998) is a soccer player who plays as a winger for National Premier Leagues Victoria club Altona Magic. Born in Australia, he represents Sri Lanka at international level.

== International career ==
Born in Melbourne, Kelaart is eligible to represent Sri Lanka as his father was born in Colombo.

He was first approached by the Football Federation of Sri Lanka to represent the nation in 2020, under the recommendation of the coach at the time, Amir Alagic. However, due to the federation's FIFA ban in 2023, Kelaart's opportunity to play international football was further delayed.

On 22 March 2024, Kelaart made his debut for the Sri Lanka national team against Papua New Guinea during the 2024 FIFA Series. In the following game, three days later, Kelaart scored his first international goal in a 2–0 victory over Bhutan.

== Personal life ==
Kelaart was born in Melbourne, Australia to a Sri Lankan Burgher father and Spanish mother.

== Career statistics ==
=== International ===
As of 8 November 2026

Appearances and goals by national team and year
National team	Year	Apps	Goals
Sri Lanka	2024	10	2
Sri Lanka	2025	9	1
Sri Lanka	2026	5	1
Total		24	4

=== International goals ===
Scores and results list Sri Lanka's goal tally first.

No.	Date	Venue	Opponent	Score	Result	Competition
1.	25 March 2024	Colombo Racecourse, Colombo, Sri Lanka	Bhutan	2–0	2–0	2024 FIFA Series
2.	10 September 2024	Olympic Stadium, Phnom Penh, Cambodia	Cambodia	1–0	2–2 (a.e.t.); 4–2 (p)	2027 AFC Asian Cup qualification
3.	9 September 2025	Colombo Racecourse, Colombo, Sri Lanka	Maldives	1–1	1–1	Friendly
4.	8 November 2026	National Stadium, Dhaka, Bangladesh	Bhutan	1–1	2–2	2026 SAFF Championship
