= Jason Thayaparan =

Sri Lankan footballer (born 1995)

Personal information
- Full name: Jason Thayaparan
- Date of birth: 1 October 1995 (age 31)
- Place of birth: Trier, Germany
- Height: 1.86 m (6 ft 1 in)
- Position: Centre-back

Team information
- Current team: RW Wittlich

Senior career*
Years	Team	Apps	(Gls)
2013–2016	SV Konz	61	(8)
2016–2018	FSV Tarforst	53	(4)
2018–2025	Eintracht Trier	126	(3)
2026–	RW Wittlich	0	(0)

International career^{‡}
2024–	Sri Lanka	13	(0)
- * Club domestic league appearances and goals as of 5 April 2025 ‡ National team caps and goals as of 14 October 2025

Jason Thayaparan (born 1 October 1995) is a footballer who plays as a centre-back for Rheinlandliga club RW Wittlich. Born in Germany, he represents Sri Lanka at international level.

== Early life ==
He was born in Trier, Germany to a Sri Lankan Tamil father and Greek mother.

== Club career ==
Jason began playing competitive football matches in Germany and first turned up for SV Konz youth team and went onto make his senior debut for the club in 2013. He then joined FSV Trier-Tarforst in 2016. In 2018, he then moved to SV Eintracht Trier 05 and began playing in the Oberliga, the fifth level in the German football league system.

== International career ==
He was invited by the Football Federation of Sri Lanka for trials during Sri Lanka's brief training camp in Doha, Qatar, in 2022. On 22 March 2024, he made his international debut for Sri Lanka during a goalless draw against Papua New Guinea in the 2024 FIFA Series. He was also part of the team in the following game, helping Sri Lanka secure a 2–0 win over Bhutan.

== Career statistics ==
=== International ===
As of 9 September 2025

Appearances and goals by national team and year
National team	Year	Apps	Goals
Sri Lanka	2024	5	0
Sri Lanka	2025	6	0
Total		11	0
