= Najeeb Ullah Khan =

Pakistani former footballer

Najeeb Ullah
Personal information
- Full name: Najeeb Ullah Khan Bettani
- Date of birth: 2 August 2007 (age 19)
- Place of birth: Bhakkar, Pakistan
- Position: Striker

Team information
- Current team: Khan Research Laboratories
- Number: 13

Senior career*
Years	Team	Apps	(Gls)
2024–	Khan Research Laboratories		

International career^{‡}
2026–	Pakistan U20	3	(0)
2026–	Pakistan	3	(3)
- * Club domestic league appearances and goals ‡ National team caps and goals as of 14 November 2026

Najeeb Ullah Khan Bettani (Urdu: نجیب اللہ خان بٹانی; born 2 August 2007) is a Pakistani footballer, who plays as a striker for Khan Research Laboratories, Najeeb Ullah also represents the Pakistan national football team.

== Club career ==
Najeeb Ullah represented the Khan Research Laboratories at the 2026 National Challenge Cup, where he scored a goal against Mamsons in the quarter-finals. The team secured a runners-up position in the competition, falling to rivals WAPDA in the final.

== International career ==
In 2026, Najeeb Ullah was selected for the Pakistan Youth team which participated at the 2026 SAFF U-20 Championship.

Later on, Najeeb Ullah was called up to the Pakistan national team for the 2026 SAFF Championship. On 5 November 2026, Najeeb Ullah was handed his debut against arch-rivals India, he found the back of the net on his debut, delivering a header from a cross by Junaid Shah. In the following game against Maldives, Najeeb Ullah repeated the performance, scoring a brace, rushing in to strike the ball into the net after a cross from Junaid Shah for his first goal, he again scored off an assist from Haris Zeb, doubling his side's margin, resulting in a 3–0 victory for Pakistan.

== Personal life ==
Najeeb Ullah was born in Bhakkar, Punjab into a Pashtun family. His brother Ubaid Ullah has represented and captained Pakistan at youth level.

== Career statistics ==
=== International ===
Appearances and goals by national team and year
National team	Year	Apps	Goals
Pakistan	2026	3	3
Total		3	3

=== International goals ===
Scores and results list Pakistan's goal tally first, score column indicates score after each Najeeb Ullah goal.

List of international goals scored by Najeeb Ullah Khan
No.	Date	Venue	Opponent	Score	Result	Competition
1	5 November 2026	National Stadium, Dhaka, Bangladesh	India	1–3	2–3	2026 SAFF Championship
2	8 November 2026	National Stadium, Dhaka, Bangladesh	Maldives	2–0	3–0	2026 SAFF Championship
3	8 November 2026	National Stadium, Dhaka, Bangladesh	Maldives	3–0	3–0	2026 SAFF Championship

== Honours ==
=== Khan Research Laboratories ===
- National Challenge Cup:
  - Runners-up (1): 2026
