= McKeal Abdullah =

Pakistani footballer

Personal information
- Full name: McKeal Aroon Abdullah
- Date of birth: 7 July 2005 (age 21)
- Place of birth: Nottingham, England
- Height: 1.76 m (5 ft 9 in)
- Position: Forward

Team information
- Current team: Rushall Olympic (loan)

Youth career
- 2021–2023: Mansfield Town

Senior career*
Years	Team	Apps	(Gls)
2023–2025	Mansfield Town	1	(0)
2024–2025	→ Basford United (loan)	17	(4)
2025	→ Ilkeston Town (loan)	13	(1)
2025–2026	→ Rushall Olympic (loan)	2	(2)
2026–	Ilkeston Town		

International career^{‡}
2024–	Pakistan	8	(1)
- * Club domestic league appearances and goals as of 25 April 2025 (UTC) ‡ National team caps and goals as of 8 November 2026 (UTC)

McKeal Aroon Abdullah (Urdu: مکیل ہارون عبداللہ; born 7 July 2005) is a footballer who plays as a forward for Northern Premier League Premier Division club Ilkeston Town. Born in England, he plays for the Pakistan national football team.

== Club career ==
=== Mansfield Town ===
The 2022–23 season saw Abdullah score twenty-five goals across all competitions for the Mansfield Town Under-19s team, winning the Academy Player of the Year award, and being awarded a first professional contract.

On 8 August 2023, he made his senior debut as a late substitute in a 2–0 EFL Cup first round victory over Grimsby Town, making his league debut in similar circumstances four days later against Morecambe.

On 4 October 2024, Abdullah joined Northern Premier League Premier Division side Basford United on loan until January 2025. In February 2025, he joined Ilkeston Town on loan for the remainder of the season.

== International career ==
Abdullah is eligible to play for Pakistan due to his heritage. In November 2023, the Pakistan Football Federation contacted Abdullah, along with Adil Nabi and Mohammad Fazal for the next international window. On 6 June 2024, Abdullah made his debut for Pakistan against Saudi Arabia in the FIFA World Cup Asian Qualifiers as a substitute in the additional time.

In 2026, Abdullah was selected for the national team for the 2026 SAFF Championship. On 8 November 2026, Abdullah scored his first international goal against Maldives from a penalty in the third minute of the game, the match resulted in a 3–0 victory for Pakistan.

== Career statistics ==
=== Club ===
As of 7 February 2025

Appearances and goals by club, season and competition
Club	Season	League			FA Cup		League Cup		Other		Total	
Club	Season	Division	Apps	Goals	Apps	Goals	Apps	Goals	Apps	Goals	Apps	Goals
Mansfield Town	2023–24	League Two	1	0	0	0	1	0	2 (Note: Appearances in EFL Trophy)	0	4	0
Mansfield Town	2024–25	League One	0	0	0	0	0	0	1	0	1	0
Mansfield Town	Total		1	0	0	0	1	0	3	0	5	0
Basford United (loan)	2024–25	Northern Premier League; Premier Division	17	4	0	0	–		5 (Note: Appearance(s) in FA Trophy)	2	22	6
Career total			18	4	0	0	1	0	8	2	27	6

=== International ===
As of 8 November 2026

Appearances and goals by national team and year
National team	Year	Apps	Goals
Pakistan	2024	2	0
Pakistan	2025	4	0
Pakistan	2026	2	1
Total		8	1

Scores and results list Pakistan's goal tally first, score column indicates score after each Abdullah goal.

List of international goals scored by Mckeal Abdullah
No.	Date	Venue	Opponent	Score	Result	Competition
1	8 November 2026	National Stadium, Dhaka, Bangladesh	Maldives	1–0	3–0	2026 SAFF Championship

== Honours ==
Mansfield Town

- EFL League Two third-place promotion: 2023–24

== See also ==
- British Asians in association football
- List of Pakistan international footballers born outside Pakistan
