= Anujan Rajendram =

Norwegian footballer (born 2000)

Personal information
- Date of birth: 11 May 2000 (age 26)
- Place of birth: Hammerfest, Norway
- Positions: Midfielder; full-back

Team information
- Current team: Vindbjart FK

Youth career
- Grei
- Grorud

Senior career*
Years	Team	Apps	(Gls)
2016–2021	Grorud 2	46	(2)
2021–2023	Oppsal	32	(5)
2021–2022	Oppsal 2	13	(1)
2023	Nordstrand	8	(1)
2023	Nordstrand 2	8	(0)
2023–2024	Oppsal	27	(3)
2024–2025	Strindheim	5	(0)
2024	Strindheim 2	2	(0)
2025	Oppsal Fotball	10	(0)
2026–	Vindbjart FK	8	(0)

International career^{‡}
2024–	Sri Lanka	17	(0)
- * Club domestic league appearances and goals as of 23 May 2026 ‡ National team caps and goals as of 08 June 2026

Anujan Rajendram (Sinhala: අනුජන් රාජේන්ද්‍රම්, Tamil: அனுஜன் ராஜேந்திரம்; born 11 May 2000) is a footballer who plays as a midfielder or full-back for Norwegian Third Division club Vindbjart FK. Born in Norway, he represents the Sri Lanka at international level.

== Club career ==
Born in Norway to a Sri Lankan Tamil parents and raised in Ammerud, Rajendram began his footballing career with nearby Grei. He went on to join semi-professional side Grorud, and made his senior debut for their reserve team in the 3. divisjon in 2016. He spent six seasons with Grorud's reserve team, with the last two being severely affected by the COVID-19 pandemic in Norway, before joining Oppsal in 2021.

After two full seasons with Oppsal in the 3. divisjon, Rajendram moved to league rivals Nordstrand in 2023. However, the move did not last long, and by the end of the season he had returned to Oppsal. After two seasons with Oppsal, Rajendram moved to PostNord-ligaen side Strindheim in September 2024, shortly after making his international debut.

== International career ==
Rajendram was first called up to the Sri Lanka national football team in early 2024 ahead of the 2024 FIFA Series in March of the same year. He would have to wait until September 2024 to make his debut, which came in a 0–0 draw with Cambodia in the play-off round of AFC Asian Cup qualification.

== Personal life ==
As well as football, Rajendram also played handball as a child, and balanced his footballing career with one in futsal, where he represented Grorud and Stovner.

== Career statistics ==
=== Club ===
As of 30 September 2024

Appearances and goals by club, season and competition
Club	Season	League			Cup		Other		Total	
Club	Season	Division	Apps	Goals	Apps	Goals	Apps	Goals	Apps	Goals
Grorud 2	2016	3. divisjon	9	0	–		0	0	9	0
Grorud 2	2017	4. divisjon	14	1	–		0	0	14	1
Grorud 2	2018	4. divisjon	7	1	–		0	0	7	1
Grorud 2	2019	4. divisjon	16	0	–		2 (Note: Appearances in the 4. divisjon promotion playoffs)	1	18	1
Grorud 2	2020	3. divisjon	– (Note: The 2020 season was cancelled due to the COVID-19 pandemic in Norway)							
Grorud 2	2021	3. divisjon	0	0	–		0	0	0	0
Grorud 2	Total		46	2	0	0	2	1	48	3
Oppsal	2021	3. divisjon	11	3	1 (Note: Appearances in the Norwegian Cup)	0	0	0	12	3
Oppsal	2022	3. divisjon	21	2	3	0	0	0	24	2
Oppsal	2023	3. divisjon	0	0	1	0	0	0	1	0
Oppsal	Total		32	5	5	0	0	0	37	5
Oppsal 2	2021	4. divisjon	6	1	–		0	0	6	1
Oppsal 2	2022	4. divisjon	7	0	–		0	0	7	0
Oppsal 2	Total		13	1	0	0	0	0	13	1
Nordstrand	2023	3. divisjon	8	1	1	0	0	0	9	1
Nordstrand 2	2023	5. divisjon	8	0	–		0	0	8	0
Oppsal	2023	3. divisjon	11	2	0	0	0	0	11	2
Oppsal	2024	3. divisjon	16	1	2	0	0	0	18	1
Oppsal	Total		27	3	2	0	0	0	29	3
Strindheim	2024	PostNord-ligaen	2	0	0	0	0	0	2	0
Strindheim 2	2024	4. divisjon	2	0	0	0	0	0	2	0
Career total			138	12	8	0	2	1	152	13
