= 2026 SAFF Championship =

Fifteenth edition of the SAFF Championship

TECNO SAFF CHAMPIONSHIP 2026

Tournament details
- Host country: Bangladesh
- Dates: 5–17 November
- Teams: 6 (from 1 sub-confederation)
- Venue: 1 (in 1 host city)

Final positions
- Champions: India (10th title)
- Runners-up: Pakistan

Tournament statistics
- Matches played: 9
- Goals scored: 25 (2.78 per match)
- Attendance: 69,929 (7,770 per match)
- Top scorer: (India) Suhail Bhat (4 goals)
- Best player: (India) Suhail Bhat
- Best goalkeeper: (India) Arsh Anwer Shaikh
- Fair play award: Maldives

The 2026 SAFF Championship (also known as the TECNO SAFF Championship 2026 due to sponsorship reasons with Tecno Mobile) was the 15th edition of the SAFF Championship, the biennial international men's football championship of South Asia organized by the South Asian Football Federation (SAFF).

India, the defending champions, won their record-extending tenth championship by defeating Pakistan in the final.

== Host selection ==
This edition was originally expected to be held in a home-and-away format before organizers opted for a centralized tournament in Sri Lanka. In April 2025, the competition was postponed to 2026 due to venue-related logistical issues, the need for adequate preparation periods for the competing nations, and a desire to align the tournament with the 2026 FIFA World Cup.

However, Sri Lanka subsequently withdrew as host due to logistical limitations. During the SAFF Executive Committee meeting held in Bangkok on 26 January 2026, it was decided that the 2026 SAFF Championship would be hosted in Dhaka, Bangladesh, with an initial schedule set from 21 September to 6 October 2026.

The tournament was later postponed after India accepted an invitation to compete in the 2026 FIFA ASEAN Cup, which overlapped with the original dates. The India team, which was already drawn to be part of Group A, withdrew due to commitments to play a friendly match with Brazil in Kolkata, and was then replaced by Bangladesh. (Note: SAFF President Kazi Salahuddin subsequently confirmed that the competition was rescheduled. While Bangladesh had been chosen as the host nation, SAFF General Secretary Purushottam Kattel stated that the official announcement was deferred pending corporate sponsorships. On 21 July 2026, Bangladesh was officially confirmed as the host country, with the tournament scheduled to take place in Dhaka from 5 to 17 November 2026.)

== Participating nations ==
Altogether six SAFF members confirmed their participation. Nepal was not able to participate in the tournament because the suspension imposed by FIFA had not been lifted by the slated deadline of 30 September 2026.

Country	Appearance	Previous best performance	FIFA ranking (July 2026)
Bangladesh (H)	14th	Champions (2003)	182
Bhutan	10th	Semi-finals (2008)	192
India	15th	Champions (Nine times) (Note: India won in 1993, 1997, 1999, 2005, 2009, 2011, 2015, 2021 and 2023. The 2009 Championship was won by the India under-23 team.)	138
Maldives	13th	Champions (2008, 2018)	172
Pakistan	13th	Third-place (1997)	198
Sri Lanka	15th	Champions (1995)	183

== Squads ==
Each team was required to registered a squad with a minimum of 18 players and a maximum of 23 players, at least three of whom had to be goalkeepers. The All India Football Federation announced a second-string squad would participate. (Note: The first choice Indian national team was sent to participate in FIFA international friendly matches against New Zealand.) In November 2026, the maximum squad was increased to 28 players.

== Venues ==
The National Stadium in Dhaka hosted all the matches of this edition.

Dhaka	Location of venue in Bangladesh
National Stadium	Location of venue in Bangladesh
23°44′7.8″N 90°24′40.7″E	Location of venue in Bangladesh
Capacity: 22,400	Location of venue in Bangladesh
National Stadium	Location of venue in Bangladesh

== Draw ==
The official logo unveiling ceremony took place in Dhaka on 25 July 2026, while the official draw ceremony concluded in Thimphu, Bhutan, on 1 August 2026.

=== Draw pot ===
This draw was conducted based on the latest FIFA Men's World Ranking published on 20 July 2026.

Pot 1	Pot 2	Pot 3
Bangladesh (H) (185); India (138)	Maldives (172); Sri Lanka (183)	Bhutan (192); Pakistan (197)

=== Draw result ===
Group A
Pos	Team
A1	Bangladesh
A2	Sri Lanka
A3	Bhutan

Group B
Pos	Team
B1	India
B2	Maldives
B3	Pakistan

== Match officials ==
Referee & Fourth Official

- (Indonesia) Thoriq Alkatiri
- (Oman) Mohammed Khalfan Al Manai
- (Singapore) Ahmad A'Qashah
- (Vietnam) Lê Vũ Linh
- (Vietnam) Ngô Duy Lân

Assistant referees

- (Indonesia) Gede Raharja
- (Indonesia) Nurhadi Sulchan
- (Laos) Kilar Ladsavong
- (Thailand) Chotrawee Tongduang
- (Thailand) Rachain Srichai
- (Vietnam) Nguyễn Lâm Minh Đăng

Video Assistant Referee

- (Singapore) Muhammad Taqi
- (Thailand) Sivakorn Pu-udom

Referee assessor

- (Thailand) Preecha Kangram

Match commissioner

- (Bhutan) Mindu Dorji
- (Bhutan) Tshewang Tashi
- (India) Arunava Bhattacharya
- (Malaysia) Abdul Basith Bin Shahul Hamid

== Group stage ==
- All matches took place in Dhaka, Bangladesh.
- All times are listed in Bangladesh Standard Time (UTC+06:00).

=== Group A ===
Pos	Team	Pld	W	D	L	GF	GA	GD	Pts	Qualification
1	Bangladesh (H)	2	2	0	0	5	0	+5	6	Advanced to the Knockout stage
2	Bhutan	2	0	1	1	2	3	−1	1	Advanced to the Knockout stage
3	Sri Lanka	2	0	1	1	2	6	−4	1	

Source: SAFF
(H) Hosts
5 November 2026
20:00

Bhutan	0–1	Bangladesh
	Report	Ibrahim 69'

National Stadium, Dhaka
Attendance: 12,783
Referee: Thoriq Alkatiri (Indonesia)

8 November 2026
20:00

Sri Lanka	2–2	Bhutan
Kelaart 35'; Razeek 43'	Report	Tshering 34'; Gyeltshen 76'

National Stadium, Dhaka
Attendance: 1,012
Referee: Mohammed Khalfan Al Manai (Oman)

11 November 2026
20:00

Bangladesh	4–0	Sri Lanka
Shome 8'; Choudhury 44'; Wahid 53'; Rakib 87'	Report

National Stadium, Dhaka
Attendance: 18,631
Referee: Lê Vũ Linh (Vietnam)

=== Group B ===
Pos	Team	Pld	W	D	L	GF	GA	GD	Pts	Qualification
1	India	2	2	0	0	4	2	+2	6	Advanced to the Knockout stage
2	Pakistan	2	1	0	1	5	3	+2	3	Advanced to the Knockout stage
3	Maldives	2	0	0	2	0	4	−4	0	

Source: SAFF
5 November 2026
15:30

Pakistan	2–3	India
Najeeb 90+1'; Ghazi 90+4'	Report	Bhat 13', 19'; Kipgen 32'

National Stadium, Dhaka
Attendance: 2,300
Referee: Ngô Duy Lân (Vietnam)

8 November 2026
15:30

Maldives	0–3	Pakistan
	Report	M. Abdullah 3' (pen.); Najeeb 8', 23'

National Stadium, Dhaka
Attendance: 203
Referee: Ahmad A'Qashah (Singapore)

11 November 2026
15:30

India	1–0	Maldives
Bhat 38' (pen.)	Report

National Stadium, Dhaka
Attendance: 1,969
Referee: Mohammed Khalfan Al Manai (Oman)

== Knockout stage ==
Semi-finals
14 November – Dhaka
India	2
Bhutan	1
14 November – Dhaka
Bangladesh	0
Pakistan	1

Final
17 November – Dhaka
India	2
Pakistan	1

=== Semi-finals ===
14 November 2026
15:00

India	2–1	Bhutan
Vishnu 8'; Konsham 27'	Report	Tobden 48'

National Stadium, Dhaka
Attendance: 1,700
Referee: Thoriq Alkatiri (Indonesia)
14 November 2026
20:30

Bangladesh	0–1	Pakistan
	Report	Arshad 86'

National Stadium, Dhaka
Attendance: 21,983
Referee: Ngô Duy Lân (Vietnam)

=== Final ===
17 November 2026
20:30

India	2–1	Pakistan
Bhat 61'; Mandi 88'	Report	Ghazi 45+1'

National Stadium, Dhaka
Attendance: 9,348
Referee: Mohammed Khalfan Al Manai (Oman)

== Statistics ==
=== Goalscorers ===
There were 25 goals scored in 9 matches, for an average of 2.78 goals per match.

4 goals

- (India) Suhail Ahmad Bhat

3 goals

- (Pakistan) Najeeb Ullah Khan

2 goals

- (Pakistan) Alamgir Ghazi

1 goal

- (Bangladesh) Farhaan Ali Wahid
- (Bangladesh) Hamza Choudhury
- (Bangladesh) Mohammad Ibrahim
- (Bangladesh) Rakib Hossain
- (Bangladesh) Shamit Shome
- (Bhutan) Chencho Gyeltshen
- (Bhutan) Dawa Tshering
- (Bhutan) Kinzang Tashi Tobden
- (India) Chinglensana Singh Konsham
- (India) Manglenthang Kipgen
- (India) Sandip Mandi
- (India) Vishnu Puthiya Valappill
- (Pakistan) Abdul Arshad
- (Pakistan) Alamgir Ghazi
- (Pakistan) McKeal Abdullah
- (Sri Lanka) Ahmed Waseem Razeek
- (Sri Lanka) Oliver Kelaart

== Awards ==
Most Valuable Player	Top Scorer	Goalkeeper	Fair Play
(India) Suhail Bhat	(India) Suhail Bhat (4 goals)	(India) Arsh Anwer Shaikh	Maldives

== Broadcasting ==
Country	Broadcaster	Ref.
Bangladesh	T Sports, Bongo BD, Toffee	
India	Veto India	
Pakistan	Myco, Tamasha	
Sri Lanka	Bongo BD	
Bhutan	Bongo BD	
Maldives	Medianet	

== See also ==
- 2026 SAFF Women's Championship
- 2026 FIFA ASEAN Cup
- 2026 FIFA World Cup
