= Tufail Shinwari =

Pakistani footballer

Personal information
- Full name: Tufail Khan Shinwari
- Date of birth: 10 May 2006 (age 20)
- Place of birth: Landi Kotal, Pakistan
- Height: 1.63 m (5 ft 4 in)
- Position: Attacking midfielder

Team information
- Current team: Karachi United
- Number: 24

Youth career
- 2022–2023: Muslim Hands

Senior career*
Years	Team	Apps	(Gls)
2024–	Karachi United	50	(12)

International career
2025–	Pakistan U23	3	(0)
2025–	Pakistan	3	(0)
- * Club domestic league appearances and goals

Tufail Khan Shinwari (born 10 May 2006) is a Pakistani footballer who plays as an attacking midfielder for Karachi United and the Pakistan national team.

== Early and personal life ==
Shinwari was born in Landi Kotal, a town in Khyber Pakhtunkhwa, Pakistan. He started playing football in the streets. In 2022, he completed grade 12 on a scholarship from a private institution in Peshawar.

== Club career ==
=== Early career ===
Shinwari represented Pakistan in the Street Child World Cup in Qatar in 2022, after getting noticed by a charity organisation called Muslim Hands, during open trials in Nowshera. With three hat-tricks and 13 goals, he won the Golden Boot, and led the team to the final, which they lost to Egypt on penalties.

In 2023, he represented the Pakistan street child football team at the Norway Cup in Oslo, leading the team to the runner-ups place after losing to Sola FK in the final.

=== Karachi United ===
In 2024, Shinwari signed his first club contract with Karachi United.

== International career ==
In September 2025, Shinwari represented Pakistan U23 at the 2026 AFC U-23 Asian Cup qualification. The next month, he made his senior international debut with Pakistan against Afghanistan at the 2027 AFC Asian Cup qualification ending in a goalless draw. He also started the away match against Afghanistan that was held in Kuwait. He assisted Shayek Dost's goal against Myanmar in the third round of the 2027 AFC Asian Cup qualification.

== Career statistics ==
=== International ===
As of 31 March 2026

Appearances and goals by national team and year
National team	Year	Apps	Goals
Pakistan	2025	2	0
Pakistan	2026	1	0
Total		3	0
