= Alamgir Ghazi =

Pakistani footballer

Personal information
- Full name: Alamgir Ali Khan Ghazi
- Date of birth: 9 May 2001 (age 25)
- Place of birth: Charun, Chitral district, Pakistan
- Height: 5 ft 11 in (1.80 m)
- Position: Midfielder

Team information
- Current team: WAPDA

Youth career
- Highlanders
- Mehran

Senior career*
| Years | Team | Apps | (Gls) |
| 2019–2020 | Pakistan Television | | |
| 2020–2022 | Khan Research Laboratories | 12 | (9) |
| 2022– | WAPDA | | |
| 2024–2025 | → Adalat Farah (loan) | | |
| 2025 | → Thimphu City (loan) | 12 | (2) |
| 2026 | → Brothers Union (loan) | 8 | (0) |

International career^{‡}
| 2020 | Pakistan U20 | 4 | (0) |
| 2023 | Pakistan U23 | 3 | (1) |
| 2022– | Pakistan | 28 | (2) |
- * Club domestic league appearances and goals as of 11 June 2026 ‡ National team caps and goals as of 17 November 2026

Alamgir Ali Khan Ghazi (Khowar: عالمگیر علی خان غازی, Urdu: عالمگیر علی خان غازی; born 9 May 2001) is a Pakistani professional footballer who plays as a midfielder for Brothers Union and the Pakistan national team.

== Early and personal life ==
Ghazi was born in the town of Charun in the Chitral district of Pakistan. He is son of politician Rehmat Ghazi affiliated with PTI, and cousin of former international striker Muhammad Rasool. Ghazi started playing football at the age of 11.

== Club career ==
=== Early career ===
Ghazi played for Highlanders FC in Chitral at youth level. He later played for Mehran. He was subsequently called by departmental side Pakistan Television for the 2019 PFF National Challenge Cup. At the end of 2019, Ghazi participated in the Khyber Pakhtunkhwa Football Cup organised by Ufone, along with his cousin Muhammad Rasool with district football team DFA Chitral, losing in the final on penalties against Peshawar Combined FC.

=== Khan Research Laboratories ===
In 2020, Ghazi joined Khan Research Laboratories. In September 2021, he netted a hat-trick in a 6–0 victory against Karachi United during the 2021–22 Pakistan Premier League at the Ibn-e-Qasim Bagh Stadium. The league was cancelled shortly after starting.

In December 2021, Ghazi again played with DFA Chitral with Muhammad Rasool as captain, winning the 2021 Khyber Pakhtunkhwa Football Cup after winning in the final against Muslim FC.

=== WAPDA ===
By 2022 Ghazi signed for WAPDA, helping the team winning the 2023–24 PFF National Challenge Cup which was one of the competitions after years of inactivity in domestic football.

==== Loan to Adalat Farah ====
On 26 December 2024, Ghazi along with fellow national teammates Haseeb Khan and Shayak Dost joined Afghanistan Champions League club Adalat Farah in the middle of the season on a loan deal.

==== Loan to Thimpu City ====
On 10 April 2025, Ghazi moved to Bhutan Premier League club Thimphu City.

==== Loan to Brothers Union ====
In January 2026, Ghazi joined the Bangladeshi football club Brothers Union for the second round of the Bangladesh Football League.

== International career ==
Ghazi represented Pakistan at the youth level in 2020 AFC U-19 Championship qualification. He went on to make four appearances in the campaign.

In August 2022 Ghazi was called up for a trials with the senior national team. In November the same year, he was included in Pakistan's squad for a friendly against Nepal, Pakistan's first fixture in nearly three-and-a-half years because of the Pakistan Football Federation's suspension by FIFA. He made his senior international debut in the starting lineup in the eventual 0–1 away defeat.

He was called in September 2023 for the 2024 AFC U-23 Asian Cup qualification where he scored a long range goal from the half of the field on a 1–3 loss against Bahrain, as Pakistan exited the group losing three games in the group. On 31 March 2026, he captained the national team for the first time at the 2027 AFC Asian Cup qualification against Myanmar. On 5 November 2026, he scored an acrobatic bicycle kick against India at the 94th minute to cut the deficit down to a 3–2 loss in the SAFF Championship Group stage.

== Futsal career ==
Alongside his football career, Ghazi also played futsal at club level. In July 2017, he participated in the Neymar Jr’s 5 tournament with the futsal section of his youth club Highlanders FC in Brazil. (Note: Ghazi at the far left in the picture of the squad.) Ghazi started playing for Team Eighteen in Islamabad since the establishment of the club in 2018. He also played for the futsal section of Karachi club Abdul FC. In 2024, he participated in the Futsal National Cup with the club, finalizing as runner-up of the phase in Karachi after falling to Forza FC in the final in the penalties.

== Career statistics ==
=== International ===
As of 17 November 2026

Appearances and goals by national team and year
| National team | Year | Apps | Goals |
|---|---|---|---|
| Pakistan | 2022 | 1 | 0 |
| Pakistan | 2023 | 9 | 0 |
| Pakistan | 2024 | 3 | 0 |
| Pakistan | 2025 | 5 | 0 |
| Pakistan | 2026 | 10 | 2 |
| Total | | 28 | 2 |

Scores and results list Pakistan's goal tally first, score column indicates score after each Ghazi goal.

List of international goals scored by Alamgir Ghazi
| No. | Date | Venue | Opponent | Score | Result | Competition |
|---|---|---|---|---|---|---|
| 1 | 5 November 2026 | National Stadium, Dhaka, Bangladesh | India | 2–3 | 2–3 | 2026 SAFF Championship |
| 2 | 17 November 2026 | National Stadium, Dhaka, Bangladesh | India | 1–0 | 1–2 | 2026 SAFF Championship |

== Honours ==
WAPDA

- PFF National Challenge Cup: 2023–24

Pakistan

- Diamond Jubilee Football Tournament: 2026
