= Junaid Shah =

Pakistani footballer (born 2000)

Personal information
- Full name: Syed Junaid Ahmed Shah
- Date of birth: 23 March 2003 (age 23)
- Place of birth: Quetta, Pakistan
- Positions: Centre-back; left-back

Team information
- Current team: SA Gardens

Senior career*
Years	Team	Apps	(Gls)
2019–2023	Pakistan Civil Aviation Authority		
2024–	SA Gardens		
2024	→ Wahidy (loan)		

International career^{‡}
2018	Pakistan U17		
2023–	Pakistan	8	(0)
- * Club domestic league appearances and goals as of 23:00, 10 November 2023 (UTC) ‡ National team caps and goals as of 23:00, 31 March 2026 (UTC)

Syed Junaid Ahmed Shah (born 23 March 2003) is a Pakistani professional footballer who plays as a left-back for SA Gardens and the Pakistan national team.

== Club career ==
=== Civil Aviation Authority ===
Shah joined Pakistan Premier League club Pakistan Civil Aviation Authority in 2019, making his debut in the 2019 PFF National Challenge Cup. He made 7 appearances in the 2021–22 Pakistan Premier League until the league was cancelled shortly after starting.

=== SA Gardens ===
On 2 March 2024, Shah signed for SA Gardens.

==== Loan to Wahidy ====
On 10 April 2024, Shah was loaned to Afghanistan Champions League club Wahidy FC on a one-season deal. He returned to SA Gardens in May 2024, following the resumption of the 2023–24 PFF National Challenge Cup.

== International career ==
In October 2018, Shah was called up by the Pakistan under-15 team for the 2018 SAFF U-15 Championship held in Nepal. The team finished as the runners-up following a penalty shootout in the final against Bangladesh.

In November 2022, Shah was included in Pakistan's squad for a friendly against Nepal, Pakistan's first fixture in nearly three-and-a-half years because of the Pakistan Football Federation's suspension by FIFA. He made his senior international debut in the FIFA 2026 World Cup qualifiers as a starter against in a goalless draw against Cambodia in the first leg in Phnom Penh. He played his second match in their second leg, beating Cambodia 1–0 in Islamabad, recording Pakistan first-ever victory in World Cup qualifiers in their first fixture in home after 8 years, and qualifying for the second round for the first time. On the 16th of November 2026, Shah received a red card, while Pakistan were leading 1-0 vs India in 2026 SAFF Championship Final. Pakistan would go onto lose the game 2-1.

== Career statistics ==
=== International ===
As of 31 March 2026

Appearances and goals by national team and year
National team	Year	Apps	Goals
Pakistan	2023	4	0
Pakistan	2025	3	0
Pakistan	2026	1	0
Total		8	0
