= Suhail Ahmad Bhat =

Indian footballer (born 2005)

Suhail Bhat
Personal information
- Full name: Suhail Ahmad Bhat
- Date of birth: 8 April 2005 (age 21)
- Place of birth: Jammu and Kashmir, India
- Height: 1.80 m (5 ft 11 in)
- Position: Striker

Team information
- Current team: Mohun Bagan
- Number: 72

Youth career
- 2017–2021: J&K Sports Council FA

Senior career*
Years	Team	Apps	(Gls)
2021–2022	Indian Arrows	7	(0)
2023–	Mohun Bagan	19	(0)

International career^{‡}
2020–2022	India U17	14	(10)
2023–	India U23	16	(11)
2025–	India	5	(4)
Medal record
Men's football
Representing India
SAFF Championship
Winner	2026 Bangladesh
- * Club domestic league appearances and goals as of 18:39, 29 August 2026 (UTC) ‡ National team caps and goals as of 17 November 2026 (UTC)

Suhail Ahmad Bhat (born 8 April 2005) is an Indian professional footballer who plays as a forward for Indian Super League club Mohun Bagan and the India national team.

== Club career ==
In 2017, Bhat was selected from a football camp in Srinagar to join the Sports Council Football Academy.

=== Indian Arrows ===
On 30 January 2022, He joined Indian Arrows during the 2021-22 I-League. He made his professional debut in the second match of the relegation stage coming on as a 70-minute substitute in a 1–0 win over Sudeva Delhi. He made seven appearances but scored no goals as Arrows finished tenth. In September 2022, he was named by English newspaper The Guardian as one of the best players born in 2005 worldwide.

=== Mohun Bagan ===
==== 2022–23: Youth Team ====
Following the disbanding of the Indian Arrows, he was left without a club. However, on 1 January 2023, he joined Mohun Bagan. He played for the U21 team in the 2023 Reliance Foundation Development League. He played in fifteen matches and scored eight goals with a hatrick against Mohammedan SC as the Mariners finished third in the tournament. He was also selected to play in the Next Gen Cup where he played in all matches and scored a goal against West Ham U21 with Mariners finishing sixth. He remained with the youth and reserve team for most of the season unable to break in the first team.

==== 2023–24: First team breakthrough ====
He scored his debut goal for the first team of Mohun Bagan in their 5–0 win over Bangladesh Army at the 2023 Durand Cup group stage.

== International career ==
Bhat was first called up for the India national under-16 football team in 2021, scoring on his debut against the United Arab Emirates.

On 4 June 2025, Bhat played his first game for the India senior team in the 0–2 defeat to Thailand in a Friendly match.

== Career statistics ==
=== Club ===
As of match played 12 October 2026

Club	Season	League			Super Cup		Durand Cup		Continental		Others		Total	
Club	Season	Division	Apps	Goals	Apps	Goals	Apps	Goal	Apps	Goals	Apps	Goals	Apps	Goals
Indian Arrows	2021–22	I-League	7	0	—		—		—		—		7	0
Mohun Bagan	2023–24	Indian Super League	7	0	3	0	3	1	2	0	10 (Note: Appearance(s) in Calcutta Football League)	8	25	9
Mohun Bagan	2024–25	Indian Super League	11	0	2	2	3	2	–		6	7	22	11
Mohun Bagan	2025–26	Indian Super League	0	0	2	0	3	1	–		2 (Note: 1 Appearance in IFA Shield & 1 Appearance in 2025 CFL Premier Division)	0	7	1
Mohun Bagan	2026–27	Indian Super League	1	0	—		3	2	–		17 (Note: 13 Appearances and 6 goals in 2026 Calcutta League and 4 Appearances in 2026 IFA Shield)	6	21	8
Mohun Bagan	Total		19	0	7	2	12	6	2	0	35	21	75	29
Career total			26	0	7	2	12	6	2	0	35	21	82	29

=== International ===
As of 17 November 2026

National team	Year	Apps	Goals
India	2025	1	0
India	2026	4	4
Total		5	4

As of match played 17 November 2026
India score listed first, score column indicates score after each Suhail Ahmad Bhat goal

List of international goals scored by Suhail Ahmad Bhat
No.	Date	Venue	Cap	Opponent	Score	Result	Competition
1	5 November 2026	National Stadium, Dhaka, Bangladesh	2	Pakistan	1–0	3–2	2026 SAFF Championship
2	5 November 2026	National Stadium, Dhaka, Bangladesh	2	Pakistan	2–0	3–2	2026 SAFF Championship
3	11 November 2026	National Stadium, Dhaka, Bangladesh	3	Maldives	1–0	1–0	2026 SAFF Championship
4	17 November 2026	National Stadium, Dhaka, Bangladesh	5	Pakistan	1–1	2–1	2026 SAFF Championship

== Honours ==
Mohun Bagan

- Indian Super League Shield: 2023–24, 2024–25
- Indian Super League Cup: 2024–25; runner-up: 2023–24
- Durand Cup: 2023; runner-up: 2024
- IFA Shield: 2025, 2026
- Calcutta Football League: 2026

India

- SAFF Championship: 2026

Individual

- SAFF Championship Best player: 2026
- SAFF Championship Top scorer: 2026
