= Arsh Anwer Shaikh =

Indian football player

Personal information
- Date of birth: 9 July 2002 (age 24)
- Place of birth: Durg, Chhattisgarh, India
- Height: 1.88 m (6 ft 2 in)
- Position: Goalkeeper

Team information
- Current team: Kerala Blasters
- Number: 31

Youth career
- ATK

Senior career*
Years	Team	Apps	(Gls)
2020	ATK	0	(0)
2020–2024	Mohun Bagan B	0	(0)
2024–2025	Mohun Bagan	12	(0)
2025–	Kerala Blasters	14	(0)

International career
2024	India U23	1	(0)
2026–	India	3	(0)
Medal record
Men's football
Representing India
SAFF Championship
Winner	2026 Bangladesh
- * Club domestic league appearances and goals as of 18 October 2026

Arsh Anwer Shaikh (born 09 July 2002) is an Indian professional footballer who plays as a goalkeeper for Indian Super League club Kerala Blasters.

== Career ==
=== 2025–present - Kerala Blasters ===
On 14 June 2025, Shaikh was signed by Indian Super League side Kerala Blasters on a three-year deal. He debuted for the club on 22 February 2026, in an Indian Super League match versus Mumbai City, where the Blasters lost for 1–0.

== Honours ==
India

- SAFF Championship: 2026

Individual

- SAFF Championship Best goalkeeper: 2026
