= SAFF Championship =

Football tournament of Asia

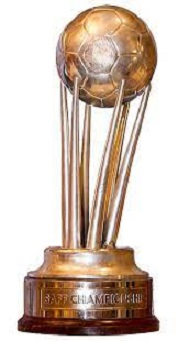
- The original SAFF Championship trophy
- Organiser(s): SAFF
- Founded: 1993; 33 years ago (as SAARC Gold Cup)
- Region: South Asia
- Teams: 7: Bangladesh; Bhutan; India; Maldives; Nepal; Pakistan; Sri Lanka
- Related competitions: SAFF Women's Championship
- Current champions: India (10th title)
- Most championships: India (10 titles)
- Website: saffederation.org
- 2026 SAFF Championship

The SAFF Championship (earlier the SAARC Gold Cup and the SAFF Gold Cup) is the primary football competition contested by the senior men's national teams of the South Asian Football Federation (SAFF), determining the sub-continental champion of the South Asia.

== History ==
Countries that currently compete in the tournaments are Bangladesh, Bhutan, India, Maldives, Nepal, Pakistan and Sri Lanka. It is held approximately every two years. India won the title 10 times, 8 more than second most successful, Maldives. Afghanistan joined the SAFF in 2005 and left in 2015 to become a founding member of the Central Asian Football Association (CAFA).

The South Asian Football Federation (SAFF) Championship kicked off in Lahore in 1993, evolving out of its forerunner, the South Asian Association of Regional Co-operation (SAARC) Gold Cup. Since its inception, the biennial competition has developed into South Asia's premier football tournament, promoting the regional development of the game. The SAFF Championship was first postponed from October 2001 to January 2002 due to the suspension of the Bangladesh Football Federation; the tournament finally took place in 2003. The 2021 edition of the tournament was postponed twice due to the COVID-19 pandemic.

== Organisation ==
Sports marketing, media, and event management company Sportfive (formerly Lagardère Sports) has been involved in the tournament since 2025.

=== Title sponsorship ===
Period	Sponsor	Name
1993	No title sponsor	SAARC Gold Cup
1995	Ceylon Tobacco Company	Bristol SAARC Gold Cup
1997	No title sponsor	SAFF Gold Cup
1999	Coca-Cola	SAFF Coca-Cola Cup
2003–2005	No title sponsor	SAFF Gold Cup
2008	No title sponsor	SAFF Championship
2009	BEXIMCO	Bangabandhu SAFF Championship
2011	Karbonn	Karbonn SAFF Championship
2013	No title sponsor	SAFF Championship
2015–2018	Suzuki	SAFF Suzuki Cup
2021	Ooredoo	Ooredoo SAFF Championship
2023	Bashundhara Toiletries	Bangabandhu SAFF Championship
2026	Tecno Mobile	TECNO SAFF Championship
Source: GSA

== Results ==
Ed.	Year	Hosts	Final			Third place playoff			No. of teams
Ed.	Year	Hosts	Champions	Score	Runners-up	Third place	Score	Fourth place	No. of teams
1	1993	Pakistan	India	^{RR}	Sri Lanka	Nepal	^{RR}	Pakistan	4
2	1995	Sri Lanka	Sri Lanka	1–0 (a.s.d.e.t.)	India	Bangladesh and Nepal			5
3	1997	Nepal	India	5–1	Maldives	Pakistan	1–0	Sri Lanka	6
4	1999	India	India	2–0	Bangladesh	Maldives	2–0	Nepal	6
5	2003	Bangladesh	Bangladesh	1–1 (a.e.t.) (5–3 p)	Maldives	India	2–1 (a.s.d.e.t.)	Pakistan	8
6	2005	Pakistan	India	2–0	Bangladesh	Maldives and Pakistan			8
7	2008	Maldives; Sri Lanka	Maldives	1–0	India	Bhutan and Sri Lanka			8
8	2009	Bangladesh	India U-23	0–0 (a.e.t.) (3–1 p)	Maldives	Bangladesh and Sri Lanka			8
9	2011	India	India	4–0	Afghanistan	Maldives and Nepal			8
10	2013	Nepal	Afghanistan	2–0	India	Maldives and Nepal			8
11	2015	India	India	2–1 (a.e.t.)	Afghanistan	Maldives and Sri Lanka			7
12	2018	Bangladesh	Maldives	2–1	India	Nepal and Pakistan			7
13	2021	Maldives	India	3–0	Nepal	Maldives	^{RR (Note: The format of the tournament was changed to round-robin due to the suspension of Pakistan and the withdrawal of Bhutan. Maldives finished third in points and hence listed as third place.)}	Bangladesh	5
14	2023	India	India	1–1 (a.e.t.) (5–4 p)	Kuwait	Bangladesh and Lebanon			8
15	2026	Bangladesh	India (Note: The All India Football Federation (AIFF) announced a second-string squad would participate. The first choice Indian national team was sent to participate in FIFA international friendly matches against New Zealand.)	2–1	Pakistan	Bangladesh and Bhutan			6

== Overall records ==
In this ranking 3 points are awarded for a win, 1 for a draw and 0 for a loss. Matches decided in extra time are counted as wins and losses, while matches decided by penalty shoot-outs are counted as draws. Teams are ranked by total points, then by goal difference, then by goals scored.

As of 2026 SAFF Championship

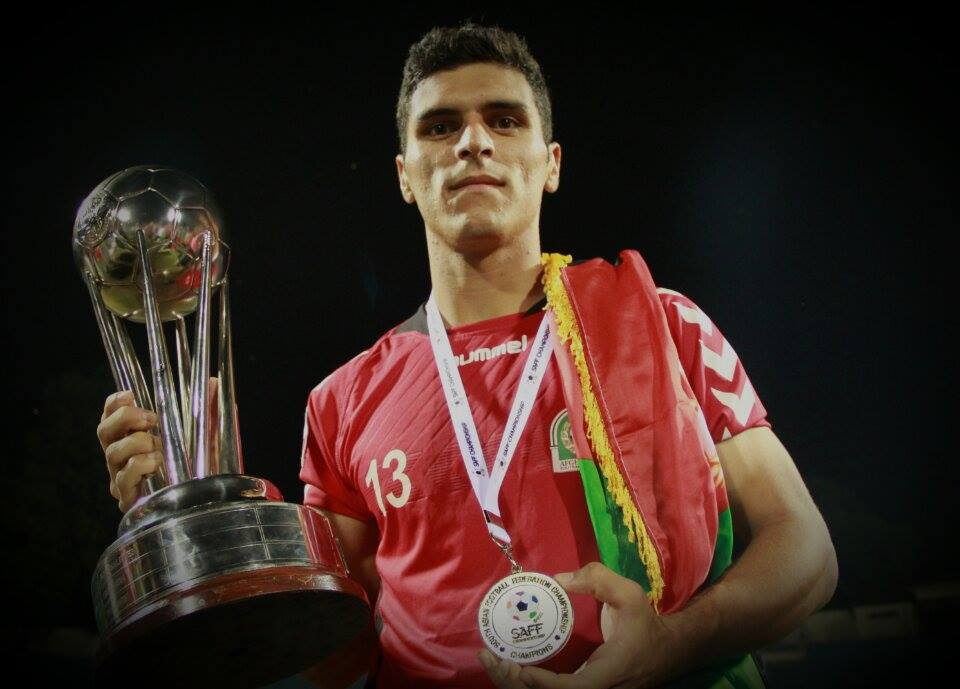
Afghanistan's Hamid Karimi holding the SAFF trophy after winning the 2013 SAFF Championship

Rank	Team	Part	Pld	W	D	L	GF	GA	GD	Pts
1	India^{1}	15	66	43	15	8	116	41	+75	144
2	Maldives	13	52	25	11	16	98	56	+42	86
3	Bangladesh	14	49	20	12	17	57	48	+9	72
4	Pakistan	13	43	14	8	21	39	56	−17	50
5	Nepal	14	46	14	7	25	51	68	−17	49
6	Sri Lanka	14	43	13	8	22	50	71	−21	47
7	Afghanistan	7	27	12	4	11	48	42	+6	40
8	Kuwait	1	5	3	2	0	9	2	+7	11
9	Lebanon	1	4	3	1	0	7	1	+6	10
10	Bhutan	10	30	1	2	27	18	107	−89	5

^{1}Including India U-23 and India B teams.

Nation	Champions	Runners-up	Third-place	Fourth-place	Semi-finalists
India	10 (1993, 1997, **1999**, 2005, 2009, (Note: India was represented by the India U-23 team.) **2011**, **2015**, 2021, **2023,** 2026 (Note: India was represented by the India B team.))	4 (1995, 2008, 2013, 2018)	1 (2003)	–	–
Maldives	2 (**2008**, 2018)	3 (1997, 2003, 2009)	2 (1999, **2021**)	–	4 (2005, 2011, 2013, 2015)
Bangladesh	1 (**2003**)	2 (1999, 2005)	1 (1995)	1 (2021)	4 (1995, **2009**, 2023, **2026**)
Afghanistan*	1 (2013)	2 (2011, 2015)	–	–	–
Sri Lanka	1 (**1995**)	1 (1993)	–	1 (1997)	3 (**2008**, 2009, 2015)
Nepal	–	1 (2021)	1 (1993)	2 (1995, 1999)	3 (2011, **2013**, 2018)
Pakistan	–	1 (2026)	1 (1997)	2 (**1993**, 2003)	2 (**2005**, 2018)
Kuwait^{3}	–	1 (2023)	–	–	–
Bhutan	–	–	–	–	2 (2008, 2026)
Lebanon^{3}	–	–	–	–	1 (2023)

Bold = Hosts
* = No longer SAFF member
^{3} = Invited as guest teams from WAFF

== Results by tournament ==
Legend

- 1st – Champions
- 2nd – Runners-up
- 3rd – Third place
- 4th – Fourth place
- SF – Semifinals^{1}
- GS – Group stage
- DQ – Disqualified/Suspended by FIFA/AFC/SAFF
- Q – Qualified for upcoming tournament
- — Hosts
- × – Did not enter
- × – Withdrew before tournament begins
- — Not part of SAFF

Team	1993	1995	1997	1999	2003	2005	2008	2009	2011	2013	2015	2018	2021	2023	2026	Total
Bangladesh	×	SF	GS	2nd	1st	2nd	GS	SF	GS	GS	GS	GS	GS	SF	SF	14
Bhutan	Not part of SAFF				GS	GS	SF	GS	GS	GS	GS	GS	×	GS	SF	10
India^{2}	1st	2nd	1st	1st	3rd	1st	2nd	1st^{2}	1st	2nd	1st	2nd	1st	1st	1st	15
Maldives	×	×	2nd	3rd	2nd	SF	1st	2nd	SF	SF	SF	1st	GS	GS	GS	13
Nepal	3rd	SF	GS	4th	GS	GS	GS	GS	SF	SF	GS	SF	2nd	GS	DQ	14
Pakistan	4th	GS	3rd	GS	4th	SF	GS	GS	GS	GS	×	SF	DQ	GS	2nd	13
Sri Lanka	2nd	1st	4th	GS	GS	GS	SF	SF	GS	GS	SF	GS	GS	DQ	GS	14
Former team(s)
Afghanistan^{3}	Not part of SAFF				GS	GS	GS	GS	2nd	1st	2nd	Part of CAFA				7
Guest teams
Kuwait^{4}	×													2nd	×	1
Lebanon^{4}	×													SF	×	1

^{1}The third-place match was not played in 1995 and has not been played 2003 onwards.
^{2}Including India U23 team.
^{3}Left SAFF and joined CAFA in 2015.
^{4}Invited as a guest team from the WAFF.

== Top goalscorers ==
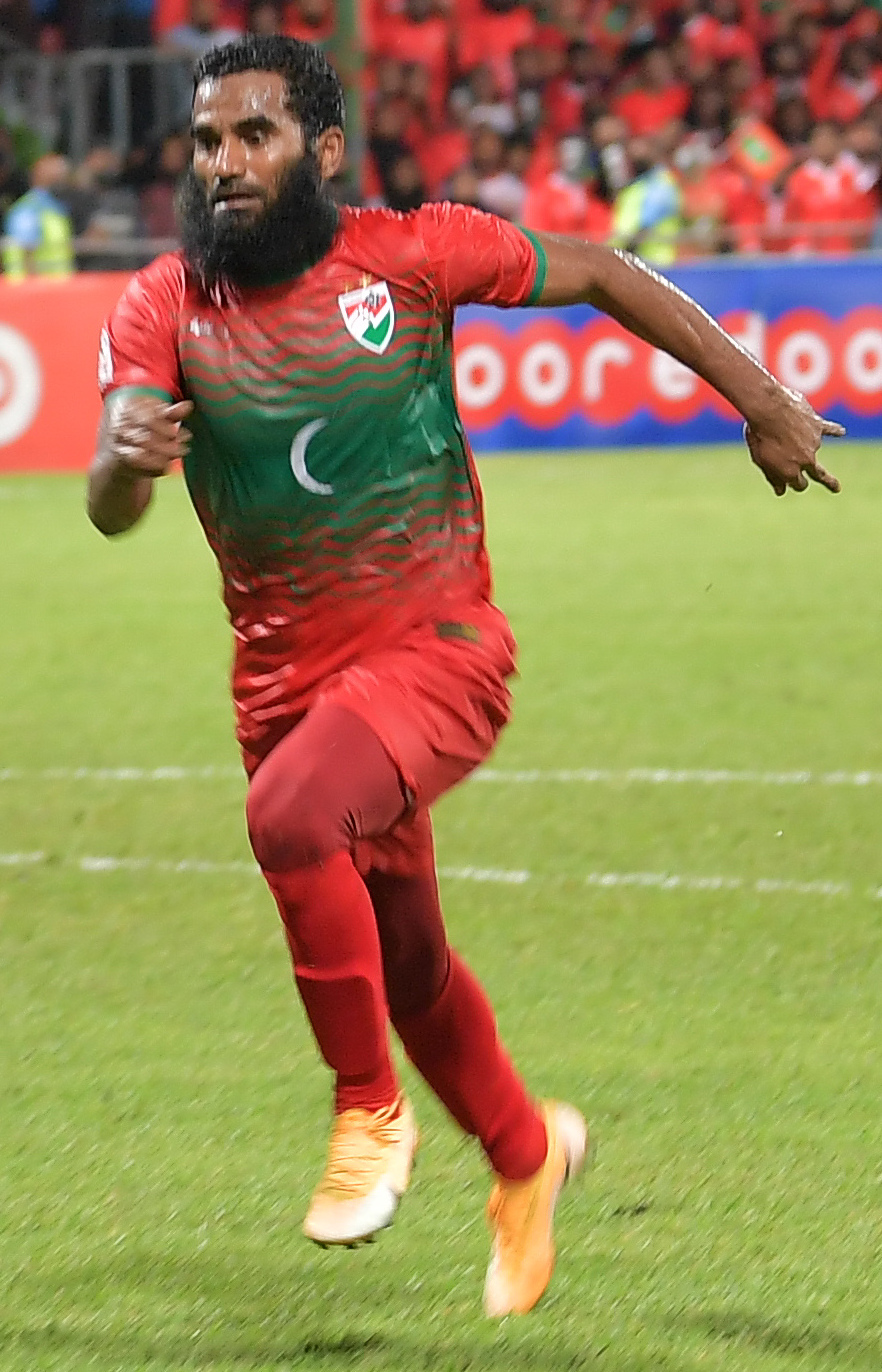
Ali Ashfaq of Maldives scored the most number of goals in a single championship, 10 goals at the 2013 Championship

Years	Player(s)	Goals
1993	(India) I. M. Vijayan	3
1995	(Sri Lanka) Mohamed Amanulla	3
1997	(India) I. M. Vijayan	6
1999	(Bangladesh) Mizanur Rahman Dawn	3
1999	(India) Bhaichung Bhutia	3
1999	(Maldives) Mohamed Wildhan	3
1999	(Nepal) Naresh Joshi	3
2003	(Pakistan) Sarfraz Rasool	4
2005	(Maldives) Ali Ashfaq	3
2005	(Maldives) Ibrahim Fazeel	3
2005	(Maldives) Ahmed Thariq	3
2008	(Afghanistan) Harez Habib	4
2009	(Bangladesh) Enamul Haque	4
2009	(Maldives) Ahmed Thariq	4
2009	(Sri Lanka) Channa Ediri Bandanage	4
2011	(India) Sunil Chhetri	7
2013	(Maldives) Ali Ashfaq	10
2015	(Afghanistan) Khaibar Amani	4
2018	(India) Manvir Singh	3
2018	(Pakistan) Hassan Bashir	3
2021	(India) Sunil Chhetri	5
2023	(India) Sunil Chhetri	5
2026	(India) Suhail Ahmad Bhat	4

=== Overall ===
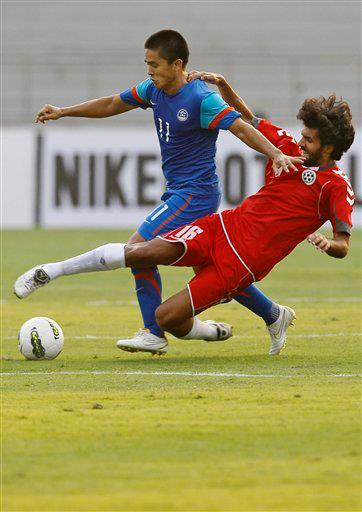
Sunil Chhetri at the 2011 SAFF Championship

As of 2026 SAFF Championship

Players with 10 or more goals
Rank	Nation	Player	Goals scored
1	(India)	Sunil Chhetri	23
1	(Maldives)	Ali Ashfaq	23
3	(India)	Bhaichung Bhutia	12
4	(Maldives)	Ibrahim Fazeel	10
4	(Maldives)	Ahmed Thariq	10

== Winning coaches ==
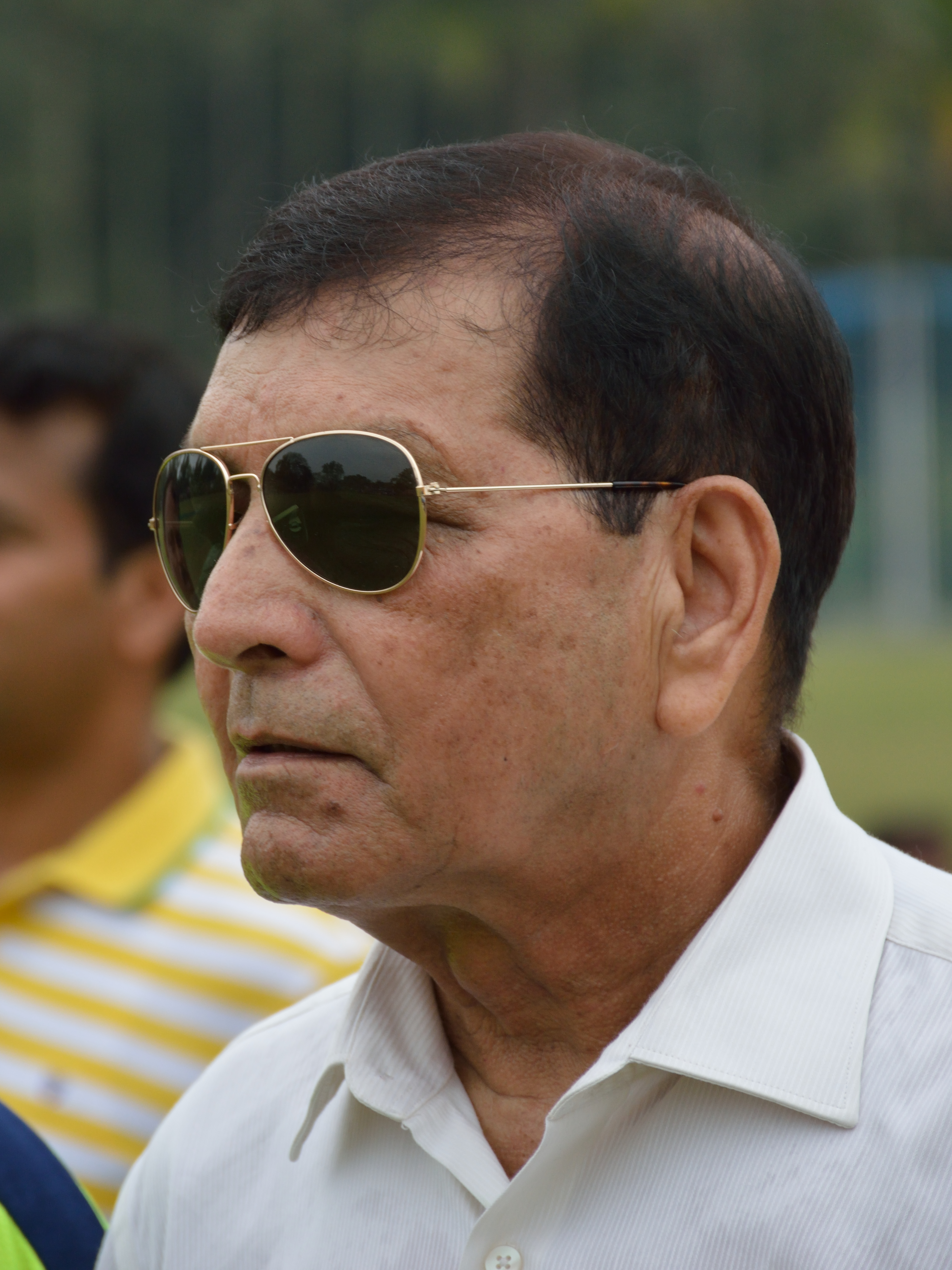
1. Syed Nayeemuddin

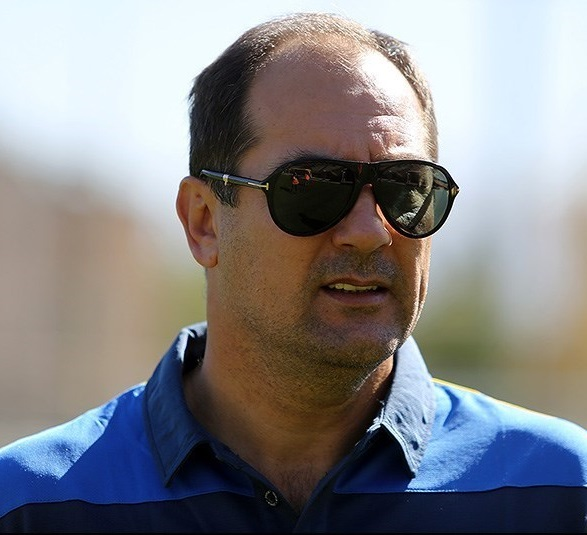
2. Igor Štimac

Both Syed Nayeemuddin and Igor Štimac won the SAFF Championship twice with the India national team.

Year	Team	Coach
1993	India	(Czech Republic) Jiří Pešek
1995	Sri Lanka	(Brazil) Jorge Ferreira
1997	India	(India) Syed Nayeemuddin
1999	India	(India) Sukhwinder Singh
2003	Bangladesh	(Austria) George Kottan
2005	India	(India) Syed Nayeemuddin (2)
2008	Maldives	(Slovakia) Jozef Jankech
2009	India U-23	(India) Sukhwinder Singh (2)
2011	India	(India) Savio Medeira
2013	Afghanistan	(Afghanistan) Yousef Kargar
2015	India	(England) Stephen Constantine
2018	Maldives	(Croatia) Petar Šegrt
2021	India	(Croatia) Igor Štimac
2023	India	(Croatia) Igor Štimac (2)
2026	India	(India) Naushad Moosa

== See also ==
- SAFF Women's Championship
- AFC Asian Cup
- Football at the Asian Games
- ASEAN Championship
- CAFA Nations Cup
- EAFF E-1 Football Championship
- WAFF Championship
- Sub-continental football championships in Asia
- Football at the South Asian Games
- SABA Championship
- CAVA Men's Volleyball Nations League
- SAFF U-20 Championship
- SAFF U-17 Championship
- SAFF U-20 Women's Championship
- SAFF U-17 Women's Championship
