= National Stadium, Dhaka =

Stadium and sports arena in Bangladesh

- জাতীয় স্টেডিয়াম, ঢাকা
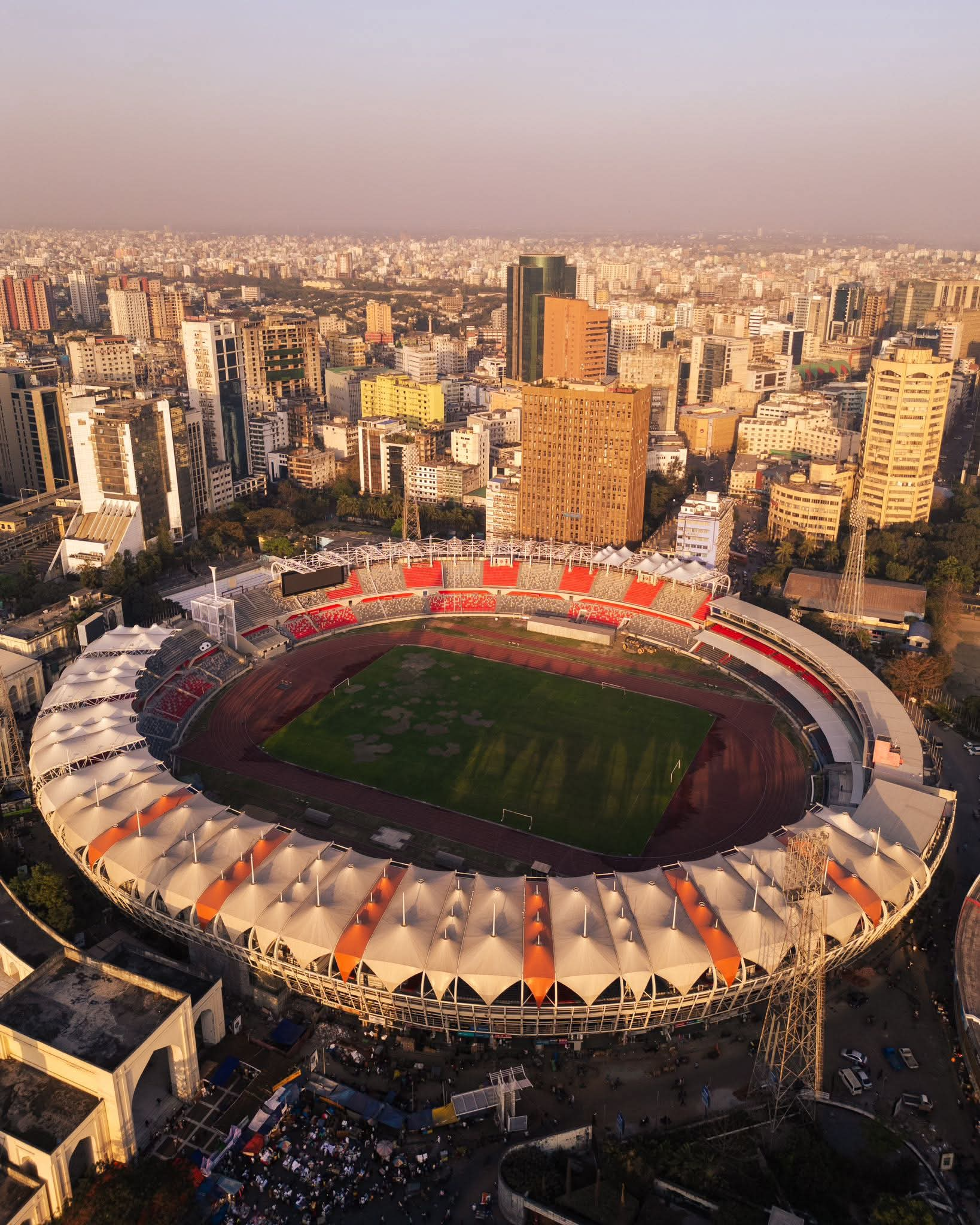
- National Stadium in 2025
- Interactive map of National Stadium, Dhaka
- Former names: Bangabandhu National Stadium (1998–2024); Dacca/Dhaka Stadium (1954–1997)
- Address: National Stadium Rd, Dhaka 1000; Dhaka; Bangladesh
- Location: Dhaka, Bangladesh
- Coordinates: 23°43′40.2″N 90°24′48.4″E
- Owner: National Sports Council
- Operator: National Sports Council; Bangladesh Football Federation
- Capacity: 22,400
- Type: Football Stadium
- Events: Sporting events, concerts
- Surface: GrassMaster
- Scoreboard: Yes
- Field size: 105 × 68 metres (Football); 170 x 157 metres (Playing Surface)
- Field shape: Circular

Construction
- Opened: 1954; 72 years ago
- Renovated: 1978, 2011, 2021–2023
- Reopened: 2025
- Cost: ৳96 crore (US$7.8 million) (2021 renovation)

Tenant
- Bangladesh national football team (1978–1993, 2005–present)

Ground information
- Tenants: Pakistan national cricket team (1955–1971); Bangladesh national cricket team (1988–2005)
- Last used: 31 January 2005

International information
- First men's Test: 1–4 January 1955: Pakistan v India
- Last men's Test: 14–18 January 2005: Bangladesh v Zimbabwe
- First men's ODI: 27 October 1988: Pakistan v Sri Lanka
- Last men's ODI: 31 January 2005: Bangladesh v Zimbabwe
- As of 28 October 2023; Source: ESPNCricinfo

National Stadium, Dhaka (Bengali: জাতীয় স্টেডিয়াম, ঢাকা) is a multipurpose sports arena and the national stadium of Bangladesh. Located in the Motijheel area of Dhaka, it is predominantly used for football matches and serves as the home venue for the Bangladesh national football team. The stadium is well known for hosting a high-profile international friendly between Argentina and Nigeria in 2011.

The stadium has undergone multiple renovations. Prior to the refurbishment for the opening ceremony of the 2011 Cricket World Cup, its capacity was nearly 55,000. Despite its reduced capacity of 36,000 after renovation, it was the largest stadium in Bangladesh. It was renovated again [2021-2025] and the capacity reduced to 22,400.

== History ==
=== Early history ===
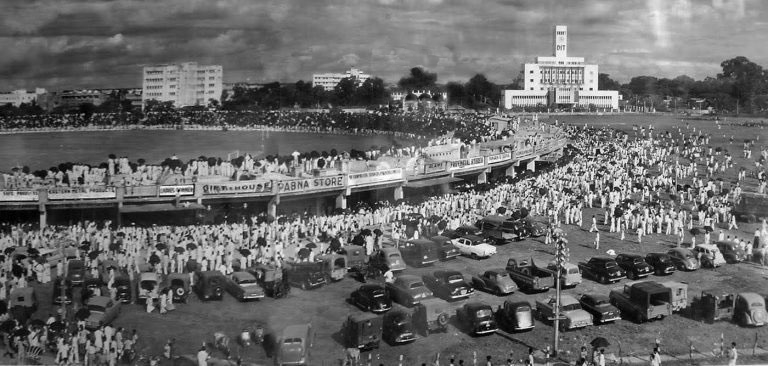
Dhaka Stadium in the late 1950s.

National Stadium, Dhaka, originally known as Dhaka Stadium, was built for cricket in 1954 on a vast empty land located to the northwest of the current Bangabhaban (the Presidential Palace). The stadium is the only venue worldwide to have hosted the inaugural home fixtures for two Test nations: Pakistan and Bangladesh. India were the visitors on both occasions: in 1954–55, when Dacca was the capital of East Pakistan, and in 1976–77, when the first unofficial Test match was held between Bangladesh against the touring MCC from England. And the following year the Sri Lankan national team visited Bangladesh to play a few one-day, two-day and three-day unofficial matches against BCCB XI and Bangladesh national team. After that teams like Deccan Blues from India and MCC toured Bangladesh several times to play against BCCB XI and Bangladesh national team respectively.

Alongside cricket, the stadium was also known to host the historic Dhaka First Division League, which was the country's premier football league even before independence of Bangladesh. In the 80s when football's popularity was skyrocketing, the Dhaka Derby attracted thousands of fans into the stadium from all over the country. The stadium regularly hosted the now defunct Aga Khan Gold Cup, which by many is considered to be first organised international competition that involved club teams around Asia.

The 1978 AFC Youth Championship marked the first major international tournament hosted by both the stadium and the country. The stadium underwent renovations for the occasion, and all 40 matches took place there, with Korea Republic and Iraq being crowned joint champions.

The stadium has a history of hosting number of historic sports event starting from cricket, football, hockey to boxing. In February 1978, boxer Muhammad Ali fought an exhibition boxing match at the stadium, the then Dacca Stadium, with a 12-year-old Bengali boy.

=== Home of Bangladesh football ===
With a purpose-built cricket stadium being constructed on the outskirts of the city, the ground was taken out of commission at the end of the 2004–05 season, and handed over for the sole use of the Bangladesh national football team. Other than being used for the 2011 Cricket World Cup opening ceremony, the stadium has been mainly used for football purposes since the turn of the decade. In March 2005, the Bangladesh Football Federation organised the Independence Day Gold Cup to mark its permanent possession of the stadium.

The stadium has hosted the SAFF Championship three times to date. First during the 2003 edition when Bangladesh lifted the trophy for the first time in history, in front of 46,000 local supporters. Since then the 2009 and most recently the 2018 editions of the tournament have all taken place at the stadium. Ever since the inception of the Bangladesh Premier League, in 2007, the stadium has been used to host majority of the league seasons.

On 6 September 2011, the stadium hosted an international friendly football match between the full-strength Argentina and Nigeria teams, featuring Lionel Messi, Sergio Agüero, Javier Mascherano and Mikel John Obi among the other star players of both nations. Argentina won 3–1 with goals from then-Real Madrid teammates Gonzalo Higuaín and Ángel Di María, and an own goal from Nigeria's Elderson Echiéjilé with Chinedu Obasi scoring Nigeria's lone goal. Bangladeshi referee Tayeb Shamsuzzaman officiated the game, which drew 25,000 spectators despite ticket prices starting at US$100.

On 13 November 2020, the stadium hosted the first of two matches between Bangladesh and Nepal during the Mujib Borsho Fifa International Football Series, arranged by the Bangladesh Football Federation. Bangladesh won the first game of the series 2–0, while the second game which was held four days later, finished goalless which lead the hosts to clinch the series on aggregate. The friendlies helped football return to the stadium and the country after a long absence due to the rise of COVID-19 cases worldwide.

After the fall of the Sheikh Hasina-led Awami League government through an uprising, Bangabandhu National Stadium was renamed to National Stadium, Dhaka.

== Refurbishment ==
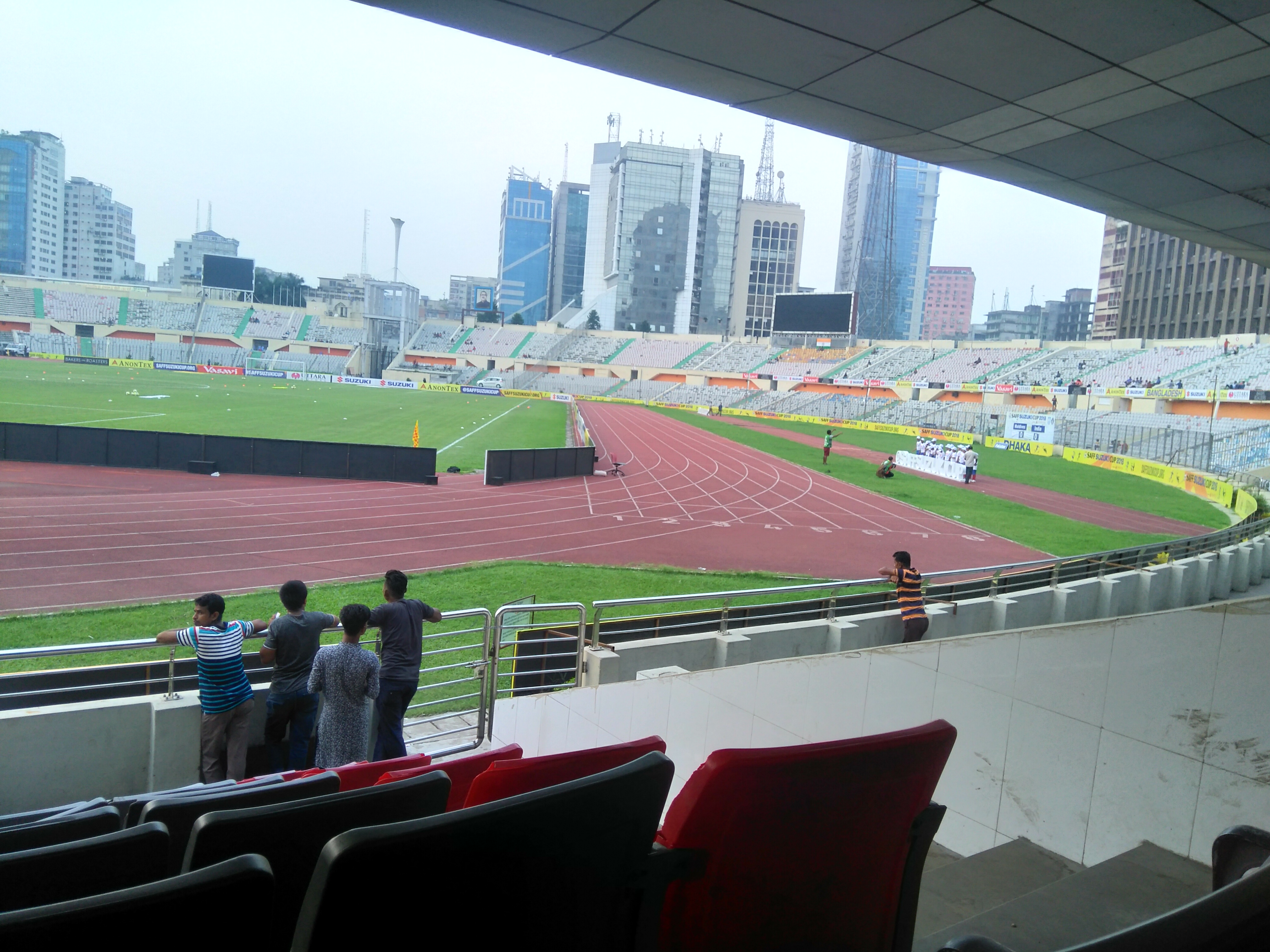
The stadium during 2018 SAFF Championship

The stadium underwent its initial renovation in preparation for the 1978 AFC Youth Championship, the country's first major international tournament hosting. With a budget of Tk 1.2cr, the East Gallery was constructed, and the country's first-ever women's gallery was added. Additionally, the VIP gallery received a redecoration. The newly renovated stadium hosted a total of forty games from played under floodlights.

The stadium hosted the opening ceremony of the 2011 Cricket World Cup co-hosted by Bangladesh, Sri Lanka and India on 17 February 2011. The stadium was exclusively modernised and renovated for the opening ceremony. The capacity of the stadium had been decreased to 36,000, a large LED screen had been installed, a modern roof had also been attached over the press box. The entrances and VIP box have also been upgraded to host the grand gala inaugural ceremony. The press box, along with a refreshment stand and the VIP box have been revamped. The stadium now has state of the art facilities suitable for international sporting events.

From September 2021, the stadium underwent a year-long renovation process scheduled to conclude in early 2023. The Bangladesh Football Federation has planned to host future football-related events at the venue, transforming it into a modernized football facility. The renovation includes field development, construction of sheds in galleries, installation of chairs in galleries, modernization of toilets for international and local players, installation of floodlights, CCTV cameras, generators, LED giant screens, new athletic tracks, digital advertising boards, media centers, ticket counters, Dope Test Room Building, Medical Room, VIP Box Construction, President's Box, Toilet development, medical equipment, sub-station equipment, AC, and solar panel supply.

== International football ==
=== 2026 SAFF Championship ===
The stadium was the venue for the 2026 SAFF Championship.

Date	Competition	Team	Result	Team	Attendance
17 November 2026	Finals	India	2–1	Pakistan	9,348
14 November 2026	Semi-finals	Bangladesh	0–1	Pakistan	21,983
14 November 2026	Semi-finals	India	2–1	Bhutan	1,700
11 November 2026	Group B	India	1–0	Maldives	1,969
11 November 2026	Group A	Bangladesh	4–0	Sri Lanka	18,631
8 November 2026	Group B	Maldives	0–3	Pakistan	203
8 November 2026	Group A	Sri Lanka	2–2	Bhutan	1,012
5 November 2026	Group B	Pakistan	2–3	India	2,300
5 November 2026	Group A	Bangladesh	1–0	Bhutan	12,783

=== 2018 SAFF Championship ===
The stadium was the venue for the 2018 SAFF Championship.

Date	Competition	Team	Result	Team	Attendance
15 September 2018	Finals	Maldives	2–1	India	N/A
12 September 2018	Semi-finals	India	3–1	Pakistan	N/A
12 September 2018	Semi-finals	Nepal	0–3	Maldives	N/A
9 September 2018	Group B	India	2–0	Maldives	N/A
8 September 2018	Group A	Bangladesh	0–2	Nepal	N/A
8 September 2018	Group A	Pakistan	3–0	Bhutan	N/A
7 September 2018	Group B	Maldives	0–0	Sri Lanka	N/A
6 September 2018	Group A	Bangladesh	1–0	Pakistan	N/A
6 September 2018	Group A	Nepal	4–0	Bhutan	N/A
5 September 2018	Group B	India	2–0	Sri Lanka	N/A
4 September 2018	Group A	Bangladesh	2–0	Bhutan	N/A
4 September 2018	Group A	Nepal	1–2	Pakistan	N/A

=== 2009 SAFF Championship ===
The stadium was the venue for the 2009 SAFF Championship.

Date	Competition	Team	Res	Team	Attendance
13 December 2009	Finals	Maldives	0(1)–0(3) (pens)	India U-23	N/A
11 December 2009	Semi-finals	Bangladesh	0–1	India U-23	N/A
11 December 2009	Semi-finals	Maldives	5–1	Nepal	N/A
9 December 2009	Group A	Maldives	0–3	India U-23	N/A
9 December 2009	Group A	Afghanistan	0–3	Nepal	N/A
8 December 2009	Group B	Pakistan	7–0	Bhutan	N/A
7 December 2009	Group A	India U-23	1–0	Nepal	N/A
7 December 2009	Group B	Maldives	0–0	Nepal	N/A
7 December 2009	Group A	Maldives	3–1	Afghanistan	N/A
6 December 2009	Group B	Bangladesh	0–0	Pakistan	N/A
6 December 2009	Group B	Sri Lanka	6–0	Bhutan	N/A
5 December 2009	Group A	India U-23	1–0	Afghanistan	N/A
5 December 2009	Group A	Nepal	1–1	Maldives	N/A
4 December 2009	Group B	Bangladesh	4–1	Bhutan	N/A
4 December 2009	Group B	Sri Lanka	1–0	Pakistan	N/A

=== 2003 SAFF Gold Cup ===
The stadium was the venue for the 2003 SAFF Gold Cup.

Date	Competition	Team	Res	Team	Attendance
20 January 2003	Finals	Bangladesh	1(5)–1(3) (pens)	Maldives	46,000
20 January 2003	Third-place match	India	2–1 (a.s.d.e.t.)	Pakistan	N/A
18 January 2003	Semi-finals	Bangladesh	2–1 (a.s.d.e.t.)	India	N/A
18 January 2003	Semi-finals	Maldives	2–1	Pakistan	N/A
15 January 2003	Group B	Bangladesh	3–0	Bhutan	15,000
15 January 2003	Group B	Nepal	2–3	Maldives	15,000
14 January 2003	Group A	India	1–1	Sri Lanka	N/A
14 January 2003	Group A	Pakistan	1–0	Afghanistan	N/A
13 January 2003	Group B	Bangladesh	1–0	Maldives	20,000
13 January 2003	Group B	Nepal	2–0	Bhutan	N/A
12 January 2003	Group A	India	4–0	Afghanistan	N/A
12 January 2003	Group A	Pakistan	6–0	Sri Lanka	N/A
11 January 2003	Group B	Bangladesh	1–0	Nepal	55,000
11 January 2003	Group B	Maldives	6–0	Bhutan	25,000
10 January 2003	Group A	Sri Lanka	1–0	Afghanistan	N/A
10 January 2003	Group A	India	0–1	Pakistan	N/A

=== 1955 Asian Quadrangular Football Tournament ===
The stadium was the venue for the 1955 Asian Quadrangular Cup.

Date	Competition	Team	Res	Team	Attendance
17 December 1955	Round Robin	Pakistan	4–2	Burma	N/A
18 December 1955	Round Robin	India	4–3	Ceylon	N/A
20 December 1955	Round Robin	India	5–2	Burma	N/A
21 December 1955	Round Robin	Pakistan	2–1	Ceylon	N/A
23 December 1955	Round Robin	Burma	3–1	Ceylon	N/A
24 December 1955	Round Robin	Pakistan	1–2	India	N/A

== Bangladesh Premier League ==
Edition	Season	Tenants	Matches played	Source
1st	2007	Abahani Limited Dhaka; Arambagh KS; Brothers Union; Farashganj SC; Mohammedan SC; Muktijoddha Sangsad KC; Rahmatganj MFS; Sheikh Russel KC	81	
2nd	2008–09	Abahani Limited Dhaka; Arambagh KS; Brothers Union; Farashganj SC; Mohammedan SC; Muktijoddha Sangsad KC; Rahmatganj MFS; Sheikh Russel KC	80	
3rd	2009–10	Abahani Limited Dhaka; Arambagh KS; Brothers Union; Farashganj SC; Mohammedan SC; Muktijoddha Sangsad KC; Rahmatganj MFS; Sheikh Russel KC	74	
4th	2010–11	The stadium was not used for the fourth edition of the league.		
5th	2012	Abahani Limited Dhaka; Arambagh KS; Brothers Union; Farashganj SC; Mohammedan SC; Muktijoddha Sangsad KC; Rahmatganj MFS; Sheikh Russel KC; Sheikh Jamal Dhanmondi Club	86	
6th	2012–13	Abahani Limited Dhaka; Arambagh KS; Brothers Union; Mohammedan SC; Muktijoddha Sangsad KC; Sheikh Russel KC; Sheikh Jamal Dhanmondi Club; Team BJMC	56	
7th	2013–14	Abahani Limited Dhaka; Brothers Union; Feni Soccer Club; Mohammedan SC; Sheikh Russel KC; Sheikh Jamal Dhanmondi Club; Team BJMC; Uttar Baridhara	119	
8th	2014–15	Abahani Limited Dhaka; Brothers Union; Farashganj SC; Mohammedan SC; Sheikh Russel KC; Sheikh Jamal Dhanmondi Club; Team BJMC	90	
9th	2016	No permanent tenant.	62	
10th	2017–18	No permanent tenant.	132	
11th	2018–19	Abahani Limited Dhaka; Brothers Union; Chittagong Abahani; Mohammedan SC; Rahmatganj MFS; Sheikh Russel KC; Sheikh Jamal Dhanmondi Club; Team BJMC	72	
12th	2019–20	Abahani Limited Dhaka; Bangladesh Police; Brothers Union; Rahmatganj MFS; Sheikh Jamal Dhanmondi Club; Team BJMC; Uttar Baridhara	22	
13th	2020–21	Bangladesh Police; Brothers Union; Chittagong Abahani; Muktijoddha Sangsad KC; Rahmatganj MFS; Saif Sporting Club; Sheikh Russel KC; Sheikh Jamal Dhanmondi Club	125	
14th	2021–22	Under renovation.		
15th	2022–23	Under renovation.		

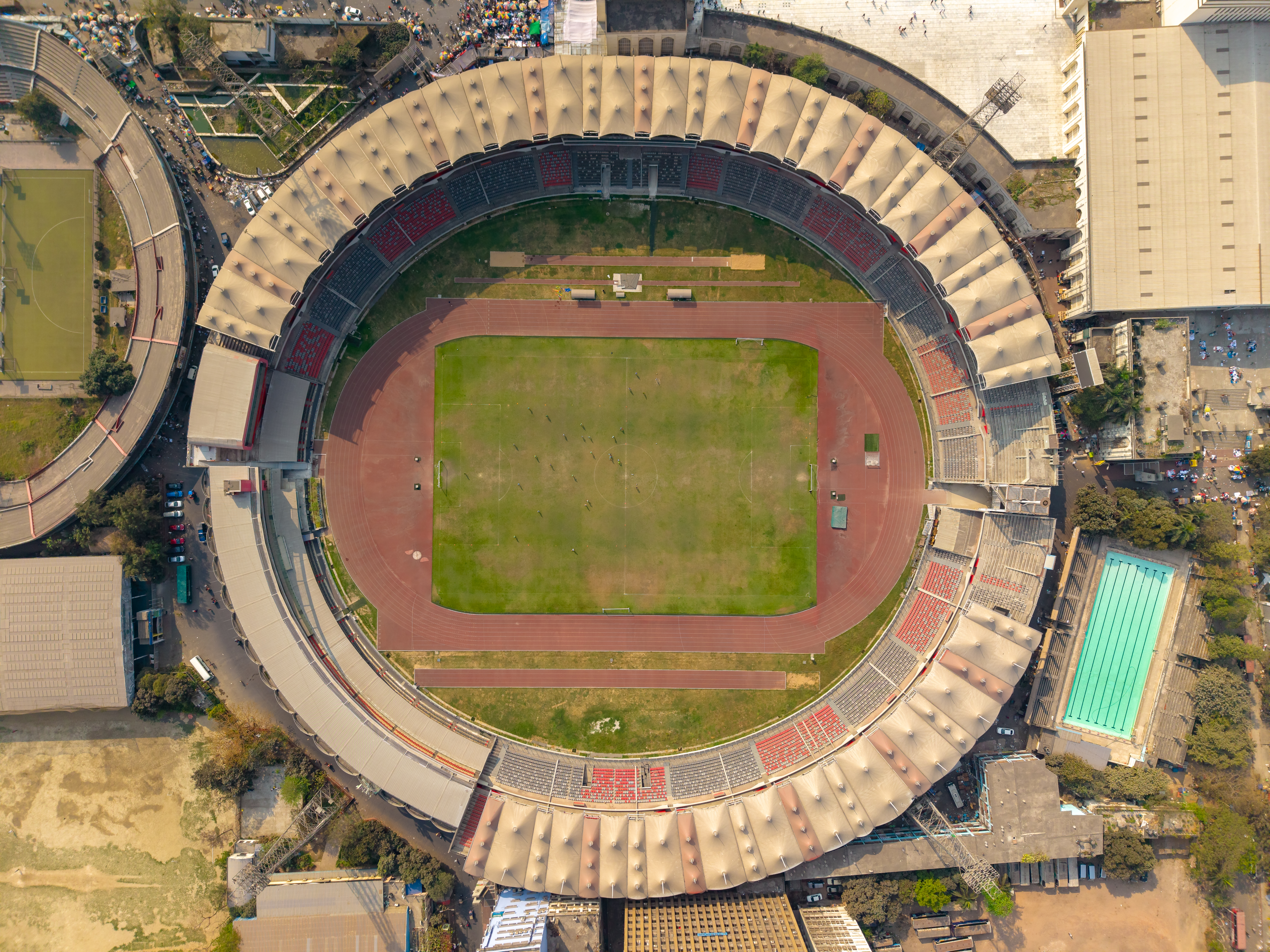
National Stadium, Dhaka

== See also ==
- Bangladesh women's national football team
- Bangladesh national under-23 football team
- Bangladesh national under-20 football team
- Bangladesh national under-17 football team
- Bangladesh Premier League
- List of football stadiums in Bangladesh
- Stadiums in Bangladesh
