= 2026 Diamond Jubilee International Football Tournament squads =

Squads for the 2026 Diamond Jubilee International Football Tournament

The following squads were announced for the 2026 Diamond Jubilee International Football Tournament hosted by the Maldives.

== Squads ==
=== Afghanistan ===
The final list of 23-member players invited to the Afghanistan national soccer team for the four-way tournament in Maldives.

Head coach: (Brazil) Antonio Nogueira

Note: Flags indicate national team as defined under FIFA eligibility rules; some limited exceptions apply. Players may hold more than one non-FIFA nationality.

No.	Pos.	Nation	Player
1		AFG	Faisal Hamidi
2		AFG	Nawid Mahbobi
3		AFG	Amid Arezou
4		AFG	Mahboob Hanifi
5		AFG	Ahmad Shakib Mehri
6		AFG	Habibullah Askar
7		AFG	Mosawwer Ahadi
8		AFG	Rahmat Akbari
9		AFG	Roman Fazi
10		AFG	Omid Musawi
11		AFG	Maziar Kouhyar
12		AFG	Elias Mansor

No.	Pos.	Nation	Player
13		AFG	Hamed Mumand
14		AFG	Ali Reza Panahi
15		AFG	Amin Nabizada
16		AFG	Sahel Sarwari
17		AFG	Yaser Safi
18		AFG	Jamshed Achakzai
19		AFG	Omid Popalzay
20		AFG	Mostafa Omerkhil
21		AFG	Ali Rayez Muradi
22		AFG	Ali Sina Hakimi
23		AFG	Keyvan Mottaghian

=== Bangladesh Olympic ===
Bangladesh announced a 23-player final Olympic squad.

Head coach: (Bangladesh) Maruful Haque

Note: Flags indicate national team as defined under FIFA eligibility rules; some limited exceptions apply. Players may hold more than one non-FIFA nationality.

No.	Pos.	Nation	Player
1	GK	BAN	Md Mehedi Hasan Srabon
2	DF	BAN	Ismail Hossain
3	DF	BAN	Md. Mithu Chowdhury
4	DF	BAN	Md. Rasel Hossain
5	DF	BAN	SM Monjurur Rahman (C)
6	MF	BAN	Md Manik Hossain Molla
7	FW	BAN	Md Rabby Hossen Rahul
8	MF	BAN	Nazmul Huda Faysal
9	FW	BAN	Sourav Dewan
10	MF	BAN	Md Mojibor Rahman Jony
11	FW	BAN	Md Mursed Ali
12	FW	BAN	Sajed Hasan Jummon

No.	Pos.	Nation	Player
13	GK	BAN	Md Asif
14	DF	BAN	Md. Jahid Hassan
15	DF	BAN	Md Abdulla Omar
16	MF	BAN	Md Safiul Hossain
17	FW	BAN	Md Moinul Islam Moin
18	MF	BAN	Iftiar Hossain
19	FW	BAN	Md Pias Ahmmed Nova
20	FW	BAN	Al Amin
21	FW	BAN	Mirajul Islam
22	DF	BAN	Pronoy Enosent
23	GK	BAN	Md. Ishaque Akando

=== Maldives ===
Maldives announced their final 23-man squad for the tournament.

Head coach: (Hungary) István Urbányi

Note: Flags indicate national team as defined under FIFA eligibility rules; some limited exceptions apply. Players may hold more than one non-FIFA nationality.

No.	Pos.	Nation	Player
1	GK	MDV	Hussain Shareef
2	DF	MDV	Ahmed Aiham
3	DF	MDV	Thoif Gasim
4	DF	MDV	Hussain Sifaau
5	FW	MDV	Nassah Ibrahim Nasir
6	DF	MDV	Nashiu Ahmed Shiham
7	FW	MDV	Ali Ashfaq
8	MF	MDV	Aisam Ibrahim
9	FW	MDV	Naiz Hassan
10	MF	MDV	Hamza Mohamed
11	FW	MDV	Ali Fasir
12	FW	MDV	Abdullah Looth Ibrahim
13	DF	MDV	Ahmed Abdulla

No.	Pos.	Nation	Player
14	DF	MDV	Haisham Hassan
15	DF	MDV	Amdhan Ali
16	MF	MDV	Ahzam Rasheed
17	MF	MDV	Ibrahim Mahudhee Hussain
18	GK	MDV	Mohamed Shafeeu
19	FW	MDV	Mohamed Ilan Imran
20	DF	MDV	Hassan Eenaaz
21	MF	MDV	Ibrahim Waheed Hassan
22	GK	MDV	Mohamed Faisal
23	MF	MDV	Ahmed Aiham

=== Pakistan ===
Pakistan finalized a 23-player final squad for the tournament in Maldives.

Head coach: (Peru) Nolberto Solano

Note: Flags indicate national team as defined under FIFA eligibility rules; some limited exceptions apply. Players may hold more than one non-FIFA nationality.

No.	Pos.	Nation	Player
1	GK	PAK	Yousuf Butt
2	DF	PAK	Ali Khan Niazi
3	DF	PAK	Mohammad Fazal
4	DF	PAK	Abdullah Iqbal (C)
5	DF	PAK	Easah Suliman
6	DF	PAK	Mamoon Moosa Khan
7	MF	PAK	Otis Khan
8	MF	PAK	Rahis Nabi
9	FW	PAK	Ali Khan
10	MF	PAK	Adil Nabi
11	FW	PAK	Shayak Dost
12	DF	PAK	Haris Zeb

No.	Pos.	Nation	Player
13	DF	PAK	Mohib Ullah
14	FW	PAK	Ali Haider Shah
15	DF	PAK	Abdullah Shah
16	FW	PAK	Abdul Arshad
17	MF	PAK	Ali Agha
18	FW	PAK	Umar Nawaz
19	MF	PAK	Hayyaan Khattak
20	GK	PAK	Saqib Hanif
21	MF	PAK	Alamgir Ghazi
22	GK	PAK	Hassan Ali
23	FW	PAK	Harun Hamid
