= Pakistan national football team results (2020–present) =

The following are the Pakistan national football team results in its official international matches from 2020 to present.

== Results ==
Key
| Win |
| Draw |
| Defeat |

=== 2022 ===
| 16 November 2022 Friendly | Nepal | 1–0 | Pakistan | Kathmandu, Nepal |
| | Bista 83' | Report | | Stadium: Dasharath Rangasala |

=== 2023 ===
| 21 March 2023 Friendly | Maldives | 1–0 | Pakistan | Gan, Maldives |
| 16:00 UTC+5 | Aisam 20' | | | Stadium: Laamu Gan Zone Stadium |

| 11 June 2023 2023 Mauritius Four Nations Cup | Mauritius | 3–0 | Pakistan | Belle Vue Harel, Mauritius |
| 15:30 | Villeneuve 53'; Nazira 63'; Moosa 71' (o.g.) | Report | | Stadium: Anjalay Stadium |

| 14 June 2023 2023 Mauritius Four Nations Cup | Pakistan | 0–1 | Kenya | Belle Vue Harel, Mauritius |
| 18:30 | | | Moses 17' | Stadium: Anjalay Stadium |

| 17 June 2023 2023 Mauritius Four Nations Cup | Djibouti | 3–1 | Pakistan | Belle Vue Harel, Mauritius |
| 18:00 | Elabeh 10'; Dadzie 73'; Akinbinu 86' | | Hayat 85' | Stadium: Anjalay Stadium |

| 21 June 2023 2023 SAFF Championship | India | 4–0 | Pakistan | Bengaluru, India |
| 19:30 UTC+5:30 | Chhetri 10', 16' (pen.), 73' (pen.); Udanta 81' | Report | | Stadium: Sree Kanteerava Stadium; Attendance: 22,860; Referee: Prajwol Chhetri (Nepal) |

| 24 June 2023 2023 SAFF Championship | Pakistan | 0–4 | Kuwait | Bengaluru, India |
| 15:30 UTC+5:30 | | | Al-Enezi 10'; Al-Faneeni 17', 45+1'; Al-Rasheedi 69' | Stadium: Sree Kanteerava Stadium; Attendance: 309; Referee: Pema Tshewang (Bhutan) |

| 27 June 2023 2023 SAFF Championship | Nepal | 1–0 | Pakistan | Bengaluru, India |
| 15:30 UTC+5:30 | Chaudhary 80' | | | Stadium: Sree Kanteerava Stadium; Attendance: 250; Referee: Sinan Hussain (Maldives) |

| 12 October 2023 2026 FIFA WCQ – AFC first round | Cambodia | 0–0 | Pakistan | Phnom Penh, Cambodia |
| 19:00 UTC+7 | | Report | | Stadium: Morodok Techo National Stadium; Attendance: 11,718; Referee: Baraa Aisha (Palestine) |

| 17 October 2023 2026 FIFA WCQ – AFC first round | Pakistan | 1–0 | Cambodia | Islamabad, Pakistan |
| 14:00 UTC+5 | Hamid 68' | Report | | Stadium: Jinnah Sports Stadium; Attendance: 13,152; Referee: Feras Taweel (Syria) |

| 16 November 2023 2026 FIFA WCQ – AFC second round | Saudi Arabia | 4–0 | Pakistan | Hofuf, Saudi Arabia |
| 19:30 UTC+3 | Al-Shehri 6', 48' (pen.); Ghareeb 90+1'; Radif 90+6' | Report | | Stadium: Prince Abdullah bin Jalawi Stadium; Attendance: 11,150; Referee: Hanna Hattab (Syria) |

| 21 November 2023 2026 FIFA WCQ – AFC second round | Pakistan | 1–6 | Tajikistan | Islamabad, Pakistan |
| 15:00 UTC+5 | Nabi 21' | Report | Kamolov 9', 66'; Soirov 13'; Umarbayev 26'; Panjshanbe 45'; Samiev 90' | Stadium: Jinnah Sports Stadium; Attendance: 18,316; Referee: Yusuke Araki (Japan) |

=== 2024 ===
| 21 March 2024 2026 World Cup qualification | Pakistan | 0–3 | Jordan | Islamabad, Pakistan |
| 15:00 UTC+5 | | Report | Al-Taamari 2', 86'; Olwan 9' | Stadium: Jinnah Sports Stadium; Attendance: 9,625; Referee: Rustam Lutfullin (Uzbekistan) |

| 26 March 2024 2026 World Cup qualification | Jordan | 7–0 | Pakistan | Amman, Jordan |
| 21:00 UTC+3 | Al-Taamari 15', 62', 79'; Al-Naimat 28'; Al-Rosan 52'; Olwan 75'; Abu Zraiq 83' | Report | | Stadium: Amman International Stadium; Attendance: 14,695; Referee: Nivon Robesh (Sri Lanka) |

| 6 June 2024 2026 World Cup qualification | Pakistan | 0–3 | Saudi Arabia | Islamabad, Pakistan |
| 20:30 UTC+5 | | Report | Al-Buraikan 26', 41'; Al-Juwayr 59' | Stadium: Jinnah Sports Stadium; Attendance: 20,124; Referee: Ammar Mahfoodh (Bahrain) |

| 11 June 2024 2026 World Cup qualification | Tajikistan | 3–0 | Pakistan | Dushanbe, Tajikistan |
| 20:00 UTC+5 | Mabatshoev 35'; Safarov 65'; Hanonov 70' | Report | | Stadium: Pamir Stadium; Attendance: 7,800; Referee: Mooud Bonyadifard (Iran) |

=== 2025 ===
| 25 March 2025 2027 AFC Asian Cup qualification | Syria | 2–0 | Pakistan | Al Hofuf, Saudi Arabia (Note: Syria played their home matches at a neutral venue due to the ongoing Syrian civil war.) |
| 21:00 UTC+3 | Faqa 23'; Al Somah 56' | | | Stadium: Prince Abdullah bin Jalawi Stadium |

| 10 June 2025 2027 AFC Asian Cup qualification | Myanmar | 1–0 | Pakistan | Yangon, Myanmar |
| 17:00 UTC+6:30 | Than Paing 41' | Report | | Stadium: Thuwunna Stadium; Attendance: 22,000; Referee: Zhang Lei (China) |

| 9 October 2025 2027 AFC Asian Cup qualification | Pakistan | 0–0 | Afghanistan | Islamabad, Pakistan |
| 14:00 5:00 | | Report; Report (AFC) | | Stadium: Jinnah Sports Stadium; Attendance: 7,375; Referee: Mohammed Al-Shammari (Qatar) |

| 14 October 2025 2027 AFC Asian Cup qualification | Afghanistan | 1–1 | Pakistan | Farwaniya, Kuwait |
| 20:00 8:00 | Hanifi 5' | Report; Report (AFC) | Hussain 29' | Stadium: Ali Sabah Al-Salem Stadium; Attendance: 750; Referee: Abdullo Davlatov (Tajikistan) |

| 18 November 2025 2027 AFC Asian Cup qualification | Pakistan | 0–5 | Syria | Islamabad, Pakistan |
| 14:00 UTC+5 | | Report; Report (AFC) | Al Hallaq 34', 47'; Samia 79', 90+4'; Al Dali 90' | Stadium: Jinnah Sports Stadium; Attendance: 7,124; Referee: Virendha Rai (Bhutan) |

=== 2026 ===
| 31 March 2026 2027 AFC Asian Cup qualification | Pakistan | 1–2 | Myanmar | Islamabad, Pakistan |
| | S. Dost 90' | Report | Saqib Hanif 46' (o.g.); Than Paing 59' | Stadium: Jinnah Sports Stadium; Referee: Firdavs Nosafarov (Uzbekistan) |

| 4 June 2026 Diamond Jubilee Football Tournament | Maldives | 0–3 | Pakistan | Malé, Maldives |
| 16:00 UTC+5:30 | | Report | Nawaz 53'; Arshad 84'; Hamid 87' | Stadium: National Football Stadium; Attendance: 1050; Referee: Ashwin Kumar (India) |

| 7 June 2026 Diamond Jubilee Football Tournament | Pakistan | 2–0 | Afghanistan | Malé, Maldives |
| 16:00 UTC+5:30 | Nawaz 5'; Hamid 90+2' | Report | | Stadium: National Football Stadium; Attendance: 450; Referee: Hussain Sinan (Maldives) |

| 10 June 2026 Diamond Jubilee Tournament Final | Pakistan | 2–0 | Afghanistan | Malé, Maldives |
| 21:00 UTC+5:30 | Shayak 24'; Hamid 90+4' | Report | | Stadium: National Football Stadium; Attendance: 273; Referee: Aditya Purkayastha (India) |

| 26 September 2026 ASEAN Cup Group B | Pakistan | 0–4 | Thailand | Bandung, Indonesia |
| | | Report | Teerasak 31', 84'; Soonsup-Bell 41'; Zeb 64' (o.g.) | Stadium: Si Jalak Harupat Stadium; Referee: Kim Hee-gon (South Korea) |

| 29 September 2026 ASEAN Cup Group B | Philippines | 2–2 | Pakistan | Bandung, Indonesia |
| | Reyes 24'; Kristensen 32' (pen.) | Report | Khan 47'; Arshad 62' | Stadium: Si Jalak Harupat Stadium; Referee: Abdurashid Khudoyberganov (Uzbekistan) |

| 2 October 2026 ASEAN Cup Group B | Vietnam | 4–2 | Pakistan | Jakarta, Indonesia |
| | Nguyễn Hai Long 50'; Nguyễn Hoàng Đức 57'; Nguyễn Đình Bắc 80'; Williams Minh Hoàng 90+1' | Report | Mohib 31'; Kaleemullah 88' | Stadium: Gelora Bung Karno Stadium; Referee: Muhammad Taqi (Singapore) |

| 5 November 2026 SAFF Championship Group B | India | 3–2 | Pakistan | Dhaka, Bangladesh |
| 15:00 +6:00 | Suhail 13', 19'; Kipgen 32' | SAFF; FIFA | Najeeb 90+1'; Ghazi 90+4' | Stadium: National Stadium; Attendance: 2,300; Referee: Ngô Duy Lân (Vietnam) |

| 8 November 2026 SAFF Championship Group B | Pakistan | 3–0 | Maldives | Dhaka, Bangladesh |
| 15:00 +6:00 | M. Abdullah 3' (pen.); Najeeb 8', 23' | SAFF; FIFA | | Stadium: National Stadium; Attendance: 203; Referee: Ahmad A'Qashah (Singapore) |

| 14 November 2026 SAFF Championship Semi-finals | Bangladesh | 0–1 | Pakistan | Dhaka, Bangladesh |
| 20:30 +6:00 | | Report | Arshad 86' | Stadium: National Stadium; Attendance: 21,983; Referee: Ngô Duy Lân (Vietnam) |

| 17 November 2026 SAFF Championship | India | 2–1 | Pakistan | Dhaka, Bangladesh |
| 20:00 +6:00 | Bhat 61'; Mandi 88' | Report | Ghazi 45+1' | Stadium: National Stadium; Attendance: 9,348; Referee: Mohammed Khalfan Al Manai (Oman) |
