= Mansor =

Mansor is a surname. Notable people with the surname include:

- Azhar Mansor (born 1958), the first Malaysian solo sailor
- Elias Mansor (born 2006), Afghan footballer
- Shaziman Abu Mansor (born 1964), Malaysian UMNO politician, Works Minister of Malaysia
- Tengku Adnan Tengku Mansor (born 1950), Malaysian politician

== See also ==
- Sultan Mansor Shah Secondary School (SMSS) (known as SMKSMS) was founded on January 1, 1965
