= Mohammad Fazal =

Pakistani footballer (born 2002)

Personal information
- Date of birth: 29 May 2002 (age 24)
- Place of birth: Herlev, Denmark
- Height: 1.73 m (5 ft 8 in)
- Position: Left-back

Team information
- Current team: Nordic United
- Number: 3

Youth career
- 2018–2019: FC Roskilde
- 2019–2021: Lyngby

Senior career*
Years	Team	Apps	(Gls)
2021–2023	J-Södra	22	(2)
2023–2024	Nordic United	33	(3)
2024–2025	IMT	0	(0)
2025–	Nordic United	42	(1)

International career^{‡}
2018	Denmark U17	1	(0)
2019	Denmark U19	5	(0)
2024–	Pakistan	11	(0)
- * Club domestic league appearances and goals as of 12 November 2026 ‡ National team caps and goals as of 29 September 2026

Mohammad Fazal (Urdu: محمد فضل; born 29 May 2002) is a professional footballer who plays as a left-back for Superettan club Nordic United. Born in Denmark, he represents Pakistan at international level.

== Club career ==
=== Early career ===
Fazal started his youth career with FC Roskilde, subsequently moving to the club's under-19 team. He was scouted by Inter Milan in November 2018 at the age of 16 and was invited for trials. The following year he was transferred to Lyngby BK under-19 team.

=== J-Södra ===
Fazal moved to Sweden in 2021 and there his spent two years in the second tier Superettan division with J-Sodra IF. In the 2022 Supperettan, he made 15 appearances and scored two goals.

=== Nordic United ===
Fazal moved to third tier Ettan Fotboll club Nordic United in February 2023. In his first season, he made 24 appearances for the club in the league and made one appearance in the cup competition Svenska Cupen.

=== IMT ===
On 20 July 2024, he signed with newly promoted Serbian top-tier club IMT, on a one-year contract, with the possibility of an extension for another year.

== International career ==
Fazal represented Denmark at U16 and U19 level.

In 2023, he was contacted by Pakistan national team coach Shahzad Anwar. He also acquired Swedish citizenship in following years, which made him eligible to represent Denmark, Pakistan, and Sweden. After finalising his documents, he received a call-up from Pakistan in March 2024 for the 2026 FIFA World Cup qualification, however he left the training due to a hamstring injury. He made his senior international debut on 6 June 2024 in a 0–3 home defeat against Saudi Arabia.

== Career statistics ==
=== Club ===
As of 25 June 2025

Appearances and goals by club, season and competition
Club	Season	League			National cup		Europe		Total	
Club	Season	Division	Apps	Goals	Apps	Goals	Apps	Goals	Apps	Goals
J-Sodra	2021	Superettan	7	0	1	0	—		8	0
J-Sodra	2022	Superettan	15	2	0	0			15	2
Nordic United	2023	Ettan	24	0	2	0	—		26	0
Nordic United	2024	Ettan	8	3	2	0			10	3
Nordic United	2025	Ettan	11	1	1	0			11	1
Career total			64	6	6	0	0	0	70	6

=== International ===
As of 29 September 2026

Appearances and goals by national team and year
National team	Year	Apps	Goals
Pakistan	2024	2	0
Pakistan	2025	4	0
Pakistan	2026	5	0
Total		11	0

== Honours ==
Nordic United

- Ettan Fotboll: 2025

Pakistan

- Diamond Jubilee International Football Tournament: 2026

== See also ==
- List of Pakistan international footballers born outside Pakistan
