= Ali Khan (footballer) =

Pakistan international footballer (born 2001)

Personal information
- Full name: Muhammad Ali Akbar Khan
- Date of birth: 16 March 2001 (age 25)
- Place of birth: Järfälla, Sweden
- Height: 1.90 m (6 ft 3 in)
- Positions: Winger; forward

Team information
- Current team: Vasalund IF
- Number: 11

Youth career
- Bele Barkarby FF
- 2019–2020: Djurgårdens IF

Senior career*
Years	Team	Apps	(Gls)
2021	Tyresö FF		
2022–2023	FC Järfälla		
2024–2025	Karlbergs BK	52	(7)
2026–	Vasalund IF	18	(6)

International career^{‡}
2026–	Pakistan	3	(1)
- * Club domestic league appearances and goals as of 21 September 2026 ‡ National team caps and goals as of 2 October 2026

Muhammad Ali Akbar Khan (Urdu: محمد علی اکبر خان; born 16 March 2001), is a footballer who plays as a winger for Ettan club Vasalund IF. Born in Sweden, he represents the Pakistan national football team.

== Club career ==
=== Early career and Djurgårdens IF ===
Khan began his development with Bele Barkarby FF before joining the academy of Djurgårdens IF. He represented Djurgården at under-19 and under-21 level.

In February 2020, Khan scored twice as Djurgården's under-19 side defeated IK Sirius 3–1 in the Ligacupen. He also scored in a 3–1 victory against FC Djursholm in June.

On 29 July 2020, Khan started for a Djurgården side composed of first-team and academy players in a friendly against IK Sirius at Kaknäs IP. He opened the scoring in the 25th minute as the match finished 1–1.

Khan left Djurgården for Tyresö FF in 2021 before moving to FC Järfälla the following year.

=== FC Järfälla ===
Khan joined FC Järfälla in 2022. During the 2023 season he developed into one of the club's main attacking players, recording 14 goals and 14 assists.

On 18 May 2023, he scored the only goal in Järfälla's 1–0 league victory against Karlbergs BK, the club he would subsequently join.

=== Karlbergs BK ===
On 12 January 2024, Karlbergs BK announced the signing of Khan ahead of the club's first season in Ettan.

Khan's 2024 season was interrupted after he suffered a punctured lung, which caused him to miss several matches. He returned later in the season and provided an assist shortly after coming on as a substitute against Umeå FC.

He remained with Karlbergs during the 2025 season before leaving the club at the end of the year.

=== Vasalund IF ===
Khan joined Vasalund IF on a free transfer in January 2026. He became a regular member of the club's attack during the 2026 Ettan Norra season.

== International career ==
Born in Sweden, Khan is eligible to represent Pakistan. His involvement with the national team was initially delayed while he obtained his Pakistani passport, which he received in 2026 after more than a year of administrative delays.

On 19 May 2026, Khan received his first call-up to the Pakistan national football team. Later that month, Pakistan head coach Nolberto Solano included him in a 23-man squad for the 2026 Diamond Jubilee International Football Tournament in the Maldives. Khan featured during the tournament as Pakistan faced Bangladesh Olympic, the Maldives and Afghanistan, where he made his debut in the only match against the Bangladesh Olympic side.

In September 2026, Khan was selected in Pakistan's 23-man squad for the 2026 FIFA ASEAN Cup. He made his official international debut against Thailand on 26 September, appearing in Pakistan's 4–0 defeat. He scored his first goal in the same tournament in the eventual 2–2 draw against Philippines.

== Career statistics ==
=== International ===
As of match played 2 October 2026

Appearances and goals by national team and year
National team	Year	Apps	Goals
Pakistan	2026	3	1
Total		3	1

Scores and results list Pakistan's goal tally first, score column indicates score after each Khan goal.

List of international goals scored by Ali Khan
No.	Date	Venue	Opponent	Score	Result	Competition
1	29 September 2026	Si Jalak Harupat Stadium, Bandung, Indonesia	Philippines	1–2	2–2	2026 FIFA ASEAN Cup

== Honours ==
Pakistan

- Diamond Jubilee International Football Tournament: 2026

== See also ==
- List of Pakistan international footballers born outside Pakistan
