= Adil Nabi =

Pakistani footballer

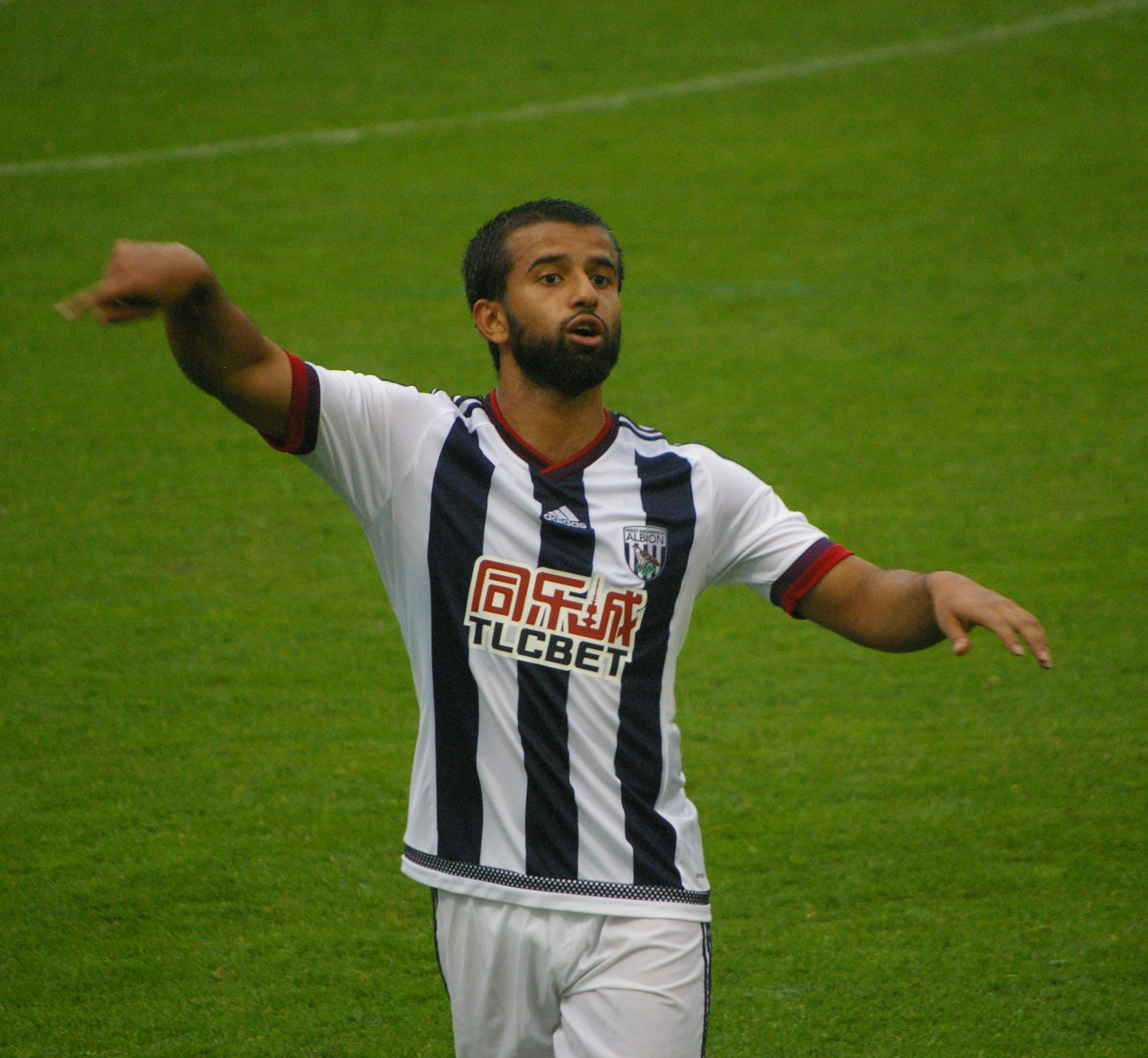
- Nabi playing for West Bromwich Albion in 2015

Personal information
- Full name: Adil Nabi
- Date of birth: 28 February 1994 (age 32)
- Place of birth: Birmingham, England
- Height: 1.72 m (5 ft 8 in)
- Positions: Attacking midfielder; forward

Team information
- Current team: Panachaiki

Youth career
- 2002–2013: West Bromwich Albion

Senior career*
Years	Team	Apps	(Gls)
2013–2016	West Bromwich Albion	0	(0)
2015	→ Delhi Dynamos (loan)	9	(3)
2016–2018	Peterborough United	8	(0)
2018	→ Nuneaton Town (loan)	5	(0)
2018–2019	Dundee	13	(1)
2019–2022	OFI	48	(8)
2022–2023	Atromitos	9	(0)
2023	Athens Kallithea	13	(2)
2023–2024	Doxa Katokopias	37	(7)
2025–2026	Harborough Town	9	(0)
2026–	Panachaiki	0	(0)

International career^{‡}
2009	England U16	2	(0)
2010–2011	England U17	9	(3)
2026–	Pakistan	3	(0)
- * Club domestic league appearances and goals as of 6 May 2026 ‡ National team caps and goals as of 13:57, 10 June 2026 (UTC)

Adil Nabi (born 28 February 1994) is a professional footballer who plays as an attacking midfielder for Gamma Ethniki club Panachaiki. Born in England, he plays for the Pakistan national team.

He was an academy product at West Bromwich Albion, but never made a first-team appearance. Nabi was the first player to be loaned from the Premier League to the Indian Super League, playing in the 2015 season for the Delhi Dynamos. In January 2016, he joined Peterborough United, where he played 10 total games in two years before a loan to Nuneaton Town. Nabi then had a short spell with Scottish club Dundee before playing in Greece for OFI, Atromitos and Athens Kallithea, and Cypriot club Doxa Katokopias.

== Club career ==
=== West Bromwich Albion ===
Born in Aston, Birmingham, Nabi joined the academy of West Bromwich Albion as an eight-year-old. After rising through the academy ranks, he signed his first professional contract with the club in 2011. He was named in a matchday squad for the first time on 12 January 2013 in an away Premier League match at Reading, remaining unused as West Brom lost 3–2. After the 2014–15 season, Nabi was named Albion's Young Player of the Season. For the under-21 team, he recorded 26 goals and 12 assists in 73 games.

==== Loan to Delhi Dynamos ====
On 28 August 2015 it was announced that Nabi would be loaned to the Delhi Dynamos of the Indian Super League for the 2015 season. West Brom board member Adrian Wright stated that the move was for the benefit of all parties, rather than speculation that it was to increase the club's commercial interests in India. Nabi was the first player to be loaned from a Premier League club to an ISL team. His teammates included UEFA Champions League winners Roberto Carlos, John Arne Riise and Florent Malouda, the first of whom was player-manager.

On 4 October, he made his professional debut for the Dynamos in their opening match of the season against Goa at the Fatorda Stadium, coming on as a 73rd-minute substitute for Chicão as they fell 2–0. He played only 31 minutes of the first five matches of the season for the capital-based team, but said that he was experiencing a personal growth which would not have been possible had he been loaned to a lower-league English club. On 19 November, he scored his first professional goal, opening a 3–1 win over FC Pune City at the Jawaharlal Nehru Stadium.

He added a second on 3 December, as the team who had already qualified for the play-offs came from behind to achieve a 3–3 home draw against Kerala Blasters. In the last game of the regular season three days later, he scored again in a 2–3 loss to Goa, and finished the season with 3 goals from 11 games as they were eliminated by the same team in the semi-finals; he was sent off for dissent on 15 December in a 3–0 away loss in the second leg.

=== Peterborough United ===
On 21 January 2016, Nabi joined Peterborough United for an undisclosed fee, signing a contract lasting until 2019. Two days later, as a 57th-minute substitute for Erhun Oztumer, he made his debut in English football, in the Posh's 2–1 loss to Gillingham in League One. On 13 February, he made his first start for the team, in their 0–4 loss to Bradford City at London Road. Speaking in January 2017, Director of Football Barry Fry said that: "Nabi was all set to go to Port Vale, but they sacked their manager (Bruno Ribeiro) and the caretaker-boss (Michael Brown) there is not so keen".

On 3 February 2018, having gone 14 months without an appearance – with that being a dead rubber EFL Trophy game against Walsall – Nabi was loaned to National League North strugglers Nuneaton Town for the rest of the season. He played five games for them as a substitute, and did not score.

=== Dundee ===
Following his release from Peterborough, Nabi trained in the summer of 2018 at Dundee, and on 2 August he signed a six-month contract. He made his debut for the Scottish Premiership club nine days later, as a half-time substitute for Lewis Spence at home to Aberdeen, and forced a save in the 1–0 loss. He made ten appearances for the Dee, scoring once to open a 2–1 home loss to Kilmarnock on 6 October. Nabi was released by Dundee in December 2018, at the end of his contract.

=== Greece ===
In January 2019, Nabi announced on Twitter that he had signed for OFI. He described the move as "crazy". In his debut against Panetolikos on 20 January, he scored two free kicks in a 3–0 home win. He was named Super League Greece's player of the week, and satellite channel Nova Sport named his goal as the best in Europe that week. Nabi scored a free kick very late into the second leg of the relegation play-offs against Cretan rivals Platanias that ensured a win and a place in the 2019–20 Super League.

On 26 January 2022, Nabi signed for Atromitos also in Greece's top flight, on a deal until 2024. A year and a day later, he signed for Super League Greece 2 club Athens Kallithea.

=== Doxa Katokopias ===
On 9 July 2023, Sky Sports had announced that Nabi had arrived in Cyprus to sign for Doxa Katokopias. Five days later, he was signed on a deal until the end of the season, and assigned the squad number 10. The move was the fifth country in the career, after previous spells playing in England, Scotland, Greece and India.

After a season out of professional football, Nabi appeared to return with another Cypriot team in July 2025, signing with newly-promoted First Division side Akritas Chlorakas before leaving the club due to not being registered in time.

=== Harborough Town ===
After two years as free agent, Adil signed for Southern Football League side Harborough Town on 3 March 2026.

=== Panachaiki ===
On 25 July 2026, Nabi was signed by Panachaiki, returning for third time to Greece, having previously played for OFI and Atromitos.

== International career ==
Nabi played for England under-16 and under-17 national team during his teens, scoring 3 goals in his 9 games for the older age group.

Adil is eligible to play for Pakistan, his younger brothers, Rahis and Samir had already played for the Pakistan national football team. In June 2023, Adil confirmed his intention to play for Pakistan in the FIFA World Cup qualifiers. However in March 2024, after receiving the documentation, Nabi along with Etzaz Hussain reportedly declined to play under the then management staff of the Pakistan Football Federation for the 2026 FIFA World Cup qualification against Jordan.

In June 2026, Nabi made his senior international debut with Pakistan at the 2026 Diamond Jubilee International Football Tournament.

== Style of play ==
West Bromwich Albion academy manager Mark Harrison stated in November 2015 that Nabi was equally as gifted in technical and finishing abilities as the team's first-choice striker Saido Berahino, who had partnered Nabi at youth level.

== Personal life ==
Nabi is of Pakistani descent. His younger brothers Samir and Rahis are also professional footballers, having progressed through West Brom's academy. He is a practising Muslim.

== Career statistics ==
As of end of 2025–26 season

Appearances and goals by club, season and competition
Club	Season	League			National Cup		League Cup		Other		Total	
Club	Season	Division	Apps	Goals	Apps	Goals	Apps	Goals	Apps	Goals	Apps	Goals
West Bromwich Albion	2015–16	Premier League	0	0	0	0	0	0	–		0	0
Delhi Dynamos (loan)	2015	Indian Super League	9	3	0	0	–		2 (Note: Appearances in Indian Super League finals)	0	11	3
Peterborough United	2015–16	League One	6	0	0	0	0	0	0	0	6	0
Peterborough United	2016–17	League One	2	0	0	0	0	0	2 (Note: Appearances in EFL Trophy)	0	4	0
Peterborough United	2017–18	League One	0	0	0	0	0	0	0	0	0	0
Peterborough United	Total		17	3	0	0	0	0	4	0	21	3
Nuneaton Town (loan)	2017–18	National League North	5	0	0	0	0	0	0	0	5	0
Dundee	2018–19	Scottish Premiership	13	1	0	0	1	0	–		14	1
OFI	2018–19	Super League Greece	9	3	0	0	–		2 (Note: Appearances in Super League Greece relegation play-offs)	1	11	4
OFI	2019–20	Super League Greece	25	4	0	0	–		–		25	4
OFI	2020–21	Super League Greece	5	0	0	0	–		1 (Note: Appearance in UEFA Europa League)	0	6	0
OFI	2021–22	Super League Greece	9	1	2	0	–		–		11	1
OFI	Total		66	9	2	0	1	0	3	1	72	10
Atromitos	2021–22	Super League Greece	9	0	0	0	–		–		9	0
Atromitos	2022–23	Super League Greece	0	0	0	0	0	0	0	0	0	0
Athens Kallithea	2022–23	Super League Greece 2	13	2	0	0	0	0	0	0	13	2
Doxa Katokopias	2023–24	Cypriot First Division	37	6	0	0	0	0	0	0	37	6
Harborough Town	2025–26	Southern League Premier Division Central	9	0	—		—		0	0	9	0
Career total			152	20	2	0	1	0	7	1	161	21

=== International ===
As of 10 June 2026

Appearances and goals by national team and year
National team	Year	Apps	Goals
Pakistan	2026	3	0
Total		3	0

== Honours ==
Pakistan

- Diamond Jubilee International Football Tournament: 2026
