= Samir Nabi =

English footballer (born 1996)

Personal information
- Date of birth: 16 December 1996 (age 29)
- Place of birth: Birmingham, England
- Height: 1.88 m (6 ft 2 in)
- Position: Midfielder

Youth career
- 2005–2016: West Bromwich Albion

Senior career*
Years	Team	Apps	(Gls)
2016	Delhi Dynamos	0	(0)
2017–2018	Carlisle United	3	(0)
2018–2019	Torquay United	11	(0)
2019	→ Halesowen Town (loan)	7	(0)
2020	Kidderminster Harriers	2	(0)
2020–2021	Hereford	4	(0)
2020–2021	→ Worcester City (dual-registration)		
2022–2023	Hednesford Town	1	(0)
2022	→ Sutton Coldfield Town (dual-registration)	0	(0)

International career^{‡}
2019	Pakistan	2	(0)
- * Club domestic league appearances and goals as of 20:30, 18 November 2020 ‡ National team caps and goals as of 11 June 2019

Samir Nabi (born 16 December 1996) is a footballer who plays as a midfielder. Born in England, he represented Pakistan internationally. He is currently a free agent.

Formed at West Bromwich Albion, he left in 2016 for Delhi Dynamos of the Indian Super League but did not make any appearances for either. He played three games for Carlisle United (one in EFL League Two) and then spent subsequent years in the English non-league. He earned two senior caps for Pakistan in June 2019.

== Club career ==
=== West Bromwich Albion and Delhi Dynamos ===
An attacking central midfielder, Nabi was the top scorer for West Bromwich Albion's under-21 side in the 2015–16 season, scoring 6 goals in 18 appearances. In September 2016 he joined Indian Super League club Delhi Dynamos after an 11-year stint at various junior sides of the Hawthorns; his elder brother Adil made the same move a year earlier. He learned from teammate and former France international Florent Malouda during his time in the Indian capital.

=== Carlisle United ===
Having played no part in Delhi's season, Nabi returned to England on 24 March 2017, signing with Carlisle United for the rest of the EFL League Two season. His move was delayed due to international clearance requirements. He made his professional debut in his only league appearance for the Cumbrians, a 15th-minute substitute appearance in place of John O'Sullivan on 1 April in a 2–0 win at Yeovil Town. Manager Keith Curle rewarded him with a new one-year contract, while saying that despite Nabi's technical ability he had to improve his game when Carlisle were without the ball. The following season, after only two EFL Trophy appearances to add to his account, he was one of eight players released by Carlisle, who missed out on the play-offs.

=== Torquay United ===
On 30 June 2018, he signed for National League South side Torquay United. He made his debut for the Gulls on 7 August as a half-time substitute for Chris Regis in a 1–0 home win over Bath City. On 30 October, as a late substitute, he was sent off for handball in a 2–2 draw at Weston-Super-Mare.

==== Loan to Halesowen Town ====
Having struggled for playing time, on 22 February 2019 he was loaned to Halesowen Town of the Southern Football League for the rest of the season and appeared in 7 league matches.

=== Kidderminister ===
On 16 January 2020 Nabi joined Kidderminster Harriers in the National League North on a deal until the end of the National League North season. He knew their interim manager Jimmy Shan from the West Brom academy.

=== Hereford and Worcester City ===
He joined Hereford of the same league on 3 October 2020 on a non-contract basis, then Worcester City of the Midland Football League Premier Division on a dual-registration basis on 3 December, before being released by Hereford on 2 June 2021.

=== Hednesford Town ===
Nabi joined Hednesford Town in the Southern Football League Premier Division Central on 30 September 2022. He made his debut, as a second-half substitute, the following day as his new side beat AFC Rushden & Diamonds 5–0. He was released from the club in January 2023.

==== Loan to Sutton Coldfield ====
On 17 October 2022, he signed for Sutton Coldfield Town on a dual-registration loan deal in order to gain match fitness in the Northern Premier League Division One Midlands.

== International career ==
In May 2019, Nabi and younger brother Rahis were called up for Pakistan's 2022 FIFA World Cup qualifiers against Cambodia the following month. He made his debut on 6 June in the first leg, as a starter in a 2–0 loss. Five days later, he played the last two minutes as a substitute in a 2–1 loss in the second leg in Doha, Qatar.

== Personal life ==
Samir Nabi is the middle child of three British Pakistani brothers who came through the West Bromwich Albion academy, with elder brother Adil and younger brother Rahis.

== Career statistics ==
As of match played 20 October 2017

Appearances and goals by club, season and competition
Club	Season	League			FA Cup		League Cup		Other		Total	
Club	Season	Division	Apps	Goals	Apps	Goals	Apps	Goals	Apps	Goals	Apps	Goals
Carlisle United	2016–17	League Two	1	0	0	0	0	0	0	0	1	0
Carlisle United	2017–18	League Two	0	0	0	0	0	0	2 (Note: Appearance in the Football League Trophy)	0	2	0
Career total			1	0	0	0	0	0	2	0	3	0

== Honours ==
Torquay United

- National League South: 2018–19

== See also ==
- British Asians in association football
- List of Pakistan international footballers born outside Pakistan
