= Mir Ali Asghar Akbarzada =

Afghan football manager

Personal information
- Place of birth: Afghanistan

Managerial career
- Years: Team
- 2002–2003: Afghanistan
- 2003: Afghanistan
- 2004–200x: Afghanistan U-20

Mir Ali Asghar Akbarzada, also Akbarzola (Persian: میر علی اصغر اکبرزاده), is an Afghan football manager.

== Career ==
From September 2002 until January 2003 he managed the Afghanistan national football team. In March and April 2003 he again coached the national team.

He was also the head coach of the youth national team.
