= Ali Haider Shah =

Pakistani footballer (born 2003)

Personal information
- Date of birth: 23 January 2003 (age 23)
- Position: Winger

Team information
- Current team: Ishøj IF
- Number: 24

Youth career
- Ishøj IF
- 2019–2020: Hvidovre IF
- 2020–2021: FC Roskilde U19

Senior career*
Years	Team	Apps	(Gls)
2021–2022	FC Roskilde	3	(1)
2022–2024	Ishøj IF	6	(7)
2024–2025	Brønshøj Boldklub	7	(7)
2025–2026	HIK	6	(0)
2026–	Ishøj IF	6	(0)

International career^{‡}
2025–	Pakistan	2	(0)
- * Club domestic league appearances and goals as of 4 October 2026 ‡ National team caps and goals as of 10 June 2026

Ali Haider Shah (born 23 January 2003) is a professional footballer who currently plays for Danish 2nd Division club Ishøj. Born in Denmark, he plays for the Pakistan national football team.

== Club career ==
=== Earlier career ===
Shah started his youth career with Ishøj IF and later played at the youth team of Hividovre. He later played for Roskilde where he rose to the ranks as senior player.

=== Ishøj IF ===
Shah returned to Ishøj IF as senior player in 2022, after trials at SPAL and Getafe CF. He stated that he intended to play in the Danish 3rd Division for a maximum of two years.

=== Brønshøj Boldklub ===
Shah signed with Brønshøj Boldklub in 2024, scoring for the club in the league on multiple occasions.

=== Hellerup ===
In June 2025, he signed for Hellerup IK.

=== Return to Ishøj IF ===
In July 2026, Shah returned to Danish 2nd Division side Ishøj.

== International career ==
Shah was eligible to play for Pakistan in the AFC U-23 Asian Cup qualifiers in 2025, but was not selected due to injury.

Haider was selected for the Pakistan squad in the 2027 AFC Asian Cup qualifiers second round.

== Career statistics ==
As of 10 June 2026

Appearances and goals by national team and year
National team	Year	Apps	Goals
Pakistan	2025	1	0
Pakistan	2026	1	0
Total		2	0

== Honours ==
Pakistan

- Diamond Jubilee International Football Tournament: 2026

== See also ==
- List of Pakistan international footballers born outside Pakistan
