= Afghanistan national football team =

Men's association football team

Afghanistan
- Nickname(s): د خراسان زمریان, Da Khurāsān Zmaryan شیران خراسان, Šīran Khurāsān (The Lions of Khorasan)
- Association: Afghanistan Football Federation (AFF)
- Confederation: AFC (Asia)
- Sub-confederation: CAFA (Central Asia)
- Head coach: Vacant
- Captain: Sharif Muhammad
- Most caps: Haroon Amiri (71)
- Top scorer: Faysal Shayesteh (10)
- Home stadium: Ghazi Stadium
- FIFA code: AFG
First colours	Second colours

FIFA ranking
- Current: 168 ▲3 (7 October 2026)
- Highest: 122 (April 2014)
- Lowest: 204 (January 2003)

First international
- Afghanistan 0–0 Iran (Kabul, Afghanistan; 25 August 1941)

Biggest win
- Bhutan 1–8 Afghanistan (New Delhi, India; 7 December 2011)

Biggest defeat
- Turkmenistan 11–0 Afghanistan (Ashgabat, Turkmenistan; 19 November 2003)

CAFA Nations Cup
- Appearances: 2 (first in 2023)
- Best result: Group stage (2023)

SAFF Championship
- Appearances: 7 (first in 2003)
- Best result: Champions (2013)
Medal record
Men's football
SAFF Championship
Gold medal – first place	2013 Nepal	Team
Silver medal – second place	2011 India	Team
Silver medal – second place	2015 India	Team

The Afghanistan national football team (Note: Pashto: د افغانستان د فوټبال ملي لوبډله Dari: تیم ملی فوتبال افغانستان) represents Afghanistan in men's international football and is controlled by the Afghanistan Football Federation. The Afghanistan Football Federation was established in 1922 and joined FIFA in 1948. It was also one of the founding members of the Asian Football Confederation (AFC) in 1954.

Afghanistan claimed their first international football title and marked a historic moment for Afghan football when they became champions of the 2013 tournament of the SAFF Championship.

== History ==
=== Early history ===
Reports connect the Ariana Kabul club with the Afghanistan Independence football tournament hosted in Kabul in August 1941. The team played two matches, a 3–1 loss to India and a 0–0 draw with Iran. Later accounts state that Ariana's squad represented Afghanistan in the event, although the precise relationship between the club and the national selection is not fully documented.

Afghanistan played its first official international match under FIFA at the 1948 Summer Olympics, where it faced Luxembourg on 26 July and lost 6–0. The team had two unsuccessful campaigns in the 1951 and 1954 Asian Games, losing all games. In 1959, the team featured in the 1960 Summer Olympics qualification against India.

In early years, the Kabul XI team was drawn of players selected from the leading Kabul based clubs, and was often considered de facto Afghanistan national team. In August 1974, the Kabul XI toured China, playing friendly matches against local sides. The team recorded five defeats, 1–4 against China Youth, 0–2 against Beijing, 1–4 against Hubei, 1–3 against Henan, 0–1 defeat Sichuan, and won the last match of the tour by 4–3 against Shanghai Youth. In the 1970s, the team participated at the Afghanistan Republic Day Festival Cup, playing in the latter two editions as Kabul A, along with second string Kabul B. In late 1975, the team featured in the 1976 AFC Asian Cup qualification, playing against Saudi Arabia, Qatar and Iraq.

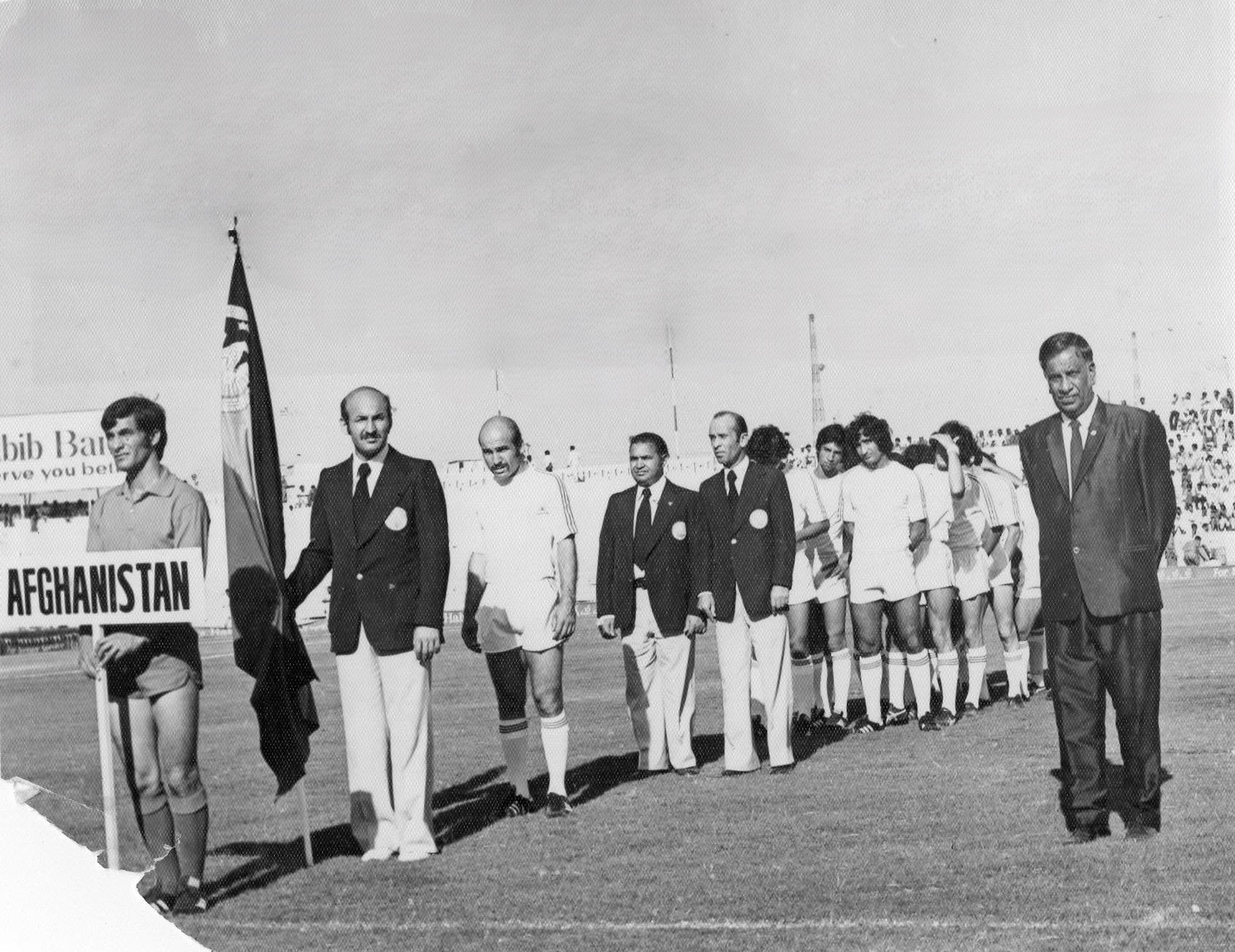
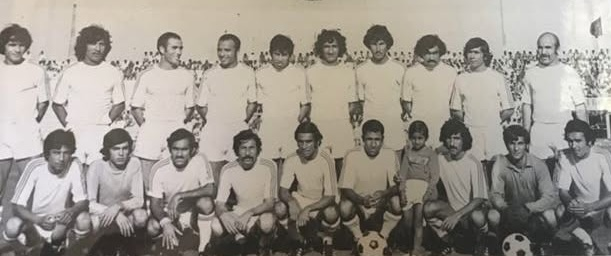
Afghanistan at the 1976 Quaid-e-Azam International Tournament

In October 1976, the team played at the 1976 Quaid-e-Azam International Tournament in Pakistan. In March 1979, the team played at the 1980 AFC Asian Cup qualification against Bangladesh and Qatar.

In February 1984, the team toured Kuwait for friendly matches. Before 2002, the last recorded international appearance for the team was in the 1984 AFC Asian Cup qualification, where they lost 6–1 to Jordan on 20 September. The team did not participate in international football between 1984 and 2002 due to political instability, including the Soviet invasion, civil war, and Taliban rule, which banned recreational activities such as football.

=== 2002–2009 ===
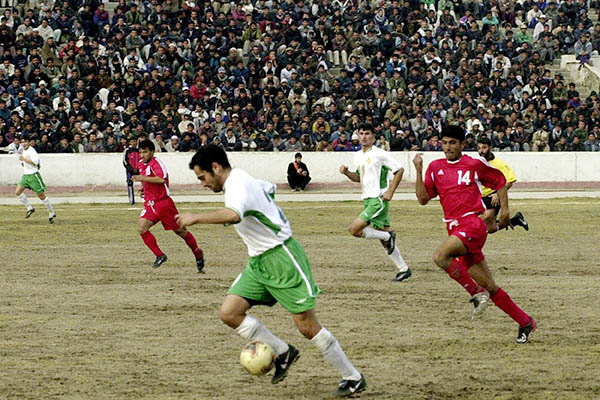
Match scene between Afghanistan and Turkmenistan in a FIFA World Cup qualification match in Kabul, 2003

Following the fall of the Taliban regime, Afghanistan re-entered the international football scene in 2002.

In 2003, the national team competed in the 2003 SAFF Gold Cup, but suffered defeats in all group stage matches against India, Pakistan, and Sri Lanka.

Later that year, Afghanistan took part in the 2004 AFC Asian Cup qualification, managing a win against Kyrgyzstan but falling short after a loss to Nepal, thus failing to advance. The team also entered the 2006 FIFA World Cup qualification for the first time, where they were eliminated by Turkmenistan with a 13–0 aggregate score.

In the 2005 SAFF Gold Cup held in Karachi, Pakistan, Afghanistan was defeated by the Maldives. During the inaugural 2006 AFC Challenge Cup, the team earned draws against both Chinese Taipei and the Philippines, with goals from Hafizullah Qadami and Sayed Maqsood Hashemi securing the results.

In the 2010 FIFA World Cup qualification, Afghanistan was knocked out by Syria. The team participated in the 2008 SAFF Championship, where they lost to Bhutan and drew with Sri Lanka and Bangladesh. However, they managed to top their qualification group for the 2008 AFC Challenge Cup but were eliminated in the final tournament after three consecutive defeats to India, Tajikistan, and Turkmenistan.

In the 2009 SAFF Championship, Afghanistan lost all three group matches—against Maldives, India, and Nepal—with their sole goal of the tournament scored by Hashmatullah Barakzai in a 3–1 loss to the Maldives.

=== 2010–2019 ===
Afghanistan entered their third World Cup qualification campaign and faced Palestine in the preliminary round. The first leg was played in Tajikistan due to security concerns and ended in defeat. The second leg in Palestine ended in a 1–1 draw, with Balal Arezou scoring for Afghanistan, resulting in their elimination.

==== 2011 SAFF Championship runners-up ====
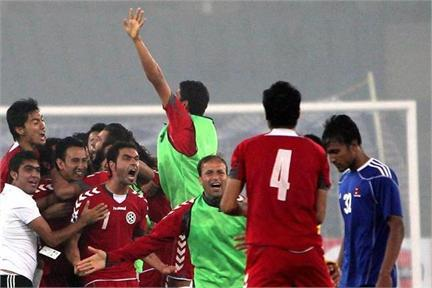
Players are celebrating after winning their 2011 SAFF Championship Semi-final against Nepal

In the 2011 SAFF Championship, Afghanistan achieved a dominant 8–1 victory over Bhutan, marking their second-biggest win in history. Balal Arezou scored four goals in that match. Afghanistan advanced to the semi-finals for the first time, defeating Nepal 1–0 after extra time, with Arezou scoring in the 101st minute. In the final, they lost 4–0 to India.

Afghanistan progressed from the first round of the 2012 AFC Challenge Cup qualification by defeating Bhutan over two legs. In the second round, they were eliminated after losses to Nepal and North Korea, despite a win over Sri Lanka.

==== 2013 SAFF Championship winners ====

2013 SAFF Championship Final starting lineup on 11 September 2013, in Dasarath Stadium (Kathmandu, Nepal).

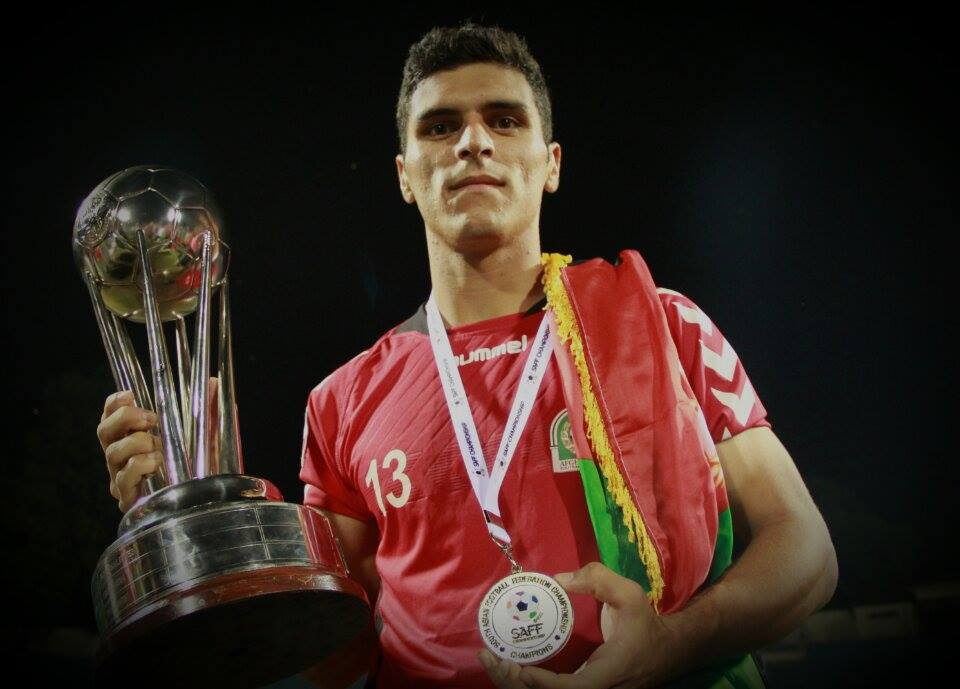
Hamidullah Karimi with the 2013 SAFF Championship trophy after their win against India

Afghanistan entered the 2013 SAFF Championship as the highest FIFA-ranked team in the tournament, standing at 139th globally. They opened the competition with a dominant 3–0 victory over Bhutan, with goals scored by Amiri—regarded as one of Afghanistan's greatest players—Azadzoy, and Barakzai.

In their second group stage match, they continued their strong form with a 3–1 win over Sri Lanka, thanks to goals from Rafi, Amiri, and Barakzai.

In the semi-finals, Afghanistan faced host nation Nepal and secured a hard-fought 1–0 win, with Sandjar Ahmadi scoring the only goal in the 11th minute.

The final was a rematch of the 2011 edition against India. This time, Afghanistan prevailed with a 2–0 victory, claiming their first-ever international football title and marking a historic moment for Afghan football.

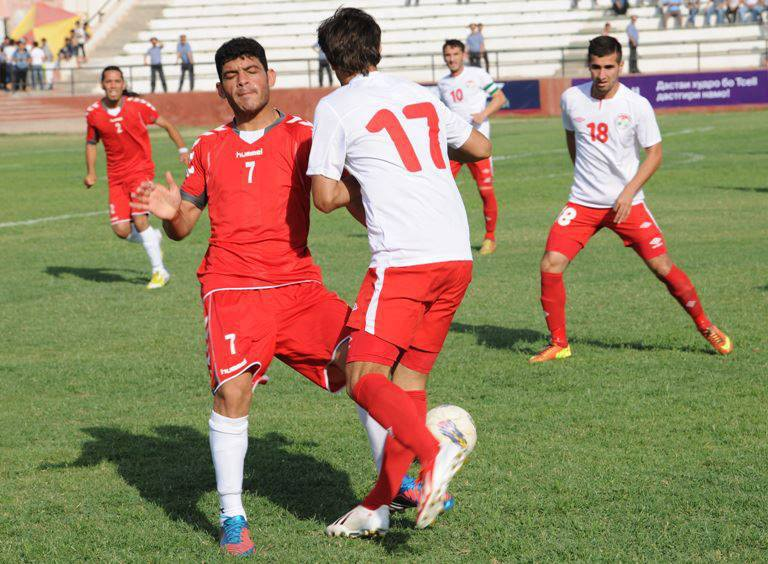
Afghanistan against Tajikistan on 4 May 2014

Afghanistan reached the semi-finals of the 2014 AFC Challenge Cup but lost 2–0 to eventual champions Palestine. In the third-place match, they drew 1–1 with the Maldives and lost 8–7 in a penalty shootout. On 10 June 2014, the Afghanistan Football Federation moved from the South Asian Football Federation (SAFF) to the Central Asian Football Association (CAFA). Later that year, the federation received the FIFA Fair Play Award at the 2014 Ballon d'Or Gala for its efforts to promote football under difficult circumstances.

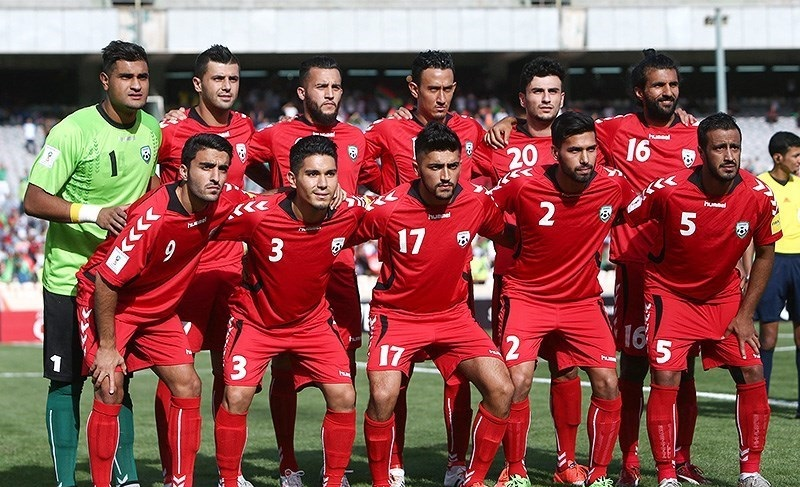
Afghan national team before the 2018 FIFA World Cup qualification match against Japan, Azadi Stadium

On 9 February 2015, Slaven Skeledžić was appointed as head coach. The team started the qualifiers with a 6–0 loss to Syria but earned its first-ever World Cup qualification victory against Cambodia. After a poor run of results, Skeledžić resigned in October 2015. Peter Segrt took over in November and led the team to another win over Cambodia, 3–0. On 27 April 2015 the AFF signed a contract with a new sponsor called Alokozay Group of Companies.

==== 2015 SAFF Championship runners-up ====
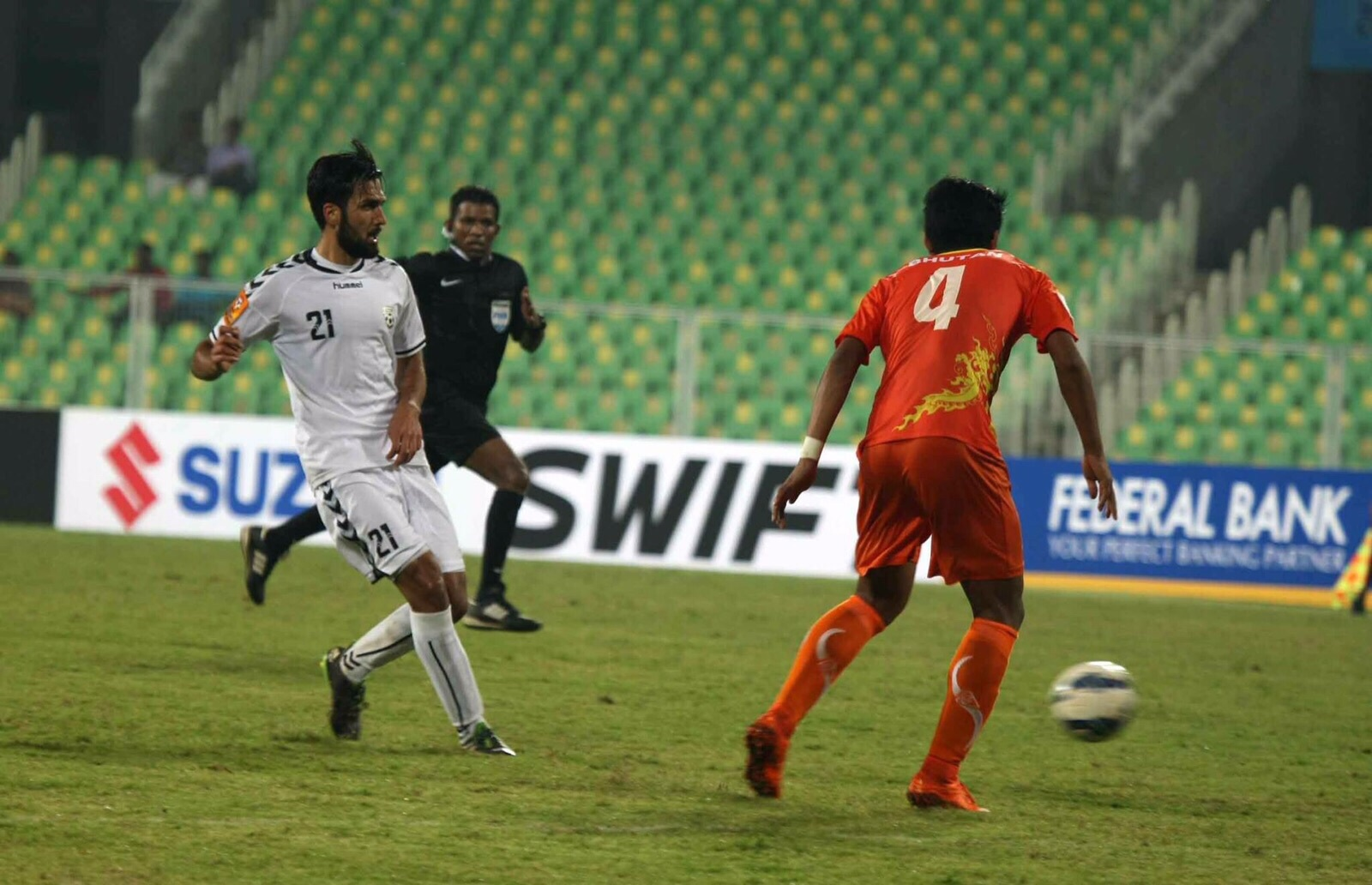
Afghanistan against Bhutan at the 2015 SAFF Championship

This tournament marked Afghanistan's final appearance in the SAFF Championship before moving to CAFA. The team won all its group stage matches—beating Bangladesh 4–0, Bhutan 3–0, and Maldives 4–1. In the semi-final, they defeated Sri Lanka 5–0. The final was a rematch with India, which Afghanistan lost 2–1 after extra time.

Following the SAFF Championship, Afghanistan had a chance to qualify for the 2019 AFC Asian Cup through expanded qualifiers. After a second heavy loss to Japan (5–0), they needed a win over Singapore, which they secured 2–1. The team then played friendlies against Lebanon (lost 2–0) and Malaysia (1–1 draw). In February 2017, Otto Pfister was appointed as head coach. Afghanistan drew 1–1 with Vietnam in the qualifiers, but losses to Cambodia and Jordan ended their qualification hopes. In July 2018, the federation announced a friendly match against Palestine in Kabul—their first home game since 2013.

=== 2020–present ===
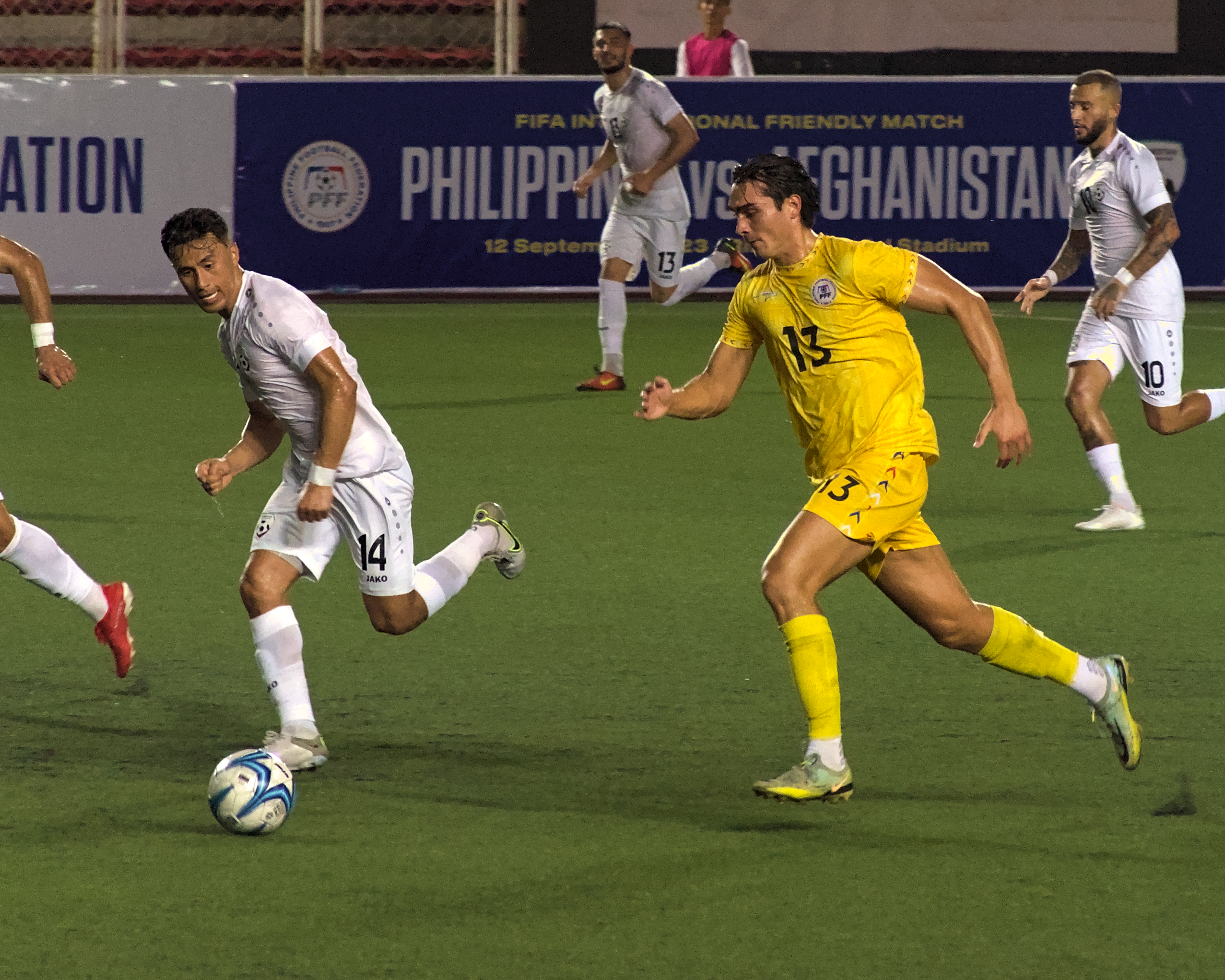
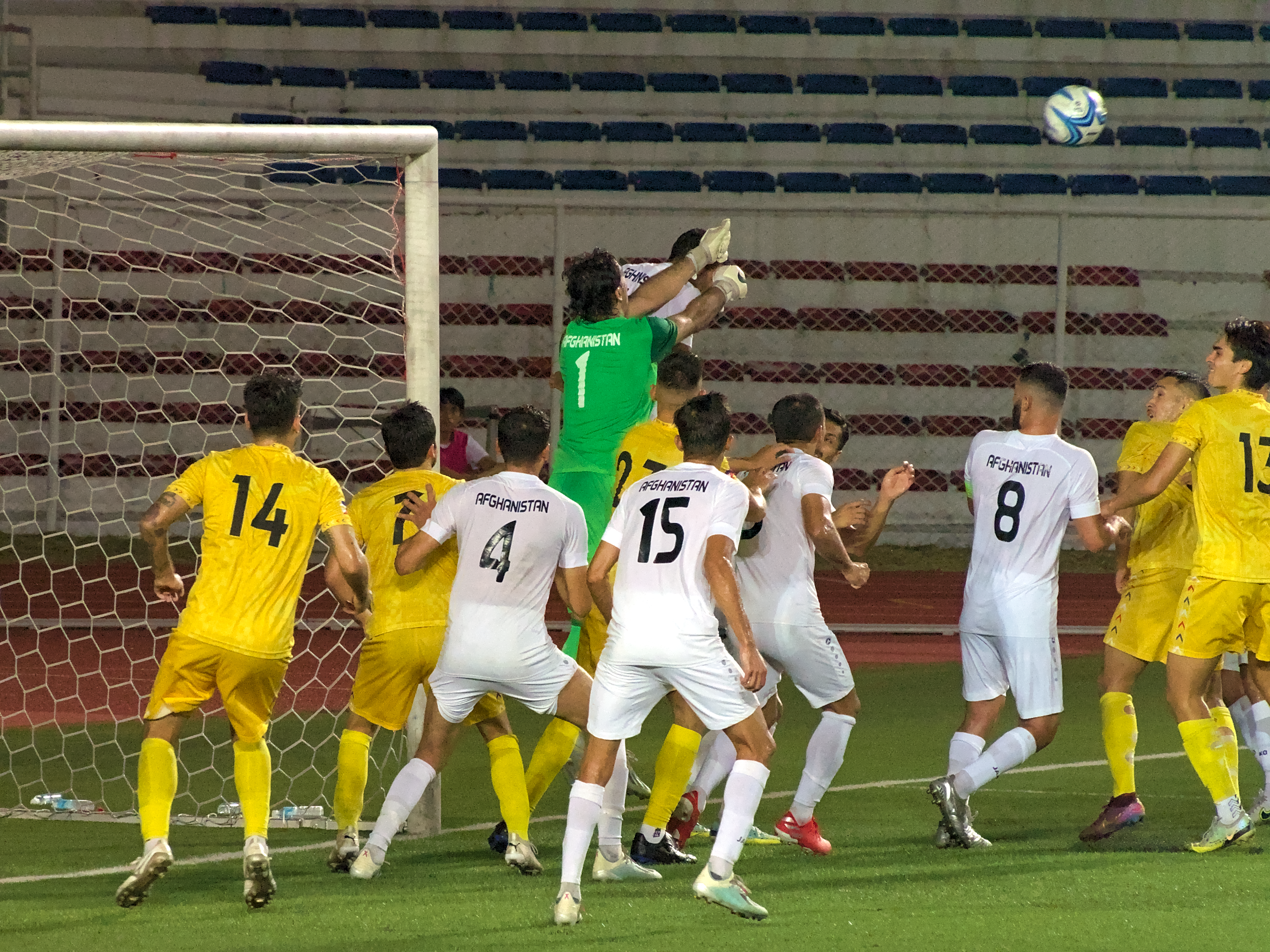
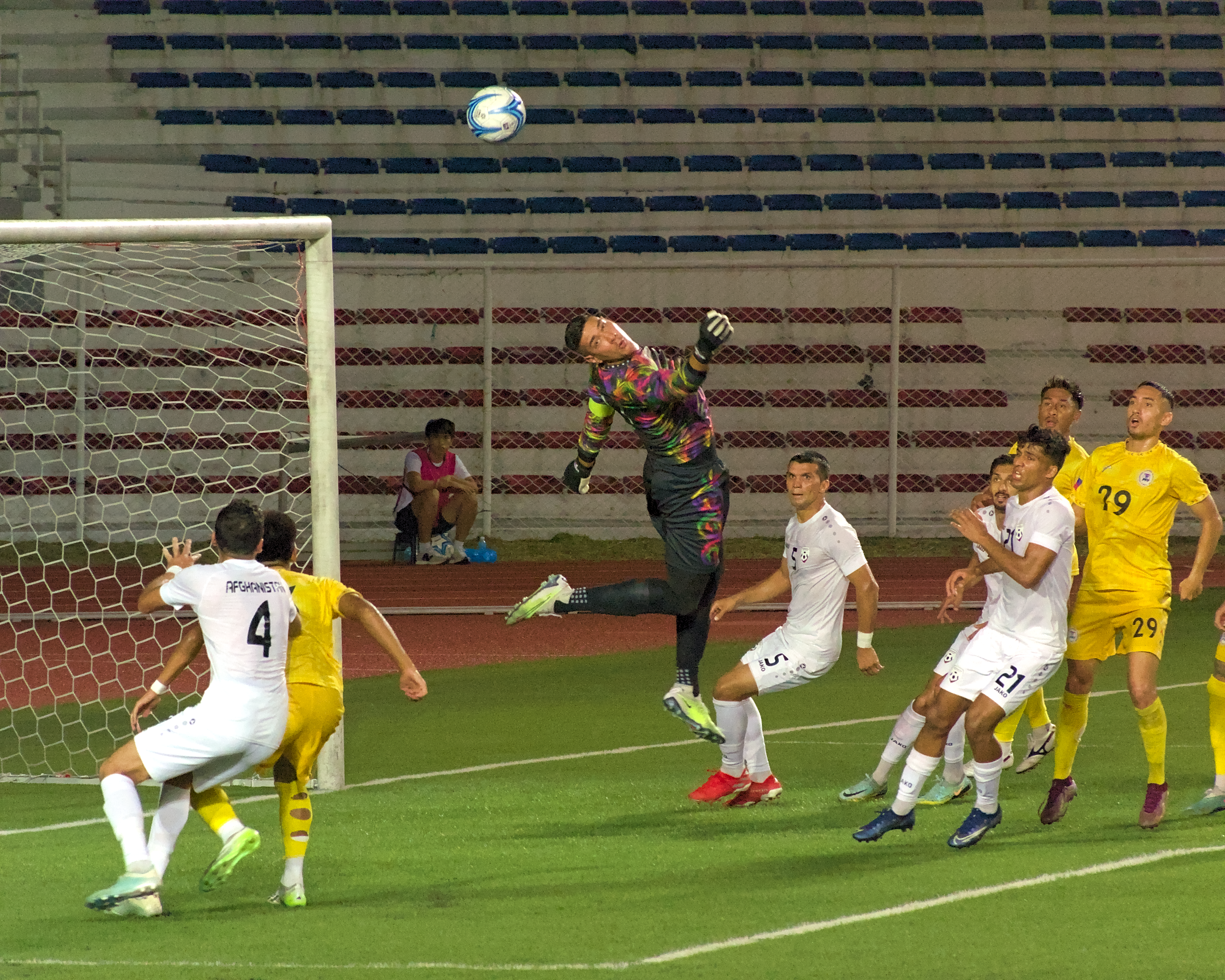
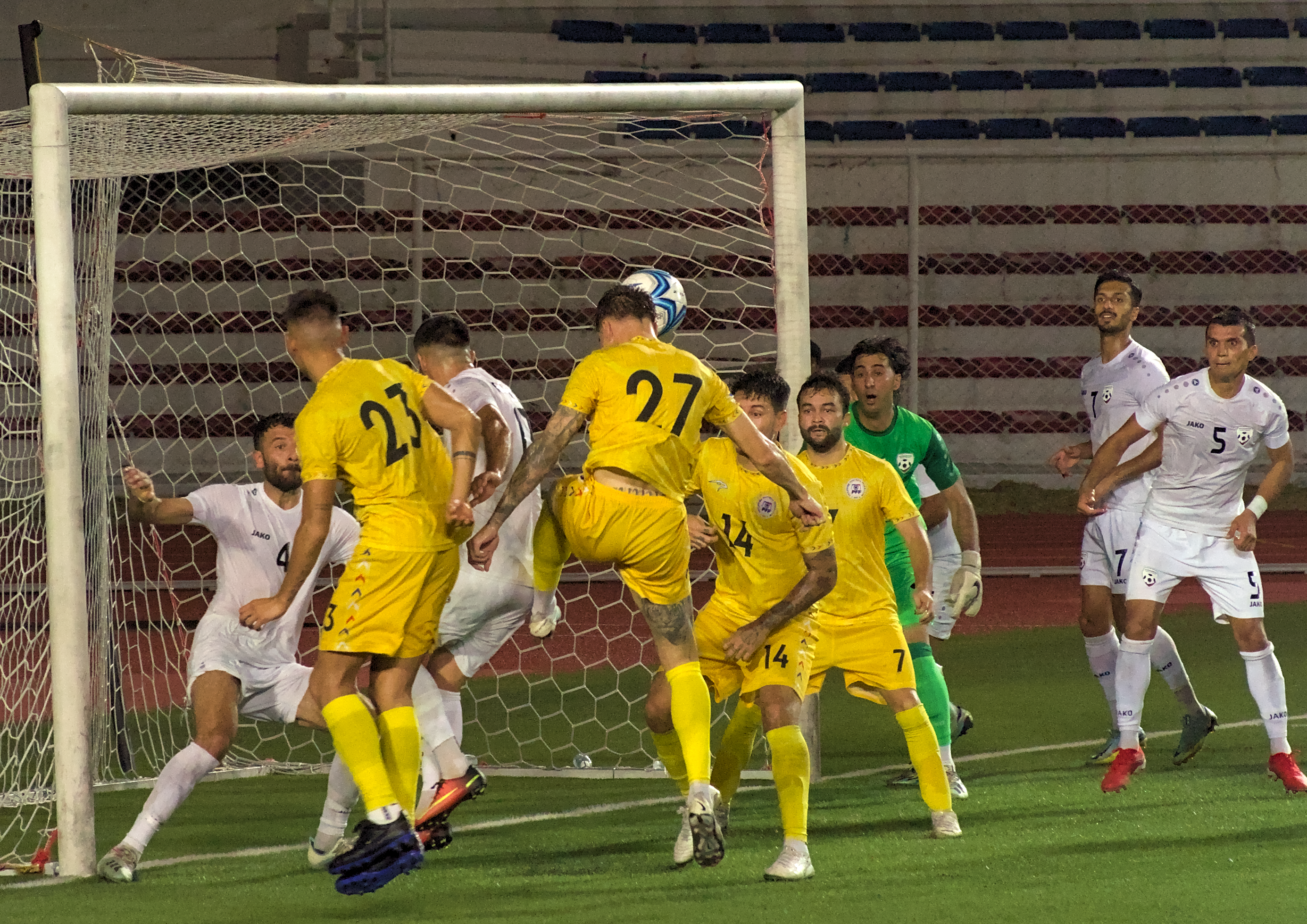
Afghanistan against Philippines on 12 September 2023

The 2023 CAFA Nations Cup was the first edition of the CAFA Nations Cup, the biennial international men's football championship of Central Asia organized by the Central Asian Football Association (CAFA). The event was held in Kyrgyzstan and Uzbekistan from 10 to 20 June. Afghanistan lost both games in Group B to Iran and Kyrgyzstan, thus finishing in last place in the tournament.

The 2025 CAFA Nations Cup was the second edition of the CAFA Nations Cup. The event was held in Tajikistan and Uzbekistan from 29 August to 8 September. Afghanistan was allocated in Group B and lost their first match against Iran. Their second match was against Tajikistan on 1 September, which ended in a 0–2 defeat. Afghanistan's third and final match in Group B was against India on 4 September, which ended in a 0–0 draw.

== Team image ==
=== Kit suppliers ===
Kit manufacturer	Period
(Germany) Adidas	2005–2008
(Denmark) Hummel	2009–2020
(Germany) Jako	2020–2023
(India) SIX5SIX	2024–present

=== Supporters ===
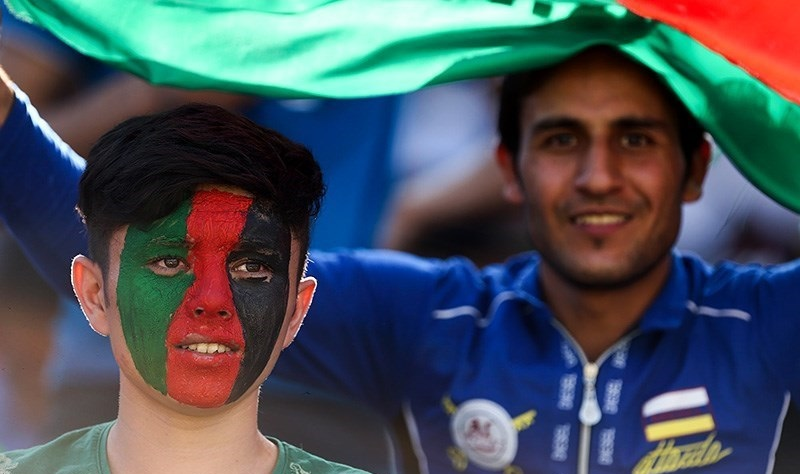
Afghan supporters watching their national team play against Japan during 2018 FIFA World Cup qualification in Azadi Stadium, Tehran.

Afghanistan's national football team has attracted significant public support during major fixtures. In August 2013, the team's friendly against Pakistan drew a sell-out crowd for the first international match held in Kabul in a decade, with reports describing the occasion as a rare display of national unity across the country's ethnic and political divisions. Later that year, Afghanistan's victory over India in the 2013 SAFF Championship final prompted widespread celebrations in Kabul and other parts of the country.

=== Rivalries ===
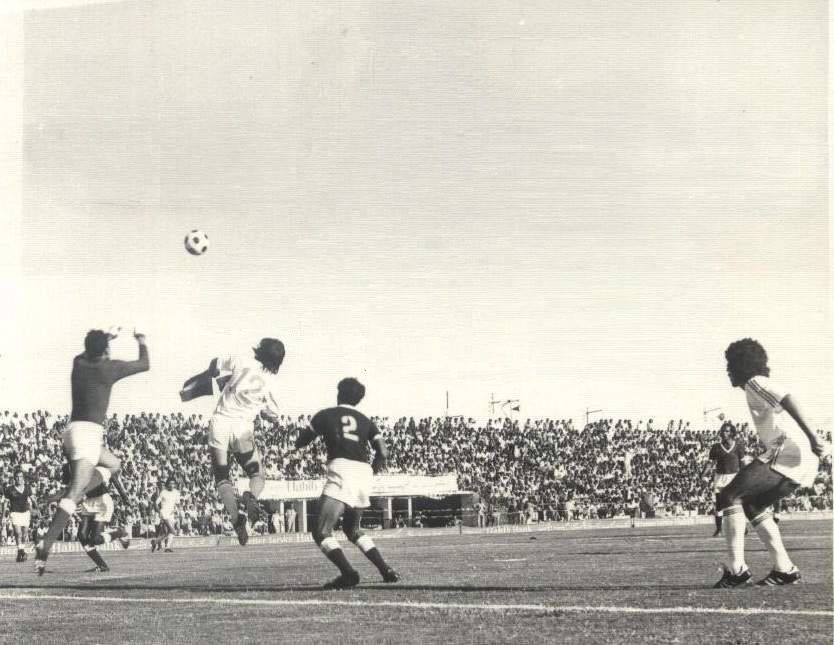
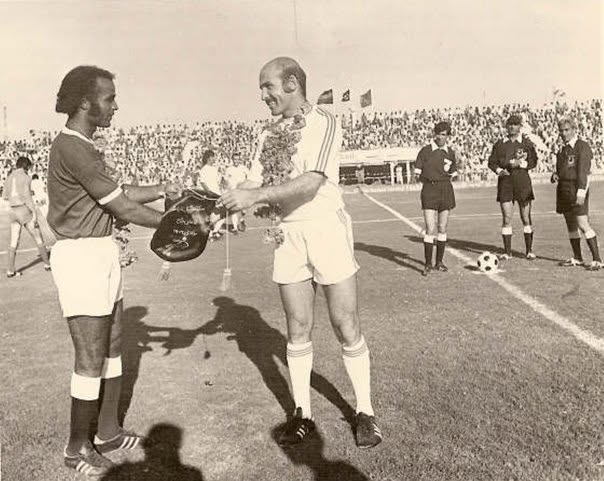
Pakistan vs Afghanistan at the 1976 Quaid-e-Azam International Tournament

Afghanistan shares a sporting rivalry with Pakistan, which extends into football alongside other sports.

The national teams of Pakistan and Afghanistan first met at the 1976 Afghanistan Republic Day Festival Cup, where the A team of Afghanistan won by 1–0, with Mohammad Saber Rohparwar scoring the lone goal on a corner kick minutes before game's end. Because of rising tensions between the two countries in the 1970s, Afghan president Mohammad Daoud Khan handed each player 5,000 afghanis as a celebration and gift for their victory. Both teams met again at the 1976 Quaid-e-Azam International Tournament the same year where Pakistan avenged by winning by the same score, with forward Afzal Qasim scoring the winning goal in the eighth minute after the kick off.

The ensuing civil war and political instability in Afghanistan prevented the two sides from meeting again until 2003. Due to the historical, cultural and political relationship between the two countries, contests between the teams generate much enthusiasm amongst football fans on account of their mutual relations and have been referred to as a "rivalry".

== Results and fixtures ==
The following is a list of match results in the last 12 months, as well as any future matches that have been scheduled.

Win Draw Loss Fixture

=== 2026 ===
26 March 2026 2027 AFC Asian Cup qualification	Afghanistan	1–2	Myanmar	Yangon, Myanmar
17:00 UTC+6:30	Popalzay 10'	Report; Report (AFC)	Than Paing 45'; Khun Kyaw Zin Hein 73'	Stadium: Thuwunna Stadium; Attendance: 1,760; Referee: Ngô Duy Lân (Vietnam)

31 March 2026 2027 Asian Cup qualification	Syria	5–1	Afghanistan	Jeddah, Saudi Arabia
19:15 UTC+3	Al Salkhadi 5'; Al Hallaq 54'; Al Mustafa 58', 82'; Al Aswad 90+1'	Report; Report (AFC)	Panahi 23'	Stadium: Prince Abdullah Al-Faisal Sports City Stadium; Attendance: 562; Referee: Nasrullo Kabirov (Tajikistan)

1 June 2026 Diamond Jubilee Football Tournament	Maldives	0–1	Afghanistan	Male, Maldives
21:00 MVT (20:30 AFT)		Report	Fazi 79'	Stadium: National Football Stadium; Attendance: 1,028; Referee: Aditya Purkayastha (India)

4 June 2026 Diamond Jubilee Football Tournament	Afghanistan	0–0	Bangladesh Olympic	Male, Maldives
21:00 MVT (20:30 AFT)		Report		Stadium: National Stadium; Referee: Senthilnathan Sekaran (India)

7 June 2026 Diamond Jubilee Football Tournament	Pakistan	2–0	Afghanistan	Malé, Maldives
16:00 UTC+5:30	Nawaz 5'; Hamid 90+2'	Report		Stadium: National Football Stadium; Attendance: 450; Referee: Hussain Sinan (Maldives)

10 June 2026 Final	Pakistan	2–0	Afghanistan	Malé, Maldives
21:00 UTC+5:30	Shayak 24'; Hamid 90+4'	Report		Stadium: National Football Stadium; Attendance: 273; Referee: Aditya Purkayastha (India)

== Coaching staff ==
=== Current coaching staff ===
Role	Name
Head coach	Vacant
Assistant coach	(Afghanistan) Shabir Isoufi
Goalkeeping coach	(Afghanistan) Hamidullah Yousufzai
Equipment manager	(Afghanistan) Mahdi Shirzad
Team manager	(Afghanistan) Samir Homauni
Media manager	(Afghanistan) Mustafa Hashimi

=== Managerial history ===
As of 30 August 2025
Caretaker managers are listed in italics.

Name	Period	P	W	D	L	Win %	Ref.
(Afghanistan) Sardar Mohammad Farooq Khan Seraj	1949						
Unknown	1950–1974						
(Soviet Union) Vladimir Salenko	1975–1976						
(Soviet Union) Sergei Salnikov	1976–1977						
(Soviet Union) Nikolai Yefimov	1977–1978						
(Afghanistan) Islam Gul	1978–1979						
(Afghanistan) Sayed Ahmad Zia Muzafari	1979–1981						
(Afghanistan) Khwaja Aziz	1981–1987						
(Soviet Union) Gennadi Sarychev	1987–1988						
None (Note: From 1988 to 2003, Afghanistan didn't play any matches due to security concerns within the country.)	1988–2003						
(Afghanistan) Mir Ali Asghar Akbarzada	2003–2004						
(Afghanistan) Mohammad Yousef Kargar	2004–2005						
(Germany) Klaus Stärk	2005–2008						
(Afghanistan) Mohammad Yousef Kargar	2008–2014						
(Germany) Erich Rutemöller	2014–2015						
(Iran) Hossein Saleh	2015						
(Bosnia and Herzegovina) Slaven Skeledžić	2015						
(Croatia) Petar Šegrt	2015–2016						
(Afghanistan) Anoush Dastgir	2016–2017						
(Germany) Otto Pfister	2017–2018						
(Afghanistan) Anoush Dastgir	2018–2023						
(Kuwait) Abdullah Al Mutairi	2023						
(England) Ashley Westwood	2023–2024						
(Uzbekistan) Usmon Toshev	2024–2025						
(Italy) Vincenzo Alberto Annese	2025						
(Brazil) José Antonio Nogueira	2026						

== Players ==
=== Current squad ===
The following players were named in the squad for the 2026 Diamond Jubilee International Football Tournament between 1–10 June 2026.

- Caps and goals are correct as of 10 June 2026, after the match against Pakistan.

No.	Pos.	Player	Date of birth (age)	Caps	Goals	Club
1	GK	Faisal Hamidi	29 January 1997 (age 29)	16	0	(Afghanistan Football Federation) Sorkh Poshan Herat
22	GK	Ali Sina Hakimi	Unknown	0	0	(Football Australia) Springvale White Eagles
23	GK	Keyvan Mottaghian	16 March 2003 (age 23)	3	0	(Philippine Football Federation) Valenzuela PB–Mendiola
2	DF	Nawid Mahbobi	18 February 2008 (age 18)	3	0	(Afghanistan Football Federation) Sorkh Poshan Herat
3	DF	Amid Arezou	5 June 1996 (age 30)	11	0	(All India Football Federation) Gokulam Kerala
4	DF	Mahboob Hanifi	22 March 1996 (age 30)	27	1	(Afghanistan Football Federation) Abu Muslim
5	DF	Ahmad Shekib Mehri	2 December 2006 (age 19)	5	0	(Afghanistan Football Federation) Sorkh Poshan Herat
6	DF	Habibulla Askar	9 August 1999 (age 27)	14	0	(Swedish Football Association) Oskarshamns
12	DF	Elias Mansor	17 November 2006 (age 20)	7	0	(The Football Association) Millwall
21	DF	Ali Rayez Muradi	Unknown	2	0	(Football Australia) West Adelaide
8	MF	Rahmat Akbari	20 June 2000 (age 26)	16	1	(Football Australia) Queensland Lions
13	MF	Hamed Mumand	14 July 2002 (age 24)	1	0	(Swedish Football Association) FOC Farsta
14	MF	Ali Reza Panahi	22 August 2000 (age 26)	8	1	(Afghanistan Football Federation) Abu Muslim
15	MF	Amin Nabizada	21 June 2007 (age 19)	3	0	(The Football Association) Watford
16	MF	Sahil Sarwari	22 February 2009 (age 17)	2	0	(Afghanistan Football Federation) Sorkh Poshan Herat
18	MF	Jamshed Asekzai	9 October 1997 (age 29)	12	1	(Swedish Football Association) IFK Trelleborg
19	MF	Omid Popalzay	25 January 1996 (age 30)	50	8	(Football Association of Indonesia) Persiraja Banda Aceh
20	MF	Mustafa Omarkheil	5 April 1999 (age 27)	4	0	(Norwegian Football Federation) Skjetten
7	FW	Mosawer Ahadi	8 March 2000 (age 26)	21	0	(Afghanistan Football Federation) Abu Muslim
9	FW	Roman Fazi	10 February 1999 (age 27)	3	1	(Norwegian Football Federation) Asker
10	FW	Omid Musawi	1 January 2001 (age 25)	25	1	(Football Association of Malaysia) Penang
11	FW	Maziar Kouhyar	30 September 1997 (age 29)	21	0	(The Football Association) Notts County
17	FW	Yaser Safi	12 September 2008 (age 18)	4	0	(Afghanistan Football Federation) Sorkh Poshan Herat

=== Recent call-ups ===
The following players have been called up for the team within the last 12 months and are still available for selection.

Pos.	Player	Date of birth (age)	Caps	Goals	Club	Latest call-up
Notes: ^{INJ} = Withdrew due to injury; ^{PRE} = Preliminary squad; ^{RET} = Retired from the national team; ^{SUS} = Serving suspension; ^{WD} = Withdrew due to non-injury related reasons

== Individual records ==
As of 10 June 2026
Players in bold are still active with Afghanistan.

=== Most appearances ===
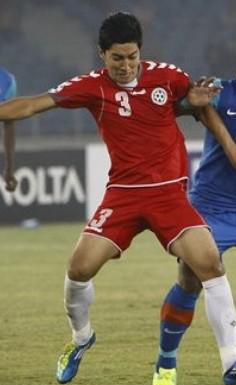
Zohib Islam Amiri is Afghanistan's most capped player with 71 appearances.

Rank	Name	Caps	Goals	Career
1	Zohib Islam Amiri	71	6	2005–2024
2	Faysal Shayesteh	59	10	2014–2023
3	**Ovays Azizi**	51	0	2015–present
4	**Omid Popalzay**	50	8	2015–present
5	Abassin Alikhil	41	0	2011–2022
6	Mustafa Hadid	39	2	2008–2021
7	Sharif Mukhammad	38	3	2015–2026
7	Djelaludin Sharityar	38	1	2007–2015
9	Mustafa Azadzoy	37	3	2013–2023
10	Ahmad Hatifi	34	4	2011–2016

=== Top goalscorers ===
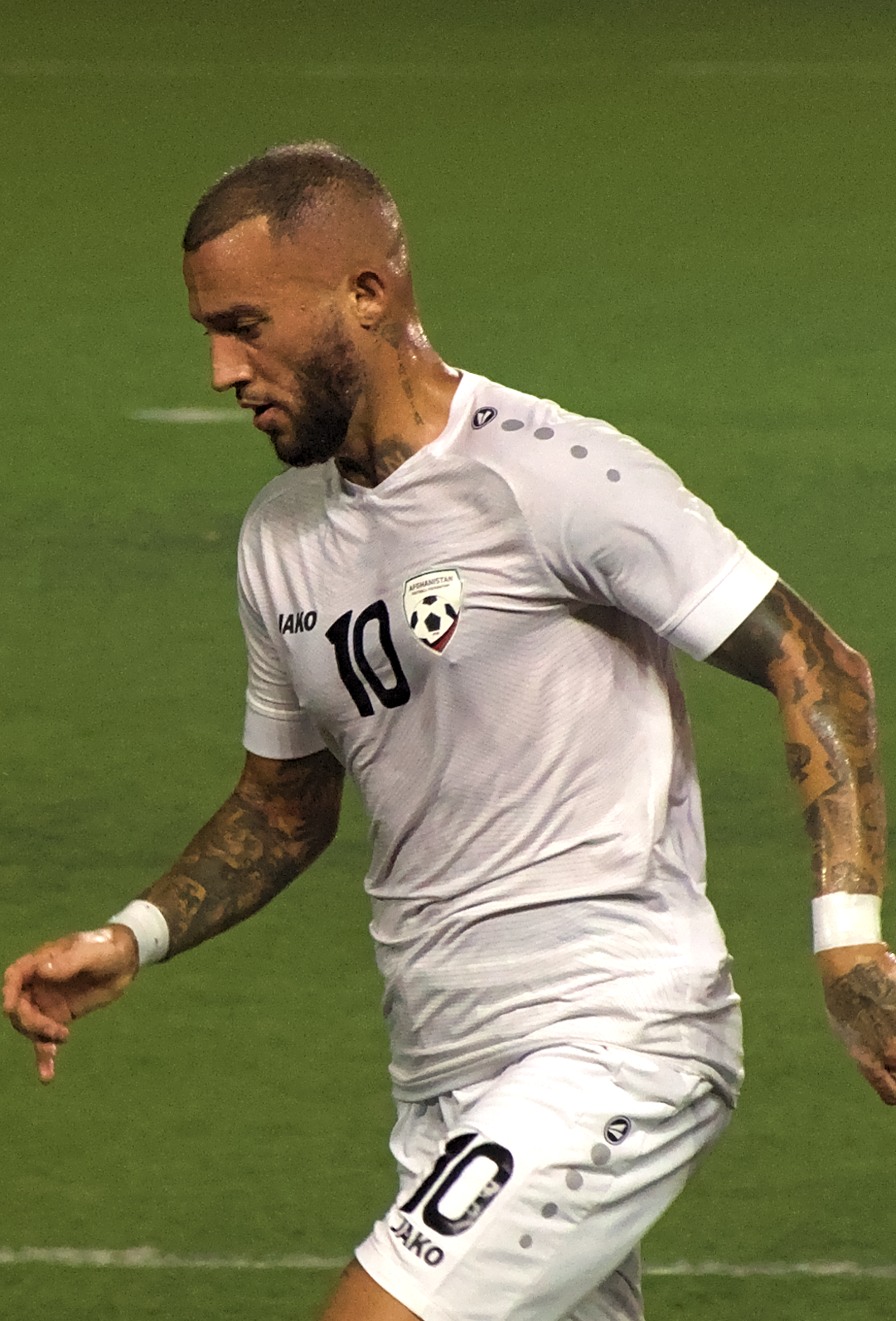
Faysal Shayesteh is Afghanistan's top scorer with 10 goals.

Rank	Name	Goals	Caps	Ratio	Career
1	Faysal Shayesteh	10	59	0.17	2014–2023
2	**Balal Arezou**	9	31	0.29	2011–present
3	**Omid Popalzay**	8	50	0.16	2015–present
4	Khaibar Amani	7	21	0.33	2015–2019
5	Zohib Islam Amiri	6	71	0.08	2005–2024
5	Sandjar Ahmadi	6	22	0.27	2011–2015
7	Hashmatullah Barakzai	5	28	0.18	2007–2014
7	Zubayr Amiri	5	33	0.15	2011–2022
9	**Jabar Sharza**	4	19	0.21	2017–present
9	Amredin Sharifi	4	29	0.14	2013–2023
9	Noraollah Amiri	4	31	0.13	2015–2021
9	Farshad Noor	4	33	0.12	2017–2023
9	Ahmad Hatifi	4	34	0.12	2011–2016

== Competitive record ==
=== FIFA World Cup ===
FIFA World Cup record										Qualification record					
Year	Round	Pos.	Pld	W	D	L	GF	GA	Squad	Pld	W	D	L	GF	GA
(Uruguay) 1930	Not a member of FIFA									Not a member of FIFA					
(Italy) 1934	Not a member of FIFA									Not a member of FIFA					
(France) 1938	Not a member of FIFA									Not a member of FIFA					
(Brazil) 1950	Did not enter									Did not enter					
(Switzerland) 1954	Did not enter									Did not enter					
(Sweden) 1958	Did not enter									Did not enter					
(Chile) 1962	Did not enter									Did not enter					
(England) 1966	Did not enter									Did not enter					
(Mexico) 1970	Did not enter									Did not enter					
(West Germany) 1974	Did not enter									Did not enter					
(Argentina) 1978	Did not enter									Did not enter					
(Spain) 1982	Did not enter									Did not enter					
(Mexico) 1986	Did not enter									Did not enter					
(Italy) 1990	Did not enter									Did not enter					
(United States) 1994	Did not enter									Did not enter					
(France) 1998	Did not enter									Did not enter					
(South Korea) (Japan) 2002	Did not enter									Did not enter					
(Germany) 2006	Did not qualify									2	0	0	2	0	13
(South Africa) 2010	Did not qualify									2	0	0	2	1	5
(Brazil) 2014	Did not qualify									2	0	1	1	1	3
(Russia) 2018	Did not qualify									8	3	0	5	8	24
(Qatar) 2022	Did not qualify									8	1	3	4	5	15
(Canada) (Mexico) (United States) 2026	Did not qualify									8	3	2	3	5	14
(Morocco) (Portugal) (Spain) 2030	To be determined									To be determined					
(Saudi Arabia) 2034	To be determined									To be determined					
Total	—	0/23	0	0	0	0	0	0	—	30	7	6	17	20	74

=== AFC Asian Cup ===
AFC Asian Cup record										Qualification record					
Year	Round	Pos.	Pld	W	D	L	GF	GA	Squad	Pld	W	D	L	GF	GA
(Hong Kong) 1956	Withdrew									Withdrew					
(South Korea) 1960	Did not enter									Did not enter					
1964	Withdrew									Withdrew					
(Iran) 1968	Did not enter									Did not enter					
(Thailand) 1972	Did not enter									Did not enter					
(Iran) 1976	Did not qualify									6	0	1	5	3	18
(Kuwait) 1980	Did not qualify									4	0	1	3	4	11
(Singapore) 1984	Did not qualify									4	0	1	3	1	20
(Qatar) 1988	Did not enter									Did not enter					
(Japan) 1992	Did not enter									Did not enter					
(United Arab Emirates) 1996	Did not enter									Did not enter					
(Lebanon) 2000	Did not enter									Did not enter					
(China) 2004	Did not qualify									2	1	0	1	2	5
(Indonesia) (Malaysia) (Thailand) (Vietnam) 2007	Did not enter									Did not enter					
(Qatar) 2011	Did not enter									Did not enter					
(Australia) 2015	Did not qualify									AFC Challenge Cup					
(United Arab Emirates) 2019	Did not qualify									14	4	3	7	15	34
(Qatar) 2023	Did not qualify									11	1	4	6	9	21
(Saudi Arabia) 2027	Did not qualify									12	3	4	5	7	18
Total	—	0/18	0	0	0	0	0	0	—	53	9	14	30	41	127

=== Summer Olympics ===
Summer Olympics record
Year	Round	Pos.	Pld	W	D	L	GF	GA	Squad
(United Kingdom) 1908	Did not enter								
(Sweden) 1912	Did not enter								
(Belgium) 1920	Did not enter								
(France) 1924	Did not enter								
(Netherlands) 1928	Did not enter								
(Germany) 1936	Did not enter								
(United Kingdom) 1948	Preliminary round	18th	1	0	0	1	0	6	Squad
(Finland) 1952	Did not enter								
(Australia) 1956	Withdrew								
(Italy) 1960	Withdrew								
(Japan) 1964	Did not enter								
(Mexico) 1968	Did not enter								
(Germany) 1972	Did not enter								
(Canada) 1976	Did not enter								
(Soviet Union) 1980	Did not enter								
(United States) 1984	Did not enter								
(South Korea) 1988	Did not enter								
1992 to present	See Afghanistan national under-23 football team								
Total	Preliminary round	1/17	0	0	0	0	0	0	—

=== Asian Games ===
Asian Games record
Year	Round	Pos.	Pld	W	D	L	GF	GA	Squad
(India) 1951	Fourth place	4th	2	0	0	2	0	5	Squad
(Philippines) 1954	Group stage	12th	2	0	0	2	4	12	Squad
(Japan) 1958	Did not enter								
(Indonesia) 1962	Did not enter								
(Thailand) 1966	Did not enter								
(Thailand) 1970	Did not enter								
(Iran) 1974	Did not enter								
(Thailand) 1978	Did not enter								
(India) 1982	Did not enter								
(South Korea) 1986	Did not enter								
(China) 1990	Did not enter								
(Japan) 1994	Did not enter								
(Thailand) 1998	Did not enter								
2002 to present	See Afghanistan national under-23 football team								
Total	Fourth place	2/13	4	0	0	4	4	17	—

=== AFC Challenge Cup (2006–2014) ===
AFC Challenge Cup record										Qualification record						
Year	Round	Pos.	Pld	W	D	L	GF	GA	Squad	Pos.	Pld	W	D	L	GF	GA
(Bangladesh) 2006	Group stage	13th	3	0	2	1	3	5	Squad	Qualified automatically						
(India) 2008	Group stage	8th	3	0	0	3	0	10	Squad	1st	2	1	1	0	1	0
(Sri Lanka) 2010	Withdrew									Withdrew						
(Nepal) 2012	Did not qualify									3rd	5	3	0	2	6	3
(Maldives) 2014	Fourth place	4th	5	1	3	1	4	4	Squad	1st	3	2	1	0	3	1
Total	Fourth place	3/5	11	1	5	5	7	19	—	3/5	10	6	2	2	10	4

=== CAFA Nations Cup ===
CAFA Nations Cup record
Year	Round	Pos.	Pld	W	D	L	GF	GA	Squad
(Kyrgyzstan) (Uzbekistan) 2023	Group stage	7th	2	0	0	2	1	9	Squad
(Tajikistan) (Uzbekistan) 2025	Group stage	7th	3	0	1	2	1	5	Squad
Total	Group stage	1/1	5	0	1	4	2	14	—

=== SAFF Championship (2003–2015) ===
SAFF Championship records
Year	Round	Pos.	Pld	W	D	L	GF	GA	Squad
(Bangladesh) 2003	Group stage	8th	3	0	0	3	0	6	Squad
(Pakistan) 2005	Group stage	6th	3	1	0	2	3	11	Squad
(Maldives) (Sri Lanka) 2008	Group stage	7th	3	0	2	1	5	7	
(Bangladesh) 2009	Group stage	7th	3	0	0	3	1	7	Squad
(India) 2011	Runners-up	2nd	5	3	1	1	13	7	
(Nepal) 2013	Champions	1st	5	4	1	0	9	1	Squad
(India) 2015	Runners-up	2nd	5	4	0	1	17	3	Squad
Total	1 Title	7/7	27	12	4	11	48	42	—

- Afghanistan were members of the South Asian Football Federation between 2005 and 2015. As a result, they did not enter the competition between 1993 and 1999 and have not entered it since 2015.

== Honours ==
=== Regional ===
- SAFF Championship
  - Champions (1): 2013
  - Runners-up (2): 2011, 2015
- South Asian Games
  - Silver Medal (1): 2010

== See also ==
- Afghanistan women's national football team
- Afghanistan national under-23 football team
- Afghanistan national under-20 football team
- Afghanistan national under-17 football team
- Afghanistan national beach soccer team
- Afghanistan national futsal team
- Afghanistan Football Federation
- Roshan Premier League
- Football in Afghanistan
- Sport in Afghanistan
- Cricket in Afghanistan
