= Habibulla Askar =

Afghan footballer (born 1999)

Habib Askar
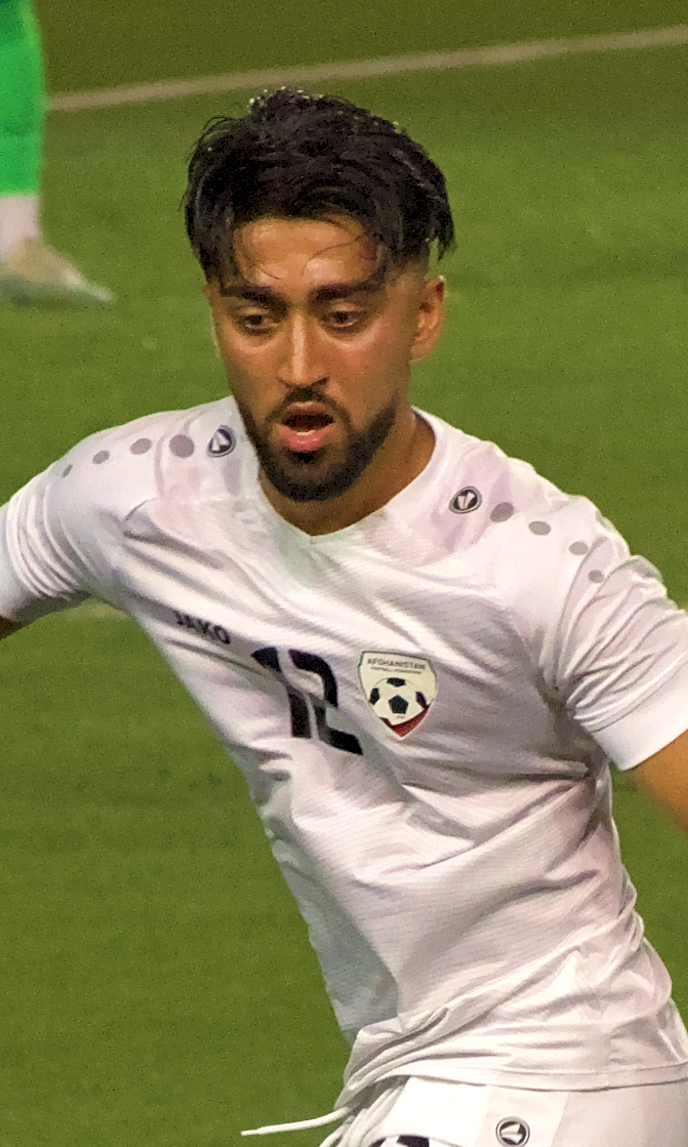
- Askar with Afghanistan in 2023

Personal information
- Full name: Habibulla Askar
- Date of birth: 9 August 1999 (age 27)
- Place of birth: Afghanistan
- Positions: Defender; midfielder

Team information
- Current team: Primetime FC

Senior career*
Years	Team	Apps	(Gls)
2015–2019	IFK Oskarshamn	78	(13)
2020	Oskarshamns AIK	8	(0)
2021	Ariana FC	18	(1)
2022	IFK Berga	23	(0)
2023	Åtvidabergs FF	25	(5)
2024–2025	FK Voska Sport	10	(0)
2025-2026	Bashkimi 1947	9	(0)
2026–	Primetime FC		

International career
2023–	Afghanistan	5	(0)
- * Club domestic league appearances and goals

Habibulla Askar (Dari: حبیب‌الله عسکر; born 9 August 1999) is an Afghan footballer who plays as a defender or midfielder for Primetime FC.

== Club career ==
In 2023, Askar signed for Swedish side Åtvidabergs FF. He was described as a "starting player" while playing for the club.

== International career ==
Askar is an Afghanistan international. He is also a Sweden futsal international.

== Style of play ==
Askar mainly operates as a defender or midfielder. He is known for his technical ability.

== Personal life ==
Askar is of Afghan descent. He is the brother of Afghan footballer Younes Askar.
