= Harun Hamid =

Pakistani footballer

Personal information
- Full name: Harun Ar-Rashid Faheem Hamid
- Date of birth: 10 November 2003 (age 23)
- Place of birth: Lambeth, England
- Height: 1.78 m (5 ft 10 in)
- Positions: Attacking midfielder; winger

Team information
- Current team: Jedinstvo Bihać

Youth career
- 2014–2023: Queens Park Rangers

Senior career*
| Years | Team | Apps | (Gls) |
| 2023 | → Kingstonian (loan) | 5 | (0) |
| 2023–2024 | St Albans City | 11 | (1) |
| 2025 | Farnborough | 6 | (1) |
| 2025–2026 | Flota Świnoujście | 12 | (1) |
| 2026– | Jedinstvo Bihać | | |

International career^{‡}
| 2023– | Pakistan U23 | 3 | (1) |
| 2023– | Pakistan | 18 | (4) |
- * Club domestic league appearances and goals as of 23:00, 21 August 2026 (UTC) ‡ National team caps and goals as of 23:00, 10 June 2026 (UTC)

Harun Ar-Rashid Faheem Hamid (Urdu: ہارون الرشید فہیم حامد; born 10 November 2003) is a footballer who plays as an attacking midfielder and winger for Jedinstvo Bihać. Born in England, he plays for the Pakistan national team.

== Early life ==
Hamid was born in Lambeth in South London. He began playing football with his friends and with his dad before joining a Sunday league side at the age of six.

== Club career ==
=== Queens Park Rangers ===
Hamid entered the academy of Queens Park Rangers at age 11. He participated as a mentor in a club initiative to support Asian inclusion at QPR. He worked his way into a regular starting role with the under-18 side in 2022 while making his debut for the reserve team the following season.

==== Loan to Kingstonian ====
In February 2023 Hamid was loaned out to Kingstonian of the Isthmian League Premier Division on a 1–month deal which would see the player maintain QPR eligibility. He was expected to make his debut for the club on 15 February 2023 in a league match against Hastings United.

In April 2023, it was announced that QPR had opted to not re-sign Hamid and he was released from the club in June 2023.

=== St Albans City ===
On 24 November 2023, Hamid signed for National League South club St Albans City. He scored his first goal for the club on 23 December 2023, in the stoppage time in a 3–0 victory against Dartford.

=== Farnborough ===
On 4 March 2025, months on from his release from St Albans, Hamid joined Farnborough.

=== Flota Świnoujście ===
On 4 July 2025, Hamid joined Polish III liga side Flota Świnoujście.

=== Jedinstvo Bihać ===
In August 2026, Hamid joined Bosnian second tier club Jedinstvo Bihać.

== International career ==
Whilst at QPR, Hamid was flagged up to the Pakistan Football Federation by a volunteer enthusiast from a fan website called FootballPakistan.com, created in 2003 and which had a significant role in connecting diaspora players like Zesh Rehman among others with the national team. Hamid was called up to the Pakistan national team for the first time for a friendly against the Maldives in March 2023. He was one of two foreign-based players in the squad, along with Abdul Arshad of Danish club HB Køge. He made his international debut on 21 March 2023 in the eventual 0–1 away defeat. Following the match, Pakistan manager Shahzad Anwar applauded Hamid's performance, including an acrobatic shot which was the team's best chance on goal.

In summer of 2023, he played in 7 international games for the Pakistan including matches against Kuwait, Kenya and India. In September 2023, Hamid was called up to the Pakistan national under-23 football team for the 2024 AFC U-23 Asian Cup qualification where he played 3 matches playing the likes of Japan, Bahrain and Palestine, he scored a goal in that campaign against Palestine which ended in a 2–1 defeat.

On 17 October 2023, Hamid made history for Pakistan by scoring his debut goal in a 1–0 win against Cambodia in the second leg of the first round of the 2026 FIFA World Cup qualification, to be Pakistan's first ever victory in a World Cup qualifying match, which sent them through to the second round by winning 1–0 on aggregate.

Hamid was top goal scorer in the 2026 Diamond Jubilee International Football Tournament held in The Maldives, where he came on as a substitute three times and scored three goals in three matches helping Pakistan win the title.

== Style of play ==
Hamid is a player who operates on the wings as well as in midfield positions. Hamid has been recognized for his speed, technique, dribbling, and playmaking abilities.

== Career statistics ==
=== Club ===
As of match played 14 March 2026

Appearances and goals by club, season and competition
| Club | Season | League | | | National cup (Note: Includes Polish Cup) | | EFL Cup | | Other | | Total | |
| Club | Season | Division | Apps | Goals | Apps | Goals | Apps | Goals | Apps | Goals | Apps | Goals |
|---|---|---|---|---|---|---|---|---|---|---|---|---|
| Queens Park Rangers | 2022–23 | Championship | 0 | 0 | 0 | 0 | 0 | 0 | — | | 0 | 0 |
| Kingstonian (loan) | 2022–23 | Isthmian League Premier Division | 5 | 0 | — | | — | | — | | 5 | 0 |
| St Albans City | 2023–24 | National League South | 11 | 1 | — | | — | | — | | 11 | 1 |
| Farnborough | 2024–25 | National League South | 6 | 1 | — | | — | | — | | 6 | 1 |
| Flota Świnoujście | 2025–26 | III liga, group II | 12 | 1 | 1 | 0 | — | | — | | 13 | 1 |
| Career total | | | 34 | 3 | 1 | 0 | 0 | 0 | 0 | 0 | 35 | 3 |

=== International ===
As of match played 10 June 2026

Appearances and goals by national team and year
| National team | Year | Apps | Goals |
|---|---|---|---|
| Pakistan | 2023 | 11 | 1 |
| Pakistan | 2024 | 2 | 0 |
| Pakistan | 2025 | 2 | 0 |
| Pakistan | 2026 | 3 | 3 |
| Total | | 18 | 4 |

Scores and results list Pakistan's goal tally first, score column indicates score after each Hamid goal.

List of international goals scored by Harun Hamid
| No. | Date | Venue | Opponent | Score | Result | Competition |
|---|---|---|---|---|---|---|
| 1 | 17 October 2023 | Jinnah Sports Stadium, Islamabad, Pakistan | Cambodia | 1–0 | 1–0 | 2026 FIFA World Cup qualification |
| 2 | 4 June 2026 | National Football Stadium, Malé, Maldives | Maldives | 3–0 | 3–0 | 2026 Diamond Jubilee International Football Tournament |
| 3 | 7 June 2026 | National Football Stadium, Malé, Maldives | Afghanistan | 2–0 | 2–0 | 2026 Diamond Jubilee International Football Tournament |
| 4 | 10 June 2026 | National Football Stadium, Malé, Maldives | Afghanistan | 2–0 | 2–0 | 2026 Diamond Jubilee International Football Tournament |

== Honours ==
Pakistan

- Diamond Jubilee International Football Tournament: 2026

== See also ==
- British Asians in association football
- List of Pakistan international footballers born outside Pakistan
