= Keyvan Mottaghian =

Afghan footballer

Personal information
- Date of birth: 16 November 2002 (age 23)
- Place of birth: Paris, France
- Height: 1.85 m (6 ft 1 in)
- Position: Goalkeeper

Team information
- Current team: Valenzuela PB-Mendiola, on loan from One Taguig
- Number: 23

Youth career
- 2020–2021: ES Nanterre
- 2021–2022: ES Seizième

Senior career*
Years	Team	Apps	(Gls)
2021–2022	AC Boulogne-Billancourt		
2022–2023	APEP FC	3	(0)
2023	Vrigstads IF		
2023–2025	APOP Polis	4	(0)
2024–2025	→Abu Muslim (loan)		
2025–2026	Issy-les-Moulineaux		
2025–	One Taguig	0	(0)
2025–	→Valenzuela PB-Mendiola (loan)	9	(0)

International career^{‡}
2024–	Afghanistan	3	(0)
- * Club domestic league appearances and goals as of 14:36, 2 June 2026 (UTC) ‡ National team caps and goals as of 14:36, 2 June 2026 (UTC)

Keyvan Mottaghian (Dari: کیوان متقیان; born 16 November 2002) is an Iranian-Afghan professional footballer who plays as a goalkeeper for Valenzuela PB-Mendiola in the Philippines Football League, on loan from One Taguig. Born in France, he plays for the Afghanistan national team.

== Club career ==
Mottaghian was born in Paris and developed through French youth football before beginning his professional career at AC Boulogne-Billancourt in the Régional 1 Paris-Île-de-France in 2021. In 2022 he moved to Cyprus, joining APEP FC of the G Kategoria, making three appearances before a brief spell at Swedish club Vrigstads IF in February 2023.

He returned to Cyprus to join APOP Polis, making four appearances in the G Kategoria during the 2024–25 season, and was briefly loaned out to Abu Muslim of Afghanistan. His performances attracted attention from Paris Saint-Germain, whose scouts invited him to train with the club's reserve side. He subsequently joined Issy-les-Moulineaux in the Régional 3 before moving to the Philippines Football League with Valenzuela PB-Mendiola in February 2026 on loan from One Taguig.

== International career ==
Born to an Iranian father and an Afghan mother, Mottaghian initially expressed a desire to represent Iran internationally. However, after being invited to Afghanistan's training camp in January 2024 by head coach Ashley Westwood, he chose to represent Afghanistan, qualifying through his mother's nationality.

Mottaghian was named in Afghanistan's squad for their FIFA World Cup 2026 qualifying matches against Qatar and Kuwait in June 2024. He was once again called up for the 2025 CAFA Nations Cup, where he debuted as a substitute against Tajikistan. He made his competitive debut for Afghanistan in a AFC Asian Cup 2027 qualifying match against Myanmar on 26 March 2026, with Afghanistan losing 2–1.
