= Rahis Nabi =

Pakistani footballer

Personal information
- Full name: Rahis Nabi
- Date of birth: 15 April 1999 (age 27)
- Place of birth: Birmingham, England
- Position: Midfielder

Team information
- Current team: Sporting Khalsa

Youth career
- 2016–2017: West Bromwich Albion
- 2017: Sunderland
- 2017–2018: Burnley

Senior career*
Years	Team	Apps	(Gls)
2018–2020	Alvechurch	19	(2)
2021–2022	Redditch Utd	4	(0)
2023–2024	Digenis Morphou	22	(2)
2025–2026	Halesowen Town	1	(0)
2026–	Sporting Khalsa		

International career^{‡}
2016	England U17	3	(0)
2019–	Pakistan	19	(1)
- * Club domestic league appearances and goals as of 27 April 2024 ‡ National team caps and goals as of 18 November 2025

Rahis Nabi (Urdu: راہس نبی; born 15 April 1999) is a footballer who plays as a midfielder for Sporting Khalsa. Born in England, he represents Pakistan internationally.

== Club career ==
=== Early career ===
Nabi played youth football for West Bromwich Albion, and scored in a single youth game for Sunderland on 8 April 2017. In July 2017, after leaving West Brom, he signed a one-year deal at Burnley's development squad.

=== Alvechurch ===
Nabi later played at senior level for Alvechurch of the seventh tier Southern Football League Central Division, joining the club on 14 December 2018.

On 12 January 2019, Nabi scored his first goal with a free kick in the 44th minute, on a 1–0 home victory at the derby over Halesowen Town. On 21 January 2019, he scored again through a free kick in the 41st minute, on a 2–2 draw against Stratford Town. He was subsequently declared player of the month.

=== Redditch ===
On 27 July 2021, Nabi signed for Redditch United in the same division, after successfully completing his trials.

=== Digenis Morphou ===
In July 2023 after a year as a free agent, Rahis trained in Cyprus along with his brother Adil Nabi, a week after he joined the Cypriot First Division club Doxa Katokopias. On 28 August 2023, Rahis Nabi first signed for Eendracht Aalst in the fourth tier Belgian Division 2 on a three-year contract, however the deal collapsed in extremis. On 8 September 2023, Rahis Nabi joined Digenis Akritas Morphou in the Cypriot Second Division.

=== Halesowen Town ===
In September 2025, Nabi joined Southern League Premier Division Central side Halesowen Town.

=== Sporting Khalsa ===
In March 2026, Nabi joined Sporting Khalsa.

== International career ==
As a junior, he was a member of the England Under-17 squad.

In May 2019, Nabi and his brother Samir were called up for Pakistan's 2022 FIFA World Cup qualifiers against Cambodia the following month. He made his debut on 6 June 2019, as a starter in a 0–2 loss. He scored his first international goal on 21 November 2023 against Tajikistan in the 2026 FIFA World Cup qualification.

== Personal life ==
Rahis Nabi is the youngest of three British Pakistani brothers, Adil Nabi and Samir Nabi, who came through the West Bromwich Albion academy.

== Career statistics ==
=== Club ===
As of 18 January 2024

Appearances and goals by club, season and competition
Club	Season	League			National Cup		League Cup		Other		Total	
Club	Season	Division	Apps	Goals	Apps	Goals	Apps	Goals	Apps	Goals	Apps	Goals
Alvechurch	2018–19	Southern Football League	15	2	0	0	0	0	0	0	15	2
Alvechurch	2019–20	Southern Football League	4	0	2	0	0	0	1 (Note: Appearances in JW Hunt Cup)	1	7	1
Redditch United	2021–22	Southern Football league	4	0	1	0	0	0	0	0	5	0
Redditch United	Total		23	2	3	0	0	0	1	1	27	3
Digenis Morphou	2023–24	Cypriot Second Division	14	2	0	0	0	0	0	0	0	0
Digenis Morphou	Total		14	2	0	0	0	0	0	0	14	2
Career total			37	4	3	0	0	0	1	1	41	5

=== International ===
As of 18 November 2025

Appearances and goals by national team and year
National team	Year	Apps	Goals
Pakistan	2019	2	0
Pakistan	2023	10	1
Pakistan	2024	4	0
Pakistan	2025	3	0
Total		19	1

Scores and results list Pakistan's goal tally first, score column indicates score after each Nabi goal.

List of international goals scored by Rahis Nabi
No.	Date	Venue	Opponent	Score	Result	Competition
1	21 November 2023	Jinnah Sports Stadium, Islamabad, Pakistan	Tajikistan	1–2	1–6	2026 FIFA World Cup qualification

== Honours ==
Pakistan

- Diamond Jubilee International Football Tournament: 2026

== See also ==
- British Asians in association football
- List of Pakistan international footballers born outside Pakistan
