= Roman Fazi =

Afghan footballer

Personal information
- Date of birth: 10 February 1999 (age 27)
- Place of birth: Borgen, Asker, Norway
- Height: 1.72 m (5 ft 8 in)
- Position: Midfielder

Team information
- Current team: Asker
- Number: 16

Youth career
- 2016–2017: Asker

Senior career*
Years	Team	Apps	(Gls)
2017–	Asker	150	(52)

International career^{‡}
2026–	Afghanistan	1	(1)
- * Club domestic league appearances and goals as of 15:29, 2 June 2026 (UTC) ‡ National team caps and goals as of 15:29, 2 June 2026 (UTC)

Roman Fazi (Dari: رومان فاضی; born 10 February 1999) is a professional footballer who plays as a midfielder for Asker in the Norwegian Second Division. Born in Norway, he plays for the Afghanistan internationally.

== Club career ==
Fazi has spent his entire senior career at Asker, based in Asker, Norway, having joined the club in 2016. He is known at the club as a technically gifted and creative midfielder with a particular reputation for free kicks.

Fazi made his senior competitive debut in 2017 in the Norwegian Second Division. After spending much of the 2021 season in rehabilitation from injury, he signed a contract extension with Asker ahead of the 2022 season, with the club describing him as eager to prove himself. Following a difficult end to the 2022 season in which he considered leaving the club, Fazi ultimately chose to remain at Asker, with coach Bredal describing him as having football in his blood and praising his creativity and goal-scoring ability.

Fazi has accumulated 114 appearances and 51 goals across all competitions for Asker, establishing himself as one of the club's most prolific attacking midfielders. His most productive individual season came in 2024, when he scored 21 goals in 12 appearances in the Norwegian Third Division. He followed that with 8 goals in 9 appearances in the Norwegian Second Division in 2025, finishing as the club's top scorer.

== International career ==
Born in Norway and of Afghan descent, Fazi represents Afghanistan internationally. He was called up to Afghanistan for the 2026 Diamond Jubilee International Football Tournament, a four-nation competition held in Malé, Maldives from 1–10 June 2026, organised to celebrate the 75th anniversary of football in the Maldives.

In his debut appearance against hosts Maldives on 1 June 2026, Fazi scored the only goal of the match in the 80th minute, giving Afghanistan a 1–0 victory.

=== International goals ===
No.	Date	Venue	Opponent	Score	Result	Competition
1.	1 June 2026	National Football Stadium, Malé, Maldives	Maldives	1–0	1–0	2026 Diamond Jubilee International Football Tournament
