= Umar Nawaz (footballer) =

Pakistani footballer

Personal information
- Date of birth: 28 September 2007 (age 19)
- Place of birth: Peshawar, Pakistan
- Height: 1.91 m (6 ft 3 in)
- Position: Forward

Team information
- Current team: Kajaanin Haka

Youth career
- 2017–2022: Bournville Academy
- 2022–2023: Wolverhampton Wanderers
- 2024–2026: Wrexham

Senior career*
| Years | Team | Apps | (Gls) |
| 2024–2026 | Wrexham | 0 | (0) |
| 2026– | Kajaanin Haka | | |

International career^{‡}
| 2025– | Pakistan | 6 | (2) |
- * Club domestic league appearances and goals as of 00:16, 20 November 2025 (UTC) ‡ National team caps and goals as of 15:06, 2 October 2026 (UTC)

Umar Nawaz (عمر نواز; born 28 September 2007) is a Pakistani professional footballer who plays as a forward for Kolmonen club Kajaanin Haka and the Pakistan national team.

== Early life ==
Born in Peshawar, Pakistan, his brother Haris was killed, with another brother, Ahmad, injured during the 2014 Peshawar school massacre. Nawaz and his family moved to England after, in 2015.

== Club career ==
In 2017, shortly after moving to England, he joined Bournville Academy, before signing with Wolverhampton Wanderers in 2022. On 10 July 2024, he joined the youth academy of Wrexham. He left Wrexham on 15 May 2026 without making a single senior appearance for the club.

In September 2026, Nawaz began playing for Finnish club Kajaanin Haka in the Kolmonen league.

== International career ==
In November 2025, Nawaz was called up to the Pakistan national team for a set of 2027 AFC Asian Cup qualification matches. He made his debut on 18 November 2025, coming on as a substitute for Abdullah Shah in a 0–5 loss to Syria.

== Career statistics ==
=== International ===
As of match played 2 October 2026

Appearances and goals by national team and year
| National team | Year | Apps | Goals |
|---|---|---|---|
| Pakistan | 2025 | 1 | 0 |
| Pakistan | 2026 | 5 | 2 |
| Total | | 6 | 2 |

Scores and results list Pakistan's goal tally first, score column indicates score after each Nawaz goal.

List of international goals scored by Umar Nawaz
| No. | Date | Venue | Cap | Opponent | Score | Result | Competition |
|---|---|---|---|---|---|---|---|
| 1 | 4 June 2026 | National Football Stadium, Malé, Maldives | 2 | Maldives | 1–0 | 3–0 | 2026 Diamond Jubilee International Football Tournament |
| 2 | 7 June 2026 | National Football Stadium, Malé, Maldives | 3 | Afghanistan | 1–0 | 2–0 | 2026 Diamond Jubilee International Football Tournament |

== Honours ==
Pakistan

- Diamond Jubilee International Football Tournament: 2026
