= Time in the Maldives =

Maldives Time
- Time zone
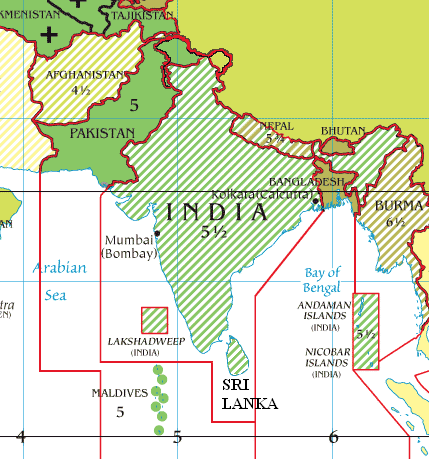
- Map of South Asia with time zones; "Maldives 5" indicates Maldives Time.

UTC offset
- MVT: UTC+05:00

Current time
- 12:21, 26 August 2026 MVT [refresh]

Observance of DST
- DST is not observed in this time zone.

Time in the Maldives is given by Maldives Time (MVT) (UTC+05:00). However, some island resorts operate their own time zone, known as Maldives Island Time, up to 2 hours ahead of the official Maldives Time. The Maldives does not currently observe daylight saving time as daylight hours do not vary in Maldives because the country is located on the equator.
