= Elias Mansor =

Afghan footballer

Personal information
- Date of birth: 2 September 2006 (age 20)
- Place of birth: Kabul, Afghanistan
- Height: 1.86 m (6 ft 1 in)
- Position: Midfielder

Team information
- Current team: Millwall

Youth career
- 2015–2025: Millwall

Senior career*
Years	Team	Apps	(Gls)
2025–	Millwall	0	(0)

International career^{‡}
2025–	Afghanistan	2	(0)
- * Club domestic league appearances and goals as of 16:29, 12 September 2025 (UTC) ‡ National team caps and goals as of 16:29, 12 September 2025 (UTC)

Elias Mansor (Dari: الیاس منصور; born 2 September 2006) is an Afghan professional footballer who plays as a midfielder for Millwall and the Afghanistan national team.

== Club career ==
Mansor joined the youth academy of Millwall as a U8. He signed his first professional contract with the club on 8 August 2025.

== International career ==
Mansor made the squad for the Afghanistan national team at the 2025 CAFA Nations Cup

Mansor, nineteen, made his international debut in defeat to Iran in the CAFA Nations Cup in August 2025, shortly after signing his first professional deal with Millwall.

He started again against Tajikistan three days later before featuring against Myanmar and Syria in Asian Cup qualifying in March 2026.
