= Abdul Arshad =

Pakistani footballer (born 2003)

Abdul Samad Arshad
Personal information
- Full name: Abdul Samad Shahzad Arshad
- Date of birth: 26 February 2003 (age 23)
- Place of birth: Denmark
- Height: 1.83 m (6 ft 0 in)
- Position: Right winger

Team information
- Current team: Kolding
- Number: 11

Youth career
- 2020–2022: B.93

Senior career*
| Years | Team | Apps | (Gls) |
| 2021–2022 | B.93 | 1 | (0) |
| 2022–2023 | HB Køge | 14 | (1) |
| 2023–2024 | HIK | 13 | (2) |
| 2024 | FA 2000 | 1 | (0) |
| 2024 | Ishøj IF | 6 | (1) |
| 2025 | Eskilsminne IF | 13 | (1) |
| 2025 | Brønshøj | 13 | (4) |
| 2026– | Kolding | 13 | (0) |

International career^{‡}
| 2023– | Pakistan | 18 | (3) |
- * Club domestic league appearances and goals as of 2 June 2026 ‡ National team caps and goals as of 14 November 2026

Abdul Samad Shahzad Arshad (Urdu: عبدالصمد شہزاد ارشد; born 26 February 2003) is a professional footballer who plays as a winger for Danish 1st Division club Kolding IF. Born in Denmark, he represents the Pakistan national team.

== Club career ==
=== B.93 ===
In 2022, Abdul won the 2nd Division U19 League with BB.93 and was the team's top scorer with 20 goals. On 13 November 2021, he made his senior team debut in the Danish 2nd Division against FA 2000.

=== HB Køge ===
On 11 February 2022, Abdul joined HB Køge in the Danish 1st Division. Initially he played for the team in the 1st Division U19 League before becoming a regular in the senior team midway through the season. Abdul left HB Køge at the end of the 2022–23 season, as his contract expired.

=== HIK ===
On 14 July 2023, he reached an agreement to sign for Hellerup IK in the Danish 2nd Division.

=== FA 2000 ===
On 1 August 2024 it was confirmed that Arshad moved to Danish 3rd Division club FA 2000.

=== Ishøj ===
After only playing one match with the previous club, Arshad moved to Ishøj IF in the Danish 2nd Division on 2 September 2024.

=== Eskilsminne IF ===
On 1 March 2025, Abdul joined Esilksminne IF on a one-year deal. He left the club in the beginning of August 2025, after terminating his contract.

=== Brønshøj ===
After leaving Sweden, Arshed joined Danish 3rd Division club Brønshøj Boldklub.

=== Kolding IF ===
On 25 January 2026, Abdul Arshad signed for Danish 1st Division club Kolding IF after a trial period in which he appeared in multiple training matches for the club. The club officially announced the acquisition, noting that Arshad joined from Brønshøj Boldklub and had participated in two recent friendlies prior to the agreement.

== International career ==
In March 2023, Abdul was called up to the Pakistan national team for a friendly against the Maldives. On 21 March 2023, he made his international debut in an eventual 0–1 defeat to the Maldives.

== Career statistics ==
=== Club ===
As of 7 April 2025

Appearances and goals by club, season and competition
| Club | Season | League | | | National cup | | Europe | | Total | |
| Club | Season | Division | Apps | Goals | Apps | Goals | Apps | Goals | Apps | Goals |
|---|---|---|---|---|---|---|---|---|---|---|
| BB.93 | 2021–22 | 2nd Division | 1 | 0 | 0 | 0 | — | | 1 | 0 |
| HB Køge | 2022–23 | 1st Division | 14 | 1 | 3 | 1 | — | | 16 | 2 |
| Hellerup IK | 2023-24 | 2nd Division | 13 | 2 | 1 | 0 | — | | 14 | 2 |
| Eskilsminne IF | 2024-25 | Ettan Futboll | 10 | 1 | — | | — | | 2 | 0 |
| Career total | | | 38 | 4 | 4 | 1 | 0 | 0 | 17 | 4 |

=== International ===
As of 14 November 2026

Appearances and goals by national team and year
| National team | Year | Apps | Goals |
|---|---|---|---|
| Pakistan | 2023 | 6 | 0 |
| Pakistan | 2024 | 2 | 0 |
| Pakistan | 2025 | 3 | 0 |
| Pakistan | 2026 | 7 | 3 |
| Total | | 18 | 3 |

Scores and results list Pakistan's goal tally first, score column indicates score after each Arshad goal.

List of international goals scored by Abdul Arshad
| No. | Date | Venue | Opponent | Score | Result | Competition |
|---|---|---|---|---|---|---|
| 1 | 4 June 2026 | National Football Stadium, Malé, Maldives | Maldives | 2–0 | 3–0 | 2026 Diamond Jubilee International Football Tournament |
| 2 | 29 September 2026 | Si Jalak Harupat Stadium, Bandung, Indonesia | Philippines | 2–2 | 2–2 | 2026 FIFA ASEAN Cup |
| 3 | 14 November 2026 | National Stadium, Dhaka, Bangladesh | Bangladesh | 1–0 | 1–0 | 2026 SAFF Championship |

== Honours ==
Pakistan

- Diamond Jubilee International Football Tournament: 2026

== See also ==
- List of Pakistan international footballers born outside Pakistan
