= 2026 Diamond Jubilee International Football Tournament =

Tournament details
- Host country: Maldives (FAM)
- Dates: 1–10 June
- Teams: 4 (from 1 sub-confederation)
- Venue(s): National Stadium, Malé

Final positions
- Champions: Pakistan
- Runners-up: Afghanistan

Tournament statistics
- Matches played: 7
- Goals scored: 10 (1.43 per match)
- Attendance: 6,151 (879 per match)
- Top scorer(s): (Pakistan) Harun Hamid (3 goals)
- Best player: (Pakistan) Otis Khan

The 2026 Diamond Jubilee International Football Tournament was a four-nation international association football tournament held in the Maldives from 1 to 10 June 2026. The tournament was organized by the Football Association of Maldives.

== Overview ==
The tournament was played to celebrate the 75th anniversary of Maldivian football. It also served as preparation for the 2026 SAFF Championship for the local national teams. Maldives hosted similar tournaments before, such as the Maldives Football Golden Jubilee Invitational Tournament in May 2000, where Sri Lanka defeated the hosts in the final.

Sri Lanka withdrew despite earlier confirmation, and was replaced by Afghanistan. Although initial reports indicated that Bangladesh would field a split senior squad, with another team simultaneously engaged in a friendly tour of Europe, they ultimately entered with the Olympic team.

== Participating nations ==
The following four nations participated in the tournament.

FIFA rankings, as of 1 April 2026.

Nation	FIFA ranking	Confederation
Maldives (H)	172	AFC
Afghanistan	169	AFC
Pakistan	198	AFC
Bangladesh Olympic	—N/a	AFC

== Venue ==
The National Football Stadium of Malé hosted all the matches.

Malé	2026 Diamond Jubilee International Football Tournament is located in Maldives
National Football Stadium	2026 Diamond Jubilee International Football Tournament is located in Maldives
Capacity: 4,000	2026 Diamond Jubilee International Football Tournament is located in Maldives

== Squads ==
Each team was required to registered a squad with a minimum of 18 players and a maximum of 23 players, at least three of whom had to be goalkeepers.

== Match officials ==
Referees

- (Maldives) Javiz Mohamed
- (Maldives) Sinan Hussain
- (India) Aditya Purkayastha
- (India) Ashwin Kumar
- (India) Senthilnathan Sekaran

Assistant Referees & Fourth Officials

- (Maldives) Hassan Ahmed
- (Maldives) Rauf Raeef
- (India) Ujjal Halder
- (India) Pandurangan Muralitharan
- (India) Christopher Peter

== Standings ==
Pos	Team	Pld	W	D	L	GF	GA	GD	Pts	Status
1	Pakistan (C)	3	2	1	0	5	0	+5	7	Champions
2	Afghanistan	3	1	1	1	1	2	−1	4	Runners-up
3	Bangladesh Olympic	3	0	3	0	1	1	0	3	
4	Maldives (H)	3	0	1	2	1	5	−4	1	

Source: DJIFT
(C) Champions; (H) Hosts

== Matches ==
All times are local, MVT (UTC+5)

1 June 2026
16:00

Pakistan	0–0	Bangladesh Olympic
	Report

National Football Stadium, Malé
Attendance: 1,200
Referee: Javiz Mohamed (Maldives)
1 June 2026
21:00

Maldives	0–1	Afghanistan
	Report	Fazi 80'

National Football Stadium, Malé
Attendance: 1,028
Referee: Aditya Purkayastha (India)

4 June 2026
16:00

Maldives	0–3	Pakistan
	Report	Nawaz 53'; Arshad 84'; Hamid 87'

National Football Stadium, Malé
Attendance: 1,050
Referee: Ashwin Kumar (India)
4 June 2026
21:00

Afghanistan	0–0	Bangladesh Olympic
	Report

National Football Stadium, Malé
Referee: Senthilnathan Sekaran (India)

7 June 2026
16:00

Afghanistan	0–2	Pakistan
	Report	Nawaz 5'; Hamid 90+2'

National Football Stadium, Malé
Attendance: 450
Referee: Sinan Hussain (Maldives)
7 June 2026
21:00

Maldives	1–1	Bangladesh Olympic
Fasir 14' (pen.)	Report	Mirajul 54' (pen.)

National Football Stadium, Malé
Attendance: 2,150
Referee: Senthilnathan Sekaran (India)

== Final ==
10 June 2026
21:00

Pakistan	2–0	Afghanistan
Shayak 24'; Hamid 90+4'	Report

National Football Stadium, Malé
Attendance: 273
Referee: Aditya Purkayastha (India)

== Champions ==
Diamond Jubilee Football Tournament 2026

Pakistan

== Statistics ==
=== Goalscorers ===
There have been 10 goals scored in 7 matches, for an average of 1.43 goals per match.

3 goals

- (Pakistan) Harun Hamid

2 goals

- (Pakistan) Umar Nawaz

1 goal

- (Pakistan) Shayak Dost
- (Bangladesh) Mirajul Islam
- (Afghanistan) Roman Fazi
- (Maldives) Ali Fasir
- (Pakistan) Abdul Arshad

Source: GSA

== Awards ==
Awards
Champions	Pakistan
Runners-up	Afghanistan
Most valuable player	(Pakistan) Otis Khan
Top scorer	(Pakistan) Harun Hamid

== Broadcasting ==
Territory	Broadcaster(s)	Reference
No restricted territory	YES TV^{(YouTube channel)}	2026 Diamond Jubilee Football Tournament playlist on YouTube
