= 1999 SAFF Gold Cup squads =

Football squads of South Asian competition

The 1999 South Asian Football Federation Gold Cup is an international football tournament held in India from 22 April to 1 May 1999. The six national teams involved in the tournament were required to register a squad of 23 players, including three goalkeepers. Only players in these squads were eligible to take part in the tournament.

== India ==
Coach: (India) Sukhwinder Singh

No.	Pos.	Player	Date of birth (age)	Caps	Goals	Club
	GK	Kalyan Chaubey	16 December 1976 (aged 22)			(India) East Bengal
	GK	Virender Singh	15 December 1974 (aged 24)			(India) JCT Mills
	GK	Prasanta Dora	4 January 1976 (aged 23)			(India) Calcutta Port Trust
	DF	Roberto Fernandes	2 November 1971 (aged 27)			(India) Salgacoar
	DF	Daljit Singh	24 June 1976 (aged 22)			(India) JCT Mills
	DF	Deepak Kumar Mondal	12 October 1979 (aged 19)			(India) JCT Mills
	DF	Reazul Mustafa	22 December 1975 (aged 23)			(India) Mohun Bagan
	DF	Prabhjot Singh	8 March 1980 (aged 19)			(India) Kochin
	MF	Carlton Chapman	13 April 1971 (aged 28)			(India) East Bengal
	MF	Shanmugam Venkatesh	23 November 1978 (aged 20)			(India) Salgacoar
	MF	Jules Alberto Dias	5 November 1972 (aged 26)			(India) Salgacoar
	MF	Ranjan Dey	10 June 1974 (aged 24)			(India) East Bengal
	MF	Hardip Singh Gill	14 December 1977 (aged 21)			(India) JCT Mills
	MF	Basudeb Mondal	6 July 1974 (aged 24)			(India) East Bengal
	FW	Bhaichung Bhutia	15 December 1976 (aged 22)			(India) East Bengal
	FW	I.M. Vijayan	25 April 1969 (aged 29)			(India) Mohun Bagan
	FW	Bruno Coutinho	6 October 1969 (aged 29)			(India) Salgacoar
	FW	Jo Paul Ancheri	2 August 1975 (aged 23)			(India) Mohun Bagan
	FW	Syed Sabir Pasha	5 November 1972 (aged 26)			(India) Indian Bank
		Ram Pal				(India)

== Bangladesh ==
Coach: (Iraq) Samir Shaker

No.	Pos.	Player	Date of birth (age)	Caps	Goals	Club
	GK	Aminul Haque	5 October 1980 (aged 18)			(Bangladesh) Abahani Limited
	GK	Biplob Bhattacharjee	7 January 1981 (aged 18)			(Bangladesh) Abahani Limited
	DF	Mustafa Anwar Parvez Babu	25 July 1978 (aged 20)			(Bangladesh) Badda Jagoroni
	DF	Kazi Nazrul Islam	16 October 1978 (aged 20)			(Bangladesh) Farashganj
	DF	Pradeep Kumar Poddar	5 February 1979 (aged 20)			(Bangladesh) Muktijoddha Sangsad
	DF	Mohammed Jewel Rana	12 May 1968 (aged 30)			(Bangladesh) Muktijoddha Sangsad
	DF	Rajani Kanta Barman	12 May 1976 (aged 22)			(Bangladesh) Muktijoddha Sangsad
	DF	Hassan Al-Mamun	16 November 1974 (aged 24)			(Bangladesh) Muktijoddha Sangsad
	DF	Masoud Rana	1 January 1972 (aged 27)			(Bangladesh) Muktijoddha Sangsad
	MF	Iqbal Hossain	7 July 1975 (aged 23)			(Bangladesh) Abahani Limited
	MF	Motiur Rahman Munna	1 September 1979 (aged 19)			(Bangladesh) Mohammedan
	MF	Monwar Hossain	30 August 1979 (aged 19)			(Bangladesh) Badda Jagoroni
	MF	Zakir Hossain	10 December 1971 (aged 27)			(Bangladesh) Abahani Limited
	FW	Rakib Hossain	10 March 1973 (aged 26)			(Bangladesh) Mohammedan
	FW	Sourav Majumder Raju	14 April 1975 (aged 24)			(Bangladesh) Rahmatganj MFS
	FW	Alfaz Ahmed	6 June 1973 (aged 25)			(Bangladesh) Mohammedan
	FW	Mizanur Rahman Dawn	1 May 1975 (aged 23)			(Bangladesh) Mohammedan
	FW	Shahajuddin Tipu	16 January 1974 (aged 25)			(Bangladesh) Rahmatganj MFS
	FW	Imtiaz Ahmed Nakib	1 September 1969 (aged 29)			(Bangladesh) Muktijoddha Sangsad

== Pakistan ==
Coach: (Pakistan) Muhammad Idrees

No.	Pos.	Player	Date of birth (age)	Caps	Goals	Club
	GK	Muhammad Younis	1 November 1974 (aged 24)			(Pakistan) Allied Bank
	GK	Zahid Taj	3 November 1972 (aged 26)			(Pakistan) National Bank
	DF	Zahid Rafiq	1971			(Pakistan) Allied Bank
	DF	Bashir Ahmad	10 March 1970 (aged 29)			(Pakistan) Allied Bank
	DF	Pervaiz Ahmed	1968			(Pakistan) Habib Bank
	DF	Muhammad Amir Khan	10 December 1979 (aged 19)			(Pakistan) Allied Bank
	DF	Muhammad Tariq Hussain	15 September 1970 (aged 28)			(Pakistan) Habib Bank
	DF	Tanveer Ahmed	15 April 1976 (aged 23)			(Pakistan) Crescent Textile Mills
	MF	Nasir Ismail	17 July 1967 (aged 31)			(Pakistan) National Bank
	MF	Haroon Yousaf	10 November 1973 (aged 25)			(Pakistan) Allied Bank
	MF	Sarfraz Rasool	10 July 1975 (aged 23)			(Pakistan) Punjab Medical Center
	MF	Abdul Ghaffar	14 July 1972 (aged 26)			(Pakistan) PIA
	MF	Muhammad Arshad	10 October 1976 (aged 22)			Pakistan Air Force
	FW	Shahid Saleem	7 December 1976 (aged 22)			(Pakistan) Habib Bank
	FW	Babar Mehmood	27 May 1974 (aged 24)			Pakistan Army
	FW	Muhammad Umar	2 March 1973 (aged 26)			(Pakistan) PIA
	FW	Zahid Niaz	21 June 1977 (aged 21)			(Pakistan) PIA
	FW	Amjad Zakariya	15 May 1971 (aged 27)			(Pakistan) Allied Bank

== Sri Lanka ==
Coach: (Sri Lanka) Subhani Hassimdeen

No.	Pos.	Player	Date of birth (age)	Caps	Goals	Club
	GK	Sugath Dammika Thilakaratne	6 October 1977 (aged 21)			(Sri Lanka) Renown
	DF	Imthyas Raheem	14 July 1972 (aged 26)			Sri Lanka Air Force
	DF	Dudley Lincoln Steinwall	9 November 1974 (aged 24)			(Sri Lanka) Renown
	DF	Samantha Prabath Mudiyanselage	11 April 1978 (aged 21)			(Sri Lanka)
	DF	Kamaldeen Mohamed Anees	17 September 1975 (aged 23)			(Sri Lanka)
	MF	Imran Mohamed	12 September 1977 (aged 21)			(Sri Lanka) Saunders
	MF	Kamaldeen Kabeer	18 November 1974 (aged 24)			(Sri Lanka)
	MF	TN Bagoos				(Sri Lanka)
	FW	Isuru Perera	11 January 1976 (aged 23)			(Sri Lanka) Saunders
	FW	Roshan Perera	1 September 1970 (aged 28)			(India) Mohun Bagan
	FW	Mohamed Amanulla				(Sri Lanka) Ratnam
	FW	Kasun Jayasuriya	25 March 1980 (aged 19)			(Sri Lanka) Pettah United
		Fazal Mohamed Fauzan				(Sri Lanka)

== Maldives ==
Coach: (Uzbekistan) Vyacheslav Solokho

No.	Pos.	Player	Date of birth (age)	Caps	Goals	Club
	GK	Ishak Essa				(Maldives)
	DF	Mohamed Ibrahim	7 November 1970 (aged 28)			(Maldives)
	DF	Hussain Luthfy	4 June 1975 (aged 23)			(Maldives) Hurriyya
	DF	Yoosuf Azeem	2 February 1973 (aged 26)			(Maldives) Hurriyya
	DF	Ali Shahin	1 October 1972 (aged 26)			(Maldives) Victory
	MF	Mohamed Hussain	12 October 1979 (aged 19)			(Maldives) New Radiant
	MF	Abdullah Waheed				(Maldives)
	MF	Ali Umar	5 August 1980 (aged 18)			(Maldives) Club Valencia
	MF	Ashraf Luthfy	16 June 1973 (aged 25)			(Maldives) New Radiant
	MF	Mohamed Nazeeh	15 May 1976 (aged 22)			(Maldives) New Radiant
	FW	Ali Shiham	26 June 1975 (aged 23)			(Maldives) Hurriyya
	FW	Mohamed Thoddoo Nizam	17 May 1974 (aged 24)			(Maldives) Club Valencia
	FW	Ismail Shah	14 February 1971 (aged 28)			(Maldives) New Radiant
	FW	Mohamed Wildhan				(Maldives)
	FW	Mausoom Abdul Ghafoor	20 March 1976 (aged 23)			(Maldives) Hurriyya

== Nepal ==
Coach: (Germany) Torsten Spittler

No.	Pos.	Player	Date of birth (age)	Caps	Goals	Club
	GK	Upendra Man Singh	27 July 1973 (aged 25)			(India) Salgacoar
	DF	Dev Narayan Chaudhary	13 February 1972 (aged 27)			Nepal Police
	DF	Sandesh Shrestha	10 October 1979 (aged 19)			(Nepal) Manang Marshyangdi Club
	DF	Rakesh Shrestha	14 January 1977 (aged 22)			Nepal Police
	MF	Naresh Joshi	13 December 1979 (aged 19)			(Nepal) Ranipokhari Corner Team
	MF	Bahadur Amatya Deepak				(Nepal)
	MF	Kumar Thapa	18 August 1981 (aged 17)			(Nepal) Manang Marshyangdi Club
	MF	Deepak Lama	9 September 1983 (aged 15)			(Nepal) Manang Marshyangdi Club
	FW	Sukra Man Tamang	25 December 1976 (aged 22)			(Nepal) Friends Club
	FW	Ramesh Budhathoki	11 April 1978 (aged 21)			(Nepal) Three Star Club
	FW	Hari Khadka	26 November 1976 (aged 22)			(Bangladesh) Muktijoddha Sangsad
	FW	Basanta Thapa	10 April 1977 (aged 22)			(Nepal) Manang Marshyangdi Club
	FW	Bal Gopal Maharjan	28 August 1975 (aged 23)			(Bangladesh) Muktijoddha Sangsad
		Deepak Ranamagar	20 March 1976 (aged 23)			(Nepal)
