= Maldives national football team results =

The Maldives national football team has represented the Maldives in international football since 1979. Their first match came against Seychelles at the 1979 Indian Ocean Island Games. The team has never qualified for a major international tournament.

== Results ==
=== 1979 ===
27 August 1979 1979 Indian Ocean Island Games	Seychelles	9–0	Maldives	Saint-Pierre, Réunion
		Report		Stadium: Stade Michel Volnay

28 August 1979 1979 Indian Ocean Island Games	Réunion	9–0	Maldives	Saint-Pierre, Réunion
		Report		Stadium: Stade Michel Volnay

29 August 1979 1979 Indian Ocean Island Games	Comoros	2–1	Maldives	Saint-Pierre, Réunion
		Report	Abdulla Rasheed	Stadium: Stade Michel Volnay

=== 1983 ===
November 1983 Friendly	Maldives	0–2	Sri Lanka	Malé, Maldives

=== 1984 ===
18 September 1984 1984 South Asian Games	Nepal	4–0	Maldives	Kathmandu, Nepal
	Thapa; Krishna; Sharma	Report		Stadium: Dasharath Stadium

19 September 1984 1984 South Asian Games	Bangladesh	5–0	Maldives	Kathmandu, Nepal
	Chunnu 2', 72'; Aslam 18', 85'; Emily 36'	Report		Stadium: Dasharath Stadium

21 September 1984 1984 South Asian Games	Maldives	1–0	Bhutan	Kathmandu, Nepal
		Report		Stadium: Dasharath Stadium

30 September 1984 Friendly	Sri Lanka	5–0	Maldives	Colombo, Maldives
		Report

=== 1985 ===
29 August 1985 1985 Indian Ocean Island Games	Comoros	2–2	Maldives	Mauritius
		Report

30 August 1985 1985 Indian Ocean Island Games	Réunion	9–0	Maldives	Mauritius
		Report

22 December 1985 1985 South Asian Games	Pakistan	3–1	Maldives	Dhaka, Bangladesh
	Agha Saeed 18', 44'; Shaukat 39'	Report	Moosa 48'	Stadium: Dhaka Stadium

23 December 1985 1985 South Asian Games	Bangladesh	8–0	Maldives	Dhaka, Bangladesh
	Elias 22'; Aslam 30', 78'; Kaiser 35', 75'; Wasim 53', 60'; Mahfuzul 55'	Report		Stadium: Dhaka Stadium; Referee: Roshan Kumar Shrestha (Nepal)

=== 1987 ===
22 November 1987 1987 South Asian Games	Pakistan	1–0	Maldives	Calcutta, India
	Sharafat	Report		Stadium: Salt Lake Stadium

23 November 1987 1987 South Asian Games	India	5–0	Maldives	Calcutta, India
	Shareef (o.g.); Sisir; Amit Bhadra; Deepak Kumar; Krishanu	Report		Stadium: Salt Lake Stadium

=== 1989 ===
20 October 1989 1989 South Asian Games	Maldives	0–0	Nepal	Islamabad, Pakistan
		Report		Stadium: Jinnah Sports Stadium

24 October 1989 1989 South Asian Games	Pakistan	2–0	Maldives	Islamabad, Pakistan
	Ashfaq 38'; Sharafat 54'	Report		Stadium: Jinnah Sports Stadium

=== 1991 ===
24 December 1991 1991 South Asian Games	Maldives	1–0	Nepal	Colombo, Sri Lanka
	Ismail Asif 30'	Report		Stadium: Sugathadasa Stadium

26 December 1991 1991 South Asian Games	Maldives	1–0	Sri Lanka	Colombo, Sri Lanka
	M. Kafeem 75'	Report		Stadium: Sugathadasa Stadium

29 December 1991 1991 South Asian Games	Maldives	0–2	Pakistan	Colombo, Sri Lanka
		Report	Ashfaq 83'; Nauman 87'	Stadium: Sugathadasa Stadium

=== 1993 ===
20 December 1993 1993 South Asian Games	Maldives	0–0	Bangladesh	Dhaka, Bangladesh
		Report		Stadium: Mirpur Stadium

24 December 1993 1993 South Asian Games	Maldives	0–0	Nepal	Dhaka, Bangladesh
		Report		Stadium: Mirpur Stadium

26 December 1993 1993 South Asian Games	Maldives	1–3	Sri Lanka	Dhaka, Bangladesh
	Mohammed Ismail	Report	Chaminda Steinwall; Anton Silva; N/A	Stadium: Mirpur Stadium

=== 1995 ===
19 December 1995 1995 South Asian Games	Nepal	1–0	Maldives	Madras, India
		Report		Stadium: Jawaharlal Nehru Stadium

21 December 1995 1995 South Asian Games	Bangladesh	0–0	Maldives	Madras, India
		Report		Stadium: Jawaharlal Nehru Stadium

=== 1996 ===
27 June 1996 1996 AFC Asian Cup qualification	Thailand	8–0	Maldives	Bangkok, Thailand
		Report

29 June 1996 1996 AFC Asian Cup qualification	Singapore	2–0	Maldives	Bangkok, Thailand
		Report

1 July 1996 1996 AFC Asian Cup qualification	Myanmar	3–1	Maldives	Bangkok, Thailand
	Myo Hlaing Win	Report

4 July 1996 1996 AFC Asian Cup qualification	Maldives	0–8	Thailand	Bangkok, Thailand
		Report

7 July 1996 1996 AFC Asian Cup qualification	Maldives	2–5	Singapore	Bangkok, Thailand
		Report

9 July 1996 1996 AFC Asian Cup qualification	Maldives	1–4	Myanmar	Bangkok, Thailand
		Report	Myo Hlaing Win

=== 1997 ===
2 June 1997 1998 FIFA World Cup qualification	Maldives	0–17	Iran	Damascus, Syria
		Report	Bagheri 9', 13', 16', 60', 66', 67', 86'; Estili 29', 47', 55'; Azizi 35', 36'; Shahroudi 56'; Mahdavikia 63'; Daei 75', 77'; Minavand 87'	Stadium: Abbasiyyin Stadium; Attendance: 7,000; Referee: An Bong-Ki (South Korea)

4 June 1997 1998 FIFA World Cup qualification	Maldives	0–12	Syria	Damascus, Syria
		Report	Al-Said 7', 13'; Jokhadar 9', 37', 89'; Rifai 10'; Jabban 12', 78'; Srour 21'; Zaher 49'; Boshi 70', 79'	Stadium: Abbasiyyin Stadium; Attendance: 15,000; Referee: Esa Mohamed Saleh (United Arab Emirates)

6 June 1997 1998 FIFA World Cup qualification	Maldives	0–3	Kyrgyzstan	Damascus, Syria
		Report	Korzanov 4'; Merzlikin 24'; Yusupov 28'	Stadium: Abbasiyyin Stadium; Attendance: 7,000; Referee: Wang Xuezhi (China)

9 June 1997 1998 FIFA World Cup qualification	Maldives	0–12	Syria	Tehran, Iran
		Report	Agha 24', 50'; Dib 55'; Taleb 60'; Al-Said 62', 63', 87'; Rihawi 66'; Abrash 80', 90'; Zaher 85', 89'	Stadium: Azadi Stadium; Attendance: 25,000; Referee: Mohamed Nazri Abdullah (Malaysia)

11 June 1997 1998 FIFA World Cup qualification	Maldives	0–9	Iran	Tehran, Iran
		Report	Mansourian 15', 44'; Bagheri 22', 39'; Daei 33', 43'; Mahdavikia 38'; Shahroudi 68'; Azizi 87'	Stadium: Azadi Stadium; Attendance: 30,000; Referee: Mohamed Sanhoub (Yemen)

13 June 1997 1998 FIFA World Cup qualification	Maldives	0–6	Kyrgyzstan	Tehran, Iran
		Report	Merzlikin 14'; Chertkov 22'; Kutsov 26'; Haitbaev 47', 89'; Ivanov 47'	Stadium: Azadi Stadium; Attendance: 70,000; Referee: Fahed Al-Damisi (Jordan)

5 September 1997 1997 SAFF Gold Cup	Maldives	1–1	Bangladesh	Kathmandu, Nepal
	Saeed	Report	Nakib 53'	Stadium: Dasarath Rangasala Stadium

9 September 1997 1997 SAFF Gold Cup	Maldives	2–2	India	Kathmandu, Nepal
	Rasheed 65'; Nizam 83'	Report	Bhutia 30'; Ancheri 55'	Stadium: Dasarath Rangasala Stadium

10 September 1997 1997 SAFF Gold Cup	Maldives	2–1	Sri Lanka	Kathmandu, Nepal
	Ismail 19'; Nizam 89'	Report	Kabeer 21'	Stadium: Dasarath Rangasala Stadium

10 September 1997 1997 SAFF Gold Cup	Maldives	1–5	India	Kathmandu, Nepal
	Lateef 43'	Report	Ancheri 9'; Bhutia 15'; Vijayan 20', 53'; Das 49'	Stadium: Dasarath Rangasala Stadium

=== 1998 ===
15 November 1998 Bristol Freedom Cup	Maldives	2–2	Sri Lanka	Colombo, Sri Lanka
		Report

1 December 1998 1998 Asian Games	Maldives	0–3	Tajikistan	Suphan Buri, Thailand
		Report	Muminov 21'; Berdikulov 65'; Saltsman 69'	Stadium: Suphan Buri Stadium

5 December 1998 1998 Asian Games	Maldives	0–4	Qatar	Suphan Buri, Thailand
		Report	Al-Kuwari 21', 41', 61', 68'	Stadium: Suphan Buri Stadium

=== 1999 ===
23 April 1999 1999 SAFF Gold Cup	Maldives	0–0	Sri Lanka	Margao, India
		Report		Stadium: Fatorda Stadium

27 April 1999 1999 SAFF Gold Cup	Maldives	3–2	Nepal	Margao, India
	Ismail 1'; Wildhan 74'; Mausoom 85'	Report	Khadka 65', 90'	Stadium: Fatorda Stadium

29 April 1999 1999 SAFF Gold Cup	Maldives	1–2	India	Margao, India
	Wildhan 43'	Report	Bhutia 30'; Coutinho 84'	Stadium: Fatorda Stadium

1 May 1999 1999 SAFF Gold Cup	Maldives	2–0	Nepal	Margao, India
	Wildhan 60'; Mohamed Ibrahim 85'	Report		Stadium: Fatorda Stadium

24 September 1999 1999 South Asian Games	Maldives	4–0	Sri Lanka	Kathmandu, Nepal
	Ibrahim 24'; Latheef 47'; Shahin 52'; Abdullah 89'	Report		Stadium: Dasarath Rangasala Stadium

27 September 1999 1999 South Asian Games	Maldives	2–1	Bangladesh	Kathmandu, Nepal
	Shiham 75'; Mizam 86'	Report	Jewel 90'	Stadium: Dasarath Rangasala Stadium

2 October 1999 1999 South Asian Games	Maldives	1–2	Nepal	Kathmandu, Nepal
	A. Ghafoor 42'	Report	Joshi 11'; Khadka 15'	Stadium: Dasarath Rangasala Stadium

4 October 1999 1999 South Asian Games	Maldives	1–3	India	Kathmandu, Nepal
	A. Ghafoor 9'	Report	Vijayan 17'; Pasha 86'; R. Vijayan 89'	Stadium: Dasarath Rangasala Stadium

=== 2000 ===
15 February 2000 Friendly	Malaysia	2–0	Maldives	Malaysia
		Report

17 February 2000 Friendly	Malaysia	3–0	Maldives	Malaysia
		Report

31 March 2000 2000 AC Q	Maldives	0–8	Iran	Aleppo, Syria
15:30		Report	Hasheminasab 19'; Dinmohammadi 20'; Mahdavikia 23'; Estili 33'; Daei 39', 61', 73'; Mousavi 79'	Stadium: Al-Hamadaniah Stadium; Attendance: 7,000; Referee: Nabil Ayad (Lebanon)

2 April 2000 2000 AC Q	Bahrain	4–1	Maldives	Aleppo, Syria
		Report		Stadium: Al-Hamadaniah Stadium

4 April 2000 2000 AC Q	Syria	6–0	Maldives	Aleppo, Syria
	Abaza 10'; Azzam 12'; Srour 30'; Al-Basha 50'; Hamami 70'; A. John 92' (o.g.)	Report		Stadium: Al-Hamadaniah Stadium

7 April 2000 2000 AC Q	Maldives	1–2	Syria	Tehran, Iran
	Latheef 90'	Report	Al Zaher 10'; Kordieh 33'	Stadium: Azadi Stadium

9 April 2000 2000 AC Q	Maldives	0–1	Bahrain	Tehran, Iran
		Report	Wahab 47'	Stadium: Azadi Stadium

11 April 2000 2000 AC Q	Iran	3–0	Maldives	Tehran, Iran
16:30	Abolghasempour 3'; Estili 32'; Daei 63' (pen.)	Report		Stadium: Azadi Stadium; Attendance: 35,000; Referee: Shamsul Maidin (Singapore)

1 May 2000 Golden Jubilee Invitational Tournament	Maldives	1–1	Sri Lanka	Malé, Maldives
		Report		Stadium: National Football Stadium

4 May 2000 Golden Jubilee Invitational Tournament	Maldives	1–1	Bangladesh	Malé, Maldives
		Report		Stadium: National Football Stadium

8 May 2000 Golden Jubilee Invitational Tournament	Maldives	1–0	India	Malé, Maldives
		Report		Stadium: National Football Stadium

10 May 2000 Golden Jubilee Invitational Tournament	Maldives	1–1 (5–6 p)	Sri Lanka	Malé, Maldives
		Report		Stadium: National Football Stadium

=== 2001 ===
25 February 2001 Friendly	Oman	5–0	Maldives	Oman
		Report

27 February 2001 Friendly	Oman	2–0	Maldives	Oman
		Report

1 April 2001 2002 FWC Q	Maldives	6–0	Cambodia	Malé, Maldives
		Report

8 April 2001 2002 FWC Q	Indonesia	5–0	Maldives	Jakarta, Indonesia
		Report

15 April 2001 2002 FWC Q	Cambodia	1–1	Maldives	Phnom Penh, Cambodia
		Report

22 April 2001 2002 FWC Q	China	10–1	Maldives	Xi'an, China
		Report

28 April 2001 2002 FWC Q	Maldives	0–1	China	Malé, Maldives
		Report

6 May 2001 2002 FWC Q	Maldives	0–2	Indonesia	Malé, Maldives
		Report

=== 2002 ===
4 April 2002 Friendly	Sri Lanka	1–0	Maldives	Sri Lanka
		Report

6 April 2002 Friendly	Sri Lanka	1–1	Maldives	Sri Lanka
		Report

9 April 2002 Friendly	Singapore	2–0	Maldives	Singapore
		Report

=== 2003 ===
11 January 2003 2003 SAFF Gold Cup	Maldives	6–0	Bhutan	Dhaka, Bangladesh
	Nizam 2'; Luffy 11'; Shiham 24', 25', 67'; Umar 77'	Report		Stadium: Bangabandhu Stadium; Referee: AD Silva (Sri Lanka)

13 January 2003 2003 SAFF Gold Cup	Maldives	0–1	Bangladesh	Dhaka, Bangladesh
		Report	Joy 90'	Stadium: Bangabandhu Stadium; Attendance: 20,000; Referee: AD Silva (Sri Lanka)

15 January 2003 2003 SAFF Gold Cup	Maldives	3–2	Nepal	Dhaka, Bangladesh
	Nizam 63'; Lutfy 75'; Umar 85'	Report	Rayamajhi 56'; Chaudhary 90' (pen.)	Stadium: Bangabandhu Stadium; Attendance: 15,000; Referee: Kunsuta Chaiwat (Thailand)

18 January 2003 2003 SAFF Gold Cup	Maldives	1–0	Pakistan	Dhaka, Bangladesh
	Fazeel 12'	Report		Stadium: Bangabandhu Stadium; Referee: Budhi Bahadur Gurung (Nepal)

20 January 2003 2003 SAFF Gold Cup	Maldives	1–1 (a.e.t.) (3–5 p)	Bangladesh	Dhaka, Bangladesh
	Umar 57'	Report	Kanchan 13'	Stadium: Bangabandhu Stadium; Attendance: 46,000; Referee: AD Silva (Sri Lanka)
	Penalties
	(penalty scored) Naaz; (penalty missed) Lutfy; (penalty scored) Naseem; (penalty scored) Fazeel		Nazrul (penalty scored); Farhad (penalty scored); Al-Mamun (penalty scored); Hasan (penalty scored); Sujan (penalty scored)

4 March 2003 Friendly	Singapore	4–1	Maldives	Singapore
		Report

21 March 2003 2004 AC Q	Brunei	1–1	Maldives	Malé, Maldives
		Report

25 March 2003 2004 AC Q	Maldives	0–2	Myanmar	Malé, Maldives
		Report

29 November 2003 2006 FIFA World Cup qualification	Mongolia	0–1	Maldives	Ulan Bator, Mongolia
		Report	Nizam 24'	Stadium: National Sports Stadium; Attendance: 2,000; Referee: Yang Zhiqiang (China PR)

3 December 2003 2006 FIFA World Cup qualification	Maldives	12–0	Mongolia	Malé, Maldives
	Ashfaq 4', 61', 63', 68'; Nizam 42'; Fazeel 45+1', 45+4'; Ghani 65'; Thoriq 74', 78'; Battulga 75' (o.g.); Nazeeh 80'	Report		Stadium: Rasmee Dhandu Stadium; Attendance: 9,000; Referee: Deshapryia Arambekade (Sri Lanka)

=== 2004 ===
18 February 2004 2006 FWC Q	Vietnam	4–0	Maldives	Hanoi, Vietnam
		Report

31 March 2004 2006 FWC Q	Maldives	0–0	South Korea	Malé, Maldives
		Report

31 May 2004 Friendly	Oman	3–0	Maldives	Oman
		Report

3 June 2004 Friendly	Oman	4–1	Maldives	Oman
		Report

9 June 2004 2006 FWC Q	Lebanon	3–0	Maldives	Beirut, Lebanon
		Report

31 August 2004 Friendly	Maldives	0–1	Oman	Malé, Maldives
		Report

3 September 2004 Friendly	Maldives	1–2	Oman	Malé, Maldives
		Report

8 September 2004 2006 FWC Q	Maldives	2–5	Lebanon	Malé, Maldives
		Report

13 October 2004 2006 FWC Q	Maldives	3–0	Vietnam	Malé, Maldives
		Report

17 November 2004 2006 FWC Q	South Korea	2–0	Maldives	Seoul, South Korea
		Report

18 December 2004 Friendly	Maldives	0–0	Sri Lanka	Malé, Maldives
		Report

=== 2005 ===
7 December 2005 2005 SAFF	Maldives	9–1	Afghanistan	Karachi, Pakistan
		Report		Stadium: Peoples Football Stadium

9 December 2005 2005 SAFF	Maldives	2–0	Sri Lanka	Karachi, Pakistan
		Report		Stadium: Peoples Football Stadium

11 December 2005 2005 SAFF	Pakistan	0–0	Maldives	Karachi, Pakistan
		Report		Stadium: Peoples Football Stadium

14 December 2005 2005 SAFF	Maldives	0–1	India	Karachi, Pakistan
		Report	Manju 38'	Stadium: Peoples Football Stadium

=== 2007 ===
2 October 2007 Friendly	Oman	1–0	Maldives	Oman
		Report

8 October 2007 2010 FWC Q	Yemen	3–0	Maldives	Sana'a, Yemen
21:00 UTC+3	Salem 44'; Al-Hubaishi 66'; Thabit 80'	Report		Stadium: Ali Mohsen Al-Muraisi Stadium; Attendance: 3,000; Referee: Mohammad Mansour (Lebanon)

28 October 2007 2010 FWC Q	Maldives	2–0	Yemen	Malé, Maldives
16:00 UTC+5	Qasim 14'; Ashfaq 67'	Report		Stadium: Rasmee Dhandu Stadium; Attendance: 8,900; Referee: Subrata Sarkar (India)

=== 2008 ===
9 April 2008 2011 AC Q	Lebanon	4–0	Maldives	Beirut, Lebanon
18:00 UTC+3	El Ali 5'; Yaacoub 11'; Atwi 13' (pen.); Ghaddar 39'	Report		Stadium: Camille Chamoun Sports City Stadium; Attendance: 200; Referee: Naser Al-Ghafary (Jordan)

23 April 2008 2011 AC Q	Maldives	1–2	Lebanon	Malé, Maldives
16:00 UTC+5	Shamweel Qasim 22'	Report	Korhani 9'; Al Jamal 75'	Stadium: Rasmee Dhandu Stadium; Attendance: 6,000; Referee: Rosdi Shahrul (Malaysia)

3 June 2008 2008 SAFF	Maldives	3–0	Pakistan	Malé, Maldives
		Report		Stadium: Rasmee Dhandu Stadium

5 June 2008 2008 SAFF	Maldives	4–1	Nepal	Malé, Maldives
		Report		Stadium: Rasmee Dhandu Stadium

7 June 2008 2008 SAFF	Maldives	0–1	India	Malé, Maldives
		Report		Stadium: Rasmee Dhandu Stadium

11 June 2008 2008 SAFF	Sri Lanka	0–1	Maldives	Colombo, Sri Lanka
		Report		Stadium: Sugathadasa Stadium

13 June 2008 2008 SAFF	India	0–1	Maldives	Colombo, Sri Lanka
		Report		Stadium: Sugathadasa Stadium

=== 2009 ===
28 March 2009 Friendly	Sri Lanka	1–1	Maldives	Sri Lanka
		Report

14 April 2009 2010 ACC Q	Turkmenistan	3–1	Maldives	Malé, Maldives
16:00	Nasyrow 42'; Şamyradow 49'; Mirzoýew 68' (pen.)	Report	Fazeel 61' (pen.)	Stadium: Rasmee Dhandu Stadium; Attendance: 9,000; Referee: Naser Al-Ghafary (Jordan)

16 April 2009 2010 ACC Q	Maldives	3–2	Philippines	Malé, Maldives
16:00	Fazeel 26' (pen.); Ashfaq 45'; Naseer 82'	Report	Borromeo 11'; Gould 90+2'	Stadium: Rasmee Dhandu Stadium; Attendance: 9,000; Referee: Alireza Faghani (Iran)

18 April 2009 2010 ACC Q	Bhutan	0–5	Maldives	Malé, Maldives
21:00		Report	Ashfaq 4', 36'; Fazeel 45+1' (pen.), 47'; Umair 80'	Stadium: Rasmee Dhandu Stadium; Attendance: 9,000; Referee: Kadhum Auda (Iraq)

26 November 2009 Friendly	Malaysia	0–1	Maldives	Malaysia
		Report

5 December 2009 2009 SAFF	Maldives	1–1	Nepal	Dhaka, Bangladesh
16:00		Report		Stadium: Bangabandhu National Stadium

7 December 2009 2009 SAFF	Maldives	3–1	Afghanistan	Dhaka, Bangladesh
16:00		Report		Stadium: Bangabandhu National Stadium

9 December 2009 2009 SAFF	Maldives	2–0	India	Dhaka, Bangladesh
18:00		Report		Stadium: Bangabandhu National Stadium

11 December 2009 2009 SAFF	Maldives	5–1	Sri Lanka	Dhaka, Bangladesh
16:00		Report		Stadium: Bangabandhu National Stadium

13 December 2009 2009 SAFF	Maldives	0–0 (a.e.t.) (1–3 p)	India	Dhaka, Bangladesh
19:00		Report		Stadium: Bangabandhu National Stadium
	Penalties
	Fazeel (penalty scored); Thariq (penalty missed); Mukhthar (penalty missed); Ashfaq (penalty missed)		(penalty scored) Jibon; (penalty scored) Denzil; (penalty missed) Nirmal; (penalty scored) Subodh

=== 2010 ===
12 October 2010 Friendly	Indonesia	3–0	Maldives	Bandung, Indonesia
15:30 UTC+7	Okto 30'; Yongki 74'; Tony 90'	Report		Stadium: Siliwangi Stadium; Attendance: 13,000; Referee: Pandian Palaniyandi (Singapore)

=== 2011 ===
21 March 2011 2012 ACC Q	Maldives	4–0	Cambodia	Malé, Maldives
21:00	Naseer 2'; Ashfaq 41', 84', 88'	Report		Stadium: Rasmee Dhandu Stadium; Attendance: 8,000; Referee: Zhao Liang (China)

23 March 2011 2012 ACC Q	Kyrgyzstan	1–2	Maldives	Malé, Maldives
16:00	Abdul Ghani 87' (o.g.)	Report	Ali 5'; Qasim 79'	Stadium: Rasmee Dhandu Stadium; Attendance: 9,000; Referee: Marai Al Awaji (Saudi Arabia)

25 March 2011 2012 ACC Q	Tajikistan	0–0	Maldives	Malé, Maldives
16:00		Report		Stadium: Rasmee Dhandu Stadium; Attendance: 9,000; Referee: Mohammed Mohamed (United Arab Emirates)

7 June 2011 Friendly	Singapore	4–0	Maldives	Singapore
		Report

10 June 2011 Friendly	Maldives	1–1	India	Malé, Maldives
		Report

23 July 2011 2014 FWC Q	Iran	4–0	Maldives	Tehran, Iran
19:30 UTC+04:30	Ansarifard 4', 62'; Karimi 67'; Daghighi 86'	Report		Stadium: Azadi Stadium; Attendance: 20,195; Referee: Chaiya Mahapab (Thailand)

28 July 2011 2014 FWC Q	Maldives	0–1	Iran	Malé, Maldives
21:00 UTC+5		Report	Khalatbari 45+1'	Stadium: Rasmee Dhandu Stadium; Attendance: 9,000; Referee: Kim Sang-Woo (Korea Republic)

4 August 2011 2011 Indian Ocean Island Games	Maldives	1–1	Mauritius	Praslin, Seychelles
		Report		Stadium: Stade d’Amitié; Attendance: 1,800

6 August 2011 2011 Indian Ocean Island Games	Comoros	2–2	Mauritius	Mahé, Seychelles
		Report		Stadium: Stade Linité; Attendance: 1,000

9 August 2011 2011 Indian Ocean Island Games	Seychelles	5–1	Maldives	Mahé, Seychelles
		Report		Stadium: Stade Linité; Attendance: 5,500

22 November 2011 Friendly	Maldives	3–0	Seychelles	Malé, Maldives
		Report

24 November 2011 Friendly	Maldives	2–1	Seychelles	Malé, Maldives
		Report

2 December 2011 2011 SAFF	Maldives	1–1	Nepal	New Delhi, India
18:00	Ashfaq 45+2'	Report	Sandip 51'	Stadium: Jawaharlal Nehru Stadium; Referee: Sukhbir Singh (Singapore)

4 December 2011 2011 SAFF	Pakistan	0–0	Maldives	New Delhi, India
18:00		Report		Stadium: Jawaharlal Nehru Stadium; Referee: Nivon Robesh Gamini (Sri Lanka)

6 December 2011 2011 SAFF	Maldives	3–1	Bangladesh	New Delhi, India
18:00	Thariq 6', 17'; Ashfaq 70'	Report	Shahed 29'	Stadium: Jawaharlal Nehru Stadium; Referee: Masoud Tufayelieh (Syria)

9 December 2011 2011 SAFF	Maldives	1–3	India	New Delhi, India
15:00	Shamweel 60'	Report	Nabi 24'; Chhetri 70' (pen.), 90+1'	Stadium: Jawaharlal Nehru Stadium; Referee: Timur Faizullin (Kyrgyzstan)

=== 2012 ===
24 February 2012 Friendly	Thailand	3–0	Maldives	Chiang Mai, Thailand
	Chatree 31'; Teerasil 53'; Datsakorn 72'	Report		Stadium: 700th Anniversary Stadium

8 March 2012 2012 ACC	Turkmenistan	3–1	Maldives	Kathmandu, Nepal
15:00	Mingazow 33'; Çoňkaýew 78'; Amanow 85'	Report	Adhuham 20'	Stadium: Halchowk Stadium; Attendance: 1,000; Referee: Yousef Al-Marzouq (Kuwait)

10 March 2012 2012 ACC	Maldives	1–0	Nepal	Kathmandu, Nepal
17:00	Rasheed 51'	Report		Stadium: Dasarath Rangasala Stadium; Attendance: 15,000; Referee: Dmitriy Mashentsev (Kyrygyzstan)

12 March 2012 2012 ACC	Maldives	0–2	Palestine	Kathmandu, Nepal
15:00		Report	Wadi 59'; Nu'man 90+4'	Stadium: Halchowk Stadium; Attendance: 300; Referee: Dmitriy Mashentsev (Kyrygyzstan)

23 August 2012 2012 Nehru Cup	Maldives	2–1	Nepal	Delhi, India
		Report

25 August 2012 2012 Nehru Cup	India	3–0	Maldives	Delhi, India
		Report

27 August 2012 2012 Nehru Cup	Maldives	2–1	Syria	Delhi, India
		Report

=== 2013 ===
12 February 2013 Friendly	Maldives	1–1	Pakistan	Malé, Maldives
21:00 UTC+05:00	Abdulla 48'	Report	Hameed 90+4'	Stadium: Rasmee Dhandu Stadium

14 February 2013 Friendly	Maldives	3–0	Pakistan	Malé, Maldives
21:00 UTC+05:00	Umair 59'; Ashfaq 67', 90+1'	Report		Stadium: Rasmee Dhandu Stadium

2 September 2013 2013 SAFF	Maldives	10–0	Sri Lanka	Kathmandu, Nepal
18:30	Abdulla 5'; Ashfaq 21' (pen.), 45+1' (pen.), 51', 53', 58', 87'; Adhuham 76'; Fasir 83'; Umar 86'	Report		Stadium: Dasarath Rangasala Stadium; Referee: Pratap Singh (India)

4 September 2013 2013 SAFF	Bhutan	2–8	Maldives	Kathmandu, Nepal
18:30	P. Tshering 25'; C. Gyeltshen 35'	Report	Fasir 16', 69'; Umair 45+3'; Ashfaq 48', 51', 76', 79'; Umar 82'	Stadium: Dasarath Rangasala Stadium; Referee: Tayeb Shamsuzzaman (Bangladesh)

6 September 2013 2013 SAFF	Afghanistan	0–0	Maldives	Kathmandu, Nepal
15:30		Report		Stadium: Dasarath Rangasala Stadium; Referee: Tayeb Shamsuzzaman (Bangladesh)

9 September 2013 2013 SAFF	Maldives	0–1	India	Kathmandu, Nepal
18:30		Report	Mondal 86'	Stadium: Dasarath Rangasala Stadium; Referee: Adham Makhadmeh (Jordan)

27 November 2013 Friendly	Seychelles	3–1	Maldives	Seychelles
		Report

29 November 2013 Friendly	Seychelles	2–1	Maldives	Seychelles
		Report

=== 2014 ===
13 May 2014 Friendly	Maldives	7–1	Laos	Malé, Maldives
16:00	Fasir 10', 83'; Niyaz 49'; Ashfaq 62' (pen.), 65'; Qasim 75'; Adhuham 82'	Report	Sihavong 50'	Stadium: National Football Stadium

19 May 2014 2014 AFC Challenge Cup	Maldives	2–3	Myanmar	Malé, Maldives
21:00	Umair 55'; Ashfaq 90+6'	Report	Kyaw Ko Ko 39', 90+5'; Nyein Chan Aung 45+1'	Stadium: National Football Stadium; Attendance: 8,300; Referee: Abdullah Balideh (Qatar)

21 May 2014 2014 AFC Challenge Cup	Kyrgyzstan	0–2	Maldives	Malé, Maldives
21:00		Report	Ashfaq 61', 71'	Stadium: National Football Stadium; Attendance: 8,000; Referee: Wang Di (China PR)

23 May 2014 2014 AFC Challenge Cup	Maldives	0–0	Palestine	Malé, Maldives
21:00		Report		Stadium: National Football Stadium; Attendance: 8,300; Referee: Yudai Yamamoto (Japan)

27 May 2014 2014 AFC Challenge Cup	Philippines	3–2 (a.e.t.)	Maldives	Malé, Maldives
21:00	P. Younghusband 19'; Lucena 38'; C. Greatwich 104'	Report	Umair 36'; Abdulla 66'	Stadium: Abdullah Balideh (Qatar); Attendance: 8,300; Referee: Abdullah Balideh (Qatar)

29 May 2014 2014 AFC Challenge Cup	Afghanistan	1–1 (a.e.t.) (7–8 p)	Maldives	Malé, Maldives
21:00	Karimi 114'	Report	Fasir 118'	Attendance: 6,500; Referee: Dmitriy Mashentsev (Kyrgyzstan)
	Penalties
	Alikhil (penalty scored); Zazai (penalty scored); Hadid (penalty missed); Karimi (penalty scored); Faqiryar (penalty scored); Sharityar (penalty scored); Daudi (penalty scored); Sakhizada (penalty scored); Shayesteh (penalty missed)		(penalty scored) Ashfaq; (penalty scored) Abdul Ghanee; (penalty missed) Fasir; (penalty scored) Rilwan; (penalty scored) Qasim; (penalty scored) Rasheed; (penalty scored) Ali; (penalty scored) Mohamed; (penalty scored) Fazeel

=== 2015 ===
26 March 2015 Friendly	Maldives	0–2	Tajikistan	Malé, Maldives
		Report

11 June 2015 2018 FWC Q	Maldives	0–1	Qatar	Malé, Maldives
		Report

16 June 2015 2018 FWC Q	Hong Kong	2–0	Maldives	Hong Kong
		Report

31 July 2015 2015 Indian Ocean Island Games	Maldives	1–3	Mayotte	Saint-Benoît, Réunion
	Umair 12'	Report	Ben Yahaya 54'; Rasolofo 83'; Noussoura 88'	Stadium: Stade Jean-Allane; Referee: (Mauritius) Dharamveer Hurbungs

2 August 2015 2015 Indian Ocean Island Games	Maldives	2–1	Seychelles	Saint-André, Réunion
	Umair 28' (pen.); Imaz 43'	Report	Esther 5'	Stadium: Stade Baby-Larivière; Referee: (Mauritius) Imtehaz Heeralall

4 August 2015 2015 Indian Ocean Island Games	Maldives	0–4	Madagascar	Saint-André, Réunion
		Report	Simouri 44', 46'; Rakotoarimalala 70'; Vombola 90'	Stadium: Stade Baby-Larivière; Referee: (Mauritius) Imtehaz Heeralall

3 September 2015 Friendly	Philippines	2–0	Maldives	Philippines
		Report

8 September 2015 2018 FWC Q	Maldives	0–3	China	Malé, Maldives
		Report

8 October 2015 2018 FWC Q	Bhutan	3–4	Maldives	Thimphu, Bhutan
		Report

13 October 2015 2018 FWC Q	Qatar	4–0	Maldives	Doha, Qatar
		Report

12 November 2015 2018 FWC Q	Maldives	0–1	Hong Kong	Malé, Maldives
		Report

24 December 2015 2015 SAFF	Maldives	3–1	Bhutan	Thiruvananthapuram, India
		Report

26 December 2015 2015 SAFF	Bangladesh	1–3	Maldives	Thiruvananthapuram, India
		Report

28 December 2015 2015 SAFF	Afghanistan	4–1	Maldives	Thiruvananthapuram, India
		Report

31 December 2015 2015 SAFF	India	3–2	Maldives	Thiruvananthapuram, India
		Report

=== 2016 ===
11 January 2016 2016 Bangabandhu Cup	Maldives	3–2	Cambodia	Jessore, Bangladesh
	Ismail Easa 6'; Naaiz Hassan 38', 79'	Report	Sun Vandeth 15'; Tith Dina 45+1'	Stadium: Shamsul Huda Stadium; Attendance: 10,000; Referee: Omar Al-Yacoubi (Oman)

19 January 2016 2016 Bangabandhu Cup	Maldives	1–4	Nepal	Dhaka, Bangladesh
	Ahmed Nashid 76'	Report	Nawayug Shrestha 31', 61', 90+2'; Bishal Rai 52'	Stadium: Bangabandhu National Stadium; Attendance: 6,000; Referee: Omar Al-Yacoubi (Oman)

24 March 2016 2018 FWC Q	China	4–0	Maldives	Wuhan, China
		Report

29 March 2016 2018 FWC Q	Maldives	4–2	Bhutan	Malé, Maldives
		Report

2 June 2016 2019 AC Q	Maldives	0–2	Yemen	Malé, Maldives
		Report

7 June 2016 2019 AC Q	Yemen	2–0	Maldives	Doha, Qatar
		Report

1 September 2016 Friendly	Maldives	5–0	Bangladesh	Malé, Maldives
		Report

6 September 2016 2019 AC Q	Maldives	4–0	Laos	Malé, Maldives
		Report

11 October 2016 2019 AC Q	Laos	1–1	Maldives	Vientiane, Laos
		Report

=== 2017 ===
28 March 2017 2019 AFC Asian Cup qualification	Maldives	0–3	Palestine	Malé, Maldives
		Report		Stadium: National Football Stadium

6 June 2017 Friendly	Maldives	1–2	Afghanistan	United Arab Emirates
		Report

13 June 2017 2019 AFC Asian Cup qualification	Bhutan	0–2	Maldives	Thimphu, Bhutan
		Report

5 September 2017 2019 AFC Asian Cup qualification	Oman	5–0	Maldives	Muscat, Oman
19:15 UTC+4	Al-Khaldi 5'; Al-Hajri 58'; Al-Yahyaei 69'; Al-Yahmadi 86'; Al-Hasani 88'	Report		Stadium: Sultan Qaboos Sports Complex; Attendance: 1,136; Referee: Võ Minh Trí (Vietnam)

10 October 2017 2019 AFC Asian Cup qualification	Maldives	1–3	Oman	Malé, Maldives
21:00 UTC+5	Fasir 24'	Report	Al-Hajri 15'; Ali 19' (o.g.); Al-Mahaijri 57'	Stadium: National Football Stadium; Attendance: 2,884; Referee: Jarred Gillett (Australia)

14 November 2017 2019 AFC Asian Cup qualification	Palestine	8–1	Maldives	Jenin, Palestine
16:00 UTC+2	Yousef 6', 33'; Faisal 16' (o.g.); Maraaba 30', 53', 54', 59'; Cantillana 56'	Report	N. Hassan 52'	Stadium: Arab American University Stadium; Attendance: 5,750; Referee: Dmitry Mashentsev (Kyrgyzstan)

=== 2018 ===
23 March 2018 Friendly	Singapore	3–2	Maldives	Singapore
		Report

27 March 2018 2019 AFC Asian Cup qualification	Maldives	7–0	Bhutan	Malé, Maldives
21:00 UTC+5	H. Mohamed 35'; N. Hassan 66', 77', 80', 82'; I. Hassan 69'; Yoosuf 90+3'	Report		Stadium: National Football Stadium; Attendance: 2,443; Referee: Hasan Akrami (Iran)

7 September 2018 2018 SAFF Championship	Maldives	0–0	Sri Lanka	Dhaka, Bangladesh
		Report

9 September 2018 2018 SAFF Championship	India	2–0	Maldives	Dhaka, Bangladesh
		Report

12 September 2018 2018 SAFF Championship	Nepal	0–3	Maldives	Dhaka, Bangladesh
		Report

15 September 2018 2018 SAFF Championship	Maldives	2–1	India	Dhaka, Bangladesh
		Report

3 November 2018 Friendly	Malaysia	3–0	Maldives	Kuala Lumpur, Malaysia
	Zaquan 16'; Safawi 81'; Sumareh 90+3'	Report		Stadium: Bukit Jalil National Stadium

=== 2019 ===
18 July 2019 2019 Indian Ocean Island Games	Maldives	0–4	Réunion	Mauritius
		Report

20 July 2019 2019 Indian Ocean Island Games	Maldives	0–3	Comoros	Mauritius
		Report

22 July 2019 2019 Indian Ocean Island Games	Maldives	1–3	Mayotte	Mauritius
		Report

5 September 2019 2022 FIFA World Cup qualification (R2)	Guam	0–1	Maldives	Dededo, Guam
15:30 UTC+10		Report (FIFA); Report (AFC)	Mahudhee 27'	Stadium: Guam F.A. National Training Center; Attendance: 714; Referee: Yaqoub Al-Hammadi (United Arab Emirates)

10 September 2019 2022 FIFA World Cup qualification (R2)	Maldives	0–5	China	Malé, Maldives
20:00 UTC+5		Report (FIFA); Report (AFC)	Wu Xi 34'; Wu Lei 45'; Yang Xu 64' (pen.); Elkeson 83' (pen.), 90+1'	Stadium: National Football Stadium; Attendance: 3,700; Referee: Turki Al-Khudhayr (Saudi Arabia)

10 October 2019 2022 FIFA World Cup qualification (R2)	Syria	2–1	Maldives	Dubai, United Arab Emirates
18:00 UTC+4	Al Somah 26', 60'	Report (FIFA); Report (AFC)		Stadium: Rashid Stadium; Attendance: 5,500; Referee: Nazmi Nasaruddin (Malaysia)

5 November 2019 Friendly (Unofficial)	Malaysia	2–1	Maldives	Paroi, Malaysia
19:00 UTC+8	Syahmi 8'; Baddrol 72'	Report	Rizuvan 60'	Stadium: Tuanku Abdul Rahman Stadium

14 November 2019 2022 FIFA World Cup qualification (R2)	Maldives	1–2	Philippines	Malé, Maldives
16:00 UTC+5	Hassan 90+3'	Report (FIFA); Report (AFC)	Ramsay 52'; Strauß 68'	Stadium: National Football Stadium; Referee: Ahmed Al-Ali (Jordan)

19 November 2019 2022 FIFA World Cup qualification (R2)	Maldives	3–1	Guam	Malé, Maldives
16:00 UTC+5	Samooh 23'; Nicklaw 38' (o.g.); Ashfaq 90+1'	Report (FIFA); Report (AFC)	Matkin 49'	Stadium: National Football Stadium; Referee: Hussein Abo Yehia (Lebanon)

=== 2021 ===
4 June 2021 2022 FIFA World Cup qualification (R2)	Maldives	0–4	Syria	Sharjah, United Arab Emirates
20:00 UTC+4		Report	Al-Mawas 29', 45+2' (pen.), 71' (pen.); Aosman 33' (pen.)	Stadium: Sharjah Stadium; Referee: Ammar Aljneibi (United Arab Emirates)

11 June 2021 2022 FIFA World Cup qualification (R2)	China	5–0	Maldives	Sharjah, United Arab Emirates
21:00 UTC+4	Liu Binbin 5'; Wu Lei 30'; Alan 68'; Zhang Yuning 69'; Tan Long 79'	Report		Stadium: Sharjah Stadium; Referee: Ahmad Al-Ali (Kuwait)

15 June 2021 2022 FIFA World Cup qualification (R2)	Philippines	1–1	Maldives	Sharjah, United Arab Emirates
18:00 UTC+4	Guirado 19'	Report	Fasir 25'	Stadium: Sharjah Stadium; Referee: Sivakorn Pu-udom (Thailand)

1 October 2021 2021 SAFF GS	Nepal	1–0	Maldives	Malé, Maldives
16:00 MVT	Dangi 86'	Report		Stadium: National Football Stadium (Maldives); Referee: Akhrol Riskullayev (Uzbekistan)

7 October 2021 2021 SAFF GS	Maldives	2–0	Bangladesh	Malé, Maldives
21:00 MVT	Mohammed 55'; Ashfaq 74'	Report		Stadium: National Football Stadium (Maldives); Referee: Yousif Saeed Hassan (Iraq)

10 October 2021 2021 SAFF GS	Maldives	1–0	Sri Lanka	Malé, Maldives
16:00 MVT	Ashfaq 6'	Report		Stadium: National Football Stadium (Maldives); Referee: Majed Al-Shamrani (Saudi Arabia)

13 October 2021 2021 SAFF GS	India	3–1	Maldives	Malé, Maldives
21:00 MVT	M. Singh 33'; Chhetri 62', 71'	Report	Ashfaq 45' (pen.)	Stadium: National Football Stadium (Maldives); Referee: Ammar Ashkanani (Kuwait)

9 November 2021 2021 Four Nations Tournament	Maldives	4–4	Sri Lanka	Colombo, Sri Lanka
16:00 SLST	A. Ghanee 8'; A. Fasir 9'; I. Mahudhee 34'; Ali Ashfaq 58'	Report	W. Razeek 64', 68', 72', 90+2'	Stadium: Racecourse Ground; Referee: Mohammed Ahmed Al-Shammari (Qatar)

13 November 2021 2021 Four Nations Tournament	Bangladesh	2–1	Maldives	Colombo, Sri Lanka
16:00 SLST	J. Bhuyan 12'; T. Barman 86' (pen.)	Report	A. Ibrahim 33'	Stadium: Racecourse Ground; Referee: Crishantha Dilan Perera (Sri Lanka)

16 November 2021 2021 Four Nations Tournament	Seychelles	0–0	Maldives	Colombo, Sri Lanka
21:00 SLST		Report		Stadium: Racecourse Ground; Referee: Nivon Robesh (Sri Lanka)

=== 2022 ===
24 March 2022 Friendly	Maldives	2–0	Bangladesh	Malé, Maldives
22:00	Raif 38'; Mahudhee 61'			Stadium: National Football Stadium

8 June 2022 2023 Asian Cup qualification	Thailand	3–0	Maldives	Namangan, Uzbekistan
17:00 UTC+5	Sarach 40'; Teerasil 45+2'; Pansa 80'	Report		Stadium: Markaziy Stadium; Attendance: 1,100; Referee: Mohammad Arafah (Jordan)

11 June 2022 2023 Asian Cup qualification	Uzbekistan	4–0	Maldives	Namangan, Uzbekistan
20:30 UTC+5	Shomurodov 2', 51', 80'; Urunov 86'	Report		Stadium: Markaziy Stadium; Attendance: 9,066; Referee: Masoud Tufaylieh (Syria)

14 June 2022 2023 Asian Cup qualification	Maldives	1–0	Sri Lanka	Namangan, Uzbekistan
17:00 UTC+5	Mohamed 63'	Report		Stadium: Markaziy Stadium; Attendance: 920; Referee: Ali Reda (Lebanon)

21 September 2022 Friendly	Brunei	0–3	Maldives	Bandar Seri Begawan, Brunei
15:00 GMT+7		Report	Waheed 35'; Mohamed 74'; Raif 90+3'	Stadium: Track & Field Sports Complex; Referee: Yudi Nurcahya (Indonesia)

24 September 2022 Friendly	Maldives	3–1	Laos	Bandar Seri Begawan, Brunei
15:00 GMT+7	Raif 11'; Waheed 60'; Nihan 68'	Report	Bounkong 43'	Stadium: Track & Field Sports Complex; Referee: Thoriq Munir Alkatiri (Indonesia)

14 December 2022 Friendly	Malaysia	3–0	Maldives	Kuala Lumpur, Malaysia
				Stadium: Kuala Lumpur Stadium

17 December 2022 Friendly	Singapore	3–1	Maldives	Jalan Besar, Singapore
	Ilhan Fandi 4' Shawal Anuar 50', 87'		Ibrahim Mahudhee 17'	Stadium: Jalan Besar Stadium

=== 2023 ===
21 March 2023 Friendly	Maldives	1–0	Pakistan	Gan, Maldives
16:00 UTC+5	Aisam 8'	Report		Stadium: Laamu Gan Zone Stadium

22 June 2023 2023 SAFF Championship	Maldives	2–0	Bhutan	Bengaluru, India
19:30 UTC+5:30	Mohamed 6' (pen.); Hassan 90'	Report		Stadium: Sree Kanteerava Stadium; Attendance: 200; Referee: Irshad Ul Haq (Pakistan)

25 June 2023 2023 SAFF Championship	Bangladesh	3–1	Maldives	Bengaluru, India
15:30 UTC+5:30	Rakib 42'; Tariq 67'; Morsalin 90'	Report	Mohamed 17'	Stadium: Sree Kanteerava Stadium; Attendance: 100; Referee: Prajwol Chhetri (Nepal)

28 June 2023 2023 SAFF Championship	Lebanon	1–0	Maldives	Bangalore, India
15:30 UTC+5:30	Maatouk 24'	Report		Stadium: Sree Kanteerava Stadium; Attendance: 50; Referee: Pema Tshewang (Bhutan)

12 October 2023 2026 FIFA World Cup qualification – AFC first round	Maldives	1–1	Bangladesh	Malé, Maldives
16:00 UTC+5	Nazeen 87'	Report	Saad 90+2'	Stadium: National Football Stadium; Attendance: 2,500; Referee: Vahid Kazemi (Iran)

17 October 2023 2026 FIFA World Cup qualification – AFC first round	Bangladesh	2–1	Maldives	Dhaka, Bangladesh
17:45 UTC+6	Rakib 11'; Fahim 46'	Report	Aisam 36'	Stadium: Bashundhara Kings Arena; Attendance: 6,729; Referee: Ammar Mahfoodh (Bahrain)

=== 2024 ===
13 November 2024 Friendly	Bangladesh	0–1	Maldives	Dhaka, Bangladesh
18:00 BST (UTC+6)		Report	Fasir 18'	Stadium: Bashundhara Kings Arena; Referee: Virendha Rai (Bhutan)

16 November 2024 Friendly	Bangladesh	2–1	Maldives	Dhaka, Bangladesh
18:00 BST (UTC+6)	Jony 43'; Papon 90+4'	Report	Fasir 23'	Stadium: Bashundhara Kings Arena; Referee: Virendha Rai (Bhutan)

=== 2025 ===
19 March 2025 Friendly	India	3–0	Maldives	Shillong, India
19:00 UTC+5:30	Bheke 34'; Colaço 66'; Chhetri 76'			Stadium: Jawaharlal Nehru Stadium; Attendance: 6,798; Referee: Prajwol Chhetri (Nepal)

25 March 2025 2027 AFC Asian Cup qualification – third round	Philippines	4–1	Maldives	Capas, Philippines
19:00 UTC+8	J. Tabinas 6'; Kristensen 19'; Schneider 77'; Reyes 90+2'	Report (AFC)	Fasir 62'	Stadium: New Clark City Stadium; Attendance: 3,334; Referee: Daniel Elder (Australia)

5 June 2025 Friendly	Singapore	3–1	Maldives	Bishan, Singapore
	A. Adli 7'; Ikhsan F. 20', 32'	Report	A. Rizuvan 90+1' (pen.)	Stadium: Bishan Stadium; Attendance: 2,297; Referee: Razlan Joffri Ali (Malaysia)

10 June 2025 2027 AFC Asian Cup qualification	Timor-Leste	1–0	Maldives	Darwin, Australia
20:00 UTC+8	J. Pedro 45+1'	Report (AFC)		Stadium: Territory Rugby League Stadium; Attendance: 1,048; Referee: Songkran Bunmeekiart (Thailand)

6 September 2025 Friendly	Sri Lanka	0–3	Maldives	Colombo, Sri Lanka
17:30 UTC+5:30		Report	Naiz Hassan 27'; Hussain 34'; Fasir 90+2'	Stadium: Colombo Racecourse; Referee: Mahmood Salim Said (Oman)

9 September 2025 Friendly	Sri Lanka	1–1	Maldives	Colombo, Sri Lanka
17:30 UTC+5:30	Kelaart 90+2'	Report	Naiz Hassan 67'	Stadium: Colombo Racecourse; Referee: Mahmood Salim Said (Oman)

9 October 2025 2027 AFC Asian Cup qualification	Tajikistan	2–0	Maldives	Hisor, Tajikistan
18:00 UTC+5	Samiev 8'; Mabatshoyev 30'	Report (AFC)		Stadium: Hisor Central Stadium; Attendance: 5,250; Referee: Zayniddin Alimov (Kyrgyzstan)

14 October 2025 2027 AFC Asian Cup qualification	Maldives	0–3	Tajikistan	Malé, Maldives
15:30 UTC+5		Report (AFC)	Safarov 4'; Mabatshoyev 34', 78'	Stadium: National Football Stadium; Attendance: 3,120; Referee: Mohanad Qasim Sarray (Iraq)

18 November 2025 2027 AFC Asian Cup qualification	Maldives	0–2	Philippines	Malé, Maldives
15:30 UTC+5		Report (AFC)	J. Tabinas 24'; S. Reyes 37'	Stadium: National Football Stadium; Attendance: 1,591; Referee: Ahmed Khalil (Bahrain)

=== 2026 ===
31 March 2026 2027 AFC Asian Cup qualification	Maldives	2–1	Timor-Leste	Malé, Maldives
15:30 UTC+5:30	Irufaan 89'; Fasir 90+4' (pen.)	Report (AFC)	Bakhito 67'	Stadium: National Football Stadium; Attendance: 500; Referee: Razlan Joffri Ali (Malaysia)

1 June 2026 Diamond Jubilee Football Tournament	Maldives	0–1	Afghanistan	Malé, Maldives
21:00 UTC+5:30		Report	Roma 79'	Stadium: National Football Stadium; Attendance: 1,028; Referee: Aditya Purkayastha (India)

4 June 2026 Diamond Jubilee Football Tournament	Maldives	0–3	Pakistan	Malé, Maldives
16:00 UTC+5:30		Report	Nawaz 53'; Arshad 84'; Hamid 87'	Stadium: National Football Stadium; Attendance: 1,050; Referee: Ashwin Kumar (India)

7 June 2026 Diamond Jubilee Football Tournament	Maldives	1–1	Bangladesh Olympic	Malé, Maldives
21:00 UTC+5:30	Fasir 14' (pen.)	Report	Mirajul 54' (pen.)	Stadium: National Football Stadium; Attendance: 2,150; Referee: Senthilnathan Sekaran (India)

24 September 2026 Friendly	China	3–0	Maldives	Chongqing, China
19:35 UTC+8	Wang Ziming 50', 56', 63'	Report		Stadium: Longxing Football Stadium; Referee: Asker Nadjafaliev

28 September 2026 Friendly	Kyrgyzstan	5–0	Maldives	Bishkek, Kyrgyzstan
20:00 UTC+6	Atabayev 11', 23'; Sirozhiddin 20'; Murzakov 32'; Kojo 42'	Report		Stadium: Dolen Omurzakov Stadium

1 October 2026 Friendly	Lebanon	6–0	Maldives	Bishkek, Kyrgyzstan
20:00 UTC+6	Chakroun 3', 36', 42'; Maish 52' (o.g.); Kassas 83', 90+2'	Report		Stadium: Dolen Omurzakov Stadium; Referee: Alimardon Baynazarov (Kyrgyzstan)

8 November 2026 2026 SAFF Championship	Maldives	0–3	Pakistan	Dhaka, Bangladesh
15:30 +6:00		SAFF; FIFA	M. Abdullah 3' (pen.); Najeeb 8', 23'	Stadium: National Stadium; Attendance: 203; Referee: Ahmad A'Qashah (Singapore)

11 November 2026 2026 SAFF Championship	Maldives	0–1	India	Dhaka, Bangladesh
15:30 +6:00		SAFF; FIFA	Suhail 38' (pen.)	Stadium: National Stadium; Attendance: 1,969; Referee: Mohammed Khalfan Al Manai (Oman)
