= Sarfraz Rasool =

Pakistani footballer

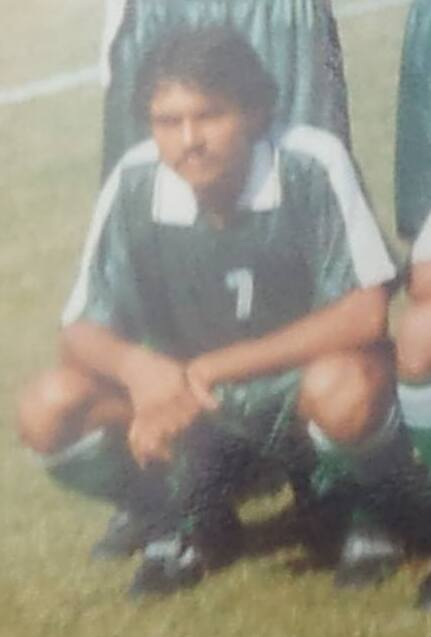
- Rasool with Pakistan at the 1997 South Asian Football Federation Gold Cup

Personal information
- Full name: Sarfraz Rasool Chaudhry
- Date of birth: 10 July 1975 (age 51)
- Place of birth: Faisalabad, Pakistan
- Height: 1.76 m (5 ft 9 in)
- Position: Attacking midfielder

Senior career*
Years	Team	Apps	(Gls)
1994–1999	Punjab Medical Center		
1999–2008	Khan Research Laboratories		
2008–2011	PMC Athletico		

International career
1997–2003	Pakistan	23	(6)
- * Club domestic league appearances and goals

Sarfraz Rasool (born 10 July 1975) is a Pakistani former footballer who played as an attacking midfielder. Rasool won the Golden Boot at 2003 SAFF Championship, where he finished as the top-scorer with 4 goals, and was named Asian Football Confederation's Player of the Month for his performance at the SAFF Cup held in March 2003.

== Early life ==
Rasool was born on 10 July 1975 in Faisalabad, in the Punjab province of Pakistan.

== Club career ==
=== PMC ===
Rasool started his career with Punjab Medical Center club in 1994.

=== Khan Research Laboratories ===
As a goal scoring midfielder, Rasool had been playing for departmental side Khan Research Laboratories from 1999 to 2003, when he was eyed by the national team. In the 1999 President PFF Cup played in Chaman, Rasool was nominated player of the tournament.

=== PMC Athletico Faisalabad ===
Rasool controversially left Pakistan soon after and moved to England, which effectively ended his international career, but remained with Khan Research Laboratories for some seasons, before eventually returning to his former club, now renamed PMC Club Athletico Faisalabad as founder member in August 2008.

== International career ==
Rasool was called by Pakistan in the 1997 South Asian Football Federation Gold Cup held in Nepal. He subsequently became a key part of the national team from 1999 to 2003. At the 1999 SAFF Gold Cup, Rasool was nominated player of tournament.

He was named as captain of the national team for the 2002 away friendly series against Sri Lanka, and when South Korean club Ulsan HD FC visited Pakistan for test matches in 2002.

Rasool won the Golden Boot during the 2003 SAFF Gold Cup by emerging as the leading goal-scorer with a total of 4 goals. Additionally, he earned the title of Asian Football Confederation Player of the Month for his outstanding performance in the SAFF Cup held in March 2003.

In March 2003, he was selected as vice-captain for the national side at the 2004 AFC Asian Cup qualification after Haroon Yousaf.

== Coaching career ==
After quitting playing and settling in England, Rasool earned the FA Level Two coaching certification, equivalent to UEFA C Licence.

In the 2011–12 Pakistan Premier League, he was nominated assistant coach of PMC Club Athletico Faisalabad under head coach Akhtar Mohiuddin.

On 26 July 2012, Rasool joined Total Football Academy FC in Loughton as youth coach of the under-9 team.

== Career statistics ==
=== International ===
Appearances and goals by national team and year
National team	Year	Apps	Goals
Pakistan	1997	2	0
Pakistan	1999	3	0
Pakistan	2000	2	0
Pakistan	2001	6	0
Pakistan	2002	3	1
Pakistan	2003	7	5
Total		23	6

Scores and results list Pakistan's goal tally first, score column indicates score after each Rasool goal.

List of international goals scored by Sarfraz Rasool
No.	Date	Venue	Opponent	Score	Result	Competition
1	25 March 2002	Kalutara Stadium, Kalautara, Sri Lanka	Sri Lanka	0–1	2–1	Friendly
2	10 January 2003	Bangabandhu National Stadium, Dhaka, Bangladesh	India	0–1	0–1	2003 South Asian Football Federation Gold Cup
3	12 January 2003	Bangabandhu National Stadium, Dhaka, Bangladesh	Sri Lanka	2–1	2–1	2003 South Asian Football Federation Gold Cup
4	14 January 2003	Bangabandhu National Stadium, Dhaka, Bangladesh	Afghanistan	1–0	1–0	2003 South Asian Football Federation Gold Cup
5	20 January 2003	Bangabandhu National Stadium, Dhaka, Bangladesh	India	1–1	2–1	2003 South Asian Football Federation Gold Cup
6	21 March 2003	Jalan Besar Stadium, Kallang, Singapore	Macau	0–2	0–3	2004 AFC Asian Cup qualification

Awards
Preceded by (Nepal) Naresh Joshi (India) Baichung Bhutia (Bangladesh) Mizanur Rahman Dawn (Maldives) Mohamed Wildhan	SAFF Cup Golden Boot; 2003	Succeeded by (Maldives) Ibrahim Fazeel (Maldives) Ali Ashfaq (Maldives) Ahmed Thariq
