= 2000 National Football League (Bangladesh) =

1st professional season of the top-flight football league in Bangladesh

National Football League
- Season: 2000
- Dates: 9 February — 6 April
- Champions: Dhaka Abahani
- Matches: 18
- Goals: 41 (2.28 per match)
- Best Player: Tanvir Chowdhury
- Top goalscorer: 3 goals (Bangladesh) Saifur Rahman Moni (Chittagong Abahani) (Bangladesh) Md Rakib Hossain (Dhaka Mohammedan) (Ghana) Kennedy (Dhaka Abahani)
- Biggest home win: Chittagong Abahani 3–0 Rajshahi Abahani (11 February 2000)
- Biggest away win: Rajshahi Abahani 1–0 Abahani KC Khulna (6 March 2000)
- Highest scoring: Muktijoddha Sangsad KC 5–1 Netorkana Mohammedan
- Longest unbeaten run: Dhaka Abahani (6 Matches)
- Longest losing run: Rajshahi Abahani; Netorkana Mohammedan (3 Matches)

The 2000 National Football League was the inaugural season of the country's first football league held on a national scale. The league was also known as the Nitol-Tata National Football League due to sponsorship reasons.

The league included the top three finishing clubs from the 1999 season of the country's top-tier football league at the time, the Dhaka Premier Division League. The clubs were the league champions Dhaka Mohammedan, runners-up Muktijoddha Sangsad KC and third-place Dhaka Abahani. Additionally, the district league champions of Chittagong (Chittagong Abahani), Khulna (Khulna Abahani), and Rajshahi (Rajshahi Abahani) were also given direct entry to the league. Chaturanga Jubo Sangha from Sylhet won a play-off against the champions of Barisal to secure their place in the league. Netrokona-based Mohammedan SC was also granted permission to enter the league.

== Summary ==
On 4 January 2000, the three Dhaka clubs: Dhaka Mohammedan, Dhaka Abahani, and Muktijoddha Sangsad KC submitted their squad lists. On 7 January, Netrokona Mohammedan SC, Chittagong Abahani, Rajshahi Abahani KC, Khulna Abahani KC and Sylhet Chaturanga Jubo Sangha announced their squads.

The first-round games were played in Chittagong, Khulna and Rajshahi. In the final round, all games were held in Dhaka.

== First round ==
=== Group 1 ===
Pos	Team	Pld	W	D	L	GF	GA	GD	Pts	Qualification
1	Chittagong Abahani	3	2	0	1	6	3	+3	6	Qualification for Final Round
2	Dhaka Mohammedan	3	2	0	1	5	2	+3	6	Qualification for Final Round
3	Khulna Abahani	3	2	0	1	3	4	−1	6	
4	Rajshahi Abahani	3	0	0	3	0	5	−5	0	

Source: rsssf.com
9 February 2000

Dhaka Mohammedan	3–0	Khulna Abahani
Munna 24'; Alfaz 59'; Dawn 76'	Report

M. A. Aziz Stadium, Chittagong
Attendance: 12,000
Referee: Ibrahim Nesar

11 February 2000

Chittagong Abahani	3–0	Rajshahi Abahani
Farhad 16', 79'; Moni 19'	Report

M. A. Aziz Stadium, Chittagong
Attendance: 15,000
Referee: Ibrahim Nesar

4 March 2000

Chittagong Abahani	1–2	Khulna Abahani
Sourav Majumder Raju 89'	Report	Hasan Imam Rikto 73', 75'

Khulna District Stadium, Khulna
Referee: Ram Krishna Ghosh

6 March 2000

Dhaka Mohammedan	1–0	Rajshahi Abahani
Rakib 22'	Report

Khulna District Stadium, Khulna
Referee: Abdur Rakib

10 March 2000

Chittagong Abahani	2–1	Dhaka Mohammedan
Moni 17'; Md Yusuf 85'	Report	Rakib 34' (pen.)

Muktijuddho Sriti Stadium, Rajshahi
Referee: Ehsanul Haque

12 March 2000

Khulna Abahani	1–0	Rajshahi Abahani
Kazi Jamal Hossain 41'	Report

Muktijuddho Sriti Stadium, Rajshahi
Referee: R Alam

=== Group 2 ===
Pos	Team	Pld	W	D	L	GF	GA	GD	Pts	Qualification
1	Dhaka Muktijoddha Sangsad	3	2	1	0	7	2	+5	7	Qualification for Final Round
2	Dhaka Abahani	3	2	1	0	8	2	+6	7	Qualification for Final Round
3	Chaturanga JS	3	1	0	2	1	4	−3	3	
4	Netorkana Mohammedan	3	0	0	3	2	10	−8	0	

Source: rsssf.com
10 February 2000

Dhaka Muktijoddha Sangsad	1–0	Chaturanga JS
Bakhtiar Uddin 76'	Report

M. A. Aziz Stadium, Chittagong
Referee: Maruf Sikdar

12 February 2000

Dhaka Abahani	4–1	Netorkana Mohammedan
Kanchan 4'; Shahajuddin Tipu 7'; Arman ?'; Kennedy 57'	Report	Saiful 67'

M. A. Aziz Stadium, Chittagong
Referee: Maruf Hossain

3 March 2000

Dhaka Abahani	1–1	Dhaka Muktijoddha Sangsad
Kennedy 20'	Report	Nakib 5'

Khulna District Stadium, Khulna
Referee: Tayeb Shamsuzzaman

5 March 2000

Chaturanga JS	1–0	Netrokona Mohammedan
Md Milan 85'	Report

Khulna District Stadium, Khulna
Referee: Shubhash Roy

11 March 2000

Dhaka Muktijoddha Sangsad	5–1	Netrokona Mohammedan
Mujibur Rahman Ritu 10'; Majedur Rahman Tushar ?'; Saiful Islam Khokon ?'; Bakhtiar Uddin ?'; Liton ?'	Report	Masud Khan Jhony 48'

Muktijuddho Sriti Stadium, Rajshahi
Referee: R Alam

13 March 2000

Dhaka Abahani	abd. (0–1) 3–0 Walkover	Chaturanga JS
	Report	Walid 25'

Muktijuddho Sriti Stadium, Rajshahi
Referee: Tajul Islam
- Note: The game was abandoned with Chaturanga leading 0–1 after their players attacked the referee following a penalty being awarded to Abahani in the 82nd minute.

== Final round ==
Pos	Team	Pld	W	D	L	GF	GA	GD	Pts
1	Dhaka Abahani (C)	6	4	2	0	10	2	+8	14
2	Dhaka Mohammedan	6	3	2	1	8	4	+4	11
3	Chittagong Abahani	6	3	1	2	10	7	+3	10
4	Dhaka Muktijoddha Sangsad	6	2	1	3	10	8	+2	7

Source: rsssf.com
(C) Champions
29 March 2000

Dhaka Mohammedan	1–1	Chittagong Abahani
Dawn 27'	Report	Moni 6'

Mirpur Stadium, Dhaka
Referee: R Alam

30 March 2000

Dhaka Abahani	1–0	Dhaka Muktijoddha Sangsad
Zakir 65'	Report

Mirpur Stadium, Dhaka
Referee: Ram Krishna Ghosh

2 April 2000

Dhaka Mohammedan	2–1	Dhaka Muktijoddha Sangsad
Andrei 18'; Rakib 66'	Report	Baretto 11'

Mirpur Stadium, Dhaka
Referee: Ibrahim Nesar

3 April 2000

Dhaka Abahani	1–0	Chittagong Abahani
Kennedy 66'	Report

Mirpur Stadium, Dhaka
Referee: Ehsanul Haque

5 April 2000

Chittagong Abahani	3–2	Dhaka Muktijoddha Sangsad
Sourav Majumder Raju ?'; Rezaul Karim Biplab ?'; Nurul Islam ?'	Report	Majedur Rahman Tushar ?'; Baretto ?'

Mirpur Stadium, Dhaka
Referee: Abdur Rakib

6 April 2000

Dhaka Abahani	0–0	Dhaka Mohammedan
	Report

Mirpur Stadium, Dhaka
Referee: Maruf Sikdar

== Individual awards ==
=== Best coach ===
- (Bangladesh) Mohammad Abu Yusuf - Chittagong Abahani

=== Best player ===
- (Bangladesh) Tanvir Chowdhury - Chittagong Abahani

=== Best club ===
- Chittagong Abahani

=== Best referee ===
- (Bangladesh) Ram Krishna Gosh
