= Maldives (disambiguation) =

The Maldives is a country located in South Asia.

Maldives may also refer to:

== Sports ==
- Maldives national football team
- Maldives women's national football team results
- Maldives national football team results
- Football Association of Maldives
- Maldives at the Olympics

== Government ==
- Maldives National Defence Force
- Maldives Inland Revenue Authority

== Entertainment ==
- Economy of Maldives
- Tourism in the Maldives
- Geography of the Maldives

=== Music ===
- The Maldives (band)
