= Ismail Shah =

Ismail Shah may refer to:

- Ismail Shah (footballer) (born 1971), Maldivian footballer
- Ismail Adil Shah (1498–1534), king of Bijapur
- Nasir-ud-din Ismail Shah or Ismail Mukh, leader of the rebellion of Ismail Mukh against the Delhi Sultanate in the Deccan region of India

== See also ==
- Shah Ismayil (disambiguation)
