= MNDF (disambiguation) =

MNDF is the national military of the Maldives.

MNDF may also refer to:

- MNDF Marine Corps
- MNDF Special Forces
- MNDF Coast Guard

== See also ==
- Maldives (disambiguation)
