= Zahid Taj =

Pakistani footballer

Personal information
- Date of birth: 3 November 1972 (age 53)
- Place of birth: Karachi, Pakistan
- Height: 1.80 m (5 ft 11 in)
- Position: Goalkeeper

Senior career*
Years	Team	Apps	(Gls)
1991–2002	National Bank		

International career
1999	Pakistan	2	(0)
- * Club domestic league appearances and goals

Zahid Taj (born 3 November 1972) is a Pakistani former footballer who played as a goalkeeper. He represented the Pakistan national team in 1999.

== Early life ==
Taj was born in Karachi on 3 November 1972.

== Club career ==
Taj started his football career as a goalkeeper with Young Chhattis B Landhi in 1988, and later joined departmental side National Bank in 1991. He also captained the team.

== International career ==
Taj was selected for the national youth team in 1994. He made his senior debut with Pakistan at the 1999 SAFF Gold Cup, and later played at the 1999 South Asian Games.

== Coaching career ==
After retirement as player, Taj obtained the AFC coaching license, and started his coaching career with youth development programs, setting up his own academy called Real Soccer. In 2009, he served as substitute head coach of National Bank in absence of Nasir Ismail. In 2012, he was appointed goalkeeping coach by the Pakistan Football Federation for the AFC U-14 Festival of Football.

In 2014 and 2015, Taj was appointed goalkeeping coach of the Pakistan national team. He again had several stints as goalkeeping coach of the national team.
