= Ali Nashid =

Maldivian professional football manager

Personal information
- Place of birth: Maldives

Managerial career
- Years: Team
- –2013: Maldives (assistant)
- 2013–2014: Maldives (caretaker)

Ali Nashid (Dhivehi: ޢަލީ ނަޝީދު), nicknamed Ogaru Ayya, is a Maldivian professional football manager.

== Career ==
In November 2013 he became the new caretaker coach of the Maldives national football team. In March 2014 has been changed by Drago Mamić.
