= Daljit Singh (footballer) =

Indian footballer

Personal information
- Full name: Daljit Singh
- Date of birth: 24 June 1976 (age 50)
- Place of birth: Hoshiarpur, Punjab, India
- Height: 1.83 m (6 ft 0 in)
- Position: Defender

Senior career*
Years	Team	Apps	(Gls)
1996–2011	JCT		
2011–2013	Mohun Bagan		
- Punjab

International career
- India
- * Club domestic league appearances and goals

Daljit Singh (born 24 June 1976) is a former Indian football player who represented JCT, Mohun Bagan clubs and the India football team.

== Honours ==
India

- SAFF Championship: 1999
- South Asian Games Bronze medal: 1999
