= Hassan Hameed =

Maldivian footballer

Dakey
Personal information
- Full name: Hassan Hameed
- Date of birth: 18 March 1980 (age 46)
- Place of birth: Malé, Maldives
- Position: Goalkeeper

Team information
- Current team: Super United Sports (goalkeeper coach)

Senior career*
| Years | Team | Apps | (Gls) |
| 1999 | New Radiant | | |
| 2000 | New Lagoons | | |
| 2001–2003 | Island Football Club | | |
| 2004 | Hinnavaru Hiriya Club | | |
| 2005–2008 | New Radiant | | |

International career
| 1996 | Maldives U16 | | |
| 1998 | Maldives U19 | | |
| 1999–2003 | Maldives U23 | | |

Managerial career
- 2009–2012: New Radiant (goalkeeper & assistant coach)
- 2011: Maldives U19 (goalkeeper coach)
- 2012–2015: Maldives women's (goalkeeper coach)
- 2012–2014: BG Sports Club (assistant coach)
- 2013–2014: BG Sports Club U21 (coach)
- 2015: New Radiant (goalkeeper coach)
- 2015: New Radiant Academy (coach)
- 2015: Maldives U23 (goalkeeper coach)
- 2015–2016: Maldives (goalkeeper coach)
- 2017–2018: New Radiant (assistant coach & goalkeeper coach)
- 2019–2020: United Victory (goalkeeper coach)
- 2020– 2022: Super United Sports (goalkeeper coach)
- * Club domestic league appearances and goals

Hassan Hameed (born 18 March 1980), commonly known as Dakey, is a Maldivian retired footballer who played as a goalkeeper. He is the goalkeeping coach for Super United Sports.

== Club career ==
Hameed first signed for New Radiant in 1999 before joining New Lagoons in the following year. He then played for Island Football Club and Hinnavaru Hiriya Club before returning to his former club New Radiant.

== Coaching career ==
Hameed joined the coaching staffs of New Radiant as a goalkeeper coach, following his retirement as a player. He spent four years at New Radiant, before handing over the job of training the goalkeepers of Maldives under 19 team and women's national team.

On 2013, he joined BG Sports Club and remained as the club's assistant coach and their under 21 team's coach for two years. He returned to where he started coaching; to New Radiant on 2015 season as a goalkeeper coach but also had to perform as a caretaker assistant coach for some part of the season. He was also the New Radiant academy coach in 2015.

After the 2015 season, he was handed over the job of the goalkeeper coach of Maldives.
