= Tanvir Chowdhury =

Bangladeshi footballer (1977–2018)

- Tanvir during his playing days

Personal information
- Full name: Mohamed Tanvir Chowdhury
- Date of birth: 25 September 1977
- Place of birth: Natore, Bangladesh
- Date of death: 9 October 2018 (aged 41)
- Place of death: Natore, Bangladesh
- Height: 1.65 m (5 ft 5 in)
- Position: Winger

Senior career*
Years	Team	Apps	(Gls)
1995–1996	Victoria SC		
1997–2001	Badda Jagoroni		
2000	→ Chittagong Abahani (loan)		
2001–2002	Dhaka Abahani		
2002–2003	Arambagh KS		
2004–2009	Sheikh Russel KC		
2005–2006	→ Muktijoddha Sangsad (loan)		
2009–2010	Brothers Union		

International career
1998	Bangladesh U16	4	(1)
2000	Bangladesh U19	3	(?)
2000	Bangladesh	3	(0)
- * Club domestic league appearances and goals

Tanvir Chowdhury (Bengali: তানভীর চৌধুরী; 25 September 1977 – 9 October 2018) was a Bangladeshi former footballer who played as a right winger.

== Club career ==
Tanvir began his career in the Dhaka First Division League with Victoria SC in 1995. Tanvir made his Premier Division League debut with Badda Jagorani in 1999. He came to the limelight during the 2000 National League with Chittagong Abahani. He won the Best Player Award and received Tk 50,000 along with a motorcycle. He received a club highest Tk 7.5 lakh salary from Sheikh Russel KC for the 2007 B.League.

== International career ==
In 1998, Tanvir represented Bangladesh at the 1998 AFC U-16 Championship. During the tournament he scored against South Korea U16 in a 1–2 defeat. In 2000, he played in the 2000 AFC Youth Championship qualifiers. On 2 May 2000, he made his debut for the Bangladesh national team as a 61st-minute substitute during a 1–1 draw with India in the Maldives Invitational Football Tournament. In the same year, he participated in a friendly match against India in London.

== Death ==
On 19 May 2015, Tanvir was caught in a bus accident while returning to Dhaka from his village in Natore. The passenger beside him died on spot, while Tanvir suffered a severe head injury and immediately lost consciousness. He was kept on life support for thirteen days, before regaining consciousness on 28 July 2015. His former teammates also arranged a press conference seeking public assistance, in June 2015. His treatment at Square Hospital lasted for three months, and eventually, he was admitted to a Paralysis Rehabilitation Center on 24 August 2015. BFF also donated Tk 2 lakhs to aid his treatment.

Tanvir died on 9 October 2018, while being treated at the Natore Sadar Hospital. The cause of dead was due to a sudden drop in his blood sugar level. He left behind his wife and two daughters.

== Honours ==
Badda Jagorani Sangsad

- Dhaka First Division League: 1997–98

Abahani Limited Dhaka

- Dhaka Premier Division League: 2001

Individual

- 2000 – National League Best Player Award.
