= Shah Ismayil =

Shah Ismayil may refer to:

- Shah Ismayil or Ismail I (1487–1524), a 16th-century Shah of Persia, founder of the Safavid Empire
  - Shah Ismayil (opera), an opera by Muslim Magomayev
  - Shah Ismail Order, an Azerbaijani military award
- Shah Ismail Dehlvi (1779–1831), 19th-century Indian Islamic scholar

== See also ==
- Ismail Shah (disambiguation)
