= Iqbal Hossain (footballer) =

Bangladeshi footballer

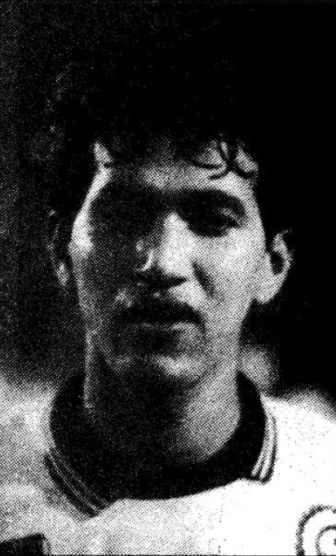
- Iqbal with Mohammedan SC in 1996

Personal information
- Full name: Mohammed Iqbal Hossain
- Date of birth: 7 July 1975 (age 51)
- Place of birth: Gazipur, Bangladesh
- Height: 1.80 m (5 ft 11 in)
- Position: Midfielder

Senior career*
Years	Team	Apps	(Gls)
1993–1994	Agrani Bank		
1995–1996	Dhaka Abahani		
1996–1997	Mohammedan		
1997–1998	Muktijoddha		
1999–2003	Dhaka Abahani		
2003–2004	Brothers Union		
2005–2006	Muktijoddha		

International career
1994	Bangladesh U16		
1996	Bangladesh U19		
1997–2001	Bangladesh		
Medal record
Representing Bangladesh
South Asian Games
Gold medal – first place	1999 Kathmandu
SAFF Championship
Runner-up	1999 India
- * Club domestic league appearances and goals

Iqbal Hossain (Bengali: ইকবাল হোসেন; born 7 July 1975) is a Bangladeshi former professional footballer who played as a defensive midfielder. He began his career playing in the Dhaka Premier Division League for Agrani Bank SC before moving to Abahani Limited Dhaka. Iqbal was also part of the 1999 South Asian Games winning Bangladesh team. He represented the Bangladesh national team between 1997 and 2001.

== International career ==
Iqbal was a key player in the Bangladesh team, for coach Samir Shaker. Iqbal was known as a very skilled and hardworking footballer in his playing life. He first came into the national team limelight during the 1999 SAFF Gold Cup, were Bangladesh reached the final, only to suffer a 1–0 defeat against India. During the 1999 South Asian Game, he had to face three dope tests during the tournament, which Bangladesh ended up winning. According to Iqbal, one of the team's players were usually selected by lottery for a dope test and unfortunately for him, he was selected for test three times during the tournament, both before the semi-finals and final. He also stated that even after the nations victory in the final, against hosts Nepal, the officials asked for him to attend another dope test.

Goal.	Date	Venue	Opponent	Score	Result	Competition
1.	24 April 1999	Fatorda Stadium, Goa	Pakistan	1–0	4–0	1999 SAFF Championship

== Post-playing career ==
Iqbal won the BFF elections in 2012 and 2016 as an executive member. He was team manager (team leader) of the Bangladesh national team during 2015 SAFF Championship in India, and also during the 2015 Bangabandhu Cup which was held in Dhaka.

On 14 March 2021, he was once again made the team manager for the national team, this time under Jamie Day for the 2021 Three Nations Cup, held in Nepal.

On 9 March 2022, the BFF reappointed Iqbal as team manager under national team head coach, Javier Cabrera.

== Honours ==
Abahani Limited Dhaka

- Dhaka Premier Division League: 1995, 2001
- National League: 2000
- Federation Cup: 1999, 2000

Mohammedan SC

- Dhaka Premier Division League: 1996

Muktijoddha Sangsad KC

- Dhaka Premier Division League: 1997–98

Brothers Union

- Dhaka Premier Division League: 2003–04
- National League: 2004

Bangladesh

- South Asian Games Gold medal: 1999
