= Zakir Hossain (footballer) =

Bangladeshi footballer

Personal information
- Full name: Mohammed Zakir Hossain
- Date of birth: 10 December 1971 (age 54)
- Place of birth: Munshiganj, Bangladesh
- Height: 1.68 m (5 ft 6 in)
- Position: Midfielder

Youth career
- 1987: Eastern SC

Senior career*
Years	Team	Apps	(Gls)
1988–1989	Mohammedan		
1990–1994	Dhaka Abahani		
1995–1996	Muktijoddha Sangsad		
1997–2000	Dhaka Abahani		
2003–2004	Dhaka Abahani		

International career
1991	Bangladesh U23		
1990–1999	Bangladesh	26	(0)
Medal record
Representing Bangladesh
Men's football
South Asian Games
Silver medal – second place	1995 Madras
SAFF Championship
Runner-up	1999 Bangladesh
- * Club domestic league appearances and goals

Zakir Hossain (Bengali: জাকির হোসেনে; born 10 December 1971) is a retired Bangladeshi footballer who played as an attacking midfielder. He played for the Bangladesh national team from 1990 to 1999.

== Club career ==
While training with Eastern Sporting Club, Zakir successfully trialed for the under-16 team of Mohammedan SC. In the same year, he was promoted to the senior team by coach Nasser Hejazi. In his First Division League debut, he came on as a substitute against BRTC Sports Club to score with his first touch. In 1990, he joined Abahani Limited Dhaka on a contract worth Tk 4.5 lakh. There, Zakir formed a midfield partnership with Russian midfielder Sergey Zhukov, which is deemed to be the main factor in the club's 1992 league triumph. In 1995, he joined Muktijoddha Sangsad KC on a contract worth Tk 12 lakh. In 1997, he returned to Abahani and was also appointed club captain. He was also part of the club's 2000 National Football League triumph, which marked the final trophy of his career. Zakir was a free agent for two seasons due to a severe knee injury and returned to the field in 2003.

== International career ==
Zakir made his international debut for the Bangladesh national team during the 1990 Asian Games in Beijing, China. In 1991, he represented the first Bangladesh U23 team during the 1992 Summer Olympics – Men's Asian Qualifiers. In 1993, he represented the senior team during the President's Gold Cup and also scored in a 1–1 draw with Malaysia U23. He last appearances for the national team came during the 1999 SAFF Gold Cup in Goa, India.

== Personal life ==
On 30 September 2010, Zakir represented Abahani Limited Dhaka in a friendly match arranged by Channel i between Abahani and Mohammedan SC legends.

On 22 April 2014, Zakir's elder brother, Anwar Hossain died at the age of 70.

== Career statistics ==
=== International ===
Appearances and goals by national team and year
National team	Year	Apps	Goals
Bangladesh
Bangladesh	1992	2	0
Bangladesh	1993	8	0
Bangladesh	1995	4	0
Bangladesh	1997	8	0
Bangladesh	1998	1	0
Bangladesh	1999	3	0
Bangladesh	Total	26	0

== Honours ==
Mohammedan SC

- Dhaka First Division League: 1988–89
- Federation Cup: 1989

Abahani Limited Dhaka

- Dhaka First Division/Premier Division League: 1989–90, 1992, 1994
- Independence Cup: 1990
- BTC Club Cup: 1991
- DMFA Cup: 1994
- National League: 2000

Bangladesh

- South Asian Games Silver medal: 1995
