= Abdulla Rasheed =

Maldivian footballer

Jooley
Personal information
- Full name: Abdulla Rasheed
- Date of birth: 1956
- Place of birth: Malé, Maldives
- Date of death: 29 May 2013 (aged 57)
- Place of death: Trivandrum, India
- Position: Defender

Senior career*
Years	Team	Apps	(Gls)
- Malé Zamaanee Musiky Club
- Victory Sports Club

International career
1979–????	Maldives		(1)
- * Club domestic league appearances and goals

Abdulla Rasheed (c. 1956 – 29 May 2013), commonly known as Juliet Abdulla Rasheed or simply Jooley, was a Maldivian footballer who played as a defender. He is remembered as the first player to score a goal for the Maldives national team.

Rasheed was widely known by the nickname Jooley, derived from his family house name, G. Juliet.

== Club career ==
Rasheed was regarded as a talismanic defender at Malé Zamaanee Musiky Club.

In Victory Sports Club, he led the club to three consecutive victories in the National Championship in 1985 as the captain. His playing career was cut short due to injuries.

== International career ==
Rasheed represented the Maldives team against a team from HMY Britannia during Queen Elizabeth II's visit to the Maldives in 1972. This was recorded the first time a Maldivian team played against a foreign team and went on to win the game 2–0. He got the opportunity because of his performance in the 1971 National Championship.

The first national football team was formed in 1979, He was a key player in the Maldives team that competed in the Indian Ocean Island Games in Réunion that year.

On 29 August 1979, Rasheed became the first Maldivian to score a goal at the international level. He scored during a 2–1 defeat, assisted by captain Ibrahim Ismail, against Comoros in the knockout qualification play-off of the 1979 Indian Ocean Island Games held in Stade Michel Volnay, Réunion.

=== International goals ===
#	Date	Venue	Opponent	Score	Result	Competition	Ref.
1	29 August 1979	Stade Michel Volnay, Saint-Pierre, Réunion	Comoros	1–2	1–2	1979 Indian Ocean Games	

== Later life and death ==
In September 2012, Rasheed began treatment for lung cancer. He died on 29 May 2013, aged 57, while receiving treatment at the Regional Cancer Centre in Trivandrum, India. He was survived by his wife, four sons, and four daughters.

== Legacy ==
On 17 January 2017, the Football Association of Maldives introduced the Jooley Award, presented annually at the Maldives Football Awards to the player who scores the “most beautiful goal” of the year, in honour of Rasheed’s contributions to Maldivian football.
