= Vyacheslav Solokho =

Uzbekistani football manager (born 1947)

Personal information
- Full name: Vyacheslav Vasilyevich Solokho
- Date of birth: 29 January 1947 (age 79)
- Place of birth: Uzbekistan
- Position: Midfielder

Senior career*
Years	Team	Apps	(Gls)
1966–1968	Pakhtakor	52	(4)
1969–1970	CSKA	11	(1)
1970–1972	Pakhtakor	55	(3)
1974	Shakhter	39	(10)
1975	Kairat	19	(0)
1976	Shakhter	19	(1)

Managerial career
- 1987: Sokhibkor
- 1997: MHSK
- 1998–1999: Maldives
- 2003: Taraz
- 2007: Lokomotiv
- Uzbekistan U19 (women)
- * Club domestic league appearances and goals

Vyacheslav Vasilyevich Solokho (Russian: Вячеслав Солохо; born 29 January 1947) is an Uzbekistani former football manager and footballer.

== Life and career ==
Solokho was born on 29 January 1947 in Uzbekistan. He mainly operated as a midfielder. He specifically operated as a central midfielder. He was known for his passing ability, vision, and technical ability. He has been married. He started his career with Uzbekistani side Pakhtakor. In 1969, he signed for Russian side CSKA. He helped the club win the league. In 1970, he returned to Uzbekistani side Pakhtakor. He helped the club achieve promotion. In 1974, he signed for Kazakhstani side Shakhter. In 1975, he signed for Kazakhstani side Kairat. In 1975, he returned to Kazakhstani side Shakhter.

Solokho attended the Higher School of Sports in Russia. In 1987, he was appointed manager of Uzbekistani side Sokhibkor. In 1997, he was appointed manager of Uzbekistani side MHSK. He helped the club win their first league title. In 1998, he was appointed manager of the Maldives national football team. In 2003, he was appointed manager of Kazakhstani side Taraz. he was described as "not very familiar with domestic coaches in Kazakhstan. However, he knows most of all the Uzbek footballers playing in Kazakhstan" while managing the club. In 2007, he was appointed manager of Uzbekistani side Lokomotiv. After that, he was appointed manager of the Uzbekistan women's under-19 national football team. After that, he worked as a manager consultant for the Uzbekistan Football Association.
