= Nasir Ismail =

Pakistani footballer

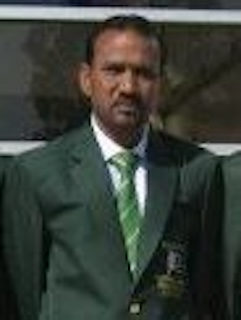
- Ismail in 2011

Personal information
- Full name: Syed Nasir Ismail
- Date of birth: 17 July 1967 (age 59)
- Place of birth: Pakistan
- Position: Midfielder

Team information
- Current team: Pakistan U17 (manager)

Senior career*
Years	Team	Apps	(Gls)
–2003	National Bank		

International career
1993–2003	Pakistan		

Managerial career
- National Bank
- 2005: Pakistan (assistant)
- 2007: Pakistan U13
- 2008: Pakistan U14
- 2009–2010: Pakistan (assistant)
- 2011–2012: Pakistan (assistant)
- 2013: Pakistan U19
- 2019: Pakistan U19
- 2020–2022: Masha United
- 2025–: Pakistan U17
- * Club domestic league appearances and goals

Syed Nasir Ismail (Urdu: سید ناصر اسماعیل; born 17 July 1967) is a Pakistani football manager and former footballer who played as a midfielder.

== Club career ==
Ismail represented the National Bank departmental team at the National Football Championship.

== International career ==
Ismail made his international debut with the Pakistan at the 1994 FIFA World Cup qualification in 1993. He later featured in several tournaments including the 1999 SAFF Gold Cup and the 2004 AFC Asian Cup qualifiers in 2003.

== Managerial career ==
After his retirement as player, Ismail took coaching as his career, mainly coaching his team National Bank. He helped the team win promotion to the Pakistan Premier League after winning the 2004–05 PFF National League.

In 2005, he acted as assistant coach of the Pakistan national football team under Salman Sharida. He was eventually sacked after developing differences with Sharida.

He acted as head coach of the Pakistan national under-13 team during a junior event in Bangladesh in 2007. He later coached the national under-14 team that featured in the AFC Festival of Football in May 2008 in Iran. In 2008, he obtained an AFC A License.

In 2009, Nasir was again appointed as assistant coach of Pakistan under György Kottán. He returned to the assistant coach post, this time under Tariq Lutfi for the 2011 SAFF Championship, and later continued with the position from 2011 till 2012 under Zaviša Milosavljević.

In 2013, Ismail was appointed head coach of the Pakistan national under-19 team for the 2014 AFC U-19 Championship qualification. In 2019, he was again appointed to lead the team at the 2020 AFC U-19 Championship qualification.

He has also served as the coach of Masha United from 2020 to 2022.

Nasir was appointed as the head coach for the Pakistan under-17 football team for the 2025 SAFF U-17 Championship held in Colombo, Sri Lanka.
