= Khulna District Stadium =

Stadium in Khulna, Bangladesh

Coordinates: 22°48′51.23″N 89°34′07.49″E

- Interactive map of Khulna District Stadium
- Location: Khulna, Bangladesh
- Owner: National Sports Council
- Operator: National Sports Council
- Capacity: 12,000
- Surface: Grass

Tenant
- Khulna Football Team

Khulna District Stadium, established in 1958, is a football stadium which is located near the Khulna Shishu Hospital, Khulna, Bangladesh.

== See also ==
- Stadiums in Bangladesh
- List of football stadiums in Bangladesh
- Football in Bangladesh
- Sport in Bangladesh
- Cricket in Bangladesh
- Bangladesh Army Stadium
