= Mohamed Wildhan =

Maldivian footballer

Mohamed Wildhan is a former football player, who played for Maldives. He was the top scorer in 1999 SAFF Championship.
