= Dev Narayan Chaudhary =

Nepali footballer (born 1972)

Personal information
- Date of birth: 13 February 1972 (age 54)
- Place of birth: Kathmandu, Nepal
- Height: 1.73 m (5 ft 8 in)
- Position: Defender

Senior career*
Years	Team	Apps	(Gls)
–2001	Nepal Police Club		
2001–2002	Mohammedan SC		
2002–2004	Nepal Police Club		

International career
1994–2003	Nepal	23	(1)
- * Club domestic league appearances and goals

Dev Narayan Chaudhary (Nepali: देवनारायण चौधरी; born 13 February 1972) is a Nepali footballer who played as a defender.

== Life and career ==
Chaudhary was born on 13 February 1972 in Kathmandu, Nepal. He played volleyball as a child. He is the son of Thakanlal Chaudhary and Godi Chaudhary. He mainly operated as a defender. He started his career with Nepalese side Nepal Police Club. In 2001, he signed for Indian side Mohammedan SC. In 2002, he returned to Nepalese side Nepal Police Club. After retiring from professional football, he lived in the United States. He has worked as a police officer. He has been married. He has a son.

Chaudhary was a Nepal international. He made twenty-three appearances and scored one goal while playing for the Nepal national football team. He played for the Nepal national football team for 1998 FIFA World Cup qualification and 2002 FIFA World Cup qualification. He helped the Nepal national football team achieve second place at the 1999 South Asian Games. He helped the Nepal national football team win the 1993 South Asian Games.
