= Mausoom Abdul Ghafoor =

Maldivian footballer

Personal information
- Full name: Mausoom Abdul Ghafoor
- Date of birth: 20 March 1976 (age 50)
- Place of birth: Maldives
- Height: 1.68 m (5 ft 6 in)
- Position: Forward

Team information
- Current team: Hurriyya

Senior career*
Years	Team	Apps	(Gls)
–1999	Hurriyya		
2000–2002	New Radiant		
2003–	Hurriyya		

International career
1997–2000	Maldives		
- * Club domestic league appearances and goals

Mausoom Abdul Ghafoor (born 20 March 1976) is a Maldivian footballer who is well known by his nickname "Maasey". He plays at Hurriyya as a forward.

== International career ==
Mausoom has appeared in FIFA World Cup qualifying matches for the Maldives.
