= 1999 SAFF Gold Cup =

1999 SAFF Coca-Cola Cup

Tournament details
- Host country: India
- Dates: 22 April – 1 May
- Teams: 6 (from SAFF confederations)
- Venue: 1 (in 1 host city)

Final positions
- Champions: India (3rd title)
- Runners-up: Bangladesh
- Third place: Maldives
- Fourth place: Nepal

Tournament statistics
- Matches played: 10
- Goals scored: 26 (2.6 per match)
- Top scorer(s): (Nepal) Naresh Joshi (India) Baichung Bhutia (Bangladesh) Mizanur Rahman Dawn (Maldives) Mohamed Wildhan (3 goals)
- Best player: (Pakistan) Sarfraz Rasool

The 1999 SAFF Gold Cup (also known as SAFF Coca-Cola Cup due to sponsorship reasons) was held in Goa, India between 22 April 1999 and 1 May 1999. The Nehru Stadium in Margao played host to all matches. India successfully defended their title by beating Bangladesh in the final, by doing so they became the first team to retain the title as well.

== Venue ==
1999 SAFF Gold Cup is located in India	Goa
1999 SAFF Gold Cup is located in India	Fatorda Stadium
1999 SAFF Gold Cup is located in India	19,000

== Group stage ==
=== Group A ===
Team	Pld	W	D	L	GF	GA	GD	Pts
Bangladesh	2	1	1	0	4	0	+4	4
India	2	1	1	0	2	0	+2	4
Pakistan	2	0	0	2	0	6	−6	0

Source: RSSSF
22 April 1999

India	0–0	Bangladesh
	Report

Fatorda Stadium, Margao

24 April 1999

Pakistan	0–4	Bangladesh
	Report	Iqbal 7'; Alfaz 33'; Dawn 62', 65'

Fatorda Stadium, Margao

26 April 1999

India	2–0	Pakistan
Bhutia 23'; Pasha 87'	Report

Fatorda Stadium, Margao

=== Group B ===
Team	Pld	W	D	L	GF	GA	GD	Pts
Maldives	2	1	1	0	3	2	+1	4
Nepal	2	1	0	1	5	5	0	3
Sri Lanka	2	0	1	1	2	3	−1	1

Source: RSSSF
23 April 1999

Sri Lanka	0–0	Maldives
	Report

Fatorda Stadium, Margao

25 April 1999

Sri Lanka	2–3	Nepal
Pereira 22'; Amanulla 24'	Report	Joshi 4', 41', 81'

Fatorda Stadium, Margao

27 April 1999

Nepal	2–3	Maldives
Khadka 65', 90'	Report	Ismail 1'; Wildhan 74'; Mausoom 85'

Fatorda Stadium, Margao

== Knockout phase ==
=== Bracket ===
Semi-finals
A1	Bangladesh	2
B2	Nepal	1
B1	Maldives	1
A2	India	2

Final
B2	Bangladesh	0
B1	India	2
3rd Place
A1	Maldives	2
A2	Nepal	0

=== Semi-finals ===
29 April 1999

Bangladesh	2–1	Nepal
Dawn 5'; Alfaz 62'	Report	Maharajan 74'

Fatorda Stadium, Margao

29 April 1999

Maldives	1–2	India
Wildhan 43'	Report	Bhutia 30'; Coutinho 84'

Fatorda Stadium, Margao

=== Third-place match ===
1 May 1999

Maldives	2–0	Nepal
Wildhan 60'; Mohamed Ibrahim 85'	Report

Fatorda Stadium, Margao

=== Final ===
1 May 1999

Bangladesh	0–2	India
	Report	Coutinho 26'; Bhutia 44'

Fatorda Stadium, Margao

== Statistics ==
=== Goalscorers ===
There were 26 goals scored in 10 matches, for an average of 2.6 goals per match.

3 goals

- (Bangladesh) Mizanur Rahman Dawn
- (India) Bhaichung Bhutia
- (Nepal) Naresh Joshi
- (Maldives) Mohamed Wildhan

2 goals

- (Bangladesh) Alfaz Ahmed
- (India) Bruno Coutinho
- (Nepal) Hari Khadka

1 goal

- (Bangladesh) Iqbal Hossain
- (India) Syed Sabir Pasha
- (Sri Lanka) Roshan Pereira
- (Sri Lanka) Mohamed Amanulla
- (Maldives) Ismail Shah
- (Maldives) Mausoom Abdul Ghafoor
- (Nepal) Balgopal Maharajan
- (Maldives) Mohamed Ibrahim

== Champion ==
SAFF Gold Cup 1999

India
Third title
