= Mizanur Rahman Dawn =

Professional association footballer

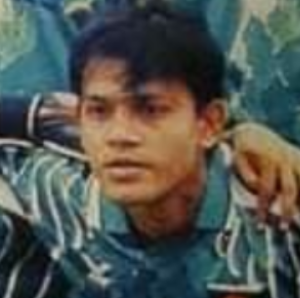
- Dawn with Bangladesh at the 1999 SA Games

Personal information
- Full name: Mohamed Mizanur Rahman Dawn
- Date of birth: 1 May 1975 (age 51)
- Place of birth: Munshiganj, Bangladesh
- Height: 1.65 m (5 ft 5 in)
- Position: Centre-forward

Senior career*
Years	Team	Apps	(Gls)
1994–1995	Eskaton SSC		
1995–1997	Brothers Union		
1997–2000	Mohammedan SC		
2000–2001	Dhaka Abahani		
2001–2002	Muktijoddha Sangsad		
2002	Arambagh KS		
2003–2005	Rahmatganj MFS		

International career
1996	Bangladesh U19		
1999	Bangladesh		

Managerial career
- 2016: Mohammedan SC (Interim)
- 2022: Bikrampur Kings
Medal record
Representing Bangladesh
South Asian Games
Gold medal – first place	1999 Kathmandu
SAFF Championship
Runner-up	1999 India
- * Club domestic league appearances and goals

Mizanur Rahman Dawn (Bengali: মিজানুর রহমান ডন; born 1 May 1975) is a Bangladeshi football coach and former player. He played for the Bangladesh in the 1999 SAFF Gold Cup, where he was among the four joint top scorers in the competition. After retiring he was part of the Mohammedan SC coaching panel.

== International goals ==
Scores and results list Bangladesh's goal tally first.

#	Date	Venue	Opponent	Score	Result	Competition
1.	24 April 1999	Fatorda Stadium, Goa	Pakistan	3–0	4–0	1999 SAFF Gold Cup
2.	24 April 1999	Fatorda Stadium, Goa	Pakistan	4–0	4–0	1999 SAFF Gold Cup
3.	29 April 1999	Fatorda Stadium, Goa	Nepal	1–0	2–0	1999 SAFF Gold Cup
4.	25 November 1999	Tahnoun bin Mohammed Stadium, UAE	Sri Lanka	1–1	3–1	2000 AFC Asian Cup Qualifiers

== Honours ==
Mohammedan SC

- Dhaka Premier Division League: 1999
- All Airlines Gold Cup: 1999

Abahani Limited Dhaka

- Federation Cup: 2000

Muktijoddha Sangsad KC

- Federation Cup: 2001

Rahmatganj MFS

- Dhaka First Division League: 2004–05

Bangladesh

- South Asian Games Gold medal: 1999
