= Ismail Shah (footballer) =

Maldivian footballer

Personal information
- Date of birth: 14 February 1971 (age 55)
- Place of birth: Maldives
- Position: Striker

Senior career*
Years	Team	Apps	(Gls)
–2001	New Radiant S.C.		
2002	Victory Sports Club		
2003–2004	New Radiant S.C.		

International career
1997–2003	Maldives		

Managerial career
- 2007: Maldives
- * Club domestic league appearances and goals

Ismail Shah (born 14 February 1971 in the Maldives) is a Maldivian former footballer.

== Career ==
=== International ===
Representing the Maldives for much of his football career, Shah was captain of the team in 2003 and participated in the 1997 SAFF Championship where he scored one goal facing Sri Lanka.

=== Post-football ===
After his retirement, Shah served as deputy youth minister and General Secretary of the Football Association of Maldives. He then became deputy minister at the Ministry of Fisheries and Agriculture and has experience being a football match official.

Suffering a heart-attack in the early hours of February 20, 2017, Shah was admitted posthaste to the ICU of Indhira Gandhi Memorial Hospital; Fortunately, his condition never retrograded with it only being a minor heart attack and, three days later, the former footballer was taken out from the Critical Care Center at the hospital. By the 27th of February, Shah was released from hospital, with his doctor advising him to take more care of his well-being.

Assuming the role of Advisor at the Ministry of Youth and Sports in 2013, the former player was assigned the role of national team head coach for a 2007 friendly fronting Malaysia, also managing the Red Snappers in their 2010 FIFA World Cup qualification round against Yemen in which they won 2-0 and lost 3-0.

== Personal life ==
The former forward has a brother named Maadhih Ismail.

== Individual awards ==
- Haveeru Golden Boot (2): 1998, 1999
