= Naresh Joshi =

Nepalese footballer

Naresh Joshi is a former international footballer from Nepal. He holds the record for scoring the first and only hat trick for the Nepal national team, in SAFF Championship. Naresh Joshi scored three goals in Nepal's 3–2 victory against Sri Lanka which helped Nepal proceed to the semifinal in the 1999 SAFF Championship in India. He played three years for the Nepal national team and his club career included stints with clubs like Three Star Club, Friends club and RCT.
