= Maldives national football team =

Men's association football team

Maldives
- Nickname(s): The Sea, Red Snappers
- Association: Football Association of Maldives (FAM)
- Confederation: AFC (Asia)
- Sub-confederation: SAFF (South Asia)
- Head coach: István Urbányi
- Captain: Hamza Mohamed
- Most caps: Imran Mohamed (110)
- Top scorer: Ali Ashfaq (58)
- Home stadium: National Football Stadium
- FIFA code: MDV
First colours	Second colours	Third colours

FIFA ranking
- Current: 173 (7 October 2026)
- Highest: 124 (July–August 2006)
- Lowest: 183 (August–September 1997)

First international
- Seychelles 9–0 Maldives (Saint-Pierre, Réunion; 27 August 1979)

Biggest win
- Maldives 12–0 Mongolia (Male, Maldives; 3 December 2003)

Biggest defeat
- Iran 17–0 Maldives (Damascus, Syria; 2 June 1997)

SAFF Championship
- Appearances: 11 (first in 1995)
- Best result: Champions (2008, 2018)

AFC Challenge Cup
- Appearances: 2 (first in 2012)
- Best result: Third place (2014)
Medal record
Men's football
SAFF Championship
Gold medal – first place	2018 Bangladesh	Team
Gold medal – first place	2008 Maldives & Sri Lanka	Team
Silver medal – second place	2009 Bangladesh	Team
Silver medal – second place	2003 Bangladesh	Team
Silver medal – second place	1997 Nepal	Team
Bronze medal – third place	1999 India	Team
South Asian Games
Silver medal – second place	1991 Colombo	Team
Bronze medal – third place	1984 Kathmandu	Team
AFC Challenge Cup
Bronze medal – third place	2014 Maldives	Team

The Maldives national football team (Dhivehi: ދިވެހިރާއްޖޭ ގައުމީ ފުޓްބޯލް ޓީމް) represents the Maldives in international football and is controlled by the Football Association of Maldives. It is a member of the Asian Football Confederation (AFC).

The Maldives' most significant success was winning the 2008 SAFF Championship where they beat India in the final 1–0. They won their second local title in 2018 SAFF Championship, once again by beating India in the final.

== History ==
At the 1987 South Asian Games held in Calcutta, the Football Association of Maldives did not have a separately assembled national team and sent Maldives National Championship winning club New Radiant to represent Maldives internationally under Sri Lankan coach Sumith Walpola. The team failed to get past the group stage losing 0–1 to Pakistan, and 0–5 to eventual champions India.

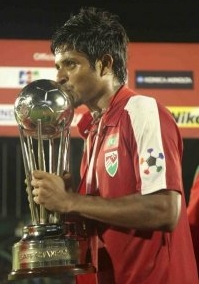
Ibrahim Fazeel with the 2008 SAFF Championship trophy

The 2008 SAFF Championship draw, which took place on 26 February 2007, placed Maldives in group A, alongside Nepal, India, and Pakistan. Maldives started with a comfortable 3–0 win over Pakistan. In their second match they defeated Nepal 4–1. They lost their last group stage match against India, 0–1. They advanced to the semi-finals and defeated Sri Lanka 0–1. They then advanced to the final for the third time in SAFF Championship history.

In the final three minutes of full-time during the SAFF Championship final against the four time SAFF Championship Champions India, Mukhthar Naseer scored a single goal from a corner kick taken by Ali Ashfaq, winning the SAFF Championship for Maldives for the first time in their history. Maldives won the SAFF Championship by scoring nine goals and conceding two. In 2008 SAFF Championship, Ali Ashfaq won the Best Player award. Maldives was the team who scored the most goals in this year's competition along with their rivals India. They were also the team who conceded the fewest goals in the tournament.

At the 2009 SAFF Championship, Maldives were drawn with the rivals India in group A, along with Afghanistan and Nepal. In the semi-final, they defeated Sri Lanka with a comfortable score line of 5–1, but they lost 3–1 to eventual winners India from a penalty shootout in the final after playing 120 minutes without seeing a goal from either sides. Ahmed Thoriq shared the top scorer award with Bangladesh's Enamul Haque and Sri Lanka's Channa Ediri Bandanage scoring four goals each in this competition. This was the second time Maldives lost the SAFF Championship final in penalties, and Bangabandhu National Stadium was the venue on both occasions.

At the 2013 SAFF Championship, Maldives were drawn in the group B alongside Afghanistan, Bhutan and Sri Lanka. They started the group stage by renewing their record of scoring the most goals by a team in a single game; winning 10–0 against Sri Lanka. In this match, skipper Ali Ashfaq scored a double hat-trick and broke the record of India's IM Vijayan who holds the record of all-time top scorer of the tournament with 12 goals. He also made a new record of scoring the highest number of goals by a single player in a match in the tournament. Remaining goals of this match came from Assadhulla Abdulla, Hassan Adhuham, Ali Fasir and Ali Umar. In their second match, Ali Ashfaq scored four goals and Ali Fasir scored a brace while Mohammad Umair and Ali Umar scored one goal each in the 8–2 win against Bhutan. Maldives' third match of the group stage against Afghanistan ended goalless. However, Maldives faced India for a record fourth time in a semi-final match of this competition, and never won a semi-final match against them as Maldives lost 1–0 in this semi-final match at the Dasarath Rangasala Stadium, Kathmandu, Nepal. Ali Ashfaq won the Golden Boot Award, scoring 10 goals in the competition. He now holds the record of competition's all-time top scorer with 18 goals, and the player to score the highest number of goals in one SAFF Championship; 10. India's IM Vijayan was the previous player to hold this record, scoring 6 goals in the 1997 edition.

Maldives hosted the 2021 SAFF Championship, failing to advance to the knockout round from the lone group phase, achieving victories over Bangladesh and Sri Lanka, and losing against Nepal and India in their four matches. The team was placed at the top of the table until the eventual defeat against India in the last match of the group stage. Maldives left the tournament at the group stage with a win and two losses.

== Team image ==
=== Home stadium ===
National Football Stadium (Dhivehi: ގައުމީ ފުޓުބޯޅަ ދަނޑު) is a multi-purpose stadium in Malé, Maldives. It is used mostly for football matches of the Dhivehi League, Maldives FA Cup, and International matches. The stadium holds around 11,850 spectators.

=== Kits ===
Kit supplier	Period
(Germany) Adidas	2011–2015
(Spain) Joma	2015–2019
(Spain) Kelme	2019–2024
(Maldives) JERZIA	2025–present

== Results and fixtures ==
The following is a list of match results in the last 12 months, as well as any future matches that have been scheduled.

Win Draw Loss Fixture

=== 2026 ===
31 March 2026 2027 AFC Asian Cup qualification	Maldives	2–1	Timor-Leste	Malé, Maldives
15:30 UTC+5:30	Irufaan 89'; Fasir 90+4' (pen.)	Report (AFC)	Bakhito 67'	Stadium: National Football Stadium; Attendance: 500; Referee: Razlan Joffri Ali (Malaysia)

1 June 2026 Diamond Jubilee Football Tournament	Maldives	0–1	Afghanistan	Malé, Maldives
21:00 UTC+5:30		Report	Roma 79'	Stadium: National Football Stadium; Attendance: 1,028; Referee: Aditya Purkayastha (India)

4 June 2026 Diamond Jubilee Football Tournament	Maldives	0–3	Pakistan	Malé, Maldives
16:00 UTC+5:30		Report	Nawaz 53'; Arshad 84'; Hamid 87'	Stadium: National Football Stadium; Attendance: 1,050; Referee: Ashwin Kumar (India)

7 June 2026 Diamond Jubilee Football Tournament	Maldives	1–1	Bangladesh Olympic	Malé, Maldives
21:00 UTC+5:30	Fasir 14' (pen.)	Report	Mirajul 54' (pen.)	Stadium: National Football Stadium; Attendance: 2,150; Referee: Senthilnathan Sekaran (India)

24 September 2026 Friendly	China	3–0	Maldives	Chongqing, China
19:35 UTC+8	Wang Ziming 50', 56', 63'	Report		Stadium: Longxing Football Stadium; Referee: Asker Nadjafaliev

28 September 2026 Friendly	Kyrgyzstan	5–0	Maldives	Bishkek, Kyrgyzstan
20:00 UTC+6	Atabayev 11', 23'; Sirozhiddin 20'; Murzakov 32'; Kojo 42'	Report		Stadium: Dolen Omurzakov Stadium

1 October 2026 Friendly	Lebanon	6–0	Maldives	Bishkek, Kyrgyzstan
20:00 UTC+6	Chakroun 3', 36', 42'; Maish 52' (o.g.); Kassas 83', 90+2'	Report		Stadium: Dolen Omurzakov Stadium; Referee: Alimardon Baynazarov (Kyrgyzstan)

8 November 2026 2026 SAFF Championship	Maldives	0–3	Pakistan	Dhaka, Bangladesh
15:30 +6:00		SAFF; FIFA	M. Abdullah 3' (pen.); Najeeb 8', 23'	Stadium: National Stadium; Attendance: 203; Referee: Ahmad A'Qashah (Singapore)

11 November 2026 2026 SAFF Championship	Maldives	0–1	India	Dhaka, Bangladesh
15:30 +6:00		SAFF; FIFA	Suhail 38' (pen.)	Stadium: National Stadium; Attendance: 1,969; Referee: Mohammed Khalfan Al Manai (Oman)

== Coaching staff ==
Staff
Head Coach	(Hungary) István Urbányi
Assistant Coach	(Maldives) Ahmed Shakir (Maldives) Ismail Mahfooz (Maldives) Mohamed Imran
Goalkeeping coach	(Maldives) Hassan Hameed
Fitness Coach	(Maldives) Mueena Mohamed
Technical Director	(Maldives) Ahmed Shakir
Kitman	(Maldives) Ahmed Ismail
Physiotherapist	(Maldives) Sharafudheen
Team Manager	(Maldives) Shibah

=== Coaching history ===
Caretaker managers are listed in italics.

- (Sri Lanka) Neville Abeygunawardena (1979)
- Unknown (1983–86)
- (Sri Lanka) Sumith Walpola (1987)
- (Sri Lanka) P.D. Sirisena (1988)
- (Germany) Peter Obermeyer (1989)
- (Hungary) Miklós Temesvári (1991–93)
- (Romania) Victor Stănculescu (1994–95)
- (Bolivia) Rómulo Cortez (1996–97)
- (Uzbekistan) Vyacheslav Solokho (1998–1999)
- (Bulgaria) Yordan Stoykov (1999–2000)
- (Slovakia) Jozef Jankech (2001–03)
- (Portugal) Manuel Gomes (2003–2004)
- (Bulgaria) Yordan Stoykov (2005–07)
- (Slovakia) Jozef Jankech (2008)
- (Hungary) István Urbányi (2009–10)
- (Argentina) Andrés Cruciani (2010–11)
- (Hungary) István Urbányi (2011–13)
- (Maldives) Ali Nashid (2013–14)
- (Croatia) Drago Mamić (2014)
- (Bulgaria) Velizar Popov (2015)
- (Maldives) Ismail Mahfooz (2015)
- (New Zealand) Ricki Herbert (2015–16)
- (Maldives) Ismail Mahfooz (2016)
- (Australia) Darren Stewart (2016–18)
- (Croatia) Petar Segrt (2018–19)
- (Netherlands) Martin Koopman (2020–21)
- (Maldives) Ali Suzain (2021)
- (Italy) Francesco Moriero (2021–2023)
- (Maldives) Ali Suzain (2024–2025)
- (Maldives) Mohamed Siyaz (2025)
- (Hungary) István Urbányi (2026–)

== Players ==
=== Current squad ===
The following players were named in the squad for the 2026 SAFF Championship.

Caps and goals are correct 1 October 2026, after the match against Lebanon.

No.	Pos.	Player	Date of birth (age)	Caps	Goals	Club
1	GK	Hussain Shareef	5 September 1998 (age 28)	22	0	(Football Association of Maldives) Maziya S&RC
18	GK	Mohammed Ashwaan	4 September 1997 (age 29)	0	0	(Football Association of Maldives) Odi Sports Club
22	GK	Mohammed Shafeeu	22 July 1988 (age 38)	0	0	(Football Association of Maldives) Victory
2	DF	Samooh Ali (Captain)	5 July 1996 (age 30)	57	1	(Football Association of Maldives) Maziya S&RC
4	DF	Hussain Sifaau	4 February 1996 (age 30)	50	1	(Football Association of Maldives) Maziya S&RC
5	DF	Nassah Ibrahim	11 May 2007 (age 19)	3	0	(Football Association of Maldives) Maziya S&RC
12	DF	Ahmed Aiham	23 March 1998 (age 28)	10	0	(Football Association of Maldives) Odi Sports Club
15	DF	Amdhan Ali	11 September 1992 (age 34)	33	1	(Football Association of Maldives) New Radiant
19	DF	Ahmed Maish Rasheed	11 July 2004 (age 22)	3	0	(Football Association of Maldives) Victory Sports Club
20	DF	Hassan Eenaaz	12 June 2000 (age 26)	6	0	(Football Association of Maldives) TC Sports Club
6	MF	Ali Hamdhaan	10 May 1997 (age 29)	0	0	(Football Association of Maldives) Buru Sports Club
8	MF	Ibrahim Aisam	7 May 1997 (age 29)	39	2	(Football Association of Maldives) Maziya S&RC
16	MF	Ahzam Rasheed	18 September 2007 (age 19)	5	0	(Football Association of Maldives) Odi Sports Club
21	MF	Ibrahim Waheed Hassan	15 November 1995 (age 31)	26	6	(Football Association of Maldives) Odi Sports Club
26	MF	Nisham Mohamed	31 January 1999 (age 27)	6	0	(Football Association of Maldives) Maziya S&RC
7	FW	Ali Fasir	4 September 1988 (age 38)	91	18	(Football Association of Maldives) New Radiant S.C.
9	FW	Ethan Ibrahim Zaki	5 June 2002 (age 24)	1	0	(Football Association of Maldives) New Radiant S.C.
10	FW	Ahmed Aiham	26 February 2003 (age 23)	17	0	(Football Association of Maldives) Maziya S&RC
11	FW	Abdulla Looth	8 February 2005 (age 21)	1	0	(Football Association of Maldives) Maziya S&RC
13	FW	Mohamed Naim	7 October 1996 (age 30)	19	1	(Football Association of Maldives) New Radiant S.C.
17	FW	Ibrahim Mahudhee	22 August 1993 (age 33)	56	5	(Football Association of Maldives) Maziya S&RC
23	FW	Muzdhan Hassan	4 May 2006 (age 20)	4	0	(Football Association of Maldives) Odi Sports Club
24	FW	Naiz Hassan	10 May 1996 (age 30)	69	12	(Football Association of Maldives) Victory Sports Club

=== Recent call-ups ===
The following players have also been called up to the squad within the last twelve months.

Pos.	Player	Date of birth (age)	Caps	Goals	Club	Latest call-up
FW	Ali Haafiz		1	0	(Maldives) Club Eagles	v. Timor-Leste, 31 March 2026

== Player records ==
As of 4 June 2026
Players in bold are still active with Maldives.

=== Most appearances ===
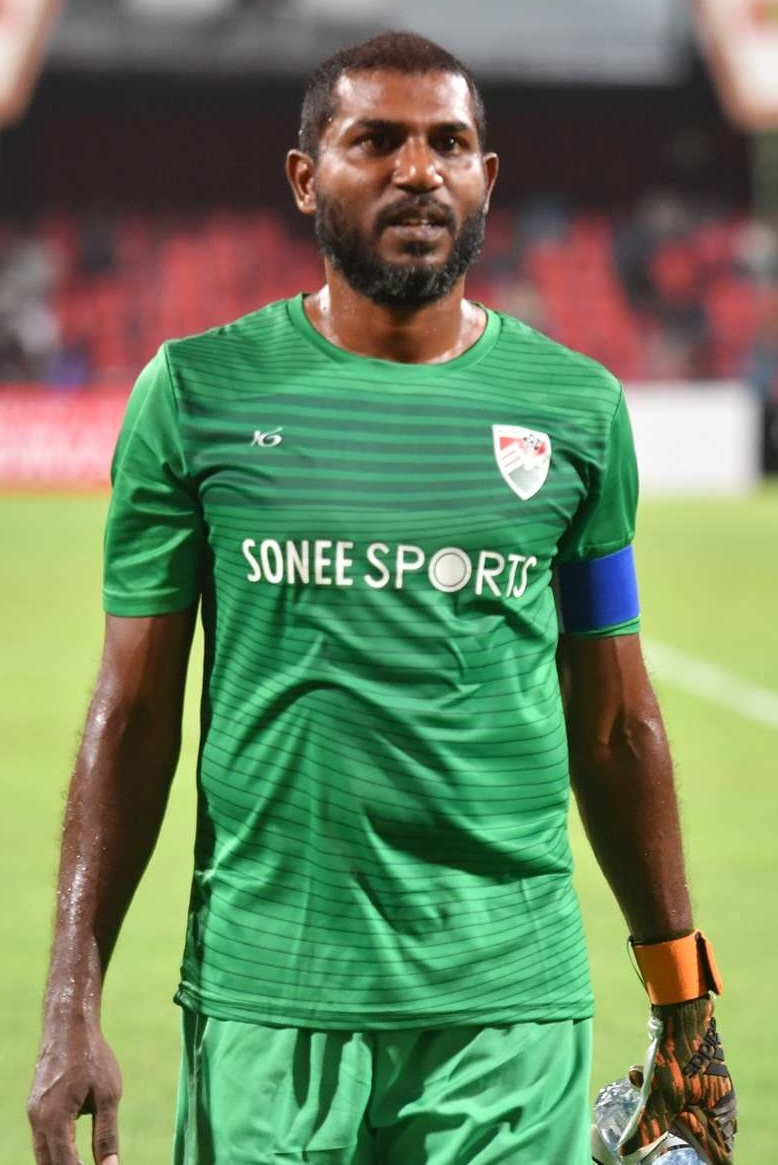
Imran Mohamed is Maldives' most capped player with 110 caps

Rank	Player	Caps	Goals	Period
1	Imran Mohamed	110	0	2000–2016
2	**Ali Ashfaq**	101	58	2003–present
3	**Ali Fasir**	88	18	2010–present
4	Akram Abdul Ghanee	85	2	2007–2022
5	Mohamed Umair	75	9	2007–2022
6	**Hamza Mohamed**	74	7	2015–present
7	Ibrahim Fazeel	72	22	2000–2014
8	Ashad Ali	63	3	2007–2021
9	**Naiz Hassan**	59	12	2015–present
10	Mohamed Arif	57	1	2008–2018

=== Top goalscorers ===
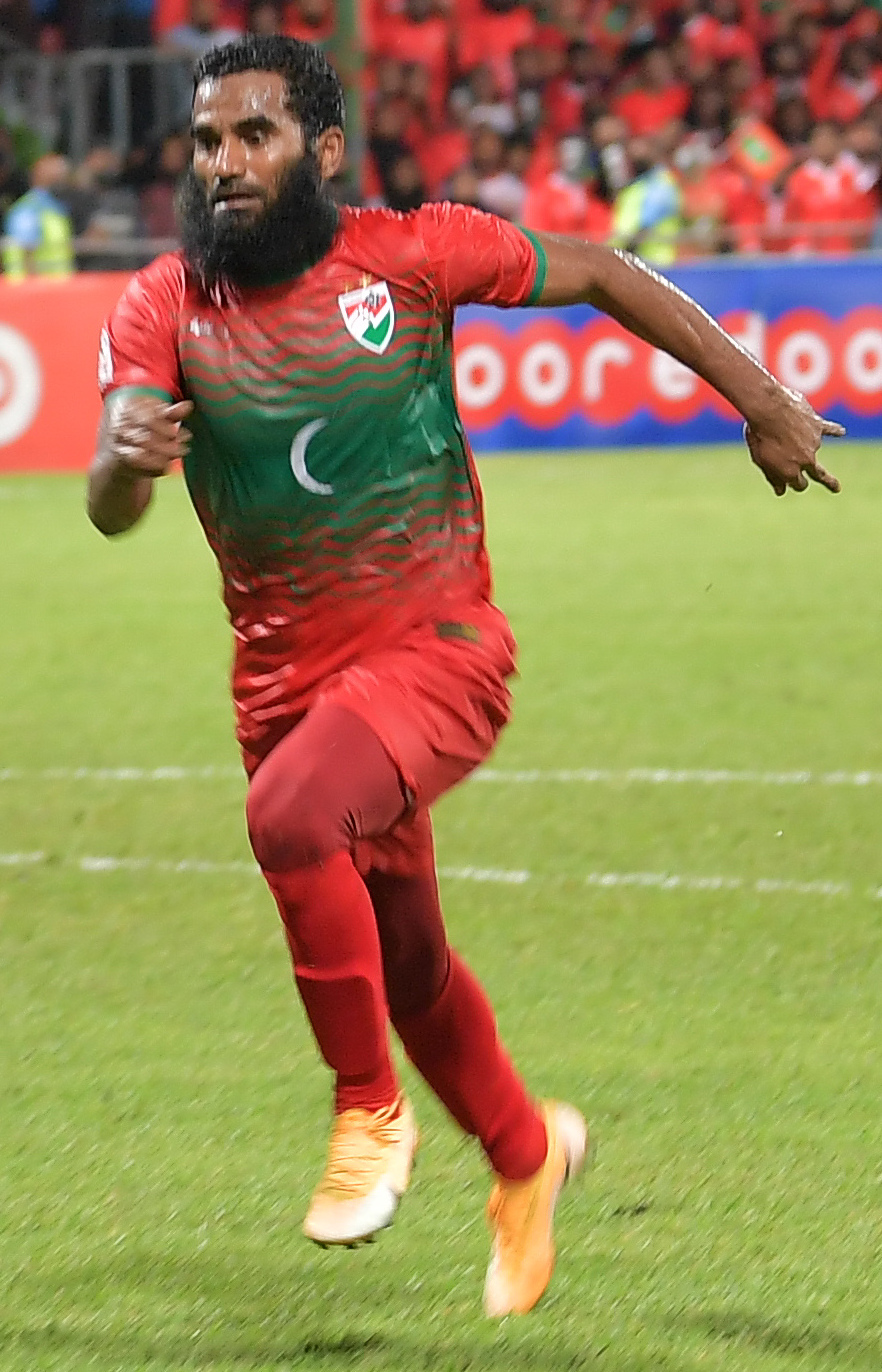
Ali Ashfaq is Maldives' top scorer with 58 goals

Rank	Player	Goals	Caps	Ratio	Period
1	**Ali Ashfaq**	58	101	0.57	2003–present
2	Ibrahim Fazeel	22	72	0.31	2000–2014
3	**Ali Fasir**	18	88	0.2	2010–present
4	Ahmed Thoriq	15	34	0.44	2003–2013
5	**Naiz Hassan**	12	59	0.2	2015–present
5	Ali Umar	12	45	0.27	1999–2015
7	Mohamed Nizam	10	42	0.24	1997–2004
8	Mohamed Umair	9	75	0.12	2007–2022
9	Asadhulla Abdulla	8	44	0.18	2012–2022
10	Adam Abdul Latheef	7	20	0.35	1997–2002
10	**Hamza Mohamed**	7	74	0.09	2015–present

== Competitive record ==
=== FIFA World Cup ===
FIFA World Cup									Qualification					
Year	Round	Position	Pld	W	D*	L	F	A	Pld	W	D	L	F	A
(Uruguay) 1930	Part of United Kingdom								Part of United Kingdom					
(Italy) 1934	Part of United Kingdom								Part of United Kingdom					
(France) 1938	Part of United Kingdom								Part of United Kingdom					
(Brazil) 1950	Part of United Kingdom								Part of United Kingdom					
(Switzerland) 1954	Part of United Kingdom								Part of United Kingdom					
(Sweden) 1958	Part of United Kingdom								Part of United Kingdom					
(Chile) 1962	Part of United Kingdom								Part of United Kingdom					
(England) 1966	Not a FIFA member								Not a FIFA member					
(Mexico) 1970	Not a FIFA member								Not a FIFA member					
(West Germany) 1974	Not a FIFA member								Not a FIFA member					
(Argentina) 1978	Not a FIFA member								Not a FIFA member					
(Spain) 1982	Not a FIFA member								Not a FIFA member					
(Mexico) 1986	Not a FIFA member								Not a FIFA member					
(Italy) 1990	Withdrew								Withdrew					
(United States) 1994	Did not enter								Did not enter					
(France) 1998	Did not qualify								6	0	0	6	0	59
(South Korea) (Japan) 2002	Did not qualify								6	1	1	4	8	19
(Germany) 2006	Did not qualify								8	3	1	4	18	14
(South Africa) 2010	Did not qualify								2	1	0	1	2	3
(Brazil) 2014	Did not qualify								2	0	0	2	0	5
(Russia) 2018	Did not qualify								8	2	0	6	8	20
(Qatar) 2022	Did not qualify								8	2	1	5	7	20
(Canada) (Mexico) (United States) 2026	Did not qualify								2	0	1	1	2	3
(Morocco) (Portugal) (Spain) 2030	To be determined								To be determined					
(Saudi Arabia) 2034	To be determined								To be determined					
Total	–	0/8	–	–	–	–	–	–	42	9	4	29	45	143

=== AFC Asian Cup ===
AFC Asian Cup Finals record									AFC Asian Cup qualification					
Year	Result	Position	Pld	W	D*	L	GF	GA	Pld	W	D	L	GF	GA
(British Hong Kong) 1956	Part of United Kingdom								Part of United Kingdom					
(South Korea) 1960	Part of United Kingdom								Part of United Kingdom					
(Israel) 1964	Part of United Kingdom								Part of United Kingdom					
(Iran) 1968	Did not enter								Did not enter					
(Thailand) 1972	Did not enter								Did not enter					
(Iran) 1976	Did not enter								Did not enter					
(Kuwait) 1980	Did not enter								Did not enter					
(Singapore) 1984	Did not enter								Did not enter					
(Qatar) 1988	Did not enter								Did not enter					
(Japan) 1992	Withdrew								Withdrew					
(United Arab Emirates) 1996	Did not qualify								6	0	0	6	4	30
(Lebanon) 2000	Did not qualify								6	0	0	6	2	24
(China) 2004	Did not qualify								2	0	1	1	1	3
(Indonesia) (Malaysia) (Thailand) (Vietnam) 2007	Did not enter								Did not enter					
(Qatar) 2011	Did not qualify								2	0	0	2	1	6
(Australia) 2015	Did not qualify								AFC Challenge Cup					
(United Arab Emirates) 2019	Did not qualify								18	5	1	12	24	44
(Qatar) 2023	Did not qualify								11	3	1	7	8	27
(Saudi Arabia) 2027	Did not qualify								To be determined					
Total	–	0/19	–	–	–	–	–	–	45	8	3	34	40	134

=== AFC Challenge Cup ===
Year	AFC Challenge Cup record							Qualifying record					
Year	Result	Pld	W	D*	L	GF	GA	Pld	W	D	L	GF	GA
(Bangladesh) 2006	Ineligible							Ineligible					
(India) 2008	Ineligible							Ineligible					
(Sri Lanka) 2010	Did not qualify							3	2	0	1	9	5
(Nepal) 2012	Group stage	3	1	0	2	2	5	3	2	1	0	6	1
(Maldives) 2014	Third place	5	1	2	2	7	7	Qualified as hosts					
Total	Best: Third place	8	2	2	4	9	12	6	4	1	1	15	6

=== South Asian Football Federation Cup ===
SAFF Championship record
Year	Result	Pld	W	D*	L	GF	GA
(Pakistan) 1993	Did not enter						
(Sri Lanka) 1995	Withdrew						
(Nepal) 1997	Runners-up	4	1	2	1	6	9
(India) 1999	Third place	4	2	1	1	6	4
(Bangladesh) 2003	Runners-up	5	3	1	1	11	4
(Pakistan) 2005	Semi-finals	4	2	1	1	11	2
(Maldives) (Sri Lanka) 2008	Champions	5	4	0	1	8	2
(Bangladesh) 2009	Runners-up	5	3	2	0	11	3
(India) 2011	Semi-finals	4	1	2	1	5	5
(Nepal) 2013	Semi-finals	4	2	1	1	18	3
(India) 2015	Semi-finals	4	2	0	2	9	9
(Bangladesh) 2018	Champions	4	2	1	1	5	3
(Maldives) 2021	Group stage	4	2	0	2	4	4
(India) 2023	Group stage	3	1	0	2	3	4
(Bangladesh) 2026	Group stage	2	0	0	2	0	4
Total	Best: Champions	52	25	11	15	97	56

*Draws include knockout matches decided on penalty kicks.
**Gold background colour indicates that the tournament was won.
***Red border color indicates tournament was held on home soil.

=== Asian Games ===
Asian Games record
Year	Result	Pld	W	D*	L	GF	GA
1951–1994	did not enter						
(Thailand) 1998	–	2	0	0	2	0	7
2002–present	See Maldives under-23 team						
Total	1/13	2	0	0	2	0	7

=== South Asian Games ===
South Asian Games record
Year	Result	Pld	W	D	L	GF	GA
(Nepal) 1984	Third Place	3	1	0	2	1	9
(Bangladesh) 1985	6th	2	0	0	2	1	11
(India) 1987	5th	2	0	0	2	0	6
(Pakistan) 1989	5th	2	0	1	1	3	4
(Sri Lanka) 1991	Runners-up	3	2	0	1	2	2
(Bangladesh) 1993	4th	3	0	2	1	1	3
(India) 1995	5th	2	0	1	1	0	1
(Nepal) 1999	4th	4	2	0	2	8	6
2004–present	See Maldives under-23 team						
Total	8/13	21	5	4	12	16	42

== Honours ==
=== Continental ===
- AFC Challenge Cup
  - (bronze) Third place (1): 2014

=== Regional ===
- SAFF Championship
  - (gold) Champions (2): 2008, 2018
  - (silver) Runners-up (3): 1997, 2003, 2009
  - (bronze) Third place (1): 1999
- South Asian Games
  - (silver) Silver medal (1): 1991
  - (bronze) Bronze medal (1): 1984

=== Summary ===
Only official honours are included, according to FIFA statutes (competitions organized/recognized by FIFA or an affiliated confederation).

Competition	1st place, gold medalist(s)	2nd place, silver medalist(s)	3rd place, bronze medalist(s)	Total
AFC Challenge Cup	0	0	1	1
Total	0	0	1	1

== See also ==
- Maldives women's national football team
- Maldives national under-23 football team
- Maldives national football team results
