= List of Bangladeshi football league top goal scorers =

The following is a list of top scorers in the top-tier football league of Bangladesh.

== Scorers ==
Season	Player	Club	Goals	Source
1973	(Bangladesh) Kazi Salahuddin	Dhaka Abahani	24	
1974	(Bangladesh) Golam Shahid Neelu	Dilkusha SC	16	
1975	(Bangladesh) AKM Nowsheruzzaman	Mohammedan SC	21	
1976	(Bangladesh) Hafizuddin Ahmed	Mohammedan SC	13	
1976	(Bangladesh) Mohammad Abdul Halim	PWD SC	13	
1977	(Bangladesh) Kazi Salahuddin	Dhaka Abahani	14	
1978	(Bangladesh) Enayetur Rahman Khan	Mohammedan SC	13	
1979	(Bangladesh) Kazi Salahuddin	Dhaka Abahani	14	
1980	(Bangladesh) Kazi Salahuddin	Dhaka Abahani	15	
1981	(Bangladesh) Mohammed Mohsin	Brothers Union	20	
1982	(Bangladesh) Abdus Salam Murshedy	Mohammedan SC	27	
1983	(Bangladesh) Arif Abdul Khalek	Brothers Union	14	
1984	(Bangladesh) Sheikh Mohammad Aslam	Dhaka Abahani	17	
1985	(Bangladesh) Sheikh Mohammad Aslam	Dhaka Abahani	18	
1986	(Bangladesh) Sheikh Mohammad Aslam	Dhaka Abahani	20	
1987	(Bangladesh) Sheikh Mohammad Aslam	Dhaka Abahani	14	
1988–89	(Iran) Bijan Taheri	Mohammedan SC	24	
1989–90	(Bangladesh) Sheikh Mohammad Aslam	Dhaka Abahani	11	
1991–92	(Uzbekistan) Azamat Abduraimov	Mohammedan SC	17	
1993	(Russia) Oleg Zhivotnikov	Mohammedan SC	13	
1994	(Russia) Andrey Kazakov	Mohammedan SC	11	
1995	(Bangladesh) Imtiaz Ahmed Nakib	Muktijoddha Sangsad KC	12	
1996	(Bangladesh) Imtiaz Ahmed Nakib	Muktijoddha Sangsad KC	13	
1997–98	(Bangladesh) Imtiaz Ahmed Nakib	Muktijoddha Sangsad KC	13	
1999	(Bangladesh) Imtiaz Ahmed Nakib	Muktijoddha Sangsad KC	12	
2000	(Ghana) Kennedy	Dhaka Abahani	17	
2001	(Nigeria) Emeka Ochilifu	Muktijoddha Sangsad KC	10	
2001	(Bangladesh) Rezaul Karim Liton	Arambagh KS	10	
2002	(Nigeria) Colly Barnes	Dhaka Abahani	12	
2003–04	(Cameroon) Etigo	Mohammedan SC	16	
2005	(Russia) Victor Edwards	Brothers Union	11	
2007	(Nigeria) Elijah Obagbemiro Junior	Brothers Union	16	
2008–09	(Nigeria) Alamu Bukola Olalekan	Mohammedan SC	18	
2009–10	(Bangladesh) Enamul Haque	Dhaka Abahani	21	
2010	(South Sudan) James Moga	Muktijoddha Sangsad KC	19	
2011–12	(Guinea) Ismael Bangoura	Team BJMC	17	
2012–13	(Ghana) Osei Morrison	Mohammedan SC	12	
2013–14	(Haiti) Wedson Anselme	Sheikh Jamal DC	26	
2014–15	(Nigeria) Emeka Darlington	Sheikh Jamal DC	19	
2015–16	(Nigeria) Sunday Chizoba	Dhaka Abahani	19	
2017–18	(The Gambia) Solomon King Kanform	Sheikh Jamal DC	15	
2017–18	(Nigeria) Raphael Odovin Onwrebe	Sheikh Jamal DC	15	
2018–19	(Nigeria) Raphael Odovin Onwrebe	Sheikh Russel KC	22	
2019–20	League abanadoned			
2020–21	(Brazil) Robson Robinho	Bashundhara Kings	21	
2021–22	(Mali) Souleymane Diabate	Mohammedan SC	21	
2022–23	(Brazil) Dori	Bashundhara Kings	20	
2023–24	(Saint Vincent and the Grenadines) Cornelius Stewart	Abahani Limited Dhaka	19	
2024–25	(Ghana) Samuel Boateng	Rahmatganj MFS	21	
2025–26	(Brazil) Dori	Bashundhara Kings	19	
