= Abul Hossain (footballer) =

Bangladeshi footballer

Personal information
- Full name: Mohammed Abul Hossain
- Date of birth: 2 July 1957 (age 69)
- Place of birth: Chandpur, East Bengal, Pakistan (present-day Bangladesh)
- Height: 1.73 m (5 ft 8 in)
- Position: Right-back

Senior career*
Years	Team	Apps	(Gls)
1975–1978	Azad SC		
1978–1993	Mohammedan SC		

International career
1977–1978	Bangladesh U19		
1978–1987	Bangladesh		

Managerial career
- 1995–2002: Mohammedan SC (assistant)
- 1998: Mohammedan SC (interim)
- 2002–2004: Mohammedan SC
- * Club domestic league appearances and goals

Abul Hossain (Bengali: আবুল হোসেন; born 2 July 1957) is a retired Bangladeshi football player and coach.

== Early life ==
Born in Chandpur, East Bengal, Abul was the ninth oldest among eleven siblings. He played both football and basketball at inter-school and district level. He trialed for Azad Sporting Club in Dhaka, and after impressing coaches Ranjit Das and Anjam Hossain, he joined the club both as a basketball and football player.

== Club career ==
Abul represented Azad Sporting Club in the Dhaka First Division Football League from 1975 to 1978.

He represented Mohammedan SC from 1979 until his retirement in 1993. During his tenure with the Black and Whites, he became known for his long-throws, and helped the club win six First Division titles. Notably, he captained the team in 1982, leading them to a domestic double and victory in Comilla's Rakibuddin Gold Cup. Earlier that year, he was part of the Mohammedan team that won the Ashis-Jabbar Shield Tournament under the captaincy of Badal Roy, becoming the first Bangladeshi club to win a trophy on foreign soil. He was also part of the team that reached the semi-final league round of the 1988–89 Asian Club Championship under coach Nasser Hejazi, where they defeated both Iran's Persepolis and North Korea's April 25.

== International career ==
Abul represented the Bangladesh U19 team during both the 1977 and 1978 editions of the AFC Youth Championship.

He made his debut for the team at the 1978 Asian Games held in Bangkok, Thailand. He was also part of the team at the 1980 AFC Asian Cup held in Kuwait. Abul was appointed vice-captain for the 1982 Asian Games held in New Delhi, India and captained the team during a 2–1 victory over Malaysia in the absence of original captain Abdul Motaleb. He captained the team at the 1983 Merdeka Tournament in Malaysia. He also represented the national team at the 1981, 1982, 1983 and 1987 editions of the President's Gold Cup in Dhaka.

== Coaching career ==
In 1995, Abul completed coaching training in Sri Lanka and later became the assistant coach of Mohammedan SC. In 1998, Abul was appointed interim coach of Mohammedan, following the mid-season departure of Samir Shaker. He guided the club to a runners-up finish in the 1997–98 Dhaka Premier Division League. In 2002, he succeeded Pakir Ali as the club's head coach and, in the same year, led the team to a domestic treble by winning the 2002 Dhaka Premier Division League, 2001–02 National League and the 2002 Federation Cup title. In 2003, his team finished runners-up in the National League, losing the final to Muktijoddha Sangsad KC at the Sher-e-Bangla National Stadium in front of 45,000 sepctators. He stepped down from his position in 2004 and relocated to the United States with his family.

== Personal life ==
Abul's son, Abid Hossain, is a professional footballer who played for Mohammedan SC.

== Honours ==
=== Player ===
Mohammedan SC

- Dhaka First Division/Premier Division League: 1980, 1982, 1986, 1987, 1988–89, 1993
- Federation Cup: 1980, 1981, 1982, 1983, 1987, 1989
- Independence Cup: 1991
- DMFA Cup: 1984, 1993
- Ma-O-Moni Gold Cup: 1990
- Ashis-Jabbar Shield Tournament: 1982
- Rakibuddin Gold Cup: 1982

=== Manager ===
- Dhaka Premier Division League: 2002
- National League: 2001–02
- Federation Cup: 2002
