= Arman Mia =

Bangladeshi footballer

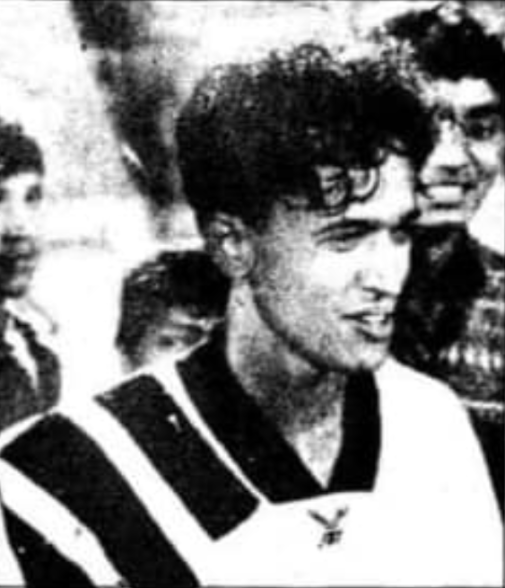
- Arman with Mohammedan SC in 1995

Personal information
- Full name: Mohammed Arman Mia
- Date of birth: 10 October 1977 (age 49)
- Place of birth: Dhaka, Bangladesh
- Height: 1.69 m (5 ft 6 1/2 in)
- Position: Attacking midfielder

Senior career*
Years	Team	Apps	(Gls)
1988–1993	Eskaton SS		
1993–1994	Mohammedan SC		
1994–1995	Muktijoddha Sangsad		
1995–1998	Mohammedan SC		
1998–2002	Dhaka Abahani		
2002–2003	Muktijoddha Sangsad		
2003–2004	Brothers Union		
2004–2008	Muktijoddha Sangsad		

International career
1992	Bangladesh U16		
1994	Bangladesh U19		
2002	Bangladesh U23 (OA)	3	(0)
1993–2006	Bangladesh	33	(2)
1993–1993	Bangladesh B	3	(1)
Medal record
Representing Bangladesh
Men's football
South Asian Games
Silver medal – second place	1995 Madras
SAFF Championship
Winner	2003 Bangladesh
Runner-up	2005 Pakistan
- * Club domestic league appearances and goals

Arman Mia (Bengali: আরমান মিয়া; born 10 October 1977) is a retired Bangladeshi professional footballer who played as an attacking midfielder. He played for the Bangladesh national team from 1993 to 2006.

== International career ==
Arman was part of the 2003 SAFF Cup winning Bangladesh team and was named as the best midfielder of the tournament.

== Career statistics ==
=== International ===
Appearances and goals by national team and year
National team	Year	Apps	Goals
Bangladesh
Bangladesh	1993	3	0
Bangladesh	1995	7	0
Bangladesh	1997	7	1
Bangladesh	1998	1	0
Bangladesh	2003	8	0
Bangladesh	2005	4	0
Bangladesh	2006	3	1
Bangladesh	Total	33	2

Scores and results list Bangladesh's goal tally first.

List of international goals scored by Arman Mia
No.	Date	Venue	Opponent	Score	Result	Competition
1.	31 August 1997	Thuwunna Stadium, Yangon, Myanmar	Myanmar	2–1	2–2	Friendly
2.	16 August 2006	M. A. Aziz Stadium, Chittagong, Bangladesh	Qatar	1–1	1–4	2007 AFC Asian Cup qualification

== Honours ==
Eskaton Sabuj Sangha

- Dhaka Second Division League: 1989–90
- Dhaka Third Division League: 1988–89

Mohammedan Sporting

- Dhaka Premier Division League: 1993, 1996
- DMFA Cup: 1993, 1995
- Federation Cup: 1995

Muktijoddha Sangsad

- National Football League: 2003
- Federation Cup: 2001, 2003
- Dhaka Premier Division League: 1997–98
- McDowell Cup: 1998

Abahani Limited Dhaka

- Dhaka Premier Division League: 2001
- National Football League: 2000
- Federation Cup: 1999

Brothers Union

- Dhaka Premier Division League: 2003–04
- National Football League: 2004

Bangladesh

- South Asian Games Silver medal: 1995
- SAFF Championship: 2003
- 4-nation Tiger Trophy: 1995
