= Mohamed Masoud Rana =

Bangladeshi footballer

Masoud Rana
Personal information
- Full name: Mohamed Masoud Rana
- Date of birth: 1 January 1972 (age 54)
- Place of birth: Sirajganj, Bangladesh
- Height: 1.74 m (5 ft 8 1/2 in)
- Positions: Left-back; centre midfielder

Youth career
- 1986–1990: BKSP

Senior career*
Years	Team	Apps	(Gls)
1990–1994	Dhaka Abahani		
1994–2000	Muktijoddha Sangsad		
2000–2003	Mohammedan SC		
2003–2004	Dhaka Abahani		
2004–2010	Brothers Union		

International career
1992	Bangladesh U19		
1991	Bangladesh U23	8	(1)
1991–1999	Bangladesh	38	(0)
Medal record
Representing Bangladesh
South Asian Games
Bronze medal – third place	1991 Colombo
Silver medal – second place	1995 Madras
Gold medal – first place	1999 Kathmandu
- * Club domestic league appearances and goals

Mohamed Masoud Rana (Bengali: মোহাম্মদ মাসুদ রানা; born 1 January 1972) is a retired Bangladeshi professional footballer who played as a left back or as a centre midfielder.

== Early career ==
In 1986, Masoud participated in the Ershad Gold Cup football tournament representing Sirajganj District. He was later included in a camp arranged by the National Sports Council in Dhaka, which consisted of the best 60 players in the tournament. Masoud eventually gained admission to Bangladesh Krira Shikkha Protishtan (BKSP) on 10 March 1986 following a successful training camp. He participated in many international tournaments in India, Malaysia and Brunei playing as a left back for BKSP. In 1988, he won the Under-16 Youth Gold Cup in Dhaka, where BKSP were competed against different divisional teams. He later partook in the Ma-O-Moni Gold Cup as a guest player for Dhaka Abahani.

== Club career ==
Masoud, who initially joined Dhaka Abahani as a guest player at the Ma-O-Moni Gold Cup in Chittagong, soon became a regular starter and was integral in the club's 1991 BTC Club Cup triumph the following year, before contractually joining the club. He won the Dhaka Premier League title in his first full season at the club in 1992. Initially joining as a binding player, Masoud was supposed to play for Abahani without remuneration for two seasons; however, after impressing during his debut year, he was awarded Taka 2.5 lakh through the recommendation of club official Salman F Rahman.

Nonetheless, due to the gentleman's agreement among Brothers Union, Mohammedan and Abahani to lower player wages, Masoud was one of the 11 players signed by Muktijoddha Sangsad KC in 1994. He won the Dhaka Premier League in both 1997–98 and 2000 with Muktijoddha, while in his first season he won the 1994 Federation Cup, the club's first major title. He also represented the Freedom Fighters at the 1999–2000 Asian Club Championship over two legs against Mohun Bagan. In 2001, he joined Mohammedan SC where he would win the 2002 National League, 2002 Dhaka Premier League and Federation Cup, the latter two as captain.

In December 2004, Masoud joined Brothers Union and won the domestic double, as Brothers were crowned both Dhaka Premier League and Federation Cup champions in 2005. Masoud also represented the Oranges during both the 2005 AFC Cup and 2006 AFC Cup. He remained with Brothers for the 2007 B.League, the inaugural edition of the country's first professional league and eventually retired following 2009–10 Bangladesh League.

== International career ==
Masoud was a member of the first Olympic national team and participated in the 1992 Summer Olympic qualifiers. During the qualifiers, he scored the team's first ever goal, coming in a 2−3 defeat to Thailand U23. In 1992, Masoud captained the Bangladesh U19 team during the 1992 AFC Youth Championship qualifiers held in Kerala, India. Maosud was handed his Bangladesh national team debut the previous year, during the 1991 South Asian Games, where he would win bronze.

During the 4-nation Tiger Trophy held in Myanmar, coach Otto Pfister would use Masoud as a central midfielder, as Bangladesh went on to win their first international trophy. He initially decided to quit the national team after Iraqi coach Samir Shaker kept him on the bench for the entirety of the 1999 South Asian Football Federation Gold Cup in Goa, India. Nonetheless, after being convinced by BFF official and former national player, Badal Roy, Masoud returned to the team for the 1999 Bangabandhu Cup, and was named man of the match in their 1–0 victory over Malaysia U23.

Samir Shaker included Masoud in 1999 South Asian Games bound national team, and started him during both group-stage matches against Sri Lanka and Maldives. However, due to picking up a suspension he missed the semi-final victory over India and was eventually benched for the final as Bangladesh won gold by defeating hosts Nepal 1–0, after which Masoud officially retired from international duty.

== Personal life ==
Masoud was political science student at Dhaka University and also captained its football team at the Sher-e-Bangla Cup in 1996.

== Career statistics ==
=== International ===
Appearances and goals by national team and year
National team	Year	Apps	Goals
Bangladesh
Bangladesh	1991	1	0
Bangladesh	1992	2	0
Bangladesh	1993	12	0
Bangladesh	1994	2	0
Bangladesh	1995	9	0
Bangladesh	1997	9	0
Bangladesh	1998	1	0
Bangladesh	1999	2	0
Bangladesh	Total	38	0

== Honours ==
Abahani Limited Dhaka

- Dhaka First Division League: 1992
- BTC Club Cup: 1991

Muktijoddha Sangsad KC

- Dhaka Premier Division League: 1997–98, 2000
- Federation Cup: 1994
- Mahanagari Cup: 1997
- McDowell's Cup: 1998

Mohammedan SC

- Dhaka Premier Division League: 2002
- Federation Cup: 2002
- National League: 2002

Brothers Union

- Dhaka Premier Division League: 2005
- Federation Cup: 2005

Bangladesh

- South Asian Games Gold medal: 1995, 1999; Bronze medal: 1991
- 4-nation Tiger Trophy: 1995

== Bibliography ==
- Dulal, Mahmud (2020). খেলার মাঠে মুক্তিযুদ্ধ (transl. Liberation war in the playground) (in Bengali). Bishhoshahitto Bhobon. ISBN 978-984-8218-31-0.
- Alam, Masud (2017). ফুটবলের গল্প ফুটবলারদের গল্প (transl. The story of football the story of footballers) (in Bengali). Bishhoshahitto Bhobon. ISBN 9789849134688.
