= List of Bangladesh international footballers =

The Bangladesh national football team has represented Bangladesh in international association football since 1973. The Bangladesh Football Federation (BFF) was founded in 1972 and became a member of the Fédération Internationale de Football Association (FIFA) and Asian Football Confederation (AFC) in 1973 and 1976, respectively. The team played its first official international match on 27 July 1973, registering a 2–2 draw against Thailand in the 1973 Merdeka Tournament.

== Players ==
Key
	Internationally active
Bold	Domestically active
‡	Incomplete statistics

As of match played 14 November 2026

Bangladesh national team footballers with at least 30 appearances
No.	Name	Caps	Goals	Date of debut	Debut against	Date of last match	Last match against	Ref.
1	**Jamal Bhuyan**	99	1	31 August 2013	Nepal	14 November 2026	Pakistan
2	**Sohel Rana**	83	1	2 March 2013	Palestine	1 October 2025	Indonesia
3	**Topu Barman**	70	8	24 October 2014	Sri Lanka	5 June 2026	San Marino
4	Rajani Kanta Barman	68	0	31 August 1997	Myanmar	18 December 2009	Sri Lanka
5	Mamunul Islam	67	3	5 May 2008	Afghanistan	23 January 2020	Burundi
6	Zahid Hasan Ameli	64	15	8 December 2005	Bhutan	10 October 2016	Bhutan
7	Alfaz Ahmed	62	12	25 March 1995	Pakistan	13 November 2008	Indonesia
8	Kaiser Hamid	59	5	18 September 1984	Bhutan	22 December 1993	Nepal
9	Aminul Haque	56	0	31 July 1998	Qatar	20 February 2010	Sri Lanka
10	**Rakib Hossain**	55	7	19 January 2019	Sri Lanka	14 November 2026	Pakistan
11	Hassan Al-Mamun	54	0	1 November 1995	Sri Lanka	18 November 2008	Myanmar
11	**Md Saad Uddin**	54	2	4 September 2018	Bhutan	11 November 2026	Sri Lanka
13	Sheikh Mohammad Aslam	51	14	12 December 1978	Malaysia	14 December 1993	Myanmar
14	Motiur Rahman Munna	50	2	31 July 1998	Qatar	30 April 2009	Macau
15	Waly Faisal	48	0	5 April 2006	Palestine	10 October 2018	Palestine
15	**Bishwanath Ghosh**	48	0	4 September 2018	Bhutan	14 November 2026	Pakistan
17	Khandoker Wasim Iqbal	47	8	16 February 1982	Nepal	17 March 1989	Iran
18	**Mohammad Ibrahim**	45	5	1 October 2018	Laos	14 November 2026	Pakistan
19	**Tariq Kazi**	44	2	3 June 2021	Afghanistan	14 November 2026	Pakistan
20	**Rahmat Mia**	43	0	27 March 2017	Laos	14 November 2026	Pakistan
21	Ashraf Uddin Ahmed Chunnu ‡	41	17	2 August 1975	Thailand	4 May 1985	North Korea
21	Imtiaz Sultan Johnny ‡	41	0	20 November 1982	India	26 September 1990	Japan
21	Monem Munna	41	2	15 March 1986	Pakistan	31 March 1997	Malaysia
24	Ashish Bhadra	40	5	12 December 1978	Malaysia	12 February 1988	Thailand
24	Mohammed Jewel Rana	40	4	24 December 1991	Pakistan	4 October 1999	Nepal
26	Kazi Nazrul Islam ‡	39	0	27 September 1999	Maldives	13 November 2009	Indonesia
27	Mohamed Mohsin ‡	38	0	22 November 1982	China	14 September 1994	India
27	Masoud Rana	38	0	24 December 1991	Pakistan	29 September 1999	Sri Lanka
29	Khurshid Alam Babul ‡	37	0	18 December 1976	Malaysia	25 November 1987	Pakistan
30	Mohammed Sujan	36	3	12 January 2001	Nepal	4 March 2013	Bosnia and Herzegovina
30	Mohamed Zahid Hossain	36	6	6 September 2005	Sri Lanka	8 January 2016	Qatar
30	Atiqur Rahman Meshu	36	2	24 August 2007	Kyrgyzstan	10 October 2016	Bhutan
30	**Biplu Ahmed**	36	3	27 March 2018	Laos	27 September 2022	Nepal
30	**Foysal Ahmed Fahim**	36	1	13 November 2021	Maldives	14 November 2026	Pakistan
35	Nasirul Islam Nasir	35	0	26 April 2009	Tajikistan	2 June 2016	Cambodia
36	Satyajit Das Rupu ‡	34	1	15 March 1986	Pakistan	31 March 1995	India
36	Raihan Hasan	34	0	6 March 2013	Malaysia	14 June 2022	Northern Mariana Islands
38	Mamun Joarder	33	7	24 September 1990	Japan	31 March 1997	Malaysia
38	Arman Mia	33	2	10 December 1993	Myanmar	16 August 2006	Qatar
40	**Yeasin Khan**	32	2	5 March 2014	Seychelles	10 November 2021	India
40	**Nabib Newaj Jibon**	32	5	13 October 2015	Mongolia	29 March 2022	Kyrgyzstan
42	Firoj Mahmud Titu ‡	31	2	21 November 1999	Uzbekistan	24 August 2007	Kyrgyzstan
42	Mahbubur Rahman Sufil	31	5	27 March 2018	Malaysia	14 June 2022	Laos
44	Mehedi Hasan Ujjal	30	0	15 January 2003	Bhutan	25 March 2011	Philippines
44	Arman Aziz	30	0	10 December 2005	Nepal	6 December 2009	Pakistan
44	Mohammed Ariful Islam	30	0	6 September 2006	Tajikistan	2 June 2016	Qatar
44	**Anisur Rahman Zico**	30	0	13 November 2020	Afghanistan	3 September 2023	Nepal

== See also ==
- List of Bangladesh national football team managers
