= Rakib Hossain (footballer, born 1973) =

Bangladeshi footballer

Personal information
- Full name: Mohammed Rakib Hossain
- Date of birth: 10 March 1973 (age 53)
- Place of birth: Shariatpur, Bangladesh
- Height: 1.70 m (5 ft 7 in)
- Position: Left winger

Youth career
- 1986: City Club

Senior career*
Years	Team	Apps	(Gls)
1987–1989	City Club		
1989–1993	PWD SC		
1993	Brothers Union		
1994–1995	Muktijoddha Sangsad		
1995	East Bengal		
1996–1997	Dhaka Abahani		
1997–1998	Muktijoddha Sangsad		
1999–2001	Mohammedan SC		
2002–2003	Muktijoddha Sangsad		
2003–2004	Dhaka Abahani		

International career
1993–1999	Bangladesh	28	(2)
Medal record
Representing Bangladesh
South Asian Games
Silver medal – second place	1995
SAFF Championship
Runner-up	1995
- * Club domestic league appearances and goals

Rakib Hossain (Bengali: রকিব হোসেন; born 10 March 1973), also called Rokib Hossain, is a retired Bangladeshi footballer who played as a left winger.

== Early life ==
Rakib Hossain was born on 10 March, 1973, in Shariatpur District, Bangladesh, to Abdul Khalek Howlader and Begum Sayedunnesa. He was the seventh eldest among eleven siblings, comprising five brothers and six sisters. Growing up, he idolized players like Monir Hossain Manu. In 1986, Rakib moved to Dhaka to pursue his dream of becoming a footballer. While studying at Kakoli High School & College, he began his football journey by playing in the Pioneer League for the junior team of MSPCC City Club. Impressing coach, Shahiduddin Ahmed Selim, he was promoted to the senior team, and played in the Second Division for two years. In 1989, he joined the First Division club PWD SC.

== Club career ==
Following two seasons at PWD SC, Rakib joined Brothers Union, a move facilitated by Brothers' coach, Shahiduddin Ahmed Selim. During his lone season at the club, Brothers finished in third-place with Rakib scoring four league goals. In 1994, following the gentlemen's agreement made by Brothers Union, Mohammedan SC and Dhaka Abahani to lower player salaries, Rakib joined Muktijoddha Sangsad KC and in his debut season at the club he won the Federation Cup.

In 1995, Rakib was named Sports Writers Association's Best Footballer for his performances at both club and international level. In the same year, he represented Calcutta-based East Bengal Club, and during his time in India he played in both the Federation Cup and IFA Shield, winning the latter. In the IFA Shield semi-final match against Mohun Bagan on 6 February 1995, Rakib scored the game's only goal to hand East Bengal a victory in the Kolkata Derby. He eventually returned to Bangladesh, and represented Dhaka Abahani in the 1995 Premier Division League. In the 1997–98 season, Rakib helped Muktijoddha Sangsad win both his and their inaugural Premier Division League title and also the Mahanagari Cup, finishing the latter as top-scorer and the lone scorer of the final against Mohammedan.

Rakib joined Mohammedan and won the 1999 Premier Division League. He also represented the team in the 2000 National League, and finished the tournament as joint top-scorer with three goals. He also played as a guest player for Muktijoddha in the 2001–02 Asian Club Championship. In the 2003–04 season, Rakib captained Dhaka Abahani, and aside from the Premier Division he also led the club during the 2004 National League. However, after suffering a groin injury mid-season, he was stripped of the captaincy by club official Ashrafuddin Ahmed Chunnu. Rakib retired after representing Abahani in the Bhutan King's Cup in October 2004.

== International career ==
Rakib represented Bangladesh Green (B team) at the 1993 President's Gold Cup in Dhaka. In the same year, coach Oldrich Svab, handed him his Bangladesh national team debut against Myanmar in a friendly match prior to the 1993 South Asian Games held on home soil. In 1994, he was part of the Muktijoddha Sangsad KC team coached by Kazi Salahuddin, which represented the Bangladesh national team at the Qatar Independence Cup.

In 1995, Rakib represented Bangladesh during both the 1995 SAARC Gold Cup and 1995 South Asian Games, winning silver in the latter. Rakib scored his first senior international goal on 27 March 1995, against Nepal in the South Asian Gold Cup. He also scored against Nepal in the South Asian Games on 23 December. Rakib was also part of Otto Pfister's Bangladesh team which won their maiden international title, the 4-nation Tiger Trophy in Myanmar.

In 1997, he played five 1998 FIFA World Cup qualification – AFC first round matches and also featured for the team during their disastrous 1997 SAFF Gold Cup campaign. He retired from international football following Bangladesh's defeat to India in the 1999 SAFF Gold Cup final. Although, Rakib was selected in the squad for the 1999 South Asian Games, he decided against participating in the tournament which Bangladesh would finally go on to win.

== Personal life ==
Rakib married Jihan Sazed in 2004, and they have two sons. He is a Dhaka Abahani supporter.

In 2004, he moved to Canada following a fall-out with Abahani club officials which led to his retirement. He returned once in 2006 and served as the sports secretary of Bangladesh Awami Swechasebak League for four months.

== Career statistics ==
=== International ===
Appearances and goals by national team and year
National team	Year	Apps	Goals
Bangladesh
Bangladesh	1993	4	0
Bangladesh	1994	2	0
Bangladesh	1995	10	2
Bangladesh	1997	8	0
Bangladesh	1998	4	0
Bangladesh	Total	28	2

Scores and results list Bangladesh's goal tally first.

List of international goals scored by Rakib Hossain
No.	Date	Venue	Opponent	Score	Result	Competition	Ref.
1	27 March 1995	Sugathadasa Stadium, Colombo, Sri Lanka	Nepal	2–0	2–0	1995 SAARC Gold Cup	
2	23 December 1995	Jawaharlal Nehru Stadium, Madras, India	Nepal	1–0	2–0	1995 South Asian Games	

== Honours ==
Mohammedan SC

- Dhaka Premier Division League: 1999

Muktijoddha Sangsad KC

- Dhaka Premier Division League: 1997–98
- National League: 2003
- Federation Cup: 1994
- Mahanagari Cup: 1997

East Bengal Club

- IFA Shield: 1995

Bangladesh

- South Asian Games Silver medal: 1995
- 4-nation Tiger Cup: 1995

=== Awards and accolades ===
- 1995 − Sports Writers Association's Best Footballer Award
