= Hassan Al-Mamun =

Bangladeshi footballer

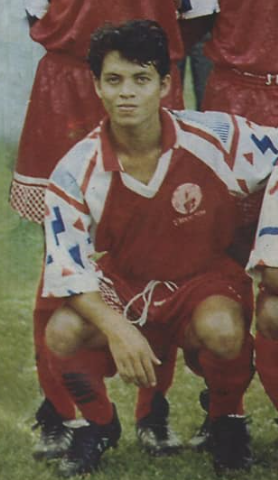
- Mamun with Muktijoddha Sangsad in 1997

Personal information
- Full name: Mohammed Hassan Al-Mamun
- Date of birth: 16 November 1974 (age 51)
- Place of birth: Mymensingh, Bangladesh
- Height: 1.69 m (5 ft 7 in)
- Positions: Full-back; center-back

Youth career
- 1988–1992: BKSP

Senior career*
Years	Team	Apps	(Gls)
1991–1993	BJMC		
1993–1995	Fakirerpool		
1995–1996	Dhaka Abahani		
1997–2008	Muktijoddha		
2009–2012	Mohammedan		(2)
2012–2013	Sheikh Jamal		
2013–2014	Sheikh Russel		(0)
2015	Mohammedan		
2016	Chittagong Abahani		

International career
1996	Bangladesh U19	6	(1)
1995–2008	Bangladesh	54	(0)

Managerial career
- 2016: Chittagong Abahani (assistant)
- 2020–2021: Sheikh Jamal (assistant)
- 2022–2026: Bangladesh (assistant)
- 2025: Bangladesh U23 (assistant)
Medal record
Representing Bangladesh
Men's football
South Asian Games
Silver medal – second place	1995 Madras
Gold medal – first place	1999 Kathmandu
SAFF Championship
Winner	2003 Bangladesh
- * Club domestic league appearances and goals

Hassan Al-Mamun (Bengali: হাসান আল-মামুন; born 16 November 1974) is a Bangladeshi former professional footballer who played as a defender. He was mainly deployed as a full back who could play on both sides of the field. He represented the Bangladesh national team from 1995 to 2008 and made 54 official international appearances for the country. He last worked as an assistant coach for the national team under Thomas Dooley.

== Club career ==
Mamun began his career with Team BJMC in 1991, while he was still in tenth grade. He then went on to join Fakirerpool Young Men's Club, who were known for developing talented young players during the early 90s, but Mamun established himself as one of the best defenders in the country during his time at Dhaka Abahani. He won the Premier Division with Abahani before joining Muktijoddha Sangsad KC in 1996.

Mamun spent most of his career captaining Muktijoddha Sangsad, his time at the club lasted for eleven years, during which he won the 2003 National Football League and the Federation Cup in both 2001 and 2003, while his greatest achievements were the Premier Division League triumphs in 1997–98 and 2000.

In 2008, Mamun was under controversy after stating in an interview that according to him the government does not care about football and the club officials should be imprisoned for destroying the country's football. His statements lead to 8 professional league teams from Dhaka sign an agreement to not sign the defender for the upcoming B.League season. However, Mamun soon gave another interview in which he said that the journalists misquoted him. He also said that most players alongside him had not been paid for the previous three years.

== International career ==
Mamun made his debut for the Bangladesh national team during their 1995 4-nation Tiger Trophy triumph in Myanmar. This was the country's first ever trophy and Mamun was one of the six new faces integrated into the team by head coach Otto Pfister. In 1996, he captained the Bangladesh U19 team at the 1996 AFC Youth Championship held in Seoul, South Korea. Mamun also scored the opening goal during the qualifiers against Maldives U19 in a 5–0 victory. The following few year saw Mamun establish a regular position in the national team, winning gold in the 1999 South Asian Games along the way. Mamun was also a part of team which won the 2003 SAFF Gold Cup. He played all six matches during the tournament. Anwar Parvez and Mamun's full-back partnership is seen as one of the main reasons Bangladesh won the trophy, as the team played with two strikers and no wingers during the tournament knockout stage. However, during the final against Maldives, with captain Rajani Kanta Barman suspended Mamun played as a centre back while also wearing the captaincy armband. In 2007, Mamun captained Bangladesh over two legs against Tajikistan during the 2010 FIFA World Cup qualification – AFC first round.

== Coaching career ==
Mamun started his coaching career as the assistant coach of Chittagong Abahani. He was later appointed as the assistant coach of Sheikh Jamal Dhanmondi Club in 2021, under Mosharraf Hossain Badal.

On 9 March 2022, Mamun was named Javier Cabrera's assistant coach in the Bangladesh national team.

== Career statistics ==
=== International ===
Appearances and goals by national team and year
National team	Year	Apps	Goals
Bangladesh
Bangladesh	1995	4	0
Bangladesh	1997	9	0
Bangladesh	1998	1	0
Bangladesh	1999	8	0
Bangladesh	2000	1	0
Bangladesh	2001	7	0
Bangladesh	2003	7	0
Bangladesh	2005	7	0
Bangladesh	2006	2	0
Bangladesh	2007	2	0
Bangladesh	2008	6	0
Total		54	0

== Honours ==
Fakirerpool Young Men's Club

- Dhaka First Division League: 1993

Abahani Limited Dhaka

- Dhaka Premier Division League: 1995

Muktijoddha Sangsad

- National Football League: 2003
- Federation Cup: 2001, 2003
- Dhaka Premier Division League: 1997–98, 2000
- Mahanagari Cup: 1997
- Independence Day Gold Cup: 2005

Chittagong Abahani

- Independence Cup: 2016

Bangladesh

- SAFF Championship: 2003
- South Asian Games Gold medal: 1999; Silver medal: 1995
- 4-nation Tiger Trophy: 1995
