= Shafiqul Islam Manik =

Bangladeshi association football player and manager

Personal information
- Full name: Shafiqul Islam Manik
- Date of birth: 21 August 1961 (age 65)
- Place of birth: Dhaka, East Pakistan (present-day Bangladesh)
- Position: Right back

Senior career*
Years	Team	Apps	(Gls)
1976–1977	Dhanmondi Club		
1977	Dhaka Wanderers		
1977–1979	Abahani Krira Chakra		
1979–1985	Brothers Union		
1986–1995	Mohammedan SC		

International career
1984	Bangladesh U19		
1982–1989	Bangladesh		
1982	Bangladesh B		

Managerial career
- 1996: Mohammedan SC (assistant)
- 1997–2005: Muktijoddha Sangsad
- 2003: Bangladesh U23
- 2005–2008: Mohammedan SC
- 2008: Bangladesh
- 2009: Bangladesh (assistant)
- 2009: Bangladesh U19
- 2010–2011: Mohammedan SC
- 2011–2014: Muktijoddha Sangsad
- 2015–2016: Chittagong Abahani
- 2016: Sheikh Jamal DC
- 2016–2018: Sheikh Russel KC
- 2018–2021: Sheikh Jamal DC
- 2022–2023: Mohammedan SC
Medal record
Representing Bangladesh
South Asian Games
Silver medal – second place	1984
Silver medal – second place	1985
Silver medal – second place	1989
- * Club domestic league appearances and goals

Shafiqul Islam Manik (Bengali: শফিকুল ইসলাম মানিক; born 21 August 1961) is a Bangladeshi football coach and former national team player. He has both played for and coached the Bangladesh national team.

== Statistics ==
As of 24 February 2023.

Team	From	To	P	W	D	L	GS	GA	%W
Chittagong Abahani	10 August 2015	January 2016	5	4	0	1	12	6	80.00
Sheikh Jamal DC	9 February 2016	19 July 2016	15	6	1	8	28	33	40.00
Sheikh Russel KC	27 August 2016	3 February 2018	44	14	15	15	46	42	31.82
Sheikh Jamal DC	2 May 2019	8 August 2021	40	19	10	11	77	63	47.50
Mohammedan SC	5 June 2022	1 March 2023	24	10	6	8	47	29	41.67

== Honours ==
=== Player ===
Brothers Union

- Aga Khan Gold Cup: 1981–82
- Federation Cup: 1980

Mohammedan SC

- Dhaka First Division/Premier Division League: 1986, 1987, 1988–89, 1993
- Federation Cup: 1987, 1989, 1995
- Independence Cup: 1991
- Ma-O-Moni Gold Cup: 1990
- DMFA Cup: 1993, 1995

Bangladesh

- South Asian Games Silver medal: 1984, 1985, 1989

=== Manager ===
Muktijoddha Sangsad KC

- Dhaka Premier Division League: 1997–98, 2000
- National League: 2003
- Federation Cup: 2001, 2003
- Independence Day Gold Cup: 2005
- Mahanagari Cup: 1997

Mohammedan SC

- National League: 2005–06
