= Zulfiker Mahmud Mintu =

Bangladeshi association football player and manager

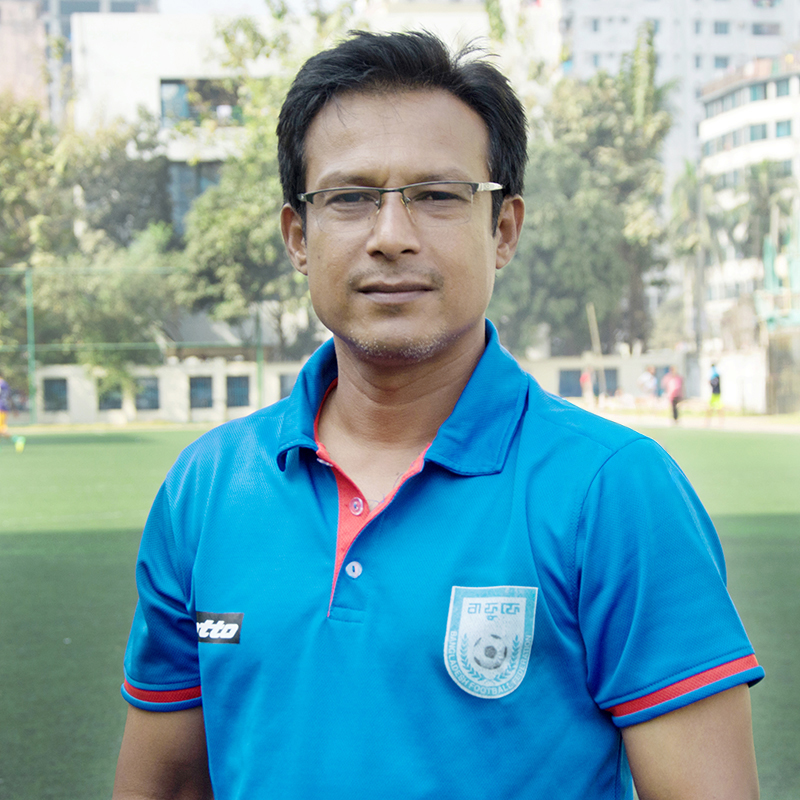
- Mintu in 2016

Personal information
- Full name: Zulfiker Mahmud Mintu
- Date of birth: 9 December 1973 (age 52)
- Place of birth: Noakhali, Bangladesh
- Position: Winger

Youth career
- 1987–88: Badda Jagoroni

Senior career*
Years	Team	Apps	(Gls)
1989–90	Badda Jagoroni		
1990–93	Sadharan Bima		
1994–96	Dhaka Abahani		
1997	Brothers Union		
1998–99	Dhaka Abahani		
2000–01	Muktijoddha Sangsad		
2001–10	Badda Jagoroni		
2001–02	→ Chittagong Abahani (loan)		

International career
1992	Bangladesh U16		
1994	Bangladesh U19		
1998–01	Bangladesh	9	(2)

Managerial career
- 2012–13: Dhaka Abahani (assistant)
- 2013–14: Sheikh Russel KC (assistant)
- 2014: Bangladesh U19 (assistant)
- 2014–15: Sheikh Jamal DC (assistant)
- 2015–16: Bangladesh (assistant)
- 2015–16: Sheikh Russel KC (assistant)
- 2016: Chittagong Abahani (interim)
- 2018–19: Chittagong Abahani
- 2020–21: Saif SC (assistant)
- 2021: Saif SC (interim)
- 2021: Saif SC (assistant)
- 2021: Saif SC
- 2021–22: Sheikh Russel KC (assistant)
- 2022–23: Sheikh Russel KC
- 2023: Bangladesh U23
- 2024: Sheikh Jamal DC
Medal record
Representing Bangladesh
Men's football
South Asian Games
Gold medal – first place	1999 Kathmandu
- * Club domestic league appearances and goals

Zulfiker Mahmud Mintu (Bengali: জুলফিকার মাহমুদ মিন্টু; born 9 December 1973) is a Bangladeshi professional football coach and former player.

== Club career ==
Mintu began his career playing in the Pioneer Football League and Dhaka Third Division League with Badda Jagoroni Sangsad. He initially joined the club through the recommendation of former Fifa referee, Monirul Islam. In 1990, he was signed by First Division outfit Shadharon Bima CSC and made his top-tier debut with them.

In 1994, he joined Abahani Limited Dhaka. Mintu played a pivotal role for Abahani during the club's triumphant 1994 Charms Cup campaign in India, scoring in a 2–0 victory over Kolkata Mohammedan in the final.

In 2008, he captained Badda Jagarani to a semi-finals finish in the Victory Day Football Tournament, where they beat eventual champions, Abahani Limited in the group-stages. He participated in the Senior Division with the club until his retirement in 2010.

== International career ==
Mintu's international career began with taking part in the 1992 AFC U-16 Championship in Saudi Arabia. He later played for the senior national team between 1998 and 2001. He was a member of the 1999 South Asian Games gold medal-winning squad. He scored against both India and Maldives during the 2000 Invitational Football Tournament in Maldives.

== Coaching career ==
In 2012, Mintu obtained both AFC C Diploma and AFC B Diploma on the recommendation of Iranian coach Ardeshir Pournemat Vodehi. In the same year, Mintu worked as an assistant coach at Abahani under Ardeshir. He was the head coach of Saif Sporting Club in 2021.

In March 2022, Mintu was appointed as the head coach of Sheikh Russel KC following the departure of Saiful Bari Titu. He guided the previously relegation-threatened team to a top-half league finish.

In June 2023, Mintu was appointed head coach of the Bangladesh U23 national team for the 2024 AFC U-23 Asian Cup qualifiers. In August 2023, Mintu obtained the AFC Pro-Diploma.

In January 2024, Mintu was appointed as head coach of Sheikh Jamal Dhanmondi Club. In June 2024, he was appointed as head coach of Sheikh Russel KC before the club decided to withdraw from the 2024–25 Bangladesh Premier League, leaving Mintu without a club prior to the season.

== Personal life ==
Mintu was a student of Dhaka University. Unlike many others who decided to marginalise education, Mintu diligently finished his master's degree, while playing domestic football in the Dhaka. After retiring due to a serious injury in 2006, he went for further education taking the FIFA licence for coaching.

== Career statistics ==
=== International ===
Bangladesh
Year	Apps	Goals
2000	3	2
2001	6	0
Total	9	2

Scores and results list Bangladesh's goal tally first.

List of international goals scored by Zulfiker Mahmud Mintu
No.	Date	Venue	Opponent	Score	Result	Competition
1.	2 May 2000	Galolhu Rasmee Dhandu Stadium, Malé, Maldives	India	1–0	1–1	MFF Golden Jubilee Tournament
2.	4 May 2000	Galolhu Rasmee Dhandu Stadium, Malé, Maldives	Maldives	1–0	1–1	MFF Golden Jubilee Tournament

== Managerial statistics ==
As of 5 September 2023

Team	From	To	P	W	D	L	GS	GA	%W
Chittagong Abahani (interim)	21 September 2016	31 December 2016	15	11	2	2	23	8	73.33
Chittagong Abahani	4 January 2018	3 August 2019	38	10	14	14	38	41	26.32
Saif SC (interim)	26 February 2021	8 March 2021	2	2	0	0	8	1	100.00
Saif SC	1 August 2021	14 September 2021	6	5	0	1	13	8	83.33
Sheikh Russel KC	14 March 2022	19 August 2023	45	21	12	12	80	61	46.67
Bangladesh U23	20 June 2023	12 September 2023	3	0	0	3	0	6	0.00
Sheikh Jamal DC	30 January 2024	30 May 2024	14	2	6	6	10	20	14.29

P – Total of played matches W – Won matches D – Drawn matches L – Lost matches GS – Goal scored GA – Goals against
%W – Percentage of matches won

== Honours ==
Abahani Limited Dhaka

- Dhaka Premier Division League: 1994, 1995
- DMFA Cup: 1994
- Charms Cup: 1994
- Federation Cup: 1999

Muktijoddha Sangsad KC

- Dhaka Premier Division League: 2000
- Federation Cup: 2001

Bangladesh

- South Asian Games Gold medal: 1999

Individual

- Dhaka University Blue: 1999
