= Rajani Kanta Barman =

Bangladeshi footballer

Rajani Kanta
Personal information
- Full name: Rajani Kanta Barman
- Date of birth: 12 May 1976 (age 50)
- Place of birth: Gazipur, Bangladesh
- Height: 1.72 m (5 ft 8 in)
- Position: Centre-back

Senior career*
Years	Team	Apps	(Gls)
1994–1996	Agrani Bank SC		
1996–1997	Mohammedan SC		
1997–2004	Muktijoddha Sangsad		
2004	Brothers Union		
2005–2008	Muktijoddha Sangsad		
2008–2009	Mohammedan SC		
2009–2010	Dhaka Abahani		
2010	Muktijoddha Sangsad		
2011–2013	Mohammedan SC		
2013–2016	Sheikh Russel KC		

International career
1997–2009	Bangladesh	68 (Note: Does not include the appearance against India U23 in the 2009 SAFF Championship on 11 December 2009)	(0)
Medal record
Representing Bangladesh
Men's football
South Asian Games
Gold medal – first place	1999
SAFF Championship
Runner-up	1999 India
Winner	2003 Bangladesh
Runner-up	2005 Pakistan
- * Club domestic league appearances and goals

Rajani Kanta Barman (Bengali: রজনী কান্ত বর্মন; born 12 May 1976) is a retired Bangladeshi international footballer who played as a defender for Muktijoddha Sangsad KS. He is former Bangladesh national football team player and has a total of 68 appearances during his 13-year-long international career. He is seen as one of the finest centre backs Bangladesh has produced.

== Club career ==
Rajani started his football career with Agrani Bank Ltd. SC in 1994 and later joined Muktijoddha Sangsad KS in 1999. He spent most of his career with Muktijoddha Sangsad KS, with a total of 12 years with the club, during which he had a 2-year spell with Dhaka Abahani before moving to Mohammedan permanently. He retired during the 2013-2014 season while playing for Sheikh Russel KC.

== International career ==
Rajani represented the national team during the 1999 SAFF Cup. He was the captain of 2003 SAFF Cup winning Bangladesh team. His last appearance for the national side came during a victory against Sri Lanka in the 2009 SAFF Championship. After being a regular member for the Bangladesh team for 10 years, he officially announced his retirement from international football in 2011. His jersey number in the national team was usually number 4.

== Honours ==
Mohammedan Sporting

- Dhaka Premier Division League: 1996
- Bangladesh Super Cup: 2009, 2013

Abahani Limited Dhaka

- Bangladesh Premier League: 2009–10
- Federation Cup: 2010

Muktijoddha Sangsad KS

- Dhaka Premier Division League: 1997–98, 2000
- National League: 2003
- Federation Cup: 2001, 2003

Bangladesh

- SAFF Gold Cup: 2003
- South Asian Games Gold medal: 1999
