= Kazi Nazrul Islam (footballer) =

Bangladeshi footballer

Nazrul Islam
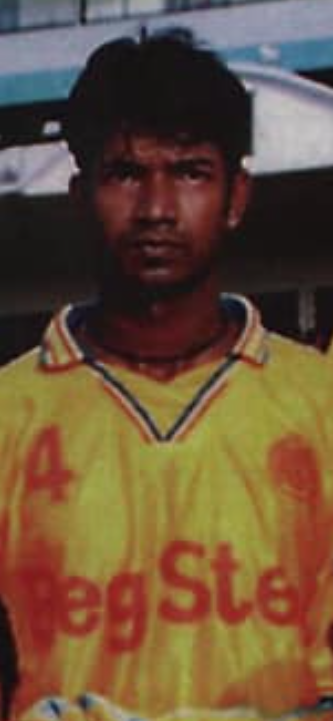
- Nazrul with Dhaka Abahani in 2000

Personal information
- Full name: Kazi Nazrul Islam
- Date of birth: 16 October 1978 (age 48)
- Place of birth: Narayanganj, Bangladesh
- Height: 1.80 m (5 ft 11 in)
- Positions: Centre-back; right-back

Senior career*
Years	Team	Apps	(Gls)
1993–1997	Farashganj SC		
1997–1998	Mohammedan SC		
1999–2000	Farashganj SC		
2000	→ Muktijoddha Sangsad (loan)		
2000–2002	Dhaka Abahani		
2003–2004	Brothers Union		
2005–2006	Mohammedan SC		
2007–2014	Dhaka Abahani		(4)

International career
1996	Bangladesh U19		
2006	Bangladesh U23 (wildcard)		
1998–2008	Bangladesh		
Medal record
Representing Bangladesh
Men's football
South Asian Games
Gold medal – first place	1999 Kathmandu
SAFF Championship
Runner-up	1999 India
Winner	2003 Bangladesh
Runner-up	2005 Pakistan
- * Club domestic league appearances and goals

Kazi Nazrul Islam (Bengali: কাজী নজরুল ইসলাম; born 16 October 1978) is a retired Bangladeshi professional footballer who played as a defender. He played for the Bangladesh national team from 1999 to 2008 and captained the team on multiple occasions. Nazrul worked as a team manager for his former club Abahani Limited Dhaka from 2023 to 2024.

== Club career ==
Nazrul made his Dhaka Premier Division League debut with Farashganj SC in 1993. He transferred to Mohammedan SC in the 1997–98 season and apart from the domestic league he also represented the club at the 1997–98 Asian Club Championship. He spent most of his career with Abahani Limited Dhaka. His first spell with club lasted for two years and after four years away, Nazrul rejoined Abahani in 2007. During his second spell, Nazrul was a mainstay in defense as the club won the Bangladesh Premier League for three years straight, from 2007 till 2010. He was club captain in the 2008-09 season. He was released from the aging squad following the 2012–13 season.

== International career ==
Nazrul represented Bangladesh U19 at the 1996 AFC Youth Championship after playing an important role during qualification. He captained the Bangladesh national team during the 2007 Nehru Cup. He initially retired from international football in 2007 after a fallout with head coach at the time, Syed Nayeemuddin. He returned to the team after Nayeemuddin left only to continue for one more year. During his final international tournament, the 2008 SAFF Championship, coach Abu Yusuf used Nazrul as a backup player despite playing with three central defenders, notably Nazrul was the top performer in the professional league that year.

== Honours ==
Mohammedan

- National League: 2005–06

Abahani Limited Dhaka

- Dhaka Premier Division League: 2001
- Bangladesh Premier League: 2007, 2008-09, 2009-10, 2012
- Federation Cup: 2010
- Super Cup: 2011
- Bordoloi Trophy: 2010

Brothers Union

- Dhaka Premier Division League: 2003–04
- National League: 2004

Bangladesh

- SAFF Championship: 2003
- South Asian Games Gold medal: 1999
