= 2005 Dhaka Premier Division Football League =

Dhaka Premier Division League
- Season: 2005
- Dates: 28 May – 12 September 2005
- Champions: Brothers Union
- Relegated: Dhaka Wanderers; Fakirerpool; Dipali JS
- Matches: 91
- Goals: 280 (3.08 per match)
- Top goalscorer: 11 goals Victor Edwards (Brothers Union)

The 2005 Dhaka Premier Division League, also known as the Premier Bank Dhaka Premier Division League for sponsorship reasons was the 29th season of the top-tier football league in Bangladesh and the final season in which the league served as the country's top division. The league started on 28 May and ended on 12 September 2005.

The top seven teams qualified for the 2007 B.League, the inaugural season of Bangladesh's professional football league. Meanwhile, the bottom three teams, who were originally supposed to participate in the First Division, eventually took part in the merger of the First Division and Premier Division Leagues, which served as the second-tier until 2012.

== Venue ==
The Bangabandhu National Stadium in Dhaka was the sole venue used for the league.

Dhaka	2005 Dhaka Premier Division Football League is located in Bangladesh
Bangabandhu National Stadium	2005 Dhaka Premier Division Football League is located in Bangladesh
Capacity: 36,000	2005 Dhaka Premier Division Football League is located in Bangladesh

== Regular season ==
=== League table ===
Pos	Team	Pld	W	D	L	GF	GA	GD	Pts	Qualification or relegation
1	Brothers Union	18	12	3	3	42	17	+25	39	Qualification for the Championship playoff
2	Mohammedan	18	11	6	1	33	13	+20	39	Qualification for the Championship playoff
3	Dhaka Abahani	18	11	5	2	38	15	+23	38	
4	Muktijoddha Sangsad	18	11	1	6	34	23	+11	34	
5	Sheikh Russel	18	7	6	5	33	18	+15	27	
6	Farashganj	18	6	5	7	18	19	−1	23	
7	Arambagh	18	4	8	6	23	24	−1	20	
8	Dhaka Wanderers	18	2	7	9	18	43	−25	13	Relegation to the 2007–08 Dhaka Senior Division League
9	Fakirerpool	18	3	3	12	20	50	−30	12	Relegation to the 2007–08 Dhaka Senior Division League
10	Dipali JS	18	0	2	16	20	57	−37	2	Relegation to the 2007–08 Dhaka Senior Division League

Source: RSSSF
Rules for classification: 1) Points; 2) Goal difference; 3) Goals scored;

=== Result table ===
No Home \ No Away	BU	MSC	DAL	MKS	SKC	FSC	AKS	DWC	FYMC	DJS
Brothers Union	—	0–0	2–1	1–2	2–2	1–0	2–1	5–0	3–0	2–1
Mohammedan	1–1	—	0–1	1–0	1–0	2–1	3–1	6–1	3–1	4–1
Dhaka Abahani	3–0	1–1	—	0–2	2–0	0–0	0–0	4–1	2–1	3–1
Muktijoddha Sangsad	1–3	0–2	1–2	—	0–4	2–0	4–3	2–1	1–2	2–0
Sheikh Russel	0–2	0–0	1–2	0–0	—	0–1	2–0	3–1	10–0	2–0
Farashganj	2–4	0–1	0–0	2–3	0–1	—	0–0	1–1	2–1	2–1
Arambagh	1–0	2–2	1–1	0–2	2–2	0–0	—	1–3	3–1	4–0
Dhaka Wanderers	1–3	1–1	0–5	1–5	1–1	1–2	0–0	—	1–1	1–1
Fakirerpool	1–4	1–2	1–6	1–3	2–2	0–1	0–2	0–0	—	4–3
Dipali JS	0–7	1–3	3–5	0–3	2–3	1–4	2–2	1–3	2–3	—

Source: RSSSF
Legend: Blue = left column team win; Yellow = draw; Red = top row team win.

== Championship playoff ==
A playoff match was arranged by the Bangladesh Football Federation and the league committee on 12 September 2005, after Mohammedan and Brothers Union tied the final league game 1–1 on 9 September, finishing with equal points, as goal difference was not used to determine positions.

=== Final ===
12 September 2005
17:00 BST

Brothers Union	1–0	Mohammedan
Sujan 22' (pen.)	Report

Bangabandhu National Stadium
Attendance: 10,000
Referee: Mansur Azad (Bangladesh)

GK
LB
RB
CB
CB
CB
MF
MF
MF
CF
CF
Substitutions:
RB
MF
CF
Head coach:
(Bangladesh) Wazed Gazi

(Bangladesh) Mohammed Ali (GK)
(Bangladesh) Masoud Rana	Booked
(Bangladesh) Mohiuddin Ibnul Siraji
(Bangladesh) Jewel Rana	Substituted off
(Bangladesh) Mohammed Sujan (c)	22' (pen.)
(Bangladesh) Amit Khan Shuvro	Booked
(Morocco) Hicham Inani	Booked
(Bangladesh) Pranotosh Kumar Das	Substituted off
(Bangladesh) Abul Hossain
(Russia) Victor Edwards	Booked
(Bangladesh) Zahid Hasan Ameli	Substituted off
(Bangladesh) Jahangir Patwary	Substituted on
(Bangladesh) Rezaul Karim Liton	Substituted on
(Bangladesh) Saiful Islam Khokon	Substituted on

GK	(Bangladesh) Biplob Bhattacharjee (GK)
RB	(Bangladesh) Hassan Al-Mamun
LB	(Bangladesh) Mohammed Rony	Substituted off
CB	(Bangladesh) Kazi Nazrul Islam
CB	(Nigeria) Peter Odaf
MF	(Bangladesh) Motiur Rahman Munna
MF	(Bangladesh) Asadur Rahman Asad	Substituted off
MF	(Bangladesh) Faisal Mahmud	Booked
CF	(Bangladesh) Ashraful Kader Manju	Substituted off
CF	(Bangladesh) Alfaz Ahmed (c)
CF	(Sierra Leone) Donald Robert	Substituted off
Substitutions:
MF	(Bangladesh) Imtiaz Ahmed Nakib	Substituted on
MF	(Bangladesh) Abdul Kayum Sentu	Substituted on
FW	Mohamed Zahid Hossain	Substituted on
Manager:
(Bangladesh) Kazi Jasimuddin Joshi

=== Final table ===
Pos	Team	Qualification
1	Brothers Union (C)	Qualification for the 2005–06 National League
2	Mohammedan	

Source: RSSSF
(C) Champions

== Top scorers ==
Rank	Scorer	Club	Goals
1	(Russia) Victor Edwards	Brothers Union	12
2	(Ghana) Audu Ibrahim	Dhaka Abahani	11
3	(Bangladesh) Shahajuddin Tipu	Dhaka Abahani	10
3	(Bangladesh) Rokonuzzaman Kanchan	Muktijoddha Sangsad	10
3	(Bangladesh) Maksudul Alam Bulbul	Sheikh Russel	10
6	(Bangladesh) Alfaz Ahmed	Mohammedan SC	8
6	(Bangladesh) Ashraful Kader Manju	Mohammedan SC	8
6	(Bangladesh) Rezaul Karim Liton	Brothers Union	8
6	(Bangladesh) Mohamed Hedayetullah Robin	Fakirerpool	8
6	(Nigeria) Paul Nwachukwu	Muktijoddha Sangsad	8
6	(Morocco) Abdel Majid Burjuga	Sheikh Russel	8

== Records ==
- On 2 June 2005, Sheikh Russel KC defeated Fakirerpool YMC 10–0 at the Bangabandhu National Stadium, marking the second-largest margin of victory in the country's top-tier domestic football league, only behind Brothers Union's 15–0 victory over Dilkusha SC in 1984.
