= 2001 Dhaka Premier Division Football League =

Dhaka Premier Division League
- Season: 2001
- Dates: 17 June – 20 September 2001
- Champions: Dhaka Abahani
- Relegated: Agrani Bank; Fakirerpool
- Matches: 78
- Goals: 214 (2.74 per match)
- Top goalscorer: 10 goals Emeka Ochilifu (Muktijoddha Sangsad); Rezaul Karim Liton (Arambagh)

The 2001 Dhaka Premier Division League, also known as the National Bank Dhaka Premier Division League for sponsorship reasons, was the 26th season of the top-tier football league in Bangladesh and the 8th season of the Premier Division, following its succession from the First Division as the top-tier. A total of ten teams participated in the league which began on 17 June and ended on 20 September 2001.

== Venue ==
The Bangabandhu National Stadium in Dhaka was the main venue used for the league.

Dhaka	2001 Dhaka Premier Division Football League is located in Bangladesh
Bangabandhu National Stadium	2001 Dhaka Premier Division Football League is located in Bangladesh
Capacity: 36,000	2001 Dhaka Premier Division Football League is located in Bangladesh

== Regular season ==
Pos	Team	Pld	W	PW	PKL	L	GF	GA	GD	Pts	Qualification
1	Dhaka Abahani	9	7	1	0	1	20	5	+15	23	Qualification for the Championship playoffs
2	Mohammedan	9	5	1	2	1	14	4	+10	19	Qualification for the Championship playoffs
3	Rahmatganj	9	4	2	1	2	12	12	0	17	Qualification for the Championship playoffs
4	Muktijoddha Sangsad	9	3	2	2	2	15	9	+6	15	
5	Brothers Union	9	4	1	1	3	14	10	+4	15	
6	Arambagh	9	4	0	2	3	14	11	+3	14	
7	Dhanmondi Club	9	3	1	3	2	10	14	−4	14	
8	Farashganj	9	3	2	0	4	12	11	+1	13	
9	Agrani Bank	9	0	1	1	7	8	23	−15	3	
10	Fakirerpool	9	0	1	0	8	2	22	−20	2	

Source: RSSSF
Rules for classification: W) 3 points; PW) 2 point; PKL) 1 point, no extra time

== Playoff phase ==
=== Lower seven ===
Pos	Team	Pld	W	PW	PKL	L	GF	GA	GD	Pts	Qualification
1	Muktijoddha Sangsad (Note: Round 14 match awarded loss to both Muktijoddha Sangsad and Dhanmondi Club after both club's failed to show up for their rescheduled fixture on 29 August 2001.)	15	7	3	2	3	29	9	+20	29	
2	Arambagh	15	7	2	2	4	28	20	+8	27	
3	Brothers Union	15	7	2	1	5	27	21	+6	26	
4	Dhanmondi Club	15	5	1	6	3	21	21	0	23	
5	Farashganj	15	3	4	2	6	17	19	−2	19	Qualification for the Relegation playoffs
6	Agrani Bank	15	0	3	2	10	15	40	−25	8	Qualification for the Relegation playoffs
7	Fakirerpool	15	0	1	2	12	5	37	−32	4	Qualification for the Relegation playoffs

Source: RSSSF
Rules for classification: W) 3 points; PW) 2 point; PKL) 1 point, no extra time

=== Relegation playoffs ===
Pos	Team	Pld	W	PW	PKL	L	GF	GA	GD	Pts	Qualification
1	Farashganj	17	3	6	2	6	18	20	−2	23	
2	Agrani Bank (R)	17	1	3	3	10	18	42	−24	12	Relegation to the 2002 Dhaka Premier Division League
3	Fakirerpool (R)	17	0	1	3	13	6	39	−33	5	Relegation to the 2002 Dhaka Premier Division League

Source: RSSSF
Rules for classification: W) 3 points; PW) 2 point; PKL) 1 point, no extra time
(R) Relegated

=== Championship playoffs ===
Pos	Team	Pld	W	PW	PKL	L	GF	GA	GD	Pts
1	Dhaka Abahani (C)	15	13	1	0	1	30	8	+22	41
2	Mohammedan	15	7	2	2	4	20	10	+10	27
3	Rahmatganj	15	4	2	2	7	17	24	−7	18

Source: RSSSF
Rules for classification: W) 3 points; PW) 2 point; PKL) 1 point, no extra time
(C) Champion

== Top scorers ==
Rank	Scorer	Club	Goals
1	(Nigeria) Emeka Ochilifu	Muktijoddha Sangsad	10
1	(Bangladesh) Rezaul Karim Liton	Arambagh	10
3	(Hong Kong) Colly Barnes	Dhaka Abahani	9
3	(Kenya) Okimo Oinu	Arambagh KS	9
5	(Nepal) Basanta Thapa	Brothers Union	6
5	(Bangladesh) Mohammed Polash	Brothers Union	6
5	(Bangladesh) Hanif Pradhan	Dhanmondi Club	6
5	(Bangladesh) Maksudul Alam Bulbul	Dhanmondi Club	6
5	(Bangladesh) Rokonuzzaman Kanchan	Dhaka Abahani	6
5	(Bangladesh) Saifur Rahman Moni	Rahmatganj	6
5	(Bangladesh) Azizur Rahman Sohag	Agrani Bank	6
