= Rezaul Karim Liton =

Bangladeshi footballer

Personal information
- Full name: Rezaul Karim Liton
- Date of birth: 11 December 1980 (age 45)
- Place of birth: Narayanganj, Bangladesh
- Height: 1.68 m (5 ft 6 in)
- Position: Attacking midfielder

Senior career*
Years	Team	Apps	(Gls)
1993–1995	Dhaka Wanderers		
1996–1998	Dhaka Abahani		
1999–2001	Muktijoddha Sangsad		
2001–2002	Arambagh KS		(10)
2002–2003	Dhaka Abahani		
2003–2009	Brothers Union		
2009–2010	Suktara Sangsad		(6)
2010–2011	Arambagh KS		(0)

International career
1996	Bangladesh U16		
2002	Bangladesh U23		
2001	Bangladesh	1	(0)

Managerial career
- 2009: Suktara Sangsad (caretaker)
Medal record
Representing Bangladesh
South Asian Games
Gold medal – first place	1999 Kathmandu
- * Club domestic league appearances and goals

Rezaul Karim Liton (Bengali: রেজাউল করিম লিটন; born 11 December 1980) is a retired Bangladeshi professional footballer who played as an attacking midfielder.

== Club career ==
Liton joined his hometown club Narayanganj Suktara Sangsad after the club secured a place in the 2009–10 Bangladesh League. He initially coached the club to promotion during their Bashundhara Champions Club Cup triumph in 2009, in the absence of head coach, Riaz Biswas.

Our main motivation is that all the players of the squad are from Narayanganj and they know each other closely.

— Liton on the Narayanganj Suktara Sangsad's participation in the professional league in 2009.

He was appointed captain of the team and finished the season as the club's top scorer with six goals, as the Narayanganj-based outfit were relegated in their inaugural season in the country's top-flight.

== International career ==
Liton captained the Bangladesh U16 team during the 1996 AFC U-16 Championship qualifiers in Nagoya, Japan. Under Iraqi coach Samir Shaker, Liton was a member of the Bangladesh national team which won gold at the 1999 South Asian Games. He also participated in the 2002 Asian Games held in South Korea.

== Honours ==
=== Player ===
Abahani Limited Dhaka

- Federation Cup: 1997

Muktijoddha Sangsad KC

- Dhaka Premier Division League: 2000

Brothers Union

- Dhaka Premier Division League: 2003–04, 2005
- Federation Cup: 2005
- Bordoloi Trophy: 2004

Bangladesh

- South Asian Games Gold medal: 1999

Individual

- 2001 − Dhaka Premier Division League Top Scorer (joint)

=== Manager ===
Narayanganj Suktara Sangsad

- Bashundhara Champions Club Cup: 2009
