= 1996 Dhaka Premier Division Football League =

Dhaka Premier Division League
- Season: 1996
- Dates: 12 August – 17 December 1996
- Champions: Mohammedan
- Relegated: East End; Bangladesh Boys
- Asian Club Championship: Mohammedan
- Matches: 90
- Goals: 205 (2.28 per match)
- Top goalscorer: 14 goals Imtiaz Ahmed Nakib (Muktijoddha Sangsad)

The 1996 Dhaka Premier Division League, also known as the Danish Condensed Milk Dhaka Premier League for sponsorship reasons, was the 22nd season of the top-tier football league in Bangladesh and the 4th season of the Premier Division, following its succession from the First Division as the top-tier. A total of ten teams participated in the league which ran from 12 August to 17 December 1996.

== Venue ==
The Shere Bangla National Stadium in Mirpur, Dhaka was the sole venue used for the league.

| Dhaka | 1996 Dhaka Premier Division Football League is located in Bangladesh |
|---|---|
| Shere Bangla National Stadium | 1996 Dhaka Premier Division Football League is located in Bangladesh |
| Capacity: 25,000 | 1996 Dhaka Premier Division Football League is located in Bangladesh |

== League table ==
| Pos | Team | Pld | W | D | L | GF | GA | GD | Pts | Qualification or relegation |
|---|---|---|---|---|---|---|---|---|---|---|
| 1 | Mohammedan (C) | 18 | 15 | 3 | 0 | 36 | 9 | +27 | 48 | Qualification for the 1997–98 Asian Club Championship |
| 2 | Dhaka Abahani | 18 | 13 | 4 | 1 | 36 | 12 | +24 | 43 | |
| 3 | Muktijoddha Sangsad | 18 | 10 | 2 | 6 | 25 | 17 | +8 | 32 | |
| 4 | Brothers Union | 18 | 7 | 5 | 6 | 18 | 14 | +4 | 26 | |
| 5 | Fakirerpool | 18 | 5 | 7 | 6 | 10 | 12 | −2 | 22 | |
| 6 | Farashganj | 18 | 5 | 5 | 8 | 16 | 19 | −3 | 20 | |
| 7 | Agrani Bank | 18 | 4 | 7 | 7 | 20 | 26 | −6 | 19 | |
| 8 | Arambagh | 18 | 5 | 3 | 10 | 15 | 21 | −6 | 18 | |
| 9 | East End (R) | 18 | 3 | 5 | 10 | 18 | 39 | −21 | 14 | Relegation to the 1997–98 First Division League |
| 10 | Bangladesh Boys (R) | 18 | 1 | 3 | 14 | 11 | 36 | −25 | 6 | Relegation to the 1997–98 First Division League |

Source: RSSSF
Rules for classification: 1) Points; 2) Goal difference; 3) Goals scored;
(C) Champions; (R) Relegated

== Top scorers ==
| Rank | Scorer | Club | Goals |
|---|---|---|---|
| 1 | (Bangladesh) Imtiaz Ahmed Nakib | Muktijoddha Sangsad | 14 |
| 2 | (Bangladesh) Mosharaf Hossain Tutul | Agrani Bank | 12 |
| 3 | (Bangladesh) Alfaz Ahmed | Mohammedan | 10 |
| 3 | (Bangladesh) Sourav Majumdar Raju | East End | 10 |
| 5 | (Bangladesh) Mizanur Rahman Mizan | Dhaka Abahani | 8 |
| 6 | (Bangladesh) Rizvi Karim Rumi | Dhaka Abahani | 6 |
| 6 | (Bangladesh) Riyaz Uddin | Muktijoddha Sangsad | 6 |
| 8 | (Bangladesh) Arman Mia | Mohammedan | 5 |
| 8 | (Bangladesh) Rakib Hossain | Dhaka Abahani | 5 |
| 8 | (Bangladesh) Mahabub Hossain Roksy | Arambagh | 5 |
