= Rokonuzzaman Kanchan =

Bangladeshi footballer

Personal information
- Full name: Rokonuzzaman Kanchan
- Date of birth: 22 June 1982 (age 44)
- Place of birth: Sirajdikhan, Bangladesh
- Height: 1.65 m (5 ft 5 in)
- Position: Striker

Senior career*
Years	Team	Apps	(Gls)
1993–1994	Rayer Bazar AC		
1995–1996	Fakirerpool YMC		
1997–1998	Agrani Bank SC		
1999–2000	Farashganj SC		
2000–2001	Dhaka Abahani		
2002	Mohammedan SC		
2003–2014	Muktijoddha Sangsad		
2015	Arambagh KS		
2016	Muktijoddha Sangsad		
2017–2020	Bashundhara Kings	18	(11)
2019	→ Dhaka City (loan)	3	(1)

International career
1998	Bangladesh U16		(1)
2000	Bangladesh U19		
2000–2006	Bangladesh	29	(6)

Managerial career
- 2022: Uttara FC
Medal record
Representing Bangladesh
Men's football
SAFF Championship
Winner	2003 Bangladesh
Runner-up	2005 Pakistan
- * Club domestic league appearances and goals

Rokonuzzaman Kanchan (Bengali: রোকনুজ্জামান কাঞ্চন; born 22 June 1982) is a retired Bangladeshi professional football player and coach. He played for the Bangladesh national team from 2000 to 2010, scoring 6 goals in his 29 games. He last served as head coach for Uttara FC in the Bangladesh Championship League.

== Career statistics ==
=== International goals ===
List of international goals scored by Rokonuzzaman Kanchan
No.	Date	Venue	Opponent	Score	Result	Competition	Ref.
1	12 February 2001	Mohamed bin Fahd Stadium, Dammam, Saudi Arabia	Mongolia	3–0	3–0	2002 FIFA World Cup qualification	
2	15 January 2003	Bangabandhu National Stadium, Dhaka, Bangladesh	Bhutan	3–0	3–0	2003 SAFF Gold Cup	
3	18 January 2003	Bangabandhu National Stadium, Dhaka, Bangladesh	India	1–0	2–1	2003 SAFF Gold Cup	
4	20 January 2003	Bangabandhu National Stadium, Dhaka, Bangladesh	Maldives	1–1	2–1 (a.e.t.) (5–3 p)	2003 SAFF Gold Cup	
5	10 December 2005	People's Football Stadium, Karachi, Pakistan	Nepal	1–0	2–0	2005 SAFF Gold Cup	
6	10 December 2005	People's Football Stadium, Karachi, Pakistan	Nepal	2–0	2–0	2005 SAFF Gold Cup	

== Honours ==
Abahani Limited Dhaka

- National League: 2000
- Federation Cup: 2000

Mohammedan SC

- Dhaka Premier Division League: 2002
- Federation Cup: 2002

Muktijoddha Sangsad KC

- Independence Cup: 2005

Bashundhara Kings

- Bangladesh Championship League: 2017

Bangladesh

- SAFF Championship: 2003

=== Awards and accolades ===
- Sports Writers Association's Best Footballer Award: 2002
