= Samir Shaker =

Iraqi footballer (born 1958)

Personal information
- Full name: Samir Shaker Mahmoud
- Date of birth: 28 February 1958 (age 68)
- Place of birth: Baghdad, Iraq
- Position: Defender

Senior career*
Years	Team	Apps	(Gls)
1976–1977	Al-Jaish		
1977–1984	Salahaddin FC		
1984–1987	Al-Rasheed		
1987–1988	Dhaka Abahani		
1988–1990	Al-Rasheed		

International career
1982–1989	Iraq		

Managerial career
- 1994: Dhaka Abahani
- 1997–1998: Mohammedan SC
- 1998–1999: Bangladesh
- * Club domestic league appearances and goals

Samir Shaker Mahmoud (Arabic: سَمِير شَاكِر مَحْمُود; born 28 February 1958) is an Iraqi former professional footballer who played as defender. He played for the Iraq national team in the 1986 FIFA World Cup. He also played for Al-Rasheed Club.

== Career ==
Samir Shaker was one of the best central defenders during the 1980s. He started his career with Al-Jaish before moving to Salah-Al-Deen of Tikrit, who he captained the club to their first Iraqi league in 1983. After the title win, Samir and fellow team-mate Anad Abid joined the star-studded Baghdad-based club Al-Rasheed helping the club to 3 league titles, 2 cups and a record 3 Arab Championships.

In 1986, in the Arab Club Championship in Tunisia, Samir scored the solitary goal over Esperance of Tunisia helping Al Rasheed to win their second Arab title.

Shaker played for Iraq in the 1986 FIFA World Cup. In a game against Belgium Shaker spat at the referee. He received a one-year suspension never played for his country again.

In 1987, along with teammate Karim Allawi, Shaker joined Bangladeshi club Abahani Krira Chakra. He spent a year at the club, and failed to win the league title during his short stay.

He is one of the most successful coaches to manage the Bangladesh national team having led Bangladesh to the runners-up trophy in the SAFF Football Championships and to the 1999 SAF Games title in Nepal, he also coached his former club Abahani Krira Chakra and, then went onto to coach rival club Mohammedan Sporting Club of Bangladesh.

== See also ==
- List of Bangladesh national football team managers

== Honours ==
Abahani Limited Dhaka

- Dhaka Premier Division League: 1994
- DMFA Cup: 1994

Bangladesh

- South Asian Games Gold medal: 1999
