= Colly Ezeh =

Hong Kong footballer (born 1979)

Personal information
- Full name: Colly Barnes Ezeh
- Date of birth: 10 December 1979 (age 46)
- Place of birth: Lagos, Nigeria
- Height: 1.87 m (6 ft 1 1/2 in)
- Positions: Centre-back; striker

Senior career*
Years	Team	Apps	(Gls)
1998–1999	Sai Kung		
1999–2000	Rangers (HKG)		
2000	Mohun Bagan		
2001	Instant-Dict		
2001	Happy Valley		
2002	Abahani		
2003–2006	Happy Valley	48	(2)
2006–2007	Sun Hei	2	(0)
2007–2008	Shatin		
2008–2009	Mutual	18	(0)
2009	Fukien	1	(0)
2010	Tuen Mun	7	(2)
2010	Shatin	4	(2)
2011	Pontic	11	(0)

International career
2006	Hong Kong	1	(0)
- * Club domestic league appearances and goals

Colly Barnes Ezeh (Chinese: 史提夫, born 10 December 1979), commonly known as Colly or Steve, is a former professional footballer who played as a centre-back or striker. Born in Nigeria, he played for the Hong Kong national team.

== Club career ==
When Ezeh was in Mohun Bagan, he only played in cup matches.

== International career ==
On 15 November 2006, Ezeh made his international debut for Hong Kong in the 2007 AFC Asian Cup qualification match against Bangladesh.

== Career statistics ==
=== International ===
As of 15 November 2006

#	Date	Venue	Opponent	Result	Scored	Competition
1	15 November 2006	Mong Kok Stadium, Hong Kong	Bangladesh	2–0	0	2007 AFC Asian Cup qualification

== Honours ==
Happy Valley

- Hong Kong First Division League: 2005–06

Dhaka Abahani

- Dhaka Premier Division League: 2001

Individual

- Dhaka Premier Division League top scorer: 2002
