= 1995 Dhaka Premier Division Football League =

Dhaka Premier Division League
- Season: 1995
- Dates: 30 June – 1 October 1995
- Champions: Dhaka Abahani
- Relegated: Rahmatganj; Wari Club
- Asian Club Championship: Mohammedan
- Matches: 90
- Goals: 206 (2.29 per match)
- Top goalscorer: 12 goals Imtiaz Ahmed Nakib (Muktijoddha Sangsad)

The 1995 Dhaka Premier Division League, also known as the Lifebuoy Premier League for sponsorship reasons, was the 21st season of the top-tier football league in Bangladesh and the 3rd season of the Premier Division, following its succession from the First Division as the top-tier. A total of ten teams participated in the league which ran from 30 June to 1 October 1995.

== Venue ==
The Dhaka Stadium in Dhaka was the sole venue for the league.

Dhaka	1995 Dhaka Premier Division Football League is located in Bangladesh
Dhaka Stadium	1995 Dhaka Premier Division Football League is located in Bangladesh
Capacity: 36,000	1995 Dhaka Premier Division Football League is located in Bangladesh

== Teams ==
The following ten clubs participated in Dhaka Premier Division League during 1995 season.

Club	Last season	Head coach	Captain
Arambagh	6th	(Bangladesh) Wazed Gazi	(Bangladesh) Mahabub Hossain Roksy
Agrani Bank	7th	(Bangladesh) Abdul Hamid	(Bangladesh) Mohammed Shoriful
Brothers Union	4th	(Bangladesh) Shahiduddin Ahmed Selim	(Bangladesh) Pijush Nandi
Dhaka Abahani	1st	(Russia) Valery Bogdanov	(Bangladesh) Monem Munna
Fakirerpool	8th	(Bangladesh) Kazi Alfatul Haque	(Bangladesh) Monwar Hossain Montu
Farashganj	Promoted	(Bangladesh) Nurul Haque	(Bangladesh) Ratan Kumar
Mohammedan	3rd	(Nigeria) Kadiri Ikhana	(Bangladesh) Nurul Haque Manik
Muktijoddha Sangsad	2nd	(Bangladesh) Shafiqul Islam Manik	(Bangladesh) Saiful Bari Titu
Rahmatganj	Promoted	(Bangladesh) Mohammed Mala	(Bangladesh) Mohammed Nazim
Wari Club	5th	(Bangladesh) A.M. Abdullah Saik	(Bangladesh) Abdur Razzak

=== Coaching changes ===
Team	Outgoing head coach	Manner of departure	Date of vacancy	Position in the table	Incoming head coach	Date of appointment
Mohammedan	(Nigeria) Kadiri Ikhana	Sacked	Unknown	Unknown	(Bangladesh) Abu Yusuf	Unknown

== League table ==
Pos	Team	Pld	W	D	L	GF	GA	GD	Pts	Qualification or relegation
1	Dhaka Abahani (C)	18	13	4	1	29	8	+21	43	
2	Mohammedan	18	13	3	2	35	13	+22	42	Qualification for the 1996–97 Asian Cup Winners' Cup (Note: Qualified as champions of the 1995 Bangladesh Federation Cup)
3	Muktijoddha Sangsad	18	10	3	5	31	16	+15	33	
4	Fakirerpool	18	7	6	5	24	19	+5	27	
5	Arambagh	18	3	11	4	17	18	−1	20	
6	Agrani Bank	18	5	5	8	18	24	−6	20	
7	Farashganj	18	3	8	7	11	19	−8	17	
8	Brothers Union	18	3	7	8	17	23	−6	16	
9	Rahmatganj (R)	18	2	5	11	13	31	−18	11	Relegation to the 1996 First Division League
10	Wari Club (R)	18	1	8	9	11	35	−24	11	Relegation to the 1996 First Division League

Source: RSSSF
Rules for classification: 1) Points; 2) Goal difference; 3) Goals scored;
(C) Champions; (R) Relegated

== Top scorers ==
Rank	Scorer	Club	Goals
1	(Bangladesh) Imtiaz Ahmed Nakib	Muktijoddha Sangsad	12
2	(Bangladesh) Sheikh Mohammad Aslam	Dhaka Abahani	9
2	(Russia) Andrey Kazakov	Mohammedan	9
2	(Bangladesh) Mizanur Rahman Mizan	Brothers Union	9
2	(Bangladesh) Mosharaf Hossain Tutul	Agrani Bank	9
6	(Bangladesh) Shahidul Ahmed Ranjan	Mohammedan	8
