= Monem Munna =

Bangladeshi footballer

Personal information
- Full name: Mohammad Monem Munna
- Date of birth: 9 June 1966
- Place of birth: Narayanganj, East Pakistan (present-day Bangladesh)
- Date of death: 12 February 2005 (aged 38)
- Place of death: Dhaka, Bangladesh
- Height: 1.78 m (5 ft 10 in)
- Position: Central defender

Senior career*
Years	Team	Apps	(Gls)
1982–1983	Shantinagar Club		
1983–1985	Muktijoddha Sangsad		
1986	Brothers Union		
1987–1998	Dhaka Abahani		
1991	East Bengal		
1993	East Bengal		
1995	East Bengal		

International career
1986–1997	Bangladesh		
Medal record
Representing Bangladesh
South Asian Games
Silver medal – second place	1989 Islamabad
Silver medal – second place	1995 Madras
- * Club domestic league appearances and goals

Mohammad Monem Munna (Bengali: মোনেম মুন্না; 9 June 1966 – 12 February 2005) was a Bangladeshi footballer who mainly played as a center back. He is often regarded as the best defender that ever played for Bangladesh. He was well known by his nickname "The King-Back".

== Early life ==
Munna started playing football through his school team, Narayanganj Zilla School, which became the champions in the National School Championship, where he was adjudged the best player. He then played for Sirajuddoullah Club of Narayanganj. He started his career in Dhaka through the Pioneer Division team Gulistan Club in 1981. In 1982, he moved to the second division team of Shantinagar Club.

== Club career ==
Munna came in the limelight at first in 1982 during a match between Narayanganj and the Bangladesh national team. He joined the Muktijoddha Sangsad KC in 1983 and became the second division champion. During these two seasons, 1984–85, Munna displayed extraordinary skill in the first division on behalf of the Muktijoddha Sangsad. In 1986 he moved to Brothers Union for one season. At that time, Abahani officials noticed him because of his great performance for the Brothers. As a result, he joined Abahani Limited Dhaka in 1987. In 1991, Munna received a record fee, 20 lakh taka, for Abahani, which was a unique record for the whole of South Asia at that time. He led Abahani for 1993–1995 as captain and won two consecutive titles in 1993 and 1994.

During 1991 and again in 1993, Munna played for Kolkata's East Bengal Club. On both occasions East Bengal emerged champions in the Calcutta League. Monem Munna was inducted into the East Bengal Club's "Hall of Fame" for his outstanding performance.

Munna later served as the manager (team leader) of Abahani. He earned the Sky Blues premier division league titles both as captain and as manager.

== International career ==
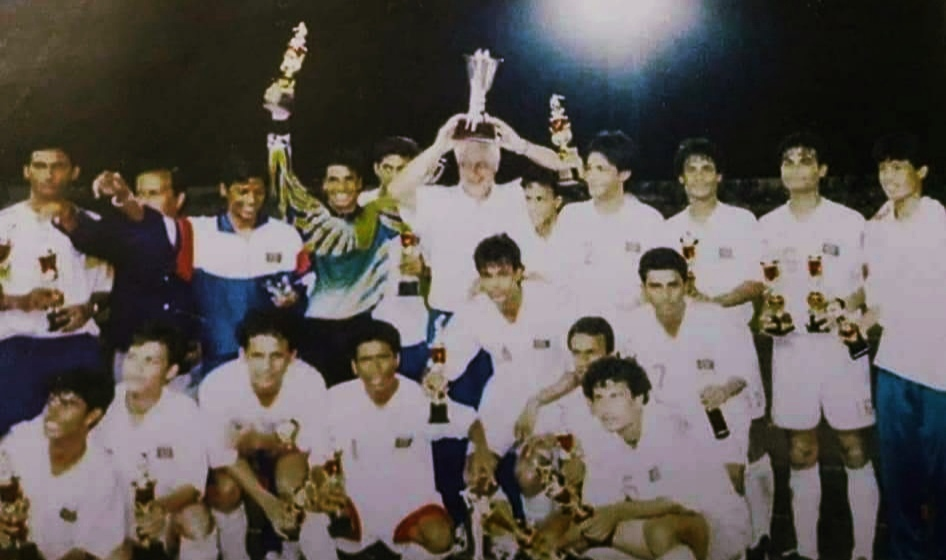
Bangladesh's first international trophy

Munna played for Bangladesh national football team from 1986 until 1997. He served as the captain of the national team three times. In 1995, under his leadership, Bangladesh won the 4-nation Tiger Trophy in Myanmar, the first-ever international trophy won by the country. Bangladesh also became runners-up in 1995 SAFF games, under his captaincy.

== Personal life and health ==
Munna was married to Yasmin Monem Surovi. Together they had one daughter, Eusra Monem Dania and one son, Azman Salid.

Munna left his football career in 1997 due to kidney complications. He died on 12 February 2005. He had had a kidney transplant in March 2000 after both his kidneys were damaged.

== Legacy ==
On 9 June 2008 the Dhanmondi Road No 8 was officially renamed as the "Monem Munna Bridge" as a remembrance of Monem Munna illustrious career on his 42 birthday.

== Career statistics ==
=== International goals ===
Date	Venue	Opponent	Score	Result	Competition	Goals
13 March 1986	Karachi, Pakistan	Iran XI	1–0	Won	1986 President's Gold Cup	1
10 December 1993	Mirpur Stadium, Dhaka, Bangladesh	Myanmar	3–0	Won	International Friendly	2

== Honours ==
Abahani Limited Dhaka

- Dhaka League: 1989–90, 1992, 1994, 1995
- Federation Cup: 1988, 1997
- Independence Cup: 1990
- DMFA Cup: 1994
- Sait Nagjee Trophy: 1989
- Azmiri Begum Gold Cup: 1989
- BTC Club Cup: 1991
- Charms Cup: 1994

East Bengal Club

- Calcutta League: 1991, 1993

Bangladesh

- 4-nation Tiger Trophy: 1995
- South Asian Games Silver medal: 1989, 1995
