= 2002 Dhaka Premier Division Football League =

Dhaka Premier Division League
- Season: 2002
- Dates: 15 July – 24 September 2002
- Champions: Mohammedan
- Relegated: Rahmatganj; Farahsganj
- Matches: 65
- Goals: 163 (2.51 per match)
- Top goalscorer: 12 goals Colly Barnes (Dhaka Abahani)

The 2002 Dhaka Premier Division League, also known as the National Bank Dhaka Premier Division League for sponsorship reasons, was the 27th season of the top-tier football league in Bangladesh and the 9th season of the Premier Division, following its succession from the First Division as the top-tier. A total of ten teams participated in the league which began on 15 July and ended on 24 September 2002.

== Venue ==
The Bangabandhu National Stadium in Dhaka was the main venue used for the league.

| Dhaka | 2002 Dhaka Premier Division Football League is located in Bangladesh |
| Bangabandhu National Stadium | 2002 Dhaka Premier Division Football League is located in Bangladesh |
| Capacity: 36,000 | 2002 Dhaka Premier Division Football League is located in Bangladesh |

== Regular season ==
| Pos | Team | Pld | W | PW | PKL | L | GF | GA | GD | Pts | Qualification |
|---|---|---|---|---|---|---|---|---|---|---|---|
| 1 | Dhaka Abahani | 9 | 7 | 0 | 2 | 0 | 22 | 9 | +13 | 23 | Qualification for the Championship playoffs |
| 2 | Mohammedan | 9 | 7 | 0 | 1 | 1 | 16 | 4 | +12 | 22 | Qualification for the Championship playoffs |
| 3 | Muktijoddha Sangsad | 9 | 5 | 2 | 2 | 0 | 14 | 4 | +10 | 21 | Qualification for the Championship playoffs |
| 4 | Arambagh | 9 | 3 | 2 | 2 | 2 | 14 | 12 | +2 | 15 | Qualification for the Championship playoffs |
| 5 | Dhanmondi Club | 9 | 4 | 1 | 0 | 4 | 12 | 13 | −1 | 14 | Qualification for the Championship playoffs |
| 6 | Badda Jagoroni | 9 | 1 | 3 | 2 | 3 | 8 | 13 | −5 | 11 | Qualification for the Relegation playoffs |
| 7 | Brothers Union | 9 | 2 | 1 | 1 | 5 | 12 | 15 | −3 | 9 | Qualification for the Relegation playoffs |
| 8 | Victoria | 9 | 2 | 1 | 1 | 5 | 10 | 18 | −8 | 9 | Qualification for the Relegation playoffs |
| 9 | Rahmatganj | 9 | 1 | 2 | 1 | 5 | 7 | 17 | −10 | 8 | Qualification for the Relegation playoffs |
| 10 | Farashganj | 9 | 0 | 1 | 1 | 7 | 7 | 17 | −10 | 3 | Qualification for the Relegation playoffs |

Source: RSSSF
Rules for classification: W) 3 points; PW) 2 point; PKL) 1 point, no extra time

== Playoff phase ==
=== Relegation playoffs ===
| Pos | Team | Pld | W | PW | PKL | L | GF | GA | GD | Pts | Qualification |
|---|---|---|---|---|---|---|---|---|---|---|---|
| 1 | Badda Jagoroni | 13 | 2 | 5 | 3 | 3 | 13 | 16 | −3 | 19 | |
| 2 | Brothers Union | 13 | 4 | 1 | 3 | 5 | 14 | 19 | −5 | 17 | |
| 3 | Victoria | 13 | 2 | 5 | 1 | 5 | 14 | 20 | −6 | 17 | |
| 4 | Rahmatganj (R) | 13 | 3 | 1 | 3 | 6 | 14 | 17 | −3 | 14 | Relegation to the 2003–04 Dhaka First Division League |
| 5 | Farashganj (R) | 13 | 0 | 1 | 1 | 11 | 9 | 28 | −19 | 3 | Relegation to the 2003–04 Dhaka First Division League |

Source: RSSSF
Rules for classification: W) 3 points; PW) 2 points; PKL) 1 point, no extra time
(R) Relegated

=== Championship playoffs ===
| Pos | Team | Pld | W | PW | PKL | L | GF | GA | GD | Pts | Qualification |
|---|---|---|---|---|---|---|---|---|---|---|---|
| 1 | Mohammedan (C) | 13 | 10 | 1 | 1 | 1 | 21 | 5 | +16 | 33 | Qualification for the 2003 National League |
| 2 | Dhaka Abahani | 13 | 9 | 1 | 2 | 1 | 30 | 12 | +18 | 31 | |
| 3 | Muktijoddha Sangsad | 13 | 7 | 2 | 4 | 0 | 18 | 6 | +12 | 29 | |
| 4 | Arambagh | 13 | 5 | 1 | 0 | 7 | 15 | 22 | −7 | 17 | Qualification for the 2003 National League |
| 5 | Dhanmondi Club | 13 | 3 | 2 | 2 | 6 | 15 | 18 | −3 | 15 | |

Source: RSSSF
Rules for classification: W) 3 points; PW) 2 point PKL) 1 point, no extra time
(C) Champion

== Top scorers ==
| Rank | Scorer | Club | Goals |
|---|---|---|---|
| 1 | (Hong Kong) Colly Barnes | Dhaka Abahani | 12 |
| 2 | (Nigeria) Emeka Ochilifu | Muktijoddha Sangsad | 9 |
| 3 | (Kenya) Okimo Oinu | Arambagh KS | 7 |
| 3 | (Bangladesh) Imtiaz Ahmed Nakib | Mohammedan | 7 |
| 3 | (Bangladesh) Mehedi Hassan Tapu | Dhanmondi Club | 7 |
| 6 | (Bangladesh) Mujibur Rahman Ritu | Rahmatganj | 6 |
| 7 | (Bangladesh) Rokonuzzaman Kanchan | Mohammedan | 5 |
| 7 | (Bangladesh) Rezaul Karim Liton | Brothers Union | 5 |
| 7 | (Bangladesh) Abul Hossain | Victoria | 5 |
| 10 | (Bangladesh) Maksudul Alam Bulbul | Dhaka Abahani | 4 |
| 10 | (Bangladesh) Donald Ague | Dhaka Abahani | 4 |
| 10 | (Bangladesh) Saiful Islam Khokon | Dhaka Abahani | 4 |
| 10 | (Ghana) Mohammad Salisu | Mohammedan | 4 |
| 10 | (Bangladesh) Shahajuddin Tipu | Rahmatganj | 4 |
| 10 | (Bangladesh) Alfaz Ahmed | Muktijoddha Sangsad | 4 |
| 10 | (Bangladesh) Saiful Islam Saif | Arambagh KS | 4 |
| 10 | (Bangladesh) Ashraful Kader Manju | Dhanmondi Club | 4 |
| 10 | (Bangladesh) Walid Khan | Farashganj SC | 4 |
| 10 | (Bangladesh) Mehedi Hasan Ujjal | Badda Jagoroni | 4 |
