= 1999 Dhaka Premier Division Football League =

Dhaka Premier Division League
- Season: 1999
- Dates: 22 June – 5 November 1999
- Champions: Mohammedan
- Relegated: Fakirerpool; Mirpur Chalantika
- Matches: 81
- Goals: 236 (2.91 per match)
- Top goalscorer: 12 goals Imtiaz Ahmed Nakib (Muktijoddha Sangsad)

The 1999 Dhaka Premier Division League, also known as the Keya Cosmetics Dhaka Premier Division League for sponsorship reasons, was the 24th season of the top-tier football league in Bangladesh and the 6th season of the Premier Division, following its succession from the First Division as the top-tier. A total of ten teams participated in the league which began on 22 June and ended on 5 November 1999.

== Venue ==
The Bangabandhu National Stadium in Dhaka was the main venue used for the league.

Dhaka	1999 Dhaka Premier Division Football League is located in Bangladesh
Bangabandhu National Stadium	1999 Dhaka Premier Division Football League is located in Bangladesh
Capacity: 36,000	1999 Dhaka Premier Division Football League is located in Bangladesh

== Regular season ==
=== League table ===
Pos	Team	Pld	W	D	L	GF	GA	GD	Pts	Qualification or relegation
1	Mohammedan	9	8	1	0	14	2	+12	25	Qualification for the Championship playoffs
2	Muktijoddha Sangsad	9	6	1	2	18	8	+10	19	Qualification for the Championship playoffs
3	Dhaka Abahani	9	5	2	2	13	6	+7	17	Qualification for the Championship playoffs
4	Arambagh	9	4	3	2	14	11	+3	15	Qualification for the Championship playoffs
5	Badda Jagoroni	9	4	2	3	12	10	+2	14	
6	Brothers Union	9	3	1	5	11	11	0	10	
7	Farashganj	9	3	1	5	8	11	−3	10	
8	Rahmatganj	9	1	5	3	8	11	−3	8	
9	Fakirerpool	9	1	3	5	5	15	−10	6	
10	Mirpur Chalantika	9	0	1	8	9	27	−18	1	

Source: RSSSF
Rules for classification: 1) Points; 2) Goal difference; 3) Goals scored;

Result table

No Home / No Away (Single League)	MSC	MKS	DAL	AKS	BJS	BU	FSC	RHS	FYMC	MCS
MSC	—	2–1	2–1	0–0	2–0	1–0	1–0	1–0	3–0	2–0
MKS	1–2	—	1–0	3–2	2–1	1–0	3–1	0–0	3–1	5–0
DAL	1–2	0–1	—	1–1	1–0	1–0	1–0	3–1	0–0	5–1
AKS	0–0	2–3	1–1	—	2–2	2–0	2–0	4–2	1–0	2–1
BJS	0–2	1–2	0–1	2–2	—	2–1	1–0	2–0	1–1	3–1
BU	0–1	0–1	0–1	0–2	1–2	—	2–1	1–1	4–0	3–2
FSC	0–1	1–3	0–1	0–2	0–1	1–2	—	1–1	3–1	3–1
RHS	0–1	0–0	1–3	2–4	0–2	1–1	1–1	—	0–0	1–1
FYMC	0–3	1–3	0–0	0–1	1–1	4–0	1–3	0–0	—	3–2
MCS	0–2	0–5	1–5	1–2	1–3	2–3	1–3	1–1	2–3	—

== Second phase ==
=== Lower six ===
Pos	Team	Pld	W	D	L	GF	GA	GD	Pts	Qualification or relegation
1	Badda Jagoroni	14	5	4	5	19	17	+2	19	
2	Brothers Union	14	5	4	5	16	17	−1	19	
3	Farashganj	14	5	3	6	21	22	−1	18	
4	Rahmatganj	14	3	8	3	21	19	+2	17	Qualification to the Relegation playoffs
5	Fakirerpool	14	3	5	6	17	25	−8	14	Qualification to the Relegation playoffs
6	Mirpur Chalantika	14	0	1	13	16	42	−26	1	Qualification to the Relegation playoffs

Source: RSSSF
Rules for classification: 1) Points; 2) Goal difference; 3) Goals scored;

Results table

No Home / No Away (Single League)	BJS	BU	MCS	FSC	FYMC	RHS
BJS	—	2–2	2–0	1–2	2–2	1–0
BU	2–2	—	4–2	1–5	3–3	1–1
MCS	0–2	1–5	—	3–2	3–5	1–3
FSC	1–2	1–0	2–1	—	2–1	2–2
FYMC	2–2	1–3	5–3	1–2	—	1–1
RHS	2–2	1–1	2–3	2–2	1–1	—

== Playoff phase ==
=== Relegation playoffs ===
Pos	Team	Pld	W	D	L	GF	GA	GD	Pts	Qualification or relegation	RHS	FYMC	MCS
1	Rahmatganj	16	5	8	3	29	23	+6	23		—		5–3
2	Fakirerpool (R)	16	3	5	8	20	31	−11	14	Relegation to the 2000 First Division League	1–3	—	
3	Mirpur Chalantika (R)	16	1	1	14	22	49	−27	4	Relegation to the 2000 First Division League		3–2	—

Source: RSSSF
Rules for classification: 1) Points; 2) Goal difference; 3) Goals scored;
(R) Relegated

=== Championship playoffs ===
Pos	Team	Pld	W	D	L	GF	GA	GD	Pts	Qualification or relegation
1	Mohammedan (C)	18	12	4	2	29	11	+18	40	Qualification for the 2000 National League
2	Dhaka Abahani	18	11	4	3	27	12	+15	37	Qualification for the 2000 National League
3	Muktijoddha Sangsad	18	10	4	4	36	17	+19	34	Qualification for the 2000 National League
4	Arambagh	18	4	3	11	17	37	−20	15	

Source: RSSSF
Rules for classification: 1) Points; 2) Goal difference; 3) Goals scored;
(C) Champions

Results

Round	MSC	MKS	DAL	AKS
Round 1	1–0	0–1	1–1	1–1
Round 2	1–1	1–1	3–1	1–3
Round 3	1–4	4–1	2–0	0–2
Round 4	3–1	1–3	3–1	1–3
Round 5	0–1	3–0	1–0	0–3
Round 6	0–0	0–0	2–0	0–2
Round 7	5–1	0–2	2–0	1–5
Round 8	3–0	5–0	0–3	0–5
Round 9	1–1	1–1	2–0	0–2

== Top scorers ==
Rank	Scorer	Club	Goals
1	(Bangladesh) Imtiaz Ahmed Nakib	Muktijoddha Sangsad	12
2	(Bangladesh) Alfaz Ahmed	Mohammedan	10
3	(Bangladesh) Saiful Islam Khokon	Badda Jagoroni	9
3	(Bangladesh) Mizanur Rahman Mizan	Brothers Union	9
3	(Bangladesh) Murad Ahmed Milon	Rahmatganj	9
6	(India) Syed Sabir Pasha	Dhaka Abahani	8
6	(Bangladesh) Saiful Islam Saif	Rahmatganj	8
8	(Nigeria) Ifeanyi	Muktijoddha Sangsad	7
8	(Bangladesh) Mujibur Rahman Ritu	Arambagh	7
10	(Bangladesh) Zakir Hossain	Dhaka Abahani	6
10	(Bangladesh) Md Sohag	Mirpur Chalantika	6
10	(Bangladesh) Avijit	Fakirerpool	6
