= 2003–04 Dhaka Premier Division Football League =

Dhaka Premier Division League
- Season: 2003–04
- Dates: 17 December 2003 – 12 March 2004
- Champions: Brothers Union
- Relegated: Victoria SC; Badda Jagoroni; Dhanmondi Club
- Matches: 90
- Goals: 220 (2.44 per match)
- Top goalscorer: 16 goals Etigo (Mohammedan)

The 2003–04 Dhaka Premier Division League, also known as the Western Union Dhaka Premier Division League for sponsorship reasons, was the 28th season of the top-tier football league in Bangladesh and the 10th season of the Premier Division, following its succession from the First Division as the top tier. A total of ten teams participated in the league, which began on 17 December 2003 and ended on 12 March 2004.

== Venue ==
The Shere Bangla National Stadium in Mirpur, Dhaka, was the sole venue used for the league.

Dhaka	2003–04 Dhaka Premier Division Football League is located in Bangladesh
Shere Bangla National Stadium	2003–04 Dhaka Premier Division Football League is located in Bangladesh
Capacity: 25,000	2003–04 Dhaka Premier Division Football League is located in Bangladesh

== League table ==
Pos	Team	Pld	W	D	L	GF	GA	GD	Pts	Qualification or relegation
1	Brothers Union (C)	18	12	4	2	44	11	+33	40	Qualification for the 2004 National League
2	Sheikh Russel	18	11	5	2	22	9	+13	38	
3	Dhaka Abahani	18	9	6	3	35	16	+19	33	
4	Muktijoddha Sangsad	18	9	5	4	25	12	+13	32	
5	Mohammedan (Note: Mohammedan were deducted 1 point for abandoning their match against Muktijoddha Sangsad, additionally, their opponents were declared 2–0 winners.)	18	8	8	2	32	8	+24	31	
6	Arambagh	18	7	5	6	17	20	−3	26	
7	Dhaka Wanderers	18	6	4	8	15	27	−12	22	
8	Victoria	18	5	2	11	12	28	−16	17	Relegation to the 2004–05 Dhaka First Division League
9	Badda Jagoroni	18	1	2	15	5	41	−36	5	Relegation to the 2004–05 Dhaka First Division League
10	Dhanmondi Club	18	0	3	15	13	48	−35	3	Relegation to the 2004–05 Dhaka First Division League

Source: RSSSF
Rules for classification: (1) Points; (2) Goal difference; (3) Goals scored;
(C) Champions

== Result table ==
No Home \ No Away	BU	SKC	DAL	MKS	MSC	AKS	DWC	VSC	BJS	DC
Brothers Union	—	2–0	1–2	1–0	0–0	4–2	3–0	4–0	5–0	1–0
Sheikh Russel	1–0	—	2–1	1–2	0–0	0–0	2–1	1–0	1–0	2–1
Dhaka Abahani	3–3	1–1	—	0–0	0–1	1–0	6–1	2–0	0–0	7–3
Muktijoddha Sangsad	0–0	1–2	1–0	—	0–2	2–1	4–1	0–1	3–0	2–2
Mohammedan	1–1	0–0	2–1	0–2	—	3–0	1–1	5–0	4–0	6–0
Arambagh	0–5	0–0	0–0	1–1	0–0	—	1–0	2–0	1–0	2–0
Dhaka Wanderers	0–2	0–2	1–1	0–1	0–0	2–1	—	1–0	1–0	1–0
Victoria	1–4	0–1	0–1	0–0	1–2	1–2	1–1	—	2–1	2–1
Badda Jagoroni	0–1	0–3	0–3	0–4	0–5	0–2	1–2	1–2	—	2–1
Dhanmondi Club	1–7	0–2	1–5	0–2	1–1	1–3	1–2	0–1	0–0	—

Source: RSSSF
Legend: Blue = left column team win; Yellow = draw; Red = top row team win.

== Top scorers ==
Rank	Scorer	Club	Goals
1	(Cameroon) Etigo	Mohammedan	16
2	(Bangladesh) Saiful Islam Khokon	Dhaka Abahani	10
2	(Russia) Victor Edwards	Brothers Union	10
4	(Brazil) Sandro	Dhaka Abahani	8
4	(Uganda) Okelo Okelo	Brothers Union	8
6	(Bangladesh) Ariful Kabir Farhad	Mohammedan SC	7
6	(Bangladesh) Mohammed Asif	Sheikh Russel KC	7
8	(Bangladesh) Alfaz Ahmed	Brothers Union	6
8	(Uganda) Kaseriya Idris	Victoria SC	6
10	(Russia) Maxim Olkhovic	Dhaka Abahani	5
10	(Liberia) Arcadia Toe	Muktijoddha Sangsad	5
10	(Morocco) Quati Younnes	Sheikh Russel KC	5
10	(Bangladesh) Mohammed Yusuf	Dhaka Wanderers	5

== Controversies ==
=== Dhaka Abahani vs. Muktijoddha Sangsad; 12 January 2004 ===
On 12 January 2004, a heated 0–0 draw between Dhaka Abahani and Muktijoddha Sangsad KC saw controversy when referee Tayeb Hassan mistakenly awarded a goal from Abahani striker Maxim Olkovic's free kick, which had only brushed the side netting. Muktijoddha players protested, and midfielder Mohammed Tushar was sent off for kicking the referee. After an eight-minute delay, Hassan revoked the decision following consultation with assistant referee Abdul Hannan, leading to another ten-minute delay as officials tried to convince Abahani players. Tensions escalated when Abahani was denied a penalty late in the game. After the final whistle, Abahani players and officials, led by manager Monem Munna, confronted the referee, who was shielded by police. The unrest extended outside the Sher-e-Bangla National Stadium, where a microbus belonging to ATN Bangla was damaged, forcing police to use tear gas to disperse the furious crowd.

=== Mohammedan vs. Muktijoddha Sangsad; 15 January 2004 ===
- On 15 January 2004, the match between Mohammedan and Muktijoddha Sangsad was abandoned after Mohammedan walked off in protest against Muktijoddha's equalizer, leaving the score at 1–1 after 84 minutes. The dispute arose when referee Ram Krishna Ghosh allowed a goal from Belal Ahmed's long throw-in, which allegedly deflected off Mohammedan defender Amit Khan Shuvro into the net. Mohammedan claimed Shuvro was beyond the goal line when the ball touched him and argued the goal should be disallowed as it came directly from a throw-in. Captain Jewel Rana led the protests, at one point dragging linesman Shahadat Badal off balance and threatening to slap him. The situation escalated when an NTV camera crew entered the field and showed footage of the incident to Mohammedan officials. Ghosh upheld his decision and waited the regulation 40 minutes before abandoning the match. The incident was also observed by AFC and FIFA delegates, who were in Dhaka for the Vision Asia project and attended the match at Sher-e-Bangla National Stadium.
- On 17 January, during a press briefing at the Mohammedan club premises, general secretary Lokman Hossain Bhuiyan demanded full three points from the abandoned match against Muktijoddha and called for foreign referees in domestic football. On 19 January, the Dhaka Mahanagari Football League Committee (DMFLC) awarded Muktijoddha a 2–0 victory and three points while deducting one point from Mohammedan for refusing to play the final six minutes. Mohammedan captain Jewel Rana also received a one-match ban for his conduct toward match officials.
- On 20 January, round nine matches between Sheikh Russel KC vs. Badda Jagoroni and Brothers Union vs. Dhanmondi Club were postponed due to rioting by nearly a hundred Mohammedan supporters. The rioters stormed Sher-e-Bangla National Stadium, set fire to advertising boards, lifted goalposts, tore nets, broke flagpoles, and blocked players from entering. In the evening, they attacked the referees' office at Maulana Bhasani Stadium. DMFLC secretary Mozammel Hoque Mukta also criticized the police's inaction. Additionally, Mohammedan officials vowed to boycott the league unless their appeals were reconsidered. In a letter to DMFLC, they demanded video review of the goal, punishment for referee Ram Krishna Ghosh, and for the match to resume from where it stopped. Signed by general secretary Lokman Hossain Bhuiyan, the letter warned that the club wouldn't be responsible for any unrest if the disciplinary measures weren't reconsidered.
- On 21 January, DMFLC suspended the Premier Division League until 24 January after referees refused to officiate without assured security. The Referees Association, in a letter to DMFLC, protested the attack on their office at Maulana Bhasani Stadium by Mohammedan supporters on 20 January. Meanwhile, top Premier Division clubs strongly opposed the suspension, citing financial distress. On 22 January, Mohammedan general secretary Lokman Hossain Bhuiyan met with BFF president SA Sultan and general secretary Anwarul Haque Helal at Bangabandhu National Stadium. On 24 January, an emergency meeting led to Mohammedan agreeing to rejoin the league after captain Jewel Rana's ban was revoked, though their point deduction remained. The league resumed on 26 January.
