= Football at the 1995 South Asian Games =

Tournament details
- Teams: 6 (from 1 confederation)
- Venue(s): 1

Final positions
- Champions: India (3rd title)
- Runners-up: Bangladesh
- Third place: Sri Lanka

Men's football took place at the 1995 South Asian Games. India won their third title by defeating Bangladesh in the final by 1–0.

== Teams ==
India

Bangladesh

Sri Lanka

Maldives

Pakistan (withdrew)

Nepal

== Group stage ==
Group A

(Q) qualified for Semi-finals.

Pakistan withdrew

Pos.	Team	Pld	W	D	L	GF	GA	GD	Pts
1	India (Q)	1	1	0	0	1	0	+1	2
2	Sri Lanka (Q)	1	0	0	1	0	1	-1	0

Matches

23 December 1995

India	1–0	Sri Lanka
Vijayan	Report

Jawaharlal Nehru Stadium, Madras

Group B

(Q) qualified for Semi-finals

Pos.	Team	Pld	W	D	L	GF	GA	GD	Pts
1	Bangladesh (Q)	2	1	1	0	2	1	+1	3
2	Nepal (Q)	2	1	0	1	1	0	+1	2
3	Maldives	2	0	1	1	0	1	-1	1

Matches

19 December 1995

Nepal	1–0	Maldives
	Report

Jawaharlal Nehru Stadium, Madras

21 December 1995

Maldives	0–0	Bangladesh
	Report

Jawaharlal Nehru Stadium, Madras

23 December 1995

Bangladesh	2–1	Nepal
Rakib 16'; Mamun 26'	Report	Mani Shah 51'

Jawaharlal Nehru Stadium, Madras

== Semi-final Matches ==
25 December 1995

Bangladesh	0–0	Sri Lanka
	Report
Penalties
	4–3

Jawaharlal Nehru Stadium, Madras

25 December 1995

India	3–0	Nepal
Vijayan; Carlton	Report

Jawaharlal Nehru Stadium, Madras

== Medal matches ==
=== Bronze medal match ===
27 December 1995

Sri Lanka	0–0	Nepal
	Report
Penalties
	5–3

Jawaharlal Nehru Stadium, Madras

=== Gold match ===
27 December 1995

India	1–0	Bangladesh
Sabir	Report

Jawaharlal Nehru Stadium, Madras

== Winners ==
Football at the 1995 South Asian Games

India
Third title
