= National Bank (Bangladesh) =

Bank in Bangladesh

National Bank PLC https://nblbd.com/ New Logo of National Bank PLC
- Type: Public Limited Company
- Industry: Bank
- Headquarters: 116/1, Kazi Nazrul Islam Avenue, Banglamotor, Dhaka, Bangladesh
- Key people: Melita Mahjabeen (Chairman) Mohammad Abu Jafar (Managing Director)
- Website: nblbd.com

National Bank PLC (Bengali: ন্যাশনাল ব্যাংক লিমিটেড) is a privately held limited bank in Bangladesh.

Currently NBL has carrying their business through its 221 branches & 65 Sub-Branches spread all over the country.

== History ==
National Bank PLC is the first private sector bank fully owned by Bangladeshi nationals. The bank was opened on 28 March 1983 but the first branch at 48, Dilkusha Commercial Area, Dhaka started commercial operation on 23 March 1983. The second branch was opened on 11 May 1983 at Khatungonj, Chittagong. Long-standing connection with the national economy. The bank celebrated its 43rd anniversary in April 2026, marking more than four decades of operation.

National Bank PLC currently reports:

- 221 branches
- 65 sub-branches
- 2,556 NGO/ASA outlets for remittance distribution
- Extensive presence across Bangladesh

Its branch network extends from major commercial centres to rural and regional markets.

== Building a Stronger Nation, Together ==
Entrepreneurs → SME & startup financing

Farmers → agricultural finance

Women → Nari Jagaran financing

Workers abroad → remittance

Families → retail banking

Students → education and financial inclusion

Communities → CSR

Merchants → Bangla QR and digital payments

Businesses → corporate and trade banking

A connected economy → international banking and remittance

A digital future → technology transformation

== One of its strongest assets: Remittance ==
The bank considers remittance one of its main focuses and business interests.

National Bank entered the remittance business in 1985 and describes itself as a pioneer among Bangladesh's remittance-procuring banks. It has maintained relationships with international exchange houses for decades.

The bank has also highlighted its early partnership with Western Union for facilitating foreign remittance into Bangladesh.

Today, its remittance ecosystem includes:

- 221 branches
- 65 sub-branches
- 2,556 ASA outlets
- bKash as an MFS partner
- NPSB
- Q-Cash
- BEFTN
- RTGS
- international exchange-house relationships
- automated/API-based remittance processing

In 2024, National Bank PLC was recognized as the second-highest receiver of remittances sent from the USA to Bangladesh at the Bangladesh Remittance Fair in the United States. The Daily Star independently reported the recognition.

The bank also received the Remittance Award 2024 from the Ministry of Expatriates' Welfare and Overseas Employment for its contribution to remittance collection during FY 2023-24.

The Center for NRB also recognized the bank among the Top Ten Banks for remittance collection in 2024.

=== Board of directors ===
Professor Dr. Melita Mehjabeen became Chairman with immediate effect following the 539th Board meeting on 28 February 2026. She is an academic and finance specialist and is also an independent director of Grameenphone, British American Tobacco Bangladesh and Unilever Consumer Care.

Tabith Awal was recently appointed as a Director and also serves as Chairman of the Executive Committee. He has previously served on National Bank's board and has experience across banking, insurance, real estate, energy, agriculture, textiles and IT.

Nazneen Ahmad was appointed as a Director by Bangladesh Bank. She has more than two decades of business experience, particularly in garments, chemicals and packaging.

Md. Akhter Hossain is the newest independent director listed on the board. He brings more than 37 years of banking and financial-sector experience, including senior roles at EXIM Bank, Shahjalal Islami Bank and Mercantile Bank.

Mohammad Abu Jafar is currently serving as Managing Director. He is a veteran banker with 36 years of professional experience in the banking industry in diverse capacities for business development spanning mainly over readymade garment (RMG) financing, offshore banking, corporate banking, treasury business & operations, credit management, foreign trade financing international business, and branch banking.

Name	Position	Reference
Professor Dr. Melita Mehjabeen	Chairman	https://www.nblbd.com/about-us/bod?
Moazzam Hossain	Vice Chairman	
Mohammad Abu Jafar	Managing Director	https://www.nblbd.com/about-us/bod?
Tabith Awal	Director	
Nazneen Ahmad	Director	
Md. Zulkar Nayn	Independent Director	
Muklesur Rahman	Independent Director	
Md. Abdus Satter Sarkar, FCMA, FCA	Independent Director	
Md. Akhter Hossain	Independent Director	
