= 2004 National Football League (Bangladesh) =

Edition of the Football League

Statistics of the 2004 National Football League (Bangladesh).

== Overview ==
Brothers Union won the championship.

== Playoff ==
=== Semifinals ===
- Muktijoddha SKC 2-0 Mohammedan SC
- Brothers Union 2-1 Abahani Ltd

=== Third place ===
- Abahani Ltd 3-2 Mohammedan SC

=== Final ===
- Muktijoddha SKC 0-0 (pen 2–4) Brothers Union

Brothers Union won the championship.
