= 2000 Dhaka Premier Division Football League =

Dhaka Premier Division League
- Season: 2000
- Dates: 1 September – 30 November 2000
- Champions: Muktijoddha Sangsad
- Relegated: Badda Jagoroni; Victoria
- Asian Club Championship: Muktijoddha Sangsad
- Matches: 93
- Goals: 236 (2.54 per match)
- Top goalscorer: 17 goals Kennedy (Dhaka Abahani)

The 2000 Dhaka Premier Division League, also known as the National Bank Dhaka Premier Division League for sponsorship reasons, was the 25th season of the top-tier football league in Bangladesh and the 7th season of the Premier Division, following its succession from the First Division as the top-tier. A total of ten teams participated in the league which began on 1 September and ended on 30 November 2000.

== Venue ==
The Bangabandhu National Stadium in Dhaka was the main venue used for the league.

| Dhaka | 2000 Dhaka Premier Division Football League is located in Bangladesh |
| Bangabandhu National Stadium | 2000 Dhaka Premier Division Football League is located in Bangladesh |
| Capacity: 36,000 | 2000 Dhaka Premier Division Football League is located in Bangladesh |

== Regular season ==
| Pos | Team | Pld | W | PW | PKL | L | GF | GA | GD | Pts | Qualification |
|---|---|---|---|---|---|---|---|---|---|---|---|
| 1 | Muktijoddha Sangsad | 9 | 7 | 1 | 1 | 0 | 17 | 2 | +15 | 24 | Qualification for the Championship section |
| 2 | Mohammedan | 9 | 7 | 1 | 0 | 1 | 20 | 4 | +16 | 23 | Qualification for the Championship section |
| 3 | Dhaka Abahani | 9 | 6 | 0 | 1 | 2 | 18 | 5 | +13 | 19 | Qualification for the Championship section |
| 4 | Rahmatganj | 9 | 4 | 1 | 0 | 4 | 9 | 10 | −1 | 14 | Qualification for the Championship section |
| 5 | Dhanmondi Club | 9 | 2 | 2 | 2 | 3 | 10 | 16 | −6 | 12 | |
| 6 | Farashganj | 9 | 2 | 1 | 3 | 3 | 8 | 12 | −4 | 11 | |
| 7 | Arambagh | 9 | 2 | 2 | 1 | 4 | 5 | 11 | −6 | 11 | |
| 8 | Brothers Union | 9 | 2 | 1 | 2 | 4 | 4 | 10 | −6 | 10 | |
| 9 | Badda Jagoroni | 9 | 3 | 0 | 0 | 6 | 7 | 9 | −2 | 9 | |
| 10 | Victoria | 9 | 0 | 1 | 0 | 8 | 8 | 27 | −19 | 2 | |

Source: RSSSF
Rules for classification: W) 3 points; PW) 2 point; PKL) 1 point, no extra time

== Second phase ==
=== Lower six ===
| Pos | Team | Pld | W | PW | PKL | L | GF | GA | GD | Pts | Qualification |
|---|---|---|---|---|---|---|---|---|---|---|---|
| 1 | Arambagh | 14 | 5 | 3 | 2 | 4 | 19 | 20 | −1 | 23 | |
| 2 | Dhanmondi Club | 14 | 5 | 2 | 3 | 4 | 20 | 23 | −3 | 22 | |
| 3 | Farashganj | 14 | 4 | 3 | 3 | 4 | 18 | 18 | 0 | 21 | |
| 4 | Brothers Union | 14 | 5 | 1 | 3 | 5 | 16 | 19 | −3 | 20 | Qualification for the Relegation playoffs |
| 5 | Badda Jagoroni | 14 | 4 | 0 | 0 | 10 | 15 | 19 | −4 | 12 | Qualification for the Relegation playoffs |
| 6 | Victoria | 14 | 0 | 1 | 0 | 13 | 15 | 47 | −32 | 2 | Qualification for the Relegation playoffs |

Source: RSSSF
Rules for classification: W) 3 points; PW) 2 point; PKL) 1 point, no extra time

=== Championship section ===
| Pos | Team | Pld | W | PW | PKL | L | GF | GA | GD | Pts | Qualification |
|---|---|---|---|---|---|---|---|---|---|---|---|
| 1 | Muktijoddha Sangsad | 15 | 9 | 3 | 2 | 1 | 23 | 6 | +17 | 35 | Qualification for the Championship playoffs |
| 2 | Dhaka Abahani | 15 | 10 | 1 | 1 | 3 | 40 | 13 | +27 | 33 | Qualification for the Championship playoffs |
| 3 | Mohammedan | 15 | 10 | 1 | 1 | 3 | 33 | 15 | +18 | 33 | Qualification for the Championship playoffs |
| 4 | Rahmatganj | 15 | 4 | 1 | 1 | 9 | 13 | 32 | −19 | 15 | |

Source: RSSSF
Rules for classification: W) 3 points; PW) 2 point; PKL) 1 point, no extra time

== Playoff phase ==
=== Relegation playoffs ===
| Pos | Team | Pld | W | PW | PKL | L | GF | GA | GD | Pts | Qualification |
|---|---|---|---|---|---|---|---|---|---|---|---|
| 1 | Brothers Union | 16 | 6 | 1 | 3 | 6 | 21 | 28 | −7 | 23 | |
| 2 | Badda Jagoroni (R) | 16 | 5 | 0 | 0 | 11 | 22 | 22 | 0 | 15 | Relegation to the 2001 Dhaka First Division League |
| 3 | Victoria (R) | 16 | 1 | 1 | 0 | 14 | 20 | 52 | −32 | 5 | Relegation to the 2001 Dhaka First Division League |

Source: RSSSF
Rules for classification: W) 3 points; PW) 2 point; PKL) 1 point, no extra time
(R) Relegated

=== Championship playoffs ===
| Pos | Team | Pld | W | PW | PKL | L | GF | GA | GD | Pts | Qualification |
|---|---|---|---|---|---|---|---|---|---|---|---|
| 1 | Muktijoddha Sangsad (C) | 17 | 10 | 4 | 2 | 1 | 24 | 6 | +18 | 40 | Qualification for the 2001–02 Asian Club Championship First Round |
| 2 | Mohammedan | 17 | 11 | 1 | 2 | 3 | 44 | 15 | +29 | 37 | |
| 3 | Dhaka Abahani | 17 | 10 | 1 | 1 | 5 | 35 | 20 | +15 | 33 | |

Source: RSSSF
Rules for classification: W) 3 points; PW) 2 point; PKL) 1 point, no extra time
(C) Champion

== Top scorers ==
| Rank | Scorer | Club | Goals |
|---|---|---|---|
| 1 | (Ghana) Kennedy | Dhaka Abahani | 17 |
| 2 | (Bangladesh) Imtiaz Ahmed Nakib | Mohammedan | 16 |
| 3 | (Bangladesh) Ashraful Kader Manju | Dhanmondi Club | 10 |
| 4 | (Bangladesh) Saifur Rahman Moni | Rahmatganj | 8 |
| 4 | (Bangladesh) Alfaz Ahmed | Mohammedan | 8 |
| 4 | (Bangladesh) Rokonuzzaman Kanchan | Dhaka Abahani | 8 |
| 7 | (Kenya) Okimo Oinu | Arambagh | 7 |
| 8 | (Bangladesh) Mizanur Rahman Dawn | Dhaka Abahani | 6 |
| 9 | (Bangladesh) Askar Khan Babu | Mohammedan | 5 |
| 9 | (Bangladesh) Saiful Islam Khokon | Arambagh | 5 |
| 9 | (Nepal) Basanta Thapa | Brothers Union | 5 |
| 9 | (Bangladesh) Mohammed Sohel | Victoria | 5 |
