= DMFA Cup =

- Organiser(s): BFF
- Founded: 1984; 42 years ago
- Abolished: 1995; 31 years ago
- Region: Bangladesh
- Teams: 9
- Last champions: Dhaka Abahani (1st title)
- Most championships: Mohammedan SC (3 titles)

The Dhaka Metropolitan Football Association Cup or DMFA Cup was an association football tournament held in Dhaka and organized by Dhaka Metropolitan League Committee under the supervision of the Bangladesh Football Federation.

== Results ==
List of DMFA Cup Finals
| Year | Winners | Score | Runners-up | Source |
|---|---|---|---|---|
| 1984 | Mohammedan SC & Brothers Union | 0–0 | None | |
| 1993 | Mohammedan SC | 3–2 | Dhaka Abahani | |
| 1994 | Dhaka Abahani | 1–0 | Brothers Union | |
| 1995 | Mohammedan SC | 3–1 | Brothers Union | |

== Top goalscorers ==
| Year | Players | Club | Goals |
|---|---|---|---|
| 1984 | (Bangladesh) Rizvi Karim Rumi (Bangladesh) Mahmudul Haque Liton | BRTC SC; Brothers Union | 6 |
| 1993 | (Bangladesh) Rizvi Karim Rumi | Dhaka Abahani | 8 |
| 1995 | (Bangladesh) Arman Mia | Mohammedan SC | 4 |
| 1995 | (Bangladesh) Mozammel Haque Chowdhury Biplob | Dhaka Abahani | 4 |
