= 1997–98 Dhaka Premier Division Football League =

Dhaka Premier Division League
- Season: 1997–98
- Dates: 12 October 1997 – 11 March 1998
- Champions: Muktijoddha Sangsad
- Relegated: Agrani Bank; Victoria
- Asian Club Championship: Muktijoddha Sangsad
- Matches: 110
- Goals: 198 (1.8 per match)
- Top goalscorer: 13 goals Imtiaz Ahmed Nakib (Muktijoddha Sangsad)

The 1997–98 Dhaka Premier Division League was the 23rd season of the top-tier football league in Bangladesh and the 5th season of the Premier Division, following its succession from the First Division as the top-tier. A total of ten teams participated in the league which began on 12 October 1997 and ended on 11 March 1998.

== Venue ==
The Shere Bangla National Stadium in Mirpur, Dhaka was the sole venue used for the league.

Dhaka	1997–98 Dhaka Premier Division Football League is located in Bangladesh
Shere Bangla National Stadium	1997–98 Dhaka Premier Division Football League is located in Bangladesh
Capacity: 25,000	1997–98 Dhaka Premier Division Football League is located in Bangladesh

== Regular season ==
=== League table ===
Pos	Team	Pld	W	D	L	GF	GA	GD	Pts	Qualification or relegation
1	Mohammedan	18	12	5	1	29	8	+21	41	Qualification for the Championship playoffs
2	Muktijoddha Sangsad	18	12	4	2	24	8	+16	40	Qualification for the Championship playoffs
3	Dhaka Abahani	18	10	7	1	19	7	+12	37	Qualification for the Championship playoffs
4	Brothers Union	18	6	5	7	14	15	−1	23	Qualification for the Championship playoffs
5	Farashganj	18	5	4	9	14	24	−10	19	Qualification for the Championship playoffs
6	Arambagh	18	3	8	7	8	17	−9	17	Qualification for the Relegation playoffs
7	Rahmatganj	18	3	8	7	15	23	−8	17	Qualification for the Relegation playoffs
8	Victoria	18	3	7	8	13	20	−7	16	Qualification for the Relegation playoffs
9	Fakirerpool	18	4	4	10	15	21	−6	16	Qualification for the Relegation playoffs
10	Agrani Bank	18	2	8	8	12	20	−8	14	Qualification for the Relegation playoffs

Source: RSSSF
Rules for classification: 1) Points; 2) Goal difference; 3) Goals scored;

Results table

No Home \ No Away	MKS	MSC	DAL	BU	FSC	AKS	RHS	VSC	FYMC	AGB
Muktijoddha Sangsad	—	1–1	0–0	1–0	4–1	1–0	1–2	2–0	2–0	2–0
Mohammedan	2–1	—	1–2	0–0	4–0	0–0	3–0	1–0	3–1	2–0
Dhaka Abahani	0–0	0–0	—	2–0	2–0	1–1	2–0	0–0	2–1	0–0
Brothers Union	0–0	0–1	0–1	—	2–0	1–1	1–1	1–0	2–1	1–2
Farashganj	1–2	0–1	0–1	2–2	—	1–0	2–1	1–1	2–0	0–0
Arambagh	1–2	0–3	0–2	2–0	0–0	—	0–0	0–3	1–0	0–0
Rahmatganj	0–2	2–3	2–2	0–1	1–0	0–1	—	2–2	0–0	1–1
Victoria	0–1	0–2	2–0	1–0	0–1	1–1	1–1	—	0–3	1–1
Fakirerpool	0–1	1–2	0–1	0–1	2–1	0–0	0–0	2–0	—	2–1
Agrani Bank	0–1	0–0	0–1	0–2	1–2	2–0	1–2	1–1	2–2	—

Source: RSSSF
Legend: Blue = left column team win; Yellow = draw; Red = top row team win.

== Playoff phase ==
=== Relegation playoffs ===
Pos	Team	Pld	W	D	L	GF	GA	GD	Pts	Qualification or relegation
1	Rahmatganj	22	4	10	8	17	24	−7	22	
2	Fakirerpool	22	5	7	10	14	22	−8	22	
3	Arambagh	22	4	10	8	10	19	−9	22	
4	Agrani Bank (R)	22	3	11	8	17	22	−5	20	Relegation to the 1999 First Division League
5	Victoria (R)	22	3	9	10	13	25	−12	18	Relegation to the 1999 First Division League

Source: RSSSF
Rules for classification: 1) Points; 2) Goal difference; 3) Goals scored;
(R) Relegated

Results table

No Home / No Away (Single League)	RHS	FYMC	AKS	AGB	VSC
RHS	—	0–0	0–1	1–1	1–0
FYMC	0–0	—	1–0	0–0	1–1
AKS	1–0	0–1	—	1–1	0–0
AGB	1–1	0–0	1–1	—	3–0
VSC	0–1	1–1	0–0	0–3	—

=== Championship playoffs ===
Pos	Team	Pld	W	D	L	GF	GA	GD	Pts	Qualification or relegation
1	Muktijoddha Sangsad (C)	22	16	4	2	31	9	+22	52	Qualification for the 1999–00 Asian Club Championship First round
2	Mohammedan	22	15	5	2	35	12	+23	50	
3	Dhaka Abahani	22	12	7	3	25	11	+14	43	Qualification for the 1997–98 Asian Cup Winners' Cup First round (Note: Qualified as champions of the 1997 Bangladesh Federation Cup)
4	Brothers Union	22	6	6	10	18	24	−6	24	
5	Farashganj	22	5	5	12	18	37	−19	20	

Source: RSSSF
Rules for classification: 1) Points; 2) Goal difference; 3) Goals scored;
(C) Champions
Notes:

Results

No Home / No Away (Single League)	MSC	MKS	DAL	BU	FSC
MSC	—	0–0	1–0	3–2	2–0
MKS	0–0	—	1–0	3–1	1–0
DAL	0–1	0–1	—	1–0	5–2
BU	2–3	1–3	0–1	—	1–1
FSC	0–2	0–1	2–5	1–1	—

== Top scorers ==
Rank	Scorer	Club	Goals
1	(Bangladesh) Imtiaz Ahmed Nakib	Muktijoddha Sangsad	13
2	(Bangladesh) Alfaz Ahmed	Mohammedan	11
2	(Bangladesh) Maksudul Amin Rana	Dhaka Abahani	11
4	(Bangladesh) Mizanur Rahman Dawn	Mohammedan	10
5	(Bangladesh) Bhaktiar Uddin	Brothers Union	9
6	(Bangladesh) Shahajuddin Tipu	Dhaka Abahani	8
7	(Bangladesh) Mohammed Jalal Uddin Jalal	Fakirerpool	7
8	(Bangladesh) Ariful Kabir Farhad	Farashganj	6
8	(Bangladesh) Murad Hossain Milon	Rahmatganj	6
