= Agrani Bank Ltd. SC =

Association football club in Bangladesh

- Full name: Agrani Bank Limited Sports Club
- Nickname: The Bankers
- Founded: 1972; 54 years ago
- Owner: Agrani Bank
- Chairman: Md Rafique
- Head Coach: Vacant
- League: Bangladesh Championship League
- 2020–21: Championship League, 10th of 12th
Home colours	Away colours

Agrani Bank Ltd. Sports Club (Bengali: অগ্রণী ব্যাংক লিমিটেড এসসি) is a Bangladeshi professional football club based in Dhaka. The club is owned by Agrani Bank PLC, a state-owned commercial bank. It last participated in the 2021–22 Bangladesh Championship League, however withdrew from the league the following season.

== Current squad ==
Agrani Bank Ltd. SC squad for 2020–21 season.

As of 4 July 2021

Note: Flags indicate national team as defined under FIFA eligibility rules; some limited exceptions apply. Players may hold more than one non-FIFA nationality.

No.	Pos.	Nation	Player
1	GK	BAN	Mithun Khalifa
2	DF	BAN	Md Abul Hasnat Bipul
3	DF	BAN	Md Nazmul Hossain
4	DF	BAN	Md Morshad Alam
5	DF	BAN	Md Rasel Hossain
6	MF	BAN	Md Anisul Haque Khoka Babu
7	FW	BAN	Md Saiful Islam Saddam
8	FW	BAN	Md Shawkat Hossen
9	MF	BAN	Md Jabed
10	FW	BAN	Md Abul Kalam Azad
11	FW	BAN	Md Jahangir Alam
12	FW	BAN	Masum Bella
13	DF	BAN	Titu Chondro Mondol
14	FW	BAN	Nadim Sultan Munna
16	FW	BAN	Trishan Barman
17	FW	BAN	Monirul Islam

No.	Pos.	Nation	Player
18	FW	BAN	Saim Aftab
20	FW	BAN	Mominul Islam
21	FW	BAN	Sohag Bormon
22	GK	BAN	Mohammad Anis
23	MF	BAN	Redowan Hasan Linkon
24	MF	BAN	Md Abdur Rahman
—	MF	BAN	Raihanul Islam
26	DF	BAN	Sagar Sarkar
30	GK	BAN	Shahidul Molla
—	GK	BAN	Md Mostafizur Rahman
31	FW	BAN	Md Khalilur Rahman
—	FW	BAN	Shamim Forhad
33	DF	BAN	Md Shaharul Islam
—	FW	BAN	Md Foysal Hossain

== Personnel ==
=== Head coaches record ===
As of 13 June 2022

Head Coach	From	To	P	W	D	L	GS	GA	%W
(Bangladesh) Sheikh Abdullah	20 January 2021	20 November 2021	22	6	9	7	18	20	27.27
(Bangladesh) Md Rezaul Haque Shamim	2 January 2022	13 June 2022	22	7	3	12	24	39	31.82

== Honours ==
- Dhaka First Division League
  - Champions (1): 2000
- Dhaka Second Division League
  - Runners-up (1): 1987
- Dhaka Third Division League
  - Champions (1): 1975
