= Dhaka Premier Division Football League =

Bangladeshi top-tier football league (1993–2006)

- Organising bodies: BFF
- Founded: 1993
- First season: 1993
- Folded: 2006
- Country: Bangladesh
- Confederation: AFC
- Number of clubs: 10 (2005)
- Level on pyramid: 1 (1993–2006)
- Relegation to: Dhaka First Division League
- Domestic cup(s): Federation Cup; Independence Cup; DMFA Cup
- International cup(s): Asian Club Championship (1996–99); Asian Cup Winners' Cup (1995–98)
- Last champions: Brothers Union (2nd title)
- Most championships: Mohammedan (4 titles)
- Top scorer: Imtiaz Ahmed Nakib (95)

The Dhaka Premier Division Football League (Bengali: ঢাকা প্রিমিয়ার ডিভিশন ফুটবল লিগ) was the top-tier football league in Bangladesh from 1993 to 2006. It replaced the First Division as both the highest level of the Dhaka Football League and the country's top-tier football competition. Following the introduction of the Premier Division, the First Division was reclassified as the second-tier league until 2006. Together, the Premier Division and First Division constituted the Senior Division of the Dhaka Football League. Both league's were operated by the Dhaka Metropolitan Football Association (DMFA) under the supervision of Bangladesh Football Federation (BFF).

Upon the creation of the country's first national top-tier professional football league, the Bangladesh Football League (formerly B.League) in 2007, the Premier Division was merged with the First Division, and was re-introduced as the second-tier, the sole Senior Division. Finally, after the introduction of a national second-tier professional football league, the Bangladesh Championship League in 2012, it became the third-tier.

== History ==
In 1993, the Dhaka Metropolitan Football Association (DMFA) under the supervision of Bangladesh Football Federation (BFF) established the Premier Division as the top tier of the Dhaka Football League, replacing the First Division, which subsequently became the second-tier. The inaugural Premier Division season featured the ten highest-placed clubs from the 1991–92 First Division: Dhaka Abahani, Mohammedan, Brothers Union, Agrani Bank, Muktijoddha Sangsad, Arambagh, PWD, Wari, Rahmatganj, and Victoria.

The league's first two seasons were sponsored by Bangladesh Tobacco Company, which agreed to an initial Tk 18 lakh sponsorship deal with the BFF covering both the Premier Division and First Division. Together, the two divisions constituted the Senior Division of the Dhaka Football League, a designation previously held solely by the First Division. The inaugural Premier Division match was played on 11 June 1993 between Dhaka Abahani and PWD, ending in a 1–1 draw. Abahani's Ahmed Ali scored the league's first goal and also received the competition's first red card during the same match. Dhaka Abahani went on to win the inaugural title.

The 3 point system (three points for a win, one point for a draw, and zero points for a loss) was implemented from the 1995 Premier Division. The 1997–98 Premier Division title triumph by Muktijoddha Sangsad ended the 17-year league dominance of Dhaka Abahani and Mohammedan.

Beginning with the 1997–98 Asian Club Championship, the Premier Division champions qualified for the AFC Club Championship, with the 1996 Premier Division champions Mohammedan becoming the league's first representatives in the competition. In 2000, the National Football League was introduced as a nationwide competition with the top teams from each Premier Division season qualifying. Although it was the first national football league in Bangladesh, it remained outside the domestic league system, operating as a tournament without a promotion and relegation system. Following the reintroduction of the AFC Club Championship after the 2001–02 edition, continental qualification was reserved exclusively for the winners of national competitions. With the introduction of the AFC Cup, the AFC's second-tier club competition, in 2004, qualification places were awarded to the champions of the National Football League and the winners of the Federation Cup.

In 2000, the league also signed a three-year sponsorship deal with National Bank Limited worth Tk 45 lakh. Penalty shootouts to decide tied matches, inspired by the J.League format, were introduced from the 2000 Premier Division. A win in regulation time earned 3 points and a loss 0 points. If a match was level after 90 minutes, it proceeded directly to a penalty shootout, with the shootout winner receiving 2 points and the loser 1 point. The system was reverted from the 2003–04 season.

Following the creation of the country's first national top-tier professional football league, the Bangladesh Football League (formerly B.League), in 2007, the Premier Division was merged with the First Division and reintroduced as the second-tier, becoming the sole Senior Division of the Dhaka Football League.

== Competition format and sponsorship ==
=== Timeline ===
Edition	Participants	Important events	ACC slots	Rel. slots
1993	10	Held in a double round-robin format.; A relegation play-off was held between the 8th and 9th placed teams instead of using goal difference to determine relegation.	none	2
1994	10	Held in a double round-robin format.; A relegation play-off was held between the 8th and 9th placed teams instead of using goal difference to determine relegation.; Following clubs are promoted from First Division: Fakirerpool and Bangladesh Boys	none	2
1995	10	Held in a double round-robin format.; The three-point system was adopted, replacing the previous 2-point-for-a-win system. Under the new system, teams received 3 points for a win, 1 point for a draw, and 0 points for a loss.; Following clubs are promoted from First Division: Rahmatganj and Farashganj	none	2
1996	10	Held in a double round-robin format.; Following clubs are promoted from First Division: East End and Bangladesh Boys	1	2
1997–98	10	Held in a double round-robin format, after which the top five teams qualify for the Super League, played in a single round-robin format, while the bottom five teams qualify for the Relegation League, which is also played in a single round-robin format.; Following clubs are promoted from First Division: Victoria and Rahmatganj	1	2
1998	not held			
1999	10	The competition was held in a double round-robin format, after which the top four teams qualify for the Super League, played in a single round-robin format. The bottom six teams qualify for the Lower Six Round, which is also played in a single round-robin format. Following this, the bottom three teams compete in the Relegation League, which is likewise played in a single round-robin format.; Following clubs are promoted from First Division (1997–98): Badda Jagoroni and Mirpur Chalantika	none	2
2000	10	The competition was held in a double round-robin format, after which the top four teams qualify for the Super 4 League, which is played in a single round-robin format. The top three teams from the Super 4 League then qualify for the Super 3 League, which is also played in a single round-robin format. Meanwhile, the bottom six teams qualify for the Lower Six Round, which is also played in a single round-robin format. Following this, the bottom three teams compete in the Relegation League, which is likewise played in a single round-robin format.; Tied matches were decided by penalty shootouts. A regulation-time win earned 3 points and a loss 0 points. If a match was tied after 90 minutes, the penalty shootout winner received 2 points and the loser 1 point.; Following clubs are promoted from First Division: Victoria and Dhanmondi	1	2
2001	10	The competition was held in a double round-robin format, after which the top three teams qualify for the Super League, played in a single round-robin format. The bottom seven teams qualify for the Lower Seven Round, which is also played in a single round-robin format. Following this, the bottom three teams compete in the Relegation League, which is likewise played in a single round-robin format.; Tied matches were decided by penalty shootouts. A regulation-time win earned 3 points and a loss 0 points. If a match was tied after 90 minutes, the penalty shootout winner received 2 points and the loser 1 point.; Following clubs are promoted from First Division: Agrani Bank and Fakirerpool	none	2
2002	10	Held in a double round-robin format, after which the top five teams qualify for the Super League, played in a single round-robin format, while the bottom five teams qualify for the Relegation League, which is also played in a single round-robin format.; Tied matches were decided by penalty shootouts. A regulation-time win earned 3 points and a loss 0 points. If a match was tied after 90 minutes, the penalty shootout winner received 2 points and the loser 1 point.; Following clubs are promoted from First Division: Victoria and Badda Jagoroni	none	2
2003–04	10	Held in a double round-robin format.; The penalty shootout rule for tied matches was abolished.; Following clubs are promoted from First Division: Dhaka Wanderers and Sheikh Russel	none	3
2005	10	Held in a double round-robin format.; A championship play-off was held between the 1st and 2nd placed teams instead of using goal difference to determine the championship.; Following clubs are promoted from First Division: Fakirerpool, Farashganj and Dipali	none	3
2005–06	not held			
2006–07	not held			

=== Relegation ===
Edition	Participants	Relegated positions	Relegated 1	Relegated 2	Relegated 3	Withdrew	Relegated to
1993	10	Relegation play-off (8th vs 9th) & 10th	Rahmatganj	Victoria	None	None	1994 First Division
1994	10	Relegation play-off (8th vs 9th) & 10th	Bangladesh Boys	PWD	None	None	1995 First Division
1995	10	9th & 10th	Rahmatganj	Wari	None	None	1996 First Division
1996	10	9th & 10th	East End	Bangladesh Boys	None	None	1997–98 First Division
1997–98	10	9th & 10th	Agrani Bank	Victoria	None	None	~~1998 First Division~~; 1999 First Division
1998	not held						
1999	10	9th & 10th	Fakirerpool	Mirpur Chalantika	None	None	2000 First Division
2000	10	9th & 10th	Badda Jagoroni	Victoria	None	None	2001 First Division
2001	10	9th & 10th	Agrani Bank	Fakirerpool	None	None	2002 First Division
2002	10	9th & 10th	Rahmatganj	Farashganj	None	None	2003–04 First Division
2003–04	10	8th, 9th & 10th	Victoria	Badda Jagoroni	Dhanmondi Club	None	2005 First Division
2005	10	8th, 9th & 10th	Dhaka Wanderers	Fakirerpool	Dipali	None	~~2005–06 First Division~~; 2007–08 Senior Division
2005–06	not held						
2006–07	not held						

=== Sponsors ===
Period	Sponsor	Tournament name
1993–1994	Bangladesh Tobacco Company	STAR Football League
1995	Lever Brothers Limited	Lifebuoy Premier League
1996	Danish Condensed Milk	Danish Condensed Milk Dhaka Premier League
1997–98	None	
1999	Keya Cosmetics Limited	Keya Cosmetics Dhaka Premier Division League
2000–2002	National Bank Limited	National Bank Dhaka Premier Division Football League
2003–2004	Western Union	Western Union Dhaka Premier Division Football League
2005	Premier Bank PLC.	Premier Bank Premier Division Football League

== Champions ==
Titles won by club (%)
1. Mohammedan – 4 (36.4%)
2. Dhaka Abahani – 3 (27.2%)
3. Muktijoddha – 2 (18.2%)
4. Brothers Union – 2 (18.2%)

The list includes the total number of league titles each club has attained.

Club	Titles	Winning years
Mohammedan	4	1993, 1996, 1999, 2002
Dhaka Abahani	3	1994, 1995, 2001
Muktijoddha	2	1997–98, 2000
Brothers Union	2	2003–04, 2005

=== Doubles ===
Two teams have won the double of the Premier Division and the Federation Cup:

Club	Number	Seasons
Mohammedan	1	2002
Brothers Union	1	2005

== Records ==
=== Top goalscorers ===
Year	Nationality	Player	Club	Goals	Source
1993	(Russia)	Oleg Zhivotnikov	Mohammedan	13	
1994	(Russia)	Andrey Kazakov	Mohammedan	11	
1995	(Bangladesh)	Imtiaz Ahmed Nakib	Muktijoddha	12	
1996	(Bangladesh)	Imtiaz Ahmed Nakib	Muktijoddha	13	
1997–98	(Bangladesh)	Imtiaz Ahmed Nakib	Muktijoddha	13	
1999	(Bangladesh)	Imtiaz Ahmed Nakib	Muktijoddha	12	
2000	(Ghana)	Kennedy	Dhaka Abahani	17	
2001	(Nigeria)	Emeka Ochilifu	Muktijoddha	10	
2001	(Bangladesh)	Rezaul Karim Liton	Arambagh	10	
2002	(Nigeria)	Colly Barnes	Dhaka Abahani	12	
2003–04	(Cameroon)	Etigo	Mohammedan	16	
2005	(Russia)	Victor Edwards	Brothers Union	11	

=== Unbeaten teams ===
- Dhaka Abahani (1994)

1994 : Captained by Monem Munna, Dhaka Abahani played 18 matches in the season, recording 10 wins and 8 draws. They scored 33 goals and conceded 8, finishing with 28 points—three points ahead of runners-up Muktijoddha.

- Mohammedan (1996)

1996 : Mohammedan played 18 matches in the season, recording 15 wins and 3 draws. They scored 36 goals and conceded 9, finishing with 48 points—five points ahead of runners-up Dhaka Abahani.

== Asian Competition ==
AFC Club Championship

- Mohammedan qualified for the 1997–98 Asian Club Championship as 1996 Premier Division champions.
- Muktijoddha qualified for the 1999–2000 Asian Club Championship as 1997–98 Premier Division champions.
- Muktijoddha qualified for the 2001–02 Asian Club Championship as 2000 Premier Division champions.

Team	Appearances	1994–95–1996–97	1997–98	1998–99	1999–2000	2000–01	2001–02
Dhaka Mohammedan	1	DNP	QS	DNP	–	DNP	–
Muktijoddha Sangsad	2	DNP	–	DNP	QS	DNP	R16

W: Winners RU: Runners-up SF: Semifinals QF: Quarterfinals R16: Round of 16 GS: Group Stage QS: Qualifying Stage DNP: Did not participate W/D: Withdraw

Asian Cup Winners' Cup

- Mohammedan qualified for the 1993–94 Asian Cup Winners' Cup as 1993 DMFA Cup winners.
- Mohammedan qualified for the 1996–97 Asian Cup Winners' Cup as 1995 Federation Cup winners.
- Dhaka Abahani qualified for the 1997–98 Asian Cup Winners' Cup as 1997 Federation Cup winners.

Team	Appearances	1993–94	1994–95–1995–96	1996–97	1997–98	1998–99–2001–02
Dhaka Mohammedan	2	R2	DNP	R2	–	DNP
Dhaka Abahani	1	–	DNP	–	R2	DNP

W: Winners RU: Runners-up SF: Semifinals QF: Quarterfinals R1: First Round R2: Second Round IR: Intermediate Round DNP: Did not participate W/D: Withdraw

== See also ==
- Dhaka Football League
- Federation Cup
- Independence Cup
- DMFA Cup
- Bangladeshi football league system
- Dhaka derby
