= National Football League (Bangladesh) =

Defunct football league in Bangladesh

- Organising bodies: Bangladesh Football Federation
- Founded: 2000
- Folded: 2006
- Country: Bangladesh
- Region: Bangladesh
- Confederation: AFC
- Last champions: Mohammedan (2nd title)
- Most championships: Mohammedan (2 titles)
- Website: bff.com.bd

The National Football League (Bengali: জাতীয় ফুটবল লিগ) was a semi-professional association football league in Bangladesh, and the first football league in the country to be organized on a national scale.

From 2000 to 2006, the National Football League was contested by club champions from various districts (Chittagong, Rajshahi, Barishal, and Sylhet), in addition to the top three finishing teams from the country's premier division at the time, the Dhaka Premier Division League.

In 2006, the league was folded, as the Dhaka Premier Division League was replaced by the country's first professional top-tier national league, the Bangladesh Premier League.

== History ==
In 2000, the Bangladesh Football Federation established the National Football League (NFL), which was played alongside the country's top-tier league at the time, the Dhaka Premier Division League. The league was introduced in order for different district champions to get a better platform, as the top-tier league only featured clubs from Dhaka.

The league included the top 3 finishing teams from each Dhaka Premier Division League season, along with district league champions of Chittagong, Rajshahi and the winners of a playoff between the champions of Sylhet and Barisal. From the 2003 season, the winners of the National League were given a spot in the group-stages of the AFC Cup instead of Dhaka Premier Division League champions.

From 2005 to 2007, the Dhaka Premier Division League was not held, which meant the National Football League was the only functioning competition which had the country's top clubs participate, aside from than the domestic cup competitions.

In 2007, the Bangladesh Premier League replaced the Dhaka Premier Division League as the country's top tier. This marked the beginning of Bangladesh's first professional football league contested on a national scale, which meant that a National Football League would no longer be required.

== Sponsorship ==
Nitol-Tata Group was the title sponsor of the entirety of the competition. For sponsorship reason, the competition was also known as Nitol-Tata National Football League.

Period	Sponsor	Amount	Print Media	Ref.
2000–2005	Nitol-Tata Group	40 lakhs BDT	Daily Inqilab	

== Results ==
Season	Winner	Runner-up	Third-place	Top Scorer	Goals
2000	Dhaka Abahani	Mohammedan	Chittagong Abahani		
2001–02	Mohammedan	Dhaka Abahani	None		
2003	Muktijoddha SKC	Mohammedan	Dhaka Abahani	(Bangladesh) Saifur Rahman Moni	7
2004	Brothers Union	Muktijoddha SKC	Dhaka Abahani	(Bangladesh) Saifur Rahman Moni	6
2005–06	Mohammedan	Dhaka Abahani	None		

== See also ==
- National Football Championship (Bangladesh)
