= Biplob Bhattacharjee =

Bangladeshi footballer

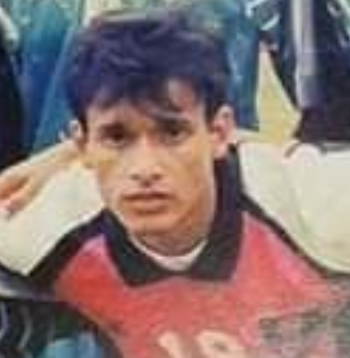
- Biplob with Bangladesh at the 1999 SA Games

Personal information
- Full name: Biplob Bhattacharjee
- Date of birth: 7 January 1981 (age 45)
- Place of birth: Cumilla, Bangladesh
- Height: 1.80 m (5 ft 11 in)
- Position: Goalkeeper

Youth career
- 1993: Dipali JS

Senior career*
Years	Team	Apps	(Gls)
1994–2000	Dhaka Abahani		(0)
2001	Farashganj SC		(0)
2002	Muktijoddha Sangsad		(0)
2003–2004	Brothers Union		(0)
2004–2005	Mohammedan SC		(0)
2006–2010	Dhaka Abahani		(0)
2010–2011	Muktijoddha Sangsad		(0)
2011–2014	Sheikh Russel KC		(0)
2015	Brothers Union		(0)
2016–2018	Sheikh Russel KC		(0)
2018–2019	Brothers Union	8	(0)

International career
1996	Bangladesh U16		(0)
1998	Bangladesh U19		(0)
2002–2003	Bangladesh U23		(0)
1997–2013	Bangladesh	29	(0)

Managerial career
- 2021–2022: Bangladesh (goalkeeping coach)
- 2023: Sheikh Jamal DC (goalkeeping coach)
- 2026–: Bangladesh U20 (goalkeeping coach)
Medal record
Representing Bangladesh
Men's football
South Asian Games
Gold medal – first place	1999
SAFF Championship
Runner-up	1999
Winner	2003
Runner-up	2005
- * Club domestic league appearances and goals

Biplob Bhattacharjee (Bengali: বিপ্লব ভট্টাচার্য; born 7 January 1981), alternatively spelled Biplob Bhattacharya, is a Bangladeshi retired professional footballer who played as a goalkeeper. He represented the Bangladesh national team between 1997 and 2013.

== Club career ==
Biplob began his career in the Pioneer Football League in 1993 with Dipali Jubo Sangha. After helping Dipali gain promotion to the Third Division, Biplab was signed as a third choice keeper by Abahani Limited Dhaka of the Premier Division in 1994, following trials. In 1995, after the club's first-choice keeper, Saidur Rahman, fell ill, Biplob took his place in the starting eleven. He served the role of Abahani's first-choice keeper until 2000, and won the league title in both 1994 and 1995.

In 2000, Biplob joined Muktijoddha Sangsad KC as a guest player for the 2000 National League, before returning to Abahani for the Premier Division. In 2001, he departed the club on permanent basis, joining relegation contenders, Farashganj SC, due to the national transfer pool. In 2002, he joined Muktijoddha Sangsad and spent a lone season at the club before being signed by Brothers Union. He helped the Oranges win their first Premier Division title, before departing for Mohammedan SC.

In 2007, Biplop returned to Abahani for the country's inaugural professional league, the B.League. He was part of the team that won hat-trick professional league titles from 2007 to 2010, captaining the team during the final year. He also represented Abahani in the 2008 and 2009 editions of the AFC President's Cup, without finding much success. In 2010, he transferred to Muktijoddha Sangsad and helped the club finish league runners-up.

In 2011, Biplop joined Sheikh Russel KC and was captain of the team which won the domestic treble in the 2012–13 season. He also helped Sheikh Russel become the first became the first Bangladeshi club to qualify for the final round of the AFC President's Cup in the 2014 edition. He joined Brothers Union for the 2018–19 league season and played his final professional game against Saif SC on 17 June 2019.

== International career ==
In 1996, Biplob represented the Bangladesh U16 team in the 1996 AFC U-16 Championship qualifiers held in Nagoya, Japan. The following year, the U16 coach, Otto Pfister who also coached the senior national team, included Biplob in the squad that participated in the 1998 FIFA World Cup qualification – AFC first round. He made his senior international debut at the age of 16 in the 0–3 defeat to Saudi Arabia on 27 March 1997, and during the match he saved a penalty in the tenth minute. In the following four days he made two more appearances for the team, keeping goal in the 2–1 win over Chinese Taipei and the 0–1 loss to Malaysia.

Biplob was also part of the national team at the 1997 SAFF Gold Cup in Kathmandu, Nepal. During which Bangladesh failed to advance past the group stages, suffering 0–3 defeat to India and salvaging a 1–1 draw with Maldives. He also featured for the Bangladesh U19 team at the 1998 AFC Youth Championship qualifiers held in Sri Lanka.

He was the first-choice keeper at the 1999 South Asian Games in Kathmandu, Nepal, appearing in all four games as Bangladesh won their maiden gold medal. He remained first-choice throughout the year due to Aminul Haque's injury, and represented the team at the 2000 AFC Asian Cup qualifiers held in Abu Dhabi, UAE. However, with a fit again Aminul, second-choice, Biplob's next appearance for the national team would come after almost four years, on 15 January 2003 against Bhutan at the 2003 SAFF Gold Cup held in Dhaka. Thus, playing only one game as Bangladesh would go on to win their first ever SAFF Championship.

In 2002, he also represented Bangladesh U23 at the 2002 Asian Games in Busan, South Korea. During the tournament he played in all three group-stage matches.

In 2007, with Aminul once again injured, Biplob won six caps for Bangladesh, playing in all of the national team's games that year. Between 2008 and 2010, he made only two appearances for the national team, coming in the 2008 SAFF Championship and 2010 AFC Challenge Cup. He was initially dropped from the squad prior to the 2009 SAFF Championship by Brazilian coach Dido. However, following Dido's dismissal less than a month before the tournament, interim head coach Shahidur Rahman Shantoo, included Biplob in the final 21-man squad.

Following, Aminul's retirement from international football on 18 June 2010, Biplob served as Bangladesh' first-choice keeper and captain during the 2014 FIFA World Cup qualification – AFC first round against Pakistan. However, after Bangladesh advanced to the second round, coach Nikola Ilievski preferred Mamun Khan as the first-choice keeper, although Biplob remained as the national team's captain. He would eventually lose his captaincy to Mohammed Sujan prior to the 2011 SAFF Championship. In August 2013, Biplob announced that he would retire following the 2013 SAFF Championship, although later he would show uncertainty about the decision. He would serve as backup to Mamun Khan during the tournament.

Notably, Biplob was honoured by the South Asian Football Federation on 10 September 2013, for being the only player to represent his country in eight Saff Championships.

== Coaching career ==
In January 2021, Biplob was appointed as the goalkeeping coach of the Bangladesh national team.

== Career statistics ==
=== International ===
Appearances and goals by national team and year
National team	Year	Apps	Goals
Bangladesh
Bangladesh	1997	6	0
Bangladesh	1998	1	0
Bangladesh	1999	7	0
Bangladesh	2001	1	0
Bangladesh	2003	1	0
Bangladesh	2005	1	0
Bangladesh	2006	2	0
Bangladesh	2007	6	0
Bangladesh	2008	1	0
Bangladesh	2010	1	0
Bangladesh	2011	2	0
Bangladesh	Total	29	0

== Honours ==
Dipali Jubo Sangha

- Pioneer League: 1993

Abahani Limited Dhaka

- Bangladesh Premier League: 2007, 2008–09, 2009–10
- Dhaka Premier Division League: 1994, 1995
- Federation Cup: 1997, 1999, 2000
- DMFA Cup: 1994
- Victory Day Club Cup: 2008

Brothers Union

- Dhaka Premier Division League: 2003–04

Sheikh Russel KC

- Bangladesh Premier League: 2012–13
- Federation Cup: 2012
- Independence Cup: 2012–13

Bangladesh

- South Asian Games Gold medal: 1999
- SAFF Championship: 2003; runners-up: 1999, 2005
