= Mohiuddin Ibnul Siraji =

Bangladeshi footballer

Personal information
- Full name: Md Mohiuddin Ibnul Siraji
- Date of birth: 25 July 1985 (age 41)
- Place of birth: Sirajganj, Bangladesh
- Height: 1.64 m (5 ft 5 in)
- Position: Right-back

Youth career
- 1997–2000: BKSP

Senior career*
Years	Team	Apps	(Gls)
2000–2003	Wari Club		
2003–2004	Dhaka Abahani		
2003	→ Sirajganj Mohammedan (loan)		
2004–2007	Brothers Union		
2007–2013	Dhaka Abahani		
2013–2015	Muktijoddha Sangsad		

International career
2003	Bangladesh U20		
2006	Bangladesh U23		
2006	Bangladesh	4	(0)
- * Club domestic league appearances and goals

Mohiuddin Ibnul Siraji (Bengali: মহিউদ্দিন ইবনুল সিরাজী; born 25 August 1985) is a retired Bangladeshi professional footballer who represented the Bangladesh national team in 2006.

== Club career ==
In 2000, Siraji began playing in the Dhaka First Division League with Wari Club, having spent his youth career at Bangladesh Krira Shikkha Protishtan. He represented Sirajganj Mohammedan Sporting Club in the 2003 National Football League. In 2005, Siraji played an integral role as Brothers Union won their second consecutive Dhaka Premier Division League title. He won four Bangladesh Premier League titles representing Abahani Limited Dhaka. He also represented Abahani in the AFC President's Cup.

== International career ==
In 2003, Siraji represented the Bangladesh U20 team during the 2004 AFC Youth Championship qualifiers. Siraji participated in the 2006 Asian Games with the Bangladesh U23 team. In the same year, he played in the 2006 AFC Challenge Cup, held on home soil, during which he appeared in all four games as the hosts crashed out of the quarter-finals.

== Honours ==
Abahani Limited Dhaka

- Bangladesh Premier League: 2007, 2008–09, 2009–10, 2012
- Federation Cup: 2010
- Super Cup: 2011
- Bordoloi Trophy: 2010

Brothers Union

- Dhaka Premier Division League: 2005
- Federation Cup: 2005
