= Aminul Haque (footballer) =

Bangladeshi footballer (born 1980)

- আমিনুল হক
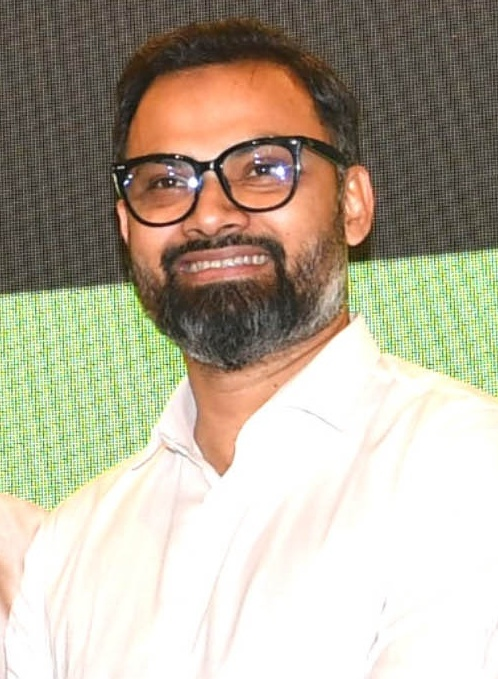
- Haque in 2026

Minister of State for Youth and Sports
- Incumbent
- Assumed office 17 February 2026
- Prime Minister: Tarique Rahman
- Preceded by: Zahid Ahsan Russel

Personal details
- Born: Mohamed Aminul Haque; 5 October 1980 (age 46) Bhola, Bangladesh
- Party: Bangladesh Nationalist Party
- Children: 3
- Occupation: footballer, politician
Association football career
- Full name: Mohamed Aminul Haque
- Height: 1.85 m (6 ft 1 in)
- Position: Goalkeeper
Youth career
- 1990–1993: City Club
Senior career*
Years	Team	Apps	(Gls)
1994–1995	Mohammedan		
1996	Farashganj		
1997–1998	Muktijoddha		
1999–2000	Dhaka Abahani		
2000–2007	Muktijoddha		
2006	→ Brothers Union (loan)		
2008–2010	Mohammedan		
2011–2012	Sheikh Jamal		
2012–2013	BJMC		
2013–2014	Muktijoddha		
International career
1996	Bangladesh U16		
1998	Bangladesh U19		
2010	Bangladesh U23 (OA)	8	(0)
1998–2010	Bangladesh	56	(0)
Medal record
Men's football
Representing Bangladesh
SAFF Championship
Winner	2003 Bangladesh
Runner-up	2005 Pakistan
Runner-up	1999 India
South Asian Games
Gold medal – first place	2010 Bangladesh
- * Club domestic league appearances and goals

Aminul Haque (born 5 October 1980) is a former Bangladeshi professional footballer who played as a goalkeeper. He is also a state minister in the ministry of sports and youth. He is regarded as one of the greatest Bangladeshi footballers and has been marked as the "Greatest Goalkeeper to have represented Bangladesh." According to the former coach of the Bangladesh national team, György Kottán, Aminul is one of the best goalkeepers he has ever seen. Aminul's positional sense and ability to read the game made him one of the greatest goalkeepers in South Asian football history. Shebby Singh of ESPN Star suggested that Aminul deserved to play in a better league, even in England, with proper training.

Aminul is a product of MSPCC City Club and began his career in the Dhaka Premier Division League with Mohammedan SC in 1994. He won his first league title with Muktijoddha Sangsad KC in the 1997–98 season. He made his continental debut during the 2001–02 Asian Club Championship with Muktijoddha. With the Freedom Fighters he also won two Federation Cup titles along with the National League. In 2009, he won the first edition of the Super Cup with Mohammedan and was also awarded with the tournament's Best Goalkeeper Award. He spent the majority of his career with Muktijoddha, with his first stint lasting from 1997 to 1998, his second from 2000 to 2007, and his final stint from 2013 to 2014, after which he retired.

Aminul represented the Bangladesh national team from 1998 to 2010. He was capped about 56 times during which he captained his country in 2006, 2008, 2009 and 2010. He played an instrumental part when Bangladesh lifted the 2002 FIFA World Cup qualifiers. He also had notable performances during both the 2002 FIFA World Cup qualification – AFC first round and the 2009 SAFF Championship. He captained the Bangladesh U23 to gold at the 2010 South Asian Games.

== Early life ==
Born in Bhola, Aminul spent most of his childhood in Dhaka, the son of Mohammad Emran and Manwara Begum. He is the youngest among three brothers. His brother Moinul Haque, who was ten years his senior, also played in the Dhaka Premier Division Football League. While still in fourth grade, Aminul began training with MSPCC City Club under coach Imtiaz. While playing for the junior team of City Club in a local tournament in Alubdi village, Mirpur, Aminul received Tk 150 for his performances. In 1993, he participated in the Pioneer Football League with City Club and managed to keep nine consecutive cleansheets in the first phase of the league.

== Club career ==
=== Mohammedan ===
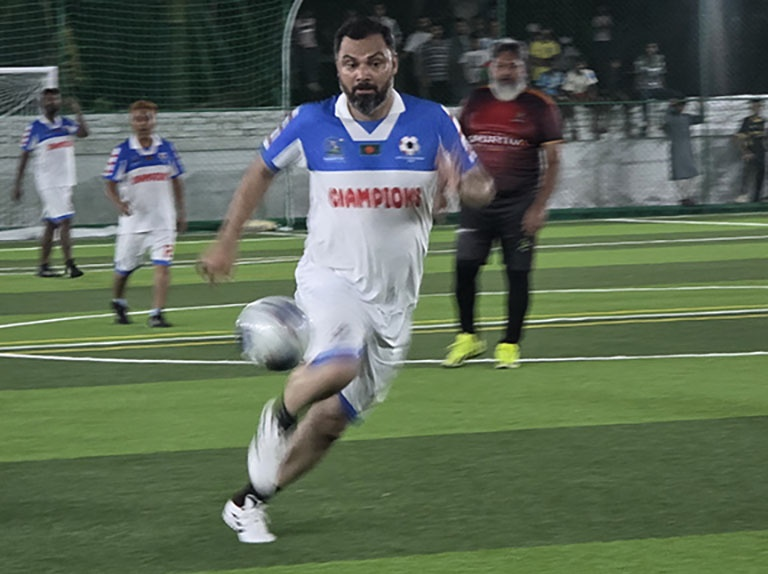
Haque playing football in 2026.

Following his performance in the Pioneer League, Aminul was offered a move to East End Club in the First Division League of Dhaka. Nonetheless, he was signed by the defending Premier Division League champions, Mohammedan SC, with the help of his brother, Moinul Haque, and Mohammedan defender Imtiaz Sultan Johnny. With veteran keeper Sayeed Hassan Kanan at the club, Aminul spent his time at Mohammedan as the third choice. In 1995, after making a good impression on Mohammedan's Nigerian coach Kadiri Ikhana, Aminul was called up to the national camp for training.

=== Farashganj ===
After his two-year binding at Mohammedan ended, Aminul joined Farashganj SC in the 1996 Premier Division League, for a salary of Tk 1.7 lakh. Under coach Pran Govinda Kundu, Aminul played as first-choice keeper. In his debut season, Farashganj finished sixth in the league and avoided relegation. Aminul came to the limelight with his performance against Fakirerpool Young Men's Club, guiding his team to a 1–0 victory.

=== Muktijoddha ===
In 1997, Aminul joined Muktijoddha Sangsad KC where he became both Premier Division League and Mohonagari Cup champions in his lone season. This was Aminul's first title triumph as the first-choice goalkeeper, while Muktijoddha's league triumph that year also marked the end of the previous 17-year dominance by Abahani and Mohammedan. Aminul's defence, led by Mohammed Jewel Rana and Rajani Kanta Barman, only conceded 9 goals from 22 games. He was also part of the team that won India's McDowell's Cup in 1998. His performance that season both Dhaka giants fighting for his signature for the following year.

=== Dhaka Abahani ===
Aminul joined Abahani Limited Dhaka in 1999. Under coach Pakir Ali, Aminul displayed some the best performances of his career and guided Abahani to the Federation Cup title in his debut season. In the tournament's final he saved two penalties as Abahani defeated his former club Muktijoddha Sangsad 5–3 on penalties. He also won the first edition of the National League in 2000 and departed before the Dhaka Premier League got underway.

=== Muktijoddha (II) ===
In 2000, Aminul returned to Muktijoddha Sangsad KC for his second stint at the club. He won his third Premier Division League in 2000 and also won the Federation Cup the following season. He also played in the 2001–02 Asian Club Championship first round. In 2001, he suffered a spinal disc injury that almost ended his career, until the national team head coach at the time, György Kottán, arranged Aminul's operation in Mumbai. Nonetheless, due to the injury, Aminul stayed out of football for the entirety of 2002. Upon his return, he played an instrumental role in club's 2003 National League triumph under coach Shafiqul Islam Manik.

In 2004, Aminul Haque spent the Dhaka Premier Division League season successfully fighting for his position as the first-choice keeper with the club's junior goalkeeper, Titumir Chowdhury. He later represented Muktijoddha during the 2004 and 2005 editions of the AFC Cup. On 6 January 2006, Aminul displayed a man-of-the-match performance against Abahani in the 2005–06 National League during a 1–2 defeat. In April 2006, he was loaned to Brothers Union for the 2006 AFC Cup. His performance against Mahindra United during a 2–2 draw was also praised by Mahindra coach, Derrick Pereira. Following his return from loan, he missed the inaugural Bangladesh Premier League season in 2007 due to an injury. In December 2007, he returned to top-level action, playing for Mohammedan as a guest player in a three-match series against Abahani.

=== Mohammedan (II) ===
On 24 May 2008, Aminul joined Mohammedan SC for the 2008–09 B.League, marking the end of his 8-year stint with Muktijoddha Sangsad. Aminul was part of the team that finished undefeated runners-up in the 2009–10 Bangladesh League. On 27 March 2009, Mohammedan defeated Abahani 1–0 in the 2009 Citycell Super Cup final. Aminul was rewarded Tk 1 lakh as and honoured with the tournament's Best Goalkeeper Award.

=== Sheikh Jamal ===
In September 2010, Aminul was among the seventeen national team players to join Sheikh Jamal Dhanmondi Club for the 2010–11 Bangladesh League. He won the Premier League title during his first season with the club. He also played an instrumental part in the club's Pokhara Cup triumph in Nepal. He saved three penalties against Ranipokhari Corner Team as Sheikh Jamal won the shoot-out 3–0 to reach the semi-final. He was appointed club captain the following season, as Sheikh Jamal disappointed by finishing sixth place in the league. However, prior to the league, he led the club to the 2011–12 Federation Cup title.

=== BJMC ===
In 2013, Aminul joined office club Team BJMC. He struggled for form with BJMC and went through numerous injury problems as the club finished fourth in the league. On 19 July 2013, Aminul was not included in the squad as BJMC travelled to Bhutan to participate in the 2013 King's Cup. The club's director Arif Khan Joy stated, "Aminul is not in our plans next season, so we are thinking of existing goalkeeper Himel (Mazharul Islam Himel) instead of Aminul."

=== Muktijoddha (III) ===
On 27 October 2013, Aminul joined Muktijoddha Sangsad KC for his third stint. Although he initially thought of retiring, the Muktijoddha officials had convinced him to remain playing professionally for one more year. On 7 December 2013, Aminul suffered an Anterior cruciate ligament injury during the semi-finals of the 2013 Federation Cup against his former club, Team BJMC. He underwent successful surgery on 11 December. He would stay out of action for the entirety of the league season due to the injury and eventually retired following the conclusion of the 2013–14 Bangladesh Premier League.

== International career ==
=== Early years ===
In 1996, Aminul represented the Bangladesh U16 team in the 1996 AFC U-16 Championship qualifiers held in Nagoya, Japan. In 1998, he was called up to the national camp by the coach at the time, Otto Pfister. In the same year, he represented the Bangladesh U19 team in the 1998 AFC Youth Championship qualifiers in Sri Lanka.

In the same year, Aminul made his senior international debut by representing Bangladesh during two friendly games against Qatar and Qatar U23 in Doha. After performing well with Abahani Limited Dhaka, national team coach Samir Shaker made Aminul the first-choice keeper for the 1999 SAFF Gold Cup in Goa, India, where Bangladesh finished runners-up. Nonetheless, after breaking his fingers during the Bangabandhu Cup against Malaysia U23 on 31 August 1999, Aminul was left out of the team for the 1999 South Asian Games, during which Bangladesh won their first gold medal. In July 2000, Aminul toured England with the national team, and also featured in a 0–1 defeat to India during a friendly match held in London.

=== Rise to prominence ===
Aminul was the first-choice goalkeeper during the 2002 FIFA World Cup qualification – AFC first round under coach György Kottán. His standout performance against Saudi Arabia despite a heavy defeat, earned him a contract offer from Saudi Pro League club AL Hilal. However, the deal fell through reportedly due to the negligence of the Bangladesh Football Federation (BFF).

In 2003, Aminul was selected for the national team for the 2003 South Asian Football Federation Gold Cup, held in Dhaka. His inclusion was initially uncertain, as he had missed most of the previous domestic season due to an injury and had recently undergone spinal surgery in Mumbai. Despite these setbacks, Aminul played his most memorable game in the tournament final against the Maldives on 20 January 2003. During the penalty shootout, he saved a crucial shot from Ashraf Luthfy, helping Bangladesh win their first SAFF Championship. Aminul was also named the tournament's Best Goalkeeper. In a later interview, he revealed that he wasn't supposed to play in the final due to severe back pain. However, his determination to help the team win the title led him to play the entire game on painkillers.

Following impressive performances with the national team, Aminul was contacted by English Premier League club Newcastle United for trials. However, according to Aminul, the move did not materialize due to miscommunication between him and the club.

He was an integral part of the team that finished runners-up in the 2005 South Asian Football Federation Gold Cup in Pakistan. In the same year, he helped Bangladesh defeat Pakistan in the preliminary round of the 2007 AFC Asian Cup qualifiers, keeping cleansheets during both legs as Bangladesh won 1–0 on aggregate.

=== Captaincy ===
Aminul was first appointed as the national team captain in October 2006, following the international retirement of Arif Khan Joy. He led the team during matches against Uzbekistan and Hong Kong, both of which ended in heavy defeats. He missed the entirety of 2007 due to an injury but returned to the national side for the 2008 AFC Challenge Cup qualifiers held in Bishkek, Kyrgyzstan, during which the team was captained by Hassan Al-Mamun.

Aminul once again served as captain during the 2008 SAFF Championship held in Colombo, Sri Lanka. However, following a disappointing SAFF campaign, the BFF removed Aminul from his captaincy, which was then handed over to Motiur Rahman Munna for the 2008 Merdeka Cup and 2008 Myanmar Challenge Cup.

In April 2009, Aminul was once again made captain under newly appointed head coach Dido, for the 2010 AFC Challenge Cup qualifiers. He led the team to successful qualification with victories over Cambodia and Macau. Following Dido's controversial departure prior to the 2009 SAFF Championship, Aminul led the team to a semi-final finish under interim coach Shahidur Rahman Shantoo. He eventually captained the Bangladesh U23 which went on to win gold at the 2010 South Asian Games.

Aminul remained the captain of the senior national team during the 2010 AFC Challenge Cup. The tournament ended up being his last with the national team, and in his final senior international game against Sri Lanka on 20 February 2010, Aminul was sent off in a 0–3 defeat as Bangladesh crashed out of the group stage. Heavily criticized, Aminul blamed Sri Lanka's humidity for what was termed one of the country's worst defeats. However, he did represent the U23 team at the 2010 Asian Games in Guangzhou, China.

=== Retirement ===
On 18 June 2010, Aminul announced his retirement from international football. He was loyal to his decision even after the Bangladesh Football Federation requested his presence in the team for the 2014 FIFA World Cup qualification – AFC first round, in June 2011.

== 2003 kidnapping transfer saga ==
"A group comprising five or six young men caught me from Doyel Chattar when my brother and I were on way to Nawabpur to supervise house repairs. Those youths took me straight to the Abahani club office and I had to stay there until 11pm. Then they pushed me into a car and drove to a place I could not recognise because it was dark. When I woke up in the morning I realised that I had been confined at a house in Iqbal Road, Mohammadpur. At around 4pm I decided that I would make my escape and so I jumped from the first floor and ran straight to Hassan Al-Mamun's house at Balur Ghat in Cantonment area. From there I went to Muktijoddha club in Gulistan"

— Aminul Haque, on his alleged kidnapping.

On 11 September 2003, Aminul's brother, Moinul Haque, filed a case with Ramna Thana accusing Abahani Limited Dhaka of kidnapping Aminul. In the early hours of 12 September, police carried out an unprecedented raid on Abahani club in Dhanmondi in search of Aminul but couldn't find him. While a frantic search for him was going on, Aminul popped up at Muktijoddha's central command office in the afternoon, claiming to have been taken to Abahani club at gunpoint and later held captive in a house in Mohammadpur. Aminul also told reporters that he had fled that house by jumping from a first-floor balcony. He also admitted to taking a cheque of Tk 9 lakhs from Abahani as advance payment with a promise that he would join them during the transfer window while making the same commitment to Muktijoddha and also taking the exact amount of money in advance.

Aminul later stated that he would stay at Muktijoddha and had no intentions of leaving the club. It was also reported that he considered quitting the domestic game altogether due to family pressure and countrywide criticism. On 30 September 2003, the one-member probe committee of Col (Retd.) Obayedullah Khan submitted an incomplete report to the Bangladesh Football Federation about Aminul's transfer saga. He accused Aminul and Muktijoddha of not cooperating during the investigation, stating that the custodian was afraid of being suspended due to his actions. Nonetheless, the tug of war soon came to a close after Aminul returned the Tk 9 lakh cheque to Abahani and remained at Muktijoddha.

== Political career ==
Aminul Haque has joined as Dhaka North City unit Member Secretary of the Bangladesh Nationalist Party for some time and during the 2009–2024 regime of Prime Minister Sheikh Hasina, he was arrested on November 1, 2023, on the grounds of two separate incidents of sabotage. He was later released after serving prison time for months, after the Awami League government got toppled he submitted nomination for Dhaka-16 Constituency and he was accepted and Bangladesh Nationalist Party(BNP) nominated him for MP Candidate for Dhaka-16 Constituency.

Haque became the Minister of State for sports and youth in 2026.

== Career statistics ==
=== International ===
Appearances and goals by national team and year
National team	Year	Apps	Goals
Bangladesh
Bangladesh	1998	1	0
Bangladesh	1999	4	0
Bangladesh	2000	4	0
Bangladesh	2001	8	0
Bangladesh	2003	8	0
Bangladesh	2005	6	0
Bangladesh	2006	9	0
Bangladesh	2008	7	0
Bangladesh	2009	6	0
Bangladesh	2010	3	0
Total		56	0

== Honours ==
Mohammedan SC

- Federation Cup: 1995
- DMFA Cup: 1995
- Super Cup: 2009

Muktijoddha Sangsad KC

- Dhaka Premier Division League: 1997–98, 2000
- Mohonagari Cup: 1997
- McDowell's Cup: 1998
- Federation Cup: 2001, 2003
- National League: 2003

Abahani Limited Dhaka

- Federation Cup: 1999
- National League: 2000

Sheikh Jamal Dhanmondi Club

- Bangladesh Premier League: 2010–11
- Federation Cup: 2011–12
- Pokhara Cup: 2011

Bangladesh

- SAFF Championship: 2003

Bangladesh U23

- South Asian Games Gold medal: 2010

Individual

- 2009 Citycell Super Cup Best Goalkeeper Award
