= 2009 Bangladesh Super Cup =

Tournament details
- Host country: Bangladesh
- City: Dhaka
- Dates: 11 March - 27 March 2009
- Teams: 8
- Venue: 1 (in 1 host city)

Final positions
- Champions: Dhaka Mohammedan (1st title)
- Runners-up: Dhaka Abahani
- Third place: Brothers Union
- Fourth place: Chittagong Mohammedan

Tournament statistics
- Matches played: 21
- Goals scored: 57 (2.71 per match)
- Top scorer(s): (Nigeria) Emeka Christian (5 goals)
- Best player: (Bangladesh) Zahid Hasan Ameli
- Best goalkeeper: (Bangladesh) Aminul Haque

The 2009 Bangladesh Super Cup also known as the Citycell Bangladesh Super Cup for sponsorship reasons, was the inaugural edition of the Bangladesh Super Cup. The tournament was organized by the Bangladesh Football Federation and all games were held at the Bangabandhu National Stadium. The winners of the tournament received a prize money of Tk 1cr, earning the tournament the nickname the koti takar khela (Million dollar game).

== Venues ==
Dhaka
Bangabandhu National Stadium
Capacity: 36,000
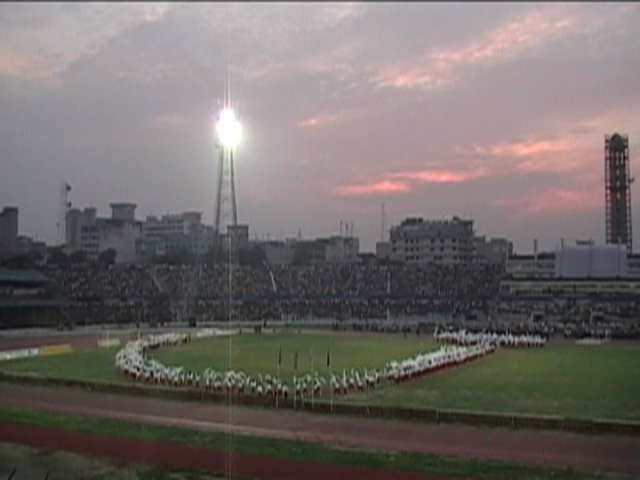

== Participating teams ==
The top eight teams from the 2008–09 B.League were given entry to the tournament.

- Dhaka Abahani: 2008–09 B.League champions
- Dhaka Mohammedan: 2008–09 B.League runners-up
- Sheikh Russel KC: 2008–09 B.League 3rd place
- Brothers Union: 2008–09 B.League 4th place
- Chittagong Mohammedan: 2008–09 B.League 5th place
- Farashganj SC: 2008–09 B.League 6th place
- Rahmatganj MFS: 2008–09 B.League 7th place
- Chittagong Abahani: 2008–09 B.League 8th place

== Prize money ==
- Champion: 1 crore Taka
- Runner-up: 20 lakh Taka
- Third Place: 7 lakh Taka
- Fourth Place: 6 lakh Taka
- Plate winners: 4 lakh Taka
- Plate runners-up: 3 lakh Taka

== Group stage ==
=== Group A ===
Team	Pld	W	D	L	GF	GA	GD	Pts	Qualification
Dhaka Abahani	3	3	0	0	8	1	+7	9	Advance to Knockout stage
Chittagong Mohammedan	3	2	0	1	5	2	+3	6	Advance to Knockout stage
Sheikh Russel KC	3	1	0	2	1	5	−4	3	Advance to Plate Trophy
Rahmatganj MFS	3	0	0	3	0	6	−6	0	Advance to Plate Trophy

Source: archive.bff.com.bd
11 March 2009
16:30 BST (UTC+06:00)

Dhaka Abahani	3–0	Rahmatganj MFS
Emeka Christian 2', 81'; Faisal 58'	Report

Bangabandhu National Stadium, Dhaka
Attendance: 8,000
11 March 2009
18:30 BST (UTC+06:00)

Chittagong Mohammedan	2–0	Sheikh Russel KC
Nasir 19'; Raphael Sagno 54'	Report

Bangabandhu National Stadium, Dhaka

13 March 2009
15:30 BST (UTC+06:00)

Sheikh Russel KC	1–0	Rahmatganj MFS
Vukadin Milunovic 52'	Report

Bangabandhu National Stadium, Dhaka
13 March 2009
17:30 BST (UTC+06:00)

Dhaka Abahani	2–1	Chittagong Mohammedan
Emeka Christian 44', 87'	Report	Raphael Sagno 39'

Bangabandhu National Stadium, Dhaka
Attendance: 10,000
Referee: Azad Rahman (Bangladesh)

15 March 2009
15:30 BST (UTC+06:00)

Chittagong Mohammedan	2–0	Rahmatganj MFS
Raphael Sagno 39', 73'	Report

Bangabandhu National Stadium, Dhaka
15 March 2009
17:30 BST (UTC+06:00)

Dhaka Abahani	3–0	Sheikh Russel KC
Awudu Ibrahim 6'; Ameli 68'; Emeka Christian 89'	Report

Bangabandhu National Stadium, Dhaka

=== Group B ===
Team	Pld	W	D	L	GF	GA	GD	Pts	Qualification
Dhaka Mohammedan	3	2	1	0	6	1	+5	7	Advance to Knockout stage
Brothers Union	3	1	2	0	4	1	+3	5	Advance to Knockout stage
Farashganj SC	3	1	1	1	2	4	−2	4	Advance to Plate Trophy
Chittagong Abahani	3	0	0	3	0	6	−6	0	Advance to Plate Trophy

Source: archive.bff.com.bd
12 March 2009
15:30 BST (UTC+06:00)

Brothers Union	0–0	Farashganj SC
	Report

Bangabandhu National Stadium, Dhaka
12 March 2009
17:30 BST (UTC+06:00)

Dhaka Mohammedan	1–0	Chittagong Abahani
Alamu Bukola 64' (pen.)	Report

Bangabandhu National Stadium, Dhaka

14 March 2009
15:30 BST (UTC+06:00)

Brothers Union	3–0	Chittagong Abahani
Zahid 36'; Henry Quaye 44'; Tapu 63'	Report

Bangabandhu National Stadium, Dhaka
14 March 2009
17:30 BST (UTC+06:00)

Dhaka Mohammedan	4–0	Farashganj SC
Alamu Bukola 45+?' (pen.); Sharif 54', 78'; Arman 90+?'	Report

Bangabandhu National Stadium, Dhaka

16 March 2009
15:30 BST (UTC+06:00)

Farashganj SC	2–0	Chittagong Abahani
Khokon Das 25'; Idris Mutubi 75'	Report

Bangabandhu National Stadium, Dhaka
16 March 2009
17:30 BST (UTC+06:00)

Brothers Union	1–1	Dhaka Mohammedan
Henry Quaye 15'	Report	John Godwin 7'

Bangabandhu National Stadium, Dhaka

== Plate trophy knockout stage ==
=== Semi-final ===
21 March 2009
17:00 BST (UTC+06:00)

Sheikh Russel KC	1–1 (a.e.t.)	Chittagong Abahani
Alfaz 53'	Report	Joshep Romeo 83'
Penalties
Mahmudul Hasan (penalty scored) Rachid Brigeme (penalty scored) Maksudul Alam Bulbul (penalty scored) Alfaz (penalty scored) Vukadin Milunovic (penalty scored)	5–3	Sayedul Haque (penalty scored) Banei Othelo (penalty scored) Tommy (penalty scored) Md Emon (penalty missed)

Bangabandhu National Stadium, Dhaka
Referee: Tayeb Shamsuzzaman (Bangladesh)

22 March 2009
17:00 BST (UTC+06:00)

Farashganj SC	0–0 (a.e.t.)	Rahmatganj MFS
	Report
Penalties
Emeka Luccky (penalty scored) Kabir Hossain (penalty scored) Khokon Das (penalty scored) Enamul (penalty scored) Mamun (penalty scored)	5–3	Jahangir Patwary (penalty scored) Idris Kaseriy (penalty scored) Mostafa Kaba (penalty scored) Onyeokoro Felix (penalty missed)

Bangabandhu National Stadium, Dhaka
Referee: Abdul Hannan Miron (Bangladesh)

=== Final ===
25 March 2009
17:00 BST (UTC+06:00)

Farashganj SC	1–0	Sheikh Russel KC
Enamul 58'	Report

Bangabandhu National Stadium, Dhaka
Referee: Abdul Hannan Miron (Bangladesh)

== Super Cup knockout stage ==
=== Semi-final ===
19 March 2009
17:00 BST (UTC+06:00)

Dhaka Abahani	3–2	Brothers Union
Awudu Ibrahim 16'; Ameli 79', 81'	Report	Henry Quaye 42'; Shakil 61'

Bangabandhu National Stadium, Dhaka
Attendance: 10,000
Referee: Tayeb Shamsuzzaman (Bangladesh)
23 March 2009
17:00 BST (UTC+06:00)

Brothers Union	0–0	Dhaka Abahani
	Report

Bangabandhu National Stadium, Dhaka
Referee: Abdur Rahman (Qatar)

Dhaka Abahani won 3–2 on aggregate.

20 March 2009
17:00 BST (UTC+06:00)

Dhaka Mohammedan	1–0	Chittagong Mohammedan
Alamu Bukola 89'	Report

Bangabandhu National Stadium, Dhaka
Attendance: 15,000
Referee: Azad Rahman (Bangladesh)
24 March 2009
17:00 BST (UTC+06:00)

Chittagong Mohammedan	1–0 (a.e.t.)	Dhaka Mohammedan
Akbor Hossain Ridon 79'	Report
Penalties
Camara Saifullah (penalty missed) Nasir (penalty missed) Pavel Mahmud (penalty missed) Showkat Khan (penalty scored) Raphael Sagno (penalty scored)	2–3	John Godwin (penalty missed) Dami Emmanuelle (penalty missed) Maruf Ahmed (penalty scored) Sharif (penalty scored) Hazem Mahmud (penalty scored)

Bangabandhu National Stadium, Dhaka
Referee: Abdur Rahman (Qatar)

1–1 on aggregate. Dhaka Mohammedan won 3–2 on penalties.

=== Third-place ===
27 March 2009
15:00 BST (UTC+06:00)

Brothers Union	3–1	Chittagong Mohammedan
Henry Quaye 10'; Liton 62' (pen.); Tapu 80'	Report	Raphael Sagno 1'

Bangabandhu National Stadium, Dhaka
Referee: Azad Rahman (Bangladesh)

=== Final ===
27 March 2009
17:00 BST (UTC+06:00)

Dhaka Mohammedan	1–0	Dhaka Abahani
John Godwin 21'	Report

Bangabandhu National Stadium, Dhaka
Attendance: 44,000
Referee: Alireza Faghani (Iran)

== Annual awards ==
=== Individual ===
Award	Player	Club	Reward	Ref.
Highest Scorer	Emeka Christian	Dhaka Abahani		
Most valuable player	Zahid Hasan Ameli	Dhaka Abahani		
Best goalkeeper	Aminul Haque	Dhaka Mohammedan	1 lakh Taka	
Best referee	Abdul Hannan Miron		50,000 Taka	

=== Prize Money ===
Position	Club	Prize money	Ref.
Champions	Dhaka Mohammedan	1 crore Taka	
Runners-up	Dhaka Abahani	20 lakh Taka	
Third place	Brothers Union	7 lakh Taka	
Fourth place	Chittagong Mohammedan	6 lakh Taka	
Plate winners	Farashganj SC	4 lakh Taka	
Plate runners-up	Sheikh Russel KC	3 lakh Taka	
