= 2011 Bangladesh Super Cup =

Tournament details
- Host country: Bangladesh
- City: Dhaka
- Dates: 8 July - 6 August 2011
- Teams: 6
- Venue: 1 (in 1 host city)

Final positions
- Champions: Dhaka Abahani (1st title)
- Runners-up: Dhaka Mohammedan

Tournament statistics
- Matches played: 9
- Goals scored: 30 (3.33 per match)
- Top scorer(s): (Nigeria) Sunday Chizoba (5 goals)

The 2011 Bangladesh Super Cup also known as the Grameenphone Bangladesh Super Cup for sponsorship reasons, was the second edition of the Bangladesh Super Cup. The tournament was organized by the Bangladesh Football Federation and all games were held at the Bangabandhu National Stadium. The winners of the tournament received a prize money of Tk 1cr.

== Venues ==
Dhaka
Bangabandhu National Stadium
Capacity: 36,000
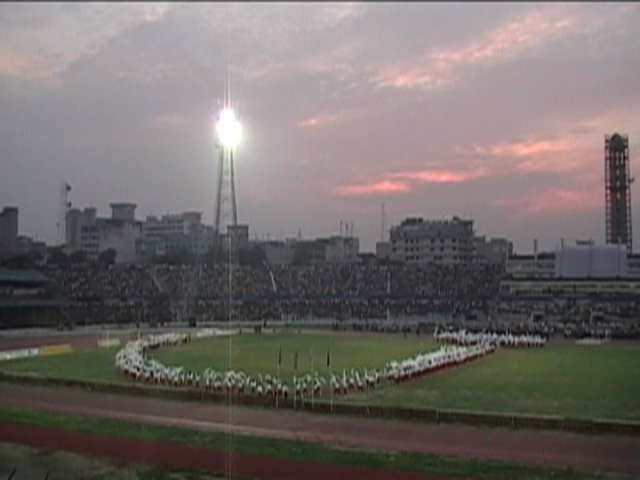

== Participating teams ==
The top six teams from the 2010–11 Bangladesh League were given entry to the tournament.

- Sheikh Jamal Dhanmondi Club: 2010–11 Bangladesh League champions
- Muktijoddha Sangsad KC: 2010–11 Bangladesh League runners-up
- Sheikh Russel KC: 2010–11 Bangladesh League 3rd place
- Dhaka Abahani: 2008–09 B.League 4th place
- Brothers Union: 2010–11 Bangladesh League 5th place
- Dhaka Mohammedan: 2010–11 Bangladesh League 6th place

== Prize money ==
- Champion: 1 crore Taka
- Runner-up: 20 lakh Taka

== Group stage ==
=== Group A ===
Team	Pld	W	D	L	GF	GA	GD	Pts	Qualification
Sheikh Jamal DC	2	1	1	0	6	1	+5	4	Advance to Knockout stage
Dhaka Abahani	2	0	2	0	0	0	0	2	Advance to Knockout stage
Brothers Union	2	0	1	1	1	6	−5	1	

Source: archive.bff.com.bd
8 July 2011
16:00 BST (UTC+06:00)

Sheikh Jamal DC	6–1	Brothers Union
Emmanuel Ayuk 29'; Meshu 64'; Ameli 83'; Femi Orunimi 87'; Stephen Loga Bouga 51', 90+3'	Report	Everton Souza 77' (pen.)

Bangabandhu National Stadium, Dhaka
Attendance: 3,000
Referee: Abdul Hannan Miron

11 July 2011
16:00 BST (UTC+06:00)

Dhaka Abahani	0–0	Brothers Union
	Report

Bangabandhu National Stadium, Dhaka
Referee: Mijanur Rahman

13 July 2011
16:00 BST (UTC+06:00)

Sheikh Jamal DC	0–0	Dhaka Abahani
	Report

Bangabandhu National Stadium, Dhaka
Referee: Azad Rahman

=== Group B ===
Team	Pld	W	D	L	GF	GA	GD	Pts	Qualification
Muktijoddha Sangsad KC	2	1	1	0	4	3	+1	4	Advance to Knockout stage
Dhaka Mohammedan	2	0	2	0	3	3	0	2	Advance to Knockout stage
Sheikh Russel KC	2	0	1	1	2	3	−1	1	

Source: archive.bff.com.bd
9 July 2011
16:00 BST (UTC+06:00)

Muktijoddha Sangsad	2–2	Dhaka Mohammedan
Alamu Bukola 45+2'; Mithun 51'	Report	Sunday 8'; Abdul Hamid Bashani 12'

Bangabandhu National Stadium, Dhaka

12 July 2011
16:00 BST (UTC+06:00)

Sheikh Russel KC	1–1	Dhaka Mohammedan
Bangoura 44'	Report	Sabuz 44'

Bangabandhu National Stadium, Dhaka

12 July 2011
16:00 BST (UTC+06:00)

Muktijoddha Sangsad	2–1	Sheikh Russel KC
Mithun 45+1'; Alamu Bukola 67'	Report	Effiong Duke 33'

Bangabandhu National Stadium, Dhaka
Referee: Abdul Hannan Miron

== Knockout stage ==
The tournament knockout stages were held after the 2014 FIFA World Cup qualification – AFC first round.

=== Semi-final ===
2 August 2011
15:30 BST (UTC+06:00)

Sheikh Jamal DC	2–4	Dhaka Mohammedan
Stephen Loga Bouga 69'; Sujan 71' (pen.)	Report	Sunday 11' (pen.), 34', 90+?'; Nuche Francis 66'

Bangabandhu National Stadium, Dhaka

3 August 2011
15:30 BST (UTC+06:00)

Dhaka Abahani	2–2	Muktijoddha Sangsad
Mohamed Robin 20', 63'	Report	Alamu Bukola 12'; Zahid Parvez 48'
Penalties
Samad Yousuf (penalty scored) Abul (penalty scored) Cletus Blamo (penalty scored) Alfaz (penalty scored) Rony (penalty scored)	5–4	Paul Dammi (penalty scored) Nasiruddin (penalty scored) Arman (penalty scored) Alamu Bukola (penalty scored) Alamgir Kabir (penalty missed)

Bangabandhu National Stadium, Dhaka
Referee: Abdul Hannan Miron

=== Final ===
6 August 2011
15:30 BST (UTC+06:00)

Dhaka Abahani	2–2	Dhaka Mohammedan
Twum Frank 35', 75'	Report	Sunday 22'; Sabuz 31'
Penalties
Cletus Blamo (penalty scored); Alfaz (penalty missed); Rony (penalty scored); Twum Frank (penalty missed); Linkon (penalty scored)	3–2	Sunday (penalty scored); Baybeck Fombagne (penalty missed); Abdul Hamid Bashani (penalty scored); Nuche Francis (penalty missed); Uringmin Amani (penalty missed)

Bangabandhu National Stadium, Dhaka
Attendance: 15,000
Referee: Abdul Hannan Miron
