= Haveeru Sports Awards (football) =

Sport award show

Haveeru Sports Awards is run by the Maldivian daily news magazine, Haveeru. It stopped after Haveeru was shut down and its successor is the Mihaaru Awards, which is hosted by the Maldivian news magazine, Mihaaru.

== Golden Boot Award ==
Year	Player
1994	(Romania) Victor Stanoiu
1995	(Republic of the Congo) Patrick Chikaya
1996	(Maldives) Adam Abdul Latheef
1997	(Maldives) Mohamed Vildaan
1998	(Maldives) Shah Ismail
1999	(Maldives) Shah Ismail
2000	(Maldives) Ali Umar
2001	(Maldives) Ali Shiham
2002	(Maldives) Ali Shiham
2003	(Maldives) Ali Ashfaq
2004	(Maldives) Ali Ashfaq
2005	(Maldives) Ali Ashfaq
2006	(Maldives) Ibrahim Fazeel
2007	(Maldives) Ibrahim Fazeel (18 goals)
2008	(Maldives) Ali Ashfaq
2009	(Maldives) Ali Ashfaq
2010	(Maldives) Ali Ashfaq (30 goals)
2011	(Maldives) Ibrahim Fazeel (29 goals)

== Footballer of the Year ==
Year	Player
1995	(Maldives) Adam Abdul Latheef
1996	(Maldives) Mohamed Ibrahim
1997	(Maldives) Abdulla Ibrahim
1998	(Maldives) Shah Ismail
1999	(Maldives) Ali Shiham
2000	(Maldives) Adam Abdul Latheef
2001	(Maldives) Ali Shiham
2002	(Maldives) Mohamed Nizam
2003	(Maldives) Ali Ashfaq
2004	(Maldives) Assad Abdul Ghanee
2005	(Maldives) Ibrahim Fazeel
2006	(Maldives) Ali Umar
2007	(Maldives) Ali Ashfaq
2008	(Maldives) Mukhthar Naseer
2009	(Maldives) Ali Ashfaq
2010	(Maldives) Mohamed Arif
2011	(Maldives) Ali Ashfaq

== Referee of the Year ==
Year	Referee
2005	(Maldives) Ahmed Ameez
2006	(Maldives) Riyaz Rasheed
2007	NA
2008	(Maldives) Ahmed Ameez
2009	(Maldives) Ahmed Ameez
2010	NA
2011	(Maldives) Mohamed Fareed

== Coach of the Year ==
Year	Coach
2005	(Bulgaria) Yordan Ivanov Stoikov
2006	(Maldives) Mauroof Ahmed
2007	(Maldives) Mauroof Ahmed
2008	(Hungary) László Kiss
2009	(Maldives) Ali Suzain
2010	(Turkey) Bahtiyar Can Vanlı
2011	(Turkey) Bahtiyar Can Vanlı

== Under 21 Player of the Year ==
Year	Player
2010	(Maldives) Ali Nafiu
2011	(Maldives) Assadhulla Abdulla
