= 2025–26 Bangladesh Super Cup =

4th season of the Bangladesh Super Cup

Tournament details
- Host country: Bangladesh
- City: Dhaka
- Dates: 10–23 January 2026
- Teams: 4
- Venue: 1 (in 1 host city)

The 2025–26 Bangladesh Super Cup is the 4th edition of the Bangladesh Super Cup, the main domestic annual top-tier clubs football tournament organized by Bangladesh Football Federation (BFF). The four participants will competes in the tournament.

Dhaka Mohammedan is the defending champion having defeated Sheikh Russel KC by 1(4)–1(2) goals penalties shoot-out in the final on 25 June 2013.

== Format ==
Top four teams from the standings of the last season 2024–25 Bangladesh Premier League table will play directly. In the first semi-final, league winners will play against 4th place team and league runners-up will play against 3rd place team in the second semi-final. The winners of semi-finals will play in the final.

== Participating clubs ==
The following four clubs will participate in the tournament.

Team	Method of qualification	Appearances in the Bangladesh Super Cup	Previous best performance
Mohammedan Sporting Club	2024–25 BPL winners	4th	Winners (2009, 2013)
Dhaka Abahani	2024–25 BPL runners-up	3rd	Winners (2011)
Bashundhara Kings	2024–25 BPL 3rd place	Debut	–
Rahmatganj	2024–25 BPL 4th place	Debut	–

== Venue ==
The venue of the tournament has not confirmed yet.

== Draw ==
The draw ceremony date of the tournament yet to announced.
