= Motiur Rahman Munna =

Bangladeshi footballer

Motiur Munna
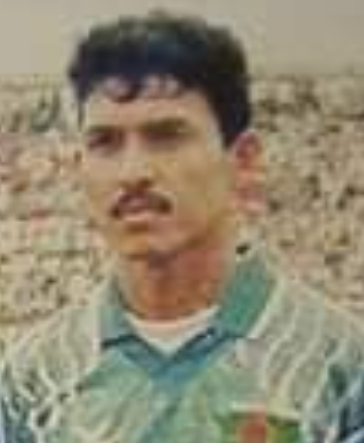
- Munna with Bangladesh at the 1999 SA Games

Personal information
- Full name: Motiur Rahman Munna
- Date of birth: 1 September 1979 (age 47)
- Place of birth: Chittagong, Bangladesh
- Height: 1.75 m (5 ft 9 in)
- Positions: Central midfielder; left-back

Senior career*
Years	Team	Apps	(Gls)
1993–1994	Sadharan Bima		
1995–1996	Agrani Bank		
1997–2001	Mohammedan		
2001–2004	Muktijoddha		
2005–2006	Mohammedan		
2007–2008	Muktijoddha		(2)
2008–2009	Brothers Union		(2)
2009–2010	Dhaka Abahani		(2)
2010–2012	Muktijoddha	19	(2)
2012–2013	Mohammedan		

International career
1998	Bangladesh U19		
2002–2006	Bangladesh U23		
1998–2009	Bangladesh	50	(2)
Medal record
Representing Bangladesh
Men's football
South Asian Games
Gold medal – first place	1999 Kathmandu
SAFF Championship
Runner-up	1999 India
Winner	2003 Bangladesh
Runner-up	2005 Pakistan
- * Club domestic league appearances and goals

Motiur Rahman Munna (Bengali: মতিউর রহমান মুন্না; born 1 September 1979) is a retired Bangladeshi professional footballer who played as a central-midfielder. He played for the Bangladesh national team from 1998 to 2009. Munna began his 20-year club career in Dhaka with Sadharan Bima CSC in 1993. During his illustrious career he notably played for Mohammedan SC, Muktijoddha Sangsad KC, Brothers Union and Abahani Limited Dhaka.

== Early career ==
Motiur Rahman Munna was born on 1 September 1979, in Chittagong, Bangladesh. He began his football career with Agrabad Naogaon in the Chittagong First Division League. In 1993, he earned a direct opportunity to play in the Dhaka Premier Division League for Sadharan Bima CSC.

== Club career ==
Munna represented both Sadharan Bima CSC and Agrani Bank SC before getting his big move to Mohammedan SC. In 1999, he played an integral role in helping the Black and Whites win the Dhaka Premier Division League and India's All Airlines Gold Cup. In 2001, he transferred to Muktijoddha Sangsad KC, where he won the Federation Cup in both 2001 and 2003. He was appointed club captain in 2004 and represented the Freedom Fighters at the 2004 AFC Cup.

In 2005, he returned to Mohammedan and notably scored a brace in a 2–0 victory over Muktijoddha, in a season where Mohammedan finished league runners-up. Munna represented Muktijoddha during the 2007 B.League. He also spent a season with Brothers Union the following year. In 2009, he joined Abahani Limited Dhaka prior to the 2009–10 Bangladesh League, and helped Abahani defend the league while simultaneously winning his first professional league title. In 2010, he transferred to Muktijoddha, as the club finished runners-up in the 2010–11 Bangladesh League.

In 2012, Munna returned to Mohammedan for his third and final stint at the club and captained the team during the 2012–13 Bangladesh Premier League.

== International career ==
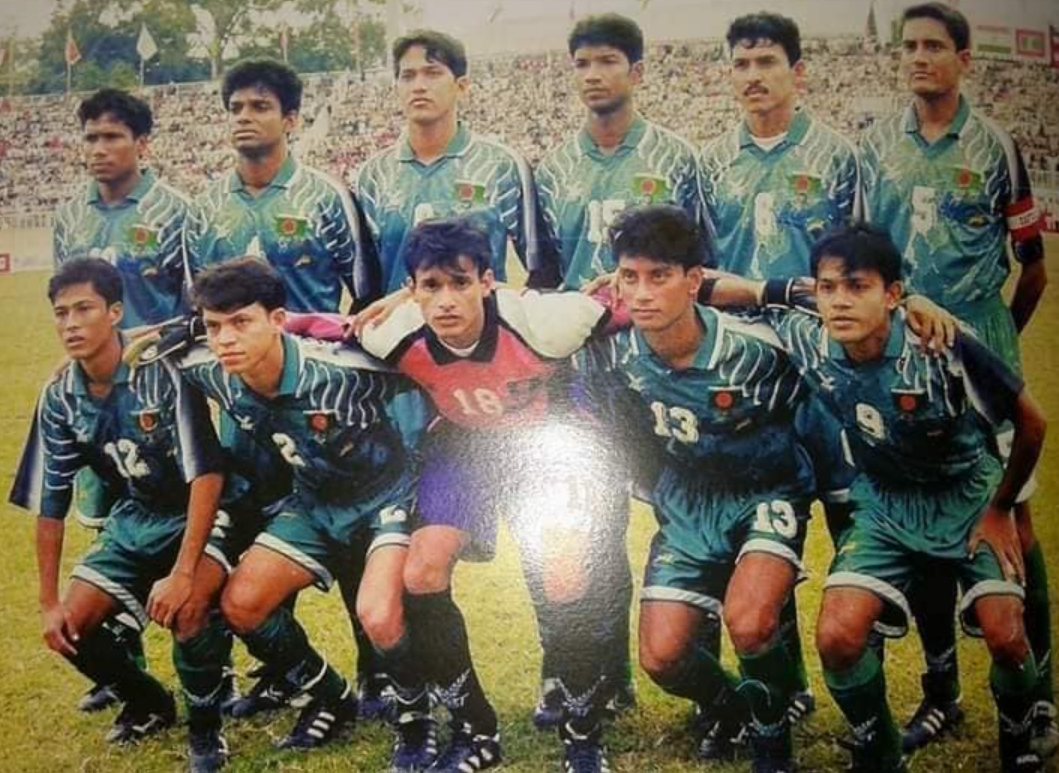
Munna (standing second from right) with the Bangladesh national team during the 1999 SA Games final

In 1998, he represented the Bangladesh U19 team during the 1998 AFC Youth Championship qualifiers held in Sri Lanka. In the same year, he made his debut for the Bangladesh national team against Qatar during an exhibition match held in Doha. He remained in the team during both the 1999 SAFF Gold Cup and 1999 South Asian Games, playing as a left-back and helping Bangladesh win their maiden gold medal during the latter. Munna's first senior international goal came during the 2000 AFC Asian Cup qualifiers against Sri Lanka on 24 November 1999.

Munna also represented the team during both the 2002 Asian Games and 2006 Asian Games. For the senior national team, he was a regular figure during the Millennium Super Soccer Cup and 2002 FIFA World Cup qualifiers. Asutrian coach, György Kottán, kept him in the national squad for the 2003 SAFF Gold Cup, despite Munna picking up a suspension after getting into a brawl during a league fixture. He played an integral role in Bangladesh's SAFF Gold Cup triumph, scoring a Golden Goal against India in the semi-final extra time which helped Bangladesh advance into the finals of the tournament.

Munna was also part of the national team during their runners-up finish in the 2005 SAFF Gold Cup. He eventually served as the national team captain in 2008 and led the country during both the 2008 Myanmar Grand Royal Challenge Cup and 2008 Merdeka Tournament. He announced his retirement from international football on 17 June 2011.

== Personal life ==
Following his retirement from football, Munna became a full-fledged businessmen.

In 2013, the same year as his retirement, he was arrested due to a domestic violence case filed against him by his wife.

== Career statistics ==
=== International apps ===
Appearances and goals by national team and year
National team	Year	Apps	Goals
Bangladesh
Bangladesh	1998	1	0
Bangladesh	1999	12	1
Bangladesh	2000	4	0
Bangladesh	2001	8	0
Bangladesh	2003	8	1
Bangladesh	2005	7	0
Bangladesh	2006	6	0
Bangladesh	2008	3	0
Bangladesh	2009	1	0
Bangladesh	Total	50	2

=== International goals ===
==== Youth ====
Scores and results list Bangladesh's goal tally first

#	Date	Venue	Opponent	Score	Result	Competition
1.	29 May 1998	Bogambara Stadium, Sri Lanka	Kazakhstan		3–2	1998 AFC Youth Championship qualification
2.	29 May 1998	Bogambara Stadium, Sri Lanka	Kazakhstan		3–2	1998 AFC Youth Championship qualification
3.	5 December 2006	Al-Gharrafa Stadium, Saudi Arabia	Vietnam	1–1	1–5	2006 Asian Games

==== Senior ====
Scores and results list Bangladesh's goal tally first

#	Date	Venue	Opponent	Score	Result	Competition
1.	25 November 1999	Tahnoun bin Mohammed Stadium, UAE	Sri Lanka	2–1	3–1	2000 AFC Asian Cup qualification
2.	18 January 2003	Bangabandhu National Stadium, Bangladesh	India	2–1	2–1	2003 SAFF Gold Cup

== Honours ==
Mohammedan SC

- Dhaka Premier Division League: 1999
- All Airlines Gold Cup: 1999
- National League: 2005–06

Muktijoddha Sangsad KC

- National League: 2003
- Federation Cup: 2001, 2003

Abahani Limited Dhaka

- Bangladesh Premier League: 2009–10

Bangladesh

- South Asian Games Gold medal: 1999
- SAFF Championship: 2003

=== Awards and accolades ===
- 2003 − Sports Writers Association's Best Footballer Award
