= National Institute of Youth Development =

Government organisation based in Savar, Bangladesh

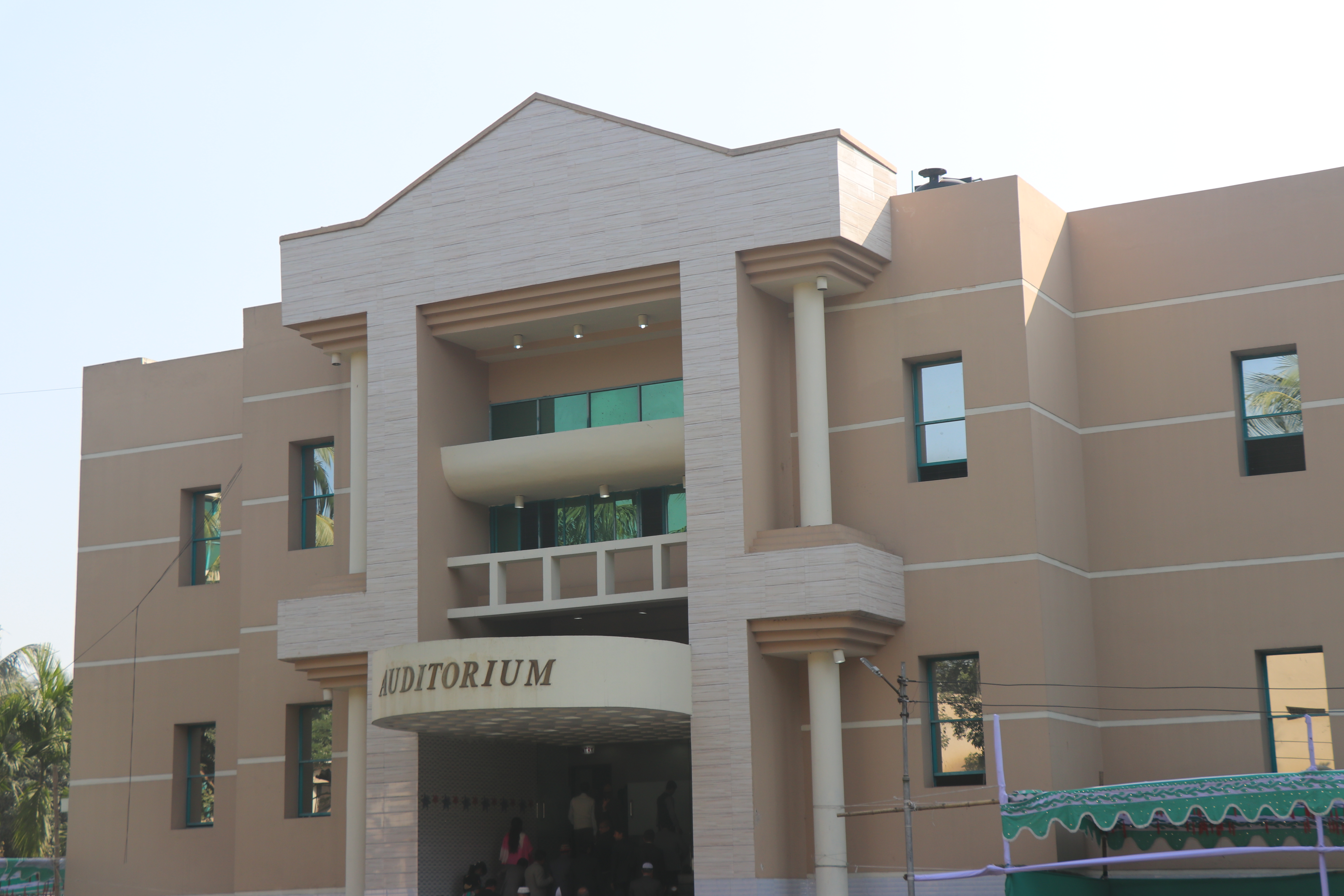
- Formation: 1998 (officially in 2017)
- Headquarters: Savar, Bangladesh
- Coordinates: 23°52′54.1″N 90°16′25.17″E
- Region served: Bangladesh
- Official language: Bengali

The National Institute of Youth Development (Bengali: জাতীয় যুব উন্নয়ন ইনস্টিটিউট; formerly known as Sheikh Hasina National Youth Centre) is a state-owned national research institute that researches youth education and is located in Savar, Bangladesh. The institute provides training to athletes and carries out research.

== History ==
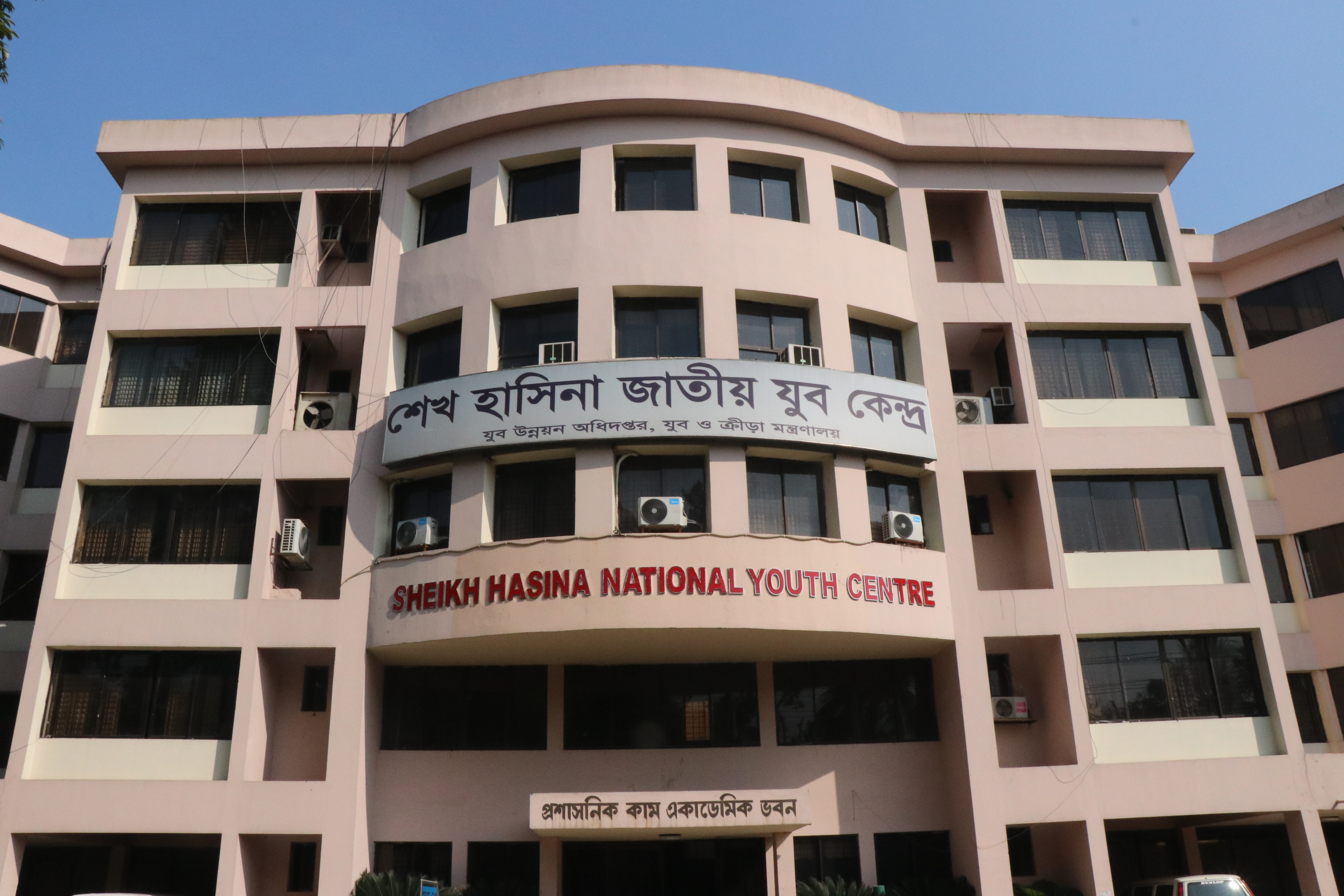
National Institute of Youth Development academic building

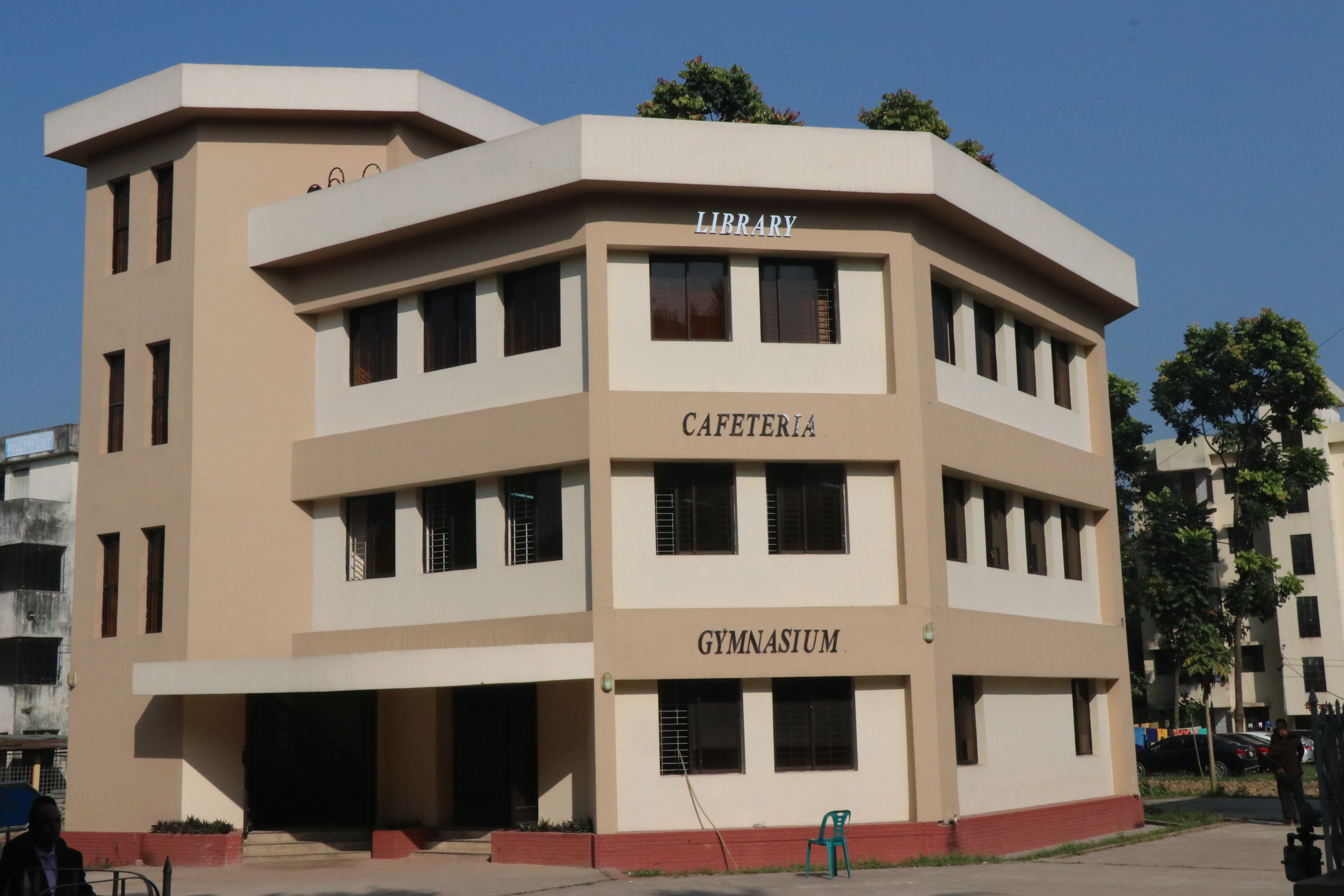
National Institute of Youth Development library, cafeteria and gymnasium building

Sheikh Hasina National Youth Centre was established in 1998. In February 2017, the Cabinet of Bangladesh approved the Sheikh Hasina National Youth Development Centre Act-2017 to turn it into an institute. The centre would be governed by an executive council. It is under the Department of Youth Development of the Ministry of Youth and Sports. It was originally named after former Prime Minister Sheikh Hasina.

=== Renaming ===
On August 27, 2024 the Government (Ministry of Law, Justice, and Parliamentary Affairs) removed Sheikh Hasina's name from the institute, and named it to National Institute of Youth Development, due to Sheikh Hasina's name being linked to the July massacre in Bangladesh.
