= Mamun Khan =

Bangladeshi footballer

Personal information
- Full name: Mohammed Mamun Khan
- Date of birth: 20 December 1985 (age 40)
- Place of birth: Brahmanbaria, Bangladesh
- Height: 1.86 m (6 ft 1 in)
- Position: Goalkeeper

Senior career*
Years	Team	Apps	(Gls)
2001–2004	BRTC SC		(0)
2004–2006	Muktijoddha Sangsad		(0)
2006–2007	Farashganj SC		(0)
2008–2011	Chittagong Mohammedan		(0)
2011	Sheikh Russel KC		(0)
2011–12	Muktijoddha Sangsad		(0)
2012–13	Sheikh Russel KC		(0)
2013–15	Dhaka Mohammedan		(0)
2015–16	Sheikh Russel KC		(0)
2016	Muktijoddha Sangsad		(0)
2017	Sheikh Russel KC	0	(0)
2017–19	Dhaka Mohammedan	15	(0)
2019	Sheikh Russel KC	1	(0)
2019–2021	Sheikh Jamal DC	2	(0)
2021–2022	Muktijoddha Sangsad	0	(0)

International career^{‡}
2011–2013	Bangladesh	10	(0)
- * Club domestic league appearances and goals as of 22 February 2022 ‡ National team caps and goals as of 5 September 2013

Mamun Khan (Bengali: মামুন খান; born 20 December 1985) is a retired Bangladeshi professional footballer who last played as a goalkeeper for Muktijoddha Sangsad KC in the Bangladesh Premier League. He also played for the Bangladesh football team from 2011 to 2013. He began his professional league career with Farashganj SC in 2007, before moving to Chittagong Mohammedan the following year.

== Club career ==
Having started his career with BRTC Sporting Club in the Dhaka First Division League, Mamun made his B.League debut with Farashganj SC during its inaugural season. Mamun's most memorable moment in club football was winning the 2013 Super Cup with Dhaka Mohammedan. He helped Mohammedan win trophy by producing two saves during the penalty shootout in the finals against his former club Sheikh Russel KC. The Super Cup was his first professional silverware. His penalty saving ability was again put into display, when he helped Mohammedan defeat Feni SC on penalties, in the 2014 Modhumoti Bank Independence Cup final.

== International career ==
On 21 March 2011, Mamun made his debut for Bangladesh in international football by participating in the group stage match of the 2012 AFC Challenge Cup qualifiers against Palestine. He was included in the starting XI of that match; Bangladesh lost the match 2–0. In his inaugural year for Bangladesh, Mamun played a total of 5 matches.

== Honours ==
Dhaka Mohammedan

- Super Cup: 2013
