= Ariful Kabir Farhad =

Bangladeshi footballer

Personal information
- Full name: Ariful Kabir Farhad
- Date of birth: 12 March 1980 (age 46)
- Place of birth: Chittagong, Bangladesh
- Height: 1.65 m (5 ft 5 in)
- Position: Striker

Senior career*
Years	Team	Apps	(Gls)
1995–1996	Dhaka Abahani		
1997–2000	Farashganj SC		
2000	→ Chittagong Abahani (loan)		
2000–2002	Muktijoddha Sangsad		
2002–2004	Dhaka Mohammedan		
2005–2006	Dhaka Abahani		
2007	Dhaka Mohammedan		
2008	Brothers Union		
2009–2011	Chittagong Mohammedan		

International career
1995–2006	Bangladesh	15	(5)
Medal record
Representing Bangladesh
Men's football
SAFF Championship
Winner	2003 Bangladesh
Runner-up	2005 Pakistan
- * Club domestic league appearances and goals

Ariful Kabir Farhad (Bengali: আরিফুল কবির ফরহাদ; born 12 March 1980) is a retired Bangladeshi professional footballer who played as a centre forward. He played for the Bangladesh national team from 1995 to 2006.

== International career ==
In 1995, Farhad made his Bangladesh national team debut during the 4-nation Tiger Trophy in Myanmar. Farhad scored his first goal for Bangladesh against Bhutan during the 2003 SAFF Gold Cup group stages. He managed to get a brace in that game as Bangladesh won 3–0 and topped their group. Farhad also scored twice against Bhutan during the 2005 SAFF Gold Cup. On 16 August 2006, Farhad played his last game for Bangladesh during a 4–1 defeat to Qatar.

== Career statistics ==
=== International ===
Bangladesh
Year	Apps	Goals
1995	1	0
2003	7	3
2005	5	2
2006	2	0
Total	15	5

Scores and results list Bangladesh's goal tally first

List of international goals scored by Ariful Kabir Farhad
No.	Date	Venue	Opponent	Score	Result	Competition
1.	15 January 2003	Bangabandhu National Stadium, Dhaka, Bangladesh	Bhutan	1–0	3–0	2003 SAFF Gold Cup
2.	15 January 2003	Bangabandhu National Stadium, Dhaka, Bangladesh	Bhutan	2–0	3–0	2003 SAFF Gold Cup
3.	27 March 2003	Mong Kok Stadium, Kowloon, Hong Kong	Laos	1–2	1–2	2004 AFC Asian Cup qualification
4.	8 December 2005	Peoples Football Stadium, Karachi, Pakistan	Bhutan	1–0	3–0	2005 SAFF Gold Cup
5.	8 December 2005	Peoples Football Stadium, Karachi, Pakistan	Bhutan	2–0	3–0	2005 SAFF Gold Cup

== Personal life ==
After retirement, Farhad represented his hometown Chittagong District football team and also played in the M Agency Veteran Football Tournament, with Chittagong Masters Club.

== Honours ==
Muktijoddha Sangsad KC

- Dhaka Premier Division League: 2000
- Federation Cup: 2001

Dhaka Mohammedan

- Dhaka Premier Division League: 2002
- Federation Cup: 2002

Abahanai Limited Dhaka

- Independence Day Tournament: 2005

Bangladesh

- SAFF Championship: 2003
- 4-nation Tiger Trophy: 1995
