= Ali Umar =

Maldivian footballer (born 1980)

Personal information
- Date of birth: 5 August 1980 (age 46)
- Place of birth: Malé, Maldives
- Height: 1.78 m (5 ft 10 in)
- Positions: Midfielder; forward

Team information
- Current team: New Radiant
- Number: 10

Youth career
- Ameer Ahmed School
- Youth Sports Club

Senior career*
Years	Team	Apps	(Gls)
1996–1997	Youth Sports Club		
1998–2004	Club Valencia		
2005	Island		
2006	New Radiant		
2007–2011	VB Sports		
2012–2013	New Radiant		

International career
1999–2013	Maldives	43	(12)
- * Club domestic league appearances and goals

Ali Umar (Dhivehi: އަލީ އުމަރު; born 5 August 1980) is a Maldivian former professional footballer until his retirement in 2013.

== Post-playing career ==
After he retired, he became a member of the Normalization Committee appointed by FIFA to Football Association of Maldives (FAM) from 2 December 2014 to 31 May 2016. Later he was elected to vice president and as an executive committee member for Football Association of Maldives. On 27 March 2018 to 22 May 2019 he was the Commissioner of Sports of Maldives.

He was also a member of the national football team until his retirement in 2013. He was appointed as FAM's deputy secretary in 2019 and was appointed as the South Asian Football Federation (SAFF) vice president in 2023.

== Career statistics ==
=== International ===
Appearances and goals by national team and year
National team	Year	Apps	Goals
Maldives	1999	1	0
Maldives	2000	2	0
Maldives	2001	6	2
Maldives	2002	1	0
Maldives	2003	9	5
Maldives	2004	5	1
Maldives	2005	4	2
Maldives	2006	–	
Maldives	2007	2	0
Maldives	2008	6	0
Maldives	2009	3	0
Maldives	2010	–	
Maldives	2011	–	
Maldives	2012	–	
Maldives	2013	4	2
Total		43	12

Scores and results list the Maldives' goal tally first, score column indicates score after each Umar goal.

List of international goals scored by Ali Umar
No.	Date	Venue	Opponent	Score	Result	Competition
1	1 April 2001	National Football Stadium, Malé, Maldives	Cambodia	1–0	6–0	2002 FIFA World Cup qualification
2	1 April 2001	National Football Stadium, Malé, Maldives	Cambodia	4–0	6–0	2002 FIFA World Cup qualification
3	11 January 2003	Bangabandhu National Stadium, Dhaka, Bangladesh	Bhutan	6–0	6–0	2003 SAFF Gold Cup
4	15 January 2003	Bangabandhu National Stadium, Dhaka, Bangladesh	Nepal	3–1	3–2	2003 SAFF Gold Cup
5	20 January 2003	Bangabandhu National Stadium, Dhaka, Bangladesh	Bangladesh	1–1	1–1 (a.e.t.) (3–5 p)	2003 SAFF Gold Cup
6	4 March 2003	Jalan Besar Stadium, Kallang, Singapore	Singapore	1–3	1–4	Friendly
7	21 March 2003	National Football Stadium, Malé, Maldives	Brunei	1–0	1–1	2004 AFC Asian Cup qualification
8	8 September 2004	National Football Stadium, Malé, Maldives	Lebanon	2–5	2–5	2006 FIFA World Cup qualification
9	7 December 2005	People's Football Stadium, Karachi, Pakistan	Afghanistan	1–0	9–1	2005 SAFF Gold Cup
10	9 December 2005	People's Football Stadium, Karachi, Pakistan	Sri Lanka	2–0	2–0	2005 SAFF Gold Cup
11	2 September 2013	Dasharath Rangasala, Kathmandu, Nepal	Sri Lanka	10–0	10–0	2013 SAFF Championship
12	4 September 2013	Dasharath Rangasala, Kathmandu, Nepal	Bhutan	8–2	8–2	2013 SAFF Championship

== Honours ==
Maldives

- SAFF Championship: 2008

Individual

- Haveeru Golden Boot Award: 2000
- Haveeru Footballer of the Year: 2006

Preceded by Ibrahim Fazeel	Haveeru Maldivian Footballer of the Year; 2006	Succeeded by ??
Preceded by Ali Shiham	Haveeru Ranboot; 2000	Succeeded by Ali Ashfaq
Preceded by Ibrahim Fazeel	FAM Maldivian Footballer of the Year; 2006	Succeeded by ??
