= Central Human Resource Development Center =

Research centre in Savar, Bangladesh

- Abbreviation: CHRDC
- Formation: 1992
- Headquarters: Savar, Bangladesh
- Region served: Bangladesh
- Official language: Bengali
- Principal: Md. Shalim Khan
- Website: chrdc.gov.bd

Central Human Resource Development Center (Bengali: কেন্দ্রীয় মানব সম্পদ উন্নয়ন কেন্দ্র) is a Bangladesh government owned training and research centre. It is responsible for poverty elevation by providing training to the youth population of Bangladesh. As part of the Digital Bangladesh plan of the government it provides training on topics such as freelancing and outsourcing. Md. Shalim Khan is the principal of the Central Human Resource Development Center.

== History ==
Central Human Resource Development Center was established in 1992 in Savar under the Upazila Resource Development and Employment Project. The government of Bangladesh approved a 391 million taka project to improve and modernize the Central Human Resource Development Center. It is under the Department of Youth Development of the Ministry of Youth and Sports.
