= Directorate of Sports (Bangladesh) =

Government body in Bangladesh

- Formation: 1971
- Headquarters: Dhaka, Bangladesh
- Region served: Bangladesh
- Official language: Bengali
- Website: Directorate of Sports

Directorate of Sports (ক্রীড়া পরিদপ্তর) is a government directorate responsible for sports in Bangladesh and is located in Dhaka, Bangladesh. It is under the Ministry of Youth and Sports.

== History ==
Directorate of Sports is under the Ministry of Youth and Sports, along with National Sports Council and Bangladesh Krira Shikkha Protishtan, manage sports in Bangladesh. It owns a playground in Mohammadpur, Dhaka.
