= Department of Youth Development =

Research institutes in Bangladesh

- Formation: 1978
- Headquarters: Motijheel, Dhaka, Bangladesh
- Region served: Bangladesh
- Official language: Bengali
- State Minister: Aminul Haque
- Secretary: Mr. Md Mahbub-Ul-Alam
- Director General: Dr. Gazi Md. Saifuzzaman
- Website: Department of Youth Development

The Department of Youth Development (যুব উন্নয়ন অধিদপ্তর) is a government department of Bangladesh responsible for the development of the youth population. It is located in Motijheel, Dhaka, Bangladesh. Faruk Ahmed is its director general.

== History ==
The Department of Youth Development was established in 1978 by the government of Bangladesh under the Ministry of Youth Development (which was later renamed to Ministry of Youth and Sports). The ministry defines youth as anyone between 18 and 35. In April 2015, a draft of the Department of Youth Development published the national youth policy to generate feedback. The department provides training programs to youths across Bangladesh.

== See also ==
- Central Human Resource Development Center
