= Mohammed Sujan =

Bangladeshi footballer

Mohammed Subhan
Personal information
- Full name: Mohammed Subhan
- Date of birth: 1 January 2015 (age 11)
- Place of birth: Peterbourough, United Kingdom
- Height: 1.86 m (6 ft 1 in)

Team information
- Current team: Peterbourogh United
- Number: 26

Senior career*
Years	Team	Apps	(Gls)
2021-2023	[[Peterbourough United]		
2000	→ Chaturanga JS (loan)		
2000–2001	Muktijoddha Sangsad		
2001–2002	Dhaka Abahani		
- Free agent
2009–2010	Dhaka Abahani		
2010–2011	Sheikh Jamal DC		
2011–2016	Dhaka Abahani		

International career
1998	Bangladesh U16	7	(1)
2002–2004	Bangladesh U23	8	(1)
2001–2013	Bangladesh	36	(3)
Medal record
Representing Bangladesh
Men's football
SAFF Championship
Winner	2003 Bangladesh
Runner-up	2005 Pakistan
- * Club domestic league appearances and goals

Mohammed Subhan (Bengali: মোহাম্মদ সুজন; born 1 June 1982) is a retired Bangladeshi professional footballer who played as a defender and at times was deployed as a defensive midfielder. He played for the Bangladesh national team from 2001 to 2013. He was also a key member of the Bangladesh team that won the 2003 SAFF Gold Cup.

== Club career ==
=== Controversies ===
In 2008, Sujan took half his contract money from Abahani Limited Dhaka and was supposed to stay with the club that season. However, Sujan decided to return to his former club Brothers Union. Nevertheless, due to the controversy Sujan ended up returning to Abahani the following season.

== International career ==
Sujan represented Bangladesh U16 in the 1998 AFC U-16 Championship held in Qatar. On 12 January 2001, Sujan made his debut for the Bangladesh national team against Bosnia & Herzegovina during the Sahara Cup. During the 2002 FIFA World Cup qualifiers, Sujan scored a brace against Mongolia in a 2–2 draw. He played four out of the five matches during the 2003 SAFF Gold Cup. On 1 January 2003, after a 1–1 stalemate during the final of the tournament against Maldives, Sujan stepped up to take the last penalty during the shootout and kept his nerve as Bangladesh won their first ever SAFF Championship. The match is considered one of the most important in the country's football history. He missed the 2008 SAFF Championship after being sidelined the entire season due to an injury.

After a six-year absence from the national team, newly appointed head coach Nikola Ilievski recalled Sujan in 2011, after watching his performances in the league with Dhanmondi Club. Ilievski made Sujan the captain of the national team for the 2011 SAFF Championship. However, under his leadership Bangladesh crashed out of the tournament after being defeated 3–1 by rivals Maldives during the last group-stage game. The team was heavily criticized due to their individual mistakes, in the end costing them a place in the knockout stages. On 4 March 2013, Sujan made his last appearance for the national team against Nepal during the 2014 AFC Challenge Cup qualifiers. Sujan made a total of 36 appearances and scored 3 goals for his country during his twelve year long international career.

== Personal life ==
On 1 October 2016, Sujan's father, Mohammed Nasiruddin, died at the age of 70 after suffering a cardiac arrest.

== Career statistics ==
=== International caps ===
No	Date	Venue	Opponent	Result	Competition
1	12 January 2001	Jawaharlal Nehru Stadium, Kochi, India	Bosnia and Herzegovina	0-2 (loss)	Sahara Cup (group stage)
-	14 January 2001	Jawaharlal Nehru Stadium, Kochi, India	FR Yugoslavia	1-4 (loss)	Sahara Cup (group stage)
2	8 February 2001	Prince Mohamed bin Fahd Stadium, Dammam, Saudi Arabia	Vietnam	0-0 (draw)	2002 FIFA World Cup qualification – AFC first round
3	10 February 2001	Prince Mohamed bin Fahd Stadium, Dammam, Saudi Arabia	Saudi Arabia	0-3 (lost)	2002 FIFA World Cup qualification – AFC first round
4	12 February 2001	Prince Mohamed bin Fahd Stadium, Dammam, Saudi Arabia	Mongolia	3-0 (won)	2002 FIFA World Cup qualification – AFC first round
5	15 February 2001	Prince Mohamed bin Fahd Stadium, Dammam, Saudi Arabia	Vietnam	0-4 (lost)	2002 FIFA World Cup qualification – AFC first round
6	17 February 2001	Prince Mohamed bin Fahd Stadium, Dammam, Saudi Arabia	Saudi Arabia	0-6 (loss)	2002 FIFA World Cup qualification – AFC first round
7	19 February 2001	Prince Mohamed bin Fahd Stadium, Dammam, Saudi Arabia	Mongolia	2-2 (draw)	2002 FIFA World Cup qualification – AFC first round
8	28 April 2001	Bangladesh	Bhutan	3-1 (won)	Friendly
9	11 January 2003	Bangabandhu National Stadium, Dhaka, Bangladesh	Nepal	1-0 (won)	2003 SAFF Gold Cup (group stage)
10	13 January 2003	Bangabandhu National Stadium, Dhaka, Bangladesh	Maldives	1-0 (won)	2003 SAFF Gold Cup (group stage)
11	18 January 2003	Bangabandhu National Stadium, Dhaka, Bangladesh	India	2-1 (won)	2003 SAFF Gold Cup (semi-final)
12	20 January 2003	Bangabandhu National Stadium, Dhaka, Bangladesh	Maldives	1-1 (5:3)(won)	2003 SAFF Gold Cup (final)
13	27 March 2003	Hong Kong	Laos	1-2 (lost)	2004 AFC Asian Cup qualification
14	30 March 2003	Hong Kong	Hong Kong	2-2 (draw)	2004 AFC Asian Cup qualification
15	26 November 2003	Sher-e-Bangla National Cricket Stadium, Dhaka, Bangladesh	Tajikistan	0-2 (lost)	2006 FIFA World Cup qualification – AFC first round
16	30 November 2003	Pamir Stadium, Dushanbe, Tajikistan	Tajikistan	0-2 (lost)	2006 FIFA World Cup qualification – AFC first round
17	8 December 2005	Peoples Football Stadium, Karachi, Pakistan	Bhutan	3-0 (won)	2005 SAFF Gold (group stage)
18	10 December 2005	Peoples Football Stadium, Karachi, Pakistan	Nepal	2-0 (won)	2005 SAFF Gold (group stage)
19	14 December 2005	Peoples Football Stadium, Karachi, Pakistan	Pakistan	1-0 (won)	2005 SAFF Gold (semi-final)
20	17 December 2005	Peoples Football Stadium, Karachi, Pakistan	India	0-2 (lost)	2005 SAFF Gold (final)
21	22 December 2005	Bangabandhu National Stadium, Dhaka, Bangladesh	Pakistan	1-2 (lost)	2007 AFC Asian Cup qualification (preliminary)
22	26 December 2005	National Stadium, Karachi, Pakistan	Pakistan	3-0 (won)	2007 AFC Asian Cup qualification (preliminary)
23	22 February 2006	Pakhtakor Central Stadium, Tashkent, Uzbekistan	Uzbekistan	0-5 (lost)	2007 AFC Asian Cup qualification
24	1 March 2006	Bangabandhu National Stadium, Dhaka, Bangladesh	Hong Kong	0-2 (lost)	2007 AFC Asian Cup qualification
25	18 October 2008	Shah Alam Stadium, Selangor, Malaysia	Myanmar	0-1 (lost)	2008 Merdeka Tournament (group stage)
26	11 November 2008	Thuwunna Stadium, Yangon, Myanmar	Myanmar	0-0 (draw)	Friendly
27	13 November 2008	Thuwunna Stadium, Yangon, Myanmar	Indonesia	0-2 (lost)	Friendly
28	28 April 2009	Sugathadasa Stadium, Colombo, Sri Lanka	Myanmar	1-2 (lost)	2010 AFC Challenge Cup (group stage)
29	23 July 2011	Camille Chamoun Sports City Stadium, Beirut, Lebaonon	Lebanon	0-4 (lost)	2014 FIFA World Cup qualification – AFC second round
30	28 July 2011	Bangabandhu National Stadium, Dhaka, Bangladesh	Lebanon	2-0 (won)	2014 FIFA World Cup qualification – AFC second round
31	2 December 2011	Jawaharlal Nehru Stadium, Delhi, India	Pakistan	0-0 (draw)	2011 SAFF Championship (group stage)
32	4 December 2011	Jawaharlal Nehru Stadium, Delhi, India	Nepal	0-1 (lost)	2011 SAFF Championship (group stage)
33	6 December 2011	Jawaharlal Nehru Stadium, Delhi, India	Maldives	1-3 (lost)	2011 SAFF Championship (group stage)
34	17 December 2012	Rajamangala Stadium, Bangkok, Thailand	Thailand	0-5 (lost)	Friendly
35	20 December 2012	Bukit Jalil National Stadium, Kuala Lumpur, Malaysia	Malaysia	0-0 (draw)	Friendly
36	4 March 2013	Dasharath Rangasala, Kathmandu, Nepal	Nepal	2-0 (won)	2014 AFC Challenge Cup qualification

=== International goals ===
==== Youth ====
#	Date	Venue	Opponent	Score	Result	Competition
1.	26 April 1998	Dasharath Rangasala, Kathmandu	Guam		11–0	1998 AFC U-16 Championship qualifiers
2.	3 October 2002	Gudeok Stadium, Busan	Turkmenistan	1–1	1–3	2002 Asian Games

==== Senior ====
#	Date	Venue	Opponent	Score	Result	Competition
1.	19 February 2001	Prince Mohamed bin Fahd Stadium, Dammam	Mongolia	1–1	2–2	2002 FIFA World Cup qualifiers
2.	19 February 2001	Prince Mohamed bin Fahd Stadium, Dammam	Mongolia	2–1	2–2	2002 FIFA World Cup qualifiers
3.	14 December 2005	Peoples Football Stadium, Karachi	Pakistan	1–0	1–0	2005 SAFF Championship

== Honours ==
Victoria SC

- Dhaka First Division League: 1999

Muktijoddha Sangsad KC

- Dhaka Premier Division League: 2000
- National Football League: 2003
- Bangladesh Federation Cup: 2003

Abahani Limited Dhaka

- Dhaka Premier Division League: 2001
- Bangladesh Premier League: 2007, 2009–10, 2012

Brothers Union

- National Football League: 2004
- Dhaka Premier Division League: 2003–04, 2005
- Bangladesh Federation Cup: 2005
- Bordoloi Trophy: 2004

Sheikh Jamal Dhanmondi Club

- Bangladesh Premier League: 2010–11

Bangladesh

- SAFF Championship: 2003

Awards and accolades

- 2005 − Sports Writers Association's Best Footballer Award.
