= Arman Aziz =

Bangladeshi former footballer

Personal information
- Full name: Mohammed Arman Aziz
- Date of birth: 10 May 1984 (age 42)
- Place of birth: Chittagong, Bangladesh
- Height: 1.75 m (5 ft 9 in)
- Positions: Defensive midfielder; central midfielder

Team information
- Current team: Chittagong Abahani (team manager)

Youth career
- Bakolia XI, Chittagong

Senior career*
Years	Team	Apps	(Gls)
2000–2003	Fakirerpool YMC		
2003–2004	Arambagh KS		
2005–2006	Mohammedan SC		
2007	Muktijoddha Sangsad		
2008–2010	Mohammedan SC		
2010–2011	Muktijoddha Sangsad		
2011–2012	Mohammedan SC		
2012–2014	Abahani Limited Dhaka		
2015–2016	Mohammedan SC		
2016–2017	Chittagong Abahani		

International career^{‡}
2002	Bangladesh U19		
2004–2006	Bangladesh U23		
2005–2009	Bangladesh	32	(0)
Medal record
Representing Bangladesh
Men's football
SAFF Championship
Runner-up	2005 Pakistan
- * Club domestic league appearances and goals as of 10 January 2020 ‡ National team caps and goals as of 28 February 2020

Arman Aziz (Bengali: আরমান আজিজ; born 10 May 1984) is a retired Bangladeshi professional footballer who played as a midfielder for the Bangladesh national team. He last served as team manager for Chittagong Abahani, the last club he represented as a player.

== Club career ==
Arman entered competitive football in the Chittagong Premier League with Bakulia XI. In 2000, he joined Fakirerpool Young Men's Club in Dhaka. In 2003, he debuted in the Dhaka Premier Division League with Arambagh KS.

Arman rose to prominence during the 2005–06 National League with Mohammedan SC. As captain, he led the team to victory in four trophies, including a significant win over rivals Abahani Limited Dhaka in the 2008 Federation Cup final. Despite receiving eleven stitches before the final due to an injury in the semi-final, he personally requested coach Maruful Haque to include him in the starting eleven, stating, "My mother told me to play, and I obeyed her".

In 2016, he joined his hometown club Chittagong Abahani. He announced his retirement on 22 February 2017, after playing against Mohammedan SC, in the 2017 Sheikh Kamal International Club Cup at the MA Aziz Stadium.

== International career ==
Arman represented the U19 team at the 2002 AFC Youth Championship qualifiers and captained the team, leading them to qualify for the main tournament. In 2005, he appeared for the national B team during the Myanmar Grand Royal Challenge Cup. He was later appointed captain of the Olympic team for the 2006 Asian Games. He previously represented the olympic team during the 2004 South Asian Games.

On 10 December 2005, Arman made his senior international debut for Bangladesh against Nepal at the 2005 SAFF Gold Cup. He earned 32 caps for Bangladesh between 2005 and 2009, before retiring from international duty in 2010, due to a long-term injury.

== Post–playing career ==
In 2017, Arman became the team manager of the Saif Sporting Club. In October 2018, he began serving as the team manager for Chittagong Abahani.

== Honours ==
Mohammedan SC

- National League: 2005–06
- Super Cup: 2009
- Federation Cup: 2009, 2008

Chittagong Abahani

- Independence Cup: 2016

Individual

- Kool-BSJA Footballer of the Year: 2008
