= Anamul Haque Sharif =

Bangladeshi footballer

Personal information
- Date of birth: 9 December 1985 (age 40)
- Place of birth: Cumilla, Bangladesh
- Height: 1.68 m (5 ft 6 in)
- Position: Defensive midfielder

Senior career*
Years	Team	Apps	(Gls)
2000–2002	Victoria SC		
2003–2004	Sheikh Russel KC		
2005–2011	Mohammedan SC		
2011–2016	Sheikh Jamal DC		
2017–2019	Mohammedan SC		

International career^{‡}
2003	Bangladesh U19		
2006–2016	Bangladesh	10	(0)
- * Club domestic league appearances and goals ‡ National team caps and goals as of 10 October 2016

Anamul Haque (born 1985) is a former Bangladeshi footballer who played as a midfielder. He last played for Sheikh Jamal Dhanmondi Club and was its captain.
