= Bahtiyar Can Vanlı =

German-Turkish football coach (born 1962)

Bahtiyar Can Vanlı (born June 1962 in Adana) is a German-Turkish football coach.

Can Vanlı participated in the 2002 World Cup in Korea / Japan and at the Confederations Cup in France in 2003 as assistant of Şenol Güneş, the Turkish national team coach.

He is currently head coach of the Lebanese Safa Club. With VB Sports Club Vanli won the Maldives Championship 2010 and 2011, the Charity Shield 2010 and 2011 and the presidents Cup in 2010.

He was also coach of Turkish second division Yeni Kırşehirspor. Vanli is an expert in using computer software for match analysis.
