= Zahid Hasan Ameli =

Bangladeshi footballer

Zahid Hasan
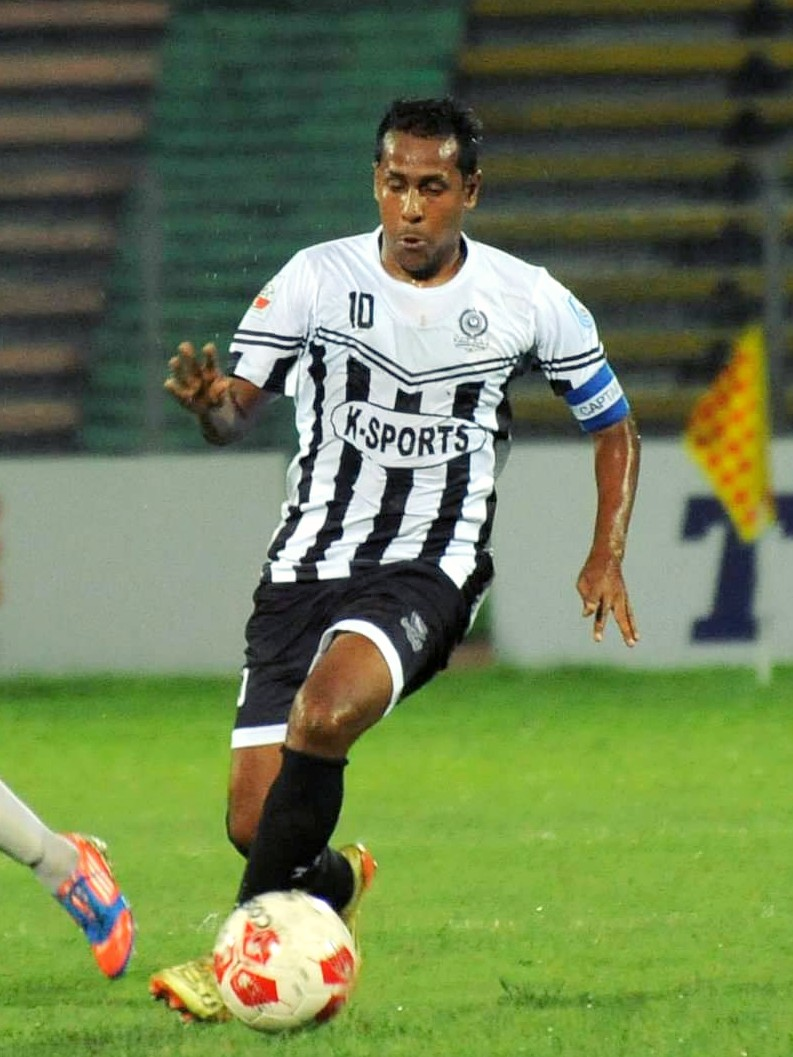
- Zahid with Mohammedan SC in 2019

Personal information
- Full name: Mohamed Zahid Hasan Ameli
- Date of birth: 25 December 1987 (age 38)
- Place of birth: Pirojpur Sadar Upazila, Bangladesh
- Height: 1.68 m (5 ft 6 in)
- Position: Forward

Senior career*
Years	Team	Apps	(Gls)
2002–2006	Brothers Union		
2007–2009	Dhaka Abahani	37	(25)
2009–2010	Mohammedan SC	24	(19)
2010–2011	Sheikh Jamal DC	16	(6)
2011–2012	Muktijoddha Sangsad	19	(5)
2012–2013	Sheikh Russel KC	16	(6)
2013–2014	Mohammedan SC	27	(9)
2014–2015	Sheikh Russel KC		(6)
2015 –2016	Chittagong Abahani		(0)
2017–2019	Mohammedan SC	34	(2)
2021	Brothers Union	2	(0)

International career^{‡}
2005–2014	Bangladesh U23	12	(1)
2005–2016	Bangladesh	64	(15)
Medal record
Representing Bangladesh
Men's football
SAFF Championship
Runner-up	2005
South Asian Games
Winner	2010
- * Club domestic league appearances and goals as of 10 May 2021 ‡ National team caps and goals as of 15:35, 10 October 2016 (UTC)

Zahid Hasan Ameli (Bengali: জাহিদ হাসান এমিলি; born 25 December 1987) is a retired Bangladeshi footballer who played as a striker for the Bangladesh national team from 2005 to 2014. He is the current second highest goalscorer Bangladesh in international football and also has the third highest caps.

== Club career ==
From 2007 to 2009, Ameli played for Dhaka side Abahani Limited where he scored 25 league goals, helping the club win back-to-back B. League titles. He then moved to another Dhaka side, Mohammedan Sport Club for the 2009–10 season where he scored 18 goals as the club finished league runners-up. Before the start of the 2010–11 season, he transferred to Sheikh Jamal Dhanmondi Club. They eventually won the league title. Later he joined Muktijoddha Sangsad KS in the 2011–12 season; his team became Premier League runner-up. He joined Sheikh Russel KC in 2012 and led his team to the Federation Cup (Bangladesh) title by scoring 8 goals in the tournament.

== Career statistics ==
=== International ===
Appearances and goals by national team and year
National team	Year	Apps	Goals
Bangladesh	2005	7	2
Bangladesh	2006	8	2
Bangladesh	2007	6	0
Bangladesh	2008	7	2
Bangladesh	2009	5	1
Bangladesh	2010	3	0
Bangladesh	2011	10	2
Bangladesh	2012	3	1
Bangladesh	2013	3	1
Bangladesh	2014	3	2
Bangladesh	2015	8	2
Bangladesh	2016	1	0
Total		64	15

Scores and results list Bangladesh's goal tally first, score column indicates score after each Ameli goal.

List of international goals scored by Zahid Hasan Ameli
No.	Date	Venue	Opponent	Score	Result	Competition	Ref.
1	8 December 2005	People's Football Stadium, Karachi, Pakistan	Bhutan	3–0	3–0	2005 SAFF Gold Cup	
2	12 December 2005	People's Football Stadium, Karachi, Pakistan	India	1–1	1–1	2005 SAFF Gold Cup	
3	1 April 2006	National Stadium, Dhaka, Bangladesh	Cambodia	2–0	2–1	Friendly	
4	3 April 2006	National Stadium, Dhaka, Bangladesh	Guam	1–0	3–0	Friendly	
5	9 May 2008	Spartak Stadium, Bishkek, Kyrgyzstan	Kyrgyzstan	1–0	1–2	2008 AFC Challenge Cup qualification	
6	6 June 2008	Sugathadasa Stadium, Colombo, Sri Lanka	Afghanistan	1–2	2–2	2008 SAFF Championship	
7	4 December 2009	National Stadium, Dhaka, Bangladesh	Bhutan	4–1	4–1	2009 SAFF Championship	
8	29 June 2011	National Stadium, Dhaka, Bangladesh	Pakistan	1–0	3–0	2014 FIFA World Cup qualification	
9	28 July 2011	National Stadium, Dhaka, Bangladesh	Lebanon	2–0	2–0	2014 FIFA World Cup qualification	
10	20 November 2012	Bukit Jalil National Stadium, Kuala Lumpur, Malaysia	Malaysia	1–1	1–1	Friendly	
11	5 September 2013	Halchowk Stadium, Kathmandu, Nepal	Pakistan	1–0	1–2	2013 SAFF Championship	
12	24 October 2014	Shamsul Huda Stadium, Jessore, Bangladesh	Sri Lanka	1–0	1–1	Friendly	
13	27 October 2014	Shaheed Qamaruzzaman Stadium, Rajshahi, Bangladesh	Sri Lanka	1–0	1–0	Friendly	
14	2 June 2015	National Stadium, Dhaka, Bangladesh	Afghanistan	1–0	1–1	Friendly	
15	16 June 2015	National Stadium, Dhaka, Bangladesh	Tajikistan	1–0	1–1	2018 FIFA World Cup qualification	

== Honours ==
Brothers Union

- Dhaka Premier Division League: 2003–04, 2005
- National League: 2004
- Federation Cup: 2005
- Bordoloi Trophy: 2004

Abahani Limited

- Bangladesh Premier League: 2007, 2008–09

Mohammedan SC

- Federation Cup: 2009
- Super Cup: 2009
- Independence Cup: 2013–14

Sheikh Russel KC

- Bangladesh Premier League: 2012–13
- Federation Cup: 2012
- Independence Cup: 2012–13

Sheikh Jamal Dhanmondi Club

- Bangladesh Premier League: 2010–11

Chittagong Abahani

- Sheikh Kamal International Club Cup: 2015
- Independence Cup: 2016

Bangladesh U-23

- South Asian Games Gold medal (1): 2010
