= Junior Obagbemiro =

Nigerian footballer (born 1985)

Personal information
- Date of birth: 26 June 1985 (age 41)
- Place of birth: Nigeria
- Height: 1.79 m (5 ft 10 in)
- Position: Forward

Senior career*
| Years | Team | Apps | (Gls) |
| 2004–2005 | Esteghlal | | |
| 2005–2006 | Brigade Boys Club | | |
| 2006–2007 | Sabah FA | | |
| 2007 | Three Star | | |
| 2007–2008 | Brothers Union | | |
| 2008 | Sporting Goa | | |
| 2008 | Kajaanin Haka | | |
| 2008–2009 | Sporting Goa | | (10) |
| 2009 | Kajaanin Haka | | |
| 2009–2010 | Sporting Goa | | (10) |
| 2010–2011 | Prayag United | | (8) |
| 2011–2012 | Salgaocar | | |
| 2012–2013 | Air India | 25 | (4) |
| 2013–2014 | Kajaanin Haka | | |
| 2014–2015 | Sliema Wanderers | 6 | (1) |
| 2015–? | JS Hercules | | |
- * Club domestic league appearances and goals

Junior Obagbemiro (born 26 June 1985) is a Nigerian former professional footballer who played as a forward.

== Career ==
Obagbemiro's career has been mostly in Asia including India, Malaysia, Bangladesh and Nepal and also in Finland. He has been top scorer in the past years in both the Bangladeshi and Nepali top leagues. He was also nominated the best foreign player in the I-League in the 2009 season where he helped Sporting Club de Goa to second place.

Obagbemiro has also played two seasons in the 4th tier of the Finnish league for Kajaanin Haka in 2008 and 2009, winning the amateur club promotion to the 3rd tier of the Finnish league before returning to Goa to play the season for Sporting Clube. In 2010, he moved to Prayag United S.C. for one season scoring 18 goals.^{,} At the end of the season, he moved, this time to Salgaocar S.C. to play alongside Chidi Edeh.^{,} He joined Air India for the I-League 2012/13 season and was by far their best player and was able to score 13 goals. He later played for Maltese side Sliema Wanderers.
