= Ministry of Youth and Sports (Bangladesh) =

Government ministry of Bangladesh

- যুব ও ক্রীড়া মন্ত্রণালয়
- Government Seal of Bangladesh

Ministry overview
- Formed: June 1991; 35 years ago
- Jurisdiction: Government of Bangladesh
- Headquarters: Bangladesh Secretariat, Dhaka
- Annual budget: ৳1803 crore (US$150 million) (2026-2027)
- Minister of State responsible: Aminul Haque, Minister of State
- Ministry executives: Mr. Md Mahbub-Ul-Alam, Secretary
- Child agencies: Directorate of Sports; National Sports Council; Bangladesh Krira Shikkha Protishtan; Youth Development Department; National Institute of Youth Development
- Website: moysports.gov.bd

The Ministry of Youth and Sports (Bengali: যুব ও ক্রীড়া মন্ত্রণালয়, romanized: Jubo ō Krīṛā Montronaloy; abbreviated as MoYS) is a ministry of the Government of Bangladesh responsible for the development of youth affairs and the promotion of sports nationwide. The ministry formulates and implements policies aimed at youth empowerment, leadership development, skills training, and employment generation, as well as programs that encourage civic engagement and social inclusion.

The ministry comes forward to the associations with guidelines, programs, fiscal supports and necessary nonsupervisory advice. Ministry of Youth and Sports also works as guardian to the Department of Youth Development which is the only enforcing agency of government programs and programmes for the youth and has services in 64 sections and 476 sub sections, and 60 institutional training centers throughout the country.

== Directorates ==
- Directorate of Sports
- National Sports Council
- Bangladesh Krira Shikkha Protishtan (BKSP) (Bangladesh Sports Education)
- Department of Youth Development
- National Institute of Youth Development
