= 2003 SAFF Gold Cup =

Tournament details
- Host country: Bangladesh
- Dates: 10–20 January
- Venue: 1 (in 1 host city)

Final positions
- Champions: Bangladesh (1st title)
- Runners-up: Maldives
- Third place: India
- Fourth place: Pakistan

Tournament statistics
- Matches played: 16
- Goals scored: 39 (2.44 per match)
- Top scorer: (Pakistan) Sarfraz Rasool (4 goals)
- Best player: (Bangladesh) Rajani Kanta Barman

The 2003 South Asian Football Federation Gold Cup was the fifth international association football championship for national teams from South Asia organised by the South Asian Football Federation (SAFF). Hosted by Bangladesh, the competition was delayed by one year following the country's suspension by the Fédération Internationale de Football Association (FIFA). It ran from 10 to 20 January 2003 and was contested by the national teams of Afghanistan, Bangladesh, Bhutan, India, the Maldives, Nepal, Pakistan and Sri Lanka.

The tournament began with the first match of the group stage on 10 January 2003 and ended with the final on 20 January 2003. Bangladesh and the Maldives contested the final. After a 1–1 draw in 90 minutes and extra time, Bangladesh defeated the Maldives 5–3 on penalties as they were crowned champions for the first time.

== Background ==
The first edition of the biennial South Asian Football Federation Championship, then known as the South Asian Association of Regional Co-operation Gold Cup, was held Lahore, Pakistan in 1993.

India were the defending champions after defeating Bangladesh 2–0 in the final as hosts. India were also the most successful team in the history of the tournament after winning three of the first four editions.

Originally, the 2003 SAFF Gold Cup was scheduled to be held between 26 January and 5 February 2002. However, the Bangladesh Football Federation was suspended by the Fédération Internationale de Football Association (FIFA) 15 days before the start of the tournament. All matches were moved by exactly 349 days after the suspension was lifted. Afghanistan were not included in the original draw but, following a recommendation from the Asian Football Confederation (AFC), they were added to the draw.

== Format ==
In total, eight teams took part in the competition. They were drawn into two single round robin groups of four teams. The group winners and runners-up would contest the semi-finals which would decide which teams contested the final and the third-place play-off.

=== Participants ===
- Afghanistan
- Bangladesh
- Bhutan
- India
- Maldives
- Nepal
- Pakistan
- Sri Lanka

== Venue ==
Matches were played at the Bangabandhu National Stadium in Dhaka.

| Dhaka | 2003 SAFF Gold Cup is located in Bangladesh |
| Bangabandhu National Stadium | 2003 SAFF Gold Cup is located in Bangladesh |
| Capacity: 36,000 | 2003 SAFF Gold Cup is located in Bangladesh |

== Group stage ==
=== Group A ===
Pakistan and India advanced to the semi-finals.

==== Table ====
| Pos | Team | Pld | W | D | L | GF | GA | GD | Pts | Qualification |
|---|---|---|---|---|---|---|---|---|---|---|
| 1 | Pakistan | 3 | 3 | 0 | 0 | 4 | 1 | +3 | 9 | Qualification for the semi-finals |
| 2 | India | 3 | 1 | 1 | 1 | 5 | 2 | +3 | 4 | Qualification for the semi-finals |
| 3 | Sri Lanka | 3 | 1 | 1 | 1 | 3 | 3 | 0 | 4 | |
| 4 | Afghanistan | 3 | 0 | 0 | 3 | 0 | 6 | −6 | 0 | |

==== Matches ====
10 January 2003

| India | 0–1 | Pakistan |
|---|---|---|
| | | Rasool 50' |

Bangabandhu Stadium, Dhaka
Referee: Tayeb Hossain (Bangladesh)
10 January 2003

| Sri Lanka | 1–0 | Afghanistan |
|---|---|---|
| Steinwall 41' |

Bangabandhu Stadium, Dhaka
Referee: Budhi Bahadur Gurung (Nepal)

12 January 2003

| Pakistan | 2–1 | Sri Lanka |
|---|---|---|
| Niaz 50'; Rasool 86' | | Weersinghe 89' |

Bangabandhu Stadium, Dhaka
Referee: Ram Krishna Ghosh (Bangladesh)
12 January 2003

| India | 4–0 | Afghanistan |
|---|---|---|
| Biswas 30', 63'; D'Cunha 77', 86' |

Bangabandhu Stadium, Dhaka
Referee: Budhi Bahadur Gurung (Nepal)

14 January 2003

| Pakistan | 1–0 | Afghanistan |
|---|---|---|
| Rasool 9' |

Bangabandhu Stadium, Dhaka
Referee: Ram Krishna Ghosh (Bangladesh)
14 January 2003

| India | 1–1 | Sri Lanka |
|---|---|---|
| Biswas 88' | | Abeysekera 90' |

Bangabandhu Stadium, Dhaka
Referee: Hasan (Bangladesh)

=== Group B ===
Bangladesh and Maldives advanced to the semi-finals.

==== Table ====
| Pos | Team | Pld | W | D | L | GF | GA | GD | Pts | Qualification |
|---|---|---|---|---|---|---|---|---|---|---|
| 1 | Bangladesh | 3 | 3 | 0 | 0 | 5 | 0 | +5 | 9 | Qualification for the semi-finals |
| 2 | Maldives | 3 | 2 | 0 | 1 | 9 | 3 | +6 | 6 | Qualification for the semi-finals |
| 3 | Nepal | 3 | 1 | 0 | 2 | 4 | 4 | 0 | 3 | |
| 4 | Bhutan | 3 | 0 | 0 | 3 | 0 | 11 | −11 | 0 | |

==== Matches ====
11 January 2003

| Maldives | 6–0 | Bhutan |
|---|---|---|
| Nizam 2'; Luffy 11'; Shiham 24', 25', 67'; Umar 77' |

Bangabandhu Stadium, Dhaka
Referee: AD Silva (Sri Lanka)
11 January 2003

| Bangladesh | 1–0 | Nepal |
|---|---|---|
| Alfaz 30' |

Bangabandhu Stadium, Dhaka
Attendance: 55,000
Referee: Kunsuta Chaiwat (Thailand)

13 January 2003

| Nepal | 2–0 | Bhutan |
|---|---|---|
| Rayamajhi 14'; Thapa 87' |

Bangabandhu Stadium, Dhaka
Attendance: 25,000
Referee: Balu Sundar Raj (India)
13 January 2003

| Bangladesh | 1–0 | Maldives |
|---|---|---|
| Joy 90' |

Bangabandhu Stadium, Dhaka
Attendance: 20,000
Referee: AD Silva (Sri Lanka)

15 January 2003

| Nepal | 2–3 | Maldives |
|---|---|---|
| Rayamajhi 56'; Chaudhary 90' (pen.) | | Nizam 63'; Lutfy 75'; Umar 85' |

Bangabandhu Stadium, Dhaka
Attendance: 15,000
Referee: Kunsuta Chaiwat (Thailand)
15 January 2003

| Bangladesh | 3–0 | Bhutan |
|---|---|---|
| Farhad 3', 54'; Kanchan 78' |

Bangabandhu Stadium, Dhaka
Attendance: 15,000
Referee: Balu Sundar Raj (India)

== Semi-finals ==
Bangladesh defeated India after extra time and the Maldives defeated Pakistan to advance to the final.

18 January 2003

| Bangladesh | 2–1 (a.s.d.e.t.) | India |
|---|---|---|
| Kanchan 77'; Munna 98' | | D'Cunha 81' |

Bangabandhu Stadium, Dhaka
Referee: Kunsuta Chaiwat (Thailand)

18 January 2003

| Maldives | 1–0 | Pakistan |
|---|---|---|
| Fazeel 12' |

Bangabandhu Stadium, Dhaka
Referee: Budhi Bahadur Gurung (Nepal)

== Third-place play-off ==
After a 1–1 draw in 90 minutes, Abhishek Yadav scored the golden goal in extra time as India finished third.

20 January 2003

| India | 2–1 (a.s.d.e.t.) | Pakistan |
|---|---|---|
| Vijayan 56'; Yadav 99' | | Rasool 66' |

Bangabandhu Stadium, Dhaka
Referee: Tayeb Hasan (Bangladesh)

== Final ==
After a 1–1 draw in 90 minutes and extra time, Bangladesh defeated the Maldives 5–3 on penalties.

20 January 2003

| Bangladesh | 1–1 (a.s.d.e.t.) | Maldives |
|---|---|---|
| Kanchan 13' | | Umar 57' |
Penalties
| Nazrul (penalty scored); Farhad (penalty scored); Al-Mamun (penalty scored); Hasan (penalty scored); Sujan (penalty scored) | 5–3 | (penalty scored) Naaz; (penalty missed) Lutfy; (penalty scored) Naseem; (penalty scored) Fazeel |

Bangabandhu Stadium, Dhaka
Attendance: 46,000
Referee: AD Silva (Sri Lanka)
