= Ali Shiham =

Maldivian footballer

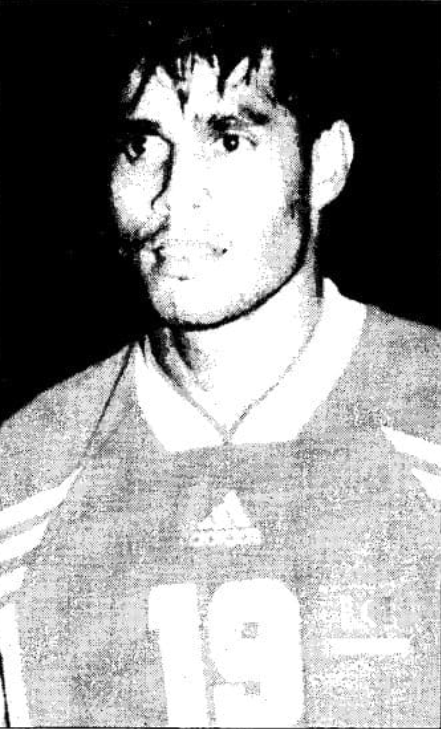
- Shiham at the 2003 SAFF Gold Cup

Personal information
- Full name: Ali Shiham
- Date of birth: 26 June 1975 (age 51)
- Place of birth: K. Huraa, Maldives
- Position: Forward

Senior career*
| Years | Team | Apps | (Gls) |
| –2000 | Hurriyya | | |
| 2001–2002 | Club Valencia | | |
| 2003 | New Radiant | | |
| 2004–2006 | Hurriyya | | |

International career
| 199?–2003 | Maldives | | |
- * Club domestic league appearances and goals

Ali Shiham (born 26 June ) is a former Maldivian international footballer.

== International career ==
Ali Shiham has appeared in FIFA World Cup qualifying matches for Maldives.

He is well known as the first player to score a hat-trick for Maldives national team in their 22 years of international football on 11 January 2003 against Bhutan at Bangabandhu National Stadium during the 2003 South Asian Football Federation Gold Cup group stage.

== Outside football ==
Shiham was offered to act in a Maldivian video song in 2003 for a fee of 20,000 MVR and he accepted the deal as it came from a very close friend of him; producer Ahmed Moosa (Ammaty).

== Career statistics ==
=== International goals ===
| # | Date | Venue | Opponent | Score | Result | Competition |
|---|---|---|---|---|---|---|
| 1. | 27 September 1999 | Dasharath Stadium, Kathmandu | Bangladesh | 1–0 | 2–1 | 1999 South Asian Games |
| 2. | 4 May 2000 | Rasmee Dhandu Stadium, Malé | Nepal | 2–0 | 3–0 | 2000 MFF Golden Jubilee Tournament |
| 3. | 1 April 2001 | Rasmee Dhandu Stadium, Malé | Cambodia | 3–0 | 6–0 | 2002 FIFA World Cup qualification |
| 4. | 11 January 2003 | Peoples Football Stadium, Karachi | Bhutan | 3–0 | 6–0 | 2003 SAFF Gold Cup |
| 5. | 11 January 2003 | Peoples Football Stadium, Karachi | Bhutan | 4–0 | 6–0 | 2003 SAFF Gold Cup |
| 6. | 11 January 2003 | Peoples Football Stadium, Karachi | Bhutan | 5–0 | 6–0 | 2003 SAFF Gold Cup |
