= 2008–09 B.League =

2nd professional season of the top-flight football league in Bangladesh

B.League
- Season: 2008–09
- Dates: 13 September 2008 — 17 February 2009
- Champions: Abahani Limited Dhaka
- Premiers: 2
- Relegated: Khulna Abahani SC
- AFC President's Cup: Abahani Limited Dhaka
- Matches: 110
- Goals: 280 (2.55 per match)
- Top goalscorer: (Nigeria) Alamu Bukola Olalekan (18 goals)
- Biggest home win: Dhaka Mohammedan SC 7–0 Muktijoddha Sangsad KC (7 October 2008)
- Biggest away win: Khulna Abahani SC 0–7 Farashganj SC (15 January 2009)
- Highest scoring: Rahmatganj MFS 3–6 Abahani Limited Dhaka (16 February 2009)
- Longest winning run: 8 games Abahani Limited Dhaka
- Longest unbeaten run: 10 games Abahani Limited Dhaka
- Longest winless run: 19 games Khulna Abahani SC
- Longest losing run: 14 games Khulna Abahani SC

The 2008–09 Citycell B. League season was the second season of B.League. The season started on 13 September 2008 and concluded on 17 February 2009.

Abahani Limited Dhaka were the defending champions, and they successfully defended their title.

== League System ==
11 teams participated in the league just like the previous year. Season started on 13 September, 2008 and ended in March 2009. Each team will play each other home & away twice. There is no promotion or relegation system. Teams participating in the league is not allowed to participate in the local league. As the clubs do not have their own stadium. Bangladesh Football Federation will distribute stadiums located in & nearby outside Dhaka. Each team will play 1 match a week. Matches will be on Friday & Saturday. Each team will have a 23-member squad which is already announced. Winner of a match will receive 2 points, lost 0 points & if drawn, 1 point. There is no limitation for foreign player registration. But each team can play 3 foreigners at a time. The league winner will receive a large amount of prize money. The amount is not announced yet.

== Qualification ==
The league champions qualify for AFC President's Cup 2009

== Teams ==
12 teams were added to the league, with Fakirerpool Young Men's Club earning promotion by winning the 2007–08 Dhaka Senior Division League, however the club was not invited to enter and the season started with 11 teams like the inaugural season.

| Team | Location | Stadium | Capacity |
|---|---|---|---|
| Abahani Limited Dhaka | Dhaka | Bangabandhu National Stadium | 36,000 |
| Arambagh Krira Sangha | Dhaka (Mymensingh) | Mymensingh Stadium | 12,000 |
| Brothers Union | Dhaka | Bir Sherestha Shaheed Shipahi Mostafa Kamal Stadium | 25,000 |
| Chittagong Abahani | Chittagong | M. A. Aziz Stadium | 20,000 |
| Chittagong Mohammedan Sporting Club | Chittagong | M. A. Aziz Stadium | 20,000 |
| Farashganj SC | Dhaka (Farashganj) | Bir Sherestha Shaheed Shipahi Mostafa Kamal Stadium | 25,000 |
| Khulna Abahani SC | Khulna | – | – |
| Mohammedan Sporting Club | Dhaka | Bangabandhu National Stadium | 36,000 |
| Muktijoddha Sangsad KC | Dhaka (Gopalganj) | Sheikh Fazlul Haque Mani Stadium | 5,000 |
| Rahmatganj MFS | Dhaka | Bir Sherestha Shaheed Shipahi Mostafa Kamal Stadium | 25,000 |
| Sheikh Russel KC | Sylhet | Sylhet District Stadium | 25,000 |

== Venues ==
- Bangabandhu Stadium
- MA Aziz Stadium
- Khulna Divisional Stadium

== League standings ==
| Pos | Team | Pld | W | D | L | GF | GA | GD | Pts | Qualification |
|---|---|---|---|---|---|---|---|---|---|---|
| 1 | Dhaka Abahani | 20 | 16 | 2 | 2 | 45 | 11 | +34 | 50 | |
| 2 | Dhaka Mohammedan | 20 | 13 | 5 | 2 | 42 | 12 | +30 | 44 | |
| 3 | Sheikh Russel | 20 | 12 | 5 | 3 | 40 | 20 | +20 | 41 | |
| 4 | Brothers Union | 20 | 10 | 7 | 3 | 34 | 23 | +11 | 37 | |
| 5 | Chittagong Mohammedan | 20 | 8 | 6 | 6 | 22 | 16 | +6 | 30 | |
| 6 | Farashganj | 20 | 7 | 5 | 8 | 23 | 22 | +1 | 26 | |
| 7 | Rahmatganj MFS | 20 | 6 | 3 | 11 | 24 | 32 | −8 | 21 | |
| 8 | Chittagong Abahani | 20 | 5 | 5 | 10 | 18 | 23 | −5 | 20 | |
| 9 | Arambagh | 20 | 4 | 6 | 10 | 14 | 27 | −13 | 18 | |
| 10 | Muktijoddha Sangsad | 20 | 3 | 4 | 13 | 8 | 35 | −27 | 13 | |
| 11 | Khulna Abahani | 20 | 1 | 2 | 17 | 10 | 59 | −49 | 5 | Relegation |

Source: B. League

== Top scorers ==
| Rank | Player | Club | Goals |
|---|---|---|---|
| 1 | (Nigeria) Alamu Bukola Olalekan | Mohammedan SC | 18 |
| 2 | (Nigeria) Emeka Christian | Abahani Limited Dhaka | 17 |
| 3 | (Bangladesh) Alfaz Ahmed | Sheikh Russel KC | 16 |
| 4 | (Uganda) Idris Kasirye | Rahmatganj MFS | 13 |
| 5 | (Bangladesh) Enamul Haque | Farashganj SC | 13 |
| 6 | (Bangladesh) Zahid Hasan Ameli | Abahani Limited Dhaka | 13 |
| 7 | (Bangladesh) Shakhawat Hossain Rony | Chittagong Abahani | 8 |
| 8 | (Guinea) Raphael Sagno | Chittagong Mohammedan SC | 6 |
