= 2003 National Football League (Bangladesh) =

Statistics of 2003 National Football League (Bangladesh).

== Overview ==
Muktijoddha Sangsad KC won the championship.

== First stage ==
=== Group 1 ===
Pos	Team	Pld	W	D	L	GF	GA	GD	Pts	Qualification
1	Wanderers Club	1	1	0	0	1	0	+1	3	Playoff
2	Abahani Ltd	1	0	0	1	0	1	−1	0	Playoff

Source: rsssf.com

=== Group 2 ===
Pos	Team	Pld	W	D	L	GF	GA	GD	Pts	Qualification
1	Mohammedan SC	2	1	1	0	3	0	+3	4	Playoff
2	Muktijoddha Sangsad KC	2	1	1	0	1	0	+1	4	Playoff
3	Arambagh Krira Sangha	2	0	0	2	0	4	−4	0	

Source: rsssf.com

== Playoff ==
=== Semifinals ===
- Wanderers Club 0-1 Muktijoddha Sangsad KC
- Mohammedan SC 1-0 Abahani Ltd

=== Final ===
- Mohammedan SC 1-1 (pen 2–3) Muktijoddha Sangsad KC

Muktijoddha Sangsad KC won the championship.
