= 2005 SAFF Gold Cup =

2005 SAFF Championship

Tournament details
- Host country: Pakistan
- Dates: 7–17 December
- Venue: 1 (in 1 host city)

Final positions
- Champions: India (4th title)
- Runners-up: Bangladesh

Tournament statistics
- Matches played: 15
- Goals scored: 38 (2.53 per match)
- Top scorer(s): (Maldives) Ibrahim Fazeel (Maldives) Ali Ashfaq (Maldives) Ahmed Thariq (3 goals each)
- Best player: (India) Bhaichung Bhutia
- Fair play award: Bhutan

The 2005 SAFF Championship (officially designated as the 2005 SAFF Gold Cup) was the sixth international association football championship for national teams from South Asia organised by the South Asian Football Federation. Hosted by Pakistan, the competition ran from 7 to 17 December 2005 and was contested by the national teams of Afghanistan, Bangladesh, Bhutan, India, the Maldives, Nepal, Pakistan and Sri Lanka.

The tournament began with the first matches of the group stage on 7 December 2005 and ended with the final on 17 December 2005. In a repeat of the 1999 final, India and Bangladesh contested the final. Goals from Mehrajuddin Wadoo and Baichung Bhutia helped India to a 2–0 win as they lifted the trophy for the fourth time.

== Background ==
The first edition of the biennial South Asian Football Federation Championship, then known as the South Asian Association of Regional Co-operation Gold Cup, was held Lahore, Pakistan in 1993.

Bangladesh were the defending champions after defeating the Maldives 5–3 on penalties in the final as hosts. India were the most successful team in the history of the tournament after winning three of the first five editions.

== Format ==
In total, eight teams took part in the competition. They were drawn into two single round robin groups of four teams. The group winners and runners-up would contest the semi-finals which would decide which teams contested the final and the third-place play-off.

=== Participants ===
- Afghanistan
- Bangladesh
- Bhutan
- India
- Maldives
- Nepal
- Pakistan
- Sri Lanka

== Venue ==
Matches were played at the People's Football Stadium in Karachi.

Karachi	2005 SAFF Gold Cup (Pakistan)
People's Football Stadium	2005 SAFF Gold Cup (Pakistan)
Capacity: 40,000	2005 SAFF Gold Cup (Pakistan)

== Group stage ==
=== Group A ===
The Maldives and Pakistan advanced to the semi-finals.

==== Table ====
Pos	Team	Pld	W	D	L	GF	GA	GD	Pts	Qualification
1	Maldives	3	2	1	0	11	1	+10	7	Qualification for the semi-finals
2	Pakistan	3	2	1	0	2	0	+2	7	Qualification for the semi-finals
3	Afghanistan	3	1	0	2	3	11	−8	3	
4	Sri Lanka	3	0	0	3	1	5	−4	0	

==== Matches ====
7 December 2005

Pakistan	1–0	Sri Lanka
Hussain 38'

Peoples Football Stadium, Karachi
7 December 2005

Maldives	9–1	Afghanistan
Umar 11'; Fazeel 27', 45+2', 60'; Ashfaq 32', 88'; Thariq 45+3', 46', 86'		Maqsood 39'

Peoples Football Stadium, Karachi

9 December 2005

Maldives	2–0	Sri Lanka
Ashfaq 15'; Umar 83'

Peoples Football Stadium, Karachi
9 December 2005

Pakistan	1–0	Afghanistan
Essa 55'

Peoples Football Stadium, Karachi

11 December 2005

Sri Lanka	1–2	Afghanistan
Karunarathne 85'		Qadami 35'; Gullestani 41'

Peoples Football Stadium, Karachi
11 December 2005

Pakistan	0–0	Maldives

Peoples Football Stadium, Karachi

=== Group B ===
Bangladesh and India advanced to the semi-finals.

==== Table ====
Pos	Team	Pld	W	D	L	GF	GA	GD	Pts	Qualification
1	Bangladesh	3	2	1	0	6	1	+5	7	Qualification for the semi-finals
2	India	3	2	1	0	6	2	+4	7	Qualification for the semi-finals
3	Nepal	3	1	0	2	4	5	−1	3	
4	Bhutan	3	0	0	3	1	9	−8	0	

==== Matches ====
8 December 2005

Bangladesh	3–0	Bhutan
Farhad 42', 58'; Ameli 85'

Peoples Football Stadium, Karachi
8 December 2005

India	2–1	Nepal
Hossain 6', 28'		Thapa 35'

Peoples Football Stadium, Karachi

10 December 2005

Bangladesh	2–0	Nepal
Kanchan 27', 87'

Peoples Football Stadium, Karachi
10 December 2005

India	3–0	Bhutan
Bhutia 45'; Gawli 51'; Hakim 64'

Peoples Football Stadium, Karachi

12 December 2005

Nepal	3–1	Bhutan
Tamang 10'; Thapa 16'; Gurung 29'		Pradhan 47'

Peoples Football Stadium, Karachi
12 December 2005

Bangladesh	1–1	India
Ameli 77'		Lawrence 17'

Peoples Football Stadium, Karachi

== Semi-finals ==
Nanjangud Shivananju Manju scored the only goal as India defeated the Maldives and Mohammed Sujan scored the only goal as Bangladesh defeated Pakistan to advance to the final.

14 December 2005

Maldives	0–1	India
		Manju 38'

Peoples Football Stadium, Karachi
14 December 2005

Bangladesh	1–0	Pakistan
Sujan 44' (pen.)

Peoples Football Stadium, Karachi

== Final ==
Goals from Mehrajuddin Wadoo and Baichung Bhutia helped India to a 2–0 win against Bangladesh.

17 December 2005

India	2–0	Bangladesh
Wadoo 33'; Bhutia 81'

Peoples Football Stadium, Karachi
