= Mohammedan SC (Chittagong) =

Bangladeshi association football club based in Chittagong

Chittagong Mohammedan SC
- Full name: Chittagong Mohammedan Sporting Club Limited
- Nicknames: Black and Whites of Chattala (Bengali: চট্টলার সাদা কালো)
- Short name: CMSC
- Founded: 1950; 76 years ago
- President: Mohammad Sarwar Alam

Chittagong Mohammedan Sporting Club (Bengali: চট্টগ্রাম মোহামেডান স্পোর্টিং ক্লাব) is a sports club based in Chittagong, Bangladesh. The club was established in 1950 and is mainly known for its football team. Chittagong Mohammedan is considered the most successful club in the Chittagong Football Premier League, with a record 19 titles.

== History ==
The team was one of the participants in the inaugural season of the Bangladesh Football League in 2007 and competed in the first three seasons of the league. They suffered relegation in 2010 Bangladesh League and didn't participate in any league for five years.

In 2016, Chittagong Mohammedan returned to domestic professional football by participating in the 2016 Bangladesh Championship League, the second-tier football league of the country. But they failed again to prevent relegation. After that, they didn't compete in any professional football league.
