= Bangladesh Super Cup =

Super Cup
- Founded: 2009; 17 years ago
- Region: Bangladesh
- Teams: 8
- Current champions: Mohammedan SC (2nd title)
- Most championships: Mohammedan SC (2 titles)
- Broadcaster: Bangladesh Television
- Website: bffonline.com
- 2025–26 Bangladesh Super Cup

The Bangladeshi Super Cup is the highest-budgeted football competition organized by the Bangladesh Football Federation and is one of the two club football season cups in Bangladesh, the other being Federation Cup.

== History ==
The competition kicked off for the first time on Wednesday, 11 March 2009 inaugurated by Citycell's Chief Executive Officer Michel Seamour and the Federation's president Kazi Salahuddin in which Mohammedan Sporting Club became the first champion beating arch-rival Abahani Limited. The prize money for the tournament was $150,000 which is said to be a record in Asia. Mohammedan defeated the country's Premier League winners Abahani 1–0 in an exciting final attended by a crowd of 44,000 in the country's main international football venue Bangabandhu National Stadium.

The second Super Cup was on 6 August 2011 at Bangabandhu National Stadium by 2010–2011 season champion Abahani Ltd beating Mohammedan SC in a heated remeet.

The third Super Cup was held in June 2013 in which Mohammedan Sporting Club became champion for the second time by beating 2012–13 Bangladesh Football Premier League champion Sheikh Russel KC.

== Results ==
| Year | Winners | Runners-up | Score | Ref |
|---|---|---|---|---|
| 2009 | Mohammedan Sporting Club | Abahani Limited Dhaka | 1–0 | |
| 2011 | Abahani Limited Dhaka | Mohammedan Sporting Club | 2(5)–(4)(p)2 | |
| 2013 | Mohammedan Sporting Club | Sheikh Russel KC | 1(4)–(2)(p)1 | |
| 2025–26 | To be determined | | | |

== Statistics by club ==
| Team | Winner | Runners-up | Years won | Years runners-up |
|---|---|---|---|---|
| Mohammedan Sporting Club | 2 | 1 | 2009, 2013 | 2011 |
| Abahani Limited Dhaka | 1 | 1 | 2011 | 2009 |
| Sheikh Russel KC | 0 | 1 | | 2013 |

== Sponsorship ==
- 2009 : Citycell
- 2011 & 2013 : Grameenphone

== See also ==
- Dhaka Derby
- Football in Bangladesh
- List of Bangladeshi football champions
- Bangladesh Challenge Cup
