= 2007 B.League =

1st professional season of the top-flight football league in Bangladesh

B.League
- Season: 2007
- Dates: 2 March — 1 August
- Champions: Dhaka Abahani
- AFC President's Cup: Dhaka Abahani
- Matches: 110
- Goals: 273 (2.48 per match)
- Top goalscorer: (Nigeria) Junior Obagbemiro (16 goals)
- Biggest home win: Dhaka Mohammedan 7–0 Chittagong Mohammedan (20 June 2007)
- Biggest away win: Rahmatganj MFS 0–7 Dhaka Abahani (23 June 2007)
- Highest scoring: Dhaka Mohammedan 7–1 Rahmatganj MFS (13 April 2007)

The 2007 B.League was the 31st season of top-flight football in Bangladesh, and inaugural season of the country's first professional national football league, the B.League. The competitions included a total of 11 teams from which 8 were based in Dhaka, 2 from Chittagong and 1 team from Khulna. Sylhet DSA who were supposed to represent Sylhet withrew a month before the league began and the Bangladesh Football Federation decided against replacing them.

Previously, the Dhaka Senior Division League, was the country's top-tier football competition. However, it was not held after the 2004–05 season, which ended on 12 September 2005. Consequently, before the introduction of the professional league, the country went almost 18 months without any top-tier league football. Excluding the three relegated teams (Dhaka Wanderers, Fakirerpool YMC, and Dipali JS), seven teams from the previous top-flight season, along with Rahmatganj MFS, Chittagong Mohammedan SC, Chittagong Abahani, and Khulna Abahani SC, made up the inaugural season of the professional league.

Initially the season was set to start from January 2006 as part of The Vision Asia project guided by AFC. However, after numerous delays the transfer window was opened on 15 December 2006. The ceremonial draw for the competition was held on 22 February 2007. On 28 February 2007, Channel i were given the rights to broadcast 40 matches from the league. The league kicked off on 2 March 2007, with Dhaka Abahani and Muktijoddha Sangsad KC playing out a goalless draw. The a month-long mid-season transfer window opened on 16 May 2007.

The league concluded on 1 August 2007, with Dhaka Abahani winning the inaugural season.

== Teams ==
Initially, 12 teams were set to participate in the league; however, Sylhet DSA withdrew. The Dhaka Senior Division League, which was last held in 2004–05, served as the previous top-tier league. Excluding the three relegated clubs, the remaining seven clubs from that season, along with the 2004–05 Dhaka First Division League (second-tier from 1993 to 2005) champions, Rahmatganj MFS, were granted entry into the league. Additionally, three clubs—Chittagong Mohammedan SC, Chittagong Abahani and Khulna Abahani SC—received direct entry into the league.

Team	Location	Stadium	Capacity
Dhaka Abahani	Dhaka	Bangabandhu National Stadium	36,000
Dhaka Mohammedan	Dhaka	Bangabandhu National Stadium	36,000
Muktijoddha Sangsad KC	Dhaka	Bangabandhu National Stadium	36,000
Rahmatganj MFS	Dhaka	Bangabandhu National Stadium	36,000
Sheikh Russel KC	Dhaka	Bangabandhu National Stadium	36,000
Arambagh Krira Sangha	Dhaka	Bangabandhu National Stadium	36,000
Brothers Union	Dhaka	Bangabandhu National Stadium	36,000
Farashganj SC	Dhaka	Bangabandhu National Stadium	36,000
Chittagong Abahani	Chittagong	M. A. Aziz Stadium	20,000
Chittagong Mohammedan	Chittagong	M. A. Aziz Stadium	20,000
Khulna Abahani	Khulna	Khulna District Stadium	15,000

=== Personnel and sponsoring ===
Team	Head coach
Arambagh KS	(Bangladesh) Kazi Jolly
Brothers Union	(India) Syed Nayeemuddin
Chittagong Abahani	(Bangladesh) Sawpan Kumar Das
Chittagong Mohammedan	(Bangladesh) Nazrul Islam Ledu
Dhaka Abahani	(Bangladesh) Amalesh Sen
Dhaka Mohammedan	(Bangladesh) Shafiqul Islam Manik
Farashganj SC	(Bangladesh) Mir Mohammed Faruque
Khulna Abahani	(Bangladesh) Hemayet Ullah
Muktijoddha Sangsad KC	(Bangladesh) Abu Yusuf
Rahmatganj MFS	(Bangladesh) Motaleb Hossain
Sheikh Russel KC	(Bangladesh) Wazed Gazi

=== Coaching changes ===
Team	Outgoing head coach	Manner of departure	Date of vacancy	Position in table	Incoming head coach	Date of appointment	Source
Dhaka Abahani	(Argentina) Andres Cruciani	Mutual Consent	7 May 2007	1	(Bangladesh) Amalesh Sen	8 May 2007	

== League table ==
Pos	Team	Pld	W	D	L	GF	GA	GD	Pts	Qualification or relegation
1	Dhaka Abahani (C)	20	14	5	1	36	8	+28	47	Qualification for the AFC President's Cup group stage
2	Dhaka Mohammedan	20	11	7	2	40	13	+27	40	
3	Muktijoddha Sangsad	20	9	6	5	29	19	+10	33	
4	Sheikh Russel	20	8	9	3	23	13	+10	33	
5	Brothers Union	20	8	5	7	32	19	+13	29	
6	Arambagh KS	20	8	3	9	22	23	−1	27	
7	Chittagong Mohammedan	20	7	5	8	20	26	−6	26	
8	Farashganj SC	20	5	7	8	17	22	−5	22	
9	Khulna Abahani	20	4	4	12	21	43	−22	16	
10	Chittagong Abahani	20	4	3	13	18	39	−21	15	
11	Rahmatganj MFS	20	3	4	13	15	48	−33	13	

Source: RSSSF
Rules for classification: 1) points; 2) goal difference; 3) number of goals scored.
(C) Champions

== Statistics ==
There have been 273 goals scored in 110 matches, for an average of 2.48 goals per match. Source: archive.bff.com.bd

=== Top scorers ===
Rank	Player	Club	Goals
1	(Nigeria) Junior Obagbemiro	Brothers Union	16
2	(Nigeria) Paul Mawachukwu	Dhaka Mohammedan	14
3	(Nigeria) Christina Emeka	Dhaka Mohammedan	12
3	(Bangladesh) Zahid Hasan Ameli	Dhaka Abahani	12
5	(Bangladesh) Alfaz Ahmed	Muktijoddha Sangsad KS	8
5	(Kenya) Nicodemus Anunda Gichana	Arambagh KS	8
5	(Bangladesh) Mohamed Hedayetullah Robin	Farashganj SC	8
8	(Morocco) Touati Younes	Sheikh Russel KC	7
9	(Liberia) Abraham Bobby	Chittagong Abahani	6
9	(Ghana) Awudu Ibrahim	Dhaka Abahani	6
9	(Uganda) Iddi Badambuze	Arambagh KS	6
9	(Bangladesh) Saifur Rahman Moni	Muktijoddha Sangsad KS	6

=== Own goals ===
† Bold Club indicates winner of the match

Player	Club	Opponent	Result	Date
(Bangladesh) Sharif Khan	Arambagh KS	Brothers Union	1–3	3 April 2007
(Bangladesh) Mamun Khan	Farashganj SC	Rahmatganj MFS	1–1	3 April 2007

=== Hat-tricks ===
Player	For	Against	Result	Date	Ref
(Nigeria) Paul Mawachukwu^{6}	Dhaka Mohammedan	Rahmatganj MFS	7–1 (H)	13 March 2007	
(Bangladesh) Alfaz Ahmed	Muktijoddha Sangsad KC	Rahmatganj MFS	4–1 (A)	27 March 2007	
(Nigeria) Junior Obagbemiro	Brothers Union	Rahmatganj MFS	6–2 (A)	10 May 2007	
(Nigeria) Christina Emeka	Dhaka Mohammedan	Chittagong Mohammedan	7–0 (H)	7 June 2007	
(Nigeria) Junior Obagbemiro^{4}	Brothers Union	Khulna Abahani	5–0 (A)	10 June 2007	
(Bangladesh) Zahid Hasan Ameli^{4}	Dhaka Abahani	Rahmatganj MFS	7–0 (A)	7 June 2007	
(Nigeria) Christina Emeka	Dhaka Mohammedan	Rahmatganj MFS	3–1 (A)	7 July 2007	

== Awards ==
A prize distribution ceremony was held by the Bangladesh Football Federation on 5 August 2007.

=== Individual ===
Award	Player	Club	Reward
Highest Scorer	Junior Obagbemiro	Brothers Union	Tk 25,000
Best Player	Zahid Hasan Ameli	Dhaka Abahani	Tk 25,000
Fair Play Trophy		Chittagong Mohammedan	

=== Prize Money ===
Position	Club	Prize money
Champions	Dhaka Abahani	Tk 5 lakh
Runners-up	Dhaka Mohammedan	Tk 3 lakh
Third place	Muktijoddha Sangsad KC	Tk 2 lakh
Fourth place	Sheikh Russel KC	Tk 1 lakh
