= Atiqur Rahman Atique =

Bangladeshi association football player and coach

Atiqur Rahman
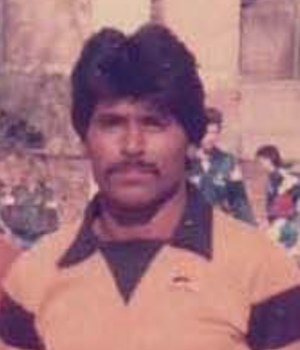
- Atique with Brothers Union in 1987

Personal information
- Full name: Md Atiqur Rahman Atique
- Date of birth: 25 December 1961 (age 64)
- Place of birth: Dhaka, East Pakistan (present-day Bangladesh)
- Height: 1.78 m (5 ft 10 in)
- Position: Goalkeeper

Team information
- Current team: Dhaka Abahani (goalkeeping coach)

Senior career*
Years	Team	Apps	(Gls)
1979–1980	BG Press S&RC		
1981–1982	Team BJMC		
1983–1984	Dhaka Abahani		
1985	Sadharan Bima		
1986–1995	Brothers Union		

International career
1982–1989	Bangladesh B		
1986–1988	Bangladesh		

Managerial career
- 1997–2010: Muktijoddha Sangsad (assistant coach)
- 2003: Bangladesh (assistant coach)
- 2007–2008: BG Press S&RC
- 2008: Bangladesh (goalkeeping coach)
- 2015–: Dhaka Abahani (goalkeeping coach)
- 2016: Bangladesh (goalkeeping coach)
- 2017–2018: Dhaka Abahani
- 2021: Bangladesh U23 (goalkeeping coach)
- 2021: Bangladesh (goalkeeping coach)
Medal record
Representing Bangladesh
South Asian Games
Silver medal – second place	1989
- * Club domestic league appearances and goals

Mohammed Atiqur Rahman (Bengali: মোহাম্মদ আতিকুর রহমান; born 25 December 1961), known by his nickname Atique, is a Bangladeshi football coach and former football player, who serves as the goalkeeping coach of Bangladesh Premier League club Abahani Limited Dhaka.

== Club career ==
In 1979, Atique began his playing career with BG Press in the Second Division. In 1981, he joined Team BJMC in the First Division. He won the league title in both 1983 and 1984 with Abahani Limited Dhaka. In 1986, he joined Brothers Union and played for them until his retirement in 1995.

== International career ==
Atique represented the Bangladesh B national team (Bangladesh Green) in 1982, 1983, 1986, and 1989 editions of the Bangladesh President's Gold Cup, captaining the team in 1989 when they defeated the India national team 1–0 in the group stages before losing to the Bangladesh national team in the semi-finals.

He first represented the senior national team at the Pakistan President's Cup held in Karachi in 1986. He also served as the backup goalkeeper to Sayeed Hassan Kanan at the 1987 South Asian Games, 1988 AFC Asian Cup qualifiers and 1989 South Asian Games.

== Coaching career ==
Atique served as the assistant and goalkeeping coach of Muktijoddha Sangsad KC for more than a decade starting from 1997. He also served as assistant coach of the Bangladesh national team during György Kottán's tenure as head coach in 2003. He also coached BG Press in the Second Division in 2008. In the same year, he was the goalkeeping coach of the national team under head coach Shafiqul Islam Manik. Eventually, he began joined Abahani Limited Dhaka as a goalkeeping coach. In 2016, he again served as the national team's goalkeeping coach, following the appointment of Gonzalo Sanchez Moreno.

In December 2017, Atique was given interim head coach duty of Abahani, following the mid-season departure of out of contract Croatian coach Drago Mamić on 30 November 2017. Atique guided the club to the 2017–18 Bangladesh Premier League title with the help of team manager Satyajit Das Rupu. The club dedicated the title to their lifelong coach and former player, Amalesh Sen, who died on 7 October 2017 and would have been the initial choice for interim head coach. Atique resumed his role as goalkeeping coach following the appointment of Saiful Bari Titu on 7 February 2018, for the club's 2018 AFC Cup campaign.

In 2021, he worked as the goalkeeper coach for both the Bangladesh U23 national team and the senior national team.

== Honours ==
=== Player ===
Abahani Limited Dhaka

- Dhaka First Division League: 1983, 1984

Brothers Union

- Federation Cup: 1991

Bangladesh

- South Asian Games Silver medal: 1989

=== Manager ===
Abahani Limited Dhaka

- Bangladesh Premier League: 2017–18

== Bibliography ==
- Alam, Masud (2017). ফুটবলের গল্প ফুটবলারদের গল্প (transl. The story of football the story of footballers) (in Bengali). Bishhoshahitto Bhobon. ISBN 9789849134688.
