= Kazi Jasimuddin Ahmed Joshi =

Bangladeshi footballer

Kazi Jasimuddin Ahmed
Personal information
- Full name: Kazi Jasimuddin Ahmed Joshi
- Date of birth: 2 November 1963 (age 62)
- Place of birth: Khulna, East Pakistan (present-day Bangladesh)
- Height: 1.75 m (5 ft 9 in)
- Position: Right winger

Senior career*
Years	Team	Apps	(Gls)
1981–1987	Mohammedan SC		
1988–1989	Agrani Bank SC		
1989–1990	Brothers Union		
1991–1992	Mohammedan SC		

International career
1984	Bangladesh U19		
1982–1988	Bangladesh		

Managerial career
- 1999: Mohammedan SC (assistant)
- 2005: Mohammedan SC
- 2009: Beanibazar SC
- 2013–2014: Mohammedan SC Jr.
- 2014–2016: Mohammedan SC
- 2016: Sheikh Jamal DC
- * Club domestic league appearances and goals

Kazi Jasimuddin Ahmed (Bengali: কাজী জসিম উদ্দিন আহমেদ; born 2 November 1963), known by his nickname Joshi, is a former Bangladeshi football player and coach.

== Early life ==
Joshi was born on 2 November 1963 in Khulna, Bangladesh to Shafi Uddin Ahmed and Kazi Arefa Ahmed. He grew up playing football near the Daulatpur Railway Station and was the seventh eldest among six brothers and three sisters, among which the eldest brother was martyred in the Bangladesh Liberation War. His brothers, Kazi Salahuddin and Kazi Jamiluddin Ahmed, were both footballers, with the latter also playing in the First Division during the 80s.

== Club career ==
In 1980, Joshi began playing in the Khulna League for WAPDA SC under the captaincy of former Shadhin Bangla football team goalkeeper, Aniruddha Chatterjee. The following year, Joshi joined First Division League club Mohammedan SC after impressing the club's coach, Golam Sarwar Tipu, during an exhibition match while playing for Khulna XI. From 1983 to 1984, Joshi achieved a rare feat by scoring against arch-rivals, Abahani Krira Chakra, during every single competitive encounter. On 14 July 1985, Joshi suffered a severe knee injury during a league game against Wari Club. He returned to the field in 1987, however, failed regain his previous form.

== International career ==
Joshi appeared for the Bangladesh Green team during the 1982 President's Gold Cup held on home soil. On 22 September 1983, Joshi made his senior international debut during a 1–0 victory over Nepal in the Merdeka Cup. Joshi also featured for the Bangladesh U19 team during the 1985 AFC Youth Championship qualifiers held in Dhaka. On 11 August 1984, he scored his first and only senior international goal during a 1–2 defeat to Syria in the 1984 AFC Asian Cup qualifiers. Joshi later appeared during both the 1986 FIFA World Cup qualifiers and the 1988 AFC Asian Cup qualifiers.

== Coaching career ==
=== Mohammedan SC (1999–2005) ===
In 1999, after completing his AFC C and B courses, Joshi served as assistant coach of Mohammedan SC under head coach, Hasanuzzaman Khan Bablu. Joshi first took on duty as head coach of Mohammedan during a 1–0 defeat to Muktijoddha Sangsad KC in the semi-final of the 2005 Federation Cup on 29 April 2005. He eventually guided the club to a runners-up finish in the Dhaka Premier Division League in the same year. He resigned at the end of the season and was replaced by former national teammate, Shafiqul Islam Manik.

=== Beanibazar SC (2009) ===
In August 2009, Joshi was appointed coach of Beanibazar SC in the 2009–10 Bangladesh League. Within a month of joining the Sylhet based outfit, Joshi voiced his dissatisfaction with the club's officials to local media. He resigned from his post on 23 December 2005, following a disagreement over team selection with the club management, and was replaced by unlicensed coach Ekramur Rahman Rana, providing further proof of the club's unprofessionalism.

=== Mohammedan SC (2014–2016) ===
Joshi guided the junior team of Mohammedan SC to triumphs in both the BFF U-16 Football Tournament and BFF U-18 Football Tournament in 2013 and 2014, respectively. On 25 November 2014, Joshi was appointed head coach of the senior team of Mohammedan, following his success with the youth team. Under him the Black and Whites finished in third place in the 2014–15 Bangladesh Premier League. However, the following season, the club for the first time since Bangladesh's independence, fought for relegation during the 2016 Bangladesh Premier League. Joshi resigned midway through the league on 7 October 2016, as Mohammedan recorded 6 draws and 3 defeats from 10 games. Joshi, however, later stated that his departure was due to unpaid wages.

=== Sheikh Jamal DC (2016) ===
Joshi served as the head coach of Sheikh Jamal Dhanmondi Club during the final two months of the 2016 Bangladesh Premier League and helped the club finish in third-place.

== Organising career ==
In 2022, Joshi was elected a member of the technical committee of Mohammedan SC.

== Personal life ==
Joshi married Saleha Parveen Mala on 28 December 1990, and they have a son and a daughter together.

== Career statistics ==
=== International goals ===
List of international goals scored by Kazi Jasimuddin Ahmed Joshi
No.	Date	Venue	Opponent	Score	Result	Competition	Ref.
1	11 August 1984	Senayan Stadium, Jakarta, Indonesia	Syria	1–1	1–2	1984 AFC Asian Cup qualification	

== Honours ==
=== Player ===
Mohammedan SC

- Dhaka First Division League: 1982, 1986, 1987
- Federation Cup: 1982, 1983, 1987
- Independence Cup: 1991
- DMFA Cup: 1984
- Ashis-Jabbar Shield Tournament (India): 1982

=== Manager ===
Mohammedan SC Jr.

- BFF U-18 Football Tournament: 2014

== Bibliography ==
- Alam, Masud (2017). ফুটবলের গল্প ফুটবলারদের গল্প (transl. The story of football the story of footballers) (in Bengali). Bishhoshahitto Bhobon. ISBN 9789849134688.
- Dulal, Mahmud (2020). খেলার মাঠে মুক্তিযুদ্ধ (transl. Liberation war in the playground) (in Bengali). Bishhoshahitto Bhobon. ISBN 978-984-8218-31-0.
