= Kazi Anwar Hossain =

Bangladeshi footballer

Kazi Anwar
Personal information
- Full name: Kazi Anwar Hossain
- Date of birth: 2 June 1957 (age 69)
- Place of birth: Rangpur, East Pakistan (now Rangpur, Bangladesh)
- Position: Right winger

Senior career*
Years	Team	Apps	(Gls)
1976–1984	Dhaka Abahani		
1985	Dhaka Wanderers		
1986	Dhanmondi Club		
1987–1989	PWD SC		

International career
1978–1981	Bangladesh U19		
1979–1983	Bangladesh		

Managerial career
- 1988–1989: PWD SC
- 1994: Dhaka Abahani (assistant)
- * Club domestic league appearances and goals

Kazi Anwar Hossain (Bengali: কাজী আনোয়ার হোসেন; born 2 June 1957) is a retired Bangladeshi football player and coach.

== Club career ==
Anwar made his First Division League debut in 1976 for Abahani Krira Chakra. He soon became a regular face in the starting eleven and scored a goal in the 1977 league deciding match against Rahmatganj MFS, a game Abahani won 3–1. With Abahani he won the league title four times during his 8-year-long stay at the club, and also captained them in 1982. After leaving Abahani in 1984, Anwar went on to play for Dhaka Wanderers and Dhanmondi Club before retiring in 1989 while playing for PWD Sports Club.

== International career ==
After the winger impressed during the 1978 AFC Youth Championship, joint-coaches Anwar Hossain and Anjam Hossain, gave Anwar his senior international debut in 1979. In his debut year for Bangladesh, he participated in both the 1980 AFC Asian Cup qualification and 1979 Korea Cup. Anwar also made the main squad for the 1980 AFC Asian Cup held in Kuwait. He also participated in the 1980 AFC Youth Championship after playing an integral role in qualification.

=== International goals ===
Scores and results list Bangladesh's goal tally first.

No.	Date	Venue	Opponent	Score	Result	Competition
1.	16 December 1980	Dhaka Stadium, Dhaka, Bangladesh	Qatar	Lost	1–2	1980 AFC Youth Championship qual.
2.	19 December 1980	Dhaka Stadium, Dhaka, Bangladesh	Oman	Won	2–0	1980 AFC Youth Championship qual.

== Black September 1982 ==
During his year as club captain in 1982, Anwar was involved in one of the most notorious incidents in Bangladeshi football, named as the "Black September" event. The incident took place during a Dhaka Derby in September 1982, when three Abahani players (Kazi Salahuddin, Golam Rabbani Helal, Ashrafuddin Ahmed Chunnu) alongside Anwar were arrested for protesting the referee's decision which later progressed into a fight involving the respective fans. Surprisingly, the court held Anwar and his teammates responsible for conspiring a potential military coup, against military government Hussain Muhammad Ershad. Although Anwar was sentenced to one year in prison, he along with the other four footballers were released after 17 days.

== Coaching career ==
Anwar holds an AFC C License and has coached the likes of Wari Club, PWD SC and Eskaton Sabuj Sangha Club. He also established the Kazi Anwar Football Academy in 1997. The academy later went on to participate in the Pioneer Football League.

== Honours ==
Abahani Limited Dhaka

- Dhaka First Division League: 1977, 1981, 1983, 1984
- Liberation Cup: 1977
- Federation Cup: 1982

Individual

- 2018 − National Sports Award.
