= Narayanganj Osmani Stadium =

Sports stadium in Bangladesh

Coordinates: 23°37′39.52″N 90°29′35.68″E

- Osmani Stadium
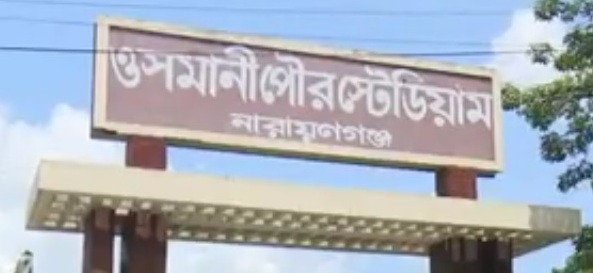
- Interactive map of Narayanganj Osmani Stadium
- Location: Narayanganj District, Bangladesh
- Owner: National Sports Council
- Operator: Narayanganj District Sports Association
- Capacity: 4,000
- Surface: Grass
- Acreage: 8.5

Construction
- Groundbreaking: 1965
- Opened: 1973
- Rebuilt: 2017

Tenant
- Narayanganj Suktara Sangsad (2009–10)

Narayanganj Osmani Stadium, also known as the Osmani Powro Stadium, is a football stadium located about 600 meters away from Chashara Bus Stand in Narayanganj Sadar Upazila. It was the home venue for Narayanganj's very own football club, Narayanganj Suktara Sangsad, during the 2009–10 Bangladesh League season.

== History ==
In 1965, eight and a half acres of this stadium were developed as the Narayanganj Municipal Sports Ground. After independence, the ground was declared as a stadium. In 1973, the Narayanganj Municipality constructed the stadium pavilion. In 1978, the Narayanganj City Development Committee built a gallery on the western side of the ground, which still stands. In 1986, it was handed over to the District Sports Association.

== See also ==
- Fatullah Osmani Stadium
- Stadiums in Bangladesh
- List of football stadiums in Bangladesh
