= Golam Rabbani Helal =

Bangladeshi footballer (c. 1952–2020)

Personal information
- Full name: Golam Rabbani Helal
- Date of birth: c. 1953
- Place of birth: Barisal, East Bengal, Pakistan (present-day Bangladesh)
- Date of death: 30 May 2020 (aged 67)
- Place of death: Dhaka, Bangladesh
- Positions: Right winger; right wing-back

Senior career*
Years	Team	Apps	(Gls)
1975–1980	Dhaka Abahani		
1981	Team BJMC		
1982–1988	Dhaka Abahani		

International career
1978	Bangladesh U19		
1979–1982	Bangladesh		
1981	Bangladesh B		
- * Club domestic league appearances and goals

Golam Rabbani Helal (Bengali: গোলাম রব্বানী হেলাল; c. 1953 – 30 May 2020) was a Bangladeshi football player and organizer.

== Playing career ==
Helal played for the Bangladesh national team from 1979 to 1982. He also played for Dhaka Abahani from 1975 to 1988. He briefly played for the Team BJMC.

Helal was arrested in 1982 after both attacking the referee and engaging in a brawl with players of Mohammedan Sporting Club, arch rivals of Abahani, during a league match. This incident, which took place on 21 September, is seen as one of the most notorious moments in the rivalry between Abahani and Mohammedan. Alongside Helal, three other players, Ashraf Uddin Ahmed Chunnu, Kazi Anwar Hossain, and Kazi Salahuddin were also arrested.

== Administrative career ==
After retiring from playing he became a director of Abahani. In April 2008, his candidacy for the Bangladesh Football Federation was challenged in court by Shamsul Haque Chowdhury. The court dismissed the charges and cleared the way for him to contest the election. On 10 July 2008, he was made a member of Dhaka Metropolis League Committee. From 2008 to 2012, he was an executive member of Bangladesh Football Federation. On 11 December 2011, he resigned from the National Team Management Committee of the Bangladesh Football Federation after describing them as inefficient and ineffective.

Helal was to contest the Bangladesh Football Federation for the post of President in 2012. He withdrew his candidacy and threw his support behind the incumbent, Kazi Salahuddin.

== Death ==
Helal died on 30 May 2020 at Square Hospital, Dhaka, Bangladesh. He was being treated for brain haemorrhage. He was buried in Azimpur Graveyard.

== Honours ==
Dhaka Abahani

- Dhaka First Division League: 1977, 1983, 1984, 1985
- Federation Cup: 1982, 1985, 1986, 1988
