= Kazi Salahuddin =

Bangladeshi footballer and coach

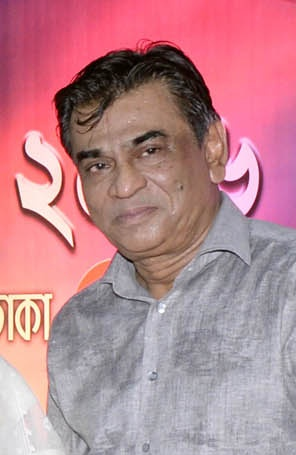
- Salahuddin in 2016

Personal information
- Full name: Kazi Salahuddin
- Date of birth: 23 September 1953 (age 73)
- Place of birth: Dacca, East Bengal, Pakistan (present-day Dhaka, Bangladesh)
- Height: 1.68 m (5 ft 6 in)
- Position: Striker

Youth career
- 1966: Gamma Sports Association

Senior career*
Years	Team	Apps	(Gls)
1968	Dilkusha		(14)
1969	Wari Club		(18)
1970–1972	Mohammedan	3	(3)
1972–1975	Dhaka Abahani		(56)
1975–1976	Caroline Hill	18	(0)
1976–1984	Dhaka Abahani		(86)
Total		21+	(177)

International career
1971	Shadhin Bangla		
1973–1983	Bangladesh	29	(9)

Managerial career
- 1985–1987: Dhaka Abahani
- 1985–1986: Bangladesh
- 1988: Bangladesh
- 1988–1989: Brothers Union
- 1990–1994: Dhaka Abahani
- 1993–1994: Bangladesh
- 1994–1994: Muktijoddha Sangsad
- * Club domestic league appearances and goals

Kazi Salahuddin (Bengali: কাজী সালাউদ্দিন; born 23 September 1953) is a Bangladeshi retired football player currently serving as the president of South Asian Football Federation. He previously served as the president of Bangladesh Football Federation from 2008 to 2024. He was a member of the Shadhin Bangla Football Team, which played across India to raise awareness about the Bangladesh Liberation War in 1971. He played for and captained the Bangladesh national team, retiring in 1983. Salahuddin is the first football player from the country to play abroad in the professional league in Hong Kong and is considered to be Bangladesh's first professional sports athlete.

In domestic football, he has 163 goals in the First Division and 14 goals in the Dhaka Second Division League. He is the second highest goal scorer in Bangladeshi top-tier football and is one of the two players to have scored 150 goals in domestic football, both his records come second to Sheikh Mohammad Aslam. In international football he has scored 9 goals for the Bangladesh national team in 29 official games. He holds the record of scoring the country's first ever goal at the AFC Asian Cup, coming in their maiden appearance in the tournament in 1980. He has been First Division's top scorer four times, in 1973, 1977, 1979 and 1980.

Salahuddin was appointed as the head coach of Bangladesh on four occasions, in 1985, 1987, 1993 and 1994. As the coach of his former club Dhaka Abahani, he won the First Division in 1985 and 1992. Salahuddin also had less successful coaching spells with Brothers Union and Muktijoddha Sangsad in 1988 and 1994 respectively. As the president of Bangladesh Football Federation, he introduced the Bangladesh Super Cup in 2009 and a second-tier professional league, the Bangladesh Championship League in 2012.

His contribution to football has seen him win numerous accolades, most notably the Independence Day Award in 1996, which is the highest state award in Bangladesh. He was also named as the Sports Writers Association's Best Football Player and Best Coach in 1979 and 1992 respectively.

== Early life ==
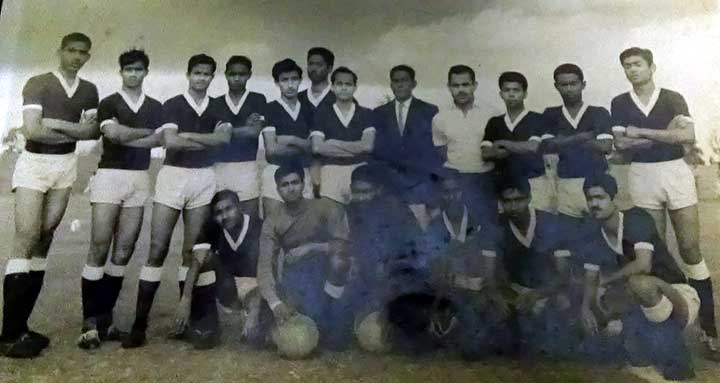
Salahuddin (standing furthest to the left) with the East Pakistan Youth Football Team in 1968.

Kazi Salahuddin was born on 23 September 1953 to an elite family in Dacca, East Bengal. His father, Kazi Muhammad Shahi, was a businessman, and his mother, Begum Simki Shafi, was a housewife. He belongs to the Kazi family of Rajapur in Faridpur District. The family was founded by Kazi Abdur Rasool, son of Shah Azimuddin, who had been appointed as Kazi in Mughal Bengal.

He was enrolled in BAF Shaheen College Dhaka before moving to Dhaka College and eventually got into Dhaka University. While Salahuddin was in seventh grade at Shaheen College, he became involved with athletics and was selected for his school football team as the youngest member of the team. This attracted the interest of ex-Pakistani international footballer Rashid Chunna. In 1966, he played two matches as a goalkeeper for Gamma Sports Association in the Dhaka Third Division League. In 1968, Salahuddin started playing cricket for Azad Boys in the Premier Division Cricket League. Later that year, at the request of his sports teacher, Salahuddin played as a striker for Dilkusha SC in Dhaka Second Division League. Following a troublesome period, Dilkusha won the championship that season and were promoted to the top-tier, the First Division, while Salahuddin became the second division's highest goal scorer with 14 goals.

In 1968, Salahuddin was called up to the East Pakistan Youth Team for the Pakistan National Youth Championship, and in the following year, Abdul Hashem, impressed by the young striker, signed him for Wari Club in the First Division. In his first league game with Wari, he scored a hat-trick against Rahmatganj MFS, and ended the season with a total of 18 league goals. By his first season at the top-tier, Salahuddin had made a name for himself as the country's youngest football prospect and, in 1970, he was snatched up by Mohammedan SC, the leading club of East Pakistan. Salahuddin spent his debut season as a reserve player, scoring 3 goals in 3 appearances. He netted a brace against Wari Club and added a lone strike against Azad SC. His team eventually withdrew from the league due to a dispute with the East Pakistan Football Federation (EPSF), and when the Bangladesh Liberation War began in 1971, league football was suspended for more than a year.

== Playing career ==
=== Shadhin Bangla Football Team ===
At the start of 1971, Salahuddin went to West Pakistan to play in the regional championship for Dhaka. After the tournament he was called to join the camp for the Pakistan national team. He came back to Dhaka on 20 March but was only in the country for five days when a planned military pacification carried out by the Pakistan Army to curb the Bengali nationalist movement in erstwhile East Pakistan called Operation Searchlight started. His family wanted him to go to London, however, Salahuddin wanted to take part in the Bangladesh Liberation War. His father agreed and he crossed the border to reach Agartala where he joined the training camp for the guerilla soldiers. In 1971, he heard about Shadhin Bangla football team, a team of Bangladeshi football players who played in India to raise money and awareness about the war, from a photo journalist. The journalist, from Kolkata, convinced him to play for the team and explained to him the importance about growing public support for the war. Salahuddin decided to play and went to Kolkata on a Cargo Plane of the Indian Air Force. In Kolkata, he met with many of his teammates from Dhaka and played his first match for the team against Nadia XI, from Nadia district, on 25 July 1971. That day Salahuddin accompanied Enayetur Rahman Khan, in the team's forward line, as the game ended 2–2. He played under an alias; Turya Hazra. After that match, Salahuddin and his teammates played against Mohun Bagan AC, a top team from Kolkata. For diplomatic reasons Mohan Bagan used the name 'Gostha Pal XI'. Gostha Pal, a central defender nicknamed 'the Chinese Wall' had played with great distinction for Mohan Bagan in the early part of the 20th century. Pal was originally from Faridpur, now part of Bangladesh. Salahuddin carried on to play in different parts of India with his team to raise money and create public support for Bangladesh.

=== Mohammedan SC and Dhaka XI ===
Following the independence of Bangladesh, Salahuddin came back to the country, and played the first football match in Independent Bangladesh as the Bangladesh XI took on the President XI, on 13 February 1972. Salahuddin's team lost to President XI 0–2. In the same year, he played for Mohammedan during the first edition of the Independence Cup, which was held to celebrate the country's liberation. In the final against East End Club, Salahuddin scored a brace as Mohammedan SC won the game 3–1 (the other goal was scored by Aminul Islam).

On 11 May 1972, India's Mohun Bagan AC, who were the first foreign football club to visit independent Bangladesh, took on Mohammedan SC (as they were the first Independence Cup champions), again as the "Gostha Pal XI", as Bangladesh were not a FIFA member at the time. After losing the first friendly (1–0), with Salahuddin and majority of the MSC squad were called up to the "Dhaka XI" squad.

On 13 May, Mohun Bagan took on the "Dhaka XI", who were the unofficial Bangladesh national team, consisting of the best players in the country at the time. The game was highly anticipated, with Bangladesh's president Sheikh Mujibur Rahman (a former footballer himself) present at the Dhaka Stadium to witness the game. Salahuddin volley earned Dhaka XI the win, a goal which was later praised by Mohun Bagan's Chuni Goswami, while the Kolkata team's captain Syed Nayeemuddin even went on to say that the goal was one of the best he had seen.

Salauddin gave Bangladesh football hope.

— Dainik Bangla on Salahuddin's goal against Mohun Bagan.

During the latter stages of 1972, Salahuddin and the Dhaka XI took part in India's Guwahati to partake in the Bordoloi Trophy. He became the first Bangladeshi player to score on foreign soil, as the Dhaka XI defeated George Telegraph 2–0 (Nowsheruzzaman scored the other goal). His team finished the tournament as runner-up, losing to East Bengal in the final, and by the end of the year, Salahuddin had established himself as Bangladesh's first sports icon.

=== Success with Abahani ===
In 1972, Sheikh Kamal, Mujib's son and the chief patron of Abahani Krira Chakra, asked him to join the newly formed club, which was the first club formed in independent Bangladesh. Salahuddin refused and told him that he would only join if the team was strong. In the meantime during the football off season, he played cricket for Azad Boys and made his career best score of 94 runs against Abahani cricket team. Eventually he decided to focus more on football and refused a call from the national cricket squad. By that time Kamal had managed to sign seven national team members for Abahani, including players from the country's top three clubs Mohammedan SC, Dhaka Wanderers and Team BJMC. Eventually, Salahuddin joined the team before the 1972 Dhaka First Division Football League got underway.

In 1973, Salahuddin became the first player after independence to score 7 goals in a league game, as Abahani thrashed his former club Dilkusha SC 10–0. The other goal scorers were, Abdul Ghafoor (Scooter), Amalesh Sen and Golam Sarwar Tipu. A few days before Salahuddin, Mohammedan's Hafizuddin Ahmed became the first player in independent Bangladesh to score a double hat trick in the First Division.

Aside from his short stint in Hong Kong, Salahuddin stayed at Abahani until his retirement as a player in 1984. He won the First Division title with the sky blues in 1974, 1977, 1981, 1983, and 1984. He was the highest scorer in the league for four seasons, first in 1973 when he scored 24 goals, then again in 1977 and 1979 respectively with 14 goals, and for the last time in the 1980 First Division with 15 goals. In 1974, he had also scored 15 goals however, finished as the second top scorer with one less than Dilkusha's striker Golam Shahid Neelu. In 1975, Salahuddin scored 18 goals for runners-up, Abahani. In 1978, during an injury hit season, he scored 8 goals in 7 games. He was also lethal in continental competition, scoring a brace against Afghanistan in the Aga Khan Gold Cup in 1979.

Throughout his Abahani career he had great understanding with the attacking midfielders. Monwar Hossain Nannu, Amalesh Sen and Kurshed Babul provided him with plenty of assists. Also, his combination with left winger Ashrafuddin Ahmed Chunnu served both the club and then national team greatly for almost a decade. Two of his most memorable goals for Abahani, came in a long distance winner against Rahmantganj MFS during Abahani's journey to the league title that year, and in 1979 when he scored against Kolkata Mohammedan from India.

In September 1982, Abahani star players, Kazi Salahuddin, Chunnu, Golam Rabbani Helal and Kazi Anwar were arrested after a league game against Mohammedan SC, due to violently protesting the referee's decision. However, the court held them accountable for conspiring a military coup against Hussain Muhammad Ershad, who was the country's dictator at the time. Salahuddin and Chunnu were given a sentence of one month while the others were sent to jail for 6 months. However, with local football's popularity at the time being at its peak, all four footballers were released after 17 days, due to massive protests all over the country. The event was later branded as the "Black September" of Bangladeshi football.

In 1984, at the peak of his form, Salahuddin decided to retire from football. His goal in the league deciding match against Brothers Union brought Abahani the title. On 19 October 1984, he played his last competitive game against rivals Mohammedan SC in the final matchday of the league season. Before the game commenced he was given a standing ovation by the rival fans, at a time when the Dhaka Derby was one of the most violent games in the subcontinent. He finished his career as the club's all-time top scorer with 121 goals from about 146 games. The following year he replaced Ali Imam as the club's coach and completed his hattrick of league titles.

=== International debut and Hong Kong league ===
Salahuddin made his debut for the Bangladesh national football team in 1973, when they were invited to participate in the 1973 Merdeka Cup, held in Malaysia. On 27 July 1973, Salahuddin scored in Bangladesh's first official game, a 2–2 draw with Thailand. His goal was the country's second ever international goal, as Bangladesh went onto lose the penalty shootout of the group allocation match 5–6. During the same tournament, Salahuddin also found the net against Singapore (1–1).

After a year without international football, Salahuddin and his team were invited to take part in the 1975 edition of the Meedeka Cup. During the tournament newly appointed captain, Salahuddin scored against Thailand, Hong Kong and Burma, except for his strike against Thailand (1–1), all his goals coming in heavy defeats. However, his solo goal against Hong Kong earned him interest from abroad. At the end of the 1975 Merdeka Cup he and his teammates learned of the Assassination of Sheikh Mujib. Returning to Dhaka, Salahuddin saw his fellow Abahani players and staff devastated and thus, decided to leave the country. He accepted the proposal to play in the Hong Kong First Division League, in 1975, which was at the time the only professional football league in Asia. There he played for Caroline Hill for one season. He played 18 league games for the club, and eventually returned to Abahani the following year. The move made Salahuddin the first ever Bangladeshi football player to have an appearance for a foreign football club in a professional football League, in Bangladesh football history.

Salahuddin along with 6 other Abahani players withdrew from Bangladesh's 1978 Asian Games final squad, after Abahani captain and the country's senior most player at the time Monwar Hossain Nannu was stripped of the captaincy by officials. In 1979, Salahuddin returned to the national team during Bangladesh's first attempt at qualifying for the AFC Asian Cup. During the qualifying stage Salahuddin had created a striking partnership with Ashrafuddin Ahmed Chunnu and Abdul Halim, and the trio's goals guided Bangladesh to the main tournament. Salahuddin's goals at the qualifiers came in a 1–3 defeat against middle eastern giants Qatar and in a 3–2 victory over Afghanistan, where Salahuddin scored the winning goal which eventually confirmed Bangladesh's 1980 AFC Asian Cup berth. On 16 September 1980, during the 1980 Asian Cup in Kuwait, Salahuddin became the first Bangladeshi goal scorer at the main stage of the Asian Cup, with his penalty against North Korea. The game ended as a 2–3 loss, but is still considered to be one of Bangladesh's greatest ever performances.

Due to the bias held against Abahani players after the 1982 Military Coup, Salahuddin was denied a chance to join the Bangladesh team at the 1982 Quaid-e-Azam, in Pakistan, only to make his return during the 1982 Bangladesh President's Gold Cup. With Salahuddin being arrested alongside his Abahani teammates (Chunnu, Helal and Kazi Anwar) during the Black September event, he was yet again left out of the national team, missing the 1982 Asian Games. In the end Salahuddin retired from the Bangladesh national team after the 1983 President's Gold Cup. In total he made 29 official appearances for the national team and scored 9 times.

== Coaching career ==
After retiring from football, Kazi Salahuddin took on the coaching profession. He became the coach of Abahani Limited Dhaka in 1985, replacing his former coach Ali Imam as the club's head coach. The same year, Salahuddin completed his hattrick of titles by winning the 1985 First Division, despite Ali Imam's Brothers Union team giving Abahani a fight till the end. Abahani's historic hattrick league triumph meant that Salahuddin had won the first two titles as a player (1983 & 1984) and the final one as the coach, which is a unique record in Bangladesh's domestic football.

Salahuddin also became the head coach of the Bangladesh national team the same year for the 1985 South Asian Games, while still being part of the Abahani coaching panel. He was also incharge of the Bangladesh Red team (main national team) during the President's Gold Cup, in 1986. Although at the tournament, Bangladesh faced club sides and second string national teams, they finished sixth in a 7 team group.

In 1987, Salahuddin was appointed head coach of the Bangladesh Blue team at the 1987 President's Gold Cup, the team is assumed to be the junior national team consisting of players from Abahani. His side caused a major upset by defeating the Syria national team, thanks to a goal from Fakrul Kamal. Salahuddin was in charge of Abahani until 1987, and in 1988, he coached Bangladesh once more, and this time during the 1988 AFC Asian Cup qualifiers in Abu Dhabi. After a season with Brothers Union, Salahuddin was rehired as Abahani's coach in 1991. On his return he guided the team to the league title as undefeated champions in 1991–92.

In 1994, Salahuddin resigned from Abahani, and joined Muktijoddha Sangsad, while protesting the gentlemen's agreement between Mohammedan-Brothers and Abahani which lowered player salaries. Salahuddin and Muktijoddha were sent to Qatar by the Bangladesh Football Federation to take part in the Qatar Independence Cup, representing the Bangladesh national team. Fourteen players from Muktijoddha along with three guest players were selected, and the club also wore its own jersey during the entirety of the tournament. He guided the team to 1–0 victory over Yemen, but they were eventually defeated by India in the group deciding game.

== Organizer ==
Salahuddin became the vice-president of the Bangladesh Football Federation (BFF) in 2003 and subsequently assumed the chairmanship of the National Team Management Committee. Initially, he stepped down from his position following a controversial move by BFF president SA Sultan, who attempted to appoint Amirul Islam Babu as the team manager of the Bangladesh U20 team. On 15 November 2005, Salahuddin withdrew his resignation upon the request of the BFF president. However, on 31 July 2006, he again resigned from his post after Sultan appointed Amirul Islam Babu as the team manager of the 2006 South Asian Games bound olympic national team against the recommendation of the National Team Management Committee. In his final interview before resignation Salahuddin stated, "Liar president (Sultan).... He is unethical.... morally corrupt. It is simply impossible for me to work under the same roof with a complete liar like him."

On 28 April 2008, Salahuddin was elected as the president of BFF. Following his election, he secured a three-year sponsorship deal worth BDT 160,000,000 (equivalent to USD 2,285,714 appx) with the multinational mobile operator Pacific Bangladesh Telecom Limited (Citycell), setting a record in the country's football history. On 3 October 2009, during the South Asian Football Federation (SAFF) Election Congress in Dhaka, Salahuddin was elected as the uncontested president of SAFF. He was also selected as a member of the FIFA Technical & Development Committee, one of the standing committees of FIFA, on 3 December 2009. Salahuddin had been elected BFF president for four consecutive terms, for a total of 16 years from 2008 to 2024. He has also been elected SAFF president for four consecutive terms in 2009-2014 (Term 1), 2014-2018 (Term 2), 2018-2022 (Term 3), 2022-2026 (Term 4).

Salahuddin, according to many, is recognized as the first ever true sporting superstar of Bangladesh due to his achievements both on and off the field. He was the first ever player to play abroad and score many vital goals for both club and country. He is one of the two players who scored for Bangladesh in the AFC Asian Cup in 1980, during the first and only appearance for the country in the tournament, to date. As the president of the Bangladesh Football Federation, he has regularly organized the professional league in Bangladesh, while also introducing a second-tier professional league, the Bangladesh Championship League in 2012. In 2009, he organized the koti takar khela' (Million dollar game) between Mohammedan and Abahani which was the final of the first ever Super Cup tournament in Bangladesh. His most notable achievement was to bring the Argentina national football team along with superstar Lionel Messi to Bangladesh in 2011, in order to play a friendly game against Nigeria. Despite his achievements, he is widely criticized for the recent downturn in Bangladeshi football as the nation's ranking had stooped to its lowest ever position 196, in 2018.

== Career statistics ==
=== Club ===
Appearances and goals by club, season and competition
Club	Season	League			Cup		Other		Continental		Total	
Club	Season	Division	Apps	Goals	Apps	Goals	Apps	Goals	Apps	Goals	Apps	Goals
Dilkusha SC	1968	Dhaka Second Division	?	14	—		—		—		?	14
Dilkusha SC	Total		?	14	—		—		—		?	14
Wari Club Dhaka	1969	Dhaka First Division	?	18	—		—		—		?	18
Mohammedan SC
Mohammedan SC	1970	Dhaka First Division	3	3	—		—		? (Note: Appearance(s) in Aga Khan Gold Cup)	?	3	3
Mohammedan SC	1972	Dhaka First Division	0	0	—		? (Note: Appearance(s) in Independence Cup)	5	—		?	5
Dhaka Abahani	1972	Dhaka First Division	— (Note: Salahuddin scored 3 goals in the eventually cancelled Dhaka First Division League season.)		—		—		—		2	0
Dhaka Abahani	1973	Dhaka First Division	?	24	—		—		—		?	24
Dhaka Abahani	1974	Dhaka First Division	?	14	—		—		—		?	14
Dhaka Abahani	1975	Dhaka First Division	?	18	—		—		—		?	18
Dhaka Abahani	Total		2+	74	—		?	5	—		2+	79
Caroline Hill FC	1975–76	Hong Kong First Division	18	0	—		—		—		18	0
Caroline Hill FC	Total		18	0	—		—		—		18	0
Dhaka Abahani	1976	Dhaka First Division	?	5	—		—		—		?	5
Dhaka Abahani	1977	Dhaka First Division	?	14	—		—		?	?	?	14
Dhaka Abahani	1978	Dhaka First Division	7	8	—		—		—		7	8
Dhaka Abahani	1979	Dhaka First Division	?	14	—		—		?	5	?	19
Dhaka Abahani	1980	Dhaka First Division	?	15	? (Note: Appearance(s) in Federation Cup)	?	—		—		?	15
Dhaka Abahani	1981	Dhaka First Division	?	7	?	?	—		?	?	?	7
Dhaka Abahani	1982	Dhaka First Division	?	8	?	?	—		—		?	8
Dhaka Abahani	1983	Dhaka First Division	?	10	?	?	—		—		?	10
Dhaka Abahani	1984	Dhaka First Division	?	5	?	?	—		—		?	5
Dhaka Abahani	Total		7+	86	—		?	?	?	5	7+	91+
Career total			30+	174	?	?	?	5	?	5	30+	187+

=== International ===
Appearances and goals by national team and year
National team	Year	Apps	Goals
Bangladesh	1973	7	2
Bangladesh	1975	7	3
Bangladesh	1979	8	2
Bangladesh	1980	4	1
Bangladesh	1981	1	1
Bangladesh	1983	2	0
Career total		29	9

Appearances and goals by competition
Competition	Apps	Goals
Merdeka Tournament	13	5
Friendlies	1	0
AFC Asian Cup qualification	4	2
Presidents Cup	4	0
AFC Asian Cup	4	1
President's Gold Cup	3	1
Total	29	9

Scores and results list Bangladesh's goal tally first.

List of international goals scored by Kazi Salahuddin
No.	Date	Venue	Opponent	Score	Result	Competition	Ref.
1	27 July 1973	Stadium Merdeka, Kuala Lumpur, Malaysia	Thailand	2–1	2(5)–2(6)	1973 Merdeka Tournament	
2	2 August 1973	Stadium Merdeka, Kuala Lumpur, Malaysia	Singapore	1–0	1–1	1973 Merdeka Tournament	
3	2 August 1975	Stadium Merdeka, Kuala Lumpur, Malaysia	Thailand	1–1	1–1	1975 Merdeka Tournament	
4	8 August 1975	Stadium Merdeka, Kuala Lumpur, Malaysia	Burma	1–6	1–7	1975 Merdeka Tournament	
5	10 August 1975	Stadium Merdeka, Kuala Lumpur, Malaysia	Hong Kong	1–9	1–9	1975 Merdeka Tournament	
6	5 March 1979	Dhaka Stadium, Dhaka, Bangladesh	Afghanistan	3–2	3–2	1980 AFC Asian Cup qualification	
7	7 March 1979	Dhaka Stadium, Dhaka, Bangladesh	Qatar	1–2	1–3	1980 AFC Asian Cup qualification	
8	16 September 1980	Sabah Al-Salem Stadium, Kuwait City, Kuwait	North Korea	1–2	2–3	1980 AFC Asian Cup	
9	31 March 1981	Dhaka Stadium, Dhaka, Bangladesh	Nepal	1–1	1–1	1981 President's Gold Cup	

=== Managerial ===
As of 12 September 1994

Team	From	To	P	W	D	L	GS	GA	%W
Bangladesh	December 1985	January 1996	3	2	1	0	11	2	66.67
Bangladesh	December 1987	February 1988	5	0	3	2	1	9	0.00
Bangladesh	March 1993	May 1993	8	2	0	6	7	28	25.00
Bangladesh	September 1994	September 1994	2	1	0	1	3	4	50.00

== Honours ==
=== Player ===
Dilkusha SC

- Dhaka Second Division League: 1968

Mohammedan SC

- Independence Cup: 1972

Dhaka Abahani

- Dhaka First Division League: 1974, 1977, 1979, 1983, 1984
- Federation Cup: 1982,1984

=== Individual ===
- Dhaka Second Division League top scorer: 1968
- Dhaka First Division League top scorer: 1973
- Dhaka First Division League top scorer: 1977
- Dhaka First Division League top scorer: 1979
- Dhaka First Division League top scorer: 1980

=== Manager ===
Dhaka Abahani

- Dhaka First Division League: 1985, 1991–92
- Federation Cup: 1985

Muktijoddha Sangsad KC

- Federation Cup: 1994

=== Awards and accolades ===
- 1979 − Sports Writers Association's Best Footballer Award
- 1992 − Sports Writers Association's Best Coach Award
- 1996 − Independence Day Award

== See also ==
- List of Bangladesh national football team managers

== Bibliography ==
- Mahmud, Dulal (2020). খেলার মাঠে মুক্তিযুদ্ধ (transl. Liberation war in the playground) (in Bengali). Bishhoshahitto Bhobon. ISBN 978-984-8218-31-0.
- Alam, Masud (2017). ফুটবলের গল্প ফুটবলারদের গল্প (transl. The story of football the story of footballers) (in Bengali). Bishhoshahitto Bhobon. ISBN 9789849134688.
- Mahmud, Noman (2018). ফুটবল পায়ে মুক্তির যুদ্ধ (transl. Liberation war fought by football) (in Bengali). Agamee Prakashani. ISBN 978-984-8218-31-0.
- "Kazi Salahuddin: Bangladesh football's first superstar". FIFA. 31 March 2023. Archived from the original on 7 June 2023.
