= Beanibazar SC =

- Full name: Biyanibazar Sporting Club
- Nickname(s): The Sylhetians
- Founded: 2009; 16 years ago
- Ground: Sylhet District Stadium; Sylhet, Bangladesh
- Capacity: 15,000
- League: Bangladesh Championship League
- 2011–2012: 4th
- Website: http://www.beanibazarsc.ewebsite.com

Beanibazar Sporting Club is a Bangladeshi football club from Beanibazar, Sylhet.

== History ==
Beanibazar Sporting Club was formed in 2009 as a professional football club to take part in the Bangladesh League. In the 2009–10 season, however, they were relegated along with Sukhtara Sangsad, a football club from Narayanganj, joining the Bangladesh Championship League, the 2nd division in Bangladesh. Despite this, It is one of the most powerful football clubs in Sylhet. During their short stay in the top flight, they were coached by former national team player Jasimuddin Ahmed Joshi and also former Mohammedan SC player Ekramur Hossain Rana.

== The club's name ==
There is much confusion with the club's name in the Bangladeshi media. Various channels and websites mention various spellings of the club's name, e.g. Beanibazar, Biyanibazar, Biyanibazar FC, Biyanibazar Sporting Club. Although the club's website names it "Beanibazar Sporting Club" it provides no information on it.
