= Dhaka derby =

Association football rivalry in Bangladesh

- Location: Dhaka
- Teams: Abahani; Mohammedan
- First meeting: Abahani 2–0 Mohammedan (1973); First Division
- Latest meeting: Abahani 2–1 Mohammedan (10 April 2026); 2026 Football League
- Next meeting: 10 April 2026
- Stadiums: Dhaka National Stadium (Both)Comilla Stadium (Both)

Statistics
- Total meetings: 43 (from 2007)
- Most wins: Abahani (18)
- All-time record: Abahani: 18; Draw: 13; Mohammedan: 12
- Largest victory: Mohammedan 4–0 Abahani (16 July 2019); 2019 Premier League; Abahani 4–0 Mohammedan (4 March 2020); 2020 Premier League
- Largest goal scoring: Mohammedan 4–4 Abahani (30 May 2022); 2022–23 Federation Cup

The Dhaka Derby is a football rivalry between the Dhaka teams of Abahani and Mohammedan; although the rivalry was bigger in the past, it is still considered to be the biggest game in Bangladesh's domestic football scene.

Mohammedan was founded in 1936, and Abahani in 1972. Bangladesh football's popularity grew based on these two Dhaka clubs. The two clubs have divided the country's fans into two camps in a fierce rivalry of more than 50 years. The two clubs meet several times a year in competitions like the Bangladesh Football League, Federation Cup, Independence Cup.

== History ==
=== 1970s–1990s ===
The two sides first met in 1973 in Dhaka First Division League. During that match, Abahani player Amalesh Sen scored the first goal in the history of Dhaka derby. Salahuddin scored the second goal for Abahani and the Abahani won that match by 2–0 and caused an upset over the mighty Black and Whites.

In 1978, Bangladesh participated in Asian Games for the first time. Monwar Hossain Nannu, being the senior most player in the squad, was originally nominated as the captain for the Bangkok event. But, then the Federation changed their decision and goalkeeper Shahidur Rahman Shantoo from MSC was appointed the new captain. 7 Abahani players including Nannu withdrew from the team in protest. The much depleted Bangladesh team struggled in the tournament losing 1–0 to Malaysia and 3–0 to India. Following this incident, the federation generally tried to pick national team captain outside the big two Dhaka teams for the next few years.

The 1980s was the golden era of club football in Dhaka. Any match involving Mohammedan or Abahani would draw huge crowd at the Dhaka stadium. The rivalry between the two rivals was at its peak in this era. Before the match flags of Abahani and Mohamedan were observed in rooftops of Dhaka residents. Abahani won a hat-trick of titles in 1983, 1984 & 1985 and Mohammedan made a record of winning an unbeaten hat-trick of titles in 1986, 1987 & 1988-89. The rivalry reached its peak as fans always wanted their favorite team to win and they also contested in foreign tournaments and were the best sides.

=== 2000s–2010 ===
Since the start of the Bangladesh Premier League in 2007, the rivalry has lost majority of its past fame.

== Head-to-head ==
=== Statistics ===
Following statistics are from matches since 2007 B.League.

Competition	Abahani wins	Draws	Mohammedan wins	Abahani goals	Mohammedan goals
League	14	12	5	40	24
Federation Cup	1	1	1	8	6
Total	15	13	6	48	30

=== Matches ===
Following is the list of matches since 2007 B.League.

#	Season	Date	Competition	Stadium	Home Team	Result	Away Team	Report
1	2007	16 March 2007	Bangladesh Premier League	Bangabandhu National Stadium	Mohammedan	0–1	Abahani	
2	2007	16 June 2007	Bangladesh Premier League	Kamalpur Stadium	Abahani	0–0	Mohammedan	
3	2008–09	1 September 2008	Federation Cup	Bangabandhu National Stadium	Abahani	1–1	Mohammedan	
4	2008–09	24 November 2008	Bangladesh Premier League	Kamalpur Stadium	Abahani	2–2	Mohammedan	
5	2008–09	24 January 2009	Bangladesh Premier League	Bangabandhu National Stadium	Mohammedan	1–2	Abahani	
6	2009–10	19 March 2010	Bangladesh Premier League	Bangabandhu National Stadium	Mohammedan	0–0	Abahani	
7	2009–10	2 June 2010	Bangladesh Premier League	Kamalpur Stadium	Abahani	1–2	Mohammedan	
8	2010–11	13 March 2011	Bangladesh Premier League	Kamalpur Stadium	Abahani	1–0	Mohammedan	
9	2010–11	24 June 2011	Bangladesh Premier League	Bangabandhu National Stadium	Mohammedan	0–0	Abahani	
10	2012	17 February 2012	Bangladesh Premier League	Bangabandhu National Stadium	Abahani	1–1	Mohammedan	
11	2012	22 May 2012	Bangladesh Premier League	Bangabandhu National Stadium	Mohammedan	2–0	Abahani	
12	2012–13	28 December 2012	Bangladesh Premier League	Bangabandhu National Stadium	Abahani	2–0	Mohammedan	
13	2012–13	7 April 2013	Bangladesh Premier League	Bangabandhu National Stadium	Mohammedan	1–1	Abahani	
14	2013–14	19 January 2014	Bangladesh Premier League	Bangabandhu National Stadium	Mohammedan	0–1	Abahani	
15	2013–14	4 May 2014	Bangladesh Premier League	Bangabandhu National Stadium	Abahani	0–1	Mohammedan	
16	2013–14	30 June 2014	Bangladesh Premier League	Bangabandhu National Stadium	Mohammedan	1–1	Abahani	
17	2015	20 May 2015	Bangladesh Premier League	Bangabandhu National Stadium	Abahani	0–1	Mohammedan	
18	2015	16 August 2015	Bangladesh Premier League	Bangabandhu National Stadium	Mohammedan	0–0	Abahani	
19	2016	21 September 2016	Bangladesh Premier League	Bangabandhu National Stadium	Mohammedan	0–3	Abahani	
20	2016	6 December 2016	Bangladesh Premier League	Gopalganj Stadium	Abahani	2–1	Mohammedan	
21	2017–18	7 August 2017	Bangladesh Premier League	Bangabandhu National Stadium	Abahani	1–0	Mohammedan	
22	2017–18	22 November 2017	Bangladesh Premier League	Bangabandhu National Stadium	Mohammedan	0–2	Abahani	
23	2018–19	28 February 2019	Bangladesh Premier League	Bangabandhu National Stadium	Abahani	3–0	Mohammedan	
24	2018–19	16 July 2019	Bangladesh Premier League	Bangabandhu National Stadium	Mohammedan	4–0	Abahani	
25	2020	4 March 2020	Bangladesh Premier League	Bangabandhu National Stadium	Abahani	4–0	Mohammedan	
26	2020	25 June 2020	Bangladesh Premier League	Bangabandhu National Stadium	Mohammedan	N/A (Note: League was suspended due to COVID-19 pandemic.)	Abahani	
27	2020–21	4 March 2020	Federation Cup	Bangabandhu National Stadium	Abahani	3–0	Mohammedan	
28	2020–21	28 January 2021	Bangladesh Premier League	Comilla Stadium	Mohammedan	2–2	Abahani	
29	2020–21	27 June 2021	Bangladesh Premier League	Bangabandhu National Stadium	Abahani	1–1	Mohammedan	
30	2021–22	23 February 2022	Bangladesh Premier League	Sylhet Stadium	Abahani	1–0	Mohammedan	
31	2021–22	22 June 2022	Bangladesh Premier League	Comilla Stadium	Mohammedan	2–4	Abahani	
32	2022–23	27 January 2023	Bangladesh Premier League	Comilla Stadium	Abahani	2–0	Mohammedan	
33	2022–23	26 May 2023	Bangladesh Premier League	Comilla Stadium	Mohammedan	1–1	Abahani	
34	2022–23	30 May 2023	Federation Cup	Comilla Stadium	Mohammedan	4–4 (Note: Mohammedan won 4–2 on penalty shoot-out.)	Abahani	
35	2023–24	13 February 2024	Federation Cup	Sheikh Fazlul Haque Mani Stadium	Abahani	1–2	Mohammedan	
36	2023–24	23 February 2024	Bangladesh Premier League	Comilla Stadium	Abahani	2–2	Mohammedan	
37	2023–24	29 May 2024	Bangladesh Premier League	Sheikh Fazlul Haque Mani Stadium	Abahani	1–2	Mohammedan	
38	2024–25	14 December 2024	Bangladesh Premier League	Comilla Stadium	Mohammedan	1–0	Abahani	
39	2024–25	7 January 2025	Federation Cup	Comilla Stadium	Mohammedan	0–1	Abahani	
40	2024–25	26 April 2025	Bangladesh Premier League	Comilla Stadium	Abahani	0–0	Mohammedan	
41	2025–26	24 November 2025	Bangladesh Football League	Comilla Stadium	Mohammedan	3–2	Abahani	
42	2025–26	10 April 2026	Bangladesh Football League	Comilla Stadium	Abahani	2–1	Mohammedan	

== Statistics ==
All players in bold are still active in the derby.

=== All-time top goalscorers ===
Nation	Player	Club(s)	League	Years
(Mali)	**Souleymane Diabate**	Dhaka Mohammedan	**11**	2018–2025
(Haiti)	Kervens Belfort	Dhaka Abahani	**4**	2018–2021
(Nigeria)	Emeka Christian Jbe	Dhaka Abahani	**3**	
(Costa Rica)	Daniel Colindres	Dhaka Abahani	**3**	2021–2023

=== Hat-tricks ===
Player	For	Against	Result	Date
(Mali) Souleymane Diabate	Dhaka Mohammedan	Dhaka Abahani	4–4 (H)	30 May 2023

== Records ==
Friendly matches are not included in the following records unless otherwise noted.

- Widest winning margin: **4 goals**
  - Mohammedan 4–0 Abahani (16 July 2019, 2018–19 Bangladesh Premier League)
  - Abahani 4–0 Mohammedan (4 March 2020, 2019–20 Bangladesh Premier League)
- Highest scoring match: **8 goals**
  - Mohammedan 4–4 Abahani (30 May 2022, 2022–23 Federation Cup)

== Notable matches ==
- **Abahani 2–0 Mohammedan** (1973)

This was the first ever Dhaka derby played in Dhaka First Division League. Amalesh Sen and Salahuddin scored the first and second goals for Abahani, defeating Mohammedan 2–0.

- **Abahani 1–1 Mohammedan** (1982)

In 1982, the Dhaka Derby between Abahani and Mohammedan ended in a 1–1 draw, becoming an infamous match, causing a riot.

- **Mohammedan 4–3 Abahani** (2000)

In a dramatic league clash, Mohammedan were trailing by two goals before Imtiaz Ahmed Nakib pulled off a stunning hat-trick to lead a remarkable comeback, sealing a 4–3 win. The game ended with Motiur Rahman Munna scoring in the dying moments, cementing its place as one of the most thrilling derbies ever. Nakib’s performance remains iconic in derby folklore.

- **Abahani 0–0 Mohammedan** (16 June 2007)

This was the first ever derby match in the Bangladesh Premier League. The match took place in Bangabandhu National Stadium in Dhaka on 16 June 2007, which ended in a 0–0 draw.

- **Mohammedan 1–0 Abahani** (27 March 2009)

The final match of Bangladesh Super Cup first edition. After the BDR uprising in February 2008, security was tight for the final held in March. Yet there was no shortage of interest among the audience. For the final match, more spectators stayed outside the stadium than on the field. A 21st minute goal by Nigerian midfielder John Godwin gave Mohammedan the Citycell Super Cup title with a solitary goal victory.

- **Abahani 4–0 Mohammedan** (4 March 2025)

In a mirror to the previous derby, Abahani answered back the following season with a commanding 4–0 win over Mohammedan.

- **Mohammedan 4–4 Abahani** (30 May 2023)

This was the final of 2022–23 Federation Cup, it ended 3–3 in the normal time, Diabate scored hat-trick for Mohammedan while Fahim, Colindres and Ogbugh scored for Abahani respectively. In additional time, Diabate scored his 4th goal in the 105th minute to give Mohammedan the lead. Mia scored in 118th minute equalizer to take the match into penalty shoot-out, where Mohammedan won 4–2 after Augusto and Colindres failed to convert their spot-kicks after Emon failed to score his penalty for Mohammedan.

== Players who played for both clubs ==
=== General information ===
Player	Abahani	Mohammedan
Ashish Bhadra	1981–1984, 1985–1990	1984
Mohammad Aslam	1984–1991, 1991–1992, 1994–1996	1983, 1993
Samrat Emily	1983–1985	1986–1992
Satyajit Das	1987–1991	1995
Ariful Kabir Farhad	1995–1996, 2005–2006	2003–2004, 2007
Alfaz Ahmed	2010–2011	2005–2006
Souleymane Diabate	2018–2025	2025–present

== General information ==
	Dhaka Abahani	Mohammedan SC
**First established name**	**Abahani Krira Chakra**	**Mohammedan Sporting Club Limited Dhaka**
**Founding year**	**1972**	**1936**
**Stadiums**	**Bangabandhu National Stadium**, Sylhet District Stadium, **Rafiq Uddin Bhuiyan Stadium**, **Comilla Stadium**	**Bangabandhu National Stadium**, **Sheikh Fazlul Haque Mani Stadium**, **Comilla Stadium**
**Capacity**	**36,000**, 15,000, **15,000**, **18,000**	**36,000**, **5,000**, **18,000**
**Number of seasons in Bangladesh Football League**	**15** (never been relegated)	**15** (never been relegated)
