= Abahani Limited Dhaka =

Association football club in Bangladesh

- Full name: Abahani Limited Dhaka
- Nickname: The Sky Blue Brigade
- Short name: ALD
- Founded: 1972; 54 years ago (as Abahani Krira Chakra)
- Ground: Shaheed Dhirendranath Datta Stadium
- Capacity: 18,000
- Head coach: Maruful Haque
- League: Bangladesh Football League
- 2025–26: Bangladesh Football League, 2nd of 10
Home colours	Away colours

Abahani Limited Dhaka (Bengali: আবাহনী লিমিটেড ঢাকা), also referred to as Dhaka Abahani or Abahani Limited, is a Bangladeshi professional football club based in the Dhanmondi area of Dhaka, Bangladesh. The club currently competes in the Bangladesh Football League, the top flight of Bangladeshi football.

The club was founded as Abahani Krira Chakra (Bengali: আবাহনী ক্রীড়া চক্র), through the re-organisation of Iqbal Sporting Club in 1972 by Sheikh Kamal, the eldest son of the first president of Bangladesh, Sheikh Mujibur Rahman. The club was converted into a Limited company in 1989. Abahani Limited Dhaka is regarded as one of the country's most renowned and well supported clubs. Since emerging on the domestic football scene, the club has formed an enduring rivalry with the neighbouring Dhaka Mohammedan, known as the Dhaka Derby.

Considered as one of the most decorated football clubs in Bangladesh. The club has won eleven Dhaka League titles, which was the highest tier in Bangladesh until 2006. Since the inception of the country's first professional league, they have achieved a record 6 Bangladesh Football League titles. With 17 domestic league titles, they are the second most successful club in Bangladesh top-tier league history, with the first being rivals Dhaka Mohammedan SC. The club has won both Federation Cup (12 times) and the Independence Cup (2 times) trophies. They have also enjoyed success in both continental and subcontinental football, winning 3 trophies (Charms Cup, Bordoloi Trophy and Sait Nagjee Trophy) from India, while in 2019, Abahani became the first Bangladeshi club to reach the knockout stages of the AFC Cup.

== History ==
=== Iqbal Sporting Club (1964–1971) ===
In 1964, after going through many legal implications, former Youth and Sports Secretary of Bangladesh Awami League, Harunur Rashid got hold of the Dhanmondi field in Road No. 19, which was owned by CNB (now known as PWD) back in East Pakistan. However, as an institution was needed to complete the transaction, in May 1966, Rashid established Abahani Samaj Kalyan Samiti, a social welfare association involved with sports, literature and culture. In 1968, Sheikh Mujibur Rahman's eldest son, Sheikh Kamal, got involved with Abahani following his father's request. After the 1971 Bangladesh Liberation War subsided, Kamal decided to create a new club in the newly liberated nation, then he learned of Iqbal Sporting Club, located in Mohammadpur, the Biharis who played at the club, had fled during the war. The club had already won the second-tier league before the war set about, however, they stopped all club activities the proceeding year due to the state of disarray the country was in. Kamal and co, reformed the club after being granted legal permission, and decided to use the club for Abahani's sports cycle. The reformed club appointed Nazmul Haque as their first president, while Harunur Rashid and Mohammad Farooq served as the main secretary and football secretary, respectively.

=== Early years (1972–1979) ===

Abahani's starting line-up against Bangladesh JIC during their inaugural First Division match in 1972. Abahani was shaped in a 3–3–4 formation by coach Kabir.

Having been crowned the Second Division title in 1970 as Iqbal Sporting Club, they were granted a place in the 1972 First Division, reformed as Abahani Krira Chakra. Before the 1972 season got underway, Abahani had already made a name for themselves by attaining the service of the country's first "megastar" footballer, Kazi Salahuddin from Mohammedan SC. Abahani's first league squad consisted of: Abul Kashem, Muslim, Zubair, Abdus Sadek (captain), Sheikh Jamaluddin, Hashemuddin, Farooq, Jahangir Shah Badsha, Mozammel Quader, Kazi Anwar, Mohsin, QM Rafique Dipu, Ranjit Kumar Saha, Gafur Bhuiyan, Sheikh Farid, Kazi Abu Siddique, Golam Sarwar Tipu, Kazi Salahuddin, Amalesh Sen, Mohammad Hossain, Abdul Quader, Masood Hasan, Sheikh Ashraf Ali, Belal Hossain, Ali Imam (vice-captain) and coach Kabir. Abahani played their first-ever top-tier league match on 11 June 1972, the opening day of the league, against the defending champions, Bangladesh JIC (BJIC), and earned a 0–0 draw. However, the league was abandoned midway, with the winners being unannounced. Abahani finished their first full season as the 1973 First Division runners-up, behind Bangladesh JIC. The team displayed their best performance in a 2–0 victory over giants Mohammedan, with goals from Amalesh Sen and Kazi Salahuddin; the latter scored 24 league goals that year.

Abahani won their first league title in 1974, under the guidance of Irish coach William Bill Hart, Abahani introduced Total Football to the Dhaka football scene. However, the club went through a dark period the subsequent year, following the assassination of Sheikh Mujibur Rahman, which also claimed the life of founding member Sheikh Kamal. Due to the political situation in the country, Abahani's future was left uncertain, and it was on the path of disbanding only to be saved by some officials and players. Amidst the chaos, Abahani lost the league title to Mohammedan, starting off the fierce rivalry between the two clubs, which was later branded as the Dhaka Derby. Kazi Salahuddin moved to the Hong Kong League following the season's conclusion, largely due to Sheikh Kamal's murder. The late 70s was a rebuilding era for Abahani, players like Monwar Hossain Nannu, Golam Rabbani Helal, Ashrafuddin Ahmed Chunnu and Amalesh Sen were a major part of the club's return to glory. Although the club did not enjoy much success at the Aga Khan Gold Cup, they were able to break Mohammedan's league dominance by regaining the First Division title in 1977, after defeating Rahmatganj MFS 3–1 in the league-deciding game, with goals coming from Kazi Salahuddin, Khurshid Alam Babul and Kazi Anwar. The return of Kazi Salahuddin to full fitness was a major boost as he scored 14 goals during their unbeaten 1977 league triumph and again in 1978, helping Abahani retain the title.

=== Revolutionary Era (1980–1991) ===
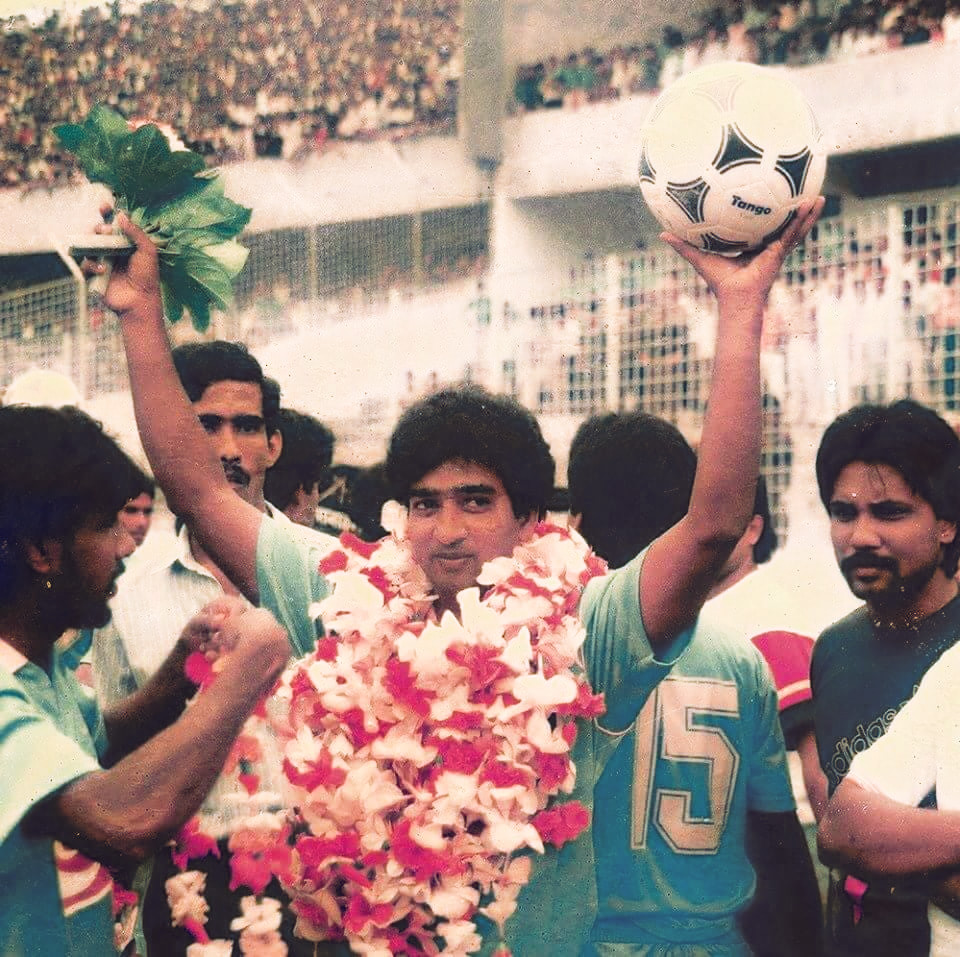
Ashrafuddin Ahmed Chunnu was a vital player for the club from 1975 to 1988.

The 1980s saw Abahani and Mohammedan dominate the First Division and their rivalry reach its peak. In the 70s the club did not have an established fan base, but over the following years the "Sky Blue Brigade" was established, rivalling the millions of Mohammedan supporters in the country. Although Mohammedan SC were crowned the first league winners of the new decade, Abahani responded with the signings of Sri Lankan defender Pakir Ali and Rahmatganj MFS midfield maestro Ashish Bhadra. The Ashish–Babul combination in the midfield served both the club and the country with great distinction, as Abahani won the league in 1981, and were joint champions of the Federation Cup alongside Mohammedan. In September 1982, Abahani star players Kazi Salahuddin, Ashrafuddin Ahmed Chunnu, Golam Rabbani Helal and Kazi Anwar were summarily tried by the military court and sentenced to various terms of imprisonment for the disturbance caused by violently protesting a referee's decision in the Abahani-Mohammedan duel. It was written in the indictment against them that they had initiated a conspiracy to overthrow the military government at the time. The four footballers were later released on the orders of Chief Martial Law Administrator General Hussain Muhammad Ershad after agitated fans of both Mohammedan and Abahani protested throughout the country; the event was named the "Black September" of Bangladeshi football.

In 1983, Abahani added Samrat Hossain Emily from Wari Club to assist the ageing Kazi Salahuddin. Abahani secured the league title following a 2–0 victory over Brothers Union in the Super League, with goals from Abdul Gaffar and Salahuddin. 1984 was a noteworthy year in Dhaka football as the Dhaka Metropolitan Football Committee introduced the 3-point system in the league, and at the time only the English leagues were using this system. However, while in search of hat trick league titles, club legend Kazi Salahuddin announced his surprise retirement after securing a consecutive league title that year. 1985 saw confusion inside the Abahani camp after Salahuddin, who had retired the previous year, was made the head coach, replacing Ali Imam, who had just won them successive league titles. Ali Imam took charge of Brothers Union, determined to take revenge. Nonetheless, Abahani beat favourites Brothers Union to the title, as even after finishing behind Brothers during the normal league stage, Abahani were unbeaten in the Super League, thus completing their domestic league hat trick. A year before Salahuddin had retired, Abahani brought in striker Sheikh Mohammad Aslam from Mohammedan, Aslam went on to terrorise the Dhaka field, being named the league's top goal scorer for 4 consecutive years (1984 to 1987), scoring 17 goals during Abahani's hat trick winning season, and also helped the club win their second Federation Cup in 1985. Due to their 1984 league triumph, Abahani participated in the 1985–86 Asian Club Championship, becoming the first Bangladeshi club to achieve the feat. They defeated the Sri Lankan team Saunders SC and Club Valencia from Maldives, 4–1 and 8–1 respectively, however they finished Central Asian Zone runners-up as they lost to India's East Bengal Club 1–0.

In 1986, Sheikh Mohammad Aslam's 20 league goals weren't enough to stop Mohammedan SC, guided by Iranian goalkeeper Nasser Hejazi, who played in the 1978 World Cup, putting an end to Abahani's title-winning run, the club did manage a consolation, winning the 1986 Federation Cup trophy. The 1987 First Division League was one of the most highly competitive seasons in Dhaka football. Abahani made marquee signings of their own by bringing in Iraqi duo Samir Shaker and Karim Allawi, both of whom played in the 1986 World Cup, and also completed the transfer of 19-year-old teenage sensation Monem Munna. Abahani managed to retain the Federation Cup, but lost out on the league title to Mohammedan once again. Going into the last game of the season against Mohammedan, Abahani only needed a point to secure the title, however, among all the star players present, it was veteran midfielder and longtime Abahani servant Khurshid Alam Babul who won the game for Mohammedan, scoring the winning goal as the game ended 3–2. With the two teams tied at the top with equal points, a play-off match was required. On 9 September 2022, three days after the previous encounter, the title-deciding game between Abahani and Mohammedan got underway, and after repeated police intervention, the high-voltage match, which saw two players sent off after a scuffle, ended 0–0. After the game, players from both teams agreed to be crowned joint champions, fearing fan conflict after an intense game. However, the BFF did not accept the agreement and decided to hold a 2nd play-off match. Both captains, Aslam and Ranjit Saha (Mohammedan SC), were given a 1-year ban, while Abahani's two key players, Moshin and Mostafa Kamal, were banned for three months. On 26 October, the clubs played the second play-off game behind closed doors, due to security concerns. Abahani lost the game 2–0.

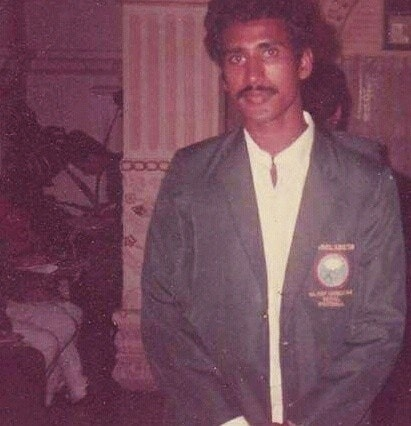
Sheikh Md. Aslam is second in the club's all-time top scorers chart with 119 league goals

In 1988, Abahani won the Federation Cup once again. Their Sri Lankan striker, Ratnayaka Premalal, was also lethal that year, scoring 18 league goals, but eventually failed to prevent Mohammedan SC from winning their hat trick league title. The subsequent year, long-serving club legends Ashrafuddin Ahmed Chunnu and Golam Rabbani Helal both announced their retirements, leading the club to put their faith into the young duo, Monem Munna and Rizvi Karim Rumi. During the 1989–90 season, Abahani finally broke their league drought, with Sheikh Aslam scoring 11 league goals, Rumi becoming the second highest goal scorer, and club captain Ashish Bhadra ending his career by lifting the league title one last time. They were also able to win India's historic Sait Nagjee Trophy in 1989. Under Yugoslavian head coach Marko Velich, they defeated previous year's winner Salgaocar FC, 1–0 in the final. Aslam was the lone scorer. By 1989, the club had transitioned into a limited company. In 1990, a brace from Rizvi Karim Rumi saw Abahani win their first Independence Cup, defeating Mohammedan 2–1. Abahani managed to defeat Indian giants East Bengal Club and rivals Mohammedan during their 1991 BTC Club Cup triumph. And as the country's domestic league was not held in 1991, East Bengal roped in Munna, Gaus, Rumi & Aslam from Abahani for the Calcutta Football League.

=== A period of uncertainty (1992–2006) ===
In the mid-nineties, many players started leaving Bangladesh's top three clubs, Mohammedan, Abahani, and Brothers Union, for Muktijoddha SKC, after the trio made a gentleman's agreement to lower player salaries. In late 1991, Monem Munna returned to Abahani from India, and the club officials paid him a record fee of 2 million taka, which made nationwide headlines, preventing his move to Muktijoddha SKC. Munna led a young Abahani team to the First Division title, beating a star-studded Muktijoddha side in the race. That year Abahani's new generation included Masoud Rana, Zakir Hossain and Mamun Joarder, the latter's brace against Mohammedan won Abahani the league in the season-ending game. A pivotal part of the team was their Russian midfielder Sergey Zhukov, who created an indestructible partnership with Zakir Hossain in midfield during the course of the season. Even after the club's league triumph, aside from Munna, the rest of the players got salaries around Tk 8 to 1.2 million. The discord in the team camp saw Abahani lose integral players each season. Among all the departures, Sheikh Aslam and Monem Munna remained loyal to the club, and carried on the team's legacy for the following few years by winning consecutive league titles from 1994 to 1995. In 1994, Abahani defeated Kolkata Mohammedan in the final of India's Charms Cup, with goals from Mamun Joarder and Zulfiker Mintu. The joy did not last long as Aslam, who had 119 goals for the club, hung up his boots in 1996, while Munna was forced to retire in 1997 due to kidney complicacy. The 1997–98 Asian Cup Winners' Cup, saw Abahani thrash Sri Lanka's Old Benedictines Club 8–0 on aggregate. Nevertheless, the team was knocked out in the second round by Beijing Guoan, from China.

Since 1995, Abahani failed had to win the league title for the next five years, which was the longest the club had been without a league title since inception. Abahani's rivalry with Mohammedan SC also lost its past popularity, this saw a major reduction in the club's fanbase in the following years. In 2000, alongside the inconsistent Dhaka Premier Division League, which replaced the First Division as top-tier in 1993, the BFF arranged the National League, where clubs from all over the country took part in. Monem Munna who was named Abahani's team manager following his retirement and ex-club captain turned coach Amalesh Sen, lead Abahani to winning both trophies in 2000, while also managing to retain the Premier Division title, in 2001. Munna also guided the club to hat trick Federation Cup titles from 1997 till 2000, alongside different coaches. Nonetheless, Munna health deteriorated the following few years, making him unable to play an active role in the club. On 9 June 2005, 38-year-old Monem Munna died due to kidney failure, while being technical advisor of the football committee. In 2007, the Premier Division was made the country's second-tier after 58 years of existence as the top-tier, and although Abahani were crowned league champions 11 previous times, they failed win the league during its final three years, falling behind Mohammedan and Brothers Union.

=== Bangladesh Football League era (2007–present) ===
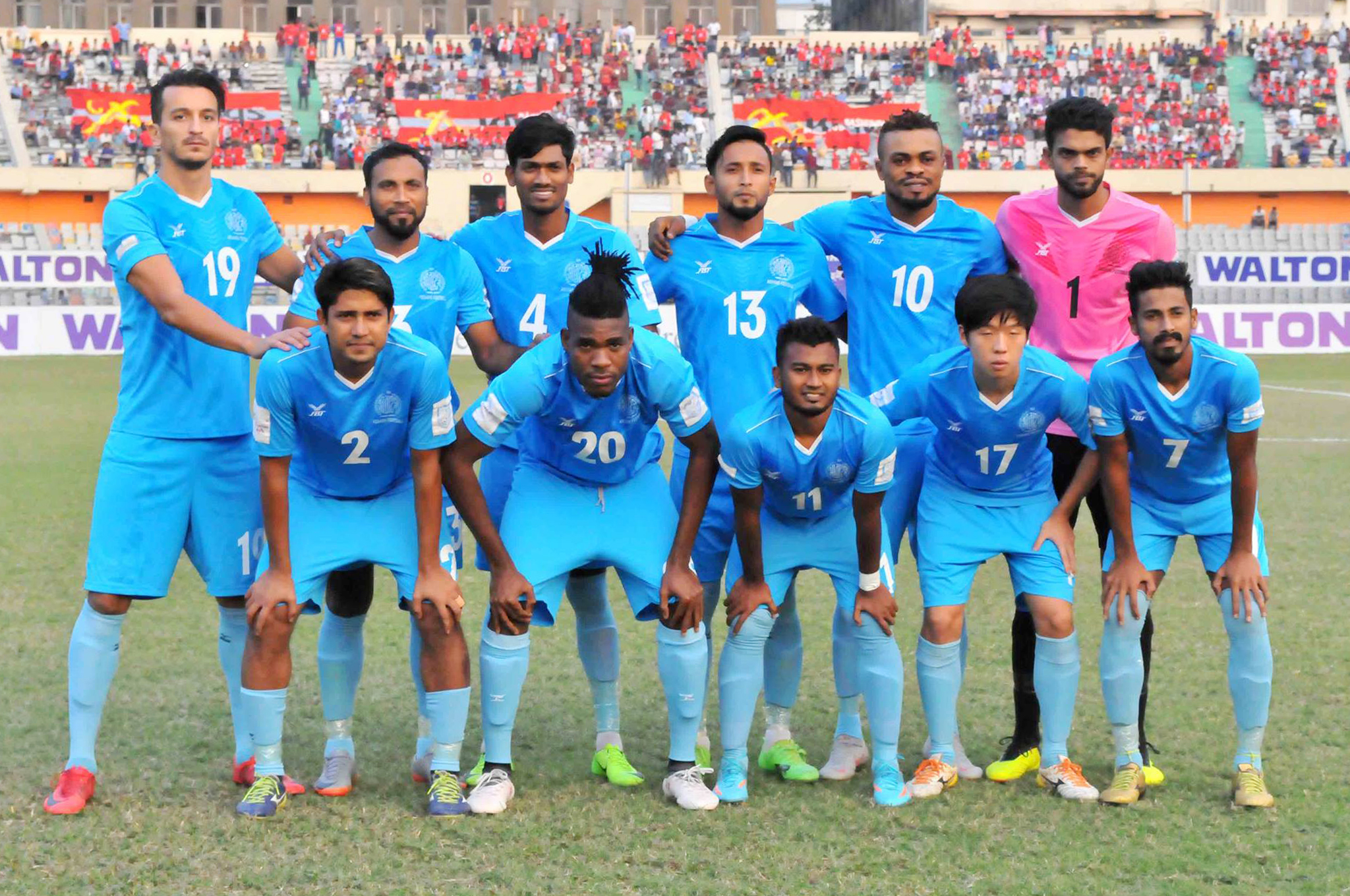
Abahani's starting XI at the 2018 Bangladesh Federation Cup final

In 2007, the Bangladesh Football Federation introduced the B.League as the country's first-ever professional football league. To end their league title drought, Abahani appointed Argentine Andrés Cruciani, who brought in Argentine trio Mariano Caporale, Mariano Sanchez and Hector Parodi. However, Cruciani departed midway through the season, and it was the local striker Zahid Hasan Ameli who led Abahani to the title by scoring 12 league goals under club legends Satyajit Das Rupu and Amalesh Sen, who served as the team manager and head coach, respectively. The same coaching staff managed to stir Abahani to consecutive league titles the following year. After securing the 2010 Federation Cup trophy, Amalesh Sen's Abahani side became the first club to win hat trick B.League titles with their 2009–10 Bangladesh League triumph, and striker Enamul Haque also became the first local golden boot winner in B.League history. The following season, Dhanmondi Club, which was renamed Sheikh Jamal Dhanmondi Club, became the first club aside from Abahani to win the professional league.

Abahani's starting line-up against April 25 SC during the first leg of the 2019 AFC Cup Inter-zone play-off semi-finals.

On 6 August 2011, Abahani won the Bangladesh Super Cup by defeating arch-rivals Mohammedan in the final. They also managed to win the 2011–12 BPL, nonetheless Abahnai's record in continental competitions remained dismal, failing to advance past the group stages of the AFC President's Cup after five attempts. The following three years, Abahani was not able to win a single trophy amidst the constant change of coaches, leading to Abahani supporters physically attacking players during games. In 2016, György Kottán's Abahani responded to their frustrated fans by winning the 2015–16 BPL, becoming the first club to win the Premier League with an unbeaten record. Abahani began their 2017–18 season by equalling Mohammedan's record of 10 Federation Cup trophies. On 5 January 2018, Abahani emerged as Bangladesh Football League champions for the record sixth time after they edged Sheikh Jamal DC 2–0 to confirm their second straight title with a game in hand. The club dedicated the title to their lifelong coach and former player Amalesh Sen, who died in October 2017. During the 2017–18 season, Abahani again managed to win the domestic double.

On 26 June 2019, Masih Saighani's stoppage time winner against Minerva Punjab during the final game of the 2019 AFC Cup group stage saw Abahani make history by becoming the first Bangladeshi club to reach the Inter-zone play-off semi-finals of the AFC Cup. Abahani faced the North Korean side April 25 SC and managed to produce one of their finest performances since inception by defeating the North Korean giants 4–3 in the first leg, which was held at the Bangabandhu National Stadium in Dhaka. Sohel Rana and Nabib Newaj Jibon scored once apiece while Nigerian striker Sunday Chizoba netted a brace. Nonetheless, Abahani were not able to repeat their past heroics during the away leg at the Kim Il-sung Stadium in Pyongyang, losing the game 2–0 (5–4 aggregate).

== Club culture ==
=== Crest and colours ===
Abahani (Bengali: আবাহনী), means incoming message, sound or music, and thus, one of the club's founding members, Harunur Rashid, designed the club's crest after being influenced by the flag of the United Nations. Similar to the United Nations flag, Abahani's crest has flowers on both sides. Regarding the design, Rahid said "The flag of the United Nations is blue, we take that color from there and to make it bloom better, I wrote Abahani below with yellow paint."

=== Sponsorship ===
Year	Kit manufacturer	Main sponsor
1991–1992	N/A	Milo
1993–1994	N/A	Nissan
2005–2008	FBT	Mutual Trust Bank Limited
2013–14	Kika Sports	N/A
2014–15	Pegan Sport	N/A
2015–16	Grand Sport Group	N/A
2016–2017	Sports & Sportz Design	N/A
2017–2020	FBT	N/A
2020–present	Graphics Bird	N/A

=== Supporters ===
During the early 70s, Abahani did not have an established fanbase, while the top sides, such as BJMC, Moahmmedan and Wanderers who had supporters all across the country, despised newcomers Abahani for taking their players, due to Sheikh Kamal and Harunur Rashid's strong influence. During the mid-1970s, Abahani players were constantly targeted by rival supporters and football authorities because of political disputes, even more so after Sheikh Kamal's assassination in 1975. After winning the 1977 edition of the First Division League with an unbeaten record, Abahani finally was able to get some recognition, forming a fanbase of their own. Since the start of the 80s, their supporters expanded throughout the country and were notorious for their violent altercations with Mohammedan SC supporters. Alongside the club, the supporters are also called the "Sky Blue Brigade". Throughout the 80s, many Abahani supporters were killed or heavily injured due to their constant riots during games. The supporters are well known for attacking their own players, most recently, in 2014, Mofazzal Hossain Shaikat, Shahidul Alam Sohel and Shaikat Bhowmik were reportedly injured by angry Abahani supporters after being defeated by Mohammedan SC in the semi-finals of the Independence Cup. Abahani became one of the first Bangladeshi clubs to interact with fans through social media platforms.

== Rivalries ==
=== Dhaka Derby ===
The Dhaka Derby is a football match between Abahani Limited Dhaka and Mohammedan SC.

As of 22 June 2022, 133 matches have been played between the two teams, out of which Abahani Limited Dhaka has won 56 matches and Mohammedan SC has won 41 times (including all competitive matches and exhibition games), while the other 23 matches ended in draws, from which 3 matches were abandoned.

The two clubs first met during the 1973 Dhaka Football League. Abahani defeated favourites Mohammedan 2–0, causing an upset. Amalesh Sen and Kazi Salahuddin scored the goals. In the return game during the league, with Mohammedan SC leading 1–0, a fight broke out between fans and players, and the match was called off with Abahani withdrawing.

In September 1982, during the "Black September" event, when four Abahani players were arrested after a Dhaka Derby match, the arrestees later accused former Mohammedan SC striker and at the time the vice-president of the Bangladesh Football Federation, Hafizuddin Ahmed, of planning the whole incident beforehand to defame the club. The early years saw many violent confrontations between fans of both clubs, usually leading to police intervention or matches to be played behind closed doors, such as in 1987 when Mohammedan SC secured the league title.

Some of Abahani's notable wins include the 1986 Federation Cup match, when Sri Lankan striker Ratnayaka Premalal scored the first-ever hat trick in a Dhaka Derby. While during the 1990 Independence Cup final, striker Rizvi Karim Rumi scored a brace against Mohammedan SC in a 2–1 win. Mamun Joarder scored twice against Mohammedan SC in the league-deciding game in 1992 to win Abahani their eighth league title.

== Club facilities ==
Ever since Harunur Rashid acquired the Dhanmondi field (now known as the Abahani Limited field) in 1966, it has been used as the main training ground for the club. The field is located on Road No. 19, and also has a basketball court and cricket ground connected to the club tent, all of which is owned by the limited company.

=== Stadiums ===
==== Locations ====
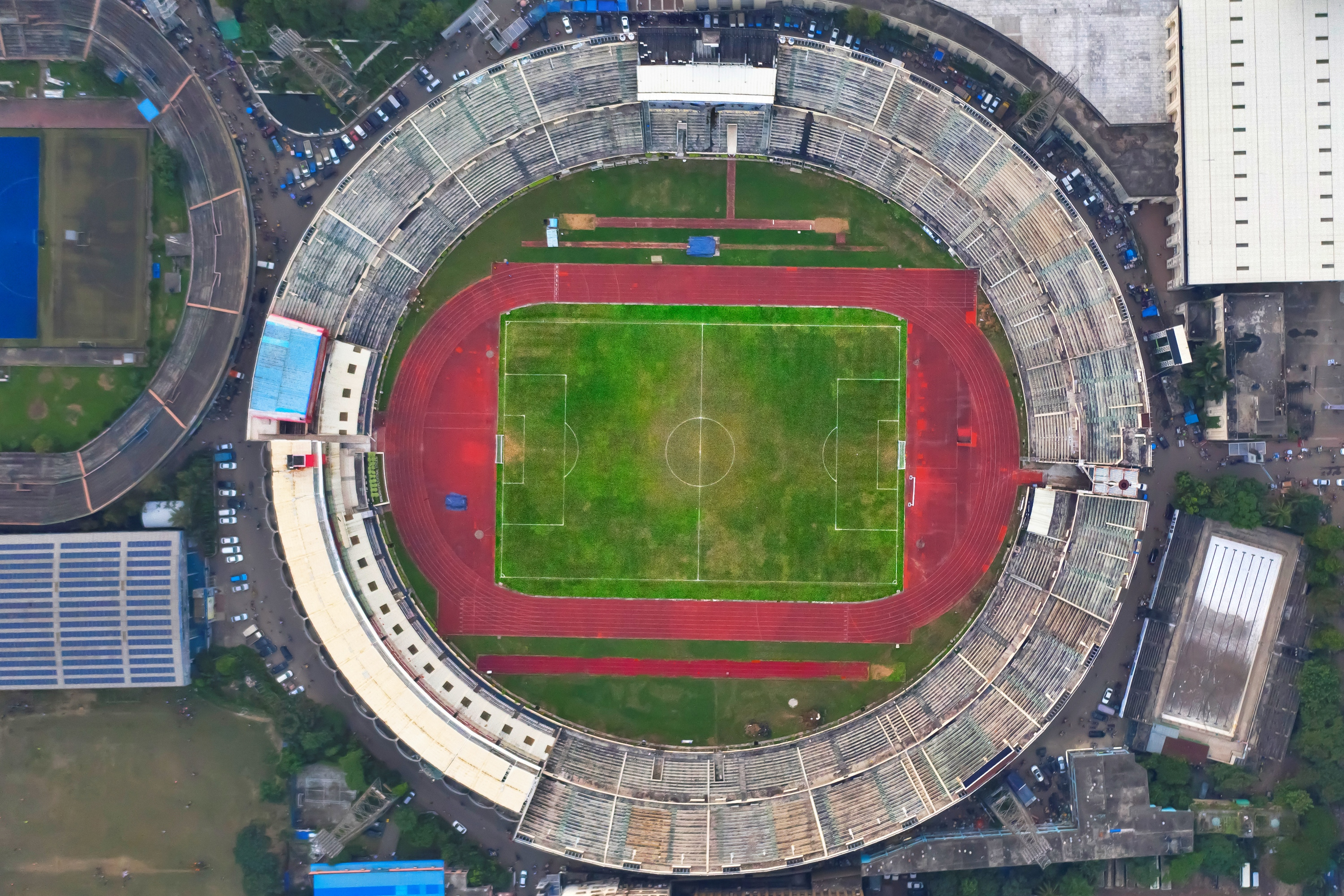
Bangabandhu National Stadium, is where the club has played most of its matches since inception.

Coordinates	Location	Stadium	Capacity	Year
23°43′40.2″N 90°24′48.4″E	Motijheel, Dhaka	Bangabandhu National Stadium	36,000	1972–present
24°53′53.46″N 91°51′48.96″E	Sylhet	Sylhet District Stadium	15,000	2022
23°27′51.82″N 91°10′52.89″E	Comilla	Shaheed Dhirendranath Datta Stadium	18,000	2023
23°00′15.20″N 89°49′38.57″E	Gopalganj	Sheikh Fazlul Haque Mani Stadium	5,000	2024–present

While home matches have predominantly been played at the 36,000 capacity Bangabandhu National Stadium, the domestic league regularly took place at a single venue. The stadium also hosted the group stage and knockout stage fixtures for Abahani during the 2019 AFC Cup. The country's national stadium was the main venue for the First Division League, ever since its inception during the East Pakistan era. During the entirety of the '70s and '80s, when local football's popularity was at its peak, the Dhaka Derby attracted thousands of fans into the stadium from all over the country, and has numerous records of brawls breaking out among the fans.

Since 2022, the 15,000 capacity Sylhet District Stadium has been used as Abahani's home venue. The club shares the stadium with Rahmatganj MFS during the league campaign. Before the 2018 Bangabandhu Cup, the stadium went through a half-month-long renovation, with new colours on the gallery and a digital score board. The Sylhet stadium also regularly hosts international matches, for both the men's and women's senior national teams.

=== Sheikh Kamal sports complex ===
In 2011, the club desired to build its own sports complex, commemorating one of its finding members Sheikh Kamal the authorities decided that the Sheikh Kamal Sports Complex would be the new home of the Limited company. However, the construction process started from late 2022, when Abahani celebrated its 50th anniversary. A modern sports complex will be built in the rest of the football and cricket practice fields. The football stadium is rumoured to have a capacity around 15,000, while it would also have its own media box and dressing room for both home and away teams.

== Current squad ==
As of 6 September 2026

Note: Flags indicate national team as defined under FIFA eligibility rules; some limited exceptions apply. Players may hold more than one non-FIFA nationality.

No.	Pos.	Nation	Player
1	GK	BAN	Mahfuz Hasan Pritom
2	DF	BAN	Hasan Murad Tipu
3	DF	BAN	Assaduzzaman Bablu (captain)
4	DF	BAN	Yeasin Khan (vice-captain)
5	DF	BAN	Sabuz Hossain
6	MF	BAN	Papon Singh
7	FW	BAN	Mirajul Islam
8	DF	BAN	Shakil Hossain
9	FW	BAN	Al-Amin
10	MF	BAN	Shekh Morsalin
11	FW	NGR	Chinedu Matthew
12	FW	NGR	Michael Babatunde
13	DF	BAN	Kamrul Islam
14	DF	BAN	Abdullah Omar Sajib
15	MF	BAN	Rabiul Hasan
16	MF	BAN	Iftiar Hossain

No.	Pos.	Nation	Player
17	MF	BAN	Asadul Molla
18	MF	BAN	Nazmul Huda Faysal
19	MF	BAN	Emtiyaz Raihan
20	FW	BAN	Md Amir Ali
21	FW	BAN	Md Hedayet Ullah
22	GK	BAN	Md Shamim Hossen
23	DF	BAN	Md Abdul Riyad Fahim
24	DF	BAN	Yeasin Arafat
25	DF	BAN	Masud Rana
27	FW	BAN	Md Ruhul Amin Akash
28	FW	BAN	Md Sirajul Islam Sakib
30	GK	BAN	Mitul Marma
31	GK	BAN	Raj Chowdhury
12	DF	NGR	Sunday Afolabi
77	MF	PAK	Moin Ahmed
99	FW	NGR	Anthony Okachi

== Personnel ==
=== Current technical staff ===
As of 28 November 2025

Position	Name
Head coach	(Bangladesh) Maruful Haque
Manager	(Bangladesh) Ali Yaqub
Assistant coach	(Bangladesh) Pranotosh Kumar Das
Assistant coach	(Bangladesh) Mamun Miah
Assistant coach	(Bangladesh) Kazi Nazrul Islam
Assistant coach	(Bangladesh) Manosh Chandra Das
Team official	(Bangladesh) Manosh Chandra Das
Goalkeeping coach	(Bangladesh) Atiqur Rahman Atique
Physiotherapist	(Bangladesh) Md Shahadath Hossain
Club official	(Bangladesh) Babul Nandy
Equipment manager	(Bangladesh) Md Kayom
Masseur	(Bangladesh) Nihal Sheikh

=== Board of directors ===
As of October 2023

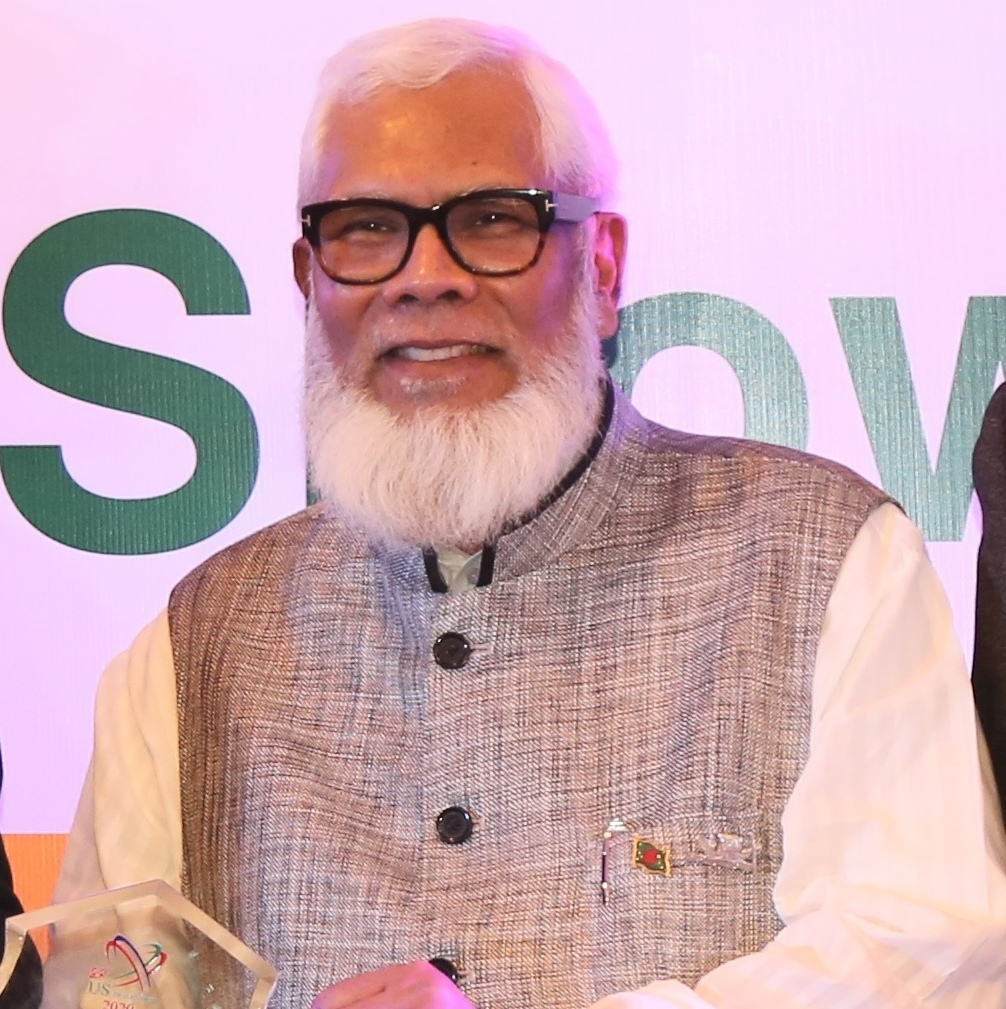
Salman Fazlur Rahman, a businessman who played an integral part in forming the club as a limited company, currently serves as the club's chairman.

Position	Name
Chairman	(Bangladesh) Salman F Rahman
Head of delegation	(Bangladesh) Harunur Rashid
Football chairman	(Bangladesh) Kazi Nabil Ahmed
Board of directors	(Bangladesh) Saber Hossain Chowdhury
Board of directors	(Bangladesh) Momenuddin Ahmed
Board of directors	(Bangladesh) Tanvir Mazharul Islam Tanna
Board of directors	(Bangladesh) AHM Mustafa Kamal
Board of directors	(Bangladesh) Anjan Chowdhury
Board of directors	(Bangladesh) Sheikh Helal Uddin
Board of directors	(Bangladesh) Md Nur Ali
Board of directors	(Bangladesh) Kazi Anis Ahmed
Board of directors	(Bangladesh) Kazi Inam Ahmed
Board of directors	(Bangladesh) Ahmed Shahriar Rahman
Board of directors	(Bangladesh) Azmal Kabir
Board of directors	(Bangladesh) Shayan F Rahman
Board of directors	(Bangladesh) Sheikh Bashir Al Mamun
Board of directors	(Bangladesh) Shahriar Alam

== Coaching records ==
=== Managerial history ===
- (Bangladesh) Kabir Ahmed (1972–1973)
- (Republic of Ireland) William Bill Hart (1974–1975)
- (Scotland) Paul Cummings (1978)
- (Bangladesh) Abdus Sadeque (1975–1979)
- (Republic of Ireland) William Bill Hart (1979–1980)
- (Bangladesh) Abdur Rahim (1981–1982)
- (Bulgaria) Noam Swab (1983)
- (Bangladesh) Ali Imam (1983–1984)
- (Bangladesh) Kazi Salahuddin (1985–1987)
- (Bangladesh) Ashraf Uddin Ahmed Chunnu (1988)
- (Lithuania) Algimantas Liubinskas (1988–1989)
- (Socialist Federal Republic of Yugoslavia) Marko Velich (1989–1990)
- (Bangladesh) Abdul Gaffar (1991, acting)
- (Bangladesh) Kazi Salahuddin (1991–1994)
- (Iraq) Samir Shaker (1994)
- (Russia) Valery Bogdanov (1995–1996)
- (Bangladesh) Abdul Gaffar (1996)
- (Bangladesh) Abu Yusuf (1997)
- (Romania) Sernainu Constantine (1997–1998)
- (Sri Lanka) Pakir Ali (1999)
- (Bangladesh) Amalesh Sen (2000)
- (Ukraine) Yuri Susloparov (2001–2002)
- (Russia) Anatoly Olkhovic (2002–2003)
- (Bangladesh) Amalesh Sen (2004–2006)
- (Argentina) Andrés Cruciani (2007)
- (Bangladesh) Amalesh Sen (2007–2010)
- (Iran) Ali Akbar Pourmoslemi (2010–2012)
- (Iran) Ardeshir Pournemat Vodehi (2012–2013)
- (Australia) Nathan Hall (2013)
- (Bangladesh) Amalesh Sen (2013)
- (Iran) Ali Akbar Pourmoslemi (2013–2014)
- (Bangladesh) Amalesh Sen (2014)
- (Austria) György Kottán (2014–2015)
- (Bangladesh) Amalesh Sen (2015)
- (Croatia) Drago Mamić (2016)
- (Bangladesh) Amalesh Sen (2016)
- (Croatia) Drago Mamić (2017)
- (Bangladesh) Atiqur Rahman Atique (2017–2018)
- (Bangladesh) Saiful Bari Titu (2018)
- (Bangladesh) Jakaria Babu (2018)
- (Portugal) Mário Lemos (2018–2023)
- (Argentina) Andrés Cruciani (2023–2024)
- (Bangladesh) Maruful Haque (2024–)

=== Managerial statistics ===
As of 23 May 2026

Head coach/Manager	From	To	P	W	D	L	GS	GA	%W
(Argentina) Andrés Cruciani	February 2007	10 May 2007	9	5	3	1	10	2	55.56
(Austria) György Kottán	1 May 2016	31 December 2016	34	22	10	2	69	28	64.71
(Croatia) Drago Mamić	1 January 2017	29 November 2017	21	11	7	3	27	21	52.38
(Bangladesh) Atiqur Rahman Atique	1 December 2017	1 February 2018	11	9	1	1	18	6	81.82
(Bangladesh) Saiful Bari Titu	7 February 2018	16 May 2018	6	1	1	4	5	12	16.67
(Bangladesh) Jakaria Babu	17 October 2018	23 November 2018	5	4	0	1	11	6	80.00
(Portugal) Mário Lemos	2 December 2018	13 October 2023	136	90	23	23	328	157	66.18
(Argentina) Andrés Cruciani	13 October 2023	29 May 2024	28	15	6	7	54	33	53.57
(Bangladesh) Maruful Haque	17 September 2024	Present	47	28	11	8	86	30	59.57

‡– Interim P – Total of played matches W – Won matches D – Drawn matches L – Lost matches GS – Goal scored GA – Goals against
%W – Percentage of matches won

== Season by season record ==
=== Semi-professional league (1972–2006) ===
Record as Dhaka Football League member
Season	Division	League								Federation Cup	Independence Cup	Asian club competition		Top league scorer(s)	
Season	Division	P	W	D	L	GF	GA	Pts	Position	Federation Cup	Independence Cup	Asian club competition		Player	Goals
1972	First Division	Abandoned								—	—	—		N/A	
1973	First Division	28	18	5	5	53	22	41	3rd	—	—	—		(Bangladesh) Kazi Salahuddin	24
1974	First Division	20	13	6	1	38	12	27	Champions (Note: The Dhaka Metropolition Football Committee did not follow FIFA rules when they decided to name Abahani Limited Dhaka champions based on average goal scored instead of goal difference.)	—	—	—		(Bangladesh) Kazi Salahuddin	14
1975	First Division	30	17	7	6	71	25	41	3rd	—	Round 1	—		(Bangladesh) Kazi Salahuddin	18
1976	First Division	18 (Note: Does not include the semi-final after the Super League round against Brothers Union and the final against Mohammedan SC. Abahani won the semi-final 4–1 on penalties after a goalless draw and lost the final 2–0. No points were gained or lost during these two fixtures as they were held in a knockout format.)	7	7	4	30	17	21	Runners-up	—	—	—		N/A	
1977	First Division	?	?	?	?	?	?	?	Champions	—	—	—		(Bangladesh) Kazi Salahuddin	14
1978	First Division	24	12	9	3	29	17	33	3rd	—	—	—		N/A	
1979	First Division	23	15	6	2	46	15	36	Runners-up	—	—	—		(Bangladesh) Kazi Salahuddin	14
1980	First Division	22	9	6	7	27	12	24	4th	Semi-finals	—	—		(Bangladesh) Kazi Salahuddin	15
1981	First Division	24	18	5	1	39	7	41	Champions	Runners-up	—	—		(Bangladesh) Kazi Anwar Hossain	10
1982	First Division	23	14	5	4	34	12	33	Runners-up	Champions (Note: Abahani Limited Dhaka and Mohammedan SC where joint champions of the 1982 Federation Cup after the final ended 0–0.)	—	—		(Bangladesh) Kazi Salahuddin	8
1983	First Division	23	18	5	0	44	6	41	Champions	Runners-up	—	—		(Bangladesh) Samrat Hossain Emily (Bangladesh) Abdul Gaffar	11
1984	First Division	23	18	2	3	48	17	56 (Note: The Dhaka Metropolitan Football Committee deducted six points from Abahani after its players attacked referee Zahirul Haque during a first-phase match against Rahmatganj on 9 June 1984. The decision was later overturned on 23 June 1984 following protests by Abahani supporters.)	Champions	Abandoned (Note: The 1984 Federation Cup final between Abahani Limited Dhaka and Mohammedan SC was abandoned due to a riot started by fans of the respective clubs.)	—	—		(Bangladesh) Sheikh Mohammad Aslam	17
1985	First Division	22	15	6	1	42	13	51	Champions	Champions	—	—		(Bangladesh) Sheikh Mohammad Aslam	18
1986	First Division	22	18	2	2	49	8	56	Runners-up	Champions	—	Asian Club Championship	Qualifying Stage	(Bangladesh) Sheikh Mohammad Aslam	20
1987	First Division	?	?	?	?	?	?	?	Runners-up	Group-Stage	—	—		(Bangladesh) Sheikh Mohammad Aslam	14
1988/89	First Division	22	18	3	1	38	7	39	Runners-up	Champions	—	—		(Sri Lanka) Prem Lal	18
1989/90	First Division	17	13	4	0	35	5	30	Champions	Runners-up	Champions	—		(Bangladesh) Sheikh Mohammad Aslam	11
1991	First Division	Season cancelled													
1991/92	First Division	19	18	1	0	53	9	37	Champions	3rd	Runners-up	Asian Cup Winners' Cup	First round	(Bangladesh) Sheikh Mohammad Aslam	12
1993	Premier Division	18	12	5	1	36	10	29	Runners-up	—	—	—		(Bangladesh) Sheikh Mohammad Aslam	11
1994	Premier Division	18	10	8	0	33	8	28	Champions	Runners-up	—	—		N/A	
1995	Premier Division	18	13	4	1	29	8	43	Champions	Runners-up	—	—		(Bangladesh) Sheikh Mohammad Aslam	9
1996	Premier Division	18	13	4	1	31	11	43	Runners-up	—	—	—		(Bangladesh) Mizanur Rahman Mizan	8
1997/98	Premier Division	22	12	7	3	25	11	42	3rd	Champions	—	Asian Cup Winners' Cup	Second round	(Bangladesh) Maksudul Amin Rana	11
1999	Premier Division	18	11	4	3	27	12	37	Runners-up	Champions	—	—		(India) Syed Sabir Pasha	8
2000	Premier Division	17	11	3	3	44	15	37	3rd	Champions	—	—		(Ghana) Kennedy	17
2001/02	Premier Division	15	13	1	1	30	8	41	Champions	Group-Stage	—	—		(Nigeria) Colly Barnes	9
2002	Premier Division	13	9	3	1	30	12	31	Runners-up	Semi-finals	—	—		(Nigeria) Colly Barnes	12
2003/04	Premier Division	18	9	6	3	36	16	33	3rd	Semi-finals	—	—		(Bangladesh) Saiful Islam Khokon	10
2004/05	Premier Division	18	11	5	2	38	15	38	3rd	3rd	Semi-finals	—		(Ghana) Awudu Ibrahim	11
2005	Premier Division	Season cancelled													
2006	Premier Division	Season cancelled													

=== Professional league (2007–present) ===
Record as Bangladesh Football League member
Season	Division	League								Federation Cup	Independence Cup	Asian club competition		Top league scorer(s)	
Season	Division	P	W	D	L	GF	GA	Pts	Position	Federation Cup	Independence Cup	Asian club competition		Player	Goals
2007	B.League	20	14	5	1	36	8	47	Champions	—	—	AFC President's Cup	Group stage	(Bangladesh) Zahid Hasan Ameli	12
2008/09	B.League	20	16	2	2	45	11	50	Champions	Runners-up	—	AFC President's Cup	Group stage	(Nigeria) Emeka Christian	17
2009/10	B.League	24	22	1	1	63	8	67	Champions	Runners-up	—	AFC President's Cup	Group stage	(Bangladesh) Enamul Haque	21
2010	B.League	22	13	5	4	30	15	44	4th	Champions	Quarter-finals	AFC President's Cup	Group stage	(Ghana) Twum Frank	11
2011/12	BPL	20	13	6	1	42	15	45	Champions	Quarter-finals	—	—		(Nigeria) Otofe Lucky Paul	12
2012/13	BPL	16	8	5	3	23	15	29	3rd	Quarter-finals	Semi-finals	AFC President's Cup	Group stage	(Bangladesh) Shakhawat Hossain Rony	7
2013/14	BPL	27	14	10	3	36	16	52	Runners-up	Semi-finals	Semi-finals	—		(Ghana) Osei Morrison	12
2014/15	BPL	20	10	5	5	32	13	35	4th	Quarter-finals	—	—		(Nigeria) Sunday Chizoba	10
2015–16	BPL	22	15	7	0	48	16	52	Champions	Champions	Runners-up	AFC Cup	Group stage	(Nigeria) Sunday Chizoba	19
2017/18	BPL	22	16	4	2	35	13	52	Champions	Champions	Quarter-finals	AFC Cup	Group stage	(Nigeria) Sunday Chizoba	9
2018/19	BPL	24	19	1	4	60	28	58	Runners-up	Champions	Semi-finals	AFC Cup	Inter-zone Semi-final	(Nigeria) Sunday Chizoba	20
2019/20	BPL	Abandoned								Quarter-finals	—	AFC Cup	Preliminary round 2	(Nigeria) Sunday Chizoba	5
2020/21	BPL	24	13	8	3	65	29	47	3rd	Semi-finals	—	AFC Cup	Withdrew	(Haiti) Kervens Belfort	17
2021/22	BPL	22	14	5	3	55	22	47	Runners-up	Champions	Champions	AFC Cup	Play-off round	(Brazil) Dorielton Gomes	18
2022/23	BPL	20	12	4	4	45	18	40	Runners-up	Runners-up	3rd	—		(Costa Rica) Daniel Colindres	12
2023/24	BPL	18	9	5	4	34	22	32	3rd	Semi-finals	Semi-finals	AFC Cup	Play-off round	(Saint Vincent and the Grenadines) Cornelius Stewart	19

== Performance in AFC competitions ==
Asian Club Championship/AFC Champions League: 1 appearance

- 1985–86: Qualifying round

Asian Cup Winners' Cup: 2 appearances

- 1991–92: First round
- 1997–98: Second round

AFC President's Cup/AFC Challenge League: 6 appearances

- 2008: Group stage
- 2009: Group stage
- 2010: Group stage
- 2011: Group stage
- 2013: Group stage

AFC Cup/AFC Champions League Two: 6 appearances

- 2017: Group stage
- 2018: Group stage
- 2019: Inter-zone play-off semi-finals
- 2020: Preliminary round 2
- 2022: Play-off round
- 2023–24: Play-off round

== Continental record ==
Season	Competition	Round	Club	Home	Away	Neutral	Aggregate	Top scorer(s)	Goals
1985–86	Asian Club Championship	Qualifying Stage	(India) East Bengal Club	—		0–1	2nd out of 6	(Bangladesh) Sheikh Mohammad Aslam	9
1985–86	Asian Club Championship	Qualifying Stage	(Sri Lanka) Saunders SC	—		4–1	2nd out of 6	(Bangladesh) Sheikh Mohammad Aslam	9
1985–86	Asian Club Championship	Qualifying Stage	(Pakistan) PIA	—		3–0	2nd out of 6	(Bangladesh) Sheikh Mohammad Aslam	9
1985–86	Asian Club Championship	Qualifying Stage	(Nepal) New Road Team	—		2–1	2nd out of 6	(Bangladesh) Sheikh Mohammad Aslam	9
1985–86	Asian Club Championship	Qualifying Stage	(Maldives) Club Valencia	—		8–1	2nd out of 6	(Bangladesh) Sheikh Mohammad Aslam	9
1991–92	Asian Cup Winners' Cup	First round	(India) East Bengal Club	0–0	0–1	—	0–1	—	
1997–98	Asian Cup Winners' Cup	First round	(Sri Lanka) Old Benedictines	5–0	3–0	—	8–0		
1997–98	Asian Cup Winners' Cup	Second round	(China) Beijing Guoan	0–1	0–2	—	0–3		
2008	AFC President's Cup	Group stage	Nepal Police Club	—		0–4	3rd out of 4	(Ghana) Awudu Ibrahim (Bangladesh) Zahid Hasan Ameli	1
2008	AFC President's Cup	Group stage	(Tajikistan) Regar-TadAZ	—		1–2	3rd out of 4	(Ghana) Awudu Ibrahim (Bangladesh) Zahid Hasan Ameli	1
2008	AFC President's Cup	Group stage	(Pakistan) WAPDA	—		1–0	3rd out of 4	(Ghana) Awudu Ibrahim (Bangladesh) Zahid Hasan Ameli	1
2009	AFC President's Cup	Group stage	Sri Lanka Army	—		2–1	3rd out of 4	(Bangladesh) Wali Faisal (Bangladesh) Shahajuddin Tipu	1
2009	AFC President's Cup	Group stage	(Turkmenistan) FC Aşgabat	—		0–0	3rd out of 4	(Bangladesh) Wali Faisal (Bangladesh) Shahajuddin Tipu	1
2011	AFC President's Cup	Group stage	(Kyrgyzstan) Neftchi Kochkor-Ata	—		0–2	3rd out of 4	(Ghana) Awudu Ibrahim	3
2011	AFC President's Cup	Group stage	(Cambodia) Phnom Penh Crown	—		0–1	3rd out of 4	(Ghana) Awudu Ibrahim	3
2011	AFC President's Cup	Group stage	(Sri Lanka) Don Bosco	—		4–1	3rd out of 4	(Ghana) Awudu Ibrahim	3
2013	AFC President's Cup	Group stage	(Nepal) Three Star Club	—		1–1	4th out of 4	(Bangladesh) Shakhawat Hossain Rony (Bangladesh) Towhidul Alam Towhid	1
2013	AFC President's Cup	Group stage	(Chinese Taipei) Taiwan Power Company	—		1–1	4th out of 4	(Bangladesh) Shakhawat Hossain Rony (Bangladesh) Towhidul Alam Towhid	1
2013	AFC President's Cup	Group stage	(Mongolia) Erchim FC	—		0–1	4th out of 4	(Bangladesh) Shakhawat Hossain Rony (Bangladesh) Towhidul Alam Towhid	1
2017	AFC Cup	Group stage	(Maldives) Maziya S&RC	0–2	0–2	—	4th out of 4	(Bangladesh) Md Saad Uddin (Bangladesh) Rubel Miya (Wales) Jonathan Brown (Nigeria) Emeka Onuoha	1
2017	AFC Cup	Group stage	(India) Mohun Bagan	1–3	1–1	—	4th out of 4	(Bangladesh) Md Saad Uddin (Bangladesh) Rubel Miya (Wales) Jonathan Brown (Nigeria) Emeka Onuoha	1
2017	AFC Cup	Group stage	(India) Bengaluru FC	2–0	0–2	—	4th out of 4	(Bangladesh) Md Saad Uddin (Bangladesh) Rubel Miya (Wales) Jonathan Brown (Nigeria) Emeka Onuoha	1
2018	AFC Cup	Group stage	(Maldives) New Radiant S.C.	0–1	1–5	—	3rd out of 4	(Japan) Seiya Kojima	2
2018	AFC Cup	Group stage	(India) Bengaluru FC	0–4	0–1	—	3rd out of 4	(Japan) Seiya Kojima	2
2018	AFC Cup	Group stage	(India) Aizawl FC	1–1	3–0	—	3rd out of 4	(Japan) Seiya Kojima	2
2019	AFC Cup	Group stage	(Nepal) Manang Marshyangdi Club	5–0	1–0	—	1st out of 4	(Nigeria) Sunday Chizoba	4
2019	AFC Cup	Group stage	(India) Minerva Punjab	2–2	1–0	—	1st out of 4	(Nigeria) Sunday Chizoba	4
2019	AFC Cup	Group stage	(India) Chennaiyin FC	0–1	3–2	—	1st out of 4	(Nigeria) Sunday Chizoba	4
2019	AFC Cup	Inter-zone play-off semi-finals	(North Korea) April 25 SC	4–3	0–2	—	4–5	(Nigeria) Sunday Chizoba	4
2020	AFC Cup	Preliminary round 2	(Maldives) Maziya S&RC	2–2	0–0	—	2–2	(Nigeria) Sunday Chizoba (Brazil) Maílson Alves	1
2022	AFC Cup	Preliminary round 2	(India) ATK Mohun Bagan	1–3	—		1–3	(Costa Rica) Daniel Colindres	1
2023–24	AFC Cup	Preliminary round 2	(Maldives) Club Eagles	2–1	—		2–1	(Costa Rica) Cornelius Stewart	2
2023–24	AFC Cup	Play-off round	(India) Mohun Bagan SG	1–3	—		1–3	(Costa Rica) Cornelius Stewart	2

== Notable players ==
- The players below had senior international cap(s) for their respective countries. Players whose name is listed, represented their countries before or after playing for Abahani Limited Dhaka.

Asia

- (Sri Lanka) Pakir Ali (1981–89)
- (Sri Lanka) Ratnayaka Premalal (1985–89)
- (Nepal) Ganesh Thapa (1982)
- (India) Monoranjan Bhattacharya (1986)
- (India) Bhaskar Ganguly (1986)
- (Iraq) Samir Shaker (1987–88)
- (Iraq) Karim Allawi (1987–88)
- (Sri Lanka) Roshan Perera (1997–98)
- (India) Syed Sabir Pasha (1999–00)
- (Afghanistan) Masih Saighani (2018–19; 2020–21)
- (Syria) Yousef Mohammad (2022–23)

Africa

- (The Gambia) Abdou Darboe (2015)
- (Nigeria) Emeka Ogbugh (2023–24)

North America

- (Haiti) Kervens Belfort (2018–21)
- (Costa Rica) Daniel Colindres (2021–23)
- (Saint Vincent and the Grenadines) Cornelius Stewart (2023–24)

== Honours ==
Type	Competitions	Titles	Seasons
Domestic	Bangladesh Football League	6	2007, 2008–09, 2009–10, 2011–12, 2015–16, 2017–18
Domestic	Dhaka First Division/Premier Division League	11	1974, 1977, 1981, 1983, 1984, 1985, 1989–90, 1991–92, 1994, 1995, 2001
Domestic	National League	1	2000
Domestic	Federation Cup	12	1982 (shared), 1985, 1986, 1988, 1997, 1999, 2000, 2010, 2016, 2017, 2018, 2021–22
Domestic	Independence Cup	2	1990, 2021–22
Domestic	Super Cup	1	2011
Domestic	DMFA Cup	1	1994

=== Friendly ===
- (Bangladesh) Liberation Cup
  - Winners (1): 1977
- (Bangladesh) Independence Day Football Tournament
  - Winners (1): 2005
- (Bangladesh) Victory Day Club Cup
  - Winners (1): 2008

=== International ===
- (India) Sait Nagjee Trophy
  - Winners (1): 1989
- (Bangladesh) Azmiri Begum Gold Cup
  - Winners (1): 1990
- (Bangladesh) BTC Club Cup
  - Winners (1): 1991
- (India) Charms Cup
  - Winners (1): 1994
- (India) Bordoloi Trophy
  - Winners (1): 2010
- (India) Independence Day Cup
  - Runners-up (1): 1993

== Notable wins against foreign teams ==
As of matches played 28 August 2019

Competition	Round	Year	Opposition	Score	Venue	City	Scorers	Ref
Friendly	–	1979	(India) Kolkata Mohammedan	2–1	Dhaka Stadium	Dhaka	Salahuddin, N/A	
Aga Khan Gold Cup	Third Phase	1979	Afghanistan XI	5–1	Dhaka Stadium	Dhaka	Salahuddin (2), Chunnu (2), Babul	
Aga Khan Gold Cup	Group stage	1982	(Indonesia) Persipal	5–0	Dhaka Stadium	Dhaka		
Sait Nagjee Trophy	Final	1989	(India) Salgaocar	1–0	EMS Stadium	Kozhikode	Aslam	
Azmiri Begum Gold Cup	Final	1990	(India) Mohun Bagan	1–0	Shaheed Bulu Stadium	Noakhali	Wasim	
BTC Clubs Cup	Semi-final	1991	(India) East Bengal	2–1	Dhaka Stadium	Calcutta	Aslam, Rumi	
Charms Cup	Final	1994	(India) Kolkata Mohammedan	2–0	Salt Lake Stadium	Kolkata	Joarder, Mintu	
AFC Cup	Inter-zone play-off semi-finals	2019	(North Korea) April 25	4–3	Bangabandhu National Stadium	Dhaka	S. Rana, Jibon, Chizoba (2)	

== Club records ==
=== Individual ===
- Kazi Salahuddin is the club's all-time top scorer with a total of 142 goals in the First Division.
- Abdus Sadek became the club's first captain during its inaugural First Division match, which came on 11 June 1972, against BJIC.
- Kazi Salahuddin scored 24 goals during the 1974 First Division League, which is the highest a player has scored for the club in a single league season.
- Sheikh Mohammad Aslam scored five goals against Club Valencia during the 1985–86 Asian Club Championship which is a record set by a Bangladeshi player in an AFC competition.
- In 1977, Abdus Sadek became the first coach since the Independence of Bangladesh to win the First Division as unbeaten champion.
- In 1991, the club paid Monem Munna a record fee, 2 million taka, which was also a unique record for the whole of South Asia at that time.
- Monem Munna holds the record of captaining the club the highest amount of times. He captained them in 1990, 1991, 1994, 1995 and 1996. No other captain has led the club to the league title twice, coming in 1994 and 1995.
- Arif Khan Joy scored the club's first Bangladesh Football League goal against Mohammedan SC in a 1–0 victory, on 23 March 2007.
- Enamul Haque became the first and only Bangladeshi player to date to become top-scorer in the Bangladesh Football League with 21 goals.
- Amalesh Sen coached the club into becoming the first hat-trick Bangladesh Football League champions (2007, 2008–09, 2009–10).
- Sunday Chizoba of Nigeria is the top scorer for the club in the Bangladesh Football League with 71 goals.

=== Overall records ===
- First club after the independence of Bangladesh to participate in the IFA Shield in 1974.
- First club after the independence of Bangladesh to win a hat-trick of First Division titles (1983, 1984 and 1985).
- Second most registered undefeated league triumphs in the First Division/Premier Division League, coming in 1977, 1983, 1991–92 and 1994.
- The club's 8–1 victory over Club Valencia in the 1985–86 Asian Club Championship is the biggest winning margin by a Bangladeshi club in the AFC Club Championship.
- First club from Bangladesh to win India's Sait Nagjee Trophy, in its three-and-a-half-decade history.
- First club to win the Bangladesh Football League (formerly known as the B.League), coming during its first edition in 2007.
- First club to win a hat-trick of Bangladesh Football League titles (2007, 2008–09, 2009–10).
- The club holds the record for the longest unbeaten run in the Bangladesh Football League, going unbeaten from 5 December 2008 to 1 June 2010.
- First club to win the Bangladesh Football League as undefeated champions, during its 2015–16 edition.
- First club from Bangladesh to reach the Inter-zone play-off semi-finals of the AFC Cup, during its 2019 edition.

== See also ==
- Abahani Limited cricket team
