= Drago Mamić =

Serbian-born Croatian footballer and manager

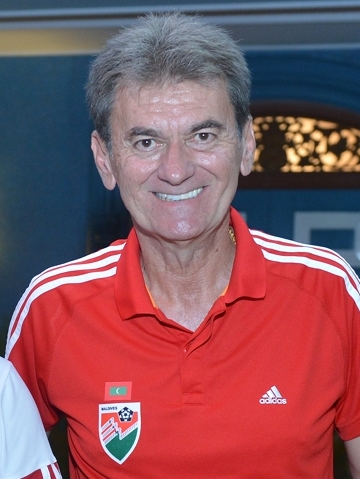
- Mamić as Maldives manager in 2014

Personal information
- Full name: Drago Mamić
- Date of birth: 9 February 1954 (age 72)
- Place of birth: Valjevo, FPR Yugoslavia

Senior career*
Years	Team	Apps	(Gls)
- Orijent
- Jadran Poreč
- Sabah

Managerial career
- 1988–1996: Orijent (youth)
- 1990–1996: Croatia (youth)
- 1996–1997: Orijent (assistant)
- 1997–1998: Orijent
- 1999–2000: Sichuan Quanxing
- 2000–2003: Dalian Shide (assistant)
- 2003–2005: Guangzhou Rizhiquan (assistant)
- 2005–2006: Guangzhou Rizhiquan (caretaker)
- 2007–2008: Sabah
- 2009–2010: Myanmar
- 2010–2011: Churchill Brothers
- 2011–2012: Persib Bandung
- 2014–2015: Maldives
- 2016: Abahani Limited Dhaka
- 2016: Sime Darby
- 2017: Abahani Limited Dhaka
- 2017–2018: Chainat Hornbill
- 2020: Saif Sporting Club
Medal record
Men's football
Representing Maldives (as manager)
AFC Challenge Cup
Bronze medal – third place	2014
- * Club domestic league appearances and goals

Drago Mamić (born February 9, 1954) is a Serbian-born Croatian retired football player and manager.

== Managerial career ==
He last managed Bangladesh Premier League side Saif Sporting Club. He is also the former manager of Maldives. He has a UEFA 'Pro' Licence football coach. In September 2011, he was appointed as manager of Indonesia Super League team Persib Bandung. After six months and finishing in the 7th place he resigned from that club on 28 March 2012. He helped Churchill Brothers SC to win the IFA Shield.
