= Suktara Jubo Sangsad =

Bangladesh football team

Suktara Jubo Sangshad
- Full name: Suktara Jubo Sangsad Sporting Club
- Nickname: The Stars
- Founded: 15 April 1974; 52 years ago
- Ground: Narayanganj Osmani Stadium
- Capacity: 4,000
- Chairman: Mozammel Hague Talukder
- Head coach: Mohammad Mamun
- League: Bangladesh Championship League
- 2025–26: 5th of 10

Suktara Jubo Sangsad (Bengali: শুকতারা যুব সংসদ) is a Bangladeshi football club based in Narayanganj. It was the first and only club from Narayanganj District that competed in the Bangladesh Football League. It currently competes in the Bangladesh Championship League, the second-tier of Bangladeshi football.

The 4,000 capacity Narayanganj Osmani Stadium was its home venue when it competed in the Premier League in the 2009–10 season. The club has been absent from professional football since its relegation in the same season.

== History ==
Suktara Jubo Sangsad was formed in 1974 and is located in the Isdair neighborhood of Narayanganj. The club soon became one of the largest in Narayanganj District and an established force in district football competitions. Narayanganj Mohsin Club is considered Shuktara's main rival club. Encounters between Shuktara and Mohsin Club have involved instances of fights between their supporters in the gallery.

In 2009, the Bangladesh Football Federation (BFF) organized the Bashundhara Club Cup Championship with District Football League champions outside Dhaka. Shuktara participated in the tournament as the 2008 Narayanganj First Division Football League champions and also became champions by defeating Feni Soccer Club 1–0. Its title triumph saw them being provided with Tk 3 lakhs along with entry to the country's first professional league, the Bangladesh Football League.

The club began its professional league journey from the 2009–10 season, only to be relegated in its inaugural season. The Narayanganj Osmani Stadium, located near the clubhouse, was used as its home venue and hosted 12 professional league fixtures. They played 24 matches in the league, of which they won four. Following relegation, the club did not participate in the second-tier professional league, the Bangladesh Championship League since its establishment in 2012, citing financial difficulties. After a period of absence from the professional tiers, the club officially marked its return to the domestic football pyramid for the 2025–26 season.

== Current Squad ==
Suktara Jubo Sangsad squad for the 2025–26 season.

Note: Flags indicate national team as defined under FIFA eligibility rules; some limited exceptions apply. Players may hold more than one non-FIFA nationality.

No.	Pos.	Nation	Player
1	GK	BAN	Mohammad Al Amin
2	GK	BAN	Mohammad Rashedul Islam
3	GK	BAN	Rashed Chowdhury
4	DF	BAN	Biplab Das
5	DF	BAN	Koysar Ahmed
6	DF	BAN	Muhammad Mohiuddin
7	DF	BAN	Mohammad Samsuzzaman
8	DF	BAN	Mohammad Abul Kashem
9	DF	BAN	Mohammad Monir Hossain
10	DF	BAN	Mohammad Robin Hasan
11	DF	BAN	Shohidul Islam
12	DF	NGA	Amadi Moses Nyegono

No.	Pos.	Nation	Player
13	MF	BAN	Jahidul Hasan Dalim
14	MF	BAN	Mohammad Sohel
15	MF	BAN	Mohammad Hanif Prodhan
16	MF	BAN	Mohammad Ullah Dalim
17	MF	BAN	Rezaul Karim Liton (Captain)
18	MF	BAN	Shahriar Abdullah
19	MF	BAN	Suzan Ahmed
20	FW	BAN	Mehedi Hasan
21	FW	BAN	Saiful Islam
22	FW	BAN	Mohammad Ashraful Awal
23	FW	UGA	Iddi Batambuze

== Personnel ==
=== Current technical staff ===
As of 15 December 2025

Position	Name
Chairman	(Bangladesh) Mozammel Hague Talukder
General Secretary	(Bangladesh) Anisur Rahman Juwel

== Head coach's record ==
As of 4 May 2026

Head coach	From	To	P	W	D	L	GF	GA	%W
(Bangladesh) Mohammad Mamun	10 November 2025	Present	18	7	4	7	29	30	38.89

== Honours ==
- Bashundhara Champions Club Cup
  - Winners (1): 2009
