= Amalesh Sen =

Bangladeshi association football player and manager

- Sen as manager of Dhaka Abahani in 2017

Personal information
- Full name: Amalesh Sen
- Date of birth: 2 March 1943
- Place of birth: Bogra, Bengal Presidency, British India
- Date of death: 7 October 2017 (aged 74)
- Place of death: Dhaka, Bangladesh
- Position: Midfielder

Senior career*
Years	Team	Apps	(Gls)
1962–1969	Fire Service		
1969–1970	East End Club		
1970–1971	Dhaka Mohammedan		
1972–1984	Dhaka Abahani		

International career
1971	Shadhin Bangla		
1975–1978	Bangladesh		

Managerial career
- 1990–1994: Muktijoddha Sangsad
- 1999–2017: Dhaka Abahani
- * Club domestic league appearances and goals

Amalesh Sen (Bengali: অমলেশ সেন; 2 March 1943 – 7 October 2017) was a Bangladeshi football player and coach. He started his career in Dhaka by playing for Fire Service Team and Shadhin Bangla Football Team, but spent most years as a player and coach for Dhaka Abahani.

Amalesh is the first ever goalscorer in a Dhaka Derby match, he scored the historic goal for Abahani in 1973. He later coached both Abahnai Limited Dhaka and Muktijoddha Sangsad KC in the Bangladesh Premier League. Amalesh holds the record for the most Bangladesh Premier League titles won by a single coach (3 for Abahani Limited Dhaka), and is also the first coach to win three consecutive Bangladesh Premier League titles.

== Playing career ==
Amalesh began his football career in the Byton Club, he played for Bogra District for almost two seasons in the National Football Championship competition between district team since 1958. And again under his leadership, Bogra district team became national champion in 1969. His Dhaka First Division League journey started in 1962 for the Fire Service Team, where he played for seven years. Amalesh then went onto play for the famous East End Club. Amalesh joined for Mohammedan SC in 1970. During the 1971 Bangladesh Liberation War, he also played in the Shadhin Bangla Football Team, where he along with his teammates played 16 exhibition games in India, in order to raise money for the war. After that, from 1972 to 1984, he played continuously for Dhaka Abahani.

Dhaka Abahani and Dhaka Mohammedan first played each other during the 1973 First Division League. The battle between of these two giants is now commonly known as Dhaka Derby, and Amalesh is the first player to score in the derby. During the game, Amalesh swifted past Moahmmedan stopper back Zakaria Pintoo and goalkeeper Abul Kashem to score the famous goal. Amalesh was part of Abahani's first league winning team, and further went onto win four more league titles along with the 1982 Federation Cup, which was shared with Mohammedan SC.

Amalesh Sen first played for the Bangladesh national football team in Malaysia, during the 1975 Merdeka Tournament. However, due to injury, he later withdrew and did not play for the national team for a long time. Although, Amalesh got a chance to join the Bangladesh team for the Bangkok 1978 Asian Games, that opportunity was also not taken by him, as all of Abahani's 7 footballers refrained from playing due to the teams captaincy complications involving their teammate Monwar Hossain Nannu.

== Coaching career ==
Sen continued his playing career till the early 80s before embarking on his coaching career in 1986. He stayed with Abahani Limited Dhaka till the late 90s before having a two-year stint with Muktijoddha Sangsad KC. He returned to Abahani in 1999 and remained with the club until his death, in 2017. He was Abahani's main coach from 2007 to 2010, 2010 to 2011, 2014 and 2015. He was a regular member of the clubs coaching panel for 18 years straight. He won three consecutive league titles as the clubs coach from 2007 to 2010, becoming the coach with the most Bangladesh Premier league titles wins. Amalesh also served as the vice-president of Bangladesh Football Coaches' Association.

== Personal life and death ==
Amalesh's family consists of his wife and two sons.

On 7 October 2017, Amalesh died after suffering a heart attack during a training session with Abahani Limited Dhaka. He was admitted to the Bangladesh Medical College Hospital where he was declared dead.

== Legacy ==
In 1998 Amalesh received the National Sports Awards, for his contribution to the Bangladesh national football team & Shadhin Bangla Football Team.

On 5 January 2018, Abahani emerged as the champion of the Bangladesh Premier League for the record sixth time. The club dedicated the title to the late Amalesh.
