= 2009–10 Bangladesh League =

3rd professional season of the top-flight football league in Bangladesh

Bangladesh Premier League
- Season: 2009–10
- Dates: 25 October 2009 – 5 June 2010
- Champions: Dhaka Abahani (3rd title)
- Relegated: Narayanganj Suktara Sangsad; Beanibazar SC
- AFC President's Cup: Dhaka Abahani
- Matches: 156
- Goals: 391 (2.51 per match)
- Top goalscorer: (Bangladesh) Enamul Haque (21 goals)
- Biggest home win: Dhaka Mohammedan SC 7–0 Narayanganj Suktara Sangsad (3 April 2010); Dhaka Mohammedan SC 7–0 Arambagh KS (13 April 2010)
- Biggest away win: Arambagh KS 1–6 Sheikh Russel KC (9 April 2010)
- Highest scoring: Dhaka Abahani 6–2 Chittagong Abahani (23 April 2010)
- Longest winning run: 11 games Dhaka Abahani
- Longest unbeaten run: 24 games Dhaka Mohammedan SC
- Longest winless run: 9 games Beanibazar SC; Narayanganj Suktara Sangsad

The 2009–10 Citycell Bangladesh League started on 25 October 2009 and ended on 5 June 2010. 13 teams competed with each other on a home and away basis.

The third edition of Bangladeshi football in the professional era was renamed from B League to Bangladesh League in order to combat suggestions that it is a second-tier league.

== Clubs ==
Locations of teams in the 2009-10 Bangladesh League
- Dhaka Abahani Limited, Dhaka
- Dhaka Mohammedan, Dhaka
- Sheikh Russel KC, Dhaka
- Brothers Union, Dhaka
- Chittagong Mohammedan, Chittagong
- Farashganj SC, Dhaka
- Rahmatganj MFS, Dhaka
- Chittagong Abahani, Chittagong
- Arambagh KS, Dhaka
- Muktijoddha Sangsad KC, Dhaka
- Beanibazar SC, Sylhet
- Feni Soccer Club, Feni
- Narayanganj Suktara Sangsad, Narayanganj

== Final standings ==
Pos	Team	Pld	W	D	L	GF	GA	GD	Pts	Qualification or relegation
1	Dhaka Abahani (C)	24	22	1	1	63	8	+55	67	2011 President's Cup
2	Dhaka Mohammedan	24	19	5	0	63	12	+51	62	
3	Sheikh Russel KC	24	15	5	4	49	19	+30	50	
4	Feni Soccer Club	24	7	9	8	16	22	−6	30	
5	Arambagh KS	24	6	9	9	30	43	−13	27	
6	Muktijoddha Sangsad	24	8	3	13	26	46	−20	27	
7	Brothers Union	24	5	11	8	20	26	−6	26	
8	Rahmatganj MFS	24	7	5	12	28	36	−8	26	
9	Chittagong Mohammedan	24	5	11	8	21	33	−12	26	
10	Farashganj SC	24	4	11	9	20	25	−5	23	
11	Chittagong Abahani	24	5	6	13	24	43	−19	21	
12	Narayanganj Suktara (R)	24	4	8	12	12	35	−23	20	Relegation
13	Beanibazar SC (R)	24	3	8	13	19	43	−24	17	Relegation

Source: Soccerway
Rules for classification: 1) points; 2) goal difference; 3) number of goals scored.
(C) Champions; (R) Relegated

== Season statistics ==
=== Top scorers ===
Rank	Player	Club	Goals
1	(Bangladesh) Enamul Haque	Dhaka Abahani	21
2	(Bangladesh) Zahid Hasan Ameli	Mohammedan SC	19
3	(Ghana) Sheriff Deen Mohammed	Chittagong Mohammedan SC	16
4	(Nigeria) Alamu Bukola Olalekan	Dhaka Mohammedan	14
5	(Bangladesh) Alfaz Ahmed	Arambagh KS	12
5	(Bangladesh) Shakhawat Hossain Rony	Sheikh Russel KC	12
7	(Ghana) Enock Bentil	Brothers Union	10
8	(Ghana) Awudu Ibrahim	Dhaka Abahani	9

=== Goalscorers ===
There have been 391 goals scored in 156 matches, for an average of 2.51 goals per match (as of June 2010).

21 goals

- (Bangladesh) Enamul Haque (Dhaka Abahani)

19 goals

- (Bangladesh) Zahid Hasan Ameli (Dhaka Mohammedan)

16 goals

- (Ghana) Sheriff Din Mohammed (Dhaka Abahani)

14 goals

- (Nigeria) Alamu Bukola Olalekan (Dhaka Mohammedan)

12 goals

- (Bangladesh) Alfaz Ahmed (Arambagh KS)
- (Bangladesh) Shakhawat Hossain Rony (Sheikh Russel KC)

10 goals

- (Ghana) Enock Bentil (Brothers Union)

9 goals

- (Ghana) Awudu Ibrahim (Dhaka Abahani)

7 goals

- (Bangladesh) Abdul Baten Mojumdar Komol (Dhaka Mohammedan)

6 goals

- (Bangladesh) Nasiruddin Chowdhury (Dhaka Mohammedan)
- (Bangladesh) Rezaul Karim Liton (Narayanganj Suktara Sangsad)
- (Bangladesh) Tawhidul Alam Sabuz (Farashganj SC)

5 goals

- (Nigeria) Emeka Christina (Dhaka Mohammedan)
- (Guinea) Rafael Sagno (Muktijoddha Sangsad KC)

4 goals

- (Morocco) Jamal Nakhle (Sheikh Russel KC)
- (Nigeria) Subair Muhammed Omobolaji (Arambagh KS)

3 goals

- (Bangladesh) Mohamed Abul Hossain (Dhaka Abahani)
- (Bangladesh) Mamunul Islam (Dhaka Mohammedan)
- (Bangladesh) Murad Ahmed Milon (Brothers Union)
- (Bangladesh) Rajon Miah (Sheikh Russel KC)
- (Bangladesh) Rokonuzzaman Kanchan (Muktijoddha Sangsad KC)
- (Bangladesh) Roni Islam (Muktijoddha Sangsad KC)
- (Bangladesh) Tanmoy Hossain Taru (Brothers Union)

2 goals

- (Bangladesh) Fuad Ali (Muktijoddha Sangsad KC)
- (Bangladesh) Mehedi Hassan Tapu (Narayanganj Suktara Sangsad)
- (Bangladesh) Mehedi Hasan Ujjal (Dhaka Abahani)
- (Bangladesh) Mohammad Yusuf (Sheikh Russel KC)
- (Bangladesh) Moksudul Alam Bulbul (Brothers Union)
- (Bangladesh) Motiur Rahman Munna (Dhaka Abahani)
- (Bangladesh) Nasirul Islam Nasir (Dhaka Mohammedan)
- (Bangladesh) Pranotosh Kumar Das (Dhaka Abahani)
- (Bangladesh) Shahedul Alam Shahed (Dhaka Abahani)
- (Bangladesh) Shakil Ahmed (Dhaka Mohammedan)
- (Bangladesh) Zahid Parvez Chowdhury (Dhaka Abahani)
- (Uganda) Kabuye Dominic (Arambagh KS)
- Idris Mutebi (Narayanganj Suktara Sangsad)

1 goal

- (Bangladesh) Abdullah Al Parvez (Sheikh Russel KC)
- (Bangladesh) Ajmaol Hossain Bidduth (Muktijoddha Sangsad KC)
- (Bangladesh) Atiqur Rahman Meshu (Dhaka Abahani)
- (Bangladesh) Didarul Alam (Brothers Union)
- (Bangladesh) Habibur Rahman Sohag (Dhaka Abahani)
- (Bangladesh) Hassan Al-Mamun (Dhaka Mohammedan)
- (Bangladesh) Jalal Uddin (Muktijoddha Sangsad KC)
- (Bangladesh) Kabir Hossain (Arambagh KS)
- (Bangladesh) Kamal Hossain (Sheikh Russel KC)
- (Bangladesh) Khalilur Rahman Faisal (Brothers Union)
- (Bangladesh) Khan Sharif (Arambagh KS)
- (Bangladesh) Maruf Ahmed (Sheikh Russel KC)
- (Bangladesh) Mofazzal Hossain Saikat (Dhaka Mohammedan)
- (Bangladesh) Mohammad Sohel (Narayanganj Suktara Sangsad)
- (Bangladesh) Mohammed Sujan (Dhaka Abahani)
- (Bangladesh) Rajani Kanta Barman (Dhaka Abahani)
- (Bangladesh) Rassel Ansari (Muktijoddha Sangsad KC)
- (Bangladesh) Zahid Hossain (Dhaka Mohammedan)
- (Ghana) Moro Mohammed (Sheikh Russel KC)
- (Togo) Hafan Al Barka (Sheikh Russel KC)
- (Nigeria) Paul Dami (Dhaka Mohammedan)
- (Nigeria) Amadi Moses Nyegono (Narayanganj Suktara Sangsad)
