= List of Bangladeshi football champions =

Bangladesh Football League (1st tier)

Dhaka First Division League (1971–1992) Dhaka Premier Division League (1993–2006) B.League (2007–2009) Bangladesh League (2009–2011) Bangladesh Premier League (2012–2025) Bangladesh Football League (2025–present)
- Country
- Bangladesh
- Founded
- 1948 (recognized) (Note: The Dhaka Football League has been held since at least 1911. However, champions from before the Partition of India, particularly in the First Division, have not yet been officially recognized by the Bangladesh Football Federation (BFF). In addition, a complete list of champions from its current three-tier structure during the British Raj is still incomplete and under research.)
- Number of teams
- 10 (2024–25 season)
- Current champions
- Bashundhara Kings (6th title)
- Most successful club
- Mohammedan (20 titles each)

The Bangladeshi football champions are the winners of the top league in Bangladesh, the Dhaka First Division League from 1971 to 1992, the Dhaka Premier Division League from 1993 to 2006, and the Bangladesh Football League (Note: Named "B.League" from 2007 to 2009, "Bangladesh League" from 2009 to 2011, "Bangladesh Premier League" from 2012 to 2025, "Bangladesh Football League" since 2025.) since 2007.

== Pre-independence era ==
=== Dhaka First Division League (1948–1970) ===
The district-based Dhaka First Division League, also known as the Dhaka Senior Division League, was the top football competition in the region following the partition of India. Unlike other district-based leagues in the province, the Dhaka Football League, as the province's premier football competition, was administered by the province's main sports governing body, the East Pakistan Sports Federation until the independence of Bangladesh.

| Season | Champions | Runner-up | Third place | Top Scorer | Goals |
|---|---|---|---|---|---|
| 1948 | Victoria | Wari | Unknown | Unknown | |
| 1949 | EP Gymkhana | Dhaka Wanderers | Victoria | Unknown | |
| 1950 | Dhaka Wanderers | EP Gymkhana | EB Railway | Unknown | |
| 1951 | Dhaka Wanderers | Unknown | Unknown | Unknown | |
| 1952 | EBG Press | Dhaka Wanderers | Unknown | (Pakistan) Rashid Chunna (EBG Press) | Unknown |
| 1953 | Dhaka Wanderers | Azad | Unknown | (Pakistan) Anwar Hossain (Azad) | 49 |
| 1954 | Dhaka Wanderers | EBG Press | EP Rifles | Unknown | |
| 1955 | Dhaka Wanderers | None | Unknown | Unknown | |
| 1956 | Dhaka Wanderers | Mohammedan | Unknown | Unknown | |
| 1957 | Mohammedan | Dhaka Wanderers | Unknown | Unknown | |
| 1958 | Azad | Central Printing Press | Mohammedan | (Pakistan) Tajul Islam Manna (Azad) | 25 |
| 1959 | Mohammedan | Dhaka Wanderers | Central Printing Press | (Pakistan) Ashraf Chowdhury (Mohammedan) | 16 |
| 1960 | Dhaka Wanderers | Mohammedan | DC Mills | (Pakistan) Muhammad Yaqub (Dhaka Wanderers) | 26 |
| 1961 | Mohammedan | Victoria | Dhaka Wanderers | (Pakistan) Ghulam Abbas Baloch (Mohammedan) | 42 |
| 1962 | Victoria | Dhaka Wanderers | Mohammedan | (Pakistan) Ghulam Abbas Baloch (Victoria) | 38 |
| 1963 | Mohammedan | Dhaka Wanderers | PWD | (Pakistan) Qayyum Changezi (Mohammedan) | 27 |
| 1964 | Victoria | Mohammedan | PWD | (Pakistan) Muhammad Umer (Victoria) | 32 |
| 1965 | Mohammedan | Victoria | Unknown | Unknown | |
| 1966 | Mohammedan | Dhaka Wanderers | EPIDC | (Pakistan) Moosa Ghazi (Mohammedan) | 51 |
| 1967 | EPIDC | Mohammedan | Victoria | Unknown | |
| 1968 | EPIDC | Mohammedan | Dhaka Wanderers | Ayub Dar (East Pakistan IDC) | 31 |
| 1969 | Mohammedan | Dilkusha | EPIDC | (Pakistan) Ali Nawaz Baloch (Mohammedan) | 45 |
| 1970 | EPIDC | Dhaka Wanderers | Unknown | Unknown | |

== Champions of Bangladesh ==
=== Dhaka First Division League (1971–1992) ===
| Season | Champions | Runner-up | Third place | Top Scorer | Goals |
|---|---|---|---|---|---|
| 1971 | Not held due to the Bangladesh Liberation War | | | | |
| 1972 | Not completed | | | | |
| 1973 | BIDC | Mohammedan; Dhaka Abahani; Dhaka Wanderers | Rahmatganj | (Bangladesh) Kazi Salahuddin (Dhaka Abahani) | 24 |
| 1974 | Dhaka Abahani | Dilkusha | BIDC | (Bangladesh) Golam Shahid Neelu (Dilkusha) | 16 |
| 1975 | Mohammedan | BJMC | Dhaka Abahani | (Bangladesh) AKM Nowsheruzzaman (Mohammedan) | 21 |
| 1976 | Mohammedan | Dhaka Abahani | None | (Bangladesh) Hafizuddin Ahmed (Mohammedan) (Bangladesh) Abdul Halim (PWD) | 13 |
| 1977 | Dhaka Abahani | Rahmatganj | None | (Bangladesh) Kazi Salahuddin (Dhaka Abahani) | 14 |
| 1978 | Mohammedan | Brothers Union | Dhaka Abahani | (Bangladesh) Enayetur Rahman Khan (Mohammedan) | 13 |
| 1979 | BJMC | Dhaka Abahani | Brothers Union | (Bangladesh) Kazi Salahuddin (Dhaka Abahani) | 14 |
| 1980 | Mohammedan | BJMC | Brothers Union | (Bangladesh) Kazi Salahuddin (Dhaka Abahani) | 15 |
| 1981 | Dhaka Abahani | Mohammedan; BJMC | Brothers Union | (Bangladesh) Mohammed Mohsin (Brothers Union) | 20 |
| 1982 | Mohammedan SC | Dhaka Abahani | Rahmatganj MFS | (Bangladesh) Abdus Salam Murshedy (Mohammedan) | 27 |
| 1983 | Dhaka Abahani | Mohammedan | Brothers Union | (Bangladesh) Arif Abdul Khalek (Brothers Union) | 14 |
| 1984 | Dhaka Abahani | Mohammedan | Rahmatganj | (Bangladesh) Sheikh Mohammad Aslam (Dhaka Abahani) | 17 |
| 1985 | Dhaka Abahani | Brothers Union | Mohammedan | (Bangladesh) Sheikh Mohammad Aslam (Dhaka Abahani) | 18 |
| 1986 | Mohammedan | Dhaka Abahani | Brothers Union | (Bangladesh) Sheikh Mohammad Aslam (Dhaka Abahani) | 20 |
| 1987 | Mohammedan | Dhaka Abahani | Muktijoddha | (Bangladesh) Sheikh Mohammad Aslam (Dhaka Abahani) | 14 |
| 1988–89 | Mohammedan | Dhaka Abahani | Brothers Union | (Iran) Bijan Taheri (Mohammedan) | 24 |
| 1989–90 | Dhaka Abahani | Mohammedan | Brothers Union | (Bangladesh) Sheikh Mohammad Aslam (Dhaka Abahani) | 11 |
| 1991 | Not Held | | | | |
| 1991–92 | Dhaka Abahani | Mohammedan | Brothers Union | (Uzbekistan) Azamat Abduraimov (Mohammedan) | 17 |

=== Dhaka Premier Division League (1993–2006) ===
The Dhaka Premier Division League was introduced as the top-tier in 1993.

| Season | Champions | Runner-up | Third place | Top Scorer | Goals |
|---|---|---|---|---|---|
| 1993 | Mohammedan | Dhaka Abahani | Muktijoddha | (Russia) Oleg Zhivotnikov (Mohammedan) | 13 |
| 1994 | Dhaka Abahani | Muktijoddha | Mohammedan | (Russia) Andrey Kazakov (Mohammedan) | 13 |
| 1995 | Dhaka Abahani | Mohammedan | Muktijoddha | (Bangladesh) Imtiaz Ahmed Nakib (Muktijoddha) | 12 |
| 1996 | Mohammedan | Dhaka Abahani | Muktijoddha | (Bangladesh) Imtiaz Ahmed Nakib (Muktijoddha) | 13 |
| 1997–98 | Muktijoddha | Mohammedan | Dhaka Abahani | (Bangladesh) Imtiaz Ahmed Nakib (Muktijoddha) | 13 |
| 1999 | Mohammedan | Dhaka Abahani | Muktijoddha | (Bangladesh) Imtiaz Ahmed Nakib (Muktijoddha) | 12 |
| 2000 | Muktijoddha | Dhaka Abahani | Mohammedan | (Ghana) Kennedy (Dhaka Abahani) | 17 |
| 2001 | Dhaka Abahani | Mohammedan | Rahmatganj | (Nigeria) Emeka Ochilifu (Mohammedan) (Bangladesh) Rezaul Karim Liton (Arambagh) | 10 |
| 2002 | Mohammedan | Dhaka Abahani | Muktijoddha | (Nigeria) Colly Barnes (Dhaka Abahani) | 12 |
| 2003–04 | Brothers Union | Sheikh Russel | Dhaka Abahani | (Cameroon) Etigo (Mohammedan) | 16 |
| 2005 | Brothers Union | Mohammedan | Dhaka Abahani | (Russia) Victor Edwards (Brothers Union) | 11 |
| 2005–06 | Not Held | | | | |
| 2006–07 | Not Held | | | | |

=== B.League (2007–2009) ===
In 2007, the B.League was introduced as Bangladesh's first professional national football league. It replaced the semi–professional district-based Dhaka Premier Division League as the country's top-tier. In an attempt to decentralise domestic football Bangladesh Football Federation introduced the professional league and gave entry to clubs from Khulna, Chittagong and Sylhet in the first edition. Previously the top-tier only allowed clubs from Dhaka to participate.

| Season | Champions | Runner-up | Third place | Top Scorer | Goals |
|---|---|---|---|---|---|
| 2007 | Dhaka Abahani | Mohammedan | Muktijoddha | (Nigeria) Junior Obagbemiro (Brothers Union) | 16 |
| 2008–09 | Dhaka Abahani | Mohammedan | Sheikh Russel | (Nigeria) Alamu Bukola Olalekan (Mohammedan) | 18 |

=== Bangladesh League (2009–2011) ===
The league was renamed to Bangladesh League in 2009.

| Season | Champions | Runner-up | Third place | Top Scorer | Goals |
|---|---|---|---|---|---|
| 2009–10 | Dhaka Abahani | Mohammedan | Muktijoddha | (Bangladesh) Enamul Haque (Dhaka Abahani) | 21 |
| 2010 | Sheikh Jamal | Muktijoddha | Sheikh Russel | (South Sudan) James Moga (Muktijoddha) | 19 |

=== Bangladesh Premier League (2012–2025) ===
The league was renamed to Bangladesh Premier League in 2012.

| Season | Champions | Runner-up | Third place | Top Scorer | Goals |
|---|---|---|---|---|---|
| 2011–12 | Dhaka Abahani | Muktijoddha | Mohammedan | (Guinea) Ismael Bangoura (BJMC) | 17 |
| 2012–13 | Sheikh Russel | Sheikh Jamal | Dhaka Abahani | (Ghana) Osei Morrison (Mohammedan) | 12 |
| 2013–14 | Sheikh Jamal | Dhaka Abahani | Muktijoddha | (Haiti) Wedson Anselme (Sheikh Jamal) | 26 |
| 2014–15 | Sheikh Jamal | Sheikh Russel KC | Mohammedan | (Nigeria) Emeka Darlington (Mohammedan) | 19 |
| 2015–16 | Dhaka Abahani | Chittagong Abahani | Sheikh Russel | (Nigeria) Sunday Chizoba (Dhaka Abahani) | 19 |
| 2017–18 | Dhaka Abahani | Sheikh Jamal | Chittagong Abahani | (The Gambia) Solomon King Kanform (Sheikh Jamal) | 15 |
| 2018–19 | Bashundhara Kings | Dhaka Abahani | Sheikh Russel | (Nigeria) Raphael Odovin Onwrebe (Sheikh Russel) | 22 |
| 2019–20 | Cancelled | | | | |
| 2020–21 | Bashundhara Kings | Sheikh Jamal | Dhaka Abahani | (Brazil) Robson Azevedo da Silva (Bashundhara Kings) | 21 |
| 2021–22 | Bashundhara Kings | Dhaka Abahani | Saif | (Mali) Souleymane Diabate (Mohammedan) | 21 |
| 2022–23 | Bashundhara Kings | Dhaka Abahani | Bangladesh Police | (Brazil) Dorielton (Bahsundhara Kings) | 20 |
| 2023–24 | Bashundhara Kings | Mohammedan SC | Dhaka Abahani | (Saint Vincent and the Grenadines) Cornelius Stewart (Dhaka Abahani) | 19 |
| 2024–25 | Mohammedan SC | Dhaka Abahani | Bashundhara Kings | (Ghana) Samuel Boateng (Rahmatganj) | 21 |

=== Bangladesh Football League (2025–present) ===
The league was renamed to Bangladesh Football League in 2025.

| Season | Champions | Runner-up | Third place | Top Scorer | Goals |
|---|---|---|---|---|---|
| 2025–26 | Bashundhara Kings | Dhaka Abahani | Fortis | (Brazil) Dorielton (Bashundhara Kings) | 20 |
| 2026–27 | | | | | |

== Winning clubs ==
=== Pre-independence ===
Titles won by club (%)
1. Mohammedan – 7 (30.4%)
2. Dhaka Wanderers – 7 (30.4%)
3. EPIDC/BJMC – 3 (13.0%)
4. Victoria – 3 (13.0%)
5. EP Gymkhana – 1 (4.30%)
6. EPG Press – 1 (4.30%)
7. Azad – 1 (4.30%)

| Club | Titles | Season | Location |
|---|---|---|---|
| Mohammedan | 7 | 1957, 1959, 1961, 1963, 1965, 1966, 1969 | Dhaka |
| Dhaka Wanderers | 7 | 1950, 1951, 1953, 1954, 1955, 1956, 1960 | Dhaka |
| EPIDC | 3 | 1967, 1968, 1970 | Dhaka |
| Victoria | 3 | 1948, 1962, 1964 | Dhaka |
| EP Gymkhana | 1 | 1949 | Dhaka |
| BG Press | 1 | 1952 | Dhaka |
| Azad | 1 | 1958 | Dhaka |

=== Post-independence ===
Titles won by club (%)
1. Dhaka Abahani – 17 (37.0%)
2. Mohammedan – 13 (28.3%)
3. Bashundhara Kings – 6 (13.0%)
4. Sheikh Jamal – 3 (6.50%)
5. BIDC/BJMC – 2 (4.30%)
6. Muktijoddha – 2 (4.30%)
7. Brothers Union – 2 (4.30%)
8. Sheikh Russel – 1 (2.20%)

| Club | Titles | Season | Location |
|---|---|---|---|
| Dhaka Abahani | 17 | 1974, 1977, 1981, 1983, 1984, 1985, 1989–90, 1991–92, 1994, 1995, 2001, 2008–09, 2009–10, 2011–12, 2015–16, 2017–18 | Dhaka |
| Mohammedan | 13 | 1975, 1976, 1978, 1980, 1982, 1986, 1987, 1988–89, 1993, 1996, 1999, 2002, 2024–25 | Dhaka |
| Bashundhara Kings | 6 | 2018–19, 2020–21, 2021–22, 2022–23, 2023–24, 2025–26 | Dhaka |
| Sheikh Jamal | 3 | 2010–11, 2013–14, 2014–15 | Dhaka |
| BJMC/BIDC | 2 | 1973, 1979 | Dhaka |
| Muktijoddha | 2 | 1997–98, 2000 | Dhaka |
| Brothers Union | 2 | 2003–04, 2005 | Dhaka |
| Sheikh Russel | 1 | 2012–13 | Dhaka |

== See also ==
- Bangladesh Football League
- Dhaka Premier Division Football League
- Dhaka First Division Football League
- Bangladesh Super Cup
- Bangladeshi football league system
- Football in Bangladesh
- Bangladesh Women's Football League
- List of Dhaka Football League champions
