= 1989–90 Asian Club Championship =

9th edition of premier club football tournament organized by the AFC

1989–1990 Asian Club Championship
Tournament details
- Dates: 10 June 1989 – 29 April 1990
- Teams: 27

Final positions
- Champions: (China) Liaoning (1st title)
- Runners-up: (Japan) Nissan Yokohama

Tournament statistics
- Matches played: 59
- Goals scored: 178 (3.02 per match)

The 1989–90 Asian Club Championship was the 9th edition of the annual Asian club football competition hosted by Asian Football Confederation.

Liaoning of China won the final; both the club and the country became Asian champions for the first time.

== Qualifying tournament ==
=== Group 1 ===
Pos	Team	Pld	W	D	L	GF	GA	GD	Pts	Qualification
1	(Jordan) Al-Deffatain (H)	4	3	1	0	7	1	+6	7	Qualify to Group stage
2	(Iraq) Al-Rasheed	4	2	1	1	5	2	+3	5	Qualify to Group stage
3	(Lebanon) Al Ansar	4	1	2	1	2	3	−1	4	
4	(Qatar) Al-Sadd	4	1	1	2	2	6	−4	3	
5	(Yemen) Al-Ahli	4	0	1	3	1	5	−4	1	

Source: RSSSF
(H) Hosts

Played in Amman, Jordan

20 July 1989

Al-Deffatain (Jordan)	2–0	(Yemen) Al-Ahli
Jihad Abdulmonem 48', 54'

21 July 1989

Al-Rasheed (Iraq)	3–0	(Qatar) Al-Sadd
Radhi 51'; Ali Kazem 64'; Riad Abdulabbas 67'

22 July 1989

Al-Deffatain (Jordan)	0–0	(Lebanon) Al Ansar

23 July 1989

Al-Rasheed (Iraq)	1–0	(Yemen) Al-Ahli
Riad Abdulabbas 7'

24 July 1989

Al Ansar (Lebanon)	0–2	(Qatar) Al-Sadd
		Khaled Habib 5' Jawhar 38'

26 July 1989

Al-Deffatain (Jordan)	2–1	(Iraq) Al-Rasheed
Jihad Abdulmonen 27'; Mahmoud Al Banna 36'		Radhi 36'

27 July 1989

Al-Sadd (Qatar)	0–0	(Yemen) Al-Ahli

28 July 1989

Al-Rasheed (Iraq)	0–0	(Lebanon) Al Ansar

30 July 1989

Al Ansar (Lebanon)	2–1	(Yemen) Al-Ahli
Alloush 55'; Ibrahim Berjawi 57'		Ahmed Al Zakra 30'

31 July 1989

Al-Deffatain (Jordan)	3–0	(Qatar) Al-Sadd
Jihad Abdulmonem 17', 36'; Louay Abdulrahmen 47'

=== Group 2 ===
Pos	Team	Pld	W	D	L	GF	GA	GD	Pts	Qualification
1	(Kuwait) Al-Arabi	4	2	1	1	8	6	+2	5	Qualify to Group stage
2	(Bahrain) Muharraq (H)	4	2	1	1	6	4	+2	5	Qualify to Group stage
3	(Oman) Fanja (Note: Fanja SC only played for the GCC Tournament.)	4	2	1	1	6	4	+2	5	
4	(United Arab Emirates) Al-Wasl	4	2	0	2	4	6	−2	4	
5	(Saudi Arabia) Al-Hilal	4	0	1	3	4	8	−4	1	

Source: RSSSF
(H) Hosts

=== Group 3 ===
Pos	Team	Pld	W	D	L	GF	GA	GD	Pts	Qualification
1	(Oman) Fanja (H)	3	3	0	0	10	1	+9	6	Qualify to Group stage
2	(India) Salgaocar SC	3	1	1	1	4	3	+1	3	
3	(Pakistan) Punjab	3	0	2	1	1	3	−2	2	
4	(Nepal) Kathmandu SC	3	0	1	2	1	9	−8	1	

Source: RSSSF
(H) Hosts

Played in Muscat, Oman

22 July 1989

Fanja (Oman)	2–0	(Pakistan) Punjab
Hilal Hmayed 24', 73'

23 July 1989

Salgaocar (India)	3–0	(Nepal) Kathmandu SC
Roy Barrito 67'; Coutinho 82', 87'

25 July 1989

Fanja (Oman)	5–0	(Nepal) Kathmandu SC
Hilal Hmayed 8', 47'; Abdulrahmen 13'; Hussein 83', 88'

26 July 1989

Salgaocar (India)	0–0	(Pakistan) Punjab

28 July 1989

Punjab (Pakistan)	1–1	(Nepal) Kathmandu SC
Nilson 81'		Ahmed Azizi 66'

29 July 1989

Fanja (Oman)	3–1	(India) Salgaocar
Hilal Hmayed 12', 17', 37'		Valentein Izoygo 80'

=== Group 4 ===
Pos	Team	Pld	W	D	L	GF	GA	GD	Pts	Qualification
1	(Iran) Shahin Ahvaz (H)	3	3	0	0	11	0	+11	6	Qualify to Group stage
2	(Bangladesh) Mohammedan SC	3	2	0	1	10	4	+6	4	
3	(Sri Lanka) Old Benedictans SC	3	1	0	2	4	9	−5	2	
4	(Maldives) Victory SC	3	0	0	3	3	15	−12	0	

Source: RSSSF
(H) Hosts

Played in Ahvaz, Iran

20 July 1989

Shahin Ahvaz (Iran)	5–0	(Maldives) Victory SC
Kurosh Bakhtiari; Kurosh Habibi; Farzad Ahkpour

21 July 1989

Mohammedan SC (Bangladesh)	3–1	(Sri Lanka) Old Benedictans SC
Kaiser; Sabbir; Taheri		Premalal

22 July 1989

Mohammedan SC (Bangladesh)	7–2	(Maldives) Victory SC
Taheri; Sabbir; Mizan

23 July 1989

Shahin Ahvaz (Iran)	5–0	(Sri Lanka) Old Benedictans SC

24 July 1989

Old Benedictans SC (Sri Lanka)	3–1	(Maldives) Victory SC

25 July 1989

Shahin Ahvaz (Iran)	1–0	(Bangladesh) Mohammedan SC
Bakhtiarizadeh 66'

=== Group 5 ===
Pos	Team	Pld	W	D	L	GF	GA	GD	Pts	Qualification
1	(Malaysia) Kuala Lumpur FA (H)	4	4	0	0	19	4	+15	8	Qualify to Group stage
2	(Indonesia) Pelita Jaya	4	3	0	1	10	4	+6	6	Qualify to Group stage
3	(Singapore) Geylang International	4	2	0	2	11	9	+2	4	
4	(Philippines) Philippine Air Force	4	1	0	3	1	12	−11	2	
5	(Brunei) Muara Stars FC	4	0	0	4	3	15	−12	0	

Source: RSSSF
(H) Hosts

Played in Kuala Lumpur, Malaysia

10 June 1989

Kuala Lumpur FA (Malaysia)	6–0	(Philippines) Philippine Air Force
K. Kannan 3', 24', 35', 48', 85'; Ramlan Askolani 31'

Cheras Stadium
10 June 1989

Pelita Jaya (Indonesia)	2–1	(Brunei) Muara Stars FC
Noach Meriem 16'; Agus Suparman 19'		Abdul Rahman Jaafar 42'

Cheras Stadium

12 June 1989

Geylang International (Singapore)	3–0	(Philippines) Philippine Air Force
Razali Saad 17'; Steven Choo 39'; Razali Rashid 55'

Bandar Tun Razak Stadium
12 June 1989

Kuala Lumpur FA (Malaysia)	7–1	(Brunei) Muara Stars FC
Saidi Osman 12', 89'; K. Kannan 29', 42', 46', 65'; Razip Ismail 75'		Sahari Timbang 10'

Bandar Tun Razak Stadium

14 June 1989

Kuala Lumpur FA (Malaysia)	2–1	(Indonesia) Pelita Jaya
Fandi Ahmad 9' 22'		Tang Siew Seng 71' (o.g)

14 June 1989

Geylang International (Singapore)	5–1	(Brunei) Muara Stars FC
Salim Moin 47'; Razali Rashid 59' 67'; Kadir Yahya 64'; Steven Choo 70'		Majedhy Ghani 28'

16 June 1989

Philippine Air Force (Philippines)	1–0	(Brunei) Muara Stars FC

16 June 1989

Pelita Jaya (Indonesia)	4–1	(Singapore) Geylang International
Nurdiansyah 13', 17', 89'; Ali Garwan 16'		Steven Choo 30'

18 June 1989

Kuala Lumpur FA (Malaysia)	4–2	(Singapore) Geylang International
Hashim Marman 30', 45'; K. Kannan 48', 52'		Tay Peng Kee 35', 56'

18 June 1989

Pelita Jaya (Indonesia)	3–0	(Philippines) Philippine Air Force

=== Group 6 ===
Pos	Team	Pld	W	D	L	GF	GA	GD	Pts	Qualification
1	(China) Liaoning (H)	3	2	1	0	7	2	+5	5	Qualify to Group stage
2	(Japan) Nissan Yokohama	3	2	0	1	11	1	+10	4	Qualify to Group stage
3	(North Korea) Chadongcha	3	1	1	1	3	3	0	3	
4	(Macau) Hap Kuan	3	0	0	3	1	16	−15	0	

Source: RSSSF
(H) Hosts

Played in Shenyang, China

20 August 1989

Liaoning (China)	1–0	(Japan) Nissan Yokohama

20 August 1989

Chadongcha (North Korea)	2–0	(Macau) Hap Kuan

22 August 1989

Nissan Yokohama (Japan)	9–0	(Macau) Hap Kuan

22 August 1989

Liaoning (China)	1–1	(North Korea) Chadongcha

24 August 1989

Liaoning (China)	5–1	(Macau) Hap Kuan

24 August 1989

Nissan Yokohama (Japan)	2–0	(North Korea) Chadongcha

== Group stage ==
Al Deffatain, Muharraq Club and Al Arabi all withdrew

=== Group A ===
Pos	Team	Pld	W	D	L	GF	GA	GD	Pts	Qualification
1	(Japan) Nissan Yokohama	2	2	0	0	3	1	+2	4	Advance to Final
2	(Malaysia) Kuala Lumpur FA (H)	2	1	0	1	3	2	+1	2	
3	(Oman) Fanja	2	0	0	2	0	3	−3	0	

Source: RSSSF
(H) Hosts

Played in Kuala Lumpur, Malaysia

Match 1

Nissan Yokohama (Japan)	2–1	(Malaysia) Kuala Lumpur FA

Match 2

Kuala Lumpur FA (Malaysia)	2–0	(Oman) Fanja

Match 3

Nissan Yokohama (Japan)	1–0	(Oman) Fanja

=== Group B ===
Pos	Team	Pld	W	D	L	GF	GA	GD	Pts	Qualification
1	(China) Liaoning	3	2	1	0	3	0	+3	5	Advance to Final
2	(Iraq) Al Rasheed	3	1	2	0	6	1	+5	4	
3	(Iran) Shahin Ahvaz	3	1	0	2	2	7	−5	2	
4	(Indonesia) Pelita Jaya (H)	3	0	1	2	1	4	−3	1	

Source: RSSSF
(H) Hosts

Played in Jakarta, Indonesia

Match 1

Liaoning (China)	0–0	(Iraq) Al Rasheed

Match 2

Liaoning (China)	2–0	(Iran) Shahin Ahvaz

Match 3

Liaoning (China)	1–0	(Indonesia) Pelita Jaya

Match 4

Al Rasheed (Iraq)	5–0	(Iran) Shahin Ahvaz

Match 5

Al Rasheed (Iraq)	1–1	(Indonesia) Pelita Jaya

Match 6

Shahin Ahvaz (Iran)	2–0	(Indonesia) Pelita Jaya

== Final ==
Team 1	Agg.	Team 2	1st leg	2nd leg
Liaoning (China)	3–2	(Japan) Nissan Yokohama	2–1	1–1

22 April 1990

Nissan Yokohama (Japan)	1–2	(China) Liaoning

Mitsuzawa Stadium, Yokohama, Japan

29 April 1990

Liaoning (China)	1–1	(Japan) Nissan Yokohama
