= 1991–92 Dhaka First Division Football League =

18th season of top-tier football league in Bangladesh

Dhaka First Division League
- Season: 1991–92
- Dates: 10 January – 7 June 1992
- Champions: Dhaka Abahani (8th title)
- Relegated: Police; BJMC
- Asian Club Championship: Dhaka Abahani
- Asian Cup Winners' Cup: Mohammedan
- Matches: 190
- Goals: 405 (2.13 per match)
- Top goalscorer: 17; Azamat Abduraimov (Mohammedan)

The 1991–92 Dhaka First Division League, also known as the STAR First Division Football League for sponsorship reasons, was the 18th season of the top-tier football league in Bangladesh and the 41st overall season of the First Division following the partition of India. A total of 20 clubs participated in the league which began on 10 January and concluded on 7 June 1992. The league champions Dhaka Abahani qualified for the 1993–94 Asian Club Championship.

This was also the final season of the First Division as the country's top-tier league. The top ten teams qualified for the inaugural Premier Division in the following year, while the clubs that finished 11th–18th, together with the top two teams from the 1991–92 Second Division, competed in the First Division, which became the second-tier from 1993 onward.

== Venue ==
The Dhaka Stadium and Mirpur Stadium in Dhaka were the venues used for the tournament.

Location	Name	Capacity	Image	Notes
Dhaka	Dacca Stadium	55,000		
Dhaka	Mirpur Stadium	25,000		

== League table ==
Pos	Team	Pld	W	D	L	GF	GA	GD	Pts	Qualification or relegation
1	Dhaka Abahani (C)	19	18	1	0	53	9	+44	37	Qualification for the 1993–94 Asian Club Championship and qualification for the 1993 Dhaka Premier Division League
2	Mohammedan	19	16	1	2	50	7	+43	33	Qualification for the 1993–94 Asian Cup Winners' Cup and qualification for the 1993 Dhaka Premier Division League (Note: Qualified for the 1993–94 Asian Cup Winners' Cup as champions of the 1993 DMFA Cup)
3	Brothers Union	19	12	3	4	31	15	+16	27	Qualification for the 1993 Dhaka Premier Division League
4	Arambagh	19	7	8	4	18	17	+1	22	Qualification for the 1993 Dhaka Premier Division League
5	Rahmatganj	19	9	3	7	26	13	+13	21	Qualification for the 1993 Dhaka Premier Division League
6	Agrani Bank	19	4	12	3	15	12	+3	20	Qualification for the 1993 Dhaka Premier Division League
7	Victoria	19	7	6	6	16	14	+2	20	Qualification for the 1993 Dhaka Premier Division League
8	Wari	19	4	12	3	18	19	−1	20	Qualification for the 1993 Dhaka Premier Division League
9	Muktijoddha	19	6	8	5	20	24	−4	20	Qualification for the 1993 Dhaka Premier Division League
10	PWD	19	7	5	7	23	25	−2	19	Qualification for the 1993 Dhaka Premier Division League
11	Fakirerpool	19	6	5	8	16	21	−5	17	
12	Farashganj	19	4	8	7	11	20	−9	16	
13	Dhanmondi	19	3	10	6	12	22	−10	16	
14	Wanderers	19	3	9	7	14	18	−4	15	
15	BRTC	19	2	11	6	15	22	−7	15	
16	Eskaton	19	2	11	6	16	24	−8	15	
17	Adamjee	19	3	9	7	15	27	−12	15	
18	Sadharan Bima	19	4	7	8	17	30	−13	15	
19	Police (R)	19	3	8	8	13	25	−12	14	Relegation to the 1993 Dhaka Second Division League
20	BJMC (R)	19	0	3	16	6	41	−35	3	Relegation to the 1993 Dhaka Second Division League

Source: RSSSF
Rules for classification: 1) Points; 2) Goal difference; 3) Goals scored
(C) Champions; (R) Relegated

== Top goalscorers ==
Rank	Player	Club	Goals
1	(Uzbekistan) Azamat Abduraimov	Mohammedan	17
2	(Bangladesh) Sheikh Mohammad Aslam	Dhaka Abahani	12
2	(Bangladesh) A.K.M. Masudur Rahman	Muktijoddha	12
4	(Bangladesh) Rizvi Karim Rumi	Dhaka Abahani	9
4	(Bangladesh) Mamun Joarder	Dhaka Abahani	9
6	(Bangladesh) Rumman Bin Wali Sabbir	Mohammedan	8
7	(Bangladesh) Golam Gauss	Dhaka Abahani	7
7	(Bangladesh) Mosharaf Hossain Tutul	Wari	7
9	(Bangladesh) Md Jewel	PWD	6
9	(Bangladesh) Mostakim Wazed	Dhaka Wanderers	6

== See also ==
- 1991 Federation Cup
- 1991 BTC Club Cup
