= Rashid Ahmed (footballer) =

Bangladeshi footballer (1916–1995)

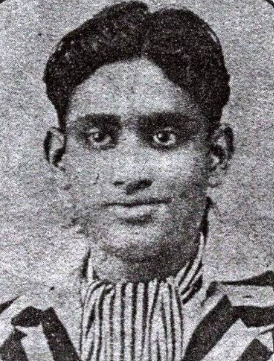
- Rashid during his playing days

Personal information
- Full name: Rashid Ahmed
- Date of birth: 1 January 1916
- Place of birth: Comilla, British India
- Date of death: August 1995 (aged 79)
- Place of death: Dhaka, Bangladesh
- Positions: Outside left; inside left

Senior career*
Years	Team	Apps	(Gls)
1933–1936	Kalighat FC		
1936–1937	Kolkata Mohammedan		
- * Club domestic league appearances and goals

Rashid Ahmed (Bengali: রশিদ আহমেদ; 1 January 1916 – 1995), also known as Rashid Jr., was a Bangladeshi football player and administrator who played for Kolkata Mohammedan prior to the Partition of India.

== Early life ==
Born in Comilla, Rashid studied at the Islamia School, Chittagong, where he gained attention for his athletic abilities. He then attended Aligarh Muslim University.

During his time at Aligarh, he played cricket, field hockey, and football, and represented the university in multiple sports. He would later pursue higher studies at Punjab University, in Lahore.

== Playing career ==
Rashid made his debut with Kalighat Club against East Bengal.

In 1936, Rashid joined Kolkata Mohammedan, after Rashid Sr. injured his shin-bone. He filled in for the striker position for rest of the matches that the club played. Winning the league that season, Rashid also scored in the third replayed match of the 1936 IFA Shield final against Calcutta FC. On 25 November 1937, Rashid represented Tipperah XI in an exhibition match against the visiting Islington Corinthians. The match, held in Comilla, ended in a 3–0 defeat for the home side. Notably, the Tipperah XI included several players from the Calcutta Football League, all hailing from the district. Rashid left Mohammedan in 1937, immigrating to Dundee, Scotland.

== Post-retirement ==
After graduating in 1937, Rashid Ahmed left competitive professional football and pursued his studies in jute technology. He earned a first-class qualification and worked for a British company for a while before joining the Calcutta Civil Supply Department. Rashid also organized the Circus Sporting Club.

Following the Partition of India, he played an important role in developing football in East Pakistan. He helped organise the East Pakistan Gymkhana team with the support of Habibullah Bahar Chowdhury. The Gymkhana club went on to become the first Muslim club to win the Dhaka First Division Football League in 1949.

In 1950, Ahmed organised the first East Pakistan football team to tour Quetta. In 1965, he was also included for the East Pakistan Sports Federation coaching committee as an honorary instructor alongside Mohammad Shahjahan.

In 1970, Ahmed was re-elected as the president of the Narayanganj Chamber of Commerce & Industry for the second time.

== Personal life ==
Rashid Ahmed graduated with a B.A. and Economics degree.

== Honours ==
Mohammedan Sporting

- Calcutta Football League:
  - Winners (2): 1936, 1937
- IFA Shield:
  - Winners (1): 1936

=== Individual ===
- 1980 − National Sports Awards.
