= Illias Uddin Ahmed =

Bangladeshi footballer (1926–1987)

- Illias post-retirement

Personal information
- Full name: Illias Uddin Ahmed
- Date of birth: 7 January 1926
- Place of birth: Mymensingh, Bengal, British India
- Date of death: 30 October 1987 (aged 61)
- Place of death: Mymensingh, Bangladesh
- Positions: Center-half; right-half

Senior career*
| Years | Team | Apps | (Gls) |
| 1940–?? | Mymensingh Mohammedan | | |
| 1946–1947 | Kolkata Mohammedan | | |
| 1949 | EP Gymkhana | | |
| 1950–1954 | Victoria SC | | |
- * Club domestic league appearances and goals

Illias Uddin Ahmed (Bengali: ইলিয়াস উদ্দিন আহমেদ; 7 January 1926 – 30 October 1987) was a footballer from East Bengal, now Bangladesh who played as a centre-half. He also played hockey, tennis and cricket, and was also a sports administrator.

== Early life ==
Illias was born on 7 January 1926 in Mymensingh, Bengal, British India. He completed his matriculation examination at Mymensingh Zilla School and his intermediate examinations at Ananda Mohan College in 1942 and 1944, respectively. He participated in the Lila Devi Shield with both institutions. His father, Abbas Ali Ahmed, served as the general secretary of Mymensingh Mohammedan for 17 years.

== Football career ==
In 1940, while still a Class IX student at Mymensingh Zilla School, Illias began playing senior football in the First Division of the Mymensingh Football Association League with Mymensingh Mohammedan. His breakthrough came in 1941, when he scored from a 22-yard shot against Panditpara A.C. in the championship play-off match, helping his team secure a 3–2 victory. Notably, Panditpara had won the First Division title of Mymensingh for 18 consecutive years from 1922 to 1939. Illias also represented Mohammedan in the Cooch Behar Cup and the Ronaldshay Shield in Calcutta and Dhaka, respectively.

In 1945, playing as a center-half, he captained the Mymensingh District XI to a 3–2 victory in an exhibition match against the visiting East Bengal Club, at the time the holders of the Calcutta Football League First Division and the IFA Shield. The following year, he joined Kolkata Mohammedan, a club he represented as a right-half until the partition of India. Following partition, Illias moved to East Pakistan, and won the Dhaka First Division Football League with East Pakistan Gymkhana in 1949. He then represented Victoria Sporting Club in Dhaka for the following 5 years.

Illias captained Dhaka Division and Dhaka University in the Independence Day Football Tournament in 1949 and 1950, respectively. In 1951 and 1954, he captained Mymensingh District to the Inter-District Football Tournament title. In 1954, he played for the East Pakistan in the National Football Championship in Lahore.

== Other sports ==
Besides football, Illias played tennis, hockey, and cricket. During the 1944–45 academic year, he captained the cricket team of Islamia College and received the Blue certificate as the institution's best sportsman; in the same period, he became college champion in badminton in both singles and doubles, represented the college in volleyball and table tennis, and finished as runner-up in the college annual athletics meet. He later secured the Doubles Championship in tennis at Dhaka University in 1951 and participated in the East Pakistan Lawn Tennis Championship in 1952–53 with Md. Nasim as his partner. During a visit to the United States in 1955, he played matches against national-level champions. He also played hockey for Kolkata Mohammedan and Victoria Sporting Club.

== Personal life and sports administration ==
Illias graduated with honours in history from Islamia College in Calcutta in 1947 and later studied law at Dhaka University. In 1953, he was selected by the Education Directorate of the Government of East Pakistan for overseas training in physical education and was sent to the United States, where he remained for two years. He earned a Diploma Certificate in Physical Education under the F.O.A. programme between January and June 1955, and subsequently obtained a bachelor's degree in Physical Education from the University of Oregon in Eugene after completing two years of theoretical and practical training from July 1955 to June 1957. His studies in the United States were supported by a scholarship from The Asia Foundation of San Francisco, California.

Following his return to East Pakistan, Illias served in several key administrative and coaching roles in regional and national sports bodies. He was Honorary Secretary of the East Pakistan Sportsmen's Association, a member of the governing body of the East Pakistan Sports Federation (EPSF), and Joint Secretary of the Inter-University Sports Board of Pakistan during 1958–60 and again in 1961. He also held the post of Honorary Secretary of the Rajshahi Divisional Sports Association and served as Secretary of the Inter-University Sports Board in 1967; during this tenure, he led the Pakistan delegation in swimming and tennis as Chief de Mission at the World Universiade Games in Tokyo, Japan. In addition, Illias acted as Honorary Chief Coach at the National Football Coaching Programme in Dhaka under the auspices of the Pakistan Sports Control Board in 1958 and 1961, later becoming Chairman of the EPSF Coaching Committee. From July 1965, he served as Director of Physical Education at East Pakistan Agricultural University in Mymensingh. In 1977, was the torchbearer for the 5th Bangladesh National Athletics held in Mymensingh.

== Death ==
Illias died on 30 October 1987.

== Honours ==
Mymensingh Mohammedan

- Mymensingh First Division League: 1941

EP Gymkhana

- Dhaka First Division League: 1949

Mymensingh District

- Inter-District Football Tournament: 1951, 1954
