= 1993 Dhaka Premier Division Football League =

Dhaka Premier Division League
- Season: 1993
- Dates: 11 June – 26 September 1993
- Champions: Mohammedan
- Relegated: Rahmatganj; Victoria
- Matches: 91
- Goals: 190 (2.09 per match)
- Top goalscorer: 13 goals Oleg Zhivotnikov (Mohammedan)

The 1993 Dhaka Premier Division League, also known as the Star Football League due to sponsorship from BTC, was the 19th season of the top-tier football league in Bangladesh and the 1st season of the Premier Division, following its succession from the First Division as the top-tier. A total of ten teams participated in the league which ran from 11 June to 26 September 1993.

== Venue ==
The Dhaka Stadium in Dhaka was the main venue for the league.

Dhaka	1993 Dhaka Premier Division Football League is located in Bangladesh
Dhaka Stadium	1993 Dhaka Premier Division Football League is located in Bangladesh
Capacity: 36,000	1993 Dhaka Premier Division Football League is located in Bangladesh

== League table ==
Pos	Team	Pld	W	D	L	GF	GA	GD	Pts	Qualification or relegation
1	Mohammedan (C)	18	14	2	2	48	13	+35	30	
2	Dhaka Abahani	18	12	5	1	36	10	+26	29	
3	Brothers Union	18	8	7	3	28	17	+11	23	
4	Agrani Bank	18	2	13	3	12	17	−5	17	
5	Muktijoddha Sangsad	18	2	11	5	11	15	−4	15	
6	Arambagh	18	4	6	8	13	30	−17	14	
7	PWD	18	2	10	6	10	16	−6	14	
8	Wari Club	18	3	7	8	12	21	−9	13	Qualification for the Relegation playoff (Note: A relegation playoff match was played as the Dhaka Metropolition Football Committee did not use goal difference to differentiate positions)
9	Rahmatganj	18	4	5	9	12	25	−13	13	Qualification for the Relegation playoff
10	Victoria (R)	18	3	6	9	7	25	−18	12	Relegation to the 1994 First Division League

Source: RSSSF
Rules for classification: 1) Points; 2) Goal difference; 3) Goals scored;
(C) Champions; (R) Relegated

== Relegation playoff ==
26 September 1993

Wari Club	1–0	Rahmatganj
Mokbul 53'

Hockey Stadium
Referee: Nik Ahmed

== Top scorers ==
Rank	Scorer	Club	Goals
1	(Russia) Oleg Zhivotnikov	Mohammedan	13
2	(Bangladesh) Imtiaz Ahmed Nakib	Mohammedan	10
3	(Bangladesh) Rizvi Karim Rumi	Dhaka Abahani	9
4	(Bangladesh) Golam Gauss	Dhaka Abahani	7
4	(Bangladesh) Sheikh Mohammad Aslam	Mohammedan	7
4	(Bangladesh) Kaiser Hamid	Mohammedan	7
4	(Bangladesh) Mizanur Rahman Mizan	Brothers Union	7
8	(Bangladesh) Mamun Joarder	Dhaka Abahani	5
8	(Russia) Aleksandr Dozmorov	Dhaka Abahani	5
8	(Bangladesh) Mosharaf Hossain Tutul	Wari Club	5
8	(Bangladesh) Chopol	Muktijoddha Sangad	5
