= Ranjit Saha =

Bangladeshi footballer

Personal information
- Full name: Ranjit Kumar Saha
- Date of birth: 15 January 1964 (age 62)
- Place of birth: Cumilla, East Pakistan (present-day Bangladesh)
- Height: 1.80 m (5 ft 11 in)
- Positions: Center-back; right-back

Senior career*
Years	Team	Apps	(Gls)
1981–1982	Dhanmondi Club		
1983–1987	Mohammedan		
1988–1992	Dhaka Abahani		

International career
1984	Bangladesh U19		
1983–1987	Bangladesh		
Medal record
Representing Bangladesh
South Asian Games
Silver medal – second place	1985
- * Club domestic league appearances and goals

Ranjit Saha (Bengali: রনজিত সাহা; 15 January 1964) is a retired Bangladeshi football player who played as either a center-back or right-back. He represented the Bangladesh national football team between 1983 and 1987.

== Early life ==
Ranjit Kumar Saha was born in Cumilla, Bangladesh, on 15 January 1964. His father Suresh Chandra Saha was the manager of a renowned pharmaceutical company, Comilla Sharma Chemical. His father's death plunged him into destitute when he was in eighth grade and in order to support his family, Ranjit had to work in a clothing shop while also continuing his studies.

== Club career ==
=== Early career ===
Ranjit's career began with school football in Cumilla which caught the attention of Dhanmondi Club coach Md Mohsin, in 1981. However, before making his First Division League debut, he represented Arambagh KS as a guest player at the ANFA Cup, in Nepal. With Arambagh finishing the tournament as runner-up, coach Ashraf Chowdhury was desperate to lure Ranjit to the club on a permanent basis. However, he returned to Dhanmondi Club and spent two seasons at the club. Towards the end of 1982, Ranjit again partook in the ANFA Cup, this time as a guest player for Mohammedan SC.

=== Mohammedan ===
In 1983, Ranjit joined Mohammedan SC permanently, during a period when the Dhaka Derby against Dhaka Abahani was the center of Bangladeshi sports. From 1983 until 1985, he was part of three league runner-up sides. In 1986, Ranjit won his first league title and marshalled the defense alongside Kaiser Hamid, as the Black and Whites defeated Abahani 2–0 in the title deciding game, before going onto win 4–2 against Dhaka Wanderers in the last Super League game.

In 1987, Ranjit was appointed club captain and led them to the domestic double. He began the season by lifting the Federation Cup and in the Super League round of the First Division, Mohammedan defeated Abahani 3–2, with Khurshid Alam Babul scoring the late winner from Ranjit's cross. With both clubs on equal points, and the return play-off game ending as a stalemate, the players alongside the club officials agreed upon being crowned joint-champions. However, the Bangladesh Football Federation reacted by suspending Ranjit alongside Abahani captain Sheikh Mohammad Aslam for a year, and also arranged a second playoff match behind closed doors, at the Army Stadium. Mohammedan ended up winning the game 2–0.

=== Dhaka Abahani ===
In 1988, he transferred to Dhaka Abahani. His most successful season at Abahani came in 1989, as he won the league title and was also part of the team which defeated Salgaocar FC, in the final of India's Sait Nagjee Trophy. Aside from football in Dhaka, Ranjit represented Cumilla District in the Sher-e-Bangla Cup, while in 1989 he won the Chittagong Football League with Sicustom. He retired after securing the 1992 First Division League title with Abahani.

== International career ==
In 1982, Ranjit represented the Bangladesh Green team in the President's Gold Cup, and the following year, in the same tournament, he was part of the main national team, participating as Bangladesh Red. In 1984, he participated in the 1985 AFC Youth Championship qualifiers with the Bangladesh U19 team.

The following year, coach, Kazi Salahuddin, included him in the squad for the 1985 South Asian Games held in Dhaka. The team won silver, losing to India on penalties in the final. Ranjit also represented Bangladesh at the 1986 Asian Games. In the same year, he played for Mohammedan SC at Nepal's Panchayat Silver Jubilee Cup, and according to World Football Elo Ratings, Mohammedan played the tournament as the Bangladesh national team. Ranjit also represented the Bangladesh White team, which included players from Mohammedan, at the 1987 President's Gold Cup, held in Dhaka. However, due to the ban he earned during the Dhaka Derby the same year, Ranjit was not able to join the team for the 1987 South Asian Games.

== Honours ==
Mohammedan SC

- Dhaka First Division League: 1986, 1987
- Federation Cup: 1983, 1987

Abahani Limited Dhaka

- Dhaka First Division League: 1989–90, 1992
- Independence Cup: 1990
- Azmiri Begum Gold Cup: 1990
- Sait Nagjee Trophy: 1989
- Federation Cup: 1988
- BTC Clubs Cup: 1991
- DMFA Cup: 1984

Bangladesh

- South Asian Games Silver medal: 1985
