= Abdul Khaleque (footballer) =

Pakistani former footballer

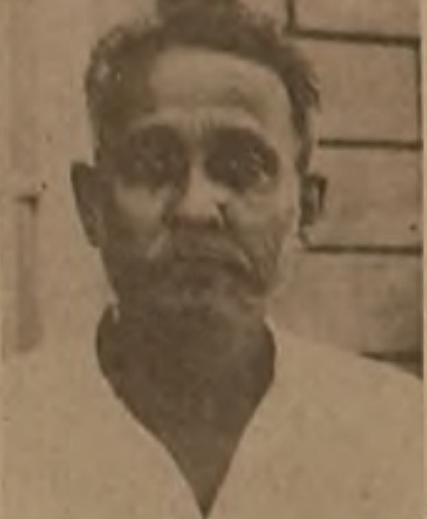
- Khaleque in 1969

Personal information
- Full name: Abdul Khaleque
- Date of birth: 1911
- Place of birth: Silchar, Cachar district, Assam, British India
- Date of death: Unknown
- Position: Half-back

Senior career*
Years	Team	Apps	(Gls)
1933–1937	Bhawanipore Club		
1938–1939	East Bengal		
1940s	Aryan		
1948	Mohammedan		
1949	EP Gymkhana		
- * Club domestic league appearances and goals

Abdul Khaleque, alternatively spelled as Abdul Khalque, was a former association footballer, who played as a half-back, notably, Khaleque was a part of the Mohammedan Sporting in 1948, which won the Calcutta Football League without losing once.

== Early life ==
Khaleque was born in 1911, in Silchar, of the Cachar district, Assam, of then British India. He would first be noticed and was spotted for his talent playing in local school football tournaments.

== Playing career ==
In 1933, Khaleque joined Bhawanipore Club, playing for them for four years, before transferring to East Bengal, where he played from 1938 to 1939. He also played for Aryans, and for Albert David club.

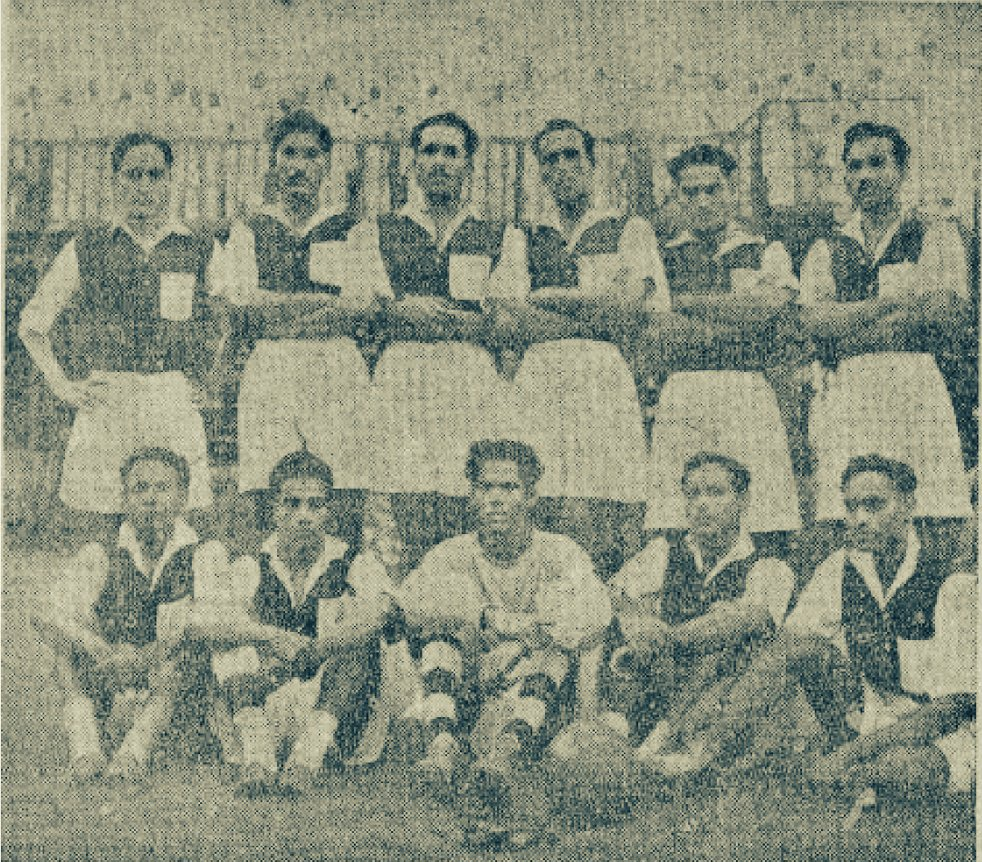
Khaleque (sitting on ground, extreme left) with Mohammedan Sporting in 1948.

Afterwards, he was recruited to play for Mohammedan Sporting in 1948. Where he played an influential role in the team, helping them become the first indian time to win the Calcutta Football League without losing once, playing 24 matches, winning 20 and drawing the rest four.

After the partition, Khaleque moved to Pakistan, continuing his football career with EP Gymkhana, helping them with the league in his debut season, becoming the first Muslim team to ever win the Dhaka First Division League.

== Later life ==
Following retirement from football, Khaleque faced extreme poverty.

== Honours ==
Mohammedan

- Calcutta First Division League: 1948

EP Gymkhana

- Dhaka First Division League: 1949
