= 1986 Dhaka First Division Football League =

14th season of top-tier football league in Bangladesh

Dhaka First Division League
- Season: 1986
- Dates: May 23 — 26 November 1986
- Champions: Mohammedan (13th title)
- Relegated: East End
- Asian Club Championship: Mohammedan
- Matches: 154
- Goals: 308 (2 per match)
- Top goalscorer: 20; Sheikh Mohammad Aslam (Dhaka Abahani)

The 1986 Dhaka First Division League was the 14th season of the top-tier football league in Bangladesh and the 37th overall season of the First Division following the partition of India. A total of 16 teams participated in the league, which began on 23 May and concluded on 26 November 1986. The league champions Mohammedan qualified for the 1987 Asian Club Championship.

== Venue ==
The Dhaka Stadium in Dhaka was the main venue for the league.

Dhaka	1986 Dhaka First Division Football League is located in Bangladesh
Dhaka Stadium	1986 Dhaka First Division Football League is located in Bangladesh
Capacity: 36,000	1986 Dhaka First Division Football League is located in Bangladesh

== Regular season ==
Pos	Team	Pld	W	D	L	GF	GA	GD	Pts	Qualification or relegation
1	Mohammedan	15	13	2	0	25	6	+19	28	Qualification for the Super League
2	Dhaka Abahani	15	13	1	1	39	4	+35	27	Qualification for the Super League
3	Brothers Union	15	11	2	2	21	7	+14	24	Qualification for the Super League
4	Wanderers	15	5	8	2	15	10	+5	18	Qualification for the Super League
5	Arambagh	15	6	4	5	15	11	+4	16	Qualification for the Super League
6	Muktijoddha	15	6	3	6	21	13	+8	15	Qualification for the Super League
7	Mirpur Chalantika	15	6	3	6	12	19	−7	15	Qualification for the Super League
8	Rahmatganj	15	5	5	5	17	21	−4	15	Qualification for the Super League
9	BRTC	15	4	4	7	13	18	−5	12	
10	Dhanmondi	15	5	1	9	14	20	−6	11	
11	Sadharan Bima	15	4	4	7	9	15	−6	12	
12	Wari	15	4	4	7	9	23	−14	12	
13	Victoria	15	3	6	6	9	13	−4	12	Qualification for the Relegation League
14	PWD	15	2	6	7	8	19	−11	10	Qualification for the Relegation League
15	Farashganj	15	2	2	11	9	22	−13	6	Qualification for the Relegation League
16	East End	15	1	5	9	9	24	−15	7	Qualification for the Relegation League

Rules for classification: 1) Points; 2) Goal difference; 3) Goals scored;

== Playoff phase ==
NB: Points from the regular phase were carried over into both the Super League and Relegation League.

=== Relegation League ===
Pos	Team	Pld	W	D	L	GF	GA	GD	Pts	Qualification or relegation
1	PWD	18	3	7	8	10	20	−10	16	
2	Victoria SC	18	3	6	9	9	17	−8	15	
3	Farashganj SC	18	4	3	11	12	23	−11	15	
4	East End Club (R)	18	2	7	9	11	25	−14	13	Relegated to the 1987 Second Division League

Source: RSSSF
Rules for classification: 1) Points; 2) Goal difference; 3) Goals scored;
(R) Relegated

=== Super League ===
Pos	Team	Pld	W	D	L	GF	GA	GD	Pts	
1	Mohammedan (C)	22	18	4	0	37	9	+28	58	Qualification for the 1987 Asian Club Championship
2	Dhaka Abahani	22	18	2	2	49	8	+41	56	
3	Brothers Union	22	14	5	3	32	11	+21	47	
4	Muktijoddha	22	9	3	10	26	23	+3	30	
5	Arambagh	22	8	5	9	19	20	−1	29	
6	Wanderers	22	6	10	6	21	21	0	28	
7	Rahmatganj	22	7	7	8	23	28	−5	28	
8	Mirpur Chalantika	22	7	4	11	14	27	−13	25	

Source: RSSSF
Rules for classification: 1) Points; 2) Goal difference; 3) Goals scored;
(C) Champions
