= Alauddin Khan (footballer) =

Bangladeshi footballer

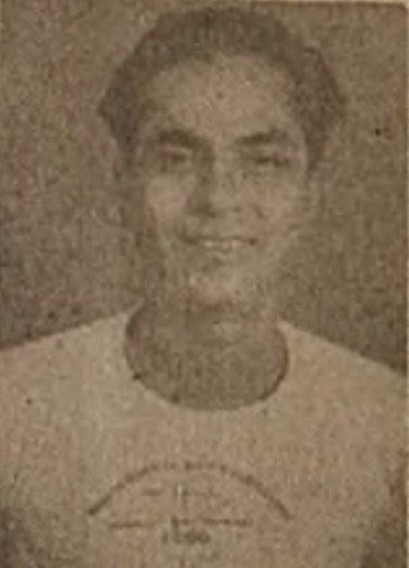
- Khan in 1969

Personal information
- Full name: Alauddin Khan
- Date of birth: 1918
- Place of birth: Narayanganj, Bengal, British India (present-day Bangladesh)
- Date of death: 11 January 2001 (aged 82)
- Place of death: Narayanganj, Bangladesh
- Position: Left winger

Senior career*
Years	Team	Apps	(Gls)
1937	Chittagong XI		
1938	Chittagong Police		
1941	Bonedi Sporting Union		
1942–1943	East Bengal		
1943–1947	Eastern Railway		
1948	Wari Club		
1949	EP Gymkhana		
1950–1958	EB Railway		
1953–1954	Fire Service		

International career
1943	India XI		

Managerial career
- Railway Pioneers
- * Club domestic league appearances and goals

Alauddin Khan (Bengali: আলাউদ্দিন খান; 1918– 11 January 2001) was a Bangladeshi football player and coach.

== Early life ==
Khan was born in No. 179 Paikpara, Narayanganj Sadar Upazila of Narayanganj, Bengal in 1918.

== Club career ==
=== Early career ===
Khan featured for Minerva Club in the Narayanganj First Division Football League against IGN & RSN Club while still a school student. In 1936, he represented Dhaka Sports Association XI (DSA XI) in a match against the touring Kolkata Mohammedan. On 26 November 1937, he played in an exhibition match for Chittagong XI against the touring Islington Corinthians at the Chittagong Police Ground, where his team lost 1–0 in front of a crowd of 77,000 spectators.

In 1938, Alauddin represented Chittagong Police Club in an exhibition match against the Arakan Athletics Association team in Arakan (now Burma). In the same year, he was awarded the Best Player Award by Chittagong Police Athletics Association. He played for the Chittagong Football Association from 1939 to 1940.

=== West Bengal ===
In 1941, Alauddin joined Bonedi Sporting Union in the Calcutta First Division Football League. In 1942 and 1943, he trained with East Bengal FC as a reserve player. In 1943, he became employed in the Eastern Bengal Railway and in the following year switched to the Bengal and Assam Railway. In 1944, he won the IFA Shield with Eastern Railway FC, playing an important role in the 2–0 victory against East Bengal Club in the final. In the following year, Alauddin represented the Bengal football team during their 1945–46 Santosh Trophy triumph. He remained with Eastern Railway FC, playing under the coaching of Tejes Bagha Shome from Kishoreganj until the Partition of India.

=== East Bengal ===
Following the partition, Alauddin joined Wari Club in the Dhaka First Division Football League. In 1949, he won the First Division League title with EP Gymkhana. In the same year, he captained East Bengal Governor's XI over two exhibition matches against West Bengal Governor's XI held on 19 and 20 September at the DSA Ground in Dhaka. His team lost both matches 1–4 and 0–1, respectively. In 1950, he joined Eastern Bengal Railway, playing in both Chittagong and Dhaka, he notably won the Ronaldshay Shield in both 1951 and 1952. He represented the East Pakistan football team in the National Football Championship, held in Quetta in 1950, and also played against IFA XI (Calcutta) in Dhaka in 1953. In the 1952 National Football Championship held in Dhaka, Khan featured for Combined Railways.

He played for Fire Service AC in Dhaka until 1954 and Naraynganj's Mohsin Club until 1958. In 1954, he captained Eastern Bengal Railway in a friendly match against Royal Pakistan Air Force in Chittagong. He retired after representing Dhaka Mohammedan in the 1958 Aga Khan Gold Cup in Dhaka.

== International career ==
In 1943, he represented the Indian Football Association in a senior international match against the Europeans XI, a team composed of British players, losing 0–1.

== Post-retirement ==
In 1957, Khan, alongside Syed Abdus Samad, began coaching college and university students in Dhaka as part of the Pakistan Sports Control Board's Football Scheme. In 1966, he became a Level 1 football referee and served as the general secretary of Railway Blues Club from 1967 to 1976. That same year, he coached Railway Pioneers to the Second Division title, earning promotion to the First Division. He later served as joint secretary of the Narayanganj Sports Association. In 1978, he received the National Sports Awards in recognition of his contributions to the regions football.

== Death ==
On 11 January 2001, Khan died in his residence in Paikpara, Narayanganj, Bangladesh.

The Gymkhana Field in Narayanganj was renamed as Alauddin Khan Stadium in his memory.

== Honours ==
=== Player ===
Eastern Railway FC

- IFA Shield: 1944

Bengal

- Santosh Trophy: 1945–46

East Pakistan Gymkhana

- Dhaka First Division League: 1949

East Bengal Railway

- Ronaldshay Shield: 1951, 1952

=== Manager ===
Railway Pioneers

- Dhaka Second Division League: 1966

=== Individual ===
- National Sports Awards: 1978
