= Mostafa Hossain Mukul =

Bangladeshi footballer

Personal information
- Full name: Mostafa Hossain Mukul
- Date of birth: 12 November 1957 (age 68)
- Place of birth: Chandpur, East Bengal, Pakistan (present-day Bangladesh)
- Height: 1.78 m (5 ft 10 in)
- Positions: Full-back; center-back

Senior career*
Years	Team	Apps	(Gls)
1975–1977	PWD SC		
1978–1982	Team BJMC		
1983	Brothers Union		
1984–1985	Muktijoddha Sangsad		
1986–1989	BRTC SC		
1989–1990	Team BJMC		

International career
1978	Bangladesh U19		
1978–1981	Bangladesh		
- * Club domestic league appearances and goals

Mostafa Hossain Mukul (Bengali: মোস্তফা হোসাইন মুকুল; born 12 November 1957) is a retired Bangladeshi footballer who played as a defender.

== Club career ==
Mukul was signed by Dhaka First Division League outfit PWD Sports Club after winning the Inter-College Football Championship with Chandpur Government College in 1973. He served as club captain in 1977 before moving joining Team BJMC the following season. He captained BJMC to the club's fifth league title in 1979. Mukul represented Gopibagh-based, Brothers Union, in 1983 and also served as club captain of Muktijoddha Sangsad KC in 1985.

== International career ==
Mukul represented the Bangladesh U19 team at the 1978 AFC Youth Championship held in Dhaka. In the same year, Werner Bickelhaupt, who served as head coach of both the U20 team and the Bangladesh national team, included Mukul in 1978 Asian Games final squad. He also participated in the 1980 AFC Asian Cup in Kuwait. In 1981, he was part of the Bangladesh Green team (senior national team) at the first edition of the Bangladesh President's Gold Cup.

== Personal life ==
Following his retirement, he moved to the US with his wife and 2 children.

== Honours ==
Team BJMC

- Dhaka First Division League: 1979

Individual

- Dhaka University Blue: 1979–80

== Bibliography ==
- Dulal, Mahmud (2020). খেলার মাঠে মুক্তিযুদ্ধ (transl. Liberation war in the playground) (in Bengali). Bishhoshahitto Bhobon. ISBN 978-984-8218-31-0.
