= Azamat Abduraimov =

Uzbek professional football player (born 1966)

- Azamat Abduraimov with his daughter Alia

Personal information
- Full name: Azamat Birodarovich Abduraimov
- Date of birth: 27 April 1966 (age 60)
- Place of birth: Tashkent, Uzbek SSR, Soviet Union
- Position: Forward

Senior career*
Years	Team	Apps	(Gls)
1983–1984	FShM Moscow	28	(1)
1984–1985	Spartak Moscow	0	(0)
1985	SKA Rostov-na-Donu	0	(0)
1986	CSKA Moskva	0	(0)
1987–1990	Pakhtakor	124	(25)
1990	Spartak Moscow	3	(0)
1991	Pamir Dushanbe	25	(4)
1991–1992	Mohammedan	12	(17)
1992–1993	Navbahor Namangan	16	(8)
1993	MHSK Tashkent	17	(10)
1994–1995	Pahang FA	28	(14)
1995	Navbahor Namangan	4	(1)
1995	Politotdel Tashkent	11	(2)
1995–1996	Al-Wahda Mecca	20	(10)
1996–1999	Pakhtakor	91	(37)
1999–2000	Salgaocar SC Goa		
2000	Pakhtakor	22	(5)
2001	Dustlik Tashkent	33	(13)

International career
1992–1997	Uzbekistan	22	(11)

Managerial career
- 2002–2003: NBU Osiyo
- 2004: Uzbekistan futsal team
- 2005: FC Ardus (futsal)
- 2009–2010: FK Samarqand-Dinamo
- 2012: Uzbekistan U-22
- 2012–2014: FK Andijan
- 2018–2020: Uzbekistan U-17
- * Club domestic league appearances and goals

Azamat Birodarovich Abduraimov (born 27 April 1966) is a former Uzbek professional football player, who represented Uzbekistan national football team on 22 occasions between 1992 and 1997.

== Early years ==
Azamat Abduraimov was born in Tashkent in 1966. His father, Berador Abduraimov, is the best Uzbek goals scorer in the 20th century and one of the best FC Pakhtakor Tashkent players ever. When Azamat was three years old, his father moved to Moscow to play for CSKA.

Azamat started his football career in Spartak Moskva football youth academy (ФШМ). Being in the Soviet Army, he was playing for SKA Rostov-na-Donu and CSKA Moskva.

== Personal life ==
Azamat is the father of Alia Azamat Ashkenazi, American screenwriter and director who co-wrote a soccer documentary "Misha" directed by Brian Song in which Azamat was featured as one of the characters.

== Playing career ==
=== Pakhtakor Tashkent ===
Most of honours were achieved by Azamat while he played for Pakhtakor. He joined Pakhtakor three times and spent more than seven seasons of his playing career there (scored more than 60 goals).

First time he was playing for Pakhtakor from 1987 until 1990 in Soviet First League, scored 25 times. He left Pakhtakor in the middle of 1990 season to join Spartak Moskva.

Next time he returned to Pakhtakor in 1996, and spent three seasons in the team, scored 37 times and won Uzbek League in 1998 and Uzbekistani Cup in 1997.

Last season Azamat played for Pakhtakor was 2000 when he was already 34.

=== Spartak Moskva ===
During 1990 Azamat was the bench player of Spartak Moskva, gaining only three first team appearances. He scored a lot for reserve team during that time, however, he couldn't achieve a first team place and left to Pamir Dushanbe.

=== Foreign countries ===
During his career, Azamat Abduraimov become one of the first Uzbekistani players who began playing in foreign countries. He played for different teams in 4 non-ex USSR countries (Bangladesh, Malaysia, Saudi Arabia, India). In 1992, during his time with Mohammedan SC, Azamat showcased one of the best goal to game ratio in Bangladesh domestic football history, scoring 17 goals in only 12 games. He was the top scorer in the Dhaka First Division League as Mohammedan finished runners-up. With National Football League (India) side Salgaocar SC, he won the prestigious Durand Cup in 1999.

== International career ==
Abduraimov made his international debut on 28 June 1992 against Turkmenistan in a 2–1 win match. He achieved 22 caps for Uzbekistan national football team as player. Most notable of his international appearances was at the 1994 Asian Games football tournament in Hiroshima, where the Uzbekistan team won the gold medal.

The most significant of his football career was the goal scored in the semifinal match at the Asian Games against South Korea. The decisive goal (South Korea lost to Uzbekistan 0:1) was considered The Best in the tournament, as well as the best and the "Golden Goal" in the history of Uzbek football.

Also, he played international futsal games as a member of Uzbekistan national futsal team at World 5's Futsal 2003 in Kuala Lumpur, and became a threat to team Japan, according to next year's Japanese futsal report of AFC Futsal Championship.

== Managing career ==
Azamat Abduraimov played his farewell match in 2002, which was the most incendiary sport show in Uzbekistan. In 2002–2003 season he was "playing coach" in NBU Osiyo (1st league). In 2003 played in Uzbekistan national futsal team at the Asian Championship in Indonesia. In 2004 season he worked as a head coach of Uzbekistan national futsal team, which was playing in the Asian Championship in Iran and Malaysia 2004 AFC Futsal Championship. Then in 2005 he spent some time managing Uzbek futsal club FC Ardus (gained Uzbek futsal championship title in 2005).

In 2006–2007 he was G.M. at the Native football foundation In 2006, he graduated from Russia High Coaches School.

On 28 October 2008 he was appointed as sports director in FC Bunyodkor. During 2009–2010 season he was the head coach of FK Samarqand-Dinamo. In 2009 Azamat ranked the third place in the ranking of the Football Coach of the Year in Uzbekistan. In 2010, he received a coaching PRO license.

In January 2012 he was appointed by the Football Federation as assistant coach of Uzbekistan U-22. On 22 August 2012 he signed a contract with FK Andijan as head coach of the club. On 18 June 2014 he resigned from his post as Andijan coach. On 4 February 2020 he resigned his post as head coach of Uzbekistan U-17.

== Honours ==
Pakhtakor

- Soviet First League Cup: 1988, 1989
- Uzbek League: 1998
- Uzbek Cup: 1997

Navbahor Namangan

- Uzbek Cup: 1992

Pahang FA

- Malaysian Super League: 1994

Al Wahda

- Saudi First Division: 1996

Salgaocar

- Durand Cup: 1999

Uzbekistan

- Asian Games: 1994

Individual

- 1991–92 − Dhaka First Division League Top-scorer (with 17 goals)
