= K. Kannan =

Singaporean footballer

Personal information
- Full name: Kuniuraman Kannan
- Place of birth: Singapore
- Position: Forward

Senior career*
Years	Team	Apps	(Gls)
1980	Jurong Town		
1981–1985	Singapore FA		
1986–1987	Kuala Lumpur FA	17	(15)
1988	Singapore FA	17	(11)
1989–1991	Kuala Lumpur FA	45	(15)
1992	Singapore FA		
1993	Geylang International FC		
1994	Changi United		

International career
1980–1991	Singapore		
- * Club domestic league appearances and goals

Kuniuraman Kannan (sometimes spelt Kunjuraman Kannan), more popularly known as K. Kannan, is a Singaporean football forward who played for Singapore. He was in the Singapore squad in the 1984 Asian Cup. He also played for Jurong Town.

== Career ==
In the Malaysia Cup tournament, Kannan has played for Singapore FA (debuting in 1981) and Kuala Lumpur FA.

Kannan was named the Player of the Year in FAS Premier League 1992 season while playing for Geylang International. He then signed a record S$120,000 contract to play for Changi United.

=== Match-fixing ===
Following widespread rumours about corruption within the sports among the teams who played in the Malaysia Premier League (MPL), the Corrupt Practices Investigation Bureau (CPIB) launched an investigation and had interviewed multiple players, including Kannan. On 24 October 1994, Kannan and Changi United Club manager Ong Kheng Hock was arrested for match-fixing at the recent MPL season. On instructions from a businessman, Rajendran R. Kupusamy. They faced three charges for allegedly trying to fix two MPL matches by bribing goalkeeper David Lee as while as receiving rewards for their actions. In the first match against Perlis, Lee was offered S$80,000 and he was to help reduce the winning margins by Singapore. Singapore won 2-1 in that match. In the second match against, Selangor, Lee was offered S$60,000 to ensure that the game would end up in a draw. Singapore won 3-1 in that match instead. Lee was not charged with any crimes.

Rajendran was named as the witness in this case. In the seven-day-long trial, Lee testified that he was not aware of the match-fixing plans. Kannan and Ong was found guilty of conspiring and bribery, and were jailed and fined. Football Association of Singapore also had banned Kannan, and other players involved in corruption and match-fixing for life from the sports.

Over the years, Kannan would file five appeals to the FAS, appealing to them to remove the ban against him. However, they were largely unsuccessful until in 2022 when FAS decided to lift the ban after reviewing his fifth attempt. One of his release conditions was to participate in anti-corruption drives and engagements for six months from when the ban was lifted.

== Personal life ==
Kannan is married with 3 children.

== Honours ==
=== Club ===
Kuala Lumpur FA

- Malaysia Cup (2) : 1987, 1989

=== International ===
Singapore

- SEA Games

Silver medal: 1983

=== Individual ===
- M-League Golden Boot: 1987
