= East Pakistan Gymkhana FC =

Bangladeshi football club

EP Gymkhana FC
- Full name: East Pakistan Gymkhana Football Club
- Founded: 1948
- Dissolved: 1958 (Football section dissolved)

East Pakistan Gymkhana Football Club (Bengali: পূর্ব পাকিস্তান জিমখানা ফুটবল ক্লাব), also referred as EP Gymkhana, was an association football club based in Dhaka, Bangladesh (previously East Pakistan). The club most notably won the Dhaka First Division League in 1949. The football team was part of the larger multi-sports East Pakistan Gymkhana Club (later Bangladesh Gymkhana Club), which included a cricket team that operated even after the Independence of Bangladesh.

== History ==
East Pakistan Gymkhana was founded after the partition of India, with former Calcutta Mohammedan footballers Habibullah Bahar and Rashid Ahmed serving as its president and general secretary, respectively. It was one of the few Dhaka-based clubs to own its own practice ground, located in the Paltan area of Dhaka, on the later constructed Baitul Mukarram Mosque. In 1948, the club won the inaugural Second Division Football League held in Dhaka after partition.

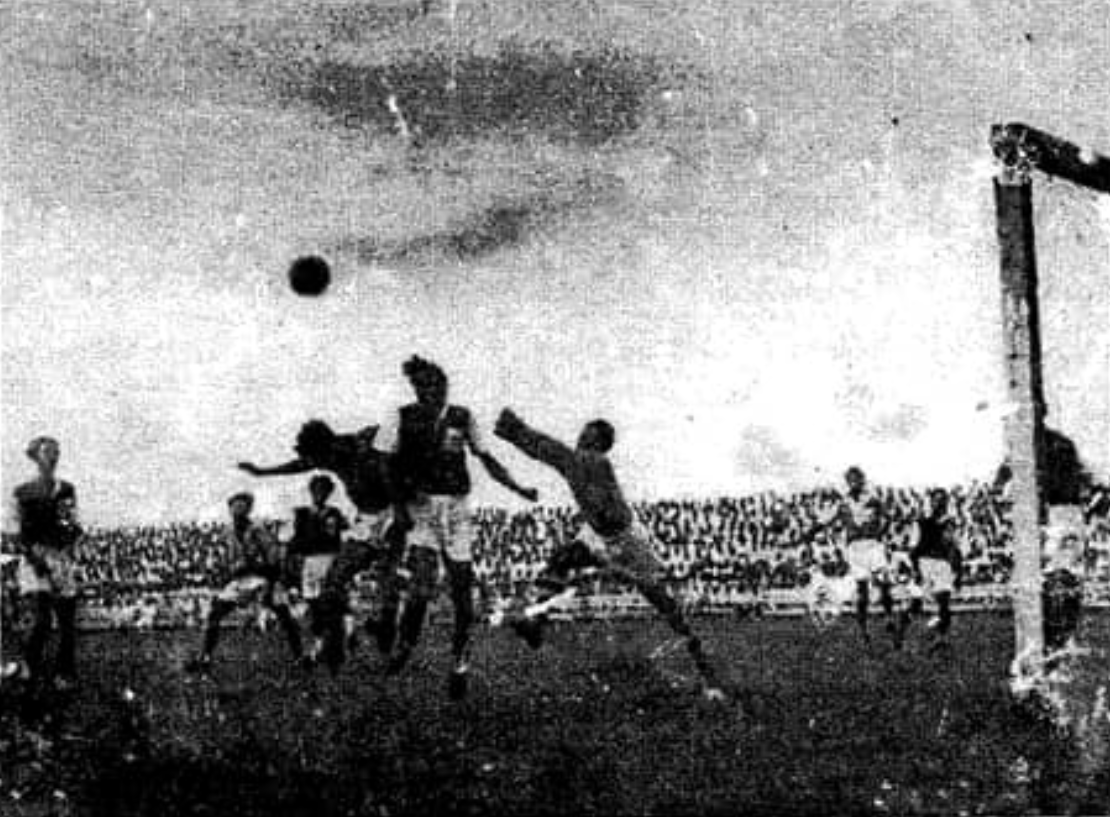
Dhaka Wanderers vs East Pakistan Gymkhana, First Division League, 1950s.

Gymkhana's starting line-up against Mahuttuli Club which they won 2–0 to secure the 1951 First Division League title on 30 July.

In 1949, the club played their inaugural First Division Football League match against reigning champions, Victoria SC on 25 May, and lost 0–8. Nevertheless, the Gymkhana team captained by Ikramul Amin Asad lost only one more game the entire season, and clinched the league title on 30 July, following a 2–0 victory against Mahuttuli Club. The club's attacker Wahed scored both goals in the game. On 2 August, Gymkhana ended the season with a 1–0 victory against New East Bengal Club, with their striker, Aminur Rahman Dhonu scoring the lone goal. They finished with 26 points from 16 league games, recording 12 victories, 2 draws, and 2 defeats, and became the first all-Muslim club to win the First Division title. Notably, the Gymkhana team mainly consisted of Dhaka University students.

Notable players from the team during its title winning season include Alauddin Khan, Illias Uddin, Mohamed Rashidullah, Kodrot Ullah, Amanullah, Khan Majlish, Fazlur Arzu, Abdul Khaleque, and Shokhi Samad. In 1950, the club finished runners-up in the First Division, behind Dhaka Wanderers. In 1951, the team was trained by former Calcutta Mohammedan center-forward, Hafiz Rashid. In 1954, the club finished bottom of the league with nine points from 24 games, however, were spared from relegation after the East Pakistan Sports Federation (EPSF) opted not to enforce relegation for the second consecutive season. Eventually, after 1957, the team dropped out of the First Division and soon discontinued its football operations.

== Honours ==
- Dhaka First Division League
  - Champions (1): 1949
  - Runners-up (1): 1950
- Dhaka Second Division League
  - Champions (1): 1948

== See also ==
- List of football clubs in Bangladesh
- History of football in Bangladesh
