= Oleg Zhivotnikov =

Russian footballer

Personal information
- Full name: Oleg Zhivotnikov
- Date of birth: April 7, 1967 (age 59)
- Place of birth: Russia
- Height: 1.85 m (6 ft 1 in)
- Position: Forward

Senior career*
| Years | Team | Apps | (Gls) |
| 1990 | FC Torgmash Lyubertsy | 11 | (0) |
| 1991 | Mohameddan SC | | |
| 1992–1993 | FC Interros Moscow | 38 | (5) |
| 1993 | Mohameddan SC | ? | (13) |
| 1994 | FC Tekhinvest-M Moscow | 0 | (0) |
| 1994–1995 | FC Asmaral Moscow | 47 | (13) |
| 1995 | FC Torpedo Moscow | 11 | (0) |
| 1996 | IFK Luleå | 5 | (1) |
| 1996 | FC Gazovik-Gazprom Izhevsk | 9 | (1) |
- * Club domestic league appearances and goals

Oleg Zhivotnikov (Russian: Олег Животников; born April 7, 1967) is a retired Russian professional footballer.

Zhivotnikov played in the Russian Premier League with FC Torpedo Moscow.

== Honours ==
- Dhaka Premier Division League champion: 1993
- Dhaka Premier Division League top scorer: 1993
