= Khaled Habib Al-Waheebi =

Qatari footballer (born 1970)

Personal information
- Date of birth: 1 December 1970 (age 55)

Senior career*
Years	Team	Apps	(Gls)
- Al Sadd
- Al Wakra

International career
- Qatar
- * Club domestic league appearances and goals

Khaled Habib Al-Waheebi (born 1 December 1970) is a Qatari footballer. He competed in the men's tournament at the 1992 Summer Olympics.
