= Dhaka First Division Football League =

Bangladeshi top-tier football league (1971–1992)

- Organising bodies: DSA (c. 1911–1950); EPSA (1951); EPSF (1951–1971); BFF (1972–1992)
- Founded: c. 1911; 1948 (recognized) (Note: The Dhaka Football League has been held since at least 1911. However, champions from before the Partition of India, particularly in the First Division, have not yet been officially recognized by the Bangladesh Football Federation (BFF). In addition, a complete list of champions from its current three-tier structure during the British Raj is still incomplete and under research.)
- First season: 1948 (recognized)
- Folded: 1992 (second-tier (1993–2006))
- Country: Bangladesh
- Confederation: AFC
- Number of clubs: 20 (1991–92)
- Level on pyramid: 1 (1971–1992); 2 (1993–2006)
- Relegation to: Dhaka Second Division League
- Domestic cup(s): Federation Cup; Independence Cup; DMFA Cup; Independence Day Tournament
- International cup(s): Asian Club Championship (1985–92); Asian Cup Winners' Cup (1990–92)
- Last champions: Dhaka Abahani (8th title) (1991–92)
- Most championships: Mohammedan (15 titles)
- Top scorer: Sheikh Mohammad Aslam (154)

Dhaka First Division Football League (Note: It was the sole Senior Division of the Dhaka Football League until 1993.) (Bengali: ঢাকা প্রথম বিভাগ ফুটবল লিগ) was the top-tier football league in Bangladesh until 1992. Established as part of the Dhaka Football League during the period when present-day Bangladesh was under the British Raj, it served as the country's premier football competition for many decades. Following the introduction of the Premier Division in 1993, the First Division became the second-tier league until 2006. Together, the Premier Division and First Division formed the Senior Division of the Dhaka Football League.

Mohammedan is the league's most successful club with a record 15 titles, followed by Dhaka Abahani with eight. The two clubs contest the Dhaka derby, traditionally the league's best-attended fixture since the country's independence. Dhaka Wanderers have won seven titles all prior to independence, while BJMC, formerly EPIDC, has won five championships. Victoria has won three post-partition of India titles, with its pre-partition championships unrecognized. The only other champions since partition are: EPG Press, EP Gymkhana, and Azad.

During its time as Bangladesh's top-tier league, in the absence of a National League, the First Division champions qualified for the Asian Club Championship from 1985 and, on one occasion, for the Asian Cup Winners' Cup in 1991–92. From the 1990–91 edition, however, the Federation Cup champions were entered into the Asian Club Championship instead. Mohammedan are the most successful First Division club in continental football, having reached the semi-final group stage once (1988–89) and the quarter-final group stage twice (1990–91 and 1991).

Not all pre-partition league winners have been recorded, and they have not been recognized by the Bangladesh Football Federation (BFF), although winners from the period when the region was part of Pakistan (1948–1970) are recognized. Following independence, the Dhaka Metropolitan Football Association (DMFA) began operating the Dhaka Football League under the supervision of BFF.

== History ==
=== British Raj era (c. 1911–1947) ===
Known First Division champions (Pre-1947)
Season	Champions	Runners-up
1931	Muslim Hall	Unknown
1935	Dacca Hall	Unknown
1936	Dacca Farm	Unknown
1937	Dacca Farm	Unknown
1940	Dacca Farm	Unknown
1942	Wari	East End
1943	Victoria	Unknown
1946	B.A. Railway	Wari
1947	Not held due to the partition of India and India–Pakistan war of 1947–1948	

The Dhaka Sports Association (DSA) was established in 1895 in Paltan, Dhaka, British India, as the governing body for sports in the city. During the first decade of the 20th century, the DSA established the Dhaka Football League, one of the earliest organised football competitions in the region. The earliest known record of the DSA First Division appears in the Englishman's Overland Mail newspaper of 21 September 1911, which reported that the league final between Wari Club and Settlement Club was to be replayed on 13 September. However, no contemporary report confirming the result of the replay has been found.

According to the DSA's 42nd Annual Report for 1937–38, the First Division, Second Division, and Third Division competitions were all held in Dhaka. At the time, the First Division featured 10 teams, the Second Division had 9 teams, and the Third Division comprised 6 teams. In addition to sports clubs such as Wari, Victoria, Dacca Farm, and Luxmibazar, the First Division also included several institutional teams, notably Dacca Intermediate College, Jagannath Intermediate College, Medical College, Dacca Hall, and Muslim Hall, the latter two being residential halls of Dhaka University. The participation of institutional teams declined following the introduction of the Institutional Football League in the late 1930s or early 1940s.

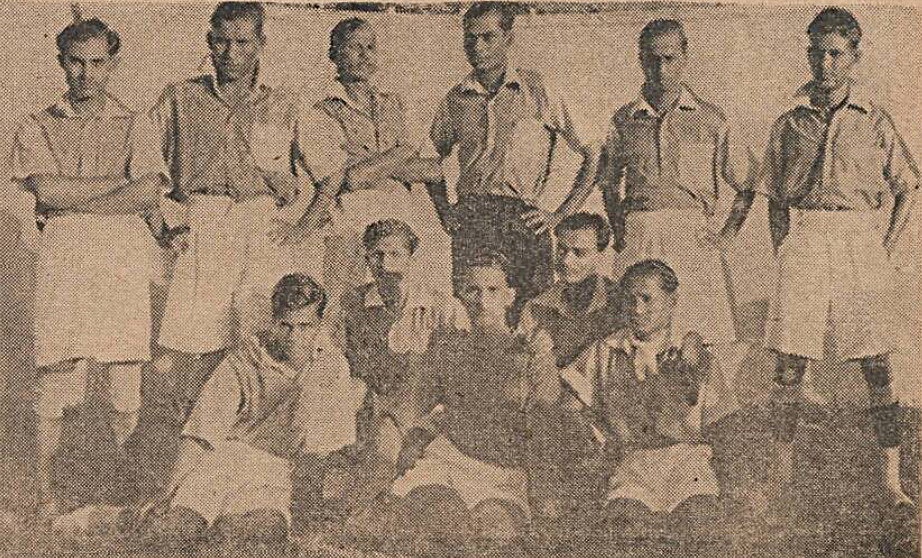
Dacca Farm were among the most successful First Division clubs that disbanded prior to the partition of India.

The Ronaldshay Shield, which began in the 1920s, was the region's principal cup competition, with clubs from all three tiers of the Dhaka Football League, alongside various institutional teams, historically participating in the knockout tournament held annually in Dhaka. Wari became the first First Division club from Dhaka to participate in the historic IFA Shield in West Bengal in 1914, followed by Victoria in 1917. Dacca Farm, which won the First Division as a newly promoted team from the Second Division in 1936, won the Mohendra Memorial Football Tournament in Delhi in 1939. The A.R.P. Cup Football Tournament was introduced in 1942 in Dhaka and was won by Wari, who also finished the year as unbeaten champions of both the First Division and the Ronaldshay Shield.

Notably, the clubs were composed primarily of Hindu players alongside European settlers. As the region had no Stadium infrastructure, league matches were played at Wari Ground, Victoria Ground, and the DSA Ground in Paltan. In 1946, B.A. Railway won the first edition of the First Division following World War II. However, the following year, the Dhaka Football League became inactive due to the partition of India and its aftermath, including the India–Pakistan war of 1947–1948.

=== Post-partition developments (1948–1959) ===
The Dhaka Football League, including its First and Second Divisions, resumed in 1948 alongside other district football leagues in East Bengal following the partition of India. In the same year, the DSA inaugurated the Independence Day Football Tournament, which would later replace the Ronaldshay Shield as the province's primary cup competition. The partition had a significant impact on the league, as many established players, most of whom were Hindus, migrated to India. Concurrently, several prominent Muslim footballers from the Calcutta Football League in West Bengal relocated to Pakistan, primarily to its eastern wing. Notable among these were Mohammad Shahjahan, Alauddin Khan, Yusuf Khan, Abbas Mirza, Hafiz Rashid, Abdul Khaleque, Motahar Ali Khan, and Mohammad Yasin.

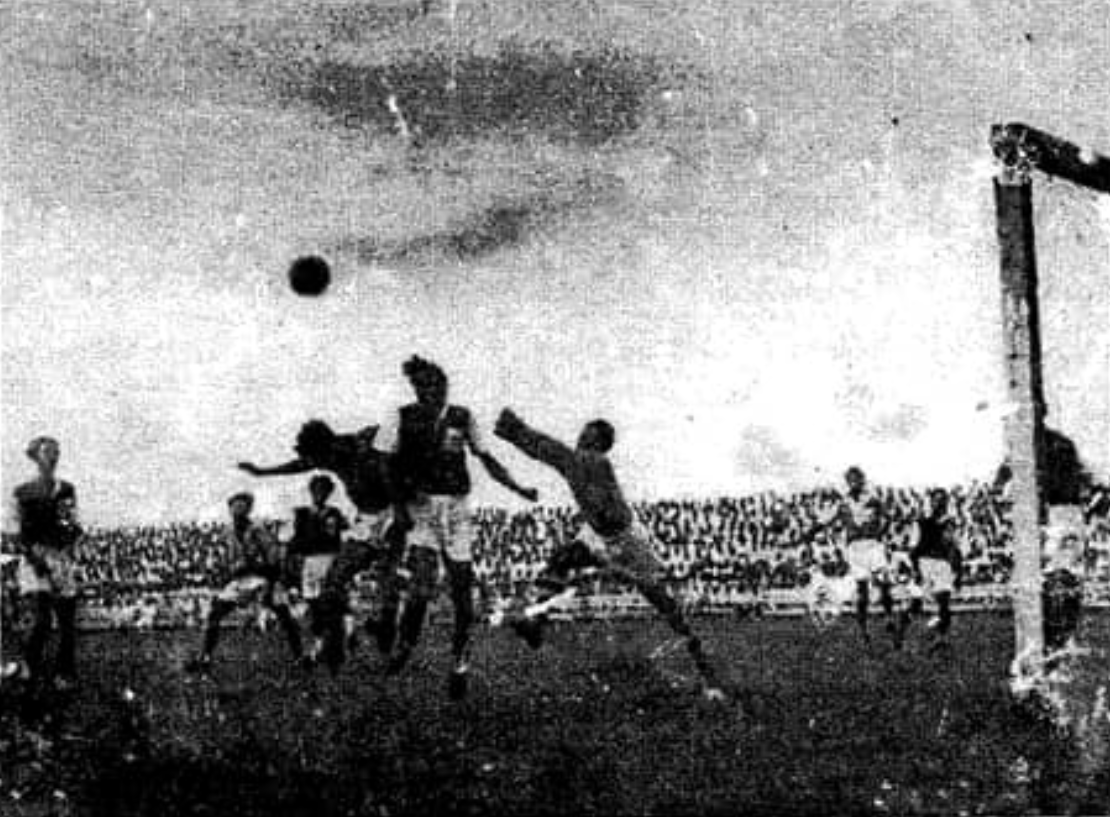
Dhaka Wanderers vs EP Gymkhana, First Division match, 1950s.

In January 1951, the DSA was renamed the East Pakistan Sports Association (EPSA). On 20 May 1951, the East Pakistan Sports Federation (EPSF) merged with the EPSA, assumed control of the Football League, (Note: Unlike football leagues in other districts of East Pakistan (formerly East Bengal), which were administered by their respective district sports associations, the Dhaka Football League was administered by the EPSF from 1951 to 1970 as the highest level of football in the province.) and inaugurated that year's First Division five days later. In 1949, EP Gymkhana became the first newly promoted team to win the First Division following partition, a feat later matched by EBG Press in 1952. Gymkhana's triumph also marked the first time the league was won by an all-Muslim team. Early dominance in the league was established by Dhaka Wanderers, who won six First Division titles between 1950 and 1956, only missing out in 1952. Notably, the 1955 season was abandoned midway due to regional flooding, with Wanderers top of the table, they were subsequently recorded as champions.

In 1954, the Dhaka Stadium was constructed on the former DSA Ground, later known as the EPSF Ground, becoming East Pakistan's first dedicated stadium. From 1956 onwards, First Division matches were regularly held at the venue. The practice grounds of Mohammedan, Wari, and Victoria also hosted league matches until they were taken over by the EPSF during Brigadier Sahib Dad Khan's tenure as president, beginning in 1959. Thereafter, the Dhaka Stadium and the Outer Stadium Ground became the two primary venues for First Division fixtures.

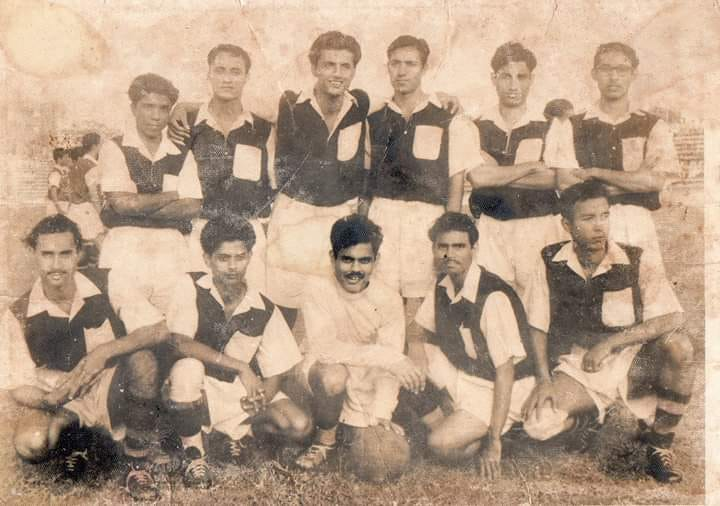
Mohammedan runners-up in 1956, would become the most successful First Division team over the following decades.

The 1956 season was decided by the High Court after Dhaka Wanderers and Mohammedan, who had signed six Wanderers players before the season, finished level on points at the end of the league stage. Although a championship play-off was scheduled, Mohammedan declined to participate. The EPSF arbitration board awarded the title to Wanderers, a decision later upheld by the High Court. Mohammedan won their inaugural league title the following year.

From 21 October to 10 November 1957, the National Championship, Pakistan's highest-level football competition, was held in Dhaka for only the second time. The local East Pakistan White team, consisting entirely of First Division players, finished as runners-up. Following the tournament, six Bengali players were selected for the Pakistan national team: Amir Jang Ghaznavi, Kabir Ahmed, Nabi Chowdhury, Mari Chowdhury, Ashraf Chowdhury, and Manzur Hasan Mintu.

The EPSF introduced the Aga Khan Gold Cup (considered the predecessor of the AFC Champions League Elite) in Dhaka in 1958, with the trophy donated by Aga Khan IV (Shah Karim al-Hussaini) of Iran. Although the inaugural edition was won by Karachi Kickers from West Pakistan, Mohammedan won the tournament the following year, while also becoming First Division champions in the same year.

=== Inflow of West Pakistanis (1960–1970) ===
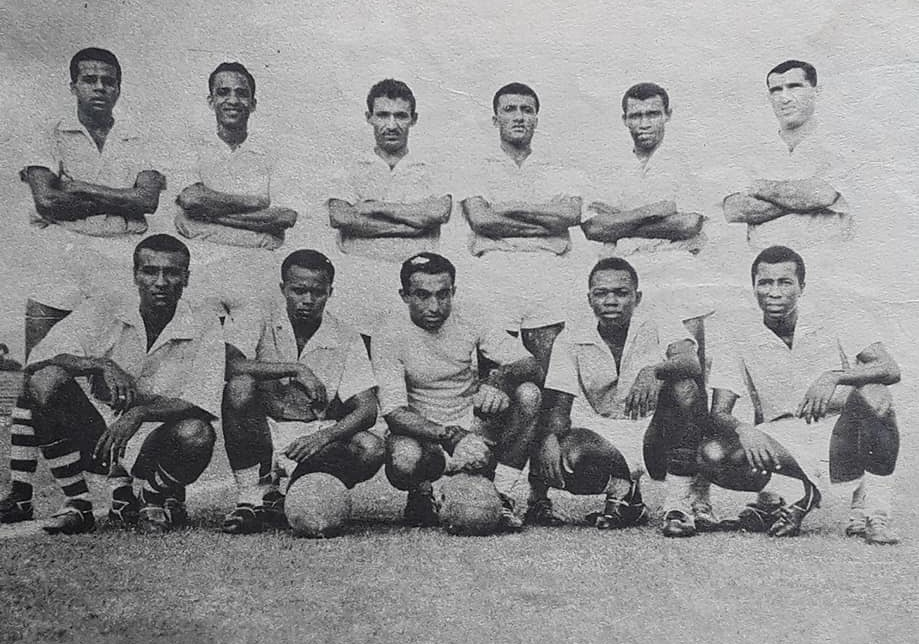
The First Division winning Victoria team of 1962 was labelled as Makrani XI

Towards the late fifties, many First Division clubs began recruiting footballers from West Pakistan, a trend that started with Abid Hussain Ghazi joining Victoria in 1958. Mohammedan and Dhaka Wanderers soon followed by strengthening their squads with players from West Pakistan. Mohammedan's team featured several Pakistani internationals of Makrani descent, including Abdul Ghafoor, Ghulam Abbas, Yousuf Jr. and Abdullah Rahi. The club won the 1961 First Division title after scoring 118 goals and conceding only 17 throughout the campaign.

In 1962, Victoria signed several West Pakistani players from Dhaka Mohammedan and Kolkata Mohammedan. Under the captaincy of player-coach Muhammad Umer, the club won the First Division title that year and repeated the feat in 1964, remaining unbeaten in both championship-winning campaigns. Victoria, however, withdrew from football activities during the 1963 season following the EPSF's suspension of winger Yousuf Sr., who had assaulted an opponent during a league match. The decision coincided with criticism from The Pakistan Observer, which labelled the side Makrani XI and criticised its heavy reliance on non-local players, many of whom also became eligible to represent the provincial team.

On 1 July 1964, Victoria's Umer set a league record of netting 10 goals in a single-match, including a hat-trick (three consecutive goals), in a 13–0 victory over Wari. The influx of West Pakistani players also contributed to the decline of clubs such as Azad (1958 champions) and EBG Press (1952 champions), both of which relied primarily on local players. Throughout the pre-independence era, league matches were played over 70 minutes, consisting of two 35-minute halves. The only exception came in 1962, when the EPSF reduced the duration of league matches to 60 minutes, with two 30-minute halves, a decision reverted within two seasons.

In 1966, Mohammedan won the First Division title, scoring 103 league goals, 51 of which were contributed by forward Moosa Ghazi. In the same year, EPIDC, a club owned by the East Pakistan Industrial Development Corporation, entered the First Division. The corporate-backed side assembled a high-profile squad featuring Pakistani internationals such as Abdul Jabbar, Ayub Dar, and Gafur Baloch, while offering employment within the corporation to its players. EPIDC went on to win three league titles in four seasons, claiming the championship in 1967, 1968, and 1970, the final season before the independence of Bangladesh. Its financial backing enabled the club to surpass Mohammedan as the league's dominant force, while former contenders Victoria and Dhaka Wanderers struggled to match its spending power.

=== Post-independence: Mohammedan vs Abahani (1971–1992) ===
Results of Mohammedan and Abahani post-independence
Season	MSC	DAL
1971	Not held	
1972	Not completed	
1973	2 (Note: Dhaka Abahani, Mohammedan and Dhaka Wanderers finished joint runners-up.)	2
1974	9	1
1975	1	2
1976	1	4
1977	SLG (Note: Mohammedan finished bottom of Group "B" in the Super League round.)	1
1978	1	3
1979	5	2
1980	1 (Note: Mohammedan shared the 1980 Federation Cup with Brothers Union.)	4
1981	2 (Note: Mohammedan and BJMC finished joint runners-up.)	1
1982	1 (Note: Mohammedan shared the 1982 Federation Cup with Dhaka Abahani.)	2
1983	2	1
1984	2 (Note: Dhaka Abahani shared the 1984 Federation Cup with Mohammedan.)	1
1985	3	1
1986	1	2
1987	1	2
1988–89	1	2
1989–90	2	1
1991	Not held	
1991–92	2	1
Total	8	8
Top two	14	15
Hat-trick	1	1
League champions Federation Cup; First Division/Federation Cup

The Dhaka Football League was not held in 1971 due to the Bangladesh Liberation War and resumed in 1972 under the newly formed Bangladesh Football Federation (BFF). Although it remained a district league, as it had before independence, it served as the highest level of football in the country until the establishment of a national league. Clubs were no longer permitted to field players from Pakistan, while in-game substitutions (one goalkeeper and two outfield players) were introduced for the first time.

The first First Division match in independent Bangladesh was played on 11 June at the Dhaka Stadium between BIDC (formerly EPIDC) and the 1970 Second Division champions, Dhaka Abahani (formerly Iqbal Sporting Club). The following day, Dhaka Wanderers defeated Dilkusha 5–1, with Nazir Ahmed becoming the first player to score both a goal and a hat-trick in the league after independence. However, the season was suspended after matches on 25 August following a series of attacks on referees and was ultimately abandoned, along with the Second and Third Division, after the BFF failed to implement its revised fixture schedule.

The first completed season after independence was held in 1973, when BIDC became the first league champions of Bangladesh. During the campaign, Hafizuddin Ahmed became the first player in independent Bangladesh to score a double hat-trick as Mohammedan defeated Fire Service 6–0 on 16 July. Responsibility for administering the league was also transferred to the Dhaka Metropolitan Football Association (DMFA) under the supervision of the BFF, while match duration was increased from 70 to 80 minutes, consisting of two 40-minute halves. The following year, the league committee introduced the Super League format, and in 1975 extended match duration to the international standard of 90 minutes, consisting of two 45-minute halves. However, the change was reversed from the 1976 season and 90-minute matches were not permanently reintroduced until the 1989–90 season.

Despite BIDC's First Division triumphs in 1973 and 1979, the post-independence era was largely dominated by Awami League-backed Abahani and Mohammedan. Their rivalry, contested through the Dhaka derby, became the defining fixture of Bangladeshi club football during this period. Mohammedan was the only pre-independence champion to maintain its success after independence, while BJMC (renamed from BIDC in 1976) experienced a decline, suffering relegation in 1983. Although the club returned to the First Division in the 1989–90 season, it was unable to challenge for the league title again. Meanwhile, former contenders Dhaka Wanderers and Victoria struggled to remain competitive, spending much of the following decade in the lower half of the table. Of the 18 completed seasons held after independence, 16 were won by either Abahani or Mohammedan, with both clubs securing eight titles.

Abahani won their first First Division title in 1974, in a season where the BFF controversially used goals scored per match instead of goal difference as the deciding criterion, contrary to FIFA regulations. Mohammedan won the next two championships in 1975 and 1976, before Abahani reclaimed the title in 1977 and Mohammedan regained it in 1978. In 1980, the BFF inaugurated the Federation Cup as the country's league cup, with Mohammedan completing the first domestic double by winning both competitions.

Abahani became the first club to win three consecutive First Division titles, securing the championships in 1983, 1984, and 1985. The 1984 season marked a significant development in Dhaka football, as the Dhaka football authorities introduced the three-point system, making the league one of the earliest competitions outside England to adopt the format. The change proved decisive, as Abahani secured the title ahead of Mohammedan despite having a match in hand during the Super League stage. The success also earned Abahani qualification for the 1985–86 Asian Club Championship, making them the first club from Bangladesh to participate in the Asian Club Championship after the competition's revival following a 14-year hiatus. Meanwhile, Brothers Union emerged as another major contender, although they failed to become champions in the First Division era, the club finished as runners-up in 1978 and 1985.

The 1987 season, which reverted to the two points for a win system, was regarded as a peak period for Dhaka football, with Mohammedan signing Iranian international Reza Naalchegar and appointing Iranian legend Nasser Hejazi as head coach, while Abahani recruited Iranian duo Samir Shaker and Karim Allawi, both of whom featured at the 1986 FIFA World Cup. The two clubs finished level on points, requiring a playoff to determine the champions. After the first playoff ended in a 0–0 draw on 9 September, both teams requested to be declared joint champions, but the BFF rejected the proposal, suspended captains Sheikh Md Aslam and Ranjit Saha, and ordered a replay. Mohammedan secured the title with a 2–0 victory in the second playoff on 26 October, played behind closed doors at the Army Stadium following crowd trouble in the previous match. The club completed won its third consecutive title in the 1988–89 season, when the league was held at the Mirpur Stadium for the first time.

Abahani regained the league title in the 1989–90 season after the BFF banned the recruitment of foreign players for the campaign. The First Division was not held in 1991, and the 1991–92 season began on 10 January 1992. During the season, Abahani paid a South Asian record fee of Tk20 lakh to retain captain Monem Munna, who guided the club to its eighth and final First Division title. It was also the final edition of the league as the top-tier of football in the country.

=== Transition into second-level (1993–2006) ===
Following the BFF's introduction of the Premier Division, the top ten teams from the 1991–92 First Division qualified for the inaugural Premier Division in 1993. The clubs placed 11th–18th, together with the top two teams from the 1991–92 Second Division, competed in the First Division, which became the second tier. From 1993, the Premier Division and First Division together formed the Senior Division of the Dhaka Football League, a term that had previously referred only to the First Division. Eligibility for continental competition, previously awarded to the First Division champions, was transferred to the Premier Division champions and later to the winners of the National League. The First Division remained the second tier beneath the Premier Division until 2006, although its final season was played in 2004–05.

Following the introduction of the country's first professional national league, the Bangladesh Football League (initially the B.League), in 2007, the Premier Division and First Division were merged into a single Senior Division, which served as the country's second-tier while remaining a district-based competition until 2011. It became the third tier in 2012 following the introduction of the Bangladesh Championship League, the country's second-tier professional national league.

== Competition format and sponsorship ==
=== Timeline ===
Edition	Participants	Important events	ACC slots	Rel. slots
1948	n/a	League resumed following the partition of India.; The DSA introduced the Independence Day Football Tournament.	none	n/a
1949	9	Held in a double round-robin format.; Following clubs are promoted from Second Division: **EP Gymkhana**; Dhaka Electric Supply withdrew on 24 May 1949.	none	none
1950	10	Held in a double round-robin format.; Following clubs are promoted from Second Division: **Tejgaon Friends Union** and **Police**; New East Bengal Club withdrew.; Mahuttuli Club participated in the league as Dhaka FC.	none	none
1951	12	The EPSF took over operations of the Dhaka Football League from the EPSA (renamed from DSA earlier that year).; Held in a double round-robin format.; Following clubs are promoted from Second Division: **Fire Service** and **Azad**	none	1
1952	12	Held in a double round-robin format.; Following clubs are promoted from Second Division: **EPG Press**	none	1
1953	11	Held in a double round-robin format.; Following clubs are promoted from Second Division: **EP Rifles**; E.B. Railway did not participate	none	none
1954	13	Held in a double round-robin format.; Following clubs are promoted from Second Division: **East End** and **Ispahani**	none	none
1955	14	Following clubs are promoted from Second Division: **Signal Wings**; Dhaka Wanderers became the first club to win three consecutive league titles. The league was abandoned mid-season (officially on 29 July 1955) by the EPSF due to regional flood, with Dhaka Wanderers top of the table.	none	none
1956	15	Held in a single round-robin format.; Following clubs are promoted from Second Division: **Central Printing Press**; Dhaka Wanderers became the first club to win four consecutive First Division titles. Although they finished level on points with Mohammedan after the league stage, Mohammedan declined to play the championship play-off. A three-member EPSF arbitration board awarded the title to Dhaka Wanderers, and the decision was later upheld by the High Court.	none	none
1957	16	Held in a single round-robin format.; Following clubs are promoted from Second Division: **DC Mills**	none	none
1958	16	Held in a single round-robin format.; Following clubs are promoted from Second Division: **PWD**; EP Gymkhana did not participate.; Winners decided through a championship play-off match held on 17 August.	none	1
1959	15	Held in a single round-robin format.; Signal Wings merged with EP Rifles, reducing the number of participating clubs to 15.; Following clubs are promoted from Second Division: **Tejgaon Sporting**; DC Mills were suspended by the EPSF following 11 games. However, they were not relegated.	none	1
1960	15	Held in a single round-robin format.; Following clubs are promoted from Second Division: **Kamal**	none	2
1961	13	Held in a double round-robin format.; Following clubs are promoted from Second Division: **Adamjee**; Adamjee withdrew.	none	none
1962	13	Held in a double round-robin format.; The EPSF shortened league matches from 70 to 60 minutes, with two 30-minute halves separated by a five-minute half-time interval.; Following clubs are promoted from Second Division: **P.E. Railway**; E.P. Rifles withdrew. However, they were not relegated.	none	1
1963	13	Held in a double round-robin format.; Following clubs are promoted from Second Division: **DC Jail**; Victoria withdrew. Although initially relegated, they were reinstated the following season.	none	1
1964	11	Held in a double round-robin format.; The EPSF returned to conducting 70-minute matches, with each half lasting 35 minutes.; Following clubs are promoted from Second Division: **Fire Service**; Ispahani did not participate.; DC Jail withdrew.	none	none
1965	12	Held in a double round-robin format.; Following clubs are promoted from Second Division: **Rahmatganj**	none	none
1966	13	Held in a double round-robin format.; Following clubs are promoted from Second Division: **EPIDC**	none	1
1967	13	Held in a double round-robin formattwice.; Winners decided through a championship play-off match held on 23 November.; Following clubs are promoted from Second Division: **Railway Pioneers**	none	1
1968	13	Held in a double round-robin format.; Following clubs are promoted from Second Division: **East End**	none	1
1969	13	Held in a double round-robin format.; Following clubs are promoted from Second Division: **Dilkusha**; Victoria withdrew. However, they were not relegated.; EPIDC withdrew. However, they were not relegated.	none	none
1970	14	Held in a double round-robin format.; Following clubs are promoted from Second Division: **EPWAPDA**; Mohammedan withdrew. However, they were not relegated.; The EPSF decided to end the season without completing all the fixtures.	none	none
1971	The Dhaka Football League was cancelled due to the Bangladesh Liberation War.			
1972	15	The BFF took over operations of the Dhaka Football League from the EPSF.; Following clubs are promoted from Second Division (1970): Dhaka Abahani (renamed from Iqbal Sporting Club); Club's were allowed to make in game substitutions (1 goalkeeper, 2 outfield players) for the first time in the league's history.; On 12 June, Dhaka Wanderers striker Nazir Ahmed Sr scored a hat-trick against Dilkusha, becoming the first player to achieve the feat since the country's independence.; The BFF suspended the league following numerous attacks on referees during league matches. The final match was played on 25 August, after which the league came to a halt. It was eventually abandoned after the BFF failed to implement its revised fixture schedule. Notably, both the Second Division and Third Division were also abandoned before their completion.	none	none
1973	15	Held in a double round-robin format.; The BFF increased the duration of league matches from 70 to 80 minutes, with two 40-minute halves separated by a five-minute half-time interval.; The Dhaka Metropolitan Football Association (DMFA) began operating the league under the supervision of the BFF.; On 16 July, Hafizuddin Ahmed became the first player in independent Bangladesh to score a double hat-trick, as Mohammedan defeated Fire Service 6–0.	none	none
1974	16	The top six clubs following the first half of the season qualified for the Super League (with points not carried over), where they played each other once to determine the championship.; Following clubs are promoted from Second Division: **BRTC**; According to the FIFA rules Dilkusha should have been handed the title due to a higher goal difference. However, the league committee decided to use average goal scored to differentiate positions.	none	1
1975	16	Held in a double round-robin format.; Following clubs are promoted from Second Division: **Brothers Union**; The DMFA increased the duration of league matches from 80 to 90 minutes, with two 45-minute halves separated by a ten-minute half-time interval.	none	1
1976	16	The top eight clubs following the first half of the season qualified for the Super League (with points not carried over), in which each club played the others once. The teams were then divided into two groups of four, with the top two from each group advancing to the knockout stage to compete for the championship.; Following clubs are promoted from Second Division: **Shantinagar**; The DMFA reduced the duration of league matches from 90 to 80 minutes, with two 40-minute halves separated by a five-minute half-time interval.	none	1
1977	16	The top eight clubs following the first half of the season qualified for the Super League (with points not carried over), in which each club played the others once. The clubs were then divided into two groups of four, with the top two teams from each group advancing to the knockout stage to compete for the championship.; Following clubs are promoted from Second Division: **Sadharan Bima**; Dhaka Abahani became the first club in independent Bangladesh to become unbeaten league champions.	none	1
1978	16	The top ten teams following the first half of the league qualified for the Super League (with points carried over), which was contested as a single round-robin to determine the championship.; Following clubs are promoted from Second Division: **Fire Service**	none	none
1979	17	The top eight clubs following the first half of the season qualified for the Super League (with points not carried over), which was contested as a single round-robin to determine the championship.; Following clubs are promoted from Second Division: **Dhanmondi**	none	2
1980	16	The top eight teams following the first half of the league qualified for the Super League (with points carried over), which was contested as a single round-robin to determine the championship.; Following clubs are promoted from Second Division: **Arambagh**; The BFF inaugurated the Federation Cup as the league cup.	none	none
1981	17	The top nine teams following the first half of the league qualified for the Super League (with points carried over), which was contested as a single round-robin to determine the championship.; Following clubs are promoted from Second Division: **Farashganj**	none	none
1982	17	The top eight teams following the first half of the league qualified for the Super League (with points carried over), which was contested as a single round-robin to determine the championship.; For the first time since the partition of India, the First Division began without a newly promoted team, as the Second Division had not been held the previous year.; Mohammedan striker Abdus Salam Murshedy scored a record 27 goals, the highest in a single league season since the independence of Bangladesh.	none	1
1983	17	The top eight teams at the end of the first half of the league qualified for the Super League (with points carried over), which was contested as a single round-robin to determine the championship.; Following clubs are promoted from Second Division: **BRTC**	none	1
1984	17	The top eight teams at the end of the first half of the league qualified for the Super League (with points carried over), which was contested as a single round-robin to determine the championship, while the bottom four teams entered the relegation league, which was also contested as a single round-robin.; The three-point system was adopted, replacing the previous 2-point-for-a-win system. Under the new system, teams received 3 points for a win, 1 point for a draw, and 0 points for a loss.; Following clubs are promoted from Second Division: **Muktijoddha**; The DMFA deducted six points from Dhaka Abahani after its players attacked referee Zahirul Haque during a first-phase match against Rahmatganj on 9 June 1984. The decision was later overturned on 23 June 1984 following protests by Abahani supporters.; Dhaka Abahani became the first club in independent Bangladesh to win three consecutive league titles.; The league champions became eligible for the reintroduced Asian Club Championship, qualifying for the 1985–86 edition.	1	2
1985	16	The top eight teams at the end of the first half of the league qualified for the Super League (with points carried over), where they played each other once in a single round-robin format, while the bottom four teams entered the relegation league, where they also played each other once in a single round-robin format.; Following clubs are promoted from Second Division: **PWD**	none	1
1986	16	The top eight teams at the end of the first half of the league qualified for the Super League (with points carried over), where they played each other once in a single round-robin format, while the bottom four teams entered the relegation league, where they also played each other once in a single round-robin format.; Following clubs are promoted from Second Division: **Mirpur Chalantika**; Mohammedan qualified for the 1987 Asian Club Championship as league champions.	1	1
1987	16	Held in a single round-robin format.; The two-point system was reinstated, under which teams received 2 points for a win, 1 point for a draw, and 0 points for a loss.; The hat-trick rule was changed from requiring three consecutive goals to requiring three goals in a single game.; Following clubs are promoted from Second Division: **Adamjee**; The champions could not be determined in either the single round-robin league or the championship play-off match held on 9 September, which ended in a 0–0 draw between Mohammedan and Dhaka Abahani. Following the match, both clubs refused to play extra time and declared themselves joint champions. However, the BFF and the league committee rejected this claim, penalised both clubs, annulled the match, and ordered a replay behind closed doors. The replay was eventually held at Bangladesh Army Stadium on 26 October.; Mohammedan qualified for the 1988–89 Asian Club Championship as league champions.	1	2
1988–89	16	Held in a single round-robin format.; The Mirpur Stadium replaced the Dhaka Stadium as the league's primary venue. As in previous seasons, matches were also held at the Outer Stadium.; Following clubs are promoted from Second Division: **Fakirerpool and Agrani Bank**; Mohammedan became the first club to win three consecutive league titles unbeaten.; Mohammedan qualified for the 1989–90 Asian Club Championship as league champions.	1	none
1989–90	18	Held in a single round-robin format.; The DMFA increased the duration of league matches from 80 to 90 minutes, with two 45-minute halves separated by a ten-minute half-time interval.; A relegation play-off match was required after the teams finishing 17th and 18th were tied on points. BJMC defeated Dhaka Wanderers 4–3 on penalties following a 0–0 draw after extra time on 19 April 1990. Nevertheless, Dhaka Wanderers were reprieved from relegation after the top division was expanded to 20 clubs for the following season.; Following clubs are promoted from Second Division: **BJMC and Wari**; Sheikh Mohammad Aslam of Dhaka Abahani set a new record of being the league's highest scorer in five different seasons.; Although Dhaka Abahani were champions of the First Division, Mohammedan participated in the 1990–91 Asian Club Championship as 1989 Federation Cup winners.; Dhaka Abahani qualified for the 1991–92 Asian Cup Winners' Cup as league champions.	none	none
1991	Not held.: Mohammedan participated in the 1991 Asian Club Championship as 1989 Federation Cup winners.			
1991–92	20	Held in a single round-robin format.; Following clubs are promoted from Second Division: **Eskaton and Police**; Dhaka Abahani paid a South Asian record of Tk20 lakh to Monem Munna.; Dhaka Abahani dropped only one point, finishing with 37 out of a possible 38, a record in Bangladeshi football.; Brothers Union winners of the 1991 Federation Cup qualified for the 1992–93 Asian Club Championship.; This was the final season of the First Division as the top tier of the country. Following the BFF's introduction of the Premier Division, the top ten teams from the 1991–92 First Division entered the inaugural Premier Division in 1993, while the teams placed 11th–18th remained in the First Division, which began operating as the second-tier from 1993.	none	none

=== Relegation Summary ===
1948–1970

From 1948 to 1970, the EPSF normally allowed only the champions of the Second Division to earn promotion to the First Division, with the exceptions of 1949, 1950 and 1953, during which the top-two clubs of the Second Division earned promotion. However, relegation was irregular during this period, causing the number of participating teams to vary from season to season. Prior to the independence of Bangladesh, clubs would regularly withdraw either before or during league seasons. Although such withdrawals normally followed relegation to the Second Division, the EPSF excused the withdrawals of Victoria in both 1963 and 1969, EP Rifles in 1963, EPIDC in 1969, and Mohammedan in 1970.

1971–1992

Due to the Bangladesh Liberation War and its aftermath, the First Division was not held in 1971 and was abandoned in 1972. The BFF continued the tradition of promoting and relegating one team per season (except in 1979 and 1984, when the bottom two clubs were relegated) until 1987, after which two clubs were promoted and relegated each season. However, there was no relegation during the final three editions (1988–89, 1989–90, and 1991–92) of the league as the top tier, increasing the number of participating teams to 20. Following the 1991–92 season, the top ten teams formed the Premier Division, while the clubs that finished 11th to 18th remained in the First Division, which served as the second-tier from 1993 to 2006.

1948–1992
Edition	Participants	Relegated positions	Relegated 1	Relegated 2	Withdrew	Relegated to
1948	N/A					
1949	10	–			Dhaka Electric Supply	1950 Second Division
1950	10	–			New East Bengal	1951 Second Division
1951	12	12th	Dhaka	None	None	1952 Second Division
1952	12	12th	Tikatuli	None	None	1953 Second Division
1953	11	–			E.B. Railway	1954 Second Division
1954	13	No relegation				
1955	14	No relegation				
1956	15	No relegation				
1957	16	No relegation				
1958	16	16th	Tejgaon Friends Union	None	**EP Gymkhana**	1959 Second Division
1959	15	15th	Tejgaon Sporting	None	None	1960 Second Division
1960	15	14th & 15th	East End	Kamal	None	1961 Second Division
1961	13	–			Adamjee	1962 Second Division
1962	13	13th	Fire Service	None	~~E.P. Rifles~~	1963 Second Division
1963	13	–			~~Victoria~~	1964 Second Division
1964	11	–			E.P. Rifles; Ispahani; DC Jail	1965 Second Division
1965	12	12th	~~P.E. Railway~~	None	None	~~1966 Second Division~~
1966	13	13th	P.E. Railway	None	None	1967 Second Division
1967	13	13th	Central Printing Press	None	None	1968 Second Division
1968	13	13th	Railway Blues	None	None	1969 Second Division
1969	13	No relegation			~~EPIDC~~; ~~Victoria~~	No relegation
1970	14	No relegation			~~Mohammedan~~	No relegation
1971	Not held					
1972	15	Not completed				
1973	15	No relegation				
1974	16	16th	Fire Service	None	None	1975 Second Division
1975	16	16th	BRTC	None	None	1976 Second Division
1976	16	16th	BG Press	None	None	1977 Second Division
1977	16	16th	Shantinagar	None	None	1978 Second Division
1978	16	No relegation				
1979	17	16th & 17th	Fire Service	PWD	None	1980 Second Division
1980	16	No relegation				
1981	17	No relegation				
1982	17	17th	Bangladesh Police	None	None	1983 Second Division
1983	17	17th	BJMC	None	None	1984 Second Division
1984	17	16th & 17th	WAPDA	Dilkusha	None	1985 Second Division
1985	16	16th	Azad	None	None	1986 Second Division
1986	16	16th	East End	None	None	1987 Second Division
1987	16	15th & 16th	Mirpur Chalantika	Wari	None	1988–89 Second Division
1988–89	16	Relegation play-off (17th vs 18th)	~~Dhaka Wanderers~~	None	None	~~1989–90 Second Division~~
1989–90	16	18	No relegation			
1991	Not held					
1991–92	20	No relegation				

Scrateched indicates that relegation was overturned.

Bold indicates that the club withdrew from participating in the second-tier the following season.

=== Sponsorship ===
The list below details who the sponsors have been and what they called the competition:

- 1987–90: NBL First Division Football League (referred to as Senior Division NBL Football League in 1987)
- 1991–92: STAR First Division Football League (sponsored by Bangladesh Tobacco Company)

== Champions ==
The list includes the total number of league titles each club has attained following the partition of India.

Titles won by club (%)
1. Mohammedan – 15 (36.6%)
2. Dhaka Abahani – 8 (19.5%)
3. Dhaka Wanderers – 7 (17.1%)
4. EPIDC/BJMC – 5 (12.2%)
5. Victoria – 3 (7.30%)
6. All others – 3 (7.30%)

Club	Titles	Winning years
Mohammedan	15	1957, 1959, 1961, 1963, 1965, 1966, 1969, 1975, 1976, 1978, 1980, 1982, 1986, 1987, 1988–89
Dhaka Abahani	8	1974, 1977, 1981, 1983, 1984, 1985, 1989–90, 1991–92
Dhaka Wanderers	7	1950, 1951, 1953, 1954, 1955, 1956, 1960
BJMC/EPIDC	5	1967, 1968, 1970, 1973, 1979
Victoria	3	1948, 1962, 1964
EP Gymkhana	1	1949
EBG Press	1	1952
Azad	1	1958

=== Doubles ===
Two teams have won the double of the First Division and the Federation Cup:

Club	Number	Seasons
Mohammedan	4	1980, 1982, 1987, 1988–89
Dhaka Abahani	1	1984, 1985

== Records ==
=== Unbeaten record ===
- Victoria (1962–1965)

1962–1965 : Victoria became the first recorded undefeated champions in 1962 following the partition of India. Their unbeaten run lasted 67 matches from 1962 to 1965, during which they won the league title in both 1962 and 1964. Notably, they withdrew from the First Division during the latter stages of the 1963 season; however, the EPSF reprieved them from relegation. Their unbeaten streak came to an end on 5 June 1965 with a 3–2 defeat to PWD.

- Mohammedan (1960, 1966, 1969, 1978, 1983, 1985–1990)

1960 : Mohammedan were the undefeated league runners-up behind arch-rivals, Dhaka Wanderers, whom they defeated in the final league game of the season. However, they missed out on the title by a single point, finishing with 25 points from 14 games, having won 11 matches.

1966 : Mohammedan were undefeated league champions, winning 22 out of 24 games and finished 7 points ahead (46 points) of runner-up Dhaka Wanderers.

1969 : Mohammedan were undefeated league champions for the third time. The league consisted of 12 teams, however, EPIDC withdrew after playing 18 games.

1978 : Mohammedan were undefeated champions again, in the normal league round they played 15 matches (8 wins and 7 draws), by the end of the Super League round they played a total of 24 matches (14 wins and 10 draws). Throughout the season they scored 44 goals and conceded 12 finishing with 38 points.

1983 : Runner-up Mohammedan were unbeaten alongside champions Dhaka Abahani. They earned 35 points (12 wins and 11 draws), scored 35 and conceded 35.

1985–1990 : Mohammedan were undefeated in the First Division from 8 September 1985 to 15 March 1990, which is the longest unbeaten run in Bangladeshi domestic football history. They were undefeated for one thousand six hundred and fifty days winning 63 times and drawing 13 times. They scored 160 and conceded 24 goals. The Black and Whites took the league title three times in a row from 1986 to 1989 (1986, 1987 and 1988–89).

- Dhaka Abahani (1977, 1983, 1989–92)

1977 : Dhaka Abahani became the first club in independent Bangladesh to win the league while remaining undefeated. In the first phase of the season, they played 15 matches, winning 10 and drawing 5, while scoring 27 goals and conceding just 5. In the Super League, they won all three of their group-stage matches to reach the knockout round, scoring 12 goals and conceding only 1. DMFA awarded Abahani a 2–0 victory over PWD in the semi-final after the replayed match, which followed an initial 0–0 draw, was abandoned while Abahani were leading 2–0, following an attack on referee Dalil Khan by PWD players over a penalty awarded to Abahani. The club then won the replayed championship play-off final against Rahmatganj 3–1 after the initial play-off final had ended in a 0–0 draw.

1983 : Dhaka Abahani won the league with 41 points from 23 matches (18 wins and 5 draws), scoring 44 and conceding 6. Mohammedan were the runner-up.

1989–92: Dhaka Abahani won the 1989–90 league with 30 points from 17 games (13 wins and 4 draws), scoring 31 and conceding 5. Mohammedan were thr runner-up. The First Division was not held in 1991, thus extending Abahani's unbeaten streak. In the 1991–92 season, Dhaka Abahani completed the league season unbeaten, winning the title for the second consecutive season. They played a total of 19 matches (18 wins and 1 draw), scored 53 goals and conceded 9. With 37 points they had four points more than runners-up Mohammedan.

- EPIDC/BJMC (1967, 1980)

1967 : EPIDC won their first-ever league title as unbeaten champions. The team finished the regular season with 20 victories and 4 draws, scoring 77 goals and conceding 18. Level on points with Mohammedan, EPIDC defeated them in the championship play-off on 23 November 1967, with goals from Salimullah and Abdul Jabbar. Their unbeaten streak was broken on 7 July 1968 following a 2–0 defeat to Mohammedan in their 10th match of the 1968 First Division League.

1980 : BJMC finished as unbeaten league runners-up, one point behind Mohammedan with 37 points from 22 matches (15 wins and 7 draws). They scored 34 goals and conceded six under coach Salimullah. The team was captained by Mostafa Hossain Mukul, while Sheikh Mohammad Aslam was the top scorer with 13 goals.

=== Goal record ===
Top scorers (1948–1992)
Year	Nationality	Player	Club	Goals	Source
1948	Unknown				
1949	Unknown				
1950	Unknown				
1951	Unknown				
1952	(Pakistan)	Rashid Chunna	EBG Press	Unknown	
1953	(Pakistan)	Anwar Hossain	Azad	49	
1954	Unknown				
1955	Unknown				
1956	Unknown				
1957	Unknown				
1958	(Pakistan)	Tajul Islam Manna	Azad	25	
1959	(Pakistan)	Ashraf Chowdhury	Mohammedan	16	
1960	(Pakistan)	Muhammad Yaqub	Dhaka Wanderers	26	
1961	(Pakistan)	Ghulam Abbas Baloch	Mohammedan	42	
1962	(Pakistan)	Ghulam Abbas Baloch	Victoria	38	
1963	(Pakistan)	Qayyum Changezi	Mohammedan	27	
1964	(Pakistan)	Muhammad Umer	Victoria	32	
1965	Unknown				
1966	(Pakistan)	Moosa Ghazi	Mohammedan	51	
1967	Unknown				
1968	(Pakistan)	Ayub Dar	EPIDC	31	
1969	(Pakistan)	Ali Nawaz Baloch	Mohammedan	45	
1970	Unknown				
1973	(Bangladesh)	Kazi Salahuddin	Dhaka Abahani	24	
1974	(Bangladesh)	Golam Shahid Neelu	Dilkusha	16	
1975	(Bangladesh)	AKM Nowsheruzzaman	Mohammedan	21	
1976	(Bangladesh)	Hafizuddin Ahmed	Mohammedan	13	
1976	(Bangladesh)	Mohammad Abdul Halim	PWD	13	
1977	(Bangladesh)	Kazi Salahuddin	Dhaka Abahani	14	
1978	(Bangladesh)	Enayetur Rahman Khan	Mohammedan	13	
1979	(Bangladesh)	Kazi Salahuddin	Dhaka Abahani	14	
1980	(Bangladesh)	Kazi Salahuddin	Dhaka Abahani	15	
1981	(Bangladesh)	Mohammed Mohsin	Brothers Union	20	
1982	(Bangladesh)	Abdus Salam Murshedy	Mohammedan	27	
1983	(Bangladesh)	Arif Abdul Khalek	Brothers Union	14	
1984	(Bangladesh)	Sheikh Mohammad Aslam	Dhaka Abahani	17	
1985	(Bangladesh)	Sheikh Mohammad Aslam	Dhaka Abahani	18	
1986	(Bangladesh)	Sheikh Mohammad Aslam	Dhaka Abahani	20	
1987	(Bangladesh)	Sheikh Mohammad Aslam	Dhaka Abahani	14	
1988–89	(Iran)	Bijan Taheri	Mohammedan	24	
1989–90	(Bangladesh)	Sheikh Mohammad Aslam	Dhaka Abahani	11	
1991–92	(Uzbekistan)	Azamat Abduraimov	Mohammedan	17	

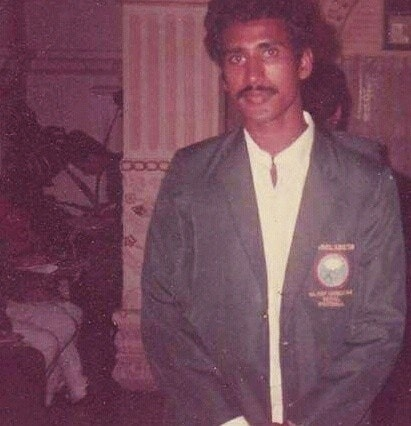
Sheikh Mohammad Aslam is the all time top-scorer in the Dhaka Football League with 177 goals (154 First Division and 23 Premier Division goals)

- Most goals in a season : Abdus Salam Murshedy

Season: 1982
Number of goals: 27
Team: Mohammedan

- Most Top Goal Scorer awards : Sheikh Mohammad Aslam

Season: 1984, 1985, 1986, 1987, 1989–90
Total goals: 80
Team: Dhaka Abahani

- Most goals in a game : Muhammad Umer

Season: 1964
Number of goals: 10
Team: Victoria (vs Wari; 1 July 1964)

- Most goals in a season (Pre-Independence) : Moosa Ghazi

Season: 1966
Number of goals: 51
Team: Mohammedan

NB Stats from the 1972 season are not being counted because the league was cancelled after only seven matchdays.

== Notable players ==
Here are some prominent footballers, who participated in the league.

- (Iran) Nasser Hejazi
- (Iran) Reza Naalchegar
- (Iran) Bijan Taheri
- (Nigeria) Emeka Ezeugo
- (Iraq) Samir Shaker
- (Iraq) Karim Allawi

== Asian competition ==
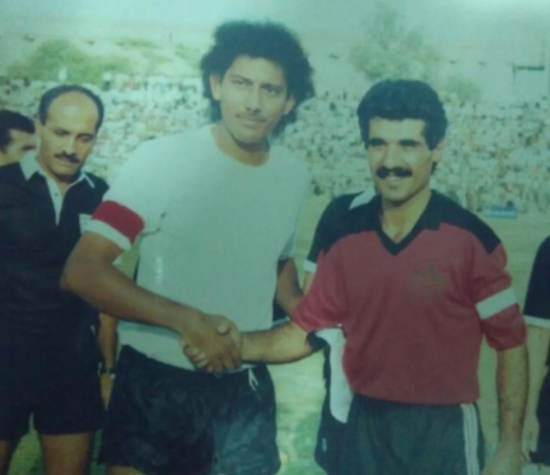
Mohammedan captain Kaiser Hamid (L) with Shahin Ahvaz captain Masoud Norouzi (R) during the 1989–90 Asian Club Championship.

AFC Club Championship (performance from 1985–93)

- Dhaka Abahani qualified for the 1985–86 Asian Club Championship as 1984 First Division champions.
- Bangladesh had no representation in the 1986 Asian Club Championship.
- Mohammedan qualified for the 1987 Asian Club Championship as 1986 First Division champions.
- Mohammedan qualified for the 1988–89 Asian Club Championship as 1987 First Division champions.
- Mohammedan qualified for the 1989–90 Asian Club Championship as 1988–89 First Division champions.
- Mohammedan qualified for the 1990–91 Asian Club Championship as 1989 Federation Cup winners.
- Mohammedan qualified for the 1991 Asian Club Championship as 1989 Federation Cup winners. Notably the 1991 First Division was not held.
- Brothers Union qualified for the 1992–93 Asian Club Championship as 1991 Federation Cup winners.
- Dhaka Abahani qualified for the 1993–94 Asian Club Championship as 1991–92 First Division winners. However, they withdrew.

Team	Appearances	1985–86	1986	1987	1988–89	1989–90	1990–91	1991	1992–93
Dhaka Abahani	1	QS	DNP	–	–	–	–	–	–
Dhaka Mohammedan	5	–	DNP	QS	SF^{1}	QS	QF^{2}	QF^{2}	–
Brothers Union	1	–	DNP	–	–	–	–	–	QS

W: Winners RU: Runners-up SF: Semifinals QF: Quarterfinals R16: Round of 16 GS: Group Stage QS: Qualifying Stage DNP: Did not participate W/D: Withdraw

- ^{1} Semi-final group round
- ^{2} Quarter-final group round

Asian Cup Asian Cup Winners' Cup (performance from 1990–93)

- Dhaka Abahani qualified for the 1991–92 Asian Cup Winners' Cup as 1989–90 First Division winners.
- Mohammedan qualified for the 1990–91 Asian Cup Winners' Cup as winners of the 1990 Ma-O-Moni Gold Cup.
- Mohammedan qualified for the 1992–93 Asian Cup Winners' Cup as 1991 Federation Cup runners-up.

Team	Appearances	1990–91	1991–92	1992–93
Dhaka Mohammedan	2	R2	–	IR
Dhaka Abahani	1	–	R1	–

W: Winners RU: Runners-up SF: Semifinals QF: Quarterfinals R1: First Round R2: Second Round IR: Intermediate Round DNP: Did not participate W/D: Withdraw

== See also ==
- Dhaka Football League
- Federation Cup
- Independence Cup
- Independence Day Football Tournament
- Aga Khan Gold Cup
- Bangladeshi football league system
- Dhaka derby
