= Chadongcha Sports Club =

North Korean sports club

Chadongcha 자동차
- Full name: Chadongcha Sports Club
- League: DPR Korea League

- Chadongcha Sports Club
- Chosŏn'gŭl: 자동차체육단
- Hancha: 自動車體育團
- Revised Romanization: Jadongchacheyukdan
- McCune–Reischauer: Chadongch'ach'eyuktan

Chadongcha Sports Club (Note: Also spelled Jadongcha.) (Korean: 자동차체육단) is a North Korean sports club based in Chongjin, North Korea. The club is affiliated with the North Korean Ministry of Land and Maritime Transport.

== Sports teams ==
The club has a football team, which competed in the 2007 season of the DPR Korea Premier Football League.

It is not known whether Chadongcha has other sports teams other than football.
