= British American Tobacco Bangladesh =

Bangladesh regional subsidiary of British American Tobacco

British American Tobacco Bangladesh Company Limited
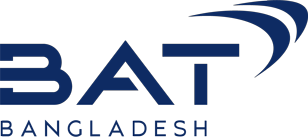
- Company type: Public limited company
- Traded as: DSE: BATBC
- Industry: Tobacco
- Founded: 1910; 116 years ago
- Headquarters: Mohakhali, Dhaka
- Key people: Mr Wael Sabra (Chairman) Ms Monisha Abraham (managing director)
- Products: Cigarettes
- Parent: British American Tobacco
- Website: batbangladesh.com

British American Tobacco Bangladesh is one of the largest multinational corporations, operated by British American Tobacco in Bangladesh. They are listed on the stock index of the Dhaka Stock Exchange and Chittagong Stock Exchange. It is doing its business over 100 years in this region. It was founded in Bangladesh in 1910. It had established its first depot at Armanitola in Dhaka. After partition in 1947, it was established in 1949. After the independence of Bangladesh from Pakistan, it was renamed as Bangladesh Tobacco Company (BTC) in 1972. But in 1998, it is again renamed as British American Tobacco Bangladesh (BATB). In Bangladesh, British American Tobacco Bangladesh has more than 1,200 people as direct employees and more than 50,000 people as indirect employees (mostly farmers).

British American Tobacco Bangladesh's motto is "success and responsibility go together". Mr Wael Sabra is the current Chairman & MS Monisha Abraham is the current managing director of BATB.

== Factory Relocation ==
British American Tobacco Bangladesh Company Limited (BAT Bangladesh) is relocating its head office and factory from Mohakhali to Ashulia starting from July 1, 2025. The new address will be: Dehora, Dhamsona, Bolivodra Bazar, Ashulia, Dhaka-1349. As the Mohakhali factory was situated in a residential area, environmental activists had long been demanding its relocation. Following a legal dispute over lease renewal, the company made this decision after the Appellate Division of the Supreme Court rejected BAT Bangladesh’s appeal.

== Brands ==
- Benson & Hedges
- John Player Gold Leaf
- Lucky Strike
- Capstan
- Star
- Royals
- Derby
- Pilot
- Hollywood
