= Bijan Taheri =

Iranian footballer and coach

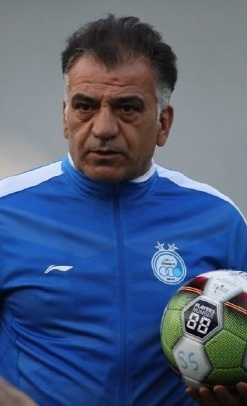
- Taheri as manager of Esteghlal in 2019

Personal information
- Date of birth: 21 March 1961 (age 65)
- Place of birth: Tehran, Iran
- Position: Midfielder

Team information
- Current team: Esteghlal (team manager)

Senior career*
Years	Team	Apps	(Gls)
1978–1981	Rah Ahan		
1981	Daraei		
1982–1987	Esteghlal		
1988–1989	Mohammedan	22	(24)
1990–1991	Al-Wakrah		
1991–1994	Bank Tejarat		
1995–1996	Saipa		
1996–1997	Shamoushak Noshahr		

International career
1982–1987	Iran	5	(1)

Managerial career
- 2000–2001: Saipa U21
- 2004–2005: Saipa U21
- 2008–2009: Armin Tehran
- 2007–2008: Steel Azin (assistant)
- 2007–2007: Mes Kerman (assistant)
- 2007–2008: Gostaresh Foolad (assistant)
- 2017–2019: Esteghlal (assistant)
- 2021–2023: Esteghlal (team manager)
- 2024: Kavir Moghava (team manager)
- 2025–: Esteghlal (team manager)
- * Club domestic league appearances and goals

Bijan Taheri (Persian: بیژن طاهری; born 21 March 1961) is an Iranian football coach and retired player.
