= Mamun Joarder =

Bangladeshi footballer (born 1968)

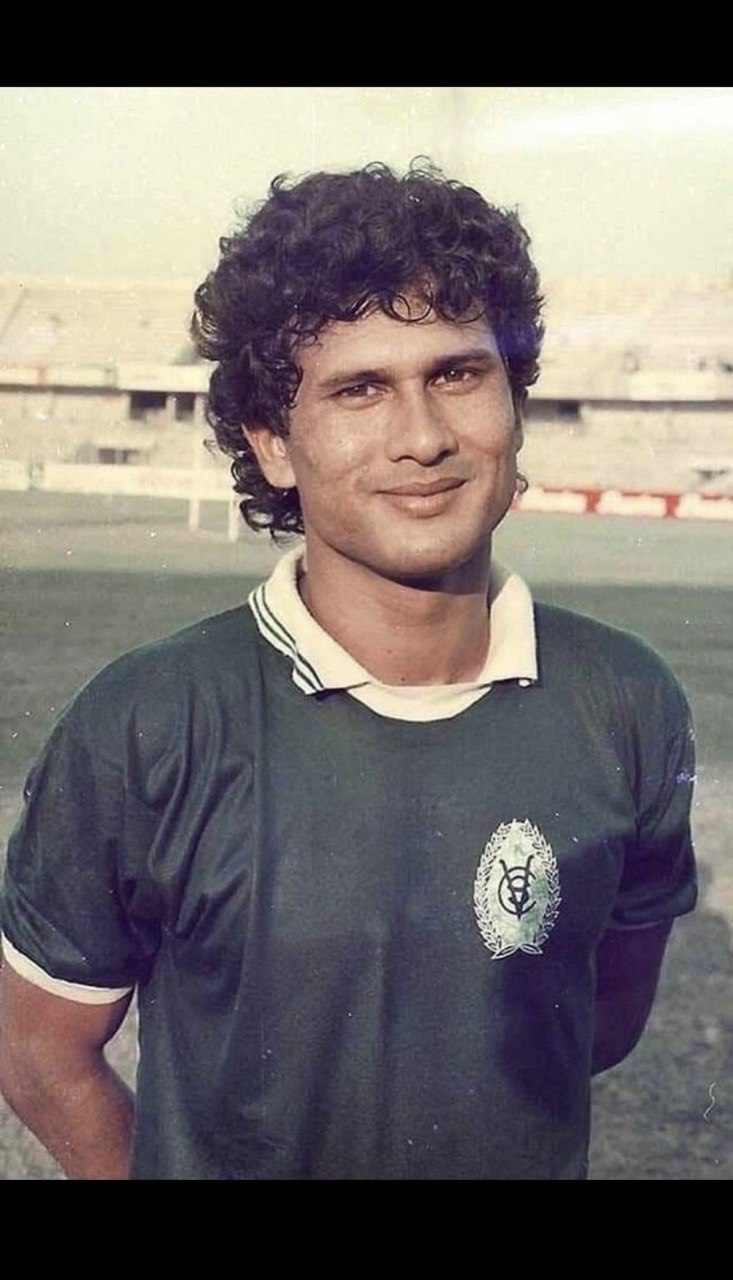
- Mamun posing for Victoria SC

Personal information
- Full name: Mamun Hossain Joarder
- Date of birth: 17 February 1968 (age 58)
- Place of birth: Chuadanga, Khulna, Bangladesh
- Height: 1.68 m (5 ft 6 in)
- Positions: Right winger; right wing-back

Senior career*
Years	Team	Apps	(Gls)
1985–1986	Azad		
1986–1987	Mirpur Cholontika		
1987–1988	Wari		
1988–1990	Victoria		
1990–1992	Mohammedan		
1992–1994	Dhaka Abahani		
1994–1997	Muktijoddha		
1997–1999	Dhaka Abahani		
2000	Muktijoddha		

International career
1990	Bangladesh U19	4	(3)
1991	Bangladesh U23	8	(2)
1990–1997	Bangladesh	33	(7)
Medal record
Men's football
Representing Bangladesh
South Asian Games
Bronze medal – third place	1991 Colombo
Silver medal – second place	1995 Madras
SAFF Championship
Runner-up	1995 Colombo
- * Club domestic league appearances and goals

Mamun Joarder (Bengali: মামুন জোয়ার্দার; born 17 February 1968) is a retired Bangladeshi footballer who played as either a right-winger or right wing-back. Mamun played for a total of 7 clubs during his 15-year-long career, and won the Dhaka Premier Division League title with both Abahani Limited Dhaka and Muktijoddha Sangsad KC.

Mamun was also a member of the Bangladesh national team that won its first international trophy, the Burma Cup in 1995, under coach Otto Pfister. He went on to represent his country from 1990 to 1997, scoring a total of 6 recorded goals.

== Early life ==
Mamun Jaorder was born in Chuadanga District of Khulna Division, Bangladesh on 17 February 1968. His father, Alfaz Uddin Joardar, was a footballer during the British regime. His brother, Abdul Qadir Joardar, played in the 1978 edition of the Aga Khan Gold Cup. Growing up Mamun was a Mohammedan SC supporter. Both his father and brothers had encouraged Mamun to go to Dhaka, in order to become a professional footballer.

== Club career ==
=== Early career ===
Mamun Joarder started his youth career in Chuadanga, after passing various stages of selection of U-16 footballers he came to Dhaka to take part in the divisional league final match for Khulna Division. After impressing the national team scouts present during the final, Mamun got called up for the Bangladesh U-16 national team training camp. However, he was not picked for the final squad. Mamun later went on to play for the U-19 national team. In 1985, Azad Sporting Club coach Anjam gave Mamun the opportunity to play the last two matches of the Dhaka First Division League season. Mamun then went on to play for Mirpur Chalantika and Wari Club over the next couple of years. In 1988 Mamun joined mid-table side Victoria SC after doing well in his second season at the club, he earned a move to domestic giants Mohammedan SC in 1990.

=== Mohammedan SC ===
Abdus Salam Murshedy, who was the director of Mohammedan at the time, signed Mamun, after being impressed with his performance with Victoria SC during his second season at the club. Mamun, played for Mohammedan in the Ma-Moni Gold Cup, BTC Club Cup, Independence Cup, 1990–91 Asian Cup Winners' Cup, in Saudi Arabia. He was a vital player for Mohammedan during the 1990–91 Asian Club Championship which took place in Dhaka. Mamun scored goals against Club Lagoons from Maldives and Salgaocar SC of India, in the group stages, helping Mohammedan reach the quarter-final round, becoming the first Bangladeshi club to do so. For that, he was awarded the best player of tournament, with the verdict of Sports Writers Association.

However, Mamun did not get a chance to play with Mohammedan in the First Division, Iranian coach Nasser Hejazi who was the manager of Mohammedan at the time, preferred to play the country's poster boy at the time, Sabbir, at the left wing position instead of Mamun, and after developing an uncertainty over his game time at the club, Mamun decided to leave Mohammedan. Although the club's director Salam Murshedy offered Mamun a salary of Tk 12 lakh per season, Mamun decided to join arch-rivals Abahani Limited Dhaka for a lower salary of Tk 11 lakh in 1992. Mamun was heavily criticized by both the media and Mohammedan fans due to his sudden transfer to fellow title contenders. He also represented Brothers Union as a guest player at the 1992–93 Asian Club Championship.

=== Abahani Limited Dhaka ===
Abahani manager Kazi Salahuddin signed Mamun in order to replace legendary winger Kazi Anwar, and upon sigining he was guaranteed a starting spot in the team. During the 1992 league season, when the two clubs met in the Dhaka Derby, Abahani only needed a draw to claim the league title. However, Mohammedan took the lead early on the game, Abahani manager Salahuddin had named Mamun on the bench due to allegations of match fixing. Mamun came on to the field with 35 minutes left in the second half and within a few minutes after coming on, he scored the equalizer after a deflected header from teammate Sheikh Aslam fell to his feet. Mamun scored again after 5 minutes, this time he dribbled past 2 Mohammedan defenders to slot the ball into the net by beating goalkeeper Sayeed Hassan Kanan. The game ended 2–1 and Mamun won his first league trophy with Abahani.

In 1994, Mamun also scored against Kolkata Mohammedan, as Abahani won India's Charms Cup trophy, defeating the Kolkata side 2–0 in the final. During his time at the club Mamun developed a great partnership with Russian midfielder Sergey Zhukov. Along with Zhukov, Abahani had local star players such as Monem Munna, Rezaul Karim Rehan, Alamgir Hasan and Rizvi Karim Rumi, who helped them dominate the league that year. However, at the end of 1994 all four of them (except Monem Munna) including Mamun left Abahani to join Muktijoddha Sangsad KC, after the country's top three clubs Mohammedan, Abahani and Brothers Union made a gentleman's agreement to lower the salaries of lower the salaries of their star players.

=== Muktijoddha Sangsad KC ===
Manjur Kader who was in charge of Muktijoddha Sangsad signed 11 national team players alongside Mamun, in order to beat the country's top three teams to the Premier Division title. However, even after the heavy spending Mamun was not able to help his team win the league as, his former club Abahani clinched the title. Although the club failed to win the league, Mamun created a lethal partnership with Imtiaz Ahmed Nakib, both at club and national team, his assists helped Nakib become Mukitojoddha's all-time top scorer. Mamun's only trophy for the "freedom fighters" during his first stint at the club was the 1994 Federation Cup, which he won by defeating Abahani 3–2 in the final. And after 4 years at the club, he returned to Abahani Limited, in 1997.

=== Final years & Retirement ===
In 1997, Mamun made his return to Abahani Limited, however, he was not able to win the league title on his return as Muktijoddha tasted their first Premier Division triumph only a few months after Mamun's departure from the club. Mamun also sustained a massive injury during a Dhaka derby match, after his return to Abahani. During the game Mohammedan captain Kaiser Hamid and Mamun both went in for a header, and at the same time goalkeeper Kanan went in to clear the ball only to fall over Mamun and break his arm. The injury Mamun sustained along with a knee meniscus surgery turned out to be detrimental to his career and lead to him soon losing his place in the Bangladesh national team. Although Kanan had said that the fall on Mamun was accidental, Mamun later stated during an interview that he felt it was done intentionally out of revenge for the 1992 double he scored past Kanan to win Abahani the league, and in terms ending Kanan's international career.

Mamun left Abahani once again after winning a couple of Federation Cup trophies, and returned to Muktijoddha. During his final season as a player, Mamun was at last able to win the Premier Division title with Muktijoddha. On 23 August 2000, he played his final match against his former club Mohammedan in the Federation Cup at the Bangabandhu National Stadium.

=== Interest from Malaysia ===
During his time at Abahani, Mamun attracted interest from an unknown club from the Malaysian Professional League. However, Abahani officials did not allow him to move, and due to the influence of Abahani, the Bangladesh Football Federation was not able to give him the clearance to complete the transfer.

== International career ==
After playing for the Bangladesh U19, Mamun was called up to the Bangladesh U23 team which would compete in the 1992 Summer Olympics qualifiers in May 1991. During the qualifying games Mamun had developed a formidable partnership with striker Imtiaz Ahmed Nakib, his assists helped Nakib score a total of 8 goals in the 8 matches that where played, he also managed to assist Nakib's winner against Malaysia U23. Mamun also found the net twice when Bangladesh thrashed Philippines U23 8–0. However, with 3 wins from 9 matches, Bangladesh finished fifth in the group and failed to qualify for the main tournament.

Mamun made his senior national team debut for Bangladesh during the 1990 Asian Games against Saudi Arabia, on 24 September 1990. He was later selected for the 1991 South Asian Games, after impressing for the Olympic side at the 1992 Summer Olympics qualifiers, earlier during the year. On 28 December 1991, Mamun scored his first senior goal for his country as Bangladesh secured bronze in the South Asian Games, defeating Nepal 2–0. Mamun was also vital for his country during the 1994 FIFA World Cup qualifiers, scoring 3 goals over 5 games which he played. The team's coach at the time, Kazi Salahuddin, put Mamun on the bench during the qualifying game against Thailand stating "Mamun, this team is not mine. It's a party imposed from above". Nonetheless, Mamun managed to score after coming on in the second half as Bangladesh lost 4–1. During the last game of the qualifiers against Sri Lanka, Mamun scored a brace as Bangladesh won 3–0.

In 1994, Mamun participated in the Qatar Independence Cup with Muktijoddha Sangsad KC, representing the national team. The 1995 Burma Cup held in October of that year in Myanmar saw one of Mamun's best performances for the national team. Although Bangladesh started the tournament with a 4–0 defeat to hosts Myanmar, they managed to win the following two games to reach the final where they faced Myanmar once again. In the final, on 4 November 1995, Mamun opened the scoring for Bangladesh, and Nakib scored the game-deciding goal as Bangladesh won their first-ever international trophy.

Mamun's last recorded goal for Bangladesh came against Nepal in the 1995 South Asian Games held in India. He scored a long-range strike to win Bangladesh the game 2–1, however, he was unable to help the country win gold as they lost the final of the tournament to hosts India 1–0. Mamun played his last international tournament during the country's disappointing 1997 SAFF Championship in Nepal, where they were knocked out in the group stage, ending bottom of the group.

== Personal life ==
Following his retirement from football in 2000 with Muktijoddha Sangsad KC, Mamun moved to Canada with his wife and 3 children.

== Career statistics ==
=== International ===
Appearances and goals by national team and year
National team	Year	Apps	Goals
Bangladesh
Bangladesh	1990	2	0
Bangladesh	1991	3	1
Bangladesh	1992	1	0
Bangladesh	1993	10	4
Bangladesh	1994	2	0
Bangladesh	1995	10	2
Bangladesh	1997	5	0
Total		33	7

=== International goals ===
==== Youth ====
Scores and results list Bangladesh's goal tally first.

#	Date	Venue	Opponent	Score	Result	Competition
1.	31 May 1990	Dhaka Stadium, Dhaka	South Korea	1–1	1–1	1990 AFC Youth Championship Qualifiers
2.	2 June 1990	Dhaka Stadium, Dhaka	Pakistan		4–1	1990 AFC Youth Championship Qualifiers
3.	2 June 1990	Dhaka Stadium, Dhaka	Pakistan		4–1	1990 AFC Youth Championship Qualifiers
4.	24 May 1991	Seoul Olympic Stadium, Seoul	Philippines	6–0	8–0	Olympic Football Qualification
5.	24 May 1991	Seoul Olympic Stadium, Seoul	Philippines	7–0	8–0	Olympic Football Qualification

==== Senior ====
Scores and results list Bangladesh's goal tally first.

#	Date	Venue	Opponent	Score	Result	Competition
1.	28 December 1991	Sugathadasa Stadium, Colombo	Nepal	2–0	2–0	1991 SA Games
2.	18 April 1993	Yokohama, Tokyo	Thailand	1–3	1–4	1994 FIFA World Cup qualifiers
3.	7 May 1993	Yokohama, Tokyo	Sri Lanka	1–0	3–0	1994 FIFA World Cup qualifiers
4.	7 May 1993	Yokohama, Tokyo	Sri Lanka	3–0	3–0	1994 FIFA World Cup qualifiers
5.	13 December 1993	Mirpur Stadium, Dhaka	Myanmar	2–1	3–1	Friendly
6.	4 November 1995	Thuwunna Stadium, Yangon	Myanmar	1–1	2–1	Burma Cup
7.	23 December 1995	Jawaharlal Nehru Stadium, Madras	Nepal	2–0	2–1	1995 SA Games

=== International goals for club ===
==== Mohammedan SC ====
Scores and results list Dhaka Mohammedan goal tally first.

#	Date	Venue	Opponent	Score	Result	Competition
1.	19 July 1990	Bangabandhu National Stadium, Dhaka	(Maldives) Club Lagoons	1–1	5–0	AFC Champions League
2.	21 July 1990	Bangabandhu National Stadium, Dhaka	(India) Salgaocar SC	1–1	2–1	AFC Champions League
3.	1 June 1991	Bangabandhu National Stadium, Dhaka	(Bangladesh) Brothers Union	3–1	4–1	1991 BTC Club Cup
4.	1 June 1991	Bangabandhu National Stadium, Dhaka	(Bangladesh) Brothers Union	4–1	4–1	1991 BTC Club Cup

==== Abahani Limited Dhaka ====
Scores and results list Abahani Limited Dhaka goal tally first.

#	Date	Venue	Opponent	Score	Result	Competition
1.	1994	Kolkata, India	(Bangladesh) Dhaka Mohammedan	1–0	1–0	Charms Cup Semi-Final
2.	1994	Kolkata, India	(India) Kolkata Mohammedan	1–0	2–0	Charms Cup Final

== Honours ==
Mohammedan SC

- Ma-O-Moni Gold Cup: 1990

Abahani Limited

- Dhaka Premier Division League: 1994
- Federation Cup: 1997, 1999
- Charms Cup (India): 1991

Muktijoddha Sangsad

- Dhaka Premier Division League: 2000
- Federation Cup: 1994

Bangladesh

- South Asian Games Silver medal: 1995; Bronze medal: 1991
- Four-nation Invitational Football Tournament: 1995

== Bibliography ==
- Alam, Masud (2017). ফুটবলের গল্প ফুটবলারদের গল্প (transl. The story of football the story of footballers) (in Bengali). Bishhoshahitto Bhobon. ISBN 9789849134688.
- Tariq, T Islam (2025). মোহামেডান-আবাহনী ময়দানি লড়াই (transl. Mohammedan-Abahani field battle) (in Bengali). Annesha Prokashon. ISBN 978-984-99475-1-6.
- Dulal, Mahmud (2020). খেলার মাঠে মুক্তিযুদ্ধ (transl. Liberation war in the playground) (in Bengali). Bishhoshahitto Bhobon. ISBN 978-984-8218-31-0.
