= Golam Gauss =

Bangladeshi footballer

Personal information
- Full name: Golam Mohammad Gaus
- Date of birth: 12 May 1969 (age 57)
- Place of birth: Narayanganj, East Pakistan (present-day Bangladesh)
- Position: Winger

Youth career
- 1983: Narayanganj BIWTC
- 1984: Sher-e-Bangla Club

Senior career*
| Years | Team | Apps | (Gls) |
| 1986–1991 | PWD | | |
| 1991 | East Bengal | | |
| 1991–1996 | Dhaka Abahani | | |
| 1997–1999 | Muktijoddha | | |

International career
| 1986 | Bangladesh U16 | | |
| 1991 | Bangladesh U23 | | |
| 1991–1993 | Bangladesh | 10 | (0) |
Medal record
Representing Bangladesh
South Asian Games
| Bronze medal – third place | 1991 |
- * Club domestic league appearances and goals

Golam Gauss (Bengali: গোলাম গাউস; born 12 May 1969) is a retired Bangladeshi footballer who represented the Bangladesh national team between 1991 and 1993.

== Early life ==
Born in the Masdair Gabtoli area of Narayanganj Sadar Upazila, Gauss was raised among three brothers. His eldest brother, Alam Babu, played in the Dhaka First Division League for Azad Sporting Club in the late '70s. Gauss was an amateur sprinter and earned first place in the 100-meter, 200-meter, and 400-meter races in school athletics.

== Club career ==
In 1983, Gauss played in the Pioneer League for Narayanganj BIWTC, and the following year, he participated in the Narayanganj Second Division with Sher-e-Bangla Club. His performances during the Caravan Cup under-16 tournament for Narayanganj District saw him being called for trials at PWD SC by coach Shamsuzzoha Chad. In 1986, Gauss made his Dhaka Premier Division League debut for PWD, scoring with his first touch, a free-kick against Dhaka Mohammedan.

Gauss represented Mohammedan as a guest player during the 1990–91 Asian Club Championship. He also played for Abahani Limited Dhaka as a guest player during the club's Sait Nagjee Trophy triumph in India in 1989. He also scored the winning goal for Abahani against arch-rivals, Dhaka Mohammedan during the BTC Club Cup final held in Dhaka in 1991. During the same tournament he scored against Kolkata Mohammedan in the group-stages. Following the tournament, he along with numerous other players from Bangladesh were brought to East Bengal Club to participate in the Calcutta League.

In his debut game in Kolkata, Gauss assisted a goal by Krishanu Dey against Kolkata Mohammedan. East Bengal eventually won the league title with a team consisting of Gauss, Monem Munna and Sheikh Mohammad Aslam. He returned to Dhaka the same year, joining Abahani on a permanent deal. With the Sky blues, Gauss won three league titiles in 1992, 1994 and 1995. After representing Abahani for six years, Gauss joined Muktijoddha Sangsad KC in 1997, and helped the club win its first ever league title in his debut season. He played for the club until his retirement in 1999.

== International career ==
Gauss entered the Bangladesh U16 team under PWD coach Shamsuzzoha Chad, during the 1986 AFC U-16 Championship in Doha, Qatar. He also represented the first Bangladesh U23 team during the 1992 Summer Olympics – Men's Asian Qualifiers held jointly in Seoul and Kuala Lumpur.

Gauss represented the Bangladesh national team from 1991 to 1993, during which he played in both the 1991 South Asian Games and 1993 South Asian Games. He also featured in two games during the 1994 FIFA World Cup qualification – AFC first round under coach Kazi Salahuddin.

== Personal life ==
=== Arrest ===
On 29 December 2020, Gauss was arrested by the Bangladesh Police and was held at Fatullah Model Police Station before eventually being handed a three-year jail sentence for two cases against him, including attempted murder and absconding while accused. According to interviews conducted with local residents of the Fatullah area of Narayanganj Sadar Upazila, Gauss was accused of engaging in terrorist activities in the area, and he reportedly physically attacked anyone who disapproved.

== Career statistics ==
=== International ===
Appearances and goals by national team and year
| National team | Year | Apps | Goals |
|---|---|---|---|
Bangladesh
| Bangladesh | 1991 | 1 | 0 |
| Bangladesh | 1992 | 1 | 0 |
| Bangladesh | 1993 | 8 | 0 |
| Bangladesh | Total | 10 | 0 |

== Honours ==
Dhaka Abahani

- Dhaka Premier Division League : 1991–92, 1994, 1995
- Charms Cup : 1994
- DMFA Cup : 1991
- BTC Club Cup: 1991
- Sait Nagjee Trophy : 1989

Muktijoddha

- Dhaka Premier Division League : 1997–98
- Mahanagari Cup: 1997
- McDowell's Cup : 1998

East Bengal Club

- Calcutta First Division League : 1991

Bangladesh

- South Asian Games Bronze medal: 1991

== Bibliography ==
- Dulal, Mahmud (2020). খেলার মাঠে মুক্তিযুদ্ধ (transl. Liberation war in the playground) (in Bengali). Bishhoshahitto Bhobon. ISBN 978-984-8218-31-0.
- Alam, Masud (2017). ফুটবলের গল্প ফুটবলারদের গল্প (transl. The story of football the story of footballers) (in Bengali). Bishhoshahitto Bhobon. ISBN 9789849134688.
