= Barun Bikash Dewan =

Bangladeshi footballer

Personal information
- Full name: Barun Bikash Dewan
- Date of birth: 1 February 1969 (age 57)
- Place of birth: Rangamati, Bangladesh
- Positions: Right midfielder; full-back

Senior career*
Years	Team	Apps	(Gls)
1988–1990	Muktijoddha Sangsad		
1990–1994	Mohammedan SC		
1994–1995	Muktijoddha Sangsad		
1995–1999	Dhaka Abahani		
1999	Brothers Union		

International career
1988	Bangladesh U16		
1990	Bangladesh U19		
1991	Bangladesh U23		
1990–1995	Bangladesh		
- * Club domestic league appearances and goals

Barun Bikash Dewan (Bengali: বরুন বিকাশ দেওয়ান; born 1 February 1969) is a retired Bangladeshi footballer who played as a right-midfielder. He represented the Bangladesh national team between 1990 and 1995.

== Club career ==
In 1988, Barun began his career with Muktijoddha Sangsad KC in the Dhaka Premier Division League. In 1991, he played as a guest player for Abahani Limited Dhaka in the BTC Club Cup. He won the league in both 1993 and 1995, with Abahani and Mohammedan SC, respectively. He retired after playing for Brothers Union in 1999.

== International career ==
Barun represented in youth level at the 1988 AFC U-16 Championship qualifiers and 1990 AFC Youth Championship qualifiers. In the former, Barun managed to score in a 1–1 draw against India U16. He eventually made his debut for the Bangladesh national team during the 1990 Asian Games held in Beijing, China. Barun was also part of the first Bangladesh U23 team during the 1992 Summer Olympics qualifiers. In 1994, he was part of the Muktijoddha Sangsad KC team that represented Bangladesh in the Qatar Independence Cup. In 1995, he won the 4-nation Tiger Trophy in Myanmar, which was the country's first international trophy.

== Personal life ==
Barun's elder brother Arun Bikash Dewan and nephew Kingsuk Chakma were both footballers who played in the Dhaka Premier Division League.

In 2010, he was elected general Secretary of Rangamati District Sports Association (RDSA).

In 2015, Barun was awarded with the National Sports Award.

== Honours ==
Mohammedan SC

- Dhaka Premier Division League: 1993
- Independence Cup: 1991
- Ma-O-Moni Gold Cup: 1990

Muktijoddha Sangsad KC

- Federation Cup: 1994

Abahani Limited Dhaka

- BTC Club Cup: 1991
- Dhaka Premier Division League: 1995
- Federation Cup: 1997

Bangladesh

- 4-nation Tiger Trophy: 1995

=== Awards and accolades ===
- 2015 − National Sports Award
