= 1990–91 Asian Club Championship =

10th edition of premier club football tournament organized by the AFC

1990–1991 Asian Club Championship
Tournament details
- Dates: 1 July 1990 – 29 July 1991
- Teams: 21
- Venue: Dhaka (final rounds)

Final positions
- Champions: (Iran) Esteghlal (2nd title)
- Runners-up: (China) Liaoning FC
- Third place: (Indonesia) Pelita Jaya Jakarta
- Fourth place: (North Korea) April 25

Tournament statistics
- Matches played: 30
- Goals scored: 73 (2.43 per match)
- Top scorer(s): Samad Marfavi (6 goals)
- Best player: Abbas Sarkhab
- Best young player: Majid Namjoo-Motlagh
- Best goalkeeper: Ahmad Reza Abedzadeh

The 1990–91 Asian Club Championship was the 10th edition of the annual Asian club football competition hosted by Asian Football Confederation. Representative clubs of 30 Asian countries played games in this tournament. Esteghlal FC from Iran won the final and became Asian champions for the second time. They are championed in 1970 as Taj.

== Group stage ==
=== Group 1 ===
Pos	Team	Pld	W	D	L	GF	GA	GD	Pts	Qualification
1	(Iraq) Al-Rasheed (H)	2	2	0	0	3	1	+2	4	Qualify to Quarter-finals
2	(Jordan) Al-Ramtha	2	1	0	1	4	3	+1	2	
3	(Yemen) Al-Yarmook	2	0	0	2	1	4	−3	0	

Source: RSSSF
(H) Hosts

Played in Baghdad, Iraq

22 July 1990

Al-Rasheed (Iraq)	1–0	(Yemen) Al-Yarmook

24 July 1990

Al-Ramtha (Jordan)	3–1	(Yemen) Al-Yarmook

26 July 1990

Al-Rasheed (Iraq)	2–1	(Jordan) Al-Ramtha

=== Group 2 ===
Team 1	Agg.	Team 2	1st leg	2nd leg
Esteghlal (Iran)	2–1	(Qatar) Al-Sadd	1–1	1–0

27 July 1990

Al-Sadd (Qatar)	1–1	(Iran) Esteghlal
Namjoo-Moltagh 48'		Marfavi 4'

3 August 1990

Esteghlal (Iran)	1–0	(Qatar) Al-Sadd
Marfavi 86'

Esteghlal qualified 2–1 on aggregate.

=== Group 3 ===
The Gulf Cooperation Council Club was cancelled due to the crisis in the region; the participants would have been Bahrain Club, (Kuwait) Al-Arabi, (Saudi Arabia) Al-Nassr and (United Arab Emirates) Al-Sharjah, who all withdrew.

=== Group 4 ===
Pos	Team	Pld	W	D	L	GF	GA	GD	Pts	Qualification
1	(Oman) Al-Nasr	2	1	1	0	2	0	+2	3	Qualify to Quarter-finals
2	Pakistan Airlines (H)	2	1	1	0	1	0	+1	3	
3	(Nepal) Ranipokhari	2	0	0	2	0	3	−3	0	

Source: RSSSF
(H) Hosts

Played in Quetta, Pakistan

13 July 1990

Pakistan Airlines	1–0	(Nepal) Ranipokhari

Ayub National Stadium, Quetta, Pakistan

15 July 1990

Al-Nasr (Oman)	2–0	(Nepal) Ranipokhari
Awadh 52'; Faiz Rahman 89'

Ayub National Stadium, Quetta, Pakistan

17 July 1990

Pakistan Airlines	0–0	(Oman) Al-Nasr

Ayub National Stadium, Quetta, Pakistan

=== Group 5 ===
Pos	Team	Pld	W	D	L	GF	GA	GD	Pts	Qualification
1	(Bangladesh) Mohammedan SC (H)	2	2	0	0	7	1	+6	4	Qualify to Quarter-finals
2	(India) Salgaocar SC	2	1	0	1	4	2	+2	2	
3	(Maldives) Club Lagoons	2	0	0	2	0	8	−8	0	

Source: RSSSF
(H) Hosts

Played in Dhaka, Bangladesh

17 July 1990

Salgaocar SC (India)	3–0	(Maldives) Club Lagoons
Coutinho 34'; Barreto 65', 67'

Dhaka Stadium, Bangladesh
Referee: Soum Shreshta (Nepal)

19 July 1990

Mohammedan SC (Bangladesh)	5–0	(Maldives) Club Lagoons
Mamun 41'; Nakib 54', 65'; Naseem 73' (o.g.); Titu 87'

Dhaka Stadium, Bangladesh
Referee: Piron Anprasar (Thailand)

21 July 1990

Mohammedan SC (Bangladesh)	2–1	(India) Salgaocar SC
Mamun 14'; Nakib 32'		Barreto 63'

Dhaka Stadium, Bangladesh
Referee: Chouchai Boyabuch (Thailand)

=== Group 6 ===
Run parallel with ASEAN Club Championship

Pos	Team	Pld	W	D	L	GF	GA	GD	Pts	Qualification
1	(Indonesia) Pelita Jaya	2	1	1	0	2	1	+1	3	Qualify to Quarter-finals
2	(Thailand) Bangkok Bank	2	1	0	1	3	3	0	2	Qualify to Quarter-finals
3	(Singapore) Geylang International (H)	2	0	1	1	1	2	−1	1	

Source: RSSSF
(H) Hosts

Played in Singapore

10 September 1990

Pelita Jaya (Indonesia)	2–1	(Thailand) Bangkok Bank
Bambang Nurdiansyah 61'; Alexander Saununu 74'		Chalermwoot Sa-ngapol 26'

Toa Payoh Stadium, Singapore

12 September 1990

Geylang International (Singapore)	0–0	(Indonesia) Pelita Jaya

Toa Payoh Stadium, Singapore
Referee: Major Kamaruddin

14 September 1990

Geylang International (Singapore)	1–2	(Thailand) Bangkok Bank

=== Group 7 ===
Pos	Team	Pld	W	D	L	GF	GA	GD	Pts	Qualification
1	(North Korea) April 25 (H)	2	2	0	0	2	0	+2	4	Qualify to Quarter-finals
2	(China) Liaoning FC	2	1	0	1	3	3	0	2	Qualify to Quarter-finals
3	(Japan) Nissan Yokohama	2	0	0	2	2	4	−2	0	

Source: RSSSF
(H) Hosts

Played in Pyongyang, North Korea

1 July 1990

April 25 (North Korea)	1–0	(Japan) Nissan Yokohama

3 July 1990

Liaoning FC (China)	3–2	(Japan) Nissan Yokohama

5 July 1990

April 25 (North Korea)	1–0	(China) Liaoning FC

== Quarter-finals ==
Played in Dhaka, Bangladesh

=== Group A ===
Pos	Team	Pld	W	D	L	GF	GA	GD	Pts	Qualification
1	(China) Liaoning FC	2	1	1	0	2	1	+1	3	Advance to Semi-finals
2	(Indonesia) Pelita Jaya	2	1	0	1	3	1	+2	2	Advance to Semi-finals
3	(Oman) Al-Nasr	2	0	1	1	1	4	−3	1	

Source: RSSSF

Al Rasheed (Iraq) was dissolved and Iraqi clubs were suspended from Asian competitions shortly after due to the Gulf War. They were replaced by Al Ramtha (Jordan), who were disqualified for not paying the second round entry fee.

20 July 1991

Pelita Jaya (Indonesia)	3–0	(Oman) Al-Nasr
Bambang Nurdiansyah 34', 55'; Hambli 64'

Dhaka Stadium, Bangladesh
Referee: Rajamani Cham (Singapore)

22 July 1991

Liaoning FC (China)	1–1	(Oman) Al-Nasr
Gao Xu 78'		Mohammad Ali 30'

Dhaka Stadium, Bangladesh

24 July 1991

Liaoning FC (China)	1–0	(Indonesia) Pelita Jaya
Sun Wei 26'

Dhaka Stadium, Bangladesh
Referee: Yousef Mohammod (Bahrain)

=== Group B ===
Pos	Team	Pld	W	D	L	GF	GA	GD	Pts	Qualification
1	(Iran) Esteghlal	3	2	1	0	5	2	+3	5	Advance to Semi-finals
2	(North Korea) April 25	3	1	1	1	5	5	0	3	Advance to Semi-finals
3	(Bangladesh) Mohammedan SC (H)	3	0	3	0	2	2	0	3	
4	(Thailand) Bangkok Bank	3	0	1	2	4	7	−3	1	

Source: RSSSF
(H) Hosts
19 July 1991

Mohammedan SC (Bangladesh)	1–1	(Thailand) Bangkok Bank
Gauss 21'		Cheotchai 51'

Dhaka Stadium, Bangladesh
Referee: Shyam Shrestha (Nepal)
19 July 1991

Esteghlal (Iran)	2–1	(North Korea) April 25
Sarkhab 33'; Marfavi 36'		Park Moyna Hun 48'

Dhaka Stadium, Bangladesh
Referee: Salem Binhazim Saeed (UAE)

21 July 1991

Esteghlal (Iran)	2–0	(Thailand) Bangkok Bank
Marfavi 3', 37'

Dhaka Stadium, Bangladesh
21 July 1991

Mohammedan SC (Bangladesh)	0–0	(North Korea) April 25

Dhaka Stadium, Bangladesh
Referee: N.Subramaniam (Malaysia)

23 July 1991

April 25 (North Korea)	4–3	(Thailand) Bangkok Bank
Li Chang Tae 30', 31', 61'; Choi Won Nam 49'		Cheotchai 29', 74'; Anan Pansang 38'

Dhaka Stadium, Bangladesh
23 July 1991

Esteghlal (Iran)	1–1	(Bangladesh) Mohammedan SC
Naalchegar 65'		Kaiser 26'

Dhaka Stadium, Bangladesh
Referee: Salem Binhazim Saeed (UAE)

== Knockout Stage ==
=== Bracket ===
Semi-finals
27 July – Dhaka
(Iran) Esteghlal	2
(Indonesia) Pelita Jaya Jakarta	0
27 July – Dhaka
(China) Liaoning FC	3
(North Korea) April 25	0

Final
29 July – Dhaka
(Iran) Esteghlal	2
(China) Liaoning FC	1
Third place play-off
28 July – Dhaka
(Indonesia) Pelita Jaya Jakarta (p)	2 (7)
(North Korea) April 25	2 (6)

=== Semi-finals ===
26 July 1991

Liaoning FC (China)	3–0	(North Korea) April 25
Hong Do; Sun Wei (pen.)

Dhaka, Bangladesh
27 July 1991

Esteghlal (Iran)	2–0	(Indonesia) Pelita Jaya Jakarta
Sarkhab 21'; Bayani 25'

Dhaka, Bangladesh
Referee: N.Subramaniam (Malaysia)

=== Third Place ===
29 July 1991

Pelita Jaya (Indonesia)	2–2 (7–6p)	(North Korea) April 25
Bambang Nurdiansyah 59', 68'		An Jae Hyok 25', 35'

Dhaka, Bangladesh
Referee: Yapa Abeywansa (Sri Lanka)

=== Final ===
29 July 1991

Esteghlal (Iran)	2–1	(China) Liaoning FC
Hassanzadeh 22'; Marfavi 75'		Xu Hui 50'

Dhaka Stadium, Bangladesh
Referee: A.R. Khaleed (UAE)
- Top scorer
  - (Iran) Samad Marfavi (6 goals)
