= Alamgir Hasan =

Bangladeshi footballer (born 1974)

Personal information
- Full name: Mohammed Alamgir Hasan
- Date of birth: 3 October 1974 (age 52)
- Place of birth: Barisal, East Pakistan (present-day Bangladesh)
- Height: 1.68 m (5 ft 6 in)
- Position: Right-back

Youth career
- 1987–1989: Dhaka Abahani Jr.

Senior career*
Years	Team	Apps	(Gls)
1989–1993	Dhaka Abahani		
1994–1996	Mohammedan		

International career
1988	Bangladesh U16		
1990	Bangladesh U19		
1991	Bangladesh U23		
1992–1995	Bangladesh	7	(0)
Medal record
Representing Bangladesh
South Asian Games
Silver medal – second place	1995
- * Club domestic league appearances and goals

Alamgir Hasan (Bengali: আলমগীর হাসান; born 3 October 1974) is a retired Bangladeshi professional footballer who played as a right back. During his career he was well known for taking long throw-ins which influenced his teams attacks.

== Club career ==
Alamgir's football journey started with the prestigious 4 feet 10 inches tournament and the Dhaka Ershad Cup. After doing well in such tournaments, he joined Barisal Abahani. In the Barisal League title deciding match against Barisal Mohammedan, many players from the main brach, Dhaka Abahani were invited to play for the Barisal-based side. After the game Alamgir was invited to join the First Division League club. In late 1987, he started practicing with Abahani's junior team, he played in Abahani until 1994, and in 1989 he was promoted to the senior team. In the 1991 BTC Club Cup final against Mohammedan SC, Alamgir's long throw-in lead to Golam Gauss scoring the winner. In 1994, he joined rivals Mohammedan and retired after three seasons, having picked up an injury during his second season at the club.

== International career ==
In 1991, he played for the Bangladesh U23 at the 1992 Summer Olympics qualifiers, while for the senior team he played both the 1993 and 1995 editions of the South Asian Games. However, during the 1993 tournament coach Oldrich Svab did not let him enter the field, as he preferred Kaiser Hamid at right-back. He was also part of the national team at the 1992 AFC Asian Cup qualifiers held in Bangkok, Thailand.

== Personal life ==
In 2018, was part of a campaign which aided the Rohingya refugees in Bangladesh, alongside former players Kaiser Hamid and Sheikh Mohammad Aslam.

== Career statistics ==
=== International ===
Appearances and goals by national team and year
National team	Year	Apps	Goals
Bangladesh
Bangladesh	1993	4	0
Bangladesh	1995	3	0
Bangladesh	Total	7	0

== Honours ==
Abahani Limited Dhaka

- Dhaka First Division League: 1989–90, 1992
- Azmiri Begum Gold Cup: 1990
- Independence Cup: 1990
- BTC Club Cup: 1991
- Sait Nagjee Tournament: 1989

Mohammedan SC

- Dhaka Premier Division League: 1996
- Federation Cup: 1995

Bangladesh

- South Asian Games Silver medal: 1995
