= 1991 BTC Club Cup =

Tournament details
- Host country: Bangladesh
- Dates: 31 May–7 June 1991
- Teams: 6 (from 1 confederation)
- Venue: Dhaka Stadium

Final positions
- Champions: Dhaka Abahani (1st title)
- Runners-up: Dhaka Mohammedan

Tournament statistics
- Matches played: 9
- Goals scored: 17 (1.89 per match)
- Top scorer: 4 players (2 goals)

The 1991 BTC Club Cup was held at the Dhaka Stadium in Dhaka, Bangladesh. The tournament was organised by the Bangladesh Football Federation in aid of 1991 cyclone victims. It began on 31 May and ended on 7 June 1991.

== Venues ==
Dhaka	1991 BTC Club Cup is located in Bangladesh
Dhaka Stadium	1991 BTC Club Cup is located in Bangladesh
Capacity: 36,000	1991 BTC Club Cup is located in Bangladesh

== Participating teams ==
The tournament included the top three teams from 1989/90 season of the Dhaka First Division League and Calcutta First Division League.

Country	Club	League	1989/90 season standing
Bangladesh	Dhaka Abahani (Note: Misreported as Chittagong Abahani by RSSSF.)	Dhaka First Division League	Champion
Bangladesh	Dhaka Mohammedan	Dhaka First Division League	Runners-up
Bangladesh	Dhaka Mohammedan	Dhaka First Division League	Third-place
India	Mohun Bagan	Calcutta First Division League	Champion
India	East Bengal	Calcutta First Division League	Runners-up
India	Kolkata Mohammedan	Calcutta First Division League	Third-place

== Group stage ==
=== Group A ===
Pos	Team	Pld	W	D	L	GF	GA	GD	Pts	Qualification
1	(Bangladesh) Dhaka Mohammedan	2	1	1	0	5	2	+3	4	Advance to the semi-finals
2	(India) East Bengal	2	1	1	0	2	1	+1	4	Advance to the semi-finals
3	(Bangladesh) Brothers Union	2	0	0	2	1	5	−4	0	

Source: RSSSF
31 May 1991

East Bengal (India)	1–0	(Bangladesh) Brothers Union
Bikash (?)

Dhaka Stadium, Dhaka

1 June 1991

Dhaka Mohammedan (Bangladesh)	4–1	(Bangladesh) Brothers Union
Mizan 8'; Roksy (?); Mamun (?)		Riyaz Uddin 55'

Dhaka Stadium, Dhaka

2 June 1991

Dhaka Mohammedan (Bangladesh)	1–1	(India) East Bengal
Nakib 2'		Banerjee 42'

Dhaka Stadium, Dhaka

=== Group B ===
Pos	Team	Pld	W	D	L	GF	GA	GD	Pts	Qualification
1	(Bangladesh) Dhaka Abahani	2	1	1	0	2	1	+1	4	Advance to the semi-finals
2	(India) Mohun Bagan	2	1	1	0	1	0	+1	4	Advance to the semi-finals
3	(India) Kolkata Mohammedan	2	0	0	2	1	3	−2	0	

Source: RSSSF
31 May 1991

Mohun Bagan (India)	1–0	(India) Kolkata Mohammedan
Chatterjee 73'

Dhaka Stadium, Dhaka

1 June 1991

Mohun Bagan (India)	0–0	(Bangladesh) Dhaka Abahani

Dhaka Stadium, Dhaka

1 June 1991

Kolkata Mohammedan (India)	1–2	(Bangladesh) Dhaka Abahani
Mohammed Rahmatullah 82'		Gauss 38'; Aslam 68'

Dhaka Stadium, Dhaka

== Knockout stage ==
=== Semi-finals ===
4 June 1991

Dhaka Abahani (Bangladesh)	2–1 (a.e.t.)	(India) East Bengal
Aslam 22'; Rumi 104'		Krishanu 25'

Dhaka Stadium, Dhaka
Attendance: 60,000

5 June 1991

Dhaka Mohammedan (Bangladesh)	1–0	(India) Mohun Bagan
Nakib 21'

Dhaka Stadium, Dhaka

=== Final ===
7 June 1991
17:00 (BST)

Dhaka Abahani (Bangladesh)	1–0 (a.e.t.)	(Bangladesh) Dhaka Mohammedan
Gauss 109'

Dhaka Stadium, Dhaka
Referee: Nazir Hossain

Dhaka Abahani	Dhaka Mohammedan

GK
RB
LB
CB
CB
CB
MF
MF
LF
RF
CF
Substitutions:
MF
Head coach:
(Bangladesh) Abdul Gaffar

Mohamed Mohsin (GK)
Alamgir Hasan
Barun Bikash Dewan
Monem Munna	Booked
Rezaul Karim Rehan
Abu Yusuf
Mohamed Masoud Rana
Satyajit Das Rupu (c)
Rizvi Karim Rumi	Substituted off
Golam Gauss	109'
Sheikh Mohammad Aslam
Riyaz	Substituted on

GK	Sayeed Hassan Kanan (GK)
RB	Abul Hossain
LB	Imtiaz Sultan Johnny
CB	Kaiser Hamid (c)
CB	Jewel Rana
MF	Saiful Bari Titu
MF	Zakir Hossain		Substituted off
MF	Mahabub Hossain Roksy		Substituted off
RW	Mamun Joarder
CF	Imtiaz Ahmed Nakib
LW	Rumman Bin Wali Sabbir
Substitutions:
MF	Mostakim Wazed	Booked	Substituted on
MF	Masud Ali		Substituted on
Manager:
(Bangladesh) Mohammed Kaikobad

== Statistics ==
=== Goalscorers ===
There were 17 goals scored in 9 matches, for an average of 1.89 goals per match.

2 goals

- (Bangladesh) Golam Gauss (Dhaka Abahani)
- (Bangladesh) Sheikh Mohammad Aslam (Dhaka Abahani)
- (Bangladesh) Mamun Joarder (Dhaka Mohammedan)
- (Bangladesh) Imtiaz Ahmed Nakib (Dhaka Mohammedan)

1 goal

- (India) Krishanu Dey (East Bengal Club)
- (Bangladesh) Rizvi Karim Rumi (Dhaka Abahani)
- (India) Mohammed Rahmatullah (Mohun Bagan)
- (India) Satyajit Chatterjee (Mohun Bagan)
- (India) Prasanta Banerjee (East Bengal Club)
- (Bangladesh) Mahabub Hossain Roksy (Dhaka Mohammedan)
- (Bangladesh) Riyaz Uddin (Brothers Union)
- (Bangladesh) Mizanur Rahman Mizan (Dhaka Mohammedan)
- (India) Bikash Panji (East Bengal Club)
