= Madura United F.C. =

Association football team in Indonesia

Madura United
- Full name: Madura United Football Club
- Nicknames: Sape Kerrab (The Racing Bull)
- Short name: MDR
- Founded: 1986; 40 years ago, as Pelita Jaya; 10 January 2016; 10 years ago, as Madura United
- Ground: Gelora Ratu Pamelingan Stadium
- Capacity: 7,000
- Owner: PT Polana Bola Madura Bersatu
- President: Achsanul Qosasi
- Head coach: Zé Gomes
- League: Super League
- 2025–26: 14th of 18
- Website: maduraunitedfc.com
Home colours	Away colours

Madura United Football Club is an Indonesian professional football club. The club is based in Madura, East Java. The club currently competes in the Super League, the top tier of Indonesian football.

The current form of the club was established on 10 January 2016; the team's lineage began as Pelita Jaya in 1986, under which it won three Galatama titles in 1988–89, 1990, and 1993–94 before changing names, homebases, and ownership several times.

== History ==
=== Pelita Jaya (1986–1999) ===
The club was founded as Pelita Jaya Football Club in 1986 and was originally based in Jakarta. During its early years, Pelita Jaya became one of the successful teams in Galatama, winning three league titles in the 1988–89, 1990 and 1993–94 seasons. The club also attracted international attention through the recruitment of prominent foreign players, including Argentine forward Mario Kempes, who joined Pelita Jaya in 1993. Kempes had previously been a key figure in Argentina's triumph at the 1978 FIFA World Cup, where he scored six goals to win the tournament's Golden Boot and was awarded the Golden Ball as its best player. During his time with Pelita Jaya, he continued his playing career in Indonesia, scoring 10 goals in 15 appearances during the 1995–96 season. His arrival was part of the club's efforts to recruit internationally recognised players and raise its profile in Indonesian football.

In 1997, the club changed its name to Pelita Mastrans, before becoming Pelita Bakrie in 1998 following changes in its ownership and sponsorship. The club continued to compete in Indonesian football under the Pelita name until the end of the decade.

=== Relocations and name changes (2000–2015) ===
In 2000, the club relocated to Surakarta and became known as Pelita Solo. It moved again in 2002 to Cilegon, adopting the name Pelita Krakatau Steel. In 2006, the club relocated to Purwakarta and became Pelita Jaya Purwakarta, before moving to Bandung in 2008 as Pelita Jabar. The following year, it relocated to Karawang and adopted the name Pelita Jaya Karawang.

In 2012, the club returned to Bandung and was renamed Pelita Bandung Raya (PBR). The move followed changes in the club's ownership and the abandonment of a proposed merger with Arema after Bakrie Group sold off the club in favor of purchasing Arema instead. During this period, the club competed in the Indonesia Super League, with its results varying across seasons. In 2015, it was rebranded as Persipasi Bandung Raya and moved its home base to Bekasi. The club was intended to participate in the 2015 Indonesia Super League, but the competition was abandoned following the suspension of Indonesian football by FIFA.

=== Madura United (2016–present) ===
On 10 January 2016, an agreement was reached with the previous owner of Persipasi Bandung Raya, Ari Dewanto Sutedi, and Husodo Angkosubroto, witnessed by the founder of Pelita Jaya, Nirwan Dermawan Bakrie, that the ownership of Persipasi Bandung Raya (PBR) was to be taken over and moved to Madura. The club was rebranded as Madura United. After the purchase, Madura United replaced PBR to compete in the 2016 Indonesia Soccer Championship A.Madura United made its debut in the 2016 Indonesia Soccer Championship A, finishing third in the league.

In April 2017, Madura United signed former Nigerian international forward Peter Odemwingie as a marquee player ahead of the newly established 2017 Liga 1 season. The former West Bromwich Albion and Stoke City player signed a one-year contract after being unveiled in Jakarta on 3 April. He scored 15 league goals during the season, becoming one of the club's leading scorers helping the club finishing sixth in its first season.

Madura United later finished eighth in 2018 before improving to fifth in 2019. The club's early Liga 1 campaigns established it as a regular participant in the upper half of Indonesian football, although it did not win the league title.

==== Liga 1 campaigns (2020–2023) ====
The 2020 Liga 1 season was suspended and ultimately declared void because of the COVID-19 pandemic. When the competition resumed in the 2021–22 season, Madura United finished ninth. The club improved to eighth in the 2022–23 season, continuing to compete in the top division while seeking to challenge for higher league positions.

==== First league final and continental debut (2023–2025) ====
Madura United achieved its best Liga 1 campaign in the 2023–24 season, reaching the championship series final after defeating Borneo Samarinda 4–2 on aggregate in the semi-finals. In the final, Dewa United faced Persib Bandung, losing 6–1 on aggregate after defeats in both legs. Despite missing out on the title, reaching the final marked a significant milestone in the club's history and secured qualification for the 2024–25 AFC Challenge League, the club first continental campaign.

In 2024, fresh off their 2023–24 Liga 1 runner-up finish, Madura United participated in the inaugural 2024–25 AFC Challenge League tournament being placed in Group E alongside Cambodian club Preah Khan Reach Svay Rieng and Mongolian club SP Falcons where the club played both of their match in Ulaanbaatar. On 27 October 2024, Madura United faced SP Falcons in a goalless contest at the MFF Football Centre with both team sharing the points. In the next match, Madura United defeated Preah Khan Reach Svay Rieng 2–1 and advanced to the quarter-finals as the group leaders, facing off against Taiwanese club Tainan City where Madura United was caught with a goalless draw in the first leg at the Kaohsiung Nanzih Football Stadium. In the second leg, Madura United went on to win the match 3–0 thus qualifying to the semi-finals. However, Madura United campaign came to an end in the semi-final round, after losing 3–6 on aggregate against Cambodian club Preah Khan Reach Svay Rieng.

Madura United continued competing in Indonesia's top division during the 2025–26 season, which was played under the revamp name Super League. The club finished 14th, following consecutive seasons in which it had struggled to reproduce the form that took it to the 2023–24 championship series final. Madura United entered the 2026–27 season seeking to improve its league performance and re-establish itself among Indonesia's more competitive clubs.

== Team image ==
=== Name changes ===
- 1986–1996: Pelita Jaya; home base in Lebak Bulus Stadium, Jakarta
- 1997: Pelita Mastrans
- 1998–1999: Pelita Bakrie
- 2000–2002: Pelita Solo; home base in Manahan Stadium, Solo
- 2002–2006: Pelita Krakatau Steel; home base in Krakatau Steel Stadium, Cilegon
- 2006–2008: Pelita Jaya Purwakarta; home base in Purnawarman Stadium, Purwakarta
- 2008–2009: Pelita Jabar; home base in Si Jalak Harupat Stadium, Bandung
- 2009–2012: Pelita Jaya Karawang; home base in Singaperbangsa Stadium, Karawang
- 2012–2014: Pelita Bandung Raya; home base in Si Jalak Harupat Stadium, Bandung
- 2015: Persipasi Bandung Raya; home base in Patriot Chandrabhaga Stadium, Bekasi
- 2016–present: Madura United; home base in Gelora Ratu Pamelingan Stadium, Pamekasan

=== Supporters ===
Madura United's supporters are based across the four regencies of Madura Island, with each group representing a different part of the island. K-Conk Mania is associated with Bangkalan, Trunojoyo Mania with Sampang, Taretan Dhibi with Pamekasan, and Peccot Mania with Sumenep. These groups originated from the island's local football communities, with some having supported other Madurese clubs before the establishment of Madura United in 2016.

The four groups have been associated with Suporter Madura Bersatu (SMB), a collective identity that brings together supporters from across the island. Despite their separate regional bases, they unite to support Madura United during league matches and other competitions. Their presence at home and away fixtures, often accompanied by club-coloured clothing, banners and coordinated displays, reflects the club's wider connection with the Madurese community.

K-Conk Mania, one of the club's prominent supporter groups, was established on 4 June 2009 and initially supported Perseba Bangkalan. Following Madura United's formation, the group became involved in supporting the new club, although its relationship with the team was not always uninterrupted. In 2016, K-Conk Mania boycotted Madura United's matches during the Indonesia Soccer Championship A, while the other major supporter groups continued attending games. The group subsequently resumed its support, including organised displays and attendance at matches away from Madura.

The supporters have also played a role in expressing expectations of the club's management and players. In November 2021, representatives from several supporter groups met club officials to raise concerns about the team's results and request changes to the coaching staff and squad. Such actions demonstrate that the supporter groups are not only present at matches but also engage with the club over its sporting performance and direction.

== Kit manufacturers ==
Period	Kit manufacturer
2010–2011	(Italy) Lotto
2011–2012	(England) Umbro
2012–2014	(England) Mitre
2015–2016	(Indonesia) MBB
2017	(Japan) Mizuno
2018–2021	(Indonesia) MBB
2021–2024	(Indonesia) XTen
2024–present	(Indonesia) DRX Wear

== Stadium ==
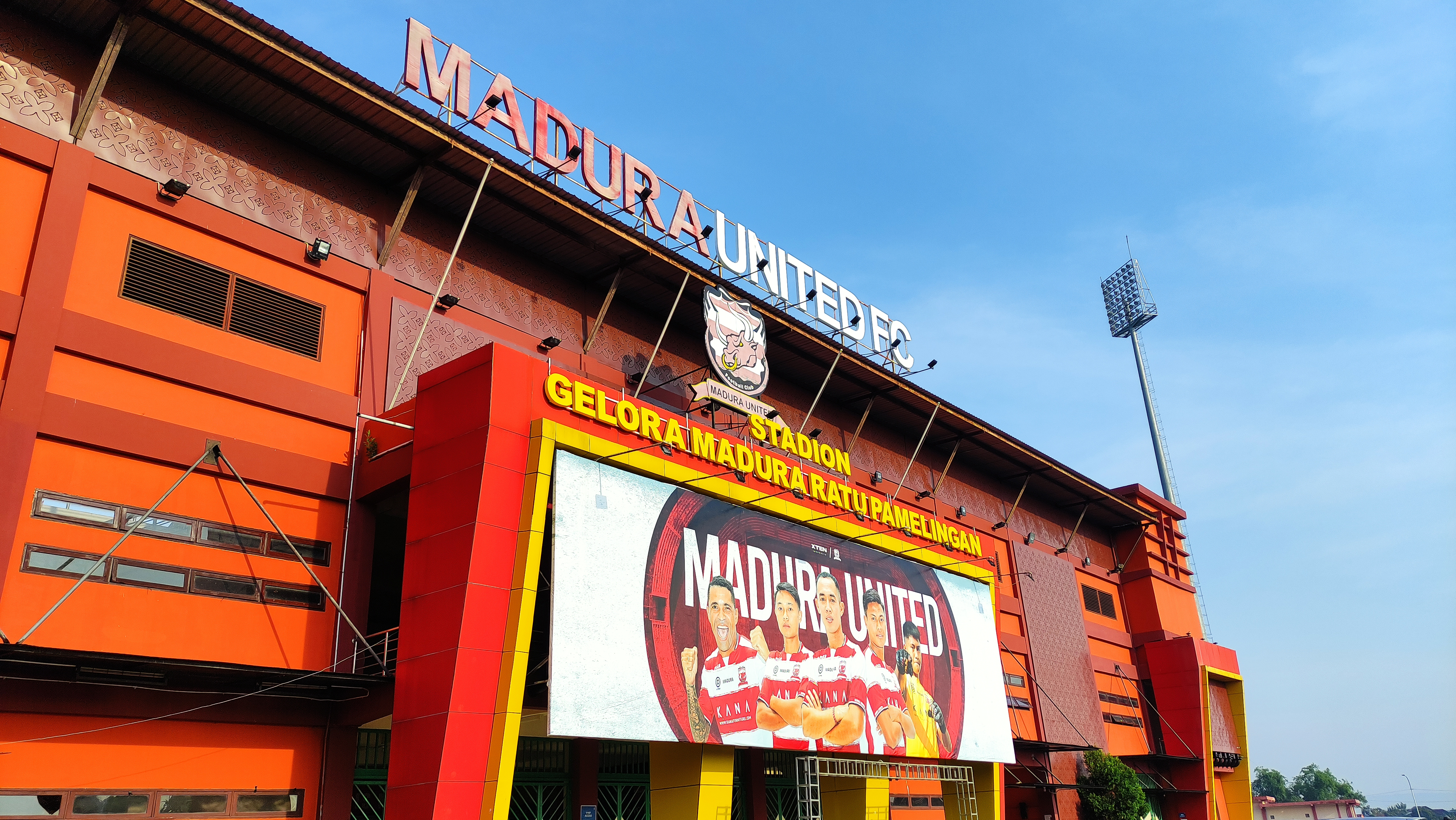
Gelora Ratu Pamelingan Stadium

Madura United play their home matches at Gelora Madura Ratu Pamelingan Stadium, located in Tlanakan. The stadium is owned by the Pamekasan Regency government and has a reported capacity of approximately 13,500 spectators. It was opened on 18 November 2016, the same year Madura United was established following the relocation and rebranding of Persipasi Bandung Raya. The venue became the club's principal home ground, providing a base for its participation in Indonesian domestic competitions. It is primarily used for football matches and features a natural-grass pitch and an athletics track.

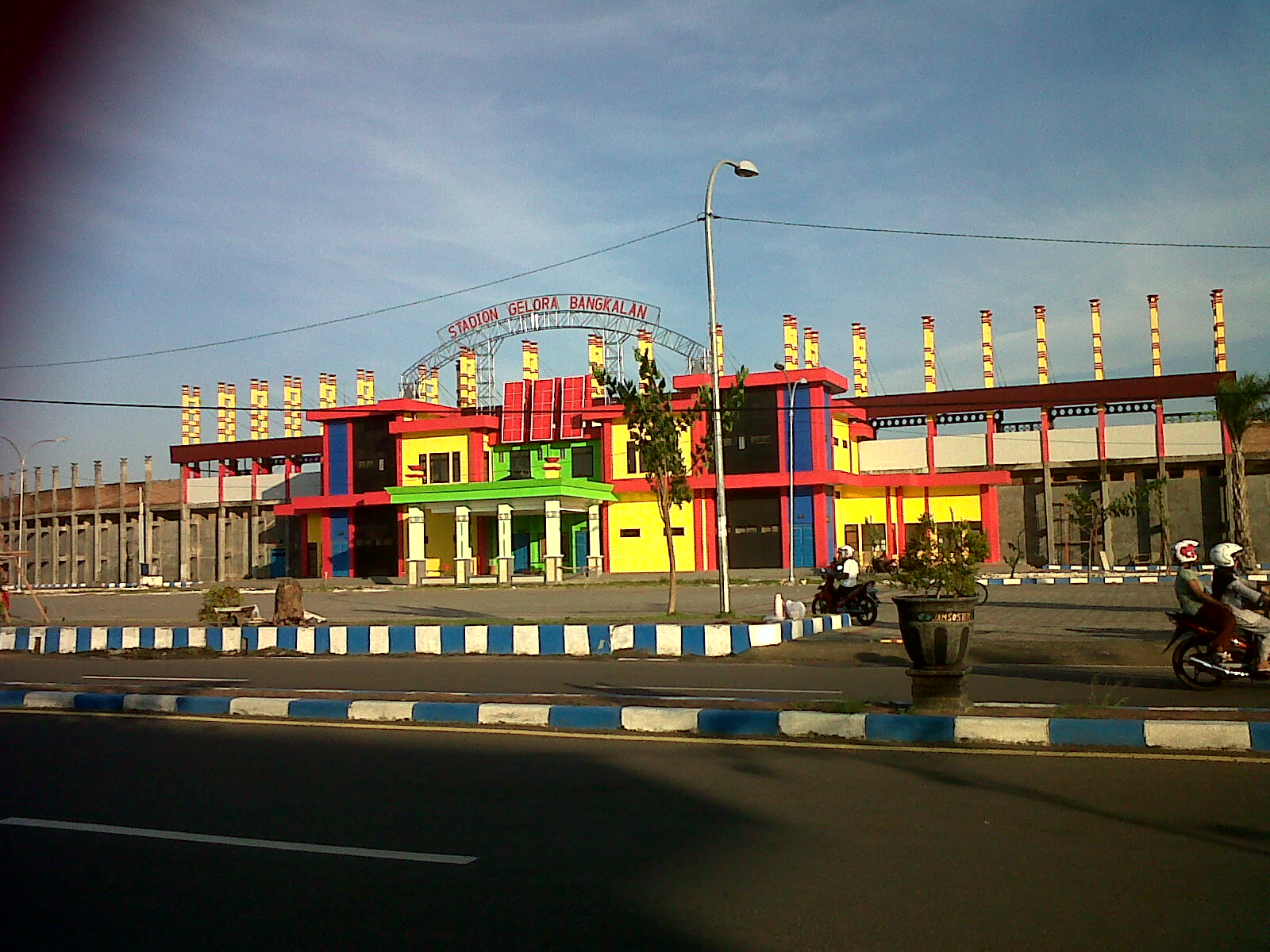
Gelora Bangkalan Stadium

During the 2023–24 Liga 1 season, Madura United also used Gelora Bangkalan Stadium in Bangkalan as a home venue alongside Gelora Madura Ratu Pamelingan. The decision allowed the club to use a second stadium on the island, with Gelora Bangkalan Stadium serving as an alternative venue for selected league fixtures. Madura United continued to use both grounds during its subsequent domestic campaigns, including the 2024–25 season, when several home matches were played in Bangkalan. In the 2025–26 season, the club returned to Gelora Madura Ratu Pamelingan as its principal home ground. However, in April 2026, Madura United announced a temporary move to Gelora Bangkalan for its remaining four home matches of that season, in an effort to improve its results. The two stadiums have therefore both played a role in the club's home-match arrangements since its establishment.

== Players ==
=== Current squad ===
As of September 2026

Note: Flags indicate national team as defined under FIFA eligibility rules; some limited exceptions apply. Players may hold more than one non-FIFA nationality.

No.	Pos.	Nation	Player
1	GK	IDN	Angga Saputro
3	DF	POR	Pedro Monteiro
4	MF	NED	Jordy Wehrmann (vice-captain)
8	MF	PAR	Danilo Santacruz
9	FW	BUL	Dimitar Mitkov
10	MF	BRA	Iran Júnior
11	MF	BRA	Lulinha (captain)
12	GK	IDN	Bima Koto
15	DF	IDN	Giovani Numberi
16	DF	IDN	Brandon Scheunemann
17	MF	IDN	Paulo Sitanggang
20	GK	IDN	Diky Indriyana
21	FW	TLS	Gali Freitas (on loan from Persebaya Surabaya)
23	MF	BRA	Jajá
24	MF	IDN	Taufany Muslihuddin
25	MF	IDN	Riski Afrisal

No.	Pos.	Nation	Player
26	GK	IDN	Aditya Harlan
28	DF	IDN	Vava Mario Yagalo
29	DF	IDN	Dede Sapari (on loan from PSIM Yogyakarta)
33	DF	IDN	Ardi Idrus
36	MF	IDN	Ilhamsyah
37	MF	NED	Jasey Wehrmann
42	MF	IDN	Feby Ramzy
43	GK	IDN	Aria Devangga
45	DF	IDN	Taufik Hidayat
47	MF	IDN	Fauzan Hanif
68	DF	IDN	Ahmad Rusadi
69	FW	IDN	Aldo Maulidino
77	FW	GBS	Balotelli
78	MF	IDN	Rifqi Farandi
95	DF	BRA	Mendonça
99	FW	IDN	Aji Kusuma

=== Out on loan ===
Note: Flags indicate national team as defined under FIFA eligibility rules; some limited exceptions apply. Players may hold more than one non-FIFA nationality.

No.	Pos.	Nation	Player
81	GK	IDN	Rendy Razzaqu (at Adhyaksa Bekasi)

== Management and staff ==
Position	Name
Technical director	Vacant
Head coach	(Indonesia) Rakhmad Basuki (caretaker)
Assistant coach	(Indonesia) Ananto Nurhani
Goalkeeper coach	(Indonesia) Amiruddin
Physical coach	(Indonesia) Roni Azani
Physiotherapist	(Indonesia) Dimas Bagus

== Honours ==
=== Domestic ===
==== As Pelita Jaya/Persipasi Bandung Raya/Madura United ====
Domestic League Top Tier Division

- Galatama/Liga 1
  - Champions (3): 1988–89, 1990, 1993–94
  - Runners-up (3): 1986–87, 1987–88, 2023-24

Domestic cups

- Piala Utama/ Piala Liga
  - Champions (1): 1992
  - Runners-up (4): 1987, 1988, 1989, 1990

=== Continental ===
==== As Pelita Jaya/ Madura United ====
- AFC Champions League (AFC Champions League Elite/AFC Champions League/Asian Club Championship/Asian Champion Club Tournament)
  - Third-place (1): 1990–91
- AFC Challenge League
  - Semi-finals (1): 2024–25

==== Pelita Jaya/Madura United U-21 team ====
All records under the Pelita name

League

- Indonesia Super League U-21
  - Champions (1): 2008–09
  - Runners-up (1): 2009–10
  - Third-place (1): 2012

== Notable players ==
=== International capped players ===
As of 2026–27 season.

AFC/OFC.: (Australia) Cameron Watson; (Australia) Dane Milovanović; (Australia) Jacob Pepper; (Iran) Milad Zeneyedpour; (Mali) Mamadou Samassa; (Philippines) Christian Rontini; (Singapore) Jacob Mahler; (Tajikistan) Nuriddin Davronov; (Timor-Leste) Gali Freitas; (Timor-Leste) Pedro Henrique	CAF.: (Ivory Coast) Boubacar Sanogo; (Liberia) Erick Weeks Lewis; (Liberia) Zah Rahan Krangar; (Nigeria) Peter Odemwingie	UEFA.: (Bulgaria) Dimitar Mitkov; (Bosnia and Herzegovina) Kerim Palić; (Netherlands) Jordy Wehrmann; (Ukraine) Valeriy Hryshyn	CONMEBOL/ CONCACAF.: (Argentina) Mario Kempes; (Brazil) Beto de Paula; (Brazil) Jajá; (Brazil) Lulinha; (Brazil) Thiago Furtuoso; (Colombia) Brayan Angulo; (Paraguay) Danilo Santacruz

== Managerial history ==
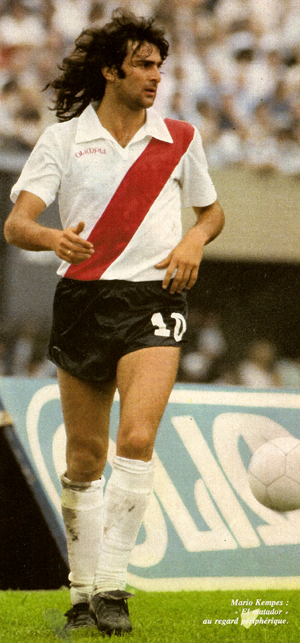
1978 FIFA World Cup winner, Mario Kempes initially joined as a player before retiring and becoming the club's manager in 1995.

Coach	Period
As Pelita Jaya
(Indonesia) Mundari Karya	1994–1995
(Argentina) Mario Kempes	1995–1996
(Federal Republic of Yugoslavia) Selimir Milošević	1996–1997
(Netherlands) Henk Wullems	1997
(Netherlands) Rob Jacobs	1997–1998
(Indonesia) Danurwindo	1998–2004
(Indonesia) Mundari Karya	2005
(Indonesia) Bambang Nurdiansyah	2006
(Indonesia) Syafrudin Fabanyo	2006
(Singapore) Fandi Ahmad	2007–2010
(Serbia) Misha Radovic	2010–2011
(Indonesia) Rahmad Darmawan	2011–2012
(Scotland) Simon McMenemy	2012–2013
(France) Darko Janacković	2013
(Serbia) Dejan Antonić	2013–2015
(Netherlands) Pieter Huistra	2015
As Madura United
(Brazil) Gomes de Oliveira	2016–2018
(Bosnia and Herzegovina) Milomir Šešlija	2018
(Brazil) Gomes de Oliveira (2)	2018
(Serbia) Dejan Antonić (2)	2019
(Indonesia) Rasiman	2019
(Indonesia) Rahmad Darmawan (2)	2020–2021
(Brazil) Fábio Lefundes	2021–2023
(Brazil) Maurício Souza	2023–2024
(Indonesia) Widodo Cahyono Putro	2024
(Portugal) Paulo Menezes	2024
(Argentina) Alfredo Vera	2025
(Brazil) Carlos Parreira	2025–2026
(Portugal) Zé Gomes	2026–present

== Season by season record ==
As Pelita/Persipasi Bandung Raya

Season	League tier	League	League position	Piala Indonesia	Asian competition(s)
1994–95	1	Premier Division	Second round	–	Qualifying stage
1995–96	1	Premier Division	Second round	–	–
1996–97	1	Premier Division	Second round	–	–
1997–98	1	Premier Division	Season abandoned	–	–
1998–99	1	Premier Division	Second round	–	–
1999–00	1	Premier Division	Second round	–	–
2001	1	Premier Division	11th, East Div.	–	–
2002	1	Premier Division	7th, West Div	–	–
2003	1	Premier Division	14th	–	–
2004	1	Premier Division	17th	–	–
2005	1	Premier Division	13th, East Div.	First round	–
2006	2	First Division	Second round, Gr. A	Second round	–
2007–08	1	Premier Division	8th, West Div.	4th	–
2008–09	1	Indonesia Super League	9th	Third round	–
2009–10	1	Indonesia Super League	15th	Quarter Final	–
2010–11	1	Indonesia Super League	12th	–	–
2011–12	1	Indonesia Super League	6th	Did not participated	–
2013	1	Indonesia Super League	15th	–	–
2014	1	Indonesia Super League	Semifinal	–	–
2015	1	Indonesia Super League	Season not finished	–	–

Key

- Tms. = Number of teams
- Pos. = Position in league

As Madura United

Season	League tier	League	League position	Piala Indonesia	I-League Cup	ACLE	ACL 2	ACGL	ACC
2016 (Note: Not an official competition affiliated with PSSI, AFC & FIFA)	1	Indonesia Soccer Championship A	3rd	–	–	–	–	–	–
2017	1	Liga 1	6th	–	–	–	–	–	–
2018	1	Liga 1	8th	Semifinal	–	–	–	–	–
2019	1	Liga 1	5th	Semifinal	–	–	–	–	–
2020	1	Liga 1	Season declared void	–	–	–	–	–	–
2021–22	1	Liga 1	9th	–	–	–	–	–	–
2022–23	1	Liga 1	8th	–	–	–	–	–	–
2023–24	1	Liga 1	2nd	–	–	–	–	–	–
2024–25	1	Liga 1	15th	–	–	–	–	Semi-final	–
2025–26	1	Super League	14th	–	–	–	–	–	–
2026–27	1	Super League	TBD	–	TBD	–	–	–	–

Key

- Tms. = Number of teams
- Pos. = Position in league

== Performance in AFC club competitions ==
As Pelita Jaya

Season	Competition	Round	Nat	Club	Home	Away	Aggregate
1989–90	Asian Club Championship	Qualifying tournament group 5	(Brunei)	Muara Stars FC	2–1		2nd
1989–90	Asian Club Championship	Qualifying tournament group 5	(Malaysia)	Kuala Lumpur FA	1–2		2nd
1989–90	Asian Club Championship	Qualifying tournament group 5	(Singapore)	Geylang International	4–1		2nd
1989–90	Asian Club Championship	Qualifying tournament group 5	(Philippines)	Philippine Air Force	3–0		2nd
1989–90	Asian Club Championship	Group B	(China)	Liaoning	0–1		4th
1989–90	Asian Club Championship	Group B	(Iraq)	Al Rasheed	1–1		4th
1989–90	Asian Club Championship	Group B	(Iran)	Shahin Ahvaz	0–2		4th
1990–91	Asian Club Championship	Qualifying tournament group 6	(Thailand)	Bangkok Bank FC	2–1		1st
1990–91	Asian Club Championship	Qualifying tournament group 6	(Singapore)	Geylang International	0–0		1st
1990–91	Asian Club Championship	Group A	(Oman)	Al-Nasr	3–0		2nd
1990–91	Asian Club Championship	Group A	(China)	Liaoning FC	0–1		2nd
1990–91	Asian Club Championship	Semi-finals	(Iran)	Esteghlal	0–2		
1990–91	Asian Club Championship	Third place playoff	(North Korea)	25 April	2–2 (7–6 p)		
1991	Asian Club Championship	Qualifying stage 1st round	(Singapore)	Geylang International	1–2	2–2	3–4
1994–95	Asian Club Championship	Qualifying stage 2nd round	(South Korea)	Ilhwa Chunma	0–1	1–4	1–5

As Madura United

Season	Competition	Round	Nat	Club	Home	Away	Aggregate
2024–25	AFC Challenge League	Group E	(Mongolia)	SP Falcons	0–0		1st
2024–25	AFC Challenge League	Group E	(Cambodia)	Preah Khan Reach Svay Rieng	2–1		1st
2024–25	AFC Challenge League	Quarter-finals	(Chinese Taipei)	Tainan City	3–0	0–0	3–0
2024–25	AFC Challenge League	Semi-finals	(Cambodia)	Preah Khan Reach Svay Rieng	3–3	0–3	3–6

== Invitational tournament record ==
As Pelita Jaya

Season	Competition	Round	Nat	Club	Home	Away	Aggregate
2009	Singapore Cup	Preliminary Round	(Brunei)	DPMM FC	0–1		
