= 1991 Asian Club Championship =

11th edition of premier club football tournament organized by the AFC

Tournament details
- Dates: August – December 1991
- Teams: 20
- Venue: Doha (final stage)

Final positions
- Champions: (Saudi Arabia) Al-Hilal (1st title)
- Runners-up: (Iran) Esteghlal
- Third place: (Qatar) Al Rayyan
- Fourth place: (United Arab Emirates) Al Shabab

Tournament statistics
- Matches played: 35
- Goals scored: 104 (2.97 per match)

The 1991 Asian Club Championship was the 11th edition of the annual Asian club football competition hosted by Asian Football Confederation.

Al-Hilal from Saudi Arabia won the final and became the first Asian Championship winner from Saudi Arabia.

== Qualifying Stage ==
=== First round ===
==== Summary ====
Team 1	Agg.	Team 2	1st leg	2nd leg
Al-Oruba (Oman)	2–5	(Qatar) Al-Rayyan	2–4	0–1
Al-Jahra (Kuwait)	0–4	(Saudi Arabia) Al-Hilal	0–2	0–2
Al-Ansar (Lebanon)	2–4	(United Arab Emirates) Al-Shabab	1–3	1–1
West Riffa (Bahrain)	1–1 (4–5 p)	(Yemen) Al-Tilal	0–1	1–0 (a.e.t.)
Mohammedan SC (Bangladesh)	5–0	(Pakistan) WAPDA FC	5–0	0–0
April 25 (North Korea)	3–2	(China) Liaoning FC	0–1	3–1
Sporting de Macau	1–14	(Hong Kong) South China	1–9	0–5
Geylang International (Singapore)	3–4	(Indonesia) Pelita Jaya	1–2	2–2

==== Matches ====
Al Rayyan (Qatar)	4–2	(Oman) Al-Oruba

Al-Oruba (Oman)	0–1	(Qatar) Al Rayyan

Al-Rayyan won 5–2 on aggregate.

18 October 1991

Al-Hilal (Saudi Arabia)	2–0	(Kuwait) Al Jahra
	Report

20 October 1991

Al Jahra (Kuwait)	0–2	(Saudi Arabia) Al-Hilal
	Report

Al-Hilal won 4–0 on aggregate.

Al Shabab (United Arab Emirates)	3–1	(Lebanon) Al-Ansar

Al-Ansar (Lebanon)	1–1	(United Arab Emirates) Al Shabab

Al-Shabab won 4–2 on aggregate.

Al-Tilal (Yemen)	1–0	(Bahrain) West Riffa

West Riffa (Bahrain)	1–0	(Yemen) Al-Tilal
Penalties
	4–5

1-1 on aggregate. Al-Tilal won 5–4 on penalties.

26 October 1991

Mohammedan SC (Bangladesh)	5–0	(Pakistan) WAPDA
Nakib 11', 21'; Sabbir 55'; Mizan 83'; Riyaz Uddin 86'

Dhaka Stadium, Bangladesh
Referee: Vichai Charupunt (Thailand)
1 November 1991

WAPDA (Pakistan)	0–0	(Bangladesh) Mohammedan SC

Railway Stadium, Pakistan

Mohammedan SC won 5–0 on aggregate.

Liaoning FC (China)	1–0	(North Korea) April 25

April 25 (North Korea)	3–1	(China) Liaoning FC

April 25 won 3–2 on aggregate.

South China (Hong Kong)	9–1	Sporting de Macau

Sporting de Macau	0–5	(Hong Kong) South China

South China won 14–1 on aggregate.

Pelita Jaya (Indonesia)	1–2	(Singapore) Geylang International

Geylang International (Singapore)	2–2	(Indonesia) Pelita Jaya

Geylang International won 4–3 on aggregate.

Note: Pelita Jaya were subsequently suspended by the AFC due to crowd disturbances during the second leg, followed by a pitch invasion following the final whistle.

=== Second round ===
==== Summary ====
Team 1	Agg.	Team 2	1st leg	2nd leg
Al-Rayyan (Qatar)	Bye	n/a	n/a	n/a
Al-Hilal (Saudi Arabia)	Bye	n/a	n/a	n/a
Al-Shabab (United Arab Emirates)	Bye	n/a	n/a	n/a
Port Authority (Thailand)	Bye	n/a	n/a	n/a
Al-Tilal (Yemen)	0–5	(Iran) Esteghlal	0–0	0–5
Mohammedan SC (Bangladesh)	5–0	(Maldives) New Radiant	3–0	2–0
South China (Hong Kong)	2–3	(Japan) Yomiuri FC	1–0	1–3
April 25 (North Korea)	awd.	(Singapore) Geylang International^{1}	n/a	n/a

^{1} Geylang International withdrew after the draw.

==== Matches ====
Al-Tilal (Yemen)	0–0	(Iran) Esteghlal

Esteghlal (Iran)	5–0	(Yemen) Al-Tilal

Esteghlal won 5–0 on aggregate.

11 November 1991

Mohammedan SC (Bangladesh)	3–0	(Maldives) New Radiant
Sabbir 23'; Riyaz Uddin 53'; Ayaz Ahmed 84'

Mirpur Stadium, Bangladesh
Referee: Ahsanul Haque (Bangladesh)
19 November 1991

New Radiant (Maldives)	0–2	(Bangladesh) Mohammedan SC
		Titu; Nakib

Galolhu Rasmee Dhandu Stadium, Maldives

Mohammedan SC won 5–0 on aggregate.

South China AA (Hong Kong)	1–0	(Japan) Yomiuri FC

Yomiuri FC (Japan)	3–1	(Hong Kong) South China

Yomiuri FC won 3–2 on aggregate.

== Quarter finals ==
- (Japan) Yomiuri FC withdrew.

=== Group A ===
Pos	Team	Pld	W	D	L	GF	GA	GD	Pts	Qualification	(Qatar) RYY	(United Arab Emirates) SHB	(Thailand) PAT	(Bangladesh) MOH
1	(Qatar) Al Rayyan	3	3	0	0	8	3	+5	6	Advance to Semi-finals	—	2–1	3–1	2–1
2	(United Arab Emirates) Al Shabab	3	2	0	1	6	4	+2	4	Advance to Semi-finals	—	—	3–1	2–1
3	(Thailand) Port Authority	3	1	0	2	6	7	−1	2		—	—	—	4–1
4	(Bangladesh) Mohammedan SC	3	0	0	3	3	9	−6	0		—	—	—	—

Source: RSSSF
12 December 1991

Al Rayyan (Qatar)	3–1	(Thailand) Port Authority

12 December 1991

Al Shabab (United Arab Emirates)	2–1	(Bangladesh) Mohammedan SC
		Nakib

14 December 1991

Port Authority (Thailand)	4–1	(Bangladesh) Mohammedan SC
		Nakib

14 December 1991

Al Rayyan (Qatar)	2–1	(United Arab Emirates) Al Shabab

16 December 1991

Al Rayyan (Qatar)	3–1	(Bangladesh) Mohammedan SC
		Nakib

16 December 1991

Al Shabab (United Arab Emirates)	3–1	(Thailand) Port Authority

=== Group B ===
Pos	Team	Pld	W	D	L	GF	GA	GD	Pts	Qualification	(Saudi Arabia) HIL	(Iran) EST	(North Korea) A25
1	(Saudi Arabia) Al-Hilal	2	2	0	0	3	0	+3	4	Advance to Semi-finals	—	2–0	1–0
2	(Iran) Esteghlal	2	0	1	1	1	2	−1	1	Advance to Semi-finals	—	—	1–1
3	(North Korea) April 25	2	0	1	1	1	3	−2	1		—	—	—

Source: RSSSF
13 December 1991

Al-Hilal (Saudi Arabia)	2–0	(North Korea) April 25

15 December 1991

Al-Hilal (Saudi Arabia)	1–0	(Iran) Esteghlal

17 December 1991

Esteghlal (Iran)	1–1	(North Korea) April 25

== Knockout Stage ==
=== Bracket ===
Semi-finals
20 December – Doha
(Qatar) Al-Rayyan	1
(Iran) Esteghlal	2
20 December – Doha
(Saudi Arabia) Al Hilal	1
(United Arab Emirates) Al-Shabab	0

Final
29 July – Doha
(Iran) Esteghlal	1 (2)
(Saudi Arabia) Al-Hilal (p)	1 (3)
Third place play-off
28 July – Doha
(Qatar) Al-Rayyan (p)	2 (7)
(United Arab Emirates) Al-Shabab	2 (6)

=== Semi-finals ===
20 December 1991

Al-Hilal (Saudi Arabia)	1–0	(United Arab Emirates) Al Shabab
Jazea 55'

Doha, Qatar
Referee: Talal Saleh (Lebanon)

20 December 1991

Al Rayyan (Qatar)	1–2	(Iran) Esteghlal
Faisal Al Addam 28'		Abdolali Changiz 86'; Abbas Sarkhab 90'

Doha, Qatar

=== Third Place ===
22 December 1991

Al Rayyan (Qatar)	2–2	(United Arab Emirates) Al Shabab
Penalties
	7–6

Doha, Qatar

=== Final ===
22 December 1991

Esteghlal (Iran)	1–1 (a.e.t.)	(Saudi Arabia) Al-Hilal
Hashemi-Moghaddam 58'		Al-Habashi 73'
Penalties
Reza Hasan Zadeh (penalty missed); Sadegh Varmazyar (penalty scored); Mehdi Fononoi Zadeh (penalty scored); Samad Marfavi (penalty missed); Abbas Sorkhab (penalty missed)	2-3	Hasan al Habashi (penalty missed); yussef al Thanyan (penalty scored); yussef Jaze (penalty scored); mansour al Ahmad (penalty scored)

Grand Hamad Stadium, Doha Qatar
