= Imtiaz Ahmed Nakib =

Bangladeshi footballer

Personal information
- Full name: Imtiaz Ahmed Nakib
- Date of birth: 1 September 1969 (age 57)
- Place of birth: Narsingdi, East Pakistan
- Height: 1.77 m (5 ft 9 1/2 in)
- Position: Center forward

Youth career
- 1985–1986: Badda Jagoroni

Senior career*
| Years | Team | Apps | (Gls) |
| 1986–1989 | Badda Jagoroni | | |
| 1989–1994 | Mohammedan SC | | (22) |
| 1994–2000 | Muktijoddha Sangsad | | (57) |
| 1999–2000 | Mohammedan SC | | (6) |
| 2000–2001 | Mohun Bagan | | |
| 2001–2007 | Mohammedan SC | | (22) |

International career
| 1988–1990 | Bangladesh U16 | ? | (?) |
| 1991 | Bangladesh U23 | 8 | (8) |
| 1990–1999 | Bangladesh | 21 | (6) |
| 1993 | Bangladesh B | 3 | (1) |
Medal record
Men's football
Representing Bangladesh
South Asian Games
| Bronze medal – third place | 1991 Colombo |
| Silver medal – second place | 1995 Madras |
SAFF Championship
| Runner-up | 1995 Colombo |
| Runner-up | 1995 Goa |
- * Club domestic league appearances and goals

Imtiaz Ahmed Nakib (Bengali: ইমতিয়াজ আহমেদ নকীব; born 1 September 1969) is a Bangladeshi former professional footballer who played as a striker for the Bangladesh national football team, throughout the 1990s. He has a total of 107 goals in Bangladeshi top-flight football and is the current all-time top scorer for Muktijoddha Sangsad KC, with 57 league goals.

== Personal life ==
Nakib was born on 1 September 1969, in Narsingdi. He was brought up in Dhaka, due to his father's job as a veterinarian.

On 3 July 2018, Nakib suffered a heart attack and was admitted to Ibrahim Cardiac Hospital in Shahbagh.

== Life after retirement ==
Nakib is the current team manager of Mohammedan SC.

== Club career ==
=== Early years ===
Nakib's journey with football began after his father switched jobs to the Badda district in 1980. He started playing in with neighborhood kids there, and in 1985, one of his friends invited him to meet the coach of local club Badda Jagoroni. Nakib started his club career with pioneer league team Badda Jagoroni Sangsad in 1986, while he was still at secondary school. Nakib had previously played as a goalkeeper for his school, however, after being convinced the clubs coach Sayeed Hassan Kanan, who was also the national team goalkeeper at the time, Nakib registered at the club as a striker, even though he never played the role before. He played in pioneer division from 1986 to 1997 and then in the Third Division league in 1988, although he failed to secure a permanent place in the starting lineup during that time. Nakib was also a regular member of the Dhaka University football team. In the late 1990s Nakib's family wanted him to quit playing as he was not able to find a sustainable source of income by playing in a semi-professional league, however, in 1989, he got an offer from Mohammedan SC, who were the biggest club in Bangladesh at the time. The surprise move took place because Nakib managed to survive a trial for Bangladesh U16 in 1988 and after the trial the Bangladesh Football Federation, placed a new rule on First Division clubs, where a team has to sign 2 new players at the start of each season, and so, Nakib ended up at Mohammedan to fill the new player quota.

=== Dhaka league and Asia ===
Nakib scored 7 goals in the league during his first season. He also helped Mohammedan reach the quarter-finals of the 1990–91 Asian Club Championship, his goals came against Salgaocar FC from India and also against Club Lagoons from Maldives. Nakib's record of scoring in Asian competitions continued, as he scored against five different during the 1991 Asian Club Championship. In 1994 all the big named players in the country joined Muktijoddha Sangsad KC and Nakib was also forced to leave by the club officials, who did not know at the time that their decision will come to haunt them. Nakib was top scorer for 4 straight seasons becoming only the second player after Sheikh Mohammad Aslam to achieve the feat, which only further increased the comparisons between the two. He scored 12 goals in 1995 and 13 in 1996. In 1997 Muktijoddha played Mohammedan in the final matchday of the season. Mohammedan needed only a point to win the league, however, Muktijoddha's captain Nakib scored a brace and in thereby won the team their first ever league title, leaving the Mohammedan club officials and fans in dismay. From 1994 to 1999, Nakib scored a total of 57 league goals for the club, making him the clubs all-time leading goal scorer, before rejoining Mohammedan in 1999. During his time at Muktijoddha and during his second spell at Mohammedan Nakib was reported to be paid a monthly salary of 7 lakh Bangladeshi taka.

One of his most influential games came in 2000, for Mohammedan against their arch-rivals Abahani Limited Dhaka, a game were Mohammedan were trailing by 2 goals, however, Nakib scored a hattrick, making him only the second ever player to score thrice during the Dhaka Derby. The game ended 4–3, with Motiur Munna, scoring in the dying moments of the match. This game helped Nakib regain the love of the Mohammedan supporters, after he became the clubs villain while playing for Muktijoddha. Nakib also spent a year with Indian giants Mohun Bagan in the National Football League from 2000 to 2001, during the decline of the domestic league and Bangladeshi football in general. Nakib again returned to Mohammedan in 2001, and scored 5 goals that year for the runner-up team in the league. On 23 March 2007, Nakib retired after playing his last Dhaka Derby for Mohammedan. The veteran scored 107 goals in domestic league football in his 18-year long career and scored another 45 to 50 goals in different tournaments, he also found the net against numerous Asian opponents during AFC Club competitions. His most well known strikes in continental competitions came against Thai club Port FC, Qatari club Al-Rayyan SC and Al Shabab from UAE, all of which came during the 1991 Asian Club Championship. He also has several goals against south Asian opposition during AFC tournaments.

== International career ==
=== Olympic team ===
Nakib scored 8 goals for the Under-23 team during the Olympic Football qualifiers in 1991. He scored 5 times against the Philippines U23, as Bangladesh defeated them 8–0. He also managed to score a brace against the Philippines in the return game. During the last qualifying game, Nakib scored an important headed goal from a Mamun Joarder cross to earn Bangladesh a win against the Malaysia U23 team.

=== Bangladesh national team ===
From 1990 to 1999 Nakib played for the Bangladesh national team. However, even though he was not dropped from selection and kept on scoring in the league during these 9 years, Nakib failed to solidify a starting spot in the national team. According to him it was due to the fact that the Mohammedan staff and coaches held a grudge against him for joining Muktijoddha. The club officials forced the national team coach to not play him. Nakib's greatest game for the National team came during Bangladesh's first ever title triumph, the 4-nation Tiger Trophy in Myanmar. During the final Bangladesh took on the hosts. Myanmar had already defeated the nation during the opening match of the tournament, however, this time a change of tactics brought in by coach Otto Pfister, helped Bangladesh surprise their opponents. Bangladesh took the lead through Mamun Joarder, but soon Myanmar equalized, eventually Nakib scored Bangladesh's winner through a 49th-minute header from a Rakib Hossain cross. Nakib also scored during the 1997 South Asian Football Federation Gold Cup against Maldives, which ended up being his last ever goal for his country. During the 1999 South Asian Football Federation Gold Cup, Bangladesh coach at the time, Samir Shaker told Nakib "You are not allowed to join the team", forcing him to retire from the national team.

== Style of play ==
Nakib was well known for scoring goals via headers. He was often compared with the country's legendary striker Sheikh Mohammad Aslam due to his ability to score headers and win aerial duels.

== Career statistics ==
=== Club ===
Scores and results list Mohammedan SC's goal tally first.

List of club international goals scored by Imtiaz Ahmed Nakib
| No. | Date | Venue | Opponent | Score | Result | Competition |
|---|---|---|---|---|---|---|
| 1. | 19 July 1990 | Bangabandhu National Stadium, Dhaka | (Maldives) Club Lagoons | | 5–0 | AFC Champions League |
| 2. | 19 July 1990 | Bangabandhu National Stadium, Dhaka | (Maldives) Club Lagoons | | 5–0 | AFC Champions League |
| 4. | 21 July 1990 | Bangabandhu National Stadium, Dhaka | (India) Salgaocar FC | | 2–1 | AFC Champions League |
| 5. | 2 June 1991 | Bangabandhu National Stadium, Dhaka | (India) East Bengal Club | 1–0 | 1–1 | BTC Club Cup |
| 6. | 7 June 1991 | Bangabandhu National Stadium, Dhaka | (India) Mohun Bagan | 1–0 | 1–0 | BTC Club Cup |
| 7. | 1991 | Bangabandhu National Stadium, Dhaka | (Pakistan) WAPDA F.C. | | 5–0 | AFC Champions League |
| 8. | 1991 | Bangabandhu National Stadium, Dhaka | (Pakistan) WAPDA F.C. | | 5–0 | AFC Champions League |
| 9. | 1991 | National Stadium, Malé | (Maldives) New Radiant S.C. | | 0–2 | AFC Champions League |
| 10. | 12 December 1991 | Doha | (United Arab Emirates) Al Shabab | | 1–2 | AFC Champions League |
| 11. | 14 December 1991 | Doha | (Thailand) Port F.C. | | 1–4 | AFC Champions League |
| 12. | 16 December 1991 | Doha | (Qatar) Al-Rayyan SC | | 1–3 | AFC Champions League |

=== International ===
Appearances and goals by national team and year
| National team | Year | Apps | Goals |
|---|---|---|---|
Bangladesh
| Bangladesh | 1990 | 1 | 0 |
| Bangladesh | 1991 | 2 | 0 |
| Bangladesh | 1993 | 3 | 1 |
| Bangladesh | 1994 | 2 | 2 |
| Bangladesh | 1995 | 6 | 1 |
| Bangladesh | 1997 | 7 | 2 |
| Bangladesh | Total | 21 | 6 |

Scores and results list Bangladesh's goal tally first.

List of olympic international goals scored by Imtiaz Ahmed Nakib
| No. | Date | Venue | Opponent | Score | Result | Competition |
|---|---|---|---|---|---|---|
| 1. | 24 May 1991 | Seoul Olympic Stadium, Seoul | Philippines U23 | | 8–0 | Olympic Football Qualification |
| 2. | 24 May 1991 | Seoul Olympic Stadium, Seoul | Philippines U23 | | 8–0 | Olympic Football Qualification |
| 3. | 24 May 1991 | Seoul Olympic Stadium, Seoul | Philippines U23 | | 8–0 | Olympic Football Qualification |
| 4. | 24 May 1991 | Seoul Olympic Stadium, Seoul | Philippines U23 | | 8–0 | Olympic Football Qualification |
| 5. | 24 May 1991 | Seoul Olympic Stadium, Seoul | Philippines U23 | | 8–0 | Olympic Football Qualification |
| 6. | 5 July 1991 | Merdeka Stadium, Kuala Lumpur | Philippines U23 | | 3–0 | Olympic Football Qualification |
| 7. | 5 July 1991 | Merdeka Stadium, Kuala Lumpur | Philippines U23 | | 3–0 | Olympic Football Qualification |
| 8. | 7 July 1991 | Merdeka Stadium, Kuala Lumpur | Malaysia U23 | 1–0 | 1–0 | Olympic Football Qualification |
| 9. | 12 January 1993 | Bangabandhu National Stadium, Dhaka | (Romania) FC Petrolul Ploiești | 1–3 | 2–4 | Unofficial Friendly |

List of international goals scored by Imtiaz Ahmed Nakib
| No. | Date | Venue | Opponent | Score | Result | Competition |
|---|---|---|---|---|---|---|
| 1. | 10 December 1993 | Mirpur Stadium, Dhaka | Myanmar | | 3–1 | FIFA Friendly |
| 2. | 14 September 1994 | Khalifa International Stadium, Doha | India | 1–4 | 2–4 | Qatar Independence Cup |
| 3. | 14 September 1994 | Khalifa International Stadium, Doha | India | 2–4 | 2–4 | Qatar Independence Cup |
| 4. | 4 November 1995 | Thuwunna Stadium, Yangon | Myanmar | 2–1 | 2–1 | 1995 Burma Cup |
| 5. | 29 March 1997 | Prince Abdullah Al Faisal Stadium, Jeddah | Chinese Taipei | 2–1 | 2–1 | 1998 FIFA World Cup qualifiers |
| 6. | 5 September 1997 | Dasharath Rangasala Stadium, Kathmandu | Maldives | 1–1 | 1–1 | 1997 SAFF Championship |

== Honours ==
=== International ===
Bangladesh

- Four-nation International Invitational Football Tournament

1995

== Bibliography ==
- Alam, Masud (2017). ফুটবলের গল্প ফুটবলারদের গল্প (transl. The story of football the story of footballers) (in Bengali). Bishhoshahitto Bhobon. ISBN 9789849134688.
- Tariq, T Islam (2025). মোহামেডান-আবাহনী ময়দানি লড়াই (transl. Mohammedan-Abahani battle field) (in Bengali). Annesha Prokashon. ISBN 978-984-99475-1-6.
