= Chong King Kong =

Malaysian footballer

Personal information
- Date of birth: 22 April 1971 (age 55)
- Height: 1.78 m (5 ft 10 in)
- Positions: Defender; forward

Senior career*
Years	Team	Apps	(Gls)
- Penang

International career
1988	Malaysia U19	3	(0)
1990	Malaysia U21	1	(1)
1990–1991	Malaysia U23	10	(3)
1994	Malaysia B	3	(1)
1994	Malaysia	2	(0)
- * Club domestic league appearances and goals

Chong King Kong (born 22 April 1971) is a former Malaysian footballer.

== Club career ==
King Kong played for Penang.

== International career ==
=== Youth ===
King Kong represented Malaysia at under-19 level in qualification games for the 1988 AFC Youth Championship, before scoring in an under-21 fixture against Hong Kong in 1990. He represented the Malaysia national under-23 football team at the 1990 Indonesian Independence Cup, the 1991 Merdeka Tournament and qualification games for the 1992 Summer Olympics, scoring three times against The Philippines in two separate games.

He also represented the Malaysia 'B' team at the 1994 Dunhill Cup, scoring once against the Denmark under-21 side.

=== Senior ===
King Kong made two appearances for Malaysia in 1994, both in the 1994 Asian Games. He was sent home disgraced from the tournament due to his part in the 1994 Malaysian football scandal.

== Career statistics ==
=== International ===
Appearances and goals by national team and year
National team	Year	Apps	Goals
Malaysia	1994	2	0
Total		2	0
