= Franky Barreto =

Indian footballer

Personal information
- Full name: Franky Barreto
- Place of birth: Goa, India
- Position: Defender

Senior career*
Years	Team	Apps	(Gls)
- Churchill Brothers
- East Bengal
- Salgaocar SC

International career
- India
- * Club domestic league appearances and goals

Franky Barreto is a former Indian international football player who played as a defender. After starting off with Vasco SC in 1992, Barreto went on to play for a handful of top outfits in India, including Churchill Brothers, East Bengal and Salgaocar SC. He has capped for India national team 17 times and has also captained the national side. He has played in tournaments including the Nehru Cup in 1997 and the 1998 Bangkok Asian Games.

== Honours ==
India

- SAFF Championship: 1997

Salgaocar

- Federation Cup: 1997
