= Rezaul Karim Rehan =

Bangladeshi footballer

Personal information
- Full name: Mohammed Rezaul Karim Rehan
- Date of birth: 6 September 1968 (age 58)
- Place of birth: Sylhet, East Pakistan (present-day Bangladesh)
- Height: 1.86 m (6 ft 1 in)
- Positions: Centre-back; right-back

Youth career
- AMCA Academy

Senior career*
Years	Team	Apps	(Gls)
1985–1987	Muktijoddha Sangsad		
1988–1989	Dhaka Mohammedan		
1989–1993	Dhaka Abahani		
1991	Kolkata Mohammedan		
1994–1995	Dhaka Mohammedan		

International career
1988	Bangladesh U19	2	(0)
1989–1993	Bangladesh	20	(0)
Medal record
Representing Bangladesh
South Asian Games
Silver medal – second place	1989
Bronze medal – third place	1991
- * Club domestic league appearances and goals

Rezaul Karim Rehan (Bengali: রেজাউল করিম রেহান; born 6 September 1968) is a retired Bangladeshi footballer who played as a defender for the Bangladesh national team from 1989 to 1993.

== Club career ==
Rehan was trained in the AMCA Academy in Golapganj Upazila of Sylhet. He eventually played in the Sylhet First Division Football League with Agragami Club. He impressed coach Shamsuzzoha Chad during an under-19 camp held in Sylhet. Following his performances with Faridpur District in the National Football Championship, coach Chad helped him secure a place in the Dhaka First Division Football League club Muktijoddha Sangsad KC.

Rehan represented Mohammedan SC in the 1988–89 Asian Club Championship, during which he played an integral role as the Black and Whites became the first Bangladeshi club to reach the tournament's semi-final league round. He also won his first league title during the 1988–89 season. In 1989, Rehan joined Dhaka Abahani, winning two league titles in 1989 and 1992, respectively. He also won the BTC Club Cup, as Abahani defeated East Bengal 1–0 in the final.

== International career ==
Rehan captained Bangladesh U19 at the 1988 AFC Youth Championship qualifiers against North Korea U19 over two matches. He was also included in the Bangladesh national team squad for the 1987 South Asian Games. In the same year, he played unofficial matches for the national team during the Quaid-e-Azam International Tournament held in Pakistan. He made his official senior international debut during a 0–1 defeat to Thailand in the 1990 FIFA World Cup qualifiers on 19 February 1989. During the qualifiers, he was sent off during a 0–2 defeat to China. He also represented Bangladesh in the 1989 South Asian Games, later on that year.

During the 1989 South Asian Games, when Bangladesh took on India in the second group-stage match, they managed to take the lead through Nurul Haque Manik, however after a challenge from Rehan in the penalty box, Bangladesh conceded a late penalty which led to captain Elias Hossain pushing the referee in anger, earning him a ban from international football. Rehan later went on to represent Bangladesh in the 1990 Asian Games and the 1991 South Asian Games.

In 1993, during the 1994 FIFA World Cup qualifiers return game against Japan, Rehan was sent off for the second time in his international career as Bangladesh suffered a 4–1 defeat. Rehan's international career soon ended the same year.

== Career statistics ==
=== International ===
Appearances and goals by national team and year
National team	Year	Apps	Goals
Bangladesh
Bangladesh	1989	8	0
Bangladesh	1990	2	0
Bangladesh	1991	2	0
Bangladesh	1992	1	0
Bangladesh	1993	7	0
Bangladesh	Total	20	0

== Honours ==
Mohammedan SC

- Dhaka First Division League: 1988–89
- Federation Cup: 1995
- DMFA Cup: 1995

Abahani Limited Dhaka

- Dhaka First Division League: 1989–90, 1992
- BTC Club Cup: 1991

Bangladesh

- South Asian Games Silver medal: 1989; Bronze medal: 1991
