= Bangladesh national under-23 football team =

National association football team

Bangladesh Under-23
- Nickname: Bengal Tigers
- Association: Bangladesh Football Federation
- Confederation: AFC (Asia)
- Sub-confederation: SAFF (South Asia)
- Head coach: Maruful Haque
- Captain: Shekh Morsalin
- Top scorer: Imtiaz Ahmed Nakib (8)
- Home stadium: National Stadium, Dhaka
| First colours | Second colours |

First international
- Bangladesh 2–3 Thailand (Kuala Lumpur, Malaysia; 18 May 1991)

Biggest win
- Bangladesh 8–0 Philippines (Kuala Lumpur, Malaysia; 5 July 1991)

Biggest defeat
- Bangladesh 0–7 Jordan (Hebron, Palestine; 19 July 2017)

Asian Games
- Appearances: 5 (first in 2002)
- Best result: Round of 16 (2018)

South Asian Games
- Appearances: 5 (first in 2004)
- Best result: (gold) Gold medalist (2010)
Medal record
Men's Football
South Asian Games
| Gold medal – first place | 2010 Dhaka | Team |
| Bronze medal – third place | 2016 Guwahati | Team |
| Bronze medal – third place | 2019 Kathmandu | Team |

The Bangladesh U-23 national football team (Bengali: বাংলাদেশ অনূর্ধ্ব-২৩ জাতীয় ফুটবল দল), also known as the Bangladesh Olympic football team, is a youth football team operated under the Bangladesh Football Federation (BFF). The team represents Bangladesh in international youth football competitions in the Summer Olympics, South Asian Games and the Asian Games, as well as any other under-23 and under-22 international football tournaments, such as the AFC U-23 Asian Cup.

== History ==
=== 1990s ===
In 1991, the Bangladesh Football Federation formed its first olympic national team in preparation for the 1992 Summer Olympics qualifiers, which was jointly held in Seoul and Kuala Lumpur. The team coached by Abdul Hakim consisted of: Lahol, Bijon, Mohamed Mohsin Jr., Arif Moon, Aman, Masoud Rana, Barun Bikash Dewan (vice-captain), Jewel Rana, Sohel, Jamrul, Rumman Sabbir (captain), Mahabub Roksy, Alamgir Hasan, Sadekul Islam Uttam, Shafiqul Quader Munna, Zakir Hossain, Golam Gauss, Ekramur Rana, Mamun Joarder and Imtiaz Nakib. Bangladesh were placed in Group D with South Korea, Thailand, Malaysia and Philippines. In the first game held in Seoul, South Korea, on 18 May 1991, Bangladesh went down 2–3 to Thailand. Masoud Rana scored the olympic team's first ever goal with captain Sabbir scoring a consolation late into the game. On 24 May 1991, the team registered their first victory by thrashing the Philippines 8–0 as, Imtiaz Ahmed Nakib scored a national record of five goals in one match. In the second phase of the qualifiers held in Malaysia, Bangladesh earned victories over both hosts Malaysia and returning Philippines. The team finished second bottom in the group with three wins and five losses from eight games.

=== 2000s ===
The team returned to action during the 2002 Asian Games in South Korea. Under Austrian coach György Kottán they failed to win a single game while conceding nine goals and scoring only once in the process. The 2004 South Asian Games saw Bangladesh produce another disappointing campaign as they failed to advance past the group-stages after suffering a surprise 0–1 defeat to Pakistan. Nonetheless, during the tournament they earned their first victory in more than a decade by defeating Afghanistan 2–1, on 30 March 2004. The team followed up their dismal performances with multiple unsatisfactory campaigns, failing to win a single match during both the 2006 South Asian Games and 2006 Asian Games. On 14 February, Zahid Hasan Ameli lone strike against hosts Hong Kong earned the team only their second victory of the decade, however, Bangladesh crashed out of the 2008 Summer Olympics qualifiers preliminary round 1, suffering a 1–3 aggregate defeat.

=== 2010–present ===
==== 2010 South Asian Games ====

2010 South Asian Games Final starting line-up .

The 2010 South Asian Games took place in Dhaka, Bangladesh. The Bangladesh Football Federation appointed Serbian coach Zoran Đorđević only three weeks before the tournament. The hosts opened the tournament with a 3–0 victory over Nepal, on 30 January 2010. In the following game, held two days later, the team confirmed their semi-finals berth by thrashing Bhutan 4–0. They finished group winners as Zahid Hossain scored the only goal in a 1–0 victory over Maldives in the final group game. In the semi-final against tournament favourites, India, who fielded an U-20 team, Tawhidul Alam scored the lone goal in front of 20,000 fans present in the Bangabandhu National Stadium and sent the hosts to the final. In the gold medal match against Afghanistan, the team outplayed their opponents 4–0 and set a new tournament record of not conceding a single goal for five consecutive games. This was also the country's first South Asian Games football triumph since the tournament's re-introduction as an under-23 competition in 2002. Nonetheless, coach Zoran decided against extending his contract and departed only six days after the tournament concluded. Eventually, the team which was branded as the Golden generation were unable replicate the same form during the 2010 Asian Games and also as senior internationals.

==== 2014 Asian Games ====
Bangladesh began preparation for the 2014 Asian Games in August 2014 under Dutch coach Lodewijk de Kruif. On 3 August 2014, the Bangladesh Football Federation president, Kazi Salahuddin, held a press conference to motivate the selected players for the national team's camp. The president stated "Our football is going through a difficult period. The way football is running at the moment, it will be hard to sustain things for long. The FIFA fund that we get is not enough to even meet the coaches' salaries which is why we need financial support from sponsors and the government". The president further requested the players to return with satisfactory results in order to attract future sponsorship deals. The team played a preparatory match against Vietnam after reaching Incheon, South Korea. They suffered a 2–4 defeat. On 15 September 2014, Bangladesh began the tournament with a 1–0 victory over Afghanistan, which was the country's first victory in the Asian Games after 28 years. However, their chances of advancing past the group stages took a huge blow after suffering a 0–3 defeat to Uzbekistan in the following game. The team crashed out of the tournament after losing the final group-stage game against Hong Kong, despite dominating possession.

==== 2016 South Asian Games ====
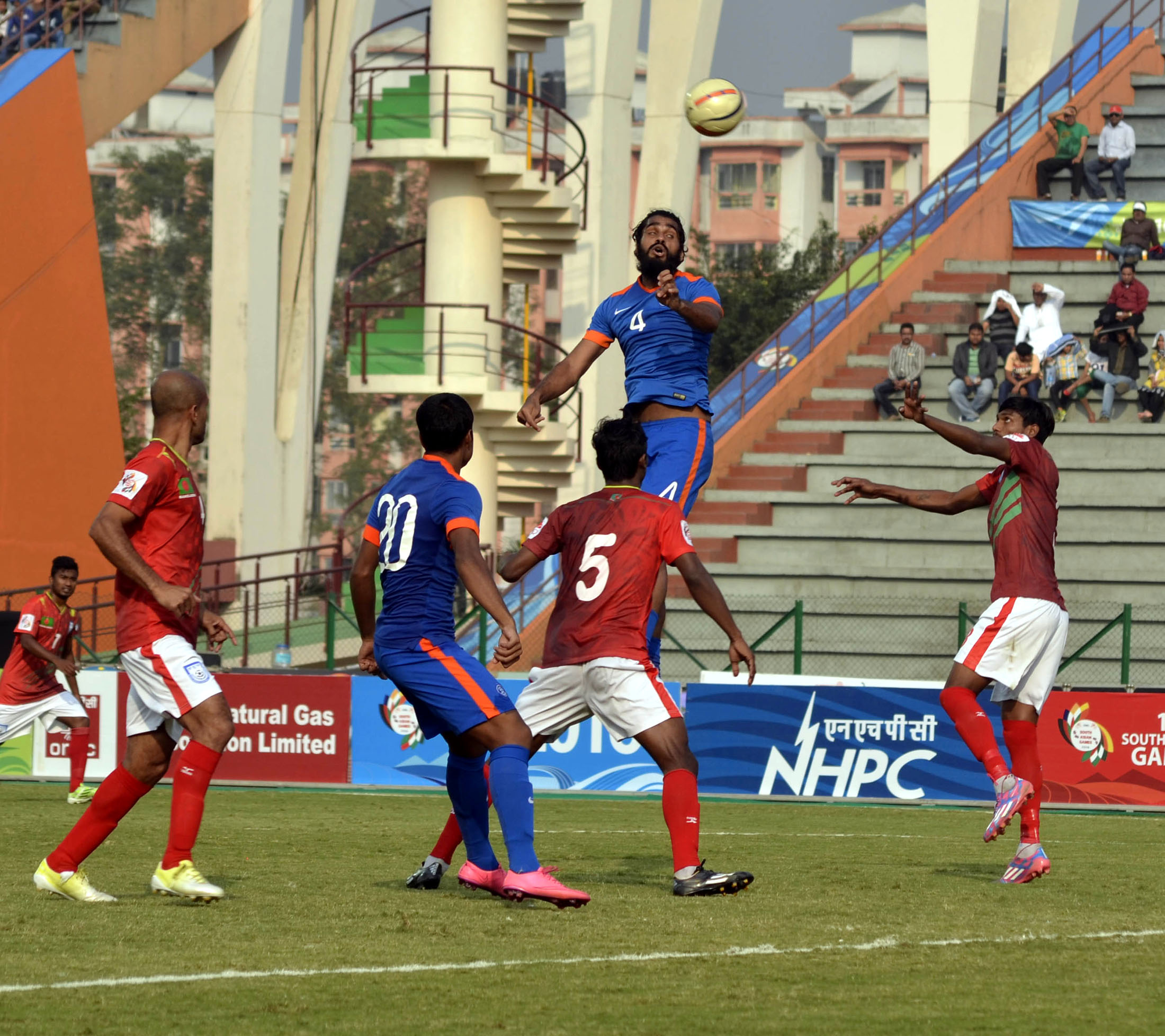
Bangladesh in action against India at the 2016 South Asian Games.

Bangladesh participated in the 2016 South Asian Games in hopes to defend their title. They qualified for the semi-finals, following a 2–1 victory over Nepal in the final group-stage game. However, the team bowed out of the tournament after suffering a 0–3 defeat at the hands of India. During the match Bangladesh coach Gonzalo Sanchez was sent off for shouting at a referee for denying his team a penalty. Bangladesh finished the tournament by winning the Bronze medal match against Maldives on penalties.

==== 2018 Asian Games ====
Bangladesh began preparation for the 2018 Asian Games by playing practice matches with different clubs from South Korea and before the start of the tournament the team's captain, Jamal Bhuyan stated "I would keep this team ahead of the one from four years ago. We have had good training and we are playing practice matches. Everyone is committed to doing well in Indonesia". On 14 August 2018, Bangladesh began their campaign with a 3–0 defeat to Uzbekistan at the Pakansari Stadium in Cibinong, Indonesia. In the following game, Mahbubur Rahman Sufil scored to earn the team a point against Thailand and kept Bangladesh's hopes of advancing past the group stages alive. On 19 August 2018, captain Jamal Bhuyan made history with his goal against Qatar which confirmed the Bangladesh's spot in the round of 16. The team suffered elimination following a 1–3 defeat in the round of 16 match to North Korea. Nonetheless, the team's performance in the tournament was celebrated all over the country.

== Recent results and fixtures ==
Win Draw Loss Fixtures

The following is a list of match results in the last 12 months, as well as any future matches that have been scheduled.

=== 2026 ===
| 1 June 2026 Diamond Jubilee Football Tournament | Bangladesh | 0–0 | Pakistan | Male, Maldives |
| 16:00 MVT; 17:00 BST | | Report | | Stadium: National Football Stadium; Attendance: 1,200; Referee: Javiz Mohamed (Maldives) |

| 4 June 2026 Diamond Jubilee Football Tournament | Afghanistan | 0–0 | Bangladesh | Malé, Maldives |
| 21:00 MVT; 22:00 BST | | Report | | Stadium: National Football Stadium; Referee: Senthilnathan Sekaran (India) |

| 7 June 2026 Diamond Jubilee Football Tournament | Bangladesh | 1–1 | Maldives | Male, Maldives |
| 21:00 MVT; 22:00 BST | Fasir 14' (pen.) | Report | Mirajul 54' (pen.) | Stadium: National Football Stadium; Attendance: 2,150; Referee: Senthilnathan Sekaran (India) |

== Coaching staff ==
=== Current personnel ===
As of 1 June 2026

| Position | Name |
|---|---|
| Head coach | (Bangladesh) Sariful Bari Titu |
| Team manager | (Bangladesh) Md Shahin Hasan |
| Assistant coach | (Bangladesh) Shahedul Alam Shahed |
| Goalkeeping coach | (Bangladesh) Nizam Mazumder |

=== Managerial history ===
As of 9 September 2025

| Manager | Country | Year | P | W | D | L | Win % | Competition(s) |
|---|---|---|---|---|---|---|---|---|
| Abdul Hakim | Bangladesh | 1991 | 8 | 3 | 0 | 5 | 37.50 | |
| György Kottán | Hungary | 2002 | 3 | 0 | 0 | 3 | 0.00 | 2002 Asian Games group stage |
| Shafiqul Islam Manik | Bangladesh | 2003 | 2 | 0 | 1 | 1 | 0.00 | |
| Shahidur Rahman Shantoo | Bangladesh | 2004 | 3 | 1 | 1 | 1 | 33.33 | 2004 South Asian Games group stage |
| Andrés Cruciani | Argentina | 2006 | 3 | 0 | 2 | 1 | 0.00 | 2006 South Asian Games group stage |
| Hasanuzzaman Bablu | Bangladesh | 2006 | 3 | 0 | 0 | 3 | 0.00 | 2006 Asian Games group stage |
| Abu Yusuf | Bangladesh | 2007 | 2 | 1 | 0 | 1 | 50.00 | |
| Zoran Đorđević | Serbia | 2010 | 4 | 4 | 0 | 0 | 100.00 | 2010 South Asian Games gold medal |
| Robert Rubčić | Croatia | 2010–2011 | 5 | 0 | 0 | 5 | 0.00 | 2010 Asian Games group stage |
| Saiful Bari Titu | Bangladesh | 2012 | 9 | 3 | 0 | 6 | 33.33 | |
| Lodewijk de Kruif | Netherlands | 2014–2015 | 9 | 2 | 1 | 6 | 22.22 | 2014 Asian Games group stage |
| Gonzalo Sanchez Moreno | Spain | 2016 | 5 | 1 | 3 | 1 | 20.00 | 2016 Bangabandhu Cup group stage 2016 South Asian Games group stage |
| Andrew Ord | England Australia | 2017 | 3 | 0 | 0 | 3 | 0.00 | |
| Jamie Day | England | 2018–2019 | 11 | 3 | 2 | 6 | 27.27 | 2018 Asian Games round of 16 |
| Maruful Haque | Bangladesh | 2021 | 3 | 0 | 0 | 3 | 0.00 | |
| Zulfiker Mahmud Mintu | Bangladesh | 2023 | 3 | 0 | 0 | 3 | 0.00 | |
| Javier Cabrera | Spain | 2023 | 3 | 0 | 1 | 2 | 0.00 | 2022 Asian Games group stage |
| Saiful Bari Titu | Bangladesh | 2025–present | 5 | 1 | 0 | 4 | 20.00 | |

== Players ==
=== Current squad ===
The following 23 players were called up for the 2026 Diamond Jubilee Tournament.

Caps and goals updated as of 7 June 2026 after the game against Maldives.

| No. | Pos. | Player | Date of birth (age) | Caps | Goals | Club |
|---|---|---|---|---|---|---|
| 1 | GK | Mehedi Hasan Srabon | 12 August 2005 (age 21) | 11 | 0 | (Bangladesh Football Federation) Bashundhara Kings |
| | GK | Ishaque Akondo | 15 July 2003 (age 23) | 0 | 0 | (Bangladesh Football Federation) Brothers Union |
| 23 | GK | Mohammad Asif | 20 October 2006 (age 20) | 1 | 0 | (Bangladesh Football Federation) Bangladesh Police |
| | DF | Rasel Hossain | 20 December 2003 (age 22) | 0 | 0 | (Bangladesh Football Federation) Fortis |
| | DF | Pronoy Enosent Marandi | 5 November 2003 (age 23) | 2 | 0 | (Bangladesh Football Federation) Fakirerpool |
| | DF | Ismail Hossen | 16 October 2004 (age 22) | 6 | 0 | (Bangladesh Football Federation) Bangladesh Police |
| | DF | Abdullah Omar Sajib | 17 October 2002 (age 24) | 3 | 0 | (Bangladesh Football Federation) Fortis |
| 3 | DF | Mithu Chowdhury | 10 November 2006 (age 20) | 3 | 0 | (Bangladesh Football Federation) Fortis |
| 4 | DF | Jahid Hasan Shanto | 1 June 2003 (age 23) | 11 | 0 | (Bangladesh Football Federation) Mohammedan |
| | DF | Monjurur Rahman Manik (Captain) | 5 September 1996 (age 30) | 4 | 0 | (Bangladesh Football Federation) Fortis |
| 24 | MF | Manik Hossain Molla (Vice-captain) | 11 March 1999 (age 27) | 6 | 0 | (Bangladesh Football Federation) Bangladesh Police |
| 20 | MF | Mojibur Rahman Jony | 1 January 2005 (age 21) | 10 | 0 | (Bangladesh Football Federation) Bashundhara Kings |
| | MF | Nazmul Huda Faysal | 5 September 2009 (age 17) | 3 | 0 | (Bangladesh Football Federation) PWD |
| | MF | Iftiar Hossain | 24 October 2006 (age 20) | 2 | 0 | (Bangladesh Football Federation) Dhaka Abahani |
| | MF | Saiful Hossain | 28 March 2008 (age 18) | 1 | 0 | (Bangladesh Football Federation) Mohammedan |
| 24 | FW | Sajed Hasan Jummon Nijum | 5 January 2004 (age 22) | 4 | 0 | (Bangladesh Football Federation) Fortis |
| | FW | Moinul Islam Moin | 18 February 2005 (age 21) | 1 | 0 | (Bangladesh Football Federation) Bangladesh Police |
| | FW | Sourav Dewan | 15 June 1998 (age 28) | 2 | 0 | (Bangladesh Football Federation) Mohammedan |
| 9 | FW | Piash Ahmed Nova | 25 September 2005 (age 21) | 9 | 0 | (Bangladesh Football Federation) Fortis |
| 10 | FW | Al-Amin | 29 March 2004 (age 22) | 8 | 1 | (Bangladesh Football Federation) Dhaka Abahani |
| 17 | FW | Mirajul Islam | 1 October 2006 (age 20) | 8 | 2 | (Bangladesh Football Federation) Dhaka Abahani |
| 18 | FW | Rabby Hossen Rahul | 30 December 2006 (age 19) | 7 | 0 | (Bangladesh Football Federation) Bangladesh Police |
| | FW | Murshed Ali | 20 March 2009 (age 17) | 3 | 0 | (Bangladesh Football Federation) Fortis |

=== Recent call-ups ===
The following players have been called up within the last 12 months.

| Pos. | Player | Date of birth (age) | Caps | Goals | Club | Latest call-up |
|---|---|---|---|---|---|---|
| GK | Shakib Al Hasan | 11 September 2004 (age 22) | 1 | 0 | (Bangladesh) Mohammedan | 2026 Diamond Jubilee Tournament^{PRE} |
| GK | Md Emon | 9 March 2006 (age 20) | 0 | 0 | (Bangladesh) Brothers Union | v. Bahrain; 18 August 2025^{PRE} |
| DF | Sharif Uddin Nirob | 1 January 2008 (age 18) | 0 | 0 | Bangladesh Police | 2026 Diamond Jubilee Tournament^{PRE} |
| DF | Md Ratul | 11 July 2006 (age 20) | 0 | 0 | Bangladesh Police | 2026 Diamond Jubilee Tournament^{PRE} |
| DF | Md Yusuf Ali | 10 August 2007 (age 19) | 0 | 0 | (Bangladesh) Bashundhara Kings | 2026 Diamond Jubilee Tournament^{PRE} |
| DF | Shakil Ahad Topu | 6 April 2006 (age 20) | 5 | 0 | (Bangladesh) Mohammedan | 2026 AFC U-23 ACQ |
| DF | Kamacai Marma Aky | 12 July 2005 (age 21) | 2 | 0 | (Bangladesh) Fortis | 2026 AFC U-23 ACQ |
| DF | Zayyan Ahmed | 29 January 2004 (age 22) | 5 | 0 | (United Arab Emirates) Rimal Al-Sahra SC | 2026 AFC U-23 ACQ |
| DF | Rimon Hossain | 1 July 2005 (age 21) | 5 | 0 | (Bangladesh) Bashundhara Kings | 2026 Diamond Jubilee Tournament^{PRE} |
| DF | Rajon Howladar | 1 December 2005 (age 20) | 2 | 0 | (Bangladesh) Rahmatganj MFS | 2026 AFC U-23 ACQ^{PRE} |
| DF | Mohammed Jahid Hasan | 1 June 2002 (age 24) | 0 | 0 | (Bangladesh) Bashundhara Kings | v. Bahrain; 18 August 2025^{PRE} |
| DF | Alfaj Miah | 10 February 2003 (age 23) | 0 | 0 | (Bangladesh) Rahmatganj MFS | 2026 Diamond Jubilee Tournament^{PRE} |
| MF | Chandon Roy | 4 May 2007 (age 19) | 0 | 0 | (Bangladesh) Bashundhara Kings | 2026 Diamond Jubilee Tournament^{PRE} |
| MF | Shekh Morsalin | 19 February 2005 (age 21) | 4 | 1 | (Bangladesh) Dhaka Abahani | 2026 AFC U-23 ACQ |
| MF | Cuba Mitchell | 23 November 2005 (age 20) | 2 | 0 | (Bangladesh) Bashundhara Kings | 2026 AFC U-23 ACQ |
| MF | Md Sabbir Hossen | 28 June 2003 (age 23) | 8 | 0 | (Bangladesh) Bashundhara Kings | 2026 AFC U-23 ACQ |
| MF | Mohsin Ahmed | 9 January 2005 (age 21) | 5 | 1 | (Bangladesh) Bashundhara Kings | 2026 AFC U-23 ACQ |
| MF | Ashraful Haque Asif | 5 June 2005 (age 21) | 1 | 0 | (Bangladesh) Mohammedan | 2026 AFC U-23 ACQ^{PRE} |
| FW | Md Manik | 11 December 2009 (age 16) | 0 | 0 | (Bangladesh) PWD | 2026 Diamond Jubilee Tournament^{PRE} |
| FW | Md Jewel Mia | 15 November 1998 (age 27) | 0 | 0 | (Bangladesh) Mohammedan | 2026 Diamond Jubilee Tournament^{PRE} |
| FW | Mohammed Nazim Uddin | 11 September 2006 (age 20) | 0 | 0 | (Bangladesh) Arambagh KS | 2026 Diamond Jubilee Tournament^{PRE} |
| FW | Md Asadul Molla | 26 December 2006 (age 19) | 0 | 0 | (Bangladesh) Dhaka Abahani | 2026 Diamond Jubilee Tournament^{PRE} |
| FW | Md Yasin Arafat Sifat | | 0 | 0 | (Bangladesh) Brothers Union | 2026 Diamond Jubilee Tournament^{PRE} |
| MF | Tanil Salik | 29 September 2006 (age 20) | 4 | 0 | (England) Wealdstone U23 | 2026 Diamond Jubilee Tournament^{INJ} |
| FW | Fahamedul Islam | 30 June 2006 (age 20) | 2 | 1 | (Italy) Olbia | 2026 Diamond Jubilee Tournament^{PRE} |
| FW | Md Rafiqul Islam | 12 February 2004 (age 22) | 8 | 0 | (Bangladesh) Rahmatganj MFS | 2026 AFC U-23 ACQ^{PRE} |
| FW | Arman Foysal Akash | 13 January 2004 (age 22) | 7 | 1 | (Bangladesh) PWD | 2026 AFC U-23 ACQ |
| FW | Razu Ahmed Zisan | 10 February 2005 (age 21) | 2 | 0 | (Bangladesh) Mohammedan | 2026 AFC U-23 ACQ |
^{INJ} Withdrew due to injury^{PRE} Preliminary squad / standby^{COV} Withdrew due to COVID-19^{RET} Retired from the national team^{SUS} Serving suspension^{WD} Player withdrew from the squad due to non-injury issue.

== Competition records ==
=== Olympic Games ===
| Olympic Games record | | | | | | | | | | Qualifications | | | | | |
| Year | Result | Position | GP | W | D | L | GS | GA | Squad | GP | W | D | L | GS | GA |
|---|---|---|---|---|---|---|---|---|---|---|---|---|---|---|---|
| (Spain) 1992 | Did not qualify | | | | | | | | | 8 | 3 | 0 | 5 | 14 | 15 |
| (United States) 1996 | Did not participate | | | | | | | | | Did not participate | | | | | |
| (Australia) 2000 | Did not participate | | | | | | | | | Did not participate | | | | | |
| (Greece) 2004 | Did not qualify | | | | | | | | | 2 | 0 | 1 | 1 | 0 | 3 |
| (China) 2008 | Did not qualify | | | | | | | | | 2 | 1 | 0 | 1 | 1 | 3 |
| (United Kingdom) 2012 | Did not qualify | | | | | | | | | 2 | 0 | 0 | 2 | 0 | 5 |
| (Brazil) 2016 | Did not qualify | | | | | | | | | Did not qualify | | | | | |
| (Japan) 2020 | Did not qualify | | | | | | | | | See AFC U-23 Championship qualifiers | | | | | |
| (France) 2024 | Did not qualify | | | | | | | | | See AFC U-23 Asian Cup qualifiers | | | | | |
| (United States) 2028 | To be determined | | | | | | | | | To be determined | | | | | |
| Total | 0/8 | — | 0 | 0 | 0 | 0 | 0 | 0 | — | 14 | 4 | 1 | 9 | 15 | 26 |

=== Asian Games ===
Asian Games
| Hosts | Result | Position | GP | W | D | L | GS | GA | Squad |
|---|---|---|---|---|---|---|---|---|---|
| (South Korea) 2002 Busan | Group stage | 20/24 | 3 | 0 | 0 | 3 | 1 | 9 | Squad |
| (Qatar) 2006 Doha | Round 2 | 24/30 | 3 | 0 | 0 | 3 | 2 | 13 | Squad |
| (China) 2010 Guangzhou | Group stage | 24/24 | 3 | 0 | 0 | 3 | 1 | 10 | Squad |
| (South Korea) 2014 Incheon | Group stage | 20/29 | 3 | 1 | 0 | 2 | 2 | 5 | Squad |
| (Indonesia) 2018 Jakarta & Palembang | Round of 16 | 15/25 | 4 | 1 | 1 | 2 | 3 | 7 | Squad |
| (China) 2022 Hangzhou | Group stage | 20/21 | 3 | 0 | 1 | 2 | 0 | 2 | Squad |
| (Japan) 2026 Aichi & Nagoya | Did not qualify | | | | | | | | —N/a |
| (Qatar) 2030 Doha | To be determined | | | | | | | | To be determined |
| (Saudi Arabia) 2034 Riyadh | To be determined | | | | | | | | To be determined |
| Total | Round of 16 | 6/19 | 19 | 2 | 2 | 15 | 9 | 46 | — |

Asian Games History
| Season | Round | Opponent | Scores | Result | Venue |
|---|---|---|---|---|---|
| 2002 | Group stage | India | 0–3 | Loss | (South Korea) Gudeok Stadium |
| 2002 | Group stage | China | 0–3 | Loss | (South Korea) Gudeok Stadium |
| 2002 | Group stage | Turkmenistan | 1–3 | Loss | (South Korea) Gudeok Stadium |
| 2006 | Group stage | South Korea | 0–3 | Loss | (Qatar) Al-Gharafa Stadium |
| 2006 | Group stage | Bahrain | 1–5 | Loss | (Qatar) Al-Gharafa Stadium |
| 2006 | Group stage | Vietnam | 1–5 | Loss | (Qatar) Al-Gharafa Stadium |
| 2010 | Group stage | Uzbekistan | 0–3 | Loss | (China) Ying Tung Stadium |
| 2010 | Group stage | Arab Emirates | 0–3 | Loss | (China) Ying Tung Stadium |
| 2010 | Group stage | Hong Kong | 1–4 | Loss | (China) Huadu Stadium |
| 2014 | Group stage | Afghanistan | 1–0 | Won | (South Korea) Munhak Stadium |
| 2014 | Group stage | Uzbekistan | 0–3 | Loss | (South Korea) Wa~ Stadium |
| 2014 | Group stage | Hong Kong | 1–2 | Loss | (South Korea) Hwaseong Sports Town |
| 2018 | Group stage | Uzbekistan | 0–3 | Loss | (Indonesia) Pakansari Stadium |
| 2018 | Group stage | Thailand | 1–1 | Draw | (Indonesia) Pakansari Stadium |
| 2018 | Group stage | Qatar | 1–0 | Won | (Indonesia) Patriot Candrabhaga Stadium |
| 2018 | Round of 16 | North Korea | 1–3 | Loss | (Indonesia) Wibawa Mukti Stadium |
| 2022 | Group stage | Myanmar | 0–1 | Loss | (China) Yellow Dragon Sports Center |
| 2022 | Group stage | India | 0–1 | Loss | (China) Yellow Dragon Sports Center |
| 2022 | Group stage | China | 0–0 | Draw | (China) Yellow Dragon Sports Center |

=== AFC U-23 Asian Cup ===
| AFC U-23 Championship record | | | | | | | | | | AFC U-23 qualification record | | | | | |
| Year | Result | Position | GP | W | D | L | GS | GA | Squad | GP | W | D | L | GS | GA |
|---|---|---|---|---|---|---|---|---|---|---|---|---|---|---|---|
| (Oman) 2013 | Did not qualify | | | | | | | | | 4 | 0 | 0 | 4 | 3 | 14 |
| (Qatar) 2016 | Did not qualify | | | | | | | | | 3 | 0 | 1 | 2 | 0 | 8 |
| (China) 2018 | Did not qualify | | | | | | | | | 3 | 0 | 0 | 3 | 1 | 13 |
| (Thailand) 2020 | Did not qualify | | | | | | | | | 3 | 1 | 0 | 2 | 2 | 2 |
| (Uzbekistan) 2022 | Did not qualify | | | | | | | | | 2 | 0 | 0 | 2 | 0 | 4 |
| (Qatar) 2024 | Did not qualify | | | | | | | | | 3 | 0 | 0 | 3 | 0 | 6 |
| (Saudi Arabia) 2026 | Did not qualify | | | | | | | | | 3 | 1 | 0 | 2 | 4 | 4 |
| (Japan) 2028 | To be determined | | | | | | | | | To be determined | | | | | |
| Total | 0/8 | — | 0 | 0 | 0 | 0 | 0 | 0 | — | 18 | 1 | 1 | 16 | 6 | 47 |

=== South Asian Games ===
South Asian Games
| Hosts / Year | Result | Position | GP | W | D | L | GS | GA |
|---|---|---|---|---|---|---|---|---|
| (Pakistan) 2004 | Group stage | 5/8 | 3 | 1 | 1 | 1 | 2 | 2 |
| (Sri Lanka) 2006 | Group stage | 6/8 | 3 | 0 | 2 | 1 | 2 | 3 |
| (Bangladesh) 2010 | Champion | 1/8 | 5 | 5 | 0 | 0 | 13 | 0 |
| (India) 2016 | Third place | 3/6 | 4 | 2 | 1 | 1 | 5 | 7 |
| (Nepal) 2019 | Third place | 3/5 | 4 | 1 | 1 | 2 | 2 | 3 |
| Total | 6/41 | 1 Title | 19 | 9 | 5 | 5 | 24 | 15 |

South Asian Games History
| Season | Round | Opponent | Scores | Result | Venue |
|---|---|---|---|---|---|
| 2004 | Group stage | India | 0–0 | Draw | (Pakistan) Army Stadium (Pakistan) Army Stadium (Pakistan) Jinnah Stadium |
| 2004 | Group stage | Afghanistan | 2–1 | Won | (Pakistan) Army Stadium (Pakistan) Army Stadium (Pakistan) Jinnah Stadium |
| 2004 | Group stage | Pakistan | 0–1 | Loss | (Pakistan) Army Stadium (Pakistan) Army Stadium (Pakistan) Jinnah Stadium |
| 2006 | Group stage | Nepal | 1–1 | Draw | (Sri Lanka) Sugathadasa Stadium |
| 2006 | Group stage | Afghanistan | 0–0 | Draw | (Sri Lanka) Sugathadasa Stadium |
| 2006 | Group stage | India | 1–2 | Loss | (Sri Lanka) Sugathadasa Stadium |
| 2010 | Group stage | Nepal | 3–0 | Won | (Bangladesh) Bangabandhu Stadium |
| 2010 | Group stage | Bhutan | 4–0 | Won | (Bangladesh) Bangabandhu Stadium |
| 2010 | Group stage | Maldives | 1–0 | Won | (Bangladesh) Bangabandhu Stadium |
| 2010 | Semi-finals | India | 1–0 | Won | (Bangladesh) Bangabandhu Stadium |
| 2010 | Final | Afghanistan | 4–0 | Won | (Bangladesh) Bangabandhu Stadium |
| 2016 | Group stage | Bhutan | 1–1 | Draw | (India) SAI Centre |
| 2016 | Group stage | Nepal | 2–1 | Won | (India) SAI Centre |
| 2016 | Semi-finals | India | 0–3 | Loss | (India) SAI Centre |
| 2016 | Bronze medal match | Maldives | 1–1 (5–4 p) | Draw | (India) SAI Centre |
| 2019 | Group stage | Bhutan | 0–1 | Loss | (Nepal) Dasharath Rangasala |
| 2019 | Group stage | Maldives | 1–1 | Draw | (Nepal) Dasharath Rangasala |
| 2019 | Group stage | Sri Lanka | 1–0 | Won | (Nepal) Dasharath Rangasala |
| 2019 | Group stage | Nepal | 0–1 | Loss | (Nepal) Dasharath Rangasala |

== Head-to-head record ==
The team's head-to-head records against all 28 nations (all of them from AFC) whom they have played to date, including friendly internationals.

As of 7 June 2026.

Bangladesh national under-23 football team head-to-head records
| Opponent | Confederation | Pld | W | D | L | GF | GA | GD | Win% |
|---|---|---|---|---|---|---|---|---|---|
| Afghanistan | AFC | 4 | 3 | 1 | 0 | 7 | 1 | +6 | 75.00 |
| Afghanistan A | AFC | 1 | 0 | 1 | 0 | 0 | 0 | +0 | 0.00 |
| Bahrain | AFC | 4 | 0 | 0 | 4 | 3 | 11 | −8 | 0.00 |
| Bhutan | AFC | 3 | 0 | 1 | 2 | 2 | 7 | −5 | 0.00 |
| China | AFC | 2 | 0 | 1 | 1 | 0 | 3 | −3 | 0.00 |
| Hong Kong | AFC | 4 | 1 | 0 | 3 | 3 | 9 | −6 | 25.00 |
| India | AFC | 6 | 0 | 2 | 4 | 1 | 9 | −8 | 0.00 |
| Jordan | AFC | 2 | 0 | 0 | 2 | 0 | 10 | −10 | 0.00 |
| Kuwait | AFC | 3 | 0 | 0 | 3 | 0 | 6 | −6 | 0.00 |
| Malaysia | AFC | 3 | 1 | 0 | 2 | 1 | 3 | −2 | 33.33 |
| Maldives | AFC | 4 | 2 | 2 | 0 | 5 | 3 | +2 | 50.00 |
| Maldives A | AFC | 1 | 0 | 1 | 0 | 1 | 1 | +0 | 0.00 |
| Myanmar | AFC | 3 | 0 | 1 | 2 | 0 | 4 | −4 | 0.00 |
| Nepal | AFC | 8 | 3 | 1 | 4 | 9 | 8 | +1 | 37.50 |
| North Korea | AFC | 1 | 0 | 0 | 1 | 1 | 3 | −2 | 0.00 |
| Pakistan | AFC | 2 | 0 | 0 | 2 | 0 | 2 | −2 | 0.00 |
| Pakistan A | AFC | 1 | 0 | 1 | 0 | 0 | 0 | +0 | 0.00 |
| Palestine | AFC | 2 | 0 | 0 | 2 | 0 | 4 | −4 | 0.00 |
| Philippines | AFC | 3 | 2 | 0 | 1 | 11 | 1 | +10 | 66.67 |
| Qatar | AFC | 1 | 1 | 0 | 0 | 1 | 0 | +1 | 100.00 |
| Singapore | AFC | 1 | 1 | 0 | 0 | 4 | 1 | +3 | 100.00 |
| Saudi Arabia | AFC | 1 | 0 | 0 | 1 | 0 | 3 | −3 | 0.00 |
| South Korea | AFC | 3 | 0 | 0 | 3 | 0 | 10 | −10 | 0.00 |
| Sri Lanka | AFC | 3 | 2 | 0 | 1 | 3 | 1 | +2 | 66.67 |
| Syria | AFC | 1 | 0 | 0 | 1 | 0 | 4 | −4 | 0.00 |
| Tajikistan | AFC | 1 | 0 | 0 | 1 | 1 | 3 | −2 | 0.00 |
| Thailand | AFC | 4 | 0 | 1 | 3 | 3 | 11 | −8 | 0.00 |
| Turkmenistan | AFC | 1 | 0 | 0 | 1 | 1 | 3 | −2 | 0.00 |
| United Arab Emirates | AFC | 1 | 0 | 0 | 1 | 0 | 3 | −3 | 0.00 |
| Uzbekistan | AFC | 6 | 0 | 0 | 6 | 1 | 21 | −20 | 0.00 |
| Vietnam | AFC | 3 | 0 | 0 | 3 | 3 | 11 | −8 | 0.00 |
| Yemen | AFC | 2 | 0 | 0 | 2 | 1 | 6 | −5 | 0.00 |
| Total | 32 nations | 85 | 17 | 13 | 55 | 65 | 157 | −92 | 20.00% |
Last match updated was against (Singapore) Maldives on 7 June 2026.

== Honours ==
- South Asian Games
  - (gold) Gold medal (1): 2010

== See also ==
- Bangladesh national football team
- Bangladesh under-20 football team
- Bangladesh under-17 football team
- Bangladesh women's national football team
- Bangladesh women's under-20 football team
- Bangladesh women's under-17 football team
