= Football at the 1992 Summer Olympics – Men's Asian Qualifiers =

Tournament details
- Teams: 29 (from 1 confederation)

The 1992 Asian Football Confederation's Pre-Olympic Tournament was held to determine the three Asian national teams that will participate at the 1992 Summer Olympics.

== Round 1 ==
=== Group A ===
Team	Pld	W	D	L	GF	GA	GD	Pts
Qatar	8	6	1	1	16	4	+12	13
Iran	8	5	2	1	19	6	+13	12
United Arab Emirates	8	2	3	3	8	8	0	7
Yemen	8	2	3	3	7	9	−2	7
Pakistan	8	0	0	8	0	23	−23	0

30 August 1991

Yemen	1−0	Pakistan

Sanaa
30 August 1991

Qatar	2−0	Iran

6 September 1991

Iran	2−2	United Arab Emirates

6 September 1991

Yemen	1−1	Qatar

13 September 1991

Pakistan	0−4	Qatar

Qayyum Stadium, Peshawar
13 September 1991

United Arab Emirates	2−1	Yemen

18 September 1991

Yemen	1−1	Iran

18 September 1991

Pakistan	0−1	United Arab Emirates

Railway Stadium, Lahore
23 September 1991

Qatar	2−1	United Arab Emirates

23 September 1991

Iran	5−0	Pakistan

Tehran
28 September 1991

Pakistan	0−2	Yemen

Railway Stadium, Lahore
28 September 1991

Iran	2−0	Qatar

4 October 1991

United Arab Emirates	0−1	Iran

4 October 1991

Qatar	3−0	Yemen

9 October 1991

Qatar	2−0	Pakistan

Doha
9 October 1991

Yemen	0−0	United Arab Emirates

14 October 1991

Iran	2−1	Yemen

14 October 1991

United Arab Emirates	2−0	Pakistan

Dubai
20 October 1991

United Arab Emirates	0−2	Qatar

20 October 1991

Pakistan	0−6	Iran

Railway Stadium, Lahore

=== Group B ===
All matches played at Hyderabad, India

Team	Pld	W	D	L	GF	GA	GD	Pts
Kuwait	4	3	1	0	6	3	+3	7
Syria	4	2	2	0	3	1	+2	6
Oman	4	1	2	1	2	2	0	4
Lebanon	4	2	0	2	4	5	−1	4
India	4	0	1	3	3	7	−4	1

4 August 1991

India	1−1	Oman

Hyderabad
5 August 1991

Syria	0−1	Lebanon

Hyderabad
6 August 1991

Kuwait	1−0	Oman

Hyderabad
8 August 1991

India	1−3	Lebanon

Hyderabad
8 August 1991

Syria	1−1	Kuwait

Hyderabad
9 August 1991

Oman	1−0	Lebanon

Hyderabad
11 August 1991

India	0−1	Syria

Hyderabad
12 August 1991

Lebanon	1−2	Kuwait

Hyderabad
13 August 1991

Oman	0−0	Syria

Hyderabad
14 August 1991

India	1−2	Kuwait

Hyderabad

=== Group C ===
All matches played at Manama, Bahrain

Team	Pld	W	D	L	GF	GA	GD	Pts
Bahrain	3	2	0	1	10	2	+8	4
Saudi Arabia	3	2	0	1	8	3	+5	4
Jordan	3	2	0	1	9	5	+4	4
Sri Lanka	3	0	0	3	1	18	−17	0
Afghanistan	withdrew							

19 September 1991

Bahrain	6−0	Sri Lanka

(Bahrain)
19 September 1991

Saudi Arabia	1−2	Jordan

(Bahrain)
22 September 1991

Bahrain	4−0	Jordan

(Bahrain)
23 September 1991

Sri Lanka	1−5	Saudi Arabia

(Bahrain)
25 September 1991

Jordan	7−0	Sri Lanka

(Bahrain)
25 September 1991

Bahrain	0−2	Saudi Arabia

(Bahrain)

=== Group D ===
Team	Pld	W	D	L	GF	GA	GD	Pts
South Korea	8	7	1	0	30	1	+29	15
Thailand	8	5	0	3	25	9	+16	10
Malaysia	8	4	1	3	13	7	+6	9
Bangladesh	8	3	0	5	14	15	−1	6
Philippines	8	0	0	8	1	51	−50	0

18 May 1991

South Korea	10−0	Philippines
Seo Jung-won 15', 22', 27'; Na Seung-hwa 35'; Kim In-wan 44', 53'; No Jung-Yoon 63'; San Tae-yong 71'; Gweon Tae-kyu 75'; Lee Moon-seok 89'	Report

Chamshil Olympic Stadium, Seoul
18 May 1991

Bangladesh	2−3	Thailand
Masoud 45'; Sabbir 89'	Report	Nounoi 24'; Srimaka 33'; Suwannang 77'

Chamshil Olympic Stadium, Seoul

20 May 1991

Philippines	0−5	Malaysia
	Report	Adnan 26', 88'; King Kong 44', 71'; Mohktar 89'

Chamshil Olympic Stadium, Seoul
20 May 1991

South Korea	6−0	Bangladesh
	Report

Chamshil Olympic Stadium, Seoul

22 May 1991

Bangladesh	0−1	Malaysia
	Report	Adnan 38'

Chamshil Olympic Stadium, Seoul
22 May 1991

South Korea	2−1	Thailand
Seo Jung-won 51'; Kim Gi-nam 81'	Report	Khunkokekroa 66'

Chamshil Olympic Stadium, Seoul

24 May 1991

Thailand	4−1	Malaysia
Srimaka 17', 59'; Suksun Kunsut 31'; Dechpramanunphol 78'	Report	Adnan 89'

Chamshil Olympic Stadium, Seoul
Referee: Riyahi Mohamed (Iran)
24 May 1991

Philippines	0−8	Bangladesh
	Report	Nakib 11', 17', 26', 49', 72'; Mamun 75', 79'; Sabbir 90'

Chamshil Olympic Stadium, Seoul

26 May 1991

Philippines	1−7	Thailand
	Report

Chamshil Olympic Stadium, Seoul
26 May 1991

South Korea	0−0	Malaysia
	Report

Chamshil Olympic Stadium, Seoul
Referee: Riyahi Mohamed (Iran)

26 June 1991

Malaysia	1−0	Thailand

Kuala Lumpur
26 June 1991

Philippines	0−7	South Korea

Kuala Lumpur

1 July 1991

Malaysia	0−2	South Korea
	Report	Noh Jung-yoon 17'; Seo Jung-won 20'

Merdeka Stadium, Kuala Lumpur
Referee: Shizuo Takada (Japan)
1 July 1991

Thailand	4−0	Bangladesh
Suwanwela 36', 65', 85'; Jewel (o.g.)	Report

Merdeka Stadium, Kuala Lumpur

3 July 1991

Bangladesh	0−1	South Korea
	Report	Noh Jung-yoon 27'

Merdeka Stadium, Kuala Lumpur
3 July 1991

Malaysia	5−0	Philippines
Mohktar 7', 51', 58'; Ibrahim 14'; King Kong 37'	Report

Merdeka Stadium, Kuala Lumpur
Attendance: 100

5 July 1991

Bangladesh	3−0	Philippines
Uttam 20'; Nakib 51', 87'	Report

Merdeka Stadium, Kuala Lumpur
5 July 1991

Thailand	0−2	South Korea
	Report	Choi Moon-sik 70', 75'

Merdeka Stadium, Kuala Lumpur

7 July 1991

Thailand	6−0	Philippines
Suwanwela (3x); Kunsut (2x); Akson	Report

Merdeka Stadium, Kuala Lumpur
7 July 1991

Malaysia	0−1	Bangladesh
	Report	Nakib 43'

Merdeka Stadium, Kuala Lumpur

=== Group E ===
Team	Pld	W	D	L	GF	GA	GD	Pts
China	8	7	1	0	51	1	+50	15
North Korea	8	6	1	1	27	3	+24	13
Singapore	8	3	1	4	14	16	−2	7
Maldives	8	1	1	6	5	47	−42	3
Nepal	8	1	0	7	4	34	−30	2

15 August 1991

North Korea	5−0	Nepal

Pyongyang
15 August 1991

Maldives	0−12	China

Pyongyang
17 August 1991

North Korea	2−0	Singapore

Pyongyang
17 August 1991

Nepal	0−1	Maldives

Pyongyang
19 August 1991

North Korea	4−0	Maldives

Pyongyang
19 August 1991

Singapore	0−3	China

Pyongyang
21 August 1991

Nepal	0−4	China

Pyongyang
21 August 1991

Maldives	1−1	Singapore

Pyongyang
23 August 1991

Nepal	1−4	Singapore

Pyongyang
23 August 1991

North Korea	1−1	China

Pyongyang
26 August 1991

Nepal	0−5	North Korea

Beijing
26 August 1991

China	17−0	Maldives

Beijing
28 August 1991

Singapore	1−3	North Korea

Beijing
28 August 1991

Maldives	1−2	Nepal

Beijing
30 August 1991

Maldives	0−7	North Korea

Beijing
30 August 1991

China	3−0	Singapore

Beijing
1 September 1991

China	10−0	Nepal

Beijing
1 September 1991

Singapore	4−2	Maldives

Beijing
3 September 1991

Singapore	4−1	Nepal

Beijing
3 September 1991

China	1−0	North Korea

Beijing

=== Group F ===
Team	Pld	W	D	L	GF	GA	GD	Pts
Japan	6	5	0	1	14	5	+9	10
Hong Kong	6	2	3	1	6	6	0	7
Indonesia	6	1	2	3	6	10	−4	4
Chinese Taipei	6	1	1	4	5	10	−5	3
Laos	withdrew							

8 June 1991

Hong Kong	1−1	Chinese Taipei

9 June 1991

Indonesia	1−2	Japan
	Report	Masaki Sawanoburi 1'; Takeo Harada 88'

Gelora 10 November Stadium, Surabaya
Attendance: 10.000
16 June 1991

Indonesia	2−1	Chinese Taipei

16 June 1991

Hong Kong	3−1	Japan
Kentaro Ishikawa 5' (o.g.); Wong Chi Keung 9'; Lo Kai Wah 55'		Toshiya Fujita 84'

Government Stadium, Hong Kong
Attendance: 4.601
23 June 1991

Indonesia	0−0	Hong Kong

23 June 1991

Chinese Taipei	0−3	Japan

29 June 1991

Japan	2−0	Chinese Taipei

30 June 1991

Hong Kong	1−1	Indonesia
Chiu Chung-man 79' (pen.)	Report	Ansyari Lubis 33'

Government Stadium, Hong Kong
Attendance: 7.021
7 July 1991

Japan	3−0	Hong Kong
Motohiro Yamaguchi 21' 26' 44'

Matsuyama Stadium
Attendance: 20.000
13 July 1991

Chinese Taipei	3−1	Indonesia

14 July 1991

Japan	3−1	Indonesia
Tadashi Nakamura 23'; Norio Omura 73'; Masaki Sawanoburi	Report	Rochy Putiray 85'

Nagaragawa Stadium
Attendance: 9.000
14 July 1991

Chinese Taipei	0−1	Hong Kong

== Round 2 ==
All matches played in Malaysia.

Team	Pld	W	D	L	GF	GA	GD	Pts
Qatar	5	4	0	1	4	3	+1	8
South Korea	5	3	1	1	6	3	+3	7
Kuwait	5	2	2	1	8	3	+5	6
China	5	3	0	2	7	5	+2	6
Japan	5	1	1	3	8	6	+2	3
Bahrain	5	0	0	5	1	14	-13	0

18 January 1992

Qatar	1−0	Bahrain
Johar 7'

Kuala Lumpur
18 January 1992

South Korea	1−1	Kuwait
Noh Jung-yoon 32'		Al-Hadiyah 11'

Kuala Lumpur

19 January 1992

China	2−1	Japan
Cai Sheng 37'; Zhang Jun 51'		Harada 18'

Kuala Lumpur

21 January 1992

South Korea	1−0	Bahrain
Noh Jung-yoon 44'

Kuala Lumpur
21 January 1992

Qatar	1−0	China
Adel 75'

Kuala Lumpur

22 January 1992

Kuwait	1−1	Japan
Al-Khodari 80'		Omura 59'

Kuala Lumpur
24 January 1992

Qatar	1−0	South Korea
Noorallah 39'

Kuala Lumpur

25 January 1992

Kuwait	0−1	China
		Hu Zhijun 28'

Kuala Lumpur
25 January 1992

Japan	6−1	Bahrain
Miura 41', 45', 49'; Narahashi 43'; Jinno 68'; Nagai 88'		Khaled 81'

Kuala Lumpur

27 January 1992

South Korea	1−0	Japan
Kim Byung-soo 88'

Kuala Lumpur
27 January 1992

China	3−0	Bahrain

Kuala Lumpur

28 January 1992

Qatar	0−3	Kuwait
		Jasem 44'; Abdullah 69'; Fahd 81'

Kuala Lumpur

30 January 1992

South Korea	3−1	China
Gwak Kyung-keun 3'; Seo Jung-won 6'; Kim Gwi-hwa 10' (pen.)		Hao Haidong 79'

Kuala Lumpur
30 January 1992

Qatar	1−0	Japan
Zainel 48'

Kuala Lumpur
30 January 1992

Kuwait	3−0	Bahrain
Al-Huwaidi 22', 40'; Marzoug 41' (pen.)

Kuala Lumpur
