= 2017–18 in Nepalese football =

Association football events in Nepal during the 2017–18 season

Football in Nepal
- Season: 2017–18

The 2017–18 season was a season of Football in Nepal.

== National teams ==
=== Nepal Men's national football team ===
==== 2019 AFC Asian Cup qualifiers ====
Pos	Team	Pld	W	D	L	GF	GA	GD	Pts	Qualification	Philippines	Yemen	Tajikistan	Nepal
1	Philippines	6	3	3	0	13	8	+5	12	2019 AFC Asian Cup	—	2–2	2–1	4–1
2	Yemen	6	2	4	0	7	5	+2	10	2019 AFC Asian Cup	1–1	—	2–1	2–1
3	Tajikistan	6	2	1	3	10	9	+1	7		3–4	0–0	—	3–0
4	Nepal	6	0	2	4	3	11	−8	2		0–0	0–0	1–2	—

Source: AFC

Date	Opponent	Result	Score*	Venue
27 March 2018	Yemen	L	1–2	(Qatar) Suheim Bin Hamad Stadium, Doha
14 November 2017	Philippines	D	0–0	ANFA Complex, Satdobato, Lalitpur, Nepal
10 October 2017	Tajikistan	L	0–3	(Tajikistan) Pamir Stadium, Dushanbe
5 September 2017	Tajikistan	L	1–2	Dasarath Rangasala, Kathmandu, Nepal
13 June 2017	Yemen	D	0–0	Halchowk Stadium, Kathmandu, Nepal
28 March 2017	Philippines	L	1–4	(Philippines) Rizal Memorial Stadium, Manila

==== Other National Team Matches ====
Date	Opponent	Result	Score*	Venue
6 June 2017	India	L	2-0	Andheri Sports Complex, Mumbai, India

* Nepal score always listed first

=== Nepal Women's national football team ===
24 April 2017

Malaysia	4–1	Nepal
Shereilynn Ellypius 3', 54'; Nurathirah Mamats 42'; Puteri Noralisa 85'		Sagana Rana 82'

UMS Stadium, Kota Kinabalu, Malaysia
22 April 2017

Malaysia	1–1	Nepal
Dadree Rofinus 64'		Sabitra Bhandari 67'

Likas Stadium, Kota Kinabalu, Malaysia

=== Nepal national under-23 football team ===
==== 2018 AFC U-23 Championship qualification ====
Pos	Team	Pld	W	D	L	GF	GA	GD	Pts	Qualification
1	Uzbekistan	3	3	0	0	7	1	+6	9	Final tournament
2	United Arab Emirates (H)	3	2	0	1	6	2	+4	6	
3	Lebanon	3	1	0	2	3	4	−1	3	
4	Nepal	3	0	0	3	0	9	−9	0	

Source: AFC
Rules for classification: Qualification tiebreakers
(H) Hosts
15 July 2017
18:25

United Arab Emirates	5–0	Nepal
Al-Hashmi 8' (pen.), 20'; Al-Akbari 22'; Ba Wazir 33' (pen.); Al-Hammadi 60'	Report

Tahnoun bin Mohammed Stadium, Al Ain
Attendance: 5,423
Referee: Jameel Abdulhusin (Bahrain)
17 July 2017
18:25

Nepal	0–2	Uzbekistan
	Report	Tursunov 21'; Ganiev 80'

Tahnoun bin Mohammed Stadium, Al Ain
Attendance: 1,825
Referee: Ahmed Al-Ali (Jordan)
19 July 2017
21:15

Lebanon	2–0	Nepal
Kourani 29', 90'	Report

Tahnoun bin Mohammed Stadium, Al Ain
Attendance: 1,850
Referee: Jameel Abdulhusin (Bahrain)

=== Nepal national under-17 football team ===
==== 2018 AFC U-16 Championship qualification ====
Pos	Team	Pld	W	D	L	GF	GA	GD	Pts	Qualification
1	Iraq	3	2	1	0	5	0	+5	7	Final tournament
2	India	3	1	2	0	5	2	+3	5	Final tournament
3	Palestine	3	1	0	2	2	8	−6	3	
4	Nepal (H)	3	0	1	2	3	5	−2	1	

Source: AFC
Rules for classification: Qualification tiebreakers
(H) Hosts
20 September 2017
15:30

Iraq	1–0	Nepal
Mandalawi 69'	Report

Halchowk Stadium, Kathmandu
Attendance: 251
Referee: Dmitrii Mashentsev (Kyrgyzstan)
22 September 2017
15:30

Nepal	2–2	India
Chaudhary 76', 88'	Report	Rulbir 83', 85'

Halchowk Stadium, Kathmandu
Attendance: 200
Referee: Kasun Lakmal Weerakkody Karage (Sri Lanka)
24 September 2017
15:30

Palestine	2–1	Nepal
Wridat 28', 75'	Report	Chaudhary 10' (pen.)

Halchowk Stadium, Kathmandu
Attendance: 198
Referee: Yaqoub Al-Hammadi (United Arab Emirates)

==== 2017 SAFF U-15 Championship ====
Pos	Team	Pld	W	D	L	GF	GA	GD	Pts	Status
1	India	2	2	0	0	11	1	+10	6	Qualified for Knockout stage
2	Nepal (H)	2	1	0	1	7	2	+5	3	Qualified for Knockout stage
3	Maldives	2	0	0	2	0	15	−15	0	

Source: GoalNepal
(H) Hosts

Group Stage

21 August 2017
15:00

Nepal	6–0	Maldives
Brijesh Chaudhary 14', 73'; Darshan Gurung 22'; Roshan Rana Magar 38' (pen.); Akash Budha 45+1', 47'	Report

ANFA Complex, Satdobato
Referee: D.D.Indika Sendanayake (Sri Lanka)

23 August 2017
15:00

Nepal	1–2	India
Roshan Rana Magar 40' (pen.)	Report	27' Vikram Pratap Singh; 64' Ravi Bahadur Rana

ANFA Complex, Satdobato
Referee: Ugyen Dorji (Bhutan)

Semifinal

25 August 2017
15:00

Bangladesh	2–4	Nepal
Foysal Ahmed 72'; 73' Habibur Rahman	Report	5', 64' Aakash Budha Magar; 64' (o.g.) Nazmul Biswas; 90+6' Brijesh Choudhary

ANFA Complex, Satdobato
Referee: D.D. Indika Sendanayake (Sri Lanka)

Final

27 August 2017
15:00

Nepal	1–2	India
Birjesh Chaudhary 41' (pen.)	Report	59' Lalrokima; 75' Vikram Pratap Singh

ANFA Complex, Satdobato
Attendance: 5000
Referee: Golam Mourshed Choudhary (Bangladesh)

=== Nepal national under-20 football team ===
==== 2017 SAFF U18 Championship ====
Pos	Team	Pld	W	D	L	GF	GA	GD	Pts	Status
1	Nepal (C)	4	3	0	1	6	2	+4	9 (Note: Nepal ahead of Bangladesh on head-to-head points: Bangladesh 1–2 Nepal)	Champion
2	Bangladesh	4	3	0	1	9	5	+4	9	
3	India	4	2	0	2	8	7	+1	6	
4	Bhutan (H)	4	2	0	2	2	5	−3	6	
5	Maldives	4	0	0	4	1	7	−6	0	

Source: Futbol24
Rules for classification: 1) points; 2) head-to-head points; 3) head-to-head goal difference; 4) goal difference; 5) number of goals scored;
(C) Champions; (H) Hosts
Notes:
20 September 2017
16:00 UTC+06:00

Bhutan	1–0	Nepal
Orgyen Tshering 87' (pen.)

Changlimithang Stadium, Thimphu
Referee: Hussain Sinan (Maldives)
22 September 2017
16:00 UTC+06:00

Nepal	2–0	Maldives
Roman Limbu 7'; Rejin Subba 57'

Changlimithang Stadium, Thimphu
Referee: Pratik Mondal (India)
25 September 2017
19:00 UTC+06:00

Bangladesh	1–2	Nepal
Mohhamed Al-Amin 30'		22' Abhishek Rijal; 80' Roman Limbu

Changlimithang Stadium, Thimphu
Referee: Farook M. Irshad (Sri Lanka)
27 September 2017
19:00 UTC+06:00

Nepal	2–0	India
Dinesh Henjan 2', 37'

Changlimithang Stadium, Thimphu
Referee: Ugyen Dorji (Bhutan)

== Domestic Competitions ==
=== 2017-18 Martyr's Memorial A-Division League ===
The 2017–18 Martyr's Memorial A-Division League (Nepali: 2017-18 शहीद स्मारक ए डिभिजन लीग) is the upcoming edition of the Martyr's Memorial A-Division League, Nepal's highest ranked football league. The league is scheduled to begin on 30 November 2017.

=== Other Domestic Tournaments ===
Name of Tournament	Dates	Venue	Winner	Runners up
Aaha! Gold Cup	January 2017	Pokhara Rangasala	Manang Marshyangdi Club	Sahara Club (Pokhara)
Simara Gold Cup	February 2017	Simara Stadium	Sankata FC	Nepal Army Club
Budha Subba Gold Cup	February 2017	ANFA Technical Center Dharan	Sankata FC	Nepal Police Club
Nepalgunj Gold Cup	March 2017	Nepalgunj Stadium	Rupandehi XI	Sankata FC
