= 1991 Federation Cup (Bangladesh) =

11th season of the Bangladesh Federation Cup

Tournament details
- Host country: Bangladesh
- Dates: 7 – 20 October 1991
- Teams: 8
- Venue: 1 (in 1 host city)

Final positions
- Champions: Brothers Union (1st title)
- Runners-up: Mohammedan
- Third place: Dhaka Abahani

Tournament statistics
- Matches played: 16
- Goals scored: 39 (2.44 per match)
- Top scorer(s): Imtiaz Ahmed Nakib (Mohammedan) (4 goals)

The 1991 Federation Cup was the 11th edition of the tournament, the main domestic annual club football competition in Bangladesh organized by Bangladesh Football Federation (BFF). Eight clubs participated in the tournament, which was played from 7 to 20 October 1991. The winners of the tournament qualified for the AFC Club Championship while runners-up played in the Asian Cup Winner's Cup.

== Venue ==
The Dhaka Stadium and Mirpur Stadium in Dhaka were the venues used for the tournament.

Location	Name	Capacity	Image	Notes
Dhaka	Dacca Stadium	55,000		
Dhaka	Mirpur Stadium	25,000		

== Qualification stage ==
=== Group A ===
First round

27 September 1991

Wari	2–0	Rajshahi Division
Jinnah 4' (pen.); Mosharaf Hossain Tutul 30'

Dhaka Stadium, Dhaka
Referee: A. R. Alam
27 September 1991

Dhanmondi	0–0 (a.e.t.)	Sadharan Bima
Penalties
Ata (penalty scored); Biswajit (penalty scored); Saif (penalty scored); Faysal (penalty missed); Aziz (penalty missed); Badal (penalty scored)	4–3	Badal (penalty scored); Basu (penalty scored); Mahmud (penalty scored); Sawpan (penalty missed); Jahangir (penalty missed); Tipu (penalty missed)

Dhaka Stadium, Dhaka

Semi-final

1 October 1991

Wari	0–0 (a.e.t.)	BRTC
Penalties
Choton (penalty scored); Kabir (penalty missed); Hannan (penalty missed)	1–3	Latu (penalty scored); Mukul (penalty scored); Prashanta Das (penalty scored)

Dhaka Stadium, Dhaka
Referee: Subhas Roy

Final

4 October 1991
16:00 (BST)

BRTC	0–0 (a.e.t.)	Dhanmondi
Penalties
Manju (penalty scored); Gautam (penalty missed); Chanchal (penalty missed); Masud (penalty missed)	1–3	Ata (penalty scored); Biswajit (penalty scored); Saiful (penalty scored)

Dhaka Stadium, Dhaka
Referee: Eishan Chowdhury

=== Group B ===
First round

28 September 1991
18:00 (BST)

Dhaka Wanderers	2–2 (a.e.t.)	Arambagh
Mosharaf		Sohel
Penalties
Mostakim (penalty scored); Mosharaf (penalty scored); Helal (penalty scored)	3–2	Mukul (penalty scored); Anwar (penalty scored)

Dhaka Stadium, Dhaka
28 September 1991
16:00 (BST)

Agrani Bank	0–0 (a.e.t.)	Eskaton
Penalties
Jamal (penalty scored); Kala (penalty scored); Bhaktiar Uddin (penalty scored)	3–2	Dablu (penalty scored); Shaymol (penalty scored)

Dhaka Stadium, Dhaka

Semi-final

1 October 1991

PWD	0–0 (a.e.t.)	Agrani Bank
Penalties
Rakib (penalty scored); Sujit (penalty scored); Jewel (penalty scored); Aman (penalty scored)	4–3	Kala (penalty scored); Sumon (penalty scored); Petar (penalty scored)

Dhaka Stadium, Dhaka
Referee: Golam Mostafa

Final

4 October 1991
18:00 (BST)

Dhaka Wanderers	0–0 (a.e.t.)	PWD
Penalties
Disju (penalty scored); Mostakim (penalty scored); Moin (penalty scored); Ujjal (penalty scored)	4–3	Rakib (penalty scored); Sujit (penalty scored); Shamsuddin (penalty scored)

Dhaka Stadium, Dhaka
Referee: Hashem Uddin

=== Group C ===
First round

29 September 1991

Victoria	0–0 (a.e.t.)	Khulna Division
Penalties
Sagor (penalty scored); Shankar (penalty scored); Tarek (penalty scored); Mamun Babu (penalty scored); Taufiq (penalty scored); Anowar (penalty scored); Pradip (penalty scored)	7–6	Halim (penalty scored); Lasu (penalty scored); Dipankar (penalty scored); Shakil (penalty scored); Joynal (penalty scored); Hannan (penalty scored)

Dhaka Stadium, Dhaka
29 September 1991

Fakirerpool	1–0	Adamjee
Mossey 50' (pen.)

Dhaka Stadium, Dhaka

Semi-final

2 October 1991

Victoria	1–0	Rahmatganj MFS
Shankar 60'

Dhaka Stadium, Dhaka
Referee: Rafiqul Islam

Final

5 October 1991
16:00 (BST)

Fakirerpool	3–1	Victoria
Masud 28'; Mehedi 36'		Mamunul 71'

Dhaka Stadium, Dhaka

=== Group D ===
First round

30 September 1991
16:00 (BST)

Bangladesh Army	10–2	Police
Mujibor; Sodrul; Shafiqul; Muktar		Mokul; Ashutosh

Dhaka Stadium, Dhaka
Referee: Nasir Chowdhury
30 September 1991
18:00 (BST)

Dhaka Division	0–0 (a.e.t.)	BJMC
Penalties
Shipu (penalty scored); Jhonun (penalty scored); Babul (penalty scored)	3–1	Shukumar (penalty scored); Monir (penalty missed); Molla (penalty missed)

Dhaka Stadium, Dhaka

Semi-final

2 October 1991

Farashganj SC	4–0	Dhaka Division
Shimu 14', 57', 76'; Nantu

Dhaka Stadium, Dhaka
Referee: Mahbubur Rahman

Final

5 October 1991
18:00 (BST)

Bangladesh Army	0–0 (a.e.t.)	Farashganj
Penalties
Ashghar (penalty scored); Ershad (penalty scored); Mujibur (penalty scored)	3–2	Nantu (penalty scored); Raj (penalty scored)

Dhaka Stadium, Dhaka
Referee: Nazir Hossain

== Round robin league ==
=== Group A ===
Pos	Team	Pld	W	D	L	GF	GA	GD	Pts	Qualification
1	Mohammedan	3	3	0	0	8	1	+7	6	Advance to the semi-finals
2	Fakirerpool	3	2	0	1	3	2	+1	4	Advance to the semi-finals
3	Muktijoddha	3	0	1	2	2	6	−4	1	
4	Dhaka Wanderers	3	0	1	2	2	6	−4	1	

Source: RSSSF
7 October 1991
16:00 (BST)

Mohammedan	1–0	Fakirerpool
Montu 82' (o.g.)

Dhaka Stadium, Dhaka
Attendance: 25,000
Referee: Nasir Chowdhury
7 October 1991
18:00 (BST)

Muktijoddha	1–1	Dhaka Wanderers
Zia Ul Haque Babu 72' (pen.)		Belal 67'

Dhaka Stadium, Dhaka
Referee: Monirul Islam

9 October 1991
16:00 (BST)

Muktijoddha	0–1	Fakirerpool
		Bhola 50'

Dhaka Stadium, Dhaka
Referee: Sheikh Badruddin
9 October 1991
18:00 (BST)

Mohammedan	3–0	Dhaka Wanderers
Kaiser 18' (pen.); Nakib 61'; Johnny 62'

Dhaka Stadium, Dhaka
Referee: AR Alam

11 October 1991
18:00 (BST)

Mohammedan	4–1	Muktijoddha
Chandan 40'; Nakib 42', 59'; Sabbir 75'		Foyez 84'

Dhaka Stadium, Dhaka
Referee: Mozaffar Hossain
11 October 1991
18:00 (BST)

Fakirerpool	2–1	Dhaka Wanderers
Sawpan 48' (pen.); Bhola 81'		Mostakim 72'

Dhaka Stadium, Dhaka
Referee: M.R. Mokul

=== Group B ===
Pos	Team	Pld	W	D	L	GF	GA	GD	Pts	Qualification
1	Brothers Union	3	3	0	0	4	1	+3	6	Advance to the semi-finals
2	Dhaka Abahani	3	2	0	1	9	2	+7	4	Advance to the semi-finals
3	Dhanmondi	3	1	0	2	3	2	+1	2	
4	Bangladesh Army	3	0	0	3	0	11	−11	0	

Source: RSSSF
8 October 1991
16:00 (BST)

Dhaka Abahani	1–0	Dhanmondi
Mamun 50'

Dhaka Stadium, Dhaka
Referee: Mozzafar Hossain
8 October 1991
18:00 (BST)

Brothers Union	1–0	Bangladesh Army
Ahmed Ali 50'

Dhaka Stadium, Dhaka
Referee: Mahbubur Rahman

10 October 1991
16:00 (BST)

Brothers Union	1–0	Dhanmondi
Sadekul Islam Uttam 39'

Dhaka Stadium, Dhaka
Referee: Abdul Khalek
10 October 1991
18:00 (BST)

Dhaka Abahani	7–0	Bangladesh Army
Alamgir 1'; Aslam 4', 87'; Mamun 13'; Rumi 32', 64', 89'

Dhaka Stadium, Dhaka
Referee: Monirul Islam

12 October 1991
16:00 (BST)

Dhanmondi	3–0	Bangladesh Army
Iqbal; Kabir; Faysal

Dhaka Stadium, Dhaka
Referee: Rafiqul Islam
12 October 1991
18:00 (BST)

Brothers Union	2–1	Dhaka Abahani
Wasim 38'; Pijush Nandi 69'		Masoud 50'

Dhaka Stadium, Dhaka
Referee: Monirul Islam

== Knockout stage ==
=== Semi-finals ===
16 October 1991
17:00 (BST)

Mohammedan	1–1 (a.e.t.)	Dhaka Abahani
Nakib 6'		Munna 74'
Penalties
Kaiser (penalty scored); Nakib (penalty scored); Sabbir (penalty missed); Johnny (penalty scored); Jewel (penalty scored); Titu (penalty scored)	5–4	Masud (penalty missed); Aslam (penalty scored); Munna (penalty scored); Ranjit (penalty scored); Rumi (penalty scored); Gauss (penalty missed)

Mirpur Stadium, Dhaka
Referee: M.R. Mukul
17 October 1991
17:00 (BST)

Brothers Union	3–0	Fakirerpool
Samrat 13', 72', 75'

Mirpur Stadium, Dhaka
Referee: Sheikh Badruddin

=== Third place ===
19 October 1991
16:30 (BST)

Dhaka Abahani	2–1	Fakirerpool
Mamun 38'; Aslam 59'		Masud 25'

Mirpur Stadium, Dhaka
Referee: Nasir Chowdhury

=== Final ===
20 October 1991
16:30 (BST)

Brothers Union	0–0 (a.e.t.)	Mohammedan
Penalties
Rouf Babul (penalty scored); Manik (penalty scored); Parvez Hossain (penalty scored); Pijush Nandi (penalty scored)	4–2	Kaiser (penalty scored); Nakib (penalty missed); Sabbir (penalty scored); Johnny (penalty missed)

Mirpur Stadium, Dhaka
Referee: Sheikh Badruddin

=== History ===
Brothers Union	Mohammedan

GK	(Bangladesh) Mohammed Ponir
RB	(Bangladesh) Pijush Nandi
LB	(Bangladesh) Parvez Hossain
CB	(Bangladesh) Arif Hossain Moon	Booked
CB	(Bangladesh) Ataur Rahman Khan
CB	(Bangladesh) Iqbalur Rahman Iqbal
MF	(Bangladesh) Sadekul Islam Uttam
MF	(Bangladesh) Nurul Haque Manik (c)
MF	(Bangladesh) Satyajit Das Rupu
CF	(Bangladesh) Wasim Iqbal		Substituted on
CF	(Bangladesh) Samrat		Substituted on
Substitutions:
CB	(Bangladesh) Rouf Babul		Substituted on
CF	(Bangladesh) Ahmed Ali	Booked	Substituted on
Head coach:
(Bangladesh) Shahid Uddin Ahmed Selim

GK	(Bangladesh) Sayeed Hassan Kanan (c)
RB	(Bangladesh) Shamim Hossain
LB	(Bangladesh) Abul Hossain
CB	(Bangladesh) Kaiser Hamid	Booked
CB	(Bangladesh) Jewel Rana
MF	(Bangladesh) Imtiaz Sultan Johnny
MF	(Bangladesh) Mahabub Hossain Roksy		Substituted off
MF	(Bangladesh) Saiful Bari Titu
RW	(Bangladesh) Rumman Bin Wali Sabbir
CF	(Bangladesh) Imtiaz Ahmed Nakib
LW	(Bangladesh) Riyaz Uddin		Substituted off
Substitutions:
MF	(Bangladesh) Reza		Substituted on
MF	(Maldives) Chandan	Booked	Substituted on
Manager:
(Iran) Nasser Hejazi

== See also ==
- 1991–92 Dhaka First Division Football League
- 1991 BTC Club Cup
