= 2014 Aaha! Rara Gold Cup =

12th Aaha! Rara Gold Cup

Tournament details
- Country: Nepal
- Dates: 4 – 15 March
- Teams: 12

Final positions
- Champions: Sahara Club (Pokhara) (1st title)
- Runners-up: Manang Marshyangdi Club

Tournament statistics
- Matches played: 11
- Top goal scorer: Sujal Shrestha (4 goals)

Awards
- Best player: Heman Gurung

The 2014 Aaha! Rara Gold Cup was the 12th edition of the Aaha Gold Cup held in Pokhara and organised by Sahara Club. 12 teams participated in the tournament. The defending champions Three Star Club have chosen not to compete. All matches were held at the Pokhara Rangasala. Due to a sponsorship deal with Him-Shree Foods (a Pokhara-based food company), the tournament is officially known as the 12th Aaha! Rara Gold Cup 2014. Which is named after its flagship product, "RARA" instant noodles.

== Sponsorship ==
Main sponsors of the tournament, Him Shree Foods Pvt Ltd provided 900,000 NPR to the organisers as the title sponsors.

Main Sponsors	Partners
Him Shree Foods	GoalNepal.com
Red Bull	GoalNepal.com
Colors TeleTech	GoalNepal.com
TVS Motor Company	GoalNepal.com
Royal Big Master Wine	GoalNepal.com

== Participating teams ==
- 1st RGR XI, Brunei
- (Nepal) APF Club
- (Nepal) Dharan F.C.
- (Nepal) Jawalakhel Youth Club
- (Nepal) Machhindra Football Club
- (Nepal) Manang Marshyangdi Club
- Nepal Army Club
- Nepal Police Club
- Nepal U-16
- (Nepal) Sahara Club (Pokhara) (Hosts)
- (Nepal) Sankata Club
- (Nepal) Saraswoti Youth Club

== 1st round ==
4 March 2014	Nepal U-16	1–1 (a.e.t.) (2-4 p)	APF Club	Pokhara Rangasala, Pokhara

5 March 2014	Dharan F.C.	2–1	Nepal Army Club	Pokhara Rangasala, Pokhara

6 March 2014	1st RGR, Brunei	2–5	Saraswati Youth Club	Pokhara Rangasala, Pokhara

7 March 2014	Sankata Club	1–0	Jawalakhel Youth Club	Pokhara Rangasala, Pokhara

== Knockout stage ==
Quarter-finals
Sahara Club (Pokhara)	1
APF Club	0
Saraswati Youth Club	1
Machhindra Football Club	3
Nepal Police Club	2
Dharan F.C.	0
Manang Marshyangdi Club	2
Sankata Club	0

Semi-finals
Sahara Club (Pokhara)	0(4)
Machhindra Football Club	0(3)
Nepal Police Club	0
Manang Marshyangdi Club	5

Final
Sahara Club (Pokhara)	1
Manang Marshyangdi Club	0

== Matches ==
=== Quarter-finals ===
8 March 2014	Sahara Club (Pokhara)	1–0	APF Club	Pokhara Rangasala, Pokhara

9 March 2014	Nepal Police Club	2–0	Dharan F.C.	Pokhara Rangasala, Pokhara

10 March 2014	Saraswati Youth Club	1–3	Machhindra Football Club	Pokhara Rangasala, Pokhara

11 March 2014	Manang Marshyangdi Club	2–0	Sankata Club	Pokhara Rangasala, Pokhara

=== Semi-finals ===
12 March 2014	Sahara Club (Pokhara)	0–0 (a.e.t.) (4–3 p)	Machhindra Football Club	Pokhara Rangasala, Pokhara

12 March 2014	Manang Marshyangdi Club	5–0	Nepal Police Club	Pokhara Rangasala, Pokhara

=== Final ===
15 March 2014	Manang Marshyangdi Club	0–1	Sahara Club (Pokhara)	Pokhara Rangasala, Pokhara
14:00 (NST)			Saroj Dahal 53'	Attendance: 16,000; Referee: Laba Khatri

=== Prize money ===
Final placing	Prize money (Nepali Rupees)
Champions	396,000 NPR
Runner-up	236,000 NPR
MVP	TVS Motorbike
FIFA Fair Play Award	10,000 NPR
