= Imtiaz Sultan Johnny =

Bangladeshi footballer (born 1961)

Johnny
Personal information
- Full name: Imtiaz Sultan Johnny
- Date of birth: 15 September 1961 (age 65)
- Place of birth: Dacca, East Pakistan (present-day Dhaka, Bangladesh)
- Height: 1.74 m (5 ft 8 1/2 in)
- Positions: Left back; defensive midfielder

Senior career*
Years	Team	Apps	(Gls)
1978	Fakirerpool YMC		
1979–1981	Rahmatganj MFS		
1982–1985	Abahani Krira Chakra		
1986–1994	Dhaka Mohammedan		
1991	Kolkata Mohammedan		

International career
1982–1990	Bangladesh		
Medal record
Representing Bangladesh
South Asian Games
Silver medal – second place	1984
Silver medal – second place	1985
Silver medal – second place	1989
- * Club domestic league appearances and goals

Imtiaz Sultan Johnny (Bengali: ইমতিয়াজ সুলতান জনি; born 15 September 1961) is a retired Bangladeshi football player who also captained the Bangladesh national team. He mainly played as a left back, but could also be deployed in midfield. He is currently part of the Mohammedan SC executive committee.

== Club career ==
Johnny began his career with Fakirerpool Young Men's Club in the Dhaka Second Division Football League in 1978. During his time at the club he was deployed as a defensive midfielder. In 1981, he was brought to Rahmatganj MFS after the club's officials witnessed his performance while representing Jagannath College in an exhibition game.

In 1982, Johnny joined Abahani Krira Chakra, where he shifted to left back. With Abahani, he won hat-trick league titles from 1983 to 1985, while also captaining the team during their 1985 title triumph, as the club became the first to achieve the feat since Bangladesh's independence. Under his captaincy the club also won the domestic double by triumphing in the Federation Cup. Johnny was also part of the squad at the 1985–86 Asian Club Championship, scoring in a 2–1 victory over Nepali club New Road Team in the zonal group stage. In 1982, he represented Mohammedan SC as a guest player during its Ashis-Jabbar Shield triumph in India.

In 1986, Iranian coach Nasser Hejazi brought Johnny to arch-rivals Mohammedan, where he completed another hat-trick of league triumphs from 1986 to 1989. In his second year at the club, Mohammedan won the domestic double as unbeaten champions. He also represented the club as it reached the semi-final league round of the 1988–89 Asian Club Championship, during which the Black and Whites defeated both Iran's Persepolis and North Korea's April 25. Under Hejazi, Johnny played a crucial role in Mohammedan's defence alongside Kaiser Hamid, Rezaul Karim Rehan and Ahsanullah Montu, during what was seen as the golden period of the club's history. In 1991, he played in the Calcutta Football League for Kolkata Mohammedan. He also represented Abahani as a guest player in the 1988 IFA Shield.

== International career ==
In 1981, Johnny attended a training camp for the Bangladesh U19 team and the following year, he represented Bangladesh Green in the first President's Gold Cup held in Dhaka. In 1982, he debuted for the Bangladesh national team during the 1982 Asian Games held in New Delhi, India. He cemented his place in the national team during the 1986 FIFA World Cup qualifiers, appearing in all six qualifying games.

Johnny captained the national team during the 1985 South Asian Games, 1986 President's Gold Cup and also during the 1988 AFC Asian Cup qualifiers. He also represented the national team during both the 1986 and 1990 Asian Games. Due to injury he missed all international games in 1991 and planned to officially retire from the national team during the 1993 President's Gold Cup, however, he was not called up to the final squad.

== Post-playing career ==
Johnny has been part of Mohammedan SC's football committee and coaching panel ever since retirement, and as of 2023, is the head of technical committee.

== Personal life ==
His elder brother, Ehtesham Sultan, was a prominent hockey and football player who died on 17 August 2020.

In August 1984, Johnny was initially set to travel from Dhaka to Chittagong on the same airplane involved in the 1984 Biman Bangladesh Airlines Fokker F27 crash, before canceling his flight, as Dhaka was flooded with water.

== Honours ==
Abahani Krira Chakra

- Dhaka First Division League: 1983, 1984, 1985
- Federation Cup: 1982, 1985

Dhaka Mohammedan

- Dhaka First Division/Premier Division League: 1986, 1987, 1988–89, 1993
- Federation Cup: 1986, 1989
- Independence Cup: 1991
- Ma-O-Moni Gold Cup: 1990
- DMFA Cup: 1993
- Ashis-Jabbar Shield Tournament: 1982

Bangladesh

- South Asian Games Silver medal: 1984, 1985, 1989

Individual

- 2014 − National Sports Award.
- 1988 − Sports Writers Association's Best Footballer Award.
