= 2015 Budha Subba Gold Cup =

Tournament details
- Host country: Nepal
- City: Dharan
- Dates: 28 February to 6 March 2015
- Teams: 8
- Venue(s): ANFA Technical Center Dharan

Final positions
- Champions: (Nepal) APF Club (1st title)
- Runners-up: (Nepal) Manang Marshyangdi Club

Tournament statistics
- Matches played: 7
- Goals scored: 22 (3.14 per match)
- Top scorer(s): (Nepal) Amrit Basnet (5 goals)
- Best player(s): (Nepal) Ganesh Lawati
- Best goalkeeper: (Nepal) Amrit Chaudhary

The 2015 Budha Subba Gold Cup was the 17th edition of the Budha Subba Gold Cup held in Dharan and sponsored by Red Bull. Seven teams from Nepal and one from India participated in the tournament. All matches were held at the ANFA Technical Center Dharan. A lot of changes were made regarding the format of the tournament, the tournament took place in February as opposed to April, when it previously took place. Also, the prize money for the winning team was increased to make the tournament more attractive. Belgharia Sporting Club from Calcutta, India, who won this tournament in 1999, was also meant to join the tournament but was replaced by another Indian Team, Sikkim Sunalchu FC.

== Teams ==
Team	City
Munal Club	Chandragadhi
Dharan F.C.	Dharan
Manang Marshyangdi Club	Kathmandu
APF Club	Kathmandu
Nepal Army Club	Kathmandu
Pokhara XI	Pokhara
Lisnu Youth Club	Rupandehi
Sikkim Sunalchu FC	Sikkim, India

== Bracket ==
The following is the bracket which the 2015 Budha Subba Gold Cup resembled. Numbers in parentheses next to the match score represent the results of a penalty shoot-out.

Quarterfinals
Dharan F.C.	4
Lisnu Youth Club	0
APF Club	4
Sikkim Sunalchu FC	1
Nepal Army Club	2 (5)
Pokhara XI	2 (4)
Manang Marshyangdi Club	2
Munal Club	0

Semifinals
APF Club	3
Dharan F.C.	0
Manang Marshyangdi Club	2
Nepal Army Club	1

Final
Manang Marshyangdi Club	0
APF Club	1

== Awards and Prize Money ==
Award	Recipient	Recipient's Team	Reward
Prize Money for winning team		APF Club	NPRs 350,000
Prize Money for runners-up		Manang Marshyangdi Club	NPRs 175,000
Best Player of the Tournament Award	Ganesh Lawati	APF Club	Motorcycle (worth NPRs 180,000)
Highest Goal Scorer Award	Amrit Basnet	Nepal Army Club	NPRs 21,000
Best Coach Award	Krishna Thapa	APF Club	NPRs 10,000
Best Striker of the Tournament	Zikahi Dodoz	Manang Marshyangdi Club	NPRs 10,000
Best Midfielder of the Tournament	Sulav Maskey	Manang Marshyangdi Club	NPRs 10,000
Best Defender of the Tournament	Rajendra Rawal	APF Club	NPRs 10,000
Best Goalkeeper of the Tournament	Amrit Chaudhary	APF Club	NPRs 10,000
Emerging Player of the Tournament	Hemant Thapa	Dharan F.C.	NPRs 10,000
