= Budha Subba Gold Cup =

- Founded: 1999
- Region: Nepal
- Number of teams: 8
- Current champions: New Road Team (2nd title)
- Most successful club(s): Three Star Club (5 titles)

Budha Subba Gold Cup is an annual international club-level knockout football tournament in Nepal. The competition is held yearly in Dharan, Province No. 1 by Dharan Football Club every year in Nepal. The competition showcases the young and experienced talents from Nepal best clubs.

== Previous champions ==
Title	Year (B.S.)	Year (A.D.)	Champions	Runners-up
1	2055	1999	(India) Belgeria SC (Kolkata)	Dharan Football Club
2	2056	2000	Mahendra Police Club	Dharan Football Club
3	2057	2001	Mahendra Police Club	Dharan Football Club
4	2058	2002	(Bangladesh) Dhanmodi Club (Dhaka)	Mahendra Police Club
5	2059	2003	Mahendra Police Club	Friends Club
6	2060	2004	Manang Marshyangdi Club	Mahendra Police Club
7	2061	2005	Three Star Club	Jawalakhel Youth Club
8	2062	2006	African United Club	Dharan Football Club
9	2063	2007	Three Star Club	African United Club
10	2064	2008	New Road Team	Friends Club
11	2065	2009	Three Star Club	Nepal Army Club
12	2066	2010	Ranipokhari Corner Team	Nepal Police Club
13	2067	2011	Manang Marsyangdi Club	Sahara Club (Pokhara)
14	2068	2012	Three Star Club	Manang Marsyangdi Club
15	2069	2013	(Hong Kong) HKNFA	Nepal Army Club
16	2070	2014	African United Club	Sahara Club (Pokhara)
17	2071	2015	APF Club	Manang Marshyangdi Club
18	2072	2016	Manang Marshyangdi Club	Nepal Police Club
19	2073	2017	Nepal Police Club	Sankata Club
20	2074	2018	Three Star Club	Nepal Police Club
21	2075	2019	(Cameroon) Dauphins Family Club	Dharan Football Club
22	2076	2020	Manang Marshyangdi Club	Nepal Police
23	2079	2023	(Cameroon) AVENIR FC	KFTC (Jhapa)
24	2080	2024	New Road Team	Morang XI
25	2081	2024	New Road Team	Church Boys United

== Top performing clubs ==
Club	Champions	Runners-up
Three Star Club	5	0
Nepal Police Club (formerly Mahendra Police Club)	4	5
Manang Marshyangdi Club	3	2
African United Club	2	1
APF Club	1	0
(India) Belgeria S.C. (Kolkata)	1	0
(Bangladesh) Dhanmodi Club (Dhaka)	1	0
(Hong Kong) HKNFA	1	0
(Cameroon) Dauphins Family Club	1	0
New Road Team	2	0
Ranipokhari Corner Team	1	0
Dharan Football Club	0	5
Nepal Army Club	0	2
Friends Club	0	2
Sahara Club (Pokhara)	0	2
Jawalakhel Youth Club	0	1
Sankata Club	0	1

== See also ==
- Pokhara Cup
- Aaha! Gold Cup
- Simara Gold Cup
- Jhapa Gold Cup
- KP Oli Cup
- Tribhuvan Challenge Shield
- ANFA Cup
