= Satyajit Das Rupu =

Bangladeshi footballer

Personal information
- Full name: Satyajit Das Rupu
- Date of birth: 5 September 1964 (age 62)
- Place of birth: Chittagong, East Pakistan (present-day Bangladesh)
- Height: 1.75 m (5 ft 9 in)
- Positions: Central midfielder; right wing-back

Youth career
- 1981: Bangladesh Boys

Senior career*
Years	Team	Apps	(Gls)
1982–1983	Little Friends		
1984–1985	Farashganj		
1986–1991	Dhaka Abahani		
1992–1994	Brothers Union		
1995	Mohammedan		
1996–1999	Muktijoddha Sangsad		

International career
1986–1995	Bangladesh		
Medal record
Representing Bangladesh
South Asian Games
Silver medal – second place	1989
Bronze medal – third place	1991
SAFF Championship
Runner-up	1995
- * Club domestic league appearances and goals

Satyajit Das Rupu (Bengali: সত্যজিৎ দাস রুপু; born 9 September 1964) is a retired Bangladeshi footballer who played as a midfielder. He represented the Bangladesh national team between 1986 and 1995.

He served as Team Manager of Dhaka Abahani from 2002 to 2023, and again from 2024 to 2026.

== Early life ==
Rupu was born in Patharghata, Chittagong, to Rabindra Narayan Das, a government employee with the Sadharan Bima Corporation, and Minti Das, a homemaker. He grew up as an Dhaka Abahani supporter, and regularly played football at the St. Placid's School ground in Chittagong.

In 1976, following his father's transfer, his family moved to Gopibagh, Dhaka. While studying at Narinda Government High School, he began training under Farshad Babu at the Brothers Union ground, where he progressed through the local youth setup known as "Little Brothers" as a left-footed midfielder. In 1981, Rupu made his competitive debut in the Pioneer League, representing Bangladesh Boys Club, which primarily included players from "Little Brothers".

== Club career ==
Rupu and his teammates pooled earnings from local tournaments, along with financial support from Farshad Babu, to purchase the struggling Third Division club BH Welfare for around Tk 30,000–40,000. The club was subsequently renamed Little Friends Club, and Rupu and his teammates competed for it in the Third Division. Little Friends later earned promotion to the Second Division. In 1984, Rupu was one of the four Little Friends players to join First Division club Farashganj SC.

Following his goal in a 5–2 defeat to Dhaka Abahani in the 1985 First Division, Rupu attracted interest from the club, which he supported since childhood. Although informal contact had been made earlier through Abahani's Samrat Hossain Emily, the transfer was finalized in December while Rupu was with the Bangladesh Green team for the 1986 President's Gold Cup. Abahani officials Harun Ur Rashid and Tanvir Mazhar Tanna visited the team hotel, signed him on the spot, and paid him a transfer fee of Tk 200,000. He initially played as left-back at Abahani before securing a place in midfield, and serving as vice-captain from 1987.

Following the departure of F. I. Kamal early in the 1989 season, Rupu was appointed captain of Abahani. He led the club to the 1989–90 First Division title, as well as victories in the 1989 Sait Nagjee Football Tournament, the 1990 Independence Cup, the 1990 Azmiri Begum Gold Cup, and the 1991 BTC Club Cup, captaining the side throughout each triumph. Nevertheless, Rupu would depart in 1991, joining Brothers Union, where he would win the 1991 Federation Cup.

In 1995, Rupu joined Mohammedan, where he spent one season before retiring with Muktijoddha Sangsad KC, with whom he won the league title in the 1997–98 season. He played his final match on 4 August 1999 in a Premier Division fixture between Muktijoddha and Abahani at the Bangabandhu National Stadium, playing the first 23 minutes before being substituted by Bhaktiar Uddin.

== International career ==
Rupu was a member of the Bangladesh Green team at the 1986 President's Gold Cup under coach Abdul Hakim. Later that year, Abdul Hakim, who had taken charge of the national team, included Rupu in the Bangladesh national team squad for the 1986 Pakistan President's Gold Cup in Karachi.

Rupu was also a member of the national team at the 1987 South Asian Games, 1988 AFC Asian Cup qualification, 1990 FIFA World Cup qualification, 1989 South Asian Games, 1991 South Asian Games, 1992 AFC Asian Cup qualification, 1994 FIFA World Cup qualification, and 1993 South Asian Games. He scored his first and only international goal in a 3–1 victory over Thailand during a 1990 FIFA World Cup qualification match on 8 March 1989.

He was also a member of the Muktijoddha Sangsad KC team that represented Bangladesh at the 1994 Qatar Independence Cup. Rupu played his final international tournament as captain of Bangladesh at the 1995 SAARC Gold Cup under South Korean coach Kang Man-young. The team were eliminated in the semi-finals after losing 4–2 on penalties to India following a goalless draw.

== Administrative career ==
Rupu served as the secretary of Little Friends Club for 14 years. In 2002, Dhaka Abahani chairman Kazi Shahid Ahmed appointed him as the club coordinator, and in late 2003, he was promoted to the position of club manager, a role he held continuously until 2023. He was reappointed as the club manager in 2024 and served till 2026. Rupu attained an AFC C coaching licence in 2006. He became a member of the Bangladesh Football Federation's executive committee following the elections held in 2008, 2012, 2016, and 2024. He also served as the long-term team manager of the Bangladesh national team.

== Career statistics ==
=== International goals ===
Scores and results list Bangladesh's goal tally first.

List of international goals scored by Satyajit Das Rupu
#	Date	Venue	Opponent	Score	Result	Competition
1.	8 March 1989	Dhaka Stadium, Dhaka, Bangladesh	Thailand	3–0	3–1	1990 FIFA World Cup qualification

== Honours ==
Dhaka Abahani

- Dhaka First Division League: 1989–90
- Federation Cup: 1986
- Sait Nagjee Football Tournament: 1989
- Independence Cup: 1990
- Azmiri Begum Gold Cup: 1990
- BTC Club Cup: 1991

Brothers Union

- Federation Cup: 1991

Muktijoddha Sangsad KC

- Dhaka Premier Division League: 1997–98
- McDowell's Cup: 1998

Bangladesh

- South Asian Games Silver medal: 1989; Bronze medal: 1991
