= 2021 Aaha Rara Gold Cup =

2021 Aaha! Rara Gold Cup
Tournament details
- Country: Nepal
- Dates: 3 – 10 March
- Teams: 8

Final positions
- Champions: Sankata Club (1st title)
- Runners-up: Manang Marshyangdi Club

The 2021 Aaha! Rara Gold Cup was the 19th edition of the Aaha Gold Cup held in Pokhara and organised by Sahara Club. 8 teams participated in the tournament. All matches were held at the Pokhara Rangasala. Due to a sponsorship deal with Him-Shree Foods, the tournament is officially known as the 19th Aaha! Rara Gold Cup 2021, after "RARA" instant noodles.

== Participating teams ==
- Sahara Club (Pokhara)
- APF Club
- Machhindra Football Club
- African Roots Association
- Sankata Club
- Manang Marshyangdi Club
- Ruslan Three Star
- Nepal Police Club

== Knockout stage ==
Quarter-finals
Sahara Club (Pokhara)	0
APF Club	1
Machhindra Football Club	1
African Roots Association	2
Sankata Club	1
Manang Marshyangdi Club	0
Ruslan Three Star	0
Nepal Police Club	4

Semi-finals
Sankata Club	2
Nepal APF Club	0
African Root Association	2
Nepal Police Club	0

Final
Sankata Club	1(4)
African Roots Association	1(2)

== Matches ==
=== Quarter-finals ===
3 April 2021	Sahara Club (Pokhara)	0-1	Nepal APF Club	Pokhara Rangasala, Pokhara
			Aashish Lama 87'

4 April 2021	Machhindra F.C.	1-2	African Roots Associations	Pokhara Rangasala, Pokhara
04:00	Abhishek Rijal 91'		Moussa 23'; Njimi 82'

5 April 2021	Sankata Club	1-0	Manang Marshyangdi Club	Pokhara Rangasala, Pokhara
04:00	Fofo Na 44'

6 April 2021	Ruslan Three Star	0-4	Nepal Police Club	Pokhara Rangasala, Pokhara
			Buddha Bal Tamang 29,73'; Tej Tamang 68'; Soujan Rai 86'

=== Semi-finals ===
7 April 2021	Nepal APF Club	0-2	Sankata Club	Pokhara Rangasala, Pokhara
04:00 NST			Subash Gurung 33'; Glory 90'	Referee: Prajwal Chhetri

8 April 2021	African Roots Association	2-0	Nepal Police Club	Pokhara Rangasala, Pokhara
2:00 pm	Basscek 3'; Moussa 94'

=== Final ===
10 April 2021	Sankata Club	1-1 (a.e.t.) (4-2 p)	African Roots Association	Pokhara Rangasala, Pokhara
	Jon Glory 52'	Report	Basscek 11'	Attendance: 8000
	Penalties
	Amit Tamang (penalty scored); Saroj Dahal (penalty missed); Subash Gurung (penalty scored); Neraj Basnet (penalty scored); Ayush Ghalan (penalty scored)		(penalty missed) Kuete; (penalty scored) Ketcha Yannick; (penalty scored) Raphael Rim; (penalty missed) R. Mbakop

== Season statistics ==
=== Scoring ===
==== Top scorers ====
Rank	Player	Club	Goals
1	(Cameroon) Basscek	African Roots Association	4
1	(Cameroon) Moussa	African Roots Association	4
1	(Cameroon) Glory	Sankata Club	4
1	(Nepal) Budhha Bal Tamang	Nepal Police Club	4

== Awards ==
Award	Winner	Club
Best Player	(Nepal) Raja Babu Thapa	Sankata Club
Goalkeeper	(Nepal) Raja Babu Thapa	Sankata Club
Defender	(Nepal) Neraj Basnet	Sankata Club
Midfielder	(Cameroon) Bidias Rim Raphael	African Roots Association
Forward	(Cameroon) Basscek	African Roots Association
Head Coach	Serge Boris	African Roots Association
Fair Play Award	Nepal Police Club	
