= Hong Kong Nepalese Football Association =

HKNFA
- Full name: Hong Kong Nepalese Football Association
- Founded: 2008
Home colours

Hong Kong Nepalese Football Association (HKNFA) are an all-star association football club composed of top flight Nepalese players from various football clubs in Hong Kong. They regularly participate in the major tournament in Nepal, the Budha Subba Gold Cup.

== History ==
The Hong Kong Nepalese Football Association (HKNFA) was founded in 2008 with the aim of promoting football within the Nepalese communities in Hong Kong, especially among the youth. Deurali Football Club is one of the football clubs under HKNFA. It encourages Nepalese youth to play association football and makes a pure Nepalese football team participate in the Hong Kong League.

== See also ==
- Football in Nepal
- African United Club
