= Saiful Bari Titu =

Bangladeshi association football player and coach

Saiful Bari Titu (Syndicate)
Personal information
- Full name: AKM Saiful Bari Titu
- Date of birth: 3 August 1972 (age 54)
- Place of birth: Dhaka, Bangladesh
- Position: Defensive midfielder

Team information
- Current team: Bangladesh U23 (head coach)

Youth career
- 1984–1985: East Bengal Club

Senior career*
Years	Team	Apps	(Gls)
1985–1987	East Bengal Limited		
1987–1989	Dhanmondi Club		
1989–1994	Mohammedan		
1994–1999	Muktijoddha		
2000–2001	Mohammedan		

International career
1988	Bangladesh U17		
1990	Bangladesh U19		
1989–1993	Bangladesh	11	(0)

Managerial career
- 2005: Mohammedan (interim)
- 2005–2008: Mohammedan (assistant)
- 2009–2010: Bangladesh (assistant)
- 2010: Bangladesh (interim)
- 2011–2012: Sheikh Jamal DC
- 2012: Bangladesh U23
- 2012: Bangladesh (interim)
- 2012–2013: Mohammedan
- 2014: Bangladesh (assistant)
- 2014–2015: Bangladesh (interim)
- 2015–2016: Bangladesh (assistant)
- 2016–2017: Arambagh
- 2017–2018: Chittagong Abahani
- 2018: Dhaka Abahani (interim)
- 2018–2022: Sheikh Russel
- 2022–2023: Chittagong Abahani
- 2023–2024: Bangladesh women
- 2023–2024: Bangladesh women U20
- 2024: BFF Elite Academy
- 2024: Bangladesh U17
- 2025–: Bangladesh U23
Medal record
Representing Bangladesh
South Asian Games
Silver medal – second place	1989
- * Club domestic league appearances and goals

Saiful Bari Titu (Bengali: সাইফুল বারী টিটু; born 3 August 1972) is a Bangladeshi football coach and former football player, who currently serves as the technical director of the Bangladesh Football Federation and the head coach of the Bangladesh U23 team. He also served as the head coach of both the BFF Elite Academy and Bangladesh U17.

He is the former head coach of the Bangladesh national team and guided them in the AFC Challenge Cup in Colombo, in early 2010. He is an AFC Pro-Diploma holder. He also represented the national team in early 90's. He also coached Bangladesh women's national team from 2023 to 2024, winning the 2024 SAFF U-19 Women's Championship during his tenure.

== Coaching career ==
=== Early career ===
He started his coaching career in April 2005 as interim head coach of Mohammedan SC alongside Mohammed Ponir, following the departure of Kang Man-young. He eventually served as the deputy to permanent head coach, Jasimuddin Ahmed Joshi in the same year. He was part of the Mohammedan coaching panel for four years. He also served as an assistant coach in the national team, and in 2010, he became the interim head coach of the Bangladesh national football team. From September 2010, he has again been an assistant coach in the national team, assisting Robert Rubčić. Then he again played the role of head coach of Mohammedan from 2012 to 2013. Later, he worked as the team instructor of the Bangladesh national team. In October 2014, he took temporary charge for the third time for the representation.

=== Sheikh Russel ===
In 2018, Titu joined Sheikh Russel KC ahead of 2018–19 season with a salary of Tk 50 lakhs, after finishing his interim spell at Dhaka Abahani.

On 13 March 2022, Titu was dismissed from the post of Sheikh Russel KC's head coach while his team was standing at relegation zone. It also marked the end to his longest spell as head coach of a club.

=== Chittagong Abahani ===
On 16 October 2022, Titu said that he had a verbal agreement with Chittagong Abahani to take charge as the club's head coach for coming season.

== Career statistics ==
=== International ===
Appearances and goals by national team and year
National team	Year	Apps	Goals
Bangladesh
Bangladesh	1989	3	0
Bangladesh	1990	2	0
Bangladesh	1991	3	0
Bangladesh	1992	1	0
Bangladesh	1993	1	0
Bangladesh	1994	1	0
Bangladesh	Total	11	0

== Managerial Statistics ==
As of 30 September 2024

Team	From	To	P	W	D	L	GS	GA	%W
Bangladesh	16 February 2010	20 February 2010	3	1	0	2	3	6	33.33
Bangladesh U23	16 June 2012	7 December 2012	9	3	0	6	4	16	33.33
Bangladesh	2 September 2012	20 November 2012	3	0	2	1	2	7	0.00
Bangladesh	18 October 2014	27 October 2014	2	1	1	0	2	1	50.00
Bangladesh U20	12 July 2015	6 October 2015	6	2	1	3	6	7	33.33
Sheikh Russel KC	June 2018	13 March 2022	84	40	17	27	115	87	47.62
Chittagong Abahani	9 November 2022	12 February 2023	15	3	5	7	14	23	20.00
Bangladesh U17	20 August 2024	1 November 2024	4	0	2	2	3	6	0.00
Bangladesh U23	23 July 2025	Present	0	0	0	0	0	0	—

P – Total of played matches W – Won matches D – Drawn matches L – Lost matches GS – Goal scored GA – Goals against
%W – Percentage of matches won

== Honours ==
=== Player ===
Mohammedan SC Ltd

- Dhaka Premier Division League: 1993

Muktijoddha Sangsad KC

- Dhaka Premier Division League: 1997–98
- Federation Cup: 1994
- Mahanagari Cup: 1997

=== Manager ===
Mohammedan SC Ltd

- Bangladesh Super Cup: 2011

Sheikh Jamal Dhanmondi Club

- Bangladesh Federation Cup: 2011–12
- Pokhara Cup: 2011

Bangladesh Women's U19

- SAFF U-19 Women's Championship: 2024
- SAFF U-16 Women's Championship: 2024
