= Khandoker Wasim Iqbal =

Bangladeshi footballer

Wasim Iqbal
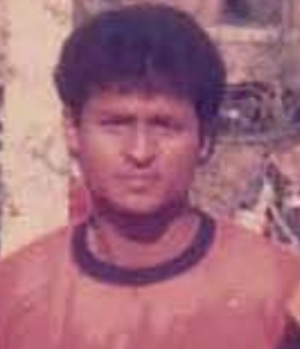
- Wasim with Brothers Union in 1987

Personal information
- Full name: Khandoker Wasim Iqbal
- Date of birth: 21 November 1961 (age 64)
- Place of birth: Dacca, East Pakistan (present-day Dhaka, Bangladesh)
- Height: 1.79 m (5 ft 10 1/2 in)
- Position: Right winger

Youth career
- 1978–1979: Brothers Union (Youth Team)

Senior career*
Years	Team	Apps	(Gls)
1979–1987	Brothers Union		
1987–1988	East Bengal		
1988–1990	Dhaka Abahani		
1990–1992	Brothers Union		

International career
1980	Bangladesh U19		
1982–1990	Bangladesh	47	(8)

Managerial career
- Brothers Union U19
- 2008–2011: Brothers Union
- 2013: Sheikh Jamal DC
- 2016: City United
- 2017: Little Friends Club
Medal record
Representing Bangladesh
South Asian Games
Silver medal – second place	1984
Silver medal – second place	1985
- * Club domestic league appearances and goals

Khandoker Wasim Iqbal (Bengali: খন্দকার ওয়াসিম ইকবাল; born 21 November 1961) is a retired Bangladeshi football player and coach. He mainly played as a right winger, and was one of the most recognised players during the early years of Bangladeshi football. He was a prominent member of the Bangladesh national team from 1982 to 1990.

== Club career ==
=== Brothers Union ===
Wasim's career began with his local club Brothers Union's youth team, with whom he took part in the Pioneer League. During his time with the youth team, Wasim managed to impress the club's captain Shahiduddin Ahmed Selim and was promoted to the senior team, within a year. Under the legendary Brothers coach Abdul Gafur Baloch, Wasim made his First Division League debut against Dhaka Wanderers. He started his career as a striker, but was soon converted to an out an out right winger in a 4-2-4 system and in his debut season of 1979, he scored in a 1–0 victory over Mohammedan. In 1984 he was named the club's captain.

Wasim's career with the Oranges saw him win the Federation Cup in 1980 and the Aga Khan Gold Cup in 1982. During Brothers' Aga Khan Gold Cup triumph in 1982, Wasim scored as the club routed the Oman national football team 3–1. He was a guest player during Mohammedan's Ashis-Jabbar Shield Tournament victory in India.

One of Wasim's most forgettable moments occurred during the 1985 First Division League deciding match against Abahani Krira Chakra. With Brothers needing a win to claim their first league title, they soon took a two-goal lead against their rivals. Furthermore, Wasim found himself in a one-on-one situation with Abahani's Sri Lankan goalkeeper, Chandrashir; however, his miss saw Abahani win the game 3–2, ending Wasim's hope for a first league title with his boyhood club.

=== East Bengal Club ===
In 1987, when Wasim was made the national team captain for the second time, he attracted interest from overseas and eventually joined Kolkata-based Indian giants, East Bengal Club. During his stint in India, he participated in both the Calcutta League and Rovers Cup. He won the Calcutta League title, before returning to Dhaka.

=== Dhaka Abahani ===
In 1988, Wasim joined Abahani Krira Chakra. He spent two years at the club winning the First Division in 1989 and also India's Sait Nagjee Trophy, with Wasim assisting Sheikh Mohammad Aslam's winning goal in the final. Wasim also represented Mohammedan as a guest player during the J.C. Guha Memorial Trophy in India, losing the final to Mohun Bagan AC. In 1990, he scored the only goal as Abahani defeated India's Mohun Bagan in the Azmiri Begum Gold Cup final in Feni.

=== Return to Brothers Union ===
In 1991, Wasim returned to Brothers Union, following an offer from club official, Sadeque Hossain Khoka. Following his return, the club won their first solo title, defeating Mohammedan on penalties in the 1991 Federation Cup final. Wasim was loaned to Dhaka Abahnai for the 1991–92 Asian Cup Winners' Cup. He also represented Brothers in the third round of the 1992–93 Asian Club Championship against Wohaib FC.

== International career ==
Wasim played for the Bangladesh U-19 team at the 1980 AFC Youth Championship and soon became a member for the Bangladesh national team, making his official debut during the 1982 Quaid-e-Azam International Tournament in Pakistan. Wasim regularly featured for the national team from 1982 to 1990, and captained the side at the 1984 South Asian Games in Nepal, and again at the 1987 South Asian Games in India. One of his most memorable matches for the national side came during the 1984 AFC Asian Cup qualifiers against the Philippines, when he almost single-handedly won the match for Bangladesh with his two goals in the first half.

On 8 March 1989, Wasim scored his last goal for the country, during what's considered to be one of Bangladesh's best ever performances in international football, thrashing Thailand 3–1 at the 1990 FIFA World Cup qualifiers. Before the start of the 1989 South Asian Games, coach Nasser Hejazi dropped many regular faces including Wasim. It was suspected that as Wasim played for Abahani Limited Dhaka at the time, the Mohammedan coach Hejazi did not want him in the team.

== Career statistics ==
=== International ===
Appearances and goals by national team and year
National team	Year	Apps	Goals
Bangladesh
Bangladesh	1982	7	1
Bangladesh	1983	4	0
Bangladesh	1984	9	4
Bangladesh	1985	12	2
Bangladesh	1986	3	0
Bangladesh	1987	3	0
Bangladesh	1988	4	0
Bangladesh	1989	5	1
Bangladesh	Total	47	8

Scores and results list Bangladesh's goal tally first.

List of international goals scored by Wasim Iqbal
No.	Date	Venue	Opponent	Score	Result	Competition
1.	18 February 1982	National Stadium, Karachi, Pakistan	Pakistan	1–1	1–2	1982 Quaid-e-Azam International Tournament
2.	13 August 1984	Sriwedari Stadium, Solo, Thailand	Philippines	1–0	3–2	1984 AFC Asian Cup qualification
3.	13 August 1984	Sriwedari Stadium, Solo, Thailand	Philippines	3–1	3–2	1984 AFC Asian Cup qualification
4.	21 September 1984	Dasharath Rangasala, Kathmandu, Nepal	Nepal		5–0	1984 South Asian Games
5.	21 September 1984	Dasharath Rangasala, Kathmandu, Nepal	Nepal		5–0	1984 South Asian Games
6.	23 December 1985	Dhaka Stadium, Dhaka, Bangladesh	Maldives	4–0	8–0	1985 South Asian Games
7.	23 December 1985	Dhaka Stadium, Dhaka, Bangladesh	Maldives	6–0	8–0	1985 South Asian Games
8.	8 March 1989	Dhaka Stadium, Dhaka, Bangladesh	Thailand	1–0	3–1	1990 FIFA World Cup qualification

== Style of play ==
Wasim dominated the domestic football scene in the 80s in the colors of Brothers Union with his deft dodges, speed, lethal crosses and stunning goals. He was mainly known for his dribbles and is considered to be the best dribbler of the ball Bangladesh ever produced.

== Managerial career ==
After retiring, Wasim started his coaching career with his former club Brothers Union's under 19 team and later went on to manage the senior team for three years. In 2013, he took charge of Sheikh Jamal DC for the Bangladesh Super Cup.

He later focused on grassroots, coaching with United City in the Third Division League and Little Friends Club in the Second Division League.

In October 2021, he became the general manager of Sheikh Russel KC in the Bangladesh Premier League.

In March 2022, Wasim was dismissed from the general manager post of Sheikh Russel KC.

== Personal life ==
Wasim studied in Ramakrishna Mission High School, which is where he learned how to play football, due to his father's persistence. During the peak of his career Wasim appeared in the movie Johnny Ustad, where he acted alongside film stars like Zafar Iqbal and Anju Ghosh.

== Honours ==
Brothers Union

- Federation Cup: 1980, 1991
- Aga Khan Gold Cup: 1981–82
- DMFA Cup: 1984

Mohammedan SC

- Ashis-Jabbar Shield Tournament (India): 1982

East Bengal Club

- Calcutta Football League: 1987

Abahani Limited Dhaka

- Federation Cup: 1988
- Sait Nagjee Trophy: 1989
- Dhaka First Division League: 1989–90
- Independence Cup: 1990
- Azmiri Begum Gold Cup: 1990

Bangladesh

- South Asian Games Silver medal: 1984, 1985

=== Awards and accolades ===
- 1985 − Sports Writers Association's Best Footballer Award.
- 2006 − National Sports Award.
