= 2016 Budha Subba Gold Cup =

Tournament details
- Host country: Nepal
- City: Dharan
- Dates: 27 February to 5 March 2016
- Teams: 10
- Venue(s): ANFA Technical Center Dharan

Final positions
- Champions: (Nepal) Manang Marshyangdi Club (3rd title)
- Runners-up: Nepal Police Club

Tournament statistics
- Matches played: 7
- Goals scored: 25 (3.57 per match)
- Top scorer(s): (Nigeria) Afeez Olawale (5 goals)
- Best player(s): (Nepal) Kiran Chemjong
- Best goalkeeper: (Nepal) Kiran Chemjong

The 2016 Budha Subba Gold Cup was the 18th edition of the Budha Subba Gold Cup held in Dharan and sponsored by Red Bull. Eight teams from Nepal, Bhutan and India participated in the tournament. All matches were held at the ANFA Technical Center Dharan.

== Teams ==
Team	City
Dharan F.C.	Dharan
Manang Marshyangdi Club	Kathmandu
APF Club	Kathmandu
Nepal Police Club	Kathmandu
Pokhara XI	Pokhara
Rupandehi FC	Rupandehi
Bhutan XI	Bhutan
Share FC	Kalimpong, India

== Bracket ==
The following is the bracket which the 2016 Budha Subba Gold Cup resembled. Numbers in parentheses next to the match score represent the results of a penalty shoot-out.

Quarterfinals
Manang Marshyangdi Club	8
Bhutan XI	0
Pokhara XI	1 (5)
APF Club	1 (4)
Dharan F.C.	1
Rupandehi FC	4
Share FC	0
Nepal Police Club	3

Semifinals
Manang Marshyangdi Club	3
APF Club	2
Rupandehi FC	0
Nepal Police Club	1

Final
Manang Marshyangdi Club	1
Nepal Police Club	0

== Awards and Prize Money ==
- Prize Money for winning team: NPRs 400,000 (Manang Marshyangdi Club)
- Prize Money for runners-up: NPRs 250,000 (Nepal Police Club)
- Best Player of the Tournament Award: Kiran Chemjong (Manang Marshyangdi Club) Prize: Yamaha Motorcycle
- Highest Goal Scorer Award: Afeez Olawale (Manang Marshyangdi Club) NPRs 25,000
- Best Coach Award: Tshring Lopsang (Manang Marshyangdi Club) Prize money: NPRs 11,000
- Best Striker of the Tournament Award: Anil Gurung (Manang Marshyangdi Club) Prize money: NPRs 11,000
- Best Midfielder of the Tournament Award: Heman Gurung (Manang Marshyangdi Club) Prize money: NPRs 11,000
- Best Defender of the Tournament Award: Suraj BK (Nepal Police Club) Prize money: NPRs 11,000
- Best Goalkeeper of the Tournament Award: Kiran Chemjong (Manang Marshyangdi Club) Prize money: NPRs 11,000
