= Amobi =

Amobi is both a given name and a surname. Notable people with the name include:

- Amobi Ogah, Nigerian politician
- Amobi Okoye (born 1987), Nigerian player of American football
- Amobi Okugo (born 1991), American soccer player
- Chino Amobi (born 1984), American artist
- Victor Amobi (born 1990), Nigerian footballer
