= Simara Gold Cup =

Jeetpursimara Gold Cup
- Founded: 2010
- Region: Simara, Nepal
- Number of teams: 12
- Current champions: Sankata Club
- Most successful club(s): Nepal Army Club (2 titles)
- Television broadcasters: Kantipur TV

Jeetpursimara Gold Cup is a football knockout tournament held in Simara, Nepal. Founded in 2010, the tournament is organised by Simara FC (formerly known as Nawa Jan Jagriti Yuwa Club). Currently, the 12-team tournament is sponsored by Vishwokarma Cement.

== Editions ==
Edition	Year (B.S.)	Year (A.D.)	Winners	Runners-up
1st	2066	2010	Majdur Sahid Smirti Club	Gorkha Boys Sports Club (Butwal)
2nd	2067	2011	Himalayan Sherpa Club	APF Club
3rd	2068	2012	Manang Marshyangdi Club	Sahara Club (Pokhara)
4th	2069	2013	Manang Marshyangdi Club	Himalayan Sherpa Club
5th	2070	2014	Nawa Jana Jagriti Yuwa Club	Birgunj United
6th	2071	2015	Nepal Army Club	Nepal Police Club
7th	2072	2016	Bijay Youth Club	Rupandehi XI
8th	2073	2017	Sankata Club	Nepal Army Club
9th	2074	2018	Nepal Army Club	Three Star Club
10th	2075	2019	Three Star Club	Nepal Army Club
11th	2078	2021	Sankata Club	(Cameroon) ARAS
12th	2078	2022	New Road Team	APF F.C.
13th	2079	2023	Church Boys United	Himalayan Sherpa Club
14th	2081	2024	Nepal Police	Machhindra F.C.

== Top performing clubs ==
Club	Winners	Runners-up
Nepal Army Club	2	2
Manang Marshyangdi Club	2	0
Himalayan Sherpa Club	1	1
Three Star Club	1	
Majdur Sahid Smirti Club	1	0
Bijay Youth Club	1	0
Nawa Jana Jagriti Yuwa Club	1	0
Sankata Club	2	0
APF Club	0	1
Birgunj United	0	1
Gorkha Boys Sports Club (Butwal)	0	1
Nepal Police Club	0	1
Rupandehi XI	0	1
Sahara Club (Pokhara)	0	1
ARAS, Cameroon	0	1

== See also ==
- Birat Gold Cup
- Aaha! Gold Cup
- KP Oli Cup
- Pokhara Cup
- Budha Subba Gold Cup
- Jhapa Gold Cup
- Tribhuvan Challenge Shield
- ANFA Cup
