= Pokhara Cup =

Manakamana Cable Car Pokhara Cup
- Founded: 2011; 15 years ago
- Abolished: 2017
- Region: Kaski District, Nepal
- Teams: 12
- Last champions: Dauphins Family Club of Cameroon
- Most championships: (Nepal) Manang Marsyangdi Club (3 titles)

The Pokhara Cup was an international football tournament held in Pokhara, Nepal, organized by the ANFA Kaski. For sponsorship reasons it was known as the Safal Pokhara Cup and the Manakamana Cable Car Pokhara Cup.

== History ==
The tournament was formed as the Pokhara Gold Cup in 2011. The final edition took place in 2019, it has not been hosted since.

== Venue ==
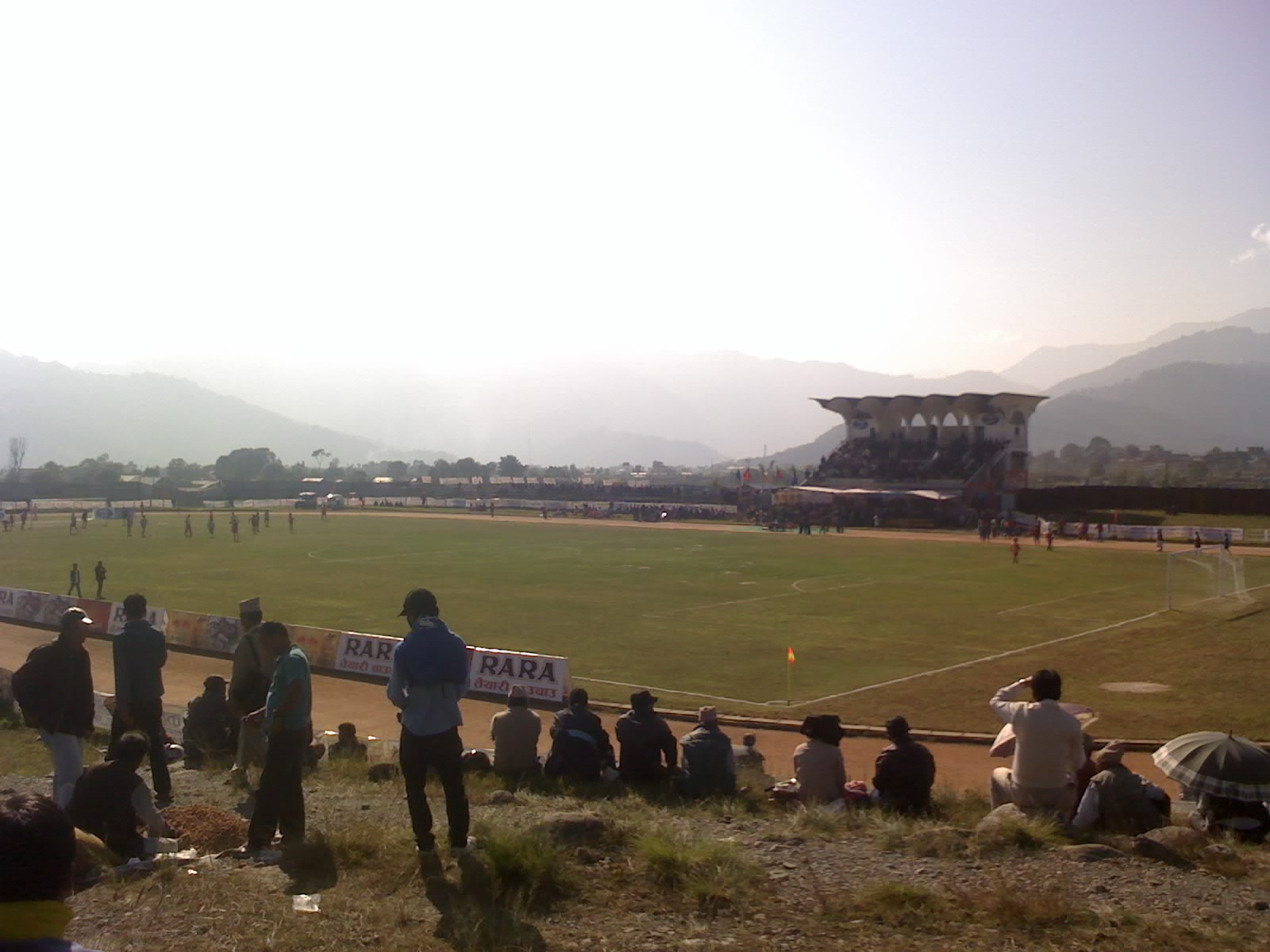
Pokhara Rangasala during the first Pokhara Cup in 2011

The Pokhara Cup is held at the Pokhara Rangasala, a multipurpose sports venue that is frequently used for football.

| Pokhara | Pokhara Cup is located in Nepal |
| Pokhara Rangasala | Pokhara Cup is located in Nepal |
| Capacity: 18,500 | Pokhara Cup is located in Nepal |

== Previous champions ==
| Edition | Year (B.S.)* | Year (A.D.)** | Champion | Runners-up |
|---|---|---|---|---|
| I | 2068 | 2011 | (Bangladesh) Sheikh Jamal Dhanmondi Club | Nepal Army Club |
| II | 2069 | 2012 | (Nepal) Manang Marsyangdi Club | (Nepal) Machhindra Football Club |
| III | 2070 | 2013 | (Nepal) Manang Marsyangdi Club | (Nepal) Three Star Club |
| IV | 2071 | 2015 | Nepal Police Club | (Nepal) Three Star Club |
| IV | 2072 | 2016 | (Nepal) Manang Marshyangdi Club | Nepal Army Club |
| V | Not held | | | |
| VI | 2075 | 2019 | (Cameroon) Dauphins Family Club of Caemeroon | (Nepal) APF Club |

*Denotes Nepali calendar date
**Denotes Gregorian calendar date

== Most successful clubs ==
| Club | Champions | Runners-up |
|---|---|---|
| (Nepal) Manang Marshyangdi Club | 3 | 0 |
| Nepal Police Club | 1 | 0 |
| (Bangladesh) Sheikh Jamal Dhanmondi Club | 1 | 0 |
| (Cameroon) Dauphins Family Club | 1 | 0 |
| Nepal Army Club | 0 | 2 |
| (Nepal) Three Star Club | 0 | 2 |
| (Nepal) Machhindra Football Club | 0 | 1 |
| (Nepal) APF Club | 0 | 1 |

== See also ==
- Aaha! Gold Cup
- Simara Gold Cup
- Budha Subba Gold Cup
- Jhapa Gold Cup
- KP Oli Cup
- Tribhuvan Challenge Shield
- ANFA Cup
