= Nurul Haque Manik =

Bangladeshi footballer (died 2020)

Personal information
- Full name: Mohammad Nurul Haque Manik
- Date of birth: 25 June 1964
- Place of birth: Chandpur, East Pakistan
- Date of death: 14 June 2020 (aged 55)
- Place of death: Dhaka, Bangladesh
- Position: Attacking midfielder

Youth career
- 1980: Kamalapur JKS
- 1981: Pragati Sangha

Senior career*
Years	Team	Apps	(Gls)
1983	Fakirerpool YMC		
1984	Lalbagh SC		
1985–1987	Arambagh KS		
1988–1989	Fakirerpool YMC		
1989–1991	Brothers Union		
1991	Kolkata Mohammedan		
1991–1992	Brothers Union		
1993–1998	Dhaka Mohammedan		

International career
1989–1997	Bangladesh	19	(1)

Managerial career
- 2011: Bangladesh U16
Medal record
Representing Bangladesh
South Asian Games
Silver medal – second place	1989
Bronze medal – third place	1991
Silver medal – second place	1995
- * Club domestic league appearances and goals

Nurul Haque Manik (25 June 1964 – 14 June 2020) was a Bangladeshi footballer who played as an attacking midfielder. He was a prominent figure in the Bangladesh national team between 1989 and 1997. He spent most of his club career playing for domestic giants Mohammedan Sporting Club and Brothers Union.

== Early life ==
Mohammad Nurul Haque Manik was born in Matlab Uttar Upazila, Chandpur, Bangladesh and spent his childhood there. His father, AKM Mozammel Haque, was an accountant in the Public Works Department. Manik moved to Dhaka with his family due to his father's job and it was through him that Manik became involved with football. In 1980, he played in the Pioneer Football League with Kamalapur Jubo KS and the following year with Pragati Sangha. In 1983, he played in the Dhaka Second Division League with Fakirerpool YMC.

== Club career ==
Manik made his top-tier debut with First Division club Arambagh KS in 1985. He spent two years with the club and was named as their captain in 1987, which ended up being his last season there. He joined Fakirerpool YMC in 1988 and was named their captain the same year. Manik went on to sign a contract with Brothers Union, and captained the Oranges to the 1991 Federation Cup trophy. In the same year he joined Kolkata Mohammedan in the Calcutta Football League. Manik ended his career with the Dhaka based Mohammedan Sporting Club in 1998; and also captained the side in 1995. He also played for Abahani Limited Dhaka as a guest player when they faced India's East Bengal Club in the 1991–92 Asian Cup Winners' Cup.

== International career ==
In 1989, Manik played for the Bangladesh Green Team (B team) at the President's Gold Cup. His greatest moment with the senior national team came during the 1989 South Asian Games, when Manik scored the opening goal of the match against India and helped his country earn a place in the finals, however, the game ended in huge controversy, when Bangladesh captain Elias Hossain was suspended from playing international games after getting into a fight with the referee. Manik last played for the national team on 5 September 1997, when Bangladesh tied 1–1 with Maldives at the Dasharath Rangasala Stadium in Kathmandu, Nepal, during the 1997 SAFF Gold Cup.

== Personal life ==
After his retirement Manik started his coaching career under Bangladesh Football Federation (BFF).

On 14 June 2020, at the age of 55, Manik died in Dhaka, Bangladesh, after being infected with COVID-19.

== Career statistics ==
=== International ===
Appearances and goals by national team and year
National team	Year	Apps	Goals
Bangladesh
Bangladesh	1989	3	1
Bangladesh	1991	1	0
Bangladesh	1995	7	0
Bangladesh	1997	8	0
Total		19	1

Scores and results list Bangladesh's goal tally first.

List of international goals scored by Nurul Haque Manik
No.	Date	Venue	Opponent	Score	Result	Competition
1	23 October 1989	Jinnah Sports Stadium, Islamabad, Pakistan	India	1–0	1–1	1989 South Asian Games

== Honours ==
Fakirerpool YMC

- Dhaka Second Division League: 1987

Brothers Union

- Federation Cup: 1991

Dhaka Mohammedan

- Dhaka Premier Division League: 1993, 1996
- Federation Cup: 1995
- DMFA Cup: 1993, 1995

Bangladesh

- South Asian Games Silver medal: 1989, 1995; Bronze medal: 1991
