= 2017 Ruslan Simara Gold Cup =

Tournament details
- Host country: Nepal
- City: Simara, Nepal
- Dates: 2 February to 11 February 2017
- Teams: 10
- Venue: Simara Stadium

Final positions
- Champions: Sankata FC (1st title)
- Runners-up: Nepal Army Club

Tournament statistics
- Matches played: 9
- Goals scored: 17 (1.89 per match)
- Top scorer: (Nepal) Bal Krishna Shrestha (2 goals)
- Best player: (Nepal) Binaya Shrestha

The 2017 Ruslan Simara Gold Cup was the eighth tournament of the Simara Gold Cup, an annual football knockout tournament held in Simara, Nepal. In total, ten teams participated in this tournament.

Sankata FC defeated Nepal Army Club 4-2 on penalties in the final to claim their first title in this tournament.

== Teams ==
Five top Nepali A Level football teams and five top cities football teams participants in this football tournament.

Team	City
APF Club	Kathmandu
Bijay Youth Club	Hetauda
Birganj United	Birganj
Himalayan Sherpa Club	Kathmandu
Nawa Jana Jagriti Yuwa Club	Baglung
Nepal Army Club	Kathmandu
Rupandehi FC	Rupandehi
Sahara Club	Pokhara
Sankata FC	Kathmandu
Saraswati Youth Club	Kathmandu

== Bracket ==
The following is the bracket which the 2017 Ruslan Simara Gold Cup resembled. Numbers in parentheses next to the match score represent the results of a penalty shoot-out.

Qualification games
Nawa Jana Jagriti Yuwa Club	0
Saraswati Youth Club	2
Birgunj United	1
Sahara Club	0

Quarter-finals
Saraswati Youth Club	0
Bijay Youth Club	1
Sankata FC	2
APF Club	0
Himalayan Sherpa	1
Rupandehi FC	0
Birganj United	0
Nepal Army Club	3

Semifinals
Bijay Youth Club	1
Sankata FC	2
Nepal Army Club	2
Himalayan Sherpa	1

Final
Sankata FC	4 (a.e.t.)
Nepal Army Club	2

== Awards ==
Award	Recipient	Recipient's Team	Reward
Prize Money for winning team		Sankata FC	NPRs 551,000
Prize Money for runners-up		Nepal Army Club	NPRs 251,000
Best Player of the Tournament Award	Binaya Shrestha	Sankata FC	NPRs 15,000
Highest Goal Scorer Award	Bal Krishna Shrestha	Nepal Army Club	NPRs 15,000
Best Coach Award	Salyan Khadgi	Sankata FC	NPRs 15,000
Best Striker of the Tournament	Anil Gurung	Sankata FC	NPRs 15,000
Best Midfielder of the Tournament	Santosh Tamang	Nepal Army Club	NPRs 15,000
Best Defender of the Tournament	Bimal Pandey	Nepal Army Club	NPRs 15,000
Best Goalkeeper of the Tournament	Binaya Shrestha	Sankata FC	NPRs 15,000
