= Mohammed Ponir =

Bangladeshi footballer

Personal information
- Full name: Mohammed Poniruzzaman Ponir
- Date of birth: 7 August 1969 (age 57)
- Place of birth: Dhaka, East Pakistan (present-day Bangladesh)
- Height: 1.70 m (5 ft 7 in)
- Position: Goalkeeper

Senior career*
Years	Team	Apps	(Gls)
1980–1984	Lalbagh SC		
1985–1987	Sadharan Bima		
1988–1990	Fakirerpool		
1991–1994	Brothers Union		
1991	Kolkata Mohammedan		
1995–2000	Dhaka Mohammedan		

International career
1991–1999	Bangladesh	13	(0)

Managerial career
- 2005: Dhaka Mohammedan (interim)
- 2010: Dhaka Mohammedan (interim)
- 2010: Bangladesh U23 (goalkeeper coach)
- 2016–2024: Chittagong Abahani (goalkeeper coach)
Medal record
Representing Bangladesh
South Asian Games
Bronze medal – third place	1991 Colombo
Silver medal – second place	1995 Madras
Gold medal – first place	1999 Kathmandu
- * Club domestic league appearances and goals

Mohammed Poniruzzaman Ponir (Bengali: মোহাম্মদ পনিরুজ্জামান পনির; born 7 August 1969), known simply as Ponir, is a retired Bangladeshi football player and coach.

== Club career ==
Ponir represented Lalbagh SC from 1980 to 1984, during which the club won the Third Division in 1981. He debuted in the First Division with Sadharan Bima CSC in 1985. Ponir's performances with Fakirerpool YMC from 1988 to 1990 earned him a move to Brothers Union prior to the 1991 BTC Club Cup. Following the tournament, he was recruited by Kolkata Mohammedan and represented the team in the Calcutta First Division League in 1991, before returning to Brothers Union. In 1995, Ponir joined Dhaka Mohammedan and represented the club until his retirement in 2000. He also captained the team in the 1997–98 season. In his final year, he also represented the club in the 2000 National League.

== International career ==
Ponir represented the Bangladesh national team from 1991 to 1999. He was also part of the team that won gold at the 1999 South Asian Games in Kathmandu, Nepal.

== Coaching career ==
He began his coaching career in 2005, serving as the joint interim coach of Dhaka Mohammedan alongside Saiful Bari Titu. Following Mohammedan head coach Maruful Haque's departure on 13 May 2010, during the 2008–09 B.League, Ponir again served as interim head coach until their final league match on 2 June. He was the goalkeeper coach of the Bangladesh U23 team at the 2010 South Asian Games in Dhaka. He also served as the goalkeeper coach of Chittagong Abahani.

== Career statistics ==
=== International ===
Appearances and goals by national team and year
National team	Year	Apps	Goals
Bangladesh
Bangladesh	1995	9	0
Bangladesh	1997	3	0
Bangladesh	1999	1	0
Bangladesh	Total	13	0

== Honours ==
Lalbagh SC

- Dhaka Third Division League: 1981

Brothers Union

- Federation Cup: 1991

Dhaka Mohammedan

- Dhaka Premier Division League: 1996, 1999
- All Airlines Gold Cup: 1999
- Federation Cup: 1995
- DMFA Cup: 1995

Bangladesh

- South Asian Games Gold medal: 1999; Silver medal: 1995; Bronze medal: 1991

Individual

- 1993 − Sports Writers Association's Best Footballer Award.
