= Haji Abdul Sattar (footballer) =

Pakistani footballer (born 1965)

Abdul Sattar
Personal information
- Full name: Haji Abdul Sattar
- Date of birth: 6 February 1965 (age 61)
- Place of birth: Faisalabad, Pakistan
- Position: Defender

Senior career*
Years	Team	Apps	(Gls)
1982–2002	Pakistan Army		

International career
1989–1990	Pakistan		(1)
- * Club domestic league appearances and goals

Haji Abdul Sattar (born 6 February 1965) is a former Pakistani footballer who played as a defender for Pakistan Army F.C. as well as the Pakistan national team. Sattar was the author of the lone goal in the final against Bangladesh at the 1989 South Asian Games, which saw Pakistan win their first title at the tournament.

== Club career ==
In 1985, Sattar featured in the National Youth Football Championship. He represented Pakistan Army at the domestic National Football Championship. He also played for WAPDA and Pakistan Steel.

== International career ==
He made his international debut in the 1989 South Asian Games in Islamabad under the captainship of Mateen Akhtar. Sattar was the author of the lone goal in the final. Scoring from an assist from Zulfiqar Hussain Dogar against Bangladesh at the 1989 South Asian Games in the dying minutes of the game. Which saw Pakistan win their first title at the tournament. He came as a substitute for starting player Shaukat Ali in the match.

Sattar also competed with Pakistan at the 1990 Asian Games held in Beijing.

== Coaching career ==
Sattar finished an AFC Professional Coaching Diploma and coached several clubs later on.

In 2010, he conducted trials for Islamabad United team for the franchise based Super Football League. In 2014 and 2015, he worked as the coach of the Higher Education Commission tam in the PFF League and the National Challenge Cup.

In 2016, he was named coach of a combined team of the Islamabad Football Association. He coached SA Farms at the 2020 PFF National Challenge Cup.

== Career statistics ==
=== International goals ===
Scores and results list Pakistan's goal tally first, score column indicates score after each Sattar goal.

List of international goals scored by Haji Abdul Sattar
No.	Date	Venue	Opponent	Score	Result	Competition
1	26 October 1989	Jinnah Stadium, Islamabad, Pakistan	Bangladesh	1–0	1–0	1989 South Asian Games

== Honours ==
=== Pakistan ===
- South Asian Games: 1989
