= Gendaria Thana =

Thana in Dhaka South City Corporation, Bangladesh

Gendaria Thana গেন্ডারিয়া থানা
- Thana
- Interactive map of Gendaria Thana
- Country: Bangladesh
- Division: Dhaka Division
- District: Dhaka District

Area
  - Total: 1.83 km^{2} (0.71 sq mi)
- Elevation: 23 m (75 ft)

Population (2022)
  - Total: 140,291
  - Density: 75,257/km^{2} (194,910/sq mi)
- Time zone: UTC+6 (BST)
- Postal code: 1204
- Area code: 02

Gandaria (Bengali: গেন্ডারিয়া) is a Thana of Dhaka District in the Division of Dhaka, Bangladesh. Its area is 1.83 square kilometres (0.71 sq mi). The name is a portmanteau of original name Grand Area, still found in deeds prior to 1950s.

== Demographics ==
Religions in Gendaria Thana (2022)
Religion	Percent
Islam	88.78%
Hinduism	10.91%
Other or not stated	0.31%

According to the 2022 Bangladeshi census, Gendaria Thana had 35,225 households and a population of 140,307. 6.64% of the population were under 5 years of age. Gendaria had a literacy rate (age 7 and over) of 88.56%: 90.02% for males and 86.83% for females, and a sex ratio of 117.66 males for every 100 females.

According to the 2011 Census of Bangladesh, Gendaria Thana had 27,887 households with average household size of 4.48 and a population of 137,721. Males constituted 55.51% (76,446) of the population while females 44.49% (61,275). Gendaria Thana had a literacy rate (age 7 and over) of 75.6%, compared to the national average of 51.8%, and a sex ratio of 125.There were 585 floating people in this jurisdiction.

The religious breakdown was Muslim 89.71% (123,550), Hindu 9.96% (13,719), Christian 0.31% (428), Buddhist 0.01% (20), and others 0.00% (4). The ethnic minority people living there were 110 persons in total.

== Educational institutions ==
The only college in the upazila is Fazlul Hoq Mohila College, an honors level one.

According to Banglapedia, Bangladesh Bank Ideal High School, Gandaria High School, Moniza Rahman Girls' High School, and Narinda Government High School are notable secondary schools.

The madrasa education system includes one fazil and one kamil madrasa.

== See also ==
- Upazilas of Bangladesh
- Districts of Bangladesh
- Divisions of Bangladesh
