= Mostakim Wazed =

Bangladeshi footballer

Personal information
- Full name: Mostakim Wazed
- Date of birth: 1 March 1965 (age 61)
- Place of birth: Rajshahi, Bangladesh
- Positions: Attacking midfielder; striker

Senior career*
Years	Team	Apps	(Gls)
1982–1986	Muktijoddha Sangsad		
1987	Arambagh KS		
1988–1989	Rahmatganj MFS		
1989–1991	Mohammedan		
1991–1993	Dhaka Wanderers		
1994–1996	Rahmatganj MFS		

International career
1989	Bangladesh	2	(0)
Medal record
Representing Bangladesh
South Asian Games
Silver medal – second place	1989 Islamabad
- * Club domestic league appearances and goals

Mostakim Wazed (Bengali: মোস্তাকিম ওয়াজেদ; born 1 March 1965) is a retired Bangladeshi professional footballer who played as an attacking midfielder. He represented the Bangladesh national team in 1989.

== Club career ==
Mostakim came into the limelight by scoring a brace in the 1989/90 Federation Cup final for Mohammedan SC in the Dhaka derby against Dhaka Abahani. The Black and Whites were initially trailing due to a penalty goal from Rizvi Karim Rumi, but Mostakim eventually equalized in the dying minutes of normal time. He then went on to score the winning goal in the 113th minute of extra time at the Mirpur Stadium.

== International career ==
Mostakim was a member of the Bangladesh national team, the Bangladesh Red team, at the 1989 Bangladesh President's Gold Cup, and helped the team win the tournament. He was also part of the national squad during the 1989 South Asian Games in Islamabad, Pakistan. During the tournament he appeared against both Pakistan and Sri Lanka as Bangladesh finished runners-up.

== Career statistics ==
=== International apps ===
Appearances and goals by national team and year
National team	Year	Apps	Goals
Bangladesh	1989	2	0
Total		2	0

== Honours ==
Mohammedan SC

- Federation Cup: 1989
- Ma-O-Moni Gold Cup: 1990

Muktijoddha Sangsad KC

- Dhaka Second Division League: 1983

Bangladesh

- South Asian Games Silver medal: 1989
