= 2018 Budha Subba Gold Cup =

Tournament details
- Host country: Nepal
- Dates: 2074 BS
- Venue(s): 1 (in 1 host city)

Final positions
- Champions: Three Star Club
- Runners-up: Nepal Police Club

2018 Budha Subba Gold Cup (Nepali: बुढासुब्बा गोल्डकप २०७५) was the 20th session of football tournament Budha Subba Gold Cup. Three Star Club won the tournament against Nepal Police Club in the final.

== Matches ==
=== Semi-final ===
2074 Magh 24

Nepal Police Club	2-1	(Nepal) Sankata Club

Dharan Stadium

2 074 Magh 24

(India) Durgaputlr Stil Football Club	2-1	(Nepal) Three Star Club

Dharan Stadium

=== Final ===
2074 Magh 27

Nepal Police Club	0-1	(Nepal) Three Star Club
		Ajai Martin (53)

Dharan Stadium
