= Mother Dairy =

Indian public sector dairy company

- Type: Subsidiary of National Dairy Development Board
- Industry: Dairy
- Founded: 1974; 52 years ago
- Headquarters: Sector-1, Noida, Uttar Pradesh, India
- Key people: Manish Bandlish (Managing Director)
- Products: Milk; Dairy products
- Revenue: Over ₹17,000 crore
- Owner: National Dairy Development Board
- Website: www.motherdairy.com

Mother Dairy is an Indian public sector dairy company that manufactures, markets and sells milk and dairy products. It is a wholly owned subsidiary of the National Dairy Development Board (NDDB), which is a statutory body administered by the Ministry of Fisheries, Animal Husbandry and Dairying of the Government of India. Mother Dairy was founded in 1974, as a subsidiary of the NDDB.

Mother Dairy supplies its products primarily in Delhi NCR, which accounted for over 65% of its sales in 2025. The company also owns Safal retail chain and Dhara edible oil brand.

== History ==
Mother Dairy was commissioned in 1974 as a wholly owned subsidiary of the National Dairy Development Board (NDDB), under 'Operation Flood'. It was an initiative under Operation Flood, a dairy development program aimed at making India a milk sufficient nation. Mother Dairy sources a significant part of its requirement of liquid milk from dairy cooperatives and village level farmer centric organizations.

In July 2020, Mother Dairy started making breads.

In January 2021, the company launched packaged food products under its Safal brand, sourced from tribals of Jharkhand.

== Brands and subsidiaries ==
The company sells milk and milk products under the "Mother Dairy" brand. Mother Dairy also sells packaged sweets.

Safal is the retail arm of Mother Dairy. It operates a large number of milk and milk product stores in the Delhi NCR, and also has a significant presence in Bengaluru. Safal also has a plant in Bengaluru, which produces aseptic fruit pulp and concentrates. It supplies milk and milk products to food processing companies such as Coca-Cola, Pepsi, Hindustan Unilever, and Nestlé India. Safal also has a presence across 40 countries viz., US, Europe, Middle East, Asia and Africa and exports fresh fruits and vegetables (grapes, banana, gherkin, onion, etc.), fruit pulp & concentrate, frozen fruits & vegetables.

In January 2020, Mother Dairy opened its first restaurant 'Café Delights' in Noida.

== Revenue ==
As of 2026, Mother Dairy had a revenue over ₹17,000 crore.
