= 1988–89 Asian Club Championship =

8th edition of premier club football tournament organized by the AFC

1988–1989 Asian Club Championship
Tournament details
- Dates: 25 March 1988 – 8 April 1989
- Teams: 26

Final positions
- Champions: (Qatar) Al-Sadd (1st title)
- Runners-up: (Iraq) Al-Rasheed

Tournament statistics
- Matches played: 63
- Goals scored: 218 (3.46 per match)

The 1988–89 Asian Club Championship was the 8th edition of the annual Asian club football competition hosted by Asian Football Confederation.

Al-Sadd of Qatar won the final and became Asian champions for the first time.

== Qualifying Group round ==
=== Group 1 ===
Pos	Team	Pld	W	D	L	GF	GA	GD	Pts	Qualification
1	(Iraq) Al-Rasheed	3	2	1	0	9	0	+9	5	Qualify to Semi-finals
2	(Qatar) Al-Sadd (H)	3	2	1	0	5	1	+4	5	Qualify to Semi-finals
3	(Syria) Al-Futowa	3	1	0	2	2	7	−5	2	
4	(Lebanon) Al-Ansar	3	0	0	3	0	8	−8	0	

Source: RSSSF
(H) Hosts

All matches were played in Doha, Qatar.

24 July 1988

Al-Sadd (Qatar)	4–1	(Syria) Al-Futowa

Sheikh Al-Saani Stadium, Doha, Qatar

25 July 1988

Al-Rasheed (Iraq)	6–0	(Lebanon) Al-Ansar

Sheikh Al-Saani Stadium, Doha, Qatar

27 July 1988

Al-Sadd (Qatar)	1–0	(Lebanon) Al-Ansar

Sheikh Al-Saani Stadium, Doha, Qatar

28 July 1988

Al-Rasheed (Iraq)	3–0	(Syria) Al-Futowa

Sheikh Al-Saani Stadium, Doha, Qatar

30 July 1988

Al-Futowa (Syria)	1–0	(Lebanon) Al-Ansar

Sheikh Al-Saani Stadium, Doha, Qatar

31 July 1988

Al-Rasheed (Iraq)	0–0	(Qatar) Al-Sadd

Sheikh Al-Saani Stadium, Doha, Qatar

=== Group 2 ===
Pos	Team	Pld	W	D	L	GF	GA	GD	Pts	Qualification
1	(Saudi Arabia) Al-Ettifaq	4	3	1	0	6	2	+4	7	Qualify to Semi-finals
2	(Kuwait) Kazma SC	4	3	1	0	9	2	+7	7	Qualify to Semi-finals
3	(United Arab Emirates) Sharjah FC (H)	4	2	0	2	6	5	+1	4	
4	(Oman) Fanja^{1}	4	1	0	3	3	8	−5	2	
5	(Bahrain) West Riffa	4	0	0	4	1	8	−7	0	

Source: RSSSF
(H) Hosts

^{1} Fanja played only in the GCC Tournament.

=== Group 3 ===
Pos	Team	Pld	W	D	L	GF	GA	GD	Pts	Qualification
1	(India) Mohun Bagan (H)	3	3	0	0	13	2	+11	6	Qualify to Semi-finals
2	(Oman) Fanja	3	2	0	1	13	3	+10	4	
3	(Pakistan) Crescent Textile Mills	3	1	0	2	3	17	−14	2	
4	(Nepal) Kathmandu SC	3	0	0	3	4	11	−7	0	

Source: RSSSF
(H) Hosts

All matches were played at the Salt Lake Stadium in Calcutta, India.

2 July 1988

Mohun Bagan (India)	8–0	(Pakistan) Crescent Textile Mills
Chatterjee; Mukherjee; Mani; Banerjee; Ghosh

Salt Lake Stadium, Kolkata, India

3 July 1988

Fanja (Oman)	5–1	(Nepal) Kathmandu SC

Salt Lake Stadium, Kolkata, India

5 July 1988

Mohun Bagan (India)	4–2	(Nepal) Kathmandu SC
Sisir Ghosh; Babu Mani; Prasanta Banerjee		Ganesh Thapa

Salt Lake Stadium, Kolkata, India

6 July 1988

Fanja (Oman)	8–1	(Pakistan) Crescent Textile Mills

Salt Lake Stadium, Kolkata, India

8 July 1988

Crescent Textile Mills (Pakistan)	2–1	(Nepal) Kathmandu SC

Salt Lake Stadium, Kolkata, India

9 July 1988

Mohun Bagan (India)	1–0	(Oman) Fanja
Sudip Chatterjee

Salt Lake Stadium, Kolkata, India

=== Group 4 ===
Pos	Team	Pld	W	D	L	GF	GA	GD	Pts	Qualification
1	(Bangladesh) Mohammedan SC (H)	2	1	1	0	2	1	+1	3	Qualify to Semi-finals
2	(Iran) Persepolis	2	1	0	1	6	2	+4	2	
3	(Sri Lanka) Saunders SC	2	0	1	1	0	5	−5	1	

Source: RSSSF
(H) Hosts

All match were played in Dhaka, Bangladesh.

14 June 1988

Mohammedan SC (Bangladesh)	0–0	(Sri Lanka) Saunders SC

Mirpur Stadium, Bangladesh
Referee: Soum Shreshta (Nepal)

16 June 1988

Persepolis (Iran)	5–0	(Sri Lanka) Saunders SC
Pious 7', 42'; Ansarifard 33' (?); Zia 66'

Mirpur Stadium, Bangladesh
Referee: Gopal Joshi (Nepal)

18 June 1988

Mohammedan SC (Bangladesh)	2–1	(Iran) Persepolis
Taheri 56'; Salahuddin 80'		Morteza 48'

Mirpur Stadium, Bangladesh
Referee: Soum Shreshta (Nepal)

=== Group 5 ===
Pos	Team	Pld	W	D	L	GF	GA	GD	Pts	Qualification
1	(Thailand) Royal Thai Air Force (H)	4	4	0	0	22	2	+20	8	Qualify to Semi-finals
2	(Malaysia) Pahang FA	4	2	1	1	8	4	+4	5	Qualify to Semi-finals
3	(Indonesia) Niac Mitra	4	1	2	1	5	4	+1	4	
4	(Singapore) Geylang International	4	1	1	2	5	13	−8	3	
5	(Brunei) Bandaran KB	4	0	0	4	3	20	−17	0	

Source: RSSSF
(H) Hosts

All match were played in Bangkok, Thailand.

21 July 1988

Royal Thai Air Force (Thailand)	2–1	(Malaysia) Pahang FA

21 July 1988

Niac Mitra (Indonesia)	3–1	(Brunei) Bandaran KB

23 July 1988

Royal Thai Air Force (Thailand)	9–0	(Singapore) Geylang International
Piyapong

23 July 1988

Pahang FA (Malaysia)	0–0	(Indonesia) Niac Mitra

25 July 1988

Royal Thai Air Force (Thailand)	2–1	(Indonesia) Niac Mitra

25 July 1988

Geylang International (Singapore)	3–1	(Brunei) Bandaran KB

27 July 1988

Niac Mitra (Indonesia)	1–1	(Singapore) Geylang International

27 July 1988

Pahang FA (Malaysia)	5–1	(Brunei) Bandaran KB

29 July 1988

Royal Thai Air Force (Thailand)	9–0	(Brunei) Bandaran KB

29 July 1988

Pahang FA (Malaysia)	2–1	(Singapore) Geylang International

=== Group 6 ===
Pos	Team	Pld	W	D	L	GF	GA	GD	Pts	Qualification
1	(North Korea) April 25	4	4	0	0	11	1	+10	8	Qualify to Semi-finals
2	(China) Guangdong Wanbao (H)	4	3	0	1	11	3	+8	6	Qualify to Semi-finals
3	(Japan) Yamaha Motors	4	1	1	2	12	9	+3	3	
4	(Hong Kong) South China	4	1	1	2	4	5	−1	3	
5	(Macau) Wa Seng	4	0	0	4	3	23	−20	0	

Source: RSSSF
(H) Hosts

All matches were played in Guangzhou, China PR.

12 July 1988

Guangdong Wanbao (China)	3–1	(Japan) Yamaha Motors

12 July 1988

April 25 (North Korea)	3–0	(Hong Kong) South China

14 July 1988

Yamaha Motors (Japan)	9–2	(Macau) Wa Seng

14 July 1988

Guangdong Wanbao (China)	1–0	(Hong Kong) South China

16 July 1988

Yamaha Motors (Japan)	1–1	(Hong Kong) South China

16 July 1988

April 25 (North Korea)	4–0	(Macau) Wa Seng

18 July 1988

South China (Hong Kong)	3–0	(Macau) Wa Seng

18 July 1988

April 25 (North Korea)	1–0	(China) Guangdong Wanbao

20 July 1988

Guangdong Wanbao (China)	7–1	(Macau) Wa Seng

20 July 1988

April 25 (North Korea)	3–1	(Japan) Yamaha Motors

== Semi Final Group round ==
=== Group A ===
Pos	Team	Pld	W	D	L	GF	GA	GD	Pts	Qualification
1	(Iraq) Al-Rasheed	3	2	1	0	7	1	+6	5	Advance to Final
2	(China) Guangdong Wanbao (H)	3	1	2	0	8	2	+6	4	
3	(Kuwait) Kazma SC	3	1	1	1	2	3	−1	3	
4	(India) Mohun Bagan	3	0	0	3	0	11	−11	0	

Source: RSSSF
(H) Hosts

All match were played in Guangzhou, China PR.

9 October 1988

Kazma SC (Kuwait)	1–0	(India) Mohun Bagan
Yusuf (pen.)

9 October 1988

Al-Rasheed (Iraq)	1–1	(China) Guangdong Wanbao
Salam Meghamis 90' (pen.)		Liao Yuhua 51'

11 October 1988

Guangdong Wanbao (China)	6–0	(India) Mohun Bagan
Aloke Mukherjee 7' (o.g.); Liao Yuhua 18', 31', 87'; Xie Yuxin 46'; Li Caobo 77'

11 October 1988

Al-Rasheed (Iraq)	2–0	(Kuwait) Kazma SC

13 October 1988

Guangdong Wanbao (China)	1–1	(Kuwait) Kazma SC
Unknown		Sowayed 21'

13 October 1988

Al-Rasheed (Iraq)	4–0	(India) Mohun Bagan
Amishaki; G.Akal; Scheherar; Amis

=== Group B ===
Pos	Team	Pld	W	D	L	GF	GA	GD	Pts	Qualification
1	(Qatar) Al-Sadd	4	3	1	0	8	4	+4	10	Advance to Final
2	(Saudi Arabia) Al-Ettifaq	4	2	1	1	9	5	+4	7	
3	(North Korea) April 25	4	1	1	2	4	4	0	4	
4	(Bangladesh) Mohammedan SC	4	1	1	2	5	7	−2	4	
5	(Malaysia) Pahang FA (H)	4	1	0	3	3	9	−6	3	

Source: RSSSF
(H) Hosts

All match were played in Kuantan, Malaysia.

5 October 1988

Al-Sadd (Qatar)	2–0	(Malaysia) Pahang FA
Khalid Daud 52'; Jawhar 78' (pen.)

5 October 1988

April 25 (North Korea)	0–1	(Bangladesh) Mohammedan SC
		Sabbir 89'

7 October 1988

Al-Ettifaq (Saudi Arabia)	4–1	(Malaysia) Pahang FA
Abdullah Al-Dosari 42'; Sadoon Al-Swiete 44'; Hamed Al-Dubalki 56'; Jamal Al-Mubarak 85'		Basrulkharfi Abdul Hadi 75'

7 October 1988

Al-Sadd (Qatar)	2–2	(Bangladesh) Mohammedan SC
Unknown 6'; Ebrahim Kyumarth		Taheri 26'; Montu 55'

9 October 1988

Al-Sadd (Qatar)	2–1	(North Korea) April 25
Ebrahim Kyumarth (?), 75'		Han Chang Bok 17'

9 October 1988

Al-Ettifaq (Saudi Arabia)	3–1	(Bangladesh) Mohammedan SC
Jamal Al-Mubarak 5'; Sadoon Al-Swiete 55'; Sami Al-Dosari 67'		Kaiser 73'

11 October 1988

Mohammedan SC (Bangladesh)	1–2	(Malaysia) Pahang FA
Sabbir		Sayomchai 15', 54'

11 October 1988

Al-Ettifaq (Saudi Arabia)	1–1	(North Korea) April 25
Zaki Al-Saleh		Choe Won Nam 47'

13 October 1988

Al-Sadd (Qatar)	2–1	(Saudi Arabia) Al-Ettifaq
Jawhar 62' (pen.); Salleh Mahamoud 88'		Jamal Al-Mubarak 89'

13 October 1988

April 25 (North Korea)	2–0	(Malaysia) Pahang FA
Kim Yum Chol 49', 66'

== Final ==
Team 1	Agg.	Team 2	1st leg	2nd leg
Al-Sadd (Qatar)	3–3 (a)	(Iraq) Al-Rasheed	2–3	1–0

31 March 1989

Al-Rasheed (Iraq)	3–2	(Qatar) Al-Sadd
Radhi 20'; Abdul-Kadhim 24', 35'		Salman 56'; Ghanim 85'

Al-Shaab Stadium, Baghdad
Attendance: 10,000
Referee: Abdullah Al-Naser (Saudi Arabia)

8 April 1989

Al-Sadd (Qatar)	1–0	(Iraq) Al-Rasheed
Salman 82'

Jassim bin Hamad Stadium, Doha
Attendance: 5,000
Referee: Jasim Mendi (Bahrain)

3–3 on aggregate; Al-Sadd won on away goals.
