= 2017 Budha Subba Gold Cup =

Tournament details
- Host country: Nepal
- City: Dharan
- Dates: 16 – 25 February 2017
- Teams: 10
- Venue(s): ANFA Technical Center Dharan-17

Final positions
- Champions: Nepal Police Club (5th title)
- Runners-up: (Nepal) Sankata FC

Tournament statistics
- Matches played: 9
- Goals scored: 27 (3 per match)
- Top scorer(s): (Nepal) Ju Manu Rai (4 goals)
- Best player(s): (Nepal) Ju Manu Rai
- Best goalkeeper: (Nepal) Roshan Khadka

The 2017 Budha Subba Gold Cup was the 19th edition of the Budha Subba Gold Cup, held in Dharan. 10 teams participated in the tournament. The defending champions Manang Marshyangdi Club did not participate. All matches were held at the ANFA Technical Center Dharan-17. In total, eight teams from Nepal participated in the tournament and were joined by two teams from India. United Sikkim FC from Gangtok supposed to play but had to withdraw. It was replaced by Kanchanjunga FC.

== Teams ==
| Team | City |
|---|---|
| Dharan FC Red | Dharan |
| Dharan FC Yellow | Dharan |
| Karkarvitta Training Center Jhapa | Kakarvitta |
| APF Club | Kathmandu |
| Nepal Police Club | Kathmandu |
| Sankata FC | Kathmandu |
| Pokhara FC | Pokhara |
| Rupandehi FC | Rupandehi |
| Durgapur Steel Calcutta | Calcutta, India |
| Kanchanjunga FC | Silguri, India |

== Bracket ==
The following is the bracket which the 2017 Budha Subba Gold Cup resembled. Numbers in parentheses next to the match score represent the results of a penalty shoot-out.

Qualification games
Sankata FC | 3
Durgapur Steel Calcutta | 2
Nepal Police Club | 1 (10)
Dharan F.C. (Yellow) | 1(9)

Quarter-finals
APF Club | 0
Sankata FC | 1
Karkarvitta Training Center Jhapa | 1(1)
Rupandehi FC | 1(3)
Pokhara FC | 0
Dharan F.C. Red | 3
Kanchanjunga FC | 2
Nepal Police Club | 3

Semifinals
Sankata FC | 2
Rupandehi FC | 1
Dharan F.C. Red | 1
Nepal Police Club | 3

Final
Sankata FC | 1(5)
Nepal Police Club | 1(6)

== Awards and prize money ==
- Winning team: NPRs 500,000
- Runners-up: NPRs 250,000
- Highest goal scorer award: NPRs 12,500
- Best coach award: NPRs 15,000
- Best striker award: NPRs 15,000
- Best midfielder award: NPRs 15,000
- Best defender award: NPRs 15,000
- Best goalkeeper award: NPRs 15,000
- Rising player of the tournament award: NPRs 10,000
