= Sami Jasem Al-Dosari =

Saudi Arabian footballer

Personal information
- Date of birth: 11 March 1965 (age 61)
- Position: Defender

International career
Years	Team	Apps	(Gls)
- Saudi Arabia

Sami Jasem Al-Dosari (born 11 March 1965) is a Saudi Arabian footballer. He competed in the men's tournament at the 1984 Summer Olympics.
