= Rajendra Rawal =

Nepalese footballer

Personal information
- Full name: Rajendra Rawal
- Place of birth: Nepal
- Position: Midfielder

Team information
- Current team: Jawalakhel YC

International career
Years	Team	Apps	(Gls)
- Nepal

Rajendra Rawal (Nepali: राजेन्द्र रावल) is a Nepali professional football midfielder, who currently plays for Jawalakhel YC in the Martyr's Memorial A-Division League.
