= Victor Amobi =

Nigerian professional footballer

Personal information
- Full name: Victor Amobi Ozoanibueze
- Date of birth: 3 July 1990 (age 36)
- Place of birth: Nigeria
- Position: Winger

Youth career
- 2010-2012: AV Soccer Academy

Senior career*
Years	Team	Apps	(Gls)
2012–2013	Three Star Club	20	(5)
2013–2014	Friends Club	17	(4)
2015–2016	Three Star Club	16	(4)
2017	Minerva Punjab	18	(1)
2018	Manang Marshyangdi Club	12	(5)
2018–2019	Saraswati Youth Club	12	(6)
2019–2020	Forward Club	10	(8)
- * Club domestic league appearances and goals

Victor Amobi (born 3 July 1990) is a Nigerian professional footballer who plays as a winger.

== Career ==
From Nigeria, Amobi moved to Nepal and has played for sides such as Three Star Club, friends Club, African United Club, and Three Star Club.

=== Minerva Punjab ===
In December 2016, it was announced that Amobi signed with Minerva Punjab of the I-League in India. He made his debut for the club on 8 January 2017 in their opening league match of the season against Chennai City. He started and played the whole match as Minerva Punjab drew 0–0.

== Career statistics ==
As of 8 January 2017

Club	Season	League			League Cup		Domestic Cup		Continental		Total	
Club	Season	Division	Apps	Goals	Apps	Goals	Apps	Goals	Apps	Goals	Apps	Goals
Minerva Punjab	2016–17	I-League	18	1	—	—	0	0	—	—	18	1
Career total			18	1	0	0	0	0	0	0	18	1
