= Narinda Government High School =

School in Dhaka, Bangladesh

Coordinates: 23.7146°N 90.4207°E

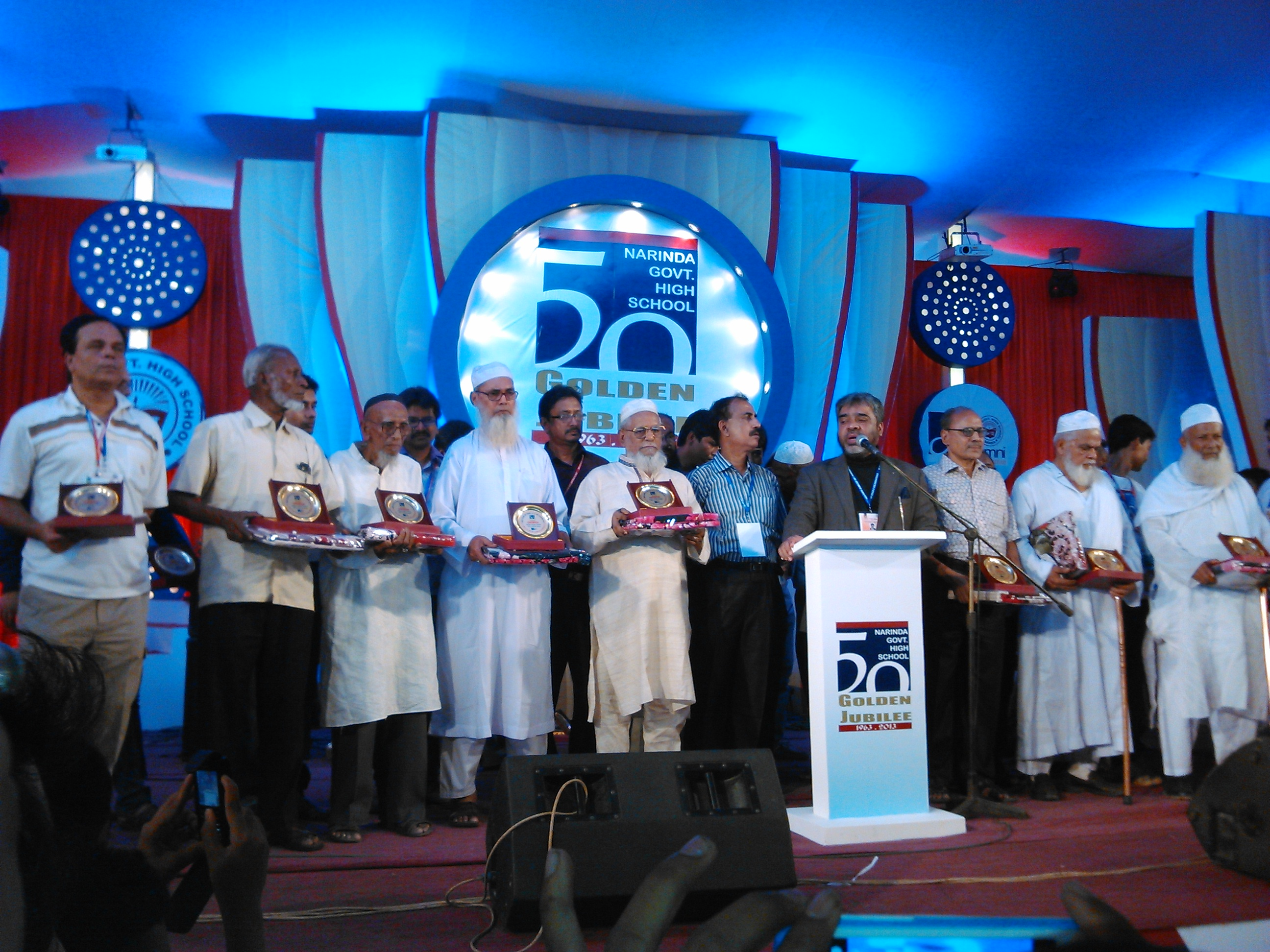
Golden jubilee celebration of Narinda school in Dhaka, Bangladesh

Narinda Government High School (NGHS) is a secondary school in Gendaria Thana, Dhaka, Bangladesh. It was established in 1963. It offers Bangla medium education from Class Three through Ten. It follows Bangladesh government's educational curriculum under Ministry of Education. The location of NGHS is at Vaghbat Saha Shankar Nidi Road behind Christian Graveyard near Goriah Moth (renowned Hindu Temple).

Location On Google Maps

It has three four-storied buildings, one Hall room (student common room), library room, computer laboratory room, science laboratory hall and a big play ground. The school campus contains various types of flower trees and fruit trees. The school runs through governing body and teachers. It has two shifts: Morning and Day, one headmaster, two assistant headmasters and 65 other teachers.

The school not only offers academic education but also co-curricula such as Bangladesh National Cadet Corps (BNCC), Scouting, The Red Crescent Unit. The schools sport teams attends in various national level competitions including handball tournament, cricket tournament, soccer tournament and athletic game, debate competition organized by both public and private sector.
