= Ahsanullah Montu =

Bangladeshi footballer

- Montu with Bangladesh in the 80s

Personal information
- Full name: Mohammed Ahsanullah Montu
- Date of birth: 7 February 1962
- Date of death: 26 June 2018 (aged 56)
- Place of death: Dhaka, Bangladesh
- Height: 1.80 m (5 ft 11 in)
- Positions: Center-back; right wing-back

Youth career
- 1980: Prantik

Senior career*
Years	Team	Apps	(Gls)
1981–1982	Farashganj		
1983	Brothers Union		
1984–1985	Sadharan Bima		
1986–1994	Mohammedan		
1998–2000	Prantik		

International career
1984	Bangladesh U19		
1986	Bangladesh B		
1986–1989	Bangladesh		

Managerial career
- 2014: Bangladesh U12
- * Club domestic league appearances and goals

Ahsanullah Montu (Bengali: আহসানউল্লাহ মন্টু; 7 February 1962 – 26 June 2018) was a Bangladeshi football player and coach. He represented the Bangladesh national team from 1986 to 1989, and spent most of his club career playing for Mohammedan SC.

== Club career ==
In 1981, Montu began his career in the Dhaka First Division League with Farashganj SC. He also had short stints with Brothers Union and Sadharan Bima CSC. In 1986, Montu joined Mohammedan SC and under the coaching of Iran's Nasser Hejazi, Montu established himself as one of the best defenders in the country with the Black and Whites. He won the league title in 1986, 1987, 1988–89 and 1993. In 1988, he played for Mohammedan in India's Sait Nagjee Trophy. On 7 October 1988, Montu scored the equaliser in a 2–2 draw against Qatar's Al-Sadd, in the semi-final group round of the 1988–89 Asian Club Championship. After a long absence from football, he officially retired after playing fifteen minutes in the first half for Prantik KC against Mohammedan in the Federation Cup on 19 August 2000.

== International career ==
He got a place in the Bangladesh U19 team while playing for Brothers Union in 1984. The following year, he represented Bangladesh Green team in the 1986 President's Gold Cup. In the same year, he was part of the Mohammedan team which played as Bangladesh in the Nepal Panchayat Silver Jubilee Cup. He also represented the Bangladesh Red team in the 1987 and 1989 editions of the President's Gold Cup. He also played in the qualifiers for the 1990 FIFA World Cup and 1988 AFC Asian Cup.

== Coaching career ==
In 2014, Montu served as the head coach of the Bangladesh U12 team which participated in the U-12 Super Mokh Cup held in Malaysia. He also worked as a football trainer at the Bangladesh Krira Shikkha Protishtan (BKSP).

== Death ==
On 26 June 2018, Montu died after suffering a cardiac arrest.

== Honours ==
Mohammedan SC

- Dhaka First Division/Premier Division League: 1986, 1987, 1988–89, 1993
- Federation Cup: 1987, 1989
- Ma-O-Moni Gold Cup: 1990
