= Safal =

Indian retail network of fruits and vegetables

Safal is the largest organised retail network of fruits and vegetables in the National Capital Region of India. Currently it operates over 400 retail outlets in the NCR region. Safal is owned by Mother Dairy, a subsidiary of the National Dairy Development Board. Safal was started in 1988 as an Indian government initiative to benefit fruit & vegetable producers and the urban consumers. The task was assigned to the National Dairy Development Board, as they had similar experience in the related sector of milk. Safal's supply chain covers 16 states, around 50,000 farmers and over 200 farmer associations.
