= Aaha! Gold Cup =

Football tournament held in Pokhara, Nepal

Aaha Rara Pokhara Gold Cup आहा रारा गोल्ड कप
- 2026 edition logo
- Founded: 2002; 2003 (current format)
- Region: Nepal
- Teams: 12
- Most championships: Nepal Police Club; Manang Marshyangdi Club (6 titles each)
- Broadcaster: Himalaya TV

Aaha Rara Pokhara Gold Cup (Nepali: आहा ! गोल्ड कप, romanized: āhā gōlḍ kap) is an annual international football tournament held in Pokhara, Nepal, and organized by the Sahara Club. It was formerly known as the Caravan Gold Cup. It is considered a major football tournament in Nepal, and is therefore endorsed by ANFA Kaski, a district FA of the All Nepal Football Association.

== Background ==
Sahara Club (Pokhara) have been running a football academy for under-privileged children from the profit of the tournament and donations from various individuals and organisations. At present, there are 30 children at the academy.

The major attraction of the cup is the involvement of major clubs of Nepal and some international clubs. The cup is recognized by ANFA and is included in its annual calendar. The tournament is conducted in a knockout format and 12 teams compete for the title. The tournament is the main event keeping the spirit of football alive in Nepal and handsomely rewards the clubs and players. It is also the longest sporting event to be held regularly. For the first time in history in 2019 there were only 10 club competing due to tight schedule of tournament all over Nepal and Date issue.

On the 13th edition of the tournament, English non-league side Aldershot Town FC entered in the tournament, and thus became the first European (UEFA) club to compete in the tournament's history.

Due to the COVID-19 pandemic, 19th edition of the tournament only featured 8 teams. The 20th edition was held with 1/3 of the spectators allowed by following Covid safety protocols.

== Previous winners ==
| Title | Year B.S. | Year A.D. | Winners | Runners-up | Refs. |
|---|---|---|---|---|---|
| Caravan Gold Cup | 2058 | 2002 | Nepal Police Club | Manang Marsyangdi Club | |
| 1. Aaha! Rara Gold Cup | 2059 | 2003 | Nepal Police Club | Friends Club | |
| 2. Aaha! Rara Gold Cup | 2060 | 2004 | Manang Marsyangdi Club | (India) Carlton Football Club | |
| 3. Aaha! Rara Gold Cup | 2061 | 2005 | Manang Marsyangdi Club | Nepal Police Club | |
| 4. Aaha! Rara Gold Cup | 2062 | 2006 | African United Club | Nepal Police Club | |
| 5. Aaha! Rara Gold Cup | 2063 | 2007 | Three Star Club | Manang Marsyangdi Club | |
| 6. Aaha! Rara Gold Cup | 2064 | 2008 | Nepal Police Club | Nepal A.P.F. Club | |
| 7. Aaha! Gold Cup | 2065 | 2009 | Nepal Police Club | Nepal Army Club | |
| 8. Aaha! Rara Rara Gold Cup | 2066 | 2010 | Nepal Police Club | Tribhuvan Army Club | |
| 9. Aaha! Rara Gold Cup | 2067 | 2011 | Three Star Club | Manang Marsyangdi Club | |
| 10. Aaha! Rara Gold Cup | 2068 | 2012 | Manang Marsyangdi Club | Jawalakhel YC | |
| 11. Aaha! Rara Gold | 2069 | 2013 | Three Star Club | Sahara Club (Pokhara) | |
| 12. Aaha! Rara Gold Cup | 2070 | 2014 | Sahara Club (Pokhara) | Manang Marshyangdi Club | |
| 13. Aaha! Rara Gold Cup | 2071 | 2015 | Three Star Club | Manang Marshyangdi Club | |
| 14. Aaha! Rara Gold Cup | 2072 | 2016 | Manang Marshyangdi Club | Nepal Army Club | |
| 15. Aaha! Rara Gold Cup | 2073 | 2017 | Manang Marshyangdi Club | Sahara Club (Pokhara) | |
| 16. Aaha! Rara Gold Cup | 2074 | 2018 | Nepal Police Club | Three Star Club | |
| 17. Aaha! Rara Gold Cup | 2075 | 2019 | Three Star Club | Nepal Army Club | |
| 18. Aaha! Rara Gold Cup | 2076 | 2020 | Manang Marshyangdi Club | Nepal Police Club | |
| 19. Aaha! Rara Gold Cup | 2077 | 2021 | Sankata Club | African Roots Association | |
| 20. Aaha Rara Gold Cup | 2078 | 2022 | Nepal A.P.F. Club | Manang Marshyangdi Club | |
| 21. Aaha Rara Gold Cup | 2079 | 2023 | Sankata Club | Bhutanese Youth Club | |
| 22. Aaha Rara Gold Cup | 2080 | 2024 | Nepal Army | Three Star Club | |
| 23. Aaha Rara Gold Cup | 2081 | 2025 | (Uzbekistan) Black Bulls FC | Nepal Police F.C. | |
| 24. Aaha Rara Gold Cup | 2082 | 2026 | Sahara Club (Pokhara) | Jawalakhel YC | |

== Top performing clubs ==
| Club | Winners | Runners-up |
|---|---|---|
| Nepal Police Club | 6 | 2 |
| Manang Marshyangdi Club | 6 | 6 |
| Three Star Club | 5 | 2 |
| Nepal Army Club (formerly Tribhuwan Army) | 2 | 4 |
| Sahara Club (Pokhara) | 2 | 2 |
| Sankata Club | 2 | 0 |
| Nepal A.P.F. Club | 1 | 1 |
| African United Club | 1 | 0 |
| (India) Carlton Football Club | 0 | 1 |
| Friends Club | 0 | 1 |
| Jawalakhel Youth Club | 0 | 2 |
| African Roots Association | 0 | 1 |

== See also ==
- Birat Gold Cup
- Simara Gold Cup
- KP Oli Cup
- Pokhara Cup
- Budha Subba Gold Cup
- Jhapa Gold Cup
- Tribhuvan Challenge Shield
- ANFA Cup
