= Pokhara Rangasala =

Multi-purpose stadium in Nepal

Coordinates: 28°12′16″N 83°59′30″E

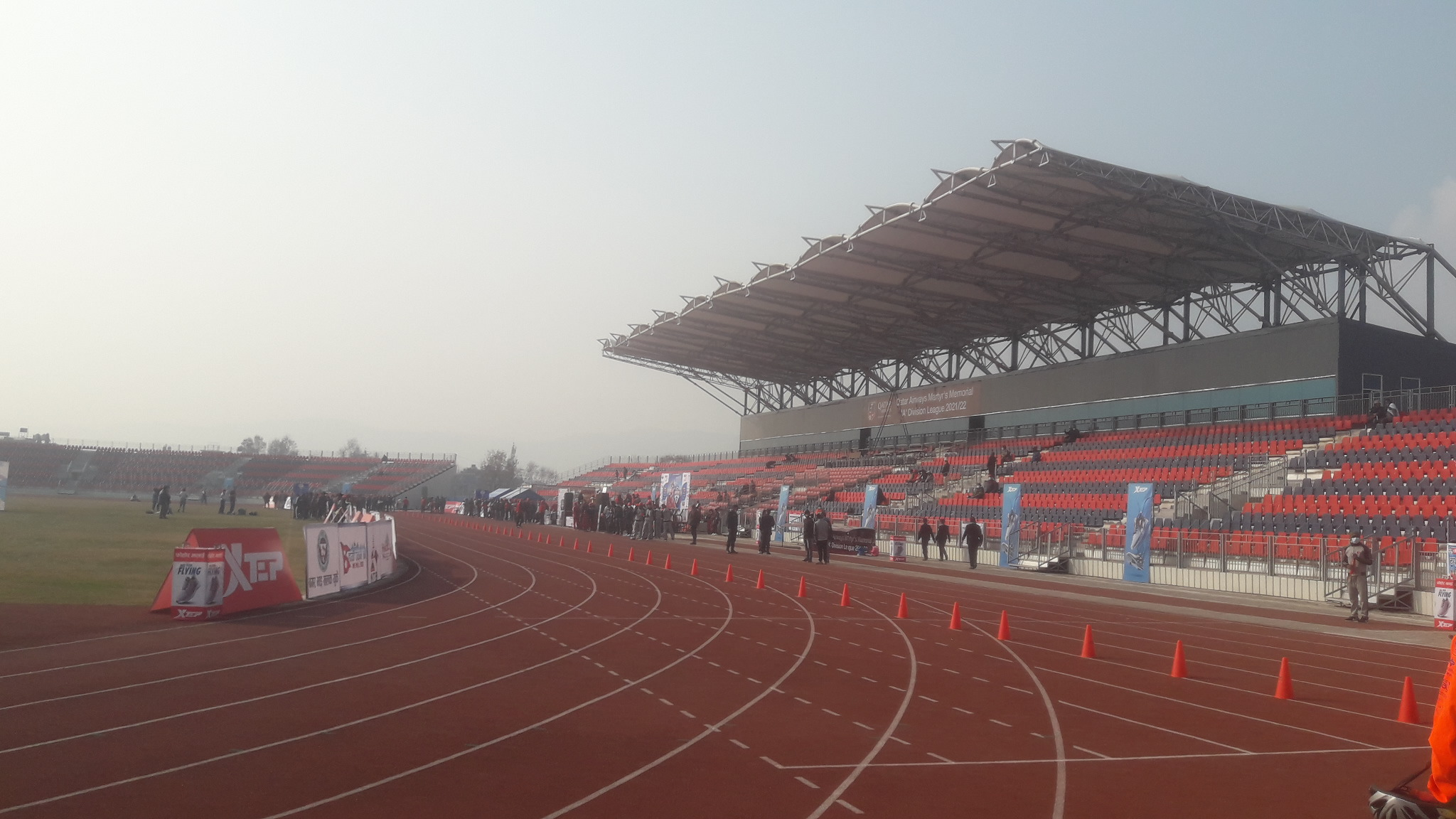
- Interactive map of Pokhara Rangasala
- Former names: Annapurna Stadium
- Location: Pokhara, Nepal
- Elevation: 822 m (2,697 ft)
- Owner: All Nepal Football Association, Gandaki Province Sports Development Council
- Capacity: 18,500

Construction
- Built: 1980
- Cost: Rs. 1.3 billion

Tenants
- Sahara Club (Pokhara); Nepal national football team (selected matches); Pokhara Thunders

The Pokhara Rangasala (Nepali: पोखरा रङ्गशाला) is a multi-purpose stadium in Pokhara, Gandaki Province, Nepal. It has a capacity of 18,500 spectators. The venue is located to the south of Pokhara at Rambazaar on the eastern bank of Seti river.

== History ==
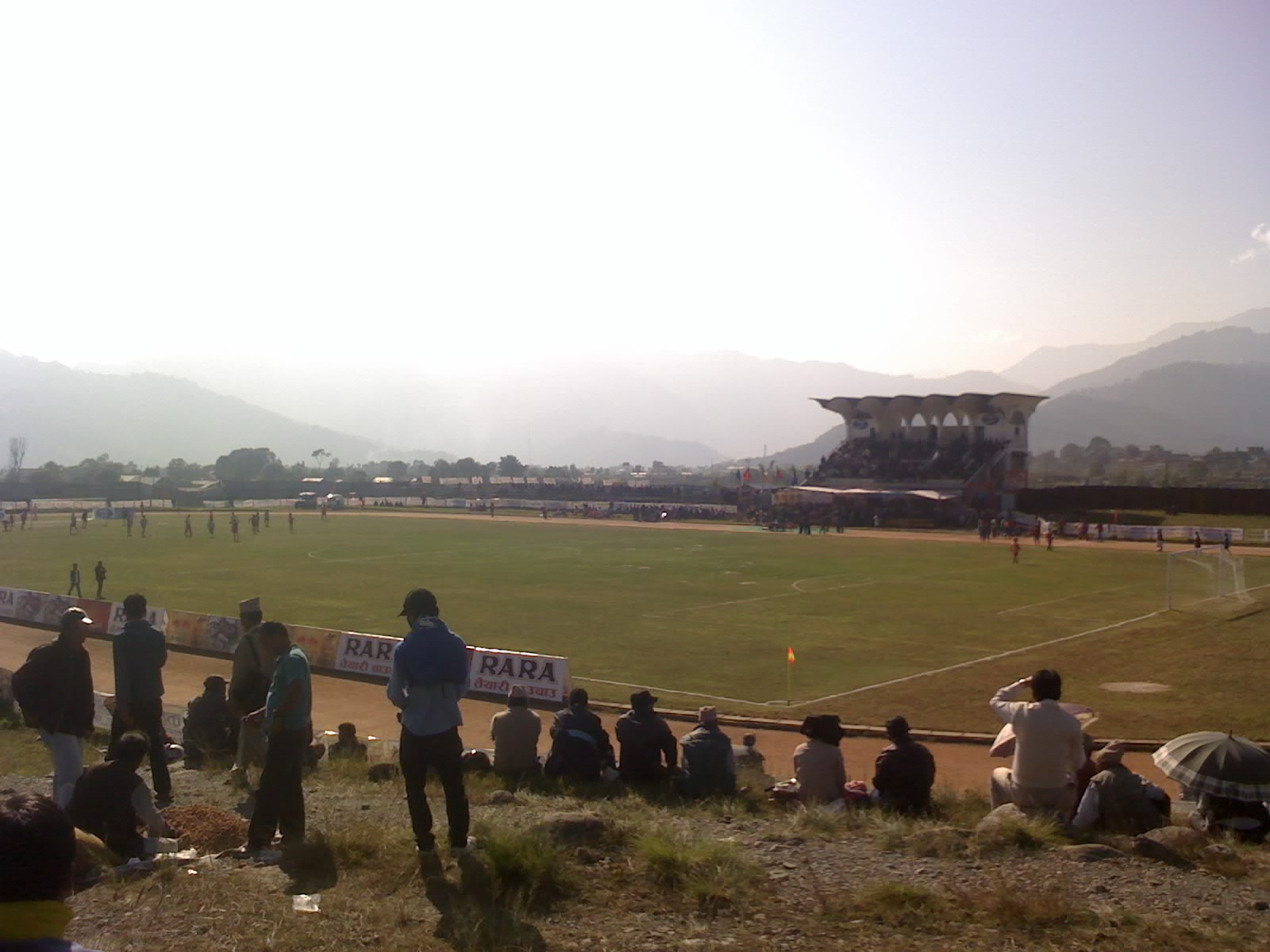
Pokhara Rangashala before renovation

The facility comprises a football stadium surrounded by an athletics track of 400m, one 7-a side football ground, a volleyball court, a basketball court, a cricket ground and covered hall for badminton, table tennis, karate, judo, wrestling, boxing, mixed martial arts and other indoor sports. The administrative buildings of Kaski district sports office and ANFA Kaski are located here. It is the only venue in Nepal beside Dasarath Rangasala Stadium to host international football matches. The stadium has hosted several international friendly matches of the Nepal national football team.

== Hosted events ==
International games:

- 2019 South Asian Games

Football:

- Aaha Gold Cup
- Football at the 2019 South Asian Games – Women's tournament
- Martyr's Memorial A-Division League
- 9th National Games of Nepal

== See also ==
- Football in Nepal
- List of football stadiums in Nepal
