= African United Club =

African United
- Full name: African United Club
- Nickname(s): AUC
- Manager: Sugan Tandukar
- Coach: Kamal Bista
Home colours	Away colours	Third colours

African United Club (AUC) are an all-star association football club in Nepal composed of the best African talent in the country. Mainly from the top flight clubs. However, due to the lack of a professional African goalkeeper in Nepal, a Nepalese goalkeeper is used. AUC currently hold the title of 2014 Udayapur Gold Cup winners. The current captain is Victor Amobi.

== See also ==
- Football in Nepal
