= Dharan F.C. =

- Full name: Dharan Football Club
- Founded: 1998; 27 years ago
- Ground: Dharan Stadium
- Capacity: 15,000
- Chairman: Kishwor Rai
Home colours

Dharan Football Club is a football club based in Dharan, Nepal. The club which plays its home games at Dharan Stadium also annually organizes the Budha Subba Gold Cup.
