= Football at the 1989 South Asian Games =

1989 Men's South Asian Games Football Tournament
Tournament details
- Host country: Pakistan
- Dates: 20–26 October
- Teams: 6 (from 1 confederation)

Final positions
- Champions: Pakistan (1st title)
- Runners-up: Bangladesh
- Third place: India

Tournament statistics
- Matches played: 8
- Goals scored: 14 (1.75 per match)
- Top scorer(s): (India) Satyajit Chatterjee (Bangladesh) Rizvi Karim Rumi (2 goals each)

The men's football tournament at the 1989 South Asian Games was held from 20 to 26 October in Pakistan. The hosts emerged as the champions, defeating Bangladesh in the final, with Haji Abdul Sattar scoring the solitary goal for Pakistan in the final.

== Fixtures and results ==
=== Group A ===
Pos	Team	Pld	W	D	L	GF	GA	GD	Pts	Qualification
1	Bangladesh	2	1	1	0	4	1	+3	3	Gold medal match
2	India	2	1	1	0	3	2	+1	3	Bronze medal match
3	Sri Lanka	2	0	0	2	1	5	−4	0	

Source: RSSSF
Rules for classification: 1) points; 2) goal difference; 3) goals scored; 4) head-to-head result.
21 October 1989

Bangladesh	3–0	Sri Lanka
Rumi 19', 72'; Sabbir 24'	Report

Jinnah Sports Stadium, Islamabad

23 October 1989

Bangladesh	1–1	India
Manik 34'	Report	Satyajit 84' (pen.)

Jinnah Sports Stadium, Islamabad
Referee: Ahmed Ibrahim Hakeem

25 October 1989

India	2–1	Sri Lanka
Ghosh 39'; Kongsai 66'	Report	Silva 54'

Jinnah Sports Stadium, Islamabad
Referee: Ahmed Ibrahim Hakeem

=== Group B ===
Pos	Team	Pld	W	D	L	GF	GA	GD	Pts	Qualification
1	Pakistan	2	1	1	0	4	2	+2	3	Gold medal match
2	Nepal	2	1	0	1	2	3	−1	2	Bronze medal match
3	Maldives	2	0	1	1	3	4	−1	1	

Source: RSSSF
Rules for classification: 1) points; 2) goal difference; 3) goals scored; 4) head-to-head result.
20 October 1989

Maldives	0–0	Nepal
	Report

Jinnah Sports Stadium, Islamabad

22 October 1989

Pakistan	0–0	Nepal
	Report

Jinnah Sports Stadium, Islamabad

24 October 1989

Pakistan	2–0	Maldives
Ashfaq 38'; Sharafat 54'	Report

Jinnah Sports Stadium, Islamabad

== Medal Matches ==
=== Bronze medal match ===
26 October 1989

India	2–1	Nepal
Afonso 18'; Satyajit 62'	Report	Mani Shah 56'

Jinnah Sports Stadium, Islamabad
Referee: Ahmed Ali

=== Gold medal match ===
26 October 1989

Pakistan	1–0	Bangladesh
Sattar 90'	Report

Jinnah Sports Stadium, Islamabad
Attendance: 40,000
Referee: Dezfouly Hadi (Iran)

== Winner ==
Men's Football at the 1989 South Asian Games

Pakistan
First title

== Goalscorers ==
There have been 14 goals scored in 8 matches, for an average of 1.75 goals per match.

2 goals

- (Bangladesh) Rizvi Karim Rumi
- (India) Satyajit Chatterjee

1 goal

- (Bangladesh) Rumman Bin Wali Sabbir
- (Bangladesh) Nurul Haque Manik
- (Pakistan) Qazi Ashfaq
- (Pakistan) Sharafat Ali
- (Pakistan) Haji Abdul Sattar
- (Sri Lanka) Anton Silva
- (India) Sisir Ghosh
- (India) Lalkohao Kongsai
- (India) Mauricio Afonso
- (Nepal) Mani Shah
