= Sahara Club (Pokhara) =

Social welfare organization in Nepal

Sahara Club Pokhara is a social welfare organization established in 1998. It works to enhance the standard of Nepalese football by running a social football academy in Pokhara. The academy assembles street boys and orphans from different districts of Nepal. The club is unique as it has been successful in highlighting the causes it espouses by using the most sought-out game football.

== Sahara academy ==
The academy is the main highlight of the club, shaping the lives of more than 30 children. Sahara Club academy is in Dobilla, Pokhara which covers 26 ropanees of land. The academy has an academy building with necessary facilities and a football ground, giving children training with proper education and shelter. The club has to depend upon its yearly Football Tournament Aaha Gold Cup. The profit goes to the fund of the academy. The club also receives donations, mainly from non-resident Nepalis residing in UK, foreigners and other charity organizations. The most notable product from the club is the national striker Anil Gurung. The academy is the first in Nepal to be run by a club.

== Aaha Rara Gold Cup ==
Formerly known as the Caravan Gold Cup, it was later renamed to the Aaha! Rara Gold Cup. The tournament is supported by the ANFA and is included in its yearly calendar. Since 2026, Pokhara Women's Gold Cup is also played.

== See also ==
- Football in Nepal
