= Abdus Sadeque =

Bangladeshi field hockey player (1946–2026)

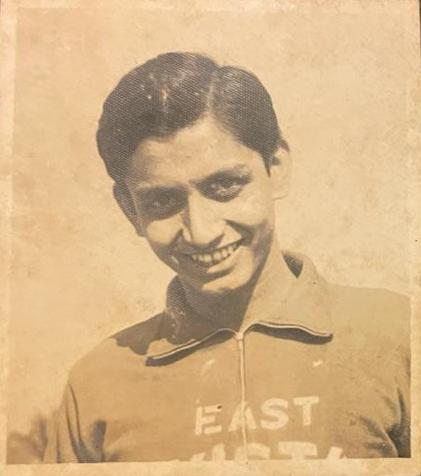
- Sadeque in 1964
- Born: 18 September 1946; Dacca, Bengal Province, British India
- Died: 20 June 2026 (aged 79); Dhaka, Bangladesh
- Resting place: Banani Graveyard, Dhaka, Bangladesh
- Field hockey career
- Sport: Field hockey
- Position: Centre-half
Senior career
Years	Team	Caps	Goals
1961–1963	Azad SC	-	-
1964–1969	Armanitola Club	-	-
1970	Ispahani Club	-	-
1972–1981	Abahani Krira Chakra	-	-
National team
Years	Team	Caps	Goals
1969–1971	Pakistan	1	(0)
1978	Bangladesh	5	(0)
Coaching career
- 1975–1979: Abahani Krira Chakra
- 1986: Bangladesh
Association football career
- Position: Center-back
Senior career*
Years	Team	Apps	(Gls)
1965–1968	Azad SC		
1969–1970	Dilkusha SC		
1972–1977	Abahani Krira Chakra		
Managerial career
- 1975–1979: Abahani Krira Chakra
- 1981: Team BJMC
- * Club domestic league appearances and goals

Abdus Sadeque (Bengali: আবদুস সাদেক, Urdu: عبدالصادق; 18 September 1946 – 20 June 2026) was a Pakistani and Bangladeshi field hockey player. Due to pronunciation, transcription and transliteration issues, spellings of his name are recorded as Abdus Sadiq or Abdul Sadiq in Pakistani sports books, old newspapers and on the website of Pakistan Hockey Federation. Spellings of his second name Sadeque are sometimes written as Sadek by Bangladeshi newspapers. He represented the national hockey teams of both Pakistan and Bangladesh. He also played domestic football in the 1970s. After his retirement as player, he became Bangladeshi field hockey organiser, trainer and administrator.

== Early career ==
Sadeque studied at the Armanitola Government High School, Dacca and the Dacca University. He was a law graduate and held master's degree in political science.

He was selected for training as a field hockey player when he was a high-school student in Dacca in the early 1960s. The Pakistan Sports Control Board (now Pakistan Sports Board) organised one-month Students Hockey Training Camp during June–July 1961 at the Lahore Stadium (now Gaddafi Stadium), Lahore. Around 60 young students from boards of secondary education institutions and universities in both parts of Pakistan (East Pakistan and West Pakistan) attended the camp. Former Pakistan hockey team captain Olympian Muhammad Niaz Khan supervised the camp while Olympian Ahsan Khan and Nabi Ahmed Kallat were the coaches.

== Hockey career ==
=== East Pakistan hockey team ===
Sadeque represented East Pakistan in the National Hockey Championship from 1964 to 1970. He was instrumental in the East Pakistan field hockey team's only win in the National Hockey Championship from 1948 to 1970 when they beat Pakistan Navy by a solitary goal on 1 April 1967, in Karachi. In next day's Karachi-based English newspaper Dawn, its sports correspondent Haleem Ahmad wrote: "In seventeen [17]-year old Sadek, East Pakistan has a centre-half, which any team in West Pakistan would gladly welcome.

He represented East Pakistan in side matches played against a number of foreign hockey teams visiting East Pakistan from 1964 to 1968. These included teams from Japan, Holland, Australia and Malaysia.

Sadeque was a member of the East Pakistan field hockey team which played exhibition matches at Lyallpur, Rawalpindi, Sheikhupura, Lahore and Multan in April 1968. He also scored a goal at Lyallpur. The tour was arranged before the National Hockey Championship at Bahawalpur.

=== Pakistan hockey team ===
Abdus Sadeque was selected to Pakistan Junior hockey team under the captaincy of Fazalur Rehman that remained runners-up in the International Hockey Tournament at Lahore in March 1969.

In August 1969, he was selected to Pakistan hockey team under the captaincy of Khalid Mahmood for the European tour. The tour took place in September–October that year. Next year in August 1970, he was member of Pakistan hockey team under Khalid Mahmood visiting Kenya. He was also with the Pakistan hockey team for the 1971 Men's Hockey World Cup, however, as an observer this time. There were four other observers in the team namely Ibrahim Saber, Mudassar Asghar, Samiullah Khan and Iftikhar Ahmed Syed. Captain of the team was once again Khalid Mahmood.

Only two matches played by him from Pakistan hockey team are on record out of which one was an international match. Representing Pakistan on the right-half position, he played against Lower Saxony at Braunschweig, West Germany on 9 September 1969. He got Pakistan cap during Pakistan hockey team's tour of Italy in October 1969 during which they played four matches.

=== Bangladesh hockey team ===
Sadeque was appointed captain of the first Bangladesh hockey team when it took part in the 1978 Asian Games held in Bangkok, Thailand. He played five international matches for Bangladesh during the 1978 Asian Games. These included three pool matches against, Thailand (10 December 1978), Japan (12 December 1978) and Pakistan (15 December 1978), and consolation round matches against Sri Lanka (16 December 1978) and Hong Kong (18 December 1978).

He was the manager of the Bangladesh hockey team that participated in the 1982 Men's Hockey Asia Cup held at Karachi, Pakistan. Bangladesh secured fifth position in the tournament. He was coach of the Bangladesh hockey team for the 1986 Asian Games held in Seongnam, South Korea. Bangladesh stood 8th in the tournament.

Sadeque remained general secretary of the Bangladesh Hockey Federation for two terms i.e. 1982–84 and 2015–19.

== Football career ==
Besides field hockey, Sadeque was a fine football player and played football for 15 years for leading clubs in the Dhaka First Division League.

Sadeque began his football career with Azad Sporting Club in 1965, under the advice of the club's goalkeeper, Ranjit Das, who was also a member of the East Pakistan hockey team. In 1969, he league runners-up with Dilkusha SC. Sadeque joined newly-formed Abahani Krira Chakra in 1972, persuaded by one of the club's founding members, Sheikh Kamal. He was made the club's first ever captain and led the team during their first league game on 11 June 1972, against BJIC.

He later coached Abahani into becoming unbeaten league champions as coach in 1977. The following year, Sadeque, along with renowned local coaches Sheikh Shaheb Ali and Abdur Rahim, was involved in the selection process of the Bangladesh U19 national team for the 1978 AFC Youth Championship held in Dhaka.

Sadeque later served as head coach of BJIC (Team BJMC) in 1981 which was his final involvement with football.

== Illness and Death ==
Sadeque died on 20 June 2026, at the age of 79, after suffering from cancer for more than a year. He was laid to rest at the Banani Graveyard in Dhaka on 21 June 2026.

== Awards ==
Sadeque was awarded Bangladesh's National Sports Award in 1996. He was also awarded the lifetime achievement award 'Sheikh Kamal National Sports Council Award-2023' on 5 August 2023.

== See also ==
- Field hockey players who competed for more than one nation

== Bibliography ==
- Dulal, Mahmud (2014). পাকিস্তান জাতীয় দল বাঙালি খেলোয়াড় (transl. Bengali players in the Pakistan national team) (in Bengali). Bishhoshahitto Bhobon.
- Dulal, Mahmud (2020). খেলার মাঠে মুক্তিযুদ্ধ (transl. Liberation war in the playground) (in Bengali). Bishhoshahitto Bhobon. ISBN 978-984-8218-31-0.
- Alam, Masud (2017). ফুটবলের গল্প ফুটবলারদের গল্প (transl. The story of football the story of footballers) (in Bengali). Bishhoshahitto Bhobon. ISBN 9789849134688.
