= National Sports Awards (Bangladesh) =

- Discipline: athletics and organizers
- Local name: জাতীয় ক্রীড়া পুরস্কার (Bengali)

History
- First award: 1976
- Final award: 2020

The National Sports Awards are given by the Ministry of Youth and Sports of the government of Bangladesh for specific contributions in the field of games and sports. The award was introduced in 1976. As of 2011, total 175 sports personalities won the award.

== Awards ==
The awardees include the organisers of games and sports, and the individuals displaying extraordinary performances in football, hockey, cricket, swimming, shooting, chase, and athletics. Each awardee is entitled to a gold medal and twenty thousand taka in cash. Next the amount of cash was increased to tk 50,000 in May 2017 and now tk 1,00,000 each from November 2019.

== Winners ==
Year unknown

- Ataul Haq Mallik
- Zafar Imam (organiser)
- Mahboob-ul-Huq Payera
- Hamida Ali (handball)

1976

- Khondkar Nasim Ahmed (football)
- Abdul Hamid
- Mohammad Shahjahan (football)
- Hafiz Rashid (football)

1977

- Qazi Abdul Alim
- Sheikh Shaheb Ali (football)
- Alauddin Khan (football)

1978

- Romizuddin Ahmed (football)
- Nabi Chowdhury (football)
- Lutfunnessa Haq Bakul
- Manzur Hasan Mintu (football)
- Zakaria Pintoo (football)

1979

- Yusuf Reza (hockey)
- SA Jamman Mukta (athletics)
- Fazlur Rahman Arzu (football)
- Golam Sarwar Tipu (football)
- Wajeed Ali Miazi (football)

1980

- Abdur Rahim (football)
- Bashir Ahmed (hockey)
- Hafizuddin Ahmed (football)
- Rashid Ahmed (football)

1981

- Chinghla Mong Chowdhury Mari (football)

1982

- Dolly Catherine Cruz

1996

- Abdus Sadeque (field hockey)
- Amir Jang Ghaznavi (football)
- Ashraf Uddin Ahmed Chunnu (football)
- Arun Nandi (swimming)
- Shafique-ul Huque Heera

1997

- Ibrahim Saber (field hockey)

1998

- Akram Khan (cricket)
- Ashraf Chowdhury (football)
- Amalesh Sen (football)
- Monwar Hossain Nannu (football)

1999

- Sheikh Ashraf Ali (football)
- Zobera Rahman Linu (table tennis)
- Raquib Khandaker (organiser)

2000

- Abu Taher Batu (football)
- Sheikh Mohammad Aslam (football)

2001

- Zahirul Haque (football)
- Kabir Ahmed (football)
- Mohammed Kaikobad (football)
- Sheikh Daulat Zaman (cricket)
- Omar Khaled Rumi (cricket)
- Altaf Hossain (athletics)
- Roushan Akhter Chobi (athletics)
- Mohamed Shah Alam (athletics)
- Pratap Shankar Hazra (hockey)
- Hossain Imam Chowdhury Shanta (hockey)
- Havildar Major (retd) Mohammad Solaiman (swimming)
- Ziaur Rahman (chess)
- M Monwar ul Alam Babul (badminton)
- Kismat ul Hakim (badminton)
- ABM Mosaddekul Huq Rochi (table tennis)
- M Abdul Jalil (kabadi)
- Abdul Muyeed Chowdhury (organiser)
- Hosne Ara Khan (organiser)

2002

- Asif Hossain Khan (shooter)
- Maj Gen (retd) Khandoker Mohammad Nurunnabi (football)
- Khairul Anowar Pearu (football)
- Minhajul Abedin (cricket)
- Nasir Ahmed Nashu (cricket)
- M Azizullah Haider Jamal (hockey)
- Mosharraf Hossain Shamim (athletics)
- Mojibur Rahman Mallick (athletics)
- Shahbuddin Ahmed (shooting)
- Naik M Badshah Mia (kabadi)
- Begum Kamrun Nahar Hiru (judo)
- Reefat Bin-Sattar (chess)
- M Gholam Aziz Jilani (badminton)
- KZ Islam (organiser)
- Kutubuddin Ahmed (organiser)

2003

- Kaiser Hamid (football)
- Abdus Salam Murshedy (football)
- Jahangir Shah Badshah (cricket)
- Aminul Islam Bulbul (cricket)
- Mohamed Mahbub Alam (athletics)
- M Abdus Salam (swimming)
- Lt Col (retd) Heshamuddin Ahmad (organiser)

2004

- Mohamed Hossain Milzer (athletics)
- Enayetur Rahman Khan (football)
- Shahidur Rahman Shantoo (football)
- ASM Farooq (cricket)
- Abdul Malek Chunnu (hockey)
- Mahbubur Rahman (swimming)
- Laila Nur Begum (swimming)
- Nasimul Hasan Kachi (table tennis)
- Khurshida Aktar Khushi (judo)
- Abdul Halim (boxing)
- Sadeque Hossain Khoka (organiser)

2005

- Monem Munna (football)
- Golam Ambia (athletics)
- Nazrul Islam Rumi (athletics)
- Major (retd) Shahab-uddin Chakladar (hockey)
- Setara Begum (swimming)
- Bidyut Kumar Roy (weightlifting)
- Mahbub-ul Alam (judo)
- Ziaur Rahman (kabaddi)
- Siddiqur Rahman (golf)
- SA Sultan (organiser)
- Shah Nurul Kabir (organiser)

2006

- Hasanuzzaman Khan Bablu (football)
- Khandoker Wasim Iqbal (football)
- Mohammad Rafique (cricket)
- Begum Sharmin Akhter (shooting)
- Mohammad Ehetesham Sultan (hockey)
- Foujia Huda (athletics)
- Mahmuda Sharif (swimming)
- Azad Abul Kalam (body-building and weightlifting)
- Nayana Chowdhury (judo)
- MA Hamid (organiser)

2007

- Sharmila Roy (athletics)
- Ranjit Das (football)
- Amir Hossain Patwari (kabaddi)
- Lt com (retd) M Arshad (swimming)
- Aminul Islam (judo)
- Nurul Islam (hockey)
- Sheikh Abul Hashem (badminton)
- Rashiduddin Ahmad (basketball)
- Ataul Huq Mollik (organiser)
- Kazi Anisur Rahman (organiser)

2008

- Moeen U Ahmed (organiser)
- Sunil Krishna Dey Chowdhury (football)
- Lt (retd) Mohammad Amzad Hossain (athletics)
- Senior Warrant Officer (retd) Mohammad Lutfur Rahman (swimming)
- Mohammad Ruhul Amin (weightlifting)
- Khondokar Abul Hasan (volleyball)
- Brig General Mohammad Shawkat Hossain, PSC (bodybuilding)
- Mohammad Saidul Haque Sadi (table tennis)
- Syed Abdul Majid (cricket)
- Mohammad Jahangir Alam Chowdhury (kabaddi)

2009

- Dewan Shafiul Arefin Tutul (football and organiser)
- Badal Roy (football)
- Shamsul Alam Manju (football)
- Naimur Rahman Durjoy (cricket)
- Anjan Chowdhury Pintu (organiser)
- Shahed Ashgar Chowdhury (organiser)
- Hamida Begum (athletic and organiser)
- Shamim Ara Tolee (athletic)
- Mohammad Mohsin (hockey)
- Mostafa Kamal (volleyball)

2010

- Mashrafe Mortaza (cricket)
- Harun-ur-Rashid (swimming)
- Atiqur Rahman (shooting)
- Mahmuda Begum (athletics)
- Dewan Nazrul Hossan (gymnastics)
- Mizanur Rahman Manu (organiser)
- ASM Ali Kabir (organiser)
- Takbir Hossain (swimming)
- Farid Khan Chowdhury (athletics)
- Nelly Jesmin (athletics)
- Nipa Bose (athletics-mentally challenged)

2011

- Rowshan Ara Chobi (gymnastics)
- Kanchan Ali (boxing)
- Ashraf Ali (wrestling)
- Helena Khan Iva (volleyball)
- Khaled Mashud Pilot (cricket)
- Rabiul Islam Fatik Dutta (bodybuilding)
- Jumman Lusai (hockey)
- Kutubuddin Ahmed Chowdhury Aksir (organiser)
- Ashiqur Rahman Miku (organiser)
- Sheikh Kamal (sportsman/sports organiser)

2012

- Shakib Al Hasan (cricket)
- Mohammed Mohsin (football)
- Khurshid Alam Babul (football)
- Abdul Gaffar (football)
- Ashish Bhadra (football)
- Satyajit Das Rupu (football)
- Firoza Khatun (athletics)
- Nazia Akhter Juthi (badminton)
- Mamun-ur-Rashid (hockey)
- Nurul Alam Chowdhury
- Kazi Rajibuddin Ahmed Chapal (organiser)

2013

- Mozaffar Hossain Poltu (organiser)
- Kazi Mahtab Uddin Ahmed (organiser)
- Wing Cdr (Rtd) Mohyuddin Ahmed (organiser)
- Shamsul Haque Chowdhury (organiser)
- M Shahjahan Miji (swimmer)
- Rokeya Begum Khuki (athlete)
- Munira Morshed Khan Helen (table tennis player)
- Elias Hossain (footballer)
- Josna Akhtar (athlete)
- Bhola Lal Chowhan (squash player)
- Khaled Mahmud (cricketer)

2014

- Shamsul Bari (hockey player/organiser)
- Enayet Hossain Siraj (organiser)
- Fazlur Rahman Babul (organiser)
- Syed Shahed Reza (organiser)
- Imtiaz Sultan Johnny (footballer)
- Mohammad Ehsan Namim (hockey player)
- Kamrunnesa (Athlete)
- M Shamsul Islam (Swimmer)
- Murel Gomes (Athlete)
- Jobaidur Rahman Rana (Badminton player)

2015

- Professor Dr Sheikh Abdus Salam (organiser)
- M Ahmedur Rahman (gymnast/organiser)
- Ahmed Sajjadul Alam (organiser)
- Khaza Rahmatullah (hockey player)
- Mahtabur Rahman Bulbul (basketball player/organiser)
- Farhad Jesmin Lity (athlete)
- Barun Bikash Dewan (footballer)
- Rehana Jaman (swimmer)
- Mohammed Jewel Rana (footballer)
- Jesmin Akhter (multiple sports)
- Sheuli Akhtar Sathi (badminton player)

2016

- Mohammad Moniruzzaman (swimmer)
- AK Sarkar (organiser)
- Sultana Parveen Lovely (athlete)
- Shamim-al-Mamun (organiser)
- Arif Khan Joy (footballer)
- Khandaker Rakibul Islam (footballer)
- Mohammad Jalal Younus (organiser)
- M Tofazzal Hossain (athlete)
- Kazal Datta (weightlifter)
- M Tabiur Rahman Paloan (organiser)
- Z Alam (organiser)
- Abdur Razzak Sona Mia (hockey player)
- Habibul Bashar (cricketer)

2017

- Shahria Sultana (weightlifter)
- Awlad Hossain (karate)
- Wasif Ali (basketball player)
- Sheikh Bashir Ahmed Mamun (organiser)
- M Selim Mia (swimmer)
- M Khorshed Alam (organiser)
- Abu Yusuf (footballer)
- ATM Shamsul Alam (organiser)
- Rahima Khanm Juthi (athlete)
- Asaduzzaman Kohinoor (organiser)
- M Mahabub Harun (hockey player)

2018

- Farida Akter Begum (organiser)
- Josna Afros (athlete)
- M Rafiqul Ullah Akter Milon (organiser)
- Kazi Anwar Hossain (footballer)
- Shawkat Ali Khan Jahangir (organiser)
- Mir Robiuzzaman (gymnast)
- Mohammad Alamgir Alo (hockey player)
- Tayeb Shamsuzzaman (referee)
- Nibedita Das (swimmer)
- Mahmudul Hasan Rana (organiser)

2019

- Tanvir Mazhar Islam Tanna (organiser)
- Arun Chandra Chakma (organiser)
- Lt Gen (Rtd) Md Mainul Islam (organiser)
- Dipu Roy Chowdhury (cricketer)
- Kazi Nabil Ahmed (organiser)
- Enthekhabul Hamid Apu (organiser)
- Mahfuza Rahman Tania (swimmer)
- Farhana Sultana Shila (cyclist)
- Tutul Kumar Nag (hockey player)
- Mahbubur Rob (shuttler)
- Sadia Akter Urmi (table Tennis player)

2020

- Shaheed Lt Sheikh Jamal (organiser)
- Afzalur Rahman Sinha (organiser)
- Nazmul Abedeen Fahim (cricket coach)
- Mohammad Mohsin (footballer)
- M Mahbubul Ehsan Rana (hockey player)
- GM Abdullah Al Rakib (chess player)
- Nilufa Yeasmin (athlete)
- M Abdul Kader Smaran (shuttler)

== See also ==
- Sport in Bangladesh
