= Shamsul Alam Manju =

Bangladeshi footballer

Personal information
- Full name: Shamsul Alam Manju
- Date of birth: 14 March 1955 (age 71)
- Place of birth: Jamalpur, East Pakistan (present-day Bangladesh)
- Height: 1.75 m (5 ft 9 in)
- Position: Right-back

Senior career*
Years	Team	Apps	(Gls)
1970	Tejgaon Friends Union		
1972	BG Press SRC		
1972	Dhanmondi		
1972–1974	Abahani Krira Chakra		
1975–1978	Mohammedan		
1979–1983	Rahmatganj		
1984	Mohammedan		
1985	Wari		

International career
1975	Bangladesh U19		
1975–1982	Bangladesh		

Managerial career
- 1987: Rahmatganj
- 1990: Bangladesh U19
- * Club domestic league appearances and goals

Shamsul Alam Manju (Bengali: শামসুল আলম মঞ্জু; born 14 March 1955) is a Bangladeshi former professional football player and coach.

== Early life ==
Born in Jamalpur on 14 March 1955, Manju spent majority of his childhood in Tejgaon, Dhaka.

== Club career ==
=== Early career ===
Manju began his football career as a striker for Tejgaon Friends Union in the Dhaka Third Division Football League.

Following the 1971 Bangladesh Liberation War, Manju participated in the Independence Cup in 1972 as a guest player for the First Division club, Bangladesh Government Press SRC. However, he eventually joined Dhanmondi Club in the Dhaka Second Division Football League, playing as a right-winger.

=== Dhaka Abahani ===
In the same year, with league football canceled across all divisions, Manju joined Abahani Krira Chakra on the recommendation of Jahangir Shah. He won the Shahid Smriti Football Tournament held in Faridpur, playing as a center-back. In 1973, he permanently converted into a right-back while playing for Abahani and the following year won both his and the club's inaugural First Division League title, while playing alongside his older brother Monwar Hossain Nannu. Following a dispute with Abahani's team manager, Sheikh Kamal, over his salary, Manju departed the club.

On 9 November 1973, Manju represented Comilla XI in an exhibition match against Dinamo Minsk at Comilla Stadium during the Soviet club's tour of Bangladesh.

=== Mohammedan SC ===
In 1975, Manju joined Mohammedan Sporting Club and in the same year the Black and Whites won their first league title following the country's independence. Manju also made headlines during Mohammedan's 4–0 victory over his former club Abahani in the Dhaka Derby. He was reported to have passed the ball to Abahani's manager, Sheikh Kamal during the game, while shouting, "Khelo, khelo, akhon tomra khelo....amader char goal hoye geche ar koto khelbo?" (lit. 'Play, play, now you play. We have four goals, how much more will we play?').

In 1978, Manju was appointed captain of Mohammedan. During a league game against Dilkusha SC, he walked out, climbing the fence into the stands in protest. This was because club officials, not coach Ashraf Chowdhury, selected the starting eleven. Despite this, Manju faced no punishment due to pressure from Mohammedan fans. Ultimately, Mohammedan became league champions under his captaincy.

=== Rahmatganj MFS, Mohammedan & Wari Club ===
Manju departed Mohammedan for Rahmatganj MFS in 1979, claiming to have left the club for a higher salary. He captained the Old Dhaka club from 1980 to 1983. During his time there, he notably got into a physical altercation with Shahidur Rahman Shantoo during a league game against Mohammedan. In 1984, Manju returned to Mohammedan, however, left the club within a year due to another dispute with the officials. On 14 July 1985, he retired while playing for Wari Club during a league game against Mohammedan at the Dhaka Stadium.

== International career ==
Manju captained the Bangladesh U19 team during the 1975 AFC Youth Championship held in Kuwait. In the same year, he featured for the Bangladesh national team in the 1975 Merdeka Tournament. Manju initially retired after participating in the 1976 King's Cup in Bangkok, Thailand. However, he was later convinced to return to the national team for the 1978 Asian Games by coach Werner Bickelhaupt. He remained in the squad even though his brother, Monwar Hossain Nannu, and four other top names withdrew due to a captaincy conflict between Nannu and Shahidur Rahman Shantoo.

In 1982, Manju was appointed captain of the Bangladesh Red team, which was the senior national team during the Bangladesh President's Gold Cup. The team played with a strong defensive structure under coach Abdur Rahim, securing a goalless draw with Iran and losing by a single-goal margin against South Korea.

== Coaching career ==
Manju served as the team manager of Rahmatganj MFS in 1986, and the following year, he acted as coach-cum-manager of the club. In 1990, he was the head coach of the Bangladesh U19 team at the 1990 AFC Youth Championship qualifiers held in Dhaka, Bangladesh. The team failed to qualify for the main round, while notably claiming a 1–1 draw against South Korea U19 and recording a 4–1 victory over Pakistan U19.

== Personal life ==
Manju was the brother younger brother of the late Monwar Hossain Nannu, and played alongside him in defence for Abahani Krira Chakra in 1974. The two brothers notably captained two of the country's biggest teams in 1978, Manju marshalling Mohammedan SC while Nannu led Abahani.

In April 2016, Manju accused former teammate and Bangladesh Football Federation (BFF) president, Kazi Salahuddin, of being a serial gambler and also stated that he had submitted a complaint to FIFA about BFF's irregularities.

== Honours ==
Abahani Krira Chakra

- Dhaka First Division League: 1974

Mohammedan SC

- Dhaka First Division League: 1975, 1976, 1978
- DMFA Cup: 1984

Individual

- 1982 − Sports Writers Association's Best Footballer Award.
- 2009 − National Sports Award.

== Bibliography ==
- Dulal, Mahmud (2020). খেলার মাঠে মুক্তিযুদ্ধ (transl. Liberation war in the playground) (in Bengali). Bishhoshahitto Bhobon. ISBN 978-984-8218-31-0.
- Alam, Masud (2017). ফুটবলের গল্প ফুটবলারদের গল্প (transl. The story of football the story of footballers) (in Bengali). Bishhoshahitto Bhobon. ISBN 9789849134688.
