= Enayetur Rahman Khan =

Bangladeshi footballer

Enayetur
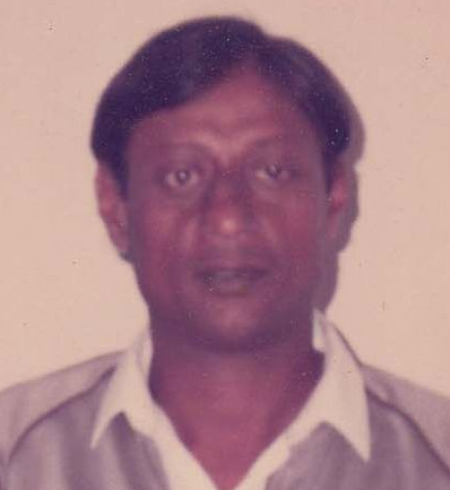
- Enayetur in 1987

Personal information
- Full name: Enayetur Rahman Khan
- Date of birth: 28 February 1951 (age 75)
- Place of birth: Dacca, East Bengal, Pakistan (present-day Dhaka, Bangladesh)
- Positions: Striker; attacking midfielder

Senior career*
Years	Team	Apps	(Gls)
1967	Fakirerpool		
1968–1970	EPG Press		
1970–1971	Victoria		(17)
1972–1973	BIDC		
1974	WAPDA		
1975–1977	BJMC		
1978–1980	Mohammedan		
1981	Rahmatganj		

International career
1971	Shadhin Bangla		
1973–1978	Bangladesh	17	(2)

Managerial career
- 1977: BJMC
- 1985: Mohammedan
- 1987: Brothers Union
- * Club domestic league appearances and goals

Enayetur Rahman Khan (Bengali: এনায়েতুর রহমান খান; born 28 February 1951) is a former Bangladeshi footballer who played as a striker. He holds the record of scoring the Bangladesh national team's first-ever international goal, which came in a 2–2 draw against Thailand during the country's inaugural competitive game in 1973. He scored a total of 90 goals in the First Division during his more than a decade-long career playing domestic football in Dhaka.

He was a member of the Shadhin Bangla football team that played exhibition matches across India to raise funds during the Bangladesh Liberation War in 1971. He represented the Bangladesh national team from 1973 to 1978. During his playing days, Enayetur was best known for his power shots and bad temper. He was considered to be one of the finest strikers in Bangladesh, and often drew comparison with Kazi Salahuddin in the 1970s.

== Club career ==
Enayetur was born on February 28, 1951, in Kaliganj, Dhaka. He started his football career in 1967, playing for Fakirerpool YMC in the Second Division. He later went onto have a short spell at East Pakistan Government Press in the First Division. In 1970, Enayetur joined Victoria SC, where he scored 17 goals in his debut year. His career came to a standstill, as he had to return to Kaliganj when the 1971 Liberation War commenced.

After the war was over Enayetur joined BIDC, in 1972. During the 1973 league deciding match against Dhaka Wanderers Club, Enayetur struck a brace to make BIDC the first league champions in independent Bangladesh, after the previous season ended unfinished. Early on in the game BIDC had fallen 2 goals behind, Enayetur scored a knuckleball free kick past Shahidur Rahman Shantoo, who was the country's top goalkeeper at the time. He went on to score another goal, and would have had an hattrick if his third goal was not ruled out for being offside. He later set up the winner scored by Wazed Gazi, as BIDC won the game 3–2. He spent the subsequent year with WAPDA SC before returning to BIDC who were then renamed as Bangladesh JMC (BJMC), and spent three more years at the club.

In 1978, Enayetur joined Mohammedan SC. He became the top scorer in the 1978 league with 13 goals, guiding his team to the league title. However, he did not complete his second season at the club as, Enayetur was banned for 5 years after physically attacking referee Dalil Khan during a First Division game against his former club Victoria in 1979. Nonetheless, the ban was later lifted by the Bangladesh Football Federation within months. Enayetur hung up his boots while playing for Rahmatganj MFS in 1981. Regarding his attack on the referee, Enayetur said (lit. 'I have done nothing to regret. Something needed to be done on the field that day').

== International career ==
During the start of the Bangladesh Liberation War, in 1971, Enayetur had returned to his hometown in Kaliganj as, the domestic league was postponed amidst the bloodshed. He and his teammates reached Agartala in India, while the war was ongoing. Mohammedan SC midfielder Mohammed Kaikobad took him to Virendra Club in Agartala, where Enayetur played in the Agartala First Division Football League. Eventually, when Bangladesh Sports Association officials from Kolkata came to Agartala to select the players, and Enayetur was nominated along with several others for the newly formed Shadhin Bangla football team. The team participated in the first match at Krishnanagar in Nadia, against the Nadia XI. The game ended in a 2–2 draw, and Enayetur was his team's second goal scorer.

On 13 February 1972, Enayetur took part in the first football match in the newly independent Bangladesh, representing the Bangladesh XI against President XI. The Bangladesh XI was made of former members of the Shadhin Bangla football team, nonetheless, the experienced team ended up losing 2–0. He also played for the Dhaka XI in a 1–0 win over visiting Mohun Bagan.

Enayetur was a late call up to the Bangladesh national football team squad when they participated in the 1973 Merdeka Cup in Malaysia. Two years after independence, this was the country's first ever international tournament. On 27 July 1973, Bangladesh took on Thailand, in their first official international match. During the game, Enayetur made history by scoring Bangladesh national team's first ever goal, as the game ended 2–2. Enayetur headed the ball in after meeting a chip from winger Sunil Krishna de Chowdhury. Regarding the goal, Enayetur stated (lit. 'I feel proud to be the first goal scorer of the nation. Sunil (Sunil Krishna Dey Chowdhury) of Cox's Bazar contributed a lot to my goal').

On 31 July 1973, Enayetur struck his second goal for his country by scoring against Kuwait, during the same Merdeka tournament. After that Enayetur was a common face in the national team, and took part in the 1975 edition of the Merdeka Cup, the 1976 King's Cup and retired from national duty after the 1978 Asian Games, due attacking a referee in the First Division.

== Career statistics ==
=== International goals ===
Scores and results list Bangladesh's goal tally first, score column indicates score after each Enayetur goal.

List of international goals scored by Enayetur Rahman Khan
No.	Date	Venue	Opponent	Score	Result	Competition	Ref.
1	27 July 1973	Stadium Merdeka, Kuala Lumpur, Malaysia	Thailand	1–1	2(5)–2(6)	1973 Merdeka Cup	
2	31 July 1973	Stadium Merdeka, Kuala Lumpur, Malaysia	Kuwait	1–1	1–2	1973 Merdeka Cup	

== Coachig career ==
In 1977, Enayetur was captain cum coach of Team BJMC. After retiring Enayetur officially took up coaching as a profession, he served 8 months as coach and manager of his former club Mohammedan SC, in 1985. In 1987, he was the coach of Brothers Union.

== Personal life and awards ==
In 1994, Enayetur left the country for the United States, and later settled in Canada with his family.

In recognition of his football career, he was awarded the Best Footballer of the Bangladesh Writers' Association in 1977 and the National Sports Award in 2004.

In November 2021, Enayetur returned to Bangladesh after 27 years abroad, in order to get his accreditation for participating in the Bangladesh Liberation War.

== Playing style ==
Enayetur was known for his shooting abilities, and could shoot powerfully with either leg. One of his goals against Rahmatganj MFS ended up tearing the net of the goalpost. Alongside his shooting, Enayetur was renowned for his headed goals and dribbles. A versatile attacker, Enayetur could operate as either a number 10 or as a playmaker.

== Honours ==
BIDC

- Dhaka First Division League: 1973

Mohammedan SC

- Dhaka First Division League: 1978, 1980

=== Awards and accolades ===
- 1977 − Sports Writers Association's Best Footballer Award
- 2004 − National Sports Award

=== Individual ===
- Dhaka First Division League top scorer: 1978

== Bibliography ==
- Mahmud, Dulal (2020). খেলার মাঠে মুক্তিযুদ্ধ (transl. Liberation war in the playground). Bishhoshahitto Bhobon. ISBN 978-984-8218-31-0.
- Mahmud, Noman (2018). ফুটবল পায়ে মুক্তির যুদ্ধ (transl. Liberation war fought by football) (in Bengali). Agamee Prakashani. ISBN 978-984-8218-31-0.
- Mahmud, Dulal (2018). আমাদের ফুটবলাররা (transl. Our Footballers) (in Bengali). Agamee Prakashani.
- Alam, Masud (2017). ফুটবলের গল্প ফুটবলারদের গল্প (transl. The story of football the story of footballers) (in Bengali). Bishhoshahitto Bhobon. ISBN 9789849134688.
- Tariq, T Islam (2025). মোহামেডান-আবাহনী ময়দানি লড়াই (transl. Mohammedan-Abahani battle field) (in Bengali). Annesha Prokashon. ISBN 978-984-99475-1-6.
