= Monwar Hossain Nannu =

Bangladeshi footballer (1948–2008)

- Monwar Hossain Nannu, 1970

Personal information
- Date of birth: 27 August 1948
- Place of birth: Jamalpur, East Bengal, Pakistan (present-day Bangladesh)
- Date of death: 16 February 2008 (aged 59)
- Place of death: Dhaka, Bangladesh
- Height: 1.76 m (5 ft 9 in)
- Positions: Attacking midfielder; centre-back

Youth career
- 1965: Azad B

Senior career*
Years	Team	Apps	(Gls)
1966	Tejgaon Friends Union		
1967	Dilkusha		
1968	EPG Press		
1969–1970	Wari Club		
1971–1973	Mohammedan		
1974–1979	Dhaka Abahani		
1980–1983	Rahmatganj		

International career
1973–1979	Bangladesh		(1)
- * Club domestic league appearances and goals

Monwar Hossain Nannu (Bengali: মনোয়ার হোসেন নান্নু; 27 August 1948 – 16 February 2008) was a Bangladeshi football player during the 1970s and early 1980s. Initially, he played as an attacking midfielder for Abahani Krira Chakra in the First Division. Following an injury in the mid-1970s, he moved to the central defender position and excelled in that position as well. He was a member of Bangladesh's first national football team.

== Club career ==
=== Early years ===
In the early sixties while still at school, Nannu practiced at the EPG Press field, and ex-Pakistan national team player Rashid Chunna who coached EPG Press (now BG Press) let Nannu train with the EPG Press football team, when there were not enough players present. In 1965, Nannu got an opportunity to play for the second string team of Azad Sporting Club in the Third Division. Nannu went on to mature by playing in the Second Division with Tejgaon Friends Union in 1966 and Dilkusha SC in 1967.

Nannu made his First Division debut for EPG Press in 1968, playing as a left-back against Dhaka Wanderers. In 1969, he moved to Wari Dhaka. He then played for Mohammedan Sporting Club as a defensive-midfielder after the 1971 Liberation War. Nannu marshalled the Mohammedan team alongside his brother, Shamsul Alam Manju. However, he was unable to win the league title during his three-year stay at the club.

=== Prominence ===
In 1974, he joined Abahani Krira Chakra. It was Sheikh Kamal who persuaded him to join Abahani, after Nannu had a row with his brother Manju at Mohammedan. The same year, Nannu, playing as an attacking midfielder, won his inaugural First Division title under Irish coach William Bill Hart's possession based football. Nannu played a big role in rebuilding Abahani after the dark episode of 1975, the Assassination of Sheikh Mujibur Rahman, which also claimed the life of one of the club's founder, Sheikh Kamal. After breaking his leg, Nannu stayed out of the game for two years, returning to football in 1977 and transitioning into a central-defender. He remained at Abahani until 1980, where he won the league title in 1977 and captained the club in 1978.

He is the finest midfielder of Bangladesh. His precision pass could find the gap through three players. He had the ability to attack from defence. He was a master tactician.

— Kazi Salahuddin, former Bangladesh captain.

In 1978, during a Dhaka Derby, Nannu was captain of Abahani while his brother Manju captained Mohammedan. At the time, the game was the most anticipated sports rivalry in the country. However, the two captains refused to shake hands at the beginning. Officials of both parties were worried about the matter, as a fight would have brought in a storm of criticism, and eventually the brothers were convinced into shaking hands before the game got underway. This incident later became a notable part of the country's football history. He ended his career while playing for Rahmatganj MFS in 1983.

== International career ==
Bangladesh's first national team coach, Sheikh Shaheb Ali, selected Nannu for the first Bangladesh national team in 1973. They participated in the Mardeka Cup held in Malaysia, and during the tournament Nannu scored against South Vietnam in a 1–1 draw. The tournament turned out to be his only foreign trip with the national team, as injury ruled him out for the 1975 Merdeka Cup. Nannu quit the national team in 1978, prior to the 1978 Asian Games in Bangkok, only to return to the squad during the 1980 AFC Asian Cup qualifiers held in Dhaka.

=== 1978 Asian Games controversy ===
In 1978, Bangladesh participated in Asian Games for the first time. Nannu, being the senior most player in the squad, was originally nominated as the captain for the Bangkok based event. However, the Bangladesh Football Federation changed their decision and goalkeeper Shahidur Rahman Shantoo from Mohammedan was appointed the new captain. Seven Abahani players: Rakibul Islam, Shafiul Arefin Tutul, Khurshid Alam Babul, Amalesh Sen, Kazi Salahuddin, Ashrafuddin Ahmed Chunnu and Nannu, withdrew from the team in protest. The much depleted Bangladesh team struggled in the tournament losing 1–0 to Malaysia and 3–0 to India. Following this incident, the federation generally tried to pick national team captains outside the two Dhaka giants for the next few years.

== Career statistics ==
=== International ===
Scores and results list Bangladesh's goal tally first.

#	Date	Venue	Opponent	Score	Result	Competition	Ref.
1	29 July 1973	Stadium Merdeka, Kuala Lumpur, Malaysia	South Vietnam	1–1	1–1	1973 Merdeka Tournament	

== Personal life and legacy ==
When I see a player of my younger brother's age dodging me and taking the ball in front of my eyes, and I can't do anything, I had to quit the game.

— Nannu on his retirement.

Nannu's younger brother Shamsul Alam Manju was a right-back. They played together at Mohammedan Sporting Club and Rahmatganj MFS. Nannu was married to Shahana Hossain.

He won the 1974 Bangladesh Sports Writers Association (BSWA) Footballer of the Year prize.

In 1998, Nannu received the National Sports Awards, but he could not claim it himself due to cancer. In the same year, a charity match for his treatment was held in Bangladesh, USA and Canada.

On 16 February 2008, Nannu died due to his cancer. In 2008, Sonali Otit Club introduced an award for the football referees and named it "Monwar Hossain Nannu Award".

== Honours ==
=== Club ===
Mohammedan Sporting Club

- Independence Cup: 1972

Abahani Krira Chakra

- Dhaka First Division League: 1974, 1977
- Liberation Cup: 1977

Individual

- 1974 − Sports Writers Association's Best Footballer Award
- 1998 − National Sports Award

== Bibliography ==
- Dulal, Mahmud (2020). খেলার মাঠে মুক্তিযুদ্ধ (transl. Liberation war in the playground) (in Bengali). Bishhoshahitto Bhobon. ISBN 978-984-8218-31-0.
- Alam, Masud (2017). ফুটবলের গল্প ফুটবলারদের গল্প (transl. The story of football the story of footballers) (in Bengali). Bishhoshahitto Bhobon. ISBN 9789849134688.
