= Sunil Krishna Dey Chowdhury =

Bangladeshi footballer

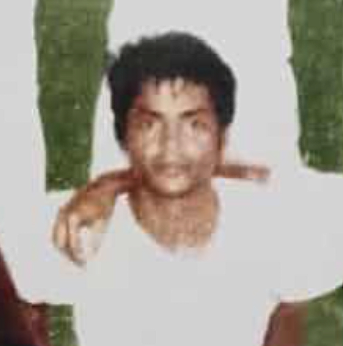
- Sunil with Bangladesh in 1973

Personal information
- Full name: Sunil Krishna Dey Chowdhury
- Date of birth: 31 May 1948 (age 78)
- Place of birth: Cox's Bazar, East Bengal, Pakistan (present-day Bangladesh)
- Position: Striker

Senior career*
Years	Team	Apps	(Gls)
1968	Azad		
1969–1975	WAPDA		
1976	PWD		

International career
1973	Bangladesh		
- * Club domestic league appearances and goals

Sunil Krishna Dey Chowdhury (Bengali: সুনীল কৃষ্ণ দে চৌধুরী; born 31 May 1948) is a former Bangladeshi footballer, coach, and sports organizer, who played as a striker. He was a member of the first Bangladesh national team.

== Club career ==
Sunil began his football career in the Chittagong First Division League in 1965, playing for Towns Club, Customs, and Port Trust in Chittagong. He then joined Azad Sporting Club in the Dhaka First Division League in 1968. Subsequently, Sunil took up a job at the Water and Power Development Authority in East Pakistan, where he spent the remainder of his career playing for both Dhaka and Chittagong-based WAPDA Sports Club. At the peak of his career, he rejected an offer to join Mohammedan SC as he was an employee of the parent corporation, WAPDA.

== International career ==
In 1973, Sunil was selected by coach Sheikh Shaheb Ali for the first Bangladesh national football team. He traveled with the team to participate in Malaysia's 1973 Merdeka Tournament, during which he assisted Bangladesh's first international goal, scored by Enayetur Rahman Khan, during the country's inaugural game against Thailand.

I feel proud to be the first goal scorer of the nation. Sunil (Sunil Krishna de Chowdhury) of Cox's Bazar contributed a lot to my goal.

— Enayetur Rahman Khan on scoring Bangladesh national football team's first ever goal.

== Post-playing career ==
Following his retirement from playing, Sunil coached WAPDA in the Chittagong First Division League. In 2006, Sunil retired from all administrative activities as the senior assistant director of WAPDA. In 2015, served as the general secretary of the National Sportsmen's Welfare Association in the Chittagong division.

== Bangladesh Liberation War ==
During the Bangladesh Liberation War in 1971, after Cox's Bazar came under the control of the Pakistan Army, Sunil crossed the border into Burma (now Myanmar) and took refuge in Maungdaw, Rakhine State. He was among a group of refugees from Cox's Bazar that included Professor Moshtaq Ahmad, Nur Ahmad, Member of the National Assembly (MNA) Osman Sarwar Chowdhury, Harun Ahmed Chowdhury, and several other political and social figures. Like many of the refugees, Sunil experienced financial hardship during his displacement. To support himself, he worked at a tea stall in the Four Mile area of Maungdaw during the day and, in the evenings, coached local boys in football, drawing on his experience as a footballer.

== Honours ==
Individual

- National Sports Award: 2008

== Bibliography ==
- Dulal, Mahmud (2020). খেলার মাঠে মুক্তিযুদ্ধ (transl. Liberation war in the playground) (in Bengali). Bishhoshahitto Bhobon. ISBN 978-984-8218-31-0.
- Alam, Masud (2017). ফুটবলের গল্প ফুটবলারদের গল্প (transl. The story of football the story of footballers) (in Bengali). Bishhoshahitto Bhobon. ISBN 9789849134688.
