= Khandoker Mohammad Nurunnabi =

Bangladesh Army Major General and football player

- খন্দকার মোহাম্মদ নুরুন্নবী
- Nurunnabi's picture taken from his book
- Born: 31 July 1946; Kishoreganj, Bengal, British India
- Died: 8 December 2016 (aged 70); Dhaka, Bangladesh
- Military career
- Allegiance: Bangladesh
- Branch: Bangladesh Army; Bangladesh Ansar; Bangladesh Rifles
- Service years: 1971–2001
- Rank: Major General
- Unit: East Bengal Regiment
- Commands: Sub-Commander of Sector – VIII; Sector Commander of BDR; Commandant of Army School of Physical Training and Sports; Commander of 111th Infantry Brigade; Director General of Bangladesh Ansar and Village Defence Party
- Conflicts: Bangladesh Liberation War
- Awards: National Sports Award
Association football career
- Position: Goalkeeper
Senior career*
Years	Team	Apps	(Gls)
1963–1964	Azad Sporting Club		
1965–1970	Mohammedan SC Dhaka		
International career
1970	Pakistan	1	(0)
- * Club domestic league appearances and goals

Khandoker Mohammad Nurunnabi (31 July 1946 – 8 December 2016) was a Bangladesh Army major general who served in the Bangladesh Liberation War in 1971. He was awarded the National Sports Awards in 2002 for his contribution to Bangladeshi football as a member of the Shadhin Bangla football team.

== Football career ==
In 1963, Nurunnabi began his football career by joining Azad Sporting Club, where he played until 1964. The following year, Nurunnabi fulfilled his dream of playing for Mohammedan SC, who were at the time the most popular team in East Pakistan. During his time with the Black & Whites, he played alongside a group of legendary players like Zakaria Pintoo, Pratap Shankar Hazra, Mohamed Kaikobad, and Golam Sarwar Tipu. He spent six years in Mohammedan, winning three First Division League titles and one Aga Khan Gold Cup (1968) trophy. While at Mohammedan, he got a job at the National Bank of Pakistan (now Sonali Bank).

In 1970, Nurunnabi became the last debutant from East Pakistan to represent the Pakistan national football team, as he travelled to Tehran, Iran, to participate in the 1970 RCD Cup. During the tournament, Nurunabbi played against both Iran and Turkey Amateurs. Nurunnabi is among only four goalkeepers from East Pakistan to represent the Pakistan national team, the others being Wajeed Ali Miazi, Manzur Hasan Mintu, and Shahidur Rahman Shantoo.

In 1971, after witnessing the massacre caused by Operation Searchlight, Nurunnabi, alongside Mohammedan SC teammate Pratap Shankar Hazra, crossed the border to Agartala, India, and then to Kolkata, where he joined the Shadhin Bangla football team. His only appearance for the Shadhin Bangla team came in their first game, which ended as a 2–2 draw against Nadia XI, on July 25. After the game, he met another one of his Mohammedan colleagues, Hafizuddin Ahmed, who helped Nurunnabi join the Bangladesh Liberation War.

== Military ==
After returning to East Pakistan from India with Hafizuddin Ahmed, Nurunnabi trained as a member of the Bangladesh Army, and was later ordered to take up arms at Kushtia of Sector Eight, under Major Muhammed Abul Manzur, as a sub-sector commander. He remained at his post until the war concluded.

Following the independence of Bangladesh, Nurunnabi decided to quit football and continue serving in the army. He was among the first commissioned officers of the Bangladesh Army after independence. During his tenure, he led three infantry battalions and served as the sector commander of the Bangladesh Rifles (now Border Guard Bangladesh) in Rangamati. He retired from the army in 2001, attaining the rank of major general, all while concurrently holding the position of director general of the Bangladesh Ansar and Village Defence Party.

== Personal life ==
In 2013, he released his autobiography, "ঢাকা স্টেডিয়াম থেকে সেক্টর আট" (lit. 'From Dhaka Stadium to Sector 8').

== Death ==
On 8 December 2016, Nurunnabi died after suffering a cardiac arrest at the Combined Military Hospital in Dhaka, at the age of 70.

== Bibliography ==
- Dulal, Mahmud (2014). পাকিস্তান জাতীয় দল বাঙালি খেলোয়াড় (transl. Bengali players in the Pakistan national team) (in Bengali). Bishhoshahitto Bhobon.
- Dulal, Mahmud (2020). খেলার মাঠে মুক্তিযুদ্ধ (transl. Liberation war in the playground). Bishhoshahitto Bhobon. ISBN 978-984-8218-31-0.
- Alam, Masud (2017). ফুটবলের গল্প ফুটবলারদের গল্প (transl. The story of football the story of footballers) (in Bengali). Bishhoshahitto Bhobon. ISBN 9789849134688.
- Mahmud, Noman (2018). ফুটবল পায়ে মুক্তির যুদ্ধ (transl. Liberation war fought by football) (in Bengali). Agamee Prakashani. ISBN 978-984-8218-31-0.
