= Mohammed Sheikh Taslim Uddin =

Bangladeshi footballer

Personal information
- Full name: Mohammed Sheikh Taslim Uddin
- Place of birth: Natore, East Pakistan
- Position: Midfielder

Senior career*
Years	Team	Apps	(Gls)
pre-1971	Dhaka Wanderers		

International career
1971	Shadhin Bangla Football Team		
- * Club domestic league appearances and goals

Mohammed Sheikh Taslim Uddin was a Bangladeshi footballer who played as a midfielder and was a member of the historic Shadhin Bangla Football Team formed during the Bangladesh Liberation War in 1971. He played club football for Dhaka Wanderers before the war and continued playing until his retirement in 1977. Like many of his teammates, he struggled with poverty and social neglect in the post-independence period.

== Early life ==
Taslim Uddin hailed from Natore District, Rajshahi Division, East Pakistan.

== Career ==
Uddin began his football career playing for Dhaka Wanderers, a prominent club in the Dhaka League, before the onset of the Liberation War.

In 1971, during the Bangladesh Liberation War, Uddin joined the Shadhin Bangla Football Team, a team created to raise awareness and funds for the cause of Bangladesh's independence. The funds generated from these matches were donated to the Mujibnagar government, and the team also helped to galvanize public support for the independence movement. The formation of the team was initiated by Saidur Rahman Patel, with backing from political leaders including Tajuddin Ahmad, the first Prime Minister of Bangladesh.

After retiring from football in 1977, Taslim Uddin returned to Natore and started a small business selling molasses and sugar. However, due to financial hardship, he had to shut the business down. He lived in economic difficulty, supported by his two sons—one a tractor driver at a sugar mill, and the other a clerk in the cooperative department. His post-retirement life, like that of many of his teammates, was marked by neglect and poverty.
