= Dilip Barua (footballer) =

Bangladeshi footballer (1946–2015

- Dilip Barua during his playing days

Personal information
- Full name: Dilip Kumar Barua
- Date of birth: 2 August 1946
- Place of birth: Cox's Bazar, Bengal Presidency, British India
- Date of death: 26 October 2015 (aged 69)
- Place of death: Chittagong, Bangladesh
- Position: Center-back

Senior career*
Years	Team	Apps	(Gls)
1964–1966	Young Star Club		
1967	Chittagong Customs		
1968–1982	Chittagong WAPDA		
1968–1969	Azad SC		
1970–1979	Dhaka WAPDA		
1975	Abahani Krira Chakra		

International career
1973	Bangladesh		

Managerial career
- 1981: Dhaka WAPDA
- –: Chittagong WAPDA
- –: Chittagong Mohammedan
- –: City Corporation
- * Club domestic league appearances and goals

Dilip Barua (Bengali: দিলীপ বড়ুয়া; 2 August 1946 – 26 October 2015) was a Bangladeshi football player who played as a center-back. He was a member of the first Bangladesh national football team in 1973.

== Early life ==
Dilip Barua was born on 2 August 1946, in Purva Gujra village of Cox's Bazar.

== Playing career ==
In 1964, he started his football career in Chittagong's First Division League with Young Star Club. From then till 1979, he played regularly as an essential player for established teams in Dhaka and Chittagong. He was a member of the Chittagong District football team from 1967 to 1980 and captained them from 1972 to 1980. In 1969–70, he represented the East Pakistan Combined University team in the National Football Championship held in Comilla.

He played for WAPDA SC in both the Chittagong and Dhaka First Division League. He played for the Chittagong-based side for almost 14 years starting from 1968, while being an employee of WAPDA. He was also the team's captain from 1972 to 1979. He was one of the four players selected from WAPDA by coach Sheikh Shaheb Ali for the first Bangladesh national football team in 1973 and went on to participate in Malaysia's Merdeka Cup that year. In 1975, he represented Abahani Krira Chakra in the Aga Khan Gold Cup. He captained Chittagong District to a runners-up position in the Sher-e-Bangla Cup in 1977.

== Coaching career ==
In 1981, Barua coached WAPDA in the Dhaka First Division League. He officially retired from playing in 1982 and turned to coaching. He served as the coach of the Chittagong District team, while also coaching Chittagong Mohammedan, WAPDA and City Corporation teams in the Chittagong Football league. In 2011, under his guidance, City Corporation became Chittagong First Division League champions.

== Death ==
On 26 October 2015, Dilip died after suffering from lung cancer.

== Honours ==
=== Manager ===
City Corporation

- Chittagong League: 2011
