= Fazle Sadain Khokon =

Bangladeshi footballer (1952–2024)

Personal information
- Date of birth: 20 October 1952
- Place of birth: Rajshahi, East Bengal, Pakistan (present-day Bangladesh)
- Date of death: 7 December 2024 (aged 72)
- Place of death: Dhaka, Bangladesh
- Positions: Defensive midfielder; center-back

Senior career*
Years	Team	Apps	(Gls)
1968	Azad SC		
1970–1972	Dhaka Wanderers		
1973	BIDC		
1974	WAPDA SC		
1975	BRTC SC		
1976	Dhaka Abahani		

International career
1971	Shadhin Bangla		
- * Club domestic league appearances and goals

Fazle Sadain Khokon (20 October 1952 – 7 December 2024) was a Bangladeshi footballer and member of the Shadhin Bangla football team, the national football team during the Bangladesh Liberation War.

== Biography ==
Fazle Sadain “Khokon” (20 October 1952- December 2024) was a renowned Bangladeshi footballer best known for his role in the Swadhin Bangla Football Team, which played a vital fundraising and awareness role during the 1971 Liberation War.

Khokon, originally from Boalia in Rajshahi, began his football career as a defender with Azad Sporting Club in 1968, later joining Dhaka Wanderers in 1970.

Following the country’s independence, he went on to play for teams such as the Water and Power Development Authority, Abahani Limited, the BRTC team, and the Rajshahi University team.

He retired from football in the late 1980s after sustaining a knee injury.

Khokon, who played as a midfielder, was a prominent member of the Swadhin Bangla Football Team.

He was admitted to Rajshahi Medical College Hospital following a serious illness on November 10. As his health condition worsened, he was transferred to Dhaka CMH on November 19.

Khokon died on 7 December 2024 at the Combined Military Hospital (Dhaka), where he had been brought for treatment from his hometown Rajshahi. Khokon is survived by his wife, two sons, two daughters, and many admirers who continue to honor his contributions to the nation’s football history. The Bangladesh Football Federation sent its condolences.
