= Khokon =

Khokon may refer to:

== People ==
- Fazle Sadain Khokon (1952–2024), Bangladeshi footballer
- A.M. Mahbub Uddin Khokon (born 1956), President of Bangladesh Supreme Court Bar Association
- Shahidul Islam Khokon (1957–2016), Bangladeshi filmmaker and producer
- Saif Hafizur Rahman Khokon (born 1958), Bangladeshi politician
- Imdadul Haque Khokon (born 1962), Bangladeshi choreographer
- Sayeed Khokon (born 1970), 1st Mayor of South Dhaka, Bangladesh
- Mohammad Shahiduzzaman Khokon (born 1971), Bangladeshi politician
- Khairul Kabir Khokon (born 1972), Bangladeshi politician
- Shohidul Islam Khokon (born 1995), Bangladeshi cricketer
- Abdur Rahman Khokon, Bangladeshi politician
- Abul Khair Abdullah Khokon Serniabat, 6th Mayor of Barisal, Bangladesh
- Anisuzzaman Khokon, Bangladeshi politician
- Badiul Alam Khokon, Bangladeshi film director
- Khan Mohammad Israfil Khokon, Bangladeshi politician

== Places ==
- Khokon, village in Manipur

== See also ==
- Bablu
- Pintu
- Tipu
