= Deutsche Tennis-Zeitung =

German sports magazine

Deutsche Tennis Zeitung (DTZ)
- Categories: Sports magazine
- Publisher: Schmidt & Dreisilker
- First issue: 1948
- Company: Schmidt & Dreisilker Group
- Country: Germany
- Based in: Berlin
- Language: German

Deutsche Tennis Zeitung (DTZ) was a German sports magazine devoted to tennis. It was first published as a print magazine in 1948. The magazine was bought by Schmidt & Dreisilker in 1981. In 2018 it ceased to trade under that name and was rebranded as tennis MAGAZIN.
