= Rafi Nasim =

Pakistani cricket administrator and writer

- Born: January 10, 1931; Lyallpur, British India (now Faisalabad, Pakistan)
- Died: 2020 (aged 88–89)
- Occupations: Cricket administrator and writer

Rafi Nasim (1931–2020) was a Pakistani cricket administrator and writer who served as a secretary of the Board of Control for Cricket in Pakistan (BCCP).

== Life ==
Born on 10 January 1931, in Lyallpur, British India (now Faisalabad, Pakistan), Nasim served two terms as the secretary of the Board of Control for Cricket in Pakistan (BCCP). During his tenure, he worked on administrative matters related to Pakistani cricket, including efforts to improve cricket infrastructure. He was dismissed from the BCCP in 1986, shortly before the 1987 Cricket World Cup, though his earlier work contributed to Pakistan’s preparations for co-hosting the event. He later focused on writing for sports magazines, newspapers, and websites. In 2003, Pakistan Cricket Board (PCB) issued him a legal notice of Rs 50 million for tarnishing the reputation of the PCB chairman by writing articles critical of him.

A brain hemorrhage in 2015 curtailed his writing. He died in 2020.
