= List of field hockey players who competed for more than one nation =

There have been some field hockey players who competed for more than one nation. These players belonged to India, Afghanistan, Pakistan, Bangladesh, Argentina, Germany and Spain.

It may be mentioned here that British India was divided into two independent countries India and Pakistan in 1947. Later in 1971, Bangladesh was created after attaining independence from Pakistan.

== Men's field hockey ==
Men's field hockey
Name	Team	Career	Match(es)	Goal(s)	Ref(s)
Sayed Yusuf	India	1928	4	?	
Sayed Yusuf	Afghanistan	1934	1	0	
Ali Dara	India	1936	2	4	
Ali Dara	Pakistan	1948	11	9	
Peter Paul Fernandes	India	1935–1936	?	?	
Peter Paul Fernandes	Pakistan	1948	?	?	
Latif-ur Rehman	India	1948	?	?	
Latif-ur Rehman	Pakistan	1950–1956	24	?	
Akhtar Hussain	India	1948	?	?	
Akhtar Hussain	Pakistan	1950–1956	12	?	
Abdus Sadeque	Pakistan	1969–1971	1	0	
Abdus Sadeque	Bangladesh	1978	5	0	
Ibrahim Saber	Pakistan	1971	?	?	
Ibrahim Saber	Bangladesh	1978	5	0	
Trevor Fernandes	India	1971–1973	?	?	
Trevor Fernandes	United States	1984	?	?	
Gonzalo Peillat	Argentina	2011–2019	153	176	
Gonzalo Peillat	Germany	2022–present	2	2	
Joaquin Menini	Argentina	2014–2019	110	?	
Joaquin Menini	Spain	2022–present	33	9	
Leon Hayward	Australia	2014–2015	13	0	
Leon Hayward	New Zealand	2019–present	49	0	
Scott Boyde	Australia	2016	7	1	
Scott Boyde	New Zealand	2023–present	35	7	
Tim Cross	Australia	2015–2016	8	1	
Tim Cross	Ireland	2023–present	46	3	
Iain Lewers	Ireland	2004–2008	88	?	
Iain Lewers	England/Great Britain	2011–2016	146	11	
Mark Gleghorne	Ireland	2004–2008	80	?	
Mark Gleghorne	England/Great Britain	2011–2020	162	?	
David Ames	Ireland	2008–2012	64	?	
David Ames	England/Great Britain	2015–present	119	4	
Ian Sloan	Ireland	2011–2012	21	?	
Ian Sloan	England/Great Britain	2015–present	118	5	
