= Sultana Kamal =

Sultana Kamal may refer to:

- Sultana Kamal (activist), a bangladeshi activist
- Sultana Kamal (athlete), a bangladeshi athlete
