= Firoza Khatun =

Bangladeshi sprinter

Personal information
- Native name: ফিরোজা খাতুন
- Nationality: Bangladeshi
- Born: January 4, 1969

Sport
- Sport: Track and field
- Events: Sprints, hurdling, long jump

Firoza Khatun (born 4 January 1969) is a Bangladeshi retired athlete. She became the fastest Bangladeshi woman 10 times from 1986 to 1996.

Khatun was awarded 2012 National Sports Award and 2024 Independence Award, the highest civilian award, by the government of Bangladesh for her contribution to sports.

== Career ==
Khatun started her career in Bangladesh Textile Mills Corporation in 1987 and retired in 1996 from Bangladesh Jute Mills Corporation.

She competed at the 1991 and 1993 World Championships.

At the national level, Khatun won gold medals in 200m sprint and 100m hurdles and a silver medal from high-jump and long-jump events.

== Personal life ==
Khatun lives in Mymensingh with her daughter, Afnan Rozana (aged 15–16).
