= Khurshida Aktar Khushi =

Bangladesh's first female gymnast

- খুরশিদা আক্তার খুশি
- Full name: Khurshida Aktar Khushi
- Born: Chittagong, Bangladesh
- Spouse: Mir Rabiuzzaman

Gymnastics career
- College team: University of Dhaka

Khurshida Akhtar Khushi is a Bangladeshi sportsperson. She was a national champion in gymnastics and judo in Bangladesh, while active in competition. She is the first female gymnast in Bangladesh. She won the National Sports Award in 2004 for her contribution to sports. Her image was featured on the cover of the maiden issue of the first sports biweekly magazine, Krirajagat, in Bangladesh.

== Personal life ==
Khurshida Akhtar was born in Chittagong. Her ancestral home is in Dhaka. Her husband Mir Rabiuzzaman was a national gymnastics champion of Bangladesh. She is an alumna of University of Dhaka While still a player, she earned her master's degree in sociology. Khurshida has a daughter with Mir. Her eyesight was reduced due to a road accident.

== Achievements ==
Khurshida Akhtar won three national individual titles in judo between 1979 and 1988. She also won the 'Japan Cup' judo title three times. She was the first female gymnast in Bangladesh and won the National Sports Award in 2004 for her contribution to judo.
