= Krirajagat =

Bangladeshi sports magazine

- First issue of Krirajagat featuring Khurshida Aktar Khushi
- Native name: ক্রীড়াজগত
- Editor: Dulal Mahmud (2 November 1996 - present)
- Former editors: Tawfiq Aziz Khan; Badiuzzaman; Shamsuddin Mehedi
- Categories: sports magazine
- Frequency: biweekly
- Publisher: National Sports Council
- First issue: July 20, 1977; 48 years ago
- Country: Bangladesh
- Based in: Dhaka
- Language: Bangla

Krirajagat (Bengali: ক্রীড়াজগত, transl. The World of Sports) is a fortnightly sports magazine that serves as the official national sports periodical of Bangladesh. Published under the auspices of the National Sports Council. The inaugural issue of Krirajagat was released on 20 July, 1977. Since its inception, the magazine has played a pivotal role in preserving rare statistics, archival photographs, and in-depth narratives related to the evolution of sports in the country. It is widely regarded as a vital historical repository for researchers, enthusiasts, and sports historians alike. Since 2017, each 64-page issue of Krirajagat has been made available not only in print but also through digitize format.

== History ==
The first issue of Krirajagat was published on 20 July 1977, funded by the National Sports Regulatory Board, the predecessor of the National Sports Council. The cover of the inaugural issue, featured a photograph of gymnast Khurshida Aktar Khushi. In its initial years, the magazine was printed on newsprint. The publication later adopted white offset printing, followed by the introduction of full-color print editions. Originally comprising 48 pages, the magazine was later expanded to a 64-page format. In 2017, on the occasion of its 40th anniversary, Krirajagat began offering a digitized version alongside its print edition.

The founding editor of Krirajagat was Tawfiq Aziz Khan. He was succeeded by a series of notable editors, including Badiuzzaman and Shamsuddin Mehedi. Since 2 November 1996, Dulal Mahmud has served as the magazine’s fourth and current chief editor.

== Special Features ==
Since its inception, the magazine has preserved comprehensive information, history, photographs, and statistics related to the sports of Bangladesh, serving as a primary source of sports-related quotations. Many have had started their career in sports journalism through this publication. The magazine pioneered the practice of publishing articles about the personal lives of Bangladeshi athletes along with their colorful photographs. While daily newspapers often do not publish the complete results of various sports events, Krirajagat presents results and historical records in detail, including statistics.

== Regular Sections ==
In addition to various sports reports and detailed results, quizzes and the “Maath-Gallery-Stadium” feature are among the regular sections of the biweekly magazine.
