= Anwar Hossain (footballer, born 1935) =

Bangladeshi footballer and manager

- Anwar, post-retirement

Personal information
- Full name: Anwar Hossain
- Date of birth: 1935
- Place of birth: Dhaka, Bengal, British India (present-day Bangladesh)
- Date of death: February 1997 (aged 61–62)
- Place of death: Dhaka, Bangladesh
- Position: Center-forward

Senior career*
| Years | Team | Apps | (Gls) |
| 1949–1953 | Azad | | |
| 1954–1955 | EBG Press | | |

Managerial career
- 1977: Bangladesh U20
- 1979: Bangladesh
- * Club domestic league appearances and goals

Anwar Hossain (Bengali: আনোয়ার হোসেন; 1935 – February 1997) was a Bangladeshi football player and coach. He spent most of his playing career as a center-forward for Azad SC. He served as joint head coach of the Bangladesh national team, alongside Anjam Hossain, during the 1980 AFC Asian Cup qualification held in Dhaka in March 1979.

== Early life ==
Anwar was born in 1935 Dhaka, British India.

== Playing career ==
Anwar began his football career while studying at Armanitola Government High School between 1948 and 1952. In 1952, he helped the school win the Inter-School Competition in Dhaka. That same year, he represented City XI in the Inter-District Football Tournament and played in an exhibition match against the Pakistan national football team in Dhaka. He continued playing while studying at St. Gregory's College from 1953 to 1955.

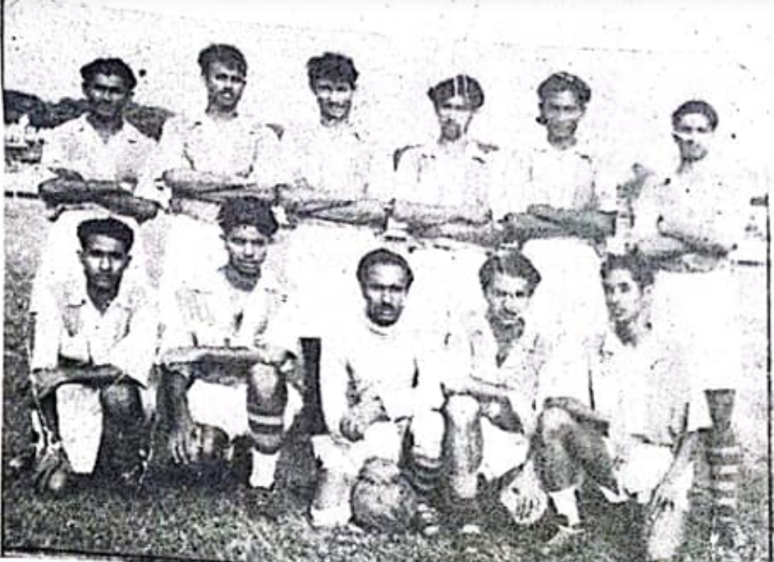
Anwar (standing first from left), with Azad in 1953

Anwar was a founding general secretary of Azad SC and joined the club when it entered the Second Division of the Dhaka Football League in 1949. Following the club's promotion, he made his First Division debut in 1951, scoring eight league goals. In 1952, he scored 22 goals to finish as the league's second-highest scorer behind Rashid Chunna. On 16 May 1952, he scored all seven goals in Azad's 7–0 victory over Mohammedan in a First Division match. In the same year, he represented East Pakistan Whites in the National Football Championship held in Dhaka.

In 1953, he was the league's top scorer with 49 goals as Azad finished runners-up in the league. In the same year, he won the Independence Day Tournament representing Dhaka University by defeating E.B. Railway 2–1 in the third replayed final. The team's forward line consisted entirely of Azad players: Anwar, Anjam Hossain, Shah Alam, Firoz, and SA Jamman Mukta.

In 1954, Anwar joined EBG Press as a player-cum-employee and helped the club finish as league runners-up that season. However, he retired the following year due to a knee injury.

== Coaching career ==
Anwar returned to Azad following retirement, working as both a coach and organizer. He was part of the club's coaching panel during their 1958 First Division triumph. Following the independence of Bangladesh, he received training as a football coach in East Germany in 1973 and later joined the National Sports Council.

Anwar served as head coach of the Bangladesh U20 team at the 1977 AFC Youth Championship in Tehran. In 1979, he was appointed joint head coach of the Bangladesh national team, alongside former Azad teammate Anjam Hossain, for the 1980 AFC Asian Cup qualification tournament, which was held in Dhaka from 1 to 7 March 1979. Bangladesh, grouped with Qatar and Afghanistan, finished second in the group and qualified for the main tournament, recording one win, two draws, and one defeat. Their 3–2 victory over Afghanistan was the national team's second-ever international win and its first on home soil. However, Anwar and Anjam did not manage the team at the main tournament in Kuwait.

== Death ==
Anwar died in February 1997.

== Honours ==
Dhaka University

- Independence Day Tournament: 1953

Individual

- 1953 − Dhaka First Division League top scorer

== See also ==
- List of Bangladesh national football team managers
