= Lutfor Rahman (footballer) =

Bangladeshi footballer (1951-2020)

Lutfor Rahman (born 1951) was a footballer of the Shadhin Bangla Football Team, the first national football team of Bangladesh, during the Bangladesh Liberation War. He played matches around India to raise funds and awareness for the Bangladesh Liberation War.

== Early life ==
Rahman was born in 1951 in Jessore District.

== Career ==
Rahman played for the Jashore District Football Team and Jashore District Hockey Team from 1965 to 1975. He joined the Wari Club Dhaka in 1969. He joined the Shadhin Bangla Football Team at the start of Bangladesh Liberation War in 1971. He was the general secretary of the Bangladesh Krira Somity of the Mujibnagar government.

Rahman worked as a contractor in Jessore District.

== Personal life ==
Rahman was married to Majeda Rahman. They had two children, a daughter and a son.

== Death ==
Rahman had a brain stroke in 2018. Prime Minister Sheikh Hasina provided half a million cash and 2.5 million in savings certificates for his treatment to his wife Majeda Rahman. He died on 29 June 2020. After his funeral at the Sammiloni High School, he was buried at Talbaria in his family graveyard.
