= Jumman Lusai =

Bangladeshi field hockey player

Personal information
- Born: 12 August 1955 Sylhet, East Pakistan (present-day Bangladesh)
- Died: 18 January 2015 (aged 59) Dhaka Bangladesh
- Height: 1.75 m (5 ft 9 in)

Sport
- Sport: Field hockey
- Position: Defender Full-back
Senior career
Years	Team	Caps	Goals
1978–1984	Bangladesh Police	-	-
1985–1996	Abahani Ltd. Dhaka	-	-
National team
Years	Team	Caps	Goals
1982–1989	Bangladesh		-
Coaching career
- –: Abahani Ltd. Dhaka

Jumman Lusai (Bengali: জুম্মন লুসাই; 12 August 1955 – 18 January 2015) was a Bangladeshi field hockey player who represented the Bangladesh national field hockey team. He is considered to be one of the greatest hockey players to have represented Bangladesh and was also selected in the World XI hockey team in 1989.

== Career ==
Jumman began his hockey career with Police AC in the First Division Hockey League in 1978. He was eventually selected in the Bangladesh national hockey team for the 1982 Asian Games in New Delhi, India.

Jumman joined Abahani Limited in 1985, and won the top-division hockey league in both 1989 and 1993.

In 1985, during the 1985 Hockey Asia Cup held in Dhaka, he made history as the first Bangladeshi to score a hat-trick in international hockey, scoring all three goals from penalty corners against Iran. Bangladesh won the encounter 3–1. The following year, he represented Bangladesh in the 1986 Asian Games. He retired from international duty following his participation in the 1989 Hockey Asia Cup.

Jumman is the only Bangladeshi hockey player who had the fortune of playing in the World XI in 1989.

He played in the domestic league with Abahani until 1996, and eventually took up coaching duty at the club following his retirement. He was also involved with football, and was the head coach of Sylhet's Chaturanga JS at the 2000 National Football League.

== Personal life ==
Jumman comes from a sporting family with six brothers and one sister. His brother, Thanglura Lusai, played both hockey and football for the Bangladesh Police and major clubs in Sylhet, and was also part of the East Pakistan team. Chemam Lusai, the third eldest, and Jaudua Lusai, the fourth eldest, played for various football and hockey clubs in Sylhet. Chemam was also a football coach at Sylhet's Eleven Star Club, a club with deep connections to his family.

The youngest brother, Joubel Lusai, was an archery coach and died on 3 March 2022. His elder brother, Dandan Lusai played hockey for Bangladesh Police and represented Bangladesh at the 1982 Asian Games. Their only sister, Marian Chowdhury, was a notable athlete in Sylhet and later served as the General Editor of the Sylhet Divisional Organization and the District Women's Sports Association.

His cousin Rama Lusai represented both the Bangladesh national hockey team and Bangladesh national football team in the lae 70s.

== Death ==
On 18 January 2015, Jumman died while undergoing treatment at Bangabandhu Sheikh Mujib Medical University. He was reported to have suffered both a brain stroke and a cardiac arrest. His funeral was held in his home district of Sylhet. Jumman left behind a wife and three children residing in Mizoram, India.

== Honours ==
Abahani Limited Dhaka

- First Division Hockey League/Premier Division Hockey League: 1989, 1993

Individual

- 2011 − National Sports Awards.
