= Tanveer Mazhar Islam Tanna =

Tanveer Mazhar Islam Tanna is a Bangladeshi sports organizer and manager of the Shadhin Bangla football team (Free Bengal Football Team), the national team during the Bangladesh Liberation War. He was a vice-president of the Bangladesh Cricket Board.

== Early life ==
Tanna completed his SSC at PAF Shaheen College, Dhaka (now BAF Shaheen College Dhaka) in 1967. He was a school friend of Sheikh Kamal, sports organizer and son of Sheikh Mujibur Rahman.

== Career ==
Tanna was the Shadhin Bangla football team manager during the Bangladesh Liberation War.

In 1998, Tanna was the vice-president and the member-secretary of the ticket and seating subcommittee of the Bangladesh Cricket Board.

In December 2018, the Bangladesh Football Federation accorded a reception to the members of the Shadhin Bangla football team including Tanna. In 2019, he was awarded the National Sports Awards by Prime Minister Sheikh Hasina. He attended the inauguration of a nameplate for Swadhin Bangla Football Team at the Bangladesh Football Federation in December 2023.

== Personal life ==
Tanna is married to Tabassum.
