= Saidur Rahman Patel =

Bangladeshi footballer (died 2024)

Personal information
- Full name: Saidur Rahman Patel
- Date of birth: October 7, 1951
- Place of birth: Keraniganj, Bangladesh
- Date of death: August 8, 2024 (aged 72)
- Place of death: USA

Saidur Rahman Patel was a Bangladeshi football player and organizer of the Shadhin Bangla football team. He was born in 1951 at Keraniganj.

== Career ==
Patel played football for the East End Club.

Patel was the organizer of the Shadhin Bangla football team (Free Bangla football team) during the Bangladesh Liberation War. The team represented the Mujibnagar government and would become the Bangladesh National football team after the independence of the country. The key organizers of the team were Patel, Lutfor Rahman, first secretary of the Bangladesh Krira Samity, and Ali Imam. He also fought in the Bangladesh Liberation War.

Bangladesh Football Federation President Kazi Mohammad Salahuddin hosted a reception of the Shadhin Bangla football team in 2018 which Patel attended.

In December 2021, Patel attended the 50th anniversary reception of the Shadhin Bangla football team by Bangladesh Football Federation. He was awarded the Sheikh Kamal National Sports Council Award-2022 by Prime Minister Sheikh Hasina. The movie, Damal, is about the Shadin Bangla Football Team.

== Death ==
Patel died on 8 August 2024 in the United States from Cancer. Kazi Mohammad Salahuddin, President of the Bangladesh Football Federation, expressed shock over his death.
