= Romizuddin Ahmed =

Bangladeshi footballer (1910–unknown)

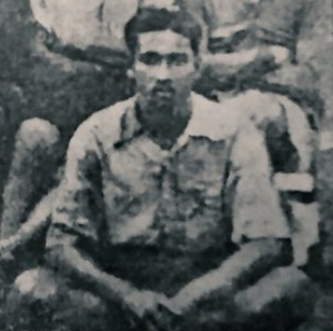
- Romizuddin with East Bengal in 1932

Personal information
- Full name: Romizuddin Ahmed
- Date of birth: 1910
- Place of birth: Comilla, British India
- Date of death: Unknown
- Place of death: Bangladesh
- Positions: Centre-forward; full-back

Senior career*
Years	Team	Apps	(Gls)
- Dhaka Madrasa
1927	Muslim SC		
- Dhaka University
1931	Kolkata Mohammedan		
1931–1935	East Bengal		
- * Club domestic league appearances and goals

Romizuddin Ahmed (Bengali: রমিজউদ্দিন আহমেদ; 1910 – unknown), also known as Haji Romiz or simply Romiz, and alternatively spelled Rameez, was a prominent 20th-century footballer, hockey player, athlete, and politician from Bengal, British India and later Bangladesh. He is best known for his time as a footballer for East Bengal FC.

== Early life ==
Ahmed was born in 1910 in the village of Babutipara in Muradnagar, Tipperah, Bengal (now Comilla District, Bangladesh). He was the fourth among six brothers and three sisters. He began his education at Dhaka Madrasa, later studying at an Islamia Intermediate College. He subsequently gained admission to Dhaka University and was a student of Muslim Hall.

== Sports career ==
Romiz began playing in the Dhaka First Division Football League with Dhaka Madrasa while still a student at the institution. He later represented the team during their triumphs in both the First Division and inter-school tournaments. In 1927, he competed in the Ronaldshay Shield with the newly formed Muslim Sporting Club. In the same year, Romiz won seven gold and two silver medals across nine disciplines at the Bengal Olympics held in Dhaka.

He was also a regular member of the Dhaka University hockey and football team, and emerged as the champion of the university's annual sports competition in 1932, scoring a record 40 points. The hall championship cup was also won by Romiz's Muslim Hall. His most significant achievement with the university's athletic team came in 1929, (Note: Although some sources cite that the tournament was held in 1927 or 1929, a news report published by Amrita Bazar Patrika on 23 September 1943 confirms that Dhaka University won the inaugural Inter-University Football Tournament in 1929.) when Dhaka University defeated Calcutta University in the final of the inaugural Sir Sultan Ahmed Shield Inter-University Football Tournament, held in Patna, Bihar. The match was decided by a solitary goal scored by Romiz.

In 1931, he represented Kolkata Mohammedan in a tournament held in Lucknow, Uttar Pradesh. In the same year, he joined East Bengal FC in Calcutta, where he played for five seasons as a centre-forward. In 1932, he played as a makeshift full-back following an injury in the East Bengal backline. Following his graduation from Dhaka University, he was appointed assistant director of the Physical Education Department, a position he resigned from after the partition of India.

== Political career ==
Ramiz was elected twice as an MP from his own constituency, Comilla, on behalf of the United Front.

== Personal life ==
Tamizuddin Ahmed, Ramiz's younger brother, was also a footballer and played in the Calcutta League. His nephew Shah Alam was also a renowned footballer of Mohammedan SC of Dhaka. In 1978, Ramiz received the National Sports Awards.

== Honours ==
Dhaka University

- Inter-University Football Tournament: 1929

Individual

- National Sports Awards: 1978
