= Nazia Akhter Juthi =

Bangladeshi badminton player

Personal information
- Born: Bangladesh
- Years active: 1986–1996

Sport
- Country: Bangladesh
- Sport: Badminton
- Event: Women's singles, Women's doubles, Mixed doubles

Nazia Akhter Juthi is a Bangladeshi badminton player and recipient of the National Sports Award of Bangladesh.

== Career ==
Nazia Akhter Juthi won her first two national titles in Bangladesh in 1986, and she was successful in both the women's single and mixed. Six further titles won until 1996. She was once successful in the women's single, three times in the double and four times in the mixed.

She was awarded National Sports Awards in 2012. She received the award from Prime Minister Sheikh Hasina for her contribution to badminton in Bangladesh.
