= Khandaker Rakibul Islam =

Bangladeshi footballer

Personal information
- Full name: Khandaker Rakibul Islam Rakib
- Date of birth: 1 January 1956 (age 70)
- Place of birth: Jashore, East Bengal, Pakistan (present-day Bangladesh)
- Height: 1.68 m (5 ft 6 in)
- Position: Left-back

Senior career*
Years	Team	Apps	(Gls)
1973–1978	Mohammedan		
1979–1980	Abahani Krira Chakra		
1981–1983	BJMC		
1984–1986	Rahmatganj		
1987–1990	BJMC		

International career
1975	Bangladesh U19		
1976–1981	Bangladesh		
- * Club domestic league appearances and goals

Khandaker Rakibul Islam (Bengali: খন্দকার রকিবুল ইসলাম; born 1 January 1956), better known as Rakib, is a retired Bangladeshi footballer who played as a left-back.

== Club career ==
In 1973, Rakib debuted for Mohammedan SC in the First Division, later winning the league in 1975 and 1976. In 1977, he became captain during the Aga Khan Gold Cup at age 22. In 1978, he joined rivals Abahani Krira Chakra. Although he didn't win the league there, his performance in the 1979 Aga Khan Gold Cup stood out. In 1981, he joined defending champions Team BJMC but left when they were relegated in 1983. He retired while playing for BJMC in 1990.

== International career ==
In 1975, Rakib joined the Bangladesh U19 squad for the 1975 AFC Youth Championship. He debuted for the senior team in the 1976 King's Cup in Bangkok. Coach Werner Bickelhaupt included him in the squads for the 1978 Asian Games and 1980 AFC Asian Cup qualifiers. However, Rakib and five other Abahani players boycotted the 1978 Asian Games due to the removal of veteran defender Monwar Hossain Nannu as captain. He returned to the team in 1979 for the AFC qualifiers and served as Bangladesh's vice-captain in the 1980 AFC Asian Cup in Kuwait.

== Post-playing career ==
Since retiring, Rakib has worked for the Bangladesh Football Federation development committee and most recently in 2021, when he assisted a talent hunt program for the BFF Elite Football Academy. He currently serves as the team manager of the academy which participates in the Bangladesh Championship League.

== Honours ==
Mohammedan SC

- Dhaka First Division League: 1975, 1976

=== Awards and accolades ===
- 2016 − National Sports Award.
