= Aminul Islam Suruz =

Bangladeshi footballer and freedom fighter

Aminul Islam Suruj (c. 1950 – 29 July 2024) was a Bangladeshi footballer and freedom fighter. He was a member of the historic Shadhin Bangla Football Team, the first national football team of Bangladesh, which played a crucial role during the Bangladesh Liberation War in 1971 by raising international awareness and funds for the war effort.

Suruj played for top domestic clubs including Abahani and Mohammedan Sporting Club during his professional career. Known for his dedication to both his nation and the sport, he remained a respected figure in Bangladesh’s football community.

Suruj died at the age of 74 on 29 July 2024 at a hospital in Dhaka due to complications related to old age and kidney disease. The Bangladesh Football Federation (BFF) and the broader football fraternity mourned his passing and paid tribute to his contributions to both the sport and the country's independence movement.
