= Sheikh Monsur Ali Lalu =

Bangladeshi footballer

Sheikh Monsur Ali Lalu was a player of the Shadhin Bangla Football Team, the first national football team of Bangladesh, during the Bangladesh Liberation War. In 2013, the team was awarded the Independence Day Award, the highest civilian award of Bangladesh. He died on 18 December 1971 two days after the independence of Bangladesh.
