= Dewan Shafiul Arefin Tutul =

Bangladeshi footballer and cricket administrator

Shafiul Arefin Tutul
Personal information
- Full name: Dewan Shafiul Arefin Tutul
- Date of birth: 1 March 1960 (age 66)
- Place of birth: Manikganj, East Pakistan (present-day Bangladesh)
- Position: Right wing-back

Senior career*
| Years | Team | Apps | (Gls) |
| 1974 | Dhanmondi Club | | |
| 1975–1980 | Dhaka Abahani | | |
| 1981–1982 | Brothers Union | | |
| 1983–1986 | Dhaka Abahani | | |
| 1987 | Rahmatganj MFS | | |
| 1988–1992 | Dhaka Abahani | | |

International career
| 1978 | Bangladesh U19 | | |
| 1976–1985 | Bangladesh | | |
Medal record
Representing Bangladesh
South Asian Games
| Silver medal – second place | 1985 |
- * Club domestic league appearances and goals

Dewan Shafiul Arefin Tutul (Bengali: দেওয়ান শরিফুল আরেফিন টুটুল; born 1 March 1960) is a former Bangladeshi footballer and the former Youth and Sports Affairs Secretary of Bangladesh Awami League.

== Club career ==
Tutul began his career as a striker in the Dhaka Second Division League with Dhanmondi Club in 1974.

He was later invited to join the junior team of Abahani Krira Chakra by Ali Imam. He soon shifted to defence playing alongside Monwar Hossain Nannu and eventually became a right full back who frequently made overlaps. Thus, he is regarded as the first attacking full back in Dhaka football.

He became the vice-captain of Abahani in 1979 and the captain in 1980; however, he departed the club the following year after a fallout with the officials. He won six Dhaka First Division League titles during three stints with Abahani. He also lifted the Aga Khan Gold Cup with Brothers Union. In his second stint at Abahani, he was handed club captaincy in 1984. Tutul also impressed at continental level, scoring a brace during Abahani's 8–1 victory over Club Valencia in the 1985–86 Asian Club Championship.

He officially retired from football on 7 June 1992, during the last league game between Abahani and Mohammedan SC.

== International career ==
He represented the Bangladesh U19 team at the 1977 AFC Youth Championship in Tehran. Tutul previously made his senior international debut during the 1976 King's Cup in Bangkok. He also represented Bangladesh during the 1980 AFC Asian Cup qualifiers, 1984 South Asian Games and the 1985 South Asian Games.

== Honours ==
Abahani Limited Dhaka

- Dhaka First Division League: 1977, 1983, 1984, 1985, 1989–90, 1992
- Federation Cup: 1985, 1986, 1988
- Independence Cup: 1990
- Liberation Cup: 1977
- Sait Nagjee Trophy: 1989
- Azmiri Begum Gold Cup: 1990
- BTC Club Cup: 1991

Brothers Union

- Aga Khan Gold Cup: 1981–82

Bangladesh

- South Asian Games Silver medal: 1985

Individual

- 2009 − National Sports Award.

== Personal life and political career ==
In the early 1980s, Tutul played the leading role in a BTV drama depicting the story of a young footballer. The hero comes from a remote area of the country, but becomes a top footballer in Dhaka, before an injury ends his career abruptly. Nupur, a leading actress, played the role of the heroine.

In 2001, Tutul was nominated by Awami League to contest the national elections from Manikganj-4 but lost the election to Bangladesh Nationalist Party candidate Shamsul Islam Khan.

In 2009, he was awarded the National Sports Award.

Tutul served as the youth and sports affairs secretary of Bangladesh Awami League. He served as a Director of Bangladesh Cricket Board. In April 2016, he received a nomination for the post of Vice-President of Bangladesh Football Federation. He is the councilor of Dhaka Division unit of Bangladesh Cricket Board.

== Bibliography ==
- Dulal, Mahmud (2020). খেলার মাঠে মুক্তিযুদ্ধ (transl. Liberation war in the playground) (in Bengali). Bishhoshahitto Bhobon. ISBN 978-984-8218-31-0.
- Alam, Masud (2017). ফুটবলের গল্প ফুটবলারদের গল্প (transl. The story of football the story of footballers) (in Bengali). Bishhoshahitto Bhobon. ISBN 9789849134688.
