= Dewan Mohammad Sirajuddin Siru =

Bangladeshi association football player and manager

Personal information
- Full name: Dewan Mohammad Sirajuddin Siru
- Date of birth: 1 January 1951
- Place of birth: Dhaka, East Bengal, Pakistan (present-day Bangladesh)
- Date of death: 3 April 2013 (aged 62)
- Place of death: Dhaka, Bangladesh
- Position: Centre-back

Senior career*
Years	Team	Apps	(Gls)
1966–1967	East End Boys		
1968	Farashganj SC		
1969	Pakistan Sporting		
1970–1972	PWD SC		
1973	Dilkusha SC		
1974	Victoria SC		
1975	East End Club		
1976–1977	Victoria SC		

International career
1971	Shadhin Bangla		
- * Club domestic league appearances and goals

Dewan Mohammad Sirajuddin (Bengali: দেওয়ান মোহাম্মদ সিরাজউদ্দিন; 1 Januar 1951 – 3 April 2013), known by his nickname Siru, was a Bangladeshi football player who represented the Shadhin Bangla football team, during the Bangladesh Liberation War.

== Biography ==
Siru was born in Matuail area of Dhaka, on 1 January 1951.

A few months before the Bangladesh Liberation War, he was undergoing training in the East Pakistan Army before joining the Shadhin Bangla football team.

Siru died on 3 March 2013 at Gulbagh at the age of 62. He was paralyzed after a stroke two years ago. He was buried at the Matuail Graveyard.

== Bibliography ==
- Mahmud, Dulal (2020). খেলার মাঠে মুক্তিযুদ্ধ (transl. Liberation war in the playground) (in Bengali). Bishhoshahitto Bhobon. ISBN 978-984-8218-31-0.
- Mahmud, Noman (2018). ফুটবল পায়ে মুক্তির যুদ্ধ (transl. Liberation war fought by football) (in Bengali). Agamee Prakashani. ISBN 978-984-8218-31-0.
