= Sultana Kamal (athlete) =

Bangladeshi athlete (1952–1975)

Sultana Kamal সুলতানা কামাল
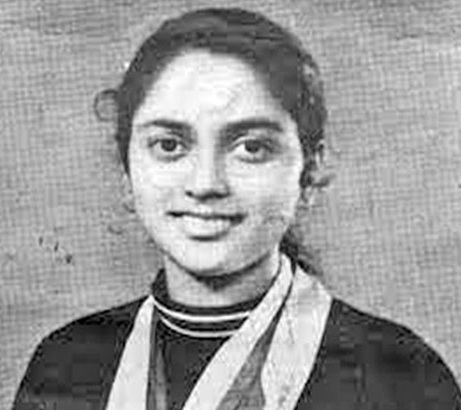

Personal information
- Native name: সুলতানা কামাল
- Nickname: Khuki
- Born: Sultana Ahmed; 10 December 1952 Bakshibazar, Dhaka
- Died: 15 August 1975 (aged 23) Dhanmondi, Dhaka
- Education: University of Dhaka
- Years active: 1965 –1975
- Spouse: Sheikh Kamal (m. 1975)
- Independence Award (2000)

Sport
- Country: Bangladesh
- Sport: Hurdles; Long jump High jump
- Team: Dhaka University

Sultana Kamal (née Sultana Ahmed; 10 December 1952 – 15 August 1975), nicknamed Khuki, was a Bangladeshi female athlete. She became the first woman Blue of Dhaka University in 1970. Sultana was married to Sheikh Kamal, the eldest son of Bangladesh's founding President Sheikh Mujibur Rahman. She was killed on 15 August 1975, during the assassination of Sheikh Mujibur Rahman family.

== Family ==
Sultana Ahmed Khuki was the eighth of the nine children of Mr. Dabiruddin Ahmed, who was an engineer of Dhaka University. She was born in Dhaka's Bakshibazar on 10 December 1952. On 14 July 1975, Sultana Ahmed married sports personality Sheikh Kamal, the eldest son of Bangabandhu Sheikh Mujibur Rahman. Afterwards, she adopted her husband's name Kamal and was henceforth known as Mrs. Sultana Kamal.

== Education and sports ==
Kamal was a student of the University of Dhaka. She held national records in long jump and 100-metres.

== Death and legacy ==
On 15 August 1975 Khuki and her husband Kamal were assassinated alongside Kamal's parents, brothers and other relatives.

In 2011, Bangladesh Women's Sports Association introduced the Sultana Kamal Independence Day Award for the contributors to Bangladesh's women's sports.

=== Eponyms ===
- Athlete Sultana Kamal Hall – a female student dormitory for Institute of Leather Engineering and Technology under the University of Dhaka
- Sultana Kamal Gymnasium - a gymnasium for the students of University of Khulna.
- Sultana Kamal bridge - a bridge at Demra.
