= Shadhin Bangla Football Team =

Shadhin Bangla football team
- Association: Bangladesh Krira Samity
- Head coach: Nani Bashak
- Captain: Zakaria Pintoo

First international
- Shadhin Bangla (Bangladesh) 2–2 Nadia XI; Khishnanagar Stadium, Nadia district, West Bengal, India; 25 July 1971

The Shadhin Bangla football team (Bengali : স্বাধীন বাংলা ফুটবল দল; lit. Independent Bengal football team) was formed by Bangladesh Krira Samity of the Bangladeshi government in exile shortly after the start of liberation war in 1971. This is the first instance of a Bangladesh national football team in any form. The team toured throughout India playing a total of 16 friendly matches to raise international awareness and economic support for the liberation war.

The Shadhin Bangla football team captain Zakaria Pintoo, was the first person to hoist the Bangladesh flag outside the territorial Bangladesh. By the end of the 16th match the team had contributed Tk 5 lac to Muktijuddho Fund in 1971.

== Players ==
Name	Home Town
(Bangladesh) late Zakaria Pintoo (captain)	Naogaon
(Bangladesh) Pratap Shankar Hazra (vice-captain)	Sreenagar
(Bangladesh) Kazi Salahuddin	Dhaka
(Bangladesh) late AKM Nowsheruzzaman	Chandpur
(Bangladesh) late Lt Khandoker M.Nurunnabi (Retired as Major General)	Kishoreganj
(Bangladesh) late Ali Imam	Faridpur
(Bangladesh) Mohammed Sheikh Taslim Uddin	Dhaka
(Bangladesh) late Ainul Haque	Gopalganj
(Bangladesh) late Fazle Sadain Khokon	Rajshahi
(Bangladesh) Late Lutfor Rahman	Jessore
(Bangladesh) Sheikh Ashraf Ali	Jessore
(Bangladesh) late Amalesh Sen	Bogra
(Bangladesh) late Abdul Hakim	Jessore
(Bangladesh) late Aminul Islam Suruz	Barisal
(Bangladesh) late Bimal Kar	Chittagong
(Bangladesh) Shuvash Chandra Shaha	Narsingdi
(Bangladesh) Mujibur Rahman	Chittagong
(Bangladesh) Mohammed Kaikobad	Brahmanbaria
(Bangladesh) Late Dewan Mohammad Sirajuddin Siru	Narayanganj.
(Bangladesh) Abdus Sattar	Naogaon
(Bangladesh) Sanjit Kumar Dey	Gazipur
(Bangladesh) Abdul Momen Joarder	Chuadanga
(Bangladesh) Late Moniruzzaman Peara	Kushtia
(Bangladesh) Enayetur Rahman Khan	Kaliganj
(Bangladesh) Shahjahan Alam	Dhaka
(Bangladesh) Aniruddha Chatterjee	Cox's Bazar
(Bangladesh) Nihar Ranjan Das	Narayanganj
(Bangladesh) Pran Govinda Kundu	Dhaka
(Bangladesh) late Mahmud Rashid	Satkhira
(Bangladesh) late Sheikh Monsur Ali Lalu	Narail

== Officials ==
Position	Name
Organizer	(Bangladesh) late Saidur Rahman Patel
Manager	(Bangladesh) Tanveer Mazhar Islam Tanna
Coach	(Bangladesh) late Nani Bashak
Secretary, Bangladesh Krira Samity	(Bangladesh) late Lutfor Rahman

== In popular culture ==
- The 2010 Bengali-language film titled Jaago is inspired by Shadin Bangla football team.
- Based on the football team, 2022 Bengali-language film Damal is produced by Impress Telefilm.

== See also ==
- Bangladesh Liberation War
- Football in Bangladesh
- Bangladesh Football Federation
- Bangladesh national football team
- East Pakistan football team
