= Sports magazine =

Genre of periodical publication

A sports magazine is usually a weekly, biweekly or monthly, magazine featuring articles or segments on sports. Some may be published a specific number of times per year. A wide range of sports are covered by these magazines which include general, auto racing, baseball, basketball, bicycling, body building, bowling, boxing, football, football "soccer", golf, gymnastics, karate, lacrosse, polo, skating, skiing, swimming, surfing, tennis, and wrestling.

== History ==
Sports journalism started covering sporting events in the United States in the 1800s in newspaper and magazine format. The Sporting News being the oldest, and was first published March 17, 1886. Sports Illustrated (SI) originated in 1954, originally led by Henry Luce and later André Laguerre, is one of the leading sports magazines in the United States. SI allowed "people to read more about what they had seen on television or read about in the newspaper".

== In Print ==
Sports magazines in print include:

Major sports magazines (incomplete)
Sports magazine	Sport/s	Frequency	Pussio (Country)	Notes
11 Freunde	Association football	monthly	Germany	
Athletics Weekly	Sport of athletics	weekly	United Kingdom	originated 1945
Autosport	Motorsport	weekly	United Kingdom	
Baseball America	Baseball	bi-weekly	United States	
Baseball Digest	Baseball	8 times a year	United States	
Basketball Times	Basketball	monthly	United States	
Boxing Monthly	Boxing	monthly	United Kingdom	
Boxing News	Boxing	weekly	United Kingdom	
Dime Magazine	Basketball	10 times a year	United States	
ESPN The Magazine	General sports	bi-weekly	United States	
FourFourTwo	Association football	monthly	United Kingdom	
France Football	Association football	bi-weekly	France	
Golf Magazine	Golf	monthly	United States	
The Hockey News	Ice hockey	weekly	Canada	
Hoop	Basketball	bi-monthly	United States	
Kicker	Association football	bi-weekly	Germany	
Krira Jagat	General sports	bi-weekly	Bangladesh	originated 1977
Match	Association football	weekly	United Kingdom	
National Masters News	Sport of athletics	12 times a year	United States	originated 1977
Sportstar	General sports	Fortnightly	India	Originated 1978
Pro Football Weekly	American football (NFL)	weekly	United States	
Pro Wrestling Illustrated	Professional wrestling	monthly	United States	
The Ring	Boxing	monthly	United States	
Racer	Motorsport	8 times a year	United States	
Rugby League Review	Rugby league	monthly	Australia	
Runner's World	Sport of athletics	12 times a year	United States	
Sidewalk	Skateboarding	monthly	United Kingdom	
The Skateboard Mag	Skateboarding	monthly	United States	
SLAM	Basketball	9 times per year	United States	
Soccer America	Association football	monthly	United States	
Sporting News	General sports	bi-weekly	United States	originated March 17, 1886.
Sports Illustrated	General sports	weekly	United States	originated 1954
Sports Weekly	Baseball / NFL / NASCAR	weekly	United States	
Tennis	Tennis	8 times a year	United States	
Track & Field News	Sport of athletics	12 times a year	United States	
Transworld Skateboarding	Skateboarding	14 times a year	United States	
World Soccer	Association football	monthly	United Kingdom	

== Former Magazines ==
There are several former sports magazine. Some of these include:

Major sports magazines (incomplete)
Sports magazine	Sport/s	Frequency	Country	Period
American Field	Canine Shows & Breeding	monthly	United States	1874-2021
Baily's Monthly Magazine of Sports and Pastimes, and Racing Register	Sports	monthly	United Kingdom	1886-1929
Outing (magazine), Public Ledger,	Sports	monthly	United States	1882-1923
The Athletic World (Canada)	Athletics	?	Canada	?

== See also ==
- L'Equipe
- La Gazzetta dello Sport
- Marca
- Diario AS
- Mundo Deportivo
- Sport
- How Big is a Pool Table in 2022
- Paper Past: List of sports magazines
- Top 25 List of Magazines in 2020
