= Ibrahim Saber =

Bangladeshi field hockey player (1945–2019)

- Born: 1945; Bengal Presidency, British India
- Died: 19 June 2019 (aged 73–74); Bangladesh Medical College Hospital, Dhaka
- Occupation: Field hockey player
- Known for: Captain of Bangladesh men's national field hockey team

Ibrahim Saber (1945 – 19 June 2019) was a Bangladeshi field hockey player and captain of Bangladesh men's national field hockey team. In recognition of his contribution in sports, he won the National Sports Awards in 1997.

== Career ==
Saber was a member of the Pakistan men's national field hockey team in the 1970s. In 1971, he was one of the team members who represented Pakistan at the Barcelona World Cup. After the liberation of Bangladesh, he was included in the National Hockey team of Bangladesh. He was the vice-captain of Bangladesh team at the Asian Games in 1978.

He captained Bangladesh during an exhibition match against the touring Sri Lanka men's national field hockey team in 1978. The game held in Mymensingh finished in an 1–1 draw. In addition to that, he played two test matches in Dhaka.

In addition to hockey, Saber was also a regular in football, cricket and basketball. He played for Abahani Limited Dhaka. He also played Dhaka First Division Football and scored a hat-trick for Azad Sporting Club in the Aga Khan Gold Cup. He died on 19 June 2019 at the age of 74 at the Bangladesh Medical College Hospital in Dhaka.
