= WAPDA Sports Club =

WAPDA Sports Club ওয়াপদা স্পোর্টস ক্লাব
- Full name: WAPDA Sports Club
- Owner: BPDB

WAPDA Sports Club (Bengali: ওয়াপদা স্পোর্টস ক্লাব) is a multi-sports club based mainly in Dhaka, Bangladesh. The club is owned by the Bangladesh Power Development Board. The club was well known for its football team which participated in domestic football prior to the turn of the century.

== Club name ==
- 1966–1970: East Pakistan Water and Power Development Authority (EPWAPDA)
- 1971–present: Bangladesh Water and Power Development Authority (BPWAPDA)

== History ==
WAPDA entered the First Division Football League of East Pakistan (now Bangladesh) in 1970 as East Pakistan WAPDA. The club coached by former Pakistan national team captain, Abid Hussain Ghazi, mainly consisted of player who were employed at the Bangladesh Power Development Board (then East Pakistan Water and Power Development Authority). The club also had a wing established in both Chittagong and Khulna, which saw them produce new talents each season.

Following the Independence of Bangladesh, the club was renamed as Bangladesh WAPDA. During the first-leg of the 1973 Dhaka League, WAPDA, led by brothers; Nowsheruzzaman and Sharifuzzaman, were league leaders before internal conflict saw them eventually finish mid-table. In the same year, the first Bangladesh national football team was announced, which included four players from the club – Nowsheruzzaman, Sharifuzzaman, Dilip Barua and Sunil Krishna Dey Chowdhury.

WAPDA suffered relegation to the Dhaka Second Division Football League in the 1984 season, and failed to return to the top-flight ever since. In the early 2000s, the club's football department, along with many other of its sports departments, stopped functioning.

== Honours ==
- Dhaka Second Division League
  - Champions (1): 1969
- Dhaka Third Division League
  - Champions (1): 1967
- Dhaka Fourth Division League
  - Champions (1): 1966

== Notable players ==
- (Pakistan) Abid Hussain Ghazi (1970)

== See also ==
- WAPDA F.C.
