= Shahidur Rahman Shantoo =

Bangladeshi footballer

Shantoo
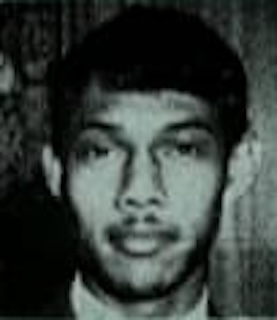
- Shantoo in 1969

Personal information
- Full name: Shahidur Rahman Chowdhury
- Date of birth: 17 November 1947 (age 78)
- Place of birth: Rangpur, East Bengal, Pakistan (present-day Bangladesh)
- Height: 1.78 m (5 ft 10 in)
- Position: Goalkeeper

Senior career*
Years	Team	Apps	(Gls)
1966	Azad		
1967–1969	Dhaka Wanderers		
1969	Mohammedan		
1970–1973	Dhaka Wanderers		
1974	Azad		
1975	East End		
1976–1979	Mohammedan		
1980–1982	Brothers Union		
1983	Dhaka Wanderers		

International career
1970	East Pakistan		
1969	Pakistan	4	(0)
1973–1982	Bangladesh		

Managerial career
- 2003–2004: Bangladesh U17
- 2004: Bangladesh U23
- 2009: Bangladesh (interim)
- * Club domestic league appearances and goals

Shahidur Rahman Chowdhury (Bengali: শহীদুর রহমান চৌধুরী; born 17 November 1947), known by his nickname Shantoo, is a former Bangladeshi football player and manager.

== Club career ==
In 1966, after giving his SSC examination in Rangpur, he moved to Dhaka. His football career started the same year for Azad Sporting Club in the First Division, after impressing Azad coach Ranjit Das. However, before playing domestic football in Dhaka, he played in the inter-district team for Rangpur and the divisional team for Rajshahi, where his team reached the district final against Dhaka. He made a name for himself while playing for the Pakistan's two biggest clubs at the time, Dhaka Wanderers and Mohammedan SC, before Bangladesh's independence.

== International career ==
=== Pakistan national team ===
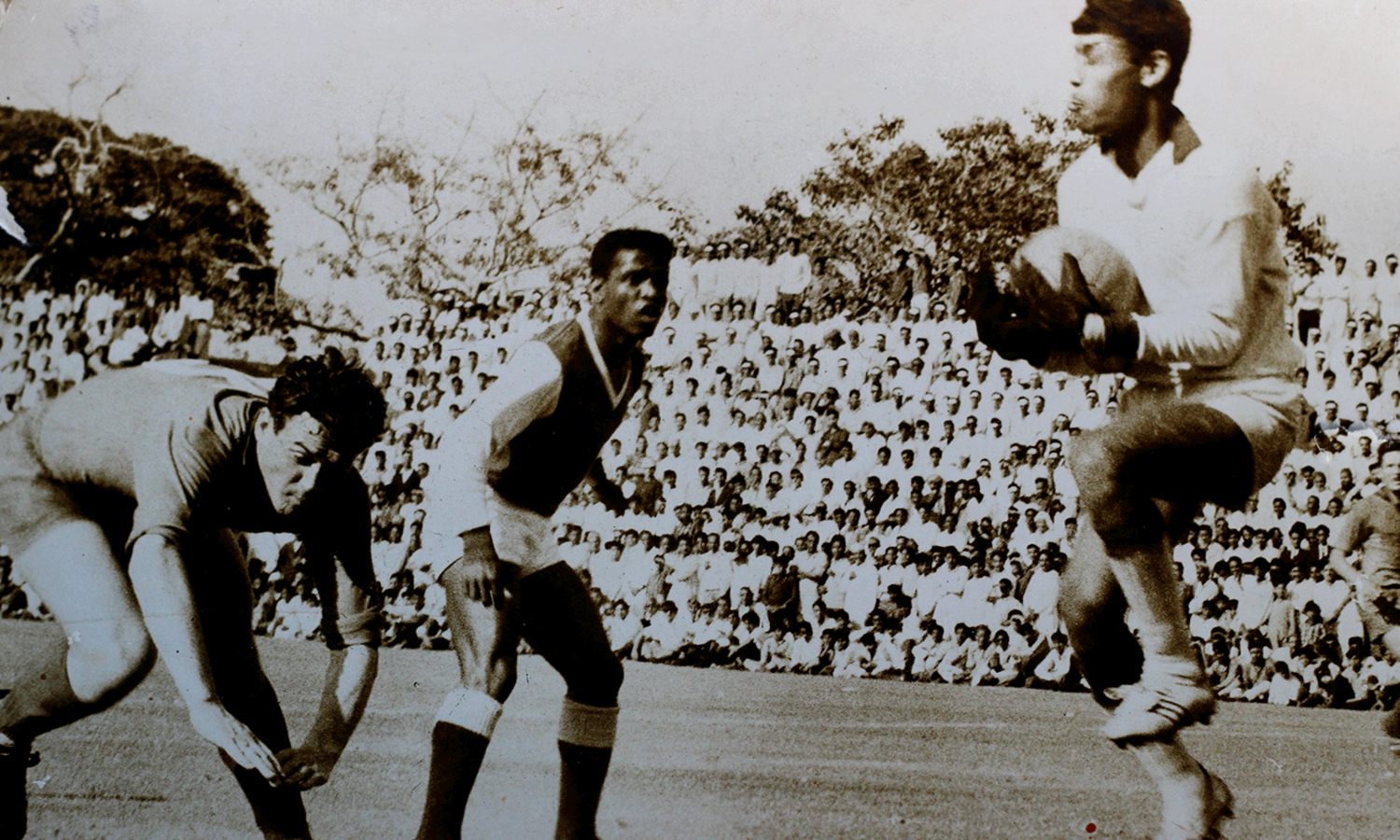
Shantoo (R) in action for Pakistan against CSKA Moscow on 28 February 1969

In 1967, after making his move to Dhaka Wanderers, he trialed for the Pakistan national football team. In March 1968, he played in test matches against Soviet club FC Kairat in home venue, and the next year he featured against CSKA Moscow during their tour to Pakistan in February 1969. He went on to represent Pakistan as starting goalkeeper during the 1969 Friendship Cup held in Iran, and the 1969 RCD Cup in Ankara, Turkey the same year. The next year, he represented Pakistan Football Federation XI at the 1970 Friendship Cup in Iran.

I actually faced many strikers from Iran and Turkey in those three or four years (with the Pakistan national team). Since then, fear had largely disappeared. I was not afraid of anyone in Bangladesh.

— Shantoo regarding his experience playing for Pakistan.

=== Bangladesh national team ===
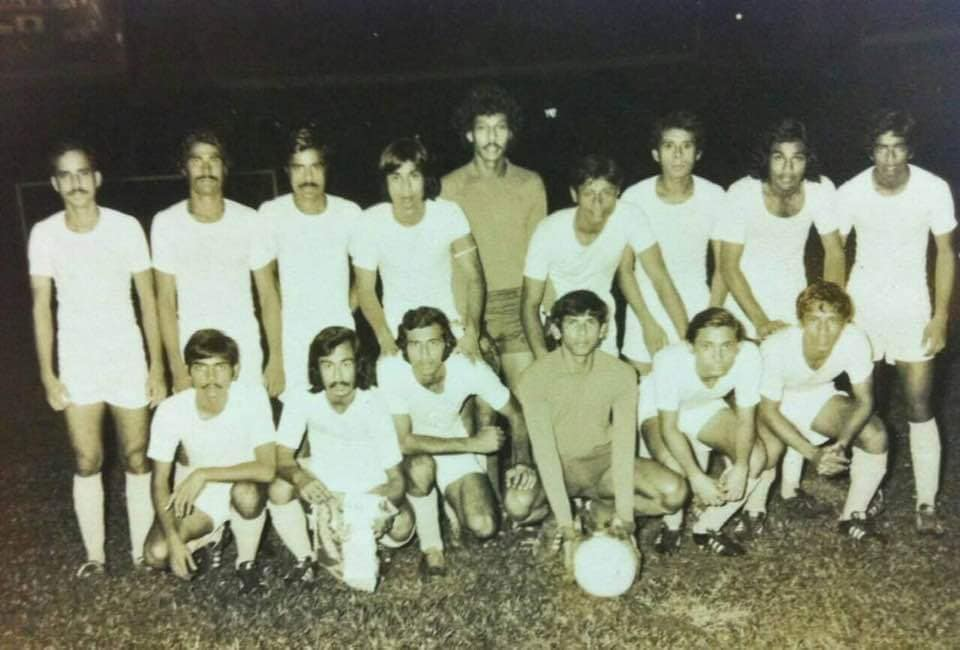
Shantoo (standing middle) with Bangladesh, 1975 Merdeka Tournament

After the 1971 Liberation War, Shantoo played for the President's XI team during the first football match in the newly independent Bangladesh, on 13 February 1972. He kept a clean sheet as his side defeated Bangladesh XI (unofficial Bangladesh national team) 2–0. On 13 May 1972, Shantoo represented the Dhaka XI team as they defeated the first international football club to visit independent Bangladesh, Mohun Bagan AC by a goal from Kazi Salahuddin.

In 1973, coach Sheikh Shaheb Ali named Shantoo in the first Bangladesh national football team squad which travelled to Malaysia for the 1973 Merdeka Tournament. He made his debut for Bangladesh against Thailand during the country's first official international game. With the encounter ending 2–2, Bangladesh were reported to have lost on penalties. With Shantoo in goal, the defense that day included captain Zakaria Pintoo, Abdul Hakim, Sheikh Ashraf Ali and Nazir Ahmed Chowdhury.

Shantoo remained the first choice goalkeeper for the national team during 1975 Merdeka Tournament in Malaysia, 1976 King's Cup and 1978 Asian Games in Bangkok, the 1980 AFC Asian Cup qualifiers in Dhaka, South Korea's 1979 President's Cup, Kuwait's 1980 AFC Asian Cup, President's Gold Cup in Dhaka in 1981 and lastly during the 1982 Quaid-e-Azam International Tournament in Pakistan.

Shantoo was made the national team captain for the 1976 King's Cup and retained the role for the 1978 Asian Games. At the time when the Dhaka Derby was one of the most heated football rivalries in South Asia, Bangladesh Football Federation's decision to choose Mohammedan's Shantoo over the more experienced Monwar Hossain Nannu of Abahani Krira Chakra, was criticized by both players and fans. This led to six Abahani players quitting the national team before the tournament.

In the opening match of the 1980 AFC Asian Cup against North Korea, coach Abdur Rahim had to substitute an injured Shantoo for the second choice Wahiduzzaman Pintu. Nevertheless, after Pintu's consecutive blunders Bangladesh lost the opening game 2–3. Shantoo went on to start the next couple of the group-stage games against Syria and Iran, conceding a total of 8 goals during them.

== Coaching career ==
=== Bangladesh U17 ===
Shantoo first coached the Bangladesh U17 team during the 2004 AFC U-17 Championship qualification, and led the team to qualification to the main round with a 3–0 aggregate victory over Kyrgyzstan U17. His performance resulted in his contract being extended at the end of 2003.

Shantoo remained incharge of the Bangladesh U17 team for the 2004 AFC U-17 Championship. Although the team got tharshed by Qatar and Iran during the tournament, the team produced future senior international players such as Mohamed Zahid Hossain and Mithun Chowdhury.

=== Bangladesh U23 ===
Shantoo managed the defending champions Bangladesh U23 during the 2004 South Asian Games. After a 0–0 draw with India and a 2–1 win over Afghanistan, going into the last group game the Bangladesh team needed a draw against Pakistan to advance past the group-stage. However, Muhammad Essa late penalty knocked Bangladesh out of the tournament.

=== BFF technical director ===
In November 2008, Shantoo was appointed as the first technical director of the Bangladesh Football Federation. Shantoo served in his post until 31 October 2010 when he was replaced by Bayazid Alam Zubair Nipu. It was reported that he was paid $3,000 in the first year, which was eventually reduced to Tk 1 lakh from his second year. Shantoo was also responsible for the appointment of Brazilian coach Dido as the head coach of the Bangladesh national team in December 2008.

=== Bangladesh ===
Shantoo was made the interim coach of the senior team before the 2009 SAFF Championship, after Brazilian coach Dido was sacked less than a month before the tournament got underway, as he refused to select established senior players. Shantoo's team cruised through the group-stage, with 4–1 and 2–1 wins over Bhutan and Sri Lanka However, in the semi-final Bangladesh suffered a 0–1 defeat to eventual champions India who had fielded an U23 side. The game marked the end of Shantoo's coaching career.

== Honours ==
Mohammedan SC

- Dhaka First Division League: 1969, 1976, 1978

Brothers Union

- Federation Cup: 1980
- Aga Khan Gold Cup: 1981–82

East Pakistan

- King Mahendra Cup: 1970

Awards and accolades

- 1979 − Sports Writers Association's Footballer of the Year.
- 1979 − Sports Writers Association's Best Sportsperson Award.
- 2004 − National Sports Award.

== Cricket career ==
Shantoo also played domestic cricket for Mohammedan SC from 70s to 80s, and regularly played as a left-handed medium pace bowler. In the 1970s, during the Shahid Smriti tournament, he took 3 wickets in a single over against Dhaka Wanderers Club cricket team. During the 1963–64 season, he came to Dhaka to play summer cricket for the Sunrise Club of Rajshahi as an eighth grade student. In the first match against National Sporting, he created a surprise with 7 wickets for 14 runs. In the First Division Cricket League he made his debut playing for Dhaka Wanderers Club in 1967. In the 1976–77 season he was a member of the Comilla team that won the national title defeating Dacca in the final.

== See also ==
- List of association footballers who have been capped for two senior national teams

== Bibliography ==
- Dulal, Mahmud (2020). খেলার মাঠে মুক্তিযুদ্ধ (transl. Liberation war in the playground) (in Bengali). Bishhoshahitto Bhobon. ISBN 978-984-8218-31-0.
- Dulal, Mahmud (2014). পাকিস্তান জাতীয় দল বাঙালি খেলোয়াড় (transl. Bengali players in the Pakistan national team) (in Bengali). Bishhoshahitto Bhobon.
- Alam, Masud (2017). ফুটবলের গল্প ফুটবলারদের গল্প (transl. The story of football the story of footballers) (in Bengali). Bishhoshahitto Bhobon. ISBN 9789849134688.
- Mahmud, Noman (2018). ফুটবল পায়ে মুক্তির যুদ্ধ (transl. Liberation war fought by football) (in Bengali). Agamee Prakashani. ISBN 978-984-8218-31-0.
