= Azad Sporting Club =

Azad Sporting Club আজাদ স্পোর্টিং ক্লাব
- Full name: Azad Sporting Club
- Founded: 1949; 77 years ago
- Ground: Azad Sporting Club Ground, Arambagh
- President: Enayet Hossain
- V. President: MA Mannan
Home colours

Azad Sporting Club (Bengali: আজাদ স্পোর্টিং ক্লাব), also referred as Azad SC, is an association football club based in Dhaka, Bangladesh. The club was considered one of the pioneers of Bengali football in East Pakistan and participated in the Dhaka First Division Football League until relegation in 1985. The club has been inactive in the domestic football circuit since the turn of the century.

== History ==
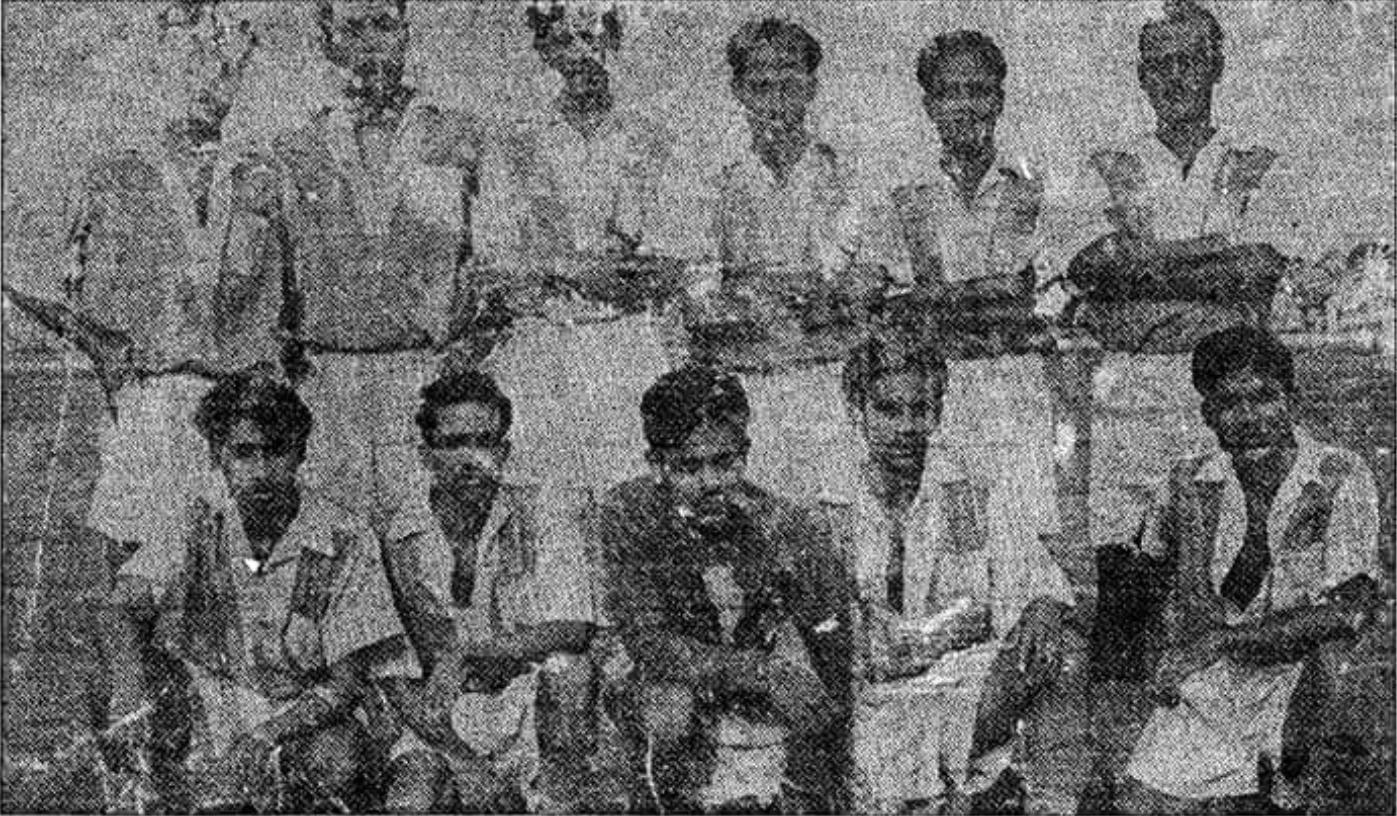
Azad Sporting Club, champions of the 1958 Dhaka First Division League

Azad Sporting Club was formed in 1949 by Bengali writers and cultural organizers. Renowned artist Quamrul Hassan chose the colour and designed the club's kit. MA Kayum and Anwar Hossain were appointed the club's president and general secretary, respectively. They entered the Dhaka Second Division League and were promoted to the First Division within two years after finishing runners-up behind Fire Service AC in 1950.

In 1951, the club entered the First Division League, and were captained by Tofazzel Hossain. They finished runners-up in the top-tier in both 1953 and 1954. The club was almost entirely made up of Bengali players, which was unlike most top-tier teams at the time who favoured Punjabi and Makrani players.

The club transformed with the appointment of general secretary Saifuddin Ahmed as they won their first and only First Division League title in 1958. With the club tied on points with Central Station & Printing Press after the initial league phase, Tajul Islam Manna scored a brace, and Habib Ahmed added another goal as Azad won the play-off game 3–2 to claim their maiden league title. Manna was the league's top scorer that year with 25 goals. Alongside him, the other notable players in the team were captain Ranjit Das and winger SA Jamman Mukta.

Their title triumph saw them participate in the first edition of the Aga Khan Gold Cup in 1958. (Note: The competition is widely regarded as the predecessor of AFC Champions League (held for the first time in 1967), since it was the first organized international competition that involved club teams around Asia, organized by the football authorities of East Pakistan, in collaboration with Asian Football Confederation (AFC).) The club were tagged as Giant Killers after the Independence of Bangladesh, nonetheless, were relegated to the Second Division in 1985. Eventually, in the 1993–94 season, the club descended to the Third Division, and the following season, in 1994–95, they plummeted even further to the Pioneer Division. In 1998, their football department stopped functioning due to financial restraints.

== Notable players ==
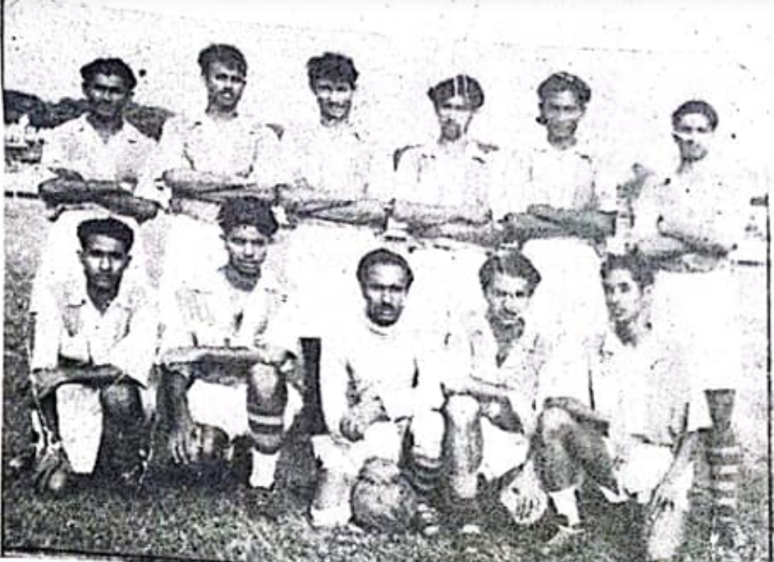
Azad Sporting Club 1953

The most notable player to have represented the club is center-forward Tajul Islam Manna, who played for them from 1954 to 1963, scoring 77 league goals including 10 hat-tricks in the process. The East Pakistani striker also represented the Pakistan national team in 1955, scoring the only goal of the game against India in a Non-FIFA Friendly.

Other notable players include: Tarapada Roy, Ranjit Das, SA Jamman Mukta, Jalil Ansari, Monwar Hossain Nannu, Shahidur Rahman Shantoo, Anjam Hossain, Ehtesham, Habib Ahmed, Abdus Salam Murshedy, Mari Chowdhury, Khandoker Nurunnabi, Elias Hossain, Md Kamruzzaman, Anwar Hossain, Khandoker Abul Hasan and Subal Das. Sheikh Monsur Ali Lalu who later played for the Shadhin Bangla football team also began his First Division career with the club.

== Club members ==
=== President ===
No.	Name	From	To
1	MA Kayum	1949	1950
2	Alhaj Moti Sardar	1951	1952
3	AA Siddique	1953	1960
4	SR Karim	1961	1962
5	Kofiluddin Mahmud	1963	1971
6	Mohazzem Hossain	1972	1976
7	Mir Shawkat Ali	1977	1980
8	Salam Talukdar	1981	1983
9	Azhar Ali	1984	1987
10	MA Hamid	1988	1989
11	Sayeed Mohammed Anwar Hossain	1992	1993
12	Mosharaf Hossain Shajahan	1994	1998
13	Enayet Hossain	2009	present

=== General Scretary ===
No.	Name	From	To
1	Anwar Hossain	1949	1951
2	AA Siddique	1952	1957
3	Saifuddin Ahmed	1958	1989
4	Kazi Anisur Rahman	1994	1995
5	M. A. Rashid	1996	1999
6	Reza Ali Bulu	1996	2001
7	Mujibur Rahman	2009	present

=== Head coach ===
Name	From	To
Ranjit Das	–	–
Abdul Sadek	1978	1979
Ehtesham	1980	1982
Mozzamel Hossain	1983	1983

== Records and statistics ==
=== Season by season ===
Record as Dhaka First Division Football League member
Season	Division	League								Federation Cup	Independence Cup	Top league scorer(s)	
Season	Division	P	W	D	L	GF	GA	Pts	Position	Federation Cup	Independence Cup	Player	Goals
1973	First Division	28	7	8	13	38	44	22	9th	—	—		
1974	First Division	15	5	5	5	19	18	16	10th	—	—		
1975	First Division	30	7	7	16	24	40	21	14th	—	—		
1976	First Division	15	3	4	8	14	29	10	15th	—	—		
1977	First Division	15	3	8	4	7	12	14	10th	—	—		
1978	First Division	24	6	11	7	17	20	20	8th	—	—		
1979	First Division	16	3	6	7	9	14	12	13th	—	—		
1980	First Division	22	5	9	8	14	20	19	7th	First round	—		
1981	First Division	16	3	4	9	7	11	10	17th	First round	—		
1982	First Division	16	4	7	5	13	13	15	10th	Second round	—		
1983	First Division	16	2	9	5	14	21	13	11th	First round	—		
1984	First Division	19	3	11	5	10	18	20	14th	Quarter-final	—		
1985	First Division	18	2	8	7	12	19	14	17th	DNP	—		

Note: Azad Sporting Club competed in the Dhaka Second Division League from 1949 to 1950 and entered the First Division in 1951, however, only records after the Independence of Bangladesh are available.

== Honours ==
- Dhaka First Division League
  - Winners (1): 1958
- Dhaka Second Division League
  - Runners-up (1): 1950
- Independence Day Tournament
  - Winners (1): 1959

== Other departments ==
=== Volleyball ===
The club's volleyball team participates in the Premier Division Volleyball league under the Bangladesh Volleyball Federation. They were runners-up to WAPDA SC in the league during the 1975–76 season, which remains their best finish to date.

=== Field hockey ===
The club's field hockey team currently plays in the Premier Division Hockey League. They are yet to win the league title although the club's hockey team has been a regular participant in the league since the independence of Bangladesh. In February 2024, the club withdrew its name from the 2024 Premier Division Hockey League citing financial issues.

=== Cricket ===
The club's cricket team last participated in the 2015 Dhaka Premier Division Cricket League. They have had national cricket team captains Akram Khan and Shakib Al Hasan represent them in the domestic competitions.

=== Kabaddi ===
Azad Sporting Club has both men's and women's Kabaddi teams playing in the First Division Kabaddi League. In 2015, they became champions in the first open Women's Beach Kabaddi Competition, defeating Judain Janata Club by 53-51 points in the final held in Cox's Bazar.

== See also ==
- List of football clubs in Bangladesh
- History of football in Bangladesh
