= Sheikh Kamal =

Bangladeshi politician, athlete and military officer (1949–1975)

- শেখ কামাল
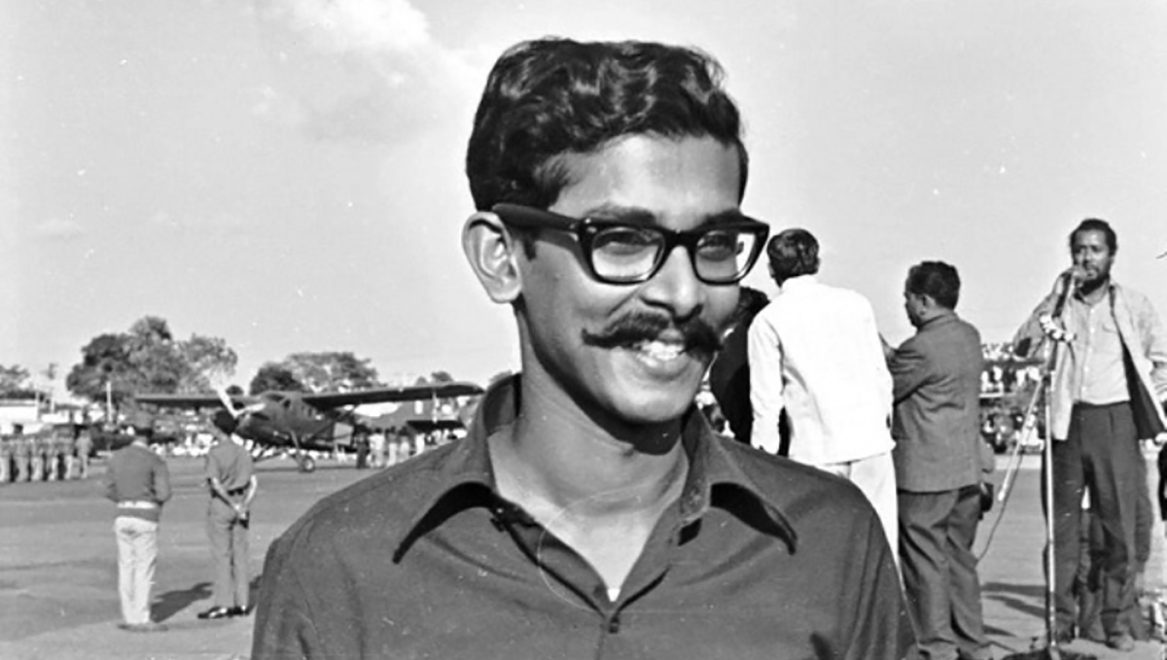
- Born: 5 August 1949; Tungipara, East Bengal, Pakistan
- Died: 15 August 1975 (aged 26); Dacca, Bangladesh
- Cause of death: Assassination
- Resting place: Banani graveyard, Dhaka
- Citizenship: Pakistan (1949–1971); Bangladesh (1971–1975)
- Education: Master's
- Alma mater: University of Dhaka
- Occupations: Athlete; politician; military officer
- Organization: Abahani Limited Dhaka
- Television: Triratna (1975)
- Movement: Six point movement Anti-Ayub Movement; Non-cooperation movement (1971)
- Spouse: Sultana Khuki (m. 1975)
- Parents: Bangabandhu Sheikh Mujibur Rahman (father); Sheikh Fazilatunnesa Mujib (mother)
- Relatives: See Tungipara Sheikh family
- Family: Sheikh Hasina (older sister); Sheikh Jamal (younger brother); Sheikh Rehana (younger sister); Sheikh Russel (younger brother)
- Awards: Independence Award; National Sports Award
- Military career
- Allegiance: Bangladesh
- Branch: Bangladesh Liberation Army; Bangladesh Army
- Service years: 1971–1973
- Rank: Captain
- Unit: East Bengal Regiment
- Commands: Aide-de-camp (ADC) to the Commander-in-chief of Bangladesh Liberation Army
- Conflicts: Bangladesh Liberation War

Sheikh Kamal (5 August 1949 – 15 August 1975) was a Bangladeshi politician, athlete, and military officer. He was the eldest son of Sheikh Mujibur Rahman, the founding president of Bangladesh, and the younger brother of Sheikh Hasina, who would later become prime minister of Bangladesh. He was the founder of Abahani Limited Dhaka. He is considered as a youth icon in Bangladesh.

== Early life and education ==
Kamal completed his matriculation from Shaheen School, Dhaka, in 1967 and his Higher Secondary Certificate Examination from Dhaka College in 1969. Kamal was the general secretary of the Chatro League at Dhaka College. He was also an active participant in several nationalist movements, including the Six Point program, the 1968–69 Pakistan revolution, and the Non-cooperation movement (1971). He practiced sitar at Chhayanaut, a school of music. He graduated with honors in sociology from the University of Dhaka. At the same time, he was involved in diverse cultural activities and a keen sportsman. He liked an athlete, Sultana Khuki, who was the first female blue of Dhaka University. On 14 July 1975, the couple married with the consent of the two families.

== Career ==
Kamal was an organizer of the Mukti Bahini guerrilla struggle in 1971. Kamal received a wartime commission in the Bangladesh Army during the Liberation War of Bangladesh. Kamal worked as the aide-de-camp (ADC) of General Osmani, the commander-in-chief of the Mukti Bahini, during the Liberation War of Bangladesh. After independence, he left the military at the rank of captain to return to Dhaka University.

Kamal, an avid sportsman, founded Abahani Limited Dhaka in 1972, a popular sporting club in Bangladesh. He enjoyed football, badminton, volleyball, and other sports. Abahani went on to win many local championships and is considered one of the known football clubs in South Asia.

Kamal was also a regular performer at Natyachakra, where he gained widespread acclaim for his acting in several plays. Among his notable performances were 'Danob' (The Monster), based on Maxim Gorky's 'The Devil' and directed by the eminent theater personality Mohammad Hamid; Bijon Bhattacharya's 'Nabanna'; and Al Mansur's 'Roller Ebong Nihoto LMG' and 'Ami Montri Hobo'. He secured first place in the inter-university drama competition.

In April 1972, representing the Dhaka University Sanskriti Sangsad, he participated in the 'Bangladesh-India Friendship Cultural Exchange Fair' held in Kolkata. There, he played the lead role in the play 'Keu Kichu Bolte Pare Na', an adaptation of George Bernard Shaw's 'You Never Can Tell', translated by Munier Choudhury. In 1975, Sheikh Kamal acted in the television series 'Triratna'. Only two episodes of the series were aired before his death. He also served as the director and scriptwriter for the series.

== Death ==
Kamal was perceived to be the successor to Sheikh Mujib. Kamal and his wife were killed along with the rest of his family, except for his sisters Sheikh Hasina and Sheikh Rehana, on 15 August 1975.

== Legacy ==
=== Controversy ===
==== 1973 shootout ====
Near the end of 1973, Kamal was involved in a shootout in which he was inflicted with bullet injuries. Multiple claims have been made as to how the shootout occurred. However, a retired major general of the Bangladesh Army claimed that it was a case of friendly fire. Near the end of 1973, Bangladeshi security forces received intelligence that the left-wing revolutionary activist Siraj Sikder and his insurgents were going to launch coordinated attacks around Dhaka. Police and other security officers were on full alert and patrolling the streets of Dhaka in plain clothes. Kamal and his friends were armed and also patrolling the city in a microbus, looking for Siraj Sikder. When the microbus was in Dhanmondi, the police mistook Sheikh Kamal and his friends to be insurgents and opened fire on them, injuring Kamal. However, it is also claimed that Kamal and his friends were in Dhanmondi to test drive a new car that his friend Iqbal Hassan Mahmood had bought recently. Since Dhaka was under heavy police patrol, police special forces under the command of then-city SP Mahamuddin Bir Bikrom opened fire on the car, thinking that the passengers were miscreants.

=== Namesakes ===
- Sheikh Kamal International Cricket Stadium Academy Ground in Cox's Bazar, Bangladesh, was named after him.
- Shaheed Sheikh Kamal Bridge on the Andharmanik River is also named after him.
- The National Sports Council Award was previously named the Sheik Kamal NSC Award after him
