= List of Bangladesh international footballers born outside Bangladesh =

Wikimedia list article

This is a list of Bangladesh international footballers born outside their country, including naturalised and overseas players with Bangladeshi ancestry.

== List of players ==
This is a list of football players who represented the Bangladesh national football team in international football and were born outside Bangladesh.

The following players:

1. have played at least one game for the full (senior male) Bangladesh national team; and
2. were born outside Bangladesh.

This list includes players who have dual citizenship with Bangladesh and/or have become naturalised Bangladeshi citizens. The players are ordered per the year of debut.

As of 19 November 2026

List of players
Country of birth	Player	Period	Caps	Goals	Ref.
Denmark	Jamal Bhuyan	2013–present	99	1	
Finland	Tariq Kazi (Note: Previously represented Finland at youth level)	2021–present	44	2	
Nigeria	Eleta Kingsley (Note: Naturalized, not by descent)	2023	2	0	
England	Hamza Choudhury	2025–present	15	5	
Canada	Shamit Shome (Note: Previously represented Canada)	2025–present	14	2	
United States	Zayyan Ahmed	2025–present	13	0	
England	Cuba Mitchell	2025–present	1	0	
England	Farhaan Ali Wahid	2026–present	4	2	
England	Zidane Yousuf	2026–present	6	0	
Japan	Shuki Itofusa	2026–present	5	0	

== List of countries ==
List of countries
Country of birth	Total
Canada	1
Denmark	1
England	4
Finland	1
Japan	1
Nigeria	1
United States	1

== See also ==
- List of Bangladesh international footballers
