= Bangladesh national football team results =

This article details the fixtures and results of the Bangladesh national football team.

== See also ==
- Bangladesh national football team head-to-head record
- Bangladesh women's national football team results
