= Debajit Sarkar =

Bangladeshi footballer (born 2007)

Personal information
- Date of birth: 17 June 2007 (age 19)
- Place of birth: Dhaka, Bangladesh
- Height: 1.83 m (6 ft 0 in)
- Positions: Left winger; central midfielder

Team information
- Current team: Sarnese

Youth career
- Ausonia Academy
- Caronnese

Senior career*
Years	Team	Apps	(Gls)
2025–2026	Caronnese		
2026–	Sarnese	0	(0)
- * Club domestic league appearances and goals

Debajit Sarkar (Bengali: দেবজিৎ সরকার, pronounced [debodʒit ʃɔrkar]; born 17 June 2007) is a footballer who plays as a left winger or central-midfielder for Serie D club Sarnese.

== Early life ==
Born on 17 June 2007 at Apollo Hospital in Dhaka, Sarkar's family is originally from Gopalganj, Bangladesh. At the age of three, he moved to Italy with his family, where he began his football development, following his mother's relocation for work as a nurse. He developed at Ausonia Academy before joining Caronnese.

== Club career ==
=== Caronnese ===
Sarkar progressed to Caronnese and made his first-team debut for the club. Caronnese had included Sarkar in their squad during the 2025–26 season. His emergence at senior level attracted the attention of Sarnese, who subsequently signed him in 2026.

=== Sarnese ===
In July 2026, Sarkar joined Sarnese from Caronnese on a free transfer. Sarnese signed Sarkar as part of their project aimed at developing young players and competing for promotion to professional football.

== International career ==
Sarkar expressed his interest in representing Bangladesh in 2026. In September 2026, he received his first call-up to the Bangladesh national team ahead of the 2026 FIFA ASEAN Cup and joined the national team's training camp. He played a practice match there against City Club.

== Style of play ==
Sarkar is primarily described as an attacking wide player, although he can also operate as a central midfielder. Italian reports have highlighted his technical ability, pace, creativity, versatility and work rate.
