= Bangladesh national football team =

Men's association football team

Bangladesh
- Association: Bangladesh Football Federation
- Confederation: Asian Football Confederation
- Sub-confederation: South Asian Football Federation
- Head coach: Thomas Dooley
- Captain: Topu Barman
- Most caps: Jamal Bhuyan (99)
- Top scorer: Ashraf Uddin Ahmed Chunnu (17)
- Home stadium: National Stadium
- FIFA code: BAN
First colours	Second colours

FIFA ranking
- Current: 182 (18 November 2026)
- Highest: 110 (April 1996)
- Lowest: 197 (February–May 2018)

First international
- Bangladesh 2–2 Thailand (Kuala Lumpur, Malaysia; 27 July 1973)

Biggest win
- Bangladesh 8–0 Maldives (Dhaka, Bangladesh; 23 December 1985)

Biggest defeat
- South Korea 9–0 Bangladesh (Incheon, South Korea; 16 September 1979); Iran 9–0 Bangladesh (Karachi, Pakistan; 18 February 1982)

Asian Cup
- Appearances: 1 (first in 1980)
- Best result: Group stage (1980)

AFC Challenge Cup
- Appearances: 2 (first in 2006)
- Best result: Quarter-finals (2006)

SAFF Championship
- Appearances: 13 (first in 1995)
- Best result: Champions (2003)

ASEAN Cup (as guest)
- Appearances: 1 (first in 2026)
- Best result: Group stage (2026)
Medal record
Men's football
SAFF Championship
Gold medal – first place	2003 Bangladesh	Team
Silver medal – second place	2005 Pakistan	Team
Silver medal – second place	1999 India	Team
Bronze medal – third place	1995 Sri Lanka	Team
South Asian Games
Gold medal – first place	1999 Katmandu	Team
Silver medal – second place	1984 Kathmandu	Team
Silver medal – second place	1985 Dhaka	Team
Silver medal – second place	1989 Islamabad	Team
Silver medal – second place	1995 Madras	Team
Bronze medal – third place	1991 Colombo	Team
- Website: bff.com.bd

The Bangladesh national football team (Bengali: বাংলাদেশ জাতীয় ফুটবল দল) is the national recognised football team of Bangladesh and is controlled by the Bangladesh Football Federation (BFF), the governing body for football in Bangladesh, formed in 1972. Bangladesh became a member of the Asian Football Confederation (AFC) in 1973 and FIFA in 1976.

The Bangladesh team debuted in 1973 and has yet to qualify for the FIFA World Cup finals. They were dismissed in the first round of their only Asian Cup appearance to date in 1980. By qualifying for it, Bangladesh is one of only two South Asian nations to achieve the feat. The nation's best results came at the subcontinental level, where it won the 2003 SAFF Gold Cup and was the gold medalist at the 1999 South Asian Games.

== History ==
=== Emergence (1971–1980) ===
Prior to the independence of Bangladesh, the East Pakistan football team represented the region in national and international matches beginning in 1948. The first true precursor to a Bangladesh national football team emerged during the 1971 Liberation War with the formation of the Shadhin Bangla football team, which toured India playing exhibition matches and donated all their prize money to support the provisional Bangladesh government. Following the eight-month war and the eventual surrender of the Pakistan Army on 16 December 1971, a de facto national side known as Dhaka XI became active the next year, earning a notable win in Dhaka against Mohun Bagan on 13 May 1972, and finishing as runners-up in the Bordoloi Trophy held in Guwahati, India, from August 1972.

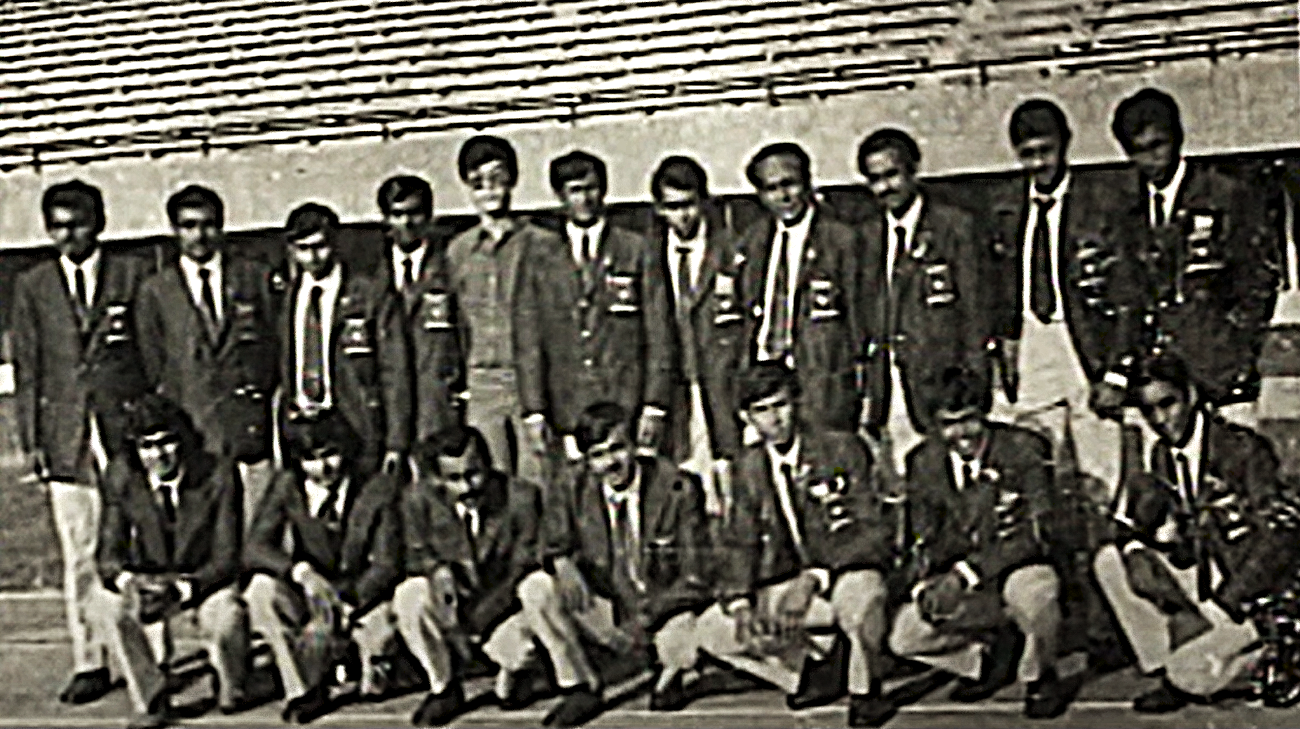
Bangladesh at the 1973 Merdeka Cup

The Bangladesh Football Federation (BFF) was founded on 15 July 1972 by Muhammad Yusuf Ali, the country's former Minister of Education and Cultural Affairs. BFF became affiliated with AFC in 1973 and FIFA in 1976. Former Dhaka XI head coach Sheikh Shaheb Ali was put in charge of the first national team, and Zakaria Pintoo, who led the Shadhin Bangla team before liberation, was made its captain. In July 1973, Malaysia invited Bangladesh to take part in the Merdeka Cup. Along with Pintoo, the first national team consisted of: Shahidur Rahman Shantoo, Abdul Motaleb, Monwar Hossain Nannu, Dilip Barua, Nazir Ahmed, Firoj Kabir, Farukuzzaman, Abdul Hakim, Sharifuzzaman, Md Kaikobad, Enayetur Rahman, Kazi Salahuddin, Pratap Shankar Hazra, Sheikh Ashraf Ali, Sunil Krishna and Nowsher.

Sheikh Mujibur Rahman with the 1975 Merdeka Cup bound Bangladesh team.

On 27 July 1973, the Bangladesh football team played its first official game, a 2–2 draw against Thailand in the Merdeka Cup. Enayetur Rahman scored the country's first-ever international goal, and the second goal was scored by fellow striker Kazi Salahuddin. After the stalemate, the game went to penalties, where Bangladesh lost 6–5. On 13 August 1973, after concluding their journey in Malaysia, the team played a friendly in Singapore, and earned their first ever win by defeating the hosts 1–0, thanks to a goal from Nowsher. In August 1975, Bangladesh was again invited to partake in the Merdeka Cup held in Kuala Lumpur, Malaysia. During their underwhelming tournament, the players were informed about the assassination of Sheikh Mujibur Rahman, and decided to abandon the tournament to return home amidst the political unrest. However, fearing a FIFA ban, the team was obliged to play their game with South Korea, making a symbolic protest by keeping the Bangladesh flag at half-mast and wearing a black badge, as they lost 4–0.

Aside from competing in the 1976 King's Cup, Bangladesh remained largely inactive until 1978, when Werner Bickelhaupt was appointed as the country's first foreign coach. The team faced internal conflict ahead of the 1978 Asian Games in Bangkok, as the captaincy initially handed to Monwar Hossain Nannu of Dhaka Abahani was eventually given to Shahidur Rahman Shantoo of rival club Mohammedan. In protest, seven Abahani players, including Nannu, quit the squad. The depleted and inexperienced team struggled in the tournament, losing 0–1 to Malaysia and 0–3 to India.

The 1980 AFC Asian Cup qualifiers began on home soil on 1 March 1979, and under coaches Anwar Hossain and Anjam Hossain, Bangladesh opened with draws against Afghanistan and Qatar before securing a 3–2 victory over Afghanistan in the penultimate match, which was enough to qualify for the main tournament. At the 1980 AFC Asian Cup in Kuwait, coached by the veteran Abdur Rahim, Bangladesh was drawn with Iran, North Korea, Syria, and China. They began the tournament respectably with a narrow 3–2 loss to North Korea, with goals from Kazi Salahuddin and Ashrafuddin Ahmed Chunnu, and a 0–1 defeat to Syria. However, the remaining games saw Bangladesh suffer 7–0 and 6–0 defeats, respectively, to Iran and China, which saw them finish bottom of their group.

=== Shortcomings (1981–1989) ===
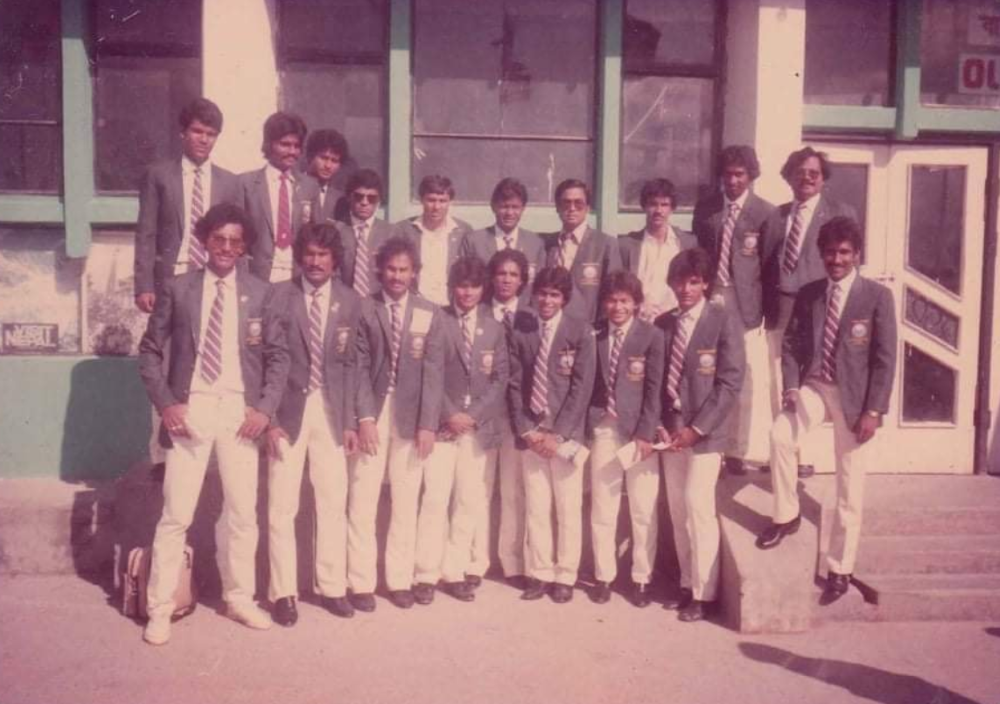
Bangladesh at the 1984 SA Games

Bangladesh took part in the 1982 Quaid-e-Azam International Tournament in Karachi, Pakistan, under the guidance of Abdul Gafur Baloch, who had previously coached the country's youth teams. The team struggled throughout the competition, failing to win a single match and suffering a heavy 9–0 defeat to Iran, matching their loss to South Korea at the 1979 Korea President's Cup as their joint heaviest-ever defeat. Following the tour, the BFF appointed German head coach Gerd Schmidt ahead of the 1982 Asian Games in New Delhi, India. Bangladesh went into the tournament without players from leading club Dhaka Abahani, who were arrested following a First Division League match brawl and were eventually indicted for allegedly conspiring in a potential coup against Chief Martial Law Administrator Hussain Muhammad Ershad. The team was eliminated at the group stage after defeats to India and China, before earning their first victory on Asia's biggest stage against Malaysia (2–1), with Ashish Bhadra and Badal Roy scoring.

In 1983, during the third President's Gold Cup held in Dhaka, Ashrafuddin Ahmed Chunnu scored a hat trick in a 4–2 victory over Nepal in a group match, becoming the first Bangladeshi player to achieve this feat. The following year, Bangladesh attempted to qualify for their second AFC Asian Cup but finished second from bottom in their group during the 1984 AFC Asian Cup qualification in Jakarta, Indonesia. In the inaugural South Asian Games in 1984, Bangladesh participated without players from one of the country's leading clubs, Mohammedan, who instead took part in the IFA Shield in India. The team topped the group stage, defeating Bhutan 2–0, Maldives 5–0, and Nepal 5–0. However, they finished as runners-up after a 4–2 defeat to hosts Nepal in the final at the Dasharath Stadium in Kathmandu.

In March 1985, Bangladesh began their 1986 FIFA World Cup qualification campaign, where they were grouped with India, Indonesia, and Thailand. The team recorded its first-ever World Cup qualifying victory with a comeback win against Indonesia at the Dhaka Stadium, overturning a one-goal deficit through goals from Kaiser Hamid and Ashrafuddin Ahmed Chunnu, and then followed it up with a 1–0 win over Thailand, though they ultimately finished bottom of the group with four defeats. Following this, Bangladesh achieved a runners-up finish at the 1985 Quaid-e-Azam International Tournament in Peshawar, Pakistan, losing to North Korea in the final. In the wake of their first World Cup qualifying campaign and strong showing in Pakistan, Bangladesh entered the 1985 South Asian Games in December as one of the favourites, topping their group, including an 8–0 victory over Maldives, their biggest win ever, but fell short in the final, losing to India on penalties.

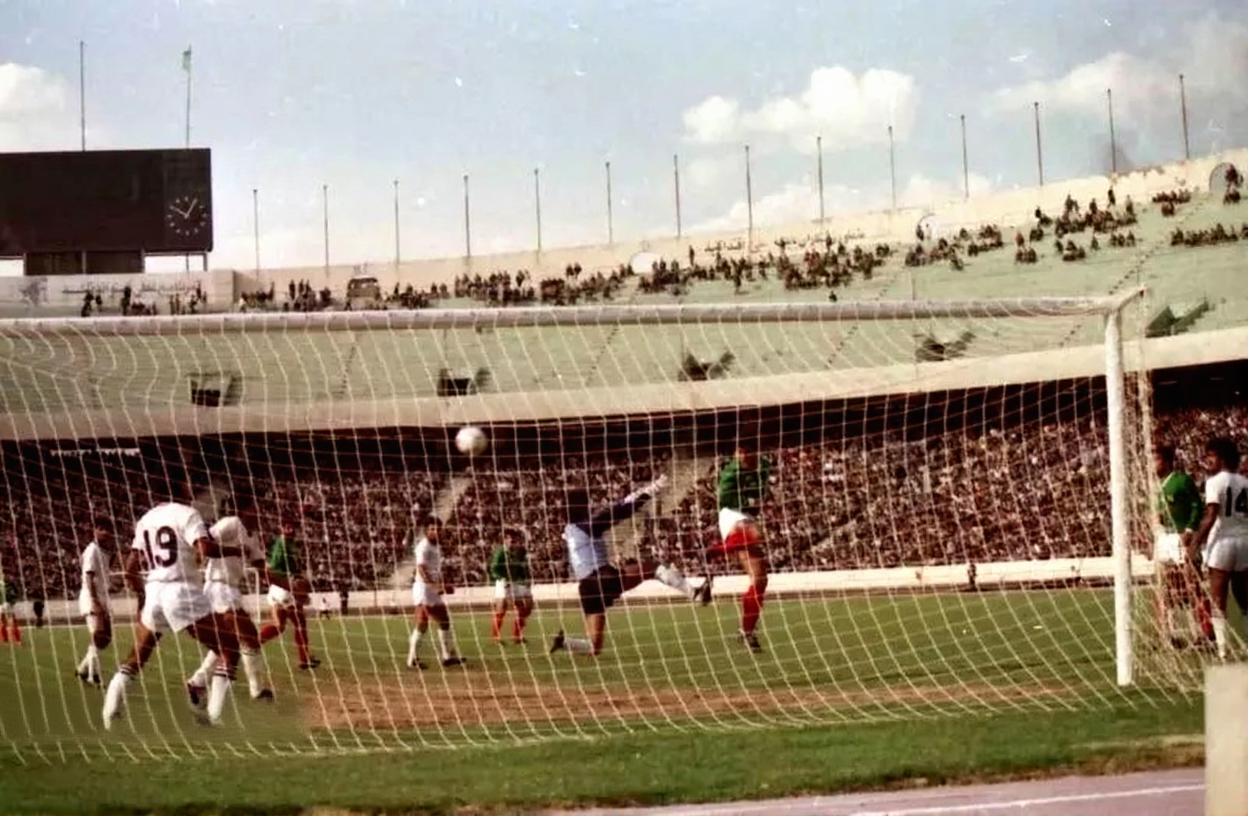
Bangladesh facing Iran during their 1990 FIFA World Cup qualification fixture held in Tehran on 17 March 1989.

In the 1986 Asian Games in South Korea, Bangladesh suffered defeats to Japan, Kuwait, and Iran and won against Nepal, finishing second from bottom in their group. In the 1987 South Asian Games, Bangladesh, who finished runners-up in the previous two editions, failed to reach the finals for the first time and lost the bronze medal match to Pakistan. In the 1988 AFC Asian Cup qualification, Bangladesh recorded three draws and two losses, failing to qualify from their group.

In the 1990 FIFA World Cup qualification, Bangladesh opened their campaign with a narrow 0–1 defeat to Thailand in Bangkok. In their next match, at the Dhaka Stadium, Rumman Bin Wali Sabbir missed a crucial penalty as Bangladesh fell 2–1 to Iran in front of 10,879 spectators. The team then suffered late defeats in the return fixtures against both Iran and China; notably, in Tehran, before a crowd of 50,000, they conceded the deciding goal to Samad Marfavi in the 81st minute. Bangladesh's only victory came at home, where they defeated Thailand 3–1 at the Dhaka Stadium.

Bangladesh won the 1989 President's Gold Cup in Dhaka, defeating Korea University 4–3 on penalties at Mirpur Stadium. Notably, Bangladesh was the only full national team to participate in that edition aside from India. Iranian Nasser Hejazi took charge of Bangladesh for the 1989 South Asian Games in Islamabad, Pakistan, and controversially dropped experienced players Sheikh Mohammad Aslam and Wasim Iqbal due to disciplinary issues. Bangladesh began the tournament with a convincing 3–0 victory over Sri Lanka and secured a place in the gold medal match after a 1–1 draw against India. However, the team finished as runners-up after losing 1–0 to Pakistan in the final. Following the tournament, the BFF imposed suspensions on several players, including captain Elias Hossain, effectively ending his international career.

=== Mixed results (1990–2000) ===
Bangladesh began the decade by participating in the 1990 Asian Games in Beijing, China, where they lost both of their group-stage matches, 0–4 to Saudi Arabia and 0–3 to Japan. In December 1991, they competed in the 1991 South Asian Games in Colombo, Sri Lanka, opening with a 0–1 defeat to Pakistan, their third consecutive loss to their rivals. They recovered in the next match with their first-ever victory against India, winning 2–1 thanks to a brace from Rizvi Karim Rumi, and finished second in their group to qualify for the bronze-medal match, where they defeated Nepal 2–0. The following year, in the 1992 AFC Asian Cup qualification in Bangkok, Thailand, Bangladesh finished bottom of their group after losing 0–6 to South Korea and 0–1 to Thailand.

In April 1993, Bangladesh began their participation in the 1994 FIFA World Cup qualification – AFC first round under coach Kazi Salahuddin. In their first match at the Tokyo National Stadium, Bangladesh was defeated 0–8 by hosts, Japan. The team performed in the same trend throughout the qualifiers, losing by big margins against both Thailand and UAE over two fixtures, and also losing 1–4 to Japan in the reverse fixture. Bangladesh's only victories came against Sri Lanka, winning 1–0 and 3–0 during their encounters, as the team finished second from bottom in their group. Ahead of the 1993 South Asian Games held on home soil, the BFF appointed Swiss coach Oldřich Šváb. Bangladesh responded with their worst finish in the tournament, finishing bottom of their group.

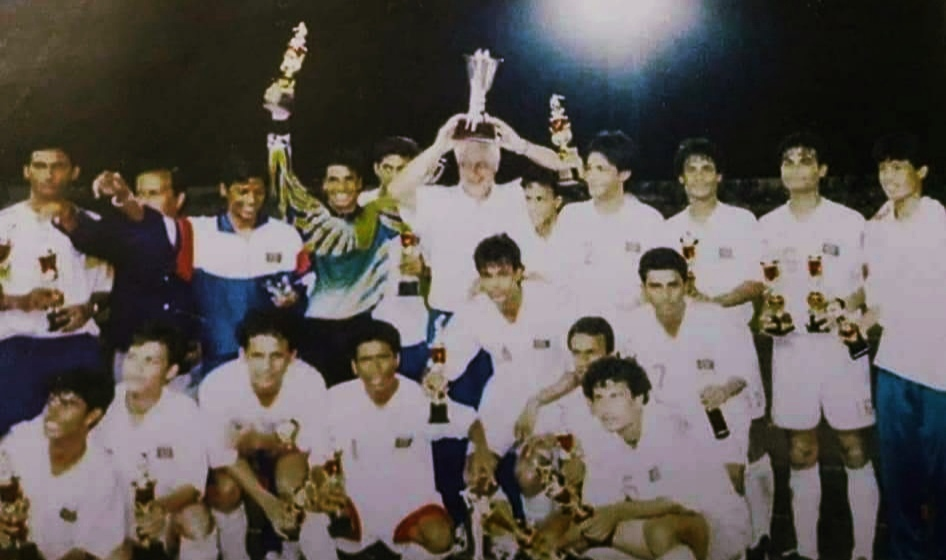
Bangladesh celebrating their 4-nation Tiger Trophy triumph in Myanmar, 1995.

Bangladesh's starting line-up in the 1999 South Asian Games final.

In March 1995, after missing the inaugural edition, Bangladesh participated in the 1995 SAARC Gold Cup in Colombo under coach Kang Man-young. They opened the tournament with their fourth successive defeat to Pakistan but rebounded with a 2–0 win over Nepal to reach the semi-finals, where they were eliminated by India on penalties at the Sugathadasa Stadium. In October 1995, German coach Otto Pfister took charge of the team, and from 26 October to 4 November 1995, he led them in the 4-nation Tiger Trophy in Yangon. Under the captaincy of Monem Munna, Bangladesh defeated hosts Myanmar 2–1 in the final, with goals from Mamun Joarder and Imtiaz Ahmed Nakib, securing the country's first international trophy. In December, the team competed in the 1995 South Asian Games in Madras, India, and lost 1–0 in the final to the hosts, earning their fourth silver medal and extending their 15-year run without a gold.

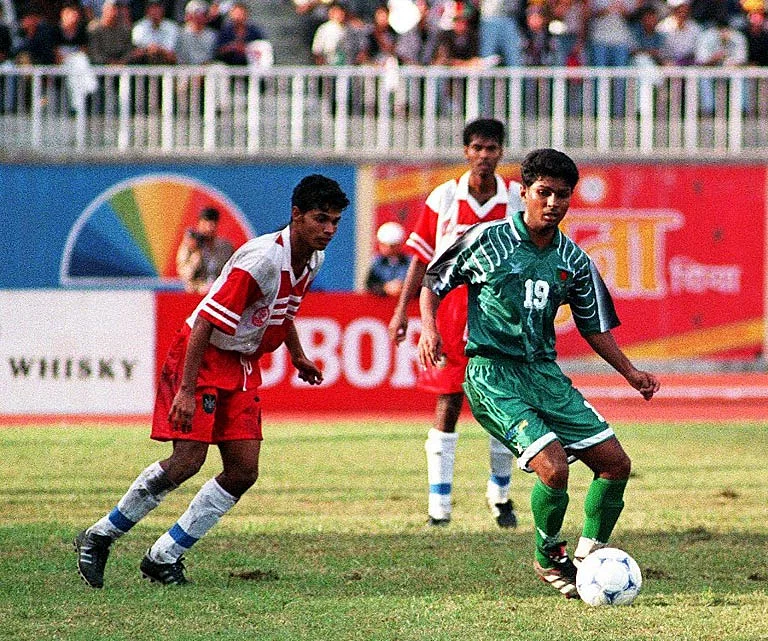
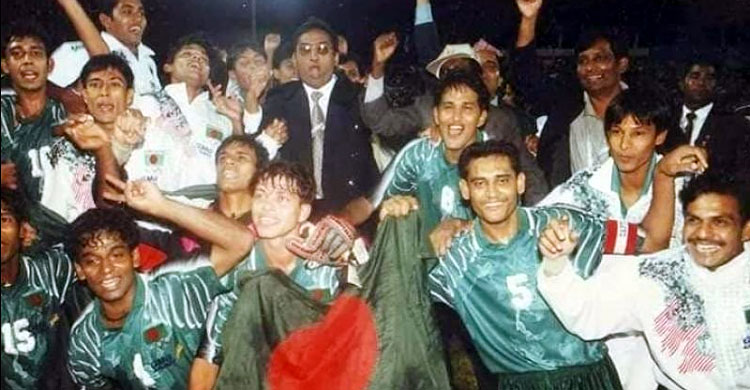
Scenes during the 1999 South Asian Games: against India in the semi-final (above); and after Bangladesh secured their maiden gold medal following triumph over hosts, Nepal, in the final (below).

In 1996, Bangladesh reached their highest-ever FIFA ranking of 110; nevertheless, the team remained inactive throughout the year and withdrew from the 1996 AFC Asian Cup qualification. From 16 to 31 March 1997, they took part in the 1998 FIFA World Cup qualification – AFC first round, held jointly in Shah Alam, Malaysia and Jeddah, Saudi Arabia. Bangladesh finished bottom of their group, with their only victory being a 2–1 win over Chinese Taipei. Pfister's departure was eventually confirmed later that year, following the Red and Green's failure to progress beyond the group stage of the 1997 SAFF Gold Cup in September.

In October 1998, former Iraqi international Samir Shaker was appointed head coach, and his first assignment came in the 1999 SAFF Gold Cup in Goa, India, held from 22 April to 1 May 1999. Bangladesh topped their group after a 0–0 draw against India and a 4–0 win over Pakistan, their first victory over the neighbours in 13 years. They then defeated Nepal 2–1 in the semi-finals to reach the tournament final for the first time; however, the team lost 0–2 to Baichung Bhutia-led India in the final at the Fatorda Stadium.

From 24 September to 4 October 1999, Bangladesh competed in the 1999 South Asian Games in Kathmandu, Nepal. Led by captain Jewel Rana, they opened with a 1–2 loss to the Maldives but topped their group after a 1–0 win over Sri Lanka in the next match. In the semi-final against India, Shahajuddin Tipu scored the only goal to secure the country's second-ever victory against the regional giants. In the final, held at the Dasharath Stadium on 4 October 1999, Alfaz Ahmed scored the decisive goal as Bangladesh defeated hosts Nepal 1–0 to end their 19-year, eight-edition wait for a gold medal.

In November 1999, the team concluded the millennium by participating in the 2000 AFC Asian Cup qualification held in Abu Dhabi, UAE, failing to progress, losing 0–6 against Uzbekistan, 0–3 to UAE, defeating Sri Lanka 3–1, and finishing the qualifiers with a 2–2 draw against India, after which Shaker departed, as one of the most successful coaches in the country's history, due to coaching license issues. In July 2000, Bangladesh played two friendly matches in England. Their first match was against English Division One team Huddersfield Town on 26 July in Birmingham, which ended in a 5–0 defeat. The team then suffered a defeat in their final friendly against India, losing 1–0 in a match held at Filbert Street in Leicester on 29 July. The Bangladesh team was reportedly paid an appearance fee of £10,000 for participating in these matches, marking the team's first European tour.

=== FIFA suspension and aftermath (2001–2010) ===
On 12 January 2001, Bangladesh played their first match against European opposition, facing Bosnia & Herzegovina in the Sahara Cup in India, where they lost 2–0. On 16 January, Firoj Mahmud Titu became the first Bangladeshi player to score against European opposition in a 4–1 defeat to FR Yugoslavia in the same competition. The team's results declined further, and they were eliminated in the first round of the 2002 FIFA World Cup qualifiers, winning one of four matches. On 11 January 2002, FIFA imposed a ban on Bangladesh due to government interference in the Bangladesh Football Federation, which violated FIFA and AFC statutes requiring a democratically elected committee. The ban was lifted on 11 February after the government reinstated the elected committee or BFF.

2003 South Asian Football Federation Gold Cup final starting line-up.

The 2003 SAFF Gold Cup, originally scheduled for 2002 but delayed a year due to the suspension of the BFF by FIFA, took place in Dhaka from 10 to 20 January 2003. Bangladesh finished top of their group to advance to the semi-final. They subsequently defeated defending champions India 2–1, with Motiur Munna scoring a golden goal in extra time. In the final, Hassan Al-Mamun replaced the suspended Rajani Kanta Barman as captain. Bangladesh drew 1–1 with Maldives after extra time, with Rokonuzzaman Kanchan scoring and Ali Umar equalising. Bangladesh won the penalty shootout 4–3, with Aminul Haque saving a penalty and Mohammed Sujan scoring the decisive kick, securing their first SAFF Championship.The victory marked the end of György Kottán's tenure as head coach, whose contract expired after the tournament, he had served since November 2000.

The 2004 AFC Asian Cup qualification began in March 2003. The team under newly appointed coach Hasanuzzaman Khan Bablu failed to qualify for the competition after suffering a defeat to Laos and a draw against Hong Kong. In November, during Golam Sarwar Tipu's fourth and final stint as head coach, Bangladesh lost 4–0 on aggregate against Tajikistan in the 2006 FIFA World Cup qualification – AFC first round, which resulted in their absence from international football for the entirety of 2004.

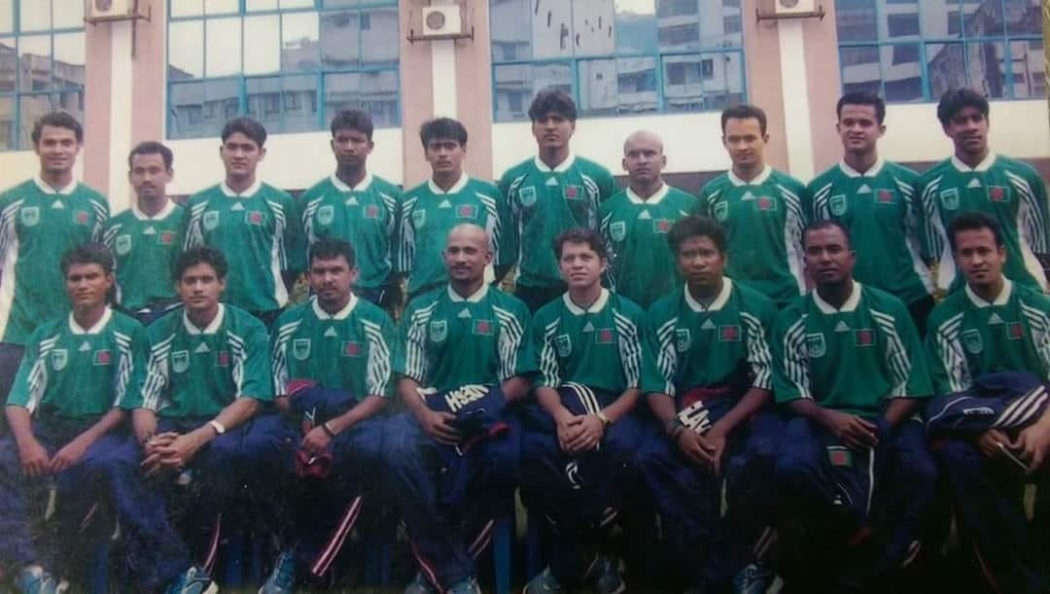
Bangladesh squad that took part in the 2005 SAFF Gold Cup in Karachi, Pakistan.

In August 2005, the BFF appointed Argentine head coach Diego Andrés Cruciani on a one-year contract. Cruciani led Bangladesh to the final of the 2005 SAFF Gold Cup in Karachi, Pakistan, where they lost to India by 2–0. In December 2005, the team participated in the preliminary round of the 2007 AFC Asian Cup qualification, defeating Pakistan 1–0 on aggregate to advance to the final qualifiers.

Amidst their Asian Cup qualification campaign, Bangladesh hosted the 2006 AFC Challenge Cup, and reached the quarter-finals, where they were defeated 6–1 by Tajikistan. Cruciani was eventually removed, following three consecutive losses in the final round of the 2007 AFC Asian Cup qualification. Interim coach Hasanuzzaman Bablu took charge for the remaining qualification matches, with Bangladesh losing all four games and finishing bottom of their group.

The team participated in the 2007 Nehru Cup in New Delhi, India, with Indian coach Syed Nayeemuddin, and finished second from the bottom in their group. Bangladesh was also eliminated in the first round of the 2010 FIFA World Cup qualification, losing 6–1 on aggregate to Tajikistan, leading to Nayeemuddin's dismissal. Bangladesh participated in the 2008 AFC Challenge Cup qualification and the 2008 SAFF Championship with coach Abu Yusuf and remained winless.

Bangladesh continued their winless run following participating in the 2008 Merdeka Cup and the 2008 Myanmar Challenge Cup, during Shafiqul Islam Manik's tenure. Under Brazilian coach Dido, Bangladesh secured qualification for the 2010 AFC Challenge Cup, and during the qualifiers, their 2–1 victory over Cambodia on 26 April 2009 ended a winless streak that had lasted over three years. Dido was sacked on 9 November, citing interference from the BFF in squad selection and internal team conflicts. Interim coach Shahidur Rahman Shantoo led Bangladesh to a semi-final elimination to India U23 in the 2009 SAFF Championship in Dhaka. In 2010, under interim coach Saiful Bari Titu, the team was eliminated in the group stage of the AFC Challenge Cup held in Colombo, Sri Lanka.

=== Decline (2011–2017) ===
Bangladesh failed to qualify for the 2012 AFC Challenge Cup under Croatian coach Robert Rubčić, leading to his dismissal. The BFF appointed Macedonian coach Nikola Ilievski just four days before the country's 2014 FIFA World Cup qualification – AFC first round match against Pakistan in Dhaka on 29 June 2011. Bangladesh won the first leg 3–0 on a waterlogged pitch at Bangabandhu National Stadium and advanced to the second round after a goalless draw in Lahore four days later. Drawn against Lebanon in the second round, Bangladesh lost the first leg 4–0 in Beirut. Despite being eliminated, they secured a 2–0 victory in the return leg in Dhaka. Ilievski's tenure ended following a group-stage exit from the 2011 SAFF Championship in New Delhi, India.

In 2013, the team competed in 2014 AFC Challenge Cup qualification under Dutch coach Lodewijk de Kruif, narrowly missing qualification. De Kruif remained in charge for the 2013 SAFF Championship in Kathmandu, Nepal, where Bangladesh was eliminated after finishing bottom of their group.

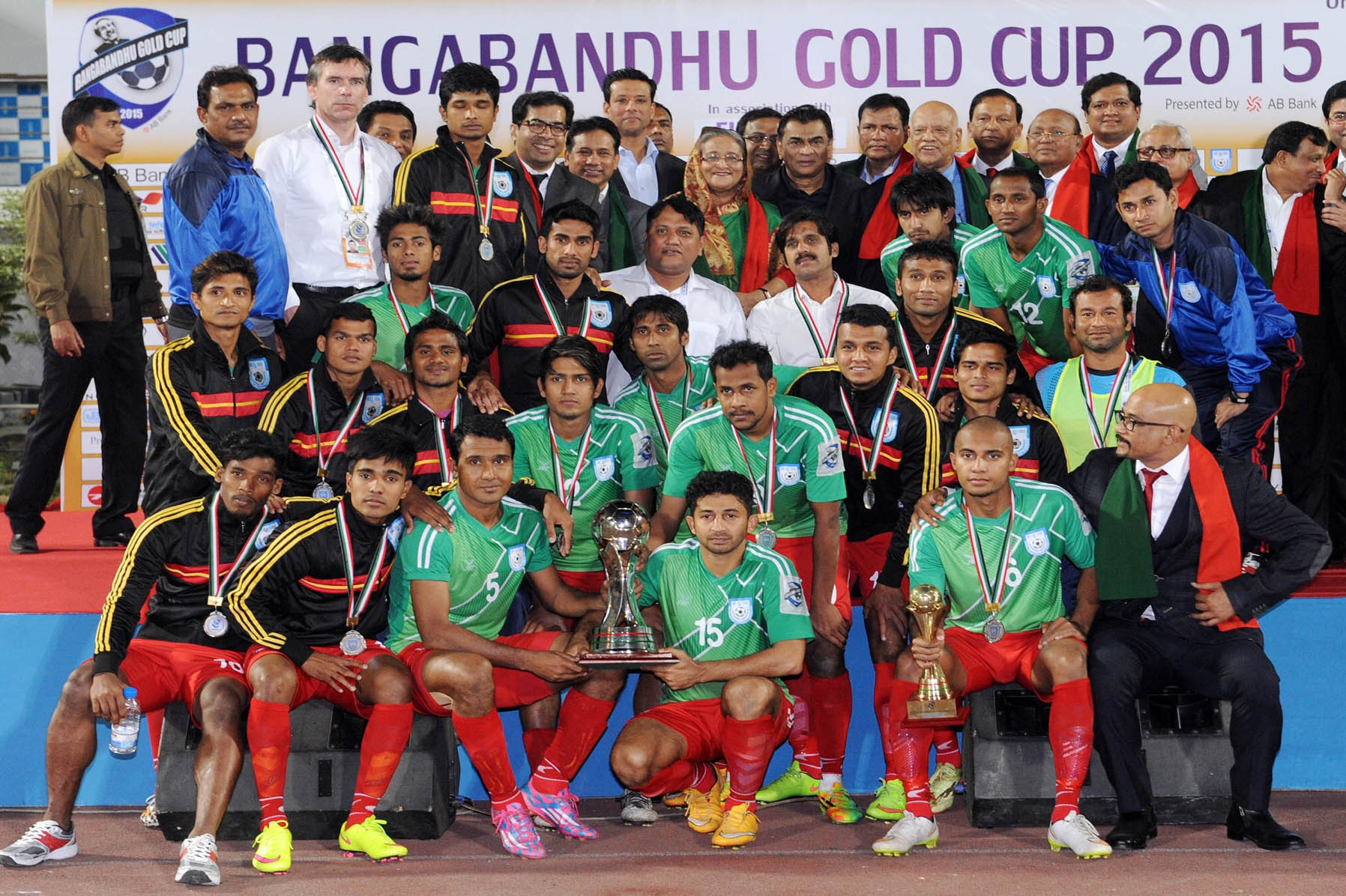
2015 Bangabandhu Cup runner-up Bangladesh team was feted by Prime Minister Sheikh Hasina (standing middle, top row).

De Kruif temporarily departed in October 2014, before returning to lead Bangladesh to a runner-up finish in the 2015 Bangabandhu Cup held in Dhaka, where they suffered a 3–2 defeat to the Malaysia Olympic team in the final. In June 2015, Bangladesh began their 2018 FIFA World Cup qualification campaign in the second round, where they were drawn into a group with Kyrgyzstan, Tajikistan, Australia and Jordan. The team suffered heavy defeats in all but one of their first four matches, managing a 1–1 draw against Tajikistan at the Bangabandhu National Stadium. De Kruif was subsequently replaced by Italian coach Fabio Lopez, under whom Bangladesh lost their next three matches, leading to his dismissal. Bangladesh, under Maruful Haque, also exited the 2015 SAFF Championship from the group stage. On 24 March 2016, the team played their final World Cup qualification match under Spanish coach Gonzalo Moreno, losing 8–0 to Jordan at the Amman International Stadium in Amman, Jordan, and finishing at the bottom of Group B.

In May 2016, De Kruif was reappointed as head coach to guide Bangladesh through the 2019 AFC Asian Cup qualification – play-off round against Tajikistan. Bangladesh lost the play-offs 6–0 on aggregate, and were relegated to the second round. On 29 June, the BFF appointed Belgian coach Tom Saintfiet on a short-term contract to oversee the team for the second-round matches against Bhutan. After a 0–0 draw in the first leg in Dhaka, Bangladesh was defeated 3–1 by Bhutan in the second leg at the Changlimithang Stadium in Thimphu. The result meant Bangladesh would not be a part of any AFC and FIFA-organised tournaments for the following two years. The team was absent from international football throughout 2017, and by February 2018, had dropped to 197th place in the FIFA Men's World Ranking, their all-time lowest.

=== Recent years (2018–present) ===
English coach, Jamie Day led the team to elimination from the 2018 SAFF Championship on home soil. However, Bangladesh progressed to the second round of the 2022 FIFA World Cup qualifiers by defeating Laos 1–0 on aggregate. Drawn into a group alongside India, Afghanistan, Oman, and Qatar, who had already qualified for the World Cup as host, their only point in the first phase came from a 1–1 draw against India at the Salt Lake Stadium in Kolkata. The second phase resumed in December 2020 in a centralised hub in Qatar due to the COVID-19 pandemic. Bangladesh collected one point from their remaining four matches, drawing 1–1 with Afghanistan. Despite finishing bottom of Group E, they advanced to the 2023 AFC Asian Cup qualifiers as one of the best fifth-placed teams.

In March 2021, Bangladesh finished as runners-up in the 2021 Three Nations Cup (Nepal). In September 2021, following a series of poor results, Day was placed on temporary leave ahead of the 2021 SAFF Championship, where the team was eliminated in the first round under interim coach Óscar Bruzón.

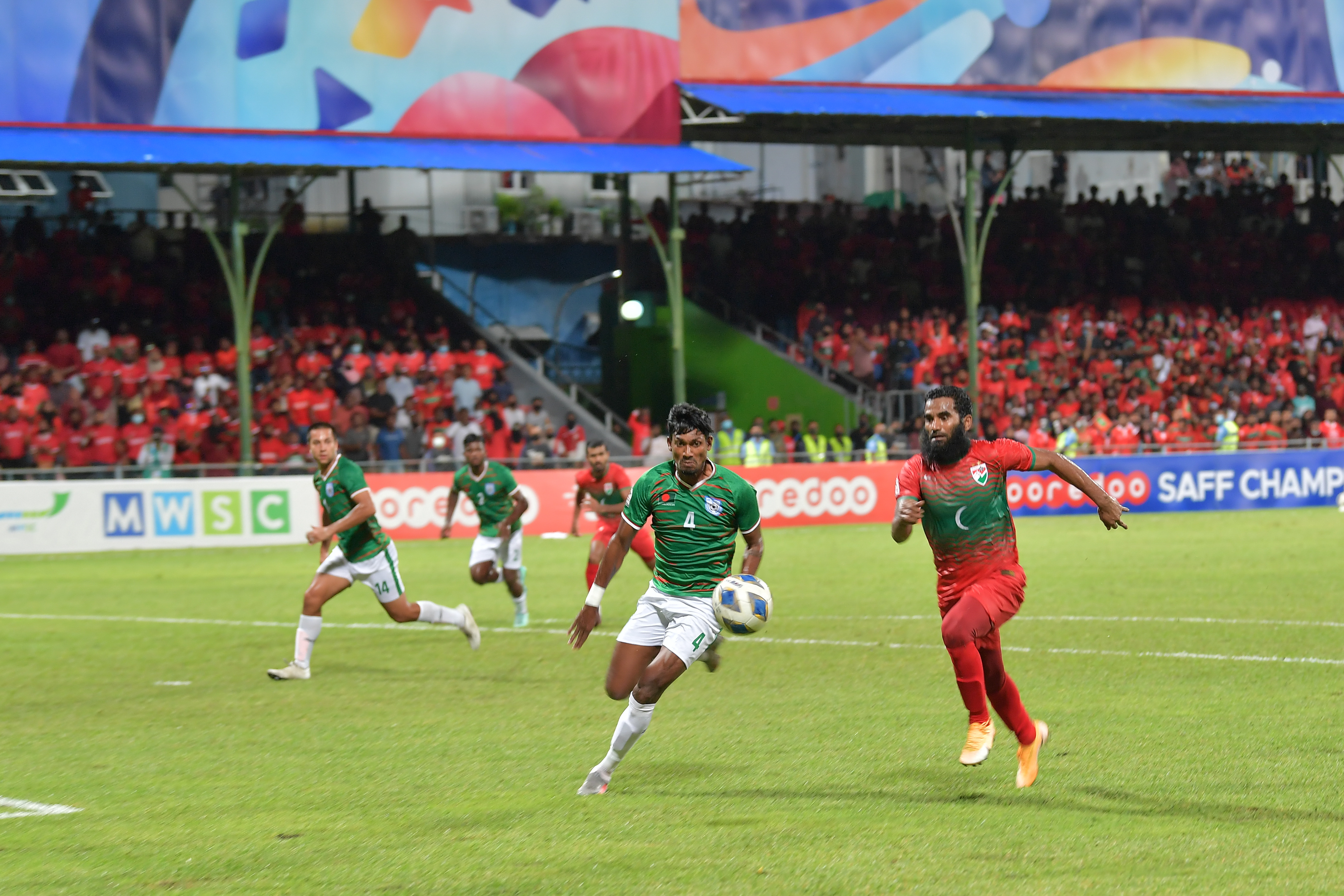
Bangladesh against Maldives at the 2021 SAFF Championship.

Under Spanish coach Javier Cabrera, the team was eliminated from the 2023 AFC Asian Cup qualification – third round after suffering defeats in all three games. At the 2023 SAFF Championship in Bengaluru, India, Bangladesh reached the semi-finals for the first time in six editions, but were eliminated by Kuwait after conceding in extra time. In the 2026 FIFA World Cup qualification – AFC first round, Bangladesh defeated Maldives 2–1 on aggregate.

In the 2026 FIFA World Cup qualification – AFC second round, Bangladesh was drawn into a group with Australia, Lebanon and Palestine, losing all of their matches except for a 1–1 home draw against Lebanon. Despite limited improvement in the team's standing ahead of the 2027 AFC Asian Cup qualification – third round, the BFF extended Cabrera's contract until 2026, making him the longest-serving head coach in the country's history. During the qualification campaign, Bangladesh introduced several diaspora players, including Shamit Shome, Zayyan Ahmed, Fahamedul Islam and Leicester City midfielder Hamza Choudhury. However, the team failed to qualify after finishing third in their group with two draws and three defeats, despite recording a notable 1–0 victory over regional rivals India, their first in 22 years.

== Team image ==
=== Kit ===
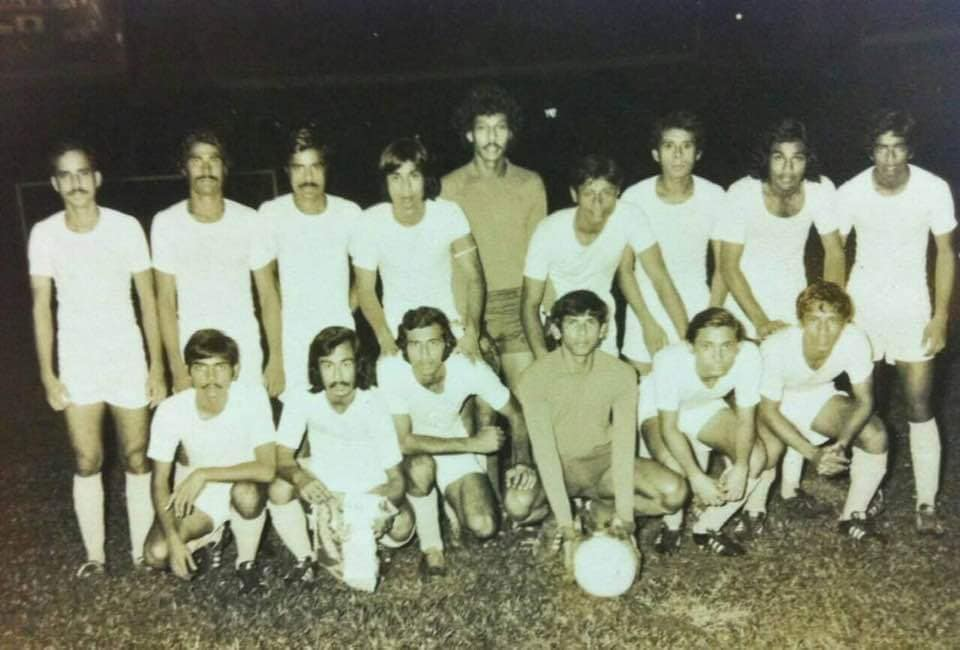
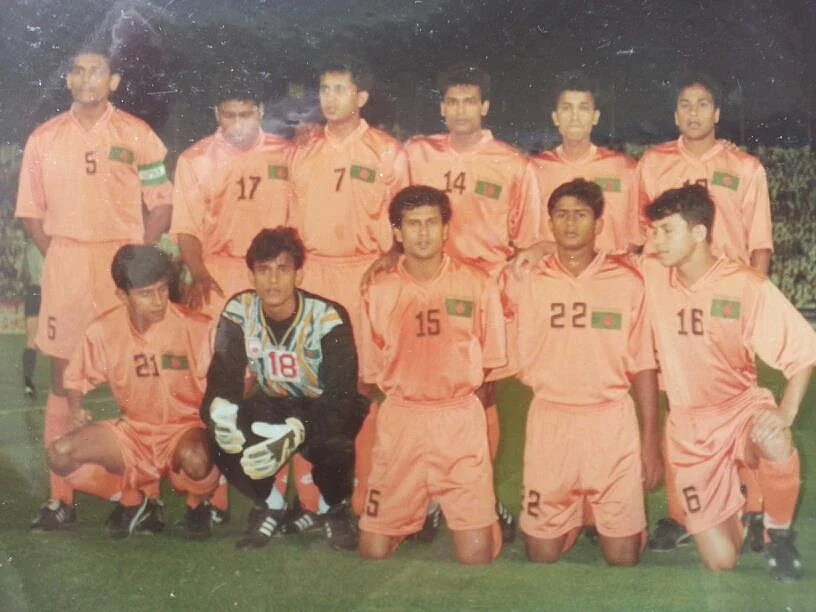
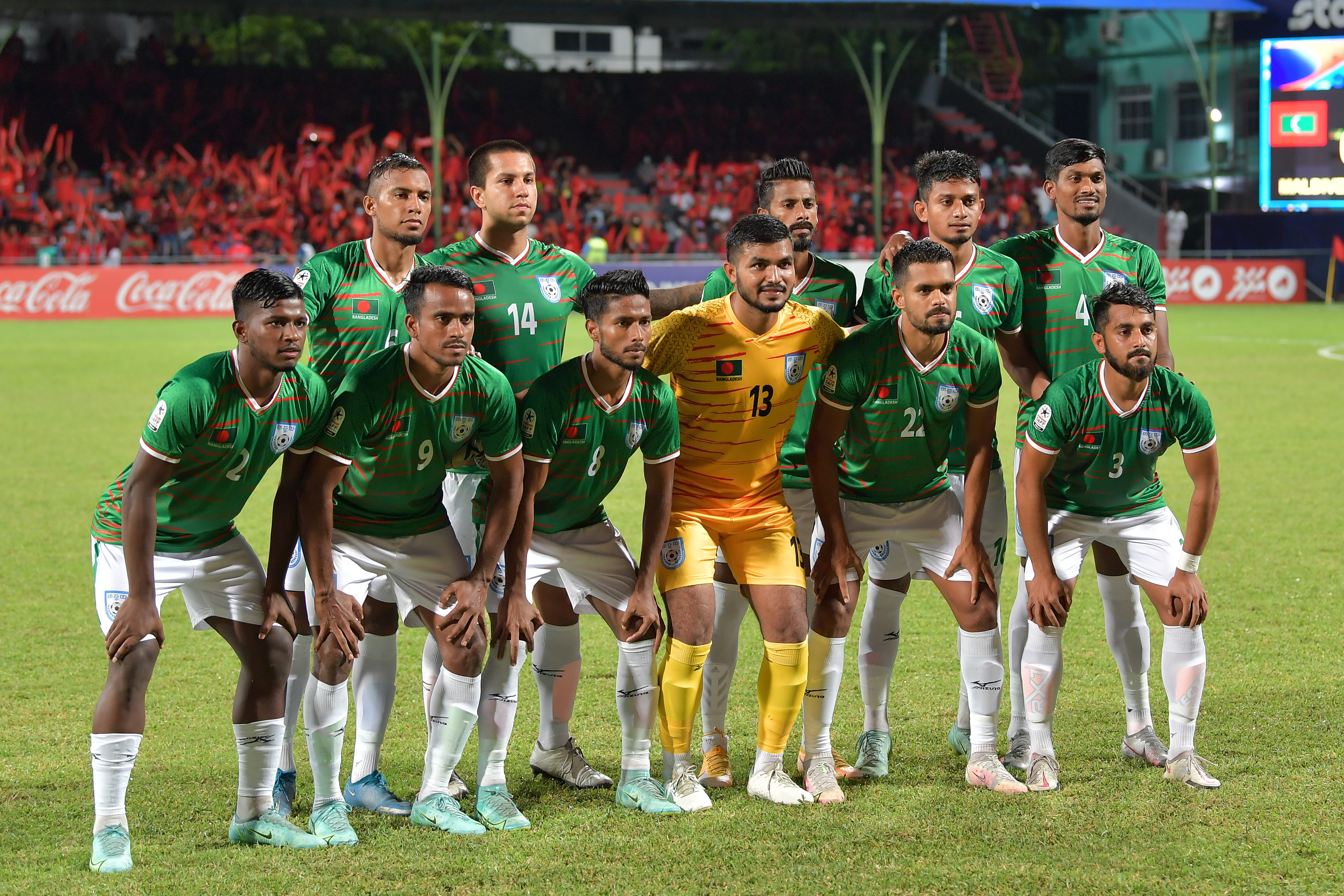
Transition of home kits from 1975 Merdeka Cup (top), 1998 FIFA World Cup qualifiers (middle) and 2021 SAFF Championship (bottom).

The national team has traditionally alternated between green-red, white, and orange home jerseys, while the away or secondary kit has varied between red, white, and orange. Prior to the turn of the century, the team featured the national flag of Bangladesh (dark green background with red circle) on their jerseys, after which they switched to using the BFF logo.

In the team's inaugural year, Bangladesh participated in the 1973 Merdeka Cup in Malaysia, wearing white shirts and shorts with black socks. During the 1980 AFC Asian Cup qualification Group 2, held in Dhaka, Bangladesh played their first official home matches, sporting maroon shirts paired with white shorts and matching socks. In the main round, the team wore orange shirts with white shorts and orange socks, while also using a secondary kit consisting of red shirts with white shorts and socks.

Between 1980 and 1999, the team's primary kit alternated between orange, green, and white shirts. Following the turn of the century, Bangladesh predominantly adopted a traditional red and green home kit, although during their 2003 SAFF Gold Cup triumph, they notably wore blue and white shirts with red shoulder stripes, complemented by white shorts and socks.

Bangladesh wore kits manufactured by Adidas during the periods 1998, 2005–2007, and 2013–2014. During their 1999 South Asian Games gold medal triumph, the team wore green FBT shirts with white shoulder stripes, green shorts, and green socks. During their tour of England in 2000, the team's jerseys were produced by Sapphire Sports.

In April 2009, Nokia, in its second year as the national team's sponsor, became the team's jersey sponsor as part of the renewed agreement. As the team had been using the same kit for nearly five years, the federation organized a jersey design contest ahead of the 2021 SAFF Championship. Grand Sport Group manufactured the team's kits for the 2010 AFC Challenge Cup.

In 2015, the team used green home kits and red away kits produced by FBT for the 2015 Bangabandhu Cup and the 2018 FIFA World Cup qualification – AFC second round. For the 2016 Bangabandhu Cup, Bangladesh wore kits made by Lotto Sport Italia.

On 11 February 2025, after a decade without a kit sponsor, the BFF signed a two-year deal with the local sportswear manufacturer Dour. This agreement saw Bangladesh reintroduce white shirts incorporating traditional Jamdani motifs, along with white shorts and socks. Additionally, the English typography of "Bangladesh" was stylized into the shape of the country's map and displayed on the back of both the home and away jerseys.

==== Kit suppliers ====
Period	Kit Manufacturer	Ref
1973–1998	N/A	
1998	(Germany) Adidas	
1999	(Thailand) FBT	
2000–2001	(United Kingdom) Sapphire Sports	
2001–2004	None	
2005–2007	(Germany) Adidas	
2008–2009	None	
2010	(Thailand) Grand Sport	
2011–2012	None	
2013–2014	(Germany) Adidas	
2015	(Thailand) FBT	
2016	(Italy) Lotto	
2016–2025	None	
2025–present	(Bangladesh) Dour	

=== Sponsors ===
The national team was sponsored by Nokia for a two-year period from 2008 to 2010. On 8 June 2019, India's TVS Motor Company announced its two-year sponsorship tie-up with BFF, sponsoring the national team during the 2018 FIFA World Cup qualification – AFC second round. On 15 March 2026, United Commercial Bank signed a five-year deal to sponsor the men's senior national team.

=== Bangladesh B ===
The President's Gold Cup was an annual football tournament held in Dhaka, Bangladesh, primarily from 1981 to 1993. During this period, the BFF often entered two teams: Bangladesh Red and Green (1981–1986; 1993) and Bangladesh White and Blue (1987). Secondary teams were generally composed of youth or reserve players. Many participating teams used the tournament as a platform for developmental or non-senior squads. Fielding multiple national sides was common among South Asian countries during the 1980s and 1990s, with Nepal (Nepal B) and Pakistan (Pakistan B) also operating second-string team's.

In the 1989 edition, Bangladesh Red, consisting of senior international players, won the tournament by defeating the Korea University football team on penalties after eliminating Bangladesh Green (junior team) in the semi-finals. The victory is not recognized as Bangladesh's first international trophy, as the competition primarily featured club sides. In the 1987 edition, Bangladesh White and Blue participated, with the White team mainly drawn from Mohammedan and the Blue team from Dhaka Abahani. However, the World Football Elo Ratings recognize the White team as the senior national team.

=== Home stadium ===
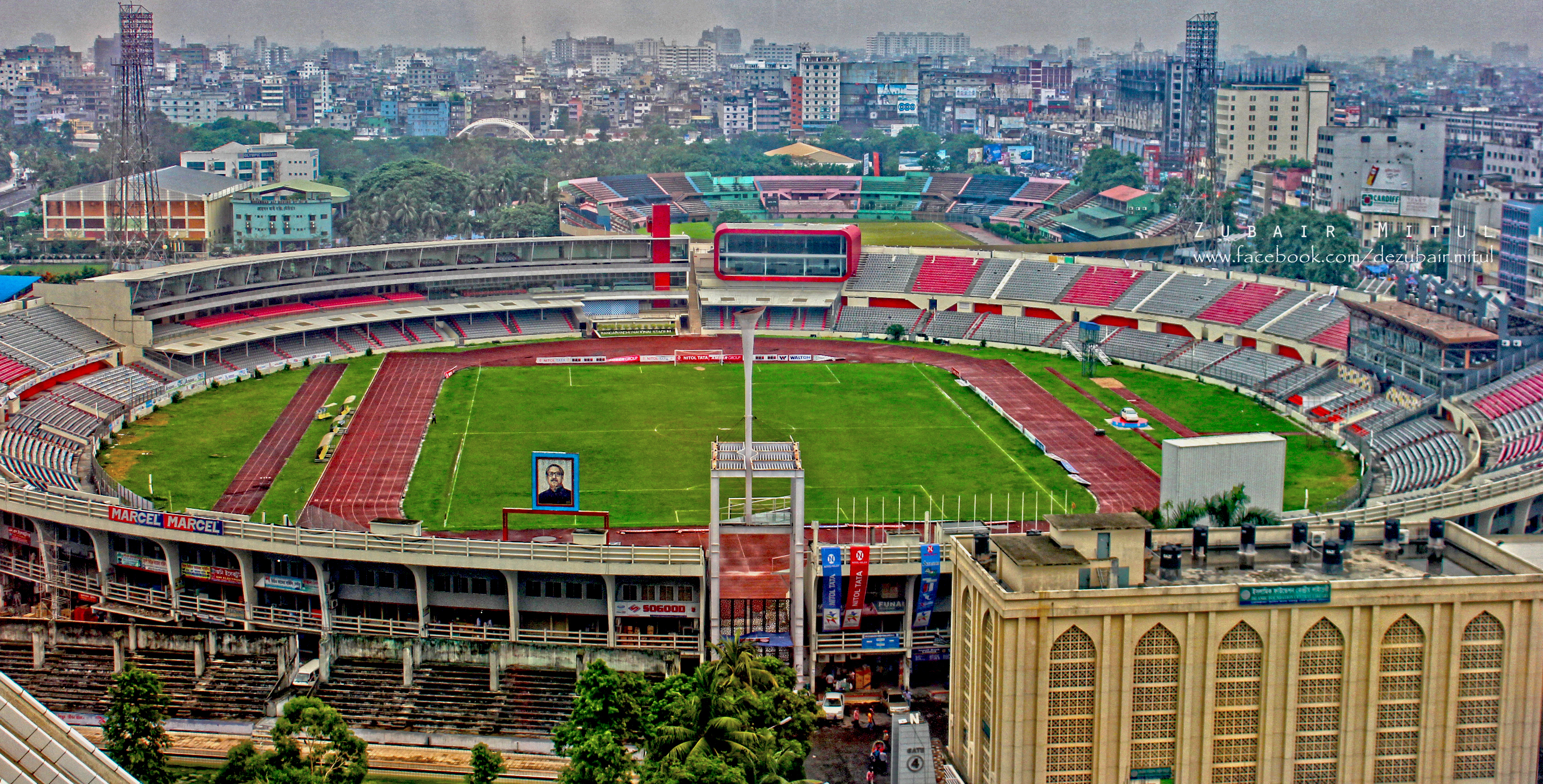
National Stadium, Dhaka

The Bangladesh team plays the majority of its home matches at the National Stadium in Dhaka. Built in 1954, it was one of the venues used by the Pakistan national team for home matches prior to the independence of Bangladesh. Bangladesh played its first home match at the stadium against Afghanistan in a 1980 AFC Asian Cup qualification match, which ended in a 2–2 draw, with Mohammad Abdul Halim scoring both goals for Bangladesh.

In 1988, the Mirpur Stadium was constructed exclusively for football and hosted the 1989 and 1993 editions of the President's Gold Cup. However, following a prolonged dispute between the BFF and the BCB, the National Stadium was allocated solely to the BFF, while the BCB assumed control of the Mirpur Stadium at the end of the 2004–05 season.

The National Stadium has hosted the 2003, 2009, and 2018 editions of the SAFF Championship, and was also one of the venues for the 2006 AFC Challenge Cup. Prior to renovations in 2011, the stadium had a capacity of nearly 55,000. This was reduced to 36,000 after redevelopment, and further decreased to 22,400 following renovations carried out between 2021 and 2025.

Occasionally, home matches are also held at the Nilphamari Stadium in Nilphamari, the Sylhet District Stadium in Sylhet, the Rajshahi District Stadium in Rajshahi, the Cox's Bazar Stadium in Cox's Bazar, the Shamsul Huda Stadium in Jessore, and the Bashundhara Kings Arena in Dhaka.

=== Supporters ===
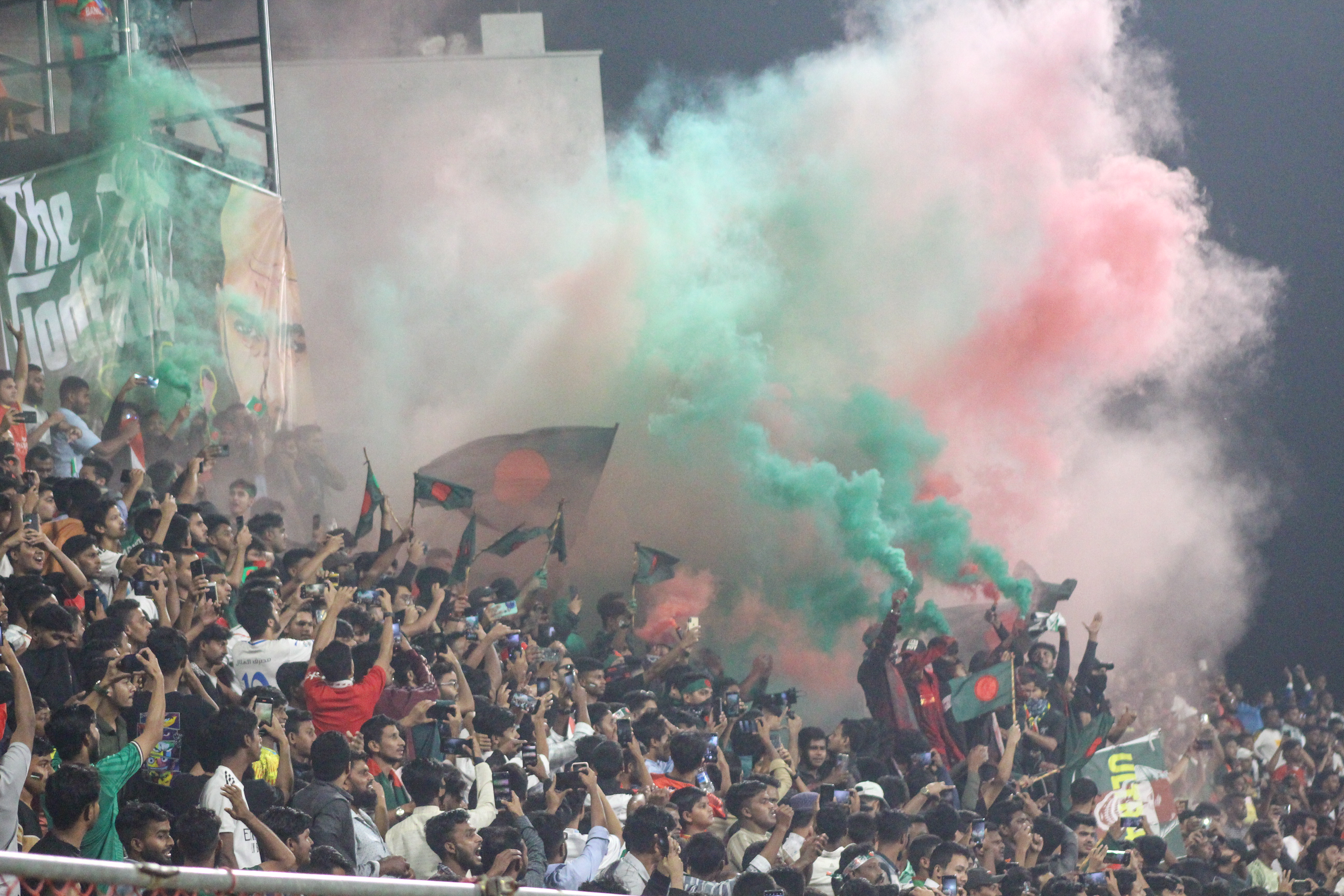
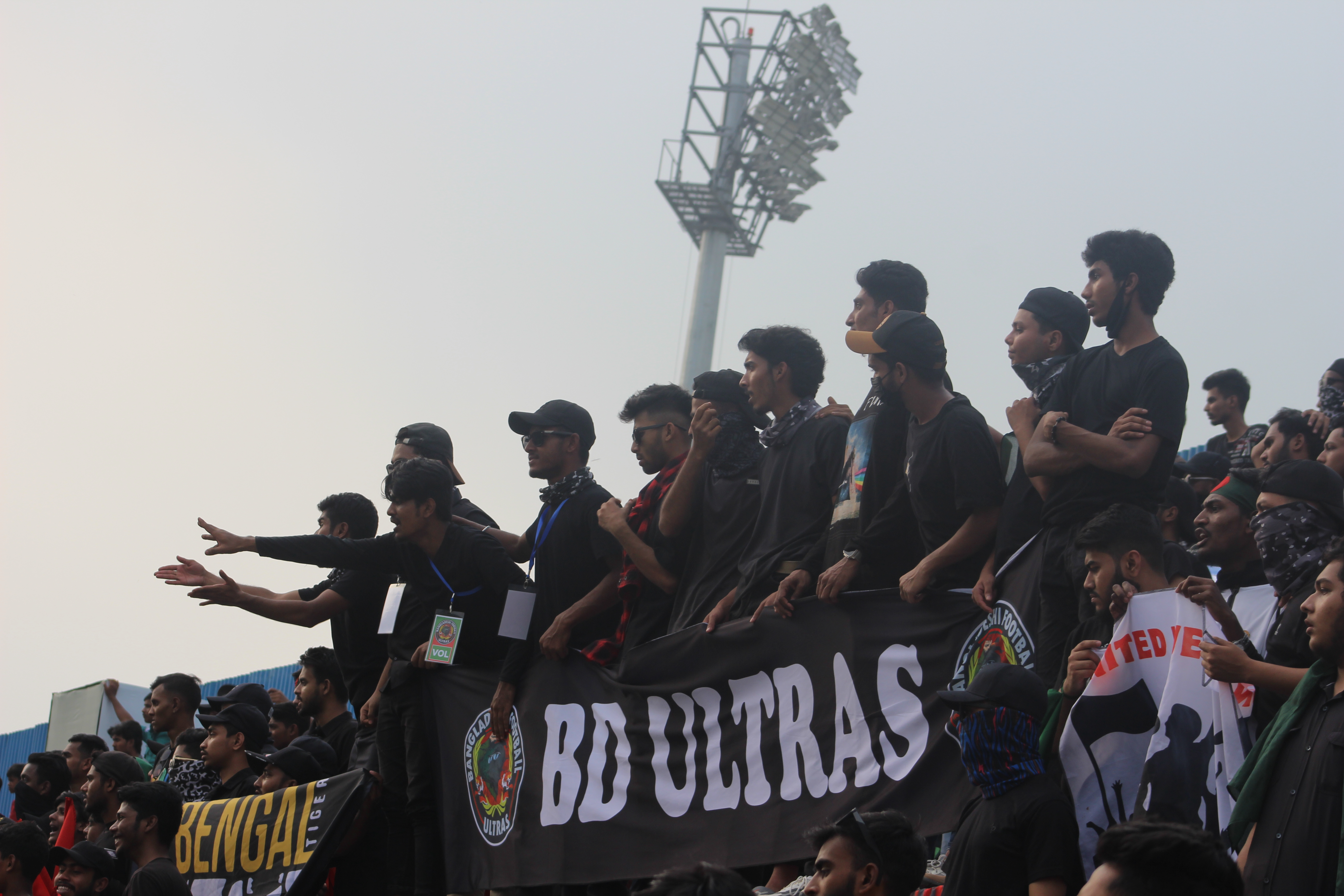
Bangladesh football fans at the Bashundhara Kings Arena during the 2026 FIFA World Cup qualification match against Lebanon (above) and Palestine (below)

The Dhaka derby between Mohammedan and Dhaka Abahani has historically drawn higher attendances than many national team fixtures. However, the 2003 SAFF Gold Cup held at the National Stadium, Dhaka, recorded large crowds, including approximately 55,000 spectators for the match against Nepal and around 46,000 for the final against Maldives.

Football matches in other parts of the country have also attracted significant attendances relative to stadium capacity. In 2014, a friendly between the Bangladesh U23 and Nepal U23 at the Sylhet District Stadium drew an estimated 50,000 spectators, exceeding typical capacity levels. More than 10,000 spectators reportedly forced entry through the stadium gate and entered the field after finding no available space in the 25,000 capacity gallery, initially leading both teams to refuse to play. Eventually, spectators were accommodated along the sidelines under police supervision. In the same year, the Shamsul Huda Stadium in Jessore, which has a listed capacity of 12,000, hosted more than 30,000 spectators during a friendly against Sri Lanka.

Interest in national team fixtures increased in subsequent years, particularly following the inclusion of diaspora players such as Hamza Choudhury and Shamit Shome, with strong demand for tickets reported for competitive matches. During a 2026 FIFA World Cup qualification – AFC second round home fixture against Hong Kong, approximately 19,000 tickets were sold out within 24 minutes of release. In the same qualification cycle, tickets for the home game against India were reported to have sold out rapidly, with general seating allocations being exhausted within about 6 minutes of going on sale. This heightened demand led to a November 2025 proposal by the National Sports Council to construct a dedicated football stadium in Purbachal, aimed at reducing reliance on the National Stadium, which, following renovations (2021–2025), has a reduced capacity of 22,400.

Organised supporter activity includes the Bangladeshi Football Ultras, established in 2019, which supports the men's, women's, and youth national teams.

== Results and fixtures ==
The following is a list of match results in the last 12 months, as well as any future matches that have been scheduled.

Win Draw Loss Fixture

=== 2026 ===
26 March 2026 Friendly	Vietnam	3–0	Bangladesh	Hanoi, Vietnam
18:00 UTC+6	Phạm Tuấn Hải 8'; Phạm Xuân Mạnh 18'; Nguyễn Hai Long 38'	Report		Stadium: Hàng Đẫy Stadium; Referee: Cheung Wai Lung Mario (Hong Kong)

31 March 2026 2027 ACQ – 3R	Singapore	1–0	Bangladesh	Kallang, Singapore
18:00 UTC+6	H. Stewart 31'	Report; Report (AFC)		Stadium: National Stadium; Attendance: 30,105; Referee: Ben Abraham (Australia)

5 June 2026 Friendly	San Marino	1–2	Bangladesh	Serravalle, San Marino
19:00 CEST (23:00 BST)	Giacopetti 31'	GSA; UEFA	T. Barman 19', 86'	Stadium: San Marino Stadium; Attendance: 2,934; Referee: Walter Altmann (Austria)

8 September 2026 Hybrid friendly	Bangladesh	2–0	(Bangladesh) City Club	Dhaka, Bangladesh
	Morsalin; Emon	Report		Stadium: Bashundhara Kings Arena

11 September 2026 Hybrid friendly	Bangladesh	0–1	(Bangladesh) Fortis	Dhaka, Bangladesh
		Report	Chukwude	Stadium: Bashundhara Kings Arena

25 September 2026 2026 FIFA ASEAN Cup Group A	Bangladesh	0–3	Malaysia	Jakarta, Indonesia
15:00 MYT (14:00 BST)		Report	Arif Aiman 18', 38'; Bérgson 53'	Stadium: Gelora Bung Karno Stadium; Referee: Resul Mammedow (Turkmenistan)

28 September 2026 2026 FIFA ASEAN Cup Group A	Singapore	1–0	Bangladesh	Jakarta, Indonesia
15:00 MYT (14:00 BST)	H. Stewart 35'	Report		Stadium: Gelora Bung Karno Stadium; Referee: Mongkolchai Pechsri (Thailand)

1 October 2026 2026 FIFA ASEAN Cup Group A	Indonesia	9–2	Bangladesh	Jakarta, Indonesia
17:30 MYT (16:30 BST)	Baker 11', 20', 37', 42', 90+7'; Ridho 32'; Hubner 45+1'; Vickery 90'; Diks 90+6'	Report	Emon 36'; Wahid 90+1'	Stadium: Gelora Bung Karno Stadium; Referee: Nasrullo Kabirov (Tajikistan)

5 November 2026 2026 SAFF Championship GS	Bhutan	0–1	Bangladesh	Dhaka, Bangladesh
20:00 UTC+6		SAFF; FIFA	Ibrahim 69'	Stadium: National Stadium; Attendance: 12,783; Referee: Thoriq Alkatiri (Indonesia)

11 November 2026 2026 SAFF Championship GS	Bangladesh	4–0	Sri Lanka	Dhaka, Bangladesh
20:00 UTC+6	Shome 8'; Choudhury 44'; Wahid 53'; Rakib 87'	SAFF; FIFA		Stadium: National Stadium; Attendance: 18,631; Referee: Lê Vũ Linh (Vietnam)

14 November 2026 2026 SAFF; Championship SF	Bangladesh	0–1	Pakistan	Dhaka, Bangladesh
20:00		SAFF; FIFA	Arshad 86'	Stadium: National Stadium; Attendance: 21,983; Referee: Ngô Duy Lân (Vietnam)

== Coaching staff ==
As of 29 October 2026.

Position	Name
Head coach	(United States) Thomas Dooley
Assistant coach	(Germany) Reinhard Stumpf
Assistant coach	(Vietnam) Nguyễn Hoàng Lân
Assistant coach	(Bangladesh) Hassan Al-Mamun
Goalkeeping coach	(Germany) Kristián Barbuščák
Fitness coach	(Uruguay) Rafael Terra Campos
Team manager	(Bangladesh) Amirul Islam Babu
Team leader	(Bangladesh) Iqbal Hossain
Media manager	(Bangladesh) Amer Khan
Physio	(Germany) David Nikolaus Guschl
Physio	(Bangladesh) Abu-Sufian Sarkar
Doctor	(Bangladesh) Md. Saleh Uddin Mahmood
Team attendant	(Bangladesh) Md Mohsin
Video analyst	(Bangladesh) Abdullah Nasif Islam

== Players ==
=== Current squad ===
The following 28 players were named in the squad for the 2026 SAFF Championship.

Ronan Sullivan withdrew due to injury on 1 October 2026. Isa Faysal was also dropped from the squad on 2 November. Md Taj Uddin and Abdullah Omar Sajib were called up as replacements.

Caps and goals are correct as of 14 November 2026 after the game against Pakistan.

No.	Pos.	Player	Date of birth (age)	Caps	Goals	Club
1	GK	Mehedi Hasan Srabon	12 August 2005 (age 21)	9	0	(Bangladesh Football Federation) Bashundhara Kings
13	GK	Mitul Marma	11 December 2003 (age 22)	21	0	(Bangladesh Football Federation) Dhaka Abahani
18	GK	Sujon Hossain	5 August 1996 (age 30)	1	0	(Bangladesh Football Federation) Mohammedan
2	DF	Zidane Yousuf	22 September 2007 (age 19)	6	0	Free agent
3	DF	Rahmat Mia	8 December 1999 (age 26)	43	0	(Bangladesh Football Federation) Mohammedan
4	DF	Topu Barman (captain)	20 December 1994 (age 31)	70	8	(Bangladesh Football Federation) Bashundhara Kings
12	DF	Bishwanath Ghosh	30 May 1999 (age 27)	48	0	(Bangladesh Football Federation) Bashundhara Kings
14	DF	Tariq Kazi	6 October 2000 (age 26)	44	2	(Bhutan Football Federation) Paro
19	DF	Zayyan Ahmed	29 January 2004 (age 22)	13	0	(United Arab Emirates Football Association) Rimal Al-Sahra
22	DF	Md Saad Uddin	1 September 1998 (age 28)	54	2	(Bangladesh Football Federation) Mohammedan
24	DF	Abdullah Omar Sajib	17 October 2002 (age 24)	0	0	(Bangladesh Football Federation) Dhaka Abahani
25	DF	Md Taj Uddin	5 January 2005 (age 21)	4	0	(Bangladesh Football Federation) Dhaka Abahani
5	MF	Md Ridoy	1 January 2002 (age 24)	29	0	(Bangladesh Football Federation) Bashundhara Kings
6	MF	Jamal Bhuyan	10 April 1990 (age 36)	99	1	(Bangladesh Football Federation) Brothers Union
7	MF	Shekh Morsalin	19 February 2005 (age 21)	26	7	(Bangladesh Football Federation) Dhaka Abahani
8	MF	Hamza Choudhury	1 October 1997 (age 29)	15	5	(The Football Association) Sheffield United
16	MF	Md Sohel Rana	1 June 1996 (age 30)	25	0	(Bangladesh Football Federation) Mohammedan
17	MF	Sohel Rana	27 March 1995 (age 31)	83	1	(Bangladesh Football Federation) Bashundhara Kings
21	MF	Quazem Shah	25 October 1998 (age 28)	11	0	(Bangladesh Football Federation) Bashundhara Kings
23	MF	Shamit Shome	5 September 1997 (age 29)	14	2	(United States Soccer Federation) New York Cosmos
9	FW	Shuki Itofusa	31 March 2004 (age 22)	5	0	(Bangladesh Football Federation) Fortis
10	FW	Rakib Hossain	18 November 1998 (age 28)	56	7	(Bangladesh Football Federation) Bashundhara Kings
11	FW	Foysal Ahmed Fahim	24 February 2002 (age 24)	36	1	(Bangladesh Football Federation) Mohammedan
15	FW	Fahamedul Islam	30 June 2006 (age 20)	11	0	(Italian Football Federation) Sestri Levante
20	FW	Farhaan Ali Wahid	9 December 2006 (age 19)	4	2	(The Football Association) Boreham Wood
26	FW	Mahe Khan	2 November 2007 (age 19)	0	0	(The Football Association) Moulton
27	FW	Mohammad Ibrahim	7 August 1997 (age 29)	45	5	(Bangladesh Football Federation) Fortis
28	FW	Minhazul Karim Shadin	10 March 2002 (age 24)	2	0	(Bangladesh Football Federation) Chattogram City

=== Recent call-ups ===
The following players have also been called up to the Bangladesh squad within the last twelve months.

Pos.	Player	Date of birth (age)	Caps	Goals	Club	Latest call-up
GK	Anisur Rahman Zico	10 August 1997 (age 29)	30	0	(Bangladesh) Mohammedan	2026 FIFA ASEAN Cup^{PRE}
GK	Saif Kerawala	23 July 1997 (age 29)	0	0	(United States) Washington Athletic	2026 FIFA ASEAN Cup^{PRE}
GK	Pappu Hossain	7 April 1999 (age 27)	0	0	(Bangladesh) Bashundhara Kings	v. Nepal; 13 November 2025^{PRE}
GK	Ishaque Akando	15 July 2003 (age 23)	0	0	(Bangladesh) City Club	2026 SAFF Championship^{TRP}
GK	Md Asif	20 October 2006 (age 20)	0	0	Bangladesh Police	2026 SAFF Championship^{TRP}
DF	Isa Faysal	20 August 1999 (age 27)	16	0	Bangladesh Police	2026 SAFF Championship^{PRE}
DF	Monjurur Rahman Manik	5 September 1996 (age 30)	1	0	(Bangladesh) Fortis	2026 FIFA ASEAN Cup
DF	Md Shakil Ahad Topu	6 April 2006 (age 20)	13	0	(Bangladesh) Mohammedan	2026 FIFA ASEAN Cup
DF	Shakil Hossain	6 July 2002 (age 24)	10	0	(Bangladesh) Dhaka Abahani	2026 FIFA ASEAN Cup^{PRE}
DF	Yasar Tahmid	14 February 2002 (age 24)	0	0	(Romania) Someșul Odoreu	2026 FIFA ASEAN Cup^{PRE}
MF	Yusuf Ahmed	11 November 2006 (age 20)	0	0	(England) Stourbridge	2026 FIFA ASEAN Cup^{PRE}
MF	Cuba Mitchell	23 November 2005 (age 20)	1	0	(England) Barwell	v. India; 18 November 2025
FW	Sumon Reza	15 June 1995 (age 31)	29	1	(Bangladesh) Chattogram City	v. Singapore; 28 September 2026
FW	Shahriar Emon	7 March 2001 (age 25)	14	1	(Bangladesh) Mohammedan	2026 FIFA ASEAN Cup
FW	Sourav Dewan	26 March 2001 (age 25)	0	0	(Bangladesh) Mohammedan	2026 FIFA ASEAN Cup^{PRE}
FW	Md Rafiqul Islam	12 February 2004 (age 22)	8	0	(Bangladesh) City Club	2026 FIFA ASEAN Cup^{PRE}
FW	Debajit Sarkar	17 June 2007 (age 19)	0	0	(Italy) ASD Sarnese 1926	2026 FIFA ASEAN Cup^{PRE}
FW	Md Rabby Hossen Rahul	30 December 2006 (age 19)	2	0	Bangladesh Police	2026 FIFA ASEAN Cup^{PRE}
FW	Mirajul Islam	1 October 2006 (age 20)	3	0	(Bangladesh) Dhaka Abahani	v. San Marino; 5 June 2026^{PRE}
FW	Murshed Ali	20 December 2008 (age 17)	0	0	(Bangladesh) Fortis	v. Nepal; 13 November 2025
FW	Al-Amin	29 March 2004 (age 22)	2	0	(Bangladesh) Dhaka Abahani	v. Nepal; 13 November 2025^{SUS}
FW	Ronan Sullivan	28 November 2007 (age 18)	0	0	(United States) Saint Joseph's Hawks	2026 SAFF Championship^{INJ}
^{INJ} Withdrew due to injury^{PRE} Preliminary squad / standby^{SUS} Serving suspension^{WD} Player withdrew from the squad due to non-injury issue.: ^{TRP} Invited as a Training player

== Player records ==
As of 14 November 2026.
Players in bold are still active with Bangladesh.

=== Most appearances ===
Jamal Bhuyan is Bangladesh's most capped player with 99 appearances.

Rank	Player	Caps	Goals	Career
1	**Jamal Bhuyan**	99	1	2013–present
2	**Sohel Rana**	83	1	2013–present
3	**Topu Barman**	70	8	2014–present
4	Rajani Kanta Barman	68	0	1997–2009
5	Mamunul Islam	67	3	2008–2020
6	Zahid Hasan Ameli	64	15	2005–2016
7	Alfaz Ahmed	62	12	1995–2008
8	Kaiser Hamid	59	5	1984–1993
9	Mohd Aminul Haque	56	0	1998–2010
9	**Rakib Hossain**	56	7	2020–present

NB The list is inaccurate as caps for long serving players such as Ashish Bhadra, Satyajit Das Rupu, Badal Roy & Khurshid Alam Babul, along with many others - are still unknown by the Bangladesh Football Federation and is still being researched.

=== Top goalscorers ===
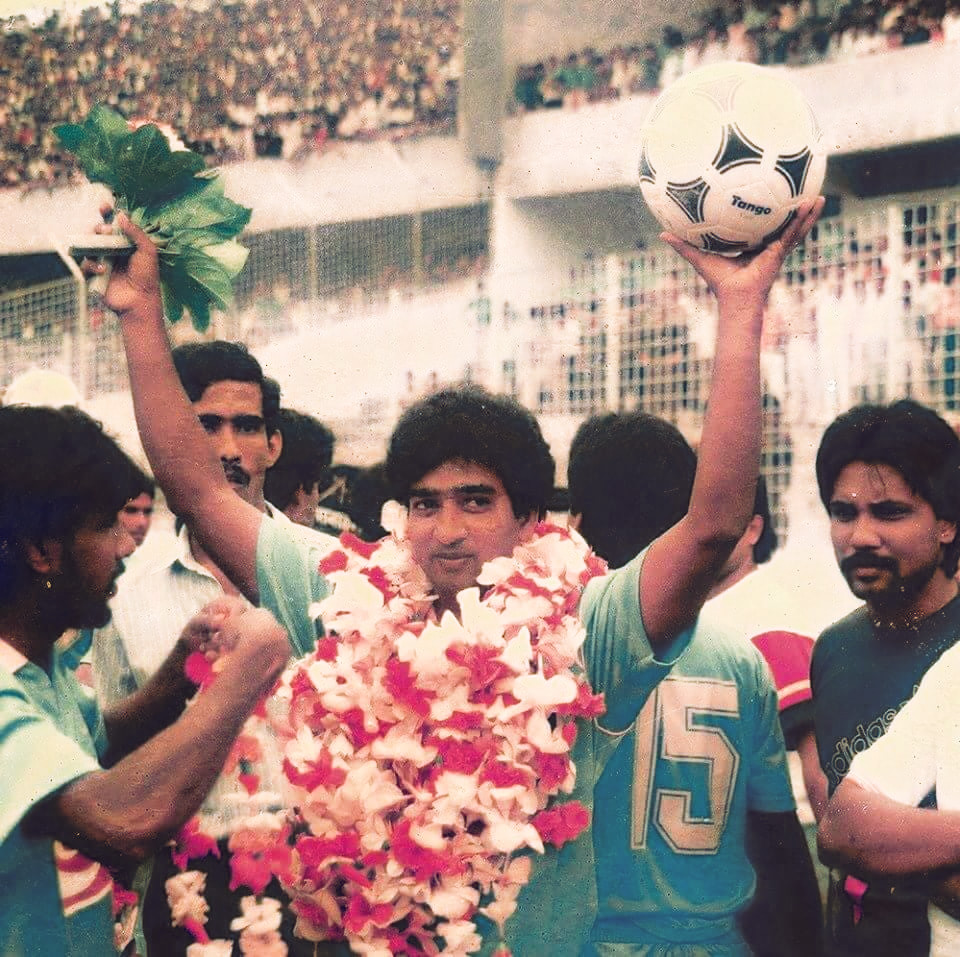
Ashraf Uddin Ahmed Chunnu is Bangladesh's top goalscorer with 17 goals.

Rank	Player	Goals	Caps	Ratio	Career
1	Ashraf Uddin Ahmed Chunnu	17	41	0.41	1975–1985
2	Zahid Hasan Ameli	15	64	0.23	2005–2016
3	Sheikh Mohammad Aslam	14	51	0.27	1978–1993
4	Alfaz Ahmed	12	62	0.19	1995–2008
5	Kazi Salahuddin	9	29	0.32	1973–1983
6	Shakhawat Hossain Rony	8	20	0.4	2011–2018
6	Khandoker Wasim Iqbal	8	47	0.17	1982–1989
6	**Topu Barman**	8	70	0.11	2014–present
9	Enamul Haque	7	16	0.44	2009–2016
9	Mamun Joarder	7	33	0.21	1990–1997
9	**Shekh Morsalin**	7	26	0.27	2023–present
9	**Rakib Hossain**	7	56	0.13	2020–present

=== Most clean sheets ===
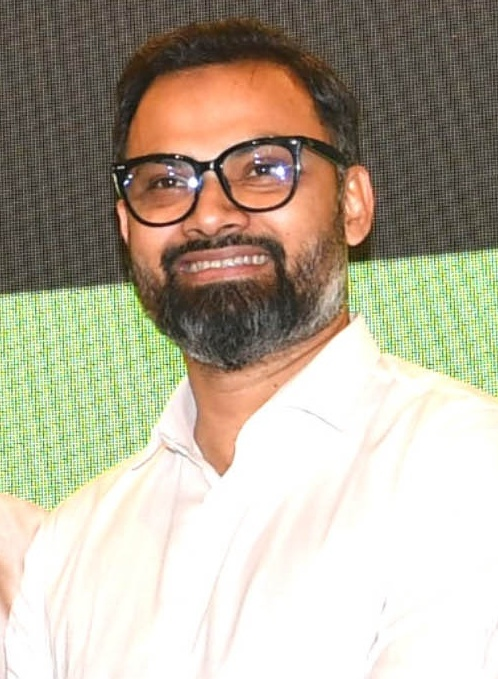
Aminul Haque holds the record for the most clean sheets for Bangladesh, with 18.

Rank	Player	Clean Sheets	Caps	Ratio	Career
1	Aminul Haque	18	56	0.32	1998–2010
2	Shahidul Alam Sohel	10	26	0.38	2011–2023
2	Ashraful Islam Rana	10	25	0.4	2015–2022
4	Sayeed Hassan Kanan	8	23	0.35	1985–1993
4	**Anisur Rahman Zico**	8	30	0.27	2020–present
6	Biplob Bhattacharjee	7	29	0.24	1997–2011
7	Mohamed Mohsin	6	38	0.16	1982–1994
8	Mohammed Ponir	5	13	0.38	1991–1999
9	**Mitul Marma**	4	21	0.19	2023–present
10	Mamun Khan	2	10	0.2	2011–2013

NB The list is inaccurate as total caps for Sayeed Hassan Kanan and Mohamed Mohsin - are still unknown by the Bangladesh Football Federation and is still being researched.

== Competitive record ==
Overview
Event	1st Place	2nd Place	3rd Place
AFC Asian Cup	0	0	0
SAFF Championship	1	2	1
South Asian Games	1	4	1
Total	2	6	2

=== FIFA World Cup ===
FIFA World Cup record									Qualification record					
Year	Result	Position	Pld	W	D	L	GF	GA	Pld	W	D	L	GF	GA
1930 to 1938	Part of (British Raj) British India								Part of (British Raj) British India					
1950 to 1970	Part of Pakistan								Part of Pakistan					
(West Germany) 1974	Not a FIFA member								Not a FIFA member					
1978 and 1982	Did not enter								Did not enter					
(Mexico) 1986	Did not qualify								6	2	0	4	5	10
(Italy) 1990	Did not qualify								6	1	0	5	4	9
(United States) 1994	Did not qualify								8	2	0	6	7	28
(France) 1998	Did not qualify								6	1	0	5	4	14
(South Korea) (Japan) 2002	Did not qualify								6	1	2	3	5	15
(Germany) 2006	Did not qualify								2	0	0	2	0	4
(South Africa) 2010	Did not qualify								2	0	1	1	1	6
(Brazil) 2014	Did not qualify								4	2	1	1	5	4
(Russia) 2018	Did not qualify								8	0	1	7	2	32
(Qatar) 2022	Did not qualify								10	1	3	6	4	19
(Canada) (Mexico) (United States) 2026	Did not qualify								8	1	2	5	4	22
(Morocco) (Portugal) (Spain) 2030	To be determined								To be determined					
(Saudi Arabia) 2034	To be determined								To be determined					
Total	—	0/13	—	—	—	—	—	—	66	11	10	45	41	163

=== FIFA ASEAN Cup ===
FIFA ASEAN Cup record
Year	Result	Position	Pld	W	D	L	GF	GA
(Indonesia) 2026	Group stage	8th	3	0	0	3	2	13
Total	Group stage	8th	3	0	0	3	2	13

FIFA ASEAN Cup History
Year	Round	Opponent	Score	Result	Venue
2026	Group stage	Malaysia	0–3	Loss	Gelora Bung Karno Stadium, Indonesia
2026	Group stage	Singapore	0–1	Loss	Gelora Bung Karno Stadium, Indonesia
2026	Group stage	Indonesia	2–9	Loss	Gelora Bung Karno Stadium, Indonesia

=== AFC Asian Cup ===
AFC Asian Cup record										Qualification record					
Year	Result	Position	Pld	W	D	L	GF	GA	Squad	Pld	W	D	L	GF	GA
(Hong Kong) 1956 to (Iran) 1968	Part of Pakistan									Part of Pakistan					
(Thailand) 1972	Not an AFC member									Not an AFC member					
(Iran) 1976	Withdrew									Withdrew					
(Kuwait) 1980	Group Stage	10th	4	0	0	4	2	17	Squad	4	1	2	1	7	8
(Singapore) 1984	Did not qualify									5	1	0	4	6	13
(Qatar) 1988	Did not qualify									5	0	3	2	1	9
(Japan) 1992	Did not qualify									2	0	0	2	0	7
(United Arab Emirates) 1996	Withdrew									Withdrew					
(Lebanon) 2000	Did not qualify									4	1	1	2	5	12
(China) 2004	Did not qualify									2	0	1	1	3	4
(Indonesia) (Malaysia) (Thailand) (Vietnam) 2007	Did not qualify									8	1	1	6	2	19
(Qatar) 2011	Did not qualify									AFC Challenge Cup					
(Australia) 2015	Did not qualify									AFC Challenge Cup					
(United Arab Emirates) 2019	Did not qualify									12	0	2	10	3	41
(Qatar) 2023	Did not qualify									13	1	3	9	6	27
(Saudi Arabia) 2027	Did not qualify									8	1	2	5	4	22
Total	Group stage	1/19	4	0	0	4	2	17	—	55	5	13	37	33	140

AFC Asian Cup History
Year	Round	Opponent	Score	Result	Venue
1980	Group stage	North Korea	2–3	Loss	Sabah Al Salem Stadium, Kuwait
1980	Group stage	Syria	0–1	Loss	Sabah Al Salem Stadium, Kuwait
1980	Group stage	Iran	0–7	Loss	Sabah Al Salem Stadium, Kuwait
1980	Group stage	China	0–6	Loss	Sabah Al Salem Stadium, Kuwait

=== SAFF Championship ===
SAFF Championship record
Year	Result	Position	Pld	W	D	L	GF	GA	Squad
(Pakistan) 1993	Did not enter								
(Sri Lanka) 1995	Semi-finals	3rd	3	1	1	1	2	1	Squad
(Nepal) 1997	Group stage	5th	2	0	1	1	1	4	N/A
(India) 1999	Runners-up	2nd	4	2	1	1	6	3	Squad
(Bangladesh) 2003	Champions	1st	5	4	1	0	8	2	Squad
(Pakistan) 2005	Runners-up	2nd	5	3	1	1	7	3	Squad
(Maldives) (Sri Lanka) 2008	Group stage	6th	3	0	2	1	3	4	Squad
(Bangladesh) 2009	Semi-finals	3rd	4	2	1	1	6	3	Squad
(India) 2011	Group stage	7th	3	0	1	2	1	4	Squad
(Nepal) 2013	Group stage	7th	3	0	1	2	2	5	Squad
(India) 2015	Group stage	5th	3	1	0	2	4	7	Squad
(Bangladesh) 2018	Group stage	5th	3	2	0	1	3	2	Squad
(Maldives) 2021	Group stage	4th	4	1	2	1	3	4	Squad
(India) 2023	Semi-finals	3rd	4	2	0	2	6	5	Squad
(Bangladesh) 2026	Semi-finals	3rd	3	2	0	1	5	1	Squad
Total	1 Title	14/15	49	20	14	17	57	48	—

SAFF Championship history
Year	Round	Opponent	Score	Result	Venue
1995	Group stage	Pakistan	0–1	Loss	Sugathadasa Stadium, Sri Lanka
1995	Group stage	Nepal	2–0	Win	Sugathadasa Stadium, Sri Lanka
1995	Semi-finals	India	0–0 (2–4 p)	Draw	Sugathadasa Stadium, Sri Lanka
1997	Group stage	Maldives	1–1	Draw	Dasharath Rangasala, Nepal
1997	Group stage	India	0–3	Loss	Dasharath Rangasala, Nepal
1999	Group stage	India	0–0	Draw	Fatorda Stadium, India
1999	Group stage	Pakistan	3–0	Win	Fatorda Stadium, India
1999	Semi-finals	Nepal	2–1	Win	Fatorda Stadium, India
1999	Final	India	0–2	Loss	Fatorda Stadium, India
2003	Group stage	Nepal	1–0	Win	Bangabandhu National Stadium, Bangladesh
2003	Group stage	Maldives	1–0	Win	Bangabandhu National Stadium, Bangladesh
2003	Group stage	Bhutan	3–0	Win	Bangabandhu National Stadium, Bangladesh
2003	Semi-finals	India	2–1 (a.e.t.)	Win	Bangabandhu National Stadium, Bangladesh
2003	Final	Maldives	1–1 (5–3 p)	Draw	Bangabandhu National Stadium, Bangladesh
2005	Group stage	Bhutan	3–0	Win	Jinnah Sports Stadium, Pakistan
2005	Group stage	Nepal	2–0	Win	Jinnah Sports Stadium, Pakistan
2005	Group stage	India	1–1	Draw	Jinnah Sports Stadium, Pakistan
2005	Semi-finals	Pakistan	1–0	Win	Jinnah Sports Stadium, Pakistan
2005	Final	India	0–2	Loss	Jinnah Sports Stadium, Pakistan
2008	Group stage	Bhutan	1–1	Draw	Sugathadasa Stadium, Sri Lanka
2008	Group stage	Afghanistan	2–2	Draw	Sugathadasa Stadium, Sri Lanka
2008	Group stage	Sri Lanka	0–1	Loss	Sugathadasa Stadium, Sri Lanka
2009	Group stage	Bhutan	4–1	Win	Bangabandhu National Stadium, Bangladesh
2009	Group stage	Pakistan	0–0	Draw	Bangabandhu National Stadium, Bangladesh
2009	Group stage	Sri Lanka	2–1	Win	Bangabandhu National Stadium, Bangladesh
2009	Semi-finals	India U23	0–2	Loss	Bangabandhu National Stadium, Bangladesh
2011	Group stage	Pakistan	0–0	Draw	Jawaharlal Nehru Stadium, India
2011	Group stage	Nepal	0–1	Loss	Jawaharlal Nehru Stadium, India
2011	Group stage	Maldives	1–3	Loss	Jawaharlal Nehru Stadium, India
2013	Group stage	Nepal	0–2	Loss	Dasharath Rangasala, Nepal
2013	Group stage	India	1–1	Draw	Dasharath Rangasala, Nepal
2013	Group stage	Pakistan	1–2	Loss	Dasharath Rangasala, Nepal
2015	Group stage	Afghanistan	0–4	Loss	Trivandrum International Stadium, India
2015	Group stage	Maldives	1–3	Loss	Trivandrum International Stadium, India
2015	Group stage	Bhutan	3–0	Win	Trivandrum International Stadium, India
2018	Group stage	Bhutan	2–0	Win	Bangabandhu National Stadium, Bangladesh
2018	Group stage	Pakistan	1–0	Win	Bangabandhu National Stadium, Bangladesh
2018	Group stage	Nepal	0–2	Loss	Bangabandhu National Stadium, Bangladesh
2021	Group stage	Sri Lanka	1–0	Win	National Football Stadium, Maldives
2021	Group stage	India	1–1	Draw	National Football Stadium, Maldives
2021	Group stage	Maldives	0–2	Loss	National Football Stadium, Maldives
2021	Group stage	Nepal	1–1	Draw	National Football Stadium, Maldives
2023	Group stage	Lebanon	2–0	Loss	Sree Kanteerava Stadium, India
2023	Group stage	Maldives	3–1	Win	Sree Kanteerava Stadium, India
2023	Group stage	Bhutan	3–1	Win	Sree Kanteerava Stadium, India
2023	Semi-finals	Kuwait	0–1	Loss	Sree Kanteerava Stadium, India
2026	Group stage	Bhutan	1–0	Win	National Stadium, Bangladesh
2026	Group stage	Sri Lanka	4–0	Win	National Stadium, Bangladesh
2026	Semi-finals	Pakistan	0–1	Loss	National Stadium, Bangladesh

=== South Asian Games ===
South Asian Games record
Year	Result	Position	Pld	W	D	L	GF	GA	Squad
(Nepal) 1984	Runners-up	2nd	4	3	0	1	14	4	N/A
(Bangladesh) 1985	Runners-up	2nd	3	2	0	1	11	2	N/A
(India) 1987	Fourth place	4th	2	1	0	2	3	2	N/A
(Pakistan) 1989	Runners-up	2nd	3	1	1	1	4	2	N/A
(Sri Lanka) 1991	Third place	3rd	3	2	1	0	4	2	N/A
(Bangladesh) 1993	Group stage	6th	2	0	1	1	0	1	N/A
(India) 1995	Runners-up	2nd	4	2	1	1	2	1	N/A
(Nepal) 1999	Champions	1st	4	3	0	1	4	1	N/A
(Pakistan) 2004 to present	See Bangladesh national U-23 team								
Total	1 Title	8/8	25	14	4	8	42	15	—

South Asian Games history
Year	Round	Opponent	Score	Result	Venue
1984	Group stage	Bhutan	2–0	Win	Dasharath Rangasala, Nepal
1984	Group stage	Maldives	5–0	Win	Dasharath Rangasala, Nepal
1984	Group stage	Nepal	5–0	Win	Dasharath Rangasala, Nepal
1984	Gold medal match	Nepal	2–4	Loss	Dasharath Rangasala, Nepal
1985	Group stage	Pakistan	2–1	Win	Unknown, Bangladesh
1985	Group stage	Maldives	8–0	Win	Unknown, Bangladesh
1985	Gold medal match	India	1–1 (3–4 p)	Draw	Unknown, Bangladesh
1987	Group stage	Nepal	0–1	Loss	Salt Lake Stadium, India
1987	Group stage	Bhutan	3–0	Win	Salt Lake Stadium, India
1987	Bronze medal match	Pakistan	0–1	Loss	Salt Lake Stadium, India
1989	Group stage	Sri Lanka	3–0	Win	Jinnah Sports Stadium, Pakistan
1989	Group stage	India	1–1	Draw	Jinnah Sports Stadium, Pakistan
1989	Gold medal match	Pakistan	0–1	Loss	Jinnah Sports Stadium, Pakistan
1991	Group stage	Pakistan	0–1	Loss	Sugathadasa Stadium, Sri Lanka
1991	Group stage	India	2–1	Win	Sugathadasa Stadium, Sri Lanka
1991	Bronze medal match	Nepal	2–0	Win	Sugathadasa Stadium, Sri Lanka
1993	Group stage	Maldives	0–0	Draw	Bangabandhu National Stadium, Bangladesh
1993	Group stage	Nepal	0–1	Loss	Bangabandhu National Stadium, Bangladesh
1995	Group stage	Maldives	0–0	Draw	Unknown, India
1995	Group stage	Nepal	2–1	Win	Unknown, India
1995	Gold medal match	India	0–1	Loss	Unknown, India
1999	Group stage	Maldives	1–2	Loss	Dasharath Rangasala, Nepal
1999	Group stage	Sri Lanka	1–0	Win	Dasharath Rangasala, Nepal
1999	Group stage	India	1–0	Win	Dasharath Rangasala, Nepal
1999	Gold medal match	Nepal	1–0	Win	Dasharath Rangasala, Nepal

=== AFC Challenge Cup ===
AFC Challenge Cup record									Qualification record					
Year	Position	Pld	W	D	L	GF	GA	Squad	Pld	W	D	L	GF	GA
(Bangladesh) 2006	Quarter-finals	4	2	1	1	7	8	Squad	Qualified as hosts					
(India) 2008	Did not qualify								2	0	1	1	1	2
(Sri Lanka) 2010	Group stage	3	1	0	2	3	6	Squad	3	2	0	1	5	2
(Nepal) 2012	Did not qualify								3	1	0	2	2	5
(Maldives) 2014	Did not qualify								3	2	0	1	6	1
Total	2/5	7	3	1	3	10	14	—	11	5	1	5	14	10

AFC Challenge Cup history
Year	Round	Opponent	Score	Result	Venue
2006	Group stage	Cambodia	2–1	Win	Bangabandhu National Stadium, Bangladesh
2006	Group stage	Guam	3–0	Win	Bangabandhu National Stadium, Bangladesh
2006	Group stage	Palestine	1–1	Draw	Bangabandhu National Stadium, Bangladesh
2006	Quarter-finals	Tajikistan	1–6	Loss	Bangabandhu National Stadium, Bangladesh
2010	Group stage	Tajikistan	2–1	Win	Sugathadasa Stadium, Sri Lanka
2010	Group stage	Myanmar	1–2	Loss	Sugathadasa Stadium, Sri Lanka
2010	Group stage	Sri Lanka	0–3	Loss	Sugathadasa Stadium, Sri Lanka

=== Asian Games ===
Asian Games record
Year	Result	Position	Pld	W	D	L	GF	GA	Squad
(India) 1951 New Delhi	Did not enter; was part of Pakistan until 1971								
(Philippines) 1954 Manila	Did not enter; was part of Pakistan until 1971								
(Japan) 1958 Tokyo	Did not enter; was part of Pakistan until 1971								
(Indonesia) 1962 Jakarta	Did not enter; was part of Pakistan until 1971								
(Thailand) 1966 Bangkok	Did not enter; was part of Pakistan until 1971								
(Thailand) 1970 Bangkok	Did not enter; was part of Pakistan until 1971								
(Iran) 1974 Tehran	Did not participate								
(Thailand) 1978 Bangkok	Group stage	12/14	2	0	0	2	0	4	Squad
(India) 1982 New Delhi	Group stage	11/16	3	1	0	2	2	4	Squad
(South Korea) 1986 Seoul	Group stage	16/18	4	1	0	3	1	12	Squad
(China) 1990 Beijing	Group stage	11/14	2	0	0	2	0	7	Squad
(Japan) 1994 Hiroshima	Did not participate								
(Thailand) 1998 Bangkok	Withdrew								
(South Korea) 2002 to present	See Bangladesh U-23 national team								
Total	4/13	—	11	2	0	9	3	27	—

Asian Games history
Year	Round	Opponent	Score	Result	Venue
1978	Group stage	Malaysia	0–1	Loss	Bangkok, Thailand
1978	Group stage	India	0–3	Loss	Bangkok, Thailand
1982	Group stage	India	0–2	Loss	Jawaharlal Nehru Stadium, India
1982	Group stage	China	0–1	Loss	Jawaharlal Nehru Stadium, India
1982	Group stage	Malaysia	2–1	Win	Jawaharlal Nehru Stadium, India
1986	Group stage	Kuwait	0–4	Loss	Daejeon Stadium, South Korea
1986	Group stage	Iran	0–4	Loss	Daejeon Stadium, South Korea
1986	Group stage	Nepal	1–0	Win	Daejeon Stadium, South Korea
1986	Group stage	Japan	0–4	Loss	Daejeon Stadium, South Korea
1990	Group stage	Saudi Arabia	0–4	Loss	Xiannongtan Stadium, China
1990	Group stage	Japan	0–3	Loss	Xiannongtan Stadium, China

== Head-to-head record ==
As of 14 November 2026.

More wins Wins equal losses More losses

Bangladesh national football team head-to-head records
Opponent	Confederation	Pld	W	D	L	GF	GA	GD	Win%	First	Last
Afghanistan	AFC	10	1	7	2	11	13	−2	10.00	1979	2023
Algeria	CAF	1	0	0	1	0	1	−1	0.00	1983	1983
Australia	AFC	4	0	0	4	0	18	−18	0.00	2015	2024
Bahrain	AFC	2	0	0	2	0	4	−4	0.00	1979	2022
Bhutan	AFC	18	14	2	2	38	9	+29	77.78	1984	2026
Bosnia and Herzegovina	UEFA	1	0	0	1	0	2	−2	0.00	2001	2001
Burundi	CAF	1	0	0	1	0	3	−3	0.00	2020	2020
Cambodia	AFC	6	5	1	0	7	2	+5	83.33	2006	2023
China	AFC	5	0	0	5	0	15	−15	0.00	1980	1989
Chinese Taipei	AFC	2	1	0	1	3	4	−1	50.00	1997	1997
Guam	AFC	1	1	0	0	3	0	+3	100.00	2006	2006
Hong Kong	AFC	6	0	2	4	7	19	−12	0.00	1975	2025
India	AFC	29	4	13	12	21	38	−17	13.79	1978	2025
Indonesia	AFC	8	1	2	5	6	21	−15	12.50	1975	2026
Iran	AFC	7	0	1	6	1	28	−27	0.00	1980	1989
Japan	AFC	5	0	0	5	1	22	−21	0.00	1975	1993
Jordan	AFC	2	0	0	2	0	12	−12	0.00	2015	2016
Kuwait	AFC	3	0	0	3	1	7	−6	0.00	1973	2023
Kyrgyzstan	AFC	4	0	0	4	2	10	−8	0.00	2007	2021
Laos	AFC	5	2	2	1	5	4	+1	40.00	2003	2019
Lebanon	AFC	5	1	1	3	3	11	−8	20.00	2011	2024
Macau	AFC	1	1	0	0	3	0	+3	100.00	2009	2009
Malaysia	AFC	11	1	2	8	4	23	−19	9.09	1975	2026
Maldives	AFC	20	7	6	7	30	27	+3	35.00	1984	2024
Mongolia	AFC	3	1	2	0	5	2	+3	33.33	2001	2022
Myanmar	AFC	12	4	2	6	15	27	−12	33.33	1973	2011
Nepal	AFC	30	14	7	9	36	25	+11	46.67	1982	2025
North Korea	AFC	2	0	0	2	2	4	−2	0.00	1980	1985
Northern Mariana Islands	AFC	1	1	0	0	4	0	+4	100.00	2013	2013
Oman	AFC	3	0	0	3	2	10	−8	0.00	1982	2021
Pakistan	AFC	19	8	4	7	18	11	+7	42.11	1982	2026
Palestine	AFC	8	0	1	7	1	16	−15	0.00	2006	2024
Philippines	AFC	3	1	0	2	3	6	−3	33.33	1984	2018
Qatar	AFC	7	0	2	5	3	18	−15	0.00	1979	2021
San Marino	UEFA	1	1	0	0	2	1	+1	100.00	2026	2026
Saudi Arabia	AFC	5	0	0	5	1	20	−19	0.00	1990	2001
Seychelles	CAF	3	1	1	1	2	2	+0	33.33	2021	2023
Singapore	AFC	7	1	2	4	5	8	−3	14.29	1973	2026
South Korea	AFC	4	0	0	4	0	20	−20	0.00	1975	1992
Sri Lanka	AFC	21	14	2	5	32	14	+18	66.67	1979	2026
Sudan	CAF	1	0	0	1	1	4	−3	0.00	1979	1979
Syria	AFC	3	0	0	3	1	5	−4	0.00	1980	2007
Tajikistan	AFC	10	1	2	7	5	29	−24	10.00	2003	2016
Thailand	AFC	15	2	5	8	13	29	−16	13.33	1973	2012
Turkmenistan	AFC	1	0	0	1	1	2	−1	0.00	2022	2022
United Arab Emirates	AFC	5	0	0	5	1	21	−20	0.00	1988	2016
Uzbekistan	AFC	3	0	0	3	0	15	−15	0.00	2000	2006
Vietnam (Note: Includes a game against South Vietnam which ended 1–1 in 1973.)	AFC	4	0	2	2	1	8	−7	0.00	1973	2026
Yemen (Note: Includes a game against North Yemen which ended 0–0 in 1988.)	AFC	2	1	1	0	1	0	+1	50.00	1988	1994
FR Yugoslavia (Note: Country no longer exists. Football records transferred to Serbia)	UEFA	1	0	0	1	1	4	−3	0.00	2001	2001
Total	50 nations	331	89	73	164	302	591	−289	26.88	1973	2026
Last match updated was against Pakistan on 14 November 2026.

== Honours ==
=== Regional ===
- SAFF Championship
  - (gold) Champions (1): 2003
  - (silver) Runners-up (2): 1999, 2005
  - (bronze) Third place (2): 1995
- South Asian Games
  - (gold) Gold medal (1): 1999
  - (silver) Silver medal (4): 1984, 1985, 1989, 1995
  - (bronze) Bronze medal (1): 1991

=== Friendly ===
- Bangabandhu Gold Cup
  - (silver) Runners-up (1): 2015
- Quaid-e-Azam International Tournament
  - (silver) Runners-up (1): 1985
  - (bronze) Third place (1): 1987
- President's Gold Cup
  - (gold) Champions (1): 1989
- 4-nation Tiger Trophy
  - (gold) Champions (1): 1995
- Jigme Dorji Wangchuk Memorial Trophy
  - (gold) Champions (1): 2003
- Mujib Borsho FIFA International Football Series
  - (gold) Champions (1): 2020
- Three Nations Cup (Nepal)
  - (silver) Runners-up (1): 2021

== See also ==
- Football in Bangladesh
  - Bangladesh Football Federation
  - Bangladesh national football team performances
  - Bangladesh women's national football team
  - List of Bangladesh national football team managers
  - List of football stadiums in Bangladesh
- Youth Teams
  - Bangladesh national under-23 football team
  - Bangladesh national under-20 football team
  - Bangladesh national under-17 football team

== Notes ==
Preceded by 1999 India	South Asian Champions; 2003 Bangladesh (First title)	Succeeded by 2005 India
