= Zidane Yousuf =

Bangladeshi footballer (born 2007)

Personal information
- Full name: Zidane Alexander Yousuf
- Date of birth: 22 September 2007 (age 19)
- Place of birth: London, England
- Height: 1.93 m (6 ft 4 in)
- Positions: Centre-back; defensive midfielder

Youth career
- 2024–2025: Hanworth Villa
- 2025–2026: Walton & Hersham

Senior career*
Years	Team	Apps	(Gls)
2025–2026	Walton & Hersham	2	(0)

International career^{‡}
2026–	Bangladesh U20	3	(0)
2026–	Bangladesh	6	(0)
- * Club domestic league appearances and goals ‡ National team caps and goals as of 14 November 2026

Zidane Alexander Yousuf (born 22 September 2007) is a footballer who plays as a centre-back. Born in England, he plays for the Bangladesh national team.

== Early life ==
Yousuf was born in London, England to a Bangladeshi father and Mexican mother.

== Club career ==
=== Early career ===
Yousuf began playing Sunday league football in the Harrow League before being identified by Chelsea F.C. and joining the club's Talent Identification Centre, where he played against academy sides including Crystal Palace and Fulham. After four years, he joined Tandridge League club FC Battersea in 2022. He spent two years at the club during which he won two league titles, two league cups and the London Cup, and was named the club's player of the year.

Following his three seasons at FC Battersea, Yousuf had a four-week trial with Queens Park Rangers at the end of the 2024–25 under-16 season. He subsequently joined Hanworth Villa's under-18 side, where he spent a season and scored in the FA Youth Cup.

=== Walton & Hersham ===
Yousuf joined Walton & Hersham's under-18 side from the 2025–26 season and was eventually promoted to the first team in October 2025. He made his senior debut on 25 October 2025 in a FA Trophy match against Hendon, coming on as a substitute and scoring in a 5–1 win. During the 2025–26 season, he made five senior appearances for Walton & Hersham, including two league appearances and three cup appearances, scoring once. The club won the Southern Football League Premier Division South title and secured promotion to the National League South.

== International career ==
Yousuf was called up to the Bangladesh U20 team for the 2027 AFC U-20 Asian Cup qualification. On 31 August 2026, Yousuf featured for Bangladesh in their 2–0 defeat to hosts Uzbekistan in Tashkent. Bangladesh subsequently lost 3–0 to Syria on 3 September. Following the defeat, The Daily Star described overseas-based defender Yousuf as one of the few positives from Bangladesh's opening two matches of the qualifying campaign.

In August 2026, Yousuf was invited to train with the Bangladesh national team. Yousuf made his senior international debut for Bangladesh against Malaysia in the FIFA ASEAN Cup on 25 September 2026, coming on as a substitute in the 59th minute.

== Style of play ==
Yousuf is a centre-back noted for his reading of the game, positioning and ability to close spaces.

== Career statistics ==
=== Club ===
As of 14 April 2026

Appearances and goals by club, season and competition
Club	Season	League			Domestic		Continental		Other		Total	
Club	Season	Division	Apps	Goals	Apps	Goals	Apps	Goals	Apps	Goals	Apps	Goals
Walton & Hersham	2025–26	SFLPDS	2	0	5	1	0	0	0	0	7	1
Career total			2	0	5	1	0	0	0	0	7	1

=== International ===
As of 14 November 2026

Appearances and goals by national team and year
National team	Year	Apps	Goals
Bangladesh
Bangladesh	2026	6	0
Total		6	0
