= Zayyan Ahmed =

Bangladeshi footballer (born 2004)

Personal information
- Full name: Zayyan Ahmed
- Date of birth: 29 January 2004 (age 22)
- Place of birth: Leesburg, Virginia, U.S.
- Height: 5 ft 9 in (1.75 m)
- Position: Left-back

Team information
- Current team: Rimal Al-Sahra
- Number: 19

College career
Years	Team	Apps	(Gls)
2022–2023	Virginia Tech Hokies	10	(0)
2024–2025	George Mason Patriots	0	(0)

Senior career*
Years	Team	Apps	(Gls)
2026–	Rimal Al-Sahra	9	(1)

International career^{‡}
2025–	Bangladesh U23	5	(0)
2025–	Bangladesh	13	(0)
- * Club domestic league appearances and goals as of 11 September 2026 ‡ National team caps and goals as of 14 November 2026

Zayyan Ahmed (Bengali: জায়ান আহমেদ; born 29 January 2004) is a professional footballer who plays as a left-back for UAE Second Division League club Rimal Al-Sahra SC. Born in the United States, he represents the Bangladesh national team.

== Early career ==
Born on 29 January 2004 in Leesburg, Virginia, Zayyan attended Heritage High School and played youth soccer for Loudoun SC, where he spent five years. Notably, his father, Sharif Ahmed, was a former footballer who played First Division football in Bangladesh for Eskaton Sabuj Sangha. During his time with Loudoun SC, Zayyan served as team captain, earned selection to the Mid-Atlantic First Team, and won the Jefferson Cup. He also received invitations to train with the Bolton Wanderers youth academy and competed with Team USA in the Capelli Cup in Denmark.

== Club career ==
=== College career ===
In 2022, Ahmed joined the Virginia Tech men's soccer program. He made 10 appearances for Virginia Tech Hokies in his freshman season, debuting against the University of Virginia and recording a career-high 41 minutes in a 4–0 victory over Longwood University. In 2024, he switched to George Mason University, and was selected for the university team, however, did not complete the season.

In 2025, he attended BFF Next Global Star organized by the Bangladesh Football Federation from 28 to 30 June.

=== Rimal Al-Sahra ===
In February 2026, Ahmed joined UAE Third Division League club Rimal Al-Sahra SC. He made his first debut for the club on 10 February 2026 as a 46-minute substitute in a UAE Federation Cup Preliminary Round match against Majd.

== International career ==
=== Youth ===
In August 2025, following successful trials, Zayyan was included in the preliminary squad of the Bangladesh U23 team for the 2026 AFC U-23 Asian Cup qualifiers and the preparation matches leading up to the qualifiers. On 18 August, he made his debut in a friendly match against Bahrain U23, held in Manama, Bahrain. The game ended in a 0–1 defeat.

=== Senior ===
In September 2025, he was included in the Bangladesh national team preliminary squad for two 2027 AFC Asian Cup qualification – third round matches against Hong Kong. On 9 October 2025, Zayyan debuted for the senior national team in a 3–4 defeat to Hong Kong at the National Stadium, Dhaka.

== Career statistics ==
As of 14 February 2026.

Club statistics
Club	Season	League			National Cup		Continental		Total	
Club	Season	Division	Apps	Goals	Apps	Goals	Apps	Goals	Apps	Goals
Rimal Al-Sahra	2026	UAE Third Division League	1	0	1	0	–		2	0
Career total			1	0	1	0	0	0	2	0

=== International ===
As of 14 November 2026.

Bangladesh
Year	Apps	Goals
2025	4	0
2026	9	0
Total	13	0
