= Cuba Mitchell =

Bangladeshi footballer (born 2005)

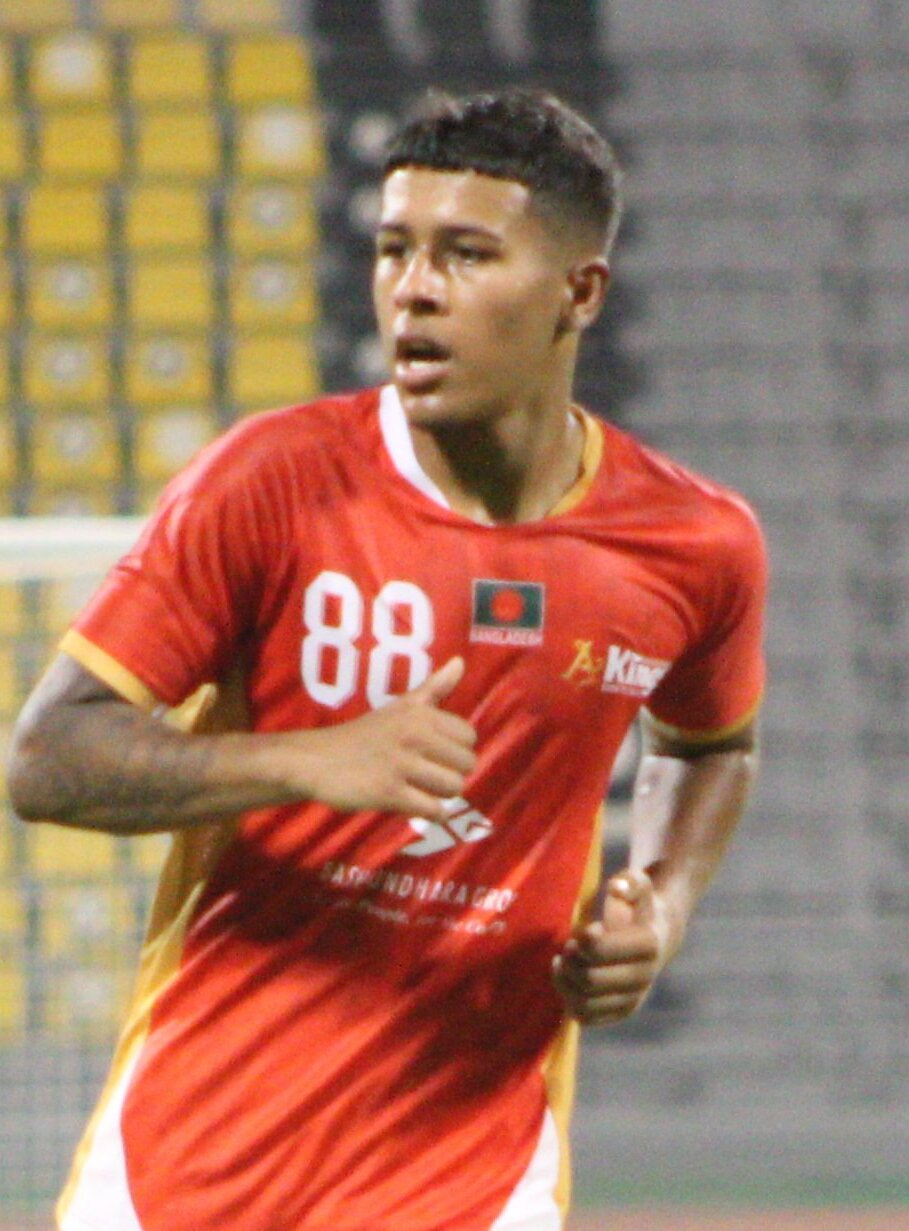
- Cuba as a Bashundhara Kings player in 2025

Personal information
- Full name: Cuba Raul Mitchell
- Date of birth: 23 November 2005 (age 20)
- Place of birth: Birmingham, England
- Height: 1.80 m (5 ft 11 in)
- Position: Midfielder

Team information
- Current team: Barwell

Youth career
- –2022: Birmingham City
- 2022–2025: Sunderland

Senior career*
Years	Team	Apps	(Gls)
2024–2025	Sunderland	0	(0)
2025–2026	Bashundhara Kings	6	(0)
2026	Gloucester City	5	(0)
2026	Stratford Town	4	(1)
2026–	Barwell	12	(3)

International career^{‡}
2025–2026	Bangladesh U23	2	(0)
2025–	Bangladesh	1	(0)
- * Club domestic league appearances and goals as of 8 September 2026 ‡ National team caps and goals as of 13 November 2025

Cuba Raul Mitchell (Bengali: কিউবা রাউল মিচেল; [kiuba raul mitʃel]; born 23 November 2005) is a footballer who plays as a midfielder for Northern Premier League Division One Midlands club Barwell. Born in England, he represents the Bangladesh national team.

== Early life ==
Cuba was born on 23 November 2005, in Birmingham, England. He comes from a diverse background, with Jamaican ancestry on his father's side through his grandfather, whose parents emigrated from Jamaican, and Bangladeshi-Sylheti heritage from his mother.

== Club career ==
=== Early career ===
Having begun his career with Birmingham City, Cuba joined Sunderland on an initial two-year scholarship deal in 2022. While still a regular for Sunderland's Under-18s during the 2022–23 season, Cuba made his debut for the Under-21s. After recovering from injury in 2023, he went on to make 16 appearances for the Under-21 side in the 2023–24 season. On 4 July 2024, he signed his first professional contract with the club. In June 2025, he was named in the released players list by Sunderland.

=== Bashundhara Kings ===
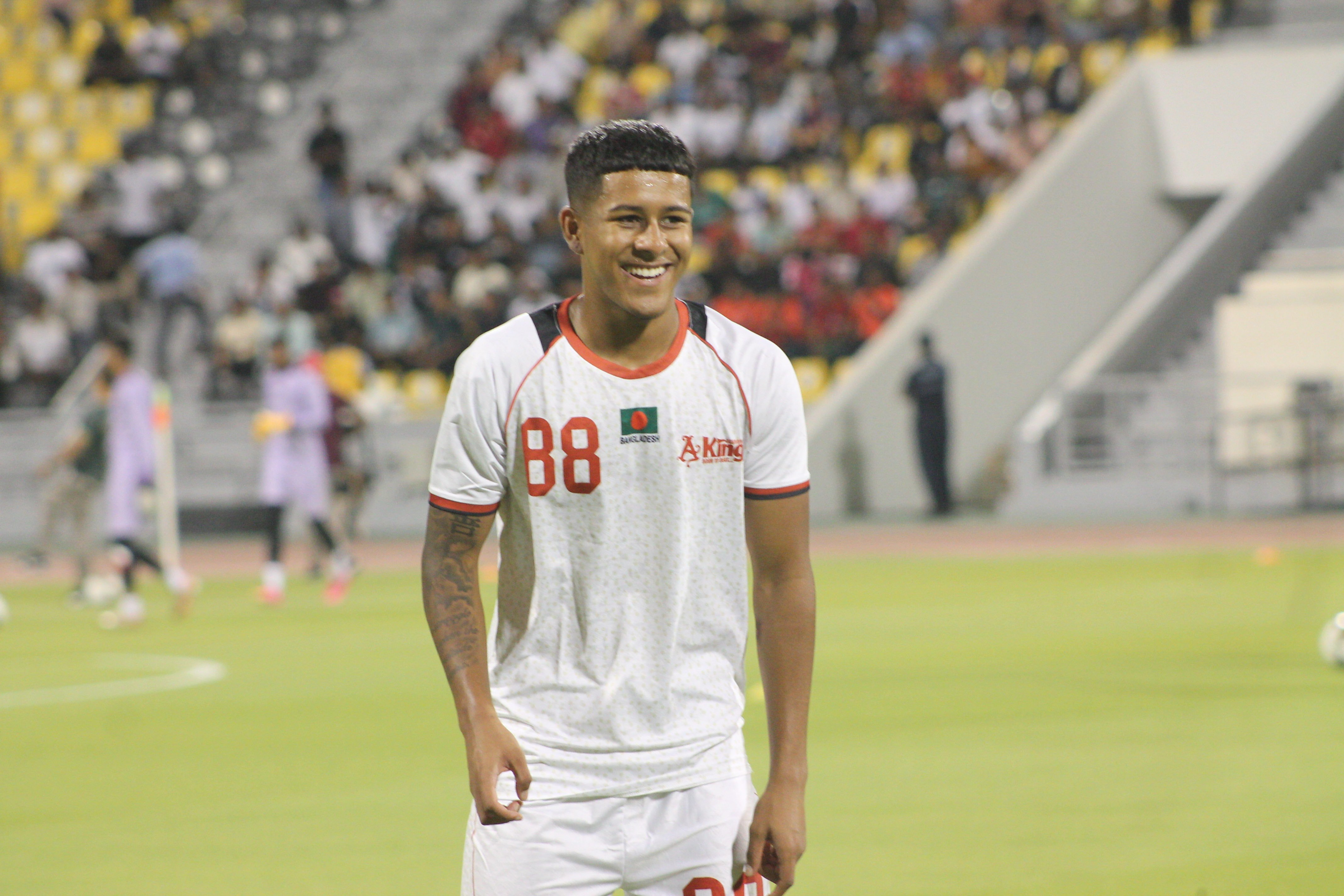
Mitchell playing for Bashundhara Kings in 2025

On 28 July 2025, Cuba joined Bangladesh Football League club Bashundhara Kings on a three-year deal. On 12 August 2025, he made his professional debut by coming on as a second-half substitute in a 1–0 victory over Syrian side Al-Karamah in the 2025–26 AFC Challenge League preliminary stage.

On 3 January 2026, Cuba has announced that he had terminated his contract with the club due to outstanding salary payments.

=== Gloucester City ===
In February 2026, Mitchell signed for Southern League Premier Division South club Gloucester City on a contract until the end of the 2025–26 season. On 28 February 2026, he made his debut starting against Poole Town in a 2–1 victory.

=== Stratford Town ===
In June 2026, he signed for Southern League Premier Division Central club Stratford Town.

== International career ==
He can represent England, his country of birth, as well as the Bangladesh or Jamaica, through his parents.

On 19 April 2025, the Bangladesh Football Federation (BFF) contacted him with an offer to play for the Bangladesh national team, with reports indicating that significant progress had been made in negotiations between the BFF and Cuba. A day earlier, senior football journalist Pete O'Rourke reported that Cuba had already pledged his allegiance to Bangladesh, following a social media post shared by his agents, Dominance Sports Group. Cuba received his Bangladeshi passport on 1 June, and on 3 June received FIFA approval to switch allegiance to Bangladesh.

Cuba was initially called up to the Bangladesh U23 for a training camp held in Bahrain in August 2025. However, he was unable to get clearance from Bashundhara Kings to attend the camp. He eventually represented the team at the 2026 AFC U-23 Asian Cup qualifiers held in Việt Trì, Vietnam, making appearances against the hosts, Vietnam U23, and Singapore U23, as Bangladesh failed to qualify for the main tournament.

On 9 November 2025, due to injuries to veterans Rahmat Mia and Mohammad Ibrahim, head coach, Javier Cabrera, called up Cuba as a late inclusion to the Bangladesh national team squad ahead of a friendly match against Nepal and a 2027 AFC Asian Cup qualification – third round match against India. On 13 November, Cuba made his senior international debut by coming on as an 80th-minute substitute for Hamza Choudhury in a 2–2 draw against Nepal.

== Career statistics ==
=== Club ===
As of 30 October 2025

Appearances and goals by club, season and competition
Club	Season	League			Domestic		Continental		Other		Total	
Club	Season	Division	Apps	Goals	Apps	Goals	Apps	Goals	Apps	Goals	Apps	Goals
Sunderland U21	2022–23	—			—		—		—		0	0
Sunderland U21	2023–24	—			—		—		—		0	0
Sunderland U21	2024–25	—			—		—		—		0	0
Sunderland U21	Total		—		—		—		—		0	0
Bashundhara Kings	2025–26	BFL	6	0	0	0	2 (Note: Appearance(s) in AFC Challenge League)	0	0	0	8	0
Career total			6	0	0	0	2	0	0	0	8	0

=== International ===
As of 13 November 2025

Appearances and goals by national team and year
National team	Year	Apps	Goals
Bangladesh	2025	1	0
Total		1	0
