= List of highest points in the Netherlands =

This list of the highest points in the Kingdom of the Netherlands includes the highest mountain in each of the kingdom's constituent countries, as well as the highest point in each province and municipality. The Netherlands is a flat country: mountains are primarily located in the south of the province of Limburg and on the Caribbean islands. Only natural points are included here.

== Highest points in the European Netherlands (over 150 m) ==
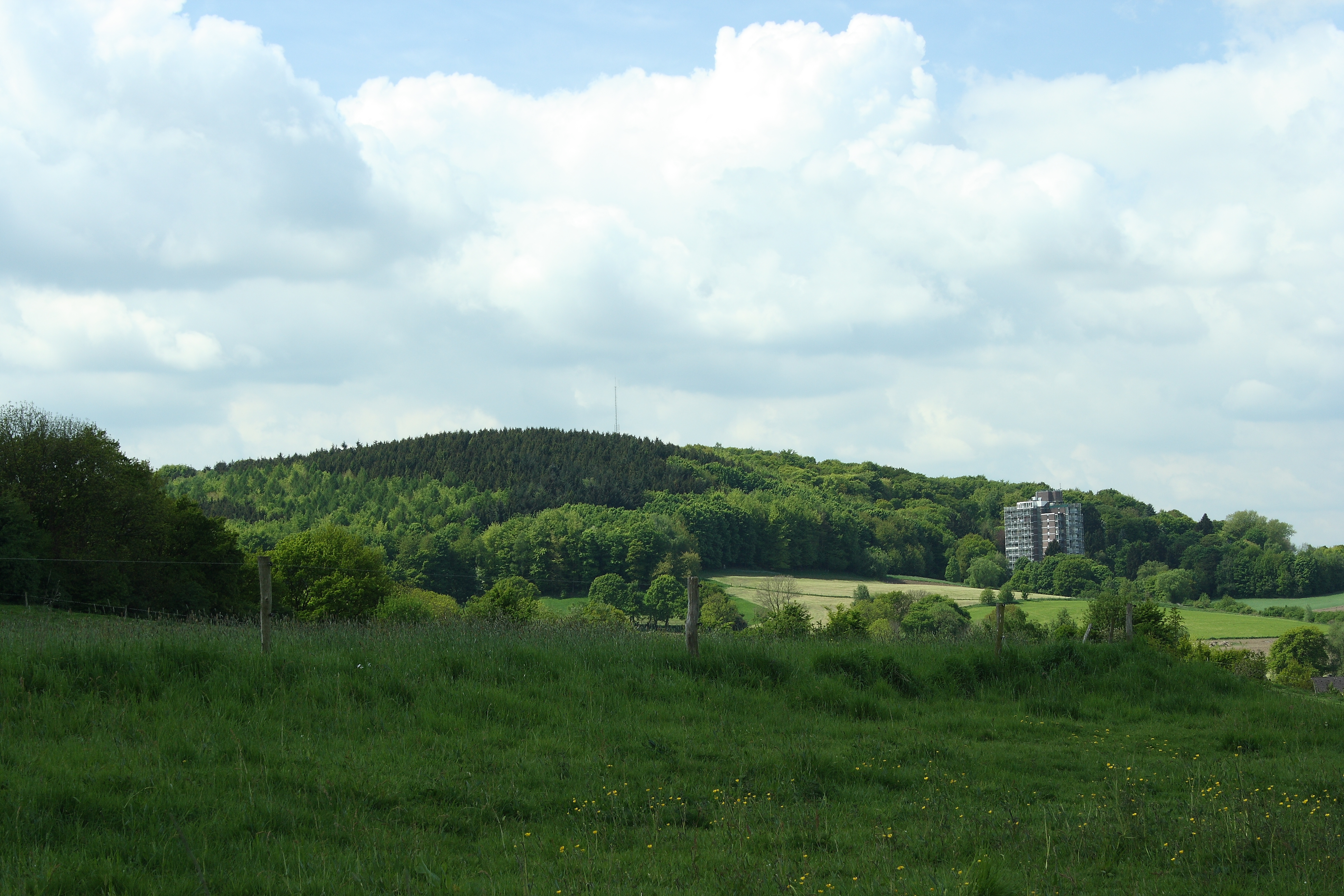
Vaalserberg is the highest point in the European Netherlands and is at a tri-point bordering Belgium and Germany

Summit	Elevation (m)	Municipality, Province
Vaalserberg	322,4	Vaals, Limburg
Eschberg	309,0	Vaals, Limburg
Vijlnerbos	301,0	Vaals, Limburg
Camerig	260,0	Gulpen-Wittem, Limburg
Hakkenberg	252,0	Gulpen-Wittem, Limburg
Hulsberg	231,0	Simpelveld, Limburg
Eperheide	228,0	Gulpen-Wittem, Limburg
Loorberg	219,1	Gulpen-Wittem, Limburg
Vrouwenheide	218,0	Voerendaal, Limburg
Wolfsberg	189,3	Eijsden-Margraten, Limburg
Keutenberg	162,8	Valkenburg aan de Geul, Limburg
Gulperberg	156,8	Gulpen-Wittem, Limburg

=== Highest points that are not in South Limburg (over 75 m) ===
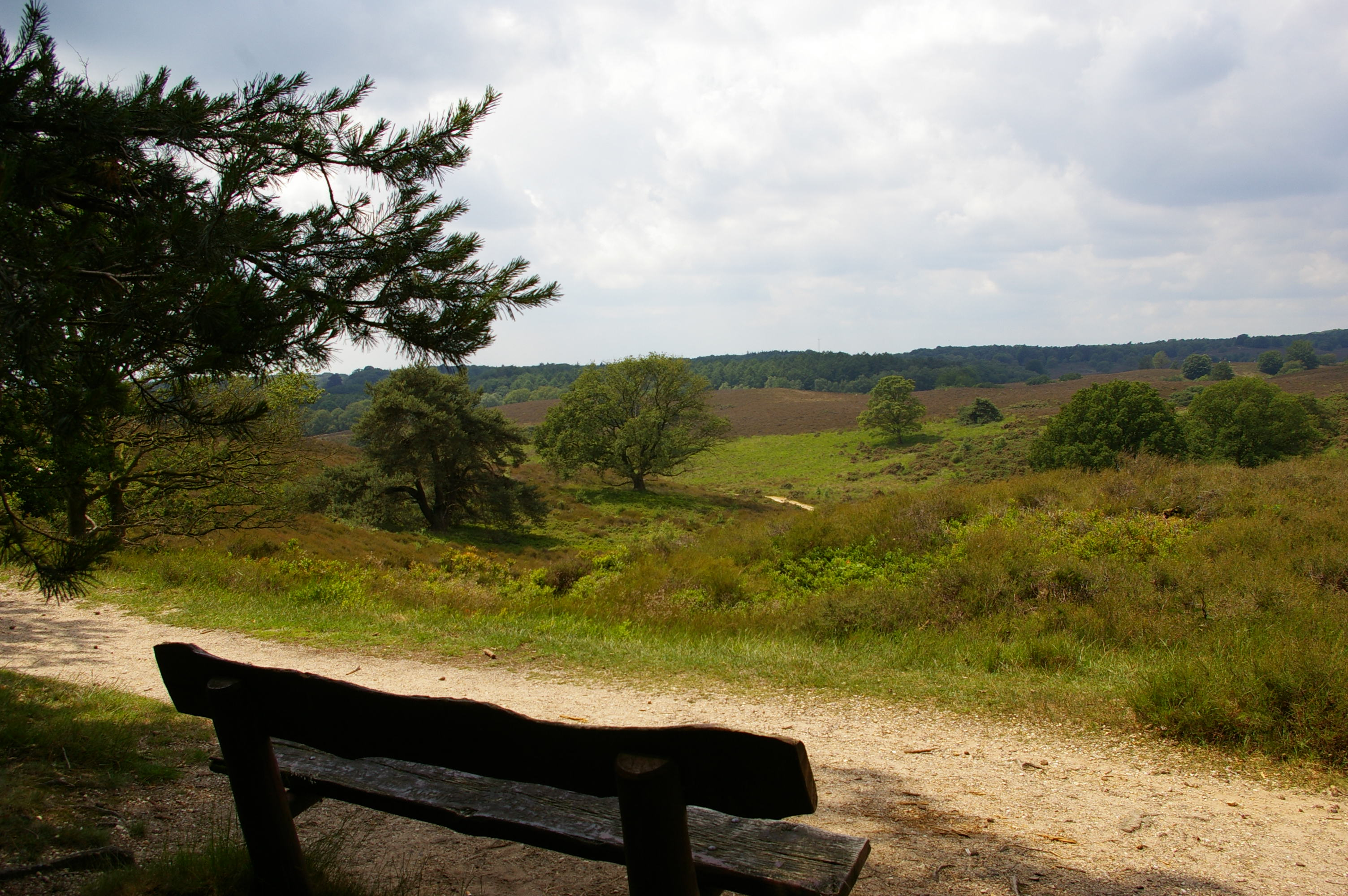
A hill in the Veluwezoom National Park in Gelderland

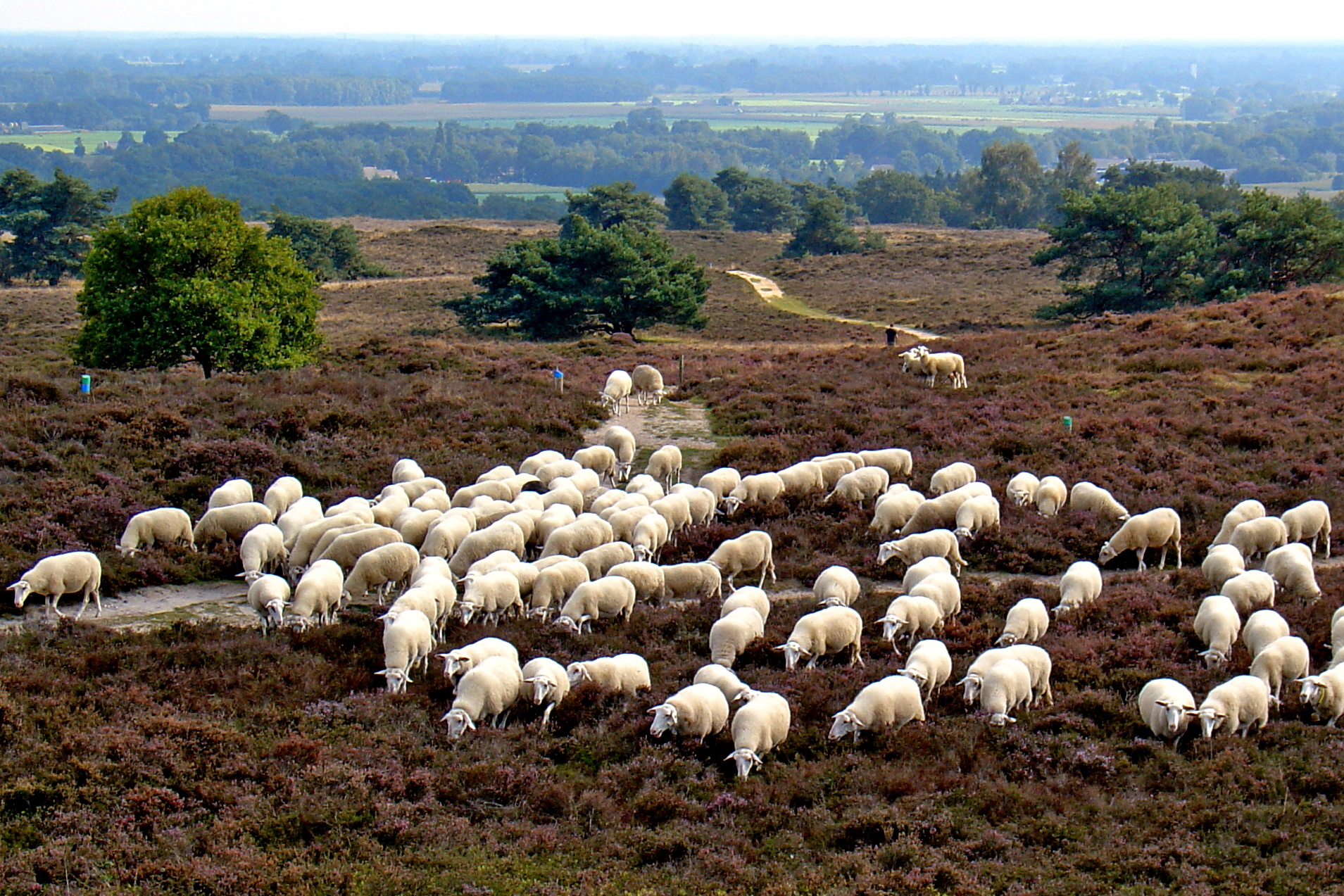
Archemerberg in Ommen in Overijssel

Summit	Elevation (m)	Municipality, Province
Signaal Imbosch	109,9	Rheden, Gelderland
Torenberg	107,1	Apeldoorn, Gelderland
Zijpenberg	102,5	Rheden, Gelderland
Tafelberg	103,9	Rheden, Gelderland
Galgenberg	102.5	Arnhem/Rozendaal, Gelderland
Aardmansberg	101,0	Apeldoorn, Gelderland
Onzalige bossen	100,4	Rheden, Gelderland
Hettenheuvel	93,0	Montferland, Gelderland
Vlierenberg	91,8	Berg en Dal, Gelderland
Tankenberg	85,1	Losser, Overijssel
Hulzenberg	84,6	Montferland, Gelderland
Klifsberg	82,5	Roerdalen, Limburg
Archemerberg	79,9	Ommen, Overijssel
Paasberg	79,8	Losser, Overijssel
Broodberg	77,8	Nunspeet, Gelderland
Hoogte 80	77,5	Arnhem, Gelderland
Kiekberg	77,0	Mook en Middelaar, Limburg
Lemelerberg	77,9	Ommen, Overijssel
Braamberg	76,2	Tubbergen, Overijssel
Tutenberg	76,1	Tubbergen, Overijssel
Duivelsberg	75,9	Berg en Dal, Gelderland
Koningsbelt	75,5	Rijssen, Overijssel

== Highest point per province ==
These are the highest natural points in each of the 12 provinces in the European Netherlands.

Summit	Elevation (m)	Province	Municipality	Notes
Vaalserberg	322	Limburg	Vaals	On the tri-border point
Signaal Imbosch (Rozendaalse Veld)	110	Gelderland	Rheden	Push moraine
Tankenberg	85	Overijssel	Losser	Push moraine
Amerongse Berg	69	Utrecht	Utrechtse Heuvelrug	
Schoorlse Nok	57	Noord-Holland	Bergen	Near coast
Grote Valkenisse	49	Zeeland	Veere	Near coast
Venakkerbos	44	Noord-Brabant	Bergeijk	
Vlaggeduin	37	Zuid-Holland	Katwijk	Dune near coast
Vuurboetsduin	36	Friesland	Vlieland	Dune on an island
Haantjeduin	31	Drenthe	Emmen	
Hasseberg	14	Groningen	Vlagtwedde	On the Dutch-German border
Urk	8	Flevoland	Urk	On a former island

== Highest points in each country ==
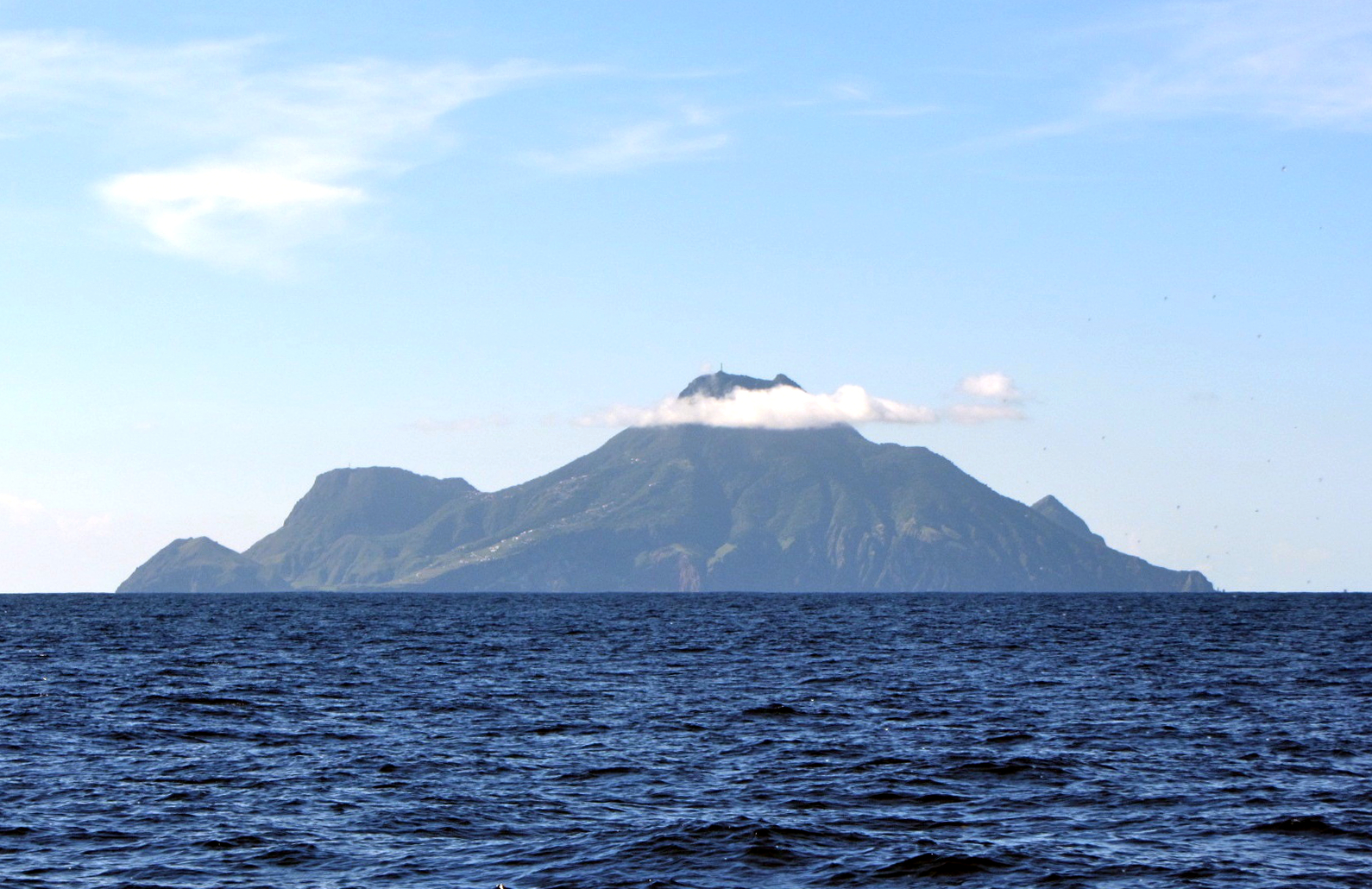
Mount Scenery is a volcano on the island of Saba and is the highest point in the Netherlands (and the Kingdom overall)

Summit	Elevation (m)	Country
Mount Scenery	870	Netherlands
Christoffelberg	375	Curaçao
Sentry Hill	341	Sint Maarten
Jamanota	188	Aruba
