= South Limburg (Netherlands) =

Region in Limburg, the Netherlands

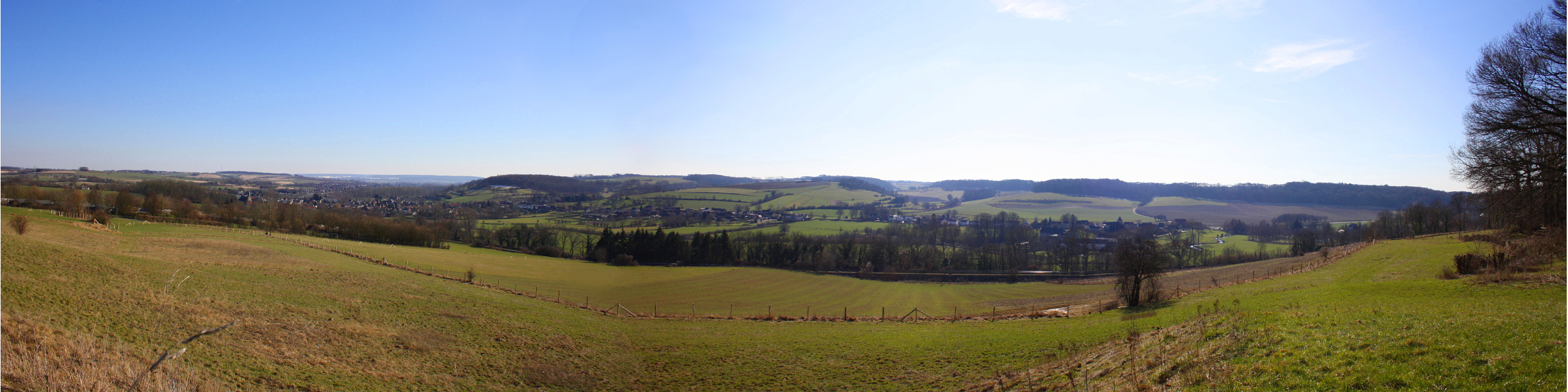
Hills in South Limburg

South Limburg (Dutch: Zuid-Limburg, Limburgish: Zuud-Limburg) is both a COROP (statistical) region as well as a landstreek (area) of the Netherlands located in the province of Limburg. The Dutch term landstreek, literally translated "land area/region", means that the area is not an administrative region but an area that displays cohesion with regard to culture and landscape. With regard to South Limburg this deals with its hilly landscape, especially in the Heuvelland region, sunken lanes, an abundance of castles, and the regional language Limburgish spoken by a significant part of the population alongside Dutch. The region also contains the highest point above sea level in mainland Netherlands, the Vaalserberg being 322.5 metres (1,058 ft) above sea level (the highest point of the entire country is in the Caribbean Netherlands' island of Saba, namely Mount Scenery being 870 metres (2,854 ft) above sea level).

The region South Limburg in addition, although extended a little further north to Roermond, forms a constituent part of the Euroregion Meuse-Rhine.

== Estate region Maastricht-Meerssen ==
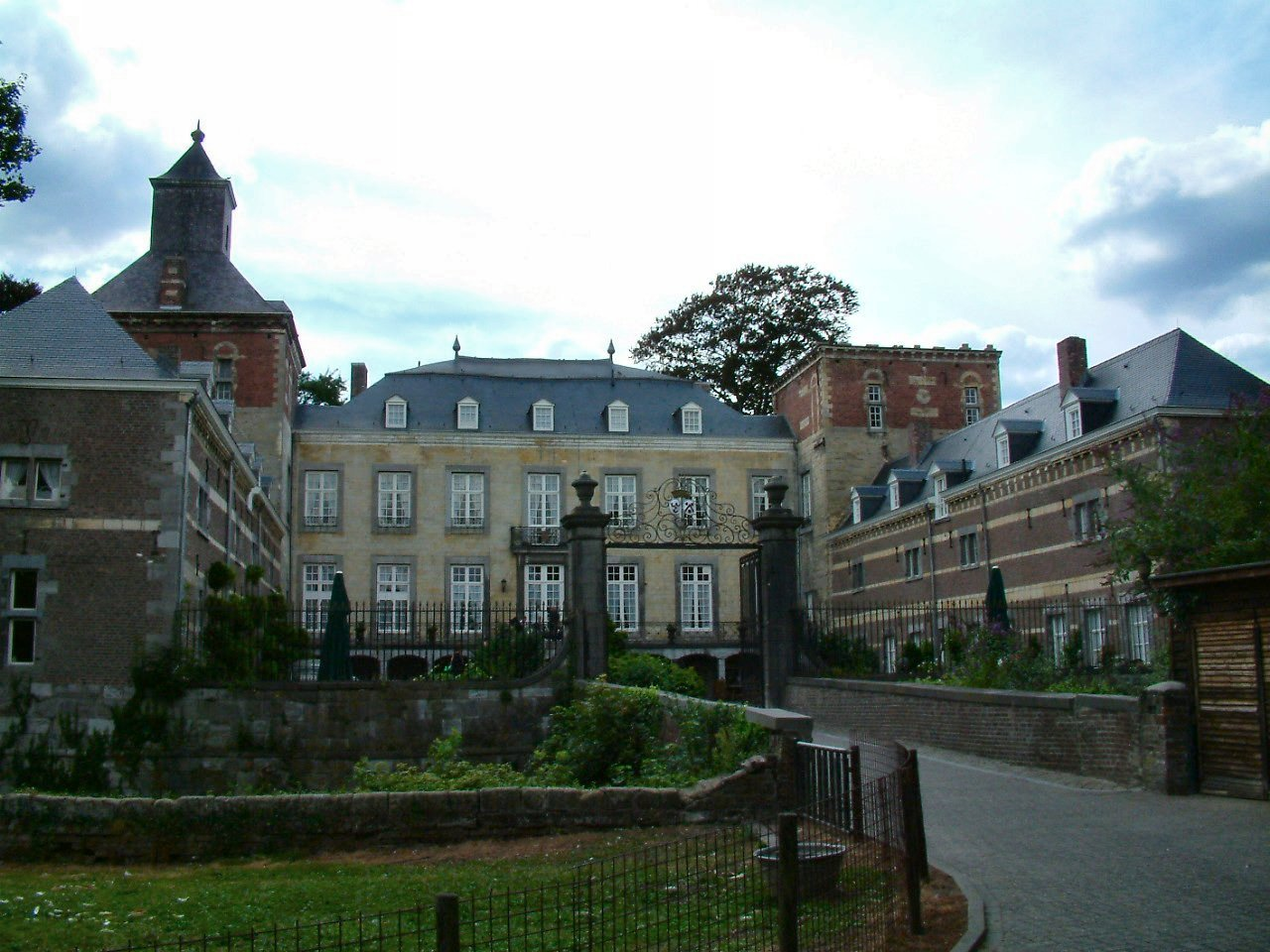
Borgharen Castle in the town of Borgharen in the estate region.

Buitengoed Geul & Maas formerly named estate region Maastricht-Meerssen (Dutch: Landgoederenzone Maastricht - Meerssen) is the name for an area stretching from the northeastern parts of Maastricht to the south of Meerssen that is characterised by a large number of estates. The area is crossed by three rivers (namely the Meuse, Geul and Kanjel). A majority of said estates have been built (or renovated) by the 19th century Maastrichtian industrialist Petrus Regout and his descendants. Challenges to transforming the entire region into a recreational area are posed by the crossing of the A2 motorway and various railways through the area as well as the industrial area of Beatrixhaven.

The region spans six neighbourhoods of Maastricht namely:

- Amby: homestead Withuishof, homestead Gravenhof, house Severen, homestead Hagenhof (or Tiendschuur van Amby) and castle Geuselt
- Nazareth: castle Mariënwaard (La Grande Suisse), villa Petite Suisse and villa Kruisdonk
- Limmel: castles Bethlehem and Jerusalem
- Meerssenhoven: castles Vaeeshartelt and Meerssenhoven and villa Klein Vaeshartelt
- Itteren*: homestead Hartelstein
- Borgharen*: Borgharen castle and homestead Wiegershof

(* some publications do not include Itteren and Borgharen in the estate region)

And in Meerssen:

- Weert: homestead Weerterhof and villa Zonnevang
- Rothem: mill IJzeren Molen

== Municipalities ==
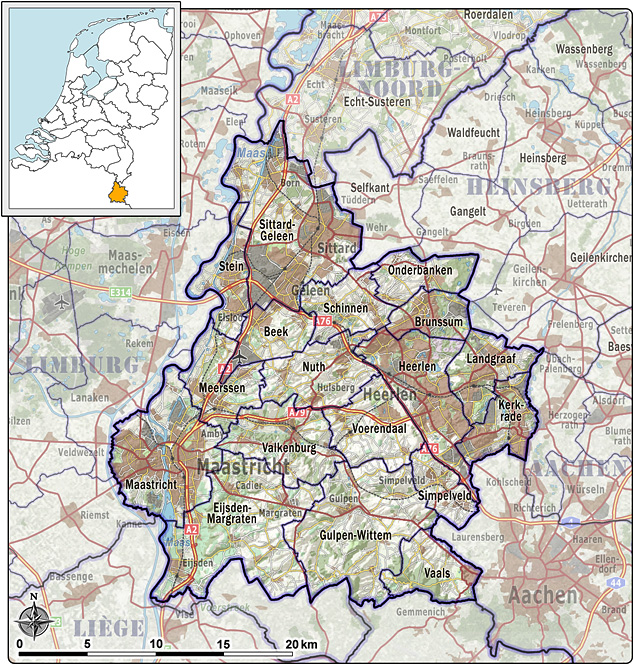
Map of South Limburg and its municipalities.

The South Limburg contains 18 administrative municipalities (gemeenten):

| Beek; Beekdaelen; Brunssum; Eijsden-Margraten; Gulpen-Wittem; Heerlen; Kerkrade; Landgraaf | Maastricht (capital of the entire Limburg province); Meerssen; Simpelveld; Sittard-Geleen; Stein; Vaals; Valkenburg aan de Geul; Voerendaal |

== Cities ==
| Name | Population; 2011/2012 | Notes |
| Maastricht | 121,000 |
| Heerlen | 89,000 | Does not have historical city rights |
| Kerkrade | 47,000 | Does not have historical city rights |
| Sittard | 38,000 |
| Geleen | 32,000 |
| Stein | 26,000 | Does not have historical city rights |
| Valkenburg | 6,000 |

== Impressions of South Limburg ==
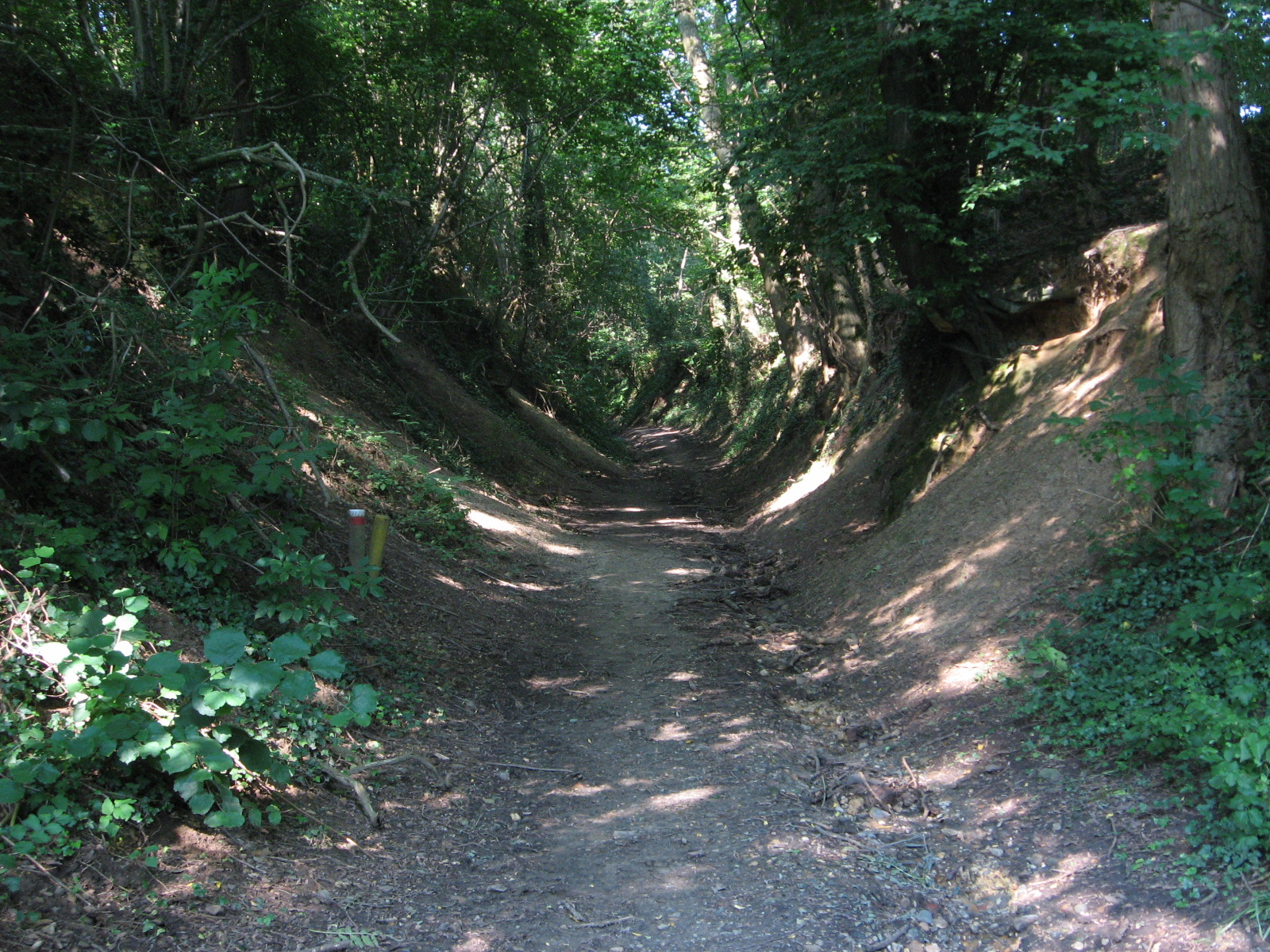
A sunken lane near Cadier en Keer

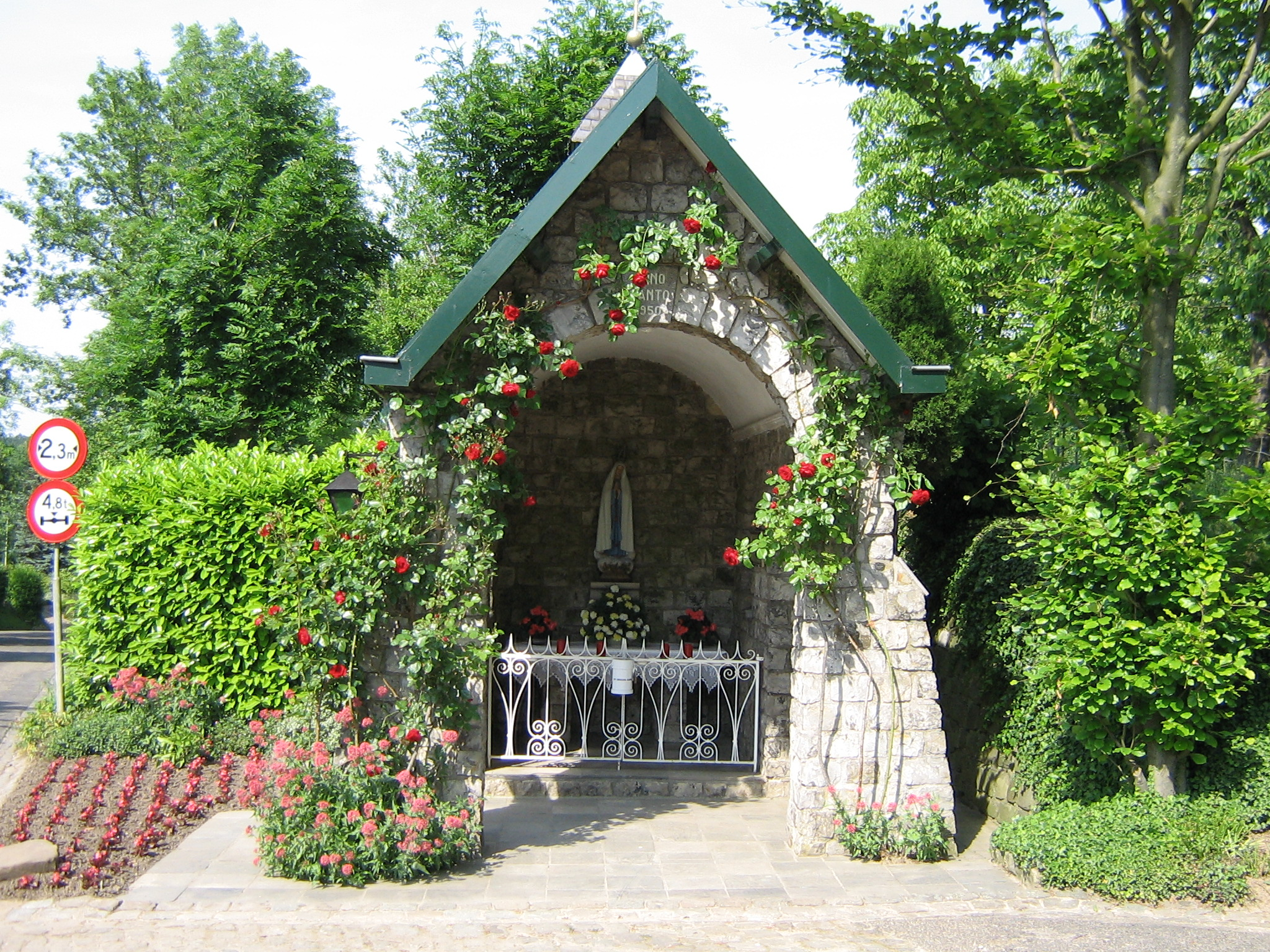
Chapel near Cadier en Keer

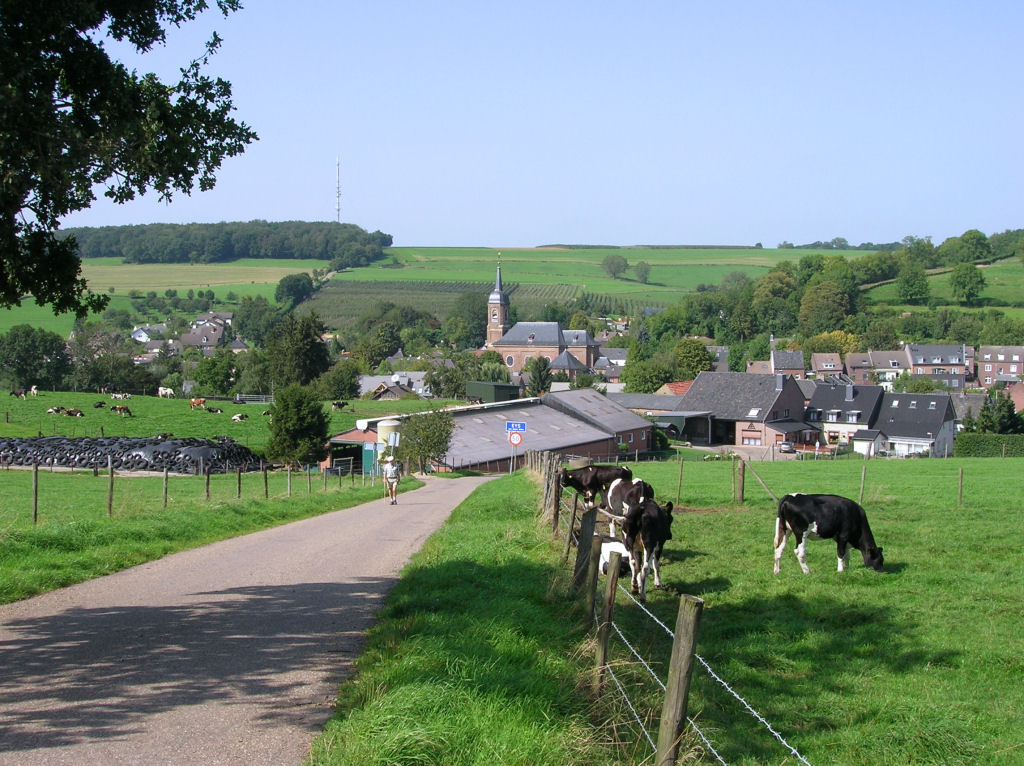
Town of Eys

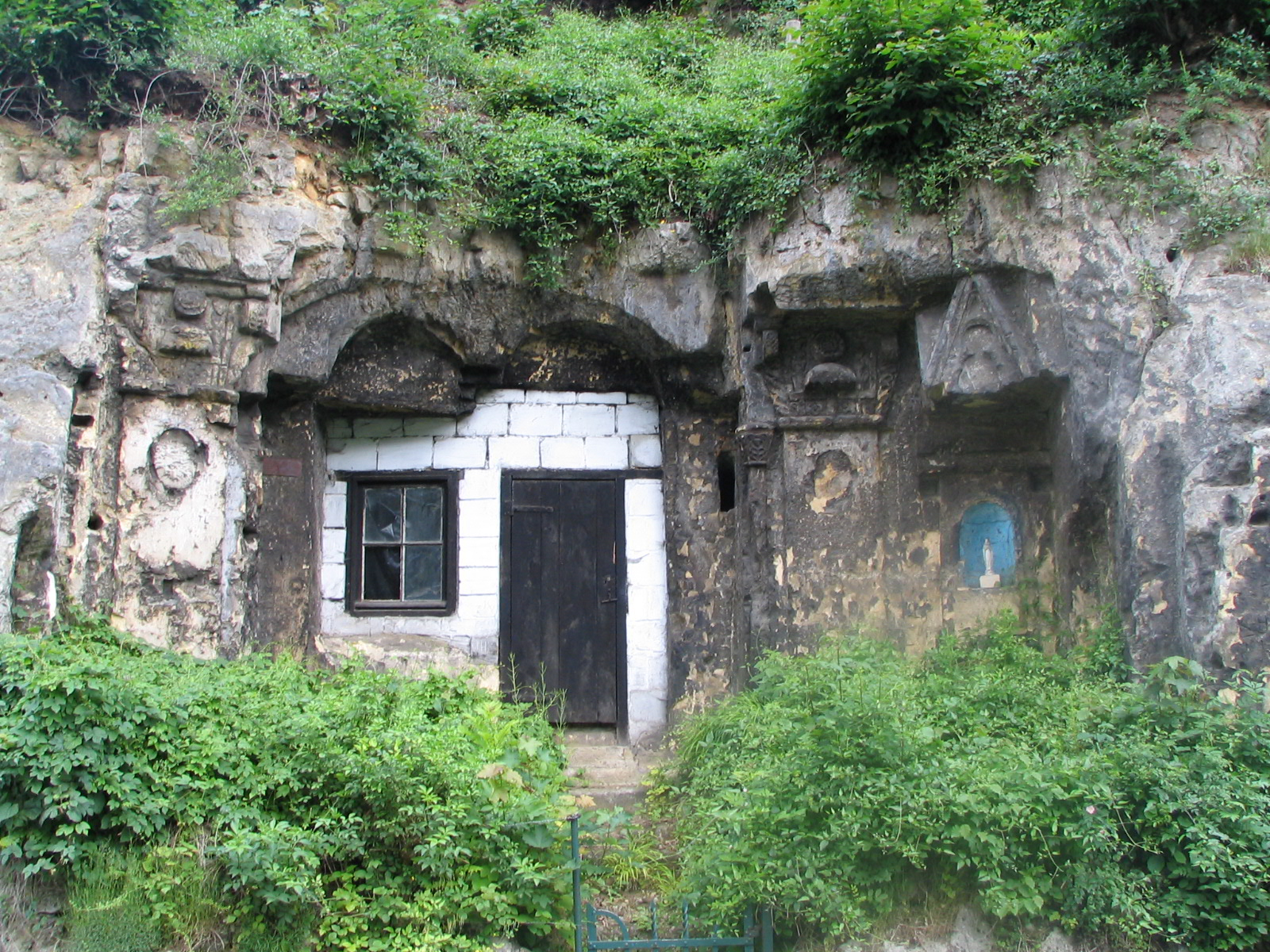
"Rock house" near Geulhem

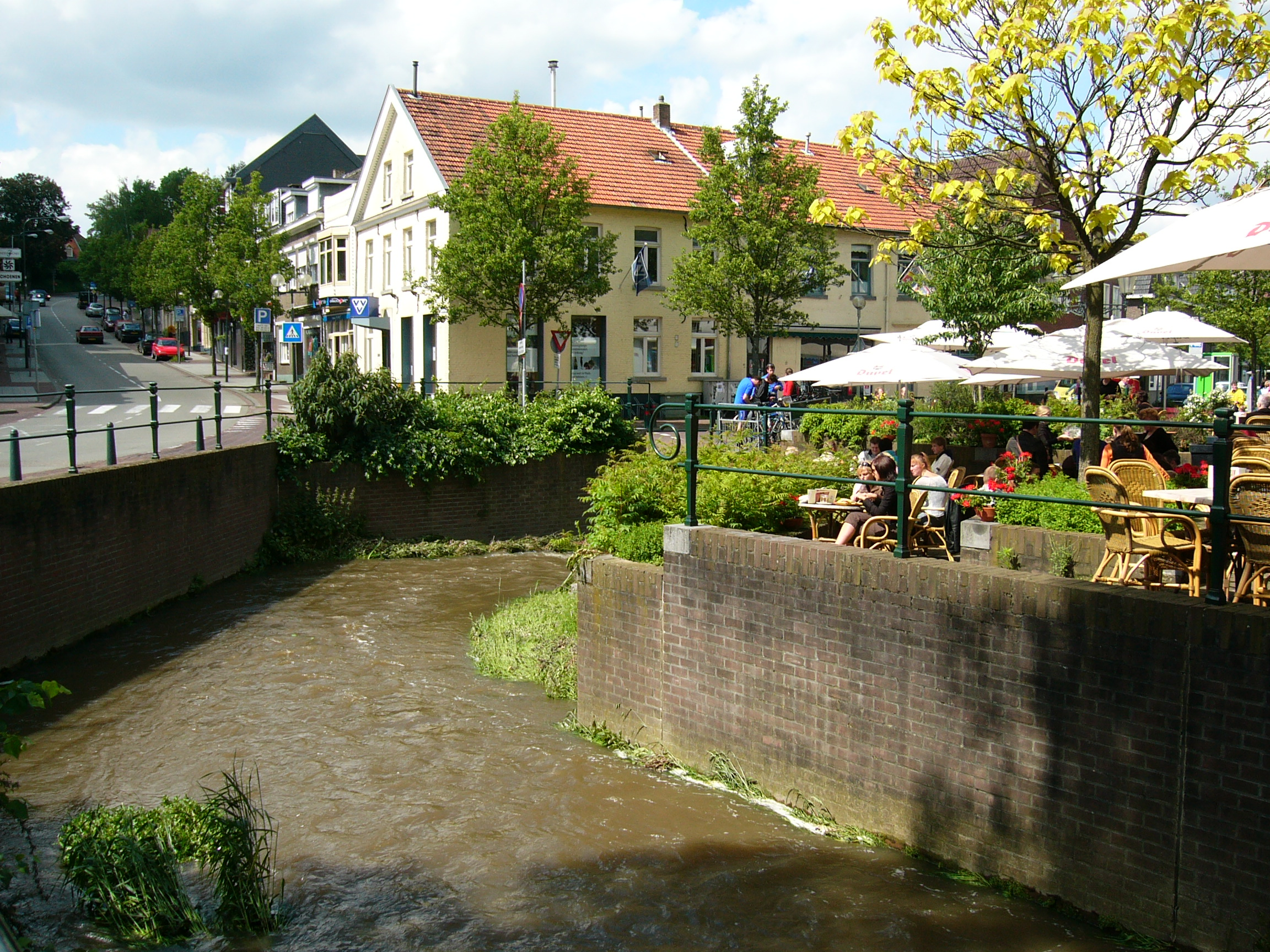
Town of Gulpen

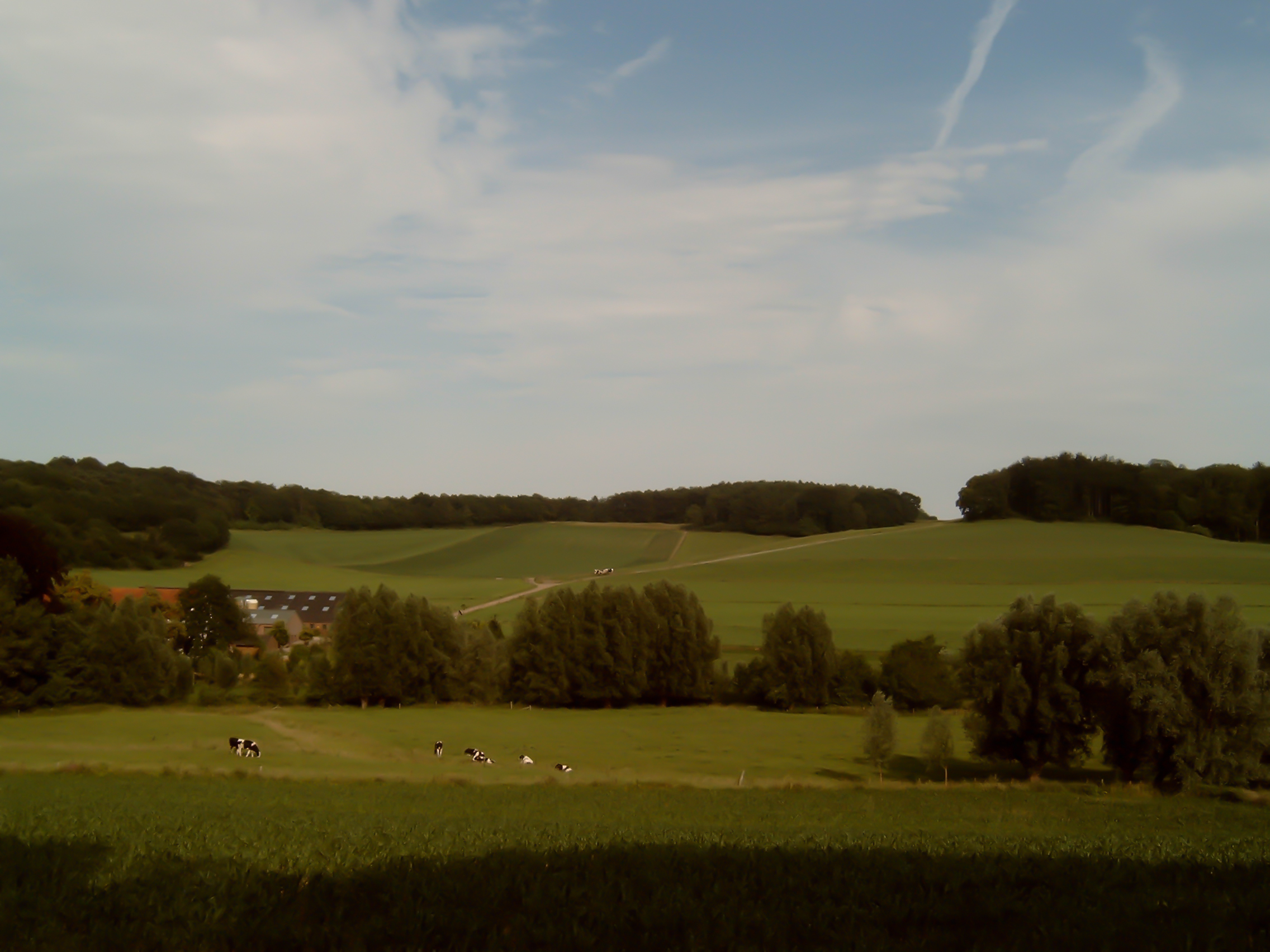
Hilly landscape between Gulpen and Slenaken

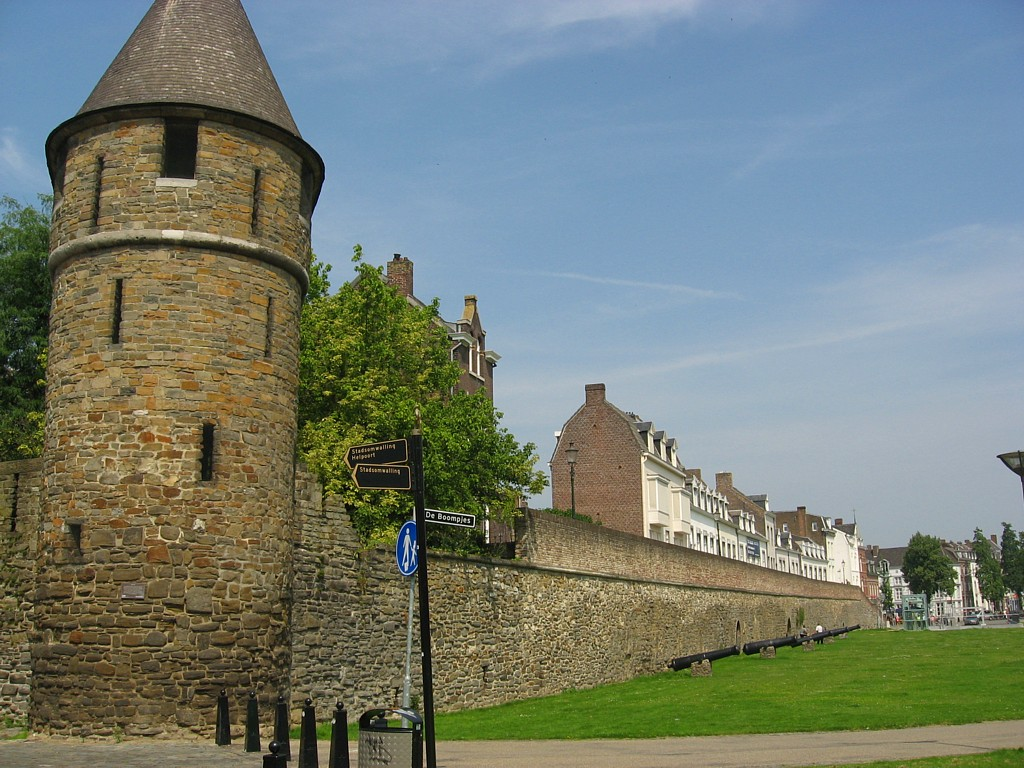
Onze-Lieve-Vrouwe-Embankment, Maastricht

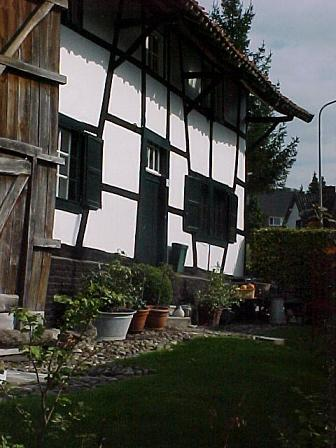
Timber framed house in Noorbeek

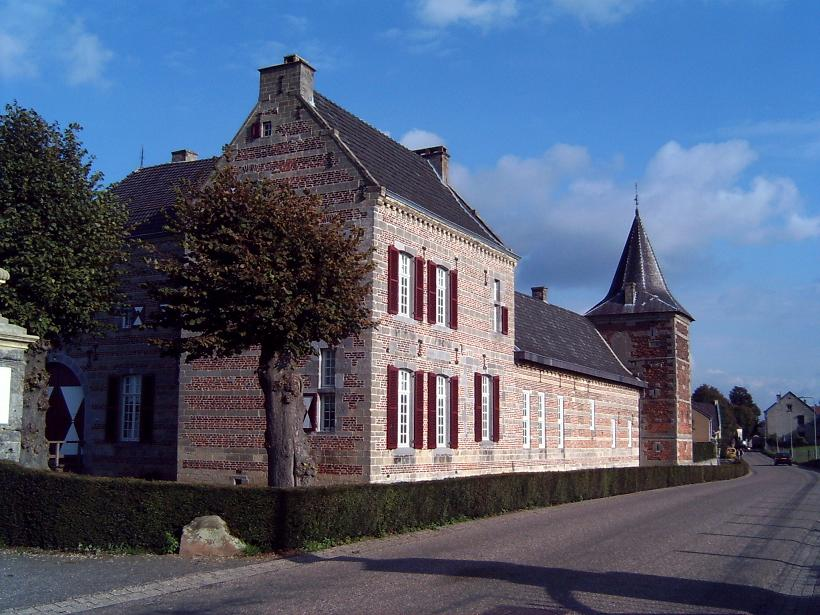
't Sibberhuuske, Sibbe

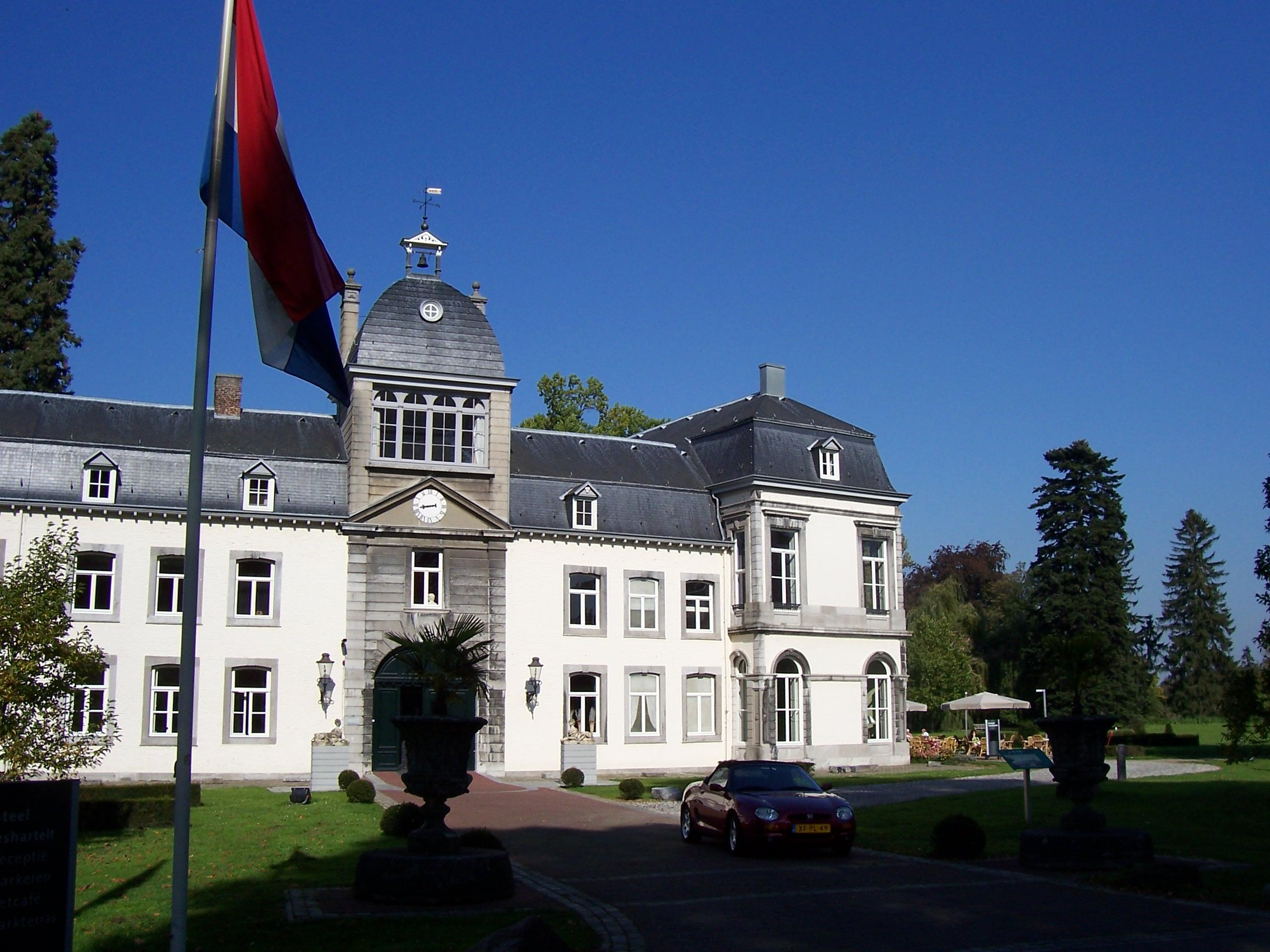
Estate region: Vaeshartelt Castle, Meerssen

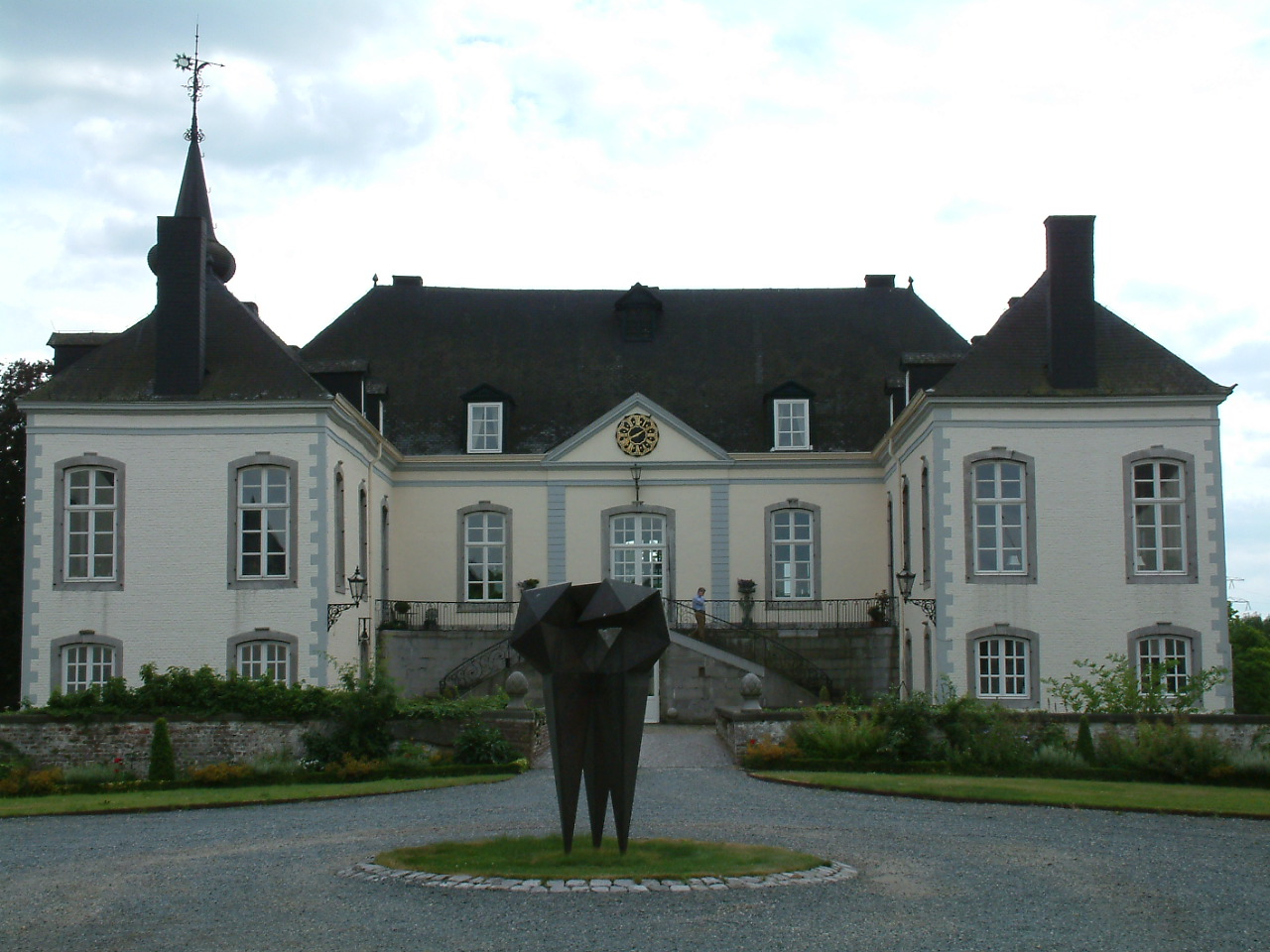
Estate region: Meerssenhoven

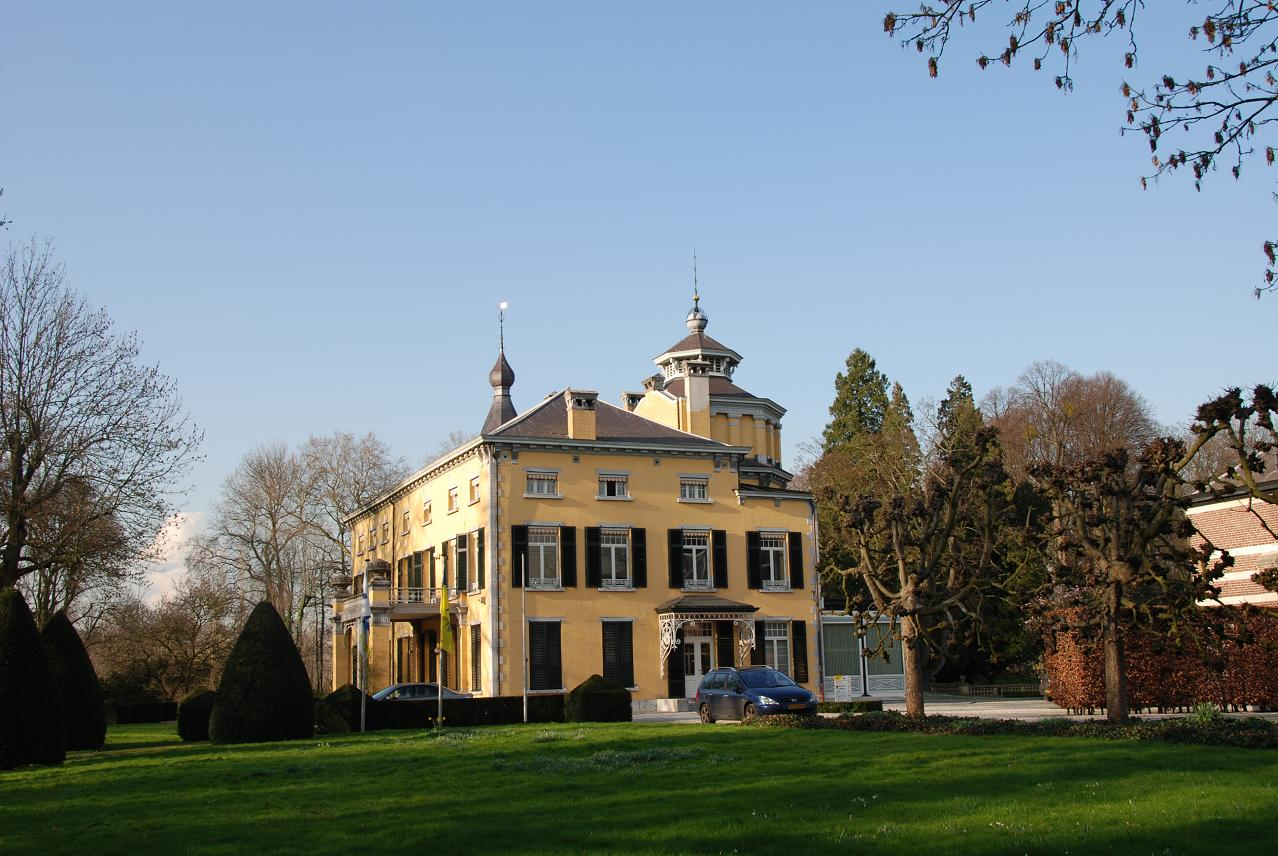
Estate region: Villa Kruisdonk

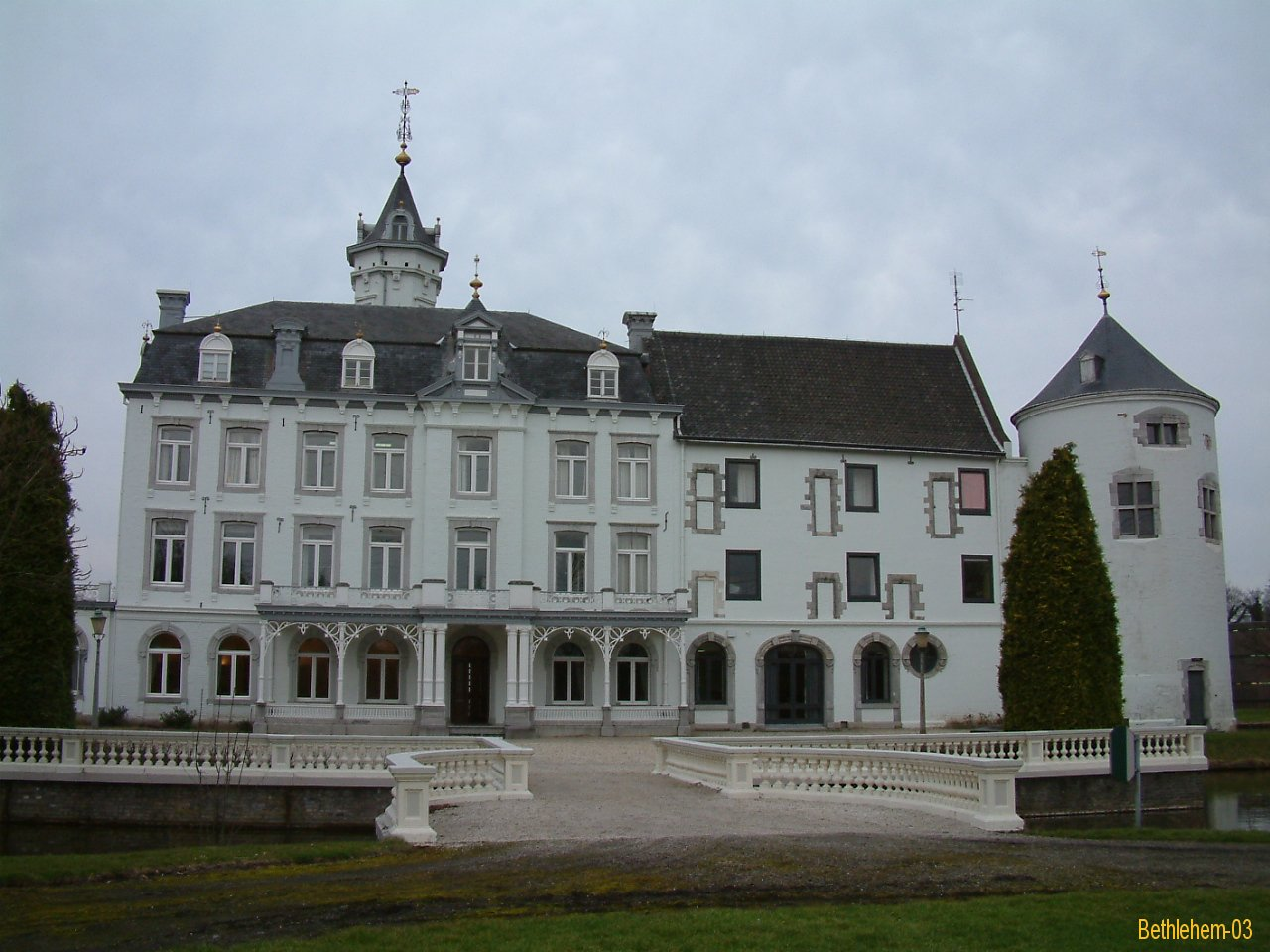
Estate region: Bethlehem Castle

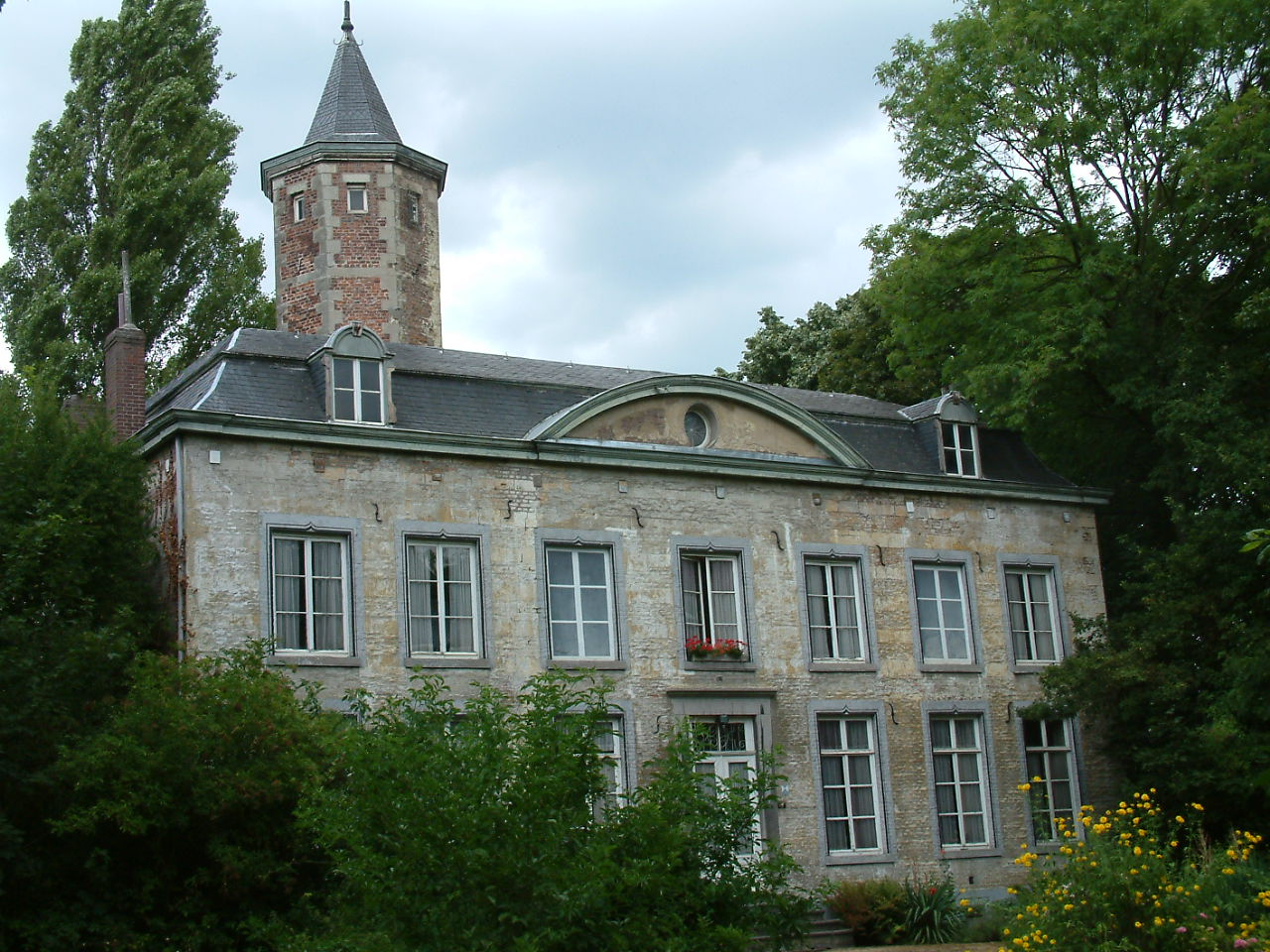
Estate region: Jerusalem Castle

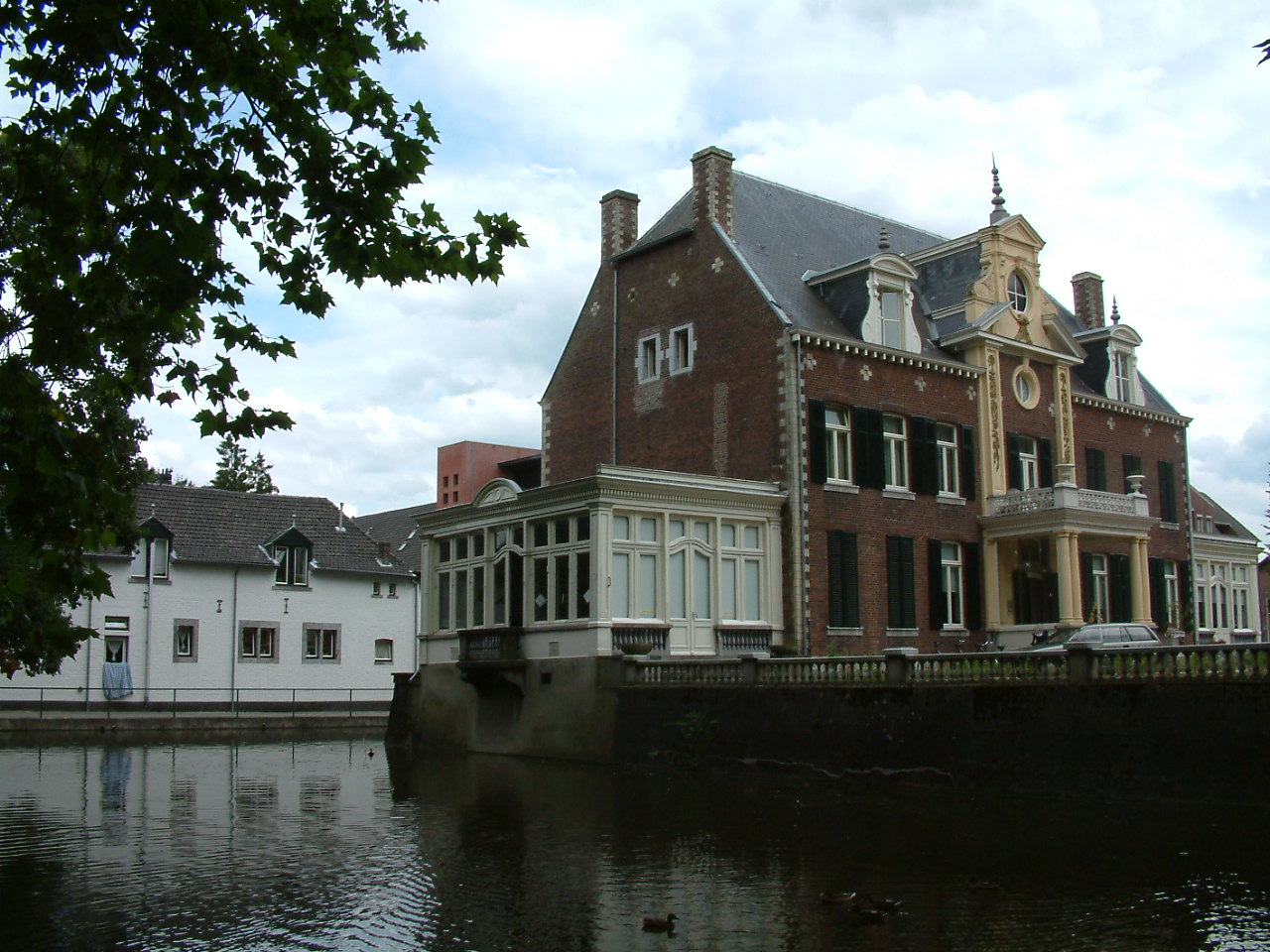
Estate region: Villa Severen

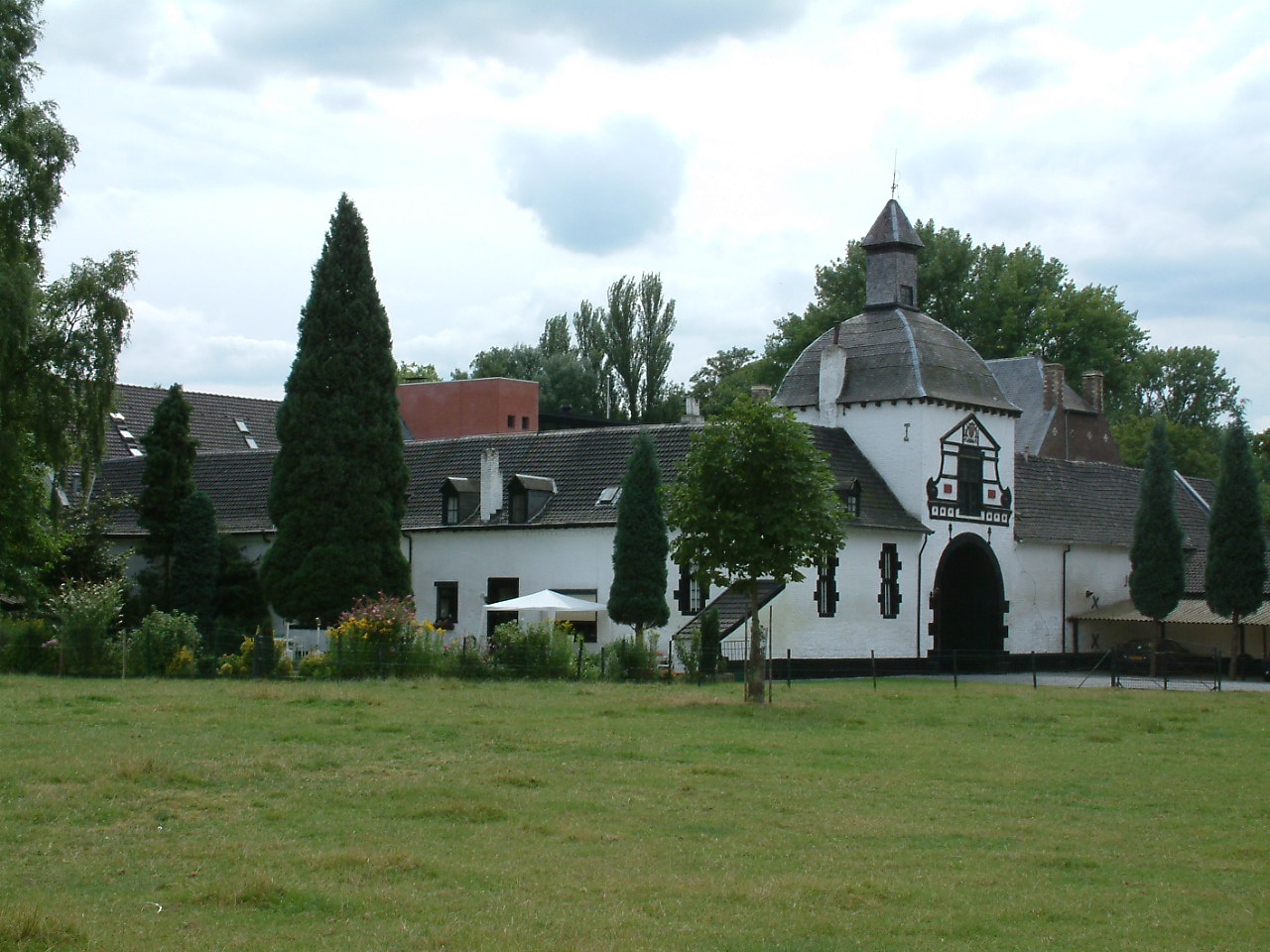
Estate region: Homestead Severen

== See also ==
- South Limburg (Belgium), region in the southern part of the Belgian province of Limburg
