= Mount Scenery =

Volcano in the Caribbean Netherlands

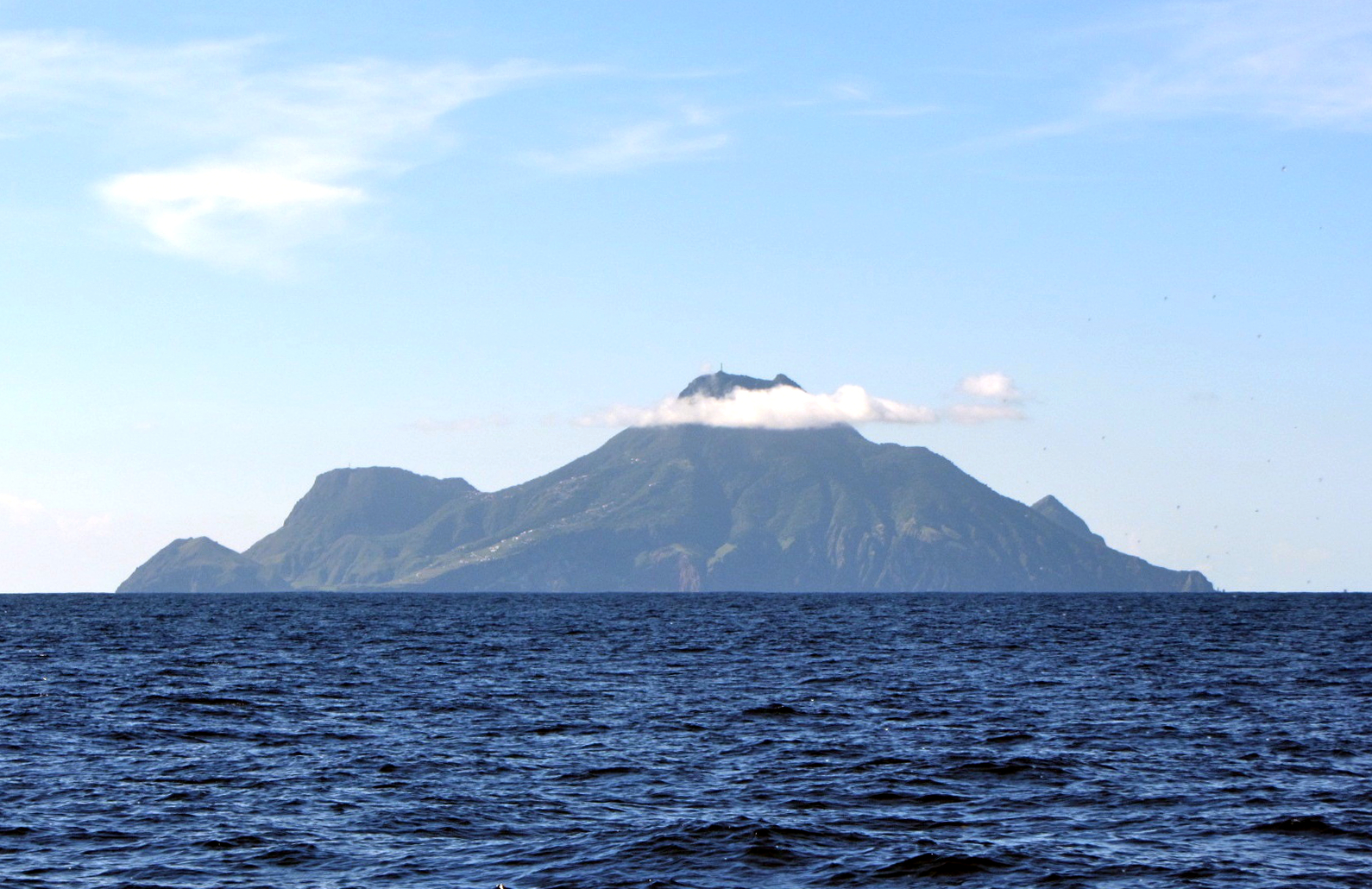
- Saba with Mount Scenery's peak in the clouds

Highest point
- Elevation: 870 m (2,850 ft)
- Prominence: 870 m (2,850 ft)
- Listing: Country high point
- Coordinates: 17°38′06″N 63°14′21″W

Geography
- Location within Saba Location within Lesser Antilles
- Location: Saba, Caribbean Netherlands

Geology
- Formed by: Subduction zone volcanism
- Mountain type: Stratovolcano with lava dome
- Volcanic arc: Lesser Antilles Volcanic Arc
- Last eruption: 1640

Mount Scenery is a dormant volcano in the Caribbean Netherlands. Its lava dome forms the summit of the Saba island stratovolcano. At an elevation of 870 m (2,854 ft), it is the highest point in both the Kingdom of the Netherlands, and, since the dissolution of the Netherlands Antilles on 10 October 2010, the highest point in the Netherlands proper.

The Saba volcano is potentially dangerous. It is currently classified as "dormant", which means it is an active volcano that is not erupting now, but could erupt in the future. The last eruption was in or around the year 1640 and included explosions and pyroclastic flows. The most recent major eruption was at least 5,000 years ago. According to the U.S. Global Volcanism Program, Saba's volcano is the northernmost active volcano in the Caribbean.

On 2 September 2019, Mount Scenery Nature Park was elevated to the status of national park. It has a hiking trail to the summit of the volcano, which is one of Saba's biggest tourist attractions. Along the way up the mountain are the multiple climate zones of Saba, including a cloud forest at the summit.

== History ==
The formation of Mount Scenery began about 500,000 years ago, when the subaerial part of Saba began forming. About 100,000 years ago, another phase of volcanic activity created the hills that surround The Bottom. It was likely during this time that Mount Scenery's lava dome summit formed. The last major eruption happened about 5,000 years ago, during the Holocene era. The volcano was plugged by a massive basalt rock, which is why there is no typical volcanic crater at Mount Scenery's summit.

Volcanic activity on Saba occurred up to the mid-17th century, just before European settlement on the island. Some of this activity may have occurred while Amerindians were living on the island, as it is believed that Amerindians inhabited the island (at least periodically) for approximately 2,500 years before Europeans arrived.

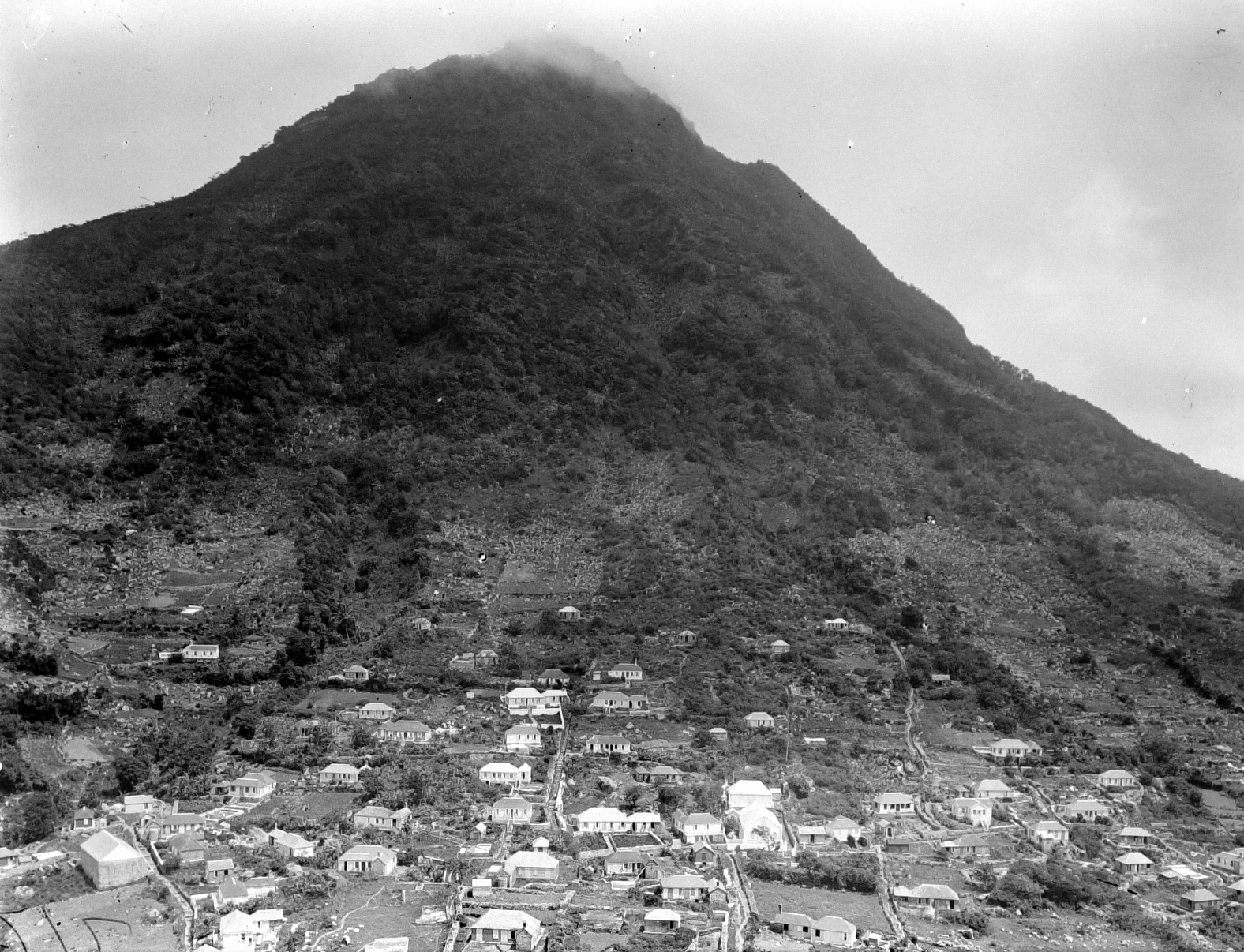
Farming plots on the slopes of Mt. Scenery, above Windwardside village (in 1909 or 1910)

During the early years of European settlement, Mount Scenery (known locally as "The Mountain" through the mid-20th century) was an important location for farming, and through the late 19th and early 20th century, the majority of Saban families were dependent upon "farming The Mountain" or fishing. Common foodstuffs farmed included bananas, white potatoes, sweet potatoes, tannias, cabbage, pumpkins, and onions. Farmers from the village of Windwardside farmed an area of The Mountain called "Big Rendez-Vous", and farmers from the village of St. Johns farmed an area called "Little Rendez-Vous". Today, most of the farmland on Mount Scenery is gone; although ruins of old farmland are visible on some of Saba's hiking trails.

In the late 1960s, a stone stairway was built from Windwardside to the summit of Mount Scenery, consisting of 1,064 steps. The stairway was built by hand, step by step, by local Sabans. Today the stairway is known as the Mount Scenery Trail, and is a popular hiking trail.

In 2018, Mount Scenery Nature Park was established. The park covers an area of approximately 3.42 square kilometres (1.32 sq mi), which is about 26% of Saba's total area. The park supports eco-tourism, maintains the trail system, protects biodiversity, and preserves historical structures. In 2019, the park was elevated to the status of national park, and is now called Mount Scenery National Park.

== Volcanic monitoring ==
Scientific monitoring of Mount Scenery's volcanic activity began in the 1970s. From 1978 to 1983, the Lamont–Doherty Geological Observatory monitored Saba's seismic activity. Between 1992 and 2004, the Seismic Research Center in Trinidad operated a seismometer on Mount Scenery's summit.

In 2006, the Royal Netherlands Meteorological Institute (KNMI) began monitoring seismic activity related to Mount Scenery. As of 2018, the KNMI had four seismic monitoring stations on Saba. Next to high-grade GNSS units on the slopes of the volcano, the KNMI installed cost-effective GNSS units in 2022. One of the latter is located near the top of Mount Scenery. These units are solar-powered, and were installed as part of a pilot study to assess the suitability of cost-effective GNSS use for monitoring volcanic activity.

== Hiking ==
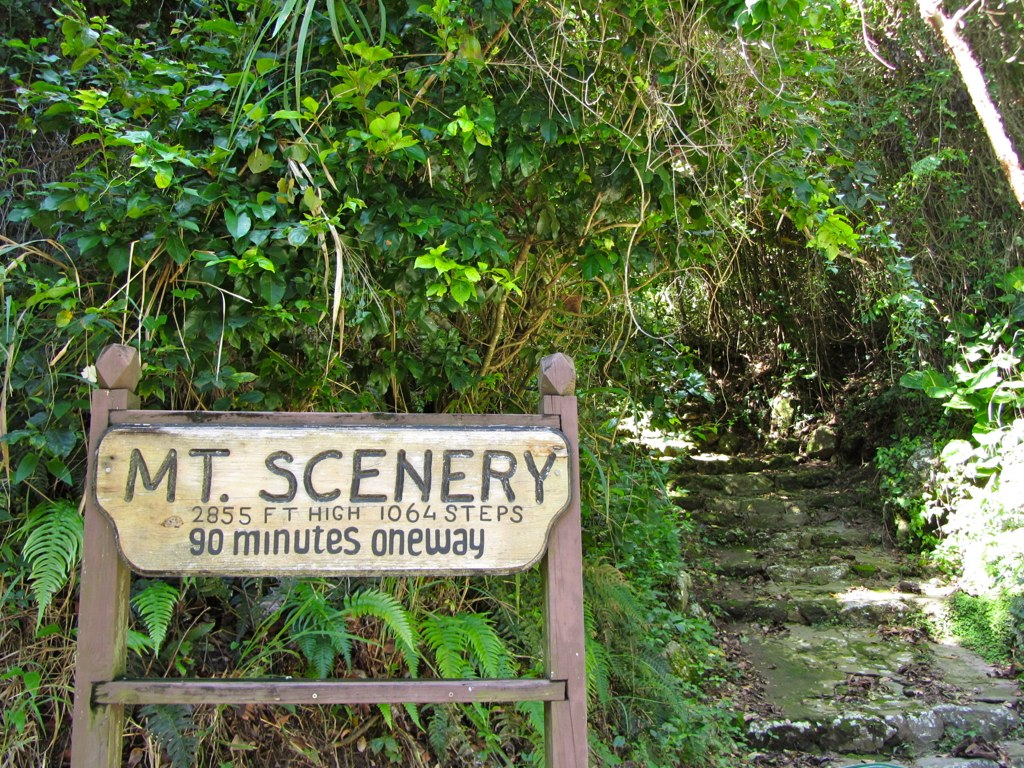
Mount Scenery Trail trailhead in Windwardside

=== Mount Scenery Trail ===
The Mount Scenery Trail is Saba's most popular hiking trail. The trail is a strenuous out-and-back trail, which goes up 1064 steps to Mt. Scenery's summit and back. It takes about 90 minutes each way.

The main trailhead for Mt. Scenery Trail is located on the road just outside Windwardside, across from the Trail Shop. There are two alternative accesses to the trail: one from the end of the Mountain Road, which reduces the hike by about 25 minutes; and one from the Bud's Mountain Trail, which joins the Mt. Scenery trail at the highest shelter. At the top of the trail, there are three different viewpoints of the island.

The lower portion of the trail goes through rainforest and secondary rainforest. Here hikers can see tree ferns, Elephant Ears (Taro), wild plantains (Heliconia), Mountain Palm (Euterpe precatoria), and "Mountain Manna" (Begonia retusa). The upper 50 metres (160 ft) of the trail is a cloud forest called the Elfin Forest. Here hikers can see Mountain Mahogany, as well as orchids, liverworts, mosses, ferns, and other epiphytes.

=== The Elfin Trail ===
The Elfin Trail is Saba's newest hiking trail, established in 2018. The trail begins on the Sandy Cruz Trail, and ends when it intersects with the Mount Scenery Trail. The hike takes about 1 hour one-way.

The trail follows the old paths used by farmers of earlier generations. Hikers of the trail will go through three ecosystems: woodlands, rainforest, and cloud forest. Hikers can see Elephant Ears (Taro), Mountain Fuchsia, Maxillaria Orchids, large Banana trees, and other flora. The trail also provides views of Old Booby Hill, Cove Bay, and the airport.

== Communications technology ==
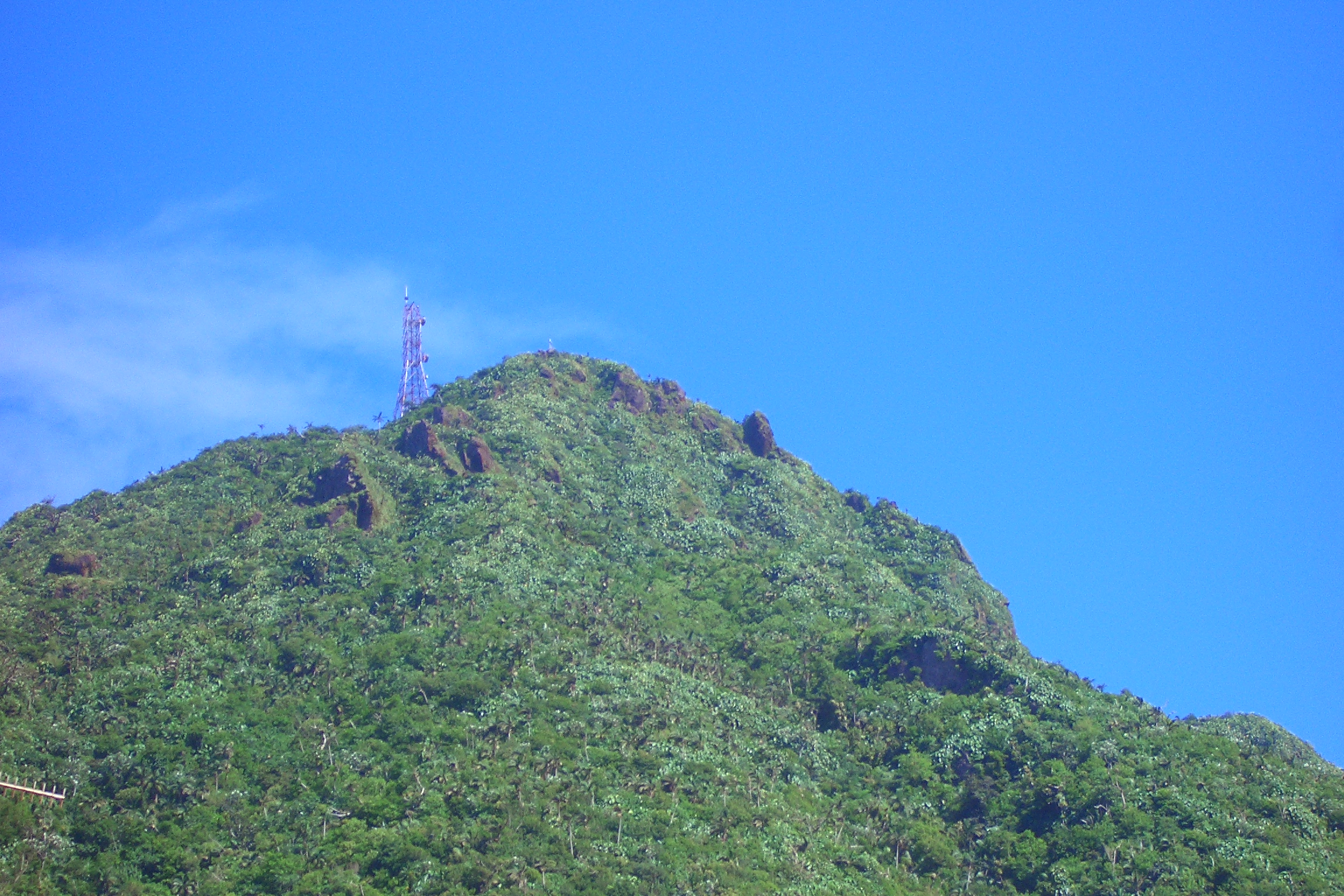
The former communications tower near the top of Mt. Scenery in 2004

In 1972, British Cable & Wireless began construction of a microwave relay station near the top of Mount Scenery. The purpose of the microwave relay was to link the islands of Antigua and Tortolla via Saba. Though no longer in operation, the relay station and tower still stood near the top of Mount Scenery up to 2026 when it was replaced by a radar tower.

JRCC Curaçao (the Dutch Caribbean Coast Guard Joint Rescue Coordination Center at Curaçao), has one of its emergency monitoring stations located on Mount Scenery. The station, "DSC Station Mt. Scenery", is a Digital Selective Calling (DSC) station, meaning that it has "equipment that allows mariners to instantly send or receive automatically formatted distress alerts to vessels and coast stations in the area". DSC Station Mt. Scenery provides 24-hour monitoring with a range of 70 nautical miles (130 km; 81 mi).

On the lower slopes of Mount Scenery in the village of St. Johns, the St. John's Lighthouse was constructed. The navigational aid is a 15-metre-high (49 ft) tower mounted to a 1-story white concrete base. Its light emits two white flashes every 10 seconds.

== Gallery ==
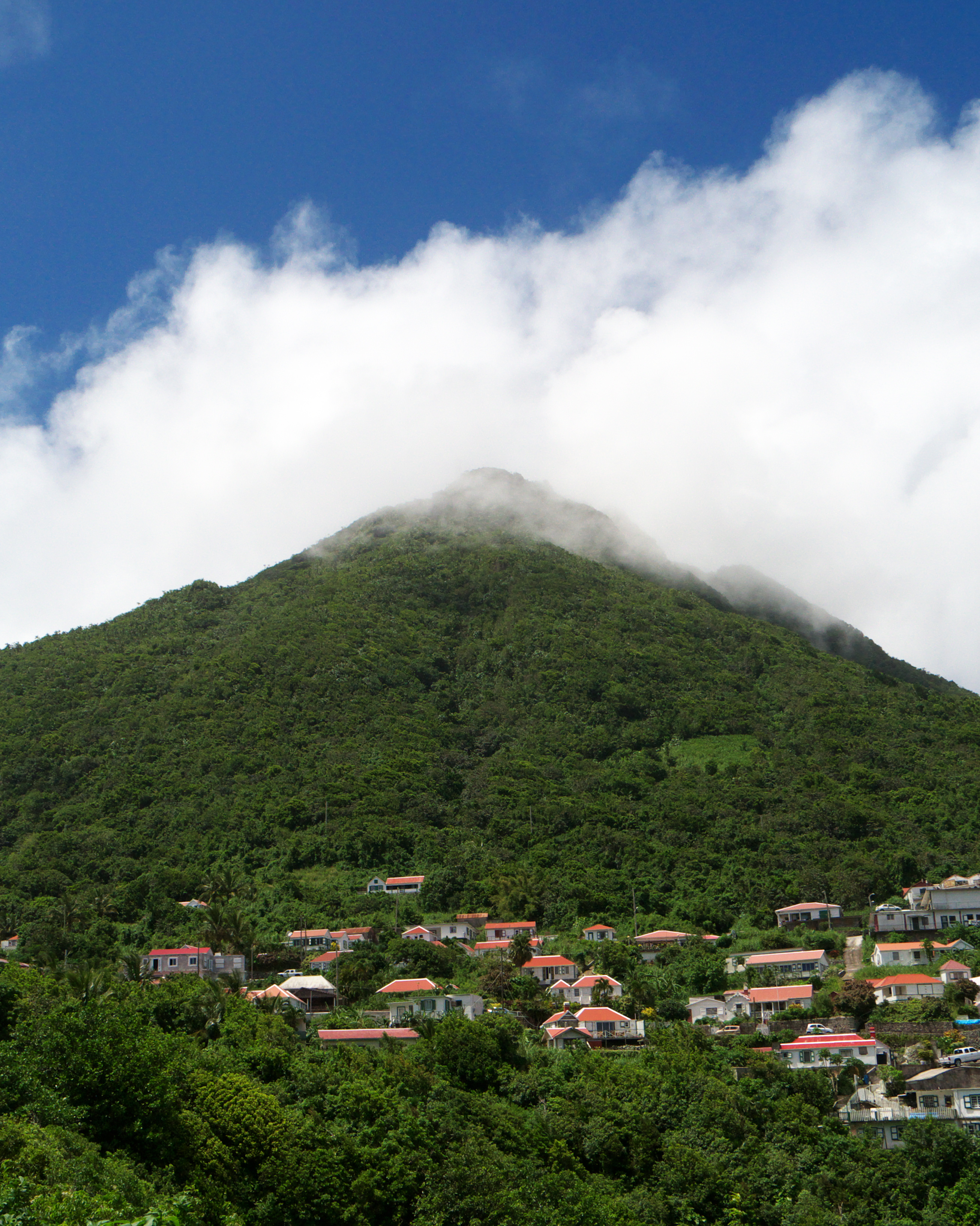
Mount Scenery in the clouds, as seen from Windwardside

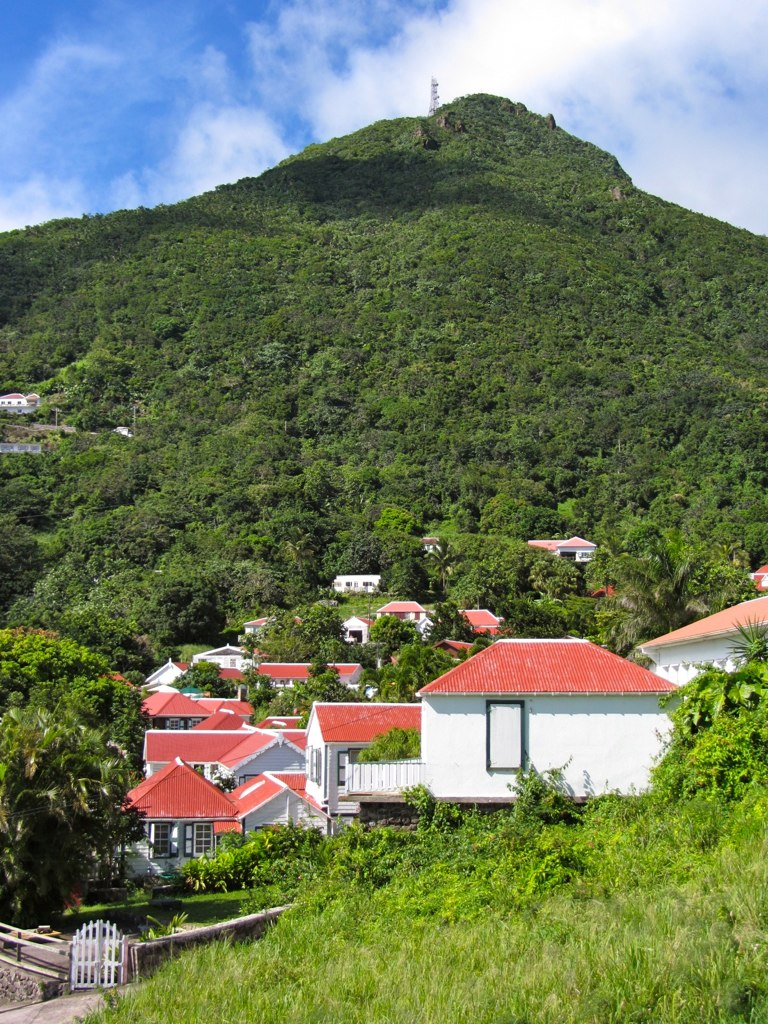
Mount Scenery as seen from Windwardside

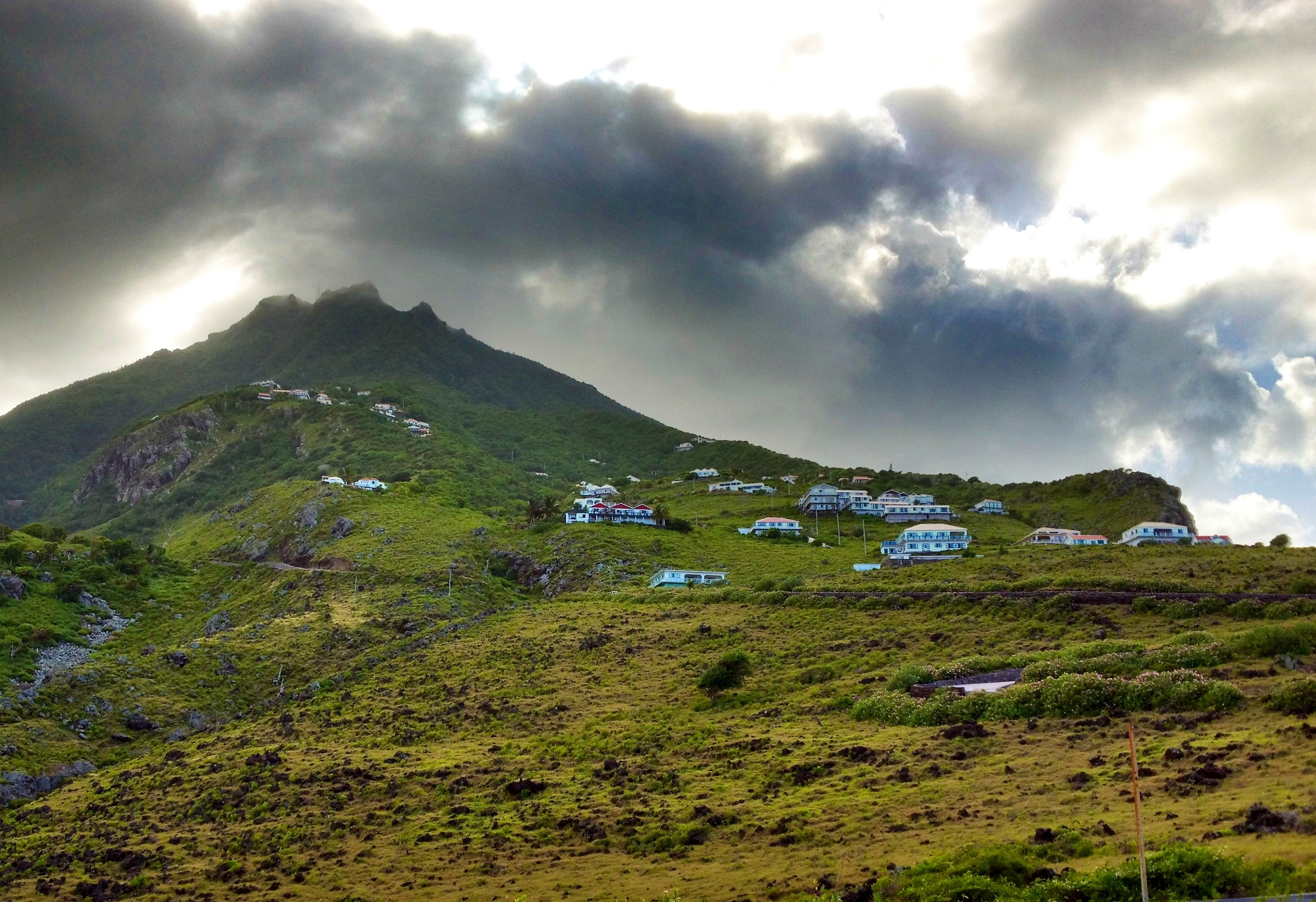
Mount Scenery as seen from Lower Hell's Gate

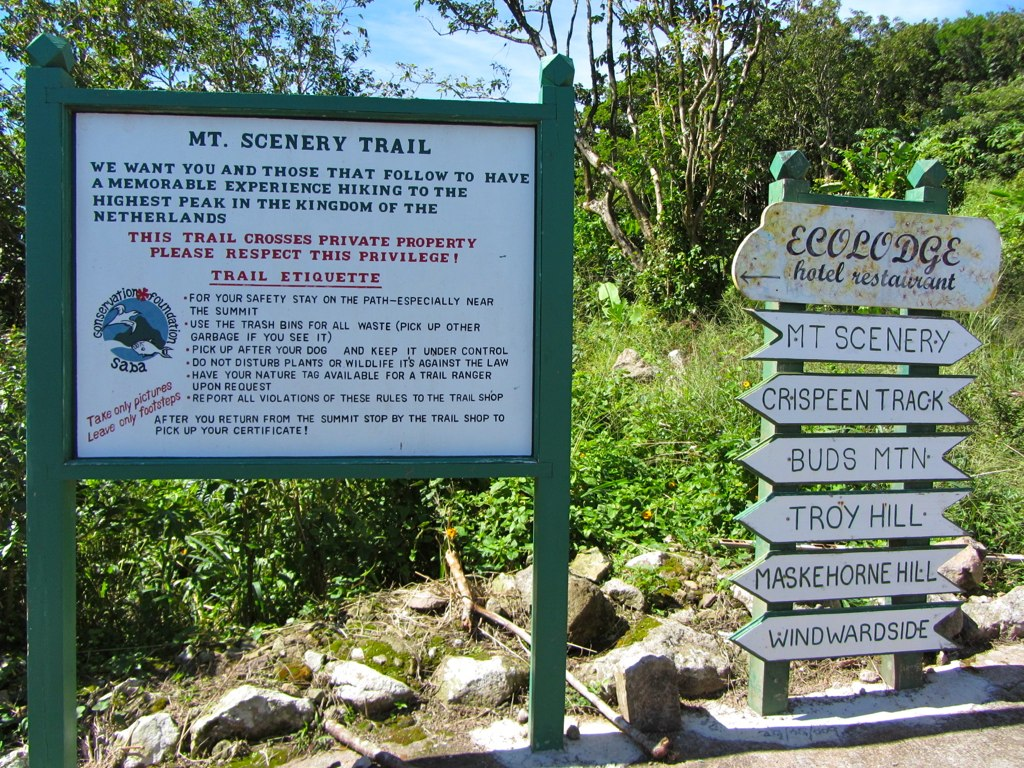
One of the Mount Scenery trailheads

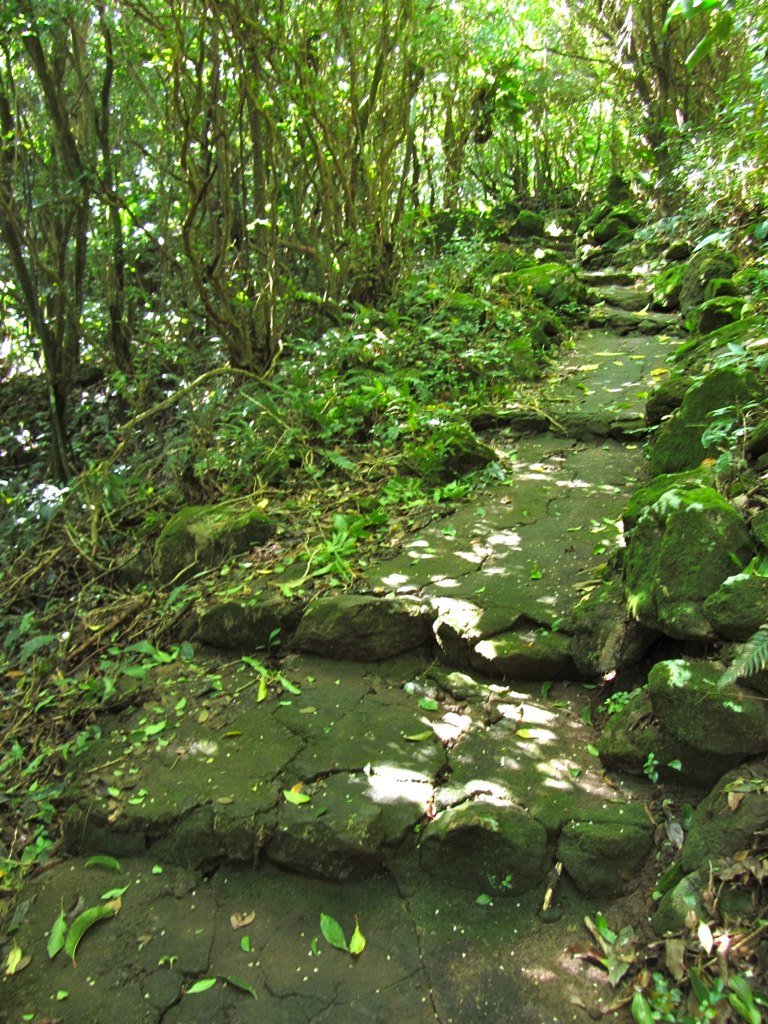
Mount Scenery Trail steps

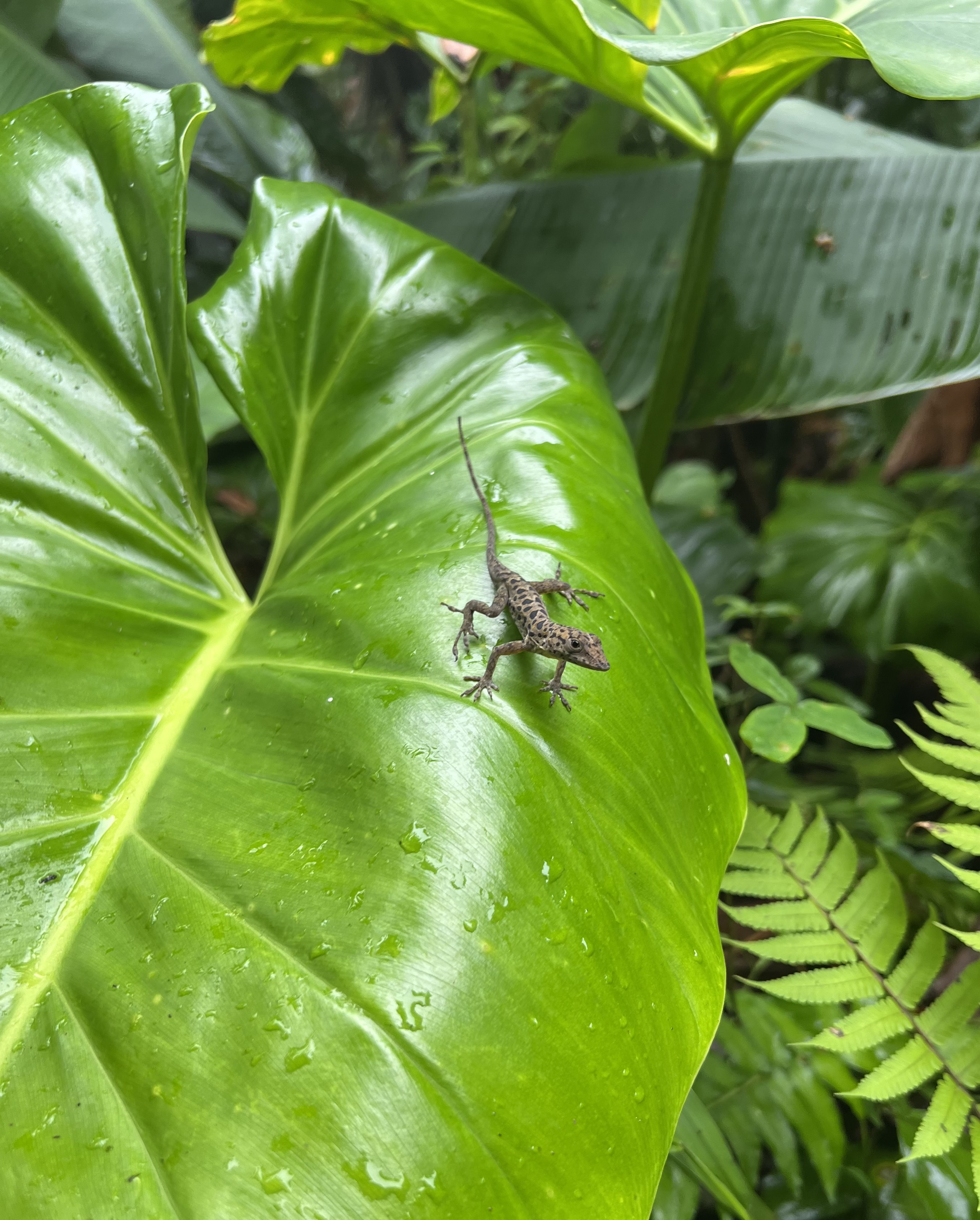
Saba anole on an Elephant ear, on the Mount Scenery Trail

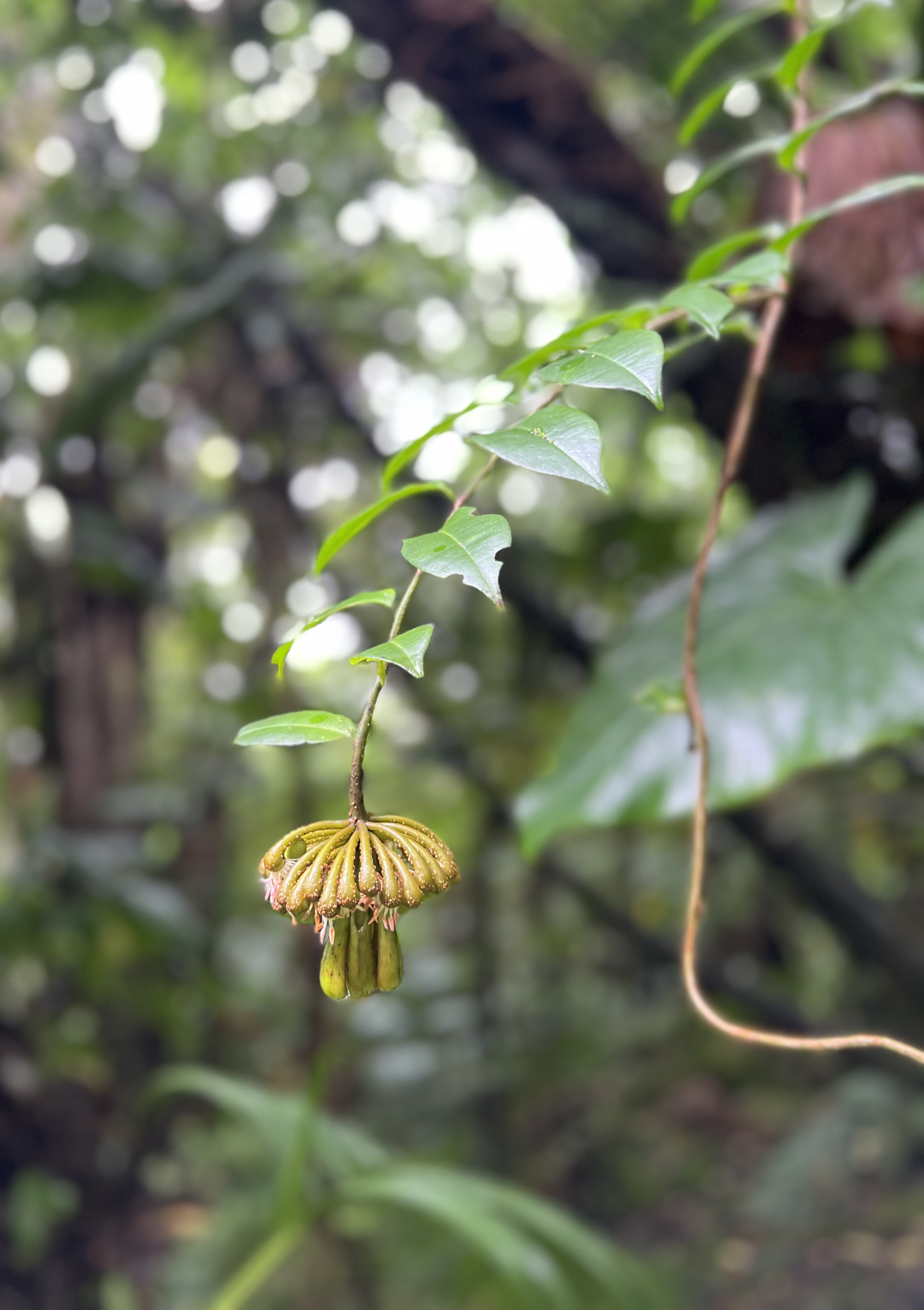
Marcgravia umbellata on the Mount Scenery Trail

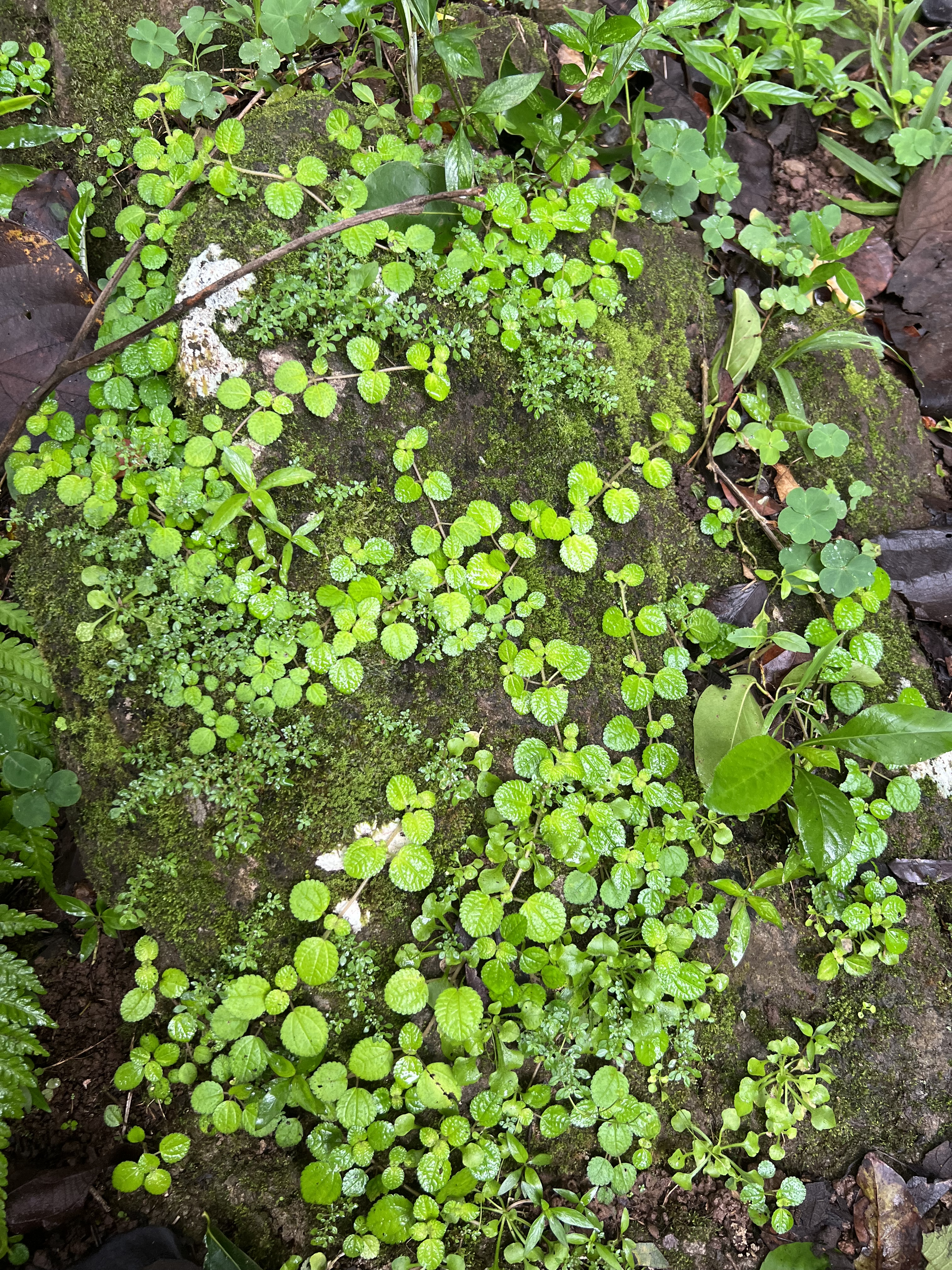
Creeping Charlie on the Mount Scenery Trail

== See also ==
- List of volcanoes in the Netherlands
- List of highest points in the Netherlands
- Vaalserberg - the highest point in European Netherlands
