= Vaalserberg =

Highest point in mainland Netherlands and tripoint with Belgium and Germany

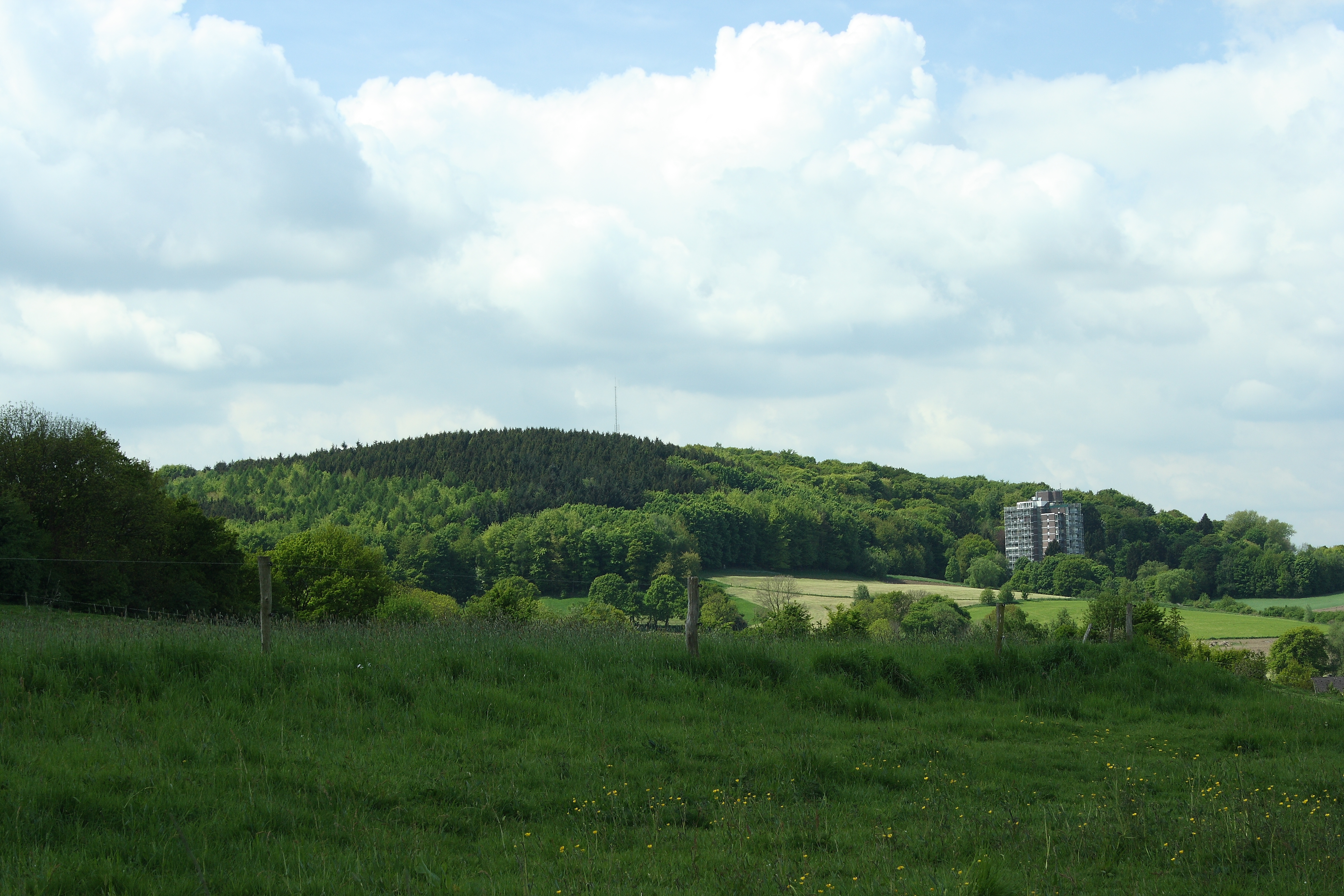
- The Vaalserberg seen from Aachen

Highest point
- Elevation: 322.4 m (1,058 ft)NAP
- Coordinates: 50°45′17″N 6°01′15″E

Naming
- English translation: Vaals' Mountain
- Language of name: Dutch

Geography
- Location within Netherlands Location within Belgium Location within North Rhine-Westphalia
- Location: Limburg, Netherlands

The Vaalserberg (Dutch pronunciation: [ˈvaːlsərˌbɛr(ə)x]; Limburgish: Vaolserberg [ˈvɒː˦˨lsəʀˌbæː˦˨˧ʀəx]) is a hill with a height of 322.4 metres (1,058 ft) above NAP that is the highest point in the European part of the Netherlands. The Vaalserberg is located in the province of Limburg, at the south-easternmost edge of the country, near the town of Vaals (after which it is named).

The Vaalserberg was the highest point anywhere in the Netherlands until the Caribbean island of Saba, with its 887-metre-high (2,910-foot) volcano, was incorporated into the country as a "special municipality" in 2010.

== Three-country point ==
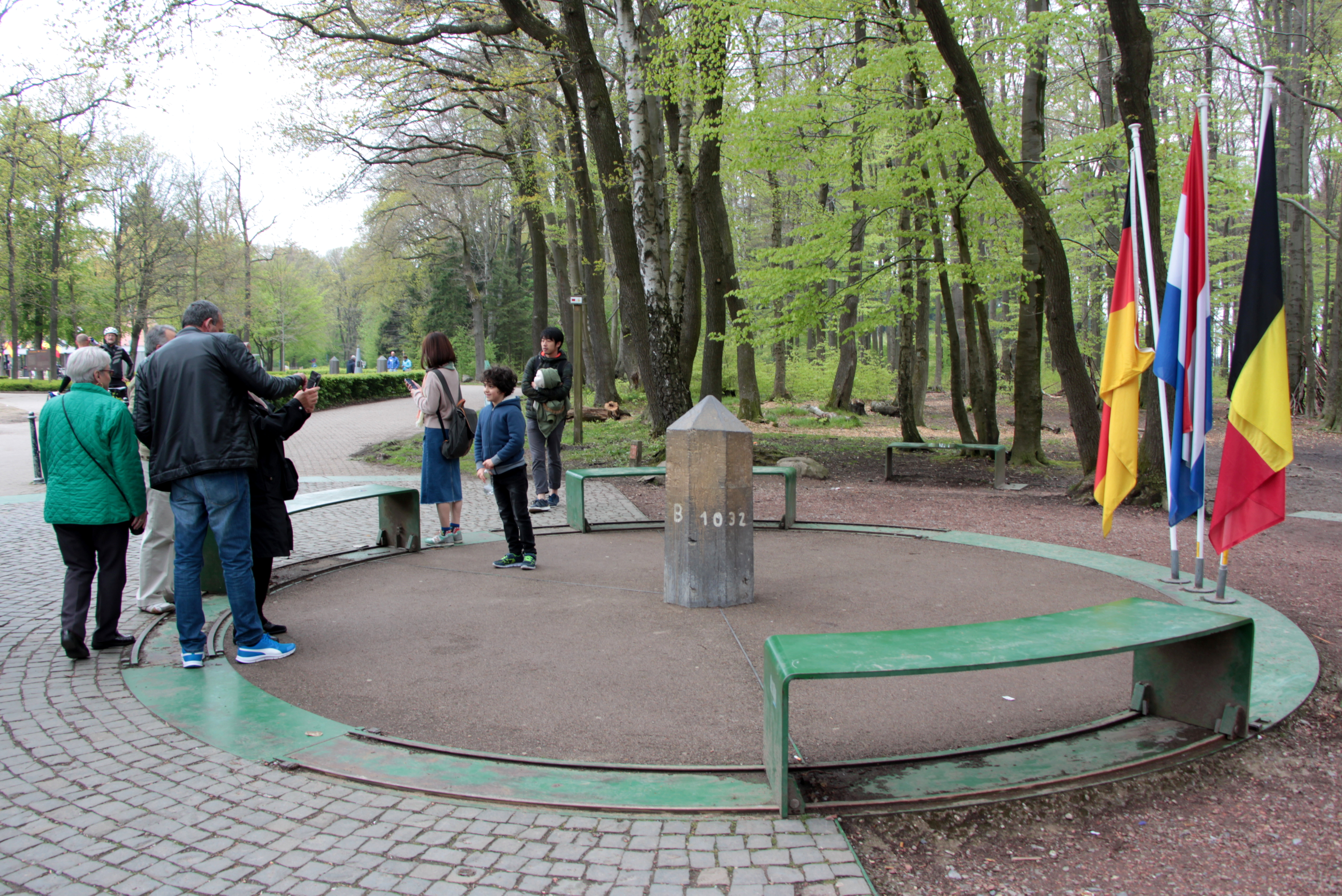
The Three-Country Point with the border post dating back to 1926

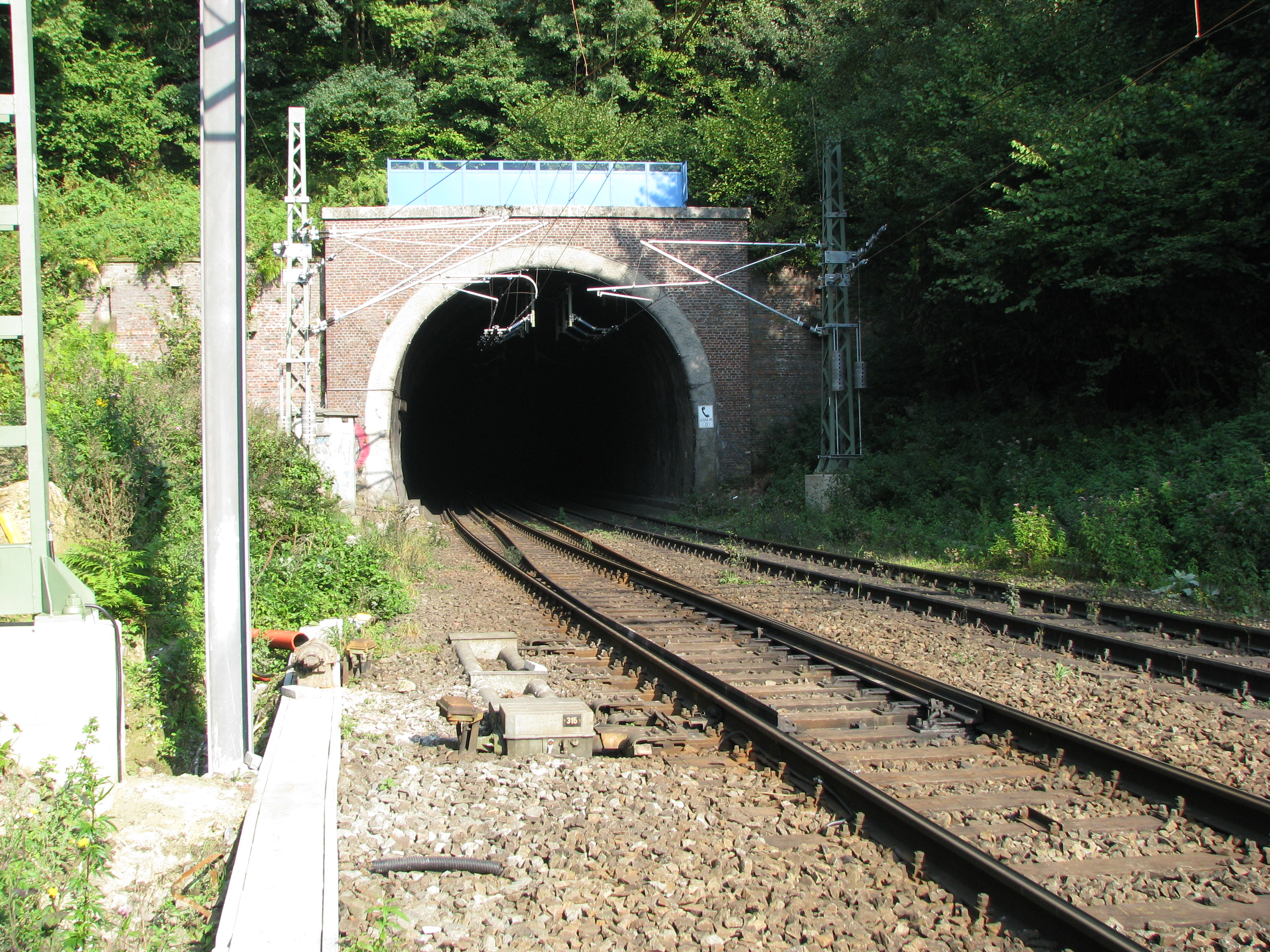
Gemmenicher Tunnel

The Vaalserberg is also the location of the tripoint between Germany, Belgium and the Netherlands and so its summit is called the Drielandenpunt ("three country point") in Dutch, Dreiländereck ("three country corner") in German and Trois Frontières ("three borders") or Trois Bornes ("three border stones") in French.

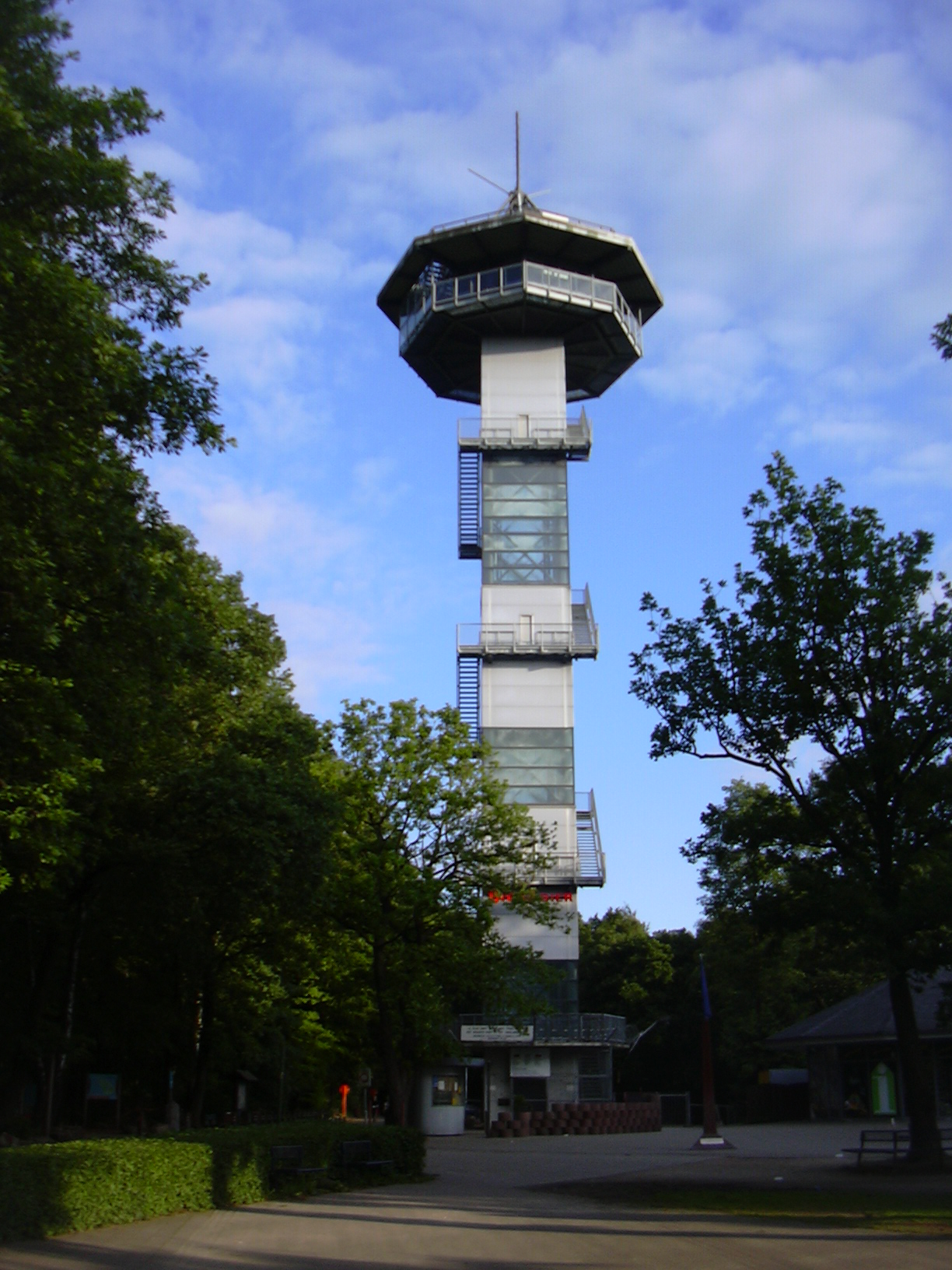
The Boudewijntoren observation tower

On the Belgian side, the tripoint borders the region of Wallonia, including both the regular French-speaking area and the smaller German-speaking area. The German side falls within the city limits of Aachen in the state of North Rhine-Westphalia. Between 1830 and 1919, the summit was a quadripoint, also bordering Neutral Moresnet, which is now part of Belgium's German-speaking area.

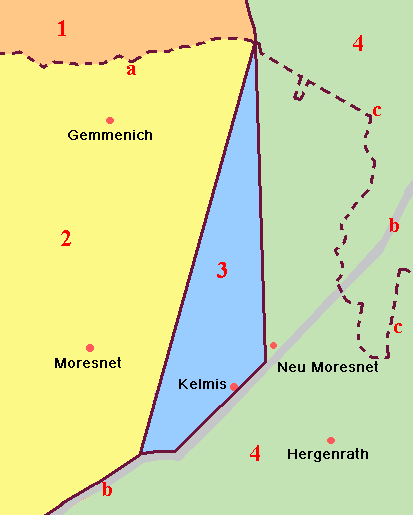
Historical borders before First World War. Vaalserberg is located at the quadripoint in the top central area of the map. Legend: (1) Dutch Province of Limburg (2) Belgian (previously United Dutch) Liège Province (3) Neutral Moresnet (4) Prussian Rhine Province

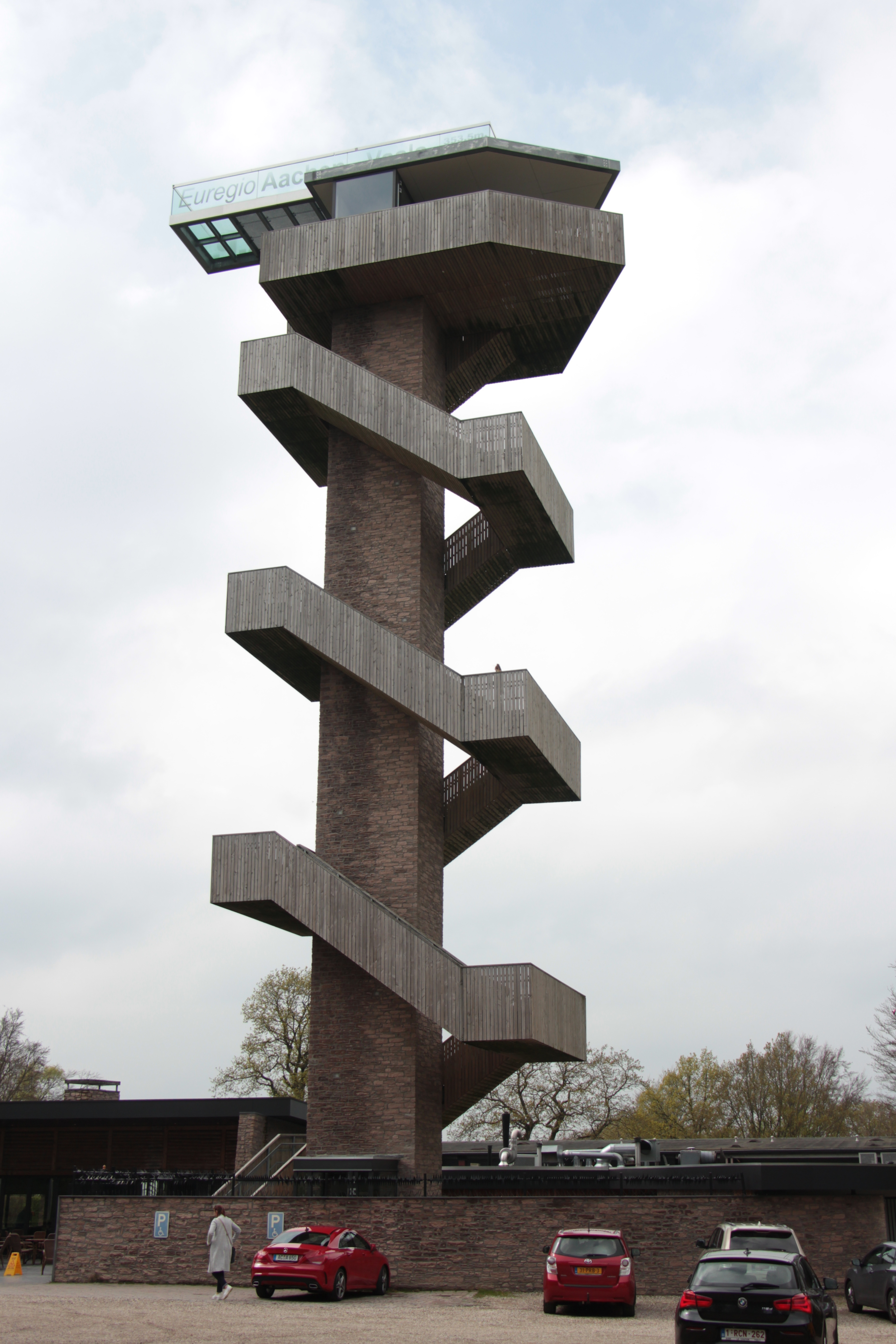
The new Wilhelminatoren observation tower

The current Belgian-German border is not the same as the former eastern border of Moresnet with Prussia but is a little more to the east. Therefore, five different borders came together at this point but never more than four at one time, except possibly between 1917 and 1920, when the border situation was unclear and disputed.

The border intersection has made the Vaalserberg a well-known tourist attraction in the Netherlands, with a 50-metre (160 ft) tower on the Belgian side (Dutch: Boudewijntoren; French: Tour Baudouin; German: Balduin-Turm), opened in 1994 to replace the previous 33-metre (108 ft) tower, built in 1970. It offers a grand panorama of the surrounding landscape.

140 metres (460 ft) south of the point, a railway crosses the German-Belgian border in the Gemmenicher Tunnel. It is the freight-only railway between Tongeren and Aachen.

In 2025, Esperantists launched an initiative to rename the Vaalserberg to Monto Zamenhof, in order to draw attention to the history of Amikejo, a proposed Esperanto-speaking state in the former Neutral Moresnet, and to honour the founder of the Esperanto language, L. L. Zamenhof. The Universal Esperanto Association officially supports the initiative.

== Four-borders road ==
The road leading up to this point on the Dutch side is called the Viergrenzenweg ("four borders way"), probably because of the former territory of Neutral Moresnet. The names of the roads in Belgium (Route des Trois Bornes) and Germany (Dreiländerweg) refer to the present three bordering countries.

Along the road on the Dutch side is the 35 metres (115 ft) Wilhelminatoren observation tower, with a restaurant and forest trails. The present tower officially opened on 7 October 2011 and features a lift and a glass floor. The first tower at the site was built in 1905 during the reign of its namesake, Queen Wilhelmina of the Netherlands, and was demolished in 1945. The second 20 metres (66 ft) tower opened on 11 August 1951 and was demolished over the winter of 2010–2011 because of its poor condition and high maintenance requirements.

== Road cycling ==
The Vaalserberg is often used in the Amstel Gold Race and is climbed halfway through the race. The climb is named in the roadbook of the Gold Race as Drielandenpunt and crosses the border with Belgium and followed after is the Gemmenich climb to go into the Netherlands again. The Belgian climb part (or descent) is called Côte des Trois bornes or Côte des Trois Frontières and includes two hairpin bends. It starts from Gemmenich with the roadname Route des Trois Bornes.

== See also ==
- List of highest points in the Netherlands
- List of mountains and hills in North Rhine-Westphalia
