= Ladder Bay (Saba) =

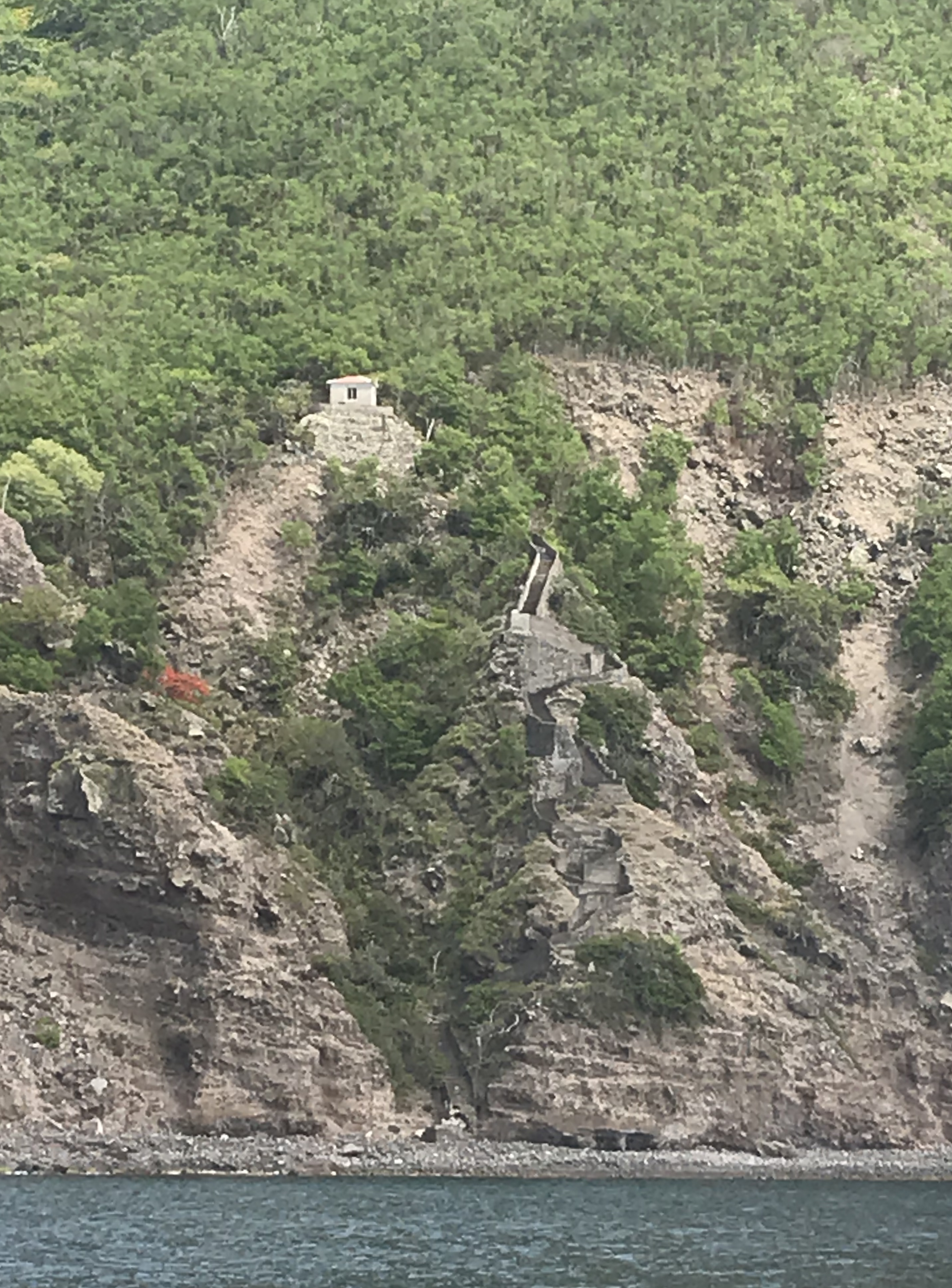
- Ladder Bay, with "The Ladder" and the old customs house above

- Location on Saba
- Location: Saba National Marine Park, Saba
- Coordinates: 17°38′2″N 63°15′21″W
- Type: Bay
- Primary inflows: Caribbean Sea
- Max. depth: 80 ft (24 m)
- Settlements: The Bottom

Ladder Bay is an anchorage on the leeward side of the Caribbean island of Saba. The bay sits on the west side of the island, directly under a set of 800 steps hand carved into the rocks locally known as "The Ladder". Until the construction of Saba's first pier in the 1970s, Ladder Bay was a primary point of entry for supplies to the island. An abandoned customs house sits on the lip of a cliff overlooking the bay.

== History ==
Before European colonization, the area above Ladder Bay may have been occupied by Amerindians during the Ceramic Era. Archeologists have not yet found evidence of an Amerindian settlement above Ladder Bay, but they have found ceramic artifacts in the area.

Saba was settled by Europeans in the mid-17th century. There is long-standing documentation of early European settlements near Tent Bay, Fort Bay, and above Well's Bay. But more recently, archeologists have found 17th-century ceramics above Ladder Bay, suggesting the area may have been occupied during early years of European settlement.

From the 1650s until the 1970s, the two primary ports of entry for Saba were at Ladder Bay and Fort Bay. Boats could offload cargo at Ladder Bay, which would then be transported up "The Ladder", a series of steps carved into the ridge above Ladder Bay. The cargo would then be transported to Saba's capital, The Bottom, via a footpath through an area known as The Gap.

Both cargo and people were brought onto Saba via The Ladder. Even large items were transported up The Ladder, one of the most famous being a piano.

In the 1930s, The Ladder in its current form, as well as the Customs House, were constructed. The steps of The Ladder were made of poured concrete, and the staircase walls from a mixture of concrete and rock.

In the 1970s, the Capt. Chance Leo Pier was constructed at Fort Bay. With a harbor at Fort Bay, the use of Ladder Bay as a port fell out of use. In 2017, the bottom 2 meters (6.5 ft) of The Ladder were severely damaged by Hurricane Maria.

Today, "The Ladder" is an iconic Saban monument and popular hiking location, and Ladder Bay is an official mooring area and the site of multiple popular dive sites.

== Hiking ==
The Ladder (Trail): The trailhead is located between The Bottom and Well's Bay. The trail goes past the old customs house, and descends all 800 steps of The Ladder, before coming back up. The strenuous hike takes about 1 hour round trip. The dry forest portion of the trail includes diverse trees, including mahogany trees (e.g. Swietenia mahagoni) and cinnamon trees (Pimenta racemosa).

Middle Island Trail: The trail begins close to The Ladder trail, and has views of Well's Bay and Ladder Bay. It is a heritage trail that includes ruins of an open cistern, stone walls of a farm, and a cavern. The hike takes about 40 minutes one-way.

== Diving ==
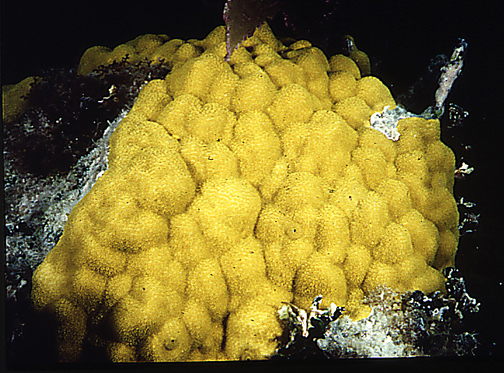
Mustardhill Coral (Porites astreoides)

Ladder Bay is the location of multiple dive sites for scuba divers.

- Porites Point, named for the quantity of Porites coral at the locating, including Mustardhill Coral (Porites astreoides) and Branching Finger Coral (Porites furcata).
- Babylon, a site with dramatic overhangs (possibly reminiscent of the Hanging Gardens of Babylon) home to sea fans, as well as a site for seeing sharks, turtles, eels, and fish.
- Ladder Labyrinth, named for the labyrinth of tall, 10-foot coral and rock ridges that are for shrimp, crabs, and lobsters.
- 50/50, named for divers' choice of multiple areas to explore, including underwater lava formations, a shallow reef area, and a rubble field.

At Babylon, Ladder Labyrinth, and 50/50, divers can place their hands on hot, sulfur-colored sand, resulting from the active status of Saba's volcano.

== Marine life ==
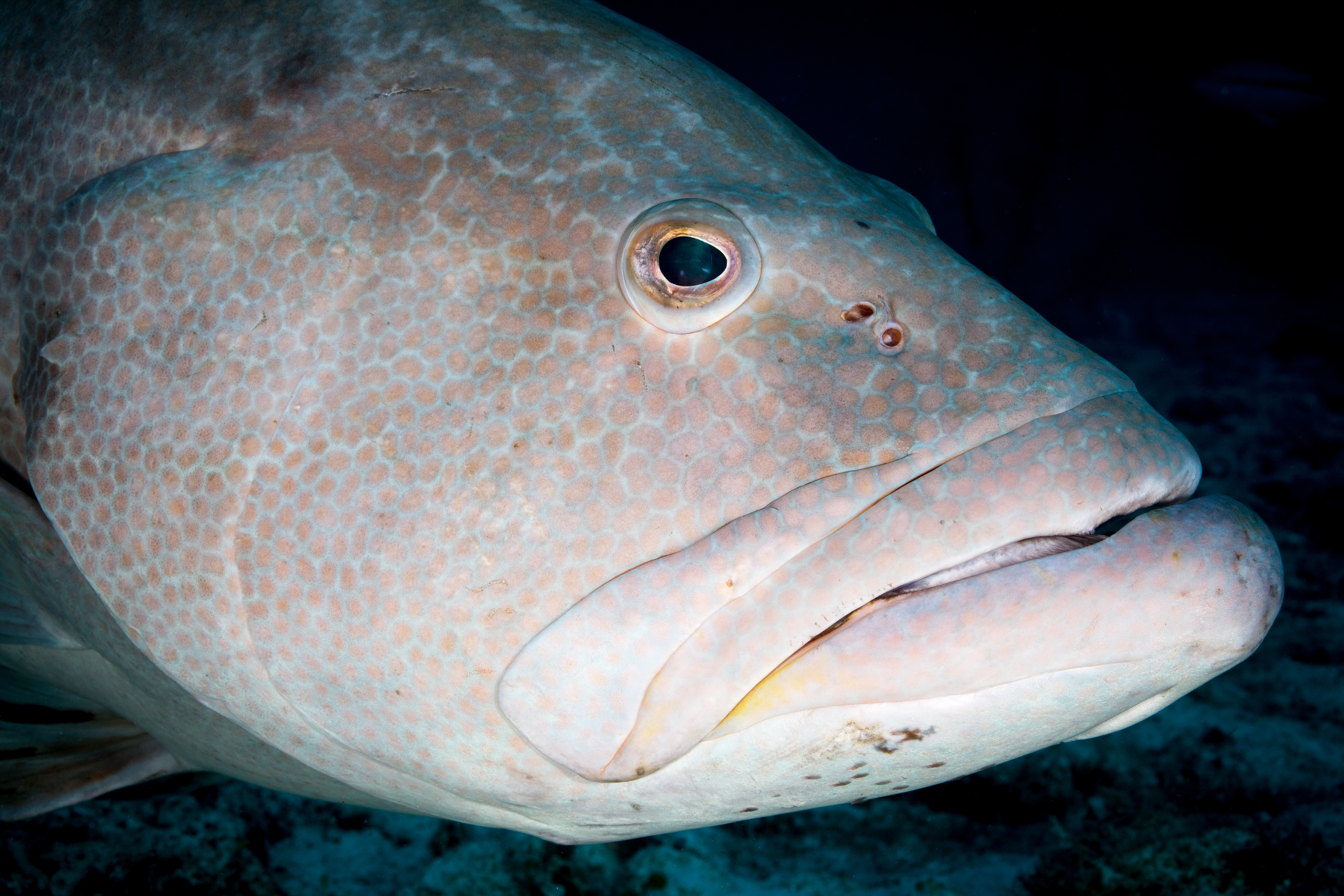
Yellowfin grouper (Mycteroperca venenosa)

The bay is home to a variety of fish, including Burrfish, Chromis, Filefish, Glassy Sweepers, Horse-eye Jacks, Lancer Dragonets, Lizardfish, Peacock Flounders, Pikeblennies, Schoolmasters, Spotted Drums, Tarpons, Yellowfin Groupers, and Yellowhead Jawfish, as well as Nurse Sharks and Reef sharks.

Other marine life in Ladder Bay includes Channel Clinging Crabs, Green Turtles, Hawksbill Turtles, Spotted Moray Eels, Squat Lobster, and Tigertail Sea Cucumber.

Ladder Bay's reefs include a variety of coral. The most common are Star coral (Astreopora), Brain coral, and Gorgonian (Alcyonacea) coral, as well as Porites coral at the Porites Point dive site. The bay is also home to sea fans such as Deepwater Seafans.

== Moorings ==
Saba has two designated anchorage zones within the Saba National Marine Park: one between Ladder Bay and Wells Bay (west coast), and one in front of Fort Bay (southern coast). Between Ladder Bay and Wells Bay, the Saba National Marine Park manages about half a dozen moorings that are in about 60 feet (18 m) of water. The use of mooring buoys can help eliminator anchor damage to coral reefs.

Passengers of moored boats are advised to enter the island via through Fort Bay Harbor for safety reasons. Additionally, passengers from arriving yachts are required to go to Fort Bay to clear Customs and Immigration, as well as to check in and out with the Saba's Harbor Master.

In March 2017, a French-owned boat broke free of its mooring, and became stranded on the rocks in Ladder Bay. No one was aboard, and the boat was successfully salvaged a few days later. That same year another vessel ran aground at Ladder Bay; all passengers were unharmed.

== See also ==
- Fort Bay
- The Bottom
