= Kasabian (disambiguation) =

Kasabian is an English rock band.

Kasabian or Kassabian may also refer to:

- Kasabian (album), by Kasabian, 2004
- Linda Kasabian (1949–2023), "Manson Family" cult member and key witness in the 1970 Tate-LaBianca murder trial
- Mihran Kassabian (1870–1910), Armenian-American radiologist
- Rita Kassabian, Lebanese-Armenian composer

== See also ==
- Kasab (disambiguation)
- Kassab (disambiguation)
