= Kasap =

Kasap may refer to:

- Buloh Kasap, neighbourhood in Johor, Malaysia
  - Buloh Kasap Bridge
- Kasap Dasht Kuh, village in Sistan and Baluchestan, Iran
- Kasap (surname)

== See also ==
- Kasab (disambiguation)
