= Kasai =

Kasai or Kasaï may refer to:

== Places ==
=== Congo ===
- Congo-Kasaï, one of the four large provinces of Belgian Congo
- Kasaï District, in the Kasai-Occidental province of the Democratic Republic of the Congo
- Kasai Province, one of the provinces of the Congo
- Kasaï region in the center of Congo

=== Japan ===
- Kasai District, Hokkaido, a district of Hokkaido Prefecture, Japan
- Kasai Rinkai Park, in Edogawa, Tokyo
- Kasai Station, in the Kasai section of Edogawa, Tokyo, Japan
- Kasai, Hyōgo is a city in Hyōgo Prefecture, Japan

== Other uses ==
- Kangsabati River, or Kasai River in India
- Kasai procedure, a pediatric surgery commonly for biliary atresia
- Kasai (surname), a Japanese surname

=== Congo ===
- Air Kasaï, an airline in Barumbu, Kinshasa, Congo
- Compagnie du Kasai, a concession company of the Congo
- Kasai Allstars, a 25-piece musical collective based in Kinshasa, Congo
- Kasai River disaster, a passenger ferry capsized in Congo
- Kasai River, in Angola and the Congo

== See also ==
- Kassai (disambiguation)
- Kasab (disambiguation)
- Qasab (disambiguation)
- Qassab, a Muslim ethnic group in north India and Pakistan
