= Well's Bay =

Coastal bay in Saba, Caribbean Netherlands

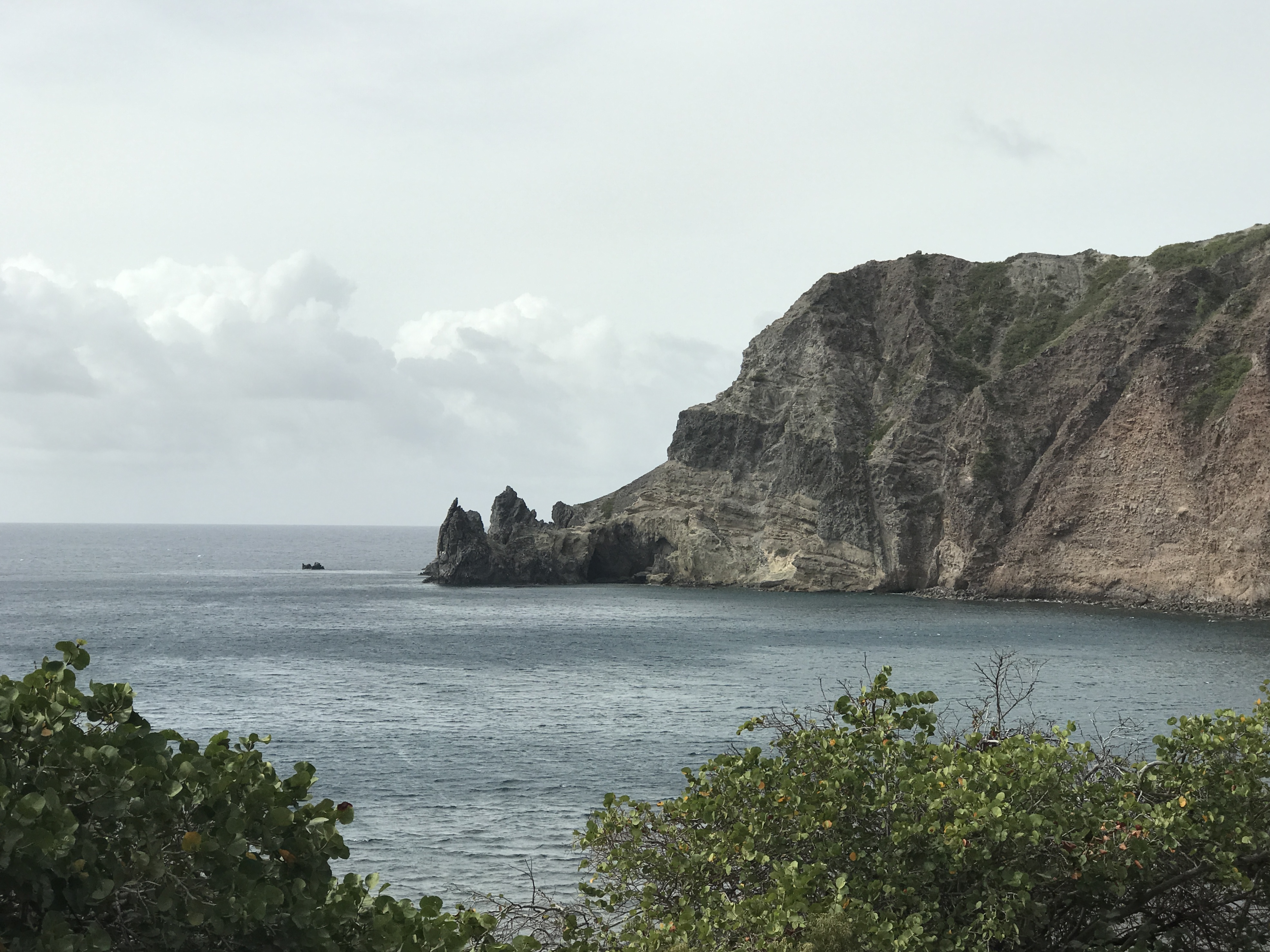
- Well's Bay, with Torrens Point in the distance

- Location on Saba
- Location: Saba National Marine Park, Saba
- Coordinates: 17°38′28″N 63°15′10″W
- Type: Bay
- Primary inflows: Caribbean Sea
- Max. depth: 50 ft (15 m)
- Settlements: Mary's Point (abandoned), Middle Island (abandoned), The Bottom

Well's Bay (also Wells Bay, The Well's Bay; previously The Well Bay) is a coastal bay on the island of Saba in the Dutch Caribbean. It is located on the northwestern coast of the island. The bay is one of a few places for swimming on Saba. Sometimes Well's Bay has a small beach, known locally as the “wandering beach” due to the black sand that appears and disappears seasonally and sporadically.

The bay is part of Saba National Marine Park and is popular snorkeling location due to the proximity to coral reefs. At the northernmost end of Well's Bay, Torrens Point is a popular dive site for scuba divers and snorkelers.

== History ==
In the 17th century, Saba's first European settlements, Palmetto Point (Mary's Point) and Middle Island, were built on the cliffs overlooking Well's Bay. This location provided for easy defense, and the bay below provided an area for anchoring boats as well as fishing.

In the mid-17th century, these early settlers dug a freshwater well at the bay below. This is the origin of the bay's current name, Well's Bay. The well at Well's Bay was used by residents into the mid-19th century. The well's water quality was low and variable, and depended on the weather; so inhabitants relied on rainwater caught in cisterns. The well at Well's Bay is one of four historic wells built on Saba, with the others located at Middle Island, Core Gut Bay, and Cove Bay.

During the 18th and 19th centuries, Saba was internationally known for illicit trade and piracy. As Saba's western coast provided coverage from other islands, many ships were abandoned at Well's Bay as part of privateering schemes.

Boat building is a part of Saba's history. Boats were built by hand at Well's Bay and Tent Bay, weighing as much as 60 gross tons. Before Saba had docking facilities, visitors were sometimes rowed in through Well's Bay.

== The "wandering beach" ==
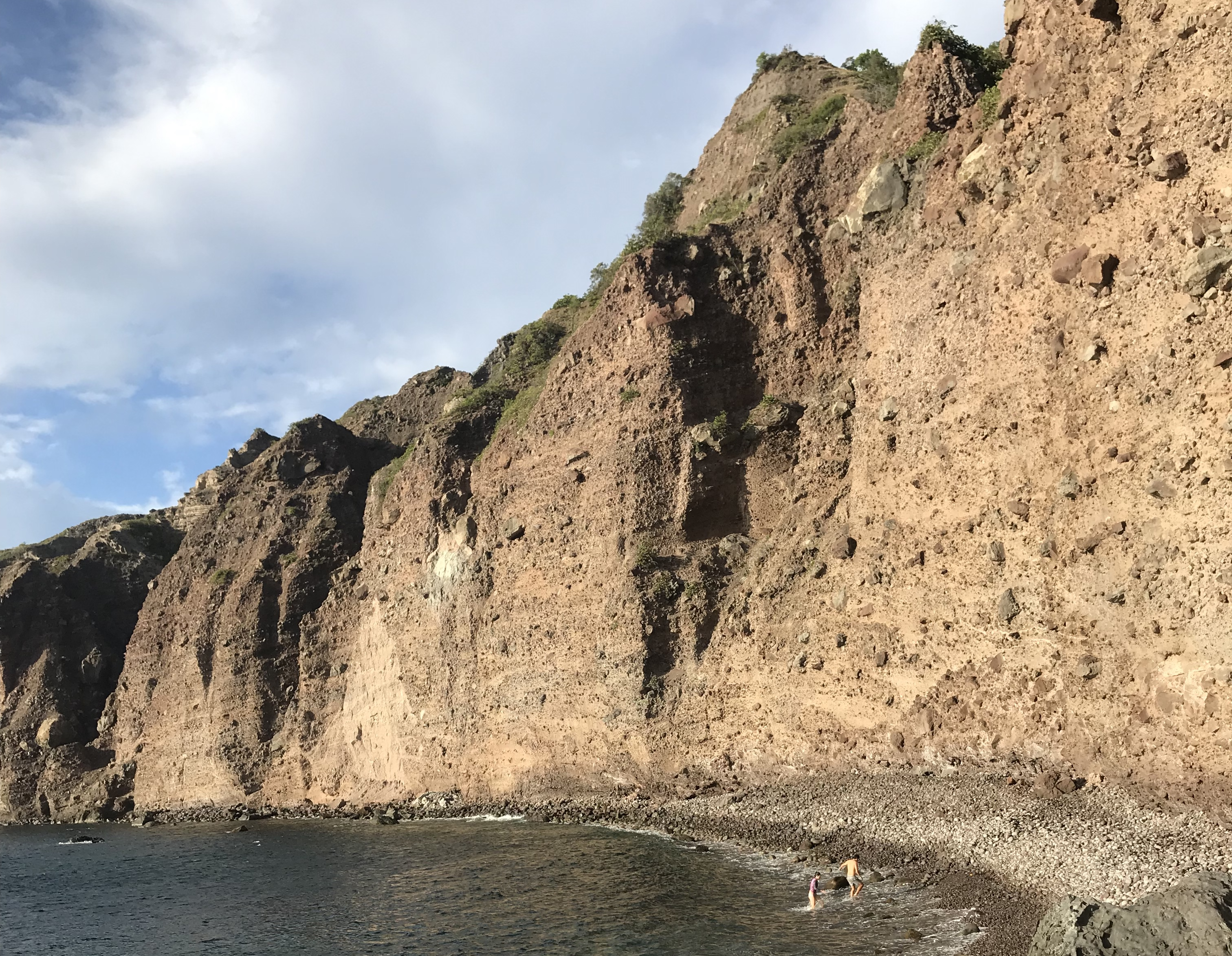
Swimmers emerging from Well's Bay onto the cobble beach

At times, Well's Bay has a small beach, known locally as the “wandering beach”. Black sand appears and disappears depending on northerly swells and seasonality. The beach usually appears March through October. Sometimes the beach disappears for multiple years. When the sand is absent, the Well's Bay beach is a cobble beach.

== Wildlife ==
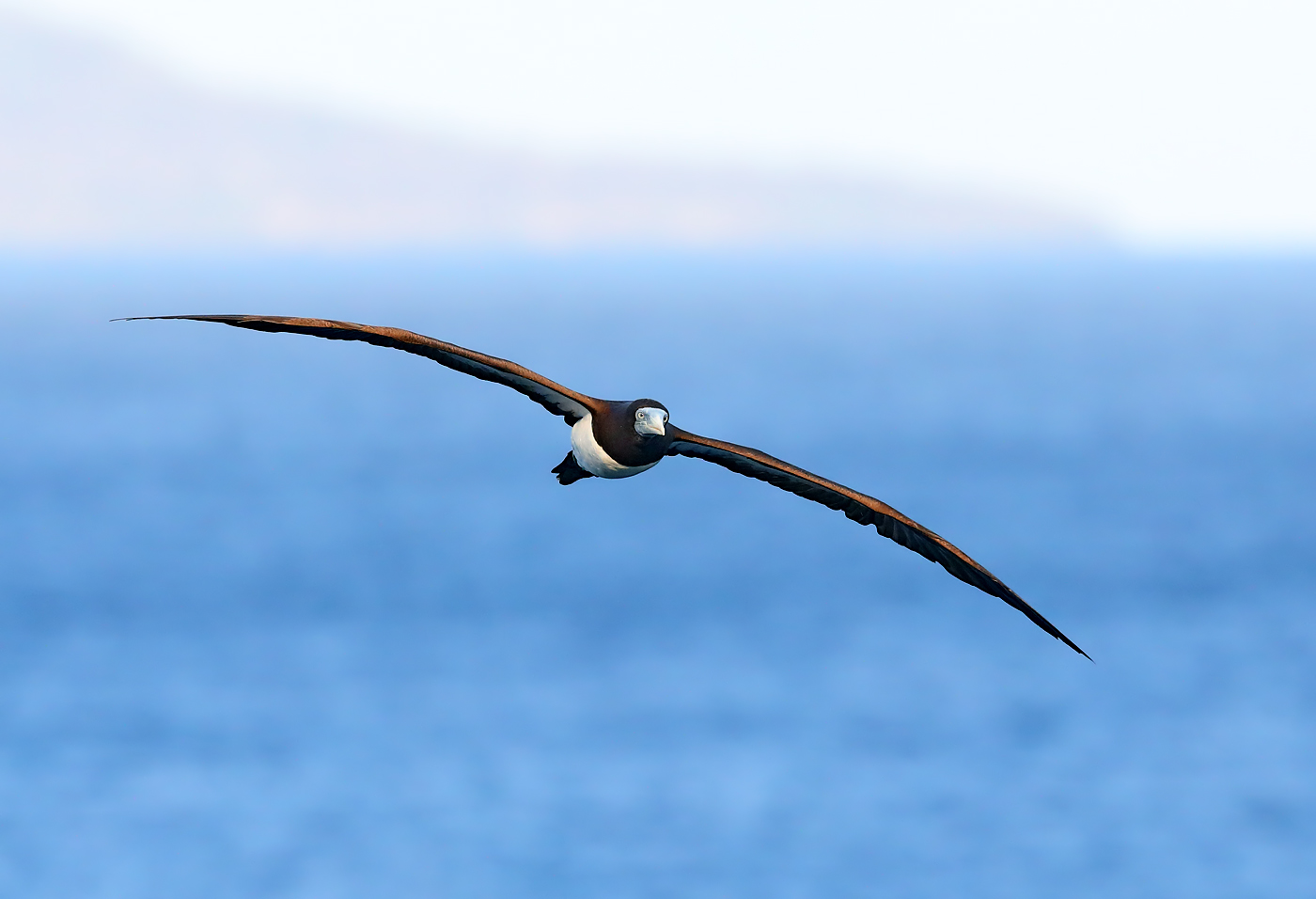
Photo of a Brown Booby

Many seabirds can be seen at Well's Bay, including, the Brown Booby (Sula leucogaster), the Frigatebird (Fregata magnificens), and the Pearly-eyed Thrasher Thrush (Margarops fuscatus fuscatus). The Scaly-breasted Thrasher has been seen between Well's Bay and The Bottom.

Reptiles at Well's Bay include the Saba anole (Anolis sabanus) and the Green iguana (Iguana iguana). In the past, Well's Bay has been a nesting site for sea turtles, specifically the Green sea turtle (Chelonia midas).

Diverse marine life is found in the waters of Well's Bay and around Torrens Point and Diamond Rock. Specific examples include: Blue tang (Acanthurus coeruleus), Goatfish (Mullidae family), Parrotfish (Scaridae family), Great Barracudas (Sphyraena barracuda), Nurse sharks (Ginglymostomatidae), Caribbean reef sharks (Carcharhinus perezi), Morays eels (Muraenidae family).

== Hiking ==
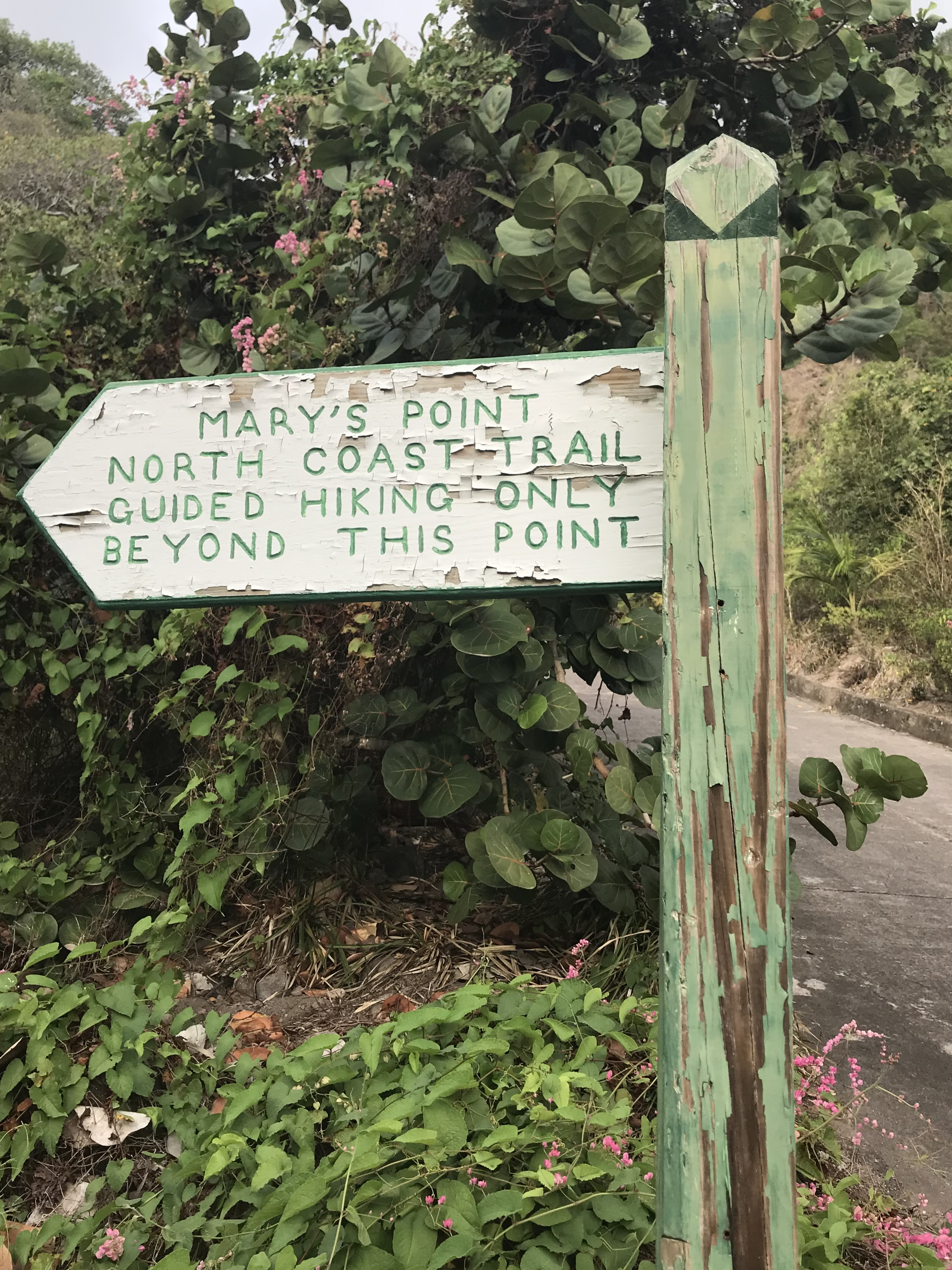
Trailhead sign for Mary’s Point and North Coast Trail

Multiple trailheads are located at Well's Bay and/or with views of Well's Bay:

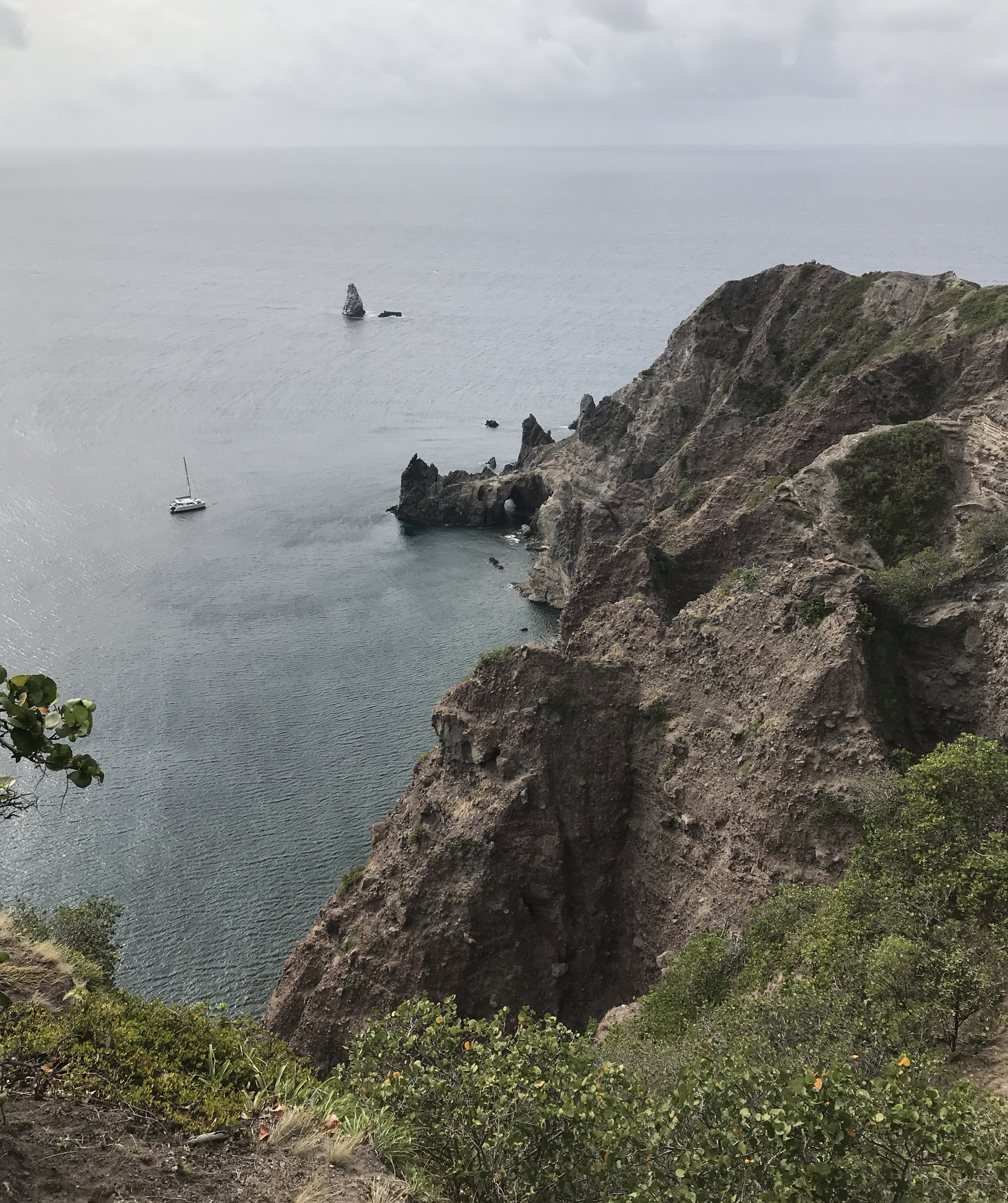
View of Well's Bay, Saba, from Mary’s Point Trail

- Mary's Point Trail (1 hour one-way) can be accessed from the Well's Bay Road. This hike goes up the cliffs that overlook Well's Bay. It is a heritage trail that features the ruins of the 17th-century settlement of Mary's Point (Palmetto Point), Saba's first European settlement.
- North Coast Trail (3.5 hours one-way)can be accessed from the Well's Bay Road (or Lower Hell's Gate). The trail is currently closed to regular hikers due to strenuousness and environmental dangers.
- The Ladder trail (30 minutes one-way) begins between The Bottom and Well's Bay. The Ladder's 800 steps that were historically used to bring cargo ashore and up to The Bottom.
- Middle Island Trail (40 minutes one-way) starts close to the Ladder trail. It is a heritage trail that includes ruins of an open cistern, stone walls of a farm, and a cavern. The trail has views of Well's Bay and Ladder Bay.

== Access ==
Well's Bay is accessible by car via Well's Bay Road. This paved road leads down to the bay from The Bottom, Saba's capital. The steep road is one of the branches of "The Road", the island's primary road. Divers and snorkelers can also get to Well's Bay, Torrens Point, and Diamond Rock via boat. Well's Bay is not used as a harbour; Saba's harbour is located at Fort Bay.

== Gallery ==
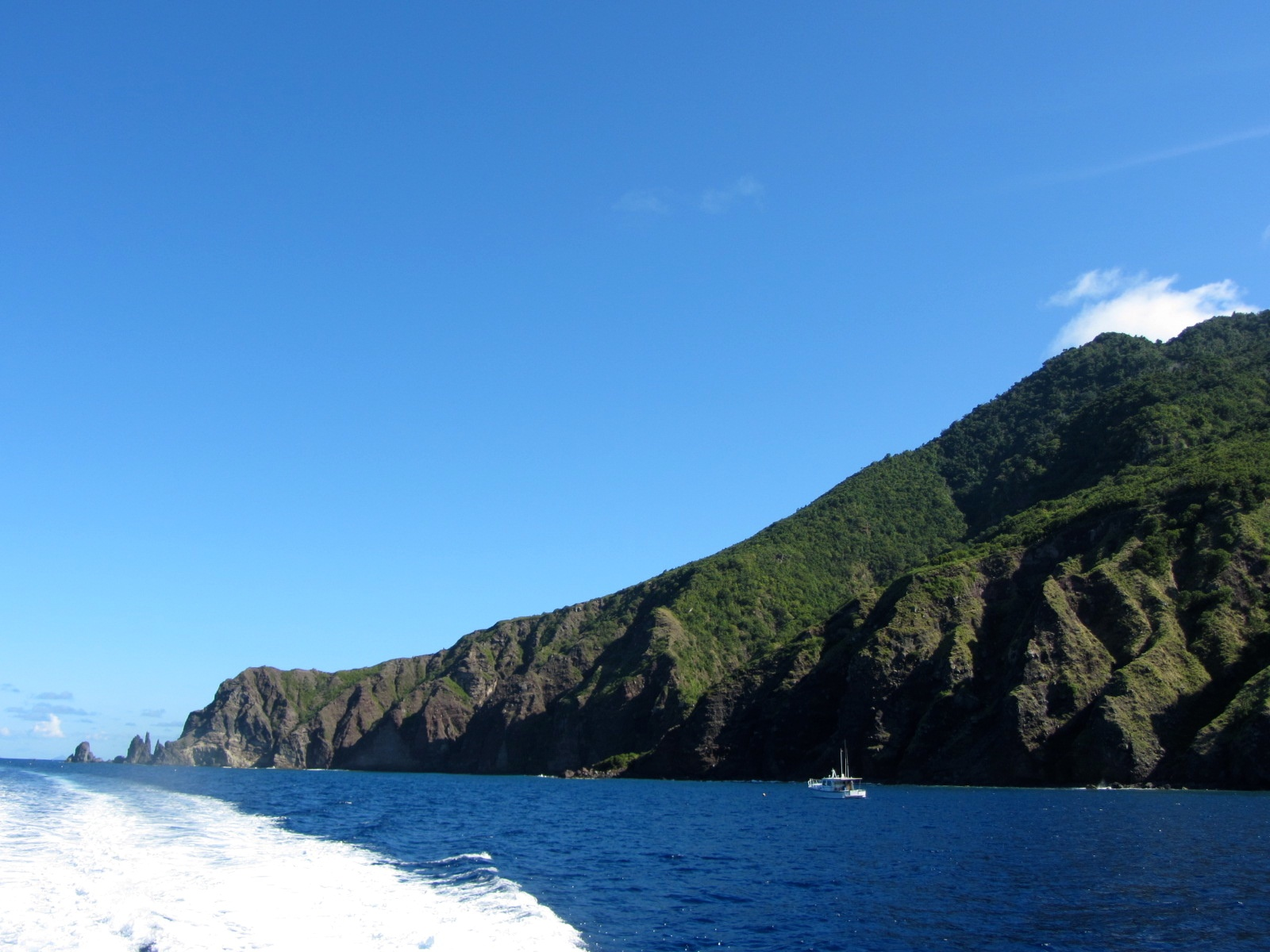
View of Well's Bay from boat

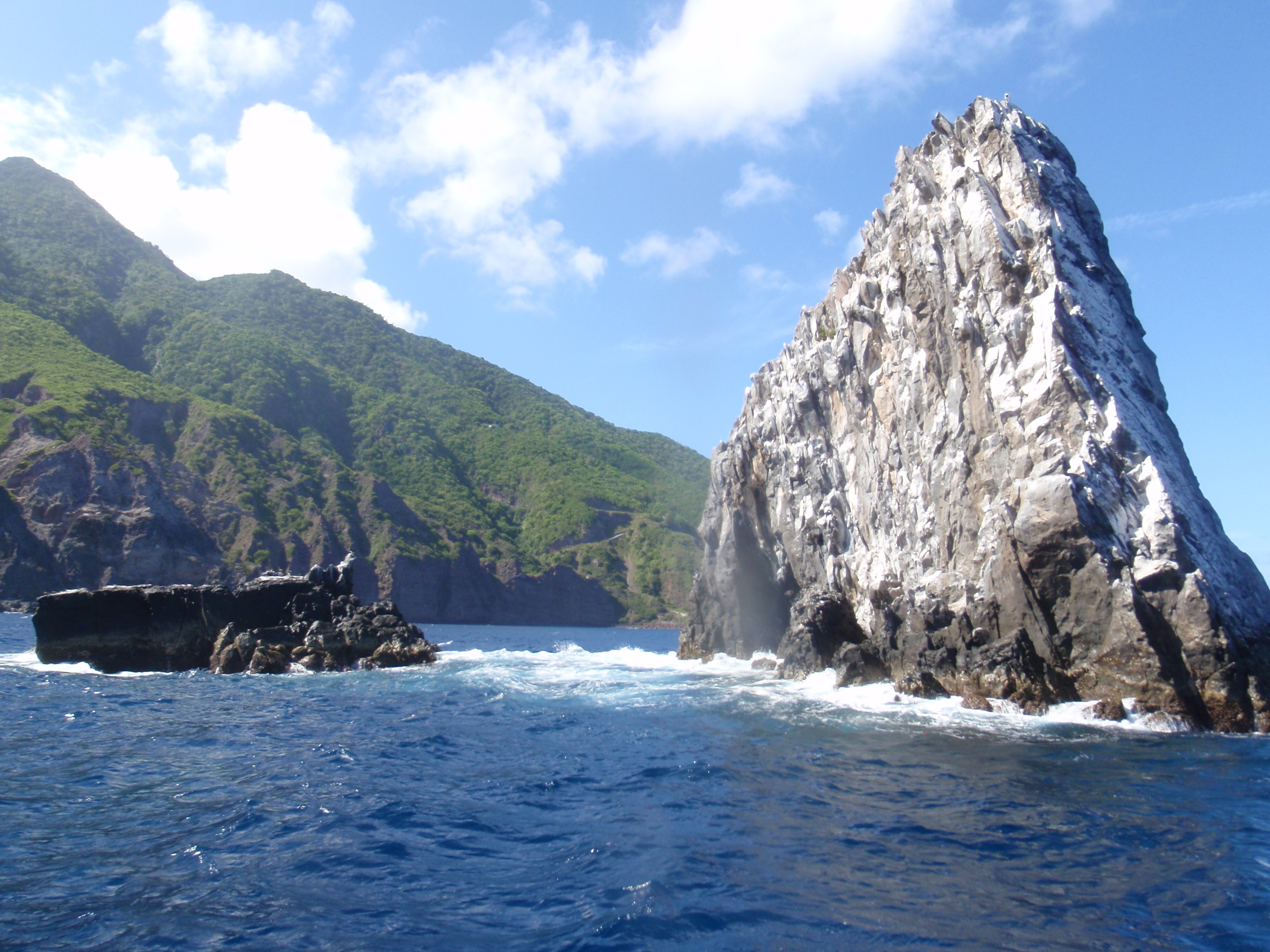
Diamond Rock, with Well's Bay behind it

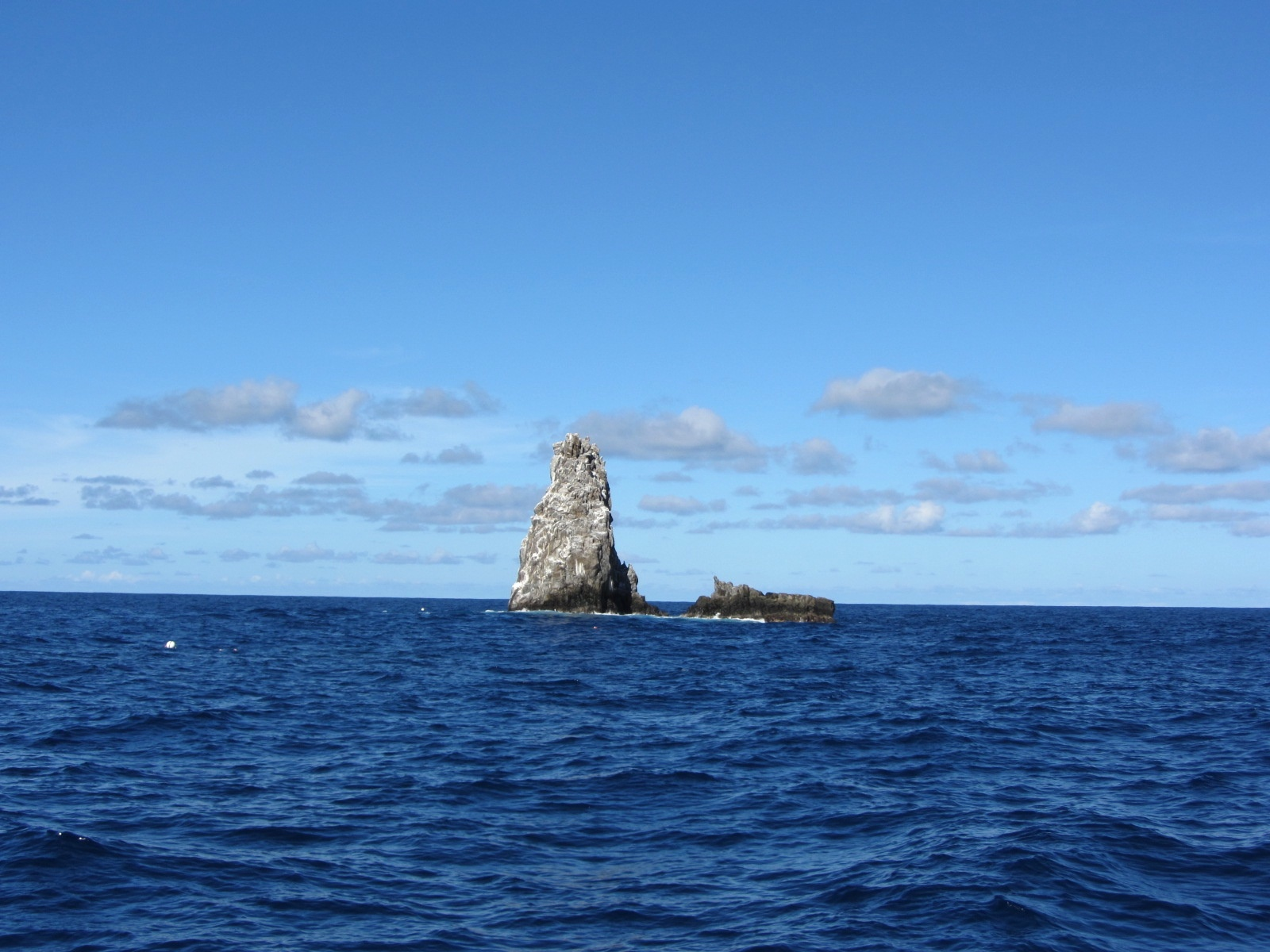
Diamond Rock, just outside of Well's Bay

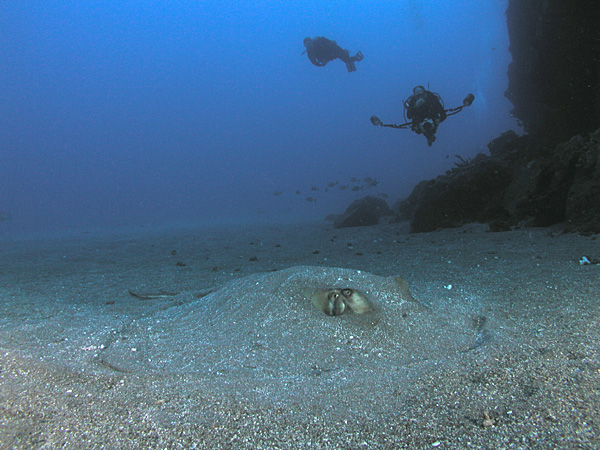
Underwater photo by Diamond Rock

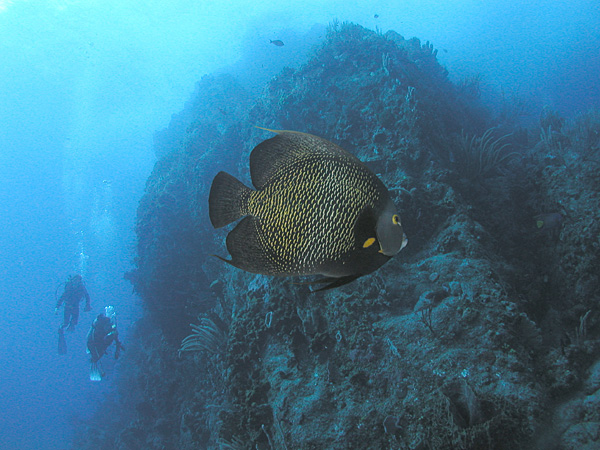

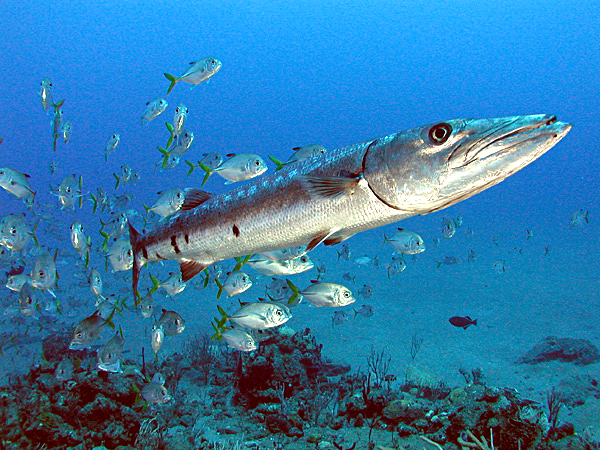
Great Barracuda (Sphyraena barracuda) and Jacks, off of Diamond Rock dive site

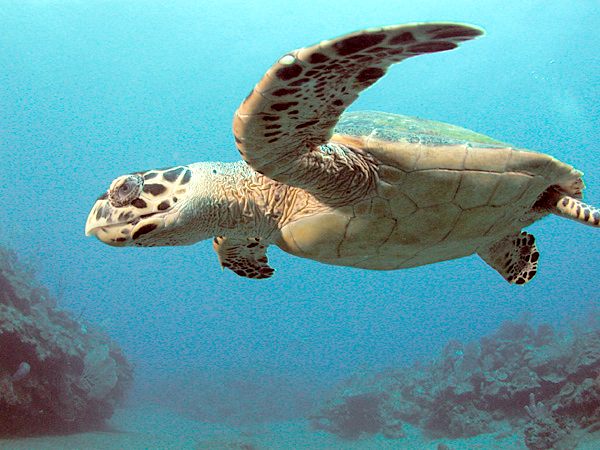
Sea turtle seen off the coast of Saba
