= Kassai =

Kassai may refer to:

- Kassai (surname)
- Kassai (song), by Kanjani Eight
- Kassai and Luk, French children's television series
- Apostolic Prefecture of Upper Kassai, mission territory in Central Africa

== See also ==
- Kasai (disambiguation)
- Kessai Note, president of the Marshall Islands
- Qassab, a Muslim ethnic group in north India and Pakistan
