= Kassab =

Kassab is a surname, a variant of Qasab. Other variants of the name are Cassab and Casap (especially in Latin America). Notable people with the surname include:

- Alejandro Hagano Cassab aka Gran Sandy (1937–2005), Bolivian-Argentine comedian and entertainer
- Barbara Kassab-Every (1945−2013), Dutch artist
- Freddy Kassab, involved in the Fatal Vision controversy
- Jibrail Kassab (born 1938), bishop of the Chaldean Catholic Church in Australia
- Gilberto Kassab (born 1960), Brazilian politician, mayor of São Paulo
- May Kassab (born 1981), Egyptian singer
- Nimatullah Kassab (1808−1858), Lebanese monk, scholar and saint
- Théophile Georges Kassab (1945−2013), Syrian Syriac Catholic archbishop
- Yumna Kassab, Australian novelist

== See also ==
- Kessab, or Kassab, a town in Syria
- Kasab (disambiguation)
- Qasab (disambiguation)
