= Qasab =

Qasab may refer to:

- Qasab (surname)
- Qasab, Iran
- Burj al-Qasab, Syria
- Qasab-e Amir, Iran
- Qasab-e Zalkan, Iran
- Tal Qasab, Iraq

== See also ==
- Qassab, members of the Muslim community or biradari involved in the meat business
- Kasab (disambiguation)
- Kassab (disambiguation)
