= Kassai (surname) =

Kassai is a Hungarian, Arabic, Iraqi, Syrian and Jewish surname. Notable people with the surname include:

- Ervin Kassai (1925–2012), Hungarian basketball referee
- Fernander Kassaï (born 1987), Central African footballer
- Hassan Kassai (1928–2012), Iranian classical musician
- Ilona Kassai (1928-2025), Hungarian actress
- István Kassai (born 1959), Hungarian pianist
- Lajos Kassai (born 1960), Hungarian archer
- Viktor Kassai (born 1975), Hungarian football referee

== See also ==
- Kasai (surname)
