= Barbara Kassab-Every =

Dutch painter from Saba

- Born: 1945; Saba
- Died: 2016 (aged 70–71); Saint Kitts and Nevis
- Known for: oil paintings

Barbara Kassab-Every was a Dutch painter born on the Caribbean island of Saba, who lived in St. Kitts.

== Biography ==
Barbara Kassab was born in 1945 on the island of Saba in the Netherlands Antilles. Beginning at a young age, Kassab started painting landscapes of her home of Saba, including portrayals of the hills and iconic winding roads of the island. One of these pictures depicting an s-shaped road was presented to the Queen of the Netherlands on one of her visits to the Netherlands Antilles.

Kassab had one brother, Floyd Every. After moving to St. Kitts, she married Bichara Kassab and had two children: Brian and Sandra. She had an art studio in her home in the Fortlands.

== Works ==
Barbara Kassab's works have been exhibited in Canada, Guyana, Barbados, St. Kitts, Curaçao, and other Caribbean islands. Her paintings include:

- Iveora Flower
- Landing at Fort Bay, Olden Days (Saba)
- Road to Mount Scenery (Saba)
- Golden Profiles
- Local House (Saba)

In 2009, one of Kassab's acrylic landscape paintings was given as a gift to a member of the United States of America's Federal Reserve Board.
