= Saba Conservation Foundation =

Non-governmental organisation

- Abbreviation: SCF
- Formation: 1987; 39 years ago
- Type: NGO
- Purpose: Conservation of natural and cultural heritage of Saba
- Headquarters: Fort Bay, Saba, Kingdom of the Netherlands
- Location(s): Saba Trail and Information Centre, Windwardside
- Official language: English
- Board of directors: 3 members (2023)
- Affiliations: Dutch Caribbean Nature Alliance
- Staff: 10 (2023)
- Website: www.sabapark.org

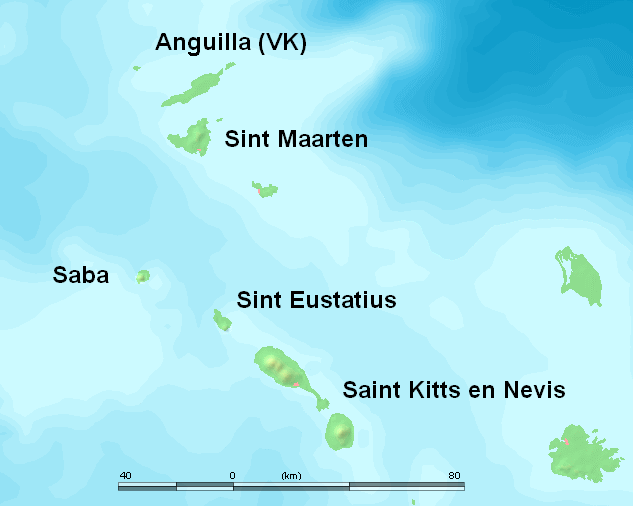
A map showing Saba on the left and a number of the other Leeward Islands

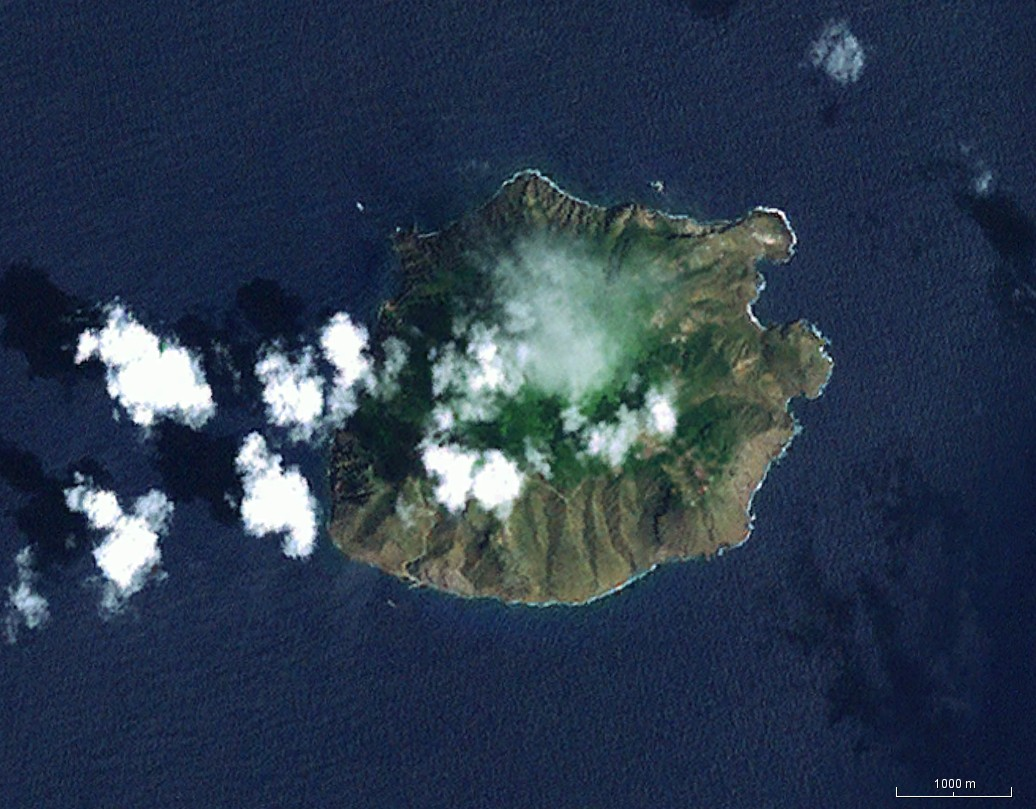
A satellite view of Saba includes the surrounding sea area, some of which is the Marine Park. The harbor at Fort Bay is visible at the lower left; Flat Point (where the airport is situated) is visible at the upper right.

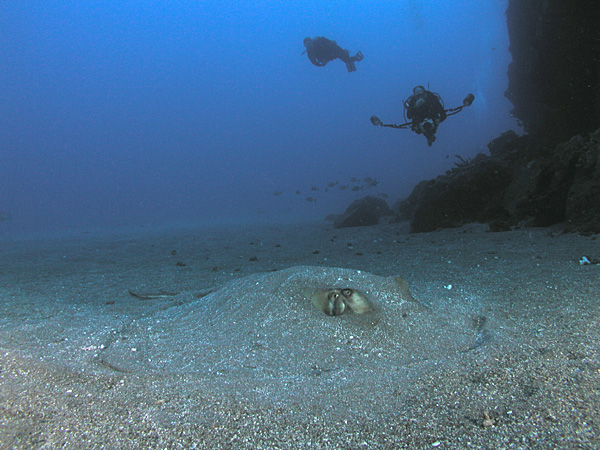
Within the Saba Marine Park: divers and a southern stingray

The Saba Conservation Foundation (SCF) is a non-governmental organization that is concerned with the conservation of the natural and cultural heritage of the small Caribbean island of Saba, which is a part of the Kingdom of the Netherlands. Saba is part of the inner arc of the Leeward Islands chain of the Lesser Antilles.

The SCF was founded in 1987. Its mission is "to commit to the preservation and enhancement of the marine and terrestrial environment on Saba through education, scientific research, monitoring and enforcement." The SCF has seven employees, and a board with ten members. The Foundation forms part of the Dutch Caribbean Nature Alliance.

SCF is headquartered at Fort Bay (Saba's only harbor), with a second office at the Saba Trail and Information Centre in Windwardside.

== Managed areas ==
=== Marine areas ===
==== Saba National Marine Park ====
Completely surrounding the island of Saba is a National Marine Park, which extends from the high-water mark to a depth of 60 metres (200 ft). The SCF manages the marine park and also a hyperbaric facility for divers.

==== Saba Bank National Park ====
In 2010, the very large submerged atoll known as the Saba Bank, which lies southwest of the island of Saba, was designated as a Netherlands National Park. This atoll is the flat top of a seamount. The Saba Bank park is 2,679 square kilometres (1,034 sq mi) in size.

=== On land ===
==== Saba Walking Trail Network ====
The SCF is the management agency for the numerous hiking trails, which are known as the Saba Trail Network.

==== Land-based nature reserves ====
Legislation to support the official status of the 45 hectares (110 acres) "Saba National Land Park" was in process in 2012. An "Elfin Forest Reserve" near the top of Mount Scenery (the highest point on the island) is also a possibility.
