= Kasap (surname) =

Kasap is a surname, a Turkish-language variant of Qasab. Notable people with the surname include:

- Ali Fazıl Kasap, Turkish medical doctor, senator and academician
- Karolj Kasap, wrestler
- Mike Kasap, American football player
- Safa Kasap, Canadian engineer
- Teodor Kasap, Turkish name of Theodoros Kasapis (1835–1897), Ottoman Greek newspaper editor and educator
