= Qasab (surname) =

Qasab is a surname, a spelling variant of Kasab. Notable people with the surname include:

- Ajmal Kasab (1987–2012), also known as Ajmal Qasab, Lashkar-e-Taiba militant who was hanged for committing 2008 Mumbai terrorist attacks
- Musa Qasab, birth name of Moshe Katsav, Iranian-born president of Israel
