= Kasap Dasht Kuh =

Kasap Dasht Kuh كاسا پدشتكوه
- Village
- Country: Iran
- Province: Sistan and Baluchestan
- County: Khash
- Bakhsh: Irandegan
- Rural District: Kahnuk

Population (2006)
  - Total: 16
- Time zone: UTC+3:30 (IRST)
  - Summer (DST): UTC+4:30 (IRDT)

Kasap Dasht Kuh (Persian: كاسا پدشتكوه, also Romanized as Kāsāp Dasht Kūh) is a village in Kahnuk Rural District, Irandegan District, Khash County, Sistan and Baluchestan Province, Iran. At the 2006 census, its population was 16, in 4 families.
