= Rita Kassabian =

Armenian composer

- Born: Lebanon
- Origin: Armenian; living in France
- Genres: classical music, 21st-century music
- Occupations: Pianist, composer for orchestral, chamber and solo music works
- Instruments: Piano
- Years active: –present
- Website: www.ritakassabian.com

Rita Kassabian is an Armenian composer in Lebanon.

She was fascinated by the piano from an early age: from 1996 till 1997, she followed the advice of her mentor and internationally known late pianist Walid Akl who encouraged her to excel in music. She studied piano, harmony, and analysis, then was admitted to Schola Cantorum de Paris (France) in the composition/orchestration class of Patrice Sciortino in September 2001.

A maember of the French Société des auteurs, compositeurs et éditeurs de musique, she is also the chairwoman of the music associations ARKOncerts and A.R.K., which promote young talent.

== Awards ( Paris ) ==
2004

- Second prize in orchestration with honour

2005

- first prize in orchestration with honour
- prize of composition in chamber music with honour

2006

- prize of composition in solo instrument with honour

2007

- first prize in composition for chamber music
- first prize in composition for solo instrument
- first prize of composition for chorus
- first prize of composition for symphonic music

== Compositions ==
- April 2005

Impromptu for 2 flutes, cello, 4 timpani and 1 harp (composition prize 2005)

- December 2005

Divertimento for solo tenor saxophone, edited by L'Harmattan Editions – Paris (composition prize 2006)

- January 2006

Waltz for flute and strings

- January 2006

Evasions for solo contrabass

- May 2007

Trio for flute, tenor saxophone, and cello

- October 2008

Suite for strings (La Madeleine church Paris)

- October 2008

Concerto for flute, string orchestra, french horn, harp, timpani, and percussion (La Madeleine, Paris)

- March 2009

Fantasia for flute ensemble (Saint Germain des Prés Auditorium, Paris)

- December 2009

Concerto for tenor saxophone, oboe, strings, and percussion (Paris)

- May 2010

Concerto for tenor saxophone, saxophone band, and percussion (new version of the concerto created in December 2009 (Paris)
