= Kasab =

Kasab may refer to:

- Kasab or Kessab, a town in Syria
- Kasab, Iran, a village in Sistan and Baluchestan Province, Iran
- Qassab, a Muslim community of India and Pakistan
- Ajmal Kasab, a Pakistani militant who was involved in the 2008 Mumbai attacks; he was later executed by the Indian government
  - Kasab: The Face of 26/11, a 2010 non-fiction book about him by Indian journalist Rommel Rodrigues
- Khaled Kasab Mahameed, an Israeli Arab lawyer, founder of the Arab Institute for Holocaust Research and Education
- Khasab, a place in Oman

== See also ==
- Kassab (disambiguation)
- Qasab (disambiguation)
- Kasap (disambiguation)
- Kasai (disambiguation)
