= The Road (Saba) =

Primary road on Saba, Dutch Caribbean

- "The Road That Couldn't Be Built"
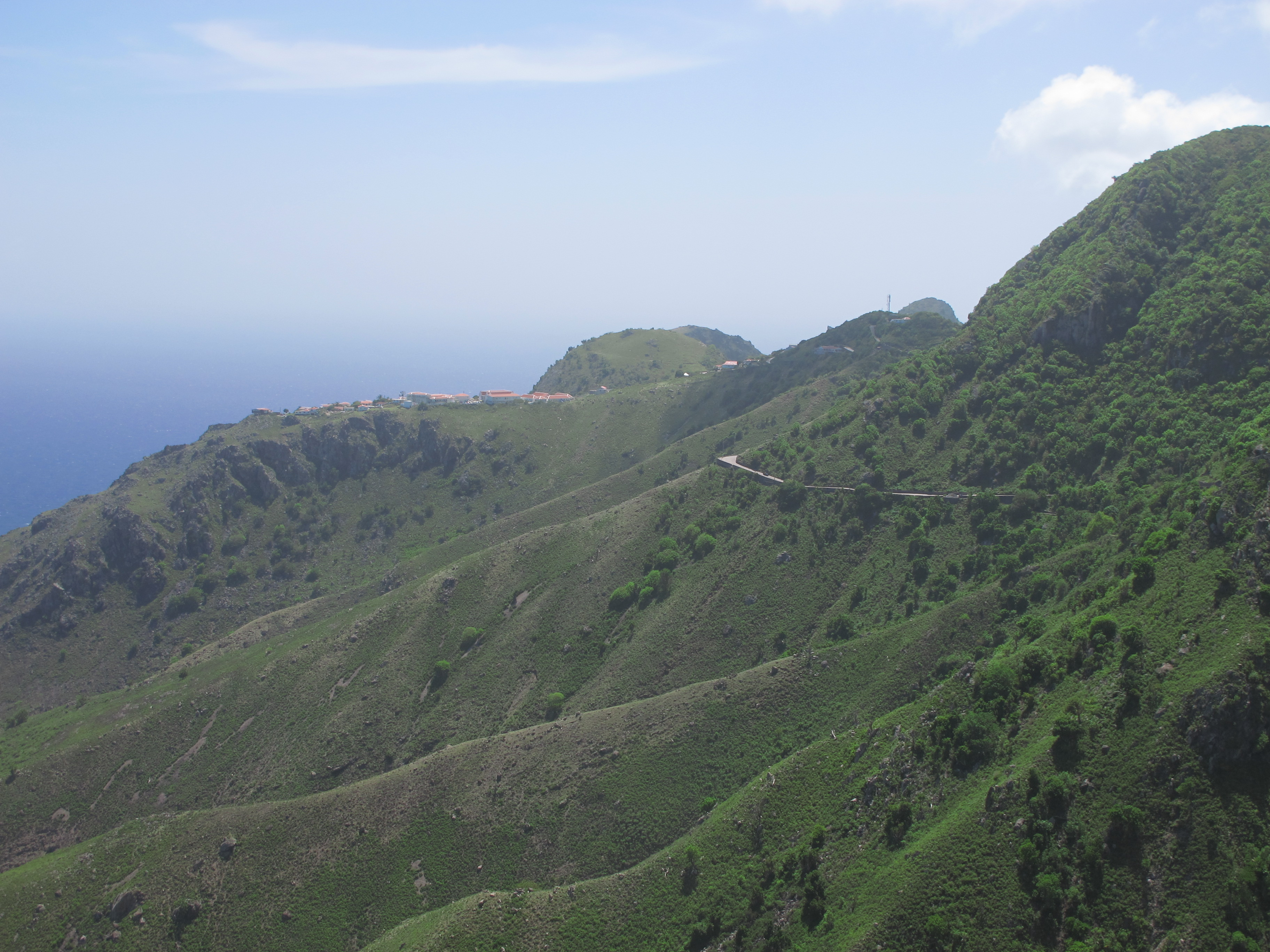
- Interactive map of The Road
- Length: 14 kilometres (8.7 mi)
- Location: Saba, Netherlands
- From: Well's Bay/ Fort Bay
- Major junctions: Well's Bay/Fort Bay junction, The Bottom, St. Johns, Windwardside, road to Mount Scenery hiking trail, Zion's Hill, road to sulfur mine, Juancho E. Yrausquin Airport roundabout
- To: Cove Bay

Construction
- Construction start: 1938
- Inauguration: 1943

The Road is the unofficial name for the cement road that connects the villages of Saba, Netherlands, a Caribbean island. It is nicknamed "The Road That Couldn't Be Built". It is the primary road on the island, spanning 8.7 miles (14.0 km). It was constructed by local Sabans between 1938 and 1963, without the use of machines.

== History ==
For most of its history Saba had no road, only footpaths and stone steps. Experts had expressed the opinion that it was impossible to build a cement road on the island. In the 1930s, a self-educated local engineer, Josephus Lambert "Lambee" Hassell (1906–1983), dedicated himself to the idea of creating a road.

Phase 1: In 1938, cementing of the road's first section began: from Fort Bay and The Bottom. Until then, this section had been a path made of 200 uneven stone steps. Construction was carried out by local Sabans under the leadership of Erroll Hassell. In 1943, this first section of the road was completed and inaugurated, it was 0.7 miles (1.1 km) long and 13 feet (4.0 m) wide, and covered an elevation change, or slope, of 653 feet (199 m).

Phase 2: By 1951, the road was extended to St. John's and then to Windwardside. This involved the removal of stone steps and cementing the paths.

Phase 3: In 1958, The Road was completed. Under the direction of Hassell, the road had been extended all the way to Hell's Gate, the village farthest from Fort Bay. In 1963, the road was extended to Saba's new airport at Flat Point. The Road covered 6.5 miles (10.5 km) from Fort Bay seaport to the airport at Flat Point.

Since then, branches have been added to the road, including branches to Well's Bay, to the Mount Scenery hiking trail, to the Sulphur Mine trail, and to Cove Bay. As of 2023, The Road was about 8.7 miles (14.0 km) long. An extension is planned for access to a new seaport under construction at Black Rocks since November 2025.

== Gallery ==
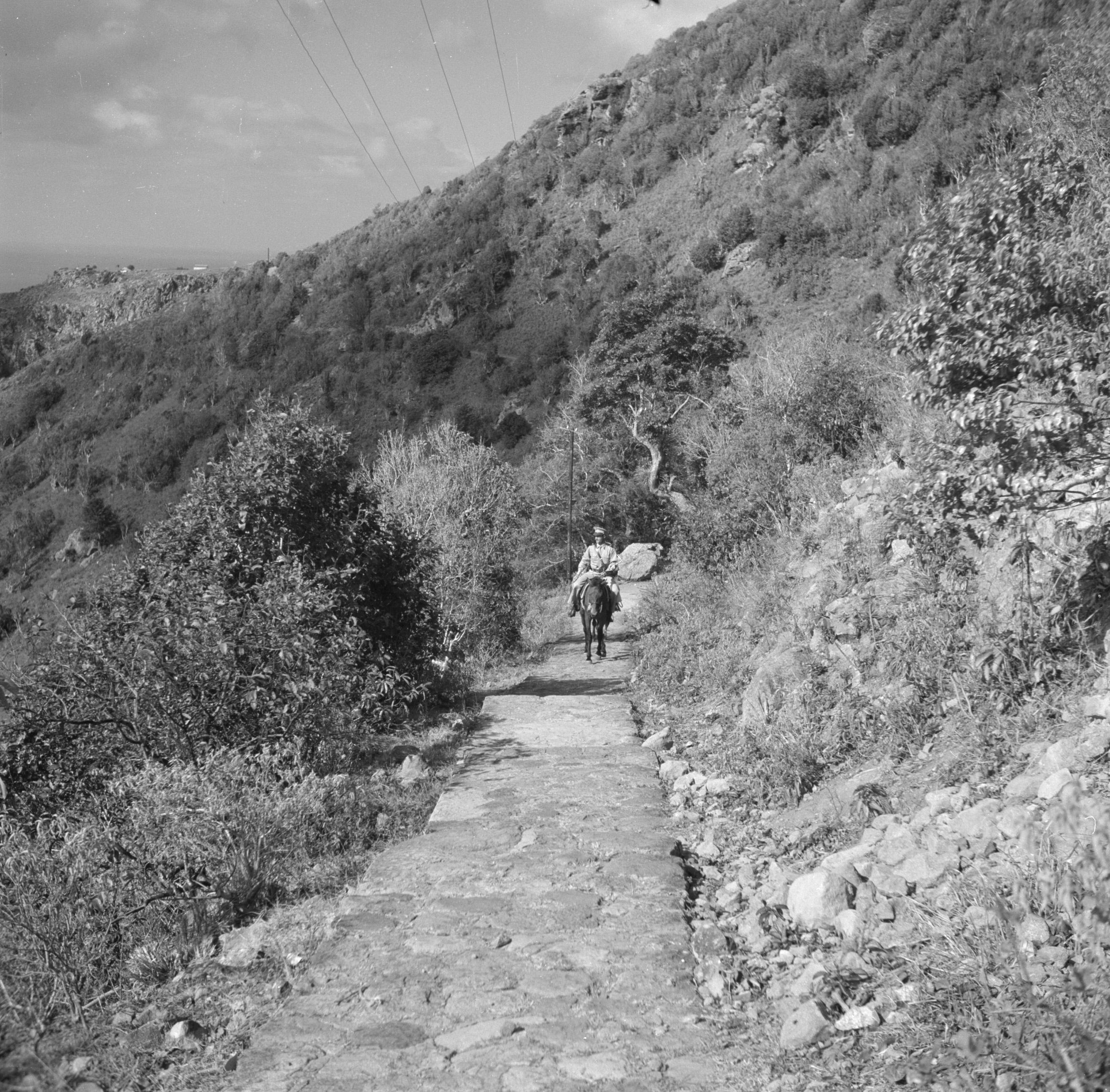
Example of stone footpath on Saba before construction of The Road

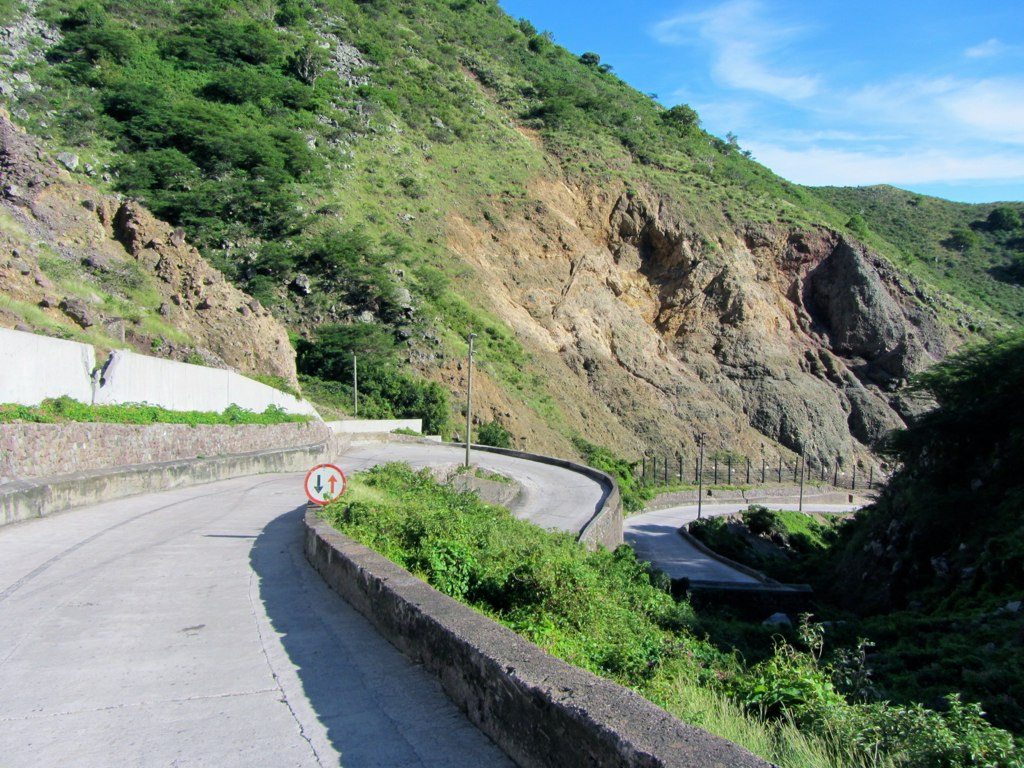
A portion of The Road between The Bottom and Fort Bay

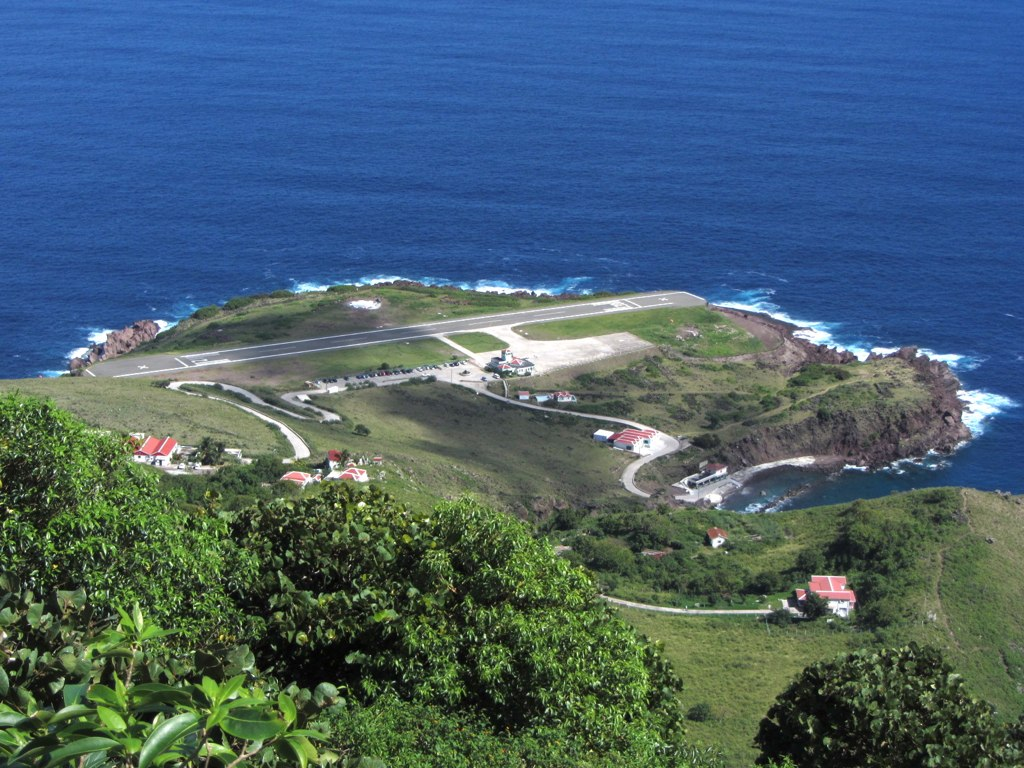
The Road going down to Saba's airport, and then down to Cove Bay
