= Qasab-e Amir =

Qasab-e Amir قصاب امير
- Village
- Country: Iran
- Province: Mazandaran
- County: Babol
- Bakhsh: Central
- Rural District: Esbu Kola

Population (2006)
  - Total: 214
- Time zone: UTC+3:30 (IRST)
  - Summer (DST): UTC+4:30 (IRDT)

Qasab-e Amir (Persian: قصاب امير, also Romanized as Qaşāb-e Amīr) is a village in Esbu Kola Rural District, in the Central District of Babol County, Mazandaran Province, Iran. At the 2006 census, its population was 214, in 57 families.
