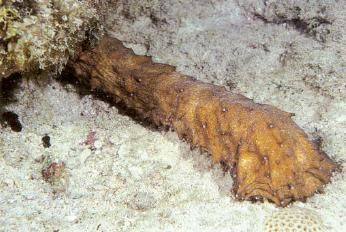

Conservation status
- Least Concern (IUCN 3.1)

Scientific classification
- Kingdom: Animalia
- Phylum: Echinodermata
- Class: Holothuroidea
- Order: Holothuriida
- Family: Holothuriidae
- Genus: Holothuria
- Species: H. thomasi

Binomial name
- Holothuria thomasi Pawson & Caycedo, 1980

= Holothuria thomasi =

Tiger tail sea cucumber

Species of sea cucumber

Holothuria thomasi, the tiger's tail, is a species of sea cucumber in the family Holothuriidae. Although it is the largest sea cucumber known in the western Atlantic Ocean, it is so well camouflaged that it was 1980 before it was first described. It is placed in the subgenus Thymiosycia making its full name Holothuria (Thymiosycia) thomasi.

== Description ==
Holothuria thomasi receives its vernacular name from its resemblance to a tiger's tail. It takes the form of an elongated cylinder with rounded ends and can reach 2 metres (6 ft 7 in) long. It is mottled with patches and streaks of dark brown, golden brown and white, sometimes with irregular rings of colour. On the upper side there are papillae, thornlike projections, which are dark brown tipped with white. The underside is paler and has several longitudinal rows of tube feet. The animal has no eyes and the mouth is at the anterior end surrounded by a fringe of about 20 shield-shaped tentacles. When it is feeding, this end is enlarged. When small, individuals move about freely, but larger ones conceal themselves in crevices or under projections and are seldom seen.

== Distribution and habitat ==
Holothuria thomasi is found in the Caribbean Sea, the Gulf of Mexico and surrounding areas. It lives on coral reefs, hidden among the bases of corals at depths of 3 metres (9.8 ft) to 30 metres (98 ft). Its favoured habitat is the escarpments of the outer reef, between the outer ridge and the steep reef slopes.

== Biology ==
Holothuria thomasi is a scavenger. Keeping its posterior end firmly anchored in a crack or underneath a rock, it sweeps the surrounding sand and algae-covered rocks with the front third of its body. The tentacles grab the detritus, sand, gravel and algae that it encounters and pushes them into its mouth. It then processes this material in its gut and expels the inedible fragments through its anus.
