= Kasai (surname) =

Kasai (written: 河西, 葛西 or 笠井) is a Japanese surname. Notable people with the surname include:

- Akira Kasai (笠井 亮, born 1952), Japanese politician
- Akira Kasai (dancer) (笠井 叡, born 1943), Japanese dancer
- Haruka Kasai (葛西 春香, born 2004), Japanese Nordic combined skier and ski jumper
- Hisashi Kasai (葛西 久, born 1943), Japanese ice hockey player
- Jun Kasai (葛西 純, born 1974), Japanese professional wrestler
- Ken'ichi Kasai (カサヰ ケンイチ, born 1970), Japanese anime director
- Kenji Kasai (笠井 賢二), Japanese table tennis player
- Kenta Kasai (笠井 健太, born 1985), Japanese football player
- Kimiko Kasai (笠井 紀美子, born 1945), retired Japanese jazz singer
- Masae Kasai (河西 昌枝, 1933–2013), former Japanese volleyball player
- Morio Kasai (葛西 森夫, 1922–2008), Japanese surgeon
- Noriaki Kasai (葛西 紀明, born 1972), Japanese ski jumper
- Tomomi Kasai (河西 智美, born 1991), Japanese singer, actress and a former member of the idol group AKB48
- Yoshiko Yoshiizumi (葛西 賀子) née Kasai (born 1980), Japanese ski jumper
- Yūichi Kasai (葛西 裕一, born 1969), Japanese boxer and boxing trainer
- Yuna Kasai (葛西 優奈, born 2004), Japanese Nordic combined skier and ski jumper

== See also ==
- Kasai clan
