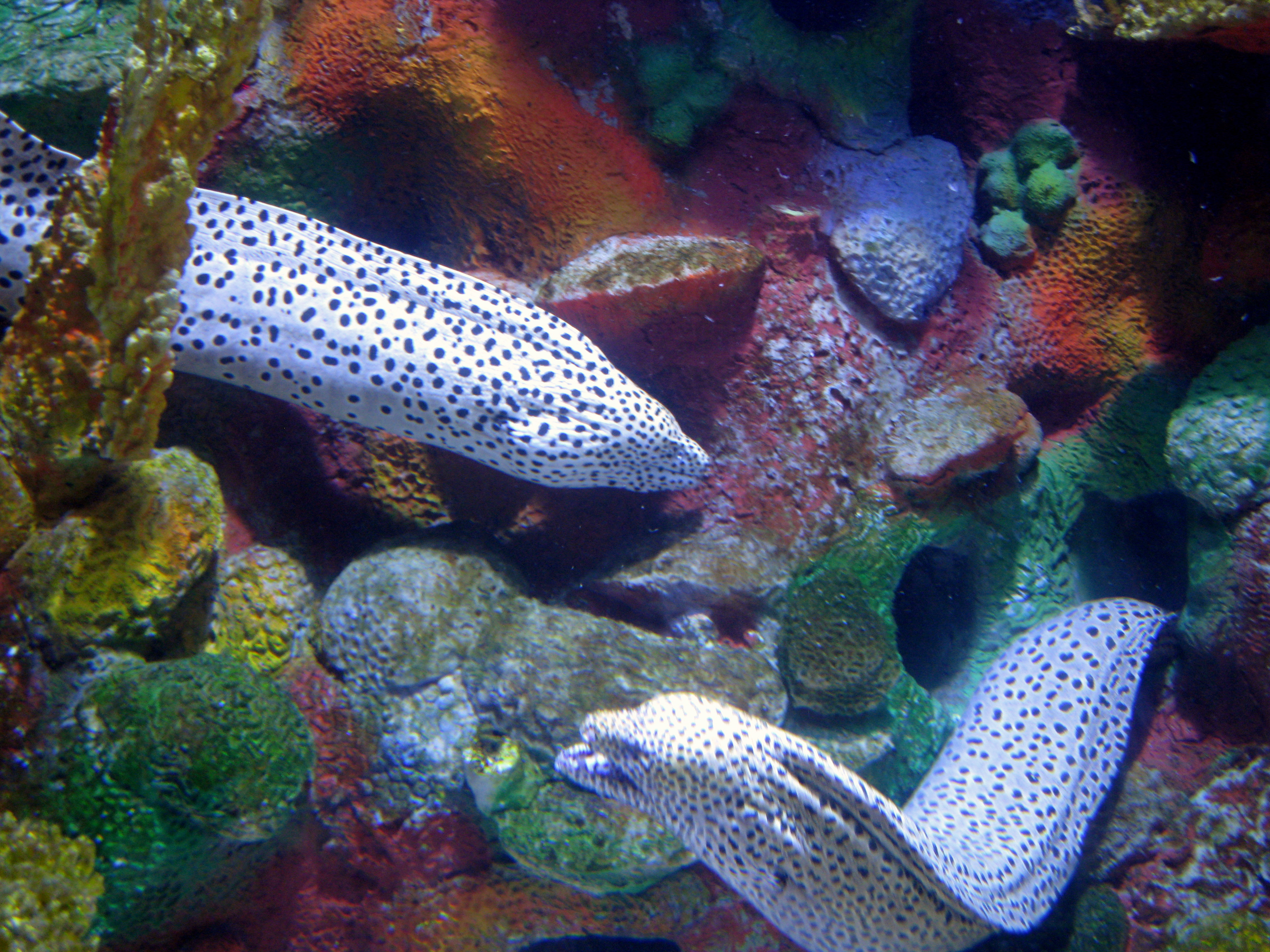

Conservation status
- Least Concern (IUCN 3.1)

Scientific classification
- Kingdom: Animalia
- Phylum: Chordata
- Class: Actinopterygii
- Order: Anguilliformes
- Family: Muraenidae
- Genus: Gymnothorax
- Species: G. isingteena

Binomial name
- Gymnothorax isingteena (J. Richardson, 1845)

= Spotted moray eel =

Species of fish

The spotted moray eel (Gymnothorax isingteena) is a species of moray eel found in coral reefs of the Pacific and Indian Oceans. It was first named by John Richardson in 1845.
