= Yellowfin grouper =

Conservation status
- Near Threatened (IUCN 3.1)

Scientific classification
- Kingdom: Animalia
- Phylum: Chordata
- Class: Actinopterygii
- Division: Teleostei
- Order: Perciformes
- Family: Epinephelidae
- Genus: Mycteroperca
- Species: M. venenosa

Binomial name
- Mycteroperca venenosa (Linnaeus, 1758)

Synonyms
- List: Bonaci cardenal Parra, 1787; Perca venenosa Linnaeus, 1758; Trisotropis venenosus (Linnaeus, 1758); Bodianus apua Bloch, 1790; Johnius guttatus Bloch & Schneider, 1801; Bodianus marginatus Bloch & Schneider, 1801; Serranus cardinalis Valenciennes, 1828; Serranus rupestris Valenciennes, 1833; Serranus petrosus Poey, 1860; Mycteroperca bowersi Evermann & Marsh, 1900

Species of fish

The yellowfin grouper (Mycteroperca venenosa) is a species of marine ray-finned fish, a grouper from the subfamily Epinephelinae which is part of the family Serranidae, which also includes the anthias and sea basses. It is found in the warmer waters of the western Atlantic Ocean.

== Taxonomy ==
The yellowfin grouper was first formally described by Carolus Linnaeus in the 10th edition of the Systema Naturae as Perca venenosa in 1758; the type locality was given as "America" but is thought to be the Bahamas.

== Distribution ==
The yellowfin grouper is found in the western Atlantic Ocean. Its range extends along the Atlantic coasts of the United States from North Carolina south to Florida and into the Gulf of Mexico where it occurs in the Florida Keys and the Flower Garden Banks National Marine Sanctuary in Texas south through the Bahamas into the West Indies and the Yucatan Peninsula in Mexico. It is also found around Bermuda. Along the Caribbean coast of South America it occurs as far east as French Guiana. It the occurs along the Brazilian coast from Maranhão to São Paulo, including the islands of Trindade and the Fernando de Noronha.

== Description ==
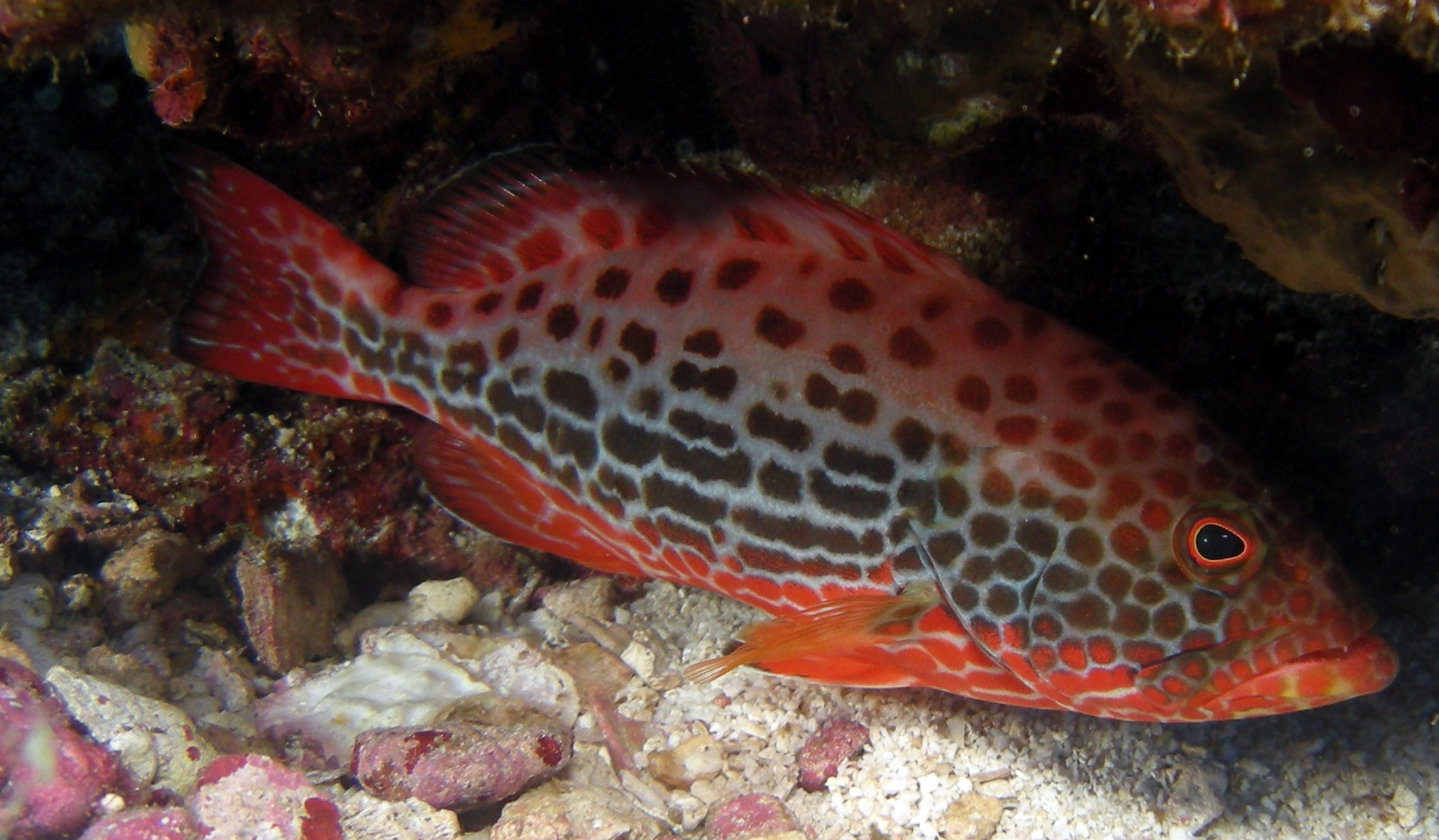
Juvenile

This species attains a total length of 100 centimetres (39 in), although they are commonly around 45 centimetres (18 in), and a maximum published weight of 18.5 kilograms (41 lb). The body is elongate, robust and compressed, its depth being no greater at the origin of the dorsal fin as it is at the origin of the anal fin. The standard length is 2.6 to 2.9 times the depth of the body. The preopercle is neatly rounded. sometimes having a small incision, and does not have a lobe at its angle. The dorsal fin contains 11 spines and 15–16 soft rays while the anal fin contains 3 spines and 10–12 soft rays. The membranes between the dorsal fin spines are notched. The caudal fin is straight in juveniles and a little concave in adults.

The head and body are marked with oval groups of dark spots and the outer third of pectoral fin is bright yellow. There are two color morphs: a deep-water reddish morph and shallow-water greenish morph.

Most males have a yellow blotch on each side of the lower jaw, while females and small males have reddish lower jaws.

== Habitat ==
The yellowfin grouper is found over rocky or coral reefs as adults; juveniles are found in beds of turtle grass. This species has also been caught by trawlers over muddy bottoms in the Gulf of Mexico. Its depth range is 2 to 137 metres (6.6 to 449.5 ft).

== Biology ==
This species is mainly piscivorous with over 90% of stomach contents sampled consisting of reef fishes with some squid.

=== Reproduction ===
It is a protogynous hermaphrodite and the females reach sexual maturity at a fork length around 51 centimetres (20 in) and at around 4.6 years old. They will then change sex to male at a fork length of 80.1 centimetres (31.5 in). It forms spawning aggregations and these occur at different times of the year in different parts of its range.

== Utilisation ==
The yellowfin grouper is caught by recreational and commercial fisheries; however, in some areas, this species is known to carry ciguatoxin and is not much caught for food.
