= Fort Bay =

Port in Saba, Caribbean Netherlands

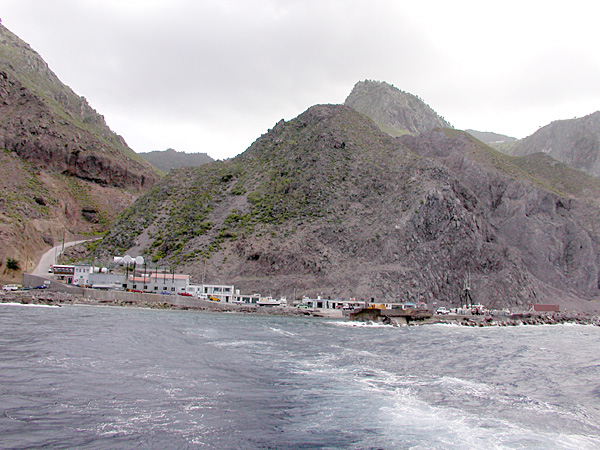
- Fort Bay
- Interactive map of Fort Bay

Location
- Country: Saba
- Location: The Bottom, Saba
- Coordinates: 17°36′59.04″N 63°15′5.04″W

Details
- Opened: 1972
- Type of Harbor: Artificial
- No. of piers: 2

Statistics
- Website www.sabaport.com

Fort Bay is the official and only port on the island of Saba, in the Caribbean Netherlands. It is located on the south side of the island, about 1 mile (1.6 km) by road from The Bottom. The port is very important for the island as most of its supplies arrive here by boat.

== History ==
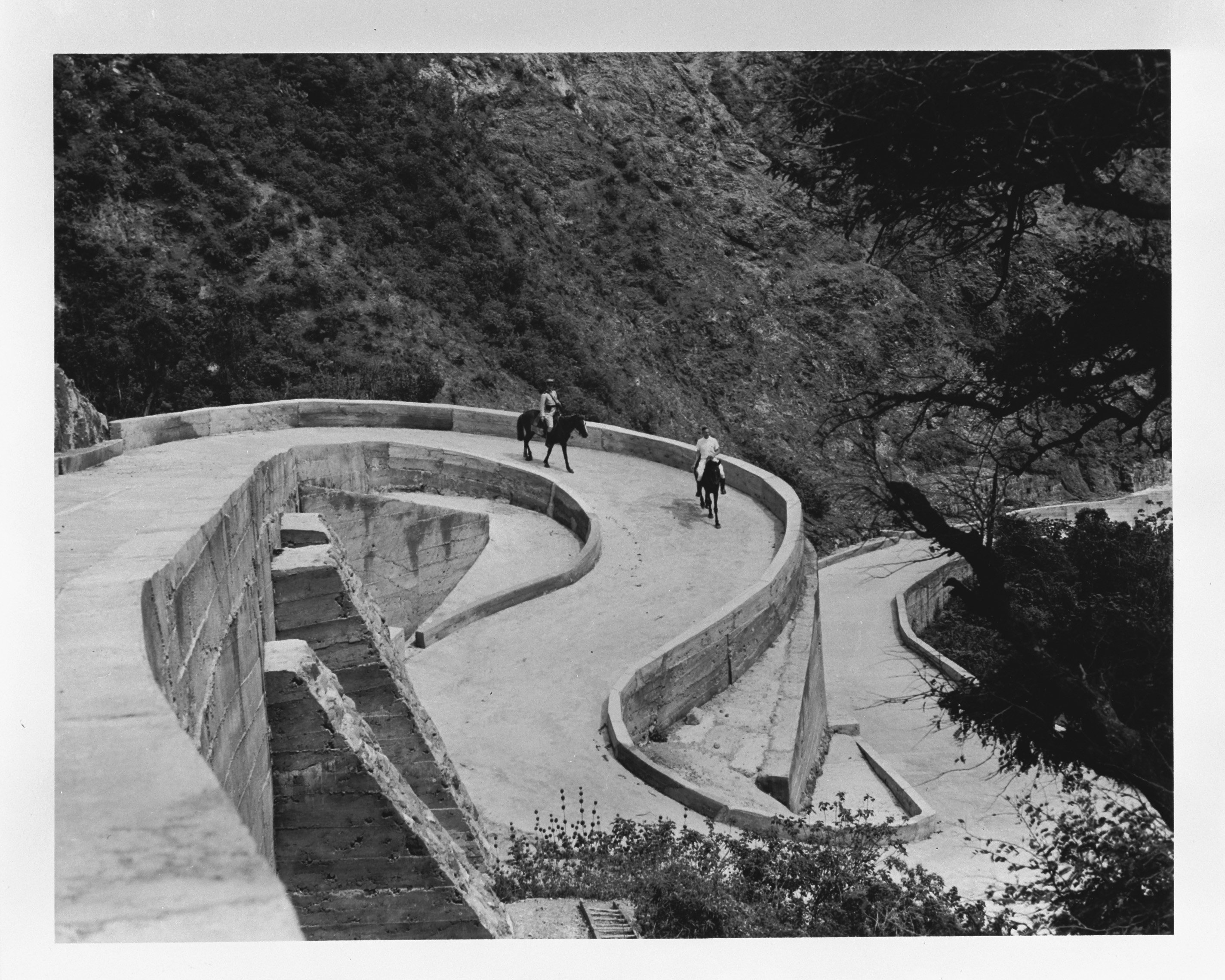
Segment of "The Road" connecting Fort Bay to The Bottom

Prior to the opening of the road to Fort Bay, the primary way to get goods and people on or off the island was via Ladder Bay (and its 800 perilous steps hand-cut out of the cliffside).

Fort Bay's first pier was constructed in November 1972. Since then, Fort Bay harbor has grown to multiple piers:

- Capt. Leo Chance Pier, the larger pier, dedicated to cargo boats, dive boats, and ferries
- Multipurpose/fishermen's pier, mostly used by local fishermen
- Tender pier, used for tendering passengers from yachts and small cruise ships

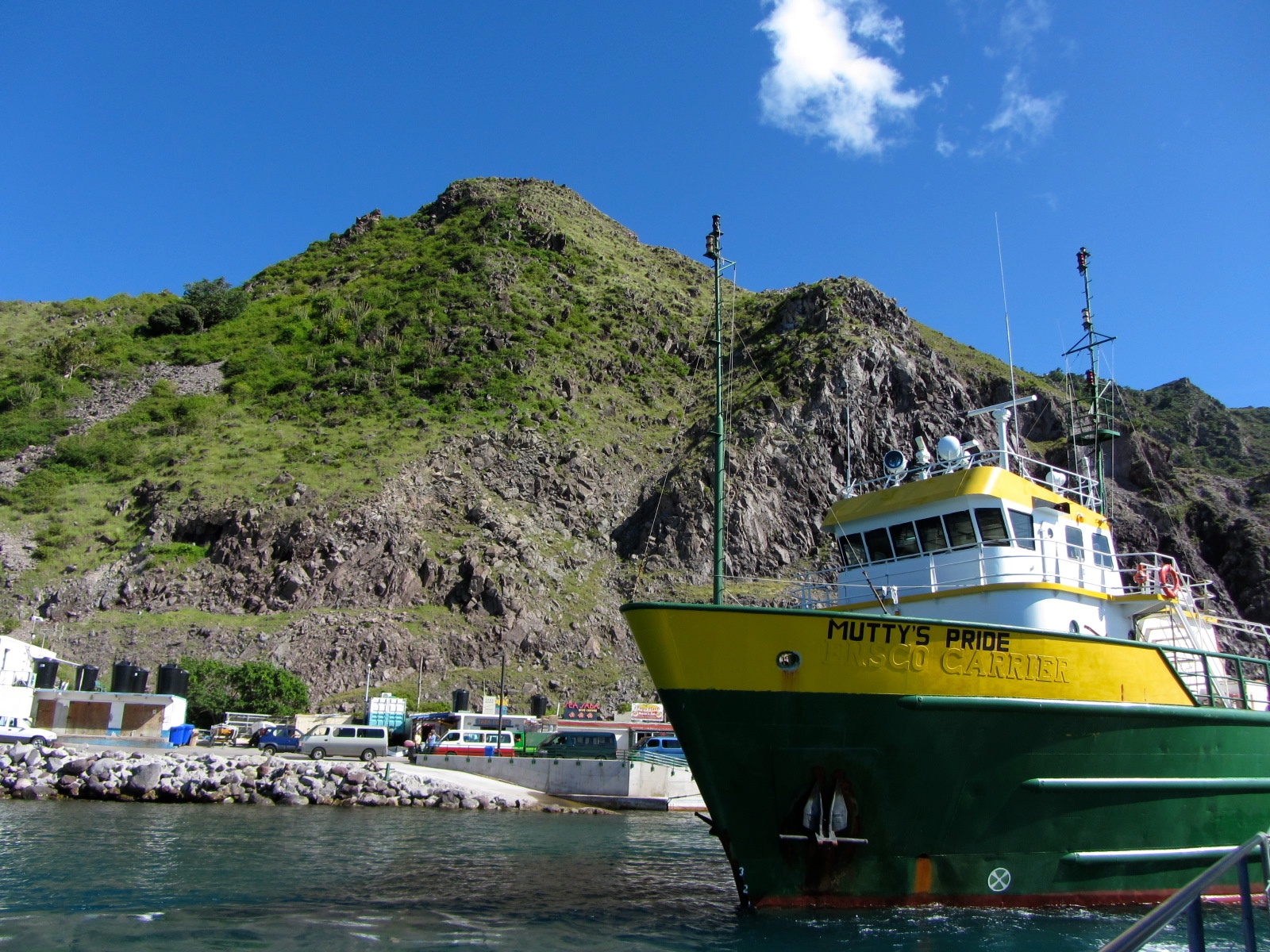
Cargo ship docked at Capt. Leo Chance Pier, Fort Bay

During 2010–2011, various improvements were made to the Fort Bay harbor, including the quay wall, boat ramp, and retaining wall. In 2023, upgrades were done to Capt. Leo Chance Pier and the roll-on/roll-off pier.

The port is also home to the Saba Sea Rescue Organization that have a rescue ship stationed just outside the mouth to the port. The ship is equipped with decompression tanks, rescue equipment and personnel. On land at Fort Bay, there is a hyperbaric chamber for diving emergency situations.

The port has two bars and one restaurant which are frequently visited by locals and tourists. Additionally the island's only gas station is situated located just past Fort Bay.

Fort Bay has been affected by several hurricanes over the years, including breakwaters damage in Hurricane Lenny in 1999, one of the piers being destroyed by Hurricane Omar in 2008, and the fisherman's pier being damaged by Hurricane Irma and later destroyed by Hurricane Maria in 2017.

== Transport ==
Fort Bay has multiple ferry services operating between Saba and Sint Maarten, including The Edge (based on Sint Maarten), and the Dawn II (based on Saba) with almost daily trips.

== Gallery ==
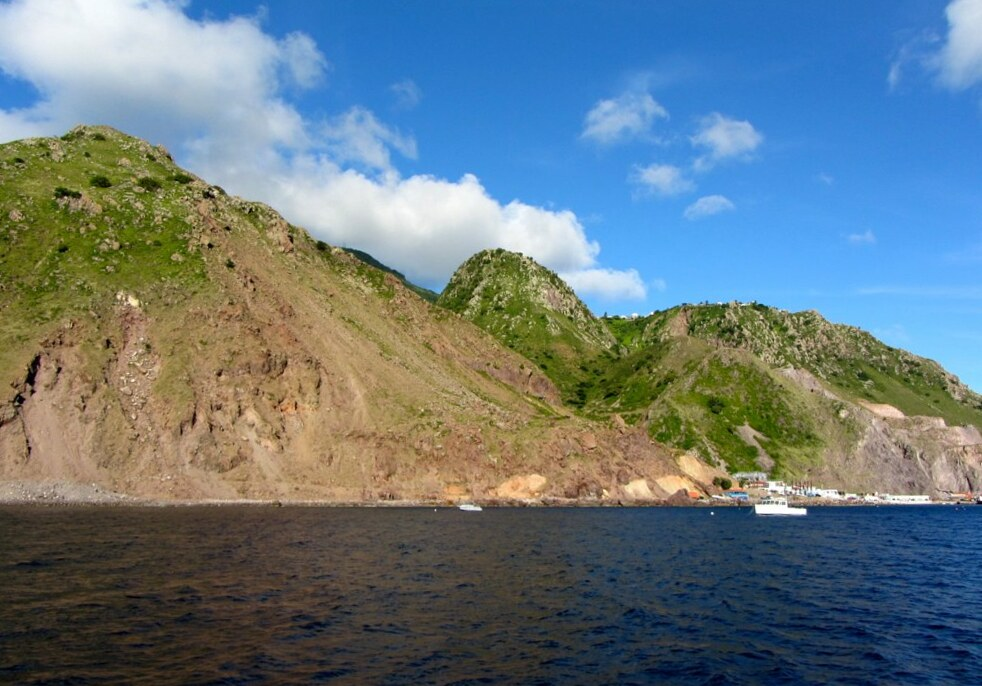
Tent Bay (left) and Fort Bay (right)

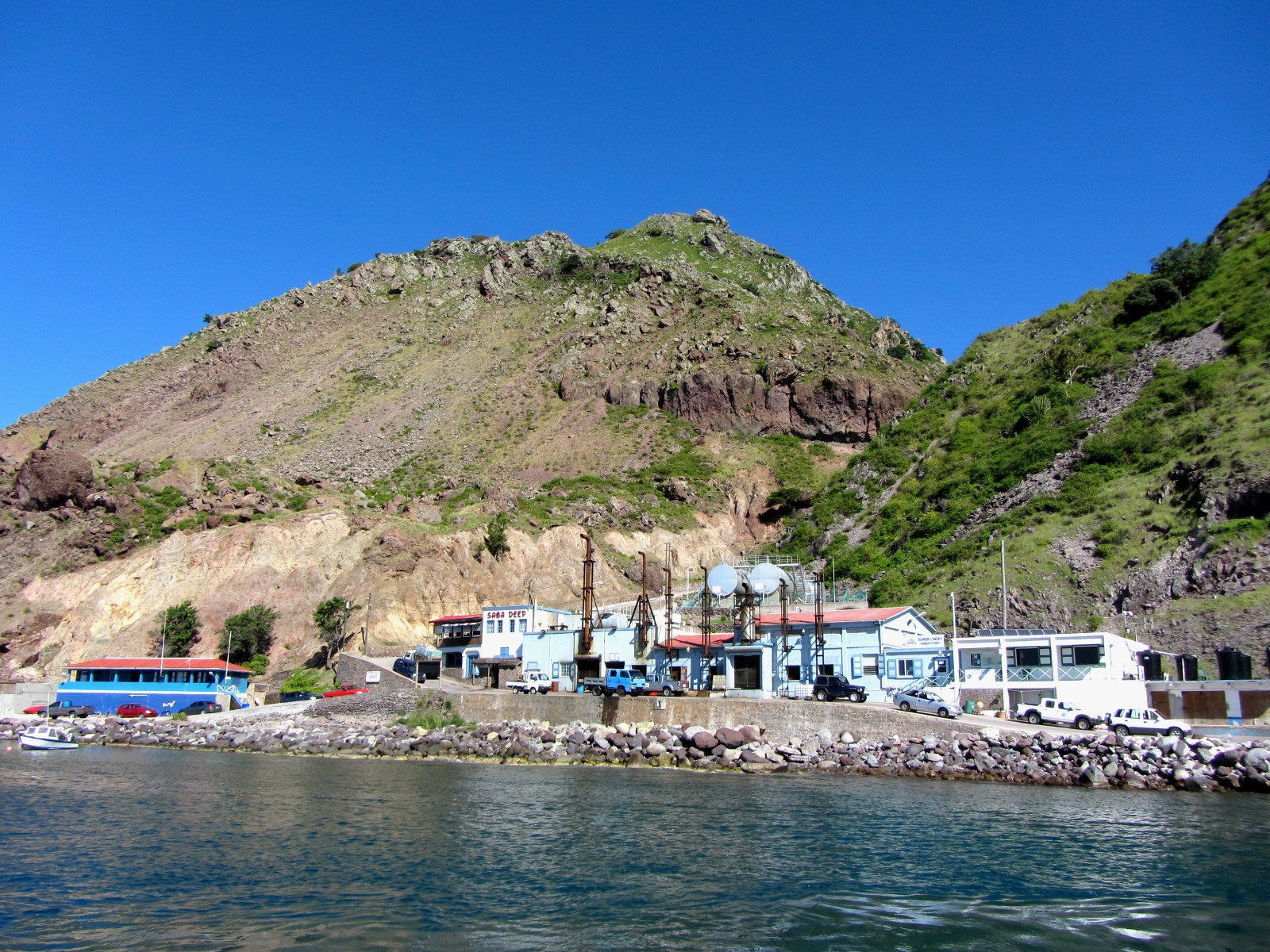
Dive center and water treatment building near entrance (from road) to Fort Bay

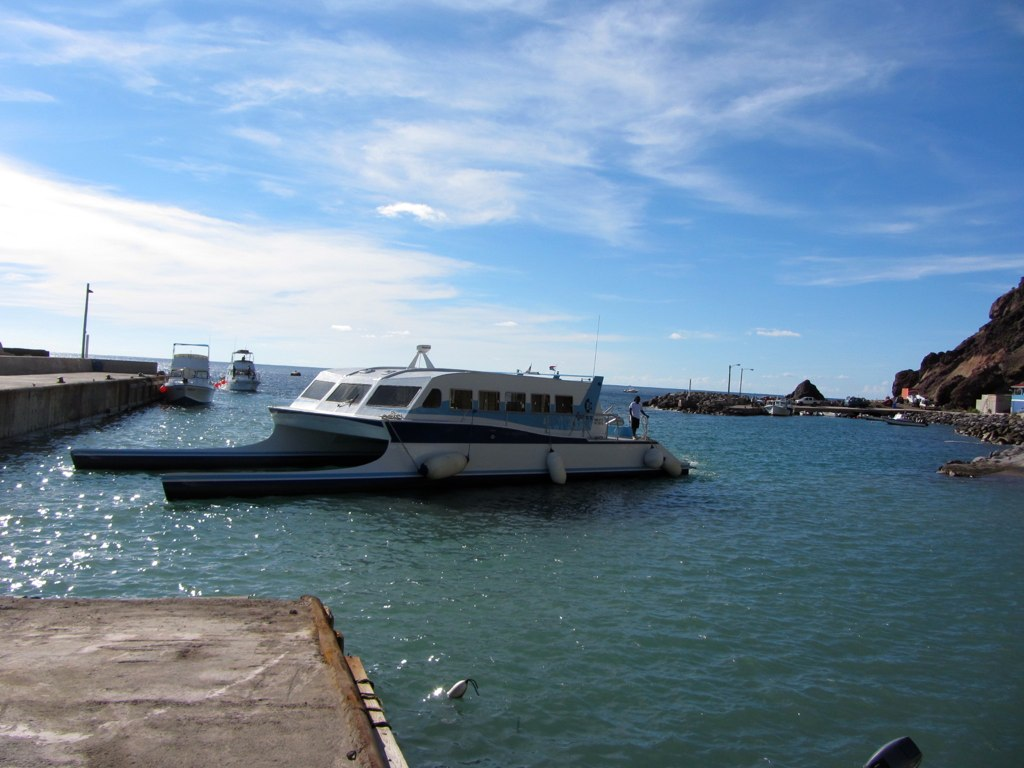
Ferry in Fort Bay harbor

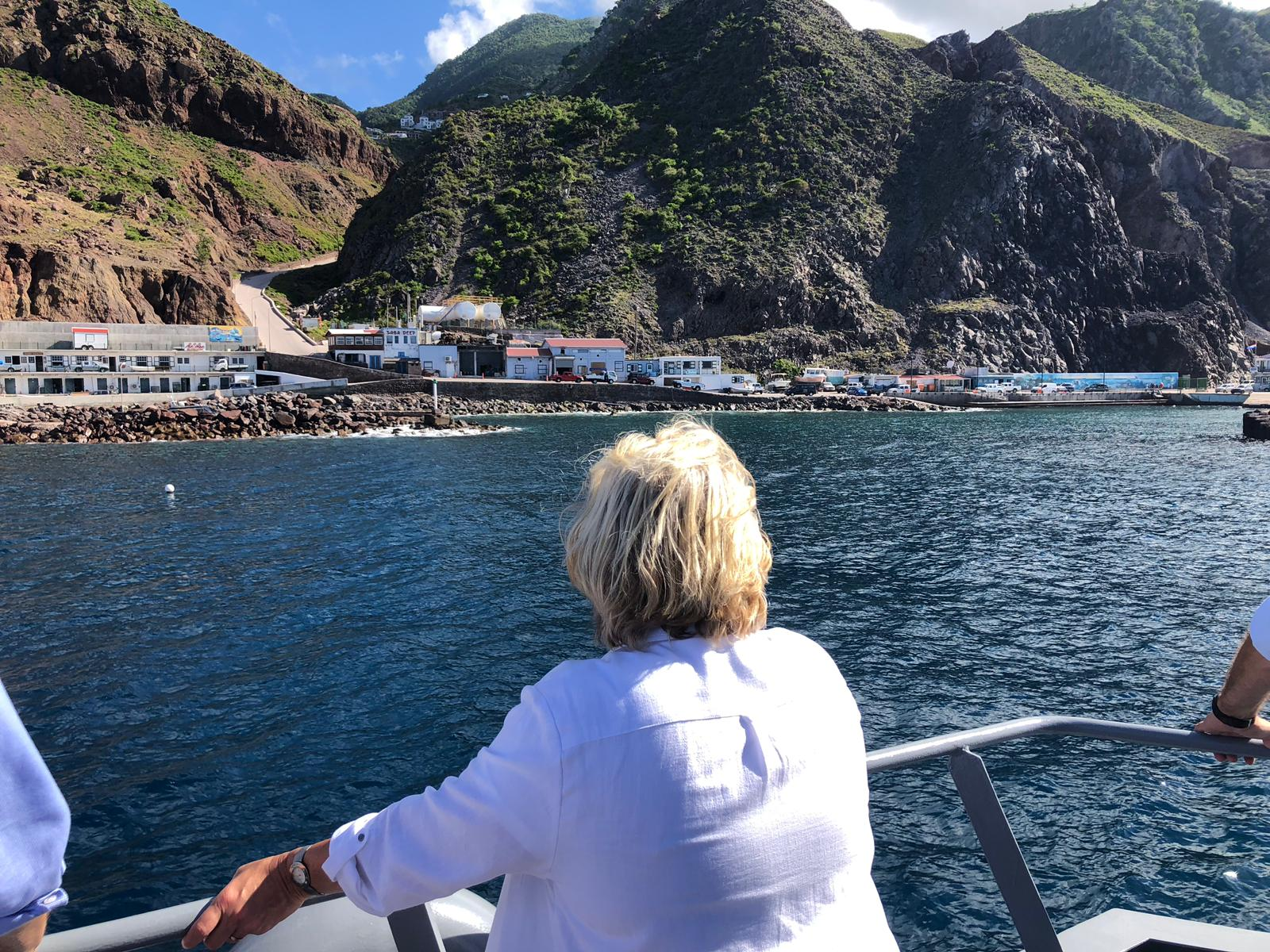
View of Fort Bay from ferry
