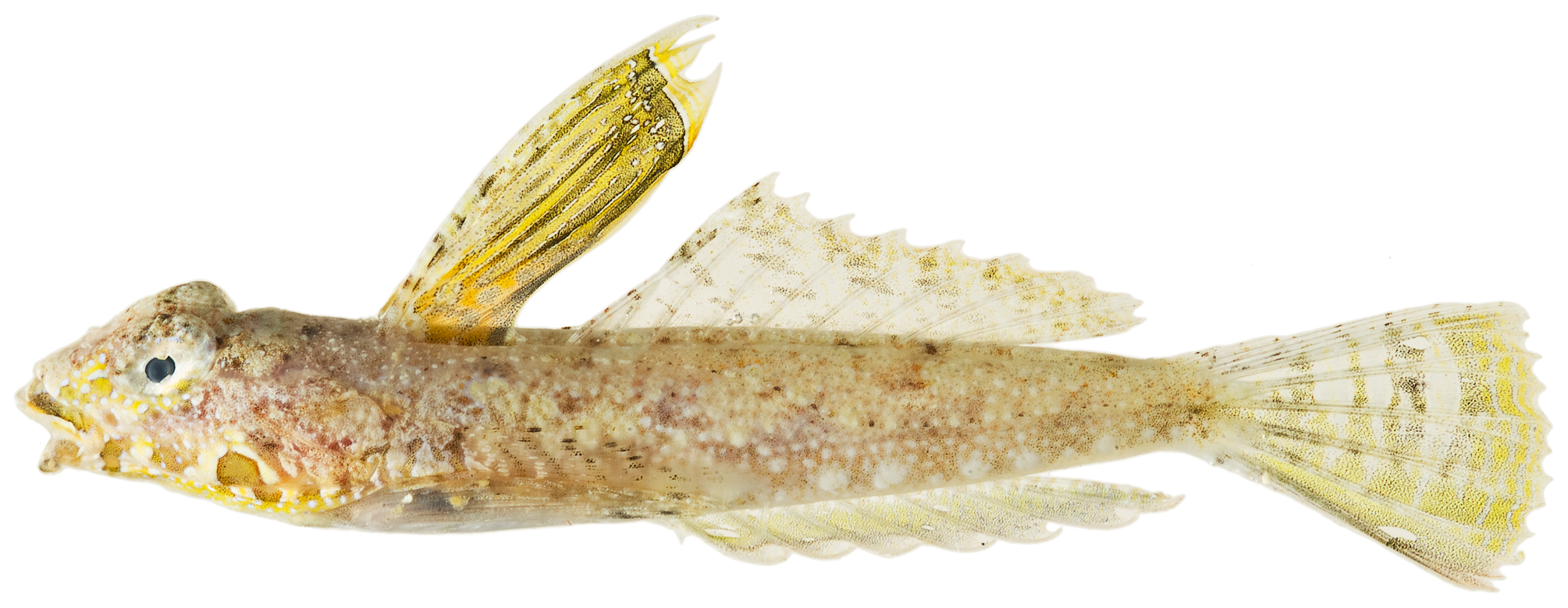

Conservation status
- Least Concern (IUCN 3.1)

Scientific classification
- Domain: Eukaryota
- Kingdom: Animalia
- Phylum: Chordata
- Class: Actinopterygii
- Order: Callionymiformes
- Family: Callionymidae
- Genus: Callionymus
- Species: C. bairdi

Binomial name
- Callionymus bairdi Jordan, 1888

Synonyms
- Callionymus sanctaehelenae Fricke, 1983; Callionymus boekeri Metzelaar, 1919; Callionymus sanctieustatii Metzelaar, 1919; Paradiplogrammus bairdi (Jordan, 1888)

= Lancer dragonet =

Species of fish

The lancer dragonet (Callionymus bairdi), Baird's dragonet, coral dragonet or St Helena dragonet, is a species of dragonet native to the warmer waters of the Atlantic Ocean where it occurs at depths of from 1 to 91 metres (3.3 to 298.6 ft). In the western Atlantic it occurs from Cape Hatteras southwards along the east coast of North America. including Bermuda and the Bahamas, into the Gulf of Mexico and throughout the Caribbean Sea. It has also been recorded from Ilha da Trindade off Brazil. In the eastern Atlantic it has been recorded from the Cape Verde Islands, Ascension Island, St. Helena, and Sao Tome e Principe in the Gulf of Guinea. This species grows to a length of 11.4 centimetres (4.5 in) TL.

Callionymus bairdi is found over sandy bottoms but also over substrates of rocky-rubble. It occurs in shallow reefs as well as in beds of Thalassia testudinum. It is a sexually dimorphic species. The juveniles occur shallower than 15m.

The specific name honours the U.S. ornithologist and ichthyologist Spencer Fullerton Baird (1823-1887).
