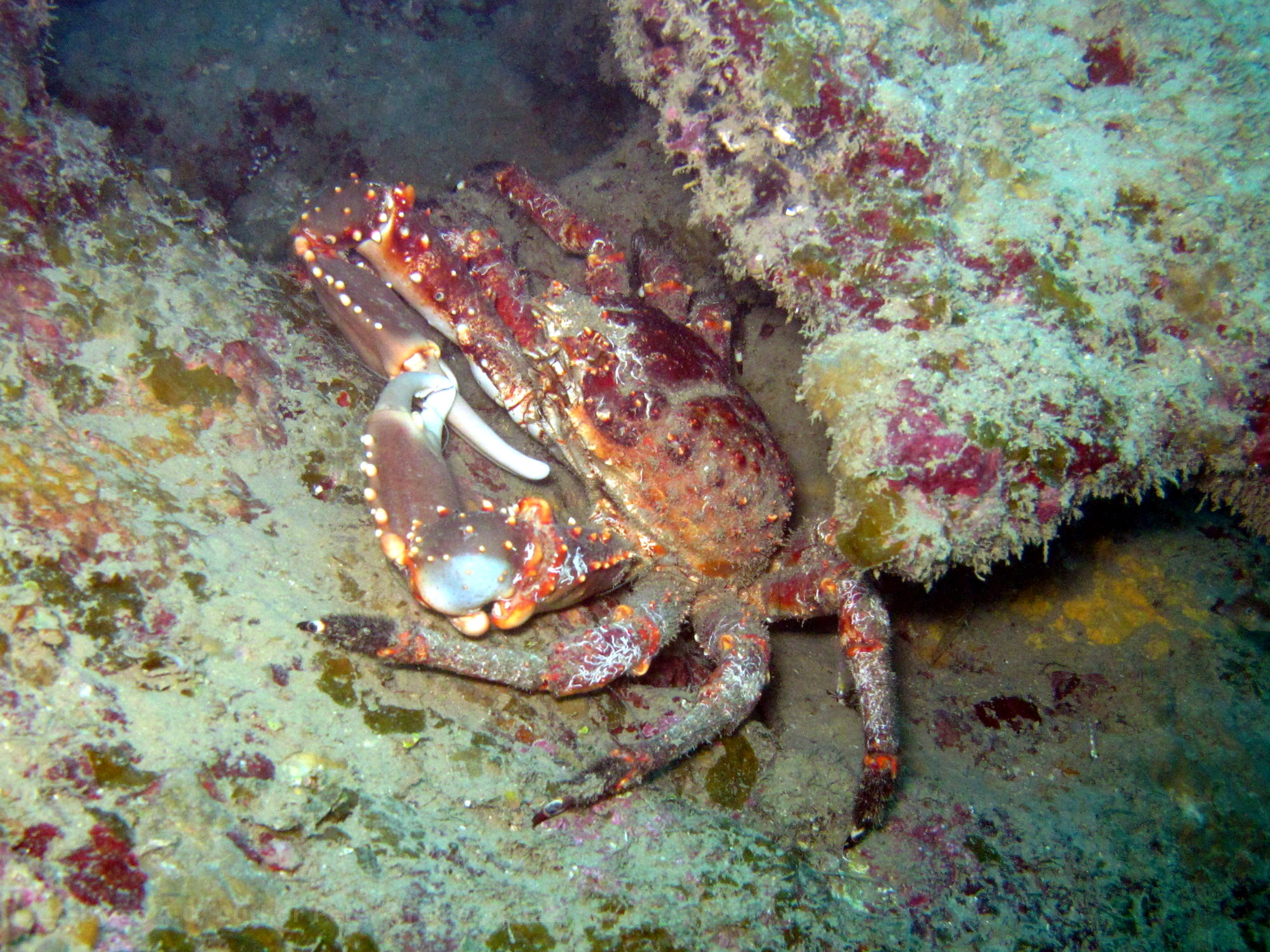

Scientific classification
- Kingdom: Animalia
- Phylum: Arthropoda
- Clade: Pancrustacea
- Class: Malacostraca
- Order: Decapoda
- Suborder: Pleocyemata
- Infraorder: Brachyura
- Family: Mithracidae
- Genus: Maguimithrax; Klompmaker, Portell, Klier, Prueter & Tucker, 2015
- Species: M. spinosissimus

Binomial name
- Maguimithrax spinosissimus (Lamarck, 1818)

Synonyms
- Damithrax spinosissimus; Maia spinosissimus; Mithrax spinosissimus

= Maguimithrax =

Species of crustacean

Maguimithrax spinosissimus, also known as the Caribbean king crab, West Indian spider crab, channel clinging crab, reef or spiny spider crab, and coral crab, is a species of spider crab that occurs throughout South Florida and across the Caribbean Islands.

== Description ==
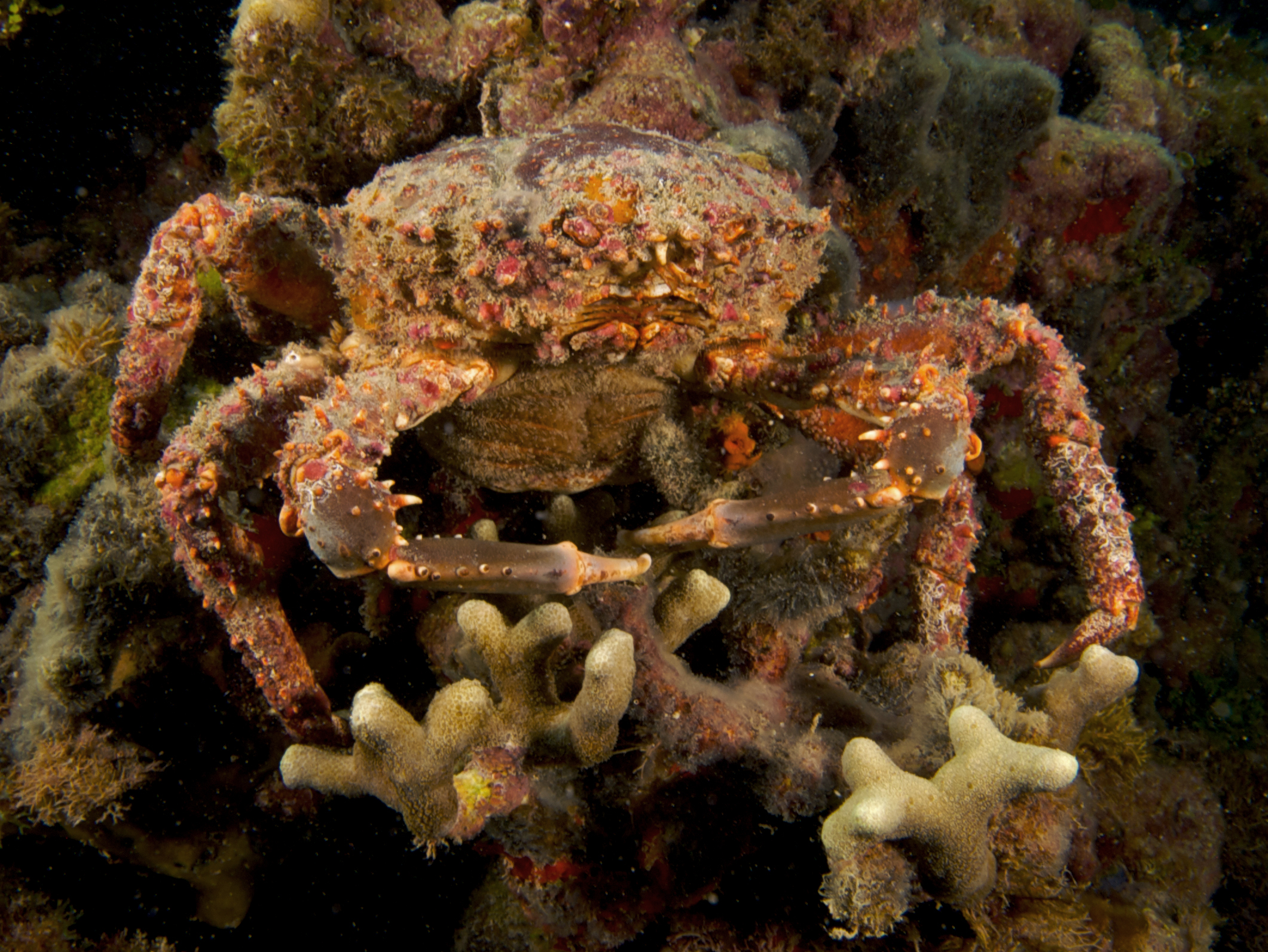
Female

Maguimithrax spinosissimus has a reddish-brown carapace and walking legs. The claws are smooth, purplish gray, with a single row of nodules along the outer edge, and blunt claw tips. The legs are covered with numerous short spines and nodules. It is the largest native crab species of the Atlantic. It can reach up to 3 kg of weight and a carapace length of 18 cm.

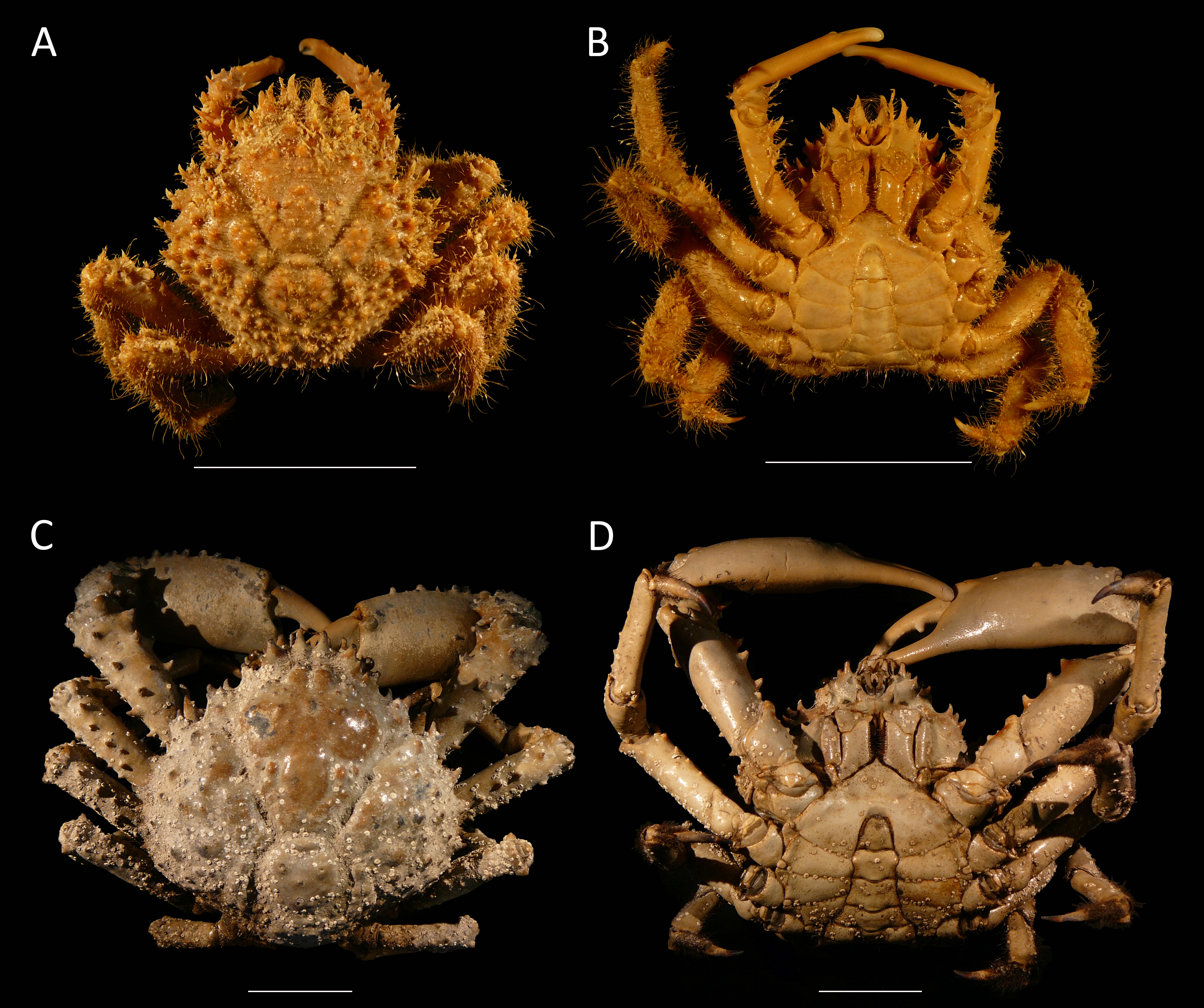
Dorsal and ventral views of two different sized males

== Distribution ==
Maguimithrax spinosissimus is found from North Carolina to Venezuela. It inhabits caves and reef underhangs from the shallow intertidal to depths of up to 200 m.

It was made the type species of a separate genus Maguimithrax by Klompmaker et al. (2015). This genus is named after actor Tobey Maguire, who has starred as Spider-Man in 4 films.

== Diet ==
The diet of this crab is largely unknown; however, it is considered a large omnivore that has been noted to feed on algae and carrion. It has been studied for its ability to remove seaweed from coral reefs due to its "powerful grazing ability". Unlike crabs such as the blue crab, the West Indian spider crab is not commercially harvested for its meat.

== Human intervention ==
Mote Marine Laboratory in Florida is spawning the crabs in hopes they will eat algae and benefit coral reefs.

== See also ==
- Filistata maguirei, a species of spider also named after Tobey Maguire
- List of organisms named after famous people (born 1975–present)
