= Winair =

Airline based in Sint Maarten

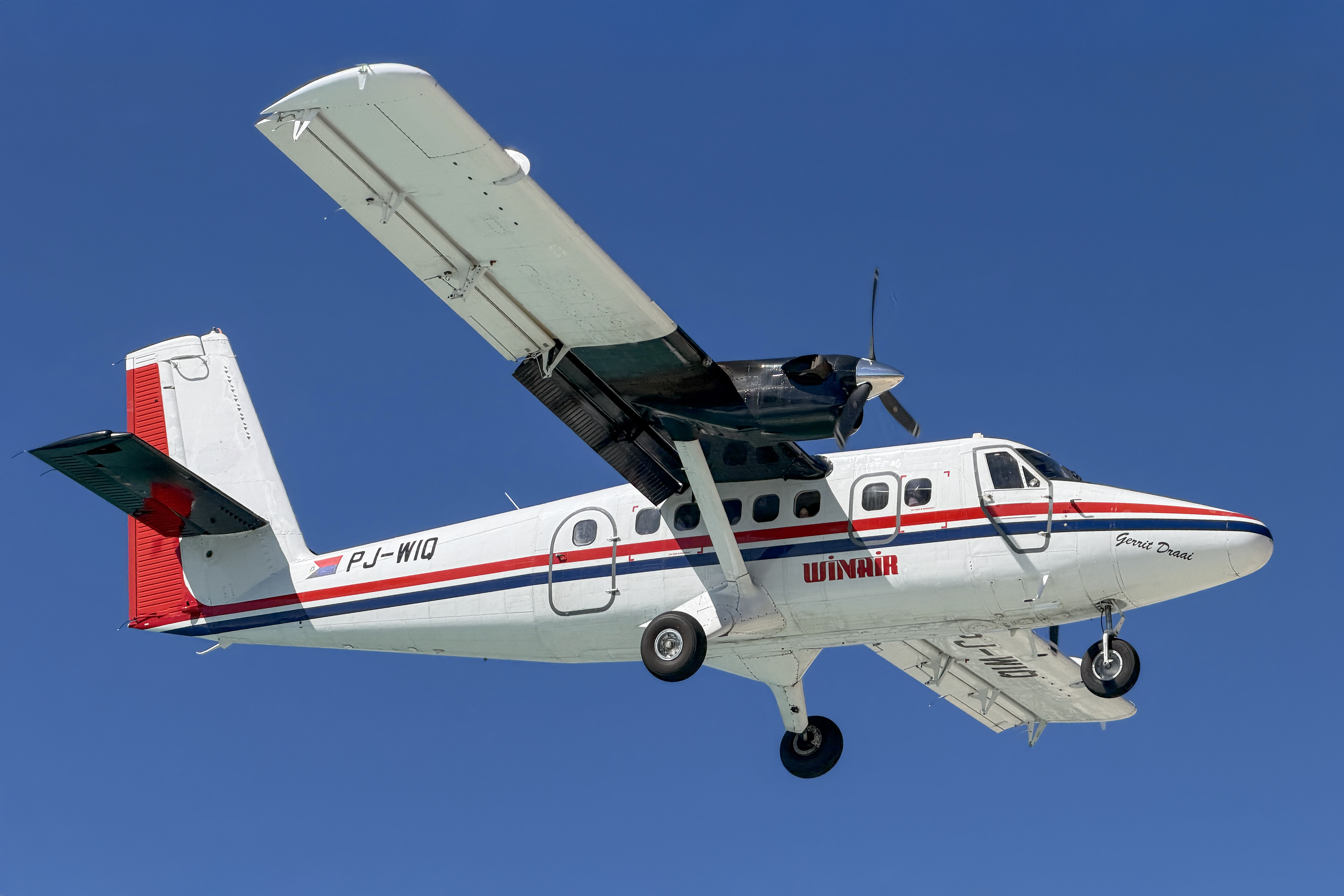
- Winair's DHC-6 Twin Otter
IATA	ICAO	Call sign
WM	WIA	WINDWARD
- Founded: 24 August 1961; 65 years ago
- Commenced operations: 5 July 1962; 64 years ago
- Hubs: Princess Juliana International Airport
- Frequent-flyer program: Flying Blue
- Alliance: Caribsky
- Fleet size: 9
- Destinations: 17
- Headquarters: Princess Juliana International Airport, Philipsburg, Sint Maarten
- Key people: Hans van de Velde (CEO)
- Founders: Georges Greaux; Hippolyte Ledee
- Website: www.fly-winair.sx

Winair (short for Windward Islands Airways International NV) is a government-owned Dutch regional airline based in Sint Maarten. Founded in 1961 by Georges Greaux and Hippolyte Ledee, It has a fleet of nine aircraft serving destinations mostly within the Leeward Islands group of the Lesser Antilles in the North East Caribbean. It has its headquarters on the grounds of Princess Juliana International Airport. It is also the flag carrier airline of Sint Maarten. Since 1 March 2023, it has been a part of the Flying Blue frequent-flyer programme.

== History ==
Windward Islands Airways was founded in 1961 by Georges Greaux with additional investments from Hipployte Ledee, Chester Wathey, Louis Richardson, and a handful of others. The airline required short takeoff and landing (STOL) aircraft to serve certain airports, such as Juancho E. Yrausquin Airport on Saba, which has the shortest commercial runway in the world. The 1 December 1963, Windward Islands Airways timetable lists flights between St. Maarten and Saba operated with STOL-capable Dornier Do 28 aircraft. Winair began flying de Havilland Canada DHC-6 Twin Otters in January 1967.

== Destinations ==
Winair operates services to the following scheduled destinations:

Country	City	Airport	Notes	Refs
Antigua and Barbuda	St. John's	V. C. Bird International Airport		
Aruba	Oranjestad	Queen Beatrix International Airport		
Barbados	Bridgetown	Grantley Adams International Airport		
Bonaire	Kralendijk	Flamingo International Airport		
British Virgin Islands	Tortola	Terrance B. Lettsome International Airport		
Curaçao	Willemstad	Curaçao International Airport		
Dominica	Marigot	Douglas–Charles Airport		
Haiti	Port-au-Prince	Toussaint Louverture International Airport		
Martinique	Fort-de-France	Martinique Aimé Césaire International Airport		
Montserrat	Brades	John A. Osborne Airport		
Saba	Flat Point (Zion's Hill)	Juancho E. Yrausquin Airport		
Saint-Barthélemy	Saint-Jean	Gustaf III Airport		
Saint Kitts and Nevis	Basseterre	Robert L. Bradshaw International Airport		
Saint Kitts and Nevis	Newcastle, Nevis	Vance W. Amory International Airport		
Saint Lucia	Castries	George F. L. Charles Airport		
Saint Vincent and the Grenadines	Kingstown	Argyle International Airport		
Sint Eustatius	Oranjestad	F.D. Roosevelt Airport		
Sint Maarten	Philipsburg	Princess Juliana International Airport	Hub	
Trinidad & Tobago	Port of Spain	Piarco International Airport		
United States	San Juan	Luis Muñoz Marín International Airport	Terminated	

=== Codeshare agreements ===
Winair has interline and codeshare agreements with the following airlines:

- Air Antilles
- Air Caraïbes
- Air France
- British Airways
- Caribbean Airlines
- Copa Airlines
- Corsair International
- Delta Air Lines
- KLM
- United Airlines
- Virgin Atlantic
- Surinam Airways

== Fleet ==
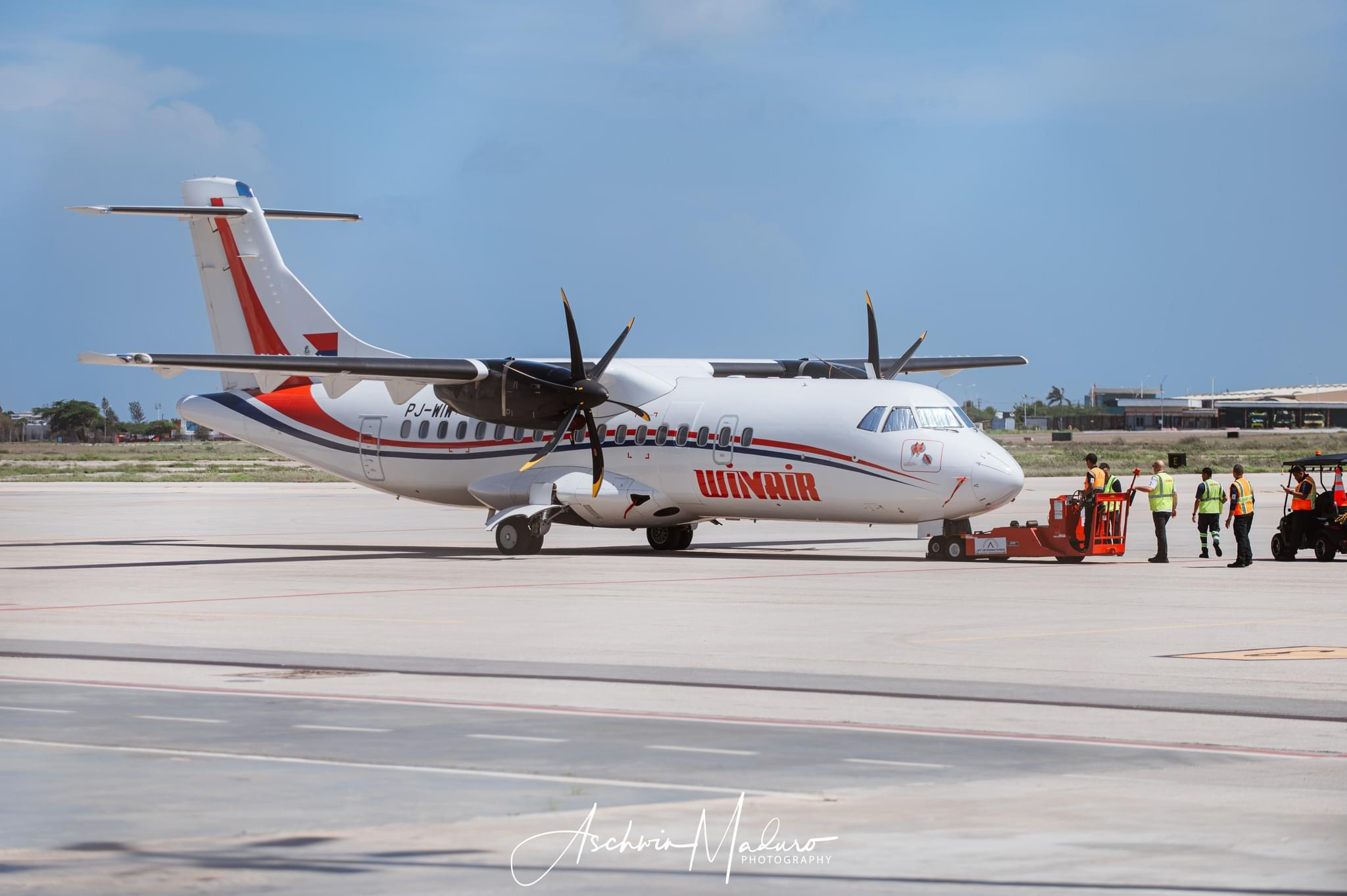
ATR 42

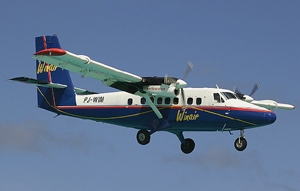
Winair de Havilland Canada DHC-6-300 "Twin Otter"

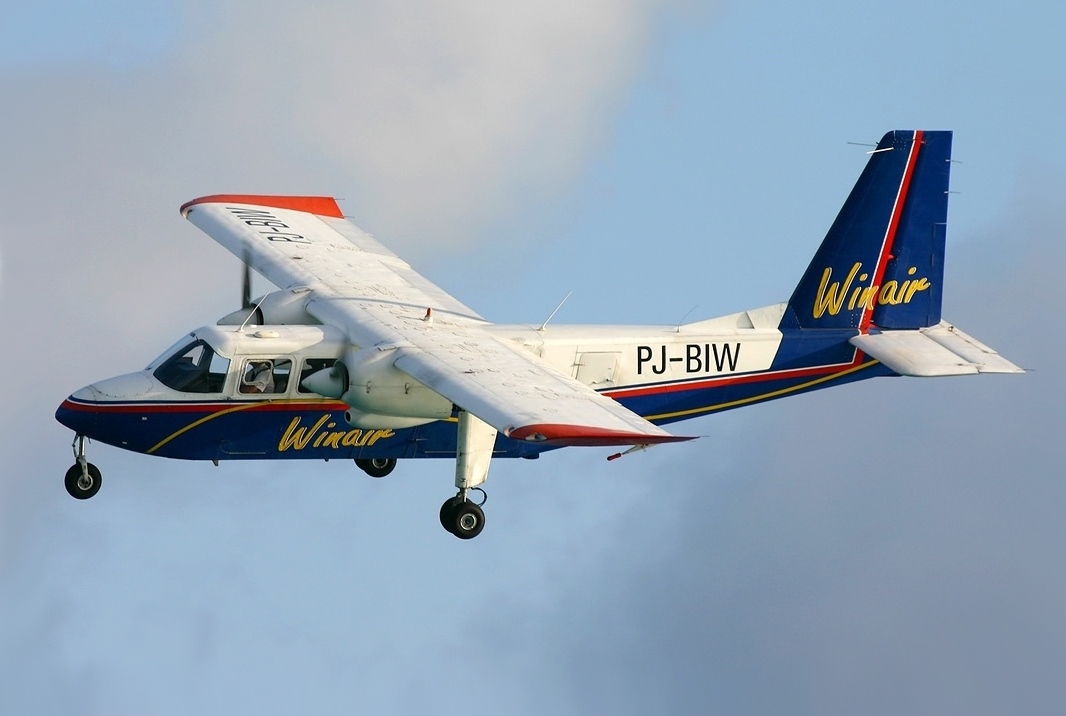
A formerly operated Britten-Norman BN-2 Islander

=== Current fleet ===
As of August 2025, Winair operates the following aircraft:

Aircraft	In service	Orders	Passengers	Notes
ATR 42-500	4	—	48	
de Havilland Canada Dash 6-300 Twin Otter	5	—	19	
Total	9	—		

=== Historic fleet ===
According to the 1 December 1963 Windward Islands Airways timetable the airline was operating STOL-capable Dornier Do-28 as well as Piper Apache aircraft. Additionally, Winair has previously operated Britten-Norman BN-2 Islanders, Fokker F-27s, Beech Twin Bonanzas, and NAMC-YS 11s.

== See also ==
- List of airlines of the Dutch Caribbean
