= Cove Bay (Saba) =

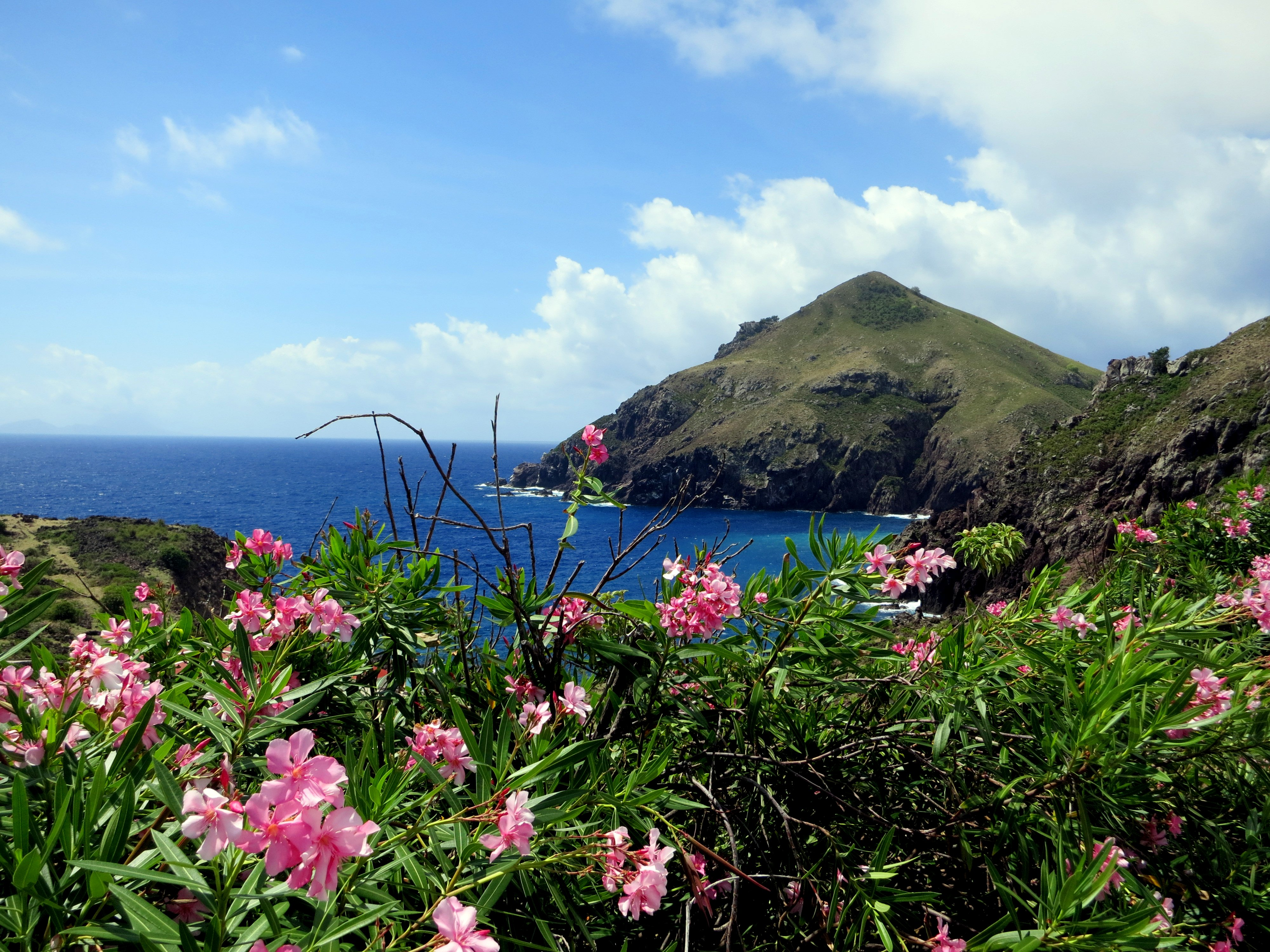
- Cove Bay, with Old Booby Hill beyond

- Location on Saba
- Location: Flat Point, Saba
- Coordinates: 17°38′30″N 63°13′11″W
- Type: Bay
- Primary inflows: Caribbean Sea
- Max. depth: 90 ft (27 m)
- Settlements: Flat Point, Zion's Hill

Cove Bay is a is coastal bay on the island of Saba in the Dutch Caribbean. It is located on the southeastern coast of the Flat Point peninsula, below the Juancho E. Yrausquin Airport and the Flat Point Tide Pools.

The bay is one of a few places for swimming on Saba. Cove Bay's swimming area is shielded from waves by a wall of large rocks; these rocks were brought down from Flat Point after being removed to help make airplane approaches easier. Cove Bay is a snorkeling site and dive site. The area is also popular for barbecues and picnics. Sand has been brought in to Cove Bay from St. Maarten, to create an artificial beach.

== History ==
The entire Flat Point peninsula was formed during volcanic activity about 5,000 years ago. The end of a large lava flow formed the peninsula as it cooled. It was occupied by Amerindians sometime between 400 A.D. and 800 A.D. Archeological surveys uncovered pre-columbian ceramics and conch shell adzes.

In the 17th and 18th centuries, the Flat Point peninsula was the site of a sugar and indigo plantation. According to archeological surveys, the plantation had at least one indigo boiling house, two wells, and two domestic structures for enslaved Africans. One of the wells was located at Cove Bay, and one of the domestic structures was on the cliff overlooking Cove Bay. Archeologists believe the plantation's location allowed for easy transportation of indigo and sugar from Cove Bay to a larger ship in nearby Spring Bay. In 1781, Cove Bay may have been the landing point for the British during their capture of Saba.

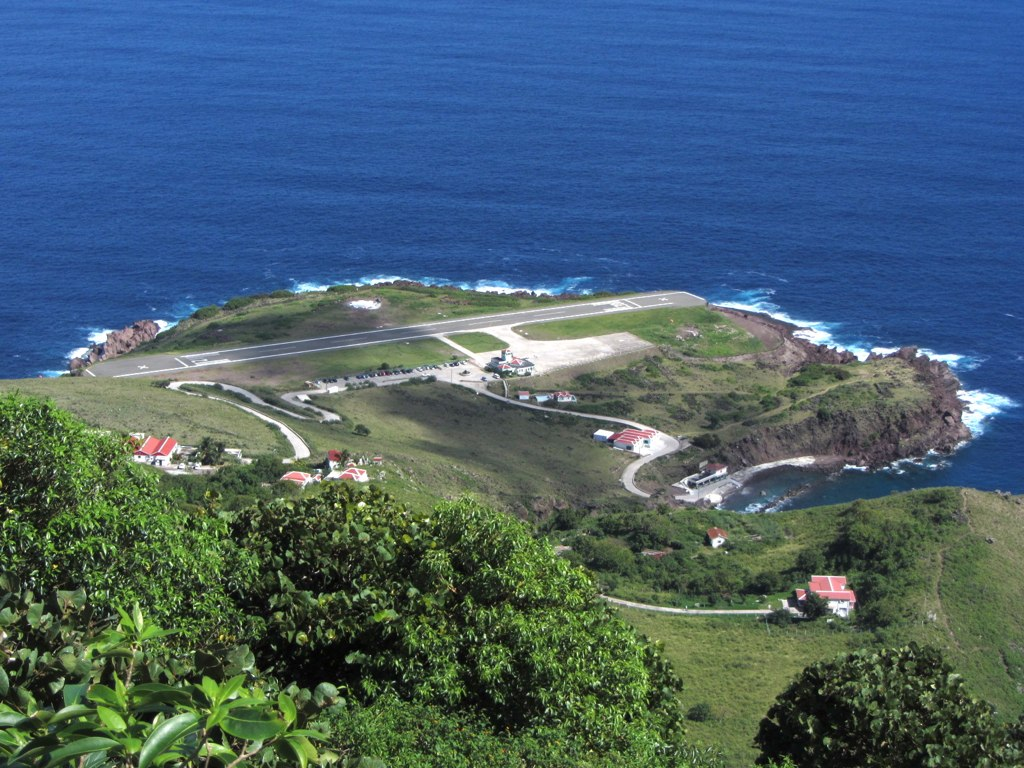
Flat Point peninsula, with Cove Bay below (right)

Before docking facilities were built on Saba, imported lumber intended for Hell's Gate was thrown overboard near Fort Bay, rowed around the island to Cove Bay, and then brought up to Hell's Gate by donkeys or people. In 1911, rafters for the construction of a Catholic church in Hell's Gate were likely brought in via Cove Bay.

In 1963, Saba's airport officially began service, built on the flat stretch of land just above Cove Bay. In the 1990s, there was a leather factory between Cove Bay and the airport; in 2012, Saba Comprehensive School's Technical Vocational Education and Training (TVET) moved in to the former leather factory building. In 2014, a children's playground was built at Cove Bay.

== Nature ==
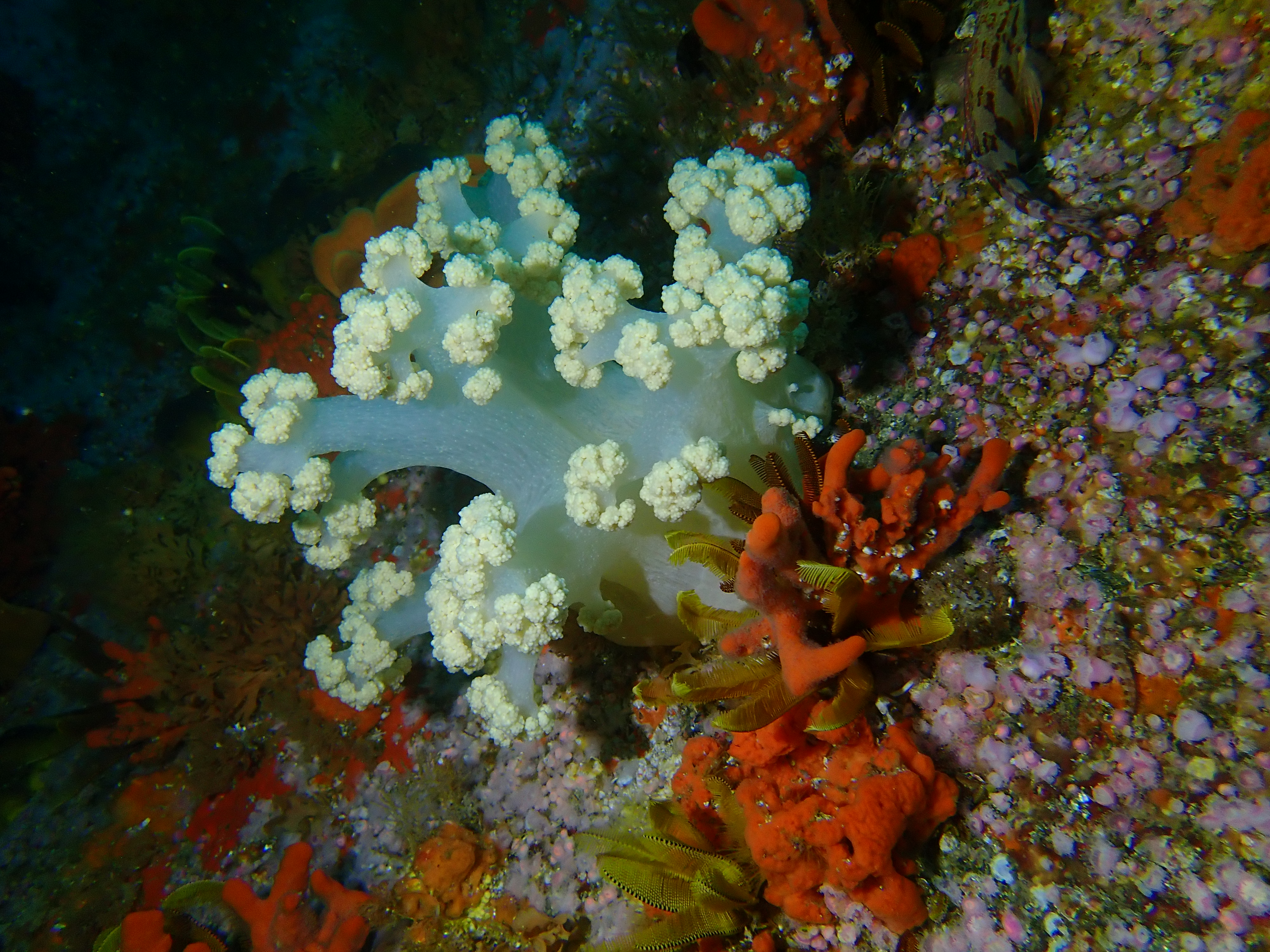
Soft coral (Alcyonacea)

Snorkelers or divers can expect to see red and yellow soft corals (Alcyonacea), Devil's Sea Whips (Ellisella barbadensis), Green Moray Eels (Gymnothorax funebris), Midnight Parrotfish (Scarus coelestinus), and Nurse Sharks (Ginglymostoma cirratum) in Cove Bay.

Birds in the Flat Point area include the Common Ground Dove (Columbigallina passerina nigrirostris), the Brown Noddy (Anous stolidus stolidus), and the Least Sandpiper (Calidris minutilla). Flat Point is a nesting site for the White-tailed Tropicbird (Phaeton lepturus catesbyi; also called the Yellow-billed Tropicbird).

In 2015, sea turtles hatched at Cove Bay.

== Amenities ==
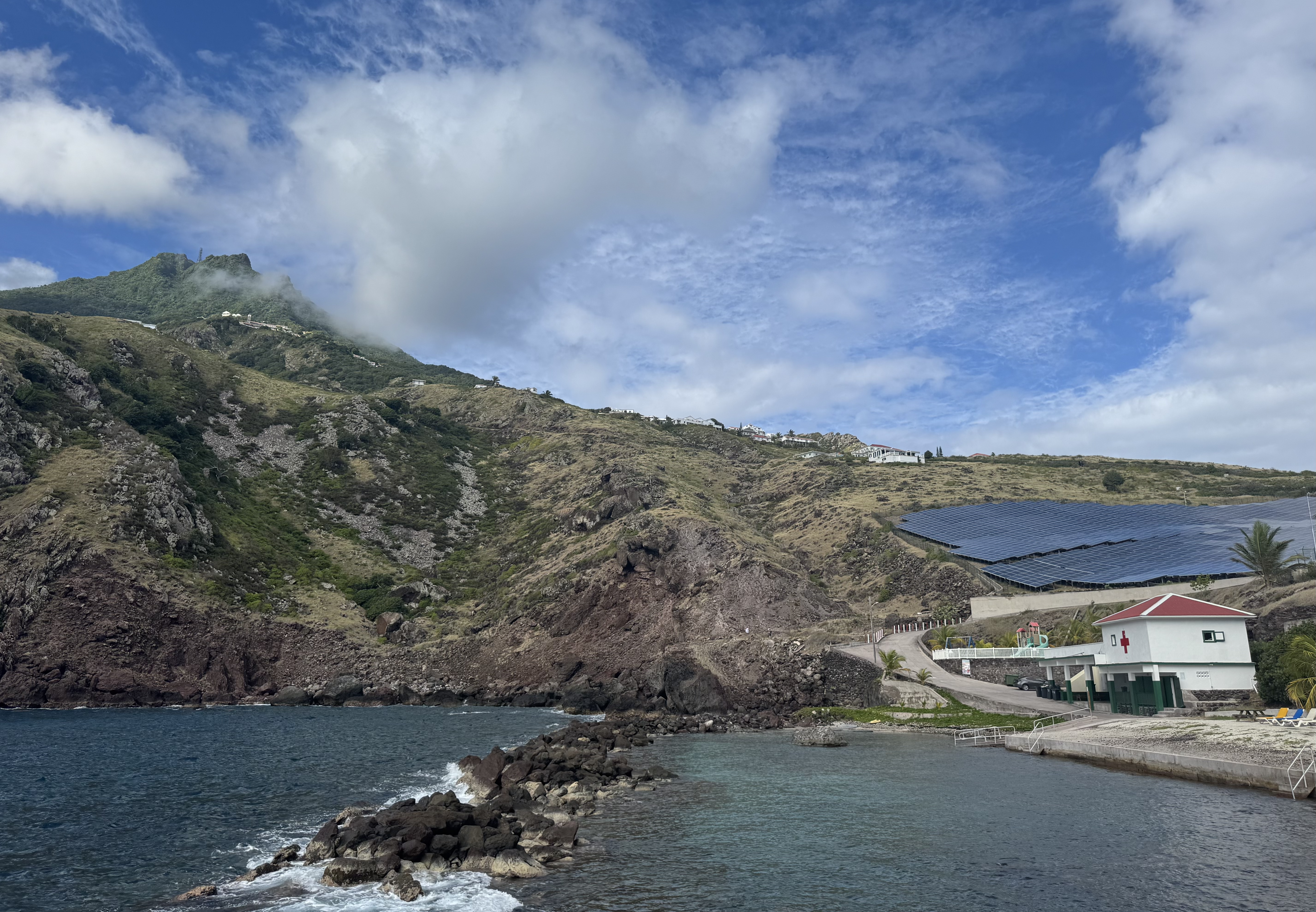
View of Cove Bay's beach area (right), swimming area, and facilities

Cove Bay is equipped with a children's playground area, a kitchen and large covered area for barbecues, a beach area, and public restrooms. The beach area has a few picnic tables, lounge chairs, and hammocks.

Between April and August 2024, Cove Bay underwent major renovations to the facilities and beach area. A concrete retaining wall was constructed on the shoreline. New steps and an extended ramp were constructed to facilitate easier access to the swimming area. Additionally, a rainwater drainage system was put in place, to prevent erosion. Renovation of the children's playground is planned for early 2026.

Cove Bay is not used as a harbour; Saba's harbour is located at Fort Bay.
