= Flat Point Tide Pools =

Natural tidal pools on Saba, Dutch Caribbean

Coordinates: 17°38′38″N 63°13′6″W

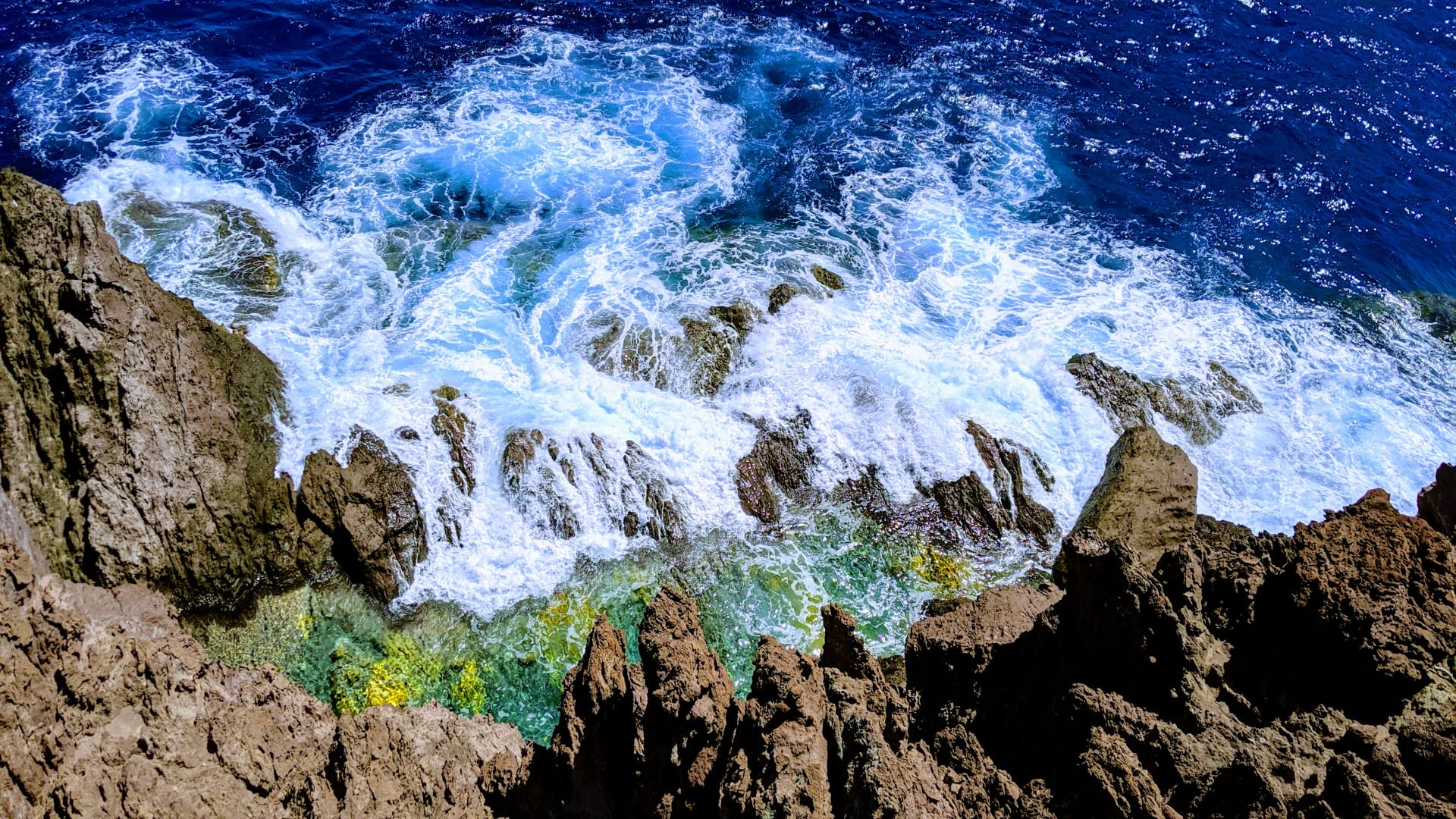
Waves crashing and filling the Flat Point Tide Pools

The Flat Point Tide Pools (or Saba Tide Pools) are located on the coast of Saba, in the Dutch Caribbean. They are located on the Flat Point peninsula Lower Hell's Gate. These tide pools feature large lava rock formations filled with colorful saltwater pools. The site was formed during volcanic activity about 5,000 years ago. A large lava flow went down the northeast side of the island into the ocean, forming the Flat Point peninsula as it cooled. Today the Flat Point Tide Pools are home to diverse marine life, and are a popular hiking location. The site is accessible via the Flat Point Trail below Saba's airport.

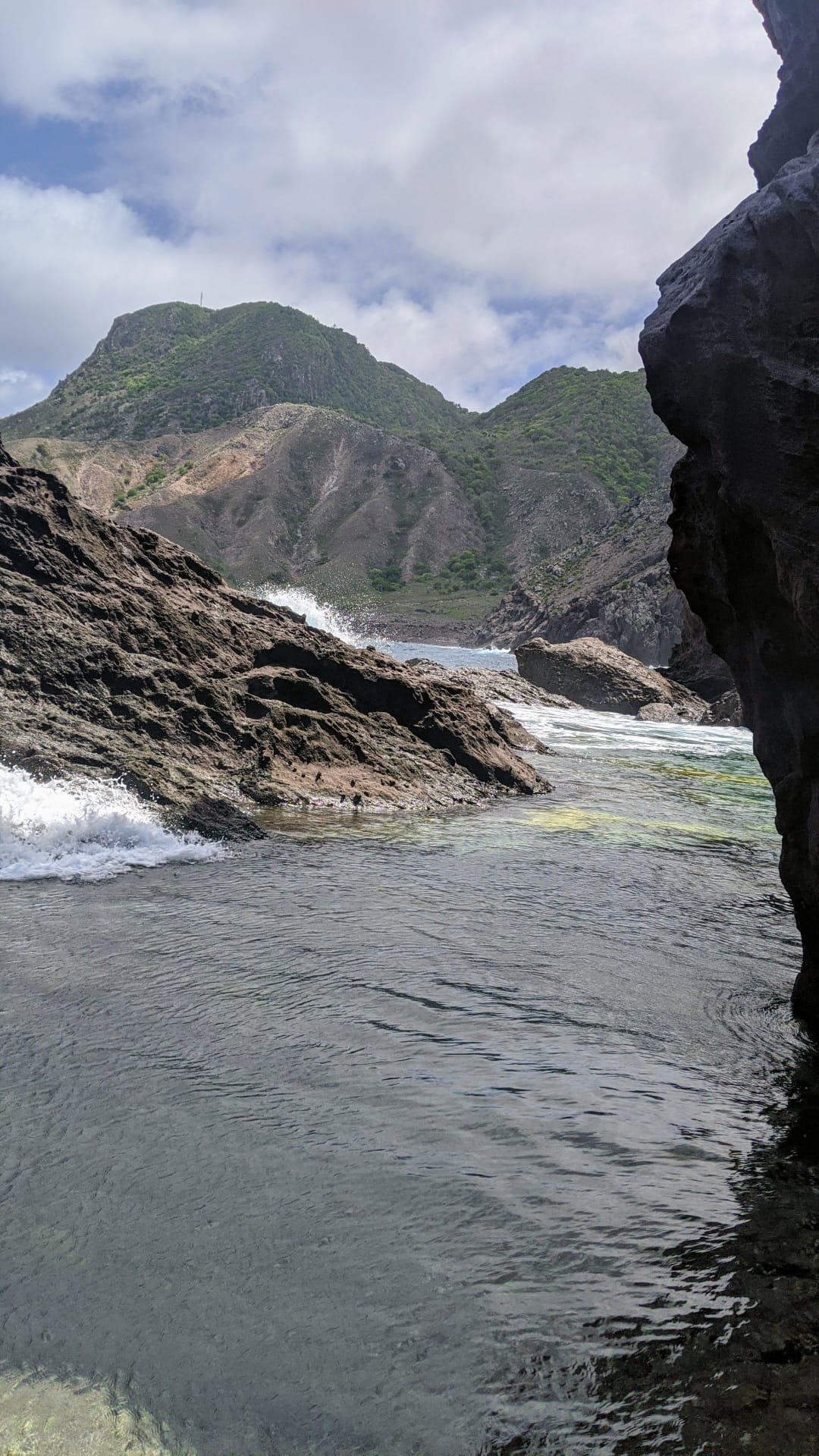
Water filling the Flat Point Tide Pools, with Spring Bay and Booby Hill in the distance

== Hiking ==
The tide pools are a popular hiking location, and can be reached by the Flat Point Trail. The trail access is located on road going from Saba's airport to Cove Bay. The trail passes by the ruins of an indigo boiling house, that was part of a 17th-18th century sugar and indigo plantation (referred to as "Flat Point Plantation" by archeologists). The hike is about 15-25 minutes each way.

== Wildlife ==
The tide pools are home to including small fish, sea urchins, crabs, and sea flora. Off the coast are protected coral reefs that are part of the Saba National Marine Park. Birdwatchers can see numerous bird species in the Flat Point area, including the Common Ground Dove, the Brown Noddy, the Least Sandpiper, and the White-tailed Tropicbird.

== Safety ==
Rip currents can occur in the Flat Point tide pools, especially from November to April. The Saba Conservation Foundation advises hikers visiting the tide pools to be cautious and alert, and to stay safely distanced from the surf. Additionally, the volcanic rocks are jagged and can be sharp.

== Gallery ==
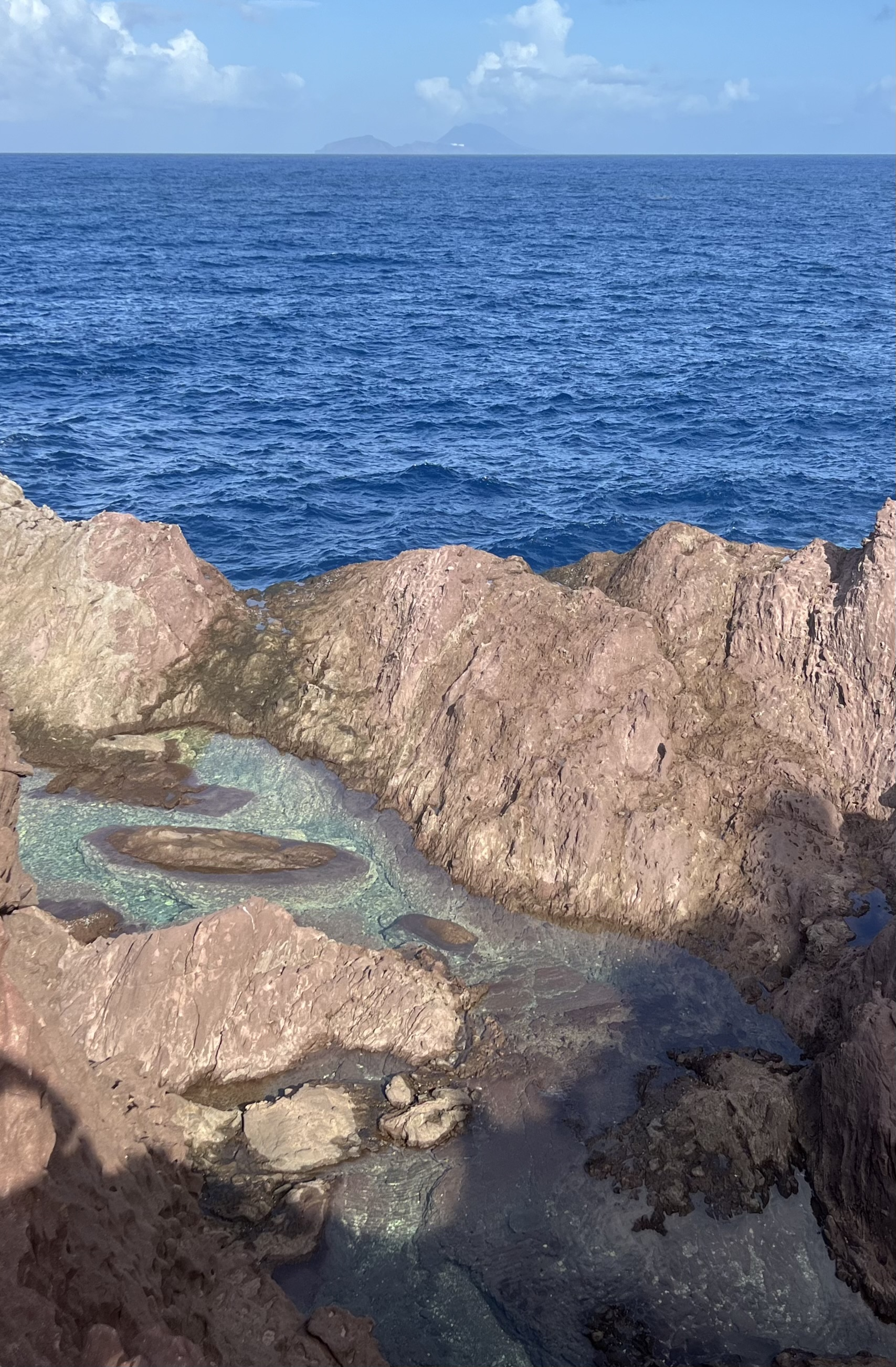
Flat Point Tide Pools, with St. Eustatius in the distance

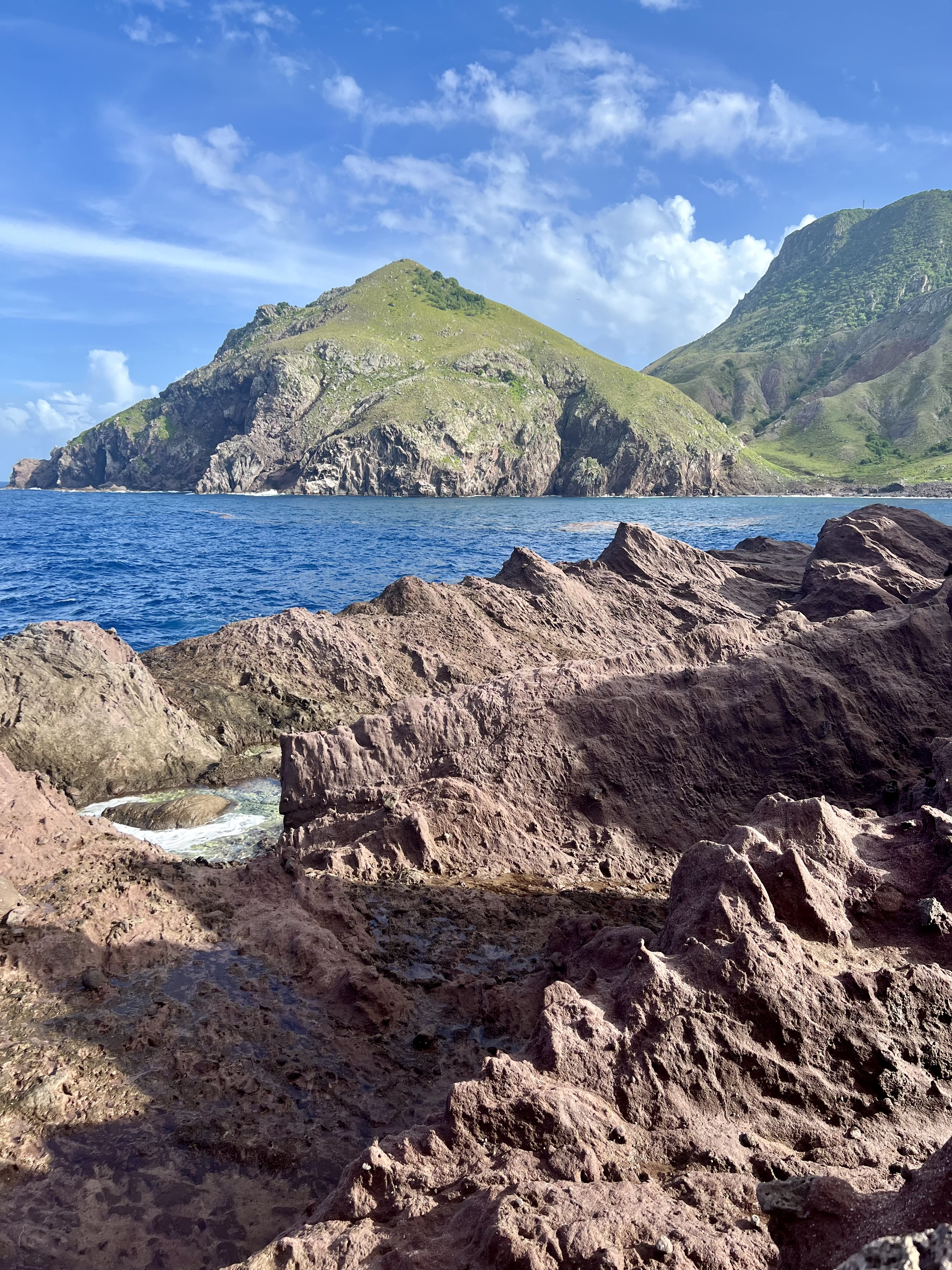
Volcanic rocks of the tide pools, with Old Booby Hill beyond

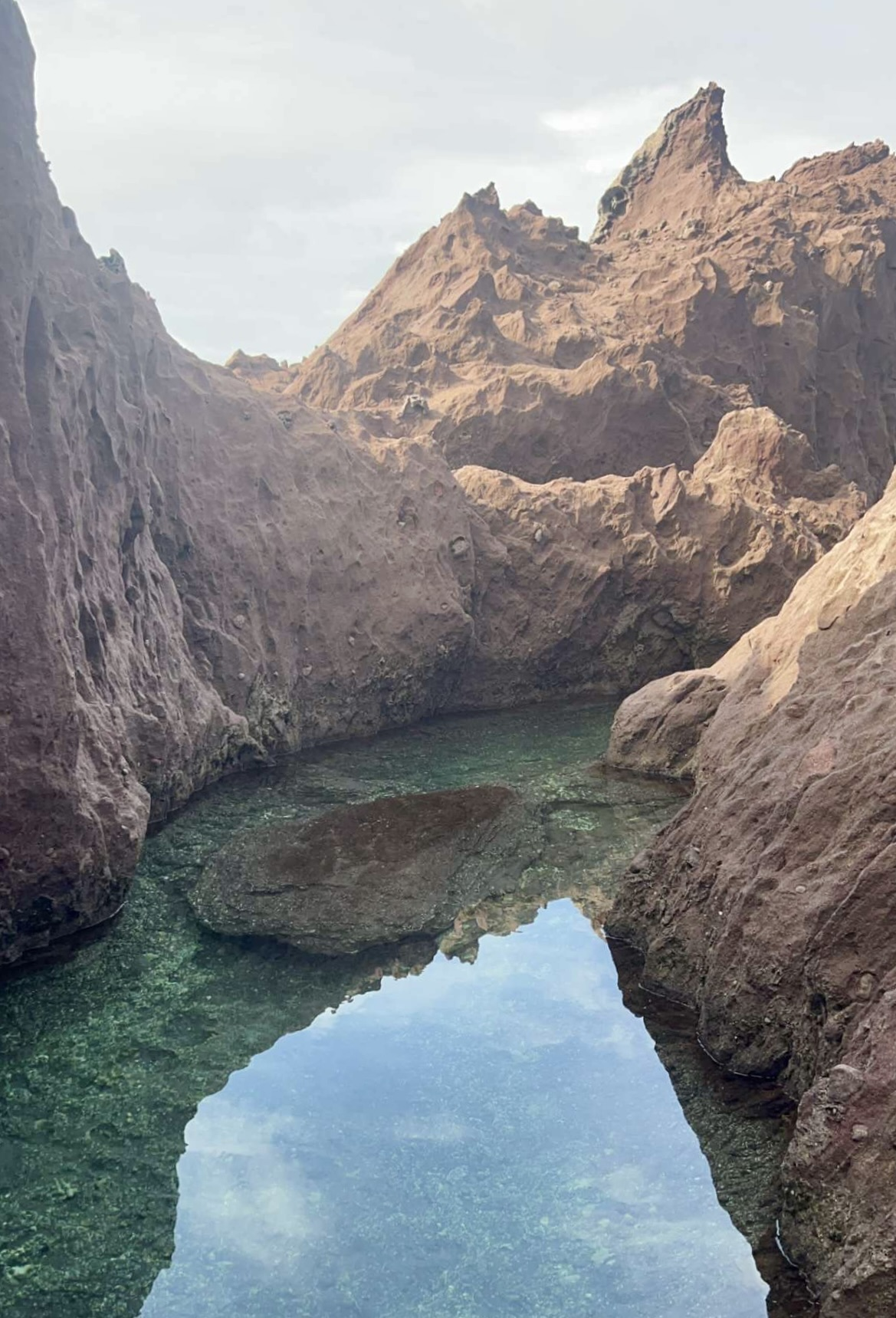
Tide pool surrounded by volcanic rock formations
