= Zion's Hill =

Village in Saba, Dutch Caribbean

- Village
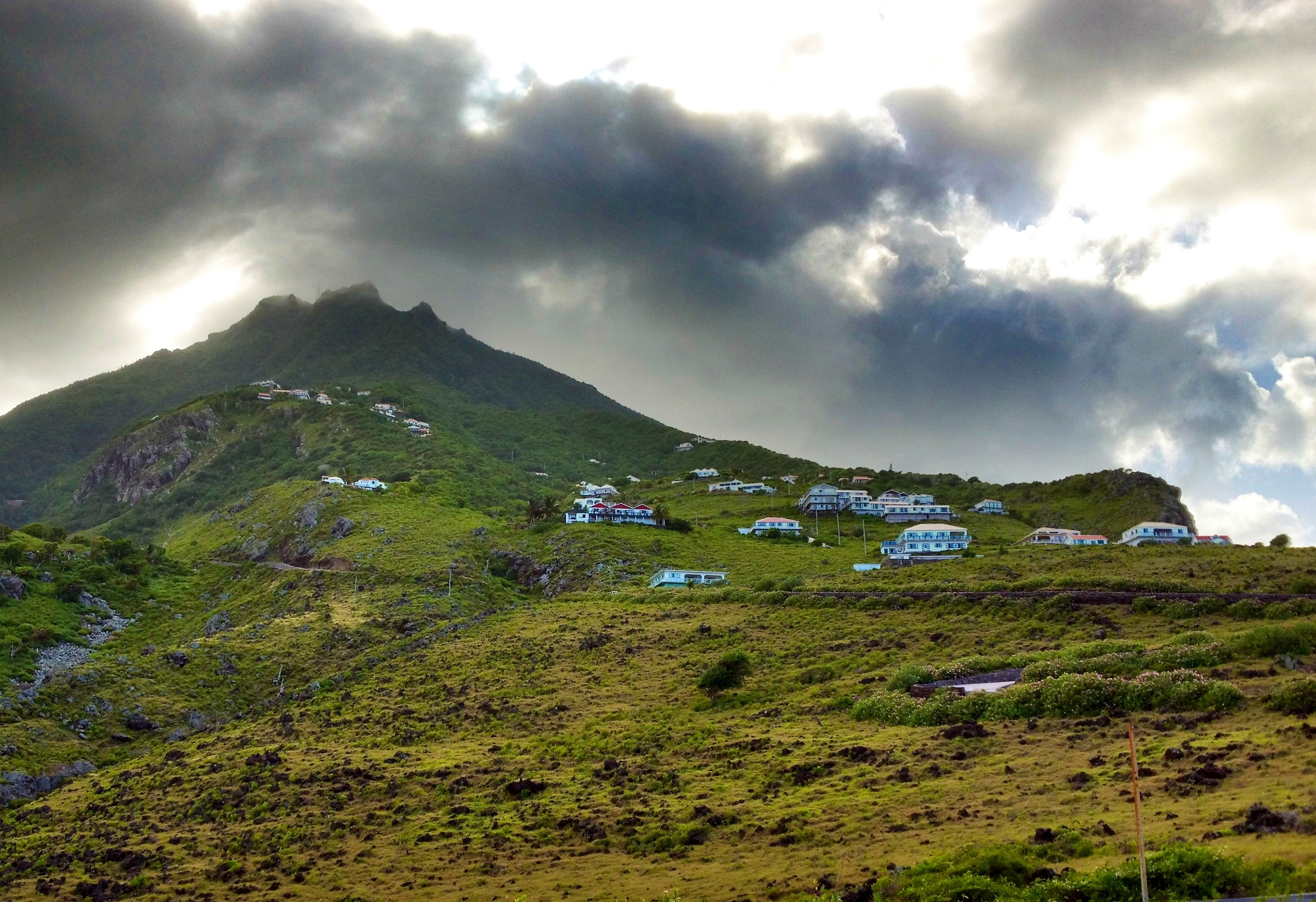
- Hell's Gate

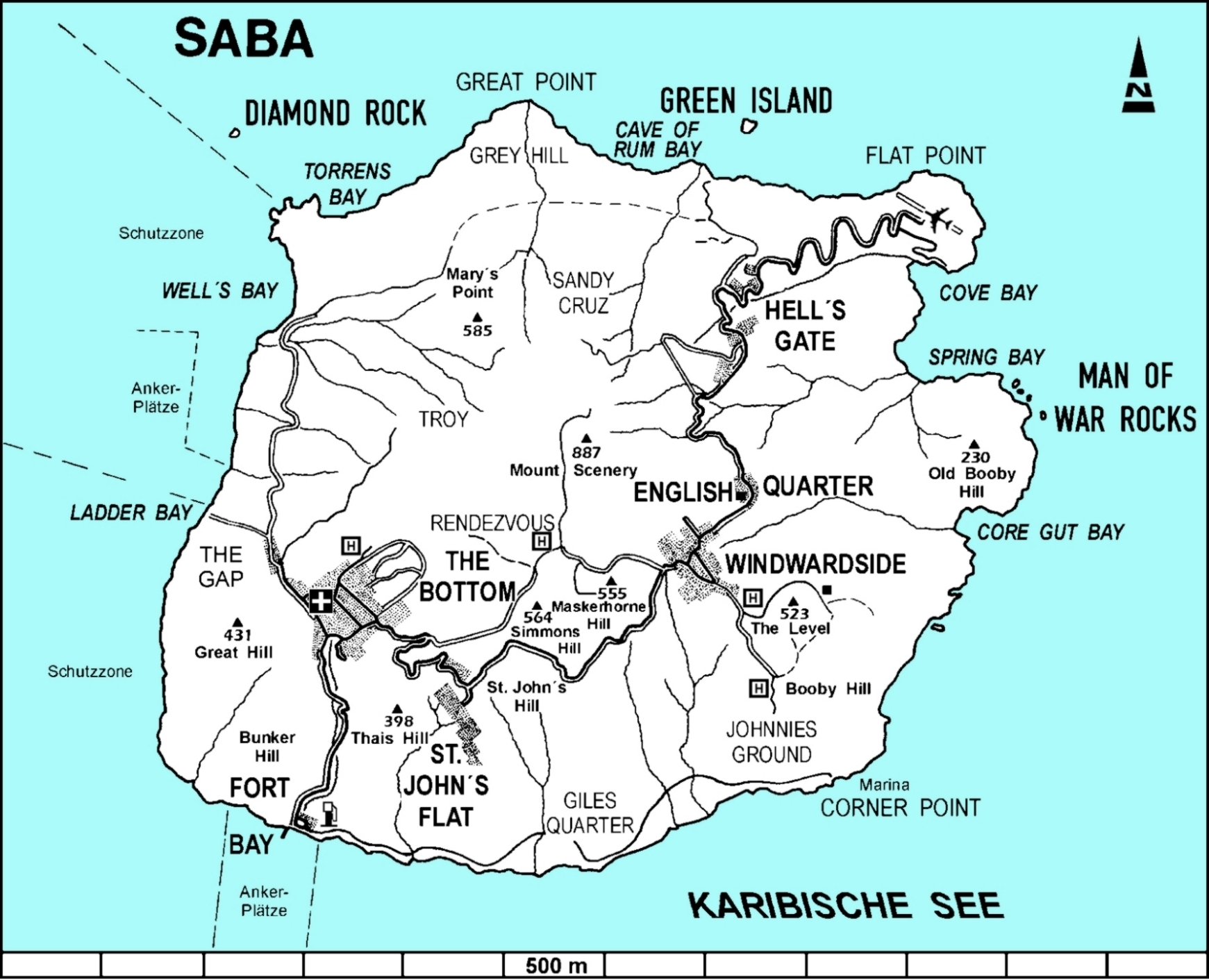
- Map of Saba showing Zion's Hill
- Coordinates: 17°38′35″N 63°13′37″W
- Country: Netherlands
- Public body: Saba
- Elevation: 300/450 m (2.19 ft)

Population (2001)
  - Total: 283
- Time zone: UTC-4 (AST)
- Climate: Aw

Zion's Hill, also known by its former name Hell's Gate, is a town on the Dutch Caribbean island of Saba. Locally, it is divided into Upper Hell's Gate and Lower Hell's Gate.

Upper Hell's Gate is the highest village in the Kingdom of the Netherlands, at an altitude of 450 m (1,480 ft) above sea level. Lower Hell's Gate is located approximately 300 m (980 ft) above sea level. On some maps, Lower Hell's Gate includes Flat Point, location of the Juancho E. Yrausquin Airport and the Flat Point Tide Pools.

== Name ==
Hell's Gate was officially named "Zion's Hill" after complaints from the church forced the island's government to change the name. However, "Hell's Gate" is still commonly used by many Sabans as well as tourists.

== History ==
The first permanent European settlements on Saba began in the 1640s. By the 1860s, Hell's Gate was one of 7 main districts, with The Bottom, St. John's, Windwardside, Booby Hill, Mary's Point (Palmetto Point), and Middle Island. The Hell's Gate district had its own elected head, as did the other districts. In 1865, the population of Hell's Gate was 161.

Throughout the 18th, 19th, and early 20th centuries, most men in Hell's Gate engaged in farming as well as fishing. Some men in Hell's Gate made a living from lime burning. Most women engaged in domestic work in the home, as well as local drawn thread work known as Saba lace. For a time, women in Hell's Gate engaged in hatmaking.

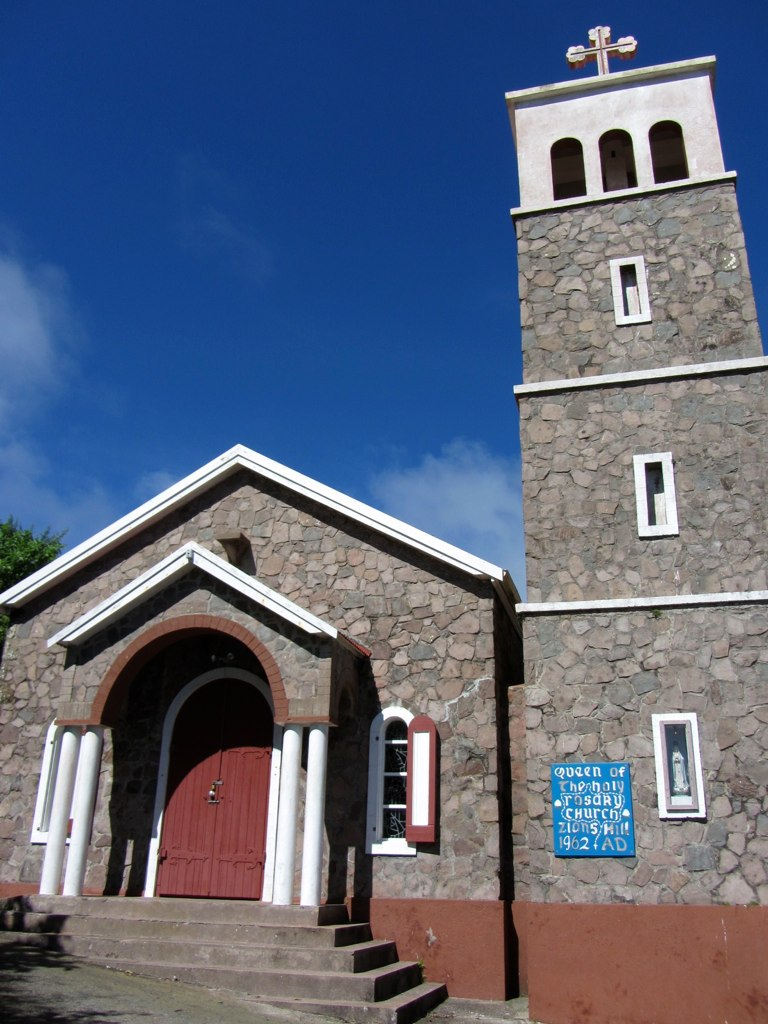
Queen of The Holy Rosary Church

By 1900, Hell's Gate was one of four main villages on Saba, along with The Bottom, St. John's, and Windwardside. In 1911, the Queen of The Holy Rosary Church was built in Hell's Gate. The church was rebuilt in stone in the 1960s.

The 1950s and 1960s were a time of infrustructural milestones for Hell's Gate. In 1958, Saba's primary road, "The Road", was extended to Hell's Gate. Before then, residents of Hell's Gate had to rely on footpaths to reach the closest village, Windwardside. In 1964, public electricity reached Hell's Gate. Until then, the village had relied on gas lamps for streetlights, as well as inside the home.

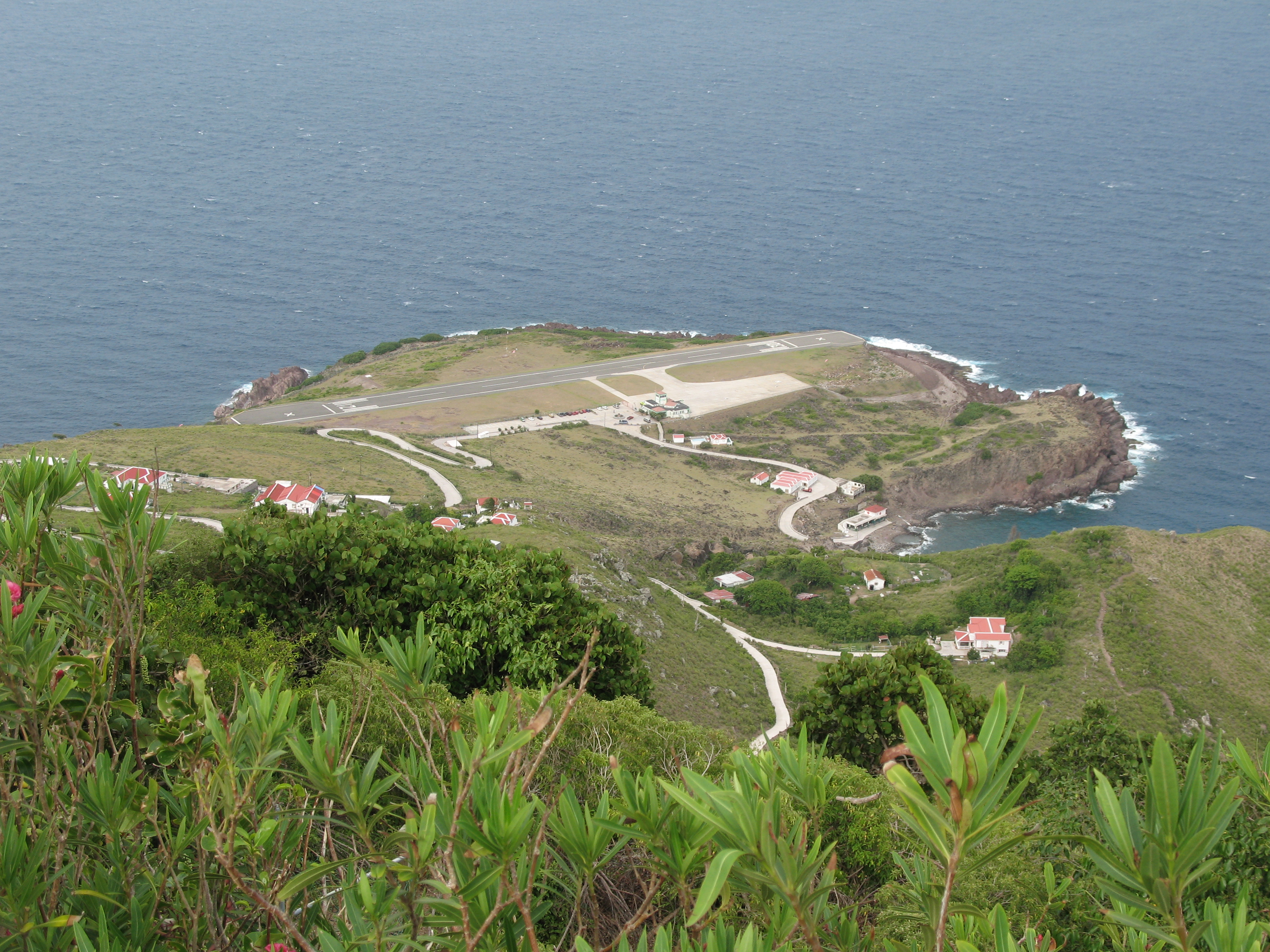
Overlooking Saba's airport and runway

In 1959, Remy de Haenen, made the first landing of an aircraft on the island, at Flat Point, in Lower Hell's Gate. Nearly the entire population of the island was in attendance. In 1963, the Juancho E. Yrausquin Airport airport officially began service on Flat Point. "The Road" was extended to the airport that year. The airport's runway is widely acknowledged as the shortest commercial runway in the world, with a length of 400 m (1,312 ft).

The early- to mid- 1900s saw extensive emigration from Saba. By 1972, the populations of the three other villages had decreased significantly. However, in Hell's Gate, the population had increased to 206 inhabitants. In the 1970s, a microwave transmitter was built in Hell's Gate. Construction was carried out by the West Indies Television Network, and the transmitter linked to television studios in St. Maarten.

In 2019, solar parks in Hell's Gate (adjacent to the airport) and The Bottom became operational. For up to 10 hours a day, the entire island of Saba is powered by solar energy from these two solar parks and their battery storage.

== Main sights ==
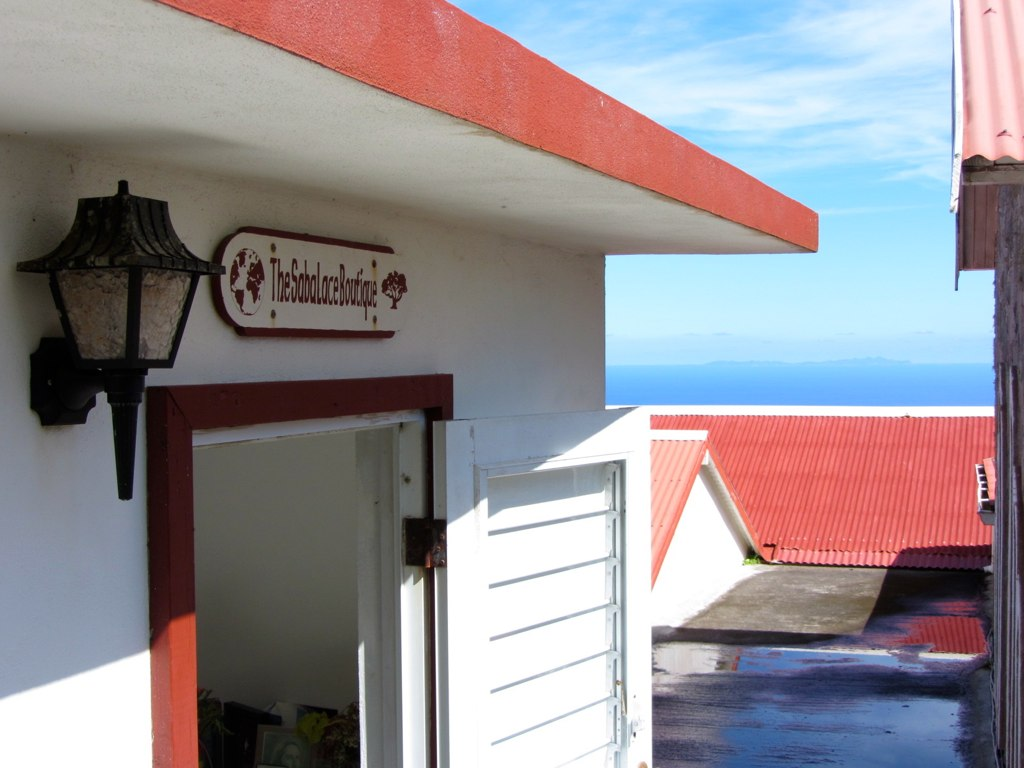
The Saba Lace Boutique in Hell's Gate

Hell's Gate is home to Queen of The Holy Rosary Church, a stone structure built in 1962, in place of its original wooden structure dating back to 1911. It is also home to the a community center and "Lace Boutique" where visitors can purchase locally made Saba lace and Saba spice, a locally brewed rum drink.

The Neighborhood, English Quarter belongs to the town.

=== Hiking trails ===
Upper Hell's Gate is a trailhead for the Sandy Cruz Trail, which ends in The Bottom. The trail takes roughly 2 hours to complete (2.5 if begun in The Bottom), and has views of Diamond Rock and the northern coastline.

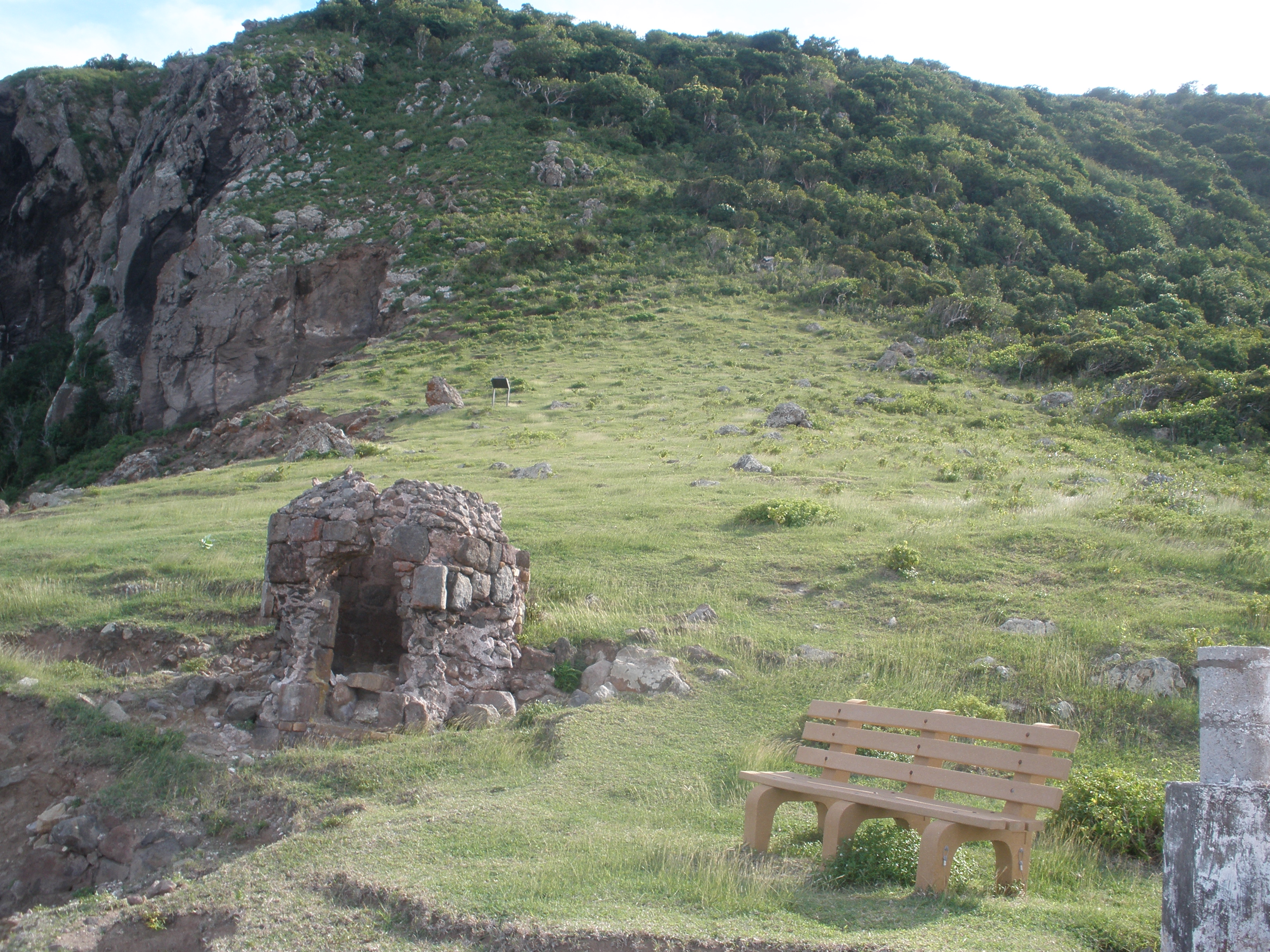
Historic sulfur oven, seen on the Sulfur Mine Trail

Lower Hell's Gate is home to the McNish Sulfur Mine, a now-closed sulfur mine where visitors may explore with caution. It can be reached via the Sulphur Mine Trail, which begins between Upper and Lower Hell's gate. It is part of Saba's Terrestrial Park. The trail has views of Green Island, the ocean, cliffs, and the airport. Lower Hell's Gate is also the main trailhead for the North Coast Trail. The trail takes roughly 3.5 hours to complete and has views of Saba's northern coastline and the ruins of the historic Mary's Point village.

Flat Point is the main trailhead for the Flat Point Trail. The hike leads to the Flat Point Tide Pools, and is about 15–25 minutes each way. The trail passes by the ruins of an indigo boiling house from a 17th-18th century plantation. The trail access is located between the airport and Cove Bay. Hikers are cautioned about rip currents and sharp rocks.

== Transport ==
Zion's Hill is the first town one reaches after leaving the Juancho E. Yrausquin Airport. They can travel the island by The Road.

== Gallery ==
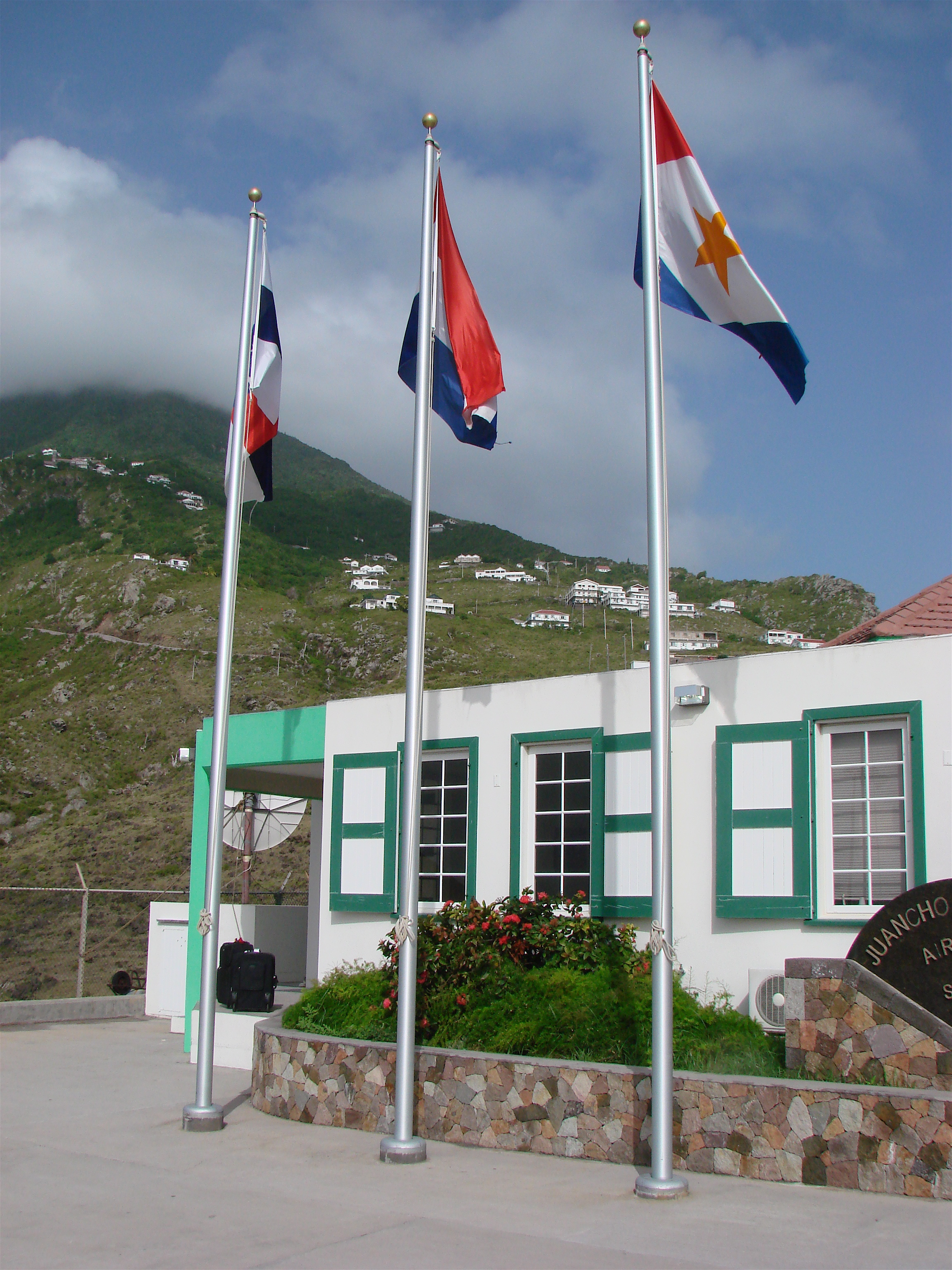
Saba's airport, with Hell's Gate on the mountain behind it

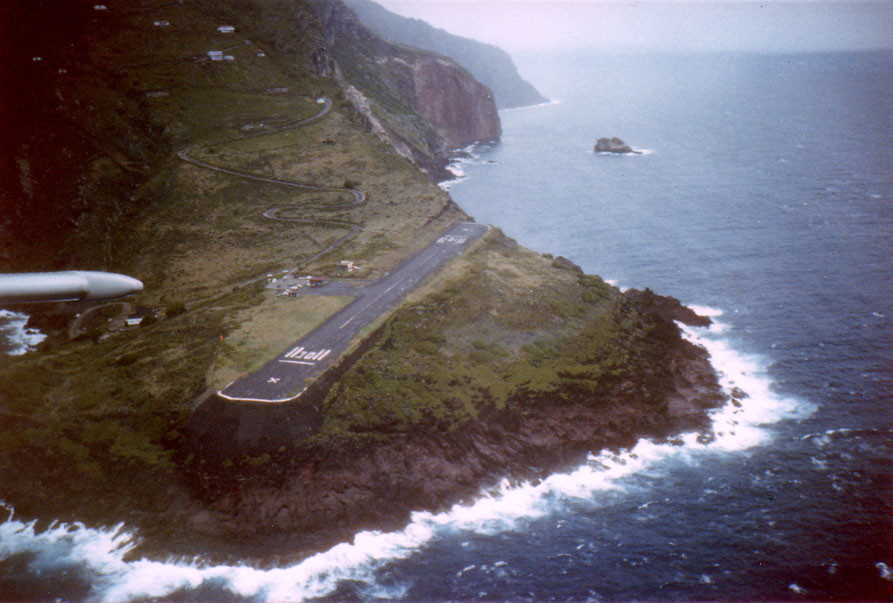
Saba's airport on Flat Point, with road winding up through Lower Hell's Gate

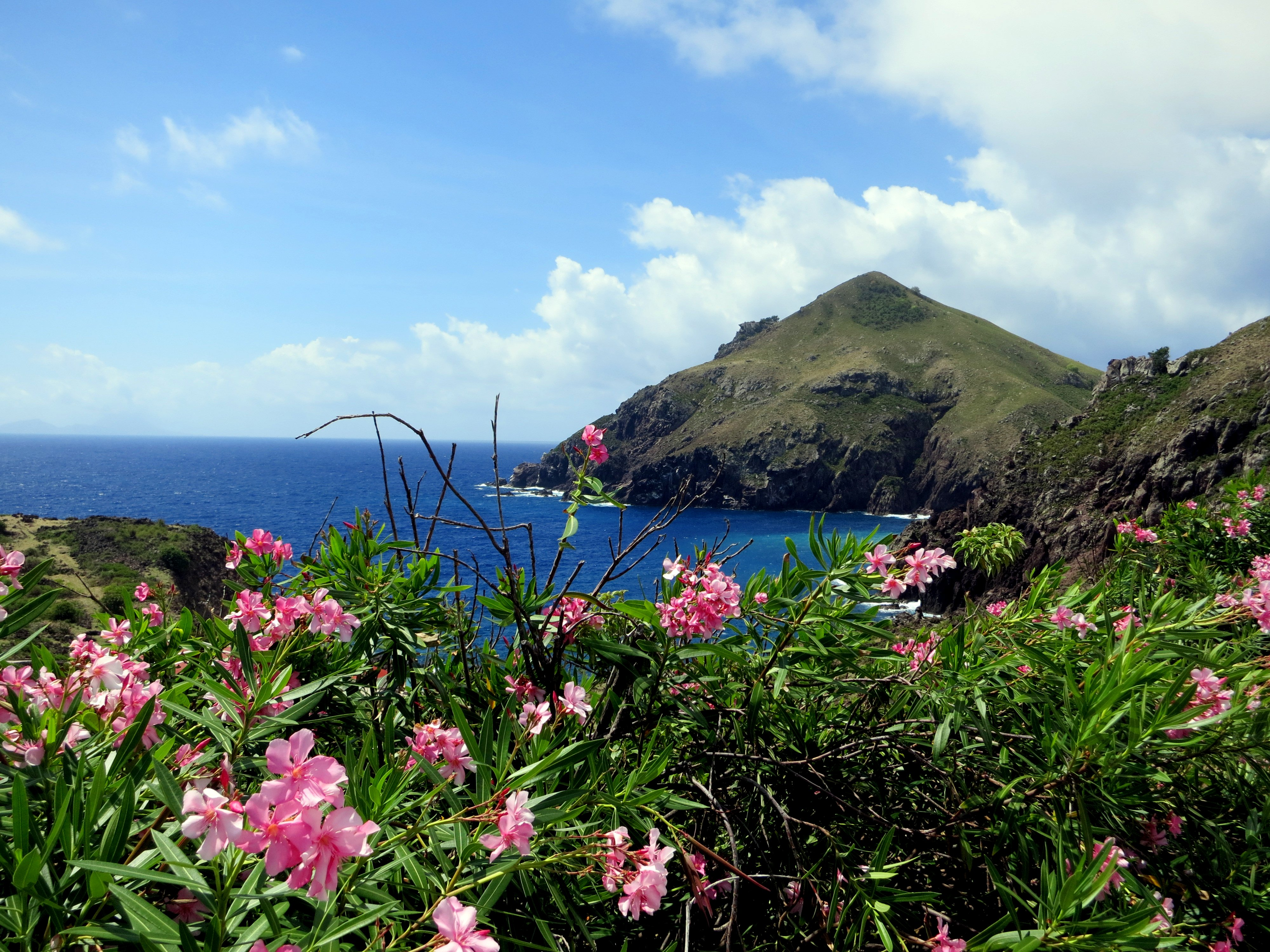
Cove Bay, as seen from Lower Hell's Gate

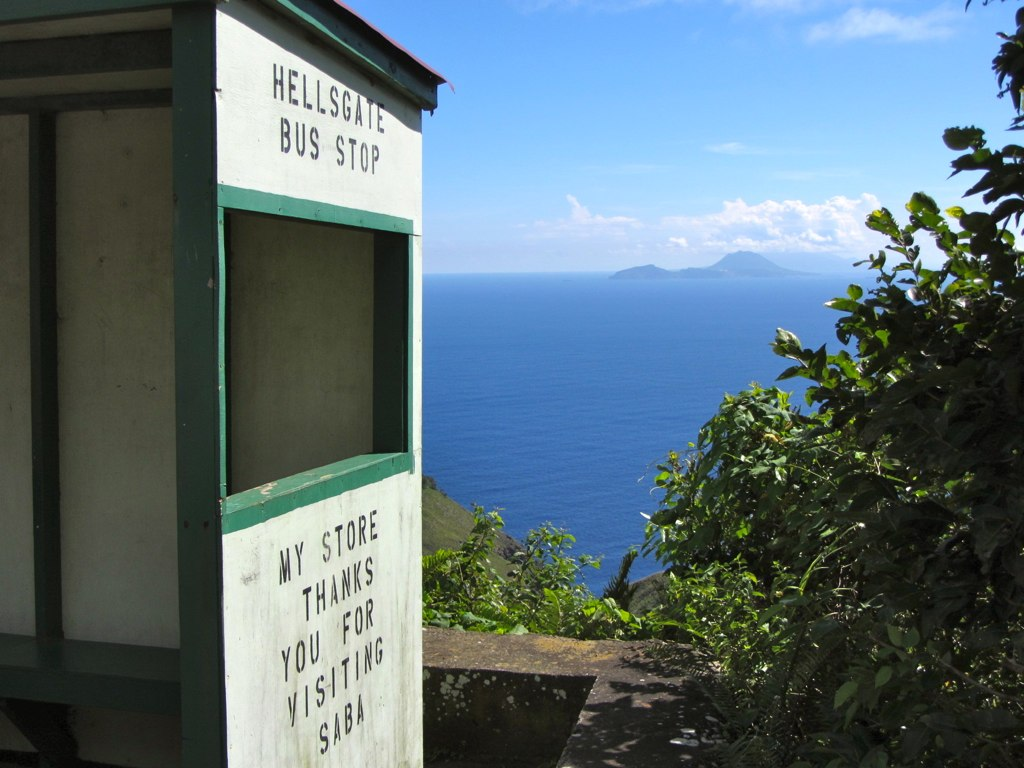
Bus stop in Upper Hell's Gate, on "The Road"

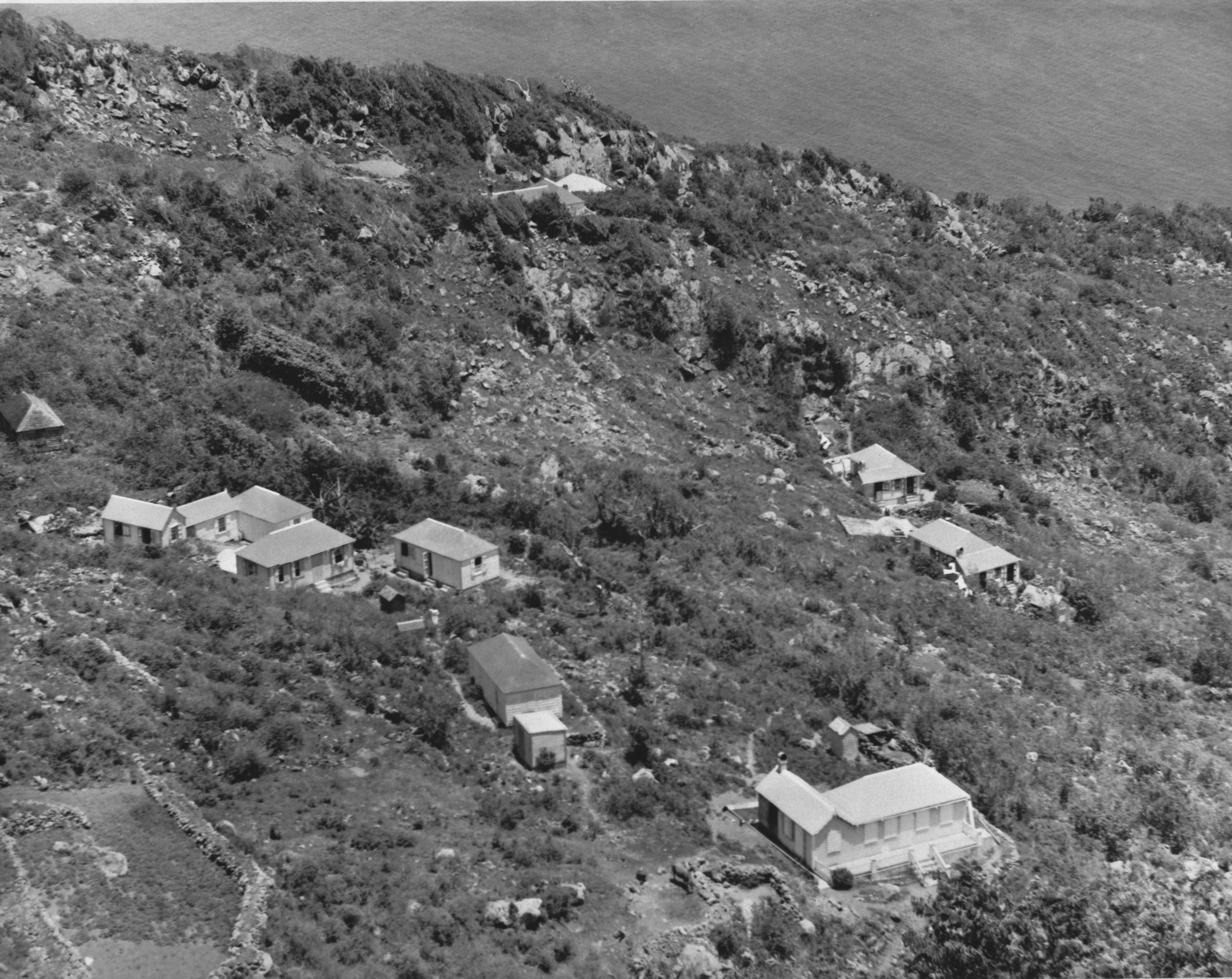
Houses in Lower Hell's Gate, in the 1940s

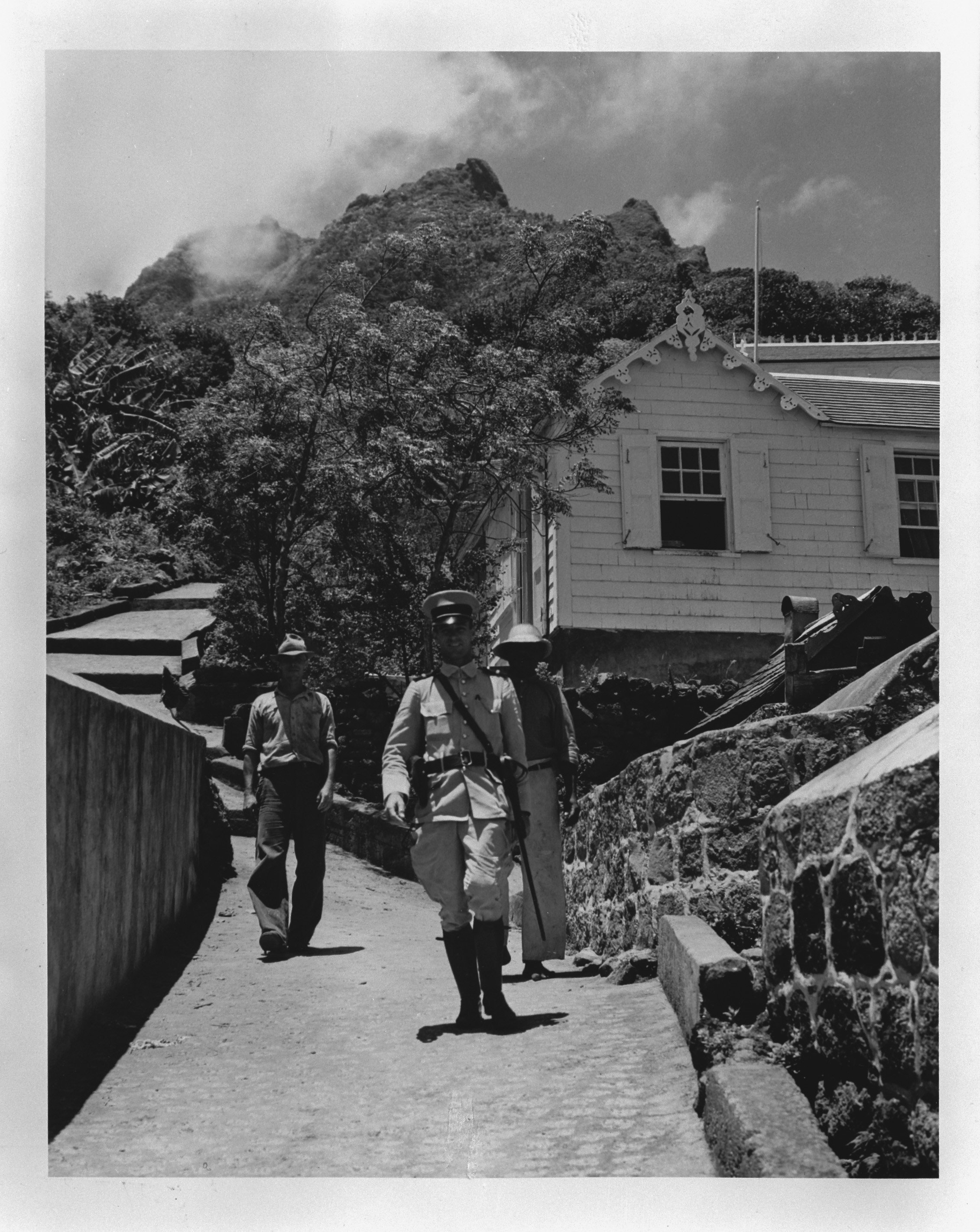
A sergeant walking a paved path in Hell's Gate, in the 1940s

== See also ==
- Mount Scenery
