= Flat Point =

Peninsula on Saba, Dutch Caribbean

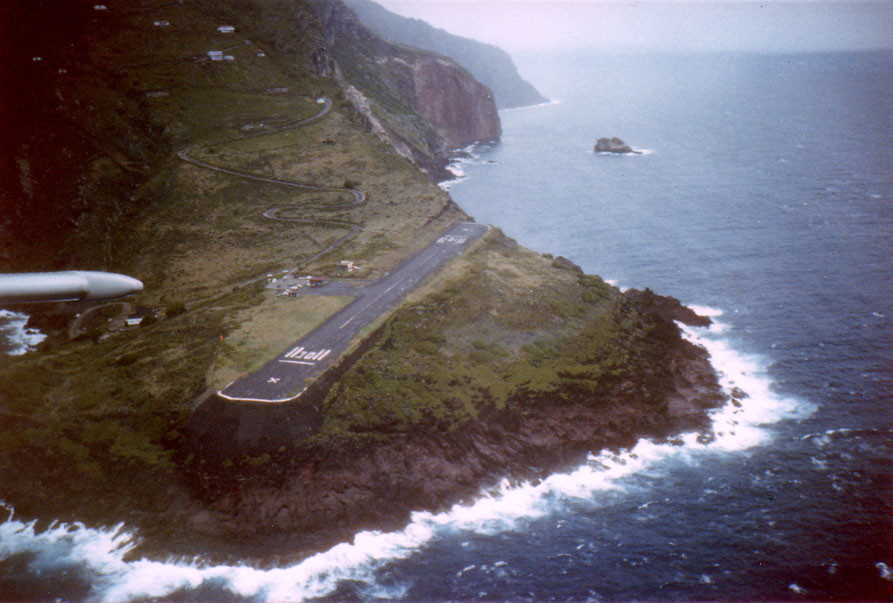
- View of Flat Point from an airplane

- Location on Saba

Geography
- Location: Saba, Dutch Caribbean
- Coordinates: 17°38′39″N 63°13′10″W

Flat Point (or Flat Point Peninsula) is an area on the northeastern coast of Saba, an island in the Dutch Caribbean. It is located in the lower part of the Hell's Gate village, known as Lower Hell's Gate. Flat Point is the location of Juancho E. Yrausquin Airport, the Tide Pools, ruins of a 17th-18th century sugar and indigo plantation, and Cove Bay.

== History ==
Flat Point was formed during volcanic activity about 5,000 years ago. A large lava flow flowed down the northeast side of the island into the ocean, forming the Flat Point peninsula as it cooled. Humans would not occupy the area for at least another 3,000 years. Flat Point was occupied by Amerindians sometime between 400 A.D. and 800 A.D. Archeological surveys carried out by Ryan Espersen uncovered pre-Columbian ceramics and conch shell adzes.

From the 1650s through the 1770s, Flat Point was the site of a sugar and indigo plantation (referred to as "Flat Point Plantation" by archeologists). The plantation was the site of at least one indigo boiling house, two wells, and two domestic structures for enslaved Africans. The Great Hurricane of 1780 caused extensive damage to the plantation and it was not rebuilt. In 1781, Flat Point may have been the landing point for the British during their capture of Saba, under the command of Admiral George Brydges Rodney. On some maps, Flat Point is called “Rodney’s Head”.

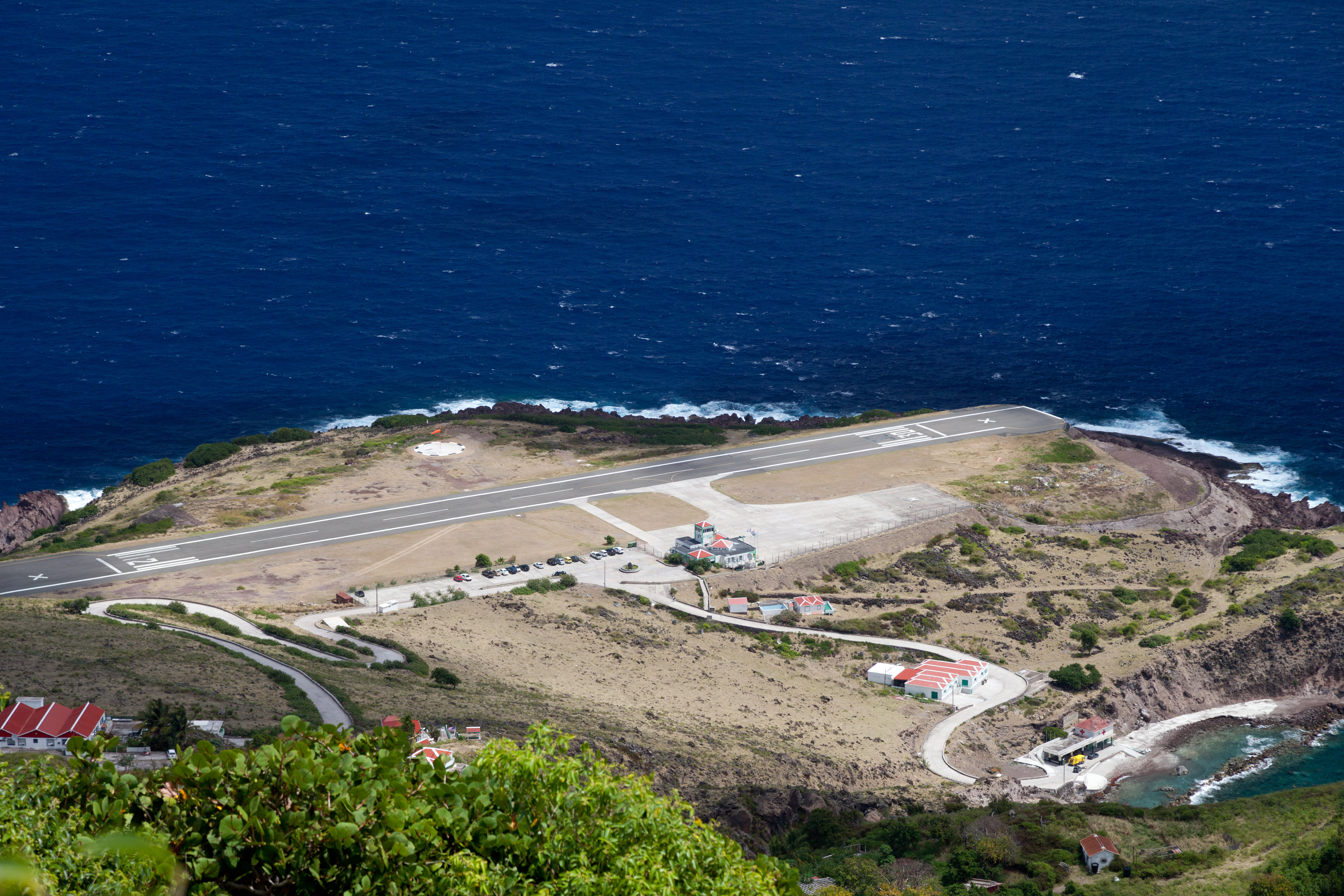
View of Flat Point from Hell's Gate. Visible are Saba's airport and runway, and Cove Bay (bottom right).

On February 9, 1959, Remy de Haenen made the first landing of an aircraft on the island of Saba, on Flat Point. Nearly the entire population of the island was in attendance for the landing. In the 1960s, construction of an airport at Flat Point began, as Flat Point is one of the only level areas on the entire island. On July 24, 1963, Saba's airport, Juancho E. Yrausquin Airport, officially began service. Stretching across Flat Point, the airport's runway is widely acknowledged as the shortest commercial runway in the world, with a length of 400 m (1,312 ft).

== Nature ==
=== Geology ===
Flat Point was created by a large (basaltic andesite or andesitic) lava flow, stretching from above Upper Hell's Gate down into the ocean. Lava rock formations from this flow can be seen in the Flat Point Tide Pools. These tide pools are located below the airport, and feature large lava rock formations filled with colorful saltwater pools.

=== Flora and fauna ===
Vegetation on Flat Point consists mostly of grasses, cacti, and succulents, due to the dry conditions and thin soil resulting from continuous coastal winds. These plants include Crotons flavens L., Kalanchoe pinnata, Pilosocereus lanuginosis, Tabebuia heterophylla, and Coccoloba uvifera. The Flat Point Tide Pools are home to diverse marine life, including small fish, sea urchins, crabs, and sea flora. Off the coast of Flat Point are protected coral reefs that are part of the Saba National Marine Park.

Birdwatchers can see numerous bird species at Flat Point, including the Common Ground Dove (Columbigallina passerina nigrirostris), the Brown Noddy (Anous stolidus stolidus), and the Least Sandpiper (Calidris minutilla). Flat Point is a nesting site for the White-tailed Tropicbird (Phaeton lepturus catesbyi; also called the Yellow-billed Tropicbird).

=== Hiking ===
Flat point has one hiking trail: the Flat Point Trail. The hike is an out-and-back trail extending to the Flat Point Tide Pools, about 15–25 minutes each way. The trail passes by the ruins of the indigo boiling house of the so-called Flat Point Plantation. The trail access is located on the road going from Saba's airport to Cove Bay. Hikers are cautioned about rip currents (especially from November to April) and sharp rocks when exploring the tide pools.

== Gallery ==
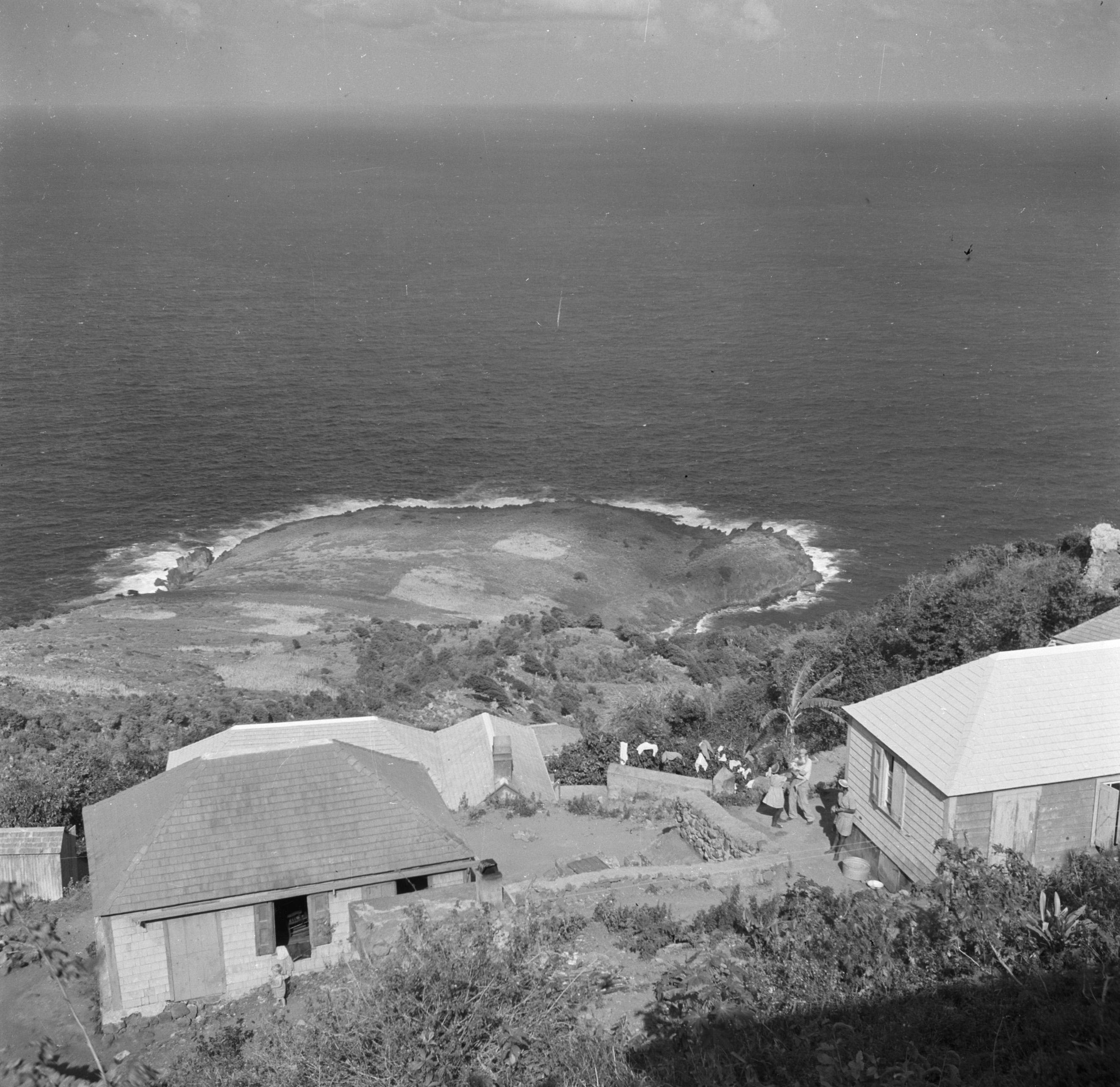
Photo of Flat Point before construction of airport

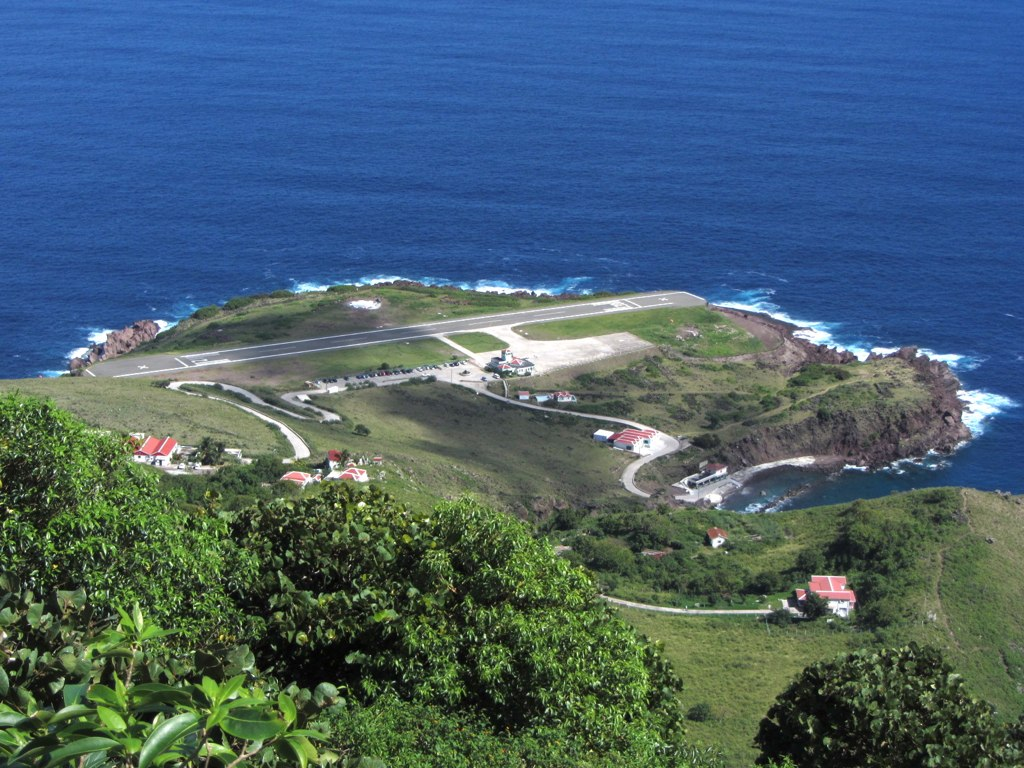
Photo of Flat Point after construction of airport

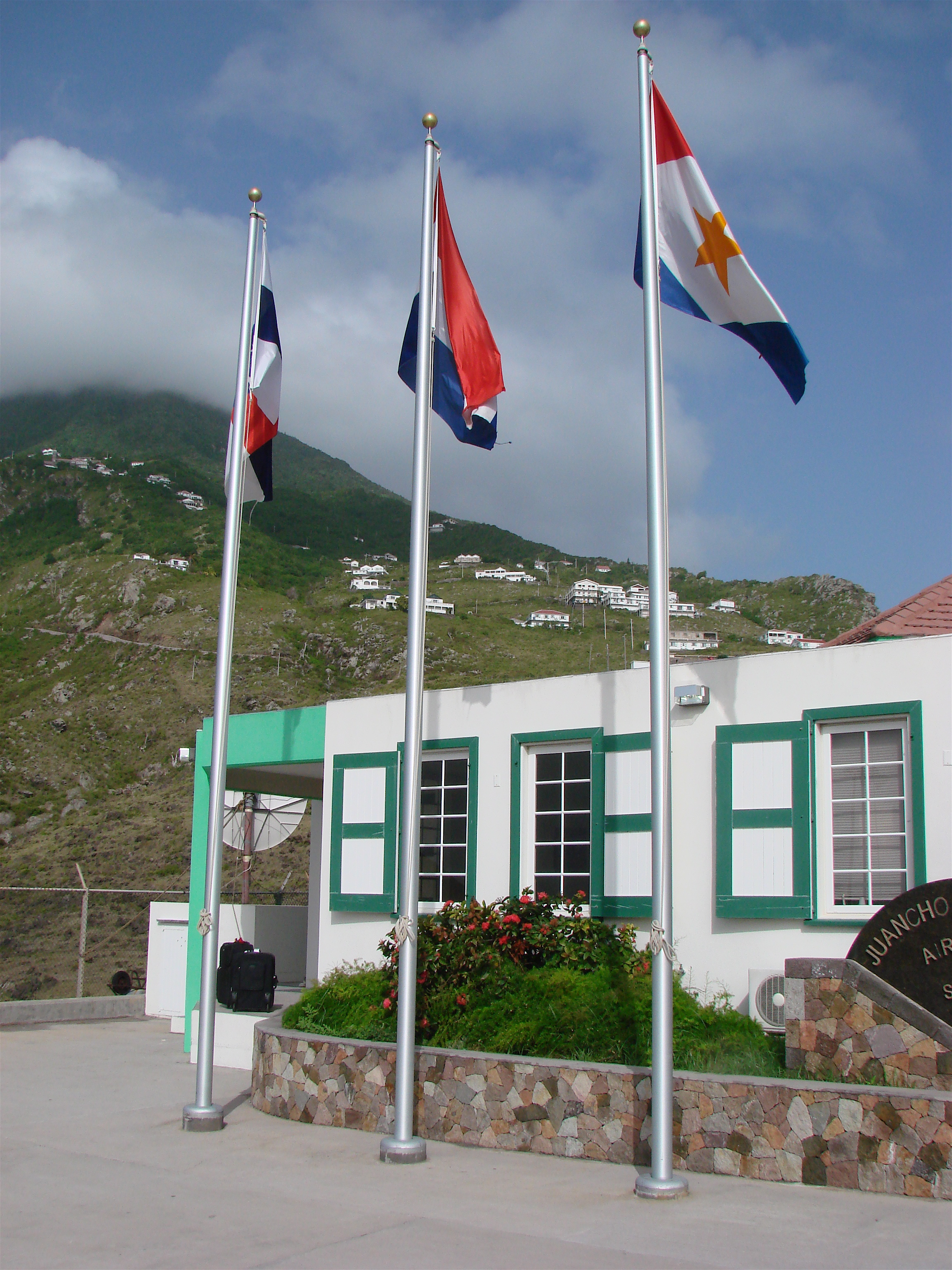
Saba's airport, Juancho E. Yrausquin Airport

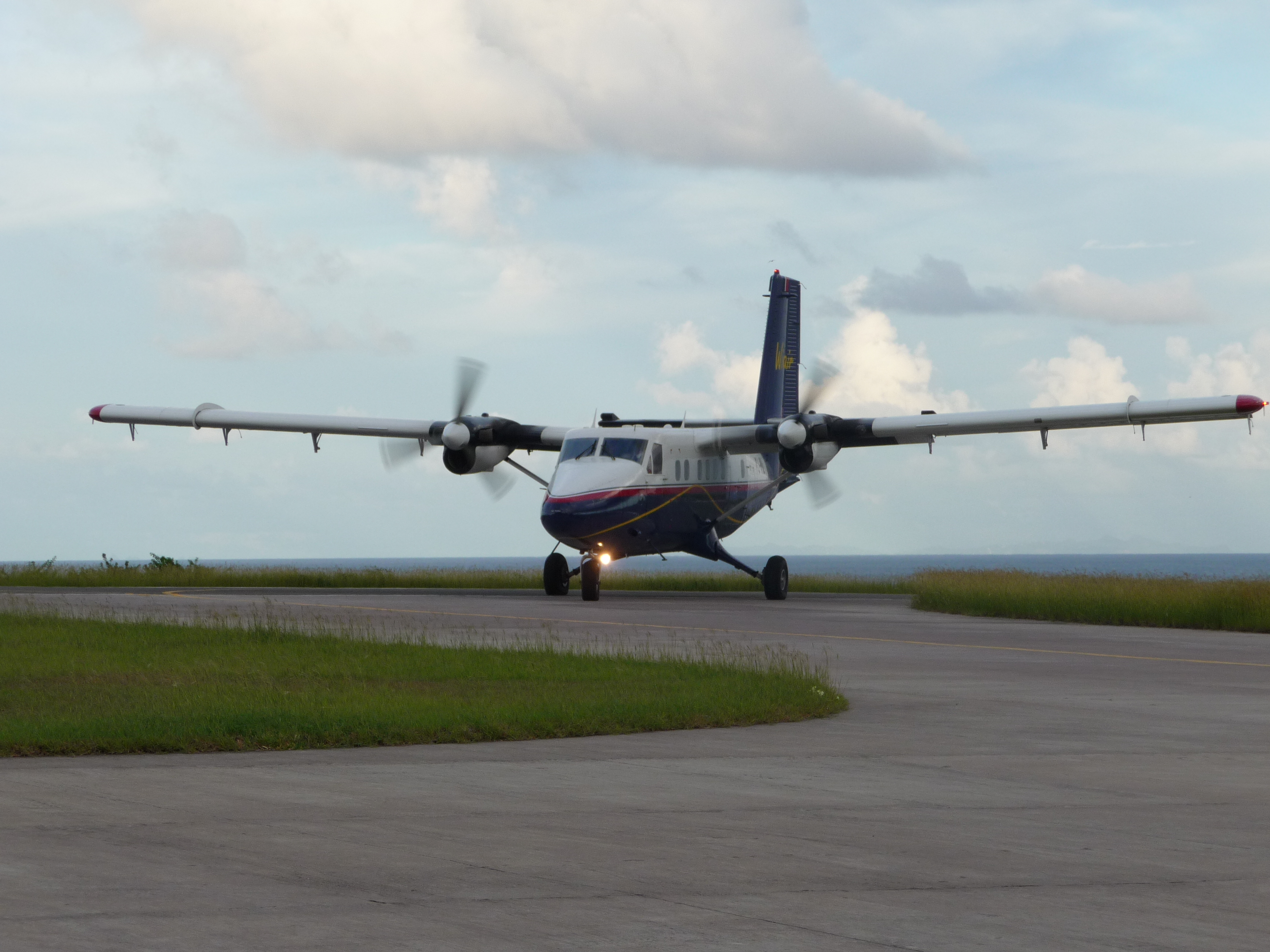
Propeller plane preparing for takeoff from Flat Point

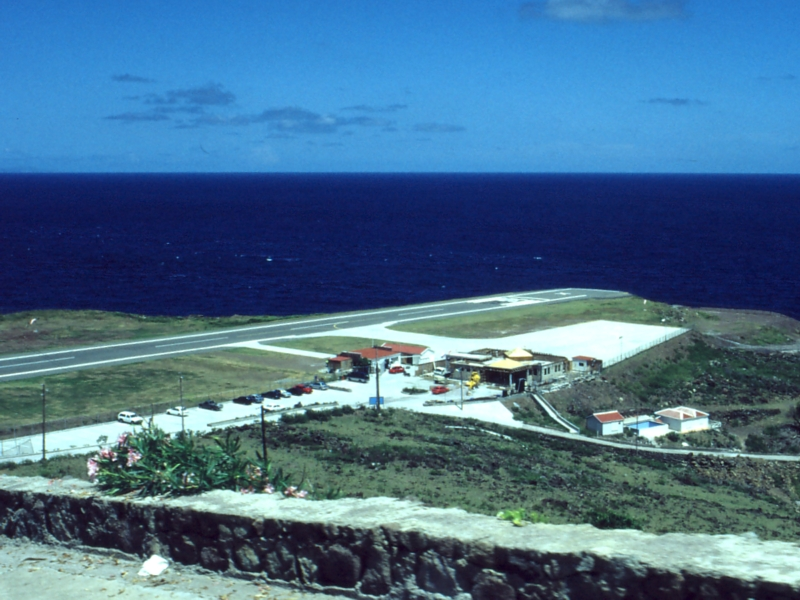
Saba's runway on Flat Point
