= Juancho E. Yrausquin Airport =

Airport on Saba, Dutch Caribbean, Netherlands

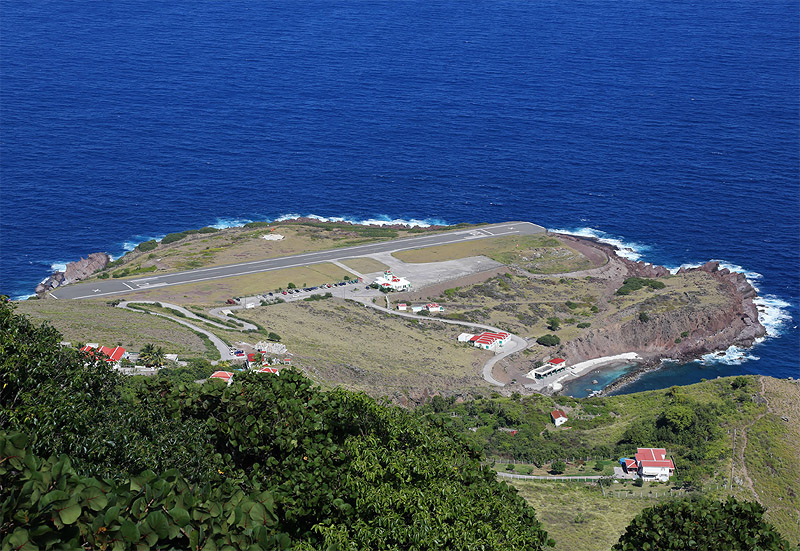
- Saba airport, 2013
- IATA: SAB; ICAO: TNCS

Summary
- Airport type: Public
- Operator: Winair
- Serves: Saba
- Location: Saba, Caribbean Netherlands
- Elevation AMSL: 60 ft (18 m)
- Coordinates: 17°38′44″N 063°13′14″W

Map
- Location in the Caribbean Netherlands

Runways
Direction	Length		Surface
Direction	m	ft	Surface
12/30	400	1,312	Paved

Statistics (2016)
- Passenger movements: 69,896 ▲18%
- Aircraft movements: 986 ▲9%

Juancho E. Yrausquin Airport (IATA: SAB, ICAO: TNCS) is an airport on the Dutch Caribbean island of Saba, Netherlands. Its runway is widely acknowledged as the shortest commercial runway in the world, with a length of 400 m (1,312 ft).

== Overview ==
The airport, named after the Aruban Minister Juancho Yrausquin, has the shortest commercial runway in the world, only 400 metres (1,312 ft) long, flanked on one side by high hills, with cliffs that drop into the sea at both ends. The airport is closed to jet traffic, but regional airline propeller aircraft are able to land there under waivers from the Netherlands Antilles' Civil Aviation Authority. The most common aircraft to land there are the de Havilland Canada DHC-6 Twin Otter and Britten-Norman BN-2 Islander, due to their STOL (short takeoff and landing) capabilities.

== History ==
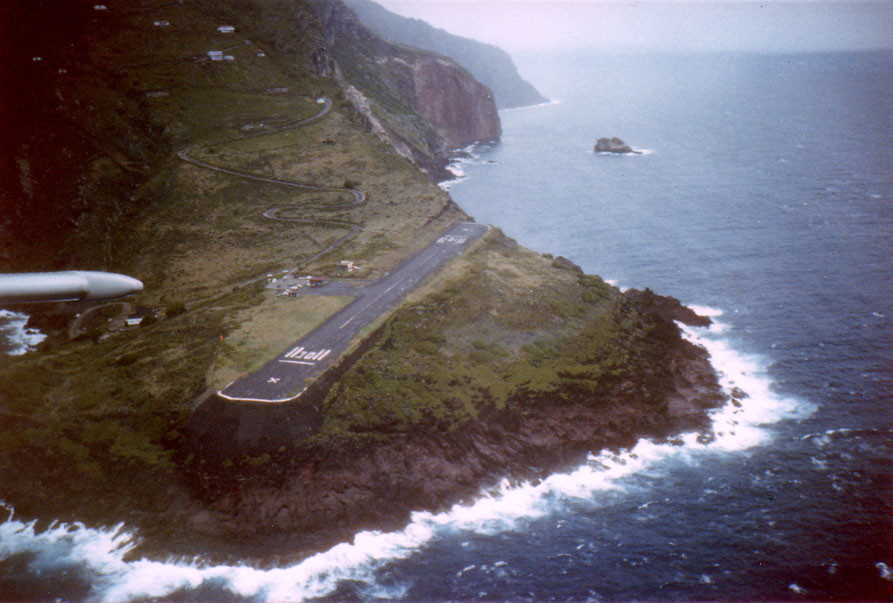
Saba airport, 1997

The idea of building an airport on Saba is credited to Remy de Haenen, who brought the idea to the Saba Economic Council along with a contractor named Jacques Deldevert. De Haenen had previously made several landings of a Vought-Sikorsky OS2U seaplane off Fort Bay harbor as early as 1946. After surveying the island by air, de Haenen suggested then-privately owned Flat Point as the site for the airport. The land was cleared and graded in only a couple of weeks. On 9 February 1959, De Haenen made the first landing of an aircraft on the island, with nearly the entire population of the island in attendance.

After that first landing, De Haenen was prohibited from making further landings on the island, and there were no flights to or from Saba for several years. In the lead-up to the 1962 parliamentary elections, the lack of an airport on the island became a big issue. Sint Maarten politician Claude Wathey, who also represented Saba in the Parliament of the Netherlands Antilles, and Aruban politician Juancho Irausquin, who was at the time Minister of Finance for the Netherlands Antilles, supported the construction of an airport. The Dutch government made 600,000 guilders available to build it as part of a larger three-year plan for the Windward Islands. Irausquin told friends that during a harrowing voyage to Saba by sloop in 1960, he promised to look for funds to build an airport on the island if his life was spared.

The company contracted to build the airport was owned by Wathey's brother Chester, as well as Jacques Deldevert. On 22 March 1962, while the airport was under construction, three helicopters from the Dutch aircraft carrier HNLMS Karel Doorman landed there, marking the second time aircraft had landed on the island. Then, on 1 February 1963, a twin engine PA-23 Apache piloted by George Greaux landed on the newly asphalted runway. The airport was officially opened for service on 24 July 1963. Irausquin had died the year before and his widow cut the ribbon at the official opening ceremony on 18 September.

Greaux and several other investors formed Windward Islands Airways (Winair) in 1961, which offered service to Saba. Regular air service to Saba did not begin immediately due to the need for a STOL aircraft and the small number of people who could afford a ticket. In 1965, the airport went unused for six months. For a while, the island was served by a six-passenger STOL-capable Dornier Do 28 aircraft operated by Windward Islands Airways (Winair). The 1 December 1963, Winair timetable lists flights between Saba and Sint Maarten operated with the Do 28. Service picked up when Windward Islands Airways began flying de Havilland Canada DHC-6 Twin Otters in 1965, with the airline continuing to serve Saba with the Twin Otter as of 2024.

In 1998, Hurricane Georges destroyed the terminal building. The Dutch government funded construction of a new building, which was dedicated on 6 December 2002, to De Haenen. The propeller from De Haenen's first landing on the island is on display in the building.

== Facilities ==
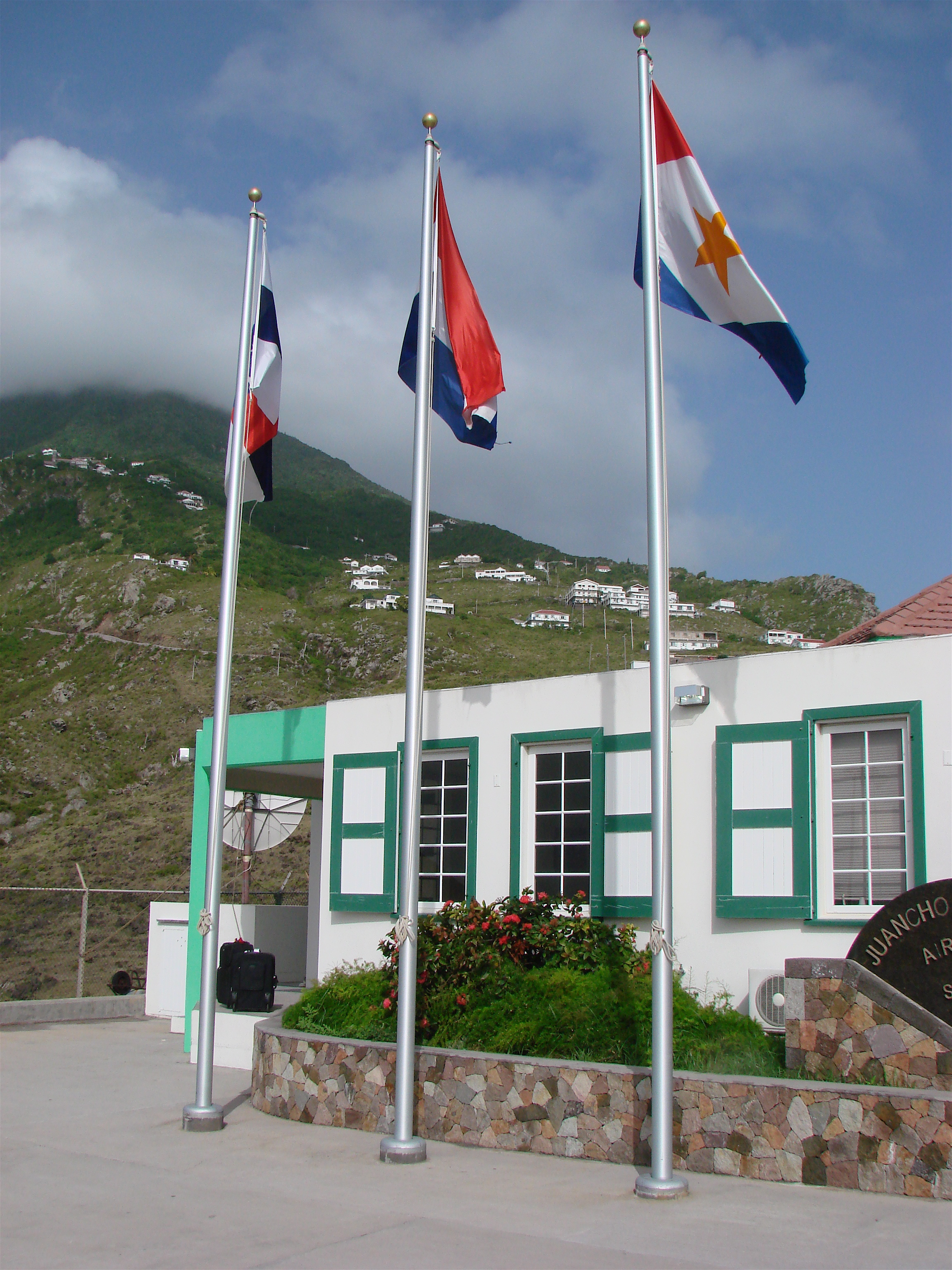
Flags flown outside of the Juancho E. Yrausquin Airport terminal building, 2006

Jet aircraft are unable to land at the airport, because the runway is too short, but smaller STOL airplanes (such as the DHC-6, BN-2, as well as helicopters) are a common sight. A small ramp and terminal are on the south-west flank of the runway. The ramp also has a designated helipad. The terminal building houses offices for Winair, immigration and security, a fire department with one fire truck, and a tower. The tower is an advisory service only and does not provide air traffic control. Aviation fuel is not available on the island.

== Fire station ==
A new fire station on the grounds of Juancho E. Yrausquin Airport was officially opened in December 2023. The facility replaces the outdated fire station previously sited within the airport terminal. The project was commissioned by the Rijksvastgoedbedrijf (Central Government Real Estate Agency of the Netherlands) and developed in collaboration with the Caribbean Netherlands Fire Brigade (BKCN).

The new station includes two garages for fire engines, work and conference rooms, a staff canteen, fitness facilities, and designated training areas. Its design incorporates three functional zones: dirty, intermediate, and clean, to separate operational and administrative activities.

Constructed primarily from locally sourced materials, such as native stone and aggregate, the fire station emphasizes energy efficiency and resilience. The building is partially integrated into the landscape, with the south and west facades built into the hillside to minimize solar heat gain. Rainwater is collected via an underground cistern, due to the lack of a centralized water supply on the island. Designed to withstand Category 5 hurricanes, the reinforced concrete structure meets the highest safety requirements for emergency infrastructure in the region.

In addition to its functional role, the building features a permanent public artwork by Brazilian-Spanish artist Sara Ramo, which incorporates thousands of small, donated objects placed within the outer rock wall. Sourced from members of the local community, the objects represent personal and shared histories, symbolizing the connection between the fire station and the island’s cultural heritage.

== Airlines and destinations ==
The only airline currently providing scheduled services to and from Yrausquin Airport is locally owned Winair, which operates daily flights to Sint Maarten, using a DHC-6 Twin Otter. On average, flights to Sint Maarten last no longer than 15 minutes.

Airlines	Destinations
Winair	Sint Maarten

== Accidents and incidents ==
- 17 May 1971 – A Windward Island Airways Dornier Do-28A-1 (registration PJ-ADI) crashed during landing in strong crosswinds. The aircraft veered off the runway and came to rest in lower terrain adjacent to the airport. No injuries were reported, though a goat was killed. The aircraft was later discarded into the sea and was written off.
- 27 June 1993 – A privately operated Cessna 150F (registration N8672G) made an emergency landing on Saba following an engine failure. The aircraft was destroyed, but both occupants escaped without injury.
- 12 August 2015 – A Cessna 208B Super Cargomaster (registration N924FE), operating cargo flight FDX8124 from San Juan to Basseterre, suffered a loss of engine power and diverted toward Saba. The pilot ditched the aircraft approximately 900 metres offshore after realizing a runway landing was not possible. He was rescued without injury, but the aircraft sank in deep water.

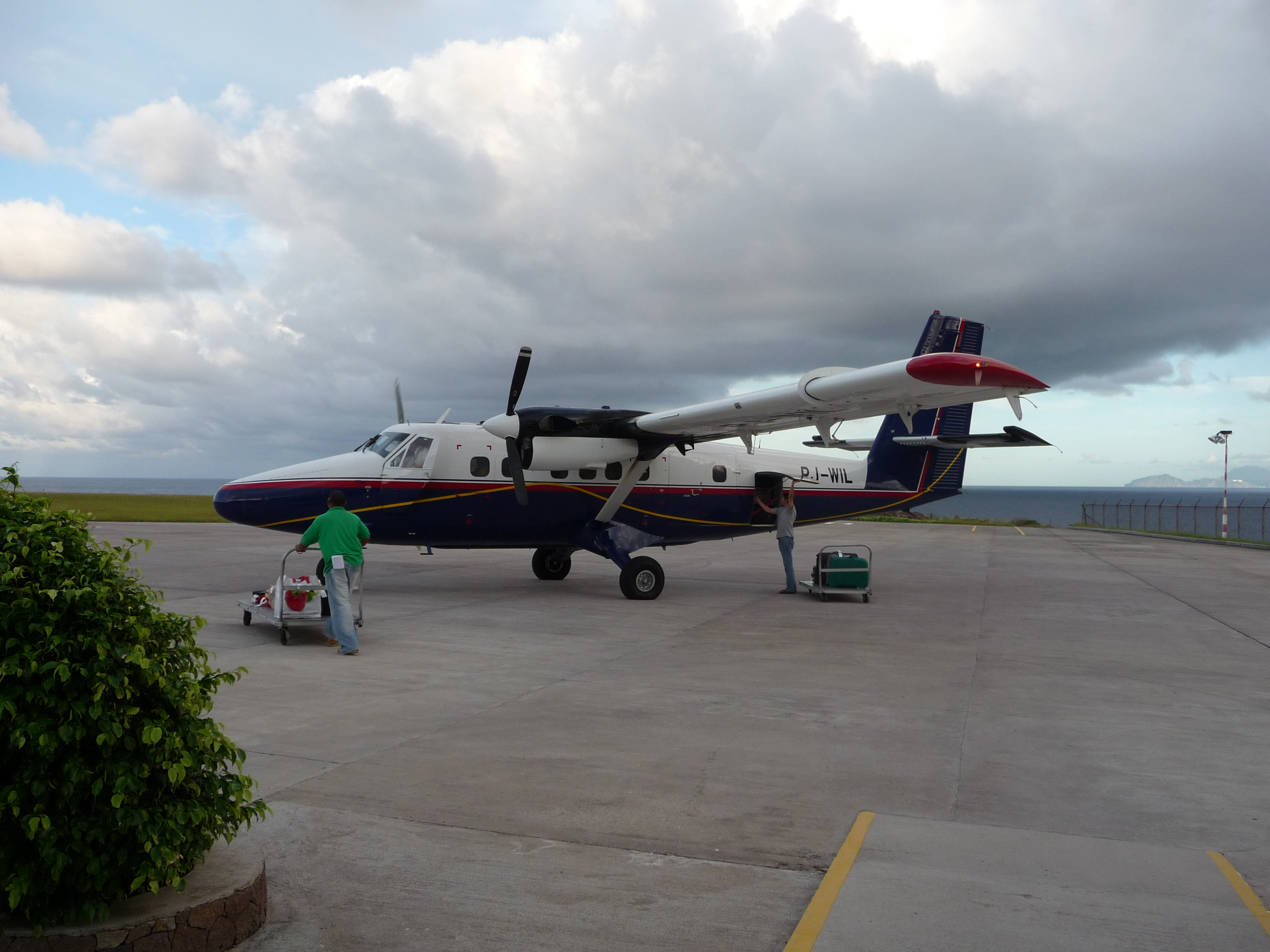
A Windward Express Airways DHC-6 Twin Otter parked at Juancho E. Yrausquin Airport, 2009

- 13 February 2023 – A Britten-Norman BN-2B-20 Islander (registration PJ-WEB) operated by Windward Express Airways sustained substantial damage during a hard landing at the airport. The aircraft struck terrain just short of the threshold of runway 12 before making contact with the runway. Weather conditions, including unexpected downdrafts, contributed to the accident. All three occupants and a dog were unharmed.

== See also ==
- List of shortest runways
- Tabletop runway – Runway on hill with steep edges
