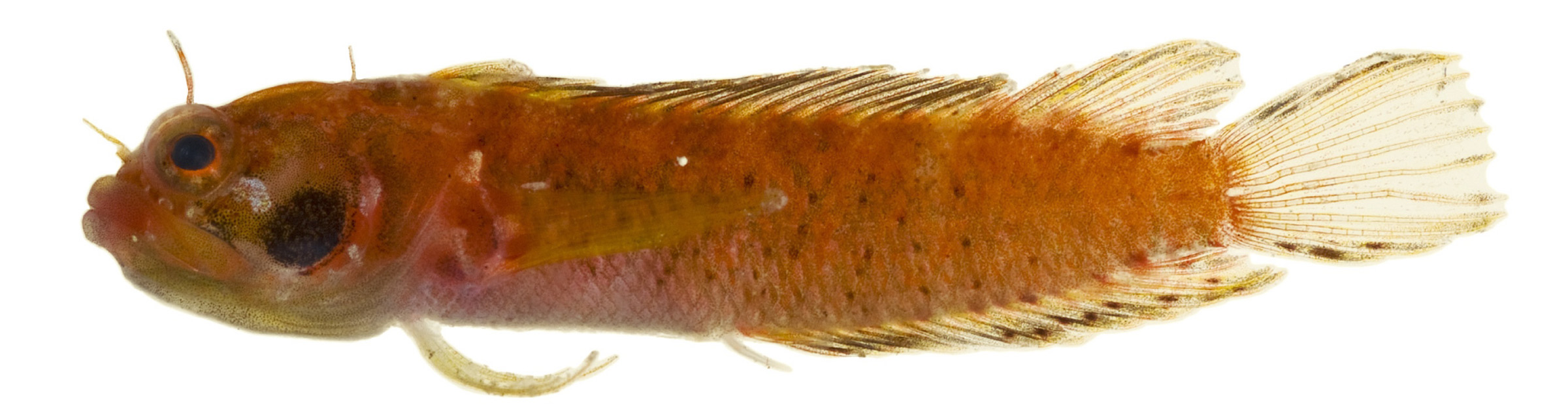
- Male
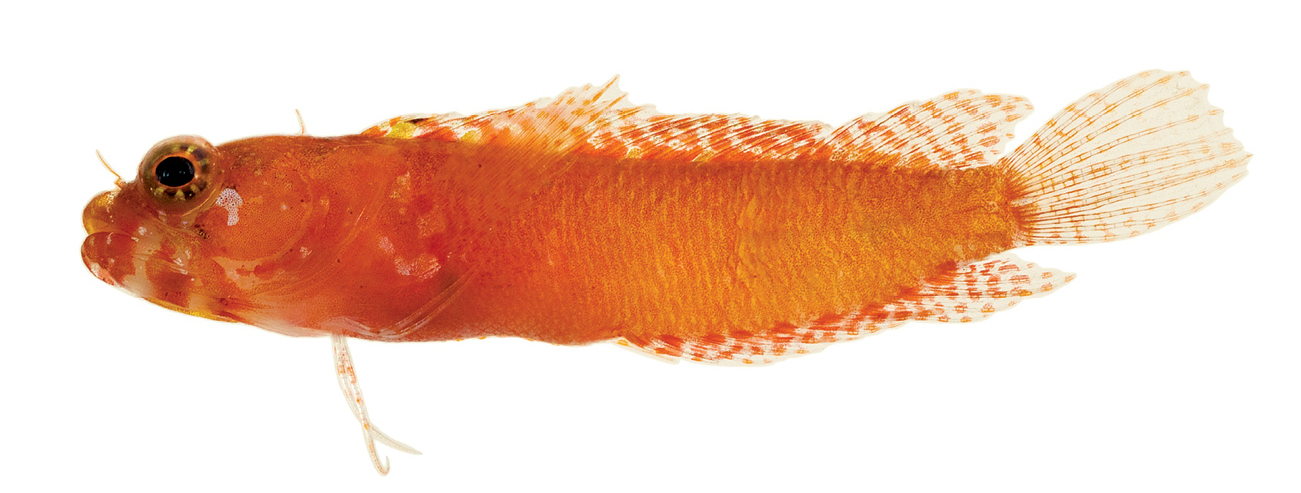
- Female

Conservation status
- Least Concern (IUCN 3.1)

Scientific classification
- Kingdom: Animalia
- Phylum: Chordata
- Class: Actinopterygii
- Order: Blenniiformes
- Family: Labrisomidae
- Genus: Starksia
- Species: S. williamsi

Binomial name
- Starksia williamsi C. C. Baldwin & Castillo, 2011
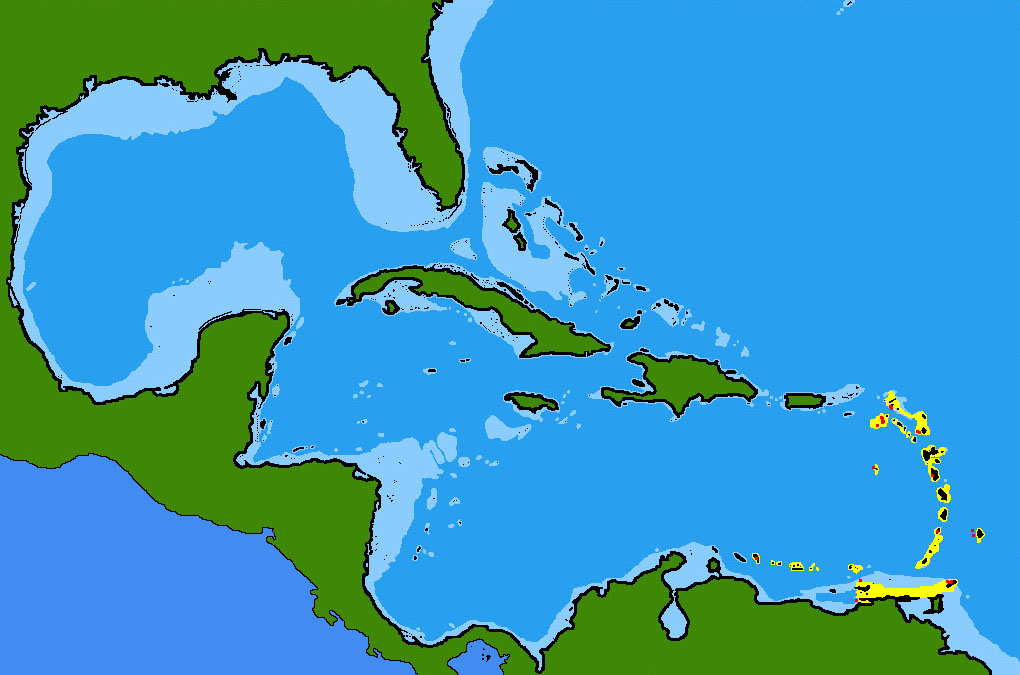

= Starksia williamsi =

Species of fish

Starksia williamsi, the Williams's blenny is a species of labrisomid blenny known only from the Saba Bank in the Netherlands Antilles where it occurs at depths of from 15 to 28 m (49 to 92 ft). It was previously known as Starksia lepicoelia, and is also closely related to Starksia weigti and Starksia robertsoni. It was named after Jeffrey T. Williams, a scientist from Smithsonian's National Museum of Natural History known for his work on Starksia. This species can reach a length of 2.1 cm (0.83 in). The specific name honours the ichthyologist Jeffrey T. Williams of the National Museum of Natural History who has worked extensively on the blenniiform fishes.
