= Saban English =

Variety of English

- Region: Saba
- Language family: Indo-European: Germanic; West Germanic; Ingvaeonic; Anglo-Frisian; Anglic; English; North American English; Caribbean English; Saban English
- Early forms: Old English: Middle English; Early Modern English

Language codes
- ISO 639-3: –
- Glottolog: saba1263
- IETF: en-u-sd-bqsa

Saban English is the local dialect of English spoken on Saba, an island in the Dutch Caribbean. It belongs to the group of Caribbean English varieties. It has been classified by some linguists as a decreolized form of Virgin Islands Creole English. Other linguists posit that Saban English may have never undergone creolization, and that it is a contact variety of English with substrate effects from West African languages and Dutch. There is one published dictionary of Saban English, A Lee Chip, authored by Theodore R. Johnson.

== History ==
With a long history of geographical and economic isolation from other islands, Saba developed a distinct dialect of English.

In the 17th and 18th centuries, several languages and language varieties may have significantly impacted the development Saban dialect of English: Dutch, British English, Irish English, and Scots English spoken by European settlers, and West African languages and/or Caribbean creoles spoken by enslaved Africans.

While colonial Saba did have at least two plantations, the island never developed a planation economy like many of the surrounding islands. As such, creolization may or may not have occurred between the early European settlers and enslaved Africans on the island; instead Saban English may be a variety of English with substrate effects from Dutch, West African languages, and other Caribbean creoles such as Bajan Creole.

Saba has a land area of 13 square kilometres (5.0 sq mi). But despite the island's small size, linguists and locals can distinguish differences in the accents of each of the island's four villages: The Bottom, St. Johns, Windwardside, and Hell's Gate. These differences are likely due to the four villages' distinct settlement histories, as well as intra-island isolation into the early 20th century. In addition to pronunciation differences between the villages, the Saban English dictionary notes many lexical differences as well.

== Phonology ==
=== Vowels ===
The realization of vowels in Saban English is as follows. The vowels below are named by the lexical set they belong to:

- The KIT vowel can be pronounced as either [ɪ] or [ɛ].
- The DRESS vowel can be pronounced as either [ɛ], [ɛ:], or [ɛ~æ].
- The TRAP vowel can be pronounced as [a], [æ] or is merged with the vowel in LOT as [ɑ].
- The STRUT vowel can merge with the THOUGHT vowel, being pronounced as [ɔ].
- The FOOT vowel can be pronounced as [ʊ~ʌ] or [ʌ].
- The FLEECE vowel is pronounced as [i:].
- The THOUGHT vowel is pronounced as [ɔ].
- The LOT vowel: This vowel is either [ɑ], [ɒ] or [ɔ].
- The FACE vowel is generally monophthongized to [e:] or [ɛ:]; it merges with the FLEECE vowel before nasal consonants, so words like mean and main are often homophonous.
- The START vowel is realized as [ɑɹ] or [ɑ:].
- The NORTH vowel is generally merged with the START vowel as [ɑɹ].
- The FORCE vowel: The NORTH/FORCE split has been preserved on Saba, but it appears to be undergoing merger (into [ɑɹ]).
- The NURSE vowel: in rhotic words, it merges with the FORCE or STRUT; in non-rhotic words it is realized as [ʌ].
- The GOAT is generally [oə] or monophthongized to [o:] or [o:~oə].
- The NEAR and SQUARE vowels are generally merged, and can be realized as either [eə] or [iə].
- The PRICE/PRIZE vowel can be pronounced as either [ʌɪ] or [ɛɪ]..
- The CHOICE vowel can be pronounced as either [ʊɪ], [ʌɪ], or [ɔɪ]
- The MOUTH vowel can be pronounced between [aʊ] and [ɔʊ] or [ɔʊ] and [oʊ].
- The lettER/commA vowel is pronounced as [a].

=== Consonants ===
The Saban dialect is not purely rhotic nor non-rhotic. Post-vocalic /r/ is absent in unstressed syllables or following front vowels, but pronounced in stressed syllables and following back vowels, with the exception of the words more and farm. Phrase initially, /r/ is pronounced as [ɹ].

H-dropping is common in Saban dialects. [θ] becomes [ʔ] intervocalically and phrase finally, math is pronounced like /maʔ/. T-glottalization is also common intervocally, phrase finally and in clusters: water, hospital, bet and ate are pronounced like [wɒʔa], [haspɪʔl], [bɛ:ʔ] and [ɛ:ʔ].

There is poor distinction between the [v] and [w] sounds in Saban English. The contrast is often neutralized or merged into [v], [w] or [β], so village sounds like [wɪlɪdʒ], [vɪlɪdʒ] or [βɪlɪdʒ]. This also happens in the Vincentian, Bermudian, Bahamian English and other Caribbean Englishes. This results in the word seventh being pronounced as [sɛβənʔ].

Metathesis is a common feature of Saban English and results in words like "ask" sounding like [æks]. Nasal backing is common in Saban English: "Town" sounds like [taʊŋ] and "ground" sounds like [graʊŋ]. Consonant cluster are often reduced.

== Grammar ==
Ain't ([ɛ̃ː], [ɛn] or [ɛnt]) is frequently used in negations and can be used in the place of words like didn’t or haven’t. Saban English also makes extensive use of the expression “for to” as in the sentence: This is ready for to come ripe.
