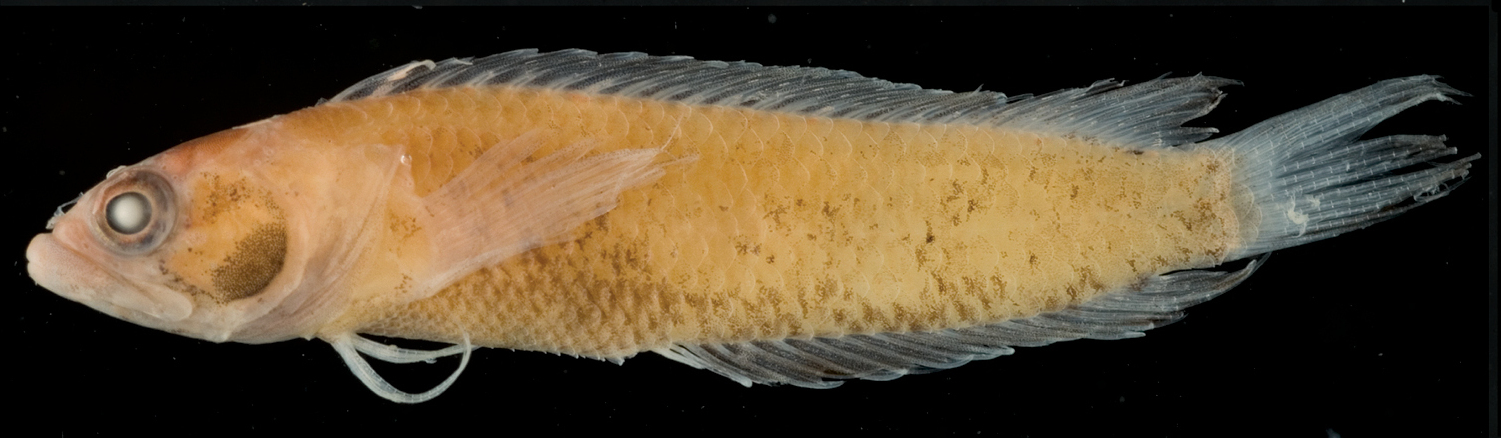
- Male (length 20 mm)
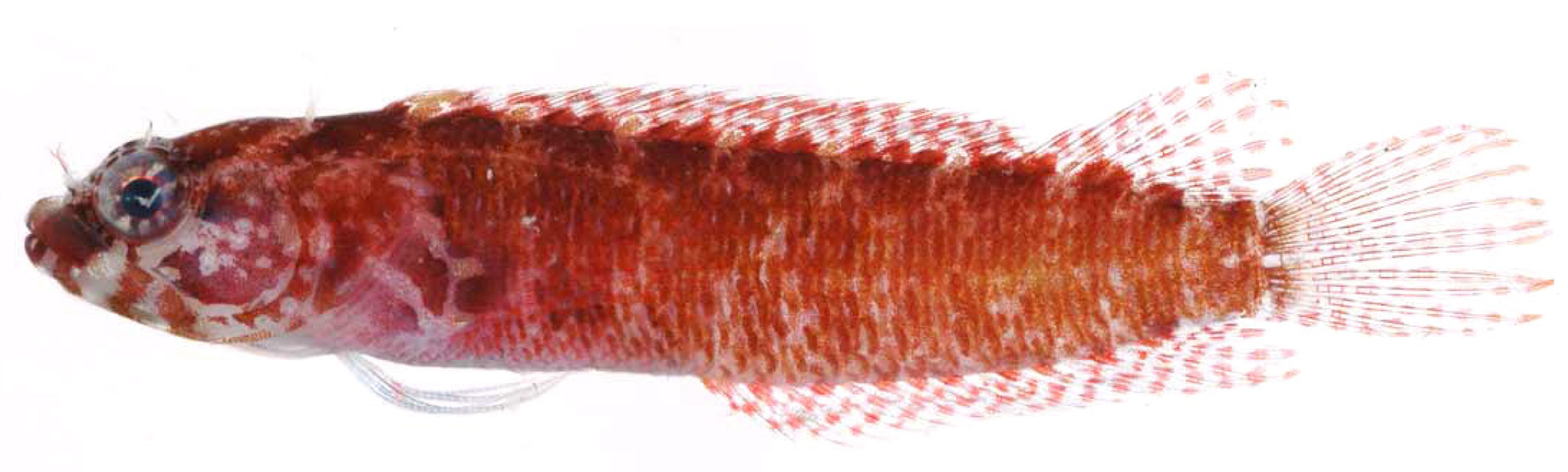
- Female (length 22 mm)

Conservation status
- Least Concern (IUCN 3.1)

Scientific classification
- Kingdom: Animalia
- Phylum: Chordata
- Class: Actinopterygii
- Order: Blenniiformes
- Family: Labrisomidae
- Genus: Starksia
- Species: S. robertsoni

Binomial name
- Starksia robertsoni C. C. Baldwin, Victor & Castillo, 2011
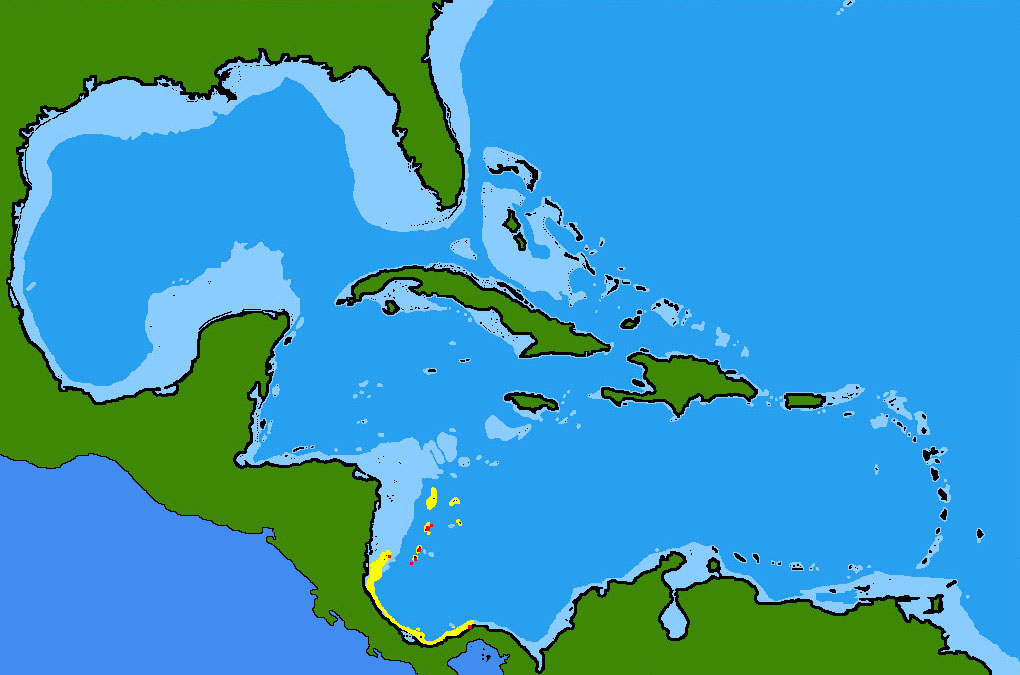

= Starksia robertsoni =

Species of fish

Starksia robertsoni, the Robertson's blenny, is a species of labrisomid blenny native to the Caribbean coast of Panama and Islas de Las Dos Hermanas near Portobelo. It was previously included in Starksia lepicoelia, and is also closely related to Starksia weigti and Starksia williamsi. It is named after D. Ross Robertson, a scientist from Smithsonian Institution. Males of this species can reach a length of 2.1 cm (0.83 in) SL while females are slightly larger at 2.2 cm (0.87 in).
