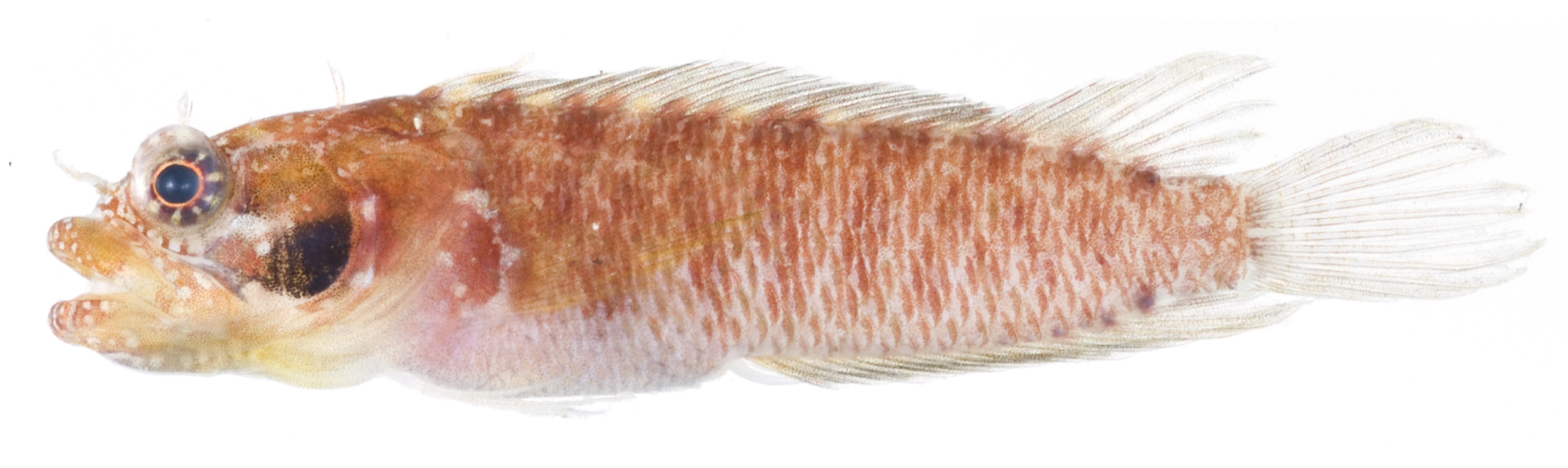
- Male (length 25 mm)
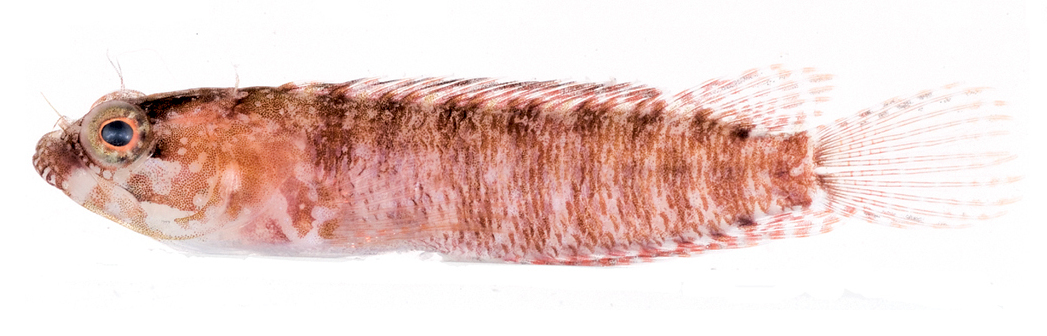
- Female (length 18 mm)

Conservation status
- Least Concern (IUCN 3.1)

Scientific classification
- Kingdom: Animalia
- Phylum: Chordata
- Class: Actinopterygii
- Order: Blenniiformes
- Family: Labrisomidae
- Genus: Starksia
- Species: S. weigti

Binomial name
- Starksia weigti C. C. Baldwin & Castillo, 2011
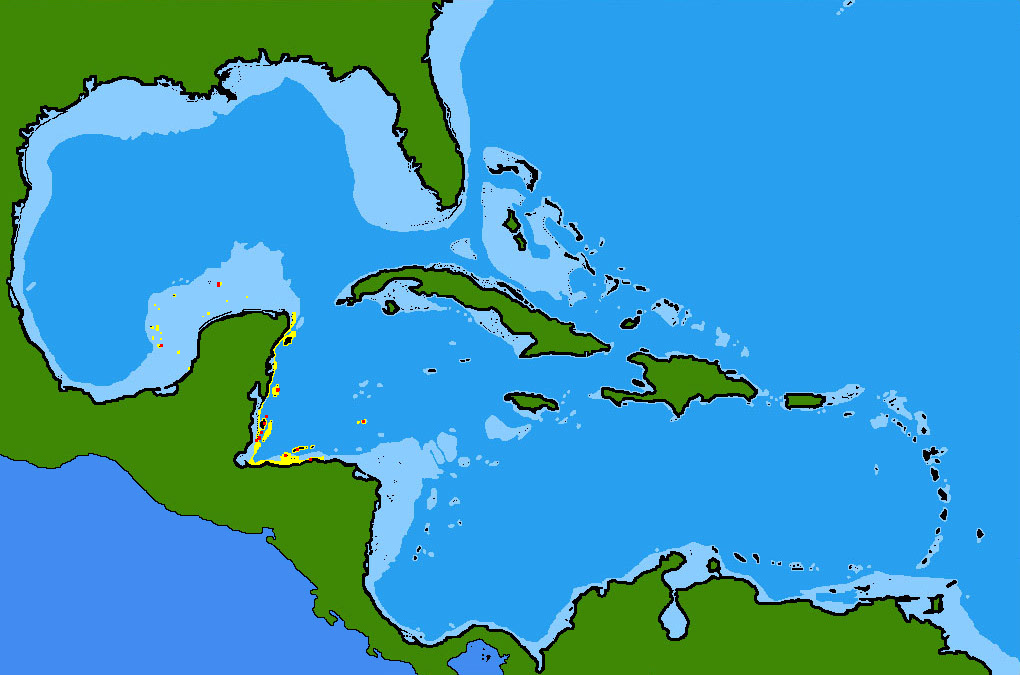

= Starksia weigti =

Species of fish

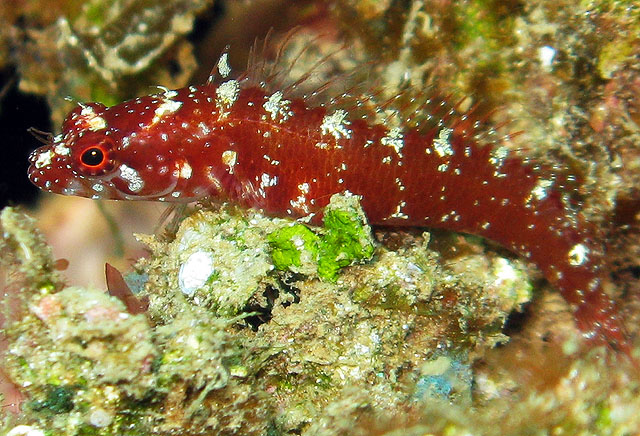
Starksia weigti

Starksia weigti, the Weigt's blenny, is a species of labrisomid blenny known only from the Caribbean coastal waters of Belize at depths of from 6 to 8 metres (20 to 26 ft). It was previously known as Starksia lepicoelia, and is also closely related to Starksia williamsi and Starksia robertsoni. It is named after Lee A. Weigt, head of the Smithsonian's Laboratories of Analytical Biology. Males of this species can reach a length of 2.4 cm (0.94 in) SL While females reach 1.9 cm (0.75 in). >
