= Cornelia Jones =

- Born: Cornelia Rosina Jones; 10 September 1907; St. Johns, Saba
- Died: 23 December 1979 (aged 72); The Bottom, Saba, Netherlands Antilles
- Other names: Cutchie Jones
- Occupations: Innkeeper, politician

Cornelia Rosina Jones (10 September 1907 – 23 December 1979) was a Dutch woman from the island of Saba, in the Caribbean Netherlands, who ran the Government Guesthouse on the island and was the first woman to serve on the Island Council of Saba, making her the first female to hold office in the Windward Islands. She was honored by Queen Juliana of the Netherlands for her years of service to Saba.

== Early life ==
Cornelia Jones, known as "Cutchie", was born on 10 September 1907 in the village of St. John's on the island of Saba, at the time a part of the Dutch Empire, to Mary Jane (née Hassell) and Fernandus Jones. She was of mixed parentage, her father being a black sailor and her mother a white islander, and came from a family with two older siblings and one younger brother.

== Career ==
Jones ran the Government Guesthouse on the island, one of the few places available for tourist lodging. The guesthouse was a two-story building, built by the territorial authority, which had a parlor, library, dining room and kitchen on the lower floor and guest rooms on the upper story. Jones managed the property and acted as hostess of the island, as well as the cook and housekeeper of the guesthouse. She was frequently the feature of articles in magazines and newspapers from visiting officials and tourists to the island.

In 1951, Jones ventured into politics, running for the territorial council with two other women candidates, Ursula Dunkin-Hughes and Millicent L. Wilson. Between the three women candidates, they only received three votes. In 1953, when Kenneth Peterson resigned from the council, Jones was approved as his replacement, serving through 1954. She ran again for the council in 1953 and though Jones was not reelected, she was held in high esteem. When developers proposed in 1955 to replace the Government House with a hotel financed by Dutch backers, the island council refused because the investors would not guarantee Jones' continued employment. After many years service at the Government Guesthouse, Jones became the innkeeper of the Windwardside Guesthouse. She was honored by Queen Juliana of the Netherlands for her years of service to Saba.

== Death and legacy ==
Jones died on 23 December 1979 at her home on the peaks above The Bottom, on Saba. She was buried next to the family home.
