= Saba Comprehensive School =

Location
- St. Johns; Saba
- Coordinates: 17.620858°N 63.24339999999995°W

Information
- Type: Secondary school
- Established: November 22, 1976
- Website: learningsaba.com

Saba Comprehensive School (SCS) is the sole secondary and vocational school in St. Johns, Saba. It was established in 1976 and since 1991 has taught in English. Since the 2020s it has taught classes in agriculture and maritime operations. Advanced work on a new school building began in 2023.

== History ==
Saba Comprehensive School was established on November 22, 1976, with 100 Antillean guilders from the cofounders. Previously, Saba children wanting to take Middelbaar algemeen voortgezet onderwijs (MAVO) 3 and 4 classes had to go to St. Maarten; SCS began its MAVO 3 and 4 classes in 1988 and 1990, respectively. English became the medium of instruction in the 1990–1991 school year. The school was previously in The Bottom.

Since 2020 the school has run a Maritime Course Seaman Operations programme in which students learn how to operate a vessel. The school operates a ship simulator computer and, in January 2021, acquired the former Sea Rescue Foundation vessel Erika for practical instruction. In 2022 the school began to teach classes in agriculture. Since January 2023 students have received a free school breakfast funded by the Ministry of Social Affairs and Employment.

In December 2023 two teachers, who had been shared with the island's junior school, were laid off. The cuts were blamed on restrictions on the junior school budget.

== New building ==
In 2023 construction began of a new school on an open space in front of the old building and gym. Archaeologists working in the site found artefacts from as early as the 17th century as well as the suspected early 20th century graves of an adult and newborn.
