= Green Island, Saba =

Island of Saba

Green Island
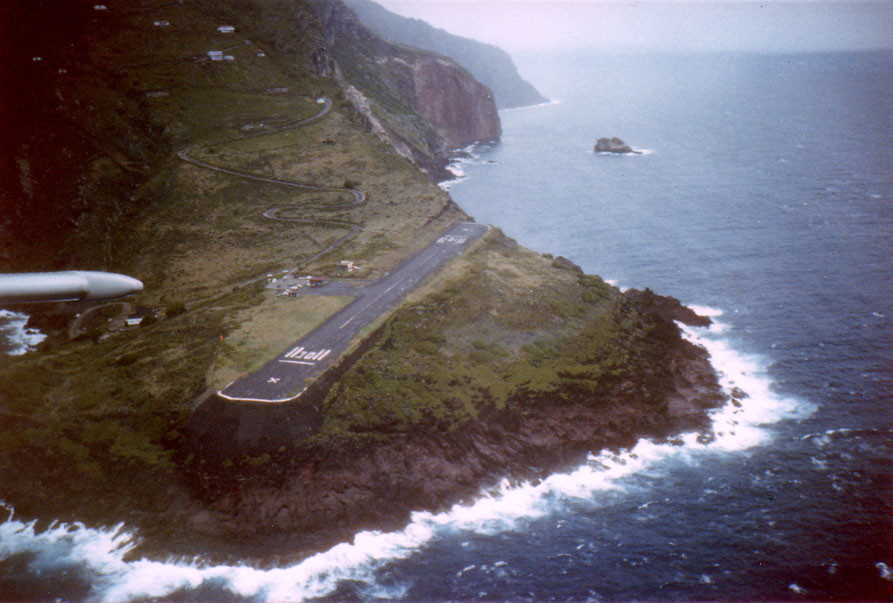
- Green Island is the dot in the distance

- Location within Saba Location within Lesser Antilles

Geography
- Location: Caribbean
- Coordinates: 17.64900°N 63.22985°W
- Archipelago: Leeward Islands, Lesser Antilles
- Area: 0.24 ha (0.59 acres)

Administration
- Netherlands
- Public body: Saba

Demographics
- Population: 0

Green Island is a small uninhabited islet about 250 metres north of the Caribbean island of Saba, and is part of the Dutch special municipality of Saba. It measures about 40 by 60 metres.

The island is used by bridled terns, sooty terns, and brown noddies for breeding. There was a sulphur mine on the main island across from Green Island. In the 1870s, the two islands were connected by a cable in order to provide access to the mines. The island is being used as a diving site.
