= Saba (island) =

Dutch Caribbean island

- Special municipality of the Netherlands
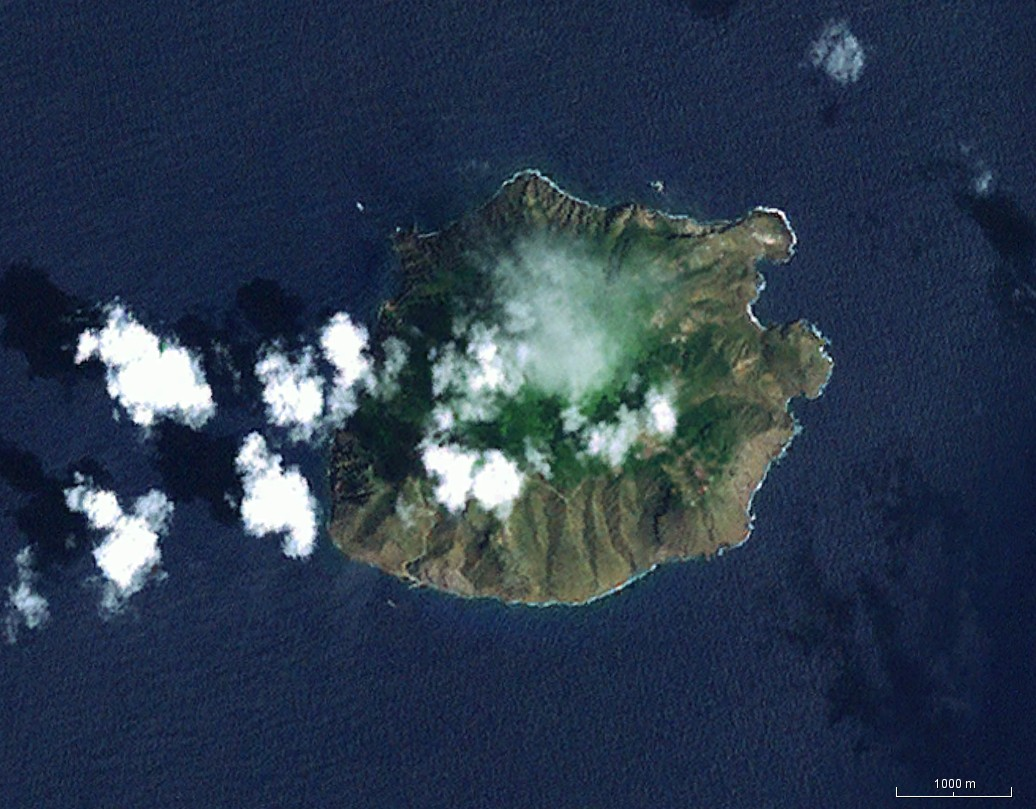
- Satellite image of Saba

- Flag Coat of arms
- Motto: "Remis Velisque" (Latin) "With oars and sails" (English)
- Anthem: "Saba you rise from the ocean"
- Location of Saba (island) (circled in red) in the Caribbean

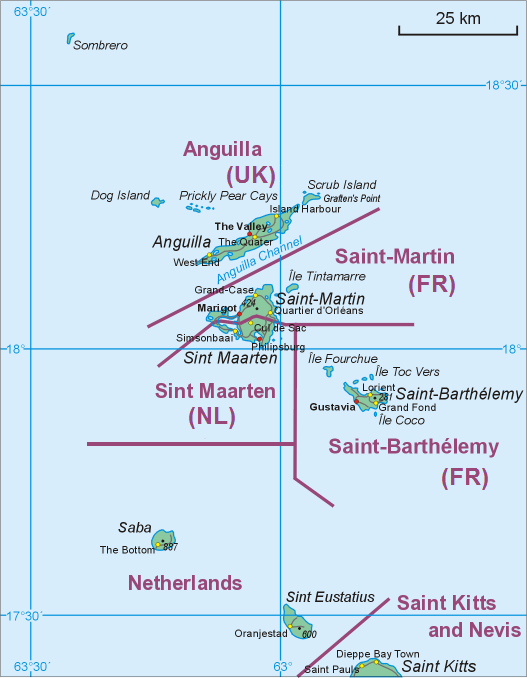
- Map showing location of Saba relative to Sint Eustatius and Saint Martin.
- Coordinates: 17°37′57″N 63°14′15″W
- Country: Netherlands
- Overseas region: Caribbean Netherlands
- Incorporated into the Netherlands: 10 October 2010 (dissolution of the Netherlands Antilles)
- Municipal seat: The Bottom

Government (see Politics of the Netherlands)
  - Lt. Governor: Jocelyn Levenstone

Area
  - Total: 13 km^{2} (5.0 sq mi)

Population (1 January 2025)
  - Total: 2,158
  - Density: 148/km^{2} (380/sq mi)
- Demonyms: Saban; Dutch

Languages
  - Official: English • Dutch

Ethnicity
  - Saban: 26.6 %
  - Sint Maarten: 15.7 %
  - American: 10.0 %
  - other: 47.7 %
- Time zone: UTC−4 (AST)
- Calling code: +599-4
- ISO 3166 code: BQ-SA, NL-BQ2
- Currency: United States dollar ($) (USD)
- Internet TLD: .nl; .bq (Note: .bq is designated, but not in use, for the Caribbean Netherlands. Like the rest of the Netherlands, .nl is primarily in use.)

Saba (Note: /ˈseɪbə/ SAY-bə, Dutch: [ˈsaːbaː]) is a Caribbean island and the smallest special municipality (officially "public body") of the Netherlands. It consists largely of the dormant volcano Mount Scenery, which at 870 meters (2,854.3 ft) is the highest point of the entire Kingdom of the Netherlands. The island lies in the northern Leeward Islands portion of the West Indies, southeast of the Virgin Islands. Together with Bonaire and Sint Eustatius it forms the Caribbean Netherlands, also known as the BES islands.

Saba has a land area of 13 square kilometers (5.0 sq mi). The population was 2,158 in January 2025, with a population density of 147 inhabitants per square kilometer (380/sq mi). It is the smallest territory by permanent population in the Americas. Its towns and major settlements are The Bottom (the capital), Windwardside, Zion's Hill, and St. Johns.

== Etymology ==
Theories about the origin of Saba's name include siba (the Arawakan word for 'rock'), sabot, sábado, and Sheba. The island was referred to by its present name, Saba, as early as 1595 when it appeared in a voyage account by John Hawkins. Before its present name, the island was designated "St. Christopher" (San Cristóbal) by Christopher Columbus.

== History ==
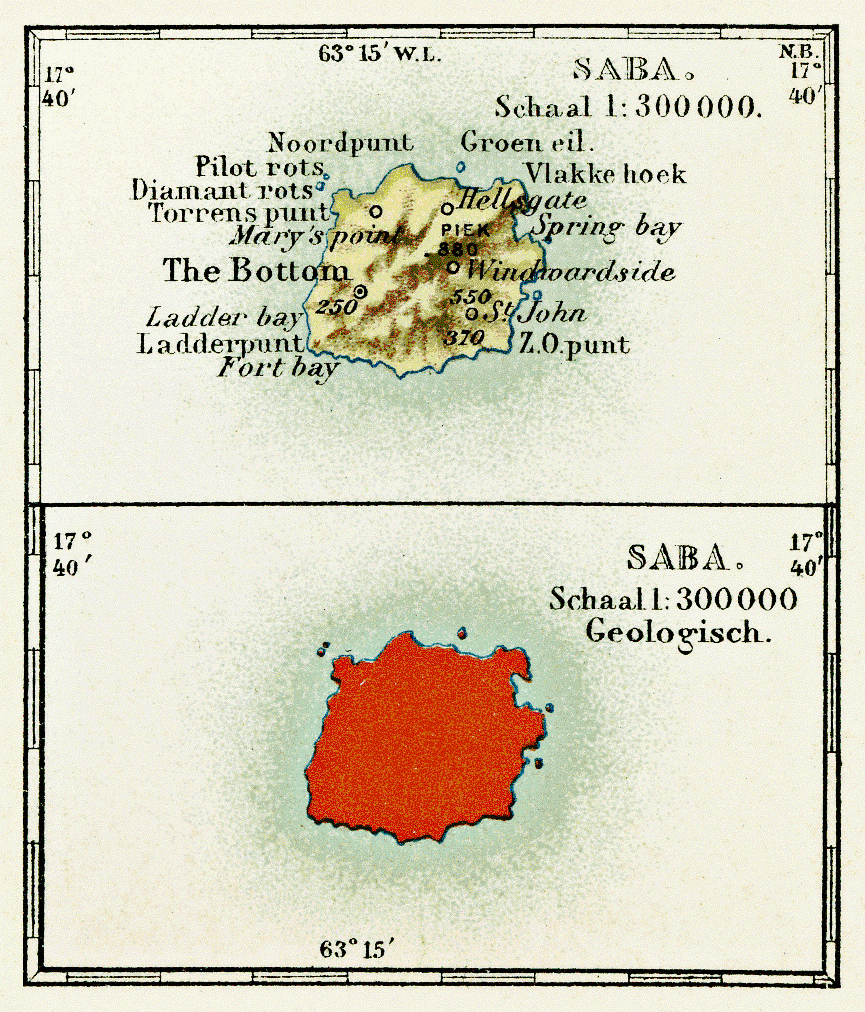
Map of Saba from the Encyclopaedie van Nederlandsch West-Indië 1914–1917

=== Precolonial ===
Archaeological evidence indicates that Saba was first inhabited around 3300 years ago, with the earliest known site at Plum Piece dating to approximately 1300 BC. The island's isolation and rugged terrain suggest that its early settlers possessed advanced maritime navigation skills, likely originating from South America. Over 20 pre-Columbian sites have been found in Saba. The main occupation in Saba seems to have occurred between AD 400 and 1450. During this time the inhabitants of Saba were full horticulturalists living from the cultivation of root crops and the exploitation of the marine environment. They produced pottery vessels, made tools and sculptured objects from stone, shell, animal, bone, and coral.

=== Colonial ===
Christopher Columbus is said to have sighted the island on 13 November 1493. However, he did not land, being deterred by the island's perilous rocky shores. In 1632, a group of shipwrecked Englishmen landed upon Saba. In the 1640s, the Dutch governor of the neighboring island of Sint Eustatius sent several Dutch families over to colonize the island for the Dutch West India Company. In 1664, refusing to swear allegiance to the English crown, these original Dutch settlers were evicted to St. Maarten by Jamaican governors pirates Edward, Thomas, and Henry Morgan. The Netherlands eventually gained complete control of the island in 1816.

=== 18th and 19th centuries ===
In the 17th and 18th centuries, Saba's major industries were sugar, indigo, and rum produced on plantations owned by Dutchmen living on St. Eustatius, and later fishing, particularly lobster fishing. To work these plantations, enslaved people were imported from Africa. In the 17th century, Saba was believed to be a favorite hideout for Jamaican pirates. England also deported its "undesirable" people to live in the Caribbean colonies, and some of them also became pirates, a few taking haven on Saba. As the island's coast is forbidding and steep, the island became a private sanctuary for the families of smugglers and pirates. One notable Saban pirate was Hiram Beakes, son of the Dutch councilor of the island.

In August 1857, Venezuela and the Netherlands submitted a dispute over the possession of Isla de Aves to arbitration by the Queen of Spain, because the Netherlands considered the island linked to its colony of Saba by a sand bank, and fishermen from St. Eustatius and Saba had used the place to harvest turtles and birds' eggs, while Venezuela argued that it had inherited the island from Spain which had discovered all the Caribbean islands, that the fishermen were not acting on behalf of any government but for a particular interest and that this island was not attached to the territory that the Netherlands had received.

The Spanish decision of 30 June 1865, declared that the ownership of the Island belonged to Venezuela and that the Netherlands should nevertheless be compensated. It argued that even if the two islands had been united, the sandbank was now separate from the island of Saba and that the first state to have a military force and to exercise sovereignty there had been Venezuela, which had inherited it from the Captaincy General of Venezuela.

During the late 19th century, Saba lace, a Spanish form of needlework introduced by a nun from Venezuela, became an important product made by the island's women. Throughout the late 19th century and early 20th century, the primary source of revenue for the island came from the lacework produced by these women. During this period of time, with most of the island's men gone out to sea for extended periods, the island became known as "The Island of Women".

=== 20th and 21st centuries ===
In 1943, Joseph "Lambee" Hassell, a self-taught engineer, designed "The Road" on Saba, which was built by hand by island residents. It drastically changed transport on the island, which had been carried out only by foot or by mule previously. An airport followed in 1963, and a larger pier geared for tourist boats in 1972. As a result, tourism increased, gradually becoming a major part of the Saban economy.

In 1978, Venezuela and the Kingdom of the Netherlands signed the maritime limits treaty that defined the extension of the Dutch and Venezuelan exclusive economic zone in two areas, the first between the islands of Aruba, Curaçao, and Bonaire (in front of the State of Falcon in Venezuela and next to the Los Monjes Archipelago) and a second area further north that includes the islands of Saba and St. Eustatius, the latter taking as a reference the Isla de Aves (the northernmost point of Venezuela in the Caribbean Sea). At that time, the six islands were part of an administrative entity called the Netherlands Antilles. The treaty recognizes an equidistant or median line between the Island of Aves and the Island of Saba as a maritime boundary.

A status referendum was held in Saba on 5 November 2004, and 86.05% of the population voted for closer links to the Netherlands. This was duly achieved in October 2010, when the Netherlands Antilles was dissolved and Saba became a special municipality of the Netherlands.

== Geography and ecology ==
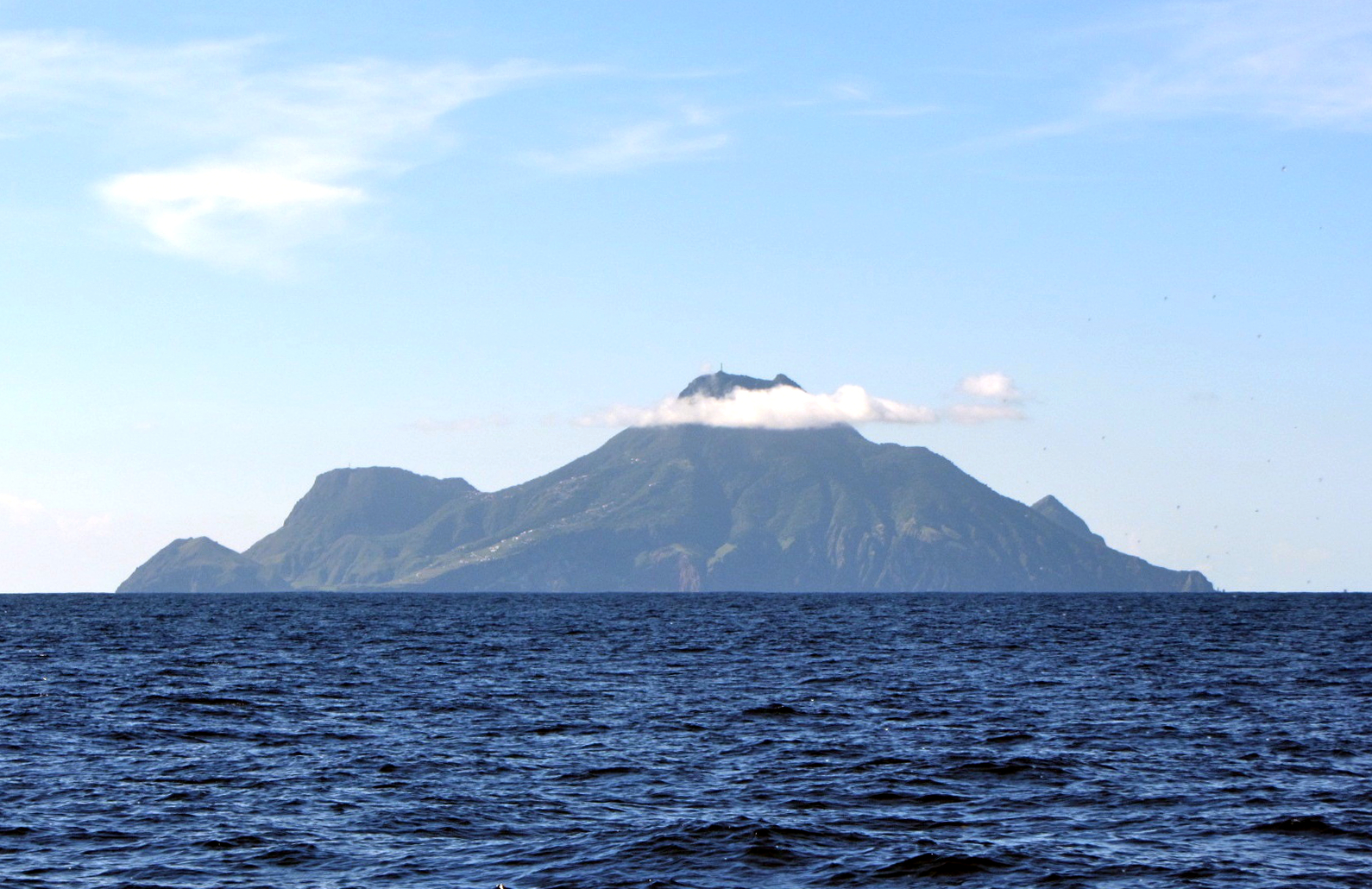
Saba island, as viewed from the north, with Mount Scenery's peak in the clouds

Saba is a small island at 13 square kilometers (5.0 sq mi) in size and roughly circular in shape. It lies north-west of Sint Eustatius and south-west of Saint Barthélemy and Sint Maarten. The terrain is generally mountainous, and the center of the island is dominated by its volcanic peak, Mount Scenery, which stands 870 m (2,850 ft) above sea level. Off the north coast lies the much smaller Green Island.

Saba is the northernmost active volcano in the Lesser Antilles Volcanic Arc chain of islands. At 870 meters (2,850 ft), Mount Scenery is also the highest point within the Kingdom of the Netherlands. The island is composed of a single rhombus-shaped volcano measuring 4.6 kilometers (2.9 mi) east to west and 4.0 kilometers (2.5 mi) north to south. The oldest dated rocks on Saba are around 400,000 years old, and the most recent eruption was shortly before the 1630s European settlement. Between 1995 and 1997, an increase in local seismic activity was associated with a 7–12 °C (13–22 °F) rise in the temperature of the hot springs on the island's northwest and southeast coasts.

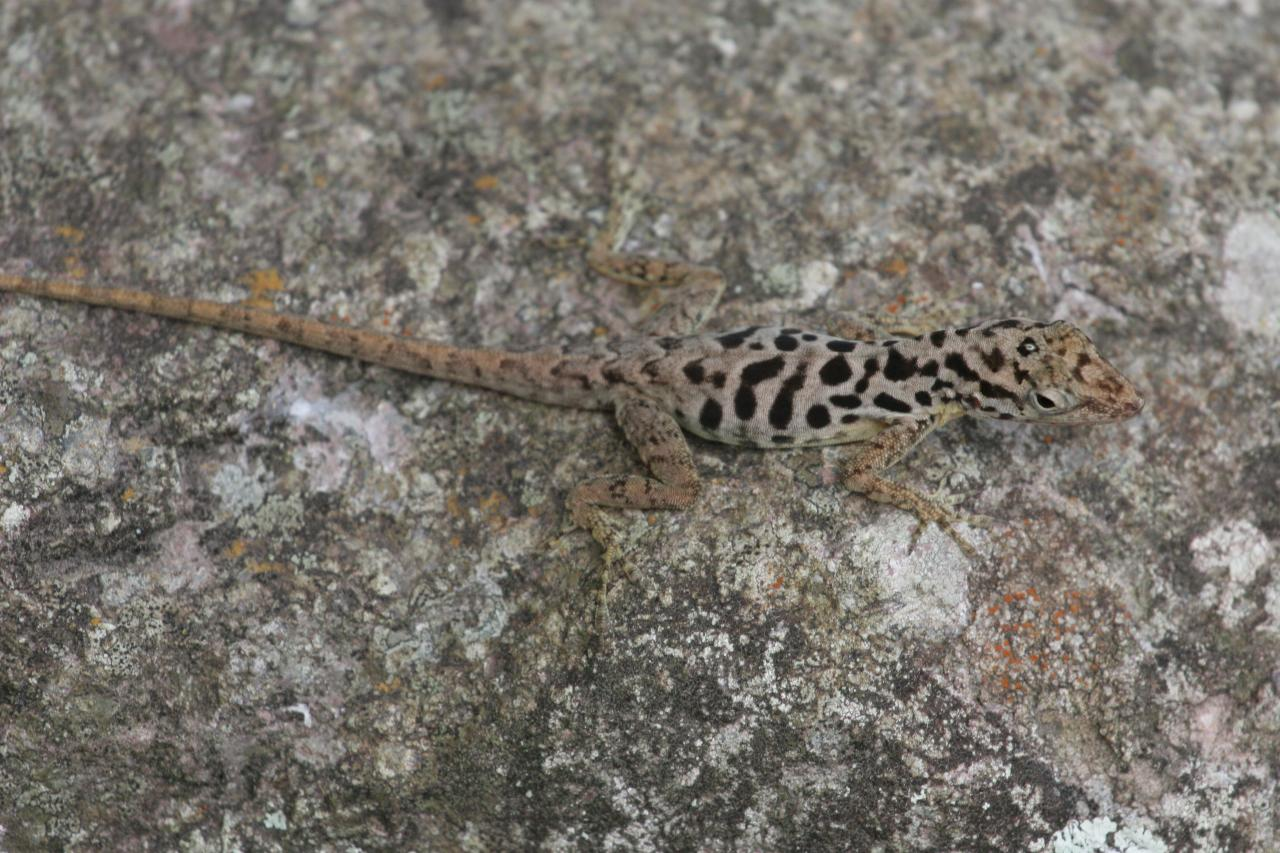
The Saban anole is endemic to the island.

Being an island, Saba is home to a number of endemic species including the Saban black iguana (Iguana iguana melanoderma), Red-bellied racer (Alsophis rufiventris), Saban anole (Anolis sabanus), and Lesser Antillean funnel-eared bat (Natalus stramineus stramineus). However, several non-native species have settled on the island, including the Underwood's spectacled tegu (Gymnophthalmus underwoodi), brahminy blind snake (Indotyphlops braminus), and non-native iguanas, all of which are believed to have arrived on cargo shipments from Sint Maarten.

=== Climate ===
Due to its considerable relief, Saba boasts a higher level of precipitation than other islands. At present, the island's climate is very similar to that of mainland South America. The yearly climate of Saba can be divided into three intervals: dry, intermediate and wet periods. The dry period lasts from January to May with a monthly rainfall of around 50 to 100 mm (2.0 to 3.9 in). The intermediate period extends from May to September, when rainfall is moderate. The final months of the year represent the wet season when precipitation is high. The temperature at sea is approximately 25 °C (77 °F).

=== Cloud forest ===
There is an 8.6-hectare (21-acre) cloud forest located at and above 825 meters (2,707 ft) on top of the mountain referred to as the "Elfin Forest Reserve" because of its high altitude mist and mossy appearance. The most dominant tree in the cloud forest is the Mountain Mahogany (Freziera undulate), although hurricanes over the years have destroyed a large number of the mature trees. Despite the name, the mountain mahogany is not related to other mahogany species; although one species of true mahogany tree is found on the island at lower levels, the small-leaved mahogany (Swietenia mahagoni). In the underbrush of the mahogany trees, the Sierran palm (Prestoea montana) and tree ferns dominate, with a large variety of epiphytes and Orchids growing on the trunks and branches of all the trees. Wild raspberries and plantain trees can also be found growing on most of the mountain. All seven of the Lesser Antilles Endemic Bird Area restricted-range birds occur in the Elfin Forest Reserve.

=== Forests ===
Below the cloud forest is a sub-montane forest, and the variety and average number of species are considerably less. Redwood and Mountain fuchsia tree trees grow wild in this zone, as well as cactus species, such as the prickly pear, and Seagrape trees. On the lowest southern and eastern slopes of Saba are grassy meadows and scattered shrubs. Saba National Land Park is a 35-hectare (86-acre) national park located on the north coast of Saba. Formerly owned by the Sulphur Mining Company, the park was established in January 1998 and the property was officially turned over to the Saba Conservation Foundation in 1999. It stretches from the coastline all the way up to the cloud forest, and encompasses all vegetation zones present on Saba.

=== Coastline ===
The coastline of Saba is mostly rubble and rocky cliffs that are 100 meters (330 ft) or taller with mostly cobble and boulder permanent beaches. The steep terrain and sheer bluffs dropping almost straight down to the ocean's edge prevents the formation of mangrove swamps or much vegetation. There are eight bays tucked into the cliffs around the island; Cove Bay, Spring Bay, Core Gut Bay, Fort Bay (location of the island's only port), Tent Bay, Ladder Bay, Wells Bay and Cave of Rum Bay. Saba's coastline also includes the Flat Point Tide Pools, which were created by a large lava flow thousands of years ago. These tide pools are located below the airport at Flat Point, and feature large lava rock formations filled with colorful saltwater pools. The pools are home to diverse marine life, including small fish, sea urchins, crabs, and sea flora.

The shoreline of the island is of particular value to sea birds, and has been designated an Important Bird Area (IBA AN006 – "Saba Coastline") by BirdLife International. Saba is home to about sixty species of birds, many of which are sea birds that use the holes and crevices of the steep cliffs and two small islands for breeding and feed in the waters around the island. Saba's shoreline is home to the Caribbean's largest breeding colony of Red-billed tropicbird (Phaethon aethereus). Other birds include the Common Ground Dove, the Brown Noddy, the Least Sandpiper, and the Yellow-billed Tropicbird. The Sargasso Shearwater (Puffinus lherminieri) is another common bird, and is the national bird of Saba as well as being featured on their coat of arms.

About 4.3 kilometers (2.7 mi) southwest of the island is the northeastern edge of the Saba Bank, the largest submarine atoll in the Atlantic Ocean with an especially rich biodiversity. Saba Bank is the top of a sea mount and it is a prime fishing ground, particularly for lobster.

== Government ==
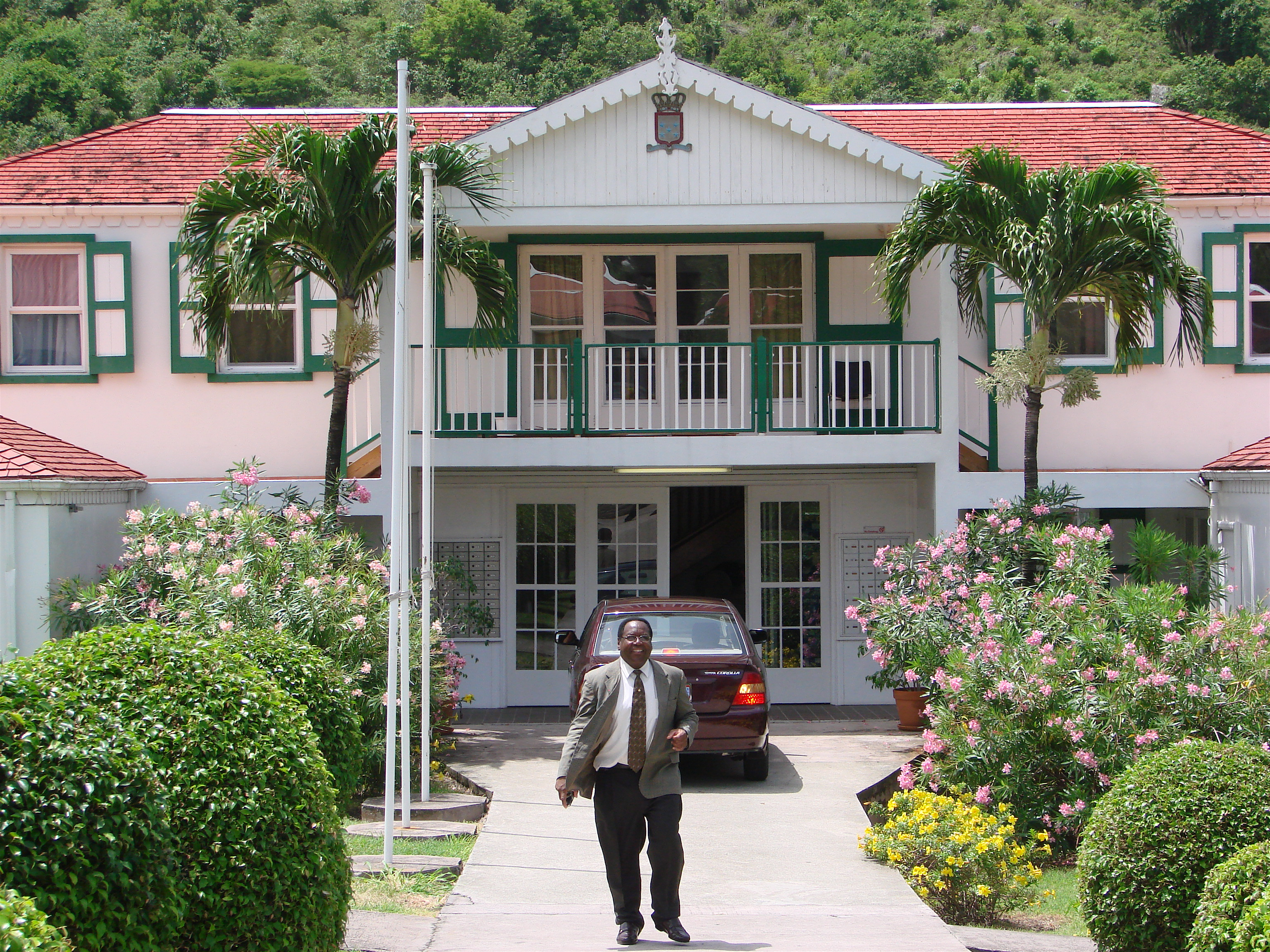
Saba's government house

=== Relationship with mainland Netherlands ===
Saba became a special municipality within the Kingdom of the Netherlands after the dissolution of the Netherlands Antilles on 10 October 2010 and is not part of a Dutch province. The island's constitutional status, as well as those of Sint Eustatius and Bonaire, is set out in the Law on the Public Entities BES (Dutch: Wet op de Openbare Lichamen BES).

Sabans vote for members of the Dutch House of Representatives, the members of which are elected on a party-list proportional method. During the 2017 Dutch general election, a majority of Sabans voted for Democrats 66. Of the island's 2,000 residents, 900 were eligible to vote, and of those, 42.8% (or 385 people) voted.

Sabans with Dutch nationality are allowed to vote in elections for the Electoral College to elect the members of the Dutch Senate. The 2019 elections on Saba, held concurrently with the 2019 island council elections resulted in four of the five Saban seats in the Electoral College going to the Windward Islands People's Movement and one seat going to the Saba Labour Party.

=== Governor ===
The island governor is the head of the government of Saba. The Dutch monarch appoints the governor for a term of six years. The governor falls under the supervision of the minister of the interior and kingdom relations. The island governor chairs meetings of both the Island Council and the Executive Council.

The island's governors are also responsible for representing the island's government both in and out of court, maintaining public order, implementing policy and legislation, coordinating with other governments, and receiving and handling complaints about the island's government.

The incumbent island governor is Jonathan G. A. Johnson.

=== Legislature ===
Saba's legislative body is the Island Council, of which there are five members. Councilors are elected by the citizens of the island every four years. The Island Council holds the power to:

- Appoint and remove commissioners of the Executive Council.
- Pass ordinances to be enforced by the Executive Council.
- Ask questions of the Executive Council.
- Begin an investigation into the governor or the Executive Council.
- Approve the budget.

Following the 2023 island elections, the Windward Islands People's Movement (WIPM) holds three seats on the Island Council, while the new Party for Progress, Equality, and Prosperity held two. In 2019, Esmeralda Johnson was the youngest person ever to be elected to the council.

Members of the Island Council are:

Members of the Saba Island Council, 2023–2027
Name	Party
Saskia Matthew	PEP
Julio Every	PEP
Rolando Wilson	WIPM
Elsa Peterson	WIPM
Vito Charles	WIPM

=== Executive ===
The Executive Council, appointed by the Island Council, acts as the executive branch of government. The council has the following responsibilities:

- Day-to-day administration of the island, except for duties reserved for the Island Council or the governor.
- Executing policies and legislation passed by the Island Council.
- Establishing rules regarding the administration of the island, except the Registry.
- Appointing, promoting, suspending, or dismissing public officials, except those working for and including the registrar.
- Preparing defense of the island.
- Maintaining contact with Dutch ministries in the Hague.
- Executing policies and legislation from the national government.

The council appoints the island secretary, currently Tim Muller.

The council consists of the island governor and two commissioners appointed by the Island Council, currently both members of the WIPM. Each member of the Executive Council is assigned portfolios to oversee.

Executive Council (2019–2023)
Name	Title	Party	Portfolios
Jonathan Johnson	Governor	N/A	Census (Civil Status, Registry, & Elections), Personnel Affairs & Organization, Disaster Management, Protocol, Public Safety, Communication, Digitalization & Information Technology
Rolando Wilson	Commissioner	WIPM	General Affairs, Finances & Economic Affairs, Agriculture, Husbandry & Fisheries, Planning & Infrastructure, Energy, Public Works, Constitutional Affairs, Tourism, Water Supply, Harbor, Airport, Nature & Environment, Sanitation & Waste Management
Eviton Heyliger	Commissioner	WIPM	Education, Community Development, Social & Labor Affairs, Social Housing, Health & Hygiene, Culture & Sports, Archives, Youth Affairs, Gender Affairs, Cadastre, European Union funds, Telecommunications

== Demographics ==
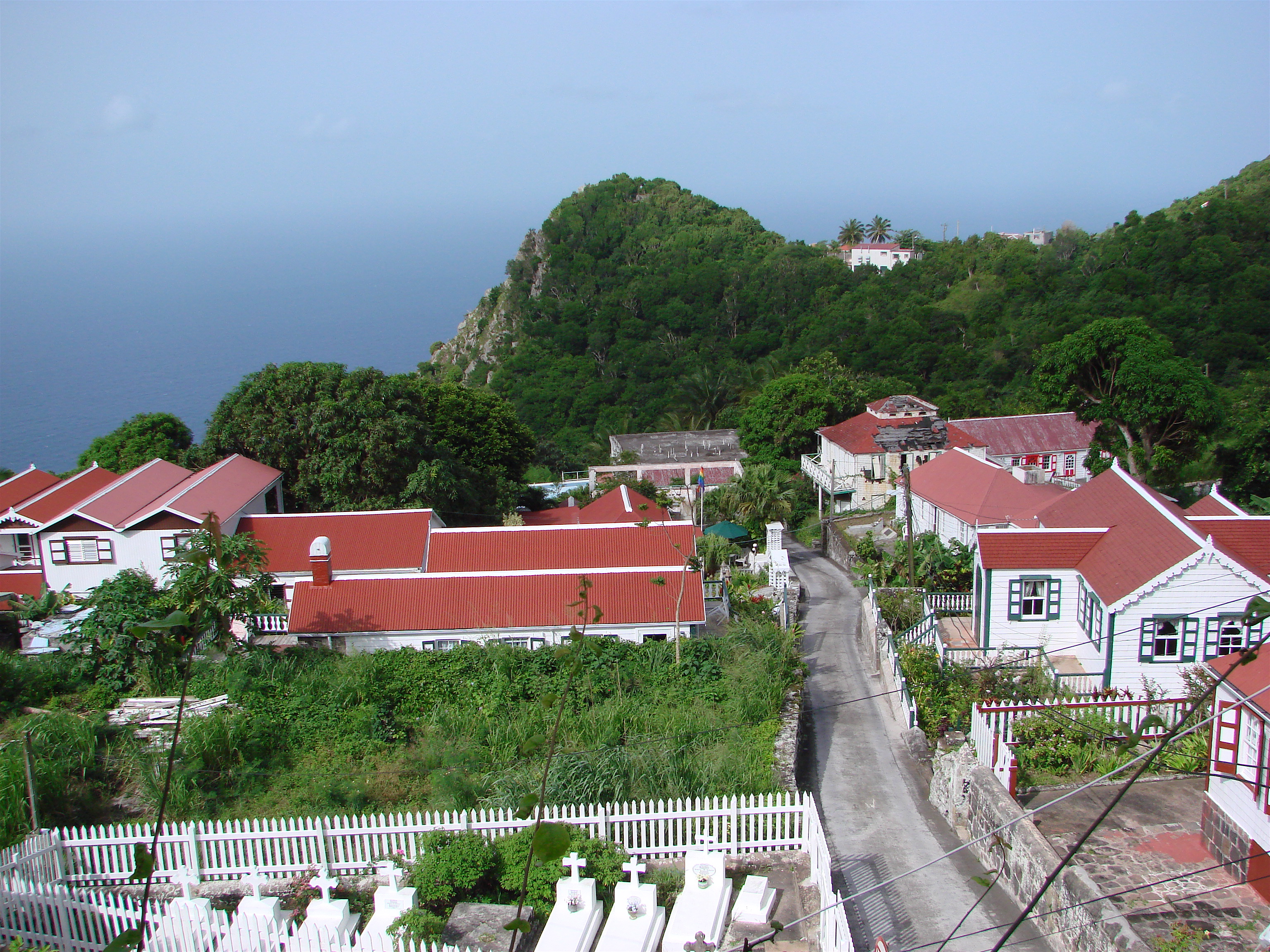
A typical view of Saba

The population of Saba was 2,158 on 1 January 2025. Saba's small size has led to a fairly small number of island families, who can trace their last names back to around a half-dozen families. This means that many last names are shared across the island, the most numerous being Hassell, Johnson and Every; these three names are shared by upwards of 30% of Saba's population.

Age Sex Pyramid

Most of Saba's population descends from the intermixing of Africans and Europeans. Most families can trace ancestry to early Dutch, English, Scottish settlers and enslaved Africans. The population is also partly descended from the Irish who were exiled from that country after the accession of King Charles I of England, Scotland and Ireland in 1625. Charles exiled these Irish to the Caribbean in an effort to quell a rebellion after he had forcibly procured their lands for his Scottish noble supporters.

Historically, Saba was traded among the many European nations that fought for power in the region. Enslaved people from Africa were also imported to work on Saba. In recent years Saba has become home to a large group of expatriates, and around 250 immigrants who are either students or teachers at the Saba University School of Medicine.

=== Languages ===
First languages of Sabans (2021)
Languages	Percent
English	83.3%
Spanish	9.9%
Dutch	4.1%
Other	2.5%

Languages spoken in Saba (2021)
Languages	Percent
English	97.6%
Dutch	33.0%
Spanish	31.8%
Other	14.0%
Papiamentu	12.3%

Both English and Dutch are spoken on the island and taught in schools, and both languages are official. Despite the island's Dutch affiliation, English is the principal language spoken on the island and has been used in its school system since the 19th century. Dutch is spoken by 34% of the population, while English is spoken by over 96% of the population.

The majority (67%) of Sabans speak more than one language, including English, Dutch, Spanish, Papiamento, and many others.

Languages spoken on Saba, by population percentage
Year	Dutch	English	Papiamento	Spanish	Others
2013	32.3%	99.6%	13.4%	27.1%	23.3%
2017/2018	34.0%	96.9%	10.7%	32.6%	25.7%

English is the medium of instruction in Saba schools. Dutch government policy towards Saba and other SSS islands promotes English-medium education. English can therefore be used in communications of and to the government.

Saban English is the local English vernacular spoken on the island. It has previously been described as a decreolized variety of Virgin Islands Creole English. The first dictionary of Saban English was published in 2016.

=== Religion ===
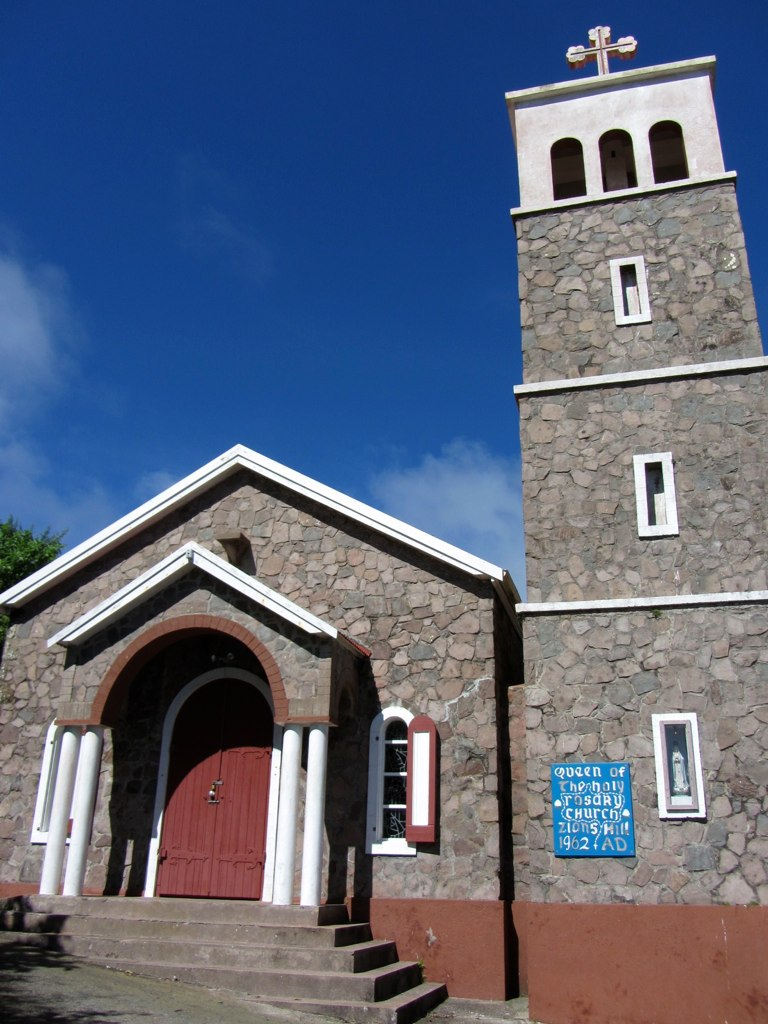
Queen of The Holy Rosary Church in Zions Hill

Saba has a predominantly Christian population. The main denominations are Catholicism (45%), Non-denominational Christianity (18%), Anglicanism (9%), Evangelicalism (4%), and Pentecostalism 4%, with an additional 11% adhering to other Christian denominations. In addition, 6% of the population is Muslim.

The first contact with Christians on the island occurred with the visit of Christopher Columbus in 1493, but this did not mean the immediate arrival of the Catholic Church. It is believed that the first Christian groups to settle on the island were Protestants coming from the Netherlands in 1640.

During the period of nominal Spanish domination, the island was included in the jurisdiction of the Diocese of Puerto Rico.

The oldest church on record is the Christuskerk (Christ Church), of the Anglican denomination, which was renovated in 1777 after being damaged by a hurricane, and whose exact date of construction is unknown. In the same year, Pastor Kirkpatrick also requested permission from the Dutch commander Johannes de Graaff to officially establish the Anglican Church in Saba before that some locals used the Reformed Church of the Netherlands to celebrate their baptisms.

Although the Roman Catholic Church is currently very active on Saba, it did not establish itself on the island until quite late. One of the earliest contacts includes the visit of Père Labat in 1701.

The island was also visited by the Prefect Apostolic of the Catholic Church for the Dutch Colonies in the Caribbean in 1836 Monsignor Martinus Niewindt, according to his report there was no Catholic priest to attend the island at that time. He returned in May of the same year with the Venezuelan priest Manuel Romero who had settled in Curaçao 1 year earlier for political reasons. Communication was difficult at first because neither of the two priests spoke English, Romero spoke only Spanish and Niewindt spoke only French and Dutch. In June 1836, the first Catholic mass on the island was officially celebrated in Saba, and five children were presented for baptism.

The oldest Catholic Church on record and still functioning today is St. Paul's Conversion Church in Windward, which dates back to 1860.

Missionary activity, the arrival of immigrants from other parts of the Netherlands and other territories in the Caribbean and Europe made the Catholic Church the most popular denomination in the present day, as it represents nearly half of the population.

On 22 June 1952, the first Jehovah's Witnesses landed on the island from the 60-foot (18 m) schooner Sibia and spent several days preaching. In 1954, the island was visited a second time by missionaries, who arrived on the Light. In 1966, the first publisher was registered on Saba Island, soon joined by a family of believers from Canada. On 28 September 2003, the Kingdom Hall in Windwardside was renovated by believers from Florida. By 2025, there were 32 Witnesses, counting baptized and sympathizing members, representing 1.52 percent of the local population.

=== Health and healthcare ===
The A.M. Edwards Medical Center is the major provider of healthcare for local residents. The center was built in 1980 and renovated in 2019. Home healthcare is available for Sabans who require medical care in their own home. Saba also has an assisted living facility located in the H.C. Every building. There is also a basic pharmacy.

Saba has a hyperbaric chamber located at Fort Bay Harbor, as scuba diving is a popular tourist activity on Saba.

=== LGBTQ rights ===
In Saba (as in Bonaire and Sint Eustatius), marriage is open to same-sex and opposite-sex couples following the entering in force of a law enabling same-sex couples to marry on 10 October 2012. The first same-sex marriage was performed on Saba on 4 December 2012 between a Dutch man and a Venezuelan man, both residing in Aruba, where same-sex marriage is not performed.

== Economy ==
Since 2011, the U.S. dollar has been the official currency, replacing the Netherlands Antillean guilder.

=== Agriculture ===
Agriculture on Saba is primarily livestock and vegetables, especially potatoes. Saba lace, also known as "Spanish work", is actually drawn thread work and is still produced on the island.

=== Tourism ===
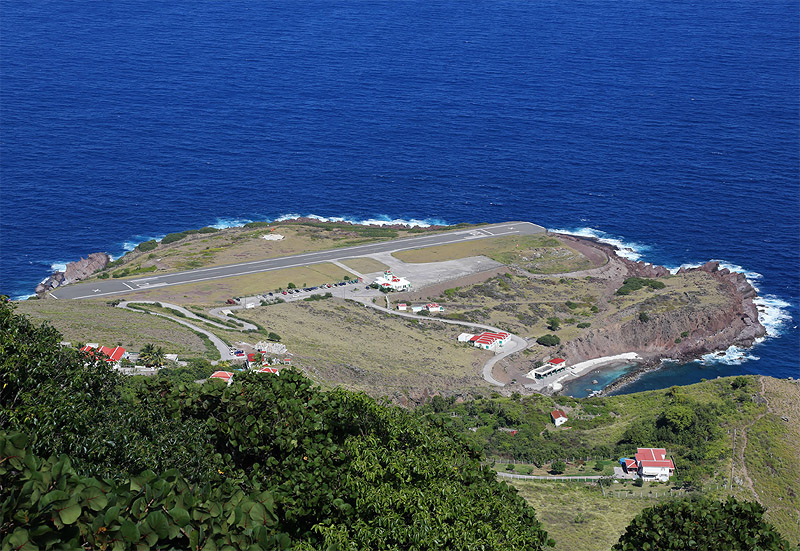
Juancho E. Yrausquin Airport, located on Flat Point

The tourism industry now contributes more to the island's economy than any other sector. There are about 15,000 visitors each year. Saba has a number of inns, hotels, rental cottages and restaurants. Saba is known as the "Unspoiled Queen" of the Caribbean. Saba is especially known for its ecotourism, having exceptional scuba diving, climbing and hiking.

The Juancho E. Yrausquin Airport offers flights to and from the nearby islands of St. Maarten and Sint Eustatius. There is also a ferry service from St. Maarten; the ferry boats "Dawn II ~ The Saba Ferry" and "The Edge" both travel to Saba three times a week. In addition, there are anchorages for private boats.

About 150 species of fish have been found in Saba's waters. A main draw for divers is the pinnacle dive sites, where magma pushed through the sea floor to create underwater towers of volcanic rock that start at about 300 feet (91 m) down and rise to about 85 feet (26 m) beneath the surface. The waters around Saba were designated as the Saba National Marine Park in 1987, and are subject to government regulation to preserve the coral reefs and other marine life. Since 1991 the Saba Conservation Foundation has operated a hyperbaric chamber in case of diving emergencies.

=== Transport ===
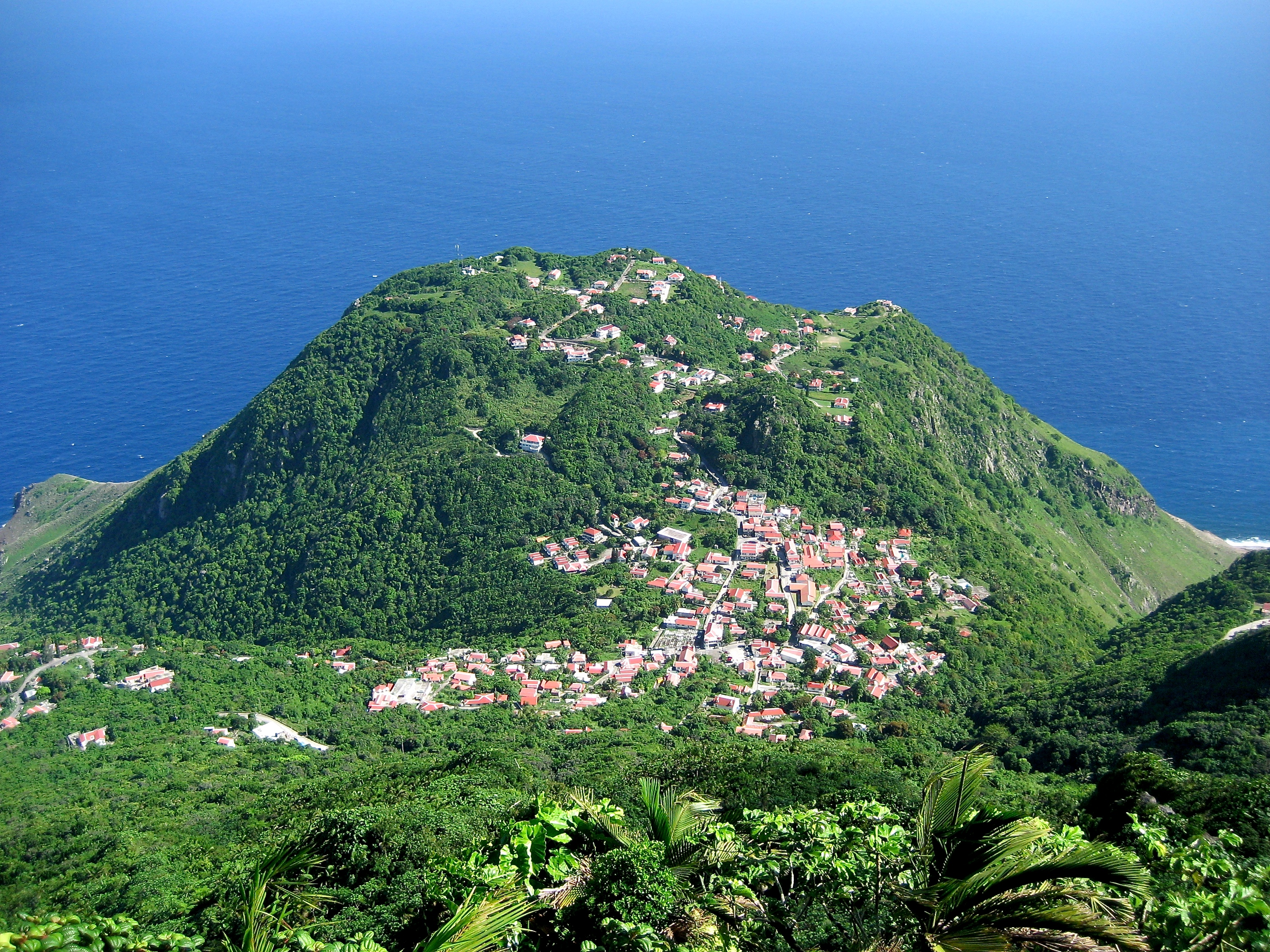
View of the village of Windwardside, taken from Mount Scenery

There is one main road, known as "The Road". Its construction was masterminded by Josephus Lambert Hassell who, contrary to the opinion of Dutch and Swiss engineers, believed that a road could be built. He took a correspondence course in civil engineering and started building the road with a crew of locals in 1938. In 1943, the first section of the road from Fort Bay to The Bottom was completed. In 1947, the first motor vehicle arrived. In 1951, the road to Windwardside and St. Johns was opened. In 1958, the road was completed.

Driving "The Road" is considered to be a daunting task, and the curves in Windwardside are extremely difficult to navigate. Driving is on the right hand side. The speed limit in towns is 20 kilometers per hour (12 mph), and outside of towns, is 40 kilometers per hour (25 mph).

In 1963, Saba residents built the Juancho E. Yrausquin Airport. This 400-meter (1,300 ft) landing strip is reputed to be the shortest commercial runway in the world, and is restricted. Only trained pilots flying small STOL airliners, such as the Twin Otter and the Britten-Norman Islander, may land there, as well as helicopters.

In 1972, a pier was completed in Fort Bay to access the island. Travel is also provided by ferry services to and from Sint Maarten with the Makana and The Edge ferries.

Of note are 800 steps carved from stone, known as "The Ladder", which reach from Ladder Bay to the settlement known as The Bottom. Until the late 20th century, everything that was brought to the island in boats and ships was carried up by hand using these steps. The steps are now often used by tourists who wish to experience an intense climb.

There is a bus system on the island, and the 2024–2029 transportation plan calls for bus shelters in every village.

=== Energy ===
Like many Caribbean islands, Saba is dependent on fossil fuels imports, which leaves it vulnerable to global oil price fluctuations that directly affect the cost of electricity. Electricity supply depends on a diesel power plant to supply 60% of the island's demand. In 2019, solar parks in Hell's Gate (adjacent to the airport) and The Bottom became operational. For up to 10 hours a day, the entire island of Saba is powered by solar energy from these two solar parks and their battery storage.

According to a report by the Low Emission Development Strategies Global Partnership (LEDS GP), the Government of Saba made the decision to transform the island to 100% sustainable energy to eventually eliminate dependence on fossil fuel-generated electricity. This new energy policy is defined by the 'Social development plan 2014–2020' and 'Saba's energy sector strategy'. Intermediate targets are 20% renewable electricity by 2017, which was reached in 2018; and 40% by 2020, which is expected to be reached by March 2019.

=== Poverty ===
There is poverty on Saba, although there is social pressure to keep this hidden. Rent is unaffordable for many local residents on the island; pressures include the high cost of utilities and groceries, as well as limited housing.

There is a heavy dependence on imported food. Grocery day is Wednesday, with food arriving from Miami each week. Local efforts at addressing food insecurity include subsidized animal feed (shipped in from Puerto Rico) and a Farmer's Market truck ("roving farmer's market"). There is also a "public–private partnership between the [Dutch] public entity and the United States–based corporation Gezondheid Farms" to increase access to hydroponically-grown local produce. Over 100 food trees were distributed at a World Food Day event in 2024.

== Education ==
The primary school is Sacred Heart Primary School in St. John's. There is also one secondary and vocational school in Saba, the Saba Comprehensive School in St. John's.

Saba University School of Medicine is a for-profit medical school located in The Bottom, Saba's capital. The medical school was established by American expatriates in coordination with the government of the Netherlands. The school adds over 400 residents when classes are in session, and it is the prime educational attraction.

== Culture ==
The lifestyle on Saba is generally slow with little nightlife, even with the emergence of an ecotourism industry in the last few decades. Sabans are proud of their history of environmental conservation, calling Saba "The Unspoiled Queen".

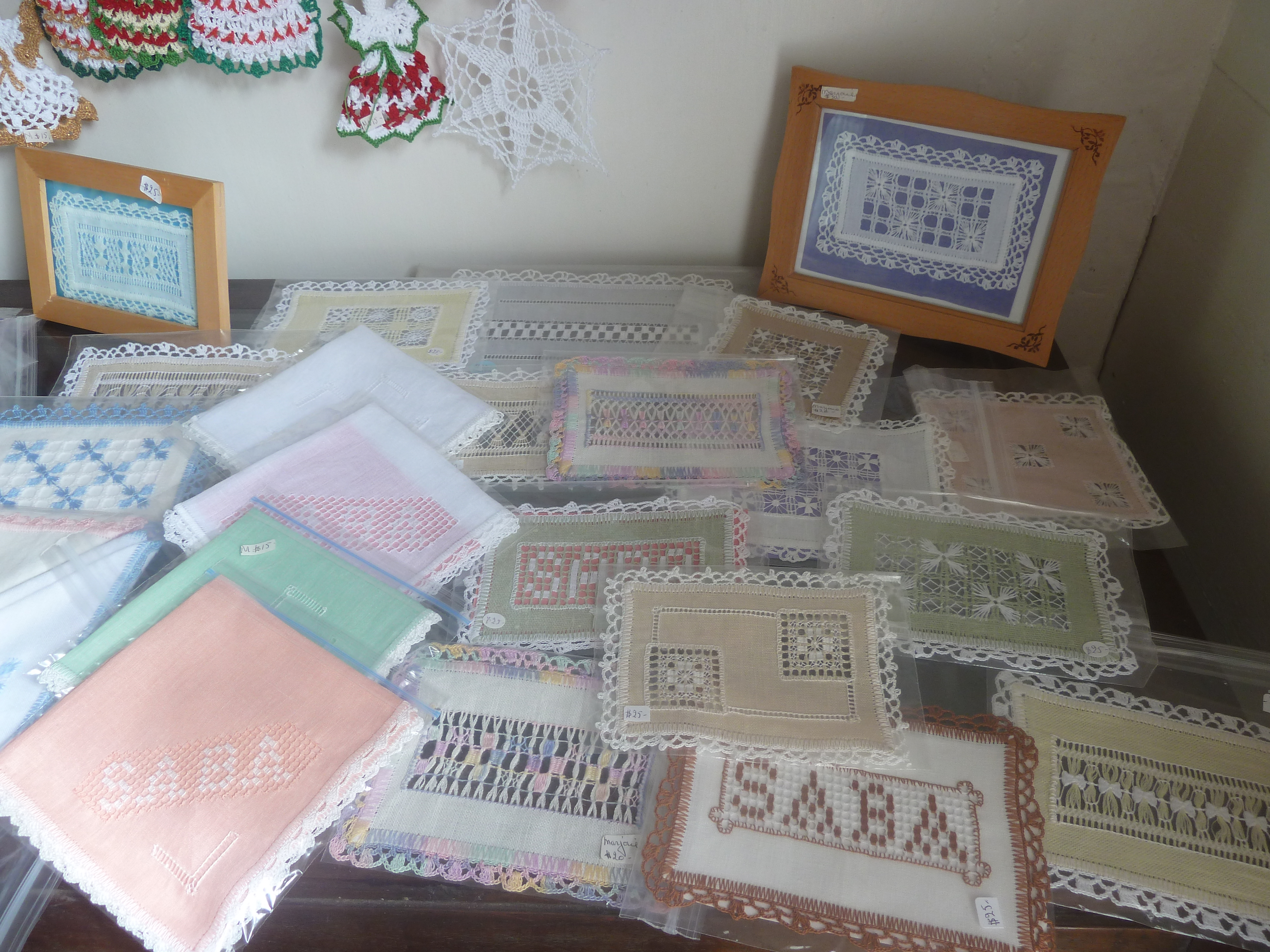
Saba lace at the Harry L Johnson Museum, Windwardside

Saban women continue to make two traditional island products, Saba Lace and Saba Spice. Saba Lace is hand-stitched lace, which the island's women began making in the late 19th century and built into a thriving mail-order business with the United States. Saba Spice is a rum drink, brewed with a combination of spices.

As in other Caribbean locations, Sabans throw an annual Carnival. Saba's Carnival takes place the last week in July and includes parades, steel bands, competitions, and food.

Another event held in the capital The Bottom is "Saba Day." This is the national day of the island in which all offices, schools and stores are closed. The island celebrates its diversity and culture through various activities and parades. The Bottom holds host to a concert at the sports field where local and other Caribbean artists come to perform. A wahoo fishing tournament is also held during Saba Day and attracts boats from neighboring islands such as St. Maarten, St. Eustatius, and St. Barths.

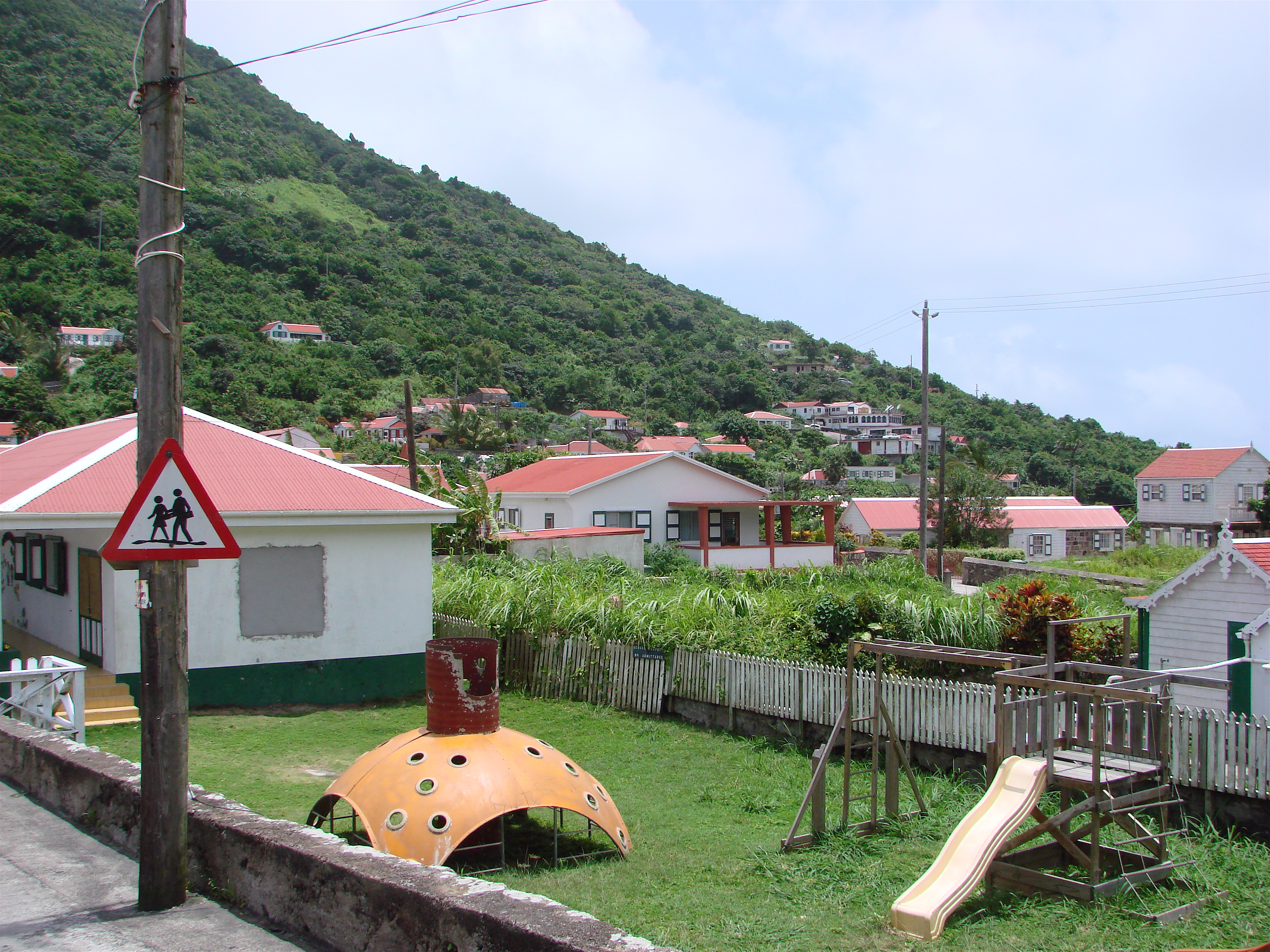
A playground on Saba

=== Media ===
There is one radio station on Saba, "Saba Radio", which broadcasts on 93.9 FM and 1410 AM.

There is one online newspaper in Saba, Saba News, which publishes local news as well as pieces from the rest of the Dutch Caribbean.

=== Museums ===
The Harry L. Johnson Museum in Windwardside features exhibits that include collections from the 19th and early 20th centuries, including period photographs of Dutch royalty, antique furniture, a 100-year old organ harmonium, and a stone hearth, as well as objects from archaeological sites of the island's first inhabitants.

The Bottom's Major Osman Ralph Simmons Museum, founded by Major Osmar Ralph Simmons, a former island police officer for more than 40 years, preserves and displays objects he found on the island.

=== Sports ===
The most popular sports on Saba are football, futsal, softball, basketball, and volleyball. The Saba Volleyball Association is a member of ECVA and NORCECA.

== People ==
- Cornelia Jones (1907–1979), innkeeper and politician
- Barbara Kassab-Every (1945–2016), Saba-born landscape painter
- Esmeralda Johnson (born 1998), politician

== Locations ==
=== Villages ===
- The Bottom (capital)
- Windwardside (village with amenities)
- Zion's Hill, formerly Hell's Gate (highest altitude village in the Kingdom of the Netherlands)
- St. Johns (village with schools for children)

=== Other land features ===
- The Road (main road)
- Juancho E. Yrausquin Airport (world's shortest commercial runway)
- Mount Scenery (formerly "The Mountain", dormant volcano)
- Flat Point (airport peninsula)

=== Bays ===
- Fort Bay (port harbor, customs and immigration)
- Well's Bay (formerly The Well Bay, with wandering beach, not used as a harbor)
- Cove Bay (recreation)
- Ladder Bay (with The Ladder Trail)

=== Other water features ===
- Flat Point Tide Pools
- Saba Bank (atoll)
- Green Island (40m x 60m islet, part of Saba's municipality)
- Saba National Marine Park
- Lighthouses in Saba (list)
