= List of lighthouses in Saba =

This is a list of lighthouses in Saba.

== Lighthouses ==
Name	Image	Year built	Location & coordinates	Class of Light	Focal height	NGA number	Admiralty number	Range nml
St. John's Lighthouse	Image	n/a	St. John's; 17°37′13.8″N 63°14′35.4″W	Fl (2) W 10s.	15 metres (49 ft)	14738	J56673	15

== See also ==
- Lists of lighthouses and lightvessels
