= Saba Bank =

Caribbean atoll, Dutch national park

Coordinates: 17°02′N 63°25′W

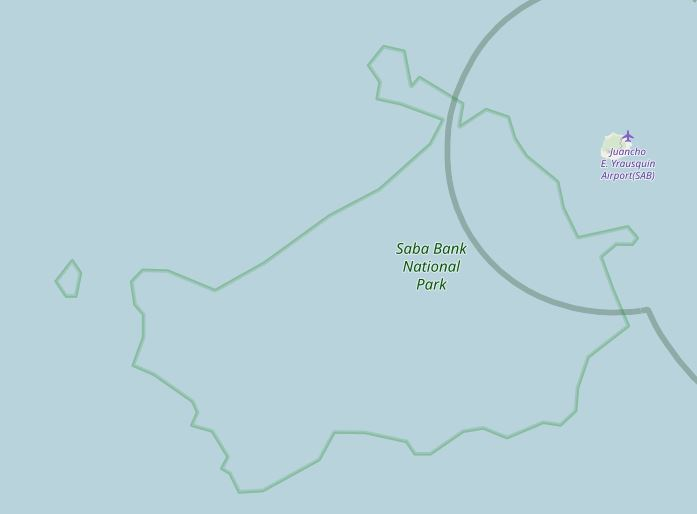
Location of Saba Bank National Park southwest of the island of Saba

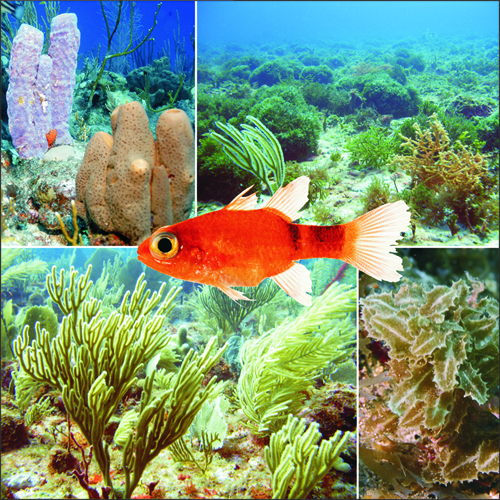
Composite of images from Saba Bank.

Saba Bank in the Caribbean Netherlands is the largest submarine atoll in the Atlantic Ocean and has some of the richest diversity of marine life in the Caribbean Sea. In 2010, it was designated as Saba Bank National Park, one of the national parks of the Netherlands, and was officially recognized as such in 2012.

The national park was established to provide protection to the biodiversity of the bank. The marine life there consists of humpback whales, sea turtles, over 200 species of fish, and many kinds of sea birds. The bank is highly valued to other close reefs, acting as a source of coral larvae and fish that then spread throughout nearby coral reefs in the region. In the past, the bank has been damaged by anchors from ships and tankers while loading oil, and began to deteriorate in color and size.

The Saba Bank, several kilometers to the south of the island of Saba, covers more than 2,400 km^{2} (930 sq mi) and is therefore the largest protected nature area in the Netherlands. The bank lies completely underwater and is important from both a biological and economic perspective.

== Geography ==
The northeastern side of Saba Bank lies about 4.3 km (2.7 mi) southwest of the island of Saba. It is raised about 1,000 metres (3,300 ft) above the general depths of the surrounding sea floor. With a length of 60 to 65 km (37 to 40 mi) and a width of 30 to 40 km (19 to 25 mi), the atoll's total surface area is approximately 2,200 km^{2} (850 sq mi), and measures from 11–200 metres (36–656 ft) deep, 1,600 km^{2} (620 sq mi) of which is shallower than 50 metres (160 ft).

From northeast, the bank extends about 55 km (34 mi) southwest, with a least reported depth of 7.3 metres (24 ft) located about 15 km (9.3 mi), southwest of Mount Scenery. A depth of 8.2 metres (27 ft) lies about 16 km (9.9 mi) south of the island. The eastern side of the bank is fringed with a ridge of living coral, sand and rock, nearly 48 km (30 mi) in length. The depths over the ridge range from 11 to 35 metres (36 to 115 ft). Westward of this ridge, except for a few 16.5-metre (54 ft) and 18.3-metre (60 ft) deep coral patches near the south side of the bank and a 16.4-metre (54 ft) deep patch near the west end of the bank, the bottom is clear white coral sand with depths from 21.9 to 36.6 metres (72 to 120 ft), gradually increasing towards the edge of the bank, but ending abruptly in depths of 54.9 metres (180 ft). In depths of under 20 metres (66 ft), the bottom can be distinctly seen.

== Largest and deepest marine sinkholes in the world ==
In 2019, the Royal Netherlands Institute for Sea Research (NIOZ) and Wageningen Marine Research organized an expedition to the Saba Bank, close to the Dutch island of Saba. Expert researchers gathered data to acquire more knowledge about sinkholes. In 2018, the same group of researchers discovered more than 20 enormous holes ranging from 10 to 375 metres (33 to 1,230 ft) in depth and with diameters varying between 70 and 1,100 metres (230 and 3,610 ft). The floor of the Saba Bank consists of a limestone deposition 1 to 2 kilometres (0.62 to 1.24 mi) thick. When the bank lay above water during the ice ages and the sea level was 120 metres (390 ft) lower than it is now, flowing freshwater dissolved the limestone and created large holes. This first led to the formation of caves, which subsequently collapsed. Interestingly enough, these sinkholes that developed on land were subsequently submerged after the last ice age (20,000 years ago), when the sea level rose again. Later, researchers discovered that the sinkhole seemed to seep gas. Researchers then obtained coordinates of a purported hot-spring in one of the sinkholes that could have possibly seeped methane.

== Politics ==
About one-third of Saba Bank lies within the Saba territorial waters, a 12-nautical-mile (22 km) zone. Around it is an Exclusive Economic Zone of the Netherlands of 200 nautical miles (370 km) outside the coastal baseline, which replaced the Economic Fisheries Zone established before the dissolution of the Netherlands Antilles.
