= St. Johns, Saba =

Village in Saba, Dutch Caribbean

St. Johns
- Village
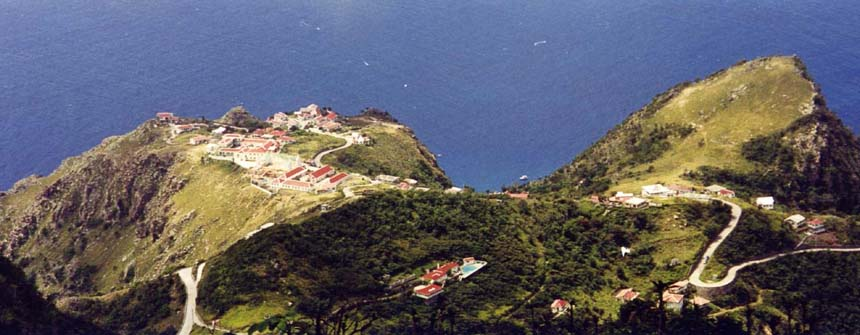
- St. John's village as seen from Mount Scenery

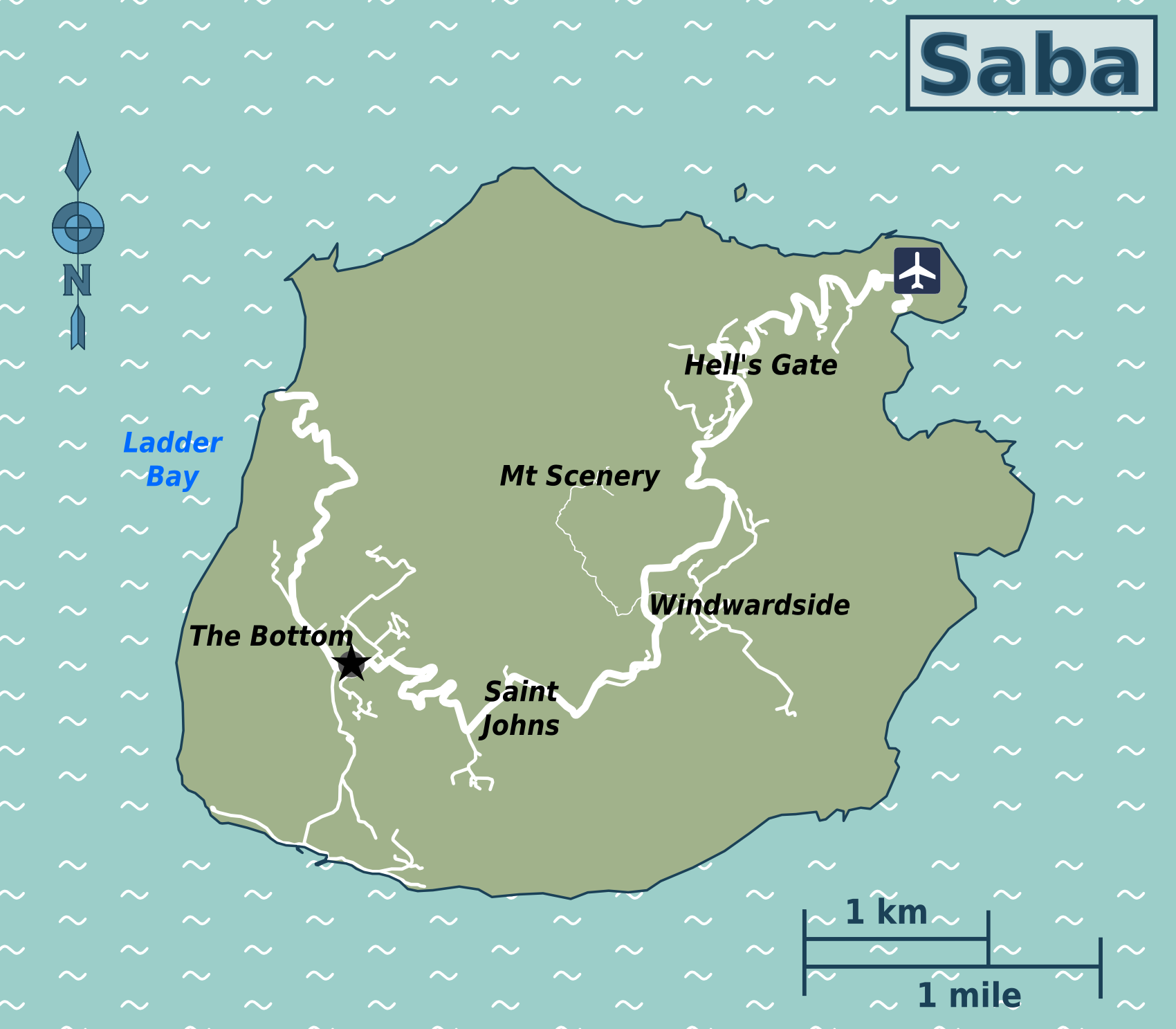
- Map of Saba showing St. Johns
- Coordinates: 17°37′13.36″N 63°14′35.1″W
- Country: Netherlands
- Public body: Saba

Population (2001)
  - Total: 186
- Time zone: UTC-4 (AST)

St. Johns (or St. John's) is a settlement on the island of Saba, in the Caribbean Netherlands. It is located between the island's two largest settlements of The Bottom and Windwardside. St. John's is the smallest of Saba's four villages, with a population of 186 (in 2001). The village was the birthplace of Cornelia Jones, the first woman to hold public office in the Windward Islands. It is the current location of Saba's primary and secondary schools, making it the center of the Island's education. It is also one of the island's seismic monitoring sites.

== Geography ==
Upper Saint Johns is located on St. Johns Hill, and Lower St. Johns is located on a promontory called St. Johns Flat. St. Johns Flat is one of Saba's multiple volcanic domes, about 318 metres (1,043 ft) above sea level. St. Johns also includes the unpopulated Thais Hill.

== History ==
Between 400 and 1450 A.D., St. Johns was the site of a small village. Three other villages on the island during this era were in The Bottom, Windwardside, and Spring Bay. The inhabitants of these villages likely ate root vegetables and fish. Archeological findings reveal that these people used rock, animal bone, shell, and coral to make tools, pottery, and sculptures.

In the 17th century, Saba was settled by Dutch, English, Irish, and Scottish settlers. St. Johns was settled by Europeans mostly of Irish descent. By the 1860s, St. Johns was one of 7 main districts, with The Bottom, Windwardside, Booby Hill, Hell's Gate, Mary's Point (Palmetto Point), and Middle Island. St. Johns district had its own elected head, as did the other districts.

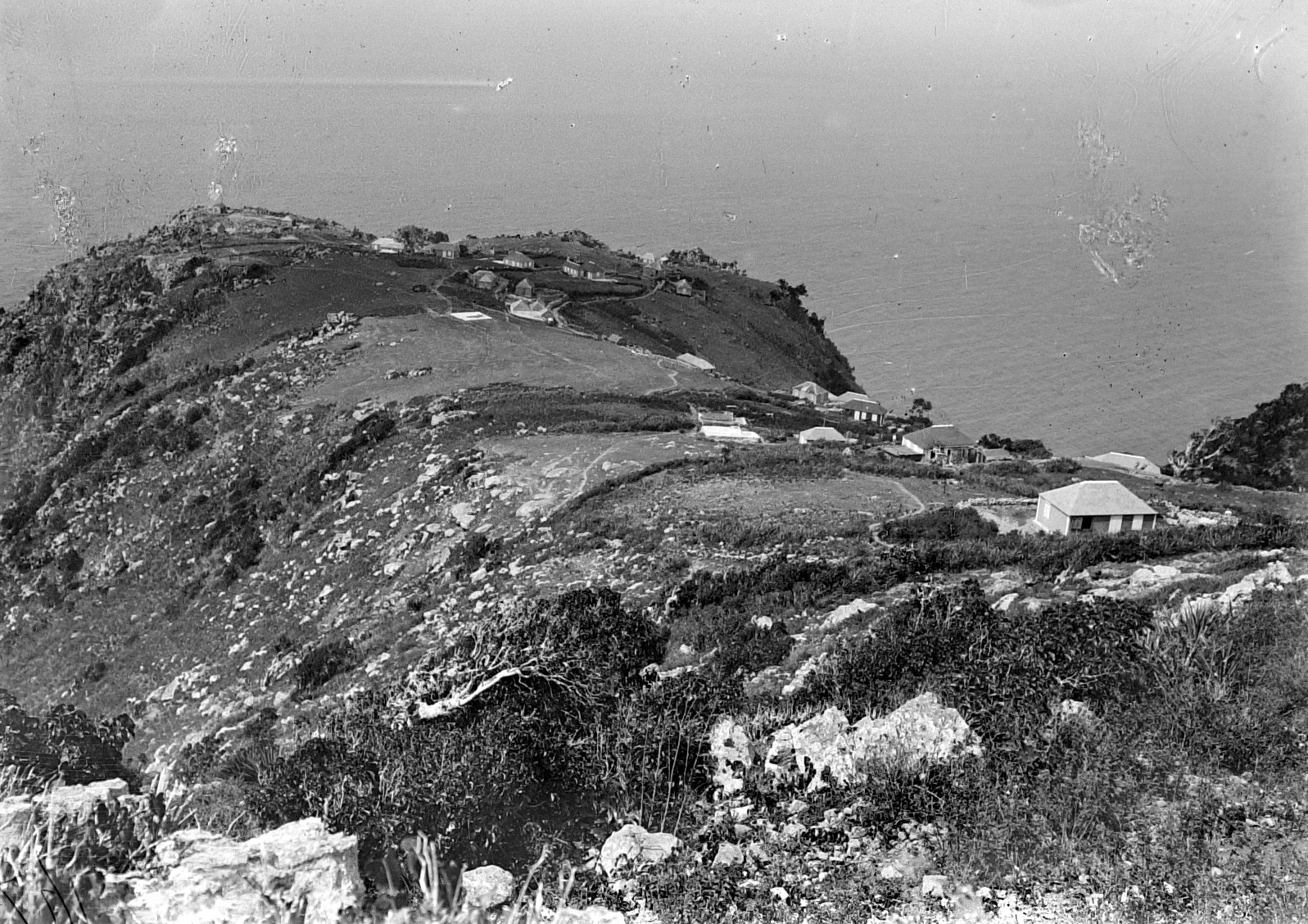
Photo of St. Johns taken between 1909 and 1910

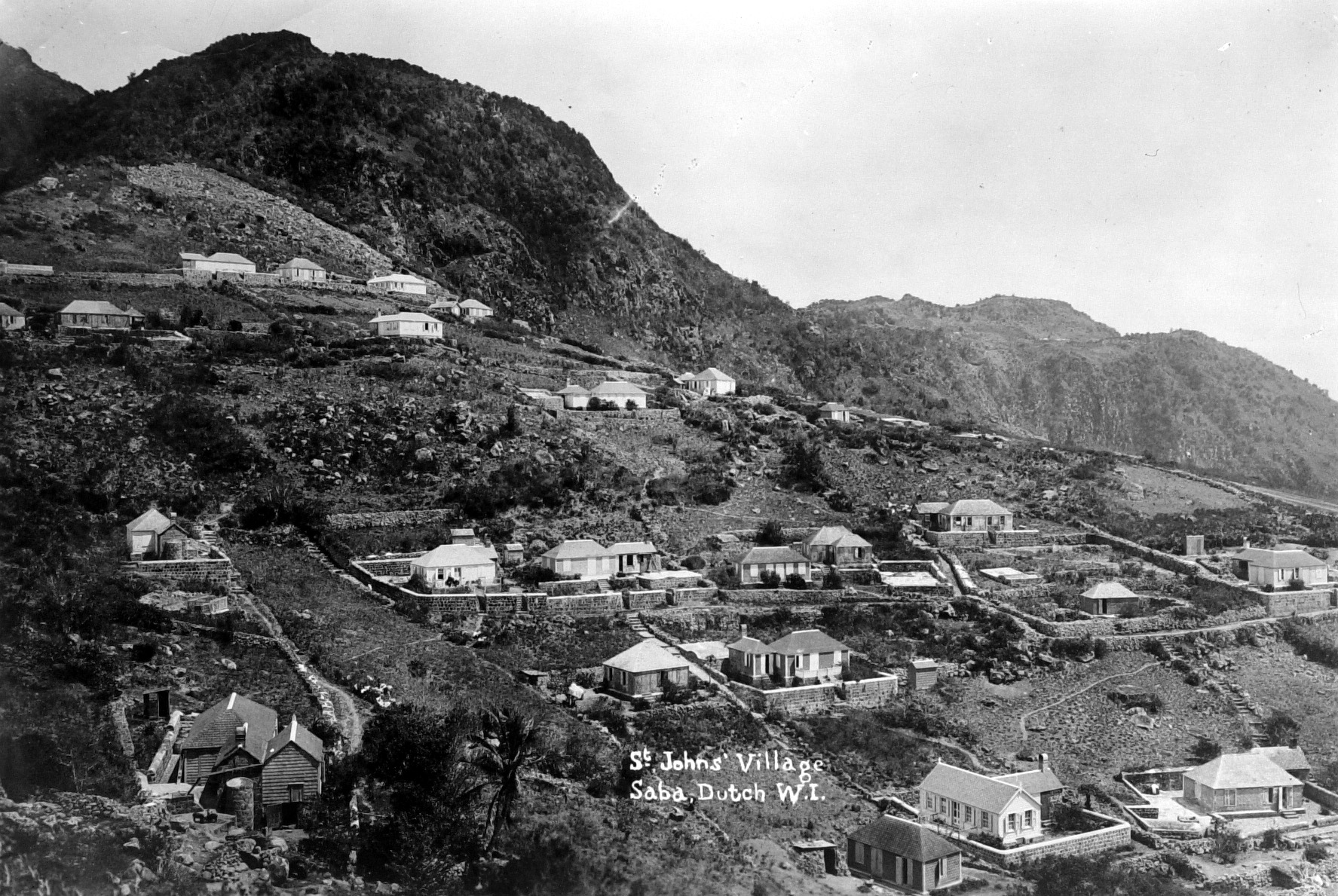
Photo of St. Johns village, taken between 1910 and 1940

Throughout the 18th, 19th, and early 20th centuries, most men in St. Johns engaged in farming (in an area known as "Little Rendez-Vous") or fishing. Most women engaged in domestic work in the home. By 1900, St. Johns was one of four main villages on Saba, along with The Bottom, Windwardside, and Hell's Gate. By 1932, the population of St. Johns was 245. However, the early/mid-1900s saw extensive emigration from Saba, and by 1972, the population of St. Johns had decreased to 101 inhabitants.

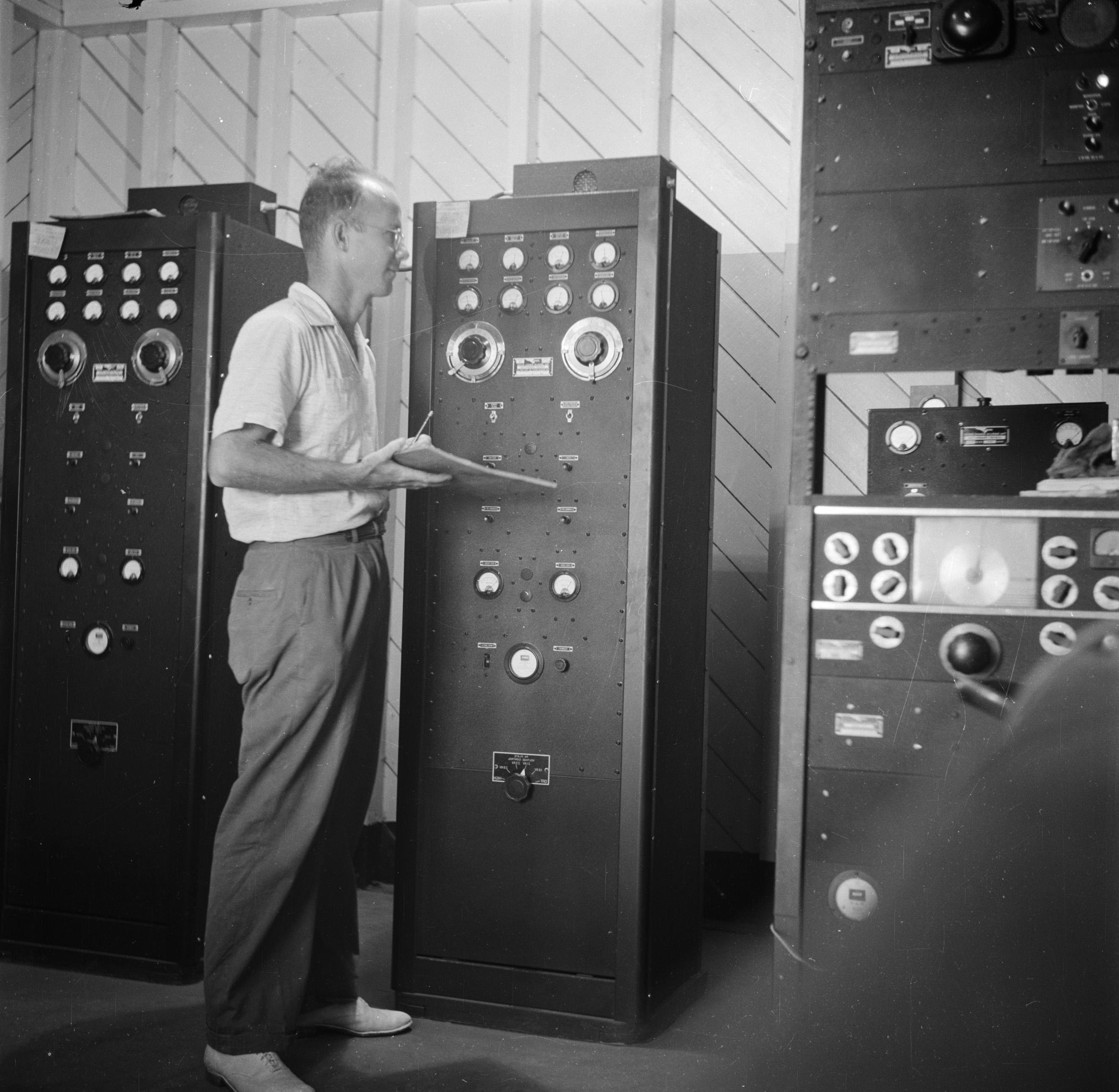
Inside the transmission center on Thais Hill, St. Johns

In the mid-20th century, St. John's saw many technological and infrastructural developments. In the 1940s, Pan Am operated a communications station and beacon on Thais Hill in St. Johns. In 1951, "The Road", which had connected Fort Bay to The Bottom, had extended to St. Johns and Windwardside. The following year, St. Johns was the site of Saba's first aircraft landing, when a helicopter from a Dutch aircraft carrier landed there. In 1960, Princess Irene Hospital opened in St. Johns. In 1964, public electricity reached St. John's. Additionally, St. John's Lighthouse was constructed in Upper St. Johns.

In 1980, Princess Irene Hospital was converted into Saba's secondary school, where it still is today, and the hospital was moved to The Bottom. Soon thereafter, Saba's primary school was transferred to its present-day location in St. Johns.

== Sights ==
St. Johns is mostly a residential area, but it is also the location of Sacred Heart School (primary) and Saba Comprehensive School (secondary). Attached to the Sacred Heart School is a small chapel that is run by Father Janssen. It is common to see the chapel used by the school on weekdays for religious class and on Sunday for mass.

Multiple hiking trails are accessible from or near St. Johns:

- Thais Hill Trail (25 minutes round-trip) starts in St. Johns and goes to the stop of Thais Hill. It has views of The Bottom and Fort Bay, as well as St. Eustatius, St. Kitts, and Nevis.
- Dancing Place Trail (20 minutes one-way) is located between the villages of Windwardside and St. Johns. It begins on The Road by the monument to "The Road that Couldn't Be Built". It has views of Giles Quarter and Saba's southern coast, as well as St. Eustatius, St. Kitts, and Nevis.

== Volcanic monitoring ==
Saba's volcano is currently dormant, and St. Johns Flat is one of the island's sites for seismic monitoring. This includes a Seismic Broad-Band (3D) monitoring Station. In January 2018, the Royal Netherlands Meteorological Institute installed a Global Navigation Satellite System (GNSS) instrument at St. Johns.; they installed a second GNSS instrument at the airport the following year.

== Gallery ==
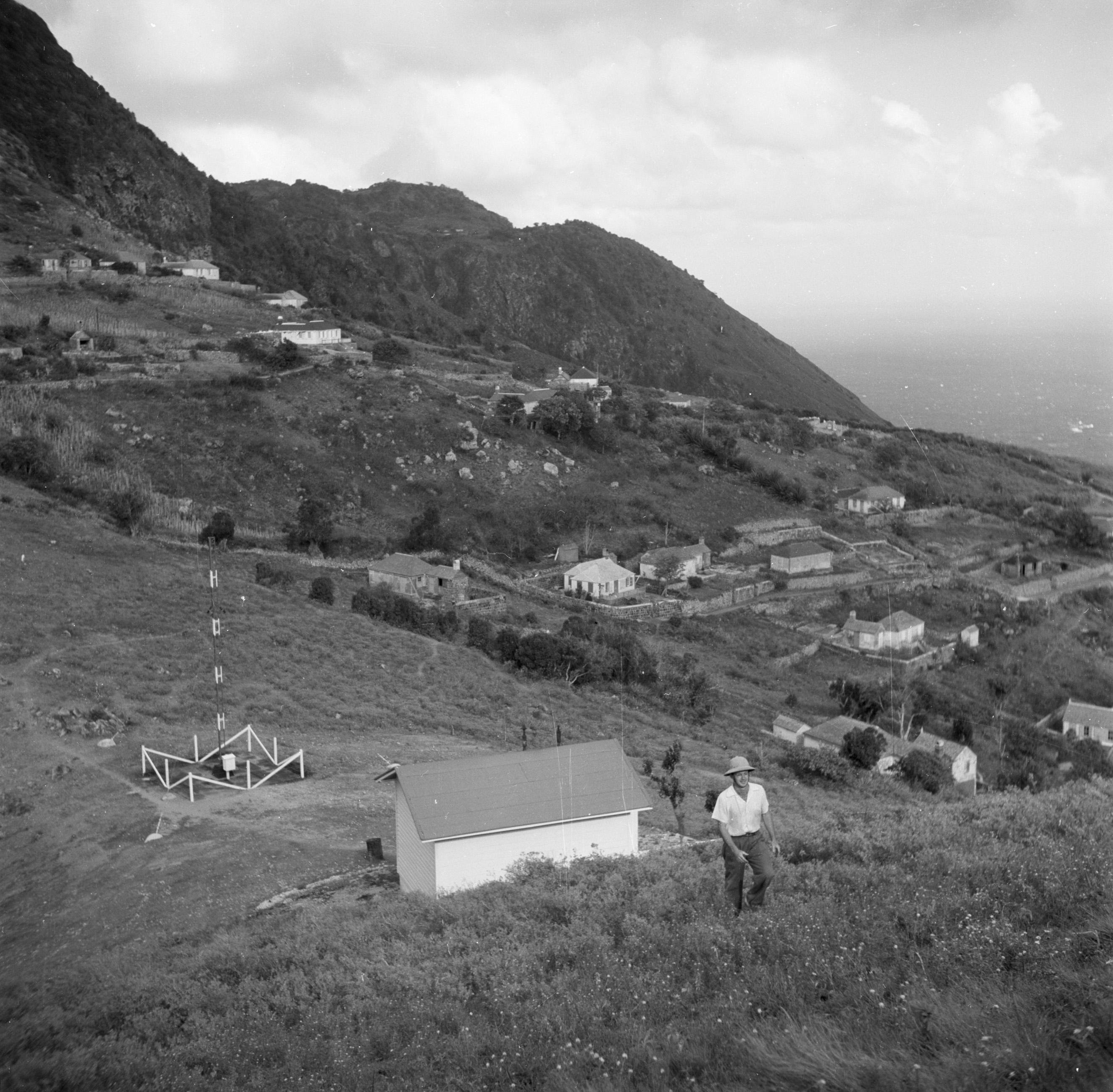
Photo of St. Johns, taken from Thais Hill (1947)

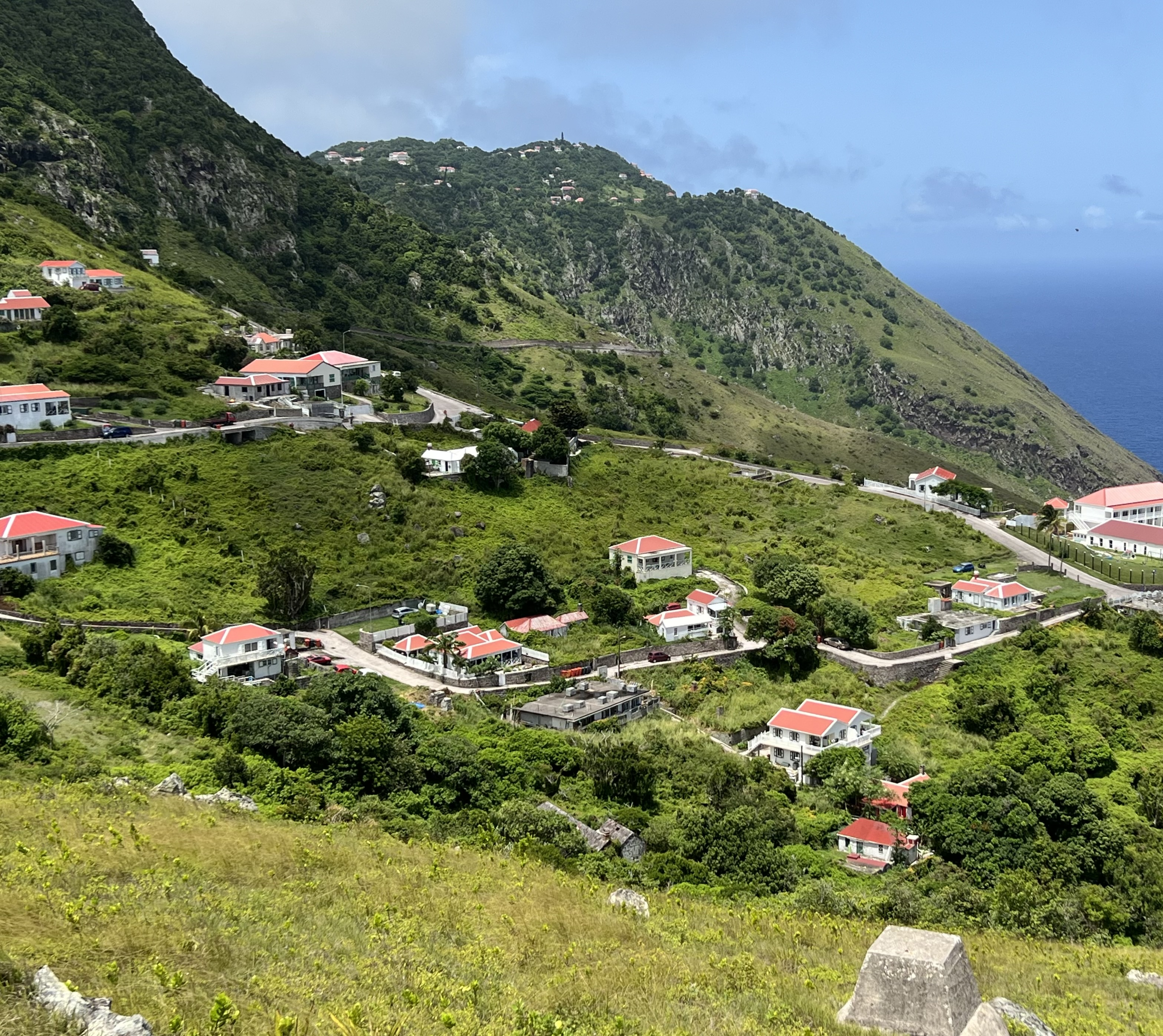
Photo of St. Johns, taken from Thais Hill (2024)

== See also ==
- Mount Scenery
