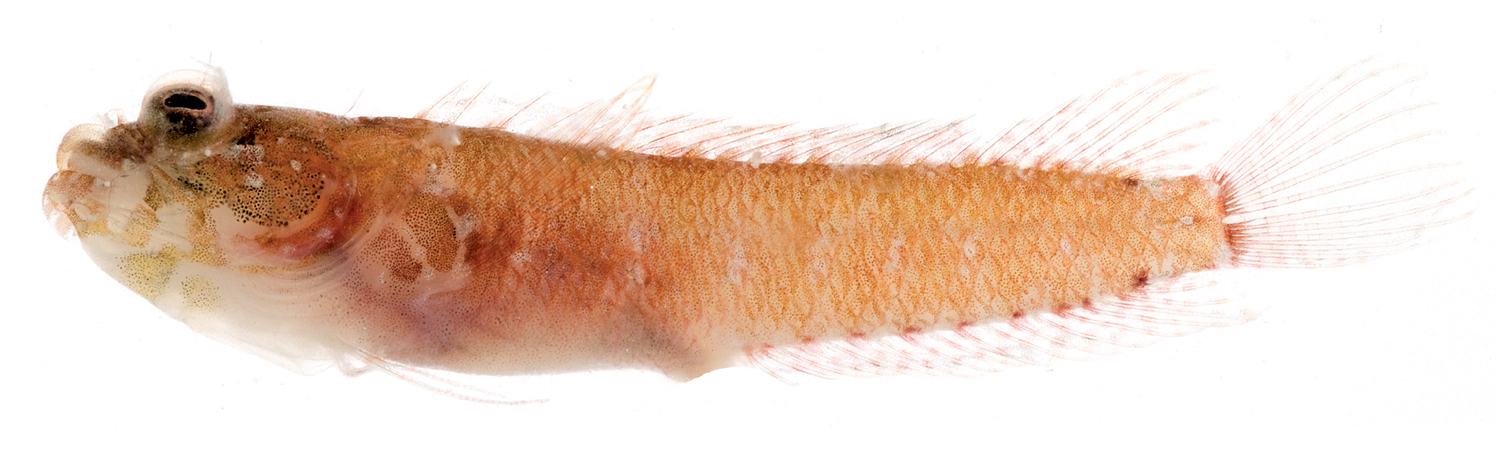
- Female (length 25 mm)

Conservation status
- Least Concern (IUCN 3.1)

Scientific classification
- Kingdom: Animalia
- Phylum: Chordata
- Class: Actinopterygii
- Order: Blenniiformes
- Family: Labrisomidae
- Genus: Starksia
- Species: S. lepicoelia

Binomial name
- Starksia lepicoelia J. E. Böhlke & V. G. Springer, 1961
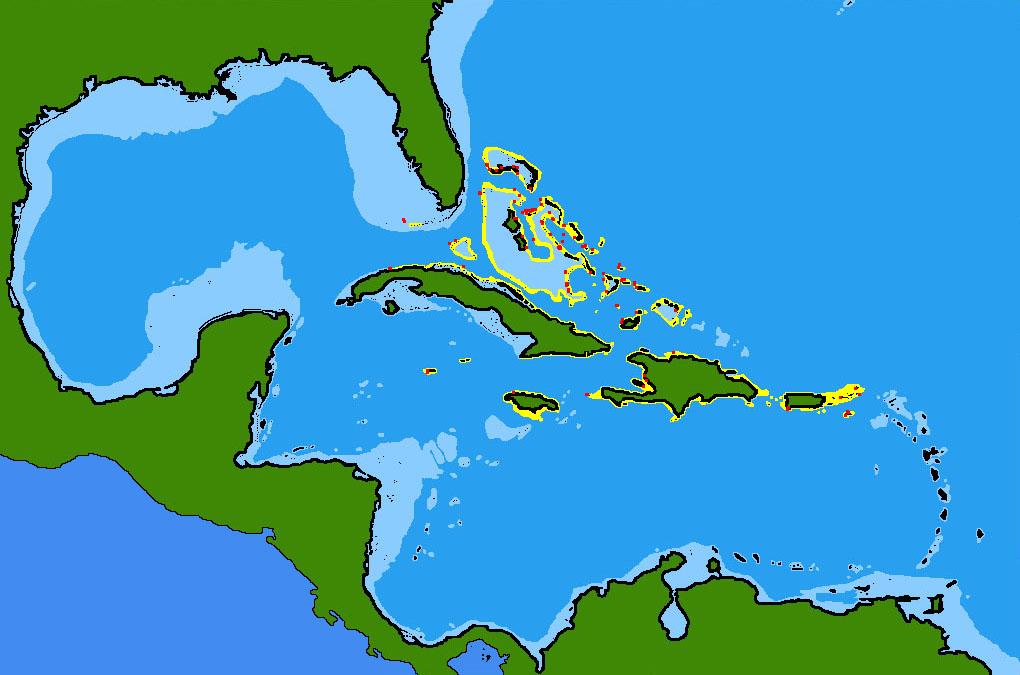

= Starksia lepicoelia =

Species of fish

Starksia lepicoelia, known commonly as the blackcheek blenny, is a species of labrisomid blenny native to the Caribbean Sea and adjacent Atlantic Ocean. It inhabits coral reefs and can be found at depths of from 8 to 20 m (26 to 66 ft). This species can reach a length of 3.4 cm (1.3 in) TL.
