= Mary, Mungo and Midge =

British animated children's TV series

- Genre: Animated
- Voices of: Richard Baker; Isabel Ryan
- Theme music composer: Johnny Pearson
- Opening theme: Mini Walking (from The Mini Suite)
- Ending theme: Mini Movement (from The Mini Suite)
- Country of origin: United Kingdom
- Original language: English
- No. of seasons: 1
- No. of episodes: 13

Production
- Producer: John Ryan
- Camera setup: Single-camera
- Running time: 15 minutes
- Production company: John Ryan Studios

Original release
- Network: BBC1
- Release: 7 October – 30 December 1969

Mary, Mungo and Midge is a British animated children's television series, created by John Ryan and produced by the BBC in 1969.

The show featured the adventures of a girl called Mary, her dog Mungo, and her pet mouse Midge, who lived with Mary's parents in a tower block in a busy town. BBC newsreader Richard Baker was the narrator and the voices of both Mungo and Midge. John Ryan's daughter Isabel provided the voice of Mary. The theme tune and other music for the series were provided by Johnny Pearson, drawn from the KPM Music Library, specifically the LP 'Children and Animation' (KPM1045, 1969)

This show was one of the first children's shows in the UK to reflect urban living. The programme showed Mary and her animal friends having adventures in a busy town, as opposed to in a wood, forest or other rural setting, apart from the episode “The Garage,” in which the family had a picnic in the countryside. The two featured animals were likely to be familiar to town dwellers, as opposed to the array of talking wildlife usually seen in children's television.

In each episode, the three of them would descend in the lift from their flat in the tower block. After their adventures, they would return home. Midge would press the button for the lift back to the correct floor by standing on Mungo's nose.

Mary, Mungo and Midge was a production of John Ryan Studios, who also produced the earlier Captain Pugwash and the later The Adventures of Sir Prancelot series, both with a similar drawing style.

However, despite never being renewed for a second season—with the Watch with Mother title being dropped in 1975—it continued to air as repeats on BBC1 up until 1978, with the last annual book (for 1975) being released in 1974. The Complete Mary, Mungo and Midge was released on DVD on 5 April 2004.

== Episodes ==
No.	Title	Original release date
1	"The Crane"	7 October 1969
Mary, Mungo and Midge notice a crane outside and the two animals go on an adventure inside.
2	"The Letter"	14 October 1969
Mary allows Mungo and Midge to post a letter for her to Grandma but Midge falls inside the letterbox and goes on a wild journey.
3	"The Boat"	21 October 1969
Midge sails Mary's boat in the pond, but has to be rescued when the wind drops.
4	"Printing"	28 October 1969
Mary and Mungo are printing and then go to the shops, whilst Midge travels with them to a printing factory.
5	"Clocks"	4 November 1969
Midge breaks the clock in the hall so men are hired to fix it, whilst he climbs aboard.
6	"Mungo Lost"	11 November 1969
Mungo thought he could go and see Mary where she went to see her aunt who had just moved to a new house, but Mungo got really lost so he decided to ask a policeman to take him home while Midge was looking for him.
7	"Machines"	18 November 1969
Midge wonders where cows fit in the machine, but he causes chaos with all the milk coming out of the machine.
8	"Toy Shop"	25 November 1969
Midge climbs inside Mary's broken doll when she and Mungo go to the toy-shop for it to be mended.
9	"The Fair"	2 December 1969
The family go to the funfair.
10	"Flying"	9 December 1969
Midge flies in a balloon in the park whilst Mary flies her kite.
11	"The Garage"	16 December 1969
Midge is left in the garage whilst the rest of the family go into the country for a picnic.
12	"Hospital"	23 December 1969
Midge secretly follows Mary into the hospital after she injures her leg.
13	"Seaside"	30 December 1969
The family go to the seaside and Mary, Mungo and Midge go their separate ways. Midge goes to sleep with his flute.
