= Peter Hawkins =

English actor (1924–2006)

- Hawkins in 1996
- Born: Peter John Hawkins; 3 April 1924; Brixton, London, England
- Died: 8 July 2006 (aged 82); London, England
- Occupations: Actor, voice artist
- Years active: 1949–1992
- Spouse: Rosemary Miller (m. 1956)
- Children: 1

Peter John Hawkins (3 April 1924 – 8 July 2006) was a British actor whose career spanned from the mid-1940s to the early 1990s. Following his breakthrough in Royal Navy theatre performances subsequent to his survival of the sinking of HMS Limbourne, he developed into one of the most sought-after voice artists in the United Kingdom.

He was best known for his vocal contributions to children's television series; this began with voicing Mr Turnip in the magazine series Whirligig. Hawkins voiced the title characters in Flower Pot Men, for which he invented their signature "Oddle Poddle" gibberish language, Spotty Dog in The Woodentops, all the characters in Captain Pugwash and The Adventures of Sir Prancelot, the narrator of SuperTed, and many of the characters in The Family-Ness, Jimbo and the Jet-Set and Penny Crayon. He also originated the role of Zippy in Thames Television's Rainbow.

Outside children's programming, he was well known for providing the original voices for the Daleks in Doctor Who, as well as being part of the ensemble cast for the sketch series Dave Allen at Large and voicing characters in commercials including the Smash Martians and Money in Access's "Your Flexible Friend" campaign.

== Early life ==
Peter John Hawkins was born on 3 April 1924 in Hargwyne Street in Brixton, south London, to Detective Inspector John Stephen and piano player Doris Matilda Hawkins. According to his son Silas, his father's talent was derived from his mother's ability to mimic others; Hawkins made his first stage appearance as a member of the chorus in a musical. During his last year at school, he wrote, with three friends, a revue entitled The Five Bs, the name of their form. He worked at Pitman's from the ages of 16 to 18, writing similar shows at a youth club. Hawkins joined the Royal Navy, entertaining with impressions for which he wrote scripts, and survived when HMS Limbourne sank after being torpedoed escorting the cruiser Charybdis near Guernsey. He was rescued by Ronnie Hill, a theatre actor at the time, and while recovering, Hawkins took part in plays, which resulted in his being taken into Combined Operations' Entertainments productions of the Royal Naval Barracks' Scran Bag.

== Career ==
Following his time with Scran Bag, Hawkins won a two-year place at the Central School of Speech and Drama, and in 1949, his television career began with an adaptation of J. B. Priestley's The Good Companions. He began his long association with children's television with the magazine programme Whirligig portraying several characters, most notably as the voice of puppet Mr Turnip. Hawkins joined the show after being asked by the producer of a children's serial he was playing the villain for.

In 1952, Hawkins became the voices of both Bill and Ben, the Flower Pot Men, himself devising their Oddle-Poddle language. He made Bill's voice higher-pitched and Ben's lower to distinguish them, and praised the puppetry of Audrey Atterbury. The scripts would be written in English, and Peter would translate them into Oddle-Poddle, creating words similar to "Slogalog" (Slowcoach the Tortoise) and "Haddap" (Hello). He, Audrey and Gladys Whitred would keep in touch for at least thirty years afterwards.

In 1956, Hawkins married actress Rosemary Miller, who he met doing voices on Toytown. Hawkins was Ernest the Policeman, and reprised the role for the 1972 series. Hawkins would also meet Roy Skelton during Toytown, becoming a close friend. He would also be offered the role of a doctor in Miller's star series Emergency Ward 10, although due to his many voice roles, he was unable to appear.

One of his best-known roles was all the voices in Captain Pugwash. Creator John Ryan praised him for his ability to perform many different voices, although he had to be hidden behind a monitor due to his facial expressions distracting the animators. Because of this, he could write down notes about incidental characters in the script and be reminded by them appearing onscreen.

Hawkins gained a reputation for pulling off difficult character voices, which led to him being cast as the Daleks in Doctor Who in 1963. After a trial session he settled on a monotone, which caused worry among executives that it would become monotonous. He solved this problem by raising the voice's pitch whenever the Daleks got angry. Hawkins would voice the Daleks in every subsequent 1960s story they appeared in, as well as the two 1960s feature films, The Curse of the Daleks stage play and Out of the Unknown, and he and fellow Dalek voice David Graham would become lifelong friends; star William Hartnell and guest star Kevin Stoney would also strike up a relationship. Despite his son Silas being a Doctor Who fan, he did not find it strange that it was his father voicing the Daleks, although the Daily Express framed it as if he boasted to his friends about it, which Hawkins hated.

In 1966, Hawkins voiced the Cybermen in the fourth and final part of the Doctor Who serial The Tenth Planet, originated by Roy Skelton. For the subsequent three Cyberman serials he used an electrolarynx, which he described as very uncomfortable. He never returned afterwards, as he had enough of having to fund it himself. He was, however, considered to be the voice of K9 before John Leeson, with whom Hawkins had worked with on the first year of Thames Television's Rainbow, won the role.

One of his most prominent live-action roles in the period was 1965's The Big Spender, for which he grew and curled his hair for three months. As well, throughout the late 1950s and early 1960s he appeared in many advertising magazine programmes. In 1969 he played an Albanian interpreter speaking English in The Power Game, which he considered his hardest role to play.

In 1972, Hawkins joined the ensemble of Dave Allen at Large for the second series, even writing various skits, and remaining for its third and fourth. He provided the original voice of Zippy in Rainbow, which began that same year. In the pilot, he also voiced Sunshine, Bramble and Pillar, but after many policy changes they were removed. He tried to rewrite gags, which proved hard for the target audience, and so left the series, despite being asked to stay. He was eventually replaced by Roy Skelton, whom he recommended.

Throughout the 1980s, as well as providing voices in SuperTed, The Family-Ness and Jimbo and the Jet-Set, Hawkins reprised his roles of Bill and Ben for various shows, including Six Fifty-Five Special and Blue Peter. His treatment of voice overs like his acting parts (the right voice for a character appearing if the right ideas were thought) allowed him to reprise the roles. In 1988 he, his wife Rosemary Miller and David Graham did voices together for the English dub of the German animated film Stowaways on the Ark.

Due to Hawkins' role as Spotty Dog in The Woodentops, he was chosen by Nick Park to voice Gromit in his short film A Grand Day Out. He eventually decided to make Gromit a mute character to save on the effort required to animate his mouth, instead using his eyes and monobrow to communicate. None of Hawkins' original dialogue has been publicly released. Although Gromit snores and whimpers in A Grand Day Out, whether or not these were recorded by him is unconfirmed.

Silas believed his father had the most involvement with the Flower Pot Men, although he also enjoyed the diverse cast of Captain Pugwash, being very proud when it appeared in The Times as a crossword clue: "The captain is all for the dog having a bath". By comparison, when it was claimed Hilda Brabban created the Flower Pot Men, Hawkins immediately wrote a rebuttal. According to Silas, Hawkins gave thought to every role, yet never looked back at them.

== Personal life ==
Hawkins was interested in jewellery, fossils, "serious" music and eating out. He supported Chelsea. He used his record collection to expand his vocal range, and also had a collection of Japanese sword guards and Impressionist works, including those of Pierre-Auguste Renoir, Camille Pissarro and Claude Monet, much to the delight of Gale Pedrick. He considered his collection as "applause" for his busy yet anonymous voice work. In 1977, however, he sold his collection of sword guards at Sotheby's, with the highest-selling, by Seiyoken Hagiya Katsuhira and depicting the Three Sake Tasters, fetching £4,200, an auction record.

His wife, Rosemary Miller, whom he had married in 1956, also had an interest in collecting paintings. On 27 August 1959, they had a son named Silas, who was named in case he grew up to become an actor, which he did, going to follow his parents' careers and provide voice overs on shows such as Summerton Mill. Despite his busy schedule, Hawkins spent lots of time with his son, reading bedtime stories as if he was recording, which Silas thought was overwhelming.

== Health problems ==
Hawkins regularly smoked 20 Olivier cigarettes in his prime, and, later, it would give him eczema. According to his son Silas, Hawkins' wife Rosemary would constantly dress his rashes. In 1992, Hawkins had an operation to remove a tumor in his brain, which left him unable to read and made him very drowsy.

== Death ==
Hawkins died on 8 July 2006, aged 82, of pneumonia. The funeral was held at St Matthews in Queensway, where Silas was baptised. A showing of "The Survivors", his first Doctor Who episode, was arranged, and Silas scattered his ashes at Fermain Bay, Guernsey, where HMS Limbourne sank.

== Filmography ==
=== Film ===
Year	Title	Role	Notes
1952	The Lost Hours	Mechanic	Uncredited
1956	Neuro-Muscular Block	Voices	
1964	No Short Cut	Narrator	voice only, uncredited
1965	Dr Who and the Daleks	Daleks	voice only, uncredited
1965	Look at Life: James Bond's Island	Narrator	Part of Look at Life, voice only
1966	Daleks' Invasion Earth 2150 A.D.	Daleks	voice only, uncredited
1973	Assassin	Passport Officer	
1974	Feelings	Unknown	
1975	Great	Voices	
1975	Super Natural Gas	Voices	
1978	Strega Nonna	Narrator	voice only
1978	Kingdom of Gifts	Voices	voice only, uncredited
1979	The Lion, the Witch and the Wardrobe	Dwarf Fox	voice only
1980	Rail Report 13: On Track for the Eighties	Narrator	British Transport Films, voice only, uncredited for latter two
1980	Centenary Express	Narrator	British Transport Films, voice only, uncredited for latter two
1981	The Train Makers	Narrator	British Transport Films, voice only, uncredited for latter two
1981	Moon Man	Narrator	voice only
1982	The Hat	Narrator	voice only
1984	And the Walls Came Tumbling Down	Narrator	documentary film, voice only
1988	Stowaways on the Ark	Willi Worm	English version, voice only
1989	Asterix and the Big Fight	Getafix	English version, voice only
1990	Peter in Magicland	Sandman	English version, voice only

=== Television ===
Year	Title	Role	Notes
1949	The Good Companions	Albert Tuggeridge	TV movie
1949	Old English	Reporter	TV movie
1950-1956	Whirligig	Mr Turnip Alexander Scrope Petrio Albert Willoughby	91 episodes (also encompasses 17 of Write It Yourself, 13 of Stranger from Space, 6 of Jeremy Make-Believe, 12 of Can We Help You? and 12 of Willoughby)
1951-1953	Saturday Special	Porterhouse Cyril	35 episodes (also encompasses 15 of The Skipper's Yarn)
1951	Aladdin	Lord High Chamberlain	TV movie
1952	Three Little Mushrooms	Voices	5 episodes
1952-1953	Flower Pot Men	Bill Ben	26 episodes
1953	Stuff and Nonsense	Voices	TV movie
1953	Peter and the Wolf	Narrator	TV movie
1954-1957	Billy Bean and His Funny Machine	Billy Bean	30 episodes
1954	Papa Laurent's Orchard	Narrator	Polish film dubbed for TV
1954	Harlequinade	Voices	TV movie
1955	The Travelling Musicians	Voices	TV movie
1955	Will O' the Gris	Voices	TV movie, uncredited
1955-1956	A Rubovian Legend	Lord Chamberlain Albert Weatherspoon	Series 1: (4 episodes)
1955-1956	The Woodentops	Spotty Dog	26 episodes
1956	The Bird of Truth	Voices	TV movie
1956	Alice's Adventures in Wonderland	Cheshire Cat	TV Movie
1956	Meet the Penguins	Voices	5 episodes
1956	The Holy Mice	Voices	TV Movie
1956-1958	Toytown	Ernest the Policeman	18 episodes (Note: Six episodes were remade with Hawkins reprising his role.)
1957	Boyd Q.C.	Unknown	Episode "The Case of Casanova Jones"
1957-1958	Fun in the Sun	Unknown	3 episodes
1957	The Emperor's Nightingale	Voices	TV movie
1957	Early to Braden	Unknown	12 episodes
1957	Beauty and the Beast	Voices	TV movie
1957	The Machine Breakers	Tom Thorpe	3 episodes
1957	The Stolen Miniatures	Henry	TV movie
1957	Studio E	Willoughby	7 episodes
1957-1966, 1974-1975	Captain Pugwash	All characters	99 episodes
1957	Treasure Island	Narrator	7 episodes
1957-1958	Please Note	Unknown	9 episodes
1958	Jim's Inn	Mr Miller	13 episodes
1958	You Are There	Unknown	Episode "The Decision at Derby"
1958	The Thompson Family	Ron Hicks	3 episodes
1958-1959	Motoring Club	Unknown	11 episodes
1958-1960	Life with the Lyons	Unknown	Episodes "Who's Your Lady Friend?" and "Cattle Auction"
1959-1960	Shopping for You	Unknown	8 episodes
1959	Murder Bag	Unknown	Episode "Lockhart Visits a Hospital"
1959	Crime Sheet	Unknown	Episode "Lockhart Has It in Store"
1959	Call Me Sam	Unknown	Episode 2
1959-1961	Adolphus	Narrator	12 episodes
1959-1967	Small Time	Bruin and other voices	In shows Brock and Bruin (54 episodes), The Lost Invitation, Cookery Tales of Oaktree Kitchen (6 episodes), Plans for a Party (2 episodes), The Adventures of Booty Mole (24 episodes), Rabbit Row (11 episodes) and Hattytown (12 episodes)
1960	Shop in the Corner	Unknown	10 episodes
1960	Friday Magazine	Presenter	7 episodes
1960-1962	Send for Saunders	Derek	44 episodes
1960	The Days of Vengeance	P.C. Harris and Narrator	6 episodes
1960-1962	Playbox	Ben Cooke Jack Royde	2 episodes
1961-1962	Little Jimmy	Narrator	12 episodes
1961-1963	ITV Play of the Week	Bill; Sparks	Episodes "The Two on the Beach" and "The Seventh Wave"
1962	Tintin and the Broken Ear	Narrator	7 episodes
1962	The Tommy Steele Show: Quincy’s Quest	Topper	TV movie
1963	Palle Alone in the World	Narrator	Danish film dubbed for TV as The Empty City
1963-1966	Blue Peter	Narrator (In Search of a Unicorn and Little Watha segments) Dalek Voices	7 episodes
1963-1968	Doctor Who	Dalek voices Cyberman voices	51 episodes
1964-1966	Songs for the Times	Narrator	5 episodes
1964	A World of His Own	Dalek voices	Episode 4 "A Pair of Plain Brown Shoes"
1964	Lower Than the Sea	Narrator	Dutch film dubbed for TV
1964	Boatswain on the Ice	Narrator	German film dubbed for TV
1964	Fred Hoyle’s Universe	Narrator	Documentary
1964-1969	Bleep and Booster	Narrator	44 episodes
1965	The Roy Castle Show	Dalek	1 episode
1965	The Newcomers	Radio announcer	2 episodes
1965-1966	The Big Spender	Spiro	5 episodes
1966	English For Everyone	Voices	24 episodes
1966	The Wednesday Play	Mr Willis	Episode "A Walk in the Sea"
1966	Softly, Softly	Detective Sergeant Thorne	Episode 14 "Blind Man's Buff"
1966	The Prizewinners	Narrator (A Policeman's Lot)	TV movie
1966	Five for Venice	Narrator	TV Movie
1966	Eugene Onegin	Narrator	TV Movie
1966-1967	Disney Wonderland	Goofy	64 episodes
1966-1967	Captain Zeppos	Voices	English version, 15 episodes
1967	Merry-Go-Round	Narrator	Episode "The Flying Breeze"
1968	The White Horses	Voices	English version, 13 episodes
1969	Hark at Barker	Shoong Pu Teng	Series 1, episode 7: "Rustless and the Solar System"
1969	The Power Game	Interpreter	Episode "Standard Practice"
1969	The Flashing Blade	Mazarin and other voices	English version, 10 episodes
1969	Out of the Unknown	Dalek	Episode "Get Off My Cloud"
1969	Paulus the Woodgnome	Paulus	English version, 39 episodes
1970	Doomwatch	Computer	Episode 5: "Project Sahara"
1970-1971	The Tomfoolery Show	Voices	17 episodes
1971	A Family at War	Dimmock	Episode "We Could Be a Lot Worse Off"
1971	Theatre Macabre	Various	English version, 4 episodes
1972-1974	Larry the Lamb	Voices	26 episodes
1972	The Adventures of Sir Prancelot	All characters	31 episodes
1972	The Dick Emery Show	Unknown	1 episode
1972-1978	Dave Allen at Large	Various	19 episodes; writer of additional material for 4
1972	The Shadow of the Tower	Voice	Episode 5: "The Serpent and the Comforter"
1972-1973	Rainbow	Zippy	Series 1: (50 episodes)
1973	Son of the Bride	Mr Cuthbertson	Episode 3 "Of Unsound Mind"
1973	The Count of Monte Cristo	Voices	17 episodes
1973	Tymancha’s Friend	Voices	English version of Russian film
1973	Black and Blue	Voices	Episode 4, "Rust"
1973-1975	The Daily Fable	Mr Owl	English version, 130 episodes
1974	Dial M for Murder	Sergeant Maclean	Episode 7 "Dead Connection"
1974	Father Brown	Gibbs	Episode 1: "The Hammer of God"
1975	Sadie, It's Cold Outside	Radio announcer	Episode 4
1976	Bless This House	Radio announcer (uncredited)	Episode "Beautiful Dreamer"
1976	Agaton Sax	Narrator	English version, 4 episodes
1976	The Water Margin	Voices	Episode 7 "How Easy to Die, How Hard to Live"
1976-1977	Noah and Nelly in.. SkylArk	Voices	30 episodes
1977	Rudy Schokker Cries No More	Voices	Dutch film dubbed for TV
1977	Right or Wrong: My Country	Voices	German film dubbed for TV
1977	Ubu Roi	Voices	English version, uncredited
1977	The Master Thief	Voices	German film dubbed for TV
1977	The Eieheiji Temple	Voices	Japanese film dubbed for TV
1977	Tulip Fiesta	Narrator	Film originally made for festival
1978	The Postman	Narrator	Czechoslovak film dubbed for TV
1978	The Glorious Musketeers	Rochefort; Owl	
1978	Matt the Gooseboy	Rifle Loader; Old Rider	Hungarian film dubbed for TV
1979	The Perishers	BH	7 episodes
1979	Quincy's Quest	Voices	TV movie
1980-1986	The Adventure Game	Opening narration	11 episodes, uncredited
1980	The Curse of King Tut's Tomb	Voice of Princess Vilma (Wendy Hiller) when possessed by Osiris and Ra	TV movie
1980	One Man's Lauder	Voice	TV movie
1983-1986	SuperTed	Narrator	36 episodes
1984	C.Q.	Voices	TV movie
1984-1985	The Family-Ness	Voices	25 episodes
1985	Seaview	Mynah bird	Episode "The Godfather" credited in Radio Times only
1986-1987	Jimbo and the Jet-Set	Voices	25 episodes
1986	Santaworld: Dusty's Tale	Narrator	TV movie
1989	Chris and Crumble	Narrator	7 episodes
1989	Windfalls	All characters	26 episodes (Note: Episodes originally aired as two back-to-back.)
1989	The Storyteller	Devil	Episode 1: "The Soldier and Death"
1989	Theatre Night	Michael Lomax	Episode "Knuckle", uncredited
1989	Patterns of Play	Narrator	TV movie
1989	The Magic Mirror	Voices	Episode "The Frog King"
1989-1990	Penny Crayon	Dennis	12 episodes
1991	The Storyteller: Greek Myths	Vulture	Episode 4 "Daedalus and Icarus"
1992	Little Brrm	All Characters and Narration	13 episodes

=== Radio ===
Year	Title	Role	Notes
1949	Sheppey	Unknown	Play
1949	Leopold the Beloved	Martial	Play
1949	An English Summer	Willie Wishart	Play
1949	The Taverna Brothers	Hermann	Play
1950	Eden End	Wilfred Kirby	Play
1950	The Ivory Door	Titus	Play
1953	Just Fancy	Unknown	24 episodes
1954	The Mystery of Robert the Devil	Various	Play
1955	No Peace for the Wicked	Various	3 episodes
1955	Mrs Dale's Diary	Tiffin	Play
1955	The Good Soldier	Jimmy	Play
1955	A Tinker's Tale	Raven	Play
1955	Ray's a Laugh	Daisy the Turkey	Episode 11 "Let's Talk Turkey"
1955-1958	Educating Archie	Various	6 episodes
1956	Floggits	Unknown	Play
1957	Mrs Dale's Diary	Monument	Unrelated to 1955 production
1957	Life with the Lyons	Unknown	Christmas Edition
1958	Round the Bend	Unknown	20 episodes
1960	We're in Business	Parrot	Episode "The Parrot"
1960	Something to Shout About	Joey the Parrot	Play
1960-1961	Spy-Catcher	Various	2 episodes
1960	Meet the Huggetts	Unknown	2 episodes
1960	Law and Disorder	Various	2 episodes
1961-1964	Listen on Saturday	Narrator	81 episodes
1961	Inspector Scott Investigates	Mr Faraday	1 episode
1961	Shadow on the Sun	Unknown	3 episodes
1963	Clancy of the Outback	Wright	Episode 2 "The Youno Prospector"
1964-1967	Emery at Large	Unknown	4 episodes
1964	A State of Chaos	Unknown	Play
1965	Moonstrike	Various	3 episodes
1965	Marriage Lines	Various	3 episodes
1965	This Is Your Jim	Unknown	Special
1966	The Morecambe and Wise Show	Unknown	4 episodes
1966	Scandal!	Various	4 episodes
1966-1967	Steptoe and Son	Unknown	2 episodes
1967	A Life of Bliss	Unknown	Episode "The Homecoming"
1967	Six Steps in the Dark	Unknown	Episode 1
1967	The Young Pioneers	Voices	Episode 1 "The Sempill Inheritance"
1967	The Likely Lads	Scoutmaster	1 episode
1967	The Bird's Nest	Unknown	Play
1968	Strange	Major Marcos	Play
1969	A Scent of New Mown Hay	Mavranin	Episode 1
1969	The Dark Island	Major Williams	5 episodes
1970	Mister Pybus	Stan Cullen	Episode 26 "Brigshaw and Son"
1970	A Batchelor Confirmed	Narrator	Special
1971	The Music of Exile	Narrator	Special
1974	And the Wall Came Tumbling Down	Leonard Gile	Episode 6 "The Last Map"
1975	Home to Roost	Various	2 episodes
1975	Galbraith	Lander	2 episodes
1978	Chanson francaise	Narrator	6 episodes
1978	Strains of Moravia	Narrator	Play
1978	The Hitchhiker's Guide to the Galaxy	Frankie Mouse	Fit the Fourth
1979	The Biggest Cream Bun in the World	Voices	Part of Listen with Mother
1980	Uncle Ben's Big Dinner	Voices	Part of Listen with Mother
1980	The Milkman Wouldn't Get Up	Voices	Part of Listen with Mother
1990	Spinsters on the March	Narrator	Play
