= Susan Wynter =

British toy maker and photographer (1923–2013)

Susan Wynter (née Lethbridge; 1923 – 2013) was a British toy maker and photographer. She founded the Toy Trumpet Workshop, creating wooden toys sold through major British department stores and retailers. Her toys later entered museum collections as examples of British craft and innovative design blending play and learning.

== Early life ==
Wynter was the daughter of the writer Mabel Lethbridge. She grew up in London and developed an early interest in woodworking, learning to carve wood at a billiard-table workshop. She worked as a flight mechanic during World War II and attended engineering college.

== Career ==
Wynter moved with her mother to St Ives, Cornwall, after World War II. She established the Toy Trumpet Workshop in 1946, working from a coffin-maker’s workshop on The Digey.

The company produced handmade wooden toys and models, blending function and education in an innovative way. She exhibited at the London Design Centre and the Venice Biennale. Her toys were sold through department stores such as Harrods and Fortnum & Mason.

She moved her business to Brightlingsea, Essex in 1971. Wynter sold Toy Trumpet to Galt Toys in 1984.

Wynter later became an Associate of the Royal Photographic Society.

== Personal life ==
Wynter married painter Bryan Wynter in 1949. They separated due to his affair with a student. She later married Andrew Murray.
