= Mary Ryan (academic) =

First woman in Ireland or Great Britain to be a professor at a university

- Born: 14 December 1873; Cork, Ireland
- Died: 16 June 1961 (aged 87); Douglas, County Cork
- Occupation: Professor of Romance Languages at University College Cork
- Parent(s): Edward Ryan; Matilda Ryan(nee O'Connor)
- Relatives: Bishop Finbar Ryan OP (brother); Sir Andrew Ryan (brother); Sir Thomas Ryan (brother)

Mary Ryan (14 December 1873 – 16 June 1961) was the first woman in Ireland or Great Britain to be a professor at a university. She was the Professor of Romance Languages at University College Cork in 1910.

== Early life and education ==
Ryan was born on 14 December 1873 at 4 Thomas Street West, Cork city, to Edward Ryan and Matilda (née O'Connor) of Blackrock Road. Edward Ryan owned the soap manufacturing company which later made candles. The company became Kinsale Candles and now belongs to Punch Industries, a subsidiary of Henkel.

Ryan attended, and was the first student, at St Angela's College in Cork; initially founded as a secondary school for girls by the Ursuline Sisters. The school extended its reach to become what was then known as a 'University top' where girls could get a University education before sitting the exams through the Royal University of Ireland. Women were not allowed to attend lectures in the University but they could sit the exams and get a degree. Ryan gained her Bachelor of Arts degree in 1895 from the Royal University.

== Career ==
Appointed in 1909 as a lecturer in German, Ryan became the first woman professor when she was appointed in 1910 in University College Cork. Ryan was able to join the faculty because of the legislative change in 1908 which had created the National University of Ireland, a University system which did allow for the admittance of women. While this created greater opportunity for Ryan and others, it spelled the end of the women's colleges like St Angela's since they were no longer needed to give women a University education.

She was known for sending students to complete postgraduate education in the Sorbonne and she was awarded a Doctor of Letters for her publications. She was also awarded the Legion of Honour by the French Government.

In a letter to Aloys Fleischmann, Seán Ó Faoláin had this to say about Professor Ryan:

"Mary Ryan- a monster as a professor: a sweet old lady no doubt. Do you know what she used to do? She used to TEACH us! Sacred Heart-teaching in a University!!!! You know grammar and syntax and this and that and... Oh! And Ah! and groans. And everybody said she was marvellous because she did teach the little ducks, spoonfed them, breastfed them, predigested their pap for them,"

Ryan retired in 1938 and died on 16 June 1961 at Gortalough, Douglas, County Cork.

Prof Ryan was deeply religious, and her faith and academic nature is displayed in her contributions to publications such as the Dublin Review, Irish Educational Review, Blackfriars Monthly, and Irish Rosary.

== Legacy ==
In 2010 former President of Ireland Mary Robinson was part of the celebrations in University College Cork, held to commemorate the achievement of a woman being appointed as Professor for the first time.

The UCC School of Languages, Literature and Cultures has named a scholarship in her honor, the Mary Ryan Language Scholarship, awarded annually.

== See also ==
- In Profile: Professor Mary Ryan | University Express
- Women in University
- The Admission of Women to the National University of Ireland Judith Harford 44 Education Research and Perspectives, Vol. 35, No.2, 2008
- The College: A History of Queen's/University College Cork, 1845–1995, John A. Murphy, Cork University Press, 1995
- Bibliography
- President Robinson on Mary Ryan
