= Bryan Wynter =

English painter (1915–1975)

Brayane Herbert Wynter (8 September 1915 – 2 February 1975) was one of the St. Ives group of British painters. His work was mainly abstract, drawing upon nature for inspiration.

Born in London, he was educated at Haileybury. In 1933 he began work as a trainee in his family's laundry business. In 1937–38 he studied at Westminster School of Art, and 1938–40 at the Slade School of Fine Art in London and Oxford. In the Second World War he was a conscientious objector, first working on land drainage in Oxfordshire, then looking after monkeys being studied by the zoologist Solly Zuckerman.

He settled in Zennor, Cornwall, in 1945, and in 1946 was co-founder of the Crypt Group. He married Susan Lethbridge, daughter of the writer Mabel Lethbridge whom he met in Cornwall. He taught at Bath Academy of Art, Corsham, from 1951 to 1956. He was a member of the London Group of artists, and of the Penwith Society of Arts. He died at Penzance, Cornwall. His auction record is £131,000 for his painting In the Streams Path (1958), set at Sotheby's on 11 November 2016. The work had been acquired by the pop star David Bowie in 1995 at the sale of the collection of Sir John Moores.

In 2001 he was the subject of Bryan Wynter: A Selected Retrospective at Tate St Ives.

Some of his most remarkable works are constructions which he titled IMOOS (Images Moving Out Onto Space). Using a parabolic mirror, he would hang contrasting pairs of painted shapes, which rotated freely. Their reversed reflections enlarged, appearing to move in opposite directions.

== Collections ==
Nine of his works are in the Tate collection, and 14 in the collection of the British Council.

His works are also in the collections of the Arts Council, the National Galleries of Scotland, the National Museum & Gallery of Wales, Kelvingrove Art Gallery & Museum, Glasgow, Southampton City Art Gallery, York City Art Gallery, the Ferens Art Gallery, Hull, the Government Art Collection, the Towner Gallery, Eastbourne, Bristol City Museum and Art Gallery, the Usher Gallery, Rugby Art Gallery and Museum, Birmingham Museum & Art Gallery, Abbot Hall Art Gallery, Kendal, the Whitworth Art Gallery and Leeds City Art Gallery.
