= Archbishop Ryan =

Archbishop Ryan may refer to:

- Dermot Ryan (1924–1985), archbishop of Dublin, Ireland
- James Hugh Ryan (1886–1947), archbishop of Omaha, Nebraska
- Joseph T. Ryan (1913–2000), archbishop of Anchorage, Alaska and archbishop for the military services, USA
- Patrick Finbar Ryan (1881–1975), archbishop of Port of Spain, Trinidad
- Patrick John Ryan (1831–1911), archbishop of Philadelphia, Pennsylvania
