= Andrew Ryan (diplomat) =

British diplomat (1876–1949)

Sir Andrew Ryan KBE CMG
- Born: 5 November 1876
- Died: 31 December 1949 (aged 73)
- Education: Queens College Cork (RUI); Emmanuel College, Cambridge
- Occupation: Diplomat
- Children: Columba Ryan; John Ryan
- Parent(s): Edward Ryan; Matilda Ryan
- Relatives: Bishop Finbar Ryan (brother); Prof. Mary Ryan (sister); Sir Thomas Ryan (brother)

Sir Andrew Ryan KBE CMG (5 November 1876 – 31 December 1949) was a British diplomat. He was Consul-General to Morocco from 1924 to 1930, Minister to Saudi Arabia from 1930 to 1936, and Consul-General to Albania from 1936 to 1939.

Ryan was born on 5 November 1876 in Rochestown, County Cork, Ireland, the son of Edward Ryan, a soap and candle manufacturer of Douglas, Cork, and his wife Matilda O'Connor. He was educated at the Christian Brothers College, Cork, and at Queen's College, Cork, where he graduated BA in Greek and Latin from the Royal University of Ireland, and then proceeded to Emmanuel College, Cambridge, where from 1897 to 1899 he trained as an interpreter on a course run for the consular department of the British Foreign Office, studying Arabic, Turkish, and law.

In 1913 Ryan married Ruth Margaret van Millingen of Dunblane, Perthshire. They had four sons, including the Roman Catholic theologian and philosopher Columba Ryan and the cartoonist John Ryan.

His sister Mary Ryan was the first woman to become a professor in Great Britain or Ireland. His brother Sir Thomas Ryan (1879–1934) worked in the Indian Civil Service, and a younger brother was the Dominican priest Patrick Finbar Ryan OP, Archbishop of Port of Spain, Trinidad.

Ryan's autobiography, The Last of the Dragomans, was published by Geoffrey Bles in 1951.
