= Billy Bean and His Funny Machine =

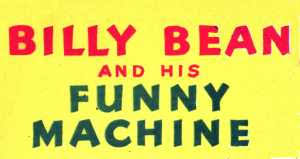
- The title card for the show
- Also known as: The New Adventures of Billy Bean and his Funny Machine, The Further Adventures of Billy Bean and his Funny Machine, The Adventures of Billy Bean and his Funny Machine
- Genre: Children's Television
- Based on: Jolly Gene and His Fun Machine
- Country of origin: United Kingdom
- No. of seasons: 6
- No. of episodes: 36

Production
- Production company: BBC

Original release
- Network: BBC
- Release: 1953 – 1957

Billy Bean and His Funny Machine is a UK children's TV series which was first broadcast by the BBC in 1953. It concluded in 1957 after 36 episodes.

== Premise ==
The show featured a puppet called Billy Bean, who operated a large machine which possessed devices such as a Dorset-Faucet (named after the inventor, Mr. Faucet of Dorset) and a Mixerator. Billy could produce anything he drew on the "cartoonerator", although misunderstanding led to many mistakes made with humorous results.

Billy was accompanied by Yoo-Hoo the Cuckoo, who always laid an egg at least once every episode, which would be rolled down the machine via zig-zag chutes, and Lester, the unseen engine room operator.

== Production ==
Based upon Chuck Luchsinger's American children's show Jolly Gene & His Fun Machine, like Jolly Gene, Billy Bean also ran a train and was dressed as an American locomotive engineer (train driver). John Wright made the puppets and equipment, the series was written by Lisa Lincoln, with Reginald Jeffryes drawing what was seen on the cartoonerator, and the puppeteers were Jane Tyson and Elizabeth Donaldson. The show was produced by Vere Lorrimer.

The first series of six episodes featured Dick Vosburgh as Billy Bean and Gaylord Cavallaro as Yoo-Hoo, broadcast twice per month. For series 2 onwards Peter Hawkins took over as Billy, with Ivan Owen as Yoo-Hoo. Series 4, 5 and 6 went under various names, including The New Adventures of Billy Bean and his Funny Machine, The Further Adventures of Billy Bean and his Funny Machine and The Adventures of Billy Bean and his Funny Machine respectively.

== Episodes ==
=== Series 1 (1953) ===
- Untitled – 9 July 1953
- Untitled – 20 July 1953
- Untitled – 3 August 1953
- Untitled – 17 August 1953
- Untitled – 31 August 1953
- Untitled – 14 September 1953

=== Series 2 (1954) ===
- Untitled – 30 June 1954
- Untitled – 12 July 1954
- Untitled – 28 July 1954
- Untitled – 11 August 1954
- Untitled – 23 August 1954
- Untitled – 8 September 1954

=== Series 3 (1955) ===
- Untitled – 4 April 1955
- Untitled – 18 April 1955
- Untitled – 2 May 1955
- Untitled – 19 May 1955
- Untitled – 1 June 1955
- Untitled – 6 July 1955
- Untitled – 20 July 1955
- Untitled – 3 August 1955
- Untitled – 17 August 1955
- Untitled – 31 August 1955

=== Series 4 (The New Adventures of Billy Bean and his Funny Machine, 1956) ===
- Not a Sausage – 9 January 1956
- The Atomic Train – 23 January 1956
- The Giant Beanoscope – 6 February 1956
- Yoo-Hoo Takes the Air – 20 February 1956
- Billy's Day Off – 5 March 1956
- The Secret of the Machine – 19 March 1956

=== Series 5 (The Further Adventures of Billy Bean and his Funny Machine, 1956) ===
- The Great Clean-Up – 6 September 1956
- The Jet Propelled Cuckoo – 27 September 1956
- Billy's Bonfire Night – 5 November 1956
- The Atomic Power House – 19 November 1955
- Nuts and Crackers – 3 December 1956
- Santa Billy – 17 December 1956

=== Series 6 (The Adventures of Billy Bean and his Funny Machine, 1957) ===
- Billy Bean: Speed King – 1 March 1957
- Yoo-Hoo's Zoo Quest – 15 March 1957
