= Kingdom of Gifts =

1978 British animated film

Kingdom of Gifts is a 1978 British animated film directed by Ted Kneeland, who co-wrote the screenplay with Jo Anna Kneeland. The score was composed by Mario Braggiotti.

== Production and release ==
According to the British Film Institute, the film "probably was not released".

A full-page advertisement seeking funding for the project appeared in the 12 May 1976 edition of Variety, and an "in production" announcement appeared in the same publication on 11 May 1977.

The US copyright office holds an entry for Kingdom of Gifts sound recordings registered in 1979 by Edward S. Kneeland and JoAnna Kneeland.

== Cast ==
- Gemma Craven as the unhappy princess
- Douglas Fairbanks Jr. as the proud king
- Peter Sellers as the slightly larcenous mayor
- Terry-Thomas as the bumbling chancellor
- Peter Hawkins as other voices
