= Columba Ryan =

English Dominican priest and philosopher (1916–2009)

The Reverend Dr. Columba Ryan OP
- Church: Dominican Order
- Appointed: 1935

Personal details
- Born: Patrick Ryan; 13 January 1916 Hampstead, England
- Died: 4 August 2009 (aged 93)
- Parents: Sir Andrew Ryan (father)
- Education: Oxford University (DPhil)

Columba Ryan OP (born Patrick Ryan, 13 January 1916 in Hampstead – 4 August 2009) was an English priest of the Dominican Order and a philosophy teacher, university chaplain, and pastor. He was the brother of animator and cartoonist John Ryan.

== Life ==
Patrick Ryan was born in Hampstead in 1916, the second son of Sir Andrew Ryan, a diplomat who was the last dragoman in Constantinople, and his wife Ruth. Patrick was educated at Ampleforth in North Yorkshire. In 1935 he entered the Dominican Order at Woodchester Priory in Gloucestershire where he was given the name Columba. His uncle was Patrick Finbar Ryan OP, Archbishop of Port of Spain, Trinidad.

At the age of 30 (in 1946) he completed his DPhil at Oxford University. He was one of the friars who was on the Peace Pilgrimage to Vézelay in Burgundy, selecting "30 strong men" to carry a heavy wooden cross across France in thanksgiving for the end of the Second World War.

Ryan had an analytical mind and enjoyed philosophical controversy and debate. While teaching philosophy at the Dominican House of Studies at Hawkesyard Priory in 1954, he set up a Philosophical Enquiry Group, an annual meeting for Catholic philosophers held at the nearby Spode House. The Catholic philosophers Elizabeth Anscombe and Peter Geach were among the first invited, remaining leading figures of the group for the 20 years. He was also bursar at the priory.

He was briefly in charge of studies at Blackfriars, Oxford, where he was pro-regent of studies, then became chaplain to the Catholic students at the University of Strathclyde.

Ryan's contribution to philosophy and theology was more through his influence on the people he taught, although a short piece 'The Traditional Concept of Natural Law: an Interpretation' (which he claimed to have written on the train before he gave it as a lecture) has been influential. His students included Herbert McCabe and Timothy McDermott, both translators of the Blackfriars Summa, and Fergus Kerr.

He was an early pioneer of religious broadcasting, producing and narrating films about the religious life.

He died, aged 93, on what was then the Feast of St Dominic.
