= The Adventures of Sir Prancelot =

1972 British children's TV series

- Created by: John Ryan
- Voices of: Peter Hawkins
- Country of origin: United Kingdom
- No. of episodes: 31

Production
- Running time: 5 minutes per episode

Original release
- Network: BBC1
- Release: January 13 – February 25, 1972

The Adventures of Sir Prancelot is a British children's animated television programme written and produced by John Ryan. It followed the adventures of Sir Prancelot, an eccentric inventor-knight who heads for the Crusades in the Holy Land. It was first transmitted on BBC 1 on Thursday, 13 January 1972.

== Plot ==
Sir Prancelot decides to join the Crusades to escape both his bank manager and his overbearing wife Lady Histeria. He is dismayed when he learns that Histeria intends to accompany him and eventually the entire household — including their children, Sim and Sue; the miserly majordomo Girth, a cockney minstrel (who is also the show's narrator) and several serfs — set sail for adventure.

The Crusading group repeatedly fall foul of the dastardly Count Otto "The Blot", but always escape by some contrivance of Sir Prancelot himself. After many unlikely adventures, they arrive in the Holy Land only to discover that the Crusades are over — they are 50 years too late! After a final showdown with Count Otto, they return to England in a rocket ship also invented by Sir Prancelot.

== Production ==
The Sir Prancelot animation came from the same stable as Captain Pugwash and was in a similar style. All the characters were voiced by Peter Hawkins, who was billed on the credits of both shows as 'All the Voices'. The music was composed by Alan Parker. Episode 5 was never made due to being John Ryan’s unlucky number. The first nineteen episodes were released on VHS in the United Kingdom, while episodes 20-30 were released in the United States by Family Home Entertainment. The series was also adapted into vinyl form.

== Characters ==
- Sir Prancelot, an inventor-knight and would-be Crusader
- Lady Histeria, Prancelot's wife
- Sim and Sue, their children (both of whom never speak throughout the series' run)
- Master Girth, the castle majordomo who administers the accounts
- The Minstrel, the unnamed cockney lute-player who is also the show's narrator
- Bert and Harry, the serfs (there were several other serfs who were never named)
- Pig William, Lady Histeria's pet pig (who she frequently refers to as "Pigwig")
- Count Otto, the show's main antagonist, sworn enemy of Sir Prancelot
- Duke Uglio, a greedy and bad-tempered Italian aristocrat

== Episodes ==
- Crumblecreek Crusade
- The Lady Hysteria
- A Few Items of Baggage
- A Weighty Problem
- On the Rocks
- Count Otto
- Thunderstruck
- Landfall
- Kidnapped
- Hostile Enemy Intentions
- The Haunted Watch-tower
- The Flight
- Flying Crusade
- Duke Uglio
- An Ugly Affair
- Behind the Times
- Not Cricket
- Balloon Blitz
- Ships of the Desert
- A Nice Cup of Tea
- Common Market
- Flying Carpet
- Open Sesame
- High Treason
- Homeward Bound
- Hurry to the Rescue
- Gold for Otto
- Mystery in the Tower
- Blast Off
- Splash Down
- Command Performance

== Merchandise ==
The show was initially successful, spawning annuals from 1973 to 1976, tie-in books written by Jane Morey, jigsaws and books bundled with pop-outs not unlike those used in the series itself. Action Art rubbings were also produced.

Corgi Toys produced a prototype for a Sir Prancelot toy, but after a second series was never commissioned, the idea was dropped.
