= St Angela's College, Cork =

Location
- Cork city, County Cork; Ireland
- Coordinates: 51.9030°N 8.4706°W

Information
- Type: Secondary school
- Mottoes: Those who instruct many unto justice will shine like stars for all eternity
- Religious affiliation: Catholic
- Established: 1887
- Principal: Patrick Curran
- Enrollment: 600
- Affiliation: Ursuline Sisters
- Website: www.stangelascollege.ie

St Angela's College, Cork is a non-fee paying girls secondary school catering for students between the ages of 12-19 around Cork city and the surrounding areas. The school has a Catholic ethos under the trusteeship of the Ursuline Sisters.

== Academic ==
The school operates the usual courses for the Junior Certificate, Transition Year and Leaving Certificate with the subjects:

Religion, Gaeilge, English, Maths, History, Geography, French, Science, Physical Education, Music, Accounting, German, Business Studies, Art, Home Economics – Social & Scientific, Music, Design and Communication Graphics, Physics, Chemistry, Biology.

== History ==
St. Angela's College was founded in 1887 to educate the girls in Cork city. The school was a foundation from the earlier Ursuline Convent in Blackrock, Cork at the request of Bishop O’Callaghan. It was initially based in a former police station on St. Patrick's Hill. The first student was Mary Ryan, later the first woman university professor in Ireland or Great Britain. The high uptake of places in the school meant that building began immediately and the new school building was opened the following year.

St. Joseph's, a single-storey building on the grounds was added to as it was intended to serve the third-level section of the school. Since there was difficulty in girls attending university, although they could get a degree from the Royal University of Ireland, a degree course location was needed outside of Dublin or Belfast. Other courses which were provided for the older students post secondary school were around Teacher Training, Secretarial Skills and Home Economics. It was one of only five colleges for women in Ireland in 1895. Once the National University of Ireland was implemented in 1908 and the Queen's university became University College Cork, the third level aspect of the school was no longer required. However the secondary school retains this in the full name of the school, St. Angela’s College and High School.

== Extra-curricular activities ==
St. Angela's College provides a number of extra-curricular activities including hockey, tennis, basketball and Gaelic football.

== Recent developments ==
O'Donnell & Tuomey Architects were commissioned in early 1999 to develop a new building for the school. The process lasted 16 years but came to completion in 2016, earning numerous awards:

- Civic Trust Award - Commendation
- AAI Award
- Irish Concrete Society - Building Award
- Irish Concrete Society - Overall Winner
- Cork Better Building Awards - Judges Choice Award
- RIBA Award for International Excellence
- RIAI Award - Best Education Building

The redevelopment cost €9.2m and includes features such as a rooftop ball-court, sunny terraces and a full-sized sports hall, complete with a climbing wall.

== Alumni of note ==
- Tilly Fleischmann (1882–1967), Irish pianist, organist, pedagogue and writer
- Mary MacSwiney (1872–1942), maths teacher at the school arrested as part of the Easter Rising events in 1916
- Mary Ryan (1873–1961), language professor at University College Cork, first female professor in Ireland or the UK
- Mabel Lethbridge (1900–1968), English writer and Great War munitions worker, the youngest person to have been awarded a British Empire Medal
- Bridget Flannery (born 1959), Irish painter working in abstract painting
- Linda Doyle (born 1968), electrical and electronic engineer, since 2021 the 45th Provost of Trinity College Dublin
- Noelle McCarthy (born 1978/79), writer and radio broadcaster
