= Look at Life (film series) =

- Cover of a DVD compilation
- Narrated by: Tim Turner and others
- Production company: Rank Organisation
- Running time: typically around 8 minutes
- Country: United Kingdom
- Language: English

Look at Life was a regular British series of short documentary films of which over 500 were produced between 1959 and 1969 by the Special Features Division of the Rank Organisation for screening in their Odeon and Gaumont cinemas. The films always preceded the main feature film that was being shown in the cinema that week. It replaced the circuit's newsreel, Universal News, which had become increasingly irrelevant in the face of more immediate news media, particularly on television with the launch of ITN on the Independent Television service, which began broadcasting in parts of the United Kingdom in 1955.

== Presentation ==
Produced on 35mm film and in Eastmancolor, these eight-minute 'featurettes' melded a light-hearted magazine format with a more in depth documentary approach and depicted aspects of life, mainly in Britain, but sometimes further afield. The films often depicted elements of the 'push button' or 'jet age', demonstrating advances in technology and a reflection on the changing tastes, fashions and trends representative of the so-called 'swinging sixties' era, which were often portrayed in a glossy, vibrant and optimistic way. The films also reported on topical issues that were affecting modern day society such as road safety, civil defence and pollution, and often sought to explain the rapid changes that were taking place in the country in an entertaining and informative narrative. Look at Life also took its cameras abroad to focus on events and affairs within the Commonwealth and British colonies including Aden, Gibraltar and the ever diminishing British controlled areas of Africa. Look at Life cameras were also offered exclusive access behind the Iron Curtain to present life in the Eastern Bloc, particularly in East Berlin and the Soviet Union.

The films were generally narrated in the style typical of newsreel films with a principal voice-over while letting the images tell the story. The narration was generally spoken over the natural sounds of the subject being discussed such as motor traffic or the activities within a workplace and with musical accompaniment. People who were featured in the programmes were seldom heard to speak unless as background sound, their activities and interactions with others generally being commented upon by the narrator. Otherwise the subject of the film or clip would sometimes address the camera directly or perform in a given situation, both in a staged and a scripted manner whereby the narrator could often add a humorous or ironic comment in the context of the subject.

On occasions an expert or professional in the field of the subject such as inventor of the Hovercraft Christopher Cockerell could be watched presenting the film directly to camera and providing the voiceovers. In the most part narration of the films was provided by well known celebrities and presenters of the time including Raymond Baxter, Eamonn Andrews, Wynford Vaughan-Thomas, Michael Ingrams, Anthony Bilbow, Sid James and Martin Jarvis in later editions. James Bond’s Island was narrated by voice actor Peter Hawkins. However the majority of the films were narrated by actor Tim Turner.

In the early years at the end of each film the caption "Take a Look at Life Again Soon" would appear on screen. Most episodes were between 8 and 10 minutes long, but some such as Common Market and High, Wide and Faster were longer at 17 minutes.

== Public Releases ==
Over 500 episodes were produced altogether. Digitally restored from the original film elements, the Look at Life series is now licensed by ITV Studios Global Entertainment, previously known on screen as Granada Ventures and distributed by the Network imprint. Many of the films have not been seen in full since their original screenings in the cinemas, although a number of films have been previously released on Super 8 and on DVD in themed categories. These include Look at Life – Swingin' London, which explores elements of contemporary London life, work and traditions and Look at Life – On the Railways, which represented the great changes that were taking place to Britain's railways in the wake of the modernisation programme and the decline of steam. However Network has gradually released box-sets of the films over eight volumes, containing a total of 499 films.

Volume 1: "Transport" is a four disc compilation released in 2010 and contains 54 films on the theme of transport. Look at Life Volume 2: "Military" containing 45 films on three discs was released in June 2011, whilst Volume 3: "Science" containing 45 films on three discs was released in September 2011.

Two further volumes, Volume 4: "Sport" containing 42 films on three discs and Volume 5: "Cultural Heritage" containing 64 films on four discs were for release in August and November 2012 respectively. Volume 6: "World Affairs" containing 72 films on five discs was released on 1 February 2013. On 10 August 2015, a seventh volume Volume 7: "Business and Industry" containing 60 films on three discs was released.

The final 7 disc Volume 8: People and Places presenting a remaining 117 films on seven discs was released in the spring of 2021.

In November 2012, the series Britain on Film commissioned by BBC Scotland for broadcast on BBC Four began a twenty-part series providing an insight into life in Britain in the 1960s exclusively featuring footage from the Look at Life series. Distributed by ITN Source, a partly owned subsidiary of ITV Plc, each episode features a different aspect of British life and culture during the decade, including the changing role of women and how leisure time was spent including the rising popularity of overseas travel. It is presented with original commentary from the series with captions to provide the contemporary viewer with explanation.

In the 2020s, many of the original films have been shown regularly on the UK channel Talking Pictures TV, both live on broadcast platforms and on demand via the red button and the channel's Encore website.

== Available on DVD ==
=== Volume 1: Transport ===
==== Disc 1 (1959–1960) ====
Date of Feature	Title	Narrator	Synopsis
April 1959	Ticket to Tokyo	E.V.H. Emmett	Travelling with a British Commonwealth Britannia airliner from London via Bombay to Tokyo to discover Japan and back via Hong Kong
May 1959	Letting off Steam	Tim Turner	The phasing-out of coal-powered steam locomotives and their replacement with oil-powered and electrified trains.
May 1959	New Roads for Old	Tim Turner	A look at new roads such as the London to Yorkshire motorway, Preston By-pass, Runcorn Bridge and works around London, including the gyratory system at Marble Arch, the underpass at Hyde Park Corner, road widening at Elephant and Castle, and the new Chiswick Flyover.
August 1959	Flight on a Cushion	Tim Turner	Peter Lamb, the Chief Test Pilot of East Cowes-based Saunders Roe, talks about hovercraft with the inventor Christopher Cockerell and the recording of the first cross Channel crossing on 25 July 1959.
August 1959	Talking of Coaches	Tim Turner	Life from the back of a coach with a tour of Blackpool and Italy with young Eric.
October 1959	Alpine Rescue	Tim Turner	A Swiss Flying Club uses adapted aircraft to deliver supplies to Alpine ski lodges - and to effect the rescue of injured mountaineers
October 1959	Shopping for a 'Queen'	Tim Turner	Replenishing the Queen Elizabeth, the 83,000-ton liner, before her next voyage.
November 1959	Sailing the Sky	Tim Turner	A look at the world of silent flight, including a brief introduction to record breaking British female glider pilot and instructor Ann Welch
December 1959	Driving Test	Tim Turner	Driving school tuition, including the innovative mock-up car with moving lights, cars for disabled people, the junior driver course at Grammar schools, and the training of police drivers and London Bus drivers.
January 1960	Shape of a Ship	Tim Turner	Building ocean liners such as the Canberra and how their shape is changing, plus a review of the slump affecting cargo shipping and the exciting future of air freight.
February 1960	Air Hostess	Tim Turner	Following the perceived glamorous life of 24-year-old airline hostess Pat Rossiter on her working day on an 11-hour flight from London to Rome and Benghazi
March 1960	Taxi! Taxi!!	Tim Turner	Looking at the organisation behind London's taxis, their maintenance, regulation of meters, training for "The Knowledge", to picking up passengers and driver welfare.
April 1960	All Through the Night	Tim Turner	A look into trunk roads with the night lorries, following the night drivers, to see where they eat and who they meet

==== Disc 2 (1960–1963) ====
Date of Feature	Title	Narrator	Synopsis
April 1960	Over and Under	Tim Turner	Painting the Forth Bridge and a look at modern bridge-building including temporary bridges. Reflecting on past bridge successes and future methods of construction.
July 1960	Horse-power Riders	Tim Turner	The Royal Corp Signals demonstrate motorcycle safety techniques. Following The AA and RAC in their training programmes supported by RoSPA, and over to the Isle of Man TT to visit winner John Surtees and former champion Geoff Duke.
March 1962	Eyes of the Law	Raymond Baxter	A look at traffic controls in West Germany and their autobahns and how Britain can learn as they build miles of new motorway including the new Hammersmith Flyover.
April 1962	Scooter Commuter	Tim Turner	Amidst the jams, In ten years, the number of scooters on British Roads has increased from 4,250 to over 470,000, and the convenience of "Corgi" style bikes.
May 1962	Sea Horses	Tim Turner	A look at tugboats, without which any big port would come to a standstill, and ocean-going tugs, delivering their load across thousands of miles of sea.
September 1962	So They all Hover Now	Tim Turner	For passenger services large and small, the development of the hovercraft and how the declining ship yards of Clydeside are adapting to hovercraft design. Featuring the SR.N2.
September 1962	The Village Sleeps Again	Tim Turner	The arguments for and against building by-passes, featuring Transport Minister Ernest Marples, how these can be built through many urban areas, how objections to new routes can be overcome, and what effect they are having on previously swamped towns and villages.
January 1963	Birdmen	Tim Turner	Puffin, the man-powered aircraft designed and built by instructors and students of the de Havilland Aeronautical Technical School.
April 1963	Draw the Fires	Tim Turner	The railways are changing, with coal-powered steam being phased out and replaced by diesel engines and a network that is being modernised by new signalling, continuous welded track on concrete sleepers, and controversial closures of lines.
June 1963	The Car Has Wings	Tim Turner	Cars are carried through tunnels, on ferries, over the new Forth Road Bridge, by train, air ferry, and possibly by hovercraft in the future.
June 1963	Vintage Models	Raymond Baxter	The story of Britain's vintage car scene, including the high-speed trials at Silverstone, the Montagu Motor Museum at Beaulieu, and the famous London to Brighton run
July 1963	Pilot Aboard	Tim Turner	A look at Britain's pilotage services.
August 1963	Where No Tide Flows	Raymond Baxter	A look at canals and how they have been rediscovered by holidaymakers.

==== Disc 3 (1963–1965) ====
Date of Feature	Title	Narrator	Synopsis
November 1963	High, Wide and Faster	Tim Turner	Examining contemporary developments in road, rail, and sea transport
December 1963	Oil Aboard	Tim Turner	The story of the oil tankers and the crews that sail in them
December 1963	Report on a River	Tim Turner	Following the River Thames from its source in Gloucestershire to the Port of London, which is modernising services and keeping traffic moving.
December 1963	Europe Grows Together	Tim Turner	An urgent look at Britain's links with the Continent.
April 1964	Turn of the Wheel	Tim Turner	Exploring the various ways folk put old disused items of transport back into use.
May 1964	City of the Air	Tim Turner	A look at the many aspects of London Airport, with a focus on BOAC and BEA airlines.
August 1964	Behind the Ton-Up Boys	Tim Turner	A reflection on the nearly two million motorcyclists in Britain.
August 1964	Going Places Under Water	Tim Turner	Submarines and commercial diving, including the world's first underwater sightseeing bus.
November 1964	Living with Cars	Tim Turner	Analysis of what was being done at the time to cope with the increasing number of cars on our roads.
December 1964	Flying to Work	Tim Turner	The increasing number of private planes and helicopters in Britain's airspace.
February 1965	The Spirit of Brooklands	Tim Turner	The story of the Surrey motor racing circuit and its aircraft industry with a particular emphasis on the VC-10.
April 1965	Weather Adviser	Tim Turner	How special ships maintain a constant watch on the weather, whatever the conditions
May 1965	What Price Safety?	Tim Turner	A look at what was being done to make cars and roads safer
September 1965	Down in the Dumps	Michael Ingrams	A look at waste disposal and what happens to old cars when it comes to the end of their road.

==== Disc 4 (1965–1969) ====
Date of Feature	Title	Narrator	Synopsis
November 1965	Cats of the Sea	Tim Turner	The thrill of sailing Catamarans
March 1966	Breaking the Ice	Tim Turner	Looking at the Finnish icebreakers which keep the Baltic shipping routes open.
December 1966	Skimming through the Sixties	Tim Turner	Revisiting the Hovercraft and how it has been evolving.
December 1966	The Big Take-Off	Tim Turner	Assessing what was happening to Britain's aircraft industry in the face of stiff competition.
March 1967	Lighter than Air	Tim Turner	A brief history of ballooning and lighter than air flight.
May 1967	Just an Accident	Tim Turner	Accident prevention and safety measures with the HM Factory Inspectorate, ROSPA, and in-house company courses
May 1967	Scrambling for It	Eamonn Andrews	The motor sport of scrambling, which is attracting thousands of followers.
June 1967	The Straights of Dover	Tim Turner	A closer look at the 750 ships that pass through the five-mile wide shipping channel every day.
August 1967	Where Do You Leave the Boat?	John Witty	The problems of where to keep pleasure boats as more are built.
October 1967	Pushing the Bike	Tim Turner	The impact of the bicycle on the world today.
December 1967	Playing Trains	Tim Turner	Britain's burgeoning railway preservation scene, and a trip with the locomotive Flying Scotsman on one of its last main line runs
September 1968	The City's for Living In	Ann MacEwen	A response to the Buchanan Report with a focus on Bath and Norwich as to how British cities face the danger of the impact of traffic on the environment.
March 1969	All in a Day's Work	Duncan Carse	People who travel the world by air as part of their everyday jobs
March 1969	A Load of Pheasants	Duncan Carse	The journey of the intercontinental lorry driver delivering a trailer load of pheasants abroad, with the aid of the TIR convention.

=== Volume 2: Military ===
==== Disc 1 (1960–1961) ====
Date of Feature	Title	Narrator	Synopsis
1959	The Black Arrows	Tim Turner	The RAF aerobatic display team "Treble-One" Squadron, nicknamed "The Black Arrows"
1959	Ceremonial Soldier	Tim Turner	A look at the Grenadier Guards, and how they perform the differing roles of front line soldier and sentry at Buckingham Palace.
1959	Soldier Abroad	Tim Turner	The 3rd Royal Tank Regiment and their role as part of the British Army of the Rhine in Detmold, West Germany
1960	Under the Rocket	Tim Turner	Life at the rocket range in Woomera, South Australia, through the eyes of a young REME corporal and his wife.
1960	Thunder in Waiting	Tim Turner	Visit to an RAF base in East Anglia, shows Thor rockets and Vulcan bombers.
1960	'A Piece of Cake'	Tim Turner	The sport of parachuting and the territorials of the Parachute Regiment
1960	Return to Arms	Tim Turner	A visit to Germany to find out what kind of army the country is raising today under the auspices of NATO, with a focus on the mountain troops and how they train
1960	Submarine	Tim Turner	A glimpse of the life and work of the submariners of HMS Narwhal}
1960	The Rocket-Age Lancers	Tim Turner	The 9th Queen's Royal Lancers including the parade on their final day before they merged to form 9th/12th Royal Lancers
1960	Air Umbrella	Anthony Bilbow	Work and organisation of NATO’s Second Allied Tactical Air Force which forms part of a vigilant air umbrella over Europe
1961	Flight Deck	Tim Turner	The Royal Navy's latest aircraft carrier, HMS Hermes
1961	Pipeline	Tim Turner	Refuelling both in the air and at sea
1961	Girls Ahoy!	John Witty	A look into the Women's Royal Naval Service showing the full range of duties carried out by the wrens.
1961	Survival	Tim Turner	A look at various survival techniques with Peter Whittingham and Jock Wishart.
1961	Muscle Men	Tim Turner	Deals with circumstances and situations where "muscles" still count: in the Army, in wrestling, weight lifting, etc

==== Disc 2 (1961–1964) ====
Date of Feature	Title	Narrator	Synopsis
1961	Action this Day	Tim Turner	The tough training of the Royal Marine Commandos - some of Britain's finest fighting men
1961	Char and Wad	Tim Turner	The work of the NAAFI - Navy, Army and Air Force Institutes
1961	Test Pilot	Tim Turner	A film looking at the work involved in being a test pilot of jet planes, particularly concentrating on test pilot Jim Dell and the English Electric Lightning.
1962	Rendered Safe	Tim Turner	The work of a bomb disposal squad with Charles Lawrence, bomb disposal expert with the Royal Navy.
1962	The Last Battleship	Tim Turner	The story of the last British battleship, HMS Vanguard, as it makes its final journey to the scrapyard
1962	Amphibian	Tim Turner	A look at the DUKW ['duck’] amphibious military craft.
1962	Turning Blades	Tim Turner	Helicopters and their uses
1962	Plumbing the Depths	Tim Turner	The importance of surveying the seas and oceans and the part played by HMS Vidal in the surveying.
1962	Golden Wings	ACM Sir Philip Joubert	A look at some of the most important military aircraft through the decades
1963	The Black Watch	Tim Turner	Queen Elizabeth The Queen Mother visits the Black Watch
1963	Girls of the Air	Tim Turner	The work of the Women's Royal Air Force, with Dame Anne Stephens, Air Commandant Jean Conan Doyle, senior radar technician Carole Nicholson, and Mary McGurk.
1963	The Sky's the Limit	Tim Turner	Aerobatics, originally devised as manoeuvres to avoid a pursuing enemy, are today part of the training of specialised squadrons of the Royal Air Force. Civilian flying is also discussed.
1964	Forward, March!	Tim Turner	The infantryman as the indispensable soldier of the British Army
1964	Doctor on Call	Tim Turner	A North Malayan civilian doctor makes his regular and emergency calls by helicopter made available by the R.A.F.
1964	Trouble-Shooters	John Witty	The Royal Marines, whose 300th anniversary fell on the year this film was produced

==== Disc 3 (1964–1969) ====
Date of Feature	Title	Narrator	Synopsis
1964	Under One Umbrella	Tim Turner	The MOD and unified operations in Aden
1965	The Price of Valour	Tim Turner	The history of the Victoria Cross and the story behind some of its recipients
1965	The Jet Folk	Tim Turner	The lives and work of servicemen in the United States Third Air Force, mainly operating from RAF bases in East Anglia.
1965	Drummers of the Queen	Tim Turner	Spotlights on the drummers of the Junior Guardsmen's Company which supplies the whole Brigade of Guards.
1965	The Flying Soldier	Tim Turner	Helicopter training in the British Army
1965	The Cherry-Pickers	Tim Turner	A look at the history of the 11th Hussars, a regiment that celebrated its 250th anniversary in 1965
1966	Jumping Jets	Tim Turner	A look at the test programme behind the RAF Hawker Siddeley Kestrel VTOL aircraft
1966	Air Lift	Tim Turner	A survey of the air lift organised by the RAF Transport Command to maintain supplies of oil and petrol to Zambia
1966	Down to Earth	John Witty	Women of the WRAF take part in a jungle survival exercise, parachute jumps, and sub-aqua diving
1966	East of Suez	Tim Turner	Survey of the police work in the Borneo jungle of the British forces against the Indonesian confrontation and the provision of supplies via air drop.
1966	School for Skymen	Tim Turner	Training at the Royal Air Force College Cranwell
1967	Moving Day	Tim Turner	Moving of NATO SHAPE headquarters to Casteau in Belgium
1967	Free Fall	John Witty	Free fall parachute jumping by the RAF Falcons parachute display team
1968	Jumping For Joy	Tim Turner	The story of the Royal Green Jackets Skydiving Team
1968	Underwater Menace	Duncan Carse	The work of the Royal Navy in its quest to rid the sea of World War II underwater mines and other dangerous debris

=== Volume 3: Science ===
==== Disc 1 (1959–1963) ====
Date of Feature	Title	Narrator	Synopsis
1959	Follow the Stars	E.V.H. Emmett	Looking at the stars from the astrologer’s, the astronomer’s, and the radio-astronomer’s point of view.
1959	A Marriage is Arranged...	E.V.H. Emmett	How a marriage between steel and plastic is successfully forged at British steelworks
1959	Channel Tunnel	Tim Turner	The possibilities of the construction of a Channel Tunnel.
1960	Healing Hands	Anthony Bilbow	Deals with the advances made in surgery and anaesthetics and the activities of the Royal College of Surgeons.
1960	Testing Time	Tim Turner	The work of the British Standards Institution.
1960	Making a Meal Out of It	Tim Turner	A look at the processes of canning and freeze-drying food
1961	Press-Button Age	Michael Ingrams	A survey of how our lives are becoming increasingly automated
1961	Flood Tide	Tim Turner	Deals with storms, floods, and erosions along Britain’s coastline and how they are combated.
1961	Men With Ideas	Tim Turner	A look into inventors and how they go about getting their inventions accepted.
1961	Mystery of a Fish	Anthony Bilbow	Deals with the habits and the fishing of salmon.
1962	Rockets Away!	Tim Turner	A feature investigating modern rockets and the backroom world of research and their production.
1962	The Little Menace	Tim Turner	A look at medical research and developments, particularly in the field of penicillins and viruses.
1962	Trouble on Oily Waters	Tim Turner	The increasing problem of oil pollution on Britain’s shores.
1962	Any Old Iron?	Tim Turner	The scrap metal recycling business in Waltham Cross and Ebbw Vale.
1963	Caught in the Cold	Tim Turner	The chaos brought by snow and ice to Britain’s town and country and what is done to minimise disruption

==== Disc 2 (1963–1964) ====
Date of Feature	Title	Narrator	Synopsis
1963	Figure it Out	Tim Turner	Computers: how they are made, what they are used for, and how they may develop in the future
1963	Keeping Clean	Tim Turner	The story of the many thousands of people in Britain who are employed to keep offices, shops and other places clean.
1963	The Destroyers	Tim Turner	A look at pest control, particularly in agriculture
1963	Back-Room of the Sky	Raymond Baxter	A look at the Ministry of Aviation's centre at Boscombe Down
1963	People of Power	Anthony Bilbow	A visit to the Berkeley Nuclear Power Station where commercial power is produced from nuclear energy
1963	Second Chance	Tim Turner	The story behind prosthetic limbs
1963	The Key of the Door	Tim Turner	The Colleges of Advanced Technology in England and Wales with particular reference to Loughborough
1963	You Can't Catch Much from a Fish!	Tim Turner	A view of what the six months compulsory quarantine period means to the animals and birds that are brought into Britain.
1963	Men Under Pressure	Tim Turner	A look at some of the most dangerous, yet vital jobs in Britain
1964	Fings are Getting Smaller	Tim Turner	A glimpse into the scientific world where things are getting smaller by the day
1964	Salute the Engineer	Tim Turner	A glimpse into the wide range of jobs available for the trained engineer, along with the research and training that goes into developing their role
1964	So Much Flattery!	Tim Turner	The use of synthetics in the art of imitation
1964	Having a Baby	Tim Turner	The medical and social services which are available for expectant mothers whether the baby is born in hospital or at home.
1964	Power Needs No Passport	Tim Turner	The co-ordinated production and transmission of electricity in Western Europe
1965	Wealth Under the Sea?	Tim Turner	A look at the North Sea oil and gas industry

==== Disc 3 (1964–1969) ====
Date of Feature	Title	Narrator	Synopsis
1965	By Bread Alone	Tim Turner	Documentary on aspects of bread production and marketing, including research into the problems of staleness and how to prevent it
1965	Frontiers of Medicine	Michael Ingrams	A look at the advances being made in medical technology and the treatment of diseases
1965	Sugaring the Pill	Tim Turner	Facts and figures behind Britain's growing pharmaceutical industry
1965	Beating the Racket	Tim Turner	A study of the research into what was being done to reduce noise levels.
1965	Will Taps Run Dry?	Tim Turner	New measures for the collection, storage, and distribution of Britain’s rainwater to meet increasing consumer demand.
1966	Treading on the Gas	Tim Turner	The import of methane gas by sea from North Africa to Britain
1966	Boxes of Tricks	Tim Turner	The research which goes into developing programmed learning for schools, universities, and industry.
1966	The Givers	Antony Bilbow	Blood donors and the help they give in medical emergencies.
1967	What Price Ideas?	Tim Turner	How the National Research Development Corporation helps by governmental loans to develop new inventions for industry
1967	Cleaning People	Michael Ingrams	The dry cleaning business and the work of the chemists behind it.
1967	Press-Button Farms	Michael Ingrams	Survey of the revolution in farm machinery which leads to automated farming
1967	Keeping Tabs on Space	Tim Turner	A brief look at Britain's burgeoning space industry which culminated in the launch of the UK3 satellite
1968	Brain Drain	Martin Jarvis	A look at the problems arising from the emigration of many of Britain’s top engineers and scientists, who are travelling abroad for work
1968	North Sea Commuters	Martin Jarvis	A look into the lives of the men on the North Sea oil and gas rigs
1968	Their Lifeline – The Nile	Robert Tyrrell	The story of the Aswan High Dam in Egypt and the changes and improvements it has meant to the lives of the people who live along the banks of the River Nile.

=== Volume 4: Sport ===
==== Disc 1 ====
Date of Feature	Title	Narrator	Synopsis
1959	Jumping to Aintree	E.V.H. Emmett	The story behind the 1959 Grand National won by Oxo
1959	Derby Day	Unknown	A look at the tradition behind Derby Day at Epsom
1959	Kings of Speed	Unknown	A look at the motor racing industry and the part played by British cars and British drivers.
1959	Making an Effort	Tim Turner	Following the thrills of the Hampton Court Regatta, the Jersey Battle of Flowers, and shark fishing off the coast of Cornwall
1959	Pony-Tale	Tim Turner	A film of a pony from the time it is rounded up in the forest until, with its young rider astride, it enters for the high spot of the pony-riding year at the Pony Club Championships
1960	Four Men Down	Tim Turner	Deals with the thrills and dangers of bobsleighing on the Cresta Run, following the British Olympic bobsleigh team as they practice at St. Moritz.
1960	Ten Pins Down	Unknown	A look at ten-pin bowling in Britain today, and also oldstyle skittle alleys
1960	Smashing Through	Tim Turner	The sport of stock car racing and a visit to a race at Brayfield, Northamptonshire
1960	Solent Saturday	Wynford Vaughan-Thomas	Yacht racing in and around Southampton Water
1960	Saturday Fever	Cliff Michelmore	A look at the Saturday afternoon football tradition
1960	Out for a Catch	Antony Bilbow	A look at angling - both coarse and fly fishing
1961	Against the Clock	Raymond Baxter	Look at Life follows the RAC International Rally of Great Britain
1961	Man into Fish	Tim Turner	A film covering the training, both above and below the surface of the British Sub-Aqua Club.
1961	Ski Fever	Tim Turner	A look at what British skiers are doing, both at Glencoe in the Scottish Highlands, and at Murren, where the British Championships provide almost as many thrills

==== Disc 2 ====
Date of Feature	Title	Narrator	Synopsis
1961	The Ball at His Feet	Kenneth Wolstenholme	The competitive world of League football
1961	A Hundred Thousand Oarsmen	Antony Bilbow	A look into the sport of rowing
1962	Snow Business	James McKechnie	The flourishing winter sports business within Scotland, taking an in depth look at the famous Austrian Ski School at the Struan House Hotel in Carrbridge
1962	Riding it Rough	Tim Turner	The growth of speedway and all its thrills
1962	Target - The Stadium	Tim Turner	The raising of finances for the Commonwealth Games, held in Perth, Australia,
1962	A Flight of Fancy	Tim Turner	Pigeons, their fanciers, and racing
1962	Getting Wet	Tim Turner	The growth of the sport of swimming and the building of swimming pools in Britain
1963	See How They Jump!	Wynford Vaughan-Thomas	A glimpse into the world of show jumping
1963	It's A Gamble	Tim Turner	The vast scale and variety of gambling in Britain
1963	Queue for the Tee	Tim Turner	A look into the world of golf, both as a sport and an industry
1963	In the Kart	Tim Turner	The sport of karting which was quite new at the time of filming
1963	Over My Shoulder	Tim Turner	A look at the training in self-defence that is given to Women Police Officers and at the self-defensive arts and sports of Japanese origin
1964	Women with Leisure	Tim Turner	The rising popularity of ten-pin bowling among women
1964	Rulers of Racing	Tim Turner	The story of Newmarket, racing and the Jockey Club, told against the background of the Cesarewitch and the Grand National.

==== Disc 3 ====
Date of Feature	Title	Narrator	Synopsis
1964	Winning the Hard Way	Tim Turner	An investigation into the training facilities for athletes in Great Britain and their need for improvement
1964	Bookies at the Crossroads	Tim Turner	Study of the present state of bookmakers in England, their possible future, and competition represented by the tote.
1964	How Do You Swing?	Tim Turner	Study of research done by scientists and technologists on what is involved in the swing of the golf club from a physiological and physical viewpoint.
1965	Living on Skis	Tim Turner	Skiing in Norway is not only a sport but for many the normal way to get around
1965	Cricket on Test	Richie Benaud	The sport of cricket and its place in British society
1965	Room at the Top?	Michael Ingrams	Mountaineering in the Alps with particular emphasis on the Mattherhorn, first conquered in 1865
1965	Out of a Bomb-Site	Tim Turner	A new sport, cycle speedway racing, which started life in the rubble of the bomb-site
1966	Behind the World Cup	Tim Turner	The organisation behind the final rounds of the World Cup series played in England in 1966.
1966	Over the Sticks	Tim Turner	Survey of the current fashionability of steeplechasing in Britain, and the training of horses.
1967	Sea Riders	Tim Turner	The 1966 Daily Express International Offshore Power Boat Race between Cowes and Torquay.
1967	Racing to the Start	Michael Ingrams	The research and technical skill involved in building a racing car, and how they are produced and put to use.
1967	White Water Craft	Tim Turner	A documentary on touring by canoe, seen as a popular way to see the great outdoors
1968	Single-Handed Sailors	Duncan Carse	The attempt being made by ten men to prove that it is possible for one man to sail round the world without even one stop.
1968	It's Odds on the Fish	John Westbrook	A look into the art of angling

=== Volume 5: Cultural Heritage ===
==== Disc 1 ====
Date of Feature	Title	Narrator	Synopsis
1959	A Dog's Life	Vernon Greeves	Dogs as pets and as working dogs.
1959	Down London River	Tim Turner	Trvelogue of the River Thames
1959	Coffee Bar	Uncredited	Coffee bars and their clientele
1959	Garden of Tomorrow	Roy Hay	A trip around the Chelsea Flower Show
1959	Harvest of Hops	Tim Turner	The annual trip to the hop fields in Kent by people living in the East End of London.
1959	Island of Men	Tim Turner	A tour of Fair Isle, in Shetland, where live three times as many men as women.
1960	Top People	Tim Turner	The high-rise construction building in London including the Barbican centre.
1960	Rebirth of a City	Tim Turner	The reconstruction of Coventry, with the architect Basil Spence as an on-screen participant.
1960	Shopping by the Ton	Tim Turner	A look at London's main markets - Billingsgate, Covent Garden, and Smithfield
1960	Towns By Design	Wynford Vaughan-Thomas	A look at fifteen new towns being built in Britain to house seven million people.
1960	Fairs Please	Tim Turner	A look at fairs in Britain and Ireland
1960	Ringing the Changes	John Langham	A look at the traditions of bell-ringing and bell-making in England
1961	Hyde Park Corner	Tim Turner	The planning and progress of work on the new road scheme and underpass at Hyde Prak Corner and Marble Arch.
1961	The Big Blow	Tim Turner	Brass bands and their traditions
1961	Woman-Power	Stephen Potter	Deals with the growing strength of women’s periodicals
1961	Art is a business	Tim Turner	A look at the contemporary British art world, and the increasing interest in all its aspects

==== Disc 2 ====
Date of Feature	Title	Narrator	Synopsis
1961	Counting Heads	Anthony Bilbow	Made with the co-operation of the Registrar-General, this film shows how the ten-year census was carried out.
1961	Looking for Nothing	Tim Turner	A look at the various sights, in London and in Manchester
1961	The Dance of Life	unknown	English folk dancing including the Hobby Horse dance and the Furry dance.
1961	Why All the Rush?	Tim Turner	The tradition of the August Bank Holiday
1962	On the Map	Tim Turner	A feature looking at the history of Ordnance Survey maps,
1962	Chickens in the Mill	Tom Naisby	Industry in Lancashire, and how the reduced demand for cotton goods is being countered by the modernisation of some mills and the conversion of others
1962	Treasure Houses	unknown	A film about various stately homes in Britain, with a particular look at Woburn Abbey
1962	State Occasions	unknown	A look at the Earl Marshal of England and the College of Arms, and the work that goes on behind every state ceremonial
1962	Down in the Forest	Tim Turner	The work of the Forestry Commission
1962	Meet the Mayor	Tim Turner	A look at the office of mayor in Britain and the Lord Mayor’s Show in London.
1962	Under Your Feet	Tim Turner	The various services underground such as the underground railway of the London postal service, sewers, underground vaults and electricity cables.
1963	The Silent Change	Paul Rogers	The 200th issue of Look at Life combines the pageantry and ceremonial of the past with the drive for more exports.
1963	Signposts of the Sea	Tim Turner	Lighthouses off the Welsh, Cornish and North-east coasts, and the introduction of automation at Dungeness
1963	The City's Built for Shooting	Tim Turner	The film set - its design, use, and ultimate dismantling
1963	New Universities	Tim Turner	A description of what is being done to expand university training and improve facilities in England
1963	Rag Time	Tim Turner	Student rags in Manchester, Hull, Sheffield and Leeds raise thousands of pounds for charity each year

==== Disc 3 ====
Date of Feature	Title	Narrator	Synopsis
1963	Market Day	Tim Turner	Taking a look at the British country market, and the problems it is facing through changing customer demand
1963	They Learn as They See	Tim Turner	History and geography lessons outside the classroom
1963	Jazz All the Way	Tim Turner	Survey of the jazz scene in Britain today: record sales and the festivals at Cleethorpes and Manchester.
1963	Island Refuge	Tim Turner	The Island of Skomer off the Pembrokeshire coast and the work of the warden of the wildlife sanctuary there,
1964	Holiday Camps	Bob Willcox	The development of holiday camps in Great Britain and elsewhere
1964	Sound of a City	Tim Turner	Liverpool and the beat music scene
1964	Saving a Heritage	Tim Turner	The work of the National Trust
1964	The Way of Reckoning	Tim Turner	The pros and cons of the metric system and decimal coinage for Great Britain.
1964	Lady by the Sea	Tim Turner	Investigation of the present position of the seaside landlady in the face of competition from easily available Continental holidays.
1965	Early Starters	Tim Turner	A look at some of the independent and local government-sponsored nursery schools in Britain
1965	But Not on a Sunday	Tim Turner	A look at a typical Sunday in England – and the changes that are taking place.
1965	The Things They Sell	Tim Turner	A brief look at some of Britain’s less publicised exports
1965	Boys Without Girls	Tim Turner	The history of Boys' Clubs in Britain
1965	Members Only	Michael Ingrams	A visit to London's members only clubs
1965	City of Sailors	Tim Turner	The changing face of the city of Portsmouth
1965	Why Drown Yourself?	Tim Turner	The part played by voluntary life-saving organisations in helping bathers and water sportsmen and the RAF’s Air Sea Rescue Service in saving those in distress at sea.

==== Disc 4 ====
Date of Feature	Title	Narrator	Synopsis
1965	In the Livery	Tim Turner	An impression of the present-day activities of the great livery companies of the past
1965	The Needles Point the Way	Tim Turner	An assessment of the Isle of Wight and its industries
1966	Crisis in the Cathedral	Tim Turner	The plight of England’s medieval cathedrals threatened with serious decay, insufficient funds and no state aid.
1966	The Tower of Babble	Tim Turner	The building of the Post Office Tower in London and the part it plays in Britain’s communications system.
1966	On Tape for Tomorrow	Vernon Greeves	Some of the organisations which travel around the country recording traditional songs and stories.
1966	The Abbey Backstage	John Westbrook	Issue devoted to Westminster Abbey on its 900th anniversary and its administration
1966	The Shape of Things	Tim Turner	The work of the Ministry of Public Building and Works in designing new buildings, and furniture and consumer goods for the vast range of government buildings and contracts.
1966	Churchill Pilgrimage	Tim Turner	The homes of Sir Winston Churchill and the churchyard at Bladon in Oxfordshire.
1967	High and Dry	Tim Turner	The ceremony of the installation of the Lord Warden of the Cinque Ports and the life of the seven Cinque Ports
1967	IN gear	Michael Ingrams	The film presents the "in" scene of London by visiting some of London’s fashionable shops and the young people who frequent them.
1967	Hidden Treasure	Michael Ingrams	The present state of the British Museum, and the shortage of space for its many thousands of items
1967	Goodbye, Piccadilly	Tim Turner	A look at the changing face of London's Piccadilly, both above and below ground
1967	Change at The Tower	John Westbrook	A look at the day-to-day running of the Tower of London and how it copes with the growing number of tourists
1967	The Spoilers	John Witty	The need for co-operation in the conservation of the countryside.
1968	Queue for Gardens	John Westbrook	The greenhouse at Kew Gardens and the plants at the Gardening Centre at Syon Park
1969	In the Honours List	Duncan Carse	Britain’s honours system and the way it works.

=== Volume 6: World Affairs ===
==== Disc 1 ====
Date of Feature	Title	Narrator	Synopsis
1959	Marrakesh	E.V.H. Emmett	A vibrant look at Marrakesh in Morocco
1959	The Divided City	unknown	A look at the German city of Berlin and its division between the east and the west
1959	Operation Noah's Ark	George Cansdale	A film showing the rescue of thousands of animals following the building of Africa’s Kariba Dam
1960	Seaway	Uncredited	A look at the opening of the Saint Lawrence seaway
1960	Village of Violins	Uncredited	A visit to the village of Mittenwald in the Bavarian Alps, and its traditional craft of violin making.
1960	Gibraltar's New Day	Tim Turner	A look at Gibraltar as it prepares for an increase in tourism
1960	The Wind of Change	Tim Turner	A film dealing with the rapid and ceaseless changes to the social and political life of Africa.
1960	Power for Africa	Tim Turner	A look at Africa's increasing capacity to harness its waters, highlighted by the opening of the Kariba Dam on the Zambezi river
1961	Rolling out from Rio	Tim Turner	The building of Brazil’s new capital city - Brasilia.
1961	Lady of Japan	Anthony Bilbow	The development of Japan and especially its capital Tokyo.
1961	Flags over the Temples	Anthony Bilbow	A look at the impact of the South-East Asia Treaty Organisation (SEATO) in Thailand.
1961	City of Crisis	John Witty	Deals with the divided city of Berlin and the recent incidents on the East-West border
1962	A Problem of People	Tim Turner	A film looking at the problem of homelessness in the world, particularly amongst refugees.
1962	Eagle's Nest	Tim Turner	Record of Adolf Hitler’s retreat in the Bavarian mountains at Berchtesgaden, now a tourist site.

==== Disc 2 ====
Date of Feature	Title	Narrator	Synopsis
1962	The Maple has New Leaves	Gordon Tanner	A film showing the emigration to Canada of a typical English family.
1962	Chasing the Dragon	Tim Turner	A look at illegal drug trafficking in Hong Kong and the problems of heroin addiction
1962	The Trail leads Upwards	Tim Turner	A visit to a Native Canadian family, and a look at the construction of a new bridge across the Niagara River.
1962	GHQ Middle East	Tim Turner	A look at the British base at Aden, which at the time of filming was GHQ Middle East. There is also a glimpse of the visit by the aircraft carrier HMS Centaur which coincided with ‘Aden Forces Week’.
1962	The Wall	Tim Turner	A visit to Hadrian’s Wall in Northumberland, and a more detailed examination of the Berlin Wall.
1962	Out of the Sun	Tim Turner	A look at immigration from the West Indies into Britain
1962	Common Market	John Snagge	An assessment of the progress of the Common Market during a period in which its member countries had begun to remove trade barriers
1962	The Changing River	Tim Turner	A film looking at the changing face of the River Rhine.
1962	Millions on the March	Brian Connell	Following the state visit of Queen Elizabeth II, this film looks at India’s development in terms of farming and industry
1963	Call from the Wild	Peter Scott	A look at wildlife protection in North and South Rhodesia, and the development of national parks
1963	Out of the Bush	Tim Turner	A look at the emerging independent countries of Africa and the growth of urbanisation
1963	Men of the Woods	Tim Turner	How mechanisation is eroding the traditional skills of the Bavarian lumberjacks of Berchtesgaden
1963	Forging New Links	Tim Turner	A film looking at Ulster’s role in Britain’s productivity
1963	Gypsy Holiday	Tim Turner	A look at Europe’s annual gypsy pilgrimage to the Camargue
1964	Pick of the Bunch	Tim Turner	A glimpse into the vinification industries in France and Germany

==== Disc 3 ====
Date of Feature	Title	Narrator	Synopsis
1964	The New Australians	Tim Turner	A trip to Australia to see how the country is coping with its large intake of immigrants
1964	Men of the Snowy	Tim Turner	A look at the men working on Australia's Snowy Mountains irrigation scheme
1964	Singapore is Youth	Tim Turner	A fascinating look at a modern, forward-looking Singapore
1964	Off the Sheep's Back	Tim Turner	A glimpse into Australia's lucrative wool trade
1964	Constant Hot Water	Tim Turner	A film looking at the volcanic zone of New Zealand, and the hot water it produces
1964	Tide on the Turn	Tim Turner	A study of the new industry in Ireland and the efforts to keep the young people at home to reduce emigration
1965	Malta Milestone	Tim Turner	A documentary on the fate and development of the Maltese economy
1965	Women at Sea	Tim Turner	A look at the various seafaring jobs for women – from work on the great passenger liners, to merchant navies.
1965	James Bond's Island	Peter Hawkins	A look at post-independence Jamaica, and the country’s hope to gain a firm footing in the modern world
1965	Volunteers for Service	Tim Turner	Some aspects of the varied work being done by young volunteers from Britain for Voluntary Service Overseas in social and medical services
1965	Men Against the Sea	Tim Turner	The Dutch Delta-Plan sea defence scheme and what it aims to achieve
1966	The Curtain Changes	John Snagge	A look at the frontiers of the Iron Curtain between Eastern and Western Europe
1966	On Top of the World	Tim Turner	A glimpse into the changing way of life in Lapland brought about as a result of the revolution in transportation through the introduction of the motor-sledge
1966	Swedish Pattern	Michael Ingrams	A survey of industrial and domestic modern-day Sweden
1966	Market by the Danube	Roger Wesson	A visit behind the Iron Curtain to Hungary to see how it has changed

==== Disc 4 ====
Date of Feature	Title	Narrator	Synopsis
1966	The Beach	Peter Duval Smith	The changing faces to Rio de Janeiro's Copacabana beach
1966	Face Lift	Tim Turner	A tale of two cities looking at the ways in which Paris and London have set about cleaning up their appearance
1966	Incas in bowler hats	Tim Turner	A look at Bolivia, its traditions and its divided population
1966	One in Six	Tim Turner	A glimpse into life in Luxembourg
1966	An Island Awakes	Tim Turner	The re-development of Sardinia by capital grants from the Italian government for industry and tourism
1966	City of all Nations	Tim Turner	A visit to São Paulo in Brazil, a city which is growing continually each year
1967	Six come closer	Tim Turner	A close look at the European Community, showing some of the problems that the Common Market has had to solve
1967	Jobs where you like	Tim Turner	A film examining one of the most exciting aspects of the Common Market: the free movement of migrant workers
1967	Pipeline to plenty	Tim Turner	A look at how Kuwait is coping with its newly acquired wealth, and the provisions being made for the future
1967	End of a Polish march	Tim Turner	The Polish community in Britain today and how they have settled down in their adopted home
1967	Once upon a time...	John Witty	A trip to Denmark to look at the Danish way of life
1967	Living on a volcano	Tim Turner	A look at life on Ascension Island.
1968	Chinatown	Michael Ingrams	A look at the world of the Chinese who have made Britain their home, and in particular London's "chinatown"

==== Disc 5 ====
Date of Feature	Title	Narrator	Synopsis
1967	Inside Russia 1: Fifty!	Michael Ingrams	A film providing a background to the achievements of the Russian people
1967	Inside Russia 2: The Heiresses	Michael Ingrams	A look at the significant role of women in the Soviet Union
1967	Inside Russia 3: Childhood	Anthony Bilbow	A film that traces the story of Russian children, through kindergarten, school and university.
1967	Inside Russia 4: The Woken Land	Michael Ingrams	This film explores Siberian life east of the Urals.
1968	Winter Blossoms	John Westbrook	A look at the rapid changes taking place in the Algarve as tourism grows
1968	Man of the Desert	Uncredited	How the Republic of Tunisia is solving its problems, ten years after it gained independence from the French
1968	Something new under Everest	Michael Ingrams	How the past is coming to terms with the present in Nepal - one of the world's most ancient and secretive of societies.
1968	A new shade of red	Michael Ingrams	A look at the changing pattern of Czech life during the upheaval of 1968
1968	Coming of Age	Michael Ingrams	What has been achieved in India since independence from English rule
1968	Home is Tibet	Michael Ingrams	A film looking at Tibetan refugees, and the way in which their Dalai Lama has kept the scattered community intact
1968	The Sinking City	Martin Jarvis	A look at the efforts being made to prevent Venice from sinking
1968	Escape into Riches	Michael Ingrams	The richness of the arts of India
1968	In the shadow of the Wall	Tim Brinton	This film looks at the rebuilding of West Berlin, and the hope of reunification
1969	After the Queen's visit	Duncan Carse	The rising standards of living in Chile and the opportunities for Britain to increase her exports there following a visit to the South American country by Queen Elizabeth II
1969	Look at Man	Martin Jarvis	A visit to the Isle of Man to discover why it wants greater independence.

=== Volume 7: Business and Industry ===
==== Disc 1 ====
Date	Title	Narrator	Synopsis
1959	Market Place	Sidney James	A look into London's street markets and how they're suffering to compete with supermarkets
1959	A Car Is Born	Bill Hartley	A documentary looking into the British car industry, with a look at completed cars being tested on proving grounds
1959	Saving Face	Michael Brooke	A delightfully compelling look at the magic of the beauty business
1959	Money Talks	Tim Turner	A look at the financial institutions of London, including the Royal Mint
1959	Down on the Farm	Tim Turner	Looking at the changes taking place in the agricultural industry through new methods of mechanized farming
1960	Bottle Party	Tim Turner	The manufacture, uses, and disposal of bottles
1960	Under the Hammer	Tim Turner	A look at various auctions and the job of the auctioneer
1960	A Year for a Day	Tim Turner	A look into the business of Christmas and the individuals who spend most of the year contributing to the festivities
1960	Roman Invasion	Tim Turner	A look into Italian immigration in the UK, which began with the Roman Invasion
1961	On The Mark	Tim Turner	Looks at the production and testing of guns and their use on moors, ranges and in the various shooting sports
1961	Shares in Tomorrow	Anthony Bilbow	Deals with the working of the Stock Exchange
1961	Shelling Out	Tim Turner	Shellfish as a growing delicacy
1961	What A Pet!	Tim Turner	A look into the world of pets with a special glimpse at budgerigars.
1961	Ice Age	John Witty	The manufacture and the uses of ice
1961	And So To Bed	Anthony Bilbow	A focus on sleep and the best methods to get it. Also, with a look at beds, mattresses, and how they have changed over time.
1961	Coming, Sir!	Tim Turner	A glimpse into the hotel industry in Britain
1961	Tulip Town	Anthony Bilbow	The town of Spalding, Lincolnshire, and its annual flower festival
1961	For the Record	Jean Metcalfe	Shows the work of the gramophone record industry, from the birth of an idea to the finished disc, and how Helen Shapiro's hit "Walkin' Back to Happiness" was recorded, pressed, and distributed.
1961	Jobs with a Thrill	Tim Turner	Demonstrates some thrilling occupations, including a steel erector, a quarry blastman, steeple jacks and riding the wall of death
1961	Roses All The Way	Anthony Bilbow	The art of rose growing and the competition it breeds.

==== Disc 2 ====
Date of Feature	Title	Narrator	Synopsis
1961	Everything Stops For Tea	Tim Turner	A film following what happens to tea, from the time it is landed at the London docks until it reaches the domestic teapot.
1962	Lights Up!	Tim Turner	Exploring the world of lighting, including a glimpse of the famous Blackpool illuminations
1962	Fish and Ships	Tim Turner	A feature looking at the trawling industry and the lives and work of some Grimsby fishermen
1962	The Hat Trick	David Nixon	A look at the hats manufactured in Britain every year
1963	At the End of a Rope	Tim Turner	A detailed look at the story of the rope and its many uses in the world of today.
1963	Pictures Tell the Story	Tim Turner	The distribution of pictures to papers, magazines and television by wire, radio and Telstar.
1963	The Box on the Wall	Tim Turner	A look behind the scenes of industry, exploring what is being done to improve Britain's output including through the use of suggestion boxes.
1963	Crowning Glory	Tim Turner	The creation of new hair styles, the training of future hairdressers and the art of wig-making
1963	Rising to High Office	Tim Turner	A film focusing on the modern office block and in particular the newly built Shell Centre in London
1963	The Trade Winds Blow	Anthony Bilbow	A survey of the industrial problems of the north-east of England and what was being done to overcome them
1963	Glamour Gets a Passport	Tim Turner	A glimpse of the UK fashion industry and its export plans
1963	A Pinch of Salt	Tim Turner	An underground view of Britain’s only active salt mine at Meadowbank in Cheshire
1964	Silver's New Shine	Tim Turner	The new uses being found for silver
1964	The Golden West	Tim Turner	The story of the declining tin mining industry in Cornwall and how unemployment could be arrested through the development of new industry.
1964	For Crying Out Loud	Tim Turner	A look at the advertising industry, with a focus on how it works and what it does
1964	Stone Age	Tim Turner	The revival of interest in the uses of stone, showing how a modern stone quarry operates
1964	Ups and Downs	Tim Turner	The demolition of old buildings for the development of new
1965	Spuds Galore	Tim Turner	A look at Britain's potato farming industry
1965	Money in the Slot	Tim Turner	Documentary on automatic vending machines and their wares
1965	The Other Film World	Tim Turner	Survey of the industrial and research uses of film and language teaching

==== Disc 3 ====
Date of Feature	Title	Narrator	Synopsis
1965	Laying The Table	Tim Turner	Modern design in pottery, glass and cutlery
1965	New Hands on the Farm	Tim Turner	A look at farming, and how mechanisation has increased as a result of rising production costs and the unavailability of manual labour
1965	Down Town	Michael Ingrams	A study of different modern city centres, designed for modern living. Includes a look at Rotterdam, Coventry, Birmingham, London and Manchester
1965	Farming For Fish	Tim Turner	Experiments by the Ministry of Agriculture, Fisheries and Food and the White Fish Authority
1966	Putting More Beef into It	Tim Turner	A study of new methods of beef production to cope with the increased demands for supply
1966	The Sweet Life	Tim Turner	A glimpse in to Britain's colourful sweet manufacturing industry
1966	Living on Smoke	Tim Turner	A study of Britain's tobacco industry, including the latest in medical research
1966	Cover Story	Michael Ingrams	A closer look at the paperback book industry, both large and small scale
1966	Evening Paper	Tim Turner	Documentary on the current production of evening papers, and some of the modern developments which help to cut the cost of production.
1966	Music by the Mile	Tim Turner	How taped music is produced and networked by telephone line to places all over the country
1966	Home Tomorrow	Michael Ingrams	The contrast between the British and Swedish ways of dealing with the housing shortage.
1967	Roll Out The Barrel	Tim Turner	The ancient craft of coopering and the making of metal kegs for beer.
1967	Hidden Strength	Tim Turner	How banking, insurance, brokerage and foreign investments contribute to bridging the trade gap
1967	Putting up a Show	Tim Turner	A behind the scenes look in to the complex organisation of exhibition display
1967	Put to the Test	Michael Ingrams	The thorough testing of merchandise before it is put on the market
1967	Put Out The Flags	Tim Turner	The history of flags and flag-making
1967	On The Scent	Tim Turner	A glimpse into the perfume and fragrance industry
1967	Hopping Along	Martin Jarvis	A look at hopping, the traditional East London holiday to Kent to pick the hops, before mechanisation took over.
1968	Top Chef	Eugene Kaufeler	The life of Eugene Kaufeler, chef de cuisine at one of London’s most famous hotels.
1968	Can you read this?	Michael Ingrams	A look at literacy in Britain

=== Volume 8: People and Places ===
==== Disc 1 ====
Date of Feature	Title	Narrator	Synopsis
1959	Cause for Alarm	Tim Turner	A look at `modern' technology and how it was used at the time to make life more difficult for lawbreakers
1959	Dustmen's Day	Sidney James & Michael Henderson	A day in the life of a 'dusty' and an insight into the particular problems of refuse disposal
1959	Let's Go Dancing	Raymond Baxter	A survey of all that dancing involves, from amateur teaching to exhibition ballroom dancing
1960	Running Dry	Tim Turner	A look at the emergency and temporary measures put in place to ensure water is available during periods of drought
1960	Model World	Uncredited	A look at various model villages, including Bekonscot.
1960	Student Nurse	Uncredited	The life of a female student nurse, looking at the training and opportunities available to her
1960	In the Swim	Kay Hammond	A glimpse into the world of tropical fish, both as a hobby and as ornaments.
1960	Safe in a Boat	Tim Turner	Safety at sea, and the research into ways of improving current working methods
1960	Glamour Girls	Tim Turner	A look into the world of the fashion model
1960	I Protest	Tim Turner	A look at some protesters in Britain, including the Aldermaston marchers and Speaker’s Corner
1960	BRAINS - Unlimited	Tim Turner	How the schools and colleges of today are measuring up to the demands of the world of tomorrow
1960	Wheel Power	Uncredited	A look at the many aspects of bicycling
1960	Keeping Fit	John Langham	Shows the different ways in which people in Britain strive for physical fitness
1960	All Their Own Work	Tim Turner	An item covering how the inhabitants of the Cotswold town of Moreton-in-Marsh decided to save on the rates when the town needed doing up, and how volunteers reopened the Talyllyn narrow-gauge railway in Wales
1960	Holiday - With Pay	Tim Turner	A film looking at the part-time summer jobs available to students throughout the UK
1960	Women in Green	Antony Bilbow	An account of the work and organisation of WVS in Britain.
1961	Up to Scratch	Sidney James	A look at fleas and elephants in the circus

==== Disc 2 ====
Date of Feature	Title	Narrator	Synopsis
1961	Going to Blazes	Tim Turner	Shows the organisation, training methods and work done by the Fire Brigade in London.
1961	High Tension	Tim Turner	Looking at ways of relieving stress and tension in today's modern world
1961	Match Makers	Tim Turner	A glimpse at those who make intricate models from matchsticks
1961	Battle of the Bulge	Anthony Bilbow	The world of slimming, and a focus on all the things you can do to lose those extra ounces
1961	Prison on Wheels	Uncredited	Light-hearted miscellany covering the problems of parking cars in London, and a glimpse of the eight-storey mechanical park in the City that could be an answer
1961	Controlled Landing	Tim Turner	Inside the control tower of London Airport, showing the talk-down procedure for an incoming Comet arriving in a fog. We also see the 'Blind Landing Experimental Unit' on a Vickers Viking.
1961	Men in the Mode	Tim Turner	A look into the story of the male fashion world and how it is slowly moving toward gaiety and decoration
1961	High Rise	John Witty	An intriguing look at the world of lifts, known to some as elevators
1961	Relax, Relax!	Tim Turner	A light-hearted look at relaxation methods
1961	A Girl's Best Friend	Tim Turner	A look at the world of gems, how gems are formed geologically, the night classes in gemology held in London’s Northern Polytechnic, the world of the diamond business at the Diamond Trading Company in London, and diamond cutters.
1962	Earning Their Keep	Tim Turner	A look at the various uses of the horse and dogs - animals who very much earn their keep.
1962	Getting a Move On	Sidney James	A look at the work of the removal men as a family move from Suffolk to Scotland
1962	The Cinema Steps Out	Tim Turner	A look at cinema and the evolution of the motion picture
1962	One Horse-Power	Tim Turner	How police horses and their riders are trained and how they do their job.
1962	A Clean Sweep	Tim Turner	The problem of air pollution from chimneys and how they are cleaned and swept
1962	In Good Shape	Tim Turner	The importance of good industrial and commercial design and the work of the Design Centre in London.
1962	Blue Streak	Uncredited	Record of the construction and testing of Britain’s "Blue Streak" intermediate-range ballistic missile.

==== Disc 3 ====
Date of Feature	Title	Narrator	Synopsis
1962	...Through Glass	Tim Turner	A look at the interesting profession of window cleaning and the various problems faced
1963	Beauty - and the Rest	Unknown	A look at annual beauty contests with some of the contestants
1963	Island at the Cross-roads	Tim Turner	A look at the plans to make the Isle Of Man a tourist attraction once more.
1963	The Greatest of These...	Tim Turner	Some of the ways in which money is collected for charity
1963	As Good as Gold	Tim Turner	A look at the production of gold and its journey through London
1963	Rolling Home	Tim Turner	Caravanning in Britain today, looking both at holiday sites and permanent sites.
1964	Digging Up the Past	Tim Turner	Taking a look at professional and amateur archaeological digs
1964	Chairbound	Tim Turner	A visit to the National Spinal Injuries Centre at Stoke Mandeville showing what happens after patients become paralysed. Includes a look at the annual Stoke Mandeville Games.
1964	Glorious Mud	Tim Turner	The story of mud in our lives, from the motorcyclist and sports car enthusiasts contending with it to the men who dig out fuller’s earth for industry.
1964	Instant Homes	Tim Turner	A film showing how the conveyer belt idea is being applied to building houses and flats in Britain, with the result that a multi-storey block of flats can now be completed in less than six months.
1964	Do it Yourself	Tim Turner	Investigates the new found 'Do-it-Yourself' craze, a hobby that is becoming increasingly popular
1964	Who Wants a Statue?	Tim Turner	A look at the statues of the past and the statuary of today
1964	Donkey Work	Tim Turner	A look at the popularity of donkeys, including donkey racing.
1964	What's on the Roof?	Tim Turner	A glimpse in to the world of the roofer, and how new buildings are putting their roofs to new uses
1964	Calling the Tune	Tim Turner	A general look at music, the increasing popularity of classical music and the lack of composers
1964	Keeping in Touch	Tim Turner	A look at the devices that the blind use to help them overcome their disability
1964	Crossing the Channel	Tim Turner	A look at the fascination of some to swim the English Channel

==== Disc 4 ====
Date of Feature	Title	Narrator	Synopsis
1965	Tax Haven	Tim Turner	A look at life on the Channel Island of Jersey
1965	One for the Road	Tim Turner	How Britain tackles the problem of drink and dangerous driving
1965	Old School Tie	Tim Turner	A look in to public school life at Eton, Winchester, and Gordonstoun
1965	Blood and Fire	Tim Turner	A glimpse at the widespread activities of the Salvation Army in welfare work a hundred years after its foundation
1965	Putting on an Act	Tim Turner	A survey of the work in amateur theatricals and examples of leading 'am dram' companies.
1965	Tails of the Law	Tim Turner	Study of the training of police dogs, their handlers, and their contribution to police work.
1965	Cool Cats	Tim Turner	A look at cats of all breeds, including the fashionable Siamese
1965	A Policeman's Lot	Michael Ingrams	Commentary on the mixture of events in a policeman’s life, from traffic duties to watching for pickpockets and filling in forms after an accident
1965	You're Under Inspection	Tim Turner	Study of the contribution of inspectors to daily life of weights and measures
1966	Anything to Declare?	Tim Turner	The short film about the wide ranging activities of HM Customs and Excise
1966	When the Debs Come Out	Tim Turner	Survey of the unofficial routine of the modern debutante and the spots where they are required by fashion to be seen
1966	New Deal for Deer	Tim Turner	The work of the Forestry Commissioner stalkers who control and maintain the protected species of wild deer
1966	Away from the Blackboard	Tim Turner	A survey of the facilities and special subjects provided in comprehensive schools.
1966	A Fair Cop	Tim Turner	A survey of Britain’s policewomen and their specialised work.
1966	Jobs for Dogs	Tim Turner	A look at the work of trained dogs and their schooling
1966	Inside Jobs	Tim Turner	A glimpse inside Britain's prisons to see the variety of employment now available to prisoners in place of traditional punishment work.
1966	Fire Over London	Tim Turner	A film looking at the history of the London Fire Brigade and the London Salvage Corps, made to mark their centenary

==== Disc 5 ====
Date of Feature	Title	Narrator	Synopsis
1966	Clearway for Ships	Tim Turner	The work of dredgers in clearing the rivers and estuaries to make them deep enough for ships
1966	After Harold Fell	Tim Turner	A look at the traces of the Norman invasion which still exist in Britain today, both geographically and socially.
1966	Space for Adventure	Tim Turner	A look at the development of the adventure playground
1966	With the Lions	Tim Turner	Lions in zoos and roaming free in Longleat Park.
1966	Loads for Roads	Tim Turner	A survey of large transporters on the roads and their cargoes
1966	Things Out of Space	Michael Ingrams	A film about the sculpture in the Battersea Park exhibition, and the students at the Slade School of Art.
1966	Look - No Hands!	Tim Turner	The use and development of working models in laboratories to simulate planes and hovercraft, and radio-controlled models made by amateurs
1966	Topping Out	Roger Wesson	Laying foundation stones for new buildings and the contrasting ways in which the ceremony of topping out is done in Britain and on the Continent.
1967	Eating High	Tim Turner	An examination of the 60's trend of top-of-skyscraper revolving restaurants.
1967	No Place Like Home	Tim Turner	A presentation of some unlikely buildings that have been turned into homes - and one new home that was put together like a child’s construction set.
1967	Way Out West	Tim Turner	A look into the growing popularity of 'cowboy clubs'.
1967	Out of the Rainbow	Tim Turner	A film about colours, and the important part that they play in our lives today.
1967	The Hair Set	Tim Turner	A look at some of the top hairdressers and the women who patronise them, and how wigs are becoming more popular.
1967	Taking the Waters	Tim Turner	Aspects of the social services in Germany and how they are now being harmonised between the six member nations of the European Community.
1967	Collectors' Pieces	Unknown	A documentary depicting London as the centre of the world’s antique market and Britain the home of antique pieces
1967	Funny Business is No Joke	Tim Turner	The business of comedians and of writing humorous material for them
1967	In For a Fast	Michael Ingrams	This film visits three nature cure hydro-spas in Britain where diet, exercise, and rest are provided

==== Disc 6 ====
Date of Feature	Title	Narrator	Synopsis
1967	Who Needs Eel Pie?	Michael Ingrams	A documentary about Eel Pie Island, and its a jazz youth club
1967	Coming to Terms	Tim Turner	The problems facing overseas students when they come to study in Great Britain - making friends, finding somewhere to live, and raising enough money to live on
1967	Ark in the Sky	Tim Turner	Looks at the remarkable livestock traffic passing through London’s Heathrow Airport, which are cared for by the RSPCA
1967	Booming Good Wishes	Tim Turner	A short film covering the growth of the greetings card business
1967	Gardens to Order	Roy Hay	The changes in modern gardening techniques when plants are available fully grown and the necessity of waiting years to establish a garden has gone
1967	Pulling the Strings	Tony Britton	Exploring the world of puppetry, from Punch and Judy to the people who bring them to life
1967	Murder Bag	Tim Brinton	The glimpse behind the scenes of Scotland Yard’s Murder Squad
1967	So Much Hot Air	Franklin Engelmann	A look at central heating and how houses can now be insulated so as to prevent the loss of heat.
1968	Little Orphan Annie	Ray Browne	A comparative look between the children’s homes of the twenties and thirties and those of the present day.
1968	Out of the Inn	Michael Ingrams	A look at the changing face of Britain's public houses
1968	Gun Dogs	John Stockbridge	The training and work of gun dogs in Britain and America
1968	Mini and Mod (aka Many A Mod)	John Westbrook	The project given to the students of Hornsey College of Art, which was to design a flat that would appeal to the ‘minis’ of Carnaby Street.
1968	Stuck on Stamps	Jeffrey Kirkham	A look at Britain’s stamps from the time they are first designed
1968	The Big Sell	Tim Turner	Brussels and Toronto are taken as examples to show how British Weeks are planned and carried out.
1968	High Living	Martin Jarvis	A look at the problems of housing and growing population in Britain, and the development of the high rise block of flats to ease the problem
1968	Throwaway Society	John Stockbridge	This film looks at different types of rubbish generated by society, and the problems of how to dispose of it, including recycling.
1968	Some of My Best Friends are People!	Unknown	An examination of the relationship between humans and animals particularly wild animals in captivity

==== Disc 7 ====
Date of Feature	Title	Narrator	Synopsis
1968	There Ought to be a Law... There is!	Brian Hewitt-Jones	A light-hearted survey of some legal pitfalls.
1968	City Dogs	Martin Jarvis	A look at some of the varied amenities available for dogs in cities.
1968	On the Meter	Martin Jarvis	A glimpse into the world of female traffic wardens in London
1968	Painting People	Noel Johnson	How far does painting in Britain truly reflect the life of our time?
1968	The Ganges Might Lead Anywhere	Michael Ingrams	A quick survey of the creeds and beliefs of India.
1968	Switch On at Seven	Michael Ingrams	The work of the children at a junior school in Hertfordshire that has its own recording studio, television sets and language machines
1968	Hot History	George Scott	The work of the Press Association which feeds not only the newspapers, but also radio and television with their basic news service
1968	Where Have All The Butterflies Gone?	Martin Jarvis	A look into the natural world of the butterfly and some of the reasons why we seem to have fewer.
1968	Watch on the Coast	Tim Brinton	A study of Britain's Coastguard service
1968	Southern Miracle	Martin Jarvis	The development of industry that is taking place in southern Italy.
1969	Model Girl	Tim Brinton	A look into the world of the fashion model
1969	Gold in the Mud	John Witty	Scampi - its source, and its rising popularity
1969	Link-Up	Tim Brinton	The use of the radio in today’s police force.
1969	Bronze, Silver and Gold	Michael Ingrams	The Duke of Edinburgh’s Award scheme.
1969	Saturday Special	Deryck Guyler	The look at the work of the Children’s Film Foundation.
