= John Ryan (cartoonist) =

British animator and cartoonist (1921–2009)

- Born: 4 March 1921 Edinburgh, Scotland
- Died: 22 July 2009 (aged 88) Rye, East Sussex, England
- Areas: Animator; Cartoonist
- Notable works: Captain Pugwash; Harris Tweed; Mary, Mungo and Midge; Sir Prancelot

John Gerald Christopher Ryan (4 March 1921 – 22 July 2009) was a British animator and cartoonist. He was best known for his character Captain Pugwash.

== Biography ==
Ryan was born on 4 March 1921 in Edinburgh, the son of diplomat Sir Andrew Ryan. As a young child he had a fascination with pirates, every night looking out at his window wishing for some to appear. After serving as an officer in Burma during the Second World War, Ryan studied at the Regent Street Polytechnic, where he met his future wife Priscilla.

A John Ryan panel from the 1959 Eagle Annual No. 8: Harris Tweed in Man Eater!

After meeting Marcus Morris at his wedding, Ryan first created Captain Pugwash as a comic strip for The Eagle in 1950, although the strip was dropped after three months as it was felt to be aimed at younger readers than the target audience. Unperturbed, Ryan created Harris Tweed, Special Agent for Eagle, which ran until 1962. However, in 1957, after seven years, his first Pugwash picture book was published, which then led to a long-running The Radio Times strip and a television series made using cutout animation.

He also created Lettice Leefe for Girl magazine, which ran from 1951 to 1965, crossing over with Harris Tweed, and through his animation studio, John Ryan Studios, he created Mary Mungo & Midge in 1969, which featured his daughter Isabel providing the voice of the titular character, and The Adventures of Sir Prancelot in 1972. In 1981, Ryan presented The Ark Stories for Yorkshire Television, the series being produced by Anne Wood. Each episode saw Ryan present and illustrate a story about Noah's Ark, either prior to or during the Great Flood, each starring a crocodile named Crockle.

Ryan made most of his livelihood visiting schools across the UK giving talks on Captain Pugwash, however following claims in the Sunday Correspondent and The Guardian of double entendres in the names of characters in the series, they no longer asked him to visit. This urban legend led to the Pugwash books going out of print. Subsequently he successfully sued the two papers.

Ryan, a Catholic (his brother was the theologican Columba Ryan), provided illustrations and cartoons for Catholic newspapers, including the Catholic Herald, and several collections of these cartoons were published as books, and featured the recurring character of Cardinal Grotti. Towards the end of his life, he was resident in Rye, East Sussex. Ryan died in hospital on 22 July 2009 in Rye, East Sussex. He is survived by his wife Priscilla and his three children. Isabel now runs his archive, organising exhibitions and talks.

== Family ==
His brother was Roman Catholic theologian and philosopher Columba Ryan. His father was diplomat Andrew Ryan.

== Bibliography ==
Year	Title
1957	Captain Pugwash
1958	Pugwash Aloft
1962	Pugwash and the Ghost Ship
1973	Pugwash in the Pacific
1976	Captain Pugwash and the Elephant (Note: Did not illustrate.)
1976	Captain Pugwash and the New Ship
1976	Captain Pugwash and the Ruby
1976	Captain Pugwash and the Treasure Chest
1976	Pugwash the Smuggler
1976	Pugwash and the Sea Monster
1977	Dodo's Delight
1978	The Story of Tiger-Pig
1978	Doodle's Homework
1978	Tiger-Pig at the Circus
1979	All Aboard!
1979	Crockle Saves the Ark
1980	Pugwash and the Buried Treasure
1980	Crockle Takes a Swim
1980	The Haunted Ark
1980	The Weather Forecast
1980	Roll-Call on the Ark
1981	Crockle Adrift
1981	The Floating Jungle
1981	Crockle and the Kite
1981	Mr. Noah's Birthday
1982	Pugwash and the Fancy Dress Party
1982	The Frozen Ark
1982	Action Stations!
1984	Pugwash and the Wreckers
1984	Pugwash and the Midnight Feast
1985	Frisco and Fred
1986	One Dark and Stormy Night
1986	Bad Year for Dragons
1986	Frisco and Fred and the Space Monster
1990	Mabel and the Tower of Babel
1991	Sir Cumference
1991	Captain Pugwash and the Pigwig
1991	Captain Pugwash and the Huge Reward
1992	Jonah: A Whale of a Tale
1993	Fatso the Fathead
1994	Admiral Fatso Fitzpugwash
1994	Soldier Sam and Trooper Ted: The Battle that Never Was
1995	Giant-Killer
1995	Mudge the Smuggler
1996	The Very Hungry Lions
1997	Murder in the Churchyard
1997	Captain Pugwash and the Birthday Party
