= Mabel Lethbridge =

British writer and businesswoman

Mabel Florence Lethbridge
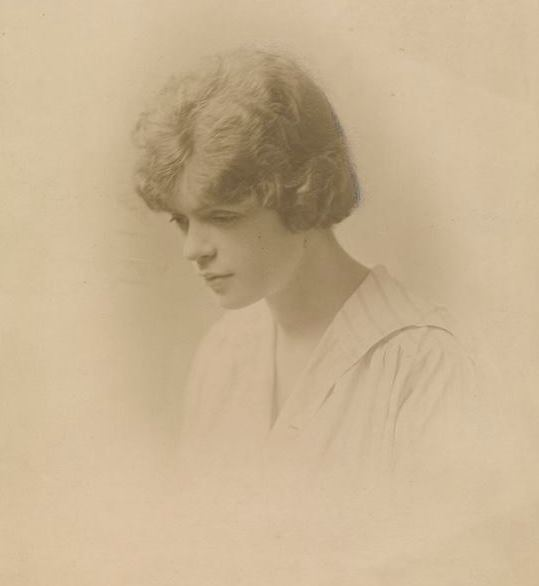
- Portrait taken for Imperial War Museum by Colin Gill
- Born: 7 July 1900; Luccombe, Somerset, United Kingdom
- Died: 14 July 1968 (aged 68); London, England, United Kingdom
- Other name: Peggy Lethbridge
- Occupations: Writer, street performer, estate agent

Mabel Florence Lethbridge BEM (7 July 1900 – 14 July 1968) was a 20th-century British writer and business woman. She was the youngest person at the time to receive the British Empire Medal, an award affiliated to the Order of the British Empire, for her services in the Great War as a munitions factory worker. She was severely injured when a shell she was packing exploded and described her experiences in a series of autobiographies.

== Early life ==
Mabel Lethbridge was born on 7 July 1900 in Luccombe, Somerset, the second youngest of six children of John Acland Musgrave Lethbridge (1869 – 1934) and the American Florence Martin (Mary) Cooper (d 1931). Her Grandfather was Sir Wroth Periam Christopher Lethbridge, 5th Baronet (1863–1950) and her paternal family were long established Somerset gentry. Her parents divorced in 1903 and the first volume of her autobiography is brief on her childhood years, although she later records that her father worked overseas in the Empire and that she had a peripatetic upbringing that variously included Kenya, Italy and Ireland. Her father was at one time a professional soldier and big game huntsman who had served in South Africa, but by 1907 he was a declared bankrupt in Kenya. He then abandoned his family and, although he lived until 1934, he did not see his children again, dying in poverty in Mexico. She suffered several years of poor health necessitating a period of convalescence near Ballinhassig and later at Coachford in Ireland from 1909 to 1912. During this time she received little formal education for eighteen months, before attending St Angela's Convent, Cork, an Ursuline foundation in Cork City. Her Mother's illness (which was survived) required the family to leave Ireland at short notice and return to London. Mabel then attended Haberdashers' Aske's School for Girls describing her period as a pupil as a mixture of good friends, boredom, bad food and teaching that she loathed.

== Great War service ==
In 1917 Lethbridge took a job as a nurse at Bradford Hospital where she tended troops who had been injured and maimed in the War. Returning to London she applied to work at the National Munitions Filling Factory in Hayes, Middlesex lying about her age since she was under eighteen years. She volunteered for the dangerous work of filling shells with Amatol explosive. On 23 October 1917 she was working on a recently condemned machine that packed the Amatol into the shells. It exploded, killing several workers and seriously injuring Lethbridge who had extensive injuries that included the loss of a lung, an ear and her left leg which was blown off. Although temporarily blinded she managed to apply a tourniquet to her thigh, an act that certainly saved her life. In recognition of her service she received the British Empire Medal for 'services in connection with the War, in which great courage or self-sacrifice has been displayed', her citation stating 'For courage and high example shown on the occasion of an accident in a filling factory, causing loss of one leg and severe injuries to the other.' The medal was awarded to her at a ceremony in Maidstone in Kent in 1918. However she did not receive an invalidity pension as she had lied about her age in order to work at the munitions factory.

== Post War life ==
There followed several years of earning a meagre living, recounted in her autobiography published in 1934. She worked variously as a house maid, sold matches and hired a barrel organ to entertain crowds on Armistice Day in 1918. In 1923, she spotted an opportunity with the long queues that used to form outside London theatres and cinemas and hired out chairs and stools for the waiting patrons to sit on, thereby earning the sobriquet "Peggy the Chair Lady". Her enterprise drew her into a criminal underworld that flourished in the aftermath of the Great War. In 1922 she married Noel Eric Sproule Kalenberg, a Cambridge University graduate and a member of a Jewish family of Dutch extraction long established in Sri Lanka. The marriage produced one daughter, but failed and they divorced in 1932, Kalenberg remarrying shortly thereafter in Sri Lanka. Lethbridge's liaisons included a romance with Silas Glossop, a civil engineer and one of the founders of Geotechnical Engineering in the UK and a long-standing affair with Colin Gill, who was commissioned to paint Lethbridge for The Imperial War Museum. Gill's studio occupied Lethbridge's first floor at her Tite Street, Chelsea residence whilst Mabel, her daughter Suzanne and a butler occupied the rest of the house. Suzanne Lethbridge posed for Gill's The Kerry Flute Player. and later as an aspiring actor toured with actor-manager Donald Wolfit, a friend of Lethbridge.

Mabel Lethbridge had recognised that people wanted living accommodation in Chelsea where her family resided and accordingly opened an estate agency with a prestigious address in Cheyne Walk. It was a major success allowing Lethbridge to remove herself from the poverty of the immediate post war years, maintain a house in London (part of which she rented to the artist Albert Crommelynck) and a rural retreat in Chertsey, Surrey. In her first volume of autobiography she describes herself as the first woman to own and run an estate agency.

== St Ives ==
In 1939 Lethbridge volunteered for the Ambulance Service working with her daughter Sue throughout The Blitz. She graphically but unsentimentally described this work in her third and final volume of autobiography Homeward Bound published in 1967. The severe injuries that she had received as a worker at the Hayes Munitions Factory necessitated many more operations and her health was not improved by living in a polluted London. In Homeward Bound she admitted that she still struggled to accept her disabilities and that her constant struggle to maintain independence was her way of winning the battle Thus when the war ended in 1945 Lethbridge moved to St Ives in Cornwall where she and Suzanne opened a bespoke toy and model manufacturers.In the post war period St Ives maintained a vibrant writing and artistic community to whom Lethbridge was naturally drawn, in part, because of her enjoyment of bohemian values but also as a benefactor. She provided the abstract painter Sven Berlin and his wife with a cottage and a studio and championed Bryan Wynter, the latter subsequently marrying her daughter Suzanne in 1949. Later tensions and strains arose between the tradition of established figurative painters of the St Ives School and the generally younger abstract painters.

In 1948 Lethbridge converted to Roman Catholicism and in 1962 her life was the subject of BBC's This Is Your Life. The guests for the programme included Lady Megan Lloyd George, daughter of war-time prime minister David Lloyd George. In 1964 she was interviewed at length by the BBC on her experiences in the Great War with particular reference to her work at the National Munitions Factory. An edited account was shown on national television in 2014 and again in 2016 as part of the BBC's commemorations of the war rekindling interest in Lethbridge's life.

Mabel Lethbridge died in London in July 1968 following yet another operation resulting from her injuries. She is buried at Longstone Cemetery, Carbis Bay, Cornwall. Her daughter Suzanne Lethbridge Murray died at Wivenhoe, Essex, in September 2013.

== Writing ==
In 1933 Lethbridge met and befriended the publisher Geoffrey Bles who persuaded her to recount her life in an autobiography Fortune Grass published by Bles publishing in 1934 covers the first twenty-seven years of her life. Her account of the explosion at the munitions factory in October 1917 that so severely injured Lethbridge is vividly recounted. "Now a blinding flash and I felt my body torn asunder. Darkness, that terrifying darkness and the agonised cries of the workers pierced my consciousness." The book sold out its initial print run within months and generally received good reviews. The Sydney Morning Herald noted that Lethbridge's success "depended upon her quick recognition of the change of fashions… One can marvel at this story of immense and unscrupulous pluck and can but admire the dauntless Peggy." A further autobiographical book Against The Tide followed in 1936. In the 1930s and 1940s she also contributed regularly to the Daily Sketch and to various journals and periodicals. In 1962 she was featured in a national television programme creating enough interest for a further volume Homeward Bound, published in 1967, that included her experiences in the Second World War and her post war life in Cornwall.

== Bibliography ==
- Fortune Grass (G Bles Publishers, 1934)
- Against The Tide (G Bles Publishers, 1936)
- Homeward Bound (G Bles Publishers, 1967)
