= Captain Pugwash =

Fictional pirate created by cartoonist John Ryan

- Captain Pugwash, from the title sequence of the 1974–75 series
- Created by: John Ryan
- Original work: Eagle #1
- Years: 1950–2008, 2022-present

Print publications
- Books: Captain Pugwash (1957); Pugwash Aloft (1958); Pugwash and the Ghost Ship (1962); Pugwash in the Pacific (1973); Pugwash the Smuggler (1976); Pugwash and the Sea Monster (1976); Pugwash and the Buried Treasure (1980)
- Comics: The Quest of the Golden Handshake (1983); The Battle of Bunkum Bay (1984); The Secret of San Fiasco (1985)
- Comic strips: Captain Pugwash (Eagle, 1950); Pugwash Ahoy! (1960-1965); Captain Pugwash (TV Comic, 1975-1976)

Films and television
- Animated series: Captain Pugwash (1974–1975); The Adventures of Captain Pugwash (1998)
- Television short: Captain Pugwash (1957–1966)

Theatrical presentations
- Plays: Captain Pugwash (1973); Captain Pugwash and the Inca Treasure (1974); The Adventures of Captain Pugwash (2008)

Miscellaneous
- Toys: Corgi Toys (1981); Vivid Imaginations (1998)

Captain Pugwash is a fictional pirate who appears in a series of British children's comic strips, books and television shows created by John Ryan.

The eponymous hero – Captain Horatio Pugwash – sails the high seas in his ship called the Black Pig, assisted by cabin boy Tom, pirates Willy and Barnabas, and Master Mate. His mortal enemy is Cut-Throat Jake, captain of the Flying Dustman.

== History ==
At John Ryan’s wedding in 1950, he was introduced by a friend to Marcus Morris, who was launching Eagle, and asked the artist to create a strip for it. When John returned home, he claimed that Captain Pugwash appeared without explanation. It ran for the first nineteen issues of Eagle, but was dropped due to being considered too childish, and John replaced it with Harris Tweed.

The first Captain Pugwash picture book, subtitled A Pirate Story and featuring Tom’s debut, was rejected by twelve publishers until The Bodley Head picked it up in 1957. The book became successful, and was translated around the world. That same year, the BBC commissioned it to be adapted into an animated short film, made using "captions". This was a form of cutout animation that involved levers attached to the back of characters.

All the voices were provided by Peter Hawkins, who had to be hidden behind a monitor due to his facial expressions made while recording being too distracting for the animators. What this did mean was that he could write notes in his script about incidental characters and be reminded of them as they appeared onscreen. Further short films would be produced and broadcast until 1966, and in 1960 a popular and regularly released Radio Times strip was launched to promote the series, running until 1965. In 1974 a new colour series was commissioned, with Peter Hawkins reprising his roles, and wider-reaching than its sporadically produced predecessor. Four of its 30 episodes were remakes of black-and-white shorts. (Note: Diamonds on Ice – Arctic Circle, The Cannon Ball – Hero Willy, Smugglers’ Cove – The Smugglers and The Flying Buccaneer – The Flying Buccaneer)

In 1997, Gullane Entertainment (then called The Britt Allcroft Company) purchased the rights to the character, with the intention of producing a revival series. The new series of 26 episodes, animated traditionally, aired in 1998.

A related book by John Ryan is Admiral Fatso Fitzpugwash, in which it is revealed that Pugwash had a medieval ancestor who was First Sea Lord but was terrified of water.

== Characters ==
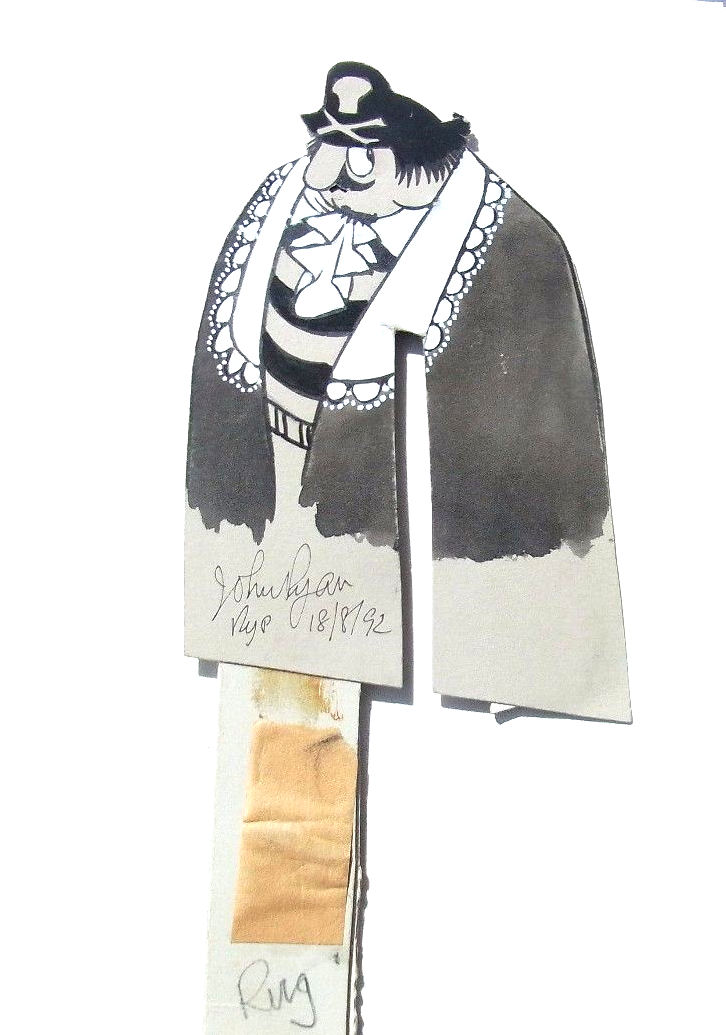
A screen-used hand-painted Pugwash card "puppet" from the 1950s when the series was filmed in black-and-white

=== Captain Pugwash ===
The pompous and arrogant but likeable captain of the Black Pig. Although he boasts of being the "bravest buccaneer", he is actually quite cowardly and stupid; and his greed for money often gets him into trouble. Nevertheless, he usually wins the day – either with the help of Tom the Cabin Boy or by sheer luck. Despite being a pirate, he is rarely seen committing any acts of piracy.

=== The Mate/Master Mate/Mr. Mate ===
A somewhat dopey character, who has a tendency to use malapropisms and to mispronounce common words. He has a teddy bear in his bunk and is quite mild-mannered. It is not entirely clear why he is the mate, as he does not appear to have any authority over the rest of the crew. He was present in the first ever Pugwash story, in which he was depicted as being constantly sleepy. Pugwash's adenoidal pronunciation of Master Mate's name appears to be the main source of the urban legend about characters' sexually suggestive names.

=== Barnabas ===
The most aggressive of the pirates, but in reality just as harmless. He is quite rebellious and grumpy, but also perhaps marginally more intelligent than Willy, the Mate or the Captain. He was not present in the 1998 series.

=== Willy ===
A simple sailor from Wigan. He appears to be the youngest crew member (apart from Tom). He is against using violence, and has been the crew's saviour on occasion (more by luck than by design).

=== Tom the Cabin Boy ===
Tom is the most intelligent and resourceful member of the crew – the only one who can cook, and the only one who can actually sail a ship. The rest of the crew found they were basically unable to operate without Tom, after he left with the captain when the crew mutinied. Tom is an expert concertina player, and part of his repertoire is "The Trumpet Hornpipe" (the Captain Pugwash theme).

He was portrayed with a Home Counties accent in the first television adaptation, and with an Irish accent in the 1998 series.

=== Cut-Throat Jake ===
Captain Pugwash's fearsome arch-enemy, captain of the Flying Dustman (a pun on the Flying Dutchman combined with a reference to the occupation of dustman). When he is not scheming to bring about Pugwash's downfall, he is a rather more competent pirate than his enemy, and always seems to have plenty of treasure. He speaks with a stereotypical West Country accent, and is easily recognisable by his eye patch and enormous black beard.

=== Characters added in the 1998 series ===
- Jonah

This character replaced Pirate Barnabas, who was in the earlier series. A somewhat pessimistic pirate, his catchphrase is "No good will come of this, mark my words!" Jonah appears to be of Jamaican origin. He is the tallest of the crew so he often hits his head on the ceiling of the ship's lower deck. He is also one of the strongest of the crew as he is the Black Pig's carpenter.

- Governor of Portobello

This character lives at the top of the island in a mansion covered in vines. He talks very quietly and his head of guard, Lt. Scratchwood, usually acts as a megaphone. He is deeply in love with Donna Bonanza and attends to her every need.

- Donna Bonanza

An infamous opera singer who is the love of the Governor of Portobello and has her own group of security guards. She owns a cat named Franco.

- Toni

Tom the Cabin Boy’s best friend, who works for barber Betty, and has dreams of becoming a member of the Black Pig.

- Dook

A member of Jake's crew who somewhat resembles Barnabas. This character appeared in the original series, but was never named. In the 1998 series, he talks rather like a New York gangster, but is less aggressive than in the original series.

- Swine

An Australian pirate who works for Jake. He almost always has a mug of grog in his hand. Like Dook, he appeared in the original series but was unnamed.

- Stinka

A Mexican who works for Jake, who sometimes finds him annoying. Again, this character was unnamed in the earlier series.

- Jake's Mum

The mother of Cut-Throat Jake, who serves as the Flying Dustman's cook.

- Lieutenant Scratchwood Toddington

The voice for the governor and the law for the town of Portobello. In charge of the guard and collecting taxes, he also spends his time chasing thieves.

- Jeremiah Rook

Portobello's rather dodgy merchant, who sometimes works for Cut-Throat Jake.

- Luscious Lil

A barmaid who runs Portobello's inn, frequently involved in Pugwash and Jake's schemes.

=== Libel case regarding double entendres ===
In 1991 the Pugwash cartoonist John Ryan won apologies and settlements from The Sunday Correspondent and The Guardian; the newspapers inaccurately claimed that the BBC took the series off the air owing to some character names being double entendres.

== Pugwashisms ==
Captain Pugwash is renowned for his exclamations, owing something to the style of Captain Haddock in The Adventures of Tintin:

- "Dolloping doubloons/dolphins!"
- "Coddling catfish!"
- "Lolloping landlubbers!"
- "Suffering seagulls!"
- "Staggering stalactites!"
- "Nautical nitwits!"
- "Plundering porpoises!"
- "Kipper me capstans!"
- "Tottering turtles!"
- "Dithering dogfish!"
- "Scuttling cuttlefish!"
- "Stuttering starfish!"
- "Blistering barnacles!"
- "Shuddering sharks!"

Cut-Throat Jake has occasionally been known to utter the similar exclamation, "Scupper me skull-and-crossbones!"

== Theme music ==
The series' signature tune was the "Trumpet Hornpipe", a folk dance that dates to at least the early nineteenth century. Some early versions of the tune refer to it as "Lascelles Hornpipe" and "Baloon Hornpipe". The composer and country of origin are unknown.

The original black-and-white episodes of Captain Pugwash used a solo rendition by the accordionist Tom Edmondson, who had learned the tune from watching Jimmy Shand's band in Northumberland as a teenager. Edmondson's version was recorded in the front room of his home in Harbottle, Northumberland, on 12 July 1954. The recording was made by the folklorist Peter Kennedy as part of the BBC's Folk Music and Dialect Recording Scheme and Edmondson was paid 30 shillings (£1.50) for his efforts. The track was transferred to disc for the BBC Sound Library and, according to John Ryan, it was later chosen as the Captain Pugwash theme by producer Gordon Murray.

For the colour Captain Pugwash episodes, a new recording of the same tune was commissioned from Johnny Pearson in 1973. This version used accordion, bass and acoustic guitar, and the finished piece was retitled "Shipshape". The recording was published by KPM and was later added to the KPM Recorded Music Library which gave Pearson the composer credit. Pearson’s arrangement of the theme has also been used as the goal theme for Fleetwood Town F.C.

For the 1998 series, a new arrangement of the theme was created by Philip Lane. Another arrangement appears in the audiobook versions.

The "Trumpet Hornpipe" itself is in the code of BBC Micro computer game Frak! and Acorn Electron game Zalaga, intended to be played when a pirated version of the game was loaded, a reference to Captain Pugwash.

== Captain Pugwash books ==
=== Original series ===
- Captain Pugwash: A Pirate Story (1957)
- Pugwash Aloft (1958)
- Pugwash and the Ghost Ship (1962)
- Pugwash in the Pacific (1973)
- Pugwash the Smuggler (1976)
- Pugwash and the Sea Monster (1976)
- Pugwash and the Buried Treasure (1980)

=== Colins Cub series ===
- Captain Pugwash and the Ruby (1976)
- Captain Pugwash and the Treasure Chest (1976)
- Captain Pugwash and the New Ship (1976)
- Captain Pugwash and the Elephant (1976)

=== Strip cartoon series ===
- The Captain Pugwash Cartoon Book (1977)
- The Quest of the Golden Handshake (1983)
- The Battle of Bunkum Bay (1984)
- The Secret of San Fiasco (1985)

=== Black-and-white series ===
- Captain Pugwash and the Fancy Dress Party (1982)
- Captain Pugwash and the Mutiny (1982)
- Pugwash and the Midnight Feast (1984)
- Pugwash and the Wreckers (1984)
- Captain Pugwash and the Huge Reward (1991)
- Captain Pugwash and the Pigwig (1991)
- Captain Pugwash and the Birthday Party (1997)

=== Audiobooks ===
In 1987, BBC Cover to Cover released various stories published in the 1980s on one cassette, read by the voice of Pugwash in the television series, Peter Hawkins. In 2012, the original picture book series was released on CD, with Jim Broadbent narrating.

== Television episodes ==
=== 1957–1966 series ===
Series 1–9 were produced and directed by Gordon Murray; Diana Potter for series 10. Series 1–3 do not have individual episode titles.

==== Series 1 (1957) ====
Peter Hawkins voiced the first episode, while Noel Coleman narrated the rest.

1. Captain Pugwash – 8 October 1957
2. 22 October 1957
3. 5 October 1957
4. 19 November 1957
5. 3 December 1957

==== Series 2 (1958) ====
Howard Marion-Crawford voiced the first episode, with Hawkins voicing every subsequent instalment.

1. 20 April 1958
2. 13 July 1958
3. 10 August 1958
4. 7 September 1958

==== Series 3 (1959) ====
1. 22 February 1959
2. 14 June 1959
3. 5 July 1959
4. 26 July 1959
5. 23 August 1959
6. 6 September 1959

==== Series 4 (1960) ====
1. The Firework Party – 21 February 1960
2. Surprise Attack – 6 March 1960
3. The Highwayman – 20 March 1960
4. The Captain’s Dream – 3 April 1960
5. Gold Dust – 1 May 1960
6. Abandon Ship – 15 May 1960
7. The Flying Buccaneer – 29 May 1960

==== Series 5 (1961) ====
1. A New Ship – 7 May 1961
2. The Cuckoo Clock – 21 May 1961
3. The Powder Magazine – 4 June 1961
4. Ivory Cargo – 18 June 1961
5. New Sails – 2 July 1961
6. On Trial – 16 July 1961
7. The Map – 30 July 1961

==== Series 6 (1962) ====
1. Night Attack – 4 February 1962
2. Ghost Ship – 18 February 1962
3. The Test – 4 March 1962
4. The Secret Weapon – 18 March 1962
5. The Crown Jewels – 1 April 1962
6. The Doctor – 15 April 1962
7. Press Gang – 29 April 1962
8. Man Overboard – 13 May 1962

From 3 October 1962, Series 4-6 of Captain Pugwash were repeated (skipping only "The Powder Magazine" and "Ivory Cargo"). The twenty episodes ran until 29 March 1963.

==== Series 7 (1963) ====
1. King of the Barbary Pirates – 5 April 1963
2. Arctic Circle – 12 May 1963
3. The Smugglers – 19 May 1963
4. Tug-of-War – 26 May 1963
5. Solid Gold – 2 June 1963
6. Heads or Tails – 9 June 1963
7. Mobertory Bay – 23 June 1963
8. Secret Mission – 30 June 1963
9. Pleasure Cruise – 7 July 1963

==== Series 8 (1964) ====
1. Black Pepper – 29 March 1964
2. Home Grown – 5 April 1964
3. Pirate Romance – 12 April 1964
4. The Fortune-Teller – 19 April 1964
5. The Wreckers – 26 April 1964
6. Twins – 3 May 1964
7. A Cure for Hiccups – 17 May 1964
8. High Society – 24 May 1964

==== Series 9 (1965) ====
1. The Secret of the Stinkas – 10 March 1965
2. The Submarine – 4 April 1965
3. The Haunted Reef – 11 April 1965
4. The Moon of Muddipore – 18 April 1965
5. The Escape – 25 April 1965
6. A Hairy Affair – 2 May 1965
7. Hero Willy – 9 May 1965
8. Total Eclipse – 16 May 1965
9. The Dragon of Pop Sing Ho – 23 May 1965
10. The Vanishing Island – 30 May 1965
11. Captain Moonshine – 6 June 1965
12. Carnival – 13 June 1965

==== Series 10 (1966) ====
1. Cruise of the Flying Pig: Part 1 – 8 May 1966
2. Cruise of the Flying Pig: Part 2 – 15 May 1966
3. Cruise of the Flying Pig: Part 3 – 22 May 1966
4. The Open Day – 29 May 1966
5. The Man in the Iron Mask: Part 1: The Three Musketeers – 5 June 1966
6. The Man in the Iron Mask: Part 2: Battle Royal – 12 June 1966
7. The Curse of the Pugwashes: Part 1: Ghastleigh Grange – 19 June 1966
8. The Curse of the Pugwashes: Part 2: Family Fortune – 26 June 1966

From 1 January 1973 to 19 April 1974, 20 episodes dating from 1962 to 1966 were repeated, preceding the colour series.

=== 1974–1975 series ===
1. Down The Hatch
2. Monster Ahoy
3. Mouse Amidships
4. The Showboat
5. Pirate Picnic
6. Flood Tide
7. Fishmeal
8. Mutiny on the Black Pig
9. A Shot Across The Bows
10. The Great Bank Robbery
11. Wedding Bells
12. Diamonds on Ice
13. Stung!
14. The Birthday Cake
15. The Riddle of the Rubies
16. Six Foot Deep
17. The Cannon Ball
18. Witches Brew
19. The Golden Trail
20. Pirate of the Year
21. Easy Money
22. The Plank
23. Voyage of Discovery
24. Fair Exchange
25. Smugglers’ Cove
26. The Flying Buccaneer
27. The Island of the Dodos
28. Caught in the Act
29. A Tell Tale Tail
30. Off With His Head

=== 1998 series ===
1. The Stowaway Sheep
2. The Portobello Plague
3. The Doubledealing Duchess
4. The Emperor's New Clothes
5. The Boat Race
6. The Dingly Dangly Crab
7. Chest of Drawers
8. The Vanishing Ship
9. Hot Chocolate
10. The Fat Cat
11. The Pandemonium Parrot
12. The Brush With Art
13. A Hair-Raising Day
14. Fiddle De Diamonds
15. The Melodious Mermaid
16. The Titanic Teapot
17. The New Cabin Boy
18. Treasure Trail
19. Peppercorn Pistols
20. Sticky Moments
21. Muddling Monsters
22. The Megamango Monkeys
23. King Pugwash
24. The Devil's Dog
25. Perfumes of Arabia
26. The Admiral's Fireworks

== Planned film ==
In May 2017, a live-action film adaptation was announced, to be directed by John Hay, produced by Atticus Films and starring Nick Frost as Captain Pugwash and Jason Flemyng in an unknown role. Production was set to begin in 2018, with the plot following Captain Pugwash travelling to Botany Bay, where he eventually finds himself at the helm of The Black Pig on a mission to rescue Tom the Cabin Boy's father, who is marooned on a volcanic island. In March 2021, Frost said that he believes the film will be unlikely to be produced because of budget issues, however the following year Isabel Ryan, daughter of creator John, said she wants the film to have the involvement of Rye.

== Stage adaptations ==
On 17 December 1973, a theatre show, Captain Pugwash, written by Ryan and John Kennett, opened at the King's Road Theatre in Chelsea, London. Directed by John Ingram and designed by John Marsh, the entertainment for children played twelve performances a week (twice daily, Monday to Saturday) until 12 January 1974. Edward Philips as Pugwash headed a cast of live actors playing characters including Tom and Cut-Throat Jake. The following year a second play was performed, entitled Captain Pugwash and the Inca Treasure, from 19 December 1974 to 18 January 1975. In 2008 a new show was performed with Richard Alan in the title role.

== Merchandise ==
According to Isabel Ryan, her father John did not partake in merchandising unless somebody had created something for him. Waves of merchandise were first produced with the 1974 series, including badges, T-shirts, and jigsaw puzzles. In 1981, Corgi Toys produced a model of the Black Pig, complete with stand-up figures of Pugwash and Tom the Cabin Boy. John himself remarked that the franchise did not sell well in the United States due to the titular character being "too innocuous". For the 1998 series, Vivid Imaginations created many more toys, including miniatures and plushies, both in eight inches and fourteen inches. Six inch Happy Meal plushies were also available as part of the Children's Favourites line.

=== Home video releases ===
==== 1974–1975 series ====
The first home media release for the franchise occurred in 1982, courtesy of RPTA Video. The tape was also released on CED Videodisc. In 1987, Tempo Video issued a re-release, which was also sold in Australia via Thorn EMI and the US via Family Home Entertainment.

VHS video title	Catalog number	Year of release	Episodes
Captain Pugwash	BP 4 039; V9024	November 1982 (RPTA VHS) 1983 (RPTA CED Videodisc) 5 October 1987 (Tempo Video)	Down the Hatch; The Cannon Ball; Pirate Picnic; Fishmeal; Mutiny on the Black Pig; The Great Bank Robbery; Wedding Bells; Diamonds on Ice; The Birthday Cake; Witches Brew; Six Foot Deep; Pirate of the Year; The Plank; Voyage of Discovery; Smuggler’s Cove; Island of the Dodos; A Tell-Tale Tail; Off with his Head

Between 1990 and 1991, BBC Video released eighteen episodes across two tapes.

VHS video title	Catalog number	Year of release	Episodes
Captain Pugwash: Seafaring Tales	BBCV 4360	25 June 1990	The Plank; Voyage of Discovery; Smuggler’s Cove; Island of the Dodos; A Tell-Tale Tail; Off with his Head; Fair Exchange; The Golden Trail; Caught in the Act
Captain Pugwash: The Flying Buccaneer	BBCV 4451	4 February 1991	The Flying Buccaneer; A Shot Across the Bows; The Showboat; Monster Ahoy; Stung!; Easy Money; The Riddle of the Rubies; Flood Tide; Mouse Amidships

In 2005, HIT Entertainment (which had purchased Gullane Entertainment three years prior) released all 30 episodes on DVD.
It was exclusive to HMV upon release.

DVD title	Catalog number	Year of release	Episodes
The Complete Classic Captain Pugwash	HIT42600	18 March 2005	Down The Hatch; Cannon Ball; Sea Monster; Mouse Amidships; Showboat; Flood Tide; Pirate Picnic; Fishmeal; Mutiny on the Black Pig; The Great Bank Robbery; A Shot Across The Bows; Wedding Bells; Stung!; The Golden Trail; Diamonds on Ice; Birthday Cake; Witches Brew; Six Foot Deep; The Riddle of the Rubies; Pirate of the Year; Easy Money; The Plank; A Fair Exchange; Voyage of Discovery; Smugglers’ Cove; The Flying Buccaneer; The Island of the Dodos; Caught in the Act; A Tell Tale Tail; Off With His Head

==== 1998 series ====
In 1999, Video Collection International (Gullane Entertainment's home video partner) released three tapes.

VHS video title	Catalog number	Year of release	Episodes
Captain Pugwash Sets Sail	VC1510	22 March 1999	The Boat Race; The Stowaway Sheep; The Portobello Plague; The Double-Dealing Duchess; The Emperor’s New Clothes
Captain Pugwash Ahoy	VC1511	23 August 1999	The Fat Cat; The Vanishing Ship; The Dingly Dangly Crab; Chest of Drawers; Hot Chocolate
Stuttering Starfish	VC1512	11 October 1999	The Pandemonium Parrot; The Brush with Art; The Melodious Mermaid; A Hair-Raising Day; Fiddle de Diamonds

In 2005, HIT Entertainment (which again, had purchased Gullane Entertainment three years prior) released 6 episodes on DVD.

DVD title	Catalog number	Year of release	Episodes
Captain Pugwash: Sticky Moments	HIT42502	5 September 2005	Sticky Moment; The Stowaway Sheep; The Portobello Plague; The Double-Dealing Duchess; The Emperor’s New Clothes; The Boat Race

This was followed in 2006 by all 26 episodes of the 1998 series across three discs exclusive to Australia.

== See also ==
- List of animated television series
