= Harris Tweed (comic strip) =

A John Ryan panel from the 1959 Eagle Annual No. 8: Harris Tweed in Man Eater!

Harris Tweed was a British comic strip series, fully named Harris Tweed, Special Agent, later retitled Harris Tweed – Super Sleuth, which appeared in the British comic strip magazine The Eagle (1950–1962). The strip was drawn by John Ryan and centered on a monocled, rotund, bumbling secret agent, Harris Tweed, who, along with his far more capable boy sidekick, simply known as "Boy", managed to get into all manner of scrapes, somehow always managing to make good in the end.
