= Dominicans in Ireland =

Irish religious order

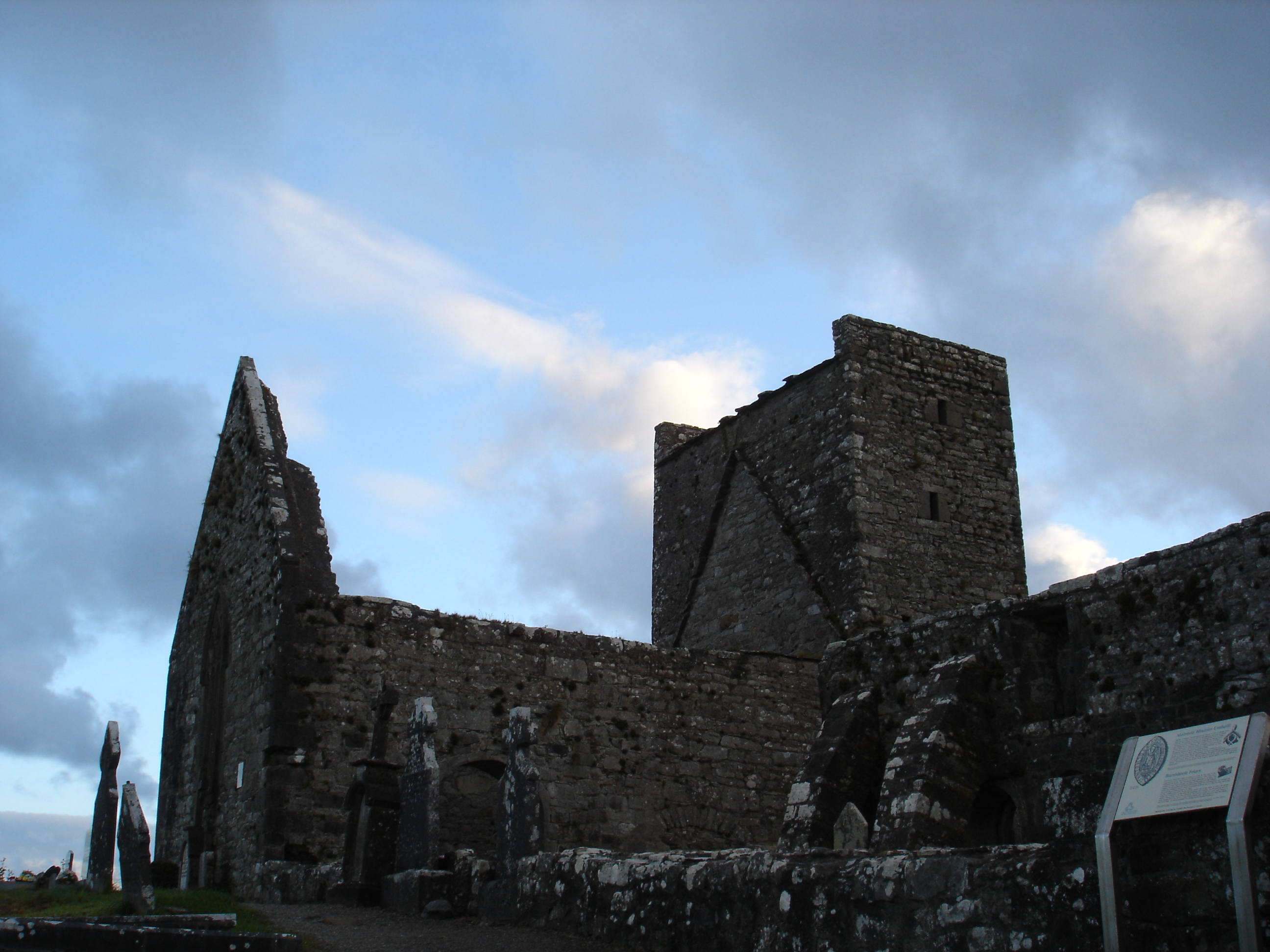
Ruins of the Dominican Friary at Burrishoole, County Mayo

The Dominican Order (Order of Preachers) has been present in Ireland since 1224 when the first foundation was established in Dublin, a monastic settlement north of the River Liffey, where the Four Courts is located today. This was quickly followed by Drogheda (also 1224), Kilkenny (1225), Waterford (1226), Limerick (1227) and Cork (city) (1229). The order was reestablished in the 19th century after having been driven out in the 17th century by laws against Catholic religious orders. During the Penal Laws, as other Irish Colleges were established on the continent, in 1633 the Irish Dominicans established, the College of Corpo Santo, Lisbon and College of the Holy Cross, Louvain (1624-1797) to train clergy for ministering in Ireland. San Clemente al Laterano in Rome, was entrusted to the Irish Dominicans in 1677. In 1855, St. Mary's Priory, Tallaght, was established to train members of the order, who would complete their clerical studies in Rome and be ordained in the Basilica San Clemente.

== Dominican convents, retreat houses, and houses of study ==
There are currently communities of Dominican friars in the following places in Ireland:

- Convent and seminary in Cork city
- Convent, house of study and retreat house in Tallaght
- Community in Athy
- Others

There are also communities of Dominican nuns in a number of places.

== Dominican colleges ==
The Dominican orders have made a significant contribution to Irish education. In 1900 the Dominican Sisters established St. Mary's Teacher Training College, in Belfast, which has evolved into St Mary's University College, Belfast. The order delivered the first teacher training diploma course in Ireland at St Dominic's Training College, Eccles Street, which was established in 1908, allowing aspiring teachers to gain a Teaching Diploma from Cambridge University. From 1902 the Dominicans on Eccles street prepared girls for University exams with the Royal University of Ireland, as they also did at Sion Hill.

=== Secondary schools in Ireland ===
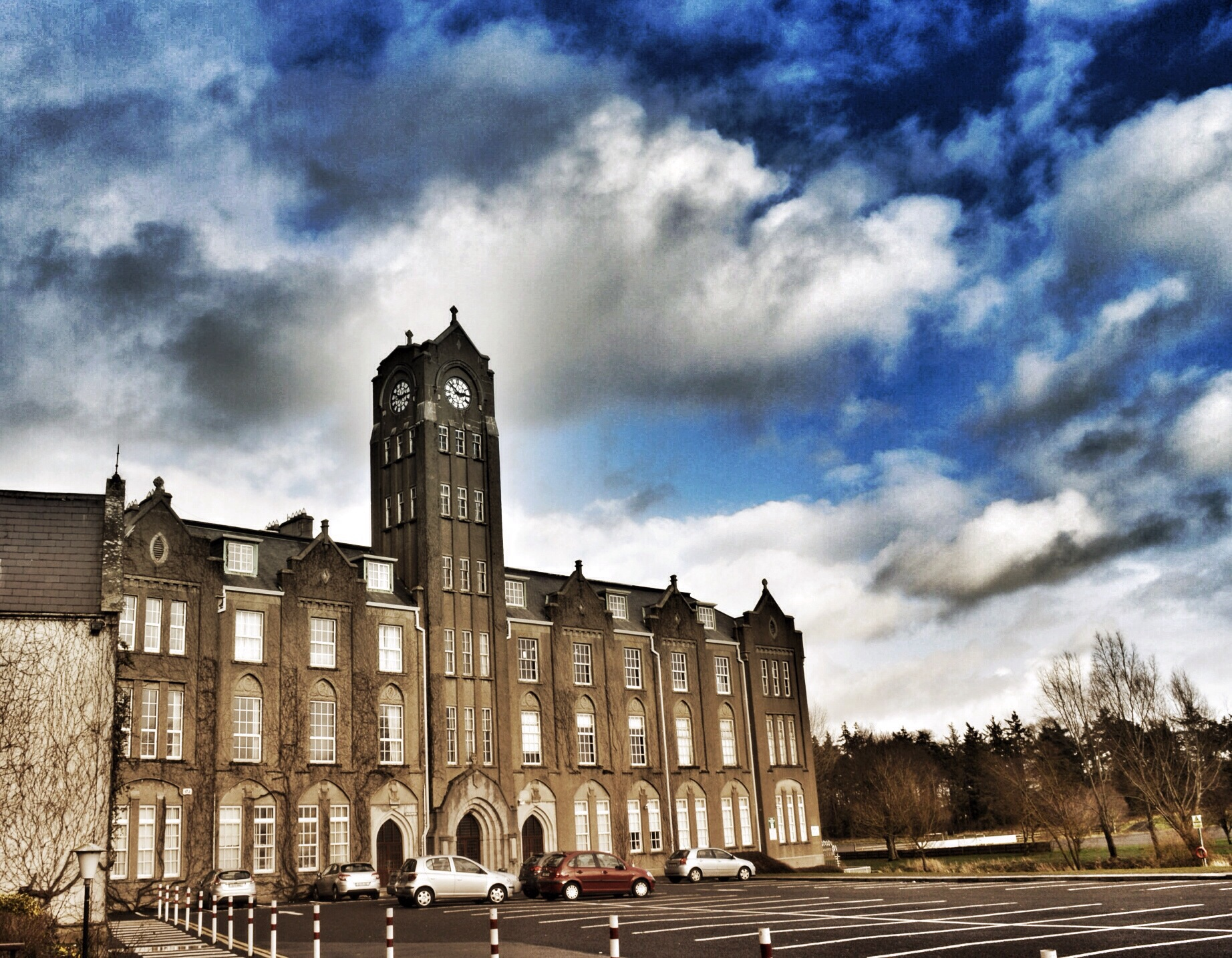
Newbridge College in County Kildare

- Dominican College, Portstewart - a grammar school in Portstewart on the north coast of Ireland
- Dominican College Muckross Park
- Dominican College, Fortwilliam - a grammar school for girls in north Belfast
- Dominican College Taylor's Hill - a secondary school for girls in Galway
- Dominican College Sion Hill - a girls' secondary school in Blackrock, County Dublin
- Dominican College Griffith Avenue - a girls' secondary school in Drumcondra, Dublin (formerly on Eccles Street)
- Newbridge College - a private co-education day boarding school in County Kildare
- St. Dominic's College, Cabra - a secondary school for girls in Cabra, Dublin.
- St Dominic's Grammar School for Girls - a grammar school for girls located on the Falls Road, Belfast
- St Rose's Dominican College - this school was established by the Dominicans in Beechmount area, Belfast in 1962. In 2019, it merged with Christian Brothers School, Glen Road and Corpus Christi College to form All Saints College / Coláiste na Naomh Uile.

=== Further education / houses of study ===
- Dominican Biblical Institute (2000-2015), was a biblical research centre in Limerick, Ireland
- St. Mary's Priory, Tallaght, Dublin, it was the Dominican House of Studies until the year 2000, it is the home of The Priory Institute, which provides degrees and masters programmes by distance learning, validated by the Technological University Dublin
- St. Saviour's Priory, Dublin since 2000, houses the Studium, the Centre of Institutional Studies of the Irish Dominican friars.
- St. Mary's Dominican Church and Priory, Pope's Quay in Cork is the Novitiate for the Irish Dominican Province, and they also run courses in theology.

=== International ===
- Dominican Convent High School, Harare, Zimbabwe, founded by an Irish Dominican nun
- Saint Dominic's International School, near Lisbon, Portugal, founded by Irish Dominican sisters

== Irish Dominicans outside Ireland ==
Irish Dominicans have been active outside Ireland, taking up a number of roles and responsibilities. From 1863 many Irish Dominican priests, brothers, and nuns, served the Roman Catholic Archdiocese of Port of Spain, Trinidad and Tobago, as the Irish Dominican Order were given responsibility for the dioceses, with a number serving as Bishops. In 1962 the Irish Dominicans were asked by the Vatican to take over the church mission in Tehran, Iran, building and maintaining Saint Abraham's Church, Tehran. Irish Dominicans have owned the Basilica of San Clemente and the surrounding building complex since 1667 when Pope Urban VIII gave them refuge, it has become a house of study and residence for Dominicans when studying in Rome. The Irish Dominican College, Louvain, (Collège des Dominicains Irlandais, Louvain), founded in 1659, was also following the French revolution in 1795. Irish Dominican presence in Lisbon goes back to when they sought refuge and clerical training setting up a college, during penal times, a Convent, Convento De Nossa Senhora Do Bom Sucesso, was also established in 1633 which closed in 2006. Today the order maintains one friar in Lisbon who serves the Irish and the English speaking communities there, the convents mission continues under Fundação Obra Social das Religiosas Dominicanas Irlandesas, (FOSRDI).

== Notable Irish Dominicans ==
- Jofroi of Waterford, fl. 1300?, scribe, translator
- Edmund Bourke, (d. 1738), author
- John Brett, O.P., Bishop of Killala (1743–1748)
- Thomas Burke, (1709 - 25 September 1776), Bishop of Ossory
- Thomas Nicholas Burke, (8 September 1830 - 2 July 1882), preacher
- Aengus Buckley, (1913–78). art teacher and artist (painting)
- Damian Louis Byrne, O.P., (1929-1996), 83rd, Master of the Order (1983-1992), second Irishman to hold the post.
- James Joseph Carbery, (1 May 1823 - 17 December 1887), Bishop of Hamilton, Canada
- Richard Luke Concanen, consecrated as the first Bishop of New York
- Bishop John Connolly, second Bishop of New York (1814-1825)
- Anthony Dominic Fahy, (11 January 1805 - 20 February 1871), missionary in Argentina
- Henry Flanagan, (1918–92), teacher, musician, artist and sculptor
- Edmund Ffrench, O.P., Bishop of Kilmacduagh and Kilfenora
- Andrew Fitzgerald, O.P., President of St. Patrick's, Carlow College (1814–1843), and Tithe War campaigner
- Wilfrid Harrington, (b. 1927), theologian
- Roche MacGeoghegan, (1580 - 26 May 1644), Bishop of Kildare
- Brian McKevitt, publisher of Alive!, a conservative Catholic newspaper
- Michael Peter MacMahon, O.P., Bishop of Killaloe
- Fr. Joseph Mullooly, (1812 - 1880), archaeologist, superior Irish Dominican College, Rome
- Dominic Maguire, O.P., chaplain-general for the army of James II in Ireland, and Archbishop of Armagh.
- Ambrose O'Conor, MTh, Provincial of the Irish Dominicans, nominated as Vicar Apostolic of Ardagh 1709, died 1711.
- Daniel O'Daly, (1595 - 30 June 1662), diplomat and historian, first rector of Dominican Corpo Santo College, Lisbon
- Francis Joseph O'Finan, O.P., Bishop of Killala
- Geraldine Smyth, O.P., Prioress International Dominican sisters (1998-2004), Director of the Irish School of Ecumenics(1994-1999)
- John Thomas Troy, (10 May 1739 - 11 May 1823), Archbishop of Dublin

=== Irish Dominican bishops Port of Spain ===
- Patrick Vincent Flood, O.P., Archbishop of Port of Spain (1889–1907)
- John Pius Dowling, O.P., Archbishop of Port of Spain (1909–1940)
- Patrick Finbar Ryan, O.P., Archbishop of Port of Spain (1940–1966), provincial of the Irish Dominican Province (1921–26 and 1930–34)
- William Dominic O'Carroll, O.P., (1874-1880), Coadjutor bishop
- Thomas Raymond Hyland, O.P., (1882-1884), Coadjutor bishop
- George Vincent King, O.P., 1885–1886), Coadjutor bishop
- William Michael Fitzgerald, O.P., (1958-1968), Auxiliary bishop

=== Irish Dominicans killed/martyred ===
- Richard Barry, O.P., Prior of Cashel, slain there, 1647.
- Dominic Dillon, O.P., prior at Urlar (Mayo), martyred, drogheda 1649
- Raymund Keogh, O.P., Roscommon Priory, martyred Mullingar, 1642.
- William Lynch, O.P., hanged, 1649.
- Miler MacGrath (Father Michael of the Rosary), O.P., hanged, Clonmel, 1650.
- William McGillacunny (MacGiolla Coinigh), O.P., executed at Coleraine, 1617.
- Thaddeaus Moriarity, O.P., DTh., Prior of Tralee, hanged, at Killarney, 1653.
- Edmund O'Bern, O.P., beheaded after torture, Jamestown, Carrick-on-Shannon, 1652.
- Terence Albert O'Brien, (1600 - 31 October 1651), Bishop of Emly, martyr, hanged in Limerick.
- Felix O'Connor, O.P., Prior at Louvain and Sligo; died in Sligo Jail, 1679.
- William O'Connor, O.P., Clonmel Priory, slain, 1651.
- Thomas O'Higgins, O.P., hanged in Clonmel, 1651.
- Peter O'Higgins, O.P., Prior of Naas, hanged, 1641.
- John O'Luin, O.P., hanged at Derry 1607.
- Donagh (William) O'Luin, O.P., prior of Derry, hanged and quartered, 1608.
- Raymund O'Moore, O.P., Martyred, Dublin 1665.
- Richard Oveton, O.P., sub-prior at Athy, beheaded in Drogheda, 1649
- James O'Reilly, O.P., killed near Clonmel, 1649

== Provincial of the Dominicans in Ireland ==
- 2021–Present: John Harris O.P.
- 2012-2020: Gregory Carroll O.P.
- 2004-2012: Pat Lucey, O.P.
- 2000-2004: Gearóid Manning O.P.
- 1992-2000: Larry Collins O.P.
- 1984-1992: Tom Jordan O.P.
- 1969-?: Flannan Aidan Hynes O.P.
- Louis Coffey O.P.
- 1957-1961: Reginald Harrington O.P.
- Thomas E. Garde O.P.
- 1930-1934: Patrick Finbar Ryan O.P.
- 1921-1926: Patrick Finbar Ryan O.P.
- 1868-1872: Robert Augustine Concanen White O.P.
- 1864-1868: Bartholomew Thomas Russell O.P.
- 1856-1860: Robert Augustine Concanen White O.P.
- 1852-1856: Bartholomew Thomas Russell O.P.
- Bernard Dominic Goodman O.P.
- 1836-1840: William Joseph McDonnell O.P.
- 1832-1836: Peter Dominick Smyth O.P.
- 1828-1832: Andrew Fitzgerald O.P.
- Patrick Gibbins O.P.
- 1738-1740: John Fottrell O.P.
- 1734-1738: Bernard McNally O.P.
- 1731-1734: John O'Brien O.P., prior of youghal
- 1726-1730: Colman O'Shaughnessy O.P., became Bishop of Ossory
- 1721-1726: Stephen (MacEgan) Eagan O.P., became Bishop of Clonmacnoise and in 1729 Bishop of Meath
- Hugh O'Calanan O.P.
- 1700-1709: Ambrose O'Conor O.P., MTh
- 1647: Terence Albert O'Brien O.P.
- 1627-1632: Nicholas Lynch O.P., tenure extended to 1632 by the pope, became Prior in San Sisto Vecchio, Rome.
- 1614-1617: Roche MacGeoghegan O.P.
- 1593-1600: Thaddeus Duane O.P.

== Dominican publications ==
Established in 1897, Dominican publications have published Catholic ethos books and a number of magazines and journals.

=== Journals ===
- Doctrine and Life- Religious Life Review (ten times a year)
- Scripture in Church (quarterly)
- Spirituality (every two months)

=== Former journals ===
- Irish Rosary, monthly journal (1897-1961)
- Imeldist, children's publication founded in 1921 published until 1941

== See also ==
Category:

- Dominican monasteries in the Republic of Ireland

Pages:

- List of abbeys and priories in Ireland
- List of abbeys and priories in Northern Ireland
- List of Catholic religious institutes
- Roman Catholicism in Ireland
