= A Jew in the Roman Bathhouse =

2023 book by Yaron Z. Eliav

A Jew in the Roman Bathhouse: Cultural Interaction in the Ancient Mediterranean
- cover
- Author: Yaron Z. Eliav
- Language: English
- Subject: The Jewish cultural interaction with Graeco-Roman society, the Jewish life in the Roman Empire, Roman bathhouses and Jewish adaptation, Religious and cultural exchange in antiquity, Jewish participation in Roman public spaces
- Genre: Non-fiction
- Publisher: Princeton University Press
- Publication date: May 16, 2023
- Pages: 392
- ISBN: 9780691243436

A Jew in the Roman Bathhouse: Cultural Interaction in the Ancient Mediterranean is a 2023 book by American scholar of Judaic Studies and ancient history Yaron Z. Eliav. Eliav investigates how Jews in antiquity engaged with the Roman public bathhouse. Rather than avoiding these spaces, as previously assumed, the author argues that Jews actively participated in Roman bathing culture while navigating its religious and cultural challenges. The book introduces the concept of "filtered absorption", a model that explains how Jews selectively adopted aspects of Graeco-Roman society while integrating them into their own religious and cultural framework.

== Summary ==
The book is a scholarly investigation of how Jewish communities in Roman-ruled territories engaged with the institution of the public bathhouse. Written by Yaron Z. Eliav and published by Princeton University Press in 2023, the book analyzes a wide range of evidence—literary, archaeological, and historical—to explore how Jews participated in, adapted to, and occasionally resisted this essential element of Roman civic life.

In the Introduction, Eliav lays out the rationale behind focusing on bathhouses, arguing that they encapsulate multiple facets of Roman society—from engineering achievements and social hierarchy to notions of hygiene and leisure—and thereby serve as a window into broader cultural interaction between Jews and Romans. Part I, "Setting the Stage," comprises three chapters. Chapter 1, "The Miracle of (Hot) Water," details the rise of Roman public bathhouses as prominent cultural institutions. Chapter 2, "A Literary Bathhouse," shows how ancient sources—Jewish and non-Jewish—portray bathing facilities, underscoring perceptions and realities of their daily use. Chapter 3, "Earliest Encounters," surveys archaeological discoveries alongside evolving scholarly interpretations to trace how Jewish communities first came into contact with Roman bathing culture.

Part II, "Filtered Absorption," explores the nuanced ways in which Jews integrated or modified Roman practices to fit their own traditions. Chapter 4, "A Sinful Place?", reviews rabbinic legal texts (halakhah) and varying rabbinic views on the permissibility of frequenting such communal, and often overtly pagan, venues. Chapter 5, "Tsni‘ut (Rabbinic Modes of Modesty) in the Halls of Promiscuity," discusses rabbinic guidelines on nakedness and mixed bathing, illustrating the cultural negotiations taking place. Chapter 6, "The Naked Rabbi and the Beautiful Goddess," addresses the presence of statuary in bathhouses—particularly depictions of deities—and how Jewish authorities and individuals responded to visual representations of polytheistic culture.

Part III, "Social and Cultural Textures," widens the lens to consider social status, daily interactions, and the perceived dangers associated with the bathhouse environment. Chapter 7, "A Social Laboratory," investigates how rank and hierarchy played out among bathhouse users, while Chapter 8, "A Scary Place," looks at the superstitions and possible magical remedies Jews employed in situations where bathing was believed to invite physical or spiritual harm. The book concludes with "In Conclusion," where Eliav reflects on the broader significance of these findings for the study of ancient Mediterranean culture, followed by notes, a bibliography of primary and secondary works, and indexes of both ancient citations and general topics. Eliav maintains a close reading of rabbinic literature in dialogue with the archaeological record. He aimes to reveal how Jews in Roman territories navigated communal life in a society where the public bathhouse was a central institution.

The book contains three maps, one diagram, and twenty six figures. The maps show each site mentioned in the book and allows for easy navigating of the ancient world. The diagram depicts a full Roman bath and is also accessible through the website of Princeton University Press.

== Reviews ==
Eleanor Martin described the book as "a rich, well argued, and thought-provoking study". Martin thought that the book stands out for examining a single group (the Jews of Judaea/Syria Palaestina) and a single cultural institution (the Roman public bathhouse). This concentrated approach impressed the reviewer because it demonstrated a targeted way to test the concept of "filtered absorption". Martin considered the integration of rabbinic literature—often underutilized by classicists—with the more familiar Greco-Roman textual, visual, and archaeological evidence as a major strength for the book. While she commended Eliav's dismantling of earlier, overly simplistic views on Jewish hostility toward public bathing, she also observed that Part III feels slightly disjointed and that greater chronological contextualization could bolster the overall argument. Martin appreciated Eliav's new term "filtered absorption" for offering a nuanced alternative to the common binary of conflict or influence in Roman–minority studies, while recognizing that such an idea builds on earlier scholarship.

In his review, Dennis Mizzi, from the University of Malta, called Eliav's book "immensely rich and multi-layered." He praised its interdisciplinary approach and noted how the author integrated rabbinic sources with Greco-Roman evidence. He said the work showed how Jews in ancient Palestine adopted Roman bathhouse culture through "filtered absorption". He commended Eliav's success at breaking disciplinary boundaries, though he thought that the archaeological discussion is underdeveloped. Mizzi argued that limited evidence did not prove widespread early bathhouse adoption and wished for closer engagement with debates on Hellenization and Romanization. He questioned how "filtered absorption" differed from existing models, yet he concluded that the work enhanced the understanding of Jewish attitudes toward a Roman institution.

Michael Taylor called Eliav's book a compelling study. Taylor showed how Jews embraced Roman bathing culture but managed to navigate nudity, impurity, and idolatry. Rabbinic texts refuted the older assumption that Jews shunned these spaces entirely. Taylor praised the concept of "filtered absorption", which explained how Jews adopted Roman customs without losing their identity.

Sara Jo Ben Zvi highlighted how Eliav's study challenged assumptions about Jews avoiding Roman baths. She noted that the Talmudic sources showed rabbis enjoyed these facilities. She emphasized how Eliav used archaeological findings in Roman Judea to reinforce this conclusion. Ben Zvi praised the author's focus on engineering details that made such bathhouses possible. She observed that the rabbis navigated nudity, possible shaming, and ritual questions without forbidding these baths. She cited Eliav's notion of "filtered absorption," showing how Jews adopted Roman customs while modifying them. She concluded that the book offers a fresh view of ancient Judaism's interaction with Roman culture.

Jason Maston saw Eliav's work as a response to older views that Jews avoided Roman bathhouses. He noted that Eliav showed how rabbis actually frequented these spaces. He praised the detailed use of many texts demonstrating Jewish familiarity with bathhouse activities. He highlighted how Eliav addressed nudity, idolatry, social hierarchy, and magic in different chapters. He appreciated Eliav's concept of "filtered absorption". He concluded that scholars would find the book fascinating.

Irish theologian, Thomas O'Loughlin, said Eliav "displays a rare combination of skills", as he brings his cross-discipline expertise in rabbinic legal studies and religious history, to study "the culture of the bathhouse." O'Loughlin found the book well illustrated, showing the geographical locations of baths in the province of Syria. The reviewer said the book challenged the assumption that segregation from the larger society was a crucial part of how Judaism and Christianity came to define themselves. O'Loughlin said the book will be an uncomfortable read for "warriors in contemporary culture wars."

Simon Goldhill judged the book as a rich and detailed examination of Jewish identity within the multicultural environment of the Roman Empire. Goldhill observed how the author drew on an extensive range of sources – from Josephus and Philo to rabbinical texts – to illuminate the complexities of Jewish participation in Hellenistic culture. The reviewer admired the way the book challenged simplistic or purely self-serving historical claims. The author emphasized instead the nuanced nature of cultural interaction. Goldhill also remarked on how Eliav situated these interactions against broader debates about identity and multiculturalism in both ancient and modern contexts.
