= Patrick Finbar Ryan =

Catholic Bishop in Spain

Patrick Finbar Ryan TC O.P.
- Archbishop of Port of Spain
- Church: Catholic Church
- Archdiocese: Archdiocese of Port of Spain
- In office: 6 June 1940 – 24 May 1966
- Predecessor: John Pius Dowling
- Successor: Gordon Anthony Pantin
- Other post: Titular Archbishop of Villamagna in Tripolitania (1966-1975)
- Previous posts: Titular Bishop of Gabula (1937-1940); Coadjutor Archbishop of Port of Spain (1937-1940)

Orders
- Ordination: 8 April 1905
- Consecration: 29 June 1937 by Paschal Charles David Robinson

Personal details
- Born: 4 March 1881 Cork, County Cork, United Kingdom of Great Britain and Ireland
- Died: 10 January 1975 (aged 93) Cork, County Cork, Republic of Ireland

Patrick Finbar Ryan, TC, O.P., (4 March 1881 – 10 January 1975) was an Irish Dominican priest who served as Archbishop of Port of Spain, Trinidad (1940–1966).

On 4 March 1881, Patrick Ryan was born in Rochestown, County Cork to Edward Ryan and Matilda Ryan. He was initially educated at Christian Brothers College, Cork, and Clongowes Wood College. He then entered St. Mary's Priory, Tallaght to become a Dominican. At St. Mary's, he also studied at University College Dublin, Royal University of Ireland, and subsequently moved to study at Sapienza University of Rome. He was ordained a priest of the Dominicans Order at the Irish Dominican run, Basilica of San Clemente, Rome, in 1905.

He taught at the Dominican secondary school Newbridge College in County Kildare, serving as Dean. In 1915, he became Prior at St. Saviour's Church, Dominick St., Dublin, until 1919, when he moved to Cork (city) as Prior of St. Mary's Church, Pope's Quay. He edited the Dominican publication the Irish Rosary and, in 1921, founded a children's religious magazine, the Imeldist. He served as Provincial of the Dominicans in Ireland twice - from 1921 to 1926 and, again, from 1930 to 1934.

He was appointed co-adjudicator bishop of Port of Spain, Trinidad in 1937, before being elevated to Archbishop in 1940. In 1943, he established the Seminary of St. John Vianney and the Uganda Martyrs in Tunapuna, Trinidad. In 1946, he invited the Irish Presentation Brothers and, in 1947, the Holy Faith Sisters to set up schools in the diocese.

He attended the Second Vatican Council, 1962-1965.

He retired in 1966 and was concurrently appointed Titular Archbishop of Villamagna in Tripolitana. He moved back to Ireland. He died on 10 January 1975, in Cork.

== Awards ==
In 1937, Fr Ryan was awarded the Freedom of Cork City.

In 1950, he was honoured with a knighthood by the Vatican as a Grand Officer of the Supreme Order of Christ becoming a papal count, also in 1969 he was awarded the Trinity Cross by the government of Trinidad and Tobago.

== Relatives ==
Bishop Ryan's brother was a British diplomat Sir Andrew Ryan, KBE, CMG, whose son was the theologian and like his uncle a Dominican, Rev. Dr. Columba Ryan OP, Another brother, Thomas, served in the Indian civil service and his sister Mary Ryan MA was Professor of Romance Languages at University College Cork, the first female professor in Ireland or the UK.
