= Thomas Nicholas Burke =

Irish Dominican preacher

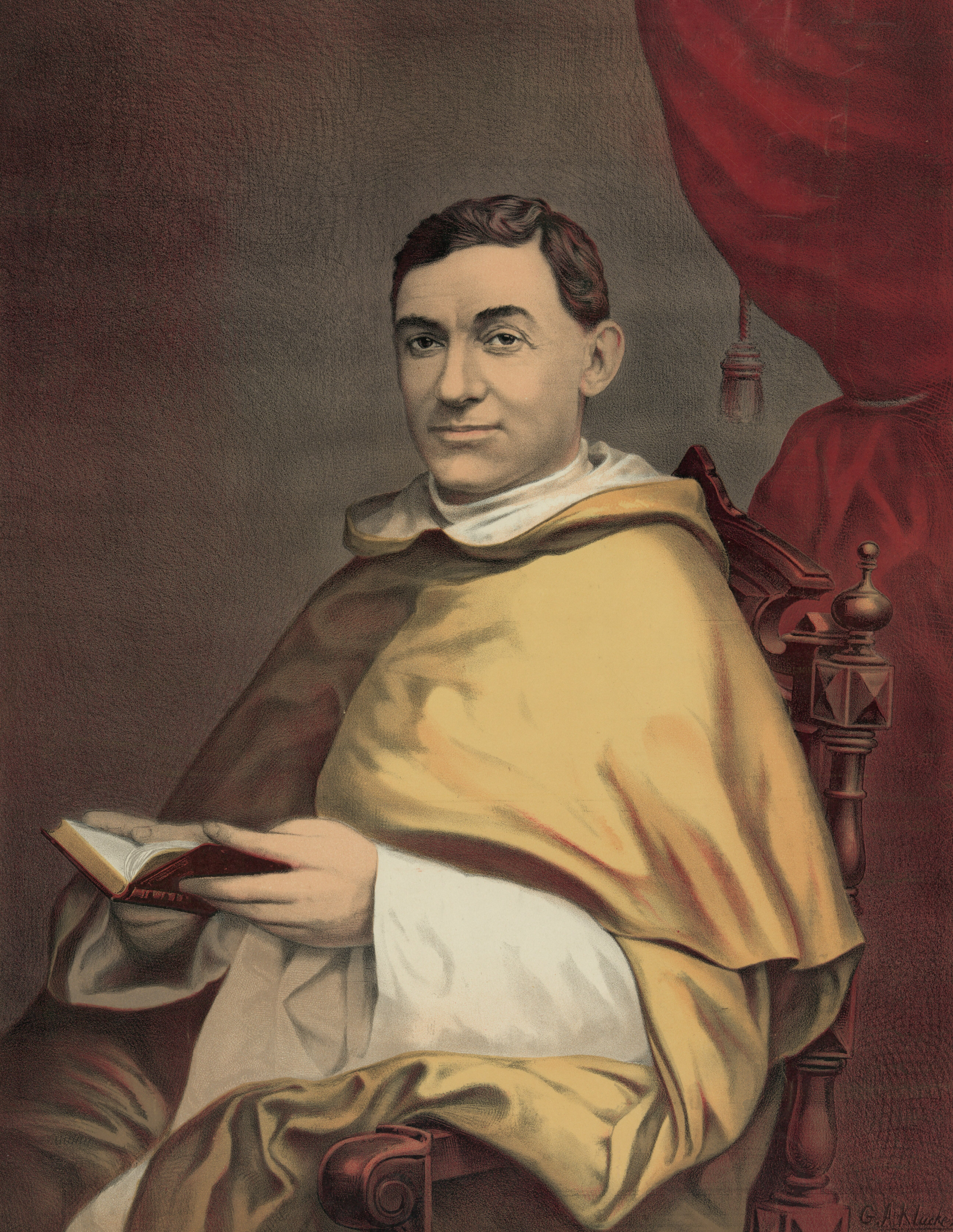
Portrait of Rev. T. N. Burke, OP

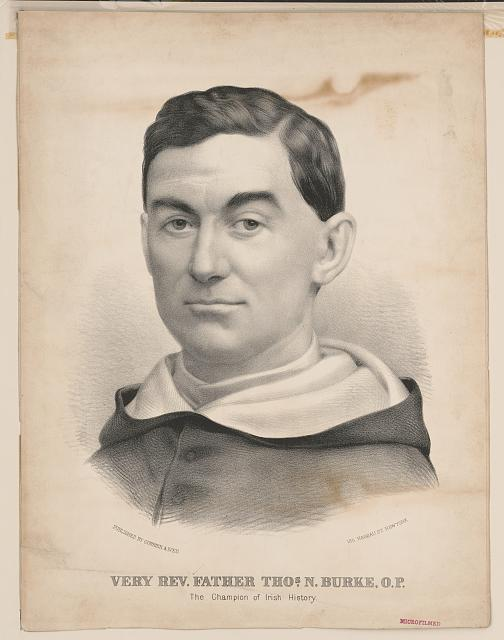
Thomas Nicholas Burke at age 26 -Currier and Ives portrait 1856

Thomas Nicholas Burke (8 September 1830 in Galway – 2 July 1883 in Tallaght, Ireland) was an Irish Dominican preacher.

== Life ==
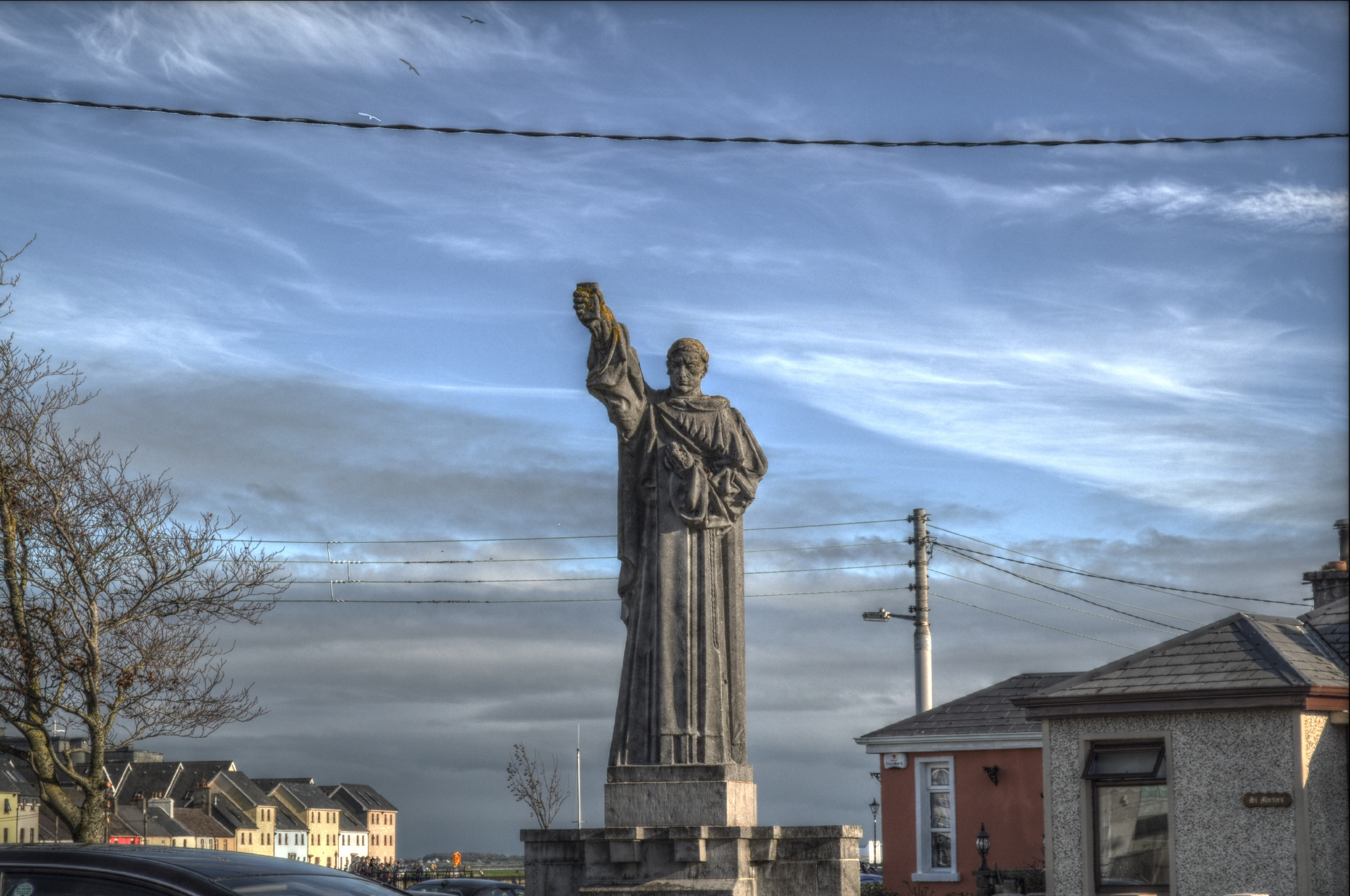
Father Burke's statue, Galway, by John F Kavanagh

His parents, though in moderate circumstances, gave him a good education. He studied at first under the care of the Patrician Brothers, and was afterwards sent to a private school. An attack of typhoid fever when he was fourteen years old, and the famine year of 1847 had a sobering effect. Toward the end of that year he asked to be received into the Order of Preachers, and was sent to Perugia in Italy, to make his novitiate. On 29 December, he was clothed there in the habit of St. Dominic and received the name of Thomas.

Shortly afterward he was sent to Rome to begin his studies College of St. Thomas in Rome, the future Pontifical University of Saint Thomas Aquinas, Angelicum. Burke was a student of philosophy and theology at the College of St. Thomas in 1848. He passed thence to the Roman convent of Santa Sabina. His superiors sent him, while yet a student, as novice-master to Woodchester, the novitiate of the resuscitated English Province. He was ordained priest on 26 March 1853. On 3 August 1854, defended publicly the theses in universâ theologiâ. Burke was made lector at the College of St. Thomas in 1854.

Early in the following year Father Burke was recalled to Ireland to found the novitiate of the Irish Province at Tallaght, near Dublin (St. Mary's Priory). In 1859 he preached his first notable sermon on "Church Music"; it immediately lifted him into fame.

Elected Prior of Tallaght in 1863, he went to Rome the following year as Rector of the Dominican Convent of San Clemente, and attracted great attention by his preaching. He returned to Ireland in 1867, and delivered his oration on Daniel O'Connell at Glasnevin before fifty thousand people. In Dublin he was assigned to St Saviour's Priory.

John Pius Leahy, Bishop of Dromore, took him as his theologian to the First Vatican Council in 1870, and the following year he was sent as Visitor to the Dominican convents in America. He was besieged with invitations to preach and lecture. The seats were filled hours before he appeared, and his audiences overflowed the churches and halls in which he lectured. In New York, he delivered the discourses in refutation of the English historian James Froude.

In eighteen months he gave four hundred lectures, exclusive of sermons, the proceeds amounting to nearly $400,000. His mission was a triumph, but the triumph was dearly won, and when he arrived in Ireland on 7 March 1873, he was spent and broken.

During the next decade he preached in Ireland, England, and Scotland. He began the erection of the church in Tallaght in 1883, and the following May preached a series of sermons in the new Dominican church, London. In June he returned to Tallaght in a dying condition, and preached his last sermon in the Jesuit church, Dublin, in aid of the starving children of Donegal. A few days afterward he died.

He is buried in the church of Tallaght, now a memorial to him. There is a statue of Thomas Burke by John Francis Kavanagh at Claddagh Quay in Galway.

== Works ==
Many of his lectures and sermons were collected and published in various editions in New York, as were also the four lectures in reply to Froude (1872) the latter with the title "The Case of Ireland Stated".

- The Sermons, Lectures, and Addresses (1872)
- English Misrule in Ireland (1873)
- Ireland's Case Stated: In Reply to Mr. Froude (1873)

== See also ==
- Dominicans in Ireland

== Notes ==
Attribution

- ; The entry cites:
  - FitzPatrick, Life of Fr. Tom Burke (London, 1885);
  - Inner Life of Fr. Burke, by a Friar Preacher, and Father Burke, in the Publications of the English and Irish Catholic Truth Societies.
