= St Saviour's Priory, Dublin =

Irish church

Coordinates: 53.3532°N 6.2673°W

St. Saviour's Priory
- St. Saviour's Dominican Church
- Séipéal an t-Slánaitheora Ró-Naofa
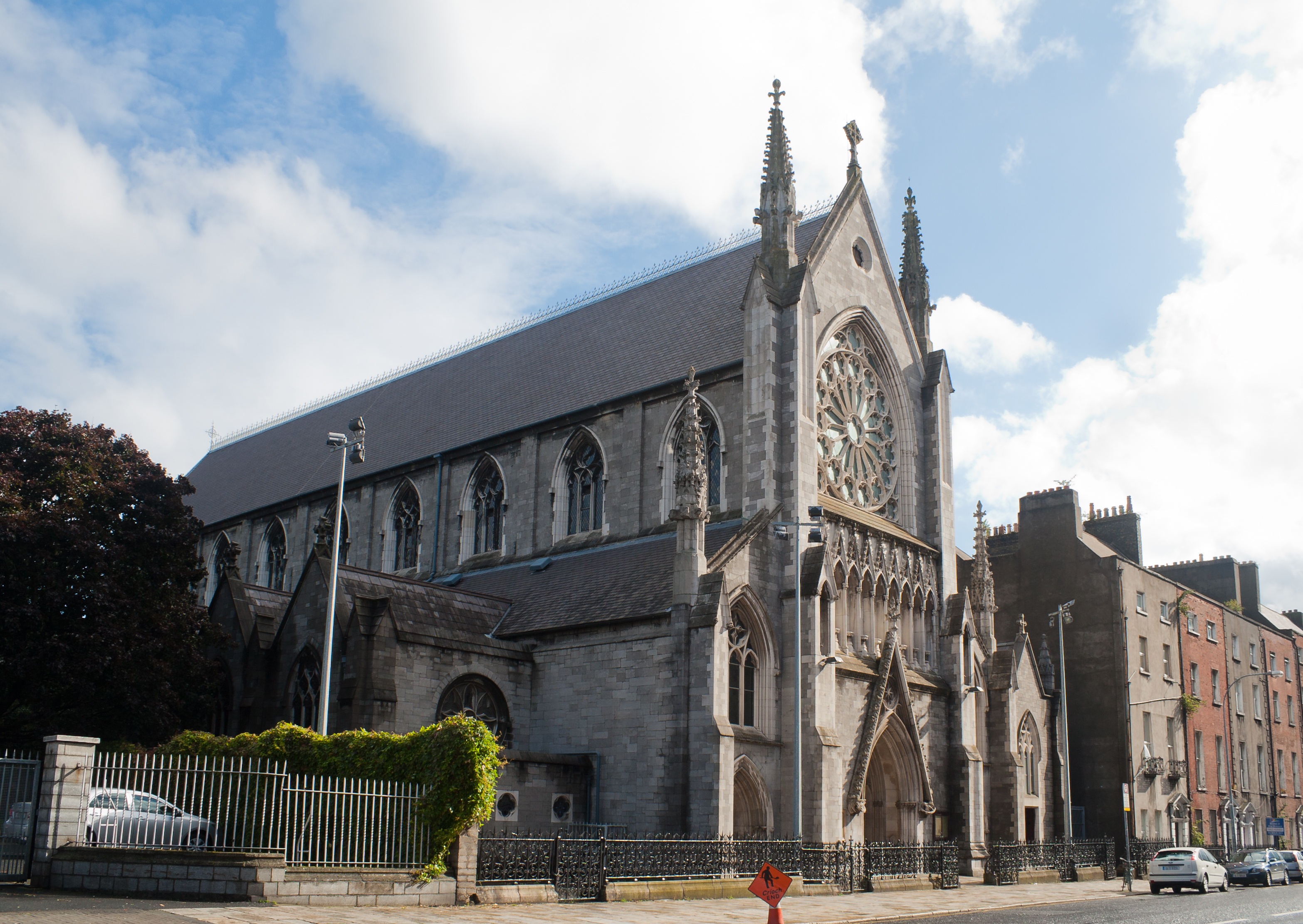

- Location within Central Dublin
- Location: 3-11 Upper Dorset Street, Rotunda, Dublin 1
- Country: Ireland
- Language: English
- Denomination: Roman Catholic
- Tradition: Roman Rite
- Religious order: Dominicans
- Website: saintsavioursdublin.ie

History
- Consecrated: 1861

Architecture
- Architect: J.J. McCarthy
- Architectural type: Church
- Style: Gothic
- Groundbreaking: 1853

Specifications
- Materials: Limestone exterior, with Portland stone dressing

Administration
- Province: Irish Dominicans
- Archdiocese: Dublin
- Parish: St. Saviour's Parish

St. Saviour's Priory, Dublin, is a convent of the Dominican Order, in Dublin, founded in 1224. Its present church has, since 1974, also served as a parish church for the local area, The priory has also been, since 2000, the House of Formation of the Irish Dominican Province, hosting the so-called Studium generale of the province.

== History ==
Following the arrival of the Dominicans in Ireland in 1224, they established the Friary of the Most Holy Saviour, on the North banks of the River Liffey, where the Four Courts is located today, south of which was the halls of study on what is ushers island, a stone bridge was built by the order, to connect the convent with the college. The church built in 1238, had to be rebuilt following a fire in 1304. The friary was suppressed by Henry VIII following the dissolution of the monasteries in 1539, and it was where the King's Inns was established in 1541 before becoming the Four Courts in the 18th century.

The priory was later located on Cook Street until around 1698 and then in Bridge Street before moving to a dedicated building on Little Denmark Street around 1780.

=== Saint Saviour's, Little Denmark Street ===
A church was originally built on Little Denmark Street around 1770. The street had been renamed from Liffey Street in 1773. The new building was later classically remodelled around 1835 and turned into a school and orphanage following the construction of the new priory in the 1860s. The orphanage had moved from nearby number 44 Jervis Street which was also used by the Dominicans and had been donated by Reverend John P Prendergast in return for use of the buildings on Little Denmark Street.

The schools were further renovated and enlarged in 1909.

The building was demolished around 1960 and the street was later totally erased to be replaced by the Ilac Centre around 1980.

=== St. Saviour's, Dominick Street ===
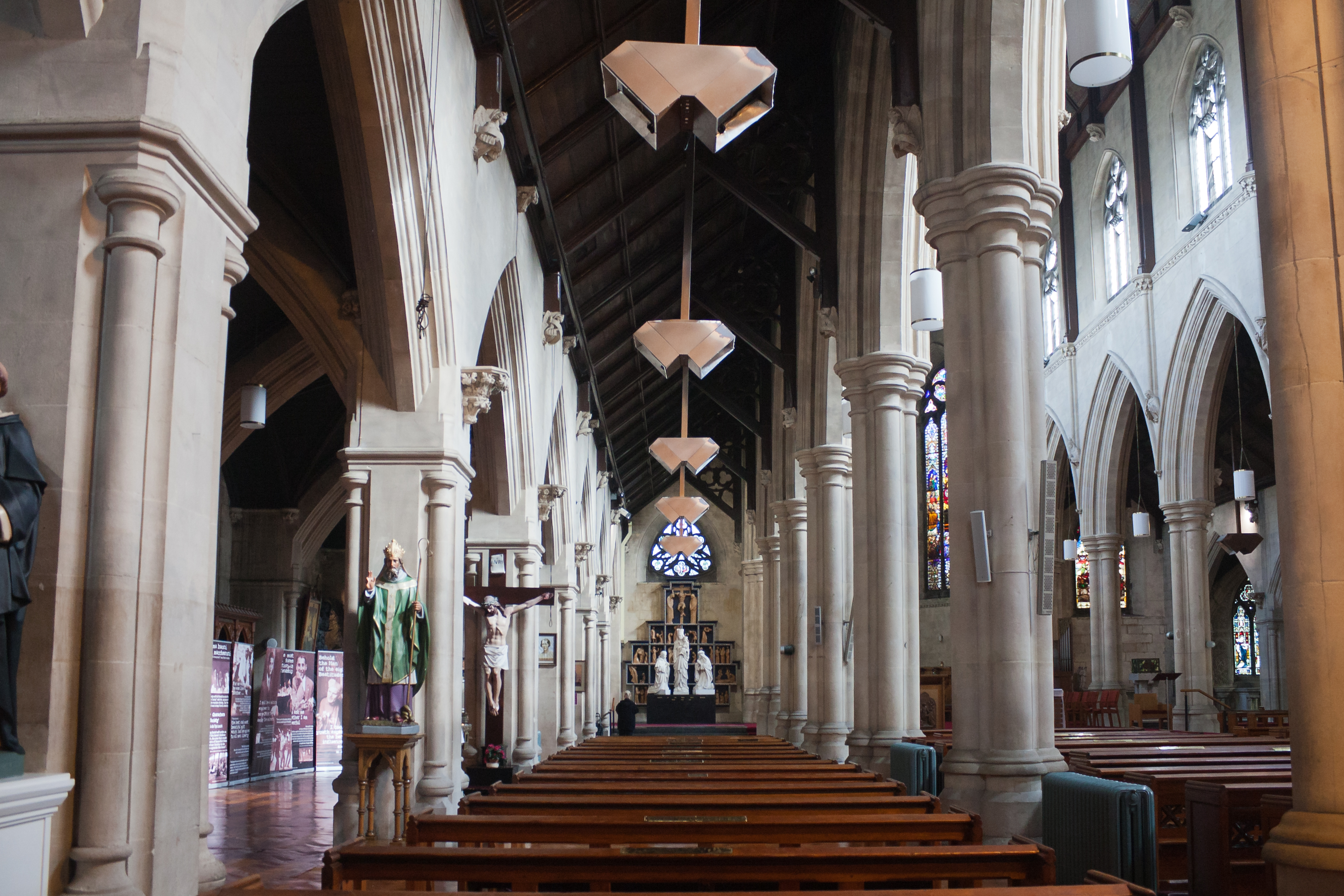
View of interior

The gothic-styled church of St. Saviour's in Dominick Street was built by Irish church architect, J.J. McCarthy, building commenced in 1853 and the church was dedicated according to a simple rite on Tuesday, the 17th of January 1861 and opened in 1862. The priory was extended and built between 1874 and 1877. The church has never been solemnly dedicated, i.e. never consecrated. The exterior is Limestone with Portland stone dressing and the interior uses Bath stone.

St. Saviour's Convent/Priory was built in 1885 by the architect John Loftus Robinson, supposedly with funds intended to add a spire to the church, the house in which the writer and MP Richard Brinsley Sheridan was born was among the houses on Dorset Street, demolished to make way for the construction. Originally designed by Robinson as a quadrangle, only three sides were completed.

The Church organ was built in 1897 by Telford & Telford (the leading Irish organ builders of the nineteenth and earlier twentieth centuries).

The church was made the parish church for the area in 1974, and it offers masses in Polish (it is the location of the Dominican Polish Chaplaincy since 2006 when two polish priests were sent to St. Saviours) and Spanish, as their communities have increased in Dublin.

St. Martin's Chapel on Parnell Square, is also used by the friars, where they say mass, the director of St. Martins Apostolate has always lived in St. Saviour's Priory, and it is also where their Dominican Publishing company is based, through which St. Saviour's publishes Doctrine and Life, and in the past published the Irish Rosary (1897–1961) and the Imeldist (1921–1941).

St. Catherine's Chapel, in the priory, on Dorset Street, in recent years has been developed for conferences and is used by the Studium.

In October 2019 as part of the youth ministry a Sunday Catechesis Programme, commenced at St. Saviour's with the programme being conducted by parents and friars for the children, it was suspended during the COVID-19 pandemic.

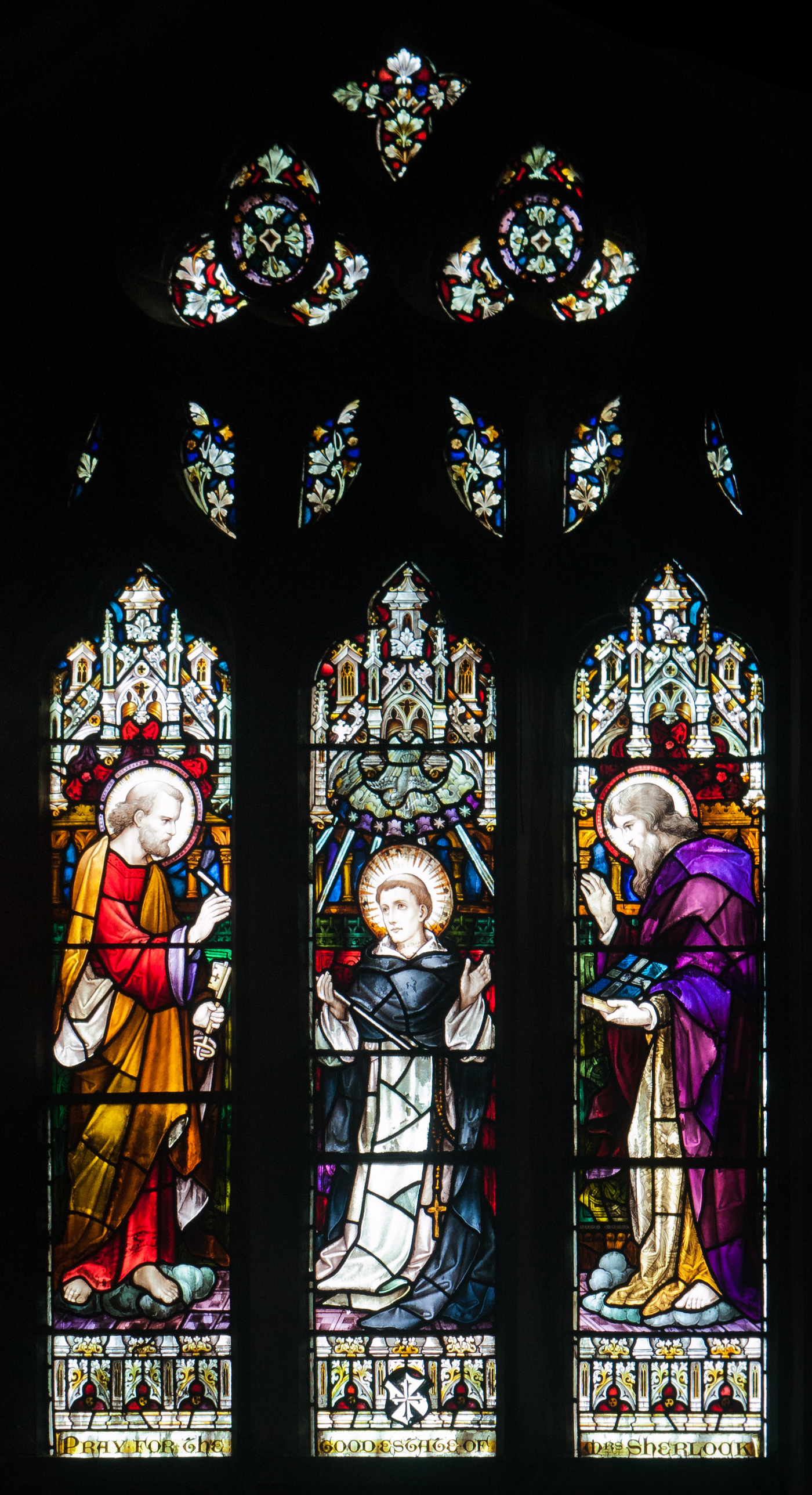
Stained glass window with Saint Peter, Saint Dominic and Saint Paul

Within the Parish, in 1964, St. Saviour's Boxing Club was set up directly across Dorset St. from the Priory, in the old Dorset Street Fire Station (which was designed by C.J. Mc Carthy the only son of J.J. McCarthy who designed the Church) also St. Dominic's Youth Club was set up off Western Way, which is now a Romanian Orthodox church. Now defunct there was St. Saviour's football team, based around Dominick Street, the crest contained St. Saviour's church and priory, and their biggest success was winning the FAI Junior Cup in 1959.

== Dominican House of Studies - Studium ==
In 2000, the Irish Dominicans moved their House of Studies (Studium), which had been since its establishment in 1855 at St. Mary's Priory in Tallaght, to St. Saviours. St. Mary's Priory Church, Pope's Quay in Cork is the Novitiate for the Dominican Province of Ireland where the first year of formation/training as a Dominican friar takes place. Since 1971, the Irish Dominican Studium is affiliated to the Dominican Pontifical University of Saint Thomas Aquinas (Angelicum University) in Rome, which grants to successful students (the Bachelor of Sacred Theology (STB) degree). Since the early 1980s, the friars have studied philosophy in different third-level institutes in the Dublin area – the Milltown Institute, UCD, NUIM – for two or three years. Since the student brothers take the STB degree over four years rather than the prescribed three, those who take a full BA programme are ordained early and often complete the fourth year of theology in Rome, living at the Irish Dominican convent of Saints Xystus and Clement which owns the world-famous basilica San Clemente, Rome.

St. Saviour's House of Studies hosts the Saint Saviour's Symposium (a lecture series held most months throughout the year), and other talks and conferences on religious topics.

== People associated with St. Saviour's ==
- Austin Flannery OP, edited the Dominican publication, produced by St. Saviour's and prior, 1957–1960.
- Bishop Patrick Finbar Ryan OP, served as Prior from 1915 to 1919.
- Fergal O'Connor OP, philosopher, lecturer, and social justice activist, in 1971 he set up Ally to support unmarried mothers, and Sherrard House for homeless girls, based at St. Saviours from 1961 until his death in 2005.
- Pius M. Cleary, OP, prior
- Gregory Carroll OP. prior and parish priest, appointed provincial in 2012 serving until 2020
- Eddie Conway OP, prior St. Saviour's, 2012–2018.
- Pius McArdle OP, Brother and sacristan and in charge of altar boys for many years
- Eustace Murphy OP, Prior

== Other Irish Dominican Priories and Houses of Formation ==
- St. Mary's Priory Church, Pope's Quay in Cork is the orders Novitiate
- St. Mary's Priory, Tallaght, established in 1855, became Studium in 1935 until 2000, now houses The Priory Institute
- San Clemente, Rome, administered by the Irish Dominicans.
- Esker Friary, was the Dominican Novitiate from 1857 until it closed in 1889.
