= Austin Flannery =

Austin Flannery, OP (born Liam; 10 January 1925 – 21 October 2008) was an Irish Dominican priest, writer and social justice campaigner.

== Biography ==
Born at Rearcross in County Tipperary on 10 January 1925, he was the eldest of seven children of William K. Flannery and his wife Margaret (née Butler). He was educated at St. Flannan's College in Ennis, completing his secondary education at Dominican College, Newbridge, County Kildare.

He joined the Dominican Order in September 1944, which led to studies in theology at St Mary's Priory, Tallaght, and then at Blackfriars, Oxford. Joining the Dominicans, he chose the religious name Austin and was ordained a priest in 1950. He continued his studies at the Angelicum in Rome. After his studies, he taught Latin in Newbridge College and then theology at Glenstal Abbey, County Limerick.

Flannery edited the Dominican bi-monthly journal Doctrine and Life from 1958 to 1988, while at St. Saviour’s Priory, Dublin, where he also served as prior from 1957 to 1960. He also edited the Religious Life Review. During and after the Second Vatican Council, he made available in English all the documents from the event, translated with modern and inclusive language.

Flannery's campaigning to end apartheid in South Africa led to involvement with Kader Asmal and the founding the Irish Anti-Apartheid Movement, of which Asmal served as chairman and president. In the late 1960s, Flannary's campaigning on behalf of the Dublin Housing Action Committee, due to its association with republicans and left-wing activists, led him to being accused of being a communist. He was derided in the Dáil by the then Minister for Finance, Charles Haughey, as "a gullible cleric".

Flannery died of a heart attack at age 83 on 21 October 2008, and is buried in the Dominican plot at Glasnevin Cemetery.
