= Myles Lee =

Irish businessman (born 1953)

- Born: Myles Peter Lee; 1953 (age 72–73)
- Education: University College Cork
- Occupation: Businessman
- Years active: 1974-present
- Title: former CEO, CRH plc
- Term: 2009–2014
- Predecessor: Liam O'Mahony
- Successor: Albert Manifold

Myles Peter Lee (born 1953) is an Irish businessman. He was the chief executive (CEO) of CRH plc, an Irish multinational diversified building materials company, until his retirement on 1 January 2014, when he was succeeded by Albert Manifold. CRH is Ireland's largest company; its primary listing is on the London Stock Exchange and is a constituent of the FTSE 100 Index.

== Early life ==
Lee attended Newbridge College, a private secondary school in County Kildare. He has a bachelor's degree in civil engineering from University College Cork. Lee joined KPMG, qualifying as a chartered accountant in 1977, later becoming FCA (fellow chartered accountant).

== Career ==
He became chief executive of CRH in January 2009, having been finance director from November 2003. He joined CRH in 1982, having previously worked in a professional accountancy practice and in the oil industry.
