= Thomas Burke (bishop) =

Irish Dominican and Roman Catholic Bishop of Ossory

Thomas Burke (Thomas De Burgo) (c. 1709 in Dublin, Ireland – 25 September 1776 in Kilkenny) was an Irish Dominican and Roman Catholic Bishop of Ossory.

== Life ==
Burke travelled to Rome in 1723 and there was placed under the care of his namesake and kinsman, a Dominican, Father Thomas Burke, who prepared him for admission into the order. A dispensation was obtained from the Sacred Congregation, and on 14 June 1724, he was clothed with the Dominican habit before he had attained his fifteenth year.

Young Burke showed special aptitude for study and with the permission of the master general was allowed to begin his course during his novitiate. Two years were given to philosophy and five to theology. So marked was his progress in studies and letters that he was singled out, even though yet a novice, by special marks of affection from Pope Benedict XIII. During the reconstruction of St. Sixtus' in 1727 and 1728, the pontiff visited the Irish Dominicans once a week, taking part in their community exercises, becoming familiar with the friars and especially with Burke.

He was gradually promoted to the highest theological honours of the order, being charged successively with all the official duties in a regular Dominican studium. He held the office of regent of studies for six years. In 1742 the Master General, Thomas Ripoll, personally conferred on him the degree of Master of Theology.

The following year he returned to Dublin where he took up the work of the ministry. A general chapter of the order held at Bologna in 1748 passed an ordinance that in all the immediately following provincial chapters a historiographer should be appointed in every province. This order did not reach Ireland from Rome in time for the provincial chapter which was convened the following year at Dublin, and to which assembly Father Burke had been elected by his brethren as Definitor. At the subsequent chapter, however, of 1753 he was appointed historian of his province. The same honour of Definitor was conferred again in 1757.

Father Burke while in Rome was commissioned by the Irish clergy, through Bishop Michael MacDonagh OP of Kilmore, to obtain from the Holy See ten new offices of Irish saints. After his return to Ireland, he was entrusted with a similar commission by the Archbishop of Dublin, the Most Rev. John Linegar, and the Bishops of Ireland for fourteen other feasts of the Irish saints. The decrees were given respectively 8 July 1741 and 1 July 1747. Both original documents are preserved in the archives of St. Clement's, Rome.

Father Burke was promoted by Pope Clement XIII in 1759, to the See of Ossory, which he governed for seventeen years. An accurate portrait of Bishop Burke is possessed by the Dominican nuns of Drogheda, Ireland.

== Works ==
He is known to posterity more on account of his learned work Hibernia Dominicana, than by any other claim. The work was nominally published at Cologne, but in reality it came from the press of Edmund Finn of Kilkenny, in 1762. The author gave to it four years of incessant labour, and in 1772 he added a "Supplementum" which was a vindication of Rinuccini, the nuncio of Pope Innocent X, of the charges brought against him by the supreme council of Confederate Catholics during his residence in Ireland. Question of the oath of allegiance and fear of subverting "that fidelity and submission which we acknowledge ourselves to owe from duty and from gratitude to his Majesty King George III" caused seven of the Irish Bishops to condemn the "Hibernia Dominicana" and "Supplementum". (For defense of Bishop Burke see Coleman, Ir. Eccl. Record.) "Promptuarium dogmatico canonico morale", a work of the celebrated Spanish Dominican Larrago, enlarged and accommodated to its day by Father Burke, was about to be published in 1753 when his appointment as historian interrupted it.

== See also ==
- Dominicans in Ireland
