= Irish Rosary =

Defunct Irish Catholic monthly magazine

Irish Rosary ("A monthly magazine conducted by the Dominican Fathers"), was an Irish Catholic monthly magazine produced by the Irish Dominicans. The Irish Rosary was the first publication from the Dominican Publications since its foundation in April 1897, published from the Dominicans, St. Saviour's Priory, Dublin, the monthly journal continued to appear until 1961. Doctrine and Life was published as part of it from 1948 until 1951, when they were published independently.

Irish Rosary promoted Catholic writing, publishing, poetry, and stories, and ran writing competitions. The magazine's ethos and content were against Freemasonry and strongly anti-communist; the paper took the nationalist, pro-Franco side in the Spanish Civil War.

== People associated with Irish Rosary ==
Editors of the magazine have included Ambrose Coleman OP, Patrick Finbar Ryan OP, H. M. McInerney OP, Hugh Fenning OP and Henry Michael Gaffney OP. Among the other contributors both lay and clerical were Prof. William Stockley, Prof. Mary Ryan, Stephen Browne SJ, Benedict O'Sullivan OP, R. F. O'Connor, Shane Leslie, Jane Martyn, S. M. Lyne, Sister Gertrude, and novelist and poet sisters, Katharine Tynan Hickson, and Nora Tynan O'Mahony.

The Gaelic revivalist poet Elizabeth (Lizzie) Twigg, who is mentioned in James Joyce's Ulysses, made many contributions to the magazine.

== Controversies ==
The republican and socialist Peadar O'Donnell lost a libel case he took against the Irish Rosary, following articles in the magazine that claimed he was a Soviet agent.

The historian Dermot Keogh claims that, like other Catholic publications at the time, The Irish Rosary published many antisemitic articles.

== See also ==
- Dominicans in Ireland
