= College of Corpo Santo, Lisbon =

- Other names: Irish Dominican College, Lisbon
- Type: Seminary
- Active: 1634–1850
- Founders: Daniel O'Daly
- Religious affiliation: Irish Dominicans

College of Corpo Santo, Lisbon was an Irish Dominican College in Lisbon, founded in 1634 by Daniel O'Daly, who was its first rector.

== History ==
The College of Corpo Santo at Cais do Sodré was built in 1659 for the Irish Dominicans, supported by King Philip of Spain (who was also King of Portugal at the time). Since so many ordained priests who returned to Ireland were killed during the Penal Laws the seminary was called the Martyr's Seminary. The college was greatly damaged in the Great Lisbon Earthquake of 1755, and it was not re-built until 1771. It ceased as a seminary after 1850, with the Irish Dominicans in San Clemente al Laterano, Rome available to train candidates for the order, and with the last significant Penal Laws removed in 1829, much of the property was sold to fund the establishment of St. Mary's Priory, Tallaght, Dublin.

The church was called the Igreja do Corpo Santo, Cais do Sodré, Lisbon. It was rebuilt in the 1770s following the earthquake, and sold in the 19th century. In 1990 it was transferred to the Porguguese Dominican Order. Today, it still stands, and contains the symbols of the Irish Dominicans on its facade.

Corpo Santo Altar Wine was a wine made under the supervision of the Irish Dominicans in Lisbon, at their vineyards, Lumiar, Lisbon, which conformed to the canonical laws, and was exported to Ireland as altar wine.

At the Convent of Our Lady of Bom Successo, the Dominican convent community remained open until recently. Established in 1639 by Daniel O'Daly, rector of Corpo Santo, and Maria Magdalena de Silva Meneses of the House of the Marquis de Marialva. The Irish Dominican sisters left Lisbon in 2016 and the last Irish Dominican priests left in 2021. On July 11, 2022, there was a seminar hosted by the Irish Embassy in Portugal in the College of Bom Successo, marking the departure.

Other rectors of the Dominican college include Bernard Russell, Laurence Barry, Raymond Butler, William Grace, John O'Brien, and Luke Hackett. Raymond M. Dowdall moved from Irish Dominican College in Rome to serve the Irish Dominican Community in Corpo Santo, in 1950. Among those buried in Corpo Santo are Daniel O'Daly the founding rector and Michael MacDonagh, Bishop of Kilmore.

== Dominican clergy educated in and associated with Lisbon ==
- Vincent Dillon, martyr, vicar of the Irish Dominican convent in Lisbon
- Edmund Ffrench, Bishop of Kilmacduagh and Kilfenora, educated at the Dominican College of Corpo Santo, Lisbon
- Michael Peter MacMahon, Bishop of Killaloe, educated at the Dominican College of Corpo Santo, Lisbon
- William Dominic O'Carroll, Coadjutor Bishop of Port of Spain (1874-1880)
- Thaddeus Moriarty (Tadhg Ó Muircheartaigh), prior of Tralee, martyred in Kilarney.
- Hugh Moriarty, served as rector of Corpo Santo
- Robert Spence, Archbishop of Adelaide, studied at Corpo Santo, first mass said at Bom Sucesso
- William Harold Vincent, educated in Corpo Santo, professor and briefly rector 1821
- John Pius Leahy, Bishop of Dromore after spending 30 years in Lisbon, rising to be Professor of Philosophy, Theology and Ecclesiastical History
- Michael MacDonagh, Bishop of Kilmore, is buried in the Irish Dominican Church, Lisbon.

== See also ==
- Irish College at Lisbon
- San Clemente al Laterano, Rome (Irish Dominicans)
- Irish College at Salamanca
