= Wilfrid Harrington =

Irish Dominican priest (1927–2025)

Wilfrid John Harrington (1927 — April 16, 2025) was an Irish Dominican priest.

From Eyeries (near Castletownbere), County Cork, Ireland, Harrington was educated at Newbridge College, County Kildare, before entering the Dominican Novitiate in St. Mary's Priory, in Cork. He studied philosophy at St. Mary's Tallaght then the Dominican Studium, and completing a BA degree, before going to Rome. He studied theology at the Angelicum (Pontifical University of Saint Thomas Aquinas) in Rome earning an Licentiate of Sacred Theology (STL) degree and biblical studies in Jerusalem at the École Biblique, earning a LSS degree, Pontifical Biblical Institute.

He lectured in scripture at St. Mary's, The Priory Institute, Tallaght, at the Milltown Institute of Theology and Philosophy, and at the Church of Ireland Theological College, all of which are in Dublin. He also taught in summer schools in the United States, and lectured in Scripture at Maynooth College and Trinity College, Dublin.

Sinead O'Connor, who studied Old Testament Scripture at the Milltown Institute, under Harrington, dedicated her 2007 album to him.

== Published works ==
- Mark: Realistic Theologian
- Matthew: Sage Theologian
- Luke: Gracious Theologian
- John: Spiritual Theologian
- Revelation
- The Path of Biblical Theology (1973)
- Key to the Bible (1974)
- Jesus Our Brother: The Humanity of the Lord by Wilfrid J. Harrington OP, Paulist Press (2012)
- Our Merciful God, By Wilfrid Harrington O.P., Dominican Publications, Dublin, (2015).

== See also ==
- Dominicans in Ireland
