= Henry Flanagan =

Irish Dominican priest

Henry Flanagan, O.P. (1918–1992) was an Irish Dominican priest, teacher, musician, artist, and sculptor.

Fr. Flanagan was born in Dublin in 1918, the son of a carpenter. He attended the O'Connell School before joining the Dominican Order in 1936. He was ordained in 1943 and in 1945 joined Newbridge College, where he taught English, history, art, and music; he also served for many years as Deputy Headmaster and supervised productions of Gilbert and Sullivan Operettas. Fr Flanagan was dedicated to the arts and, in the summers, would visit stately homes in England, returning with slides of the buildings, their art works, and gardens in an attempt, not always appreciated at the time, to teach pupils an appreciation of the arts.

For his sculpture, he was known as the Preacher in Stone, one newer art format he was interested in was plastic sculpture. Fr Flanagan created some 400 works (both religious and secular) in wood, stone, concrete, plaster, plastic, copper, bronze, and enamels.

To honour Fr. Flanagan's contribution to music, an Annual Henry Flanagan Memorial Concert is held in Newbridge, in which various musicians and choirs participate.

The Centenary of his birth was celebrated in the Dominicans, at The Priory Institute in Dublin, with the display of a number of his sculptures in March 2019.

== Works ==
- Statue of St. Colman, Newry Cathedral 1991.
- War Widows, Polished Limestone 1991. https://www.whytes.ie/art/war-widows-1991/149724/?SearchString=&LotNumSearch=&GuidePrice=&OrderBy=&ArtistID=&ArrangeBy=list&NumPerPage=15&offset=90
- The Girl with the Flaxen Hair, Sculpture in Sycamore, 1979. https://www.whytes.ie/art/the-girl-with-the-flaxen-hair-1979/144347/?SearchString=&LotNumSearch=&GuidePrice=&OrderBy=&ArtistID=15323&ArrangeBy=list&NumPerPage=15&offset=0
- Fr. Peter O’Higgins Dominican Martyr , stone sculpture, Church of St Eustace, Dominican Priory / Newbridge College.
