= Thomas O'Loughlin =

Irish theologian (born 1958)

- Born: 1958 (age 67–68); Dublin
- Citizenship: Irish
- Occupation: theologian

Academic background
- Education: University College Dublin; Maynooth College
- Thesis: The structure and nature of the Latin Genesis tradition in the period a. d. 430-800 (1997)

Academic work
- Discipline: Theology
- Institutions: University College Dublin; Milltown Institute of Theology and Philosophy; University of Wales, Lampeter; University of Nottingham

Thomas John Jude O'Loughlin (born 1958, Dublin) is Professor of Historical Theology at the University of Nottingham. He earned a BA, MPhil, PhD (NUI), STB (Maynooth) and DD hon.c (Bangor).

== Career ==
O'Loughlin studied for his BA in Philosophy and Medieval History at University College Dublin, before going to Maynooth College for his BD(STB), then moving back to do an MPhil. He holds a Diploma in Theology from Mater Dei in Dublin, and a Diploma in Pastoral Theology from All Hallows College, Dublin.

O'Loughlin began his career as a teacher at University College Dublin, and also taught at the Dominican Studium, Tallaght and the Milltown Institute of Theology and Philosophy. He was later made a scholar at the School of Celtic Studies in the Dublin Institute for Advanced Studies. In 1997, he worked in the Department of Theology and Religious Studies in the University of Wales, Lampeter, where he became the first Professor of Historical Theology in the University of Wales in February 2006. He joined the University of Nottingham in 2009. He is a priest of the Catholic diocese of Arundel and Brighton.

== Research ==
His research has focused on the theology of the early medieval period, and on the works of insular writers in particular. Fr. O'Loughlin has contributed to many periodicals and journals such as the Irish Theological Quarterly, Milltown Studies, The Tablet, Cambrian Medieval Celtic Studies, Doctrine and Life and The Furrow. O'Loughlin is chief editor of the Brepols series: Studia Traditionis Theologiae.

He has also served as president of the Catholic Theological Association of Great Britain. In 2020 he was admitted as a member of the Royal Irish Academy.

== Bibliography ==
=== Books ===
- O'Loughlin, Thomas (1999). Saint Patrick: the man and his works. London: SPCK.
- Celtic Theology: Humanity, World and God in Early Irish Writings (Continuum [Cassell], London 2000).
- Journeys on the Edges (D.L.T., London / Orbis, New York, 2000).
- Liturgical Resources for Lent and Eastertide (Columba Press, Dublin 2004).
- Discovering Saint Patrick (D.L.T., London / Paulist Press, New York/Mahwah, N.J., 2005).
- Liturgical Resources for Advent and Christmastide (Columba Press, Dublin 2006).
- Liturgical Resources for the Year of Luke (Columba Press, Dublin 2006).
- Adomnán and the Holy Places: The Perceptions of an Insular Monk on the Location of the Biblical Drama (T. & T. Clark, London 2007).
- Liturgical Resources for the Year of Matthew (Columba Press, Dublin 2007).
- Explaining the Lectionary for Readers (Columba Press, Dublin 2008).
- Liturgical Resources for the Year of Mark (Columba Press, Dublin 2008).
- The Didache: A Window on the Earliest Christians , (Baker Academic, Grand Rapids 2010).
- Oliver, Simon; Kilby, Karen; O'Loughlin, Tom, eds. (2012). Faithful Reading: New Essays in Theology in Honour of Fergus Kerr, OP. London: T & T Clark. ISBN 978-0-567-64403-9.

=== Articles ===
- O'Loughlin, Thomas (November 2021). "Liturgy, inculturation and the reception of Sacrosanctum concilium 37–40: an on–going project for those who preside?". New Blackfriars. 102 (1102): 967–978. doi:10.1111/nbfr.12614.
