= James Joseph Carbery =

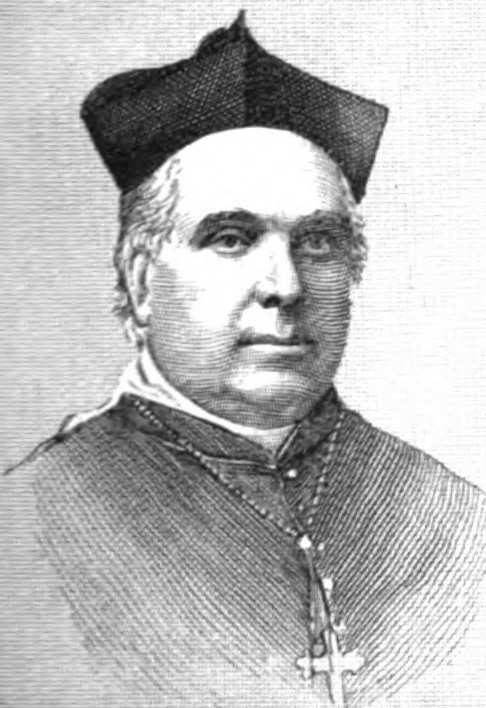
- Born: May 1, 1823; County Westmeath, Ireland
- Died: December 17, 1887 (aged 64); Cork, Ireland

James Joseph Carbery (1 May 1823 – 17 December 1887), was an Irish Dominican, who became the third Bishop of Hamilton, Canada.

== Life ==
Carbery's early education was received at the Seminary of Navan. At an early age, he entered enrolled in the Order of St. Dominic, studying philosophy and theology at Viterbo and Rome. He served at the San Clemente Church in Rome, before he returned to Ireland in 1849, firstly to St. Mary's Cork, filled many important positions in his order, and became an assistant to the master general. While in Limerick, where he served as Prior, Dr. Carbery oversaw many improvements to St Saviour's Church, Limerick. He was briefly prior in Cork before being summoned to Rome in 1880.

In 1883, Carbery was appointed Bishop of Hamilton, Canada, and was consecrated in Rome, 11 November of the same year. He died while seeking to restore his failing health while visiting his native country, in Cork, on December 19, and was buried in the little convent cemetery in Limerick.

== See also ==
- Dominicans in Ireland
