= Vincent Dillon =

Vincent Dillon was an Irish Dominican martyr, who died 1651.

Vincent Gerald Dillon was a native of Athenry who lived in London during the 1640s. He had formerly been a vicar at the Irish Dominican convent(Corpo Santo) in Lisbon. He became a chaplain to the Irish royalist forces in during the Civil War in England. According to O'Reilly, he was taken prisoner by the rebels after the "Battle of York", possibly referring to the Battle of Marston Moor. He was kept in prison in York where he died of hardship and hunger about 1651.
