= Sam Coghlan Murray =

Irish rugby union player

Sam Coughlan Murray
- Born: Sam Coughlan Murray; 31 January 1992 (age 34) Brisbane, Australia
- Height: 1.78 m (5 ft 10 in)
- Weight: 85 kg (13 st 5 lb)
- School: Newbridge College
- University: University College Dublin

Rugby union career
- Position: Wing
- Current team: Nottingham
Amateur team(s)
| Years | Team | Apps | (Points) |
- St Mary's College
Senior career
| Years | Team | Apps | (Points) |
| 2013-15 | Leinster | 2 | (0) |
| 2015-16 | Nottingham | 22 | (0) |
- Correct as of 23 Apr 2016
International career
| Years | Team | Apps | (Points) |
| 2012 | Ireland U20 | 4 | (0) |
- Correct as of 12 June 2012

Sam Coghlan Murray (born 31 January 1992) is an Irish rugby union player for Nottingham. His preferred position is on the wing. He made his senior debut for Leinster in February 2014 against Zebre. It was announced in May 2014 that he would be promoted from the academy to the Leinster senior squad for the season commencing 2014-15.
