= Lizzie Twigg =

Irish poet, Gaelic revivalist

- Born: 1882; Bengal, India
- Died: 3 January 1933 (age 50-51); Limerick, Ireland
- Writing career
- Pen name: Éilis Ní Chraoibhín
- Genre: Poetry

Lizzie Twigg (c. 1882 – 1933) was an Irish poet and Gaelic revivalist who was famously known for her appearance in Ulysses by James Joyce.

== Life and work ==
Despite being known as a character in Ulysses, Lizzie Twigg was a real person. Born Eliza Ann Twigg in Bengal, India to British soldier, Sergeant Major William Twigg and his wife Frances. He retired to live in Limerick where he worked as a clerk when she was a small child. Twigg was educated in the local Presentation Convent school on Sexton street. She worked in London and Dublin as well as living in Limerick.

Twigg was a protégé of George William Russell and an ardent nationalist. She wrote poems for the dominican published monthly the Irish Rosary and the United Irishman in February 1903. Her volume of poems was called Songs and Poems in 1904. Although quite well known by her penname Éilis Ní Chraoibhín in Arthur Griffith's paper, she was largely forgotten by the time of her death and today it is her appearance in Ulysses for which she is best remembered.

She died after a long illness in Limerick on 3 January 1933.
