= St. Mary's Dominican Church and Priory =

Dominican church & priory, Ireland

St Mary’s Dominican Priory
- St Mary’s Dominican Church and Priory
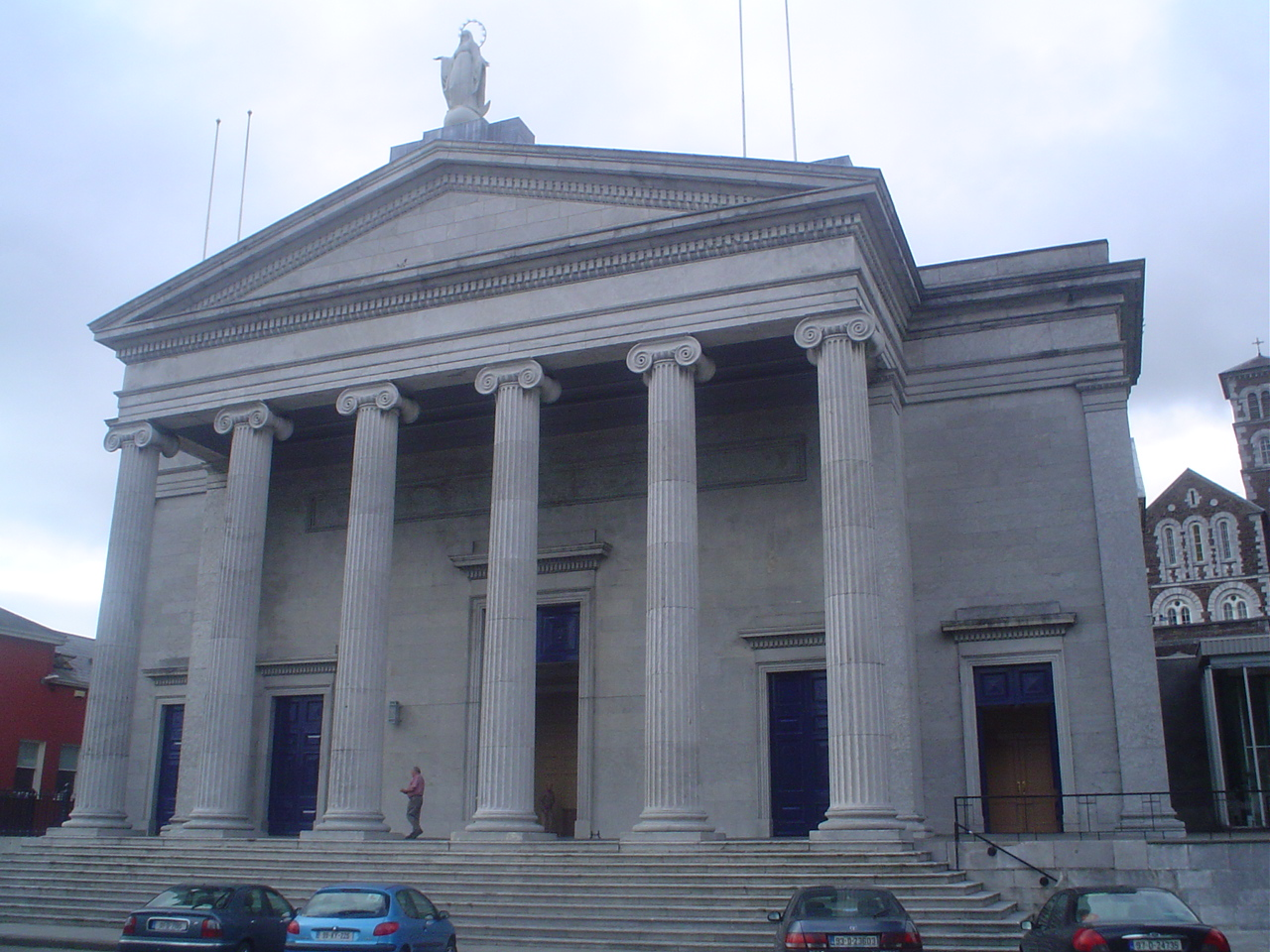

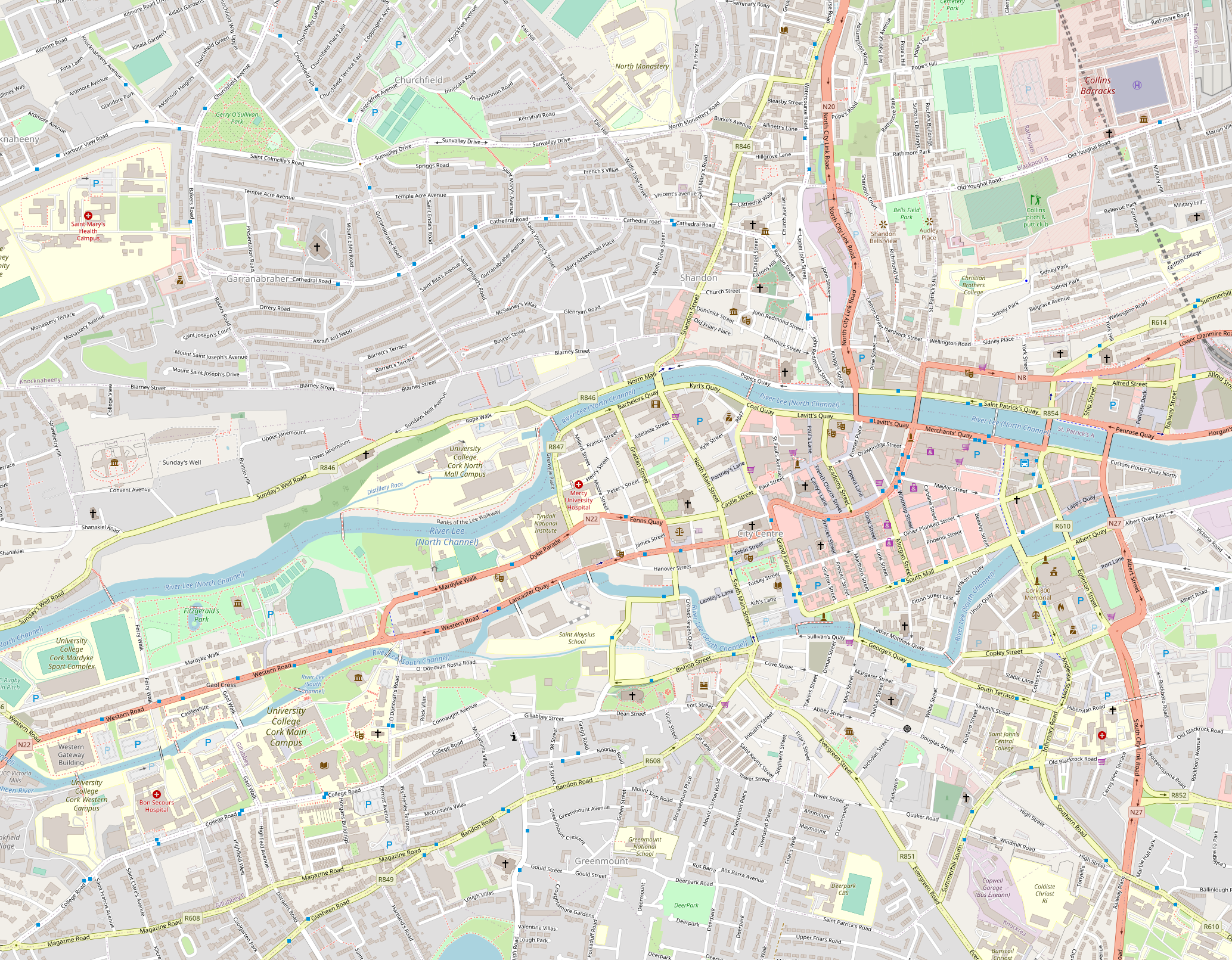
- 51.9015°N 8.4750°W
- Location: Pope’s Quay, Cork.
- Country: Ireland
- Language: English
- Denomination: Roman Catholic
- Tradition: Roman Rite
- Religious order: Dominicans
- Website: dominicanscork.ie

History
- Consecrated: 1839

Architecture
- Architect: Kearns Deane
- Architectural type: Church
- Groundbreaking: 1832

St. Mary's Dominican Church and Priory, Pope's Quay in Cork, Ireland, is run by the Dominican Order. It serves as a local church and a priory housing a community of Dominican friars, and a novitiate for the order.

Building of the church on the Pope's Quay site commenced in 1832, and the church opened on October 20, 1839, with Daniel O'Connell in attendance. The architect was Kearns Deane, a Protestant and from the Deane family of architects, for no charge, and Fr B.T. Russell was responsible for delivering the church. In 1850 architect William Atkins built the priory in a neo-Romanesque style. George Goldie designed all the elements of the sanctuary (including the pulpit and the high altar). Extensive renovations to the church took place in 1991. The St Martin's Chapel, at St. Mary's which was added in 1972, was restored and renovated in 2017.

From 2020 until 2022, the Dominicans at St. Mary's hosted and supported an independent private secondary school, Mater Dei Academy. In 2022, this school moved to the Farranferris Education and Training Campus.

A chapter of the Lay Dominicans meets in the pastoral centre, also, counseling services are offered from the centre, as well as being used for meetings of other groups such as Alcoholics, Narcotics, and Gamblers Anonymous. In 2021 the priory applied to extend the use of the pastoral centre so as it could be used as a school. St Mary's, hosts talks and the order runs and members of the community lecture on a number of short courses in theology, philosophy, and Christology.

== Novitiate ==
St. Mary's Cork serves as the Novitiate for the Dominicans' Province of Ireland, where a novice would spend a year, studying philosophy. After completing a year Novices make their first simple profession, before progressing to the Studium (St. Saviour’s Priory, Dublin) for further study in philosophy and theology and taking vows.

== People associated with St. Mary's Priory ==
- James Joseph Carbery OP, briefly prior in 1880 in Cork (earlier served in Cork from 1849 to 1860), later Bishop of Hamilton, Canada.
- Wilfrid Harrington OP, theologian spent his novice year in St. Mary's
- John Pius Leahy, OP, educated a professor in Lisbon, elected prior in St. Mary's, in 1847, later became Bishop of Dromore.
- Vincent Mercer, OP, a convicted child sexual abuser who committed multiple acts in St. Marys and during his time as headmaster of Newbridge College.
- Philip Mulryne OP, was a novice in 2012, appointed master of novices in 2019.
- Jerome Murphy-O'Connor OP, biblical scholar served his novice year in St. Mary's
- Robert Rivas OP, novice in Cork, served as Archbishop of Castries, Saint Lucia
