= All Saints College, Belfast =

All Saints College/ Coláiste na Naomh Uile
- All Saints College, Glen Road, BT11 8BW/ Beechmount, Belfast, BT12 7NA; Belfast; Northern Ireland

Information
- Type: Comprehensive School
- Motto: (Be Ready, Be Respectful, Be Safe)
- Religious affiliation: Roman Catholic
- Established: 2019
- Local authority: Education Authority, Belfast
- Principal: Damien Coyle
- Gender: Co-educational
- Age: 11 to 18
- Colour
- Website: https://www.allsaintscollege.co.uk/

All Saints College / Coláiste na Naomh Uile is a non-selective, Catholic Maintained, all ability, school for girls and boys aged 11–18 years located in West Belfast, Northern Ireland. It was founded in 2019 following the amalgamation of St Rose's High School, with Christian Brothers School, Glen Road and Corpus Christi College. The college operates from two campuses on the Glen Road (former home to Christian Brothers School or CBS) and in the Beechmount area of Belfast (former home to St Rose's Dominican College). The College has had confirmation for a brand new purpose built site to accommodate all year groups expected to be complete by the next decade on the former site of Cross and Passion and the existing Glen Road campus (junior school).

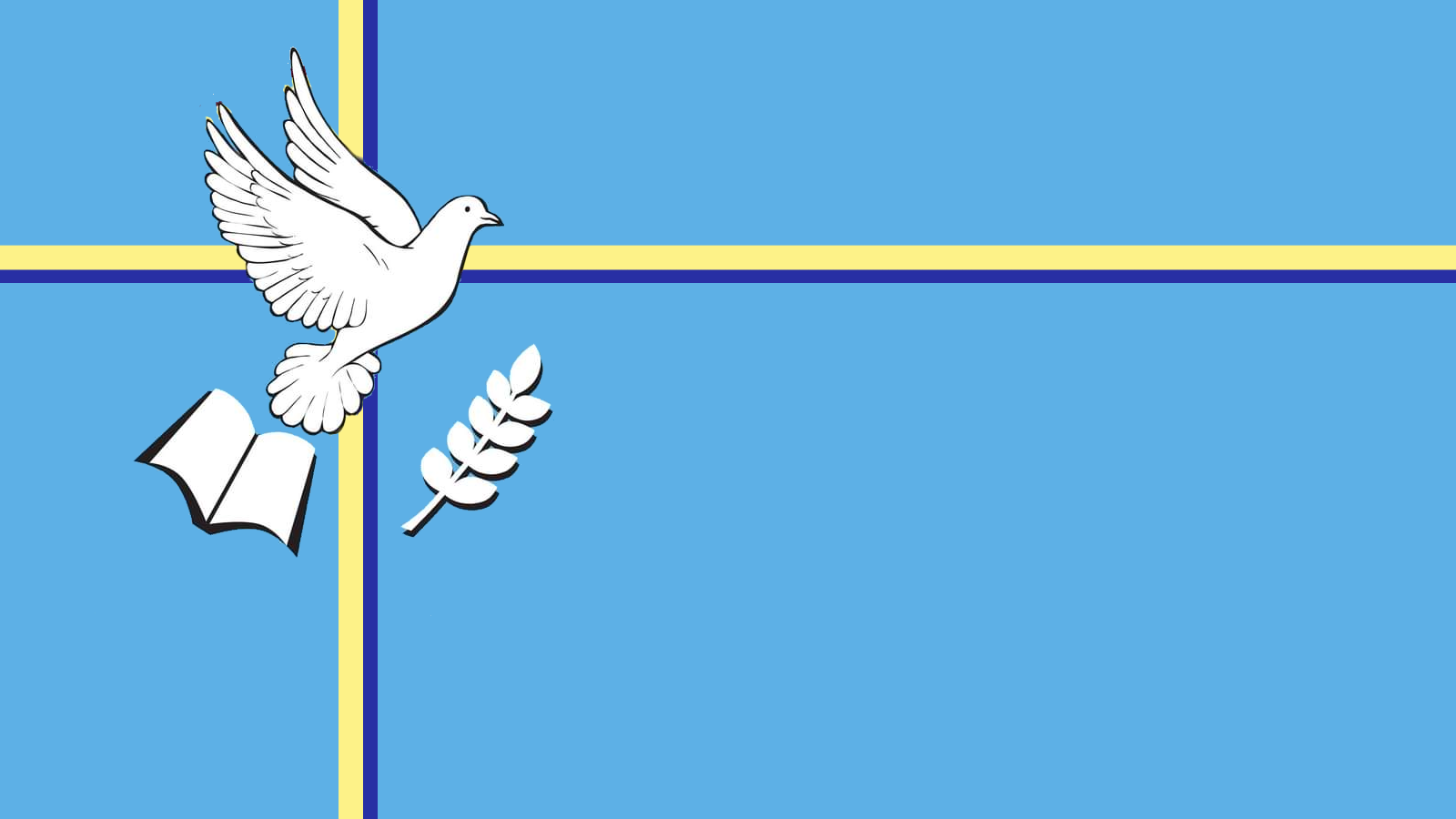
Flag

== History ==
In 2019, St Rose's High School amalgamated with Christian Brothers School, Glen Road and Corpus Christi College to form this school which took the name All Saints College / Coláiste na Naomh Uile. It is under the trusteeship of the Edmund Rice Schools Trust (NI).

== Awards ==
In 2020 it received the School of Sanctuary award.
