= Albert Manifold =

Irish businessman (born 1962)

- Born: August 1962 (age 64); Ireland
- Education: Dublin City University (MBA)
- Occupation: Businessman
- Children: 3

Albert Manifold (born 1962) is an Irish business executive. He was chief executive of CRH from 2014 to 2024 and chair of BP from October 2025 until his removal in May 2026.

== Early and personal life ==
Manifold was born in August 1962, in Ireland. His parents ran a hardware store in the Dublin suburb of Kimmage.

He attended Templeogue College, and then went on to attend Dublin City University where he did a master's degree in Business Studies and a Master of Business Administration. He is a qualified Chartered Accountant and Certified Public Accountant.

As of April 2018, he lived in South County Wicklow. He is married and has three children. He is a follower of Leinster Rugby, and played prop forward at Templeogue College. Manifold is also an avid beekeeper. In his childhood years, he helped a priest with a beehive.

== Career ==
Before joining CRH, Manifold was chief operating officer (COO) with Dublin investment firm Allen Maguire & Partners, which was backed by various US pension funds. Manifold was then COO and a board member of Irish building materials company CRH plc from January 2009 until his appointment as CEO in January 2014. He exited his role at CRH in 2024, after 28 years at the company.

In July 2025, he was appointed chairman of BP, effective 1 October 2025, replacing Helge Lund. In May 2026, BP's board unanimously decided to remove Manifold as chairman with immediate effect, citing "serious" concerns about his conduct, such as "bullying" and "overbearing" behaviour. Manifold publicly rejected the company's reasons for dismissal, saying "I dispute entirely the characterisation of my conduct,".
