= Michael MacDonagh (bishop) =

Irish Roman Catholic prelate

Styles of Michael MacDonagh, O.P.
- Reference style: The Most Reverend
- Spoken style: My Lord
- Religious style: Bishop

Michael MacDonagh, O.P. (1698–1746) was an Irish Roman Catholic prelate who served as the Bishop of Kilmore from 1728 to 1746.

From Coleraine, County Londonderry, he joined the Dominicans in St. Mary's Coleraine, before pursuing his formation in Pesaro, Italy, before going to Rome and the Irish Dominicans at SS Sixtus and Clement. He completed further study at College of St Thomas in Naples and was ordained in 1723 by the bishop, Pietro Orsini, a fellow Dominican and the future pope Benedict XIII.

A Dominican friar, he was appointed the Bishop of the Diocese of Kilmore by the Holy See on 2 December 1728. His episcopal ordination took place in the Palace of the Vatican on 12 December 1728; the principal consecrator was Pope Benedict XIII.

Bishop MacDonagh returned to Ireland in 1730, but was forced to flee the country in 1739. In a Sacred Congregation for the Propagation of the Faith, held in Rome on 6 December 1740, he informed the cardinals that he had personally governed the see for nine years, but was incarcerated by Irish magistrates in July 1739. As a Roman Catholic prelate, he would have incurred the penalties of high treason had he not been rescued from the hands of his jailers. On making his escape to Dublin a reward of £200 was offered for his apprehension. His cross, rings, books and papers had been taken from him to serve as evidences of his episcopal rank.

He remained in exile until his death in Lisbon, Portugal on 26 November 1746, aged 48, and was buried there in the College of Corpo Santo church of the Irish Dominicans.

== Notes ==
Catholic Church titles
Preceded by Hugh MacMahon as Apostolic Administrator of Kilmore	Bishop of Kilmore; 1728 – 1746	Succeeded by Laurence Richardson as Bishop of Kilmore
