= Gort na Móna Secondary School =

I secondary school in County Antrim

Gort Na Móna Secondary School

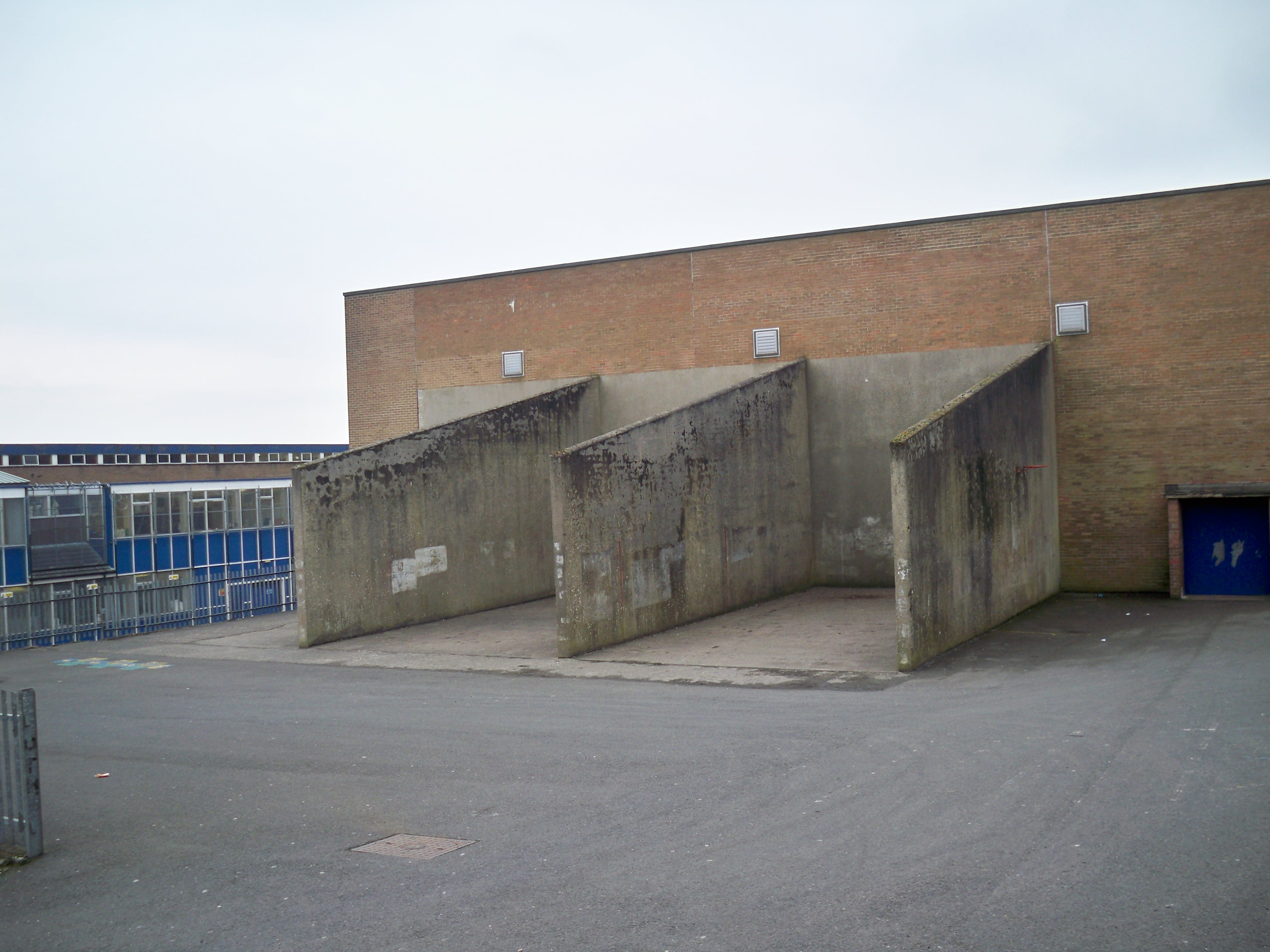
- Handball courts

Location
- Upper Springfield Road; Belfast, County Antrim, BT12 7QP; Northern Ireland
- 54°35′37″N 5°59′37″W

Information
- Type: Private secondary school
- Religious affiliation: Catholicism
- Denomination: Congregation of Christian Brothers
- Established: 1971
- Founder: Br. D.M. O'Connell
- Status: Closed
- Closed: 1988
- School number: 123/0179/12
- Gender: Boys
- Age range: 11-16
- Colours: Maroon, sky blue and saffron
- Sports: Gaelic football and handball, hurling

Gort na Móna Secondary School was a private Catholic secondary school for boys aged 11–16, located in Belfast, County Antrim, Northern Ireland. In 1988 it was amalgamated with three other schools to become Corpus Christi College, Belfast, and in 2019 was itself amalgamated with two other schools to become All Saints College, Belfast.

== History ==
Gort na Móna Secondary School opened in September 1971 with 120 pupils. The first school premises were located at the current Gort na Móna GAC site in Turf Lodge and consisted of a series of wooden huts while construction of the main building took place.

In 1988, the school amalgamated with St Thomas's Secondary School, St Peter's Secondary School, and St Paul's Secondary School to become Corpus Christi College, Belfast.

In 2019, Corpus Christi College amalgamated with St Rose's Dominican College and the Christian Brothers School, Glen Road. The new school is called All Saints College / Coláiste na Naomh Uile.

== Facilities ==
Purpose-built buildings were opened in 1973, on a green field site with space for sports pitches and playing fields. Three open-air handball courts were added to the side of the building at the Dermott Hill entrance. The school continued to expand and in 1980 there were 36 teachers and 550 pupils. One building housed the classrooms where science, Irish language, maths, geography, religion, english, music, art, technology and design were taught. The sports hall was located in the other building. As of 2013 the buildings were being used by St Gerard's Education Centre.

== Uniform ==
The uniform policy consisted of a black blazer, grey shirt, grey jumper, maroon tie with thin saffron line, black trousers and black shoes; however, this policy was lightly enforced by staff and after pupils entered their second year they could wear almost any attire except jeans.

== Sport ==
As a school run by the Congregation of Christian Brothers it had strong Gaelic Athletic Association ties. Gaelic football, handball, and hurling were encouraged and developed, leaving a legacy in the surrounding housing estates of Dermott Hill, New Barnsley and Turf Lodge.

Brother T.F. Moroney was responsible for the development for the teams and choose the dominant maroon colour of Galway GAA as well as sky blue and saffron for the school team colours. Funding for the school kits and hurly sticks came from profits gained from the school tuck shop. Moroney later helped found Gort na Móna GAC in 1974.
