= Christian Brothers School, Glen Road =

Christian Brothers School
- Irish: Scoil na mBráithre Críostaí

Location
- Belfast; Northern Ireland; 54°34′48″N 5°59′49″W

Information
- Motto: Commitment, Belief, Success
- Denomination: Christian Brothers
- Established: 1962
- Status: Closed
- Closed: 2019
- Principal: Bronagh Farrimond
- Enrollment: 750
- Website: www.cbsglenroad.com

Christian Brothers' School or CBS, (Irish: Scoil na mBráithre Críostaí), was a secondary school on the Glen Road, west Belfast, Northern Ireland.

CBS was founded in 1962 by the Christian Brothers, a religious order founded by Edmund Ignatius Rice in the early 19th century.

== Education ==
Educating the children of Belfast has always been the school's main aim, however before 2004 the school could only provide 5 years of secondary education. This was a result of the school's structure as it could not hold more than 750 pupils. The maximum year that a pupil could reach at the school was Year 12 (5th year). While in 5th year, the pupils would complete their GCSEs and await their results. After each pupil had received their GCSE results, they would then have to go in search of another school (secondary or grammar) that would accommodate their need for further education in the form of AS- Levels and A-Levels. The main choice, of course, was St Mary's Grammar School.

In 2004 however, under the direction of Gerry Scannell (former Vice Principal and temporary Principal until the arrival of Tom Armstrong), the option to stay at the school to study AS-levels and A-Levels was granted. The school was gradually changed to accommodate the Sixth form's educational needs and has continued to change to the present day.

As of 2007, 96 Lower Sixth pupils have been accepted into the school, a record breaking number for the school. Most of the 96 pupils are returning students. However, a small minority of the 96 students come from different schools. In 2008 CBS accepted over 117 pupils into lower sixth, and for the first time in the school's history, female students were allowed to enroll in the school.

=== Aisling Award ===
In November 2007, CBS was nominated for an Aisling Award (Part of the Aisling Awards Ceremony) in the category for Outstanding Education Endeavour. According to BelfastMedia.com, CBS was "nominated for their radical transformation in the school's delivery of a broadened curriculum which now included vocational qualifications and A-Level subjects."

It was announced by the Belfast Media Group that CBS had won the award for Outstanding Education Endeavour.

=== Science in conjunction with University of Ulster ===
In 2006, CBS was one of the first schools in Northern Ireland to participate in a new applied GCE science course known as Step-Up to Science, or simply Step-Up.

This new course was brought to Belfast as a pilot test for the North and is currently in its 8th year in Derry; where it originated, and as of 2007, is currently in its second year in Belfast. Step-Up is a science course provided by the University of Ulster and all the modules in the course are provided and examined by AQA. If students successfully complete the course with either AA, BB, CC, DD or EE, they will be awarded with UCAS points, just like the current regular A-Level courses. The course is currently accepted at the University of Ulster and other universities accept the course as a double GCE applied course.

Taken from the University of Ulster's summary of the Step-Up programme, from their official website.

The programme operates successfully in the North-West of the province and actively involves the University, schools, local industry, the local hospital and government agencies in a collaborative partnership. The partner organisations contribute to the teaching of the General Certificate of Education (GCE) Applied Science formerly Advanced Vocational Certificate in Education within a highly structured programme of academic and vocational activities which are delivered in the schools and the University, and through experience in local industry and the hospital.

== Amalgamation ==
In 2019, CBS Glen Road amalgamated with St Rose's Dominican College and Corpus Christi College. The new school is called All Saints College / Coláiste na Naomh Uile.

== See also ==
- List of secondary schools in Belfast
