= Doctrine and Life =

Doctrine and Life is an Irish religious periodical published by the Dominican religious order. It was initially published from September 1946 as part of the Irish Rosary magazine. From February 1951 it was published as a separate periodical, under its founding editor Fr. Anselm Moynihan. From 1951 to 1961 it was published bimonthly, before becoming a monthly publication in January 1961.

Prominent Irish priest Fr Austin Flannery O.P., became its second editor in 1957, editing it up until 1988. It is now published ten times a year and the present editor (and a director of Dominican Publications) is Fr. Bernard Treacy, O.P. Religious Life Review (incorporated as a supplement in Doctrine and Life), evolved from a monthly supplement starting in 1969, edited by Fr. Flannery until 2003, and Thomas McCarthy, OP (Collegio San Clemente) served as editor from 2003 until 2016.

Other contributors have included David Begg, Liz Murphy RSM, Dr. Thomas O'Loughlin, Rebecca Roberts and Dr. Thomas R. Whelan CSSp.

== See also ==
- Dominicans in Ireland
