= Thomas Raymond Hyland =

Roman Catholic bishop

Thomas Raymond Hyland was an Irish Dominican priest who served as Coadjutor Bishop for the Roman Catholic Archdiocese of Port of Spain, Trinidad and Tobago, Antilles (and Titular Bishop of Evaria).

Hyland was born in Dublin, on 3 November 1837. In February 1856 he entered St. Mary's Priory, Tallaght, to become a Dominican. In 1864 he was ordained, a priest of the Order of Friars Preachers (Dominicans), completing his studies in Rome where he obtained a degree in theology. He served as prior to the Dominican house and Holy Cross Church in Tralee, County Kerry, when he was appointed Bishop. Mgr. Hyland was ordained a Bishop at the Basilica of San Clemente, Rome, in 1882.

Hyland died on 9 October 1884 in Trinidad, after contracting typhoid.
