= St Rose's Dominican College =

St. Rose's Dominican College

Location
- 65 Beechmount; Belfast, BT12 7NA; Northern Ireland; 54°35′41″N 5°57′36″W

Information
- Type: Comprehensive school
- Motto: Latin: Veritas (Truth)
- Religious affiliation: Catholicism
- Denomination: Dominican order
- Patron saint: Rose of Lima
- Established: 1961
- Status: Closed
- Closed: 2019
- Local authority: Belfast Education and Library Board
- Gender: Girls
- Age: 11 to 18
- Colours: Navy and blue
- Website: www.stroses.org

St Rose's Dominican College was a non-selective, Catholic Maintained, all ability, school for girls aged 11–18 years located in West Belfast, Northern Ireland. It was founded in 1961 by nuns of the Dominican order who also ran the neighbouring St Dominic's Grammar School for Girls. The college was located in the Beechmount area of the Falls Road. The school motto was Veritas, meaning truth, showing St Rose's pride in their aim for proper catholic education. It became part of All Saints College / Coláiste na Naomh Uile in 2019.

== History ==
The foundation stone of the school was laid by the Rt Rev Monsignor James Hendley, Archdeacon, DD, PP, VG, on 30 August 1959. St Rose's board of governors held their first meeting on 27 March 1961. The school was opened officially and blessed by the Most Rev Dr Mageean exactly two years later, on 30 August 1961.

The 1.11-hectare (2.75-acre) site was donated by the Dominican community and was situated on the old Dominican farm that had helped provide food for the convent. The Clowney River skirted around and was piped beneath the site of the new school. The school motto is Veritas, meaning truth, showing St Rose's pride in their aim for proper catholic education. The school is named for St Rose of Lima.

In 2019, St Rose's Dominican College amalgamated with Christian Brothers School, Glen Road and Corpus Christi College. The new school is called All Saints College / Coláiste na Naomh Uile.

== Alumni ==
- Angela Feeney (born 1954) – opera singer

== See also ==
- List of secondary schools in Belfast
