= The Priory Institute =

Irish university

- Motto: Laudare, Benedicere, Praedicare
- Motto in English: To Praise, To Bless, To Preach
- Type: Online Theology Programmes
- Religious affiliation: Catholic (Dominican)
- Academic affiliations: HETAC (1993-2011); University of Wales, Trinity Saint David (2004–11); Institute of Technology, Tallaght (2011–2019); Technological University of Dublin (2019–present)
- Director: Fr. John Littleton
- Location: The Village, Tallaght, Dublin, Ireland; 53.2889°N 6.3602°W
- Campus: Tallaght Village
- Website: www.prioryinstitute.com
- Location within Dublin

The Priory Institute, is part of the St. Mary's Dominican Priory on the grounds of the old Tallaght Castle, Dublin 24, Ireland and provides, certificate, diploma, and degree programmes in theology and philosophy.

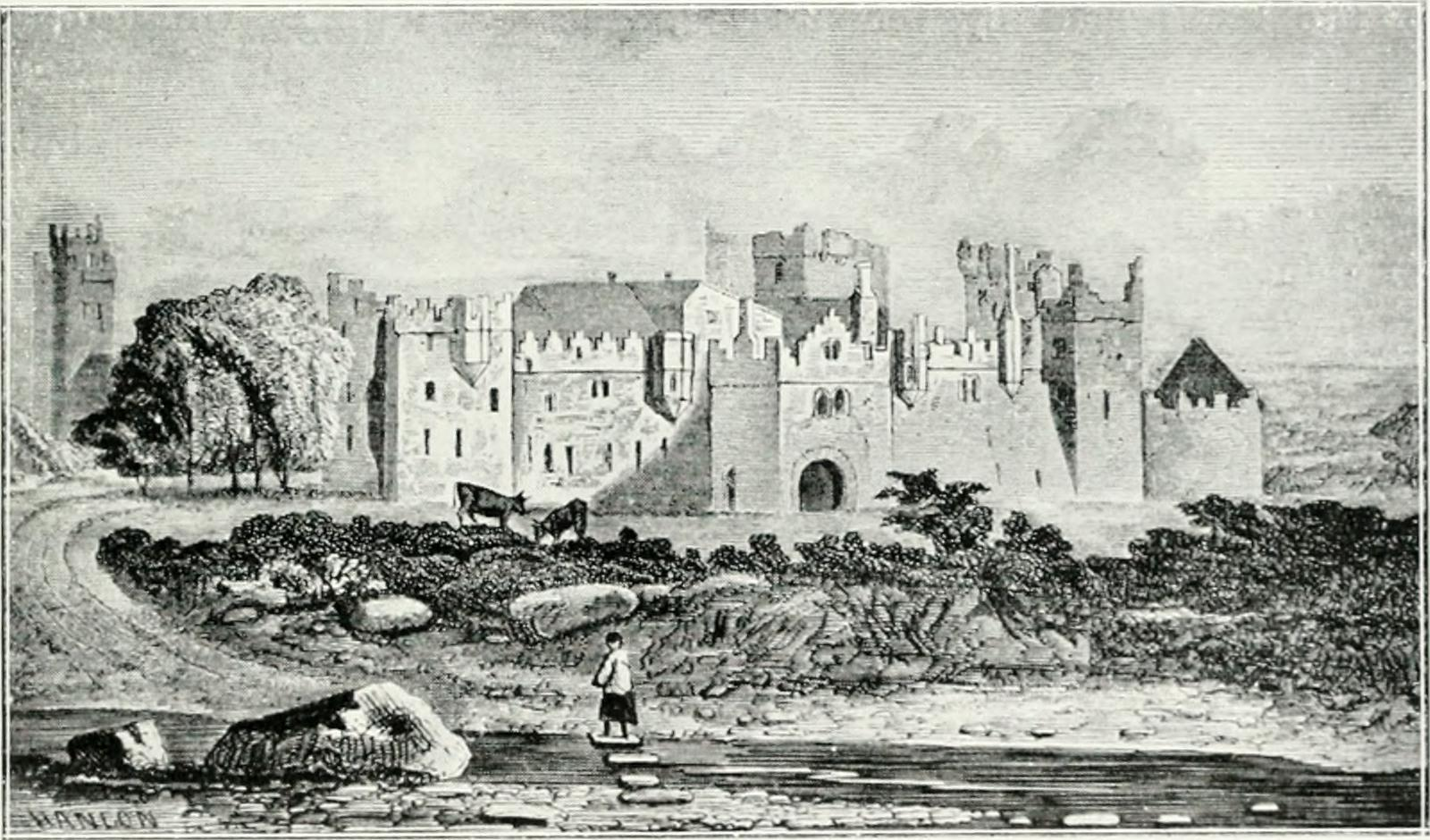
Tallaght Castle

== Course accreditation ==
In 2011, the Institute entered into partnership with The Institute of Technology, Tallaght (ITT). As a delegated authority of Quality and Qualifications Ireland (QQI), The Institute of Technology, Tallaght validate all the academic programmes at The Priory institute. QQI is a public body, which is accountable to the Irish government and the Oireachtas and is the national accreditation board for higher education qualifications in Ireland. The institute's certificates, diplomas and degrees are aligned with the National Framework of Qualifications NFQ structure.

From 2019 the Technological University Dublin accredits programmes at the Priory Institute, following the merger of the Institute of Technology into the new university.

In addition the Accreditation Service for International Colleges (ASIC), recognises The Priory Institute as a Premier Institution.

== History ==
A new Regional Technical College, which became the Institute of Technology Tallaght, was opened in 1992 beside St. Mary's Priory, in 1993 The Dominican order transferred 20 acres of the priory's land to the Department of Education for the RTC's development. From 1993 until 2001 an NCEA Diploma in Theology programme was offered by St. Mary's Priory, alongside other adult education and pastoral programmes. Initially, programmes were validated by the NCEA, then from 2001, its successor HETAC, from 2004 programmes were validated by University of Wales, Lampeter along with HETAC. In 2000 the Studium was moved to St. Saviour's Priory, Dorset Street, Dublin, and The Priory Institute was established in Tallaght. Watchmen Raise Their Voices: A Tallaght Book of Theology was published in 2006 to celebrate 150 years of theological study in the priory in Tallaght.

The Institute host the Annual Priory Institute Aquinas Lecture. Those who have delivered the lectures include the poet and Dominican Paul Murray OP (before the lecture the STM degree from the Angelicum was conferred on Prof. Murray at a ceremony in St Mary's Priory), Timothy Radcliffe OP, Wojciech Giertych OP and Marcel Paluch OP therector of the Angelicum. COVID-19 resulted in the annual lecture being delivered over Zoom, the 2022 lecture was given by Innocent Smith OP.

== Notable people associated with St. Mary's Dominican Priory in Tallaght ==
- Archbishop Kevin William Barden O.P. – Theologian and Archbishop of Isphahan of the Latins, in Iran, he studied in St. Mary's Priory, and taught in St. Marys' for 30 years.
- Thomas Nicholas Burke O.P., a preacher who in 1859 founded St. Mary's Priory as a novitiate, served as prior(1863–64), and is buried in Tallaght.
- Leonard Boyle O.P., the medieval studies and paleography scholar, studied in St. Mary's before being ordained.
- Cardinal Michael Browne served as Master of Novices in Tallaght
- Austin Flannery O.P., editor, publisher, and social justice campaigner, trained in Tallaght.
- Archbishop Thomas Raymond Hyland O.P., of Port of Spain, Trinidad, trained in Tallaght
- Gay Mitchell, former Lord Mayor, TD, minister, and MEP, earned a BA and MA from The Priory Institute
- Jerome Murphy-O'Connor O.P. – Historian, studied in Tallaght
- Michael Murphy – Newsreader, was a Dominican Novice in Tallaght
- Wilfrid Harrington O.P., Scripture lecturer at the Priory Institute and Dominican House of Studies
- Robert Rivas OP, attended the Studium in Tallaght, served as Archbishop of Castries, Saint Lucia
- Patrick Finbar Ryan, O.P., Archbishop of Port of Spain (1940–1966), provincial of the Irish Dominican Province (1921–1926 and 1930–1934)
- Robert Spence O.P., Archbishop of Adelaide, a novice in Tallaght before going to Corpo Santo, Lisbon

== See also ==
- St. Mary's Dominican Church and Priory, Cork, Dominican Priory and Novitiate
- St. Saviour’s Priory, Dublin, Dominican House of Studies(Studium) since 2000
- San Clemente al Laterano, Rome, owned by Irish Dominicans since 1667
- College of Corpo Santo, Lisbon, Portugal, Irish Dominican College from 1634 to 1850 (sale of the Lisbon property funded the development of St. Mary's Priory in Tallaght)
