= Newbridge College =

Private secondary school, County Kildare, Ireland

Newbridge Dominican College
- Irish: Coláiste Dhroichead Nua

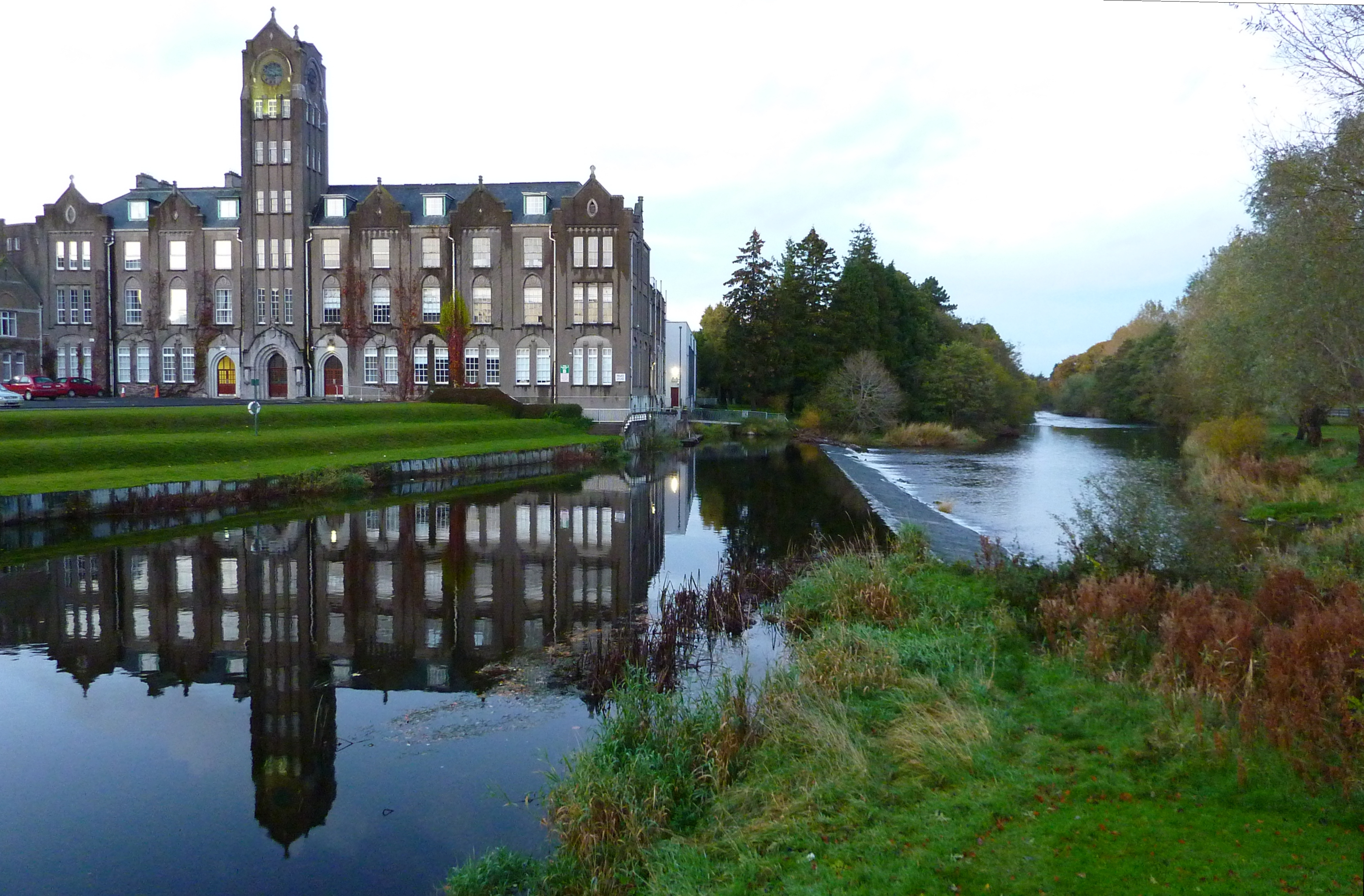
- Newbridge Dominican College and the River Liffey

Location
- Newbridge, County Kildare; Ireland; 53.1885°N 6.7931°W

Information
- Type: Private
- Motto: Latin: Veritas / Cur me Persequeris ("Truth" and "Why do you persecute me?")
- Religious affiliation: Catholicism
- Denomination: Dominican Order
- Established: 1852; 174 years ago
- Principal: Pat O'Brien
- Trustee: Fr John Harris, OP
- Staff: 97 (75 teaching staff, 22 support staff)
- Age range: 13–19
- Enrolment: 927 (2025)
Colour
- Sports: Rugby union Athletics; Equestrian sport Hockey; Canoeing
- School fees: €4,100 per annum (2017)
- Website: newbridgecollege.ie
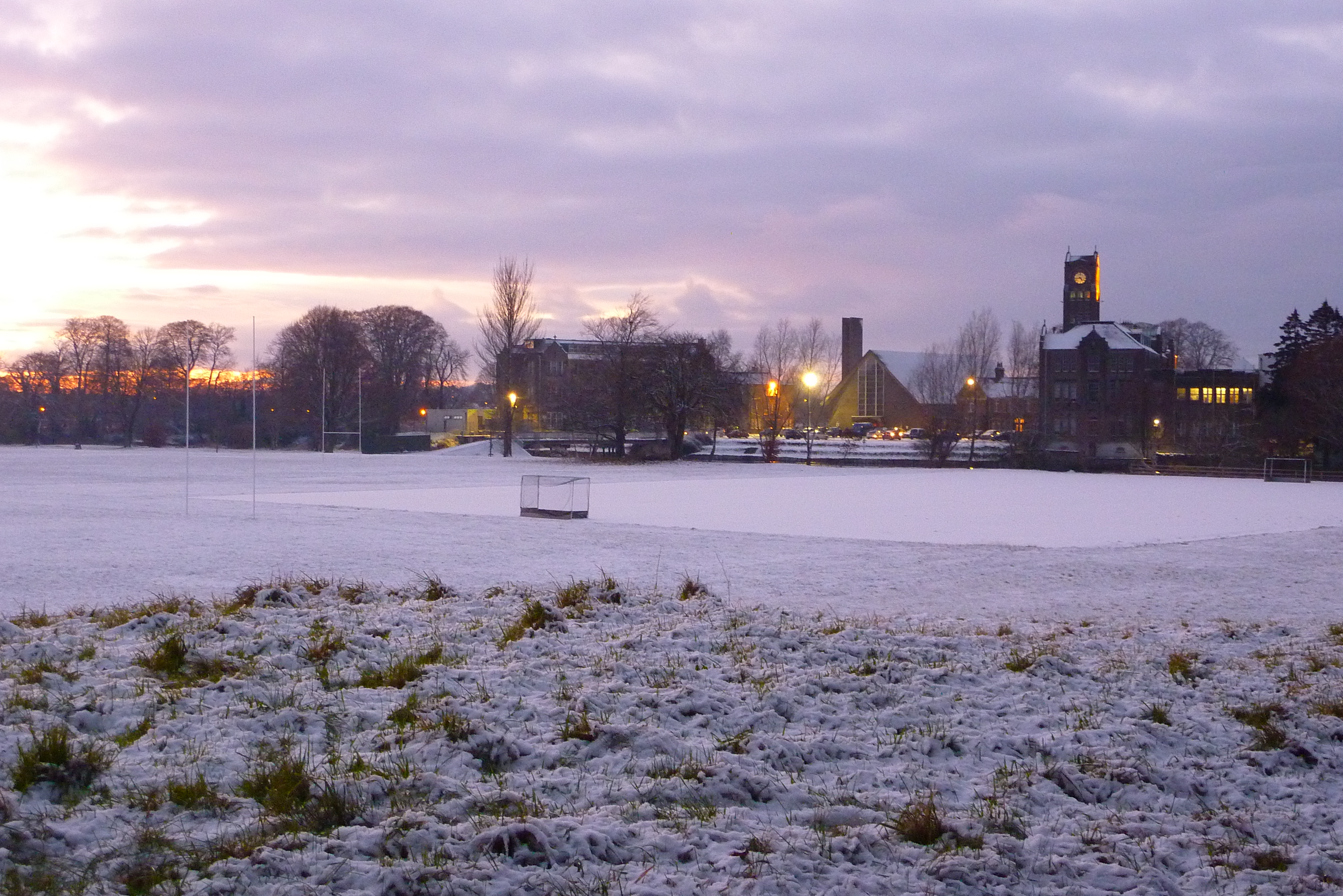
- Newbridge College skyline in winter

Newbridge College (Irish: Coláiste Dhroichead Nua), the Dominican College Newbridge, is a co-educational private fee-paying voluntary secondary school in Newbridge, County Kildare, Ireland, run by the Roman Catholic Dominican Order. The Dominican Friars founded Newbridge Dominican College in 1852 as a boarding school for boys. Today, still run by the Dominican Fathers, Newbridge College is a mixed day school with a student population of approximately 920 pupils. It is also the home of a resident community of Dominican Friars and the priory and church are centred between the two wings of the college buildings.

== History ==
=== Foundation ===
The Dominican College in Newbridge was founded in 1852 by Fr Dominic Walker OP and Fr Nicholas Freyne OP, who established the Dominican College of Saint Thomas Aquinas OP as a result of the high and increasing demand for secondary Catholic education owing to Catholic emancipation in Ireland at the time. In its first year of establishment, Newbridge College had an enrolment of 50 students. A cap was placed on the number of pupils enrolled. This restriction was lifted in 1894 and the roll grew to 100 students.

In 1870, the second church dedicated to Saint Eustace was built.

In 1924, Junior House and the Clock Tower were constructed. 1941 saw the Senior Cup Team (SCT) win the colleges' first Leinster Schools Rugby Senior Cup, trained by Fr Leahy, OP. In 1950, the Junior Cup Team (JCT) won the schools first Leinster Schools Junior Cup final. Building began for Senior House in 1951. In 1952, the college marked its centenary and events to celebrate the milestone were attended by the President of Ireland Seán T. O'Kelly, Taoiseach Éamon de Valera, the Papal Nuncio, the Master of the Dominican Order and the Bishop of Kildare and Leighlin.

The Newbridge College Past Pupils Union was established in 1937.

In 1956, with completion of Senior House and the refectory, there were almost 300 boys enrolled, 250 of whom were boarders. The third and current church was built in 1966, consecrated by Cardinal Michael Browne, OP. 1970 saw Newbridge win another Senior Cup, against Blackrock College, with a team trained by Fr John Heffernan, OP and captained by future Irish international Mick Quinn. In 1980, the bridge over the River Liffey was constructed, and the sports fields were moved from the quadrangle to the land across the river.

=== Later developments ===
In 1984, one of the most significant changes in the schools' history took place – the admission of girls to the school for the first time. Today, approximately 50% of the school's pupils are female.

April 1994 saw the opening of the new gym block, science, art and technology suites behind Junior House by the Minister for Education. An all-weather pitch used for girls hockey was also built.

The practice of boarding came to an end in 1998, and the college became a fully coeducational day school. The option for day students to get evening tea and take part in supervised study until 9.30pm started, a practice which still takes places today.

The college celebrated its 170th anniversary in 2022.

In April 2008, a new €6 million euro extension to Junior House was completed, with new science laboratories, technical and computer rooms, a new staff room and a new social area.

In 2013, an all-weather floodlit AstroTurf sports facility was commissioned at the cost of €1 million. It is used for rugby, hockey, running and other sports.

In 2018 Walker House was built, named after Fr Walker OP, the prior and one of the founders of the college.

=== Motto ===
The college coat of arms bears two mottos. Veritas (Latin for 'Truth') is the motto of the Dominican Order. Cur me persequeris ('Why do you persecute me?') is the motto of the Eustace family, who donated the land upon which the college is built. The reference is to Saint Eustace, who, while out hunting, encountered a stag with a cross between his antlers (visible in the college's arms); the stag addressed the saint in the terms of the motto. The college church is dedicated to St Eustace.

St Thomas Aquinas is the patron saint of Newbridge College.

== Location ==
The college is located north of the town of Newbridge, County Kildare. The school is situated on either side of the banks of the River Liffey, which passes through the school grounds, with a bridge connecting the college to its sports fields. Students come from the surrounding counties, including counties Wicklow, Dublin, Laois and Offaly.

== Academic ==
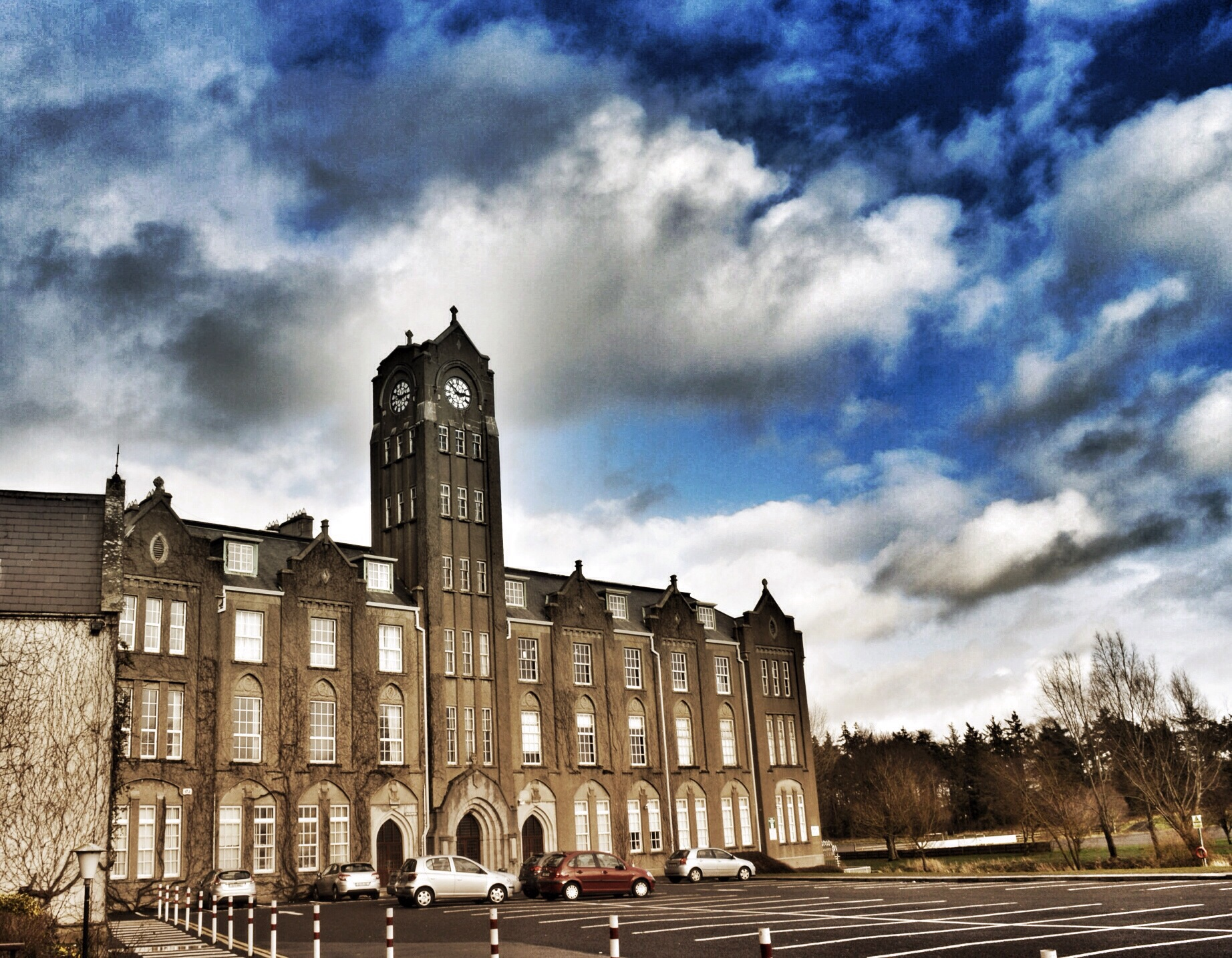
Junior House and the Clock Tower

Catering for both boys and girls, the school provides the Junior Certificate, Transition Year, Leaving Certificate, Leaving Certificate Applied and Leaving Certificate Vocational Programmes as prescribed by the Department of Education. The college follows the curricular programmes as set out by the DES in accordance with Sections 9 and 30 of the Education Act 1998.

The college performs strongly year-on-year when it comes to academic results, and has previously topped the Kildare schools league tables (and in several years has sent 100% of sixth year pupils to third level education) In 2013, the school was ranked as the second best academic performer in the province of Leinster.

Dr John Monahan, PhD, was the inaugural winner of the BT Young Scientist & Technology Exhibition, then a student of Newbridge College in 1965, he went on to establish a NASDAQ-listed biotech company in California.

=== Admissions ===
There are a limited number of places available for first years. Prospective first years must sit an entrance exam and interview with the principal before acceptance, and preference is given to those with relatives who have or are currently attending the school. The school awards two academic scholarships annually, on the basis of the results obtained in a scholarship examination. Music and sports scholarships have also been awarded.

== Sports ==
Newbridge College thrice won the Leinster Schools Rugby Senior Cup, in 1941, 1970 and 2020. In 2012, the school were victorious in the Leinster Schools Vinnie Murray Cup. They won the Leinster Schools Junior Cup final in 1950 and again in 2020, where they shared the Junior Cup with Blackrock College. The school has also made it to several finals, including both the Senior and Junior Cup finals in 1939.

Other sports are played at the school, including hockey (for girls), equestrian sport, athletics, canoeing, soccer, GAA, basketball and golf.

In Gaelic games, teams representing the school won the Leinster Colleges Senior Football Championship in 1923 and were finalists in the 1922 Leinster Colleges Senior Football Championship. In 1926, the school were finalists in the Leinster Colleges Senior Hurling Championship.

Since April 1944, the 'Triangular Sword Competition' – a format between Newbridge Dominican College, Clongowes Wood College and the Cadet School of the Defence Forces Military College – has taken place. It involves six sports: golf, Gaelic football, football, swimming, athletics and basketball.

Sports facilities at the school include an indoor gymnasium (indoor running track, basketball court, soccer), a gym equipped with weights, an outdoor running track, tennis courts, playing fields, an all-weather hockey pitch, and two floodlight artificial playing surfaces for all-weather rugby, hockey and athletics.

=== Rugby honours ===
- Leinster Schools Rugby Senior Cup – 1941, 1970, 2020 (joint winners both SCT and JCT)
- Leinster Schools Junior Cup – 1950, 2020, 2021

== Notable alumni ==
=== Government, military, legal and education ===
- David Byrne – former Attorney General of Ireland, European Commissioner, Chancellor of Dublin City University (DCU)
- Noel Lemass – former Fianna Fáil TD and Minister of State at the Department of Finance
- Michael Lynch – Irish Army officer and recipient of the Military Medal for Gallantry
- Rossa Mulcahy – Irish Army officer and Chief of Staff of the Irish Defence Forces

=== Business ===
- Myles Lee – former chief executive of CRH plc
- Feargal Quinn – founder of Superquinn and member of Seanad Éireann
- William Doyle – CEO of Newbridge Silverware
- John Monahan – Biochemist and founder of Avigen Inc

=== Clerics ===
- Bishop Derek Byrne, SPS – Bishop of Primavera do Leste–Paranatinga, Brazil (2014–present), Bishop of Guiratinga, Brazil (2008-2014)
- Fr. Wilfrid Harrington OP, Dominican theologian

=== Arts and entertainment ===
- Henry Flanagan – Dominican priest, teacher, musician and artist
- John Skehan – broadcaster
- Cyril Cusack – actor
- Christy Moore – folk singer, songwriter, and guitarist
- Dónal Lunny – folk musician and producer
- Luka Bloom – folk-rock singer-songwriter
- Barry Murphy – comedian
- Dave Allen – comedian
- Fintan Cullen – art historian
- Holt McCallany – actor
- Brendan Graham – songwriter and novelist
- Martin Gale – painter

=== Rugby union ===
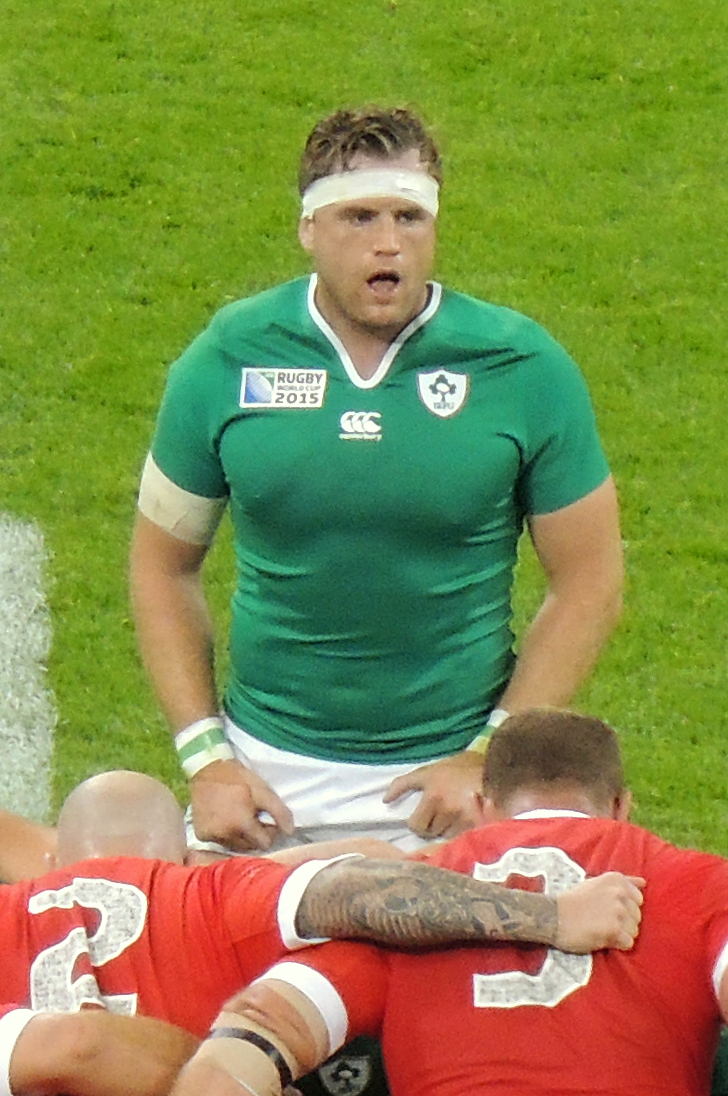
Irish international rugby player Jamie Heaslip is a past pupil of Newbridge College

- Mick Quinn – former Irish rugby union player and coach
- Mick Doyle – former Irish rugby international and coach
- Robbie McGrath – former Irish rugby international and member of the 1982 Triple Crown winning team
- Freddie McLennan – former Irish rugby international
- Fionn Carr – Connacht Rugby player
- Geordan Murphy – former Leicester Tigers and Irish rugby player
- Tony Buckley – Munster Rugby and Irish rugby player
- Johne Murphy – Munster rugby player
- John O'Sullivan – former Connacht, Munster and current SU Agen rugby player
- Bernard Jackman – former Leinster and Ireland rugby player and coach
- Tom Grace – Honorary Treasurer for the Irish Rugby Football Union (IRFU)
- James Connolly – professional rugby union player for Connacht Rugby
- James Tracy – UCD and Leinster Rugby front-row
- Sam Coghlan Murray – UCD and Nottingham RFC rugby player
- Jimmy O'Brien – Ireland national rugby sevens team player
- Jamie Heaslip – former Leinster Rugby and Ireland rugby player
- Cian Prendergast - Connacht Rugby player
- Sam Prendergast – Irish rugby union and Leinster Rugby Fly-half

=== Other sport ===
- Dermot Weld – racehorse trainer
- Aubrey Brabazon – horse racing jockey and Cheltenham winner
- Louise Quinn – Irish women's senior international soccer player
- Helen Kearney - Paralympic dressage rider with 3 medals from the 2012 London Paralympics and 2016 Rio Paralympics
