= Michael Monaghan (bishop) =

- Bishop of Roseau
- Church: Catholic Church
- Diocese: Diocese of Roseau
- In office: 30 April 1850 – 14 July 1855
- Predecessor: Diocese erected
- Successor: Désiré-Michel Vesque
- Other post: Apostolic Administrator of Port of Spain (1852-1855)

Orders
- Consecration: 16 February 1851 by Richard Patrick Smith

Personal details
- Born: 1812 Ardagh, County Longford, United Kingdom of Great Britain and Ireland
- Died: 14 July 1855 (aged 42–43) Saint Thomas, Danish West Indies, Danish Empire

Michael Monaghan (born 1812 in Ardagh, County Longford; died 14 July 1855) was an Irish clergyman and bishop for the Roman Catholic Diocese of Roseau, Dominica. He was appointed bishop in 1851. Educated for the priesthood at St. Patrick's College, Maynooth. He was ordained a bishop in 1852 by fellow Ardagh man, Bishiop of Port of Spain Richard Patrick Smith. He died in 1855.

Bishop Monaghans brother Thomas also studied at Maynooth College and became a priest, serving in Drumshambo, Co. Leitrim.
