= Sufetula =

Sufetula may refer to:

places and jurisdictions

- an ancient city, whose Roman ruins are in the archaeological site of Sbeitla, in modern Tunisia
- its former Roman diocese Sufetula (see), now a Catholic titular bishopric

biology

- Sufetula (moth), a moth genus
