= Edward Joseph Gilbert =

American-born bishop (1936–2025)

The Most Reverend Edward J. Gilbert, C.Ss.R., JCD
- Archbishop Emeritus of Port of Spain
- Church: Catholic Church
- See: Archdiocese of Port of Spain
- In office: March 21, 2001 – December 26, 2011
- Predecessor: Gordon Anthony Pantin, C.S.Sp.
- Successor: Joseph Everard Harris, C.S.Sp
- Previous post: Bishop of Roseau (1994–2001)

Orders
- Ordination: June 21, 1964 by Francis Spellman
- Consecration: September 7, 1994 by Kelvin Edward Felix, Ronald Gerard Connors and Pastor Cuquejo

Personal details
- Born: December 26, 1936 New York City, U.S.
- Died: October 15, 2025 (aged 88) New Smyrna Beach, Florida, U.S.

Ordination history of Edward Joseph Gilbert
History
Episcopal consecration
- Consecrated by: Kelvin Edward Felix
Episcopal succession
Bishops consecrated by Edward Joseph Gilbert as principal consecrator
- Francis Dean Alleyne, O.S.B.: January 30, 2004
- Joseph Everard Harris, C.S.Sp: September 14, 2011
- Charles Jason Gordon: September 21, 2011

Edward Joseph Gilbert (December 26, 1936 – October 15, 2025) was an American-born bishop of the Catholic Church in the Antilles. He served as bishop of the Diocese of Roseau in Dominica, from 1994 to 2001. He was the Archbishop of Port of Spain, Trinidad and Tobago between 2001 and 2011.

== Biography ==
=== Early life and ministry ===
Gilbert was born in Brooklyn, New York, on December 26, 1936. He professed religious vows in the Congregation of the Most Holy Redeemer (Redemptorists) on August 2, 1959. He studied for the priesthood at St Mary's College Seminary, North East, Pennsylvania and Mount St. Alphonsus Seminary in Esopus, New York.

He was ordained a priest on June 21, 1964. He earned a Doctor of Canon Law degree from The Catholic University of America in Washington, D.C. From 1968–69 he was involved in parish ministry in Brooklyn. He was assigned to the faculty at Mount St. Alphonsus Seminary from 1970–1984. He served as professor of Canon Law for 14 years, academic dean for six years and the seminary rector for six years. In 1984, he was elected the Provincial Superior of the Baltimore Province, a position he held until he was named bishop.

=== Bishop of Roseau ===
On July 1, 1994, John Paul II named him the eighth bishop of the Diocese of Roseau. He was consecrated by Archbishop Kelvin Edward Felix of Castries on September 7, 1994. The principal co-consecrators were Bishops Ronald Gerard Connors, C.Ss.R. of San Juan de la Maguana and Pastor Cuquejo, C.Ss.R. of the Military Ordinariate of Paraguay. During his six years in Roseau Bishop Gilbert worked to reorganize the diocese. He inaugurated the Diocesan Synod, which involved the clergy, religious and laity in all its aspects. All areas of church life were studied and four areas were selected for on-going pastoral care: family life, youth, training and finances. Gilbert promoted vocations to the priesthood and religious life. He modernized church structures, which included the appointment of the first woman to be the chancellor of the diocese. He also created the Dominica Catholic, a quarterly diocesan newspaper.

=== Archbishop of Port of Spain ===
John Paul II named Bishop Gilbert the 11th archbishop of Port of Spain on March 21, 2001. He was installed in Port of Spain on May 5, 2001. Archbishop Gilbert served the archdiocese for eleven years until his resignation was accepted by Pope Benedict XVI on December 26, 2011.

=== Death ===
Gilbert died in New Smyrna Beach, Florida, on October 15, 2025, at the age of 88.

Catholic Church titles
Preceded by Gordon Anthony Pantin, C.S.Sp	Archbishop of Port of Spain; 2001–2011	Succeeded by Joseph Everard Harris, C.S.Sp
Preceded by Arnold Boghaert, C.Ss.R.	Bishop of Roseau; 1994–2001	Succeeded by Gabriel Malzaire
