= Esker Friary =

Coordinates: 53.2823°N 8.6821°W

Esker Friary was a monastery established by the Dominican Friars – Regular Observance.

== Dominicans ==
It was founded originally after 1622, on a site granted by Ulick Burke, 1st Marquess of Clanricarde, at the request of the Provincial, Fr Ross Mageoghegan, and other friars. As other Catholic entities it suffered during the Penal Laws. In 1715 a new monastery was established (the site of the exiting monastery). Esker was used at various times as a Novitiate and for formation of members of the order, where students would study philosophy. The friary established St. Dominic's College to educate students for professions. A chapel dedicated to Saint Peter and Saint Paul was built in 1844. In 1857 the friary became the main novitiate of the order in Ireland, ceasing as a novitiate in 1889. The Dominican friars left Esker in the late 19th century, handing the convent over to the Diocese of Clonfert in 1893, who used it for a short time for clerical training.

== Redemptorists – St. Patrick's Monastery ==
The Redemptorists obtained the monastery from the diocese in 1901. The Redemptorists used Esker as a novitiate, with members going on to take degrees in University College Galway. It was announced the order were ceasing their mission in Esker in 2022.

St Dominics Holy Well is situated in the grounds of the monastery.

== People associated with Esker Friary ==
- Anthony Caffry OP, founder and first pastor of St. Patrick's Washington, USA
- Anthony Dominic Fahy, missionary to Argentina, professed in Esker.
- Patrick Vincent Flood, DD, OP, (1844–1907), served as Archbishop of Port of Spain, Trinidad (1889–1907).
- Damien Smith OP, a native of Galway, served as Prior of Esker and Provincial of Irish Province (1832–1836) and was instrumental in providing education to all classes from Esker.
