= The Chronicle (Dominica) =

- Type: Weekly newspaper (published every Friday)
- Founded: 1909
- Price: EC$1.50

The Chronicle is the national newspaper of the Caribbean island nation of Dominica. It was begun by Bishop Philip Schelfhaut in 1909 as the Dominica Chronicle, a bi-weekly publication. For many years afterward, it was known as The New Chronicle until it dropped the "New" from its title in 1996.
