= Cathedral of the Immaculate Conception (Port of Spain) =

Cathedral Basilica of the Immaculate Conception
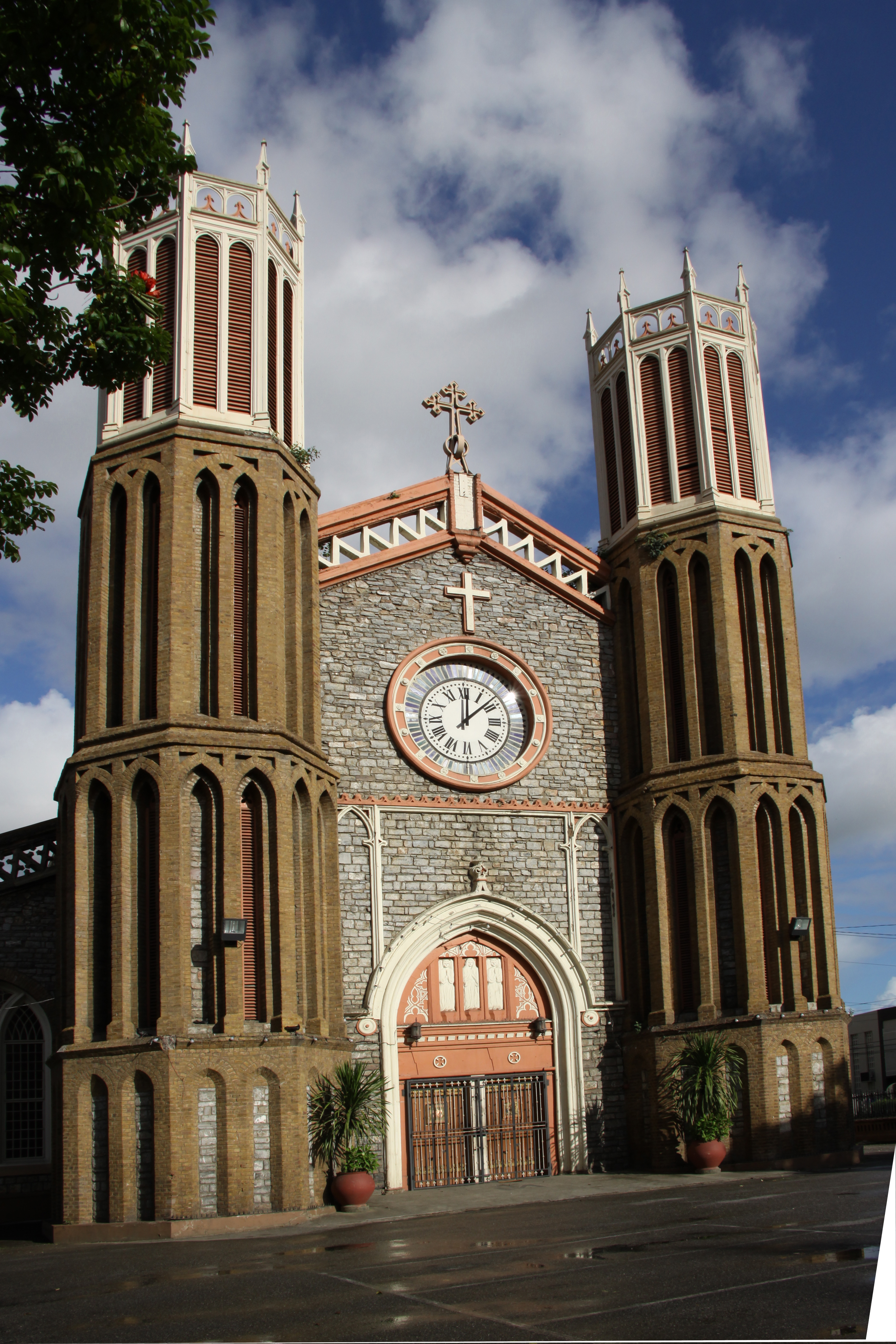
- Cathedral Basilica of the Immaculate Conception, Port of Spain

- Location in Trinidad and Tobago
- 10°39′00″N 61°30′24″W
- Location: 31 Independence Square; Port of Spain
- Country: Trinidad and Tobago
- Denomination: Roman Catholic Church

Architecture
- Style: Gothic Revival
- Groundbreaking: 1816
- Completed: 1851

Administration
- Archdiocese: Port of Spain

Clergy
- Bishop: Most Rev. Charles Jason Gordon
- Vicar: Fr Martin Sirju

The Cathedral of the Immaculate Conception is a Catholic cathedral in Port of Spain, Trinidad and Tobago. It is the seat of the Archdiocese of Port of Spain. Construction started in 1816 and it was completed in 1851. The same year the cathedral was given the honorary status of a minor basilica.

== History ==
The first Catholic Church in Port of Spain was built in 1781 by the Spanish governor Martin de Salverria on the site that is now known as Tamarind Square.The English governor Sir Ralph Woodford decided to build a church better suited to the growing and predominantly Catholic population. Plans were drawn by the governor’s secretary, Phillip Renagle, and the foundation stone was laid on 24 March 1816. The building was laid out in the shape of a Latin cross and built of blue metal from the Laventille quarries, with iron framework from England for the doors and windows. Dr James Buckley, Vicar Apostolic to the Holy See, arrived in Trinidad in March 1820 and the church became a Cathedral. Completed in 1832, the Cathedral would be consecrated in 1849 after all the debts had been paid. In 1851 Pope Pius IX declared that the cathedral was to rank as a Minor Basilica. On 2 September the twin towers, originally built of stone, were destroyed by an earthquake and rebuilt in wood as they are today. The towers contain twelve bells and a clock, added in 1879.
