= Sbeitla =

Sbeitla سبيطلة Sufetula
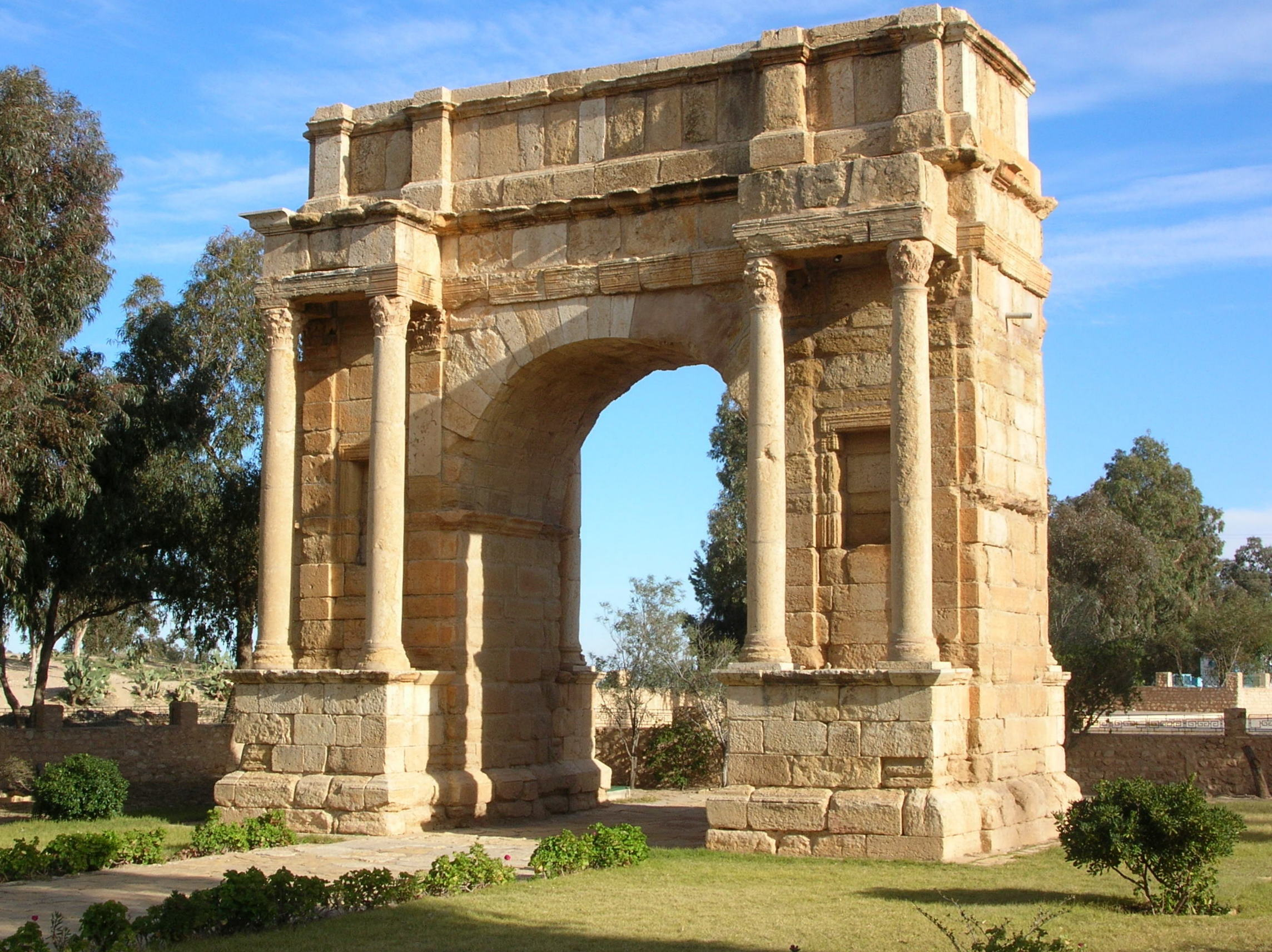
- Arch of Diocletian

- Location in Tunisia
- Coordinates: 35°13′47″N 9°7′46″E
- Country: Tunisia
- Governorate: Kasserine Governorate
- Delegation: Sbeitla
- Municipality: 1927

Area
  - Total: 221.47 km^{2} (85.51 sq mi)

Population (2024)
  - Total: 42,359
  - Density: 191.26/km^{2} (495.37/sq mi)
- Time zone: UTC+1 (CET)
- Postal code: 1250

Sbeitla (Arabic: سبيطلة Sbaytlā; medieval Arabic Subayṭila), known in antiquity as Sufetula, is a town in west-central Tunisia, in the Kasserine Governorate. It is the seat of the governorate's largest delegation, covering 1,133.5 km^{2} (437.6 sq mi), and the municipality had 42,359 inhabitants at the 2024 census.

Next to the modern town lie the ruins of Sufetula, whose three Capitoline temples are among the best-preserved Roman forum temples in North Africa; the site has been on Tunisia's UNESCO tentative list since 2021. In 647 the town was the site of the Battle of Sufetula, the first major engagement of the Muslim conquest of the Maghreb. In February 1943 it was fought over during the Battle of Sidi Bou Zid and served as a staging point for the Axis offensive towards the Kasserine Pass.

In the 1830s the hills around Sbeitla were described as "clothed with the juniper, the cistus, and the pine", whereas Norman Douglas, in Fountains in the Sand (1912), found them "bleak and bare".

== History ==
=== Antiquity ===
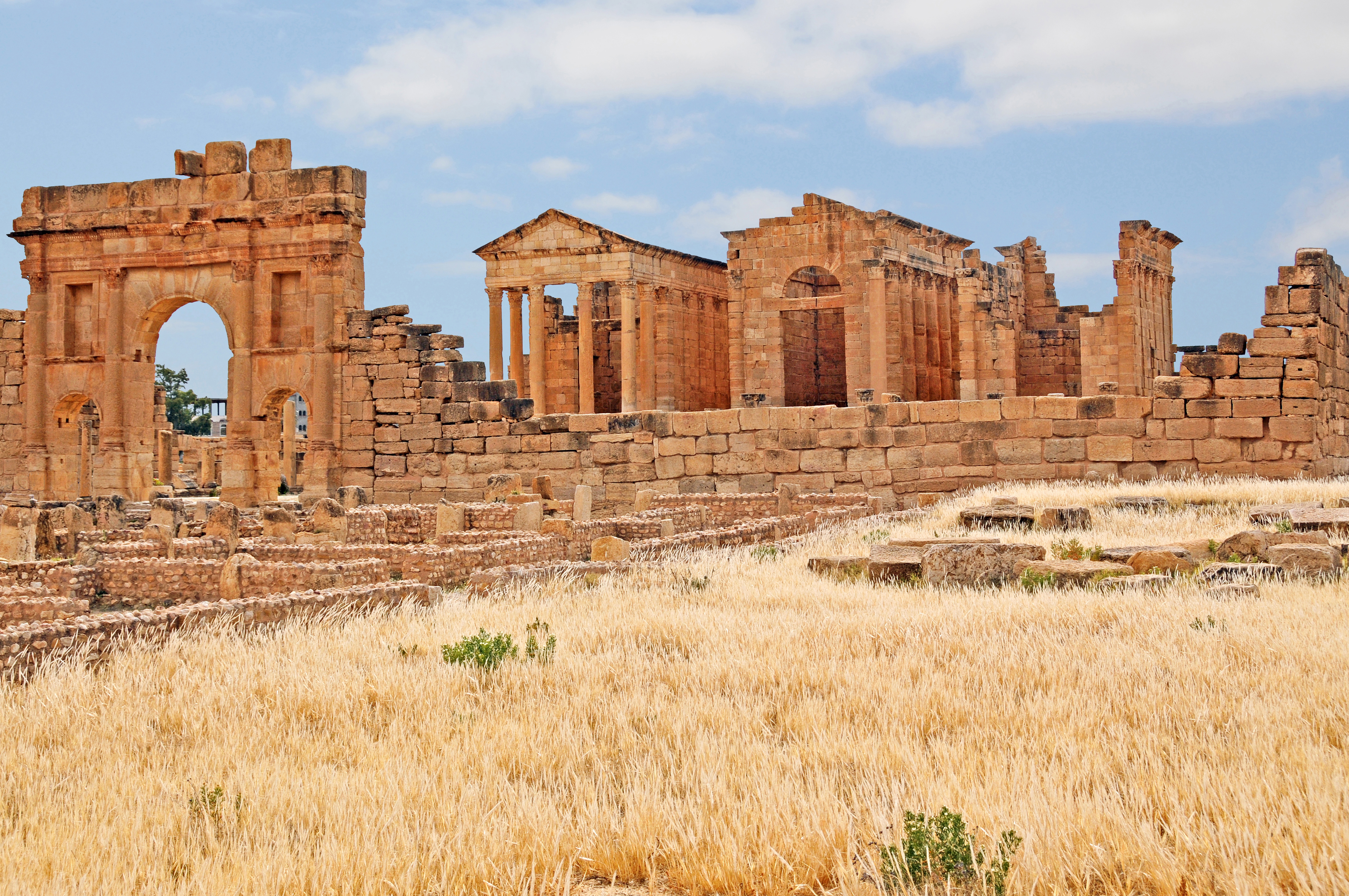
The Gate of Antoninus Pius, entrance to the forum

Little is known of the area before the Roman period. Finds from the region include funerary stelae, some inscribed in the Libyco-Berber alphabet, and dolmens attributed to the pre-Roman Numidian and Libyan populations of the High Steppe. In the early 1st century AD the region was home to semi-nomadic tribes such as the Musulamii and the Musunii Regiani, and was shaken by the revolt of Tacfarinas (AD 17–24); according to Encyclopædia Britannica, Sufetula probably began as a military post during the campaigns against him.

The Roman town of Sufetula Musuniorum ("Sufetula of the Musunii") was founded in the third quarter of the 1st century AD, under the Flavians, on a plateau in a bend of the Sbeitla wadi, just below an abundant perennial spring whose water was carried into the town by a bridge-aqueduct. According to the Tunisian nomination file, it is the only known example in the Roman Empire of a town founded on the colonial model not to settle Roman citizens, but to sedentarise an indigenous tribe, the Musunii, who were still largely nomadic.

The Musunii Regiani are known from Pliny the Elder's list of African peoples, from imperial dedications found between Cillium (Kasserine) and Thelepte, and from boundary markers found around Sufetula. Ali Chérif has argued that these markers record a boundary between the territory of the town, founded as a Latin municipium on Musunian land, and neighbouring private estates, rather than a grant of land to the tribe. Britannica dates the grant of municipal status to Vespasian (69–79) and the promotion to colonia to Marcus Aurelius or Commodus, but the epigraphic evidence for these dates is considered inconclusive.

The town prospered in the 2nd century through olive oil production, as shown by the olive presses found in the ruins, and this wealth financed its forum and public buildings. The forum is entered through a gate dedicated to Antoninus Pius and is dominated by three separate temples standing side by side, generally interpreted as a Capitolium for the Capitoline Triad, an unusual arrangement in the Roman world. At the south-east entrance to the town, on the road to Hadrumetum (Sousse), stands an arch dedicated to the emperors of the first Tetrarchy around AD 300; Diocletian's name was later hammered out of its dedication. The arch was restored in 1910–1911. In the 4th century the town received monumental fountains, including a large courtyard fountain, fed by the aqueduct.

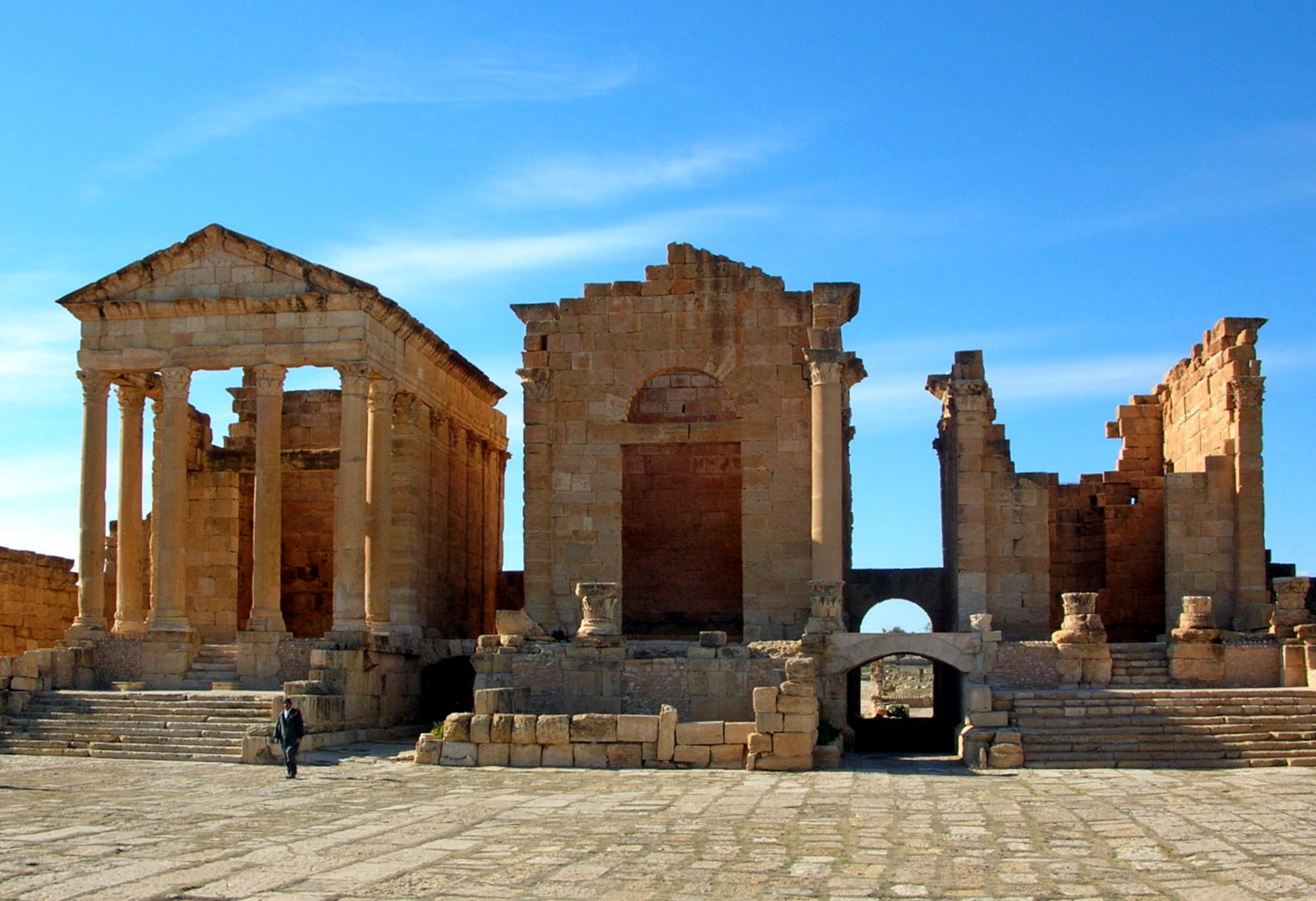
The Capitoline temples of Minerva, Jupiter and Juno

Gate of Antoninus Pius and a Roman street

The theatre above the wadi

The Roman bridge-aqueduct

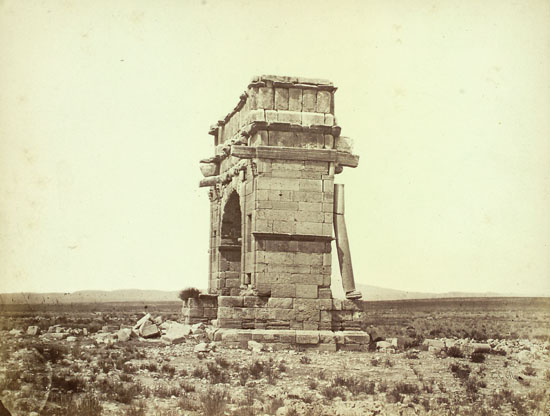
The Arch of the Tetrarchy in 1875, before its restoration

=== Christianity and late antiquity ===
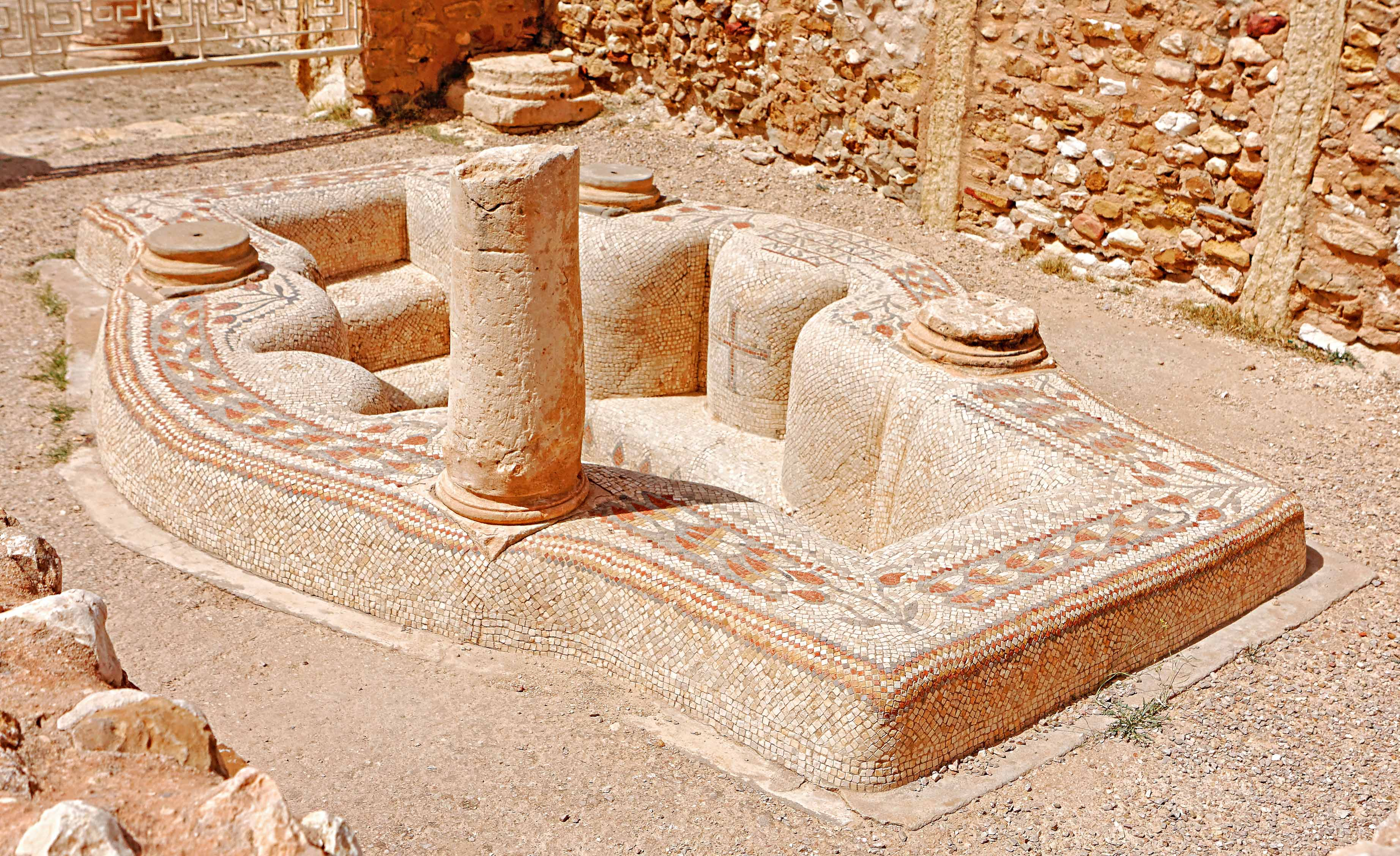
Mosaic baptismal font of the Church of Vitalis

With the spread of Christianity, Sufetula became a bishopric of the province of Byzacena. Three of its bishops are known: Privatianus, at the Council of Carthage of 255; Jucundus, at the councils of 411 and 419; and Saint Praesidius, scourged and exiled in 484 by the Vandal king Huneric. The town has several churches of the late Roman and Byzantine periods, including the Basilica of Vitalis and its mosaic baptistery. In the 6th century the font of the baptistery between the two cathedral churches was filled in, apparently to house the relics of Bishop Jucundus, and the church of the priest Servus was built inside the courtyard of an earlier pagan sanctuary. Although the Vandal rulers (439–533) were Arian Christians, no monument at Sufetula can be securely dated to the Vandal period.

=== Byzantine period and the Battle of Sufetula ===
After the Byzantine reconquest of 533, Sufetula became an important stronghold. It was refortified piecemeal rather than enclosed by a single wall: several small forts and fortified houses were built along the main street, and two olive presses, which still keep their uprights, counterweights and basins, were set up across a paved street. In the 640s, the exarch Gregory the Patrician broke with Constantinople, proclaimed himself emperor and made Sufetula his residence.

In 647, under Caliph Uthman ibn Affan, an Arab army led by Abdallah ibn Sa'd met Gregory's Byzantine and Berber forces before the town. Gregory was killed, and the town was taken and sacked. Muslim chroniclers call this campaign the "Conquest of the Seven Abdallahs", after seven companions said to have taken part, among them Abd Allah ibn al-Zubayr, to whom tradition attributes Gregory's death. Some Syriac sources claim instead that Gregory survived and fled to Constantinople, but most historians accept the Arab account of his death in battle. The defeat fatally undermined Byzantine rule in Africa and opened the way to the Muslim conquest of the Maghreb. The Muslim conquest also ended the diocese of Sufetula, which survives as a Catholic titular see; since 2023 its titular bishop has been Juarez Albino Destro, auxiliary bishop of Porto Alegre.

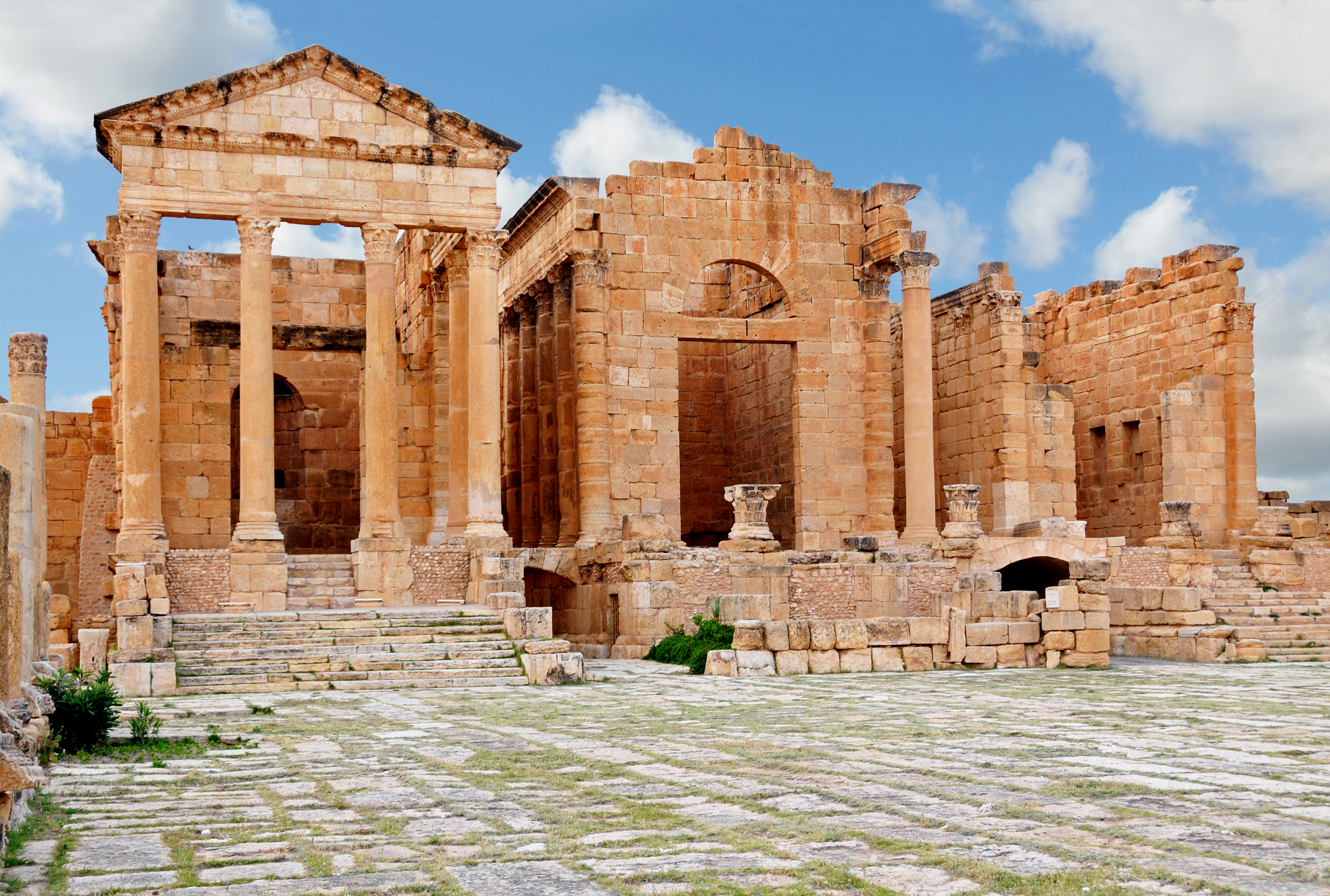
Capitoline temples

The temples in an 1887 engraving

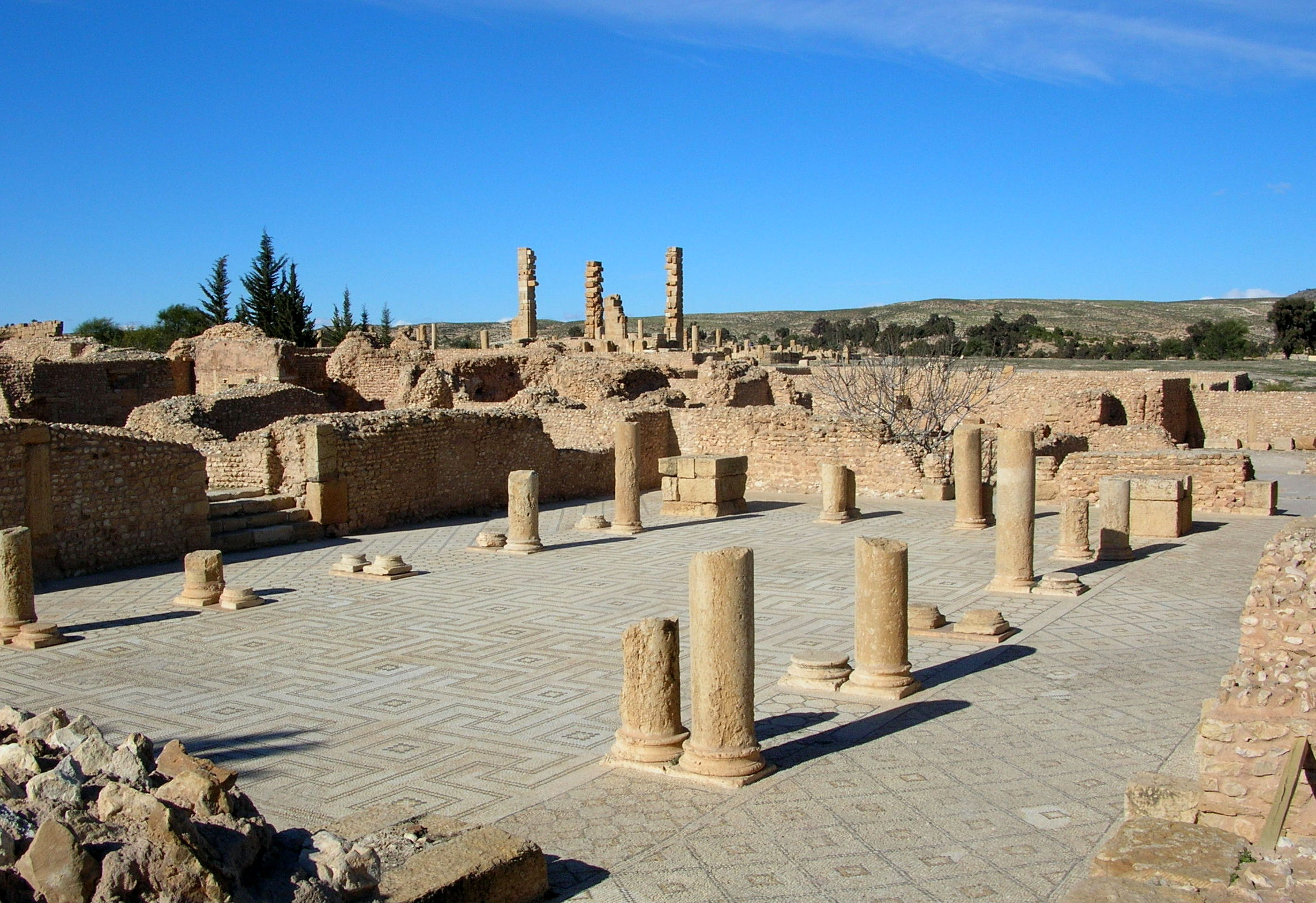
Public baths

Basilica of Vitalis

Mosaic floor of the Church of Vitalis

Church of Servus

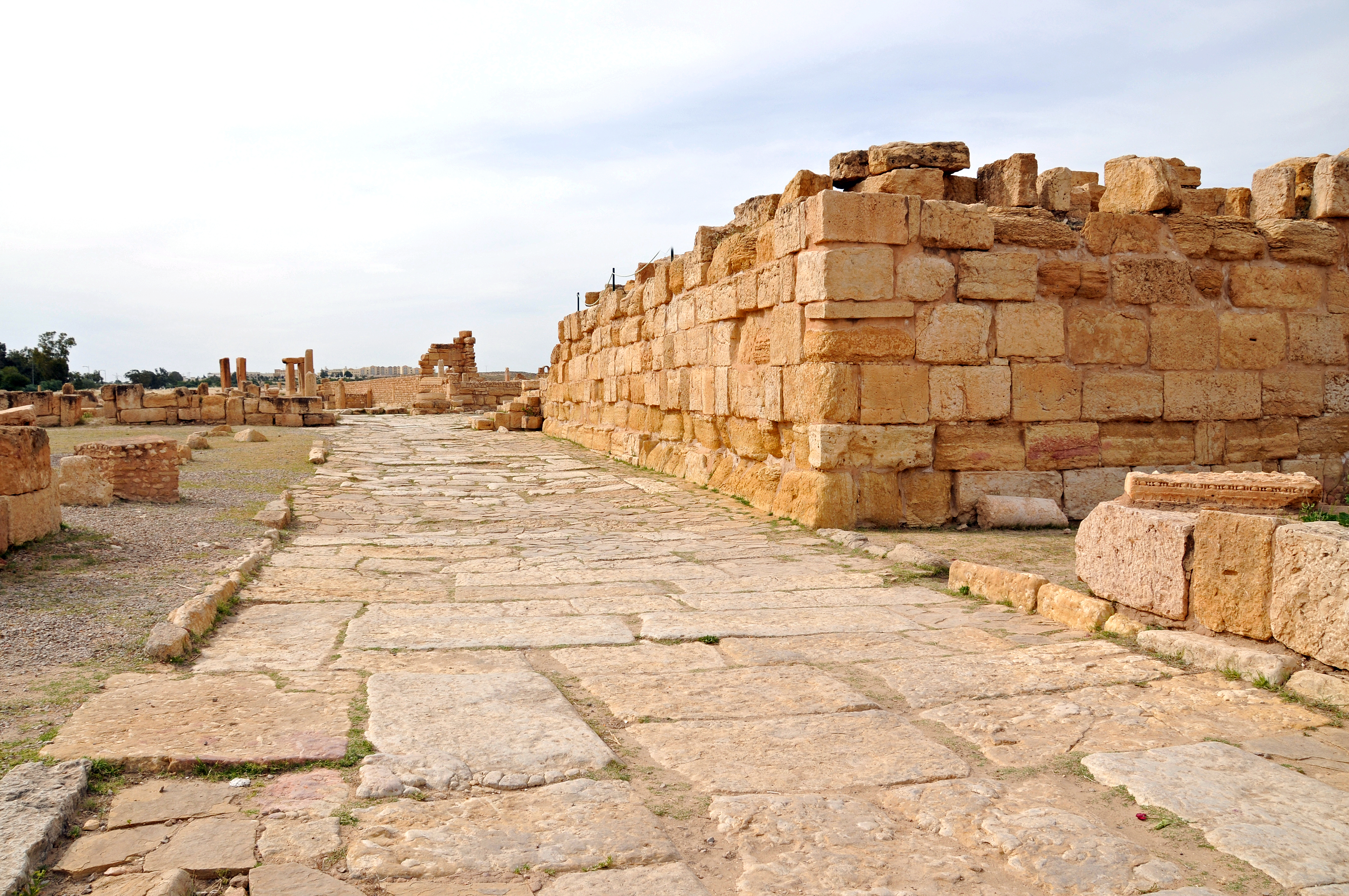
Small Byzantine fort

Byzantine-era olive press

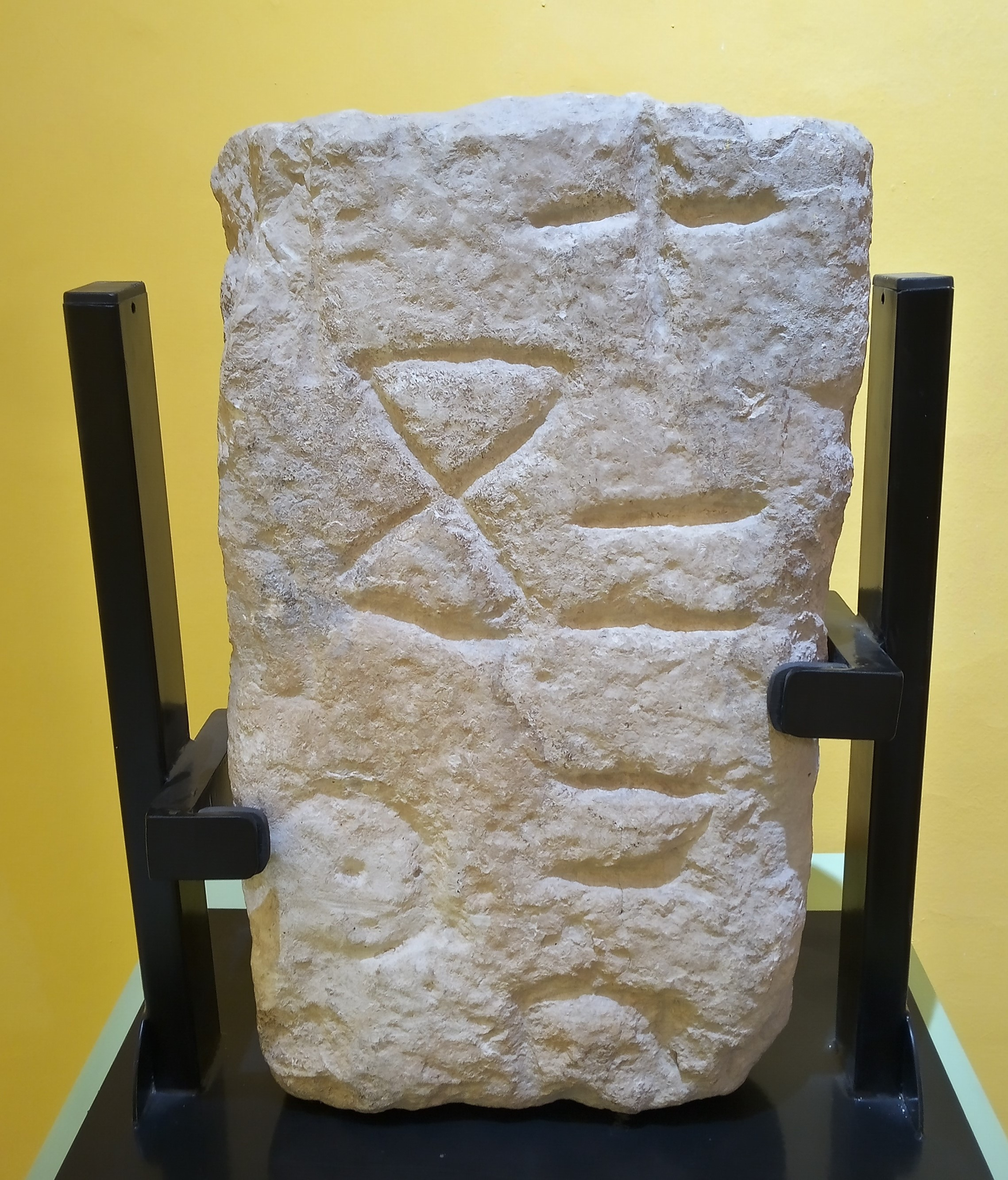
Libyco-Berber funerary stele, Sbeitla Museum

=== Early Islamic and medieval period ===
The battle of 647 did not end urban life at Sufetula. Drawing on Duval's excavations, Corisande Fenwick notes that eight churches were in use in the 7th century, none of which shows signs of sudden destruction after the Arab conquest; some were converted to other uses, while at least two remained in use into the 10th century. According to the National Heritage Institute, some quarters were still inhabited in the 11th century, although the early medieval town remains poorly understood. In Arabic sources the town is called Subayṭila; the Encyclopaedia of Islam places it at over 450 m altitude, near abundant springs, at a crossroads between the north, west and south of the country. Medieval Arab geographers, notably al-Bakri, associated its ruins with Gregory the Patrician.

=== Beylical period (18th–19th centuries) ===
Ruins of Sbeitlah, the ancient Sufetula, engraving after Charles Bentley, 1838

In the 18th century the Fraichich and Majer tribal confederations were governed by a single caïd who resided at Sbeitla; after the Algerian–Tunisian treaty of 1821 the two groups were separated and divided into several fractions. Both took the lead of the revolt of 1864.

The ruins attracted European travellers from the 18th century onward. Thomas Shaw described "Spaitla" in 1738 as one of the most remarkable places in Barbary for the extent and magnificence of its ruins. James Bruce spent eight days at the site in late 1765 and drew the temples, camping inside the walled precinct after his party was harassed by a raiding tribe. The British consul-general Robert Lambert Playfair retraced Bruce's route and published his drawings of the temples in 1877. An engraving after Charles Bentley was published in Fisher's Drawing Room Scrap Book for 1838 with a poem by Letitia Elizabeth Landon, "Death of the Lion among the Ruins of Sbeitlah". Ali Ben Ghedhahem, leader of the Mejba Revolt of 1864 against the doubling of the poll tax (mejba), was born in Sbeitla in 1814; his father was qadi of the Majer tribe. A seal of his dated 1864 is kept at the Higher Institute for the History of Contemporary Tunisia (University of Manouba).

=== French protectorate ===
In mid-August 1881, shortly after the establishment of the French protectorate, insurgents from the Hamama, Fraichich, Majer, Ouled Ayar, Ouartane, Zeghalma and Ounifa tribes met at Sbeitla to decide how to respond to the French advance. Under the protectorate a European settlement grew up beside the ruins; the railway arrived in 1908 (see Transport) and the municipality was created in 1927. The town had a Catholic church, built in 1928, and a synagogue, recorded as disused in the 2010 national inventory of Tunisian synagogues. A hospital opened in 1934, giving its name to the Homet Sbitar quarter.

=== Second World War ===
During the Tunisian campaign, Sbeitla was held by the US II Corps. After the Axis victory at Sidi Bou Zid (Operation Frühlingswind), the German 10th and 21st Panzer Divisions attacked the town on 16 February 1943; the US 1st Armored Division held it until the next day, then withdrew on 17 February on Lloyd Fredendall's orders. According to the US Army official history, German fire into the olive groves east of the town on the night of 16–17 February caused part of Combat Command A to retreat in disorder, while American engineers blew up the water-pumping station, an ammunition dump and the railway bridge; on 17 February Combat Command B, dug in along a wadi south of the town, checked a German armoured attack before withdrawing towards Kasserine, and the 21st Panzer Division entered Sbeitla the same day.

The town then became a staging point for Rommel's offensive towards the Western Dorsal: on 19 February the 21st Panzer Division advanced from Sbeitla towards Sbiba, where it was stopped, and the 10th Panzer Division was sent through Sbeitla to join the attack at the Kasserine Pass. After the Axis offensive was halted, the Allies found the Kasserine Pass clear of the enemy on 25 February. By 10 March the US 33rd Fighter Group was flying from airfields at Sbeitla, which remained an Allied air base until mid-April. During the war, families from Sousse took refuge in the Boukh'il quarter.

=== Since independence ===
Under the 1964 modus vivendi between Tunisia and the Holy See, the Catholic Church ceded 107 chapels and churches, 47 presbyteries and 900 hectares of land to the Tunisian state; the Sbeitla church was later demolished. The last French residents of the station quarter left in 1964.

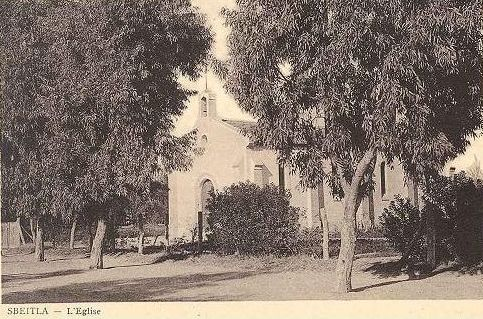
The Catholic church of Sbeitla, built in 1928

== Geography ==
Panoramic view of Sbeitla

Sbeitla is located in the semi-arid High Steppes of west-central Tunisia. By road it is 33 km (21 mi) north-east of Kasserine, 246 km (153 mi) south-west of Tunis and 166 km (103 mi) south-west of Sousse. The municipality, created in 1927, covers 22,147 hectares. Since the 2016 municipal reform it has also included the surrounding rural areas, and it is divided into five sectors: El Ksar, El Khadhra, El Athar, Sbeitla-Ville and Cité Essourour.

=== Climate ===
The climate is semi-arid, with an average annual rainfall of about 300 mm and potential evapotranspiration of about 1,450 mm a year; temperatures range from about 4 °C in winter to 45 °C in summer.

=== Water ===
The Sbeitla wadi in an 1887 engraving

The town lies on the Sbeitla wadi, called the Oued Rmel in its upper course, a major tributary of the Oued Zeroud that rises on the slopes of Jebel Semmama. Its basin covers about 590 km². The multi-layered Sbeitla aquifer is one of the most productive in central Tunisia, and its good-quality water is used for irrigation and drinking. Since the early 20th century, the springs of Sbeitla have supplied drinking water to Sfax through a pipeline of about 180 km; a second pipeline, laid in 1978, carries water from 21 boreholes in west-central Tunisia.

== Administration ==
Sbeitla is the seat of a delegation of Kasserine Governorate and of a municipality. Decree no. 2023-9 of 8 March 2023 dissolved all Tunisian municipal councils pending new elections; since then each municipality's secretary-general has handled routine business under the governor's authority.

== Demographics ==
The population of Sbeitla delegation nearly doubled between 1975 and 2014:

Population of Sbeitla delegation
1975	1984	1994	2004	2014
38,051	48,536	64,543	69,539	75,245

Within its current boundaries, the municipality had 32,212 inhabitants in 2004, 36,388 in 2014 and 42,359 at the census of 6 November 2024. Like the rest of west-central Tunisia, the town experiences strong emigration towards the coast: according to the National Institute of Statistics, about 2,000 people leave Sbeitla every year.

=== Neighbourhoods ===
A 2021 migration profile of the municipality, based on surveys and workshops with residents, traces the origins of Sbeitla's neighbourhoods. Some, such as Boukh'il, Hrahra and Abadlia, predate the French protectorate. Hadra was laid out around 1880 as an extension for French settlers, and the station district (Cité Mahata) grew up around the railway from about 1900; Libyan families fleeing insecurity settled there in 1908, and the last French residents left in 1964. The weekly market gave its name to Houmet Essouk, where shopkeepers from the Jerid, Sfax, the Sahel and Djerba settled, and the hospital opened in 1934 gave its name to Homet Sbitar, which attracted French, Italian, Spanish, Libyan and Algerian immigrants during the colonial period.

The town also became a place of refuge. Land near the ruins, granted around 1900 to an exile from Algeria, became the "Algerians'" quarter, where families from Biskra settled from 1942 until their return to Algeria in 1960; Boukh'il received refugees from Sousse during the Second World War, and the name of Malaji (now Sourour Est) means "the refugees". After independence, new districts grew around public services, such as Maahed around the mixed secondary school opened in 1967, while floods in 1969 pushed residents of low-lying areas towards the new Essourour district.

== Archaeology and heritage ==
The forum and the three Capitoline temples

The site of Sufetula includes a forum dominated by three separate Capitoline temples, baths, a theatre and several Byzantine churches. Tunisia added it to its UNESCO tentative list on 15 April 2021 under criterion (ii).

The first scientific exploration came with Gustav Wilmanns around 1873, then René Cagnat and Henri Saladin in 1883; major excavations were carried out in 1921 by Louis Poinssot and Raymond Lantier. Noël Duval excavated from 1954 to 1963, with support from the French CNRS, concentrating on the episcopal group; with François Baratte he published a general guide to the ruins in 1973. His results on Church V, dedicated to Saints Gervasius and Protasius and Tryphon, were published in 1999; the National Heritage Institute describes it as the latest church in the town, still in use in the 11th century.

Since 2022, a Tunisian–French mission led by Mohamed Ben Nejma (National Heritage Institute) and Nicolas Lamare (University of Picardy Jules Verne), with support from the École française de Rome, has been studying the town's urban development; magnetic survey has revealed previously unknown streets and buildings.

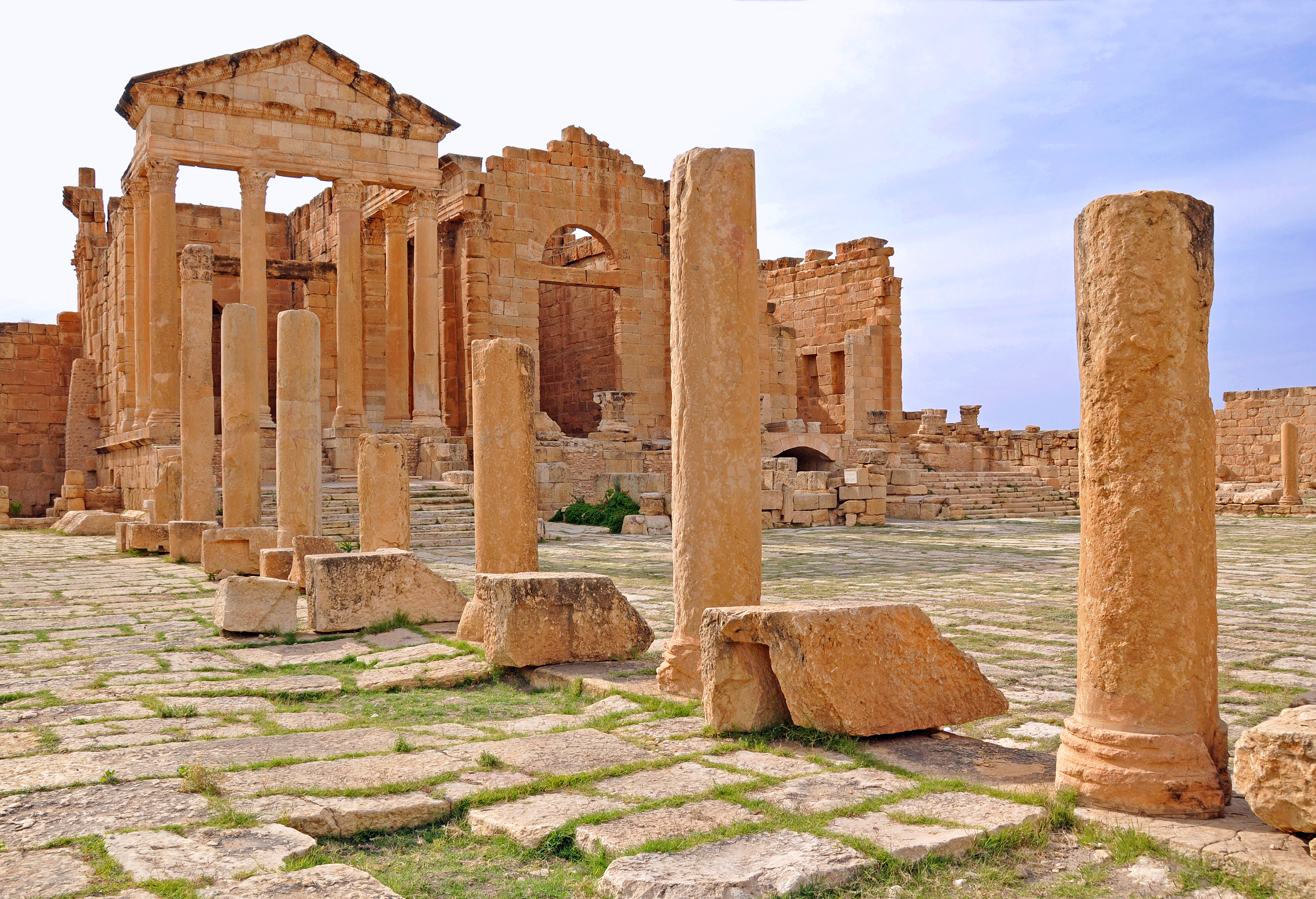
The forum

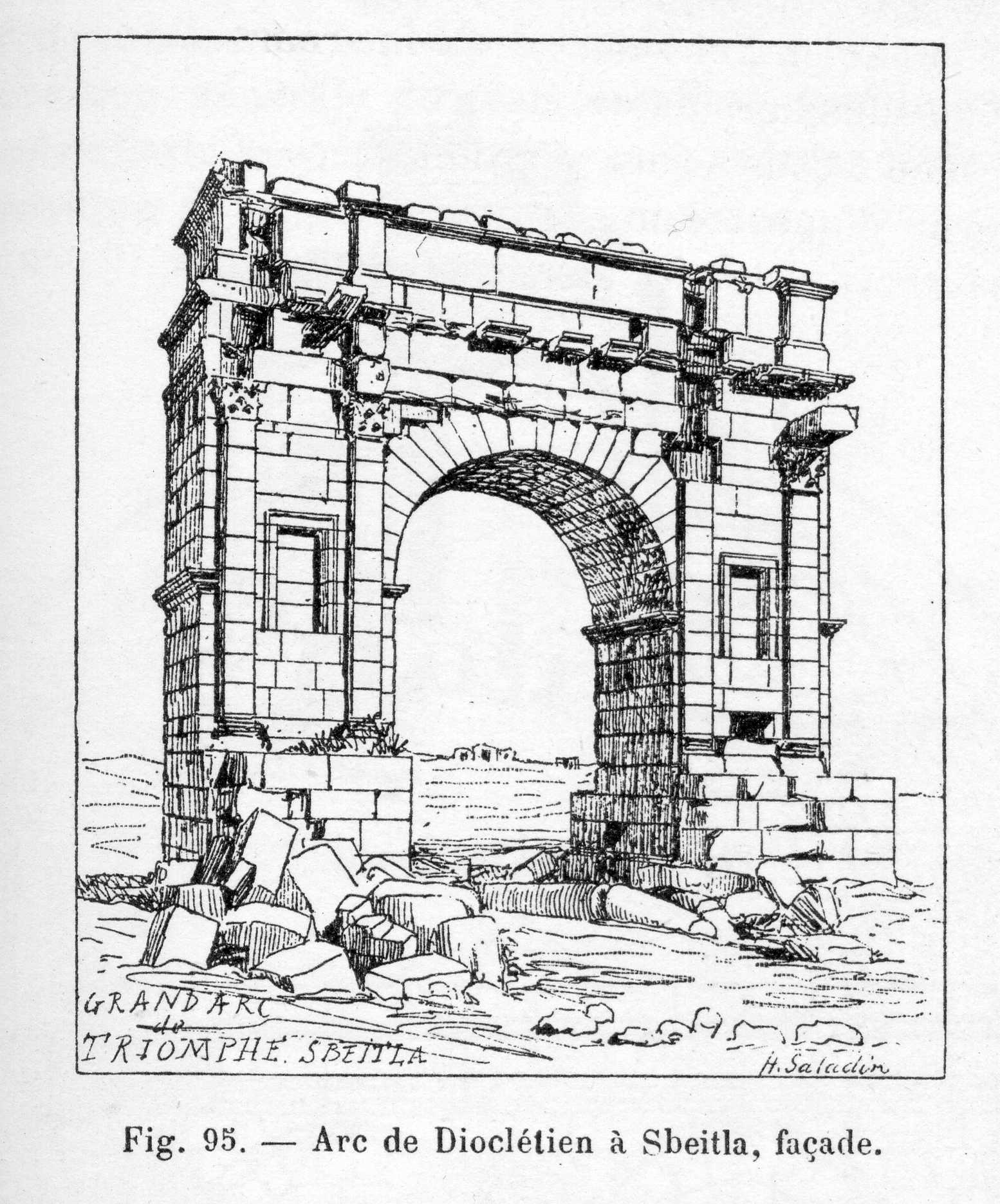
The Arch of the Tetrarchy drawn by Henri Saladin

The bridge-aqueduct photographed by Eugène Gallois

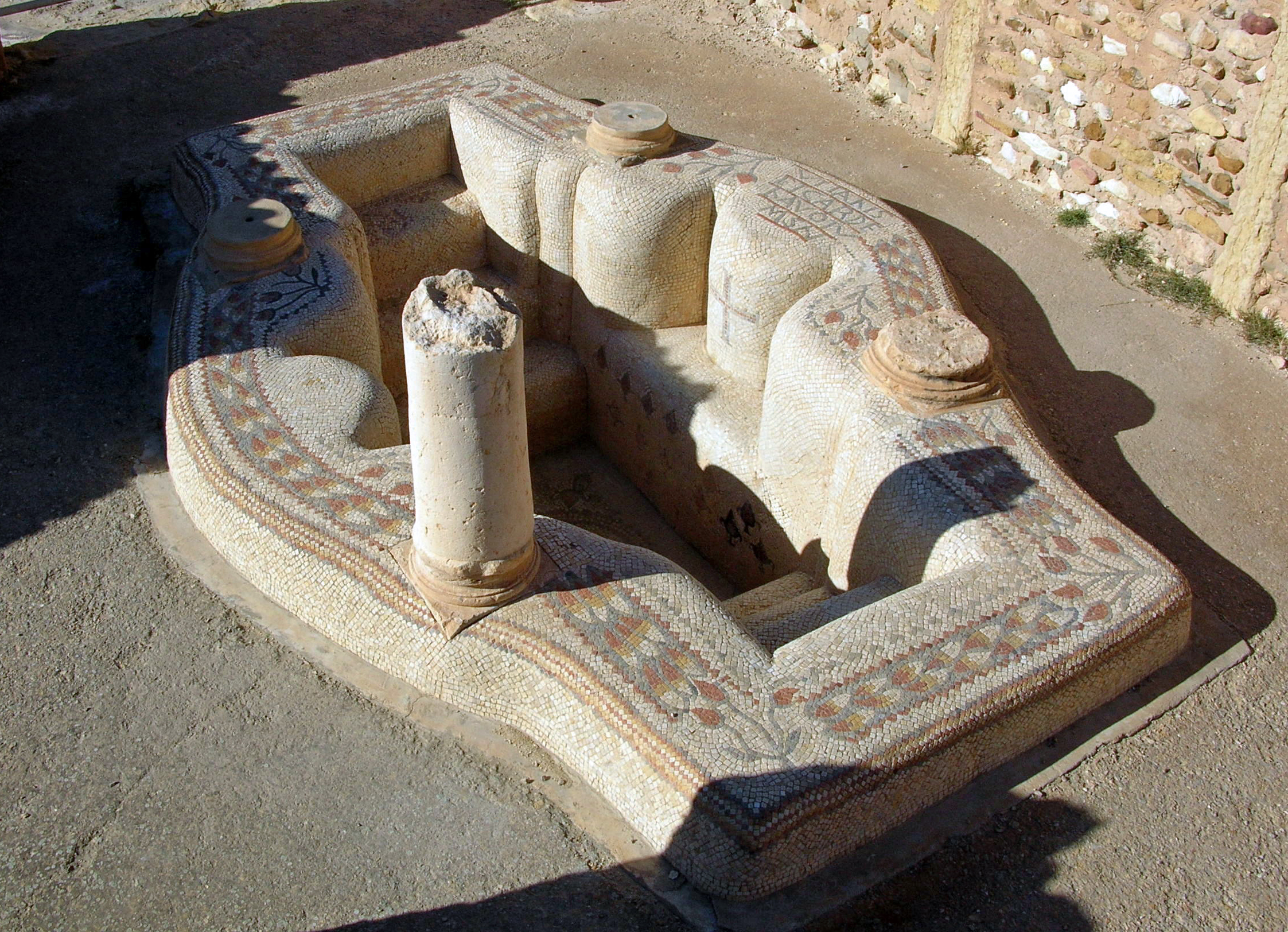
View of the archaeological site

== Culture ==
=== Museum ===
Sbeitla Archaeological Museum

The archaeological museum, opposite the site, has four rooms and a vestibule covering daily life from prehistory to the Islamic period: the Capsian culture, marble sculpture from Sbeitla and the region, two mosaic panels from private houses together with displays on the ancient economy, and Christian-era finds.

=== Festivals ===
Since 2001, the town has held the annual Sbeitla's Spring Festival, founded by the poet and actor Adnen Helali, which uses the ancient theatre as its stage and has honoured figures such as Mahmoud Yacine and Mahmoud Messadi. The older Abadla International Festival has been held since 1980. The nearby Jebel Semmama hosts the Shepherds' Festival (Eid al-Ru'at), which celebrates pastoral life and mountain heritage; its April 2023 edition welcomed visitors from twelve countries. On 18 April 2024, the archaeological site hosted the opening ceremony of Tunisia's 32nd Heritage Month.

== Education and health ==
The Higher Institute of Applied Studies in Humanities of Sbeitla (ISEAH Sbeitla), part of the University of Kairouan, offers applied degrees in fields including tourism, Spanish and business English. A mixed secondary school (lycée) opened in 1967.

A new category-B regional hospital, planned in 2012 and begun in 2016, was delayed for years by financial difficulties, disputes over deadlines and the COVID-19 pandemic. Its first departments (emergency, laboratory, obstetrics and internal medicine) opened on 6 June 2026. Built at the entrance to the town on a site of about 6 ha, it has 105 beds, six operating theatres and a six-bed intensive-care unit, and cost about 67 million dinars, including nearly 15 million for equipment.

== Economy ==
The economy of Sbeitla relies on agriculture, handicraft, tourism and petroleum production managed by ETAP in the oil field of Douleb. Because the delegation is classified as a priority regional development zone, a new 20-hectare industrial zone was laid out in 2018 by the Kasserine Industrial and Technological Complex Company (SCITEK). Tourism, based on the archaeological site, declined sharply after the 2011 revolution, because of the presence of armed groups in the nearby Jebel Chambi mountains and repeated unrest in the region.

=== Agriculture ===
The area produces olives (for table and oil) and almonds, as well as fruit (apples, peaches, apricots, pears, pistachios, pomegranates and figs), fodder and cereals. Prickly pear is widespread, and two local units extract prickly pear seed oil. Sheep, goats and cattle are also raised. The state farm of El Khadra, run by the Office of State Lands, alone covers about 15,000 hectares. The delegation contains 919 shallow wells, 137 deep wells, a mountain lake and a mountain dam, but the irrigated area remains limited to 2,930 hectares.

Distribution of irrigated areas in 2008.
Irrigable areas (ha)			Irrigated areas (ha)			Usage rate (%)			Densification rate (%)		
Public	Private	Total	Public	Private	Total	Public	Private	Total	Public	Private	Total
992	2374	3366	794	2136	2930	80	100	90	110	111	111

=== Petroleum industry ===
The Douleb oil field has been operated by ETAP since 12 April 1968 and produces 230,000 barrels per year. Its output peaked in 1974 at 1,200 m^{3} per day.

=== Handicraft ===
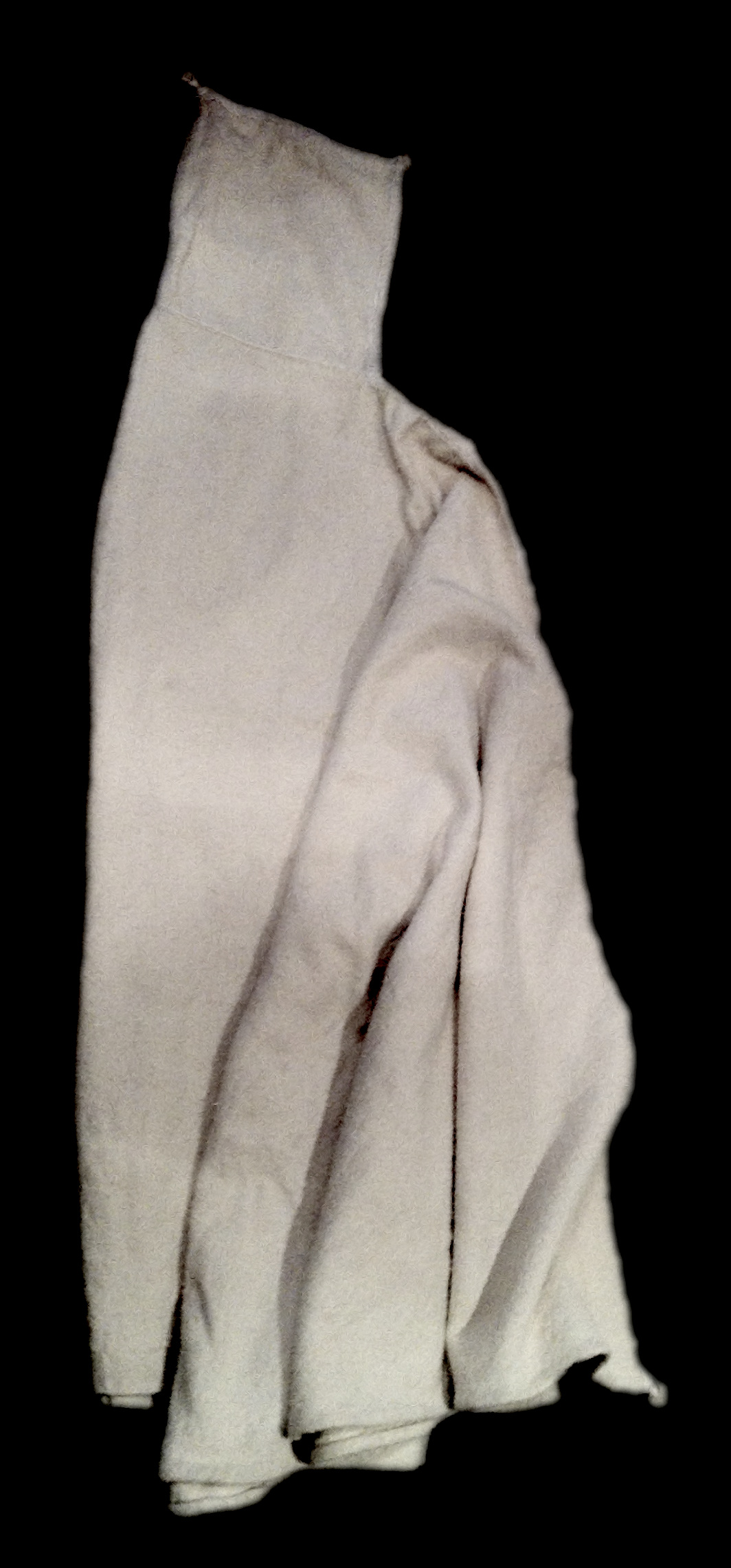
Tunisian burnous

Most of the handicraft in Sbeitla is based on wool processing, such as the Tunisian burnous. Handicraft in Sbeitla is dominated by two traditions. The first is wool processing, used for garments such as the Tunisian burnous. The second is the weaving of alfa (esparto grass), one of the oldest crafts in Tunisia: the delegations of Sbeitla, Majel Bel Abbès, Thala, Fériana and Hassi El Ferid have long been the main centres of alfa work in the Kasserine Governorate. Women weave the fibre on traditional looms into mats (hassira), carpets and baskets, and pass the techniques down through the generations, while the harvest of the grass on nearby Jebel Semmama still relies on a small number of women gatherers. Alfa products have since been adapted to interior decoration and contemporary design. In 2022, a joint Tunisian, Algerian, Moroccan and Spanish nomination of alfa mat weaving for UNESCO's Intangible Cultural Heritage lists was reported to be in preparation.

== Transport ==
Sbeitla lies on the RN13 national road linking Sfax to Kasserine, and its position at the crossing of routes from the coast to the interior has made it a point of passage and trade.

The town was connected to the railway network during the French protectorate. A metre-gauge line of the Compagnie des chemins de fer Bône-Guelma, built from Sousse through Jilma, reached Sbeitla in 1908 and was extended through Kasserine to Henchir Souatir in 1909. It was built as a line of penetration into the interior, mainly to carry alfa. A district, Cité Mahata ("station quarter"), grew up around the station, the railway workers' houses and the depot of the Tunisian transport company. During the fighting of February 1943, retreating American troops blew up the railway bridge along with the town's water-pumping station.

Sbeitla railway station on a postcard, early 1920s

== Sports ==
Sbeitla's most popular sports club is Union Sportive Sbeitla (USS), founded in 1947. In June 2013, the club eliminated Stade Tunisien from the Tunisian Cup on penalties, the best result in its history. In June 2014, it won the Amateur League Cup against Mouldiet Manouba.

== Notable people ==
- Ali Ben Ghedhahem (1814 – 10 October 1867), leader of the Mejba Revolt of 1864 against the beylical regime.
- Mongi Soussi Zarrouki (24 February 1936 – 26 May 2000), athlete who competed at the 1959 Mediterranean Games and the 1960 Summer Olympics.
- Lotfi Ben Jeddou (born 31 July 1964), Minister of the Interior from March 2013 to February 2015.

== See also ==
- Archaeological site of Sbeitla
- Sufetula (see), the former Catholic bishopric turned titular see
- Battle of Sufetula (647)
