= Patrick Vincent Flood =

Patrick Vincent Flood, DD, O.P., (1844–1907) was an Irish Dominican priest who served as Archbishop of Port of Spain, Trinidad (1889–1907).

Born in Lagan, Co. Longford on 14 September 1844. Flood joined the Dominicans in St. Mary's Priory, Tallaght, Dublin, aged 16 in 1860. He proceeded to Esker Friary, Co. Galway where he professed in 1861 and continued studying philosophy in Esker from 1862 to 1863. Sent to Rome to study his theology at the Minerva, he was ordained a priest in 1867, and a year later took his Doctorate of Divinity. Returning to Ireland, he served in Cork and Waterford, before being appointed Prior of Galway, and later Prior of Newry.

Flood was appointed Coadjutor Bishop of Port of Spain, Trinidad and Tobago, Antilles (to succeed Rev. Dr. Hyland, also an Irish Dominican) and Titular Bishop of Hephaestus, in 1887 and ordained in St Mary's Pro-Cathedral, Dublin. He succeeded as Archbishop of Port of Spain in 1889 a position he held until his death on 17 May 1907.
