= Diocese of Roseau =

Diocese of the Catholic Church

Coordinates: 15.2973°N 61.3854°W

Diocese of Roseau Dioecesis Rosensis
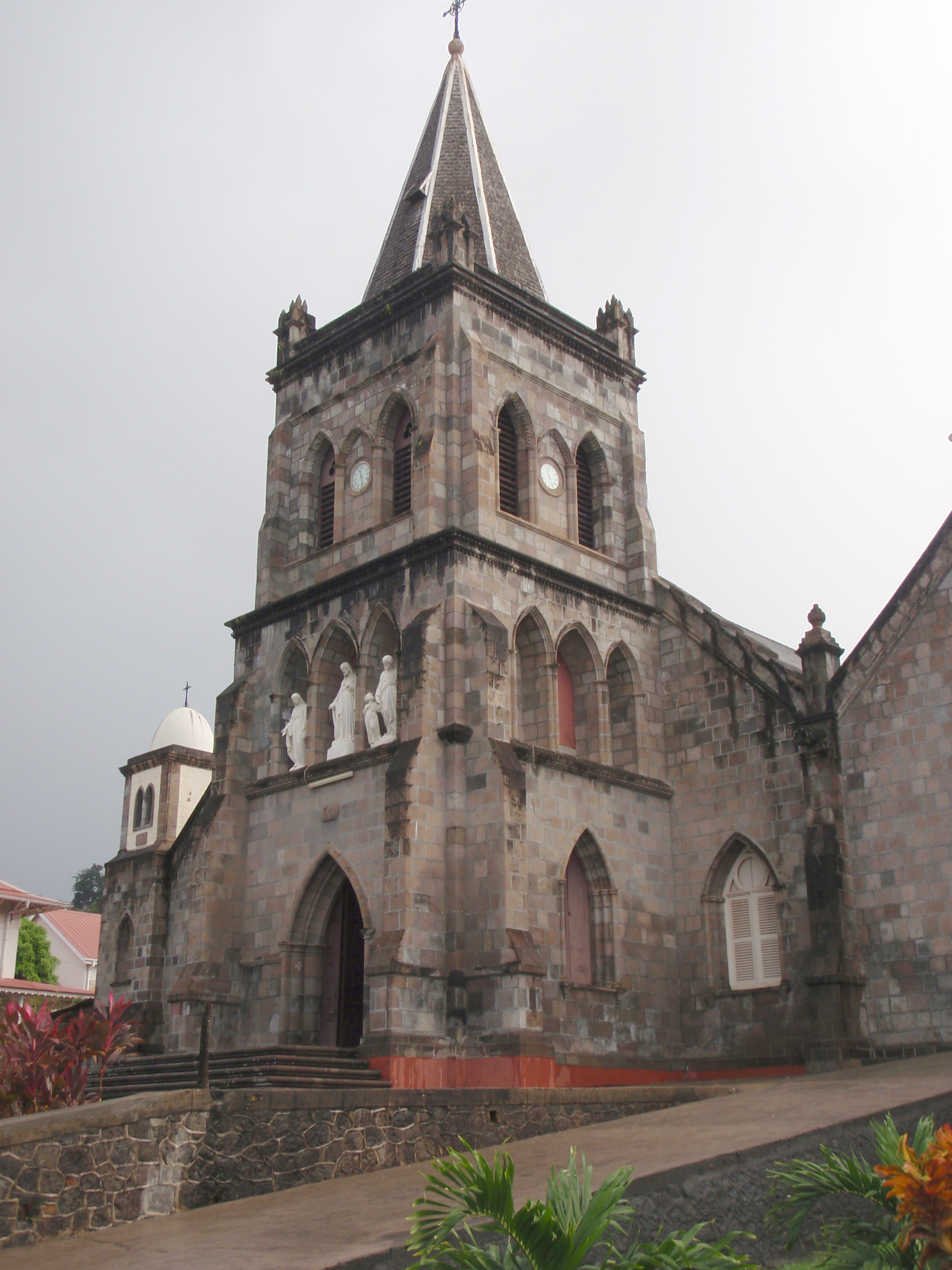
- Cathedral of Our Lady of Fair Haven

Location
- Country: Dominica
- Ecclesiastical province: Province of Castries
- Metropolitan: Gabriel Malzaire

Statistics
- Area: 750 km^{2} (290 sq mi)
- Population: Total; Catholics: (as of 2010); 68,635; 42,174 (61.4%)
- Parishes: 14

Information
- Denomination: Catholic Church
- Sui iuris church: Latin Church
- Rite: Roman Rite
- Established: 30 April 1850 (176 years ago)
- Cathedral: Cathedral of Our Lady of Fair Haven

Current leadership
- Pope: Leo XIV
- Bishop: Kendrick Forbes

Website
- www.dioceseofroseau.org

The Diocese of Roseau (Latin: Dioecesis Rosensis) is a diocese of the Latin Church of the Catholic Church in the Caribbean. The diocese encompasses the entirety of the country of Dominica. The diocese is a suffragan of the Archdiocese of Castries, and a member of the Antilles Episcopal Conference.

The diocese of Roseau was erected in 1850. The territory was previously part of the former Vicariate Apostolic of Trinidad.

== Bishops ==
=== Ordinaries ===
- Michael Monaghan (1851–1855)
- Désiré-Michel Vesque (1856–1858)
- René-Marie-Charles Poirier, C.I.M. (1858–1878)
- Michael Naughten (1879–1900)
- Philip Schelfhaut, C.Ss.R. (1902–1921)
- Giacomo Moris, C.Ss.R. (1922–1957)
- Arnold Boghaert, C.Ss.R. (1957–1993)
- Edward Joseph Gilbert, C.Ss.R. (1994–2001), appointed Archbishop of Port of Spain, Trinidad and Tobago
- Gabriel Malzaire (2002–2022)
- Kendrick Forbes (2024)

=== Coadjutor bishops ===
- Antoon Demets, C.SS.R. (1946–1954), did not succeed to see
- Arnold Boghaert, C.SS.R. (1956–1957)
