= Désiré-Michel Vesque =

Roman-catholic bishop

- Bishop of Roseau
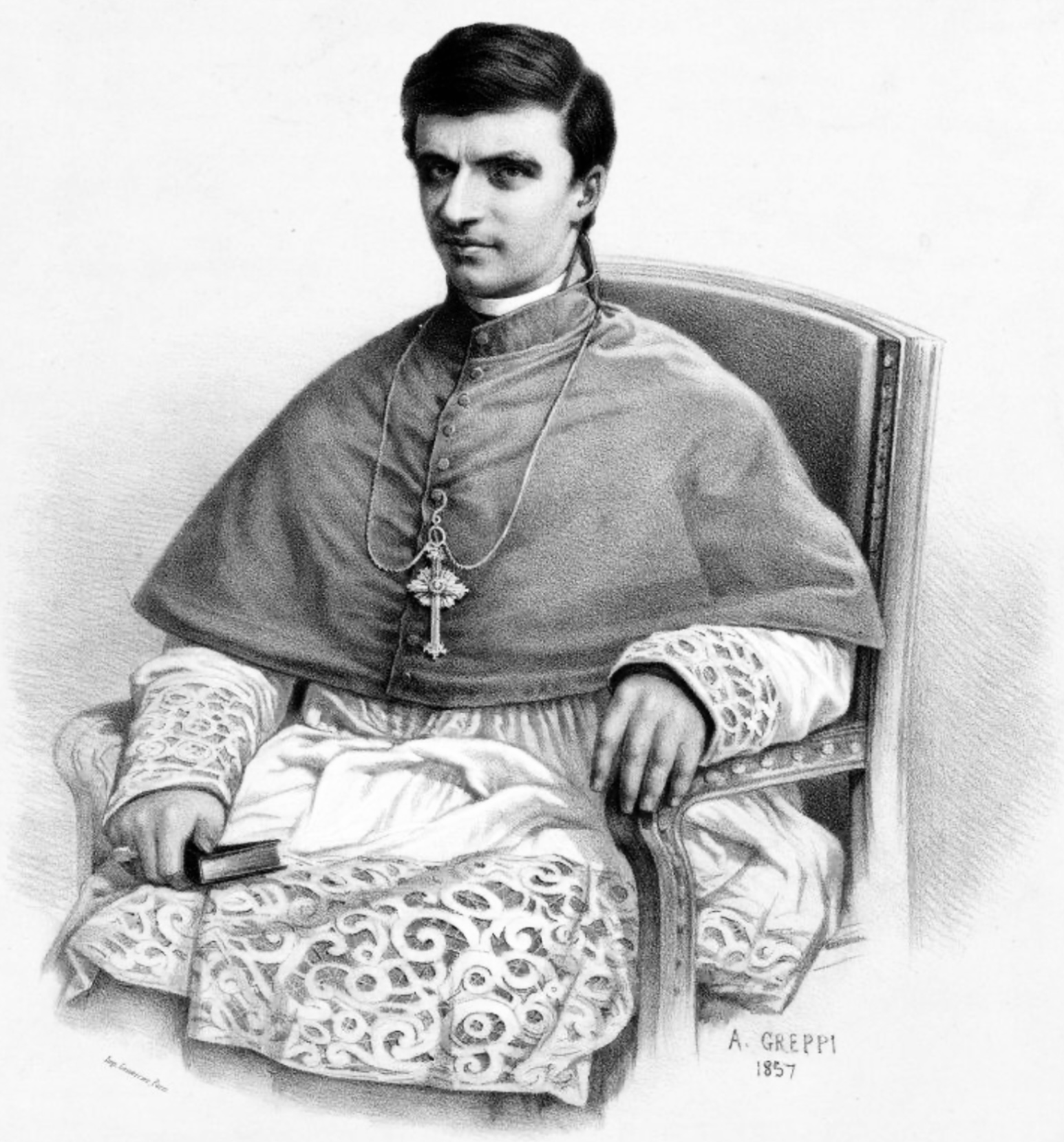
- Church: Catholic Church
- Diocese: Diocese of Roseau
- In office: 9 August 1856 – 10 July 1858
- Predecessor: Michael Monaghan
- Successor: René-Marie-Charles Poirier

Orders
- Ordination: 1840
- Consecration: 26 October 1856 by Nicholas Wiseman

Personal details
- Born: 19 November 1817 Honfleur, Calvados, Kingdom of France
- Died: 10 July 1858 (aged 40)

Désiré-Michel Vesque (born 19 November 1817 in Honfleur; died 10 July 1858) was a French clergyman and bishop for the Roman Catholic Diocese of Roseau. He was ordained in 1840. He was appointed bishop in 1856. He died in 1858.
