= Douleb =

Douleb الدولاب
- Location in Tunisia
- Coordinates: 35°23′6″N 8°54′6″E
- Country: Tunisia
- Governorate: Kasserine Governorate

Population (2004)
  - Total: 3,869
- Time zone: UTC1 (CET)
- Postal code: 1200

Douleb (Arabic: الدولاب) is a small town in north-central Tunisia, belongs to Sbeitla in the Kasserine Governorate. It is well known by its oil field exploited by ETAP.

The Oil field of Douleb exports petrol in pipes of 6 inch's diameters.
