= Tomás Francisco Reilly =

American-born bishop

The Most Reverend Tomás Francisco Reilly, C.Ss.R., D.D.
- Bishop of San Juan de la Maguana
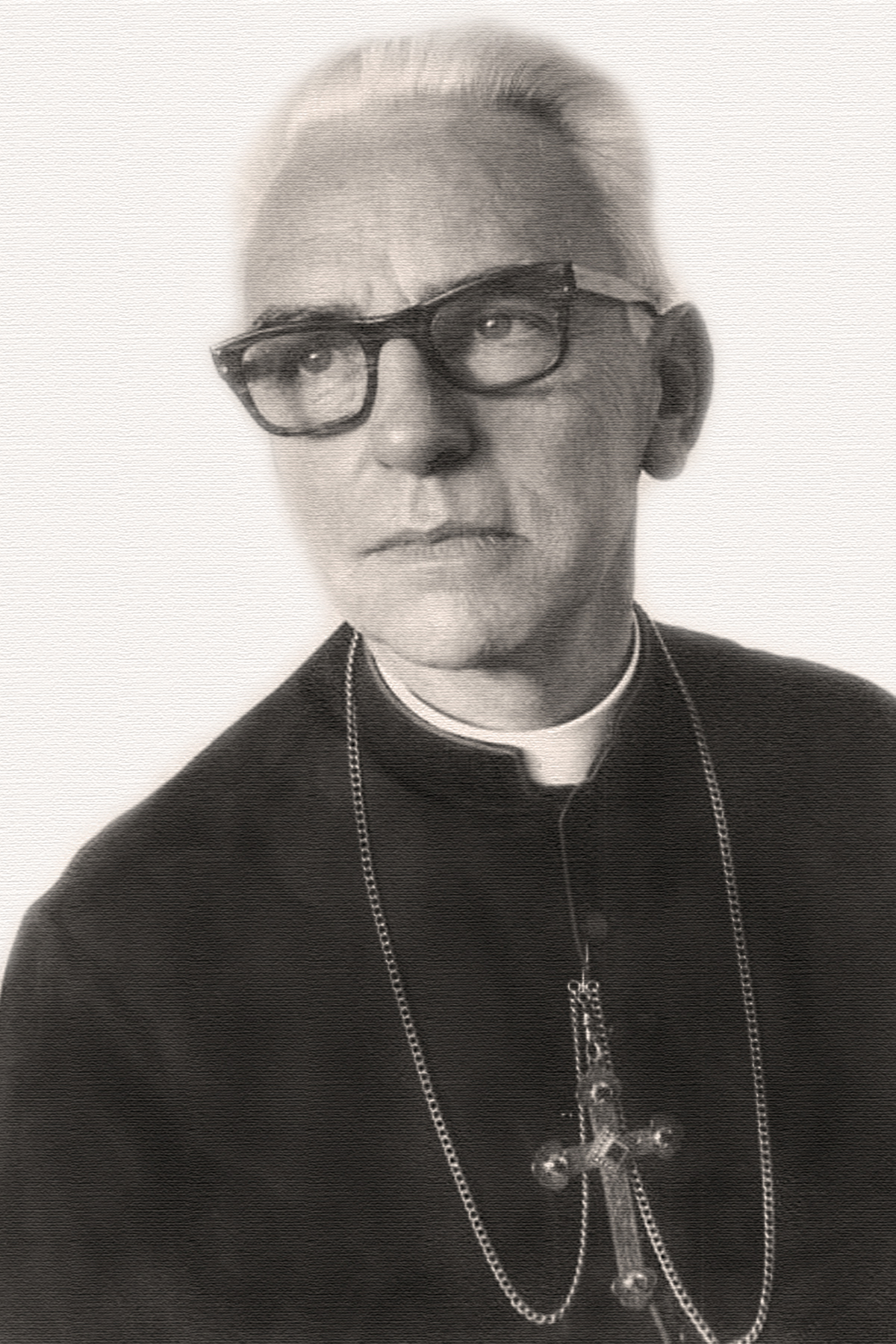
- Church: Catholic Church
- See: San Juan de la Maguana
- In office: November 21, 1969—July 20, 1977
- Predecessor: None
- Successor: Ronald Gerard Connors, C.Ss.R
- Previous posts: Titular Bishop of Themisonium; Prelate of San Juan de la Maguana (1956-1969)

Orders
- Ordination: June 10, 1933
- Consecration: November 30, 1956 by Salvatore Siino

Personal details
- Born: December 20, 1908 Boston, Massachusetts, United States
- Died: July 21, 1992 (aged 83)
- Motto: Ad lucem indeficientem
- Coat of arms

Tomás Francisco Reilly (December 20, 1908 – July 21, 1992) was an American-born bishop in the Catholic Church. He served as Prelate of San Juan de la Maguana in the Dominican Republic from 1956–1969 and the first bishop of the Diocese of San Juan de la Maguana from 1969–1977.

== Biography ==
Thomas Francis Reilly was born in Boston, Massachusetts. He professed religious vows in the Congregation of the Most Holy Redeemer, more commonly known as the Redemptorists, and was ordained a priest on June 10, 1933.

Pope Pius XII named Reily Titular Bishop of Themisonium and Prelate of San Juan de la Maguana on July 22, 1956. He was consecrated a bishop on November 30, 1956 by Archbishop Salvatore Siino the Apostolic Nuncio to the Dominican Republic. The principal co-consecrators were Archbishop Octavio Antonio Beras Rojas, the Coadjutor Archbishop of Santo Domingo, and Bishop William Tibertus McCarty, C.Ss.R. of Rapid City, South Dakota. Bishop Reilly attended the second, third and fourth sessions of the Second Vatican Council. Pope Paul VI named him the first Bishop of San Juan de la Maguana when the prelacy was elevated to a diocese on November 21, 1969. He served the prelacy and diocese as a bishop for a total of 21 years. His resignation was accepted by Paul VI on July 20, 1977. He died at the age of 83 in 1992
