= Giacomo Moris =

Giacomo Moris (born 1876 in Peer, Belgium) was a Belgian clergyman and bishop for the Roman Catholic Diocese of Roseau. He was ordained in 1900. He was appointed bishop in 1922. He died in 1957.
