= Michael Naughten =

Irish Catholic bishop

- Bishop of Roseau
- Church: Catholic Church
- Diocese: Diocese of Roseau
- In office: 2 September 1879 – 4 July 1900
- Predecessor: René-Marie-Charles Poirier
- Successor: Philip Schelfhaut

Orders
- Consecration: 4 January 1880 by Thomas Nulty

Personal details
- Born: 28 May 1825 County Meath, United Kingdom of Great Britain and Ireland
- Died: 4 July 1900 (aged 75)

Michael Naughten (28 May 1835, in County Meath – 4 July 1900) was an Irish clergyman and bishop for the Roman Catholic Diocese of Roseau in Dominica. He went to Dominica along with Fr John Molly and Fr. Patrick Smith, all from the College of All Hallows in Dublin, Ireland, where they were trained for the foreign missions. He was appointed bishop in 1879, and consecrated bishop in Mullingar by Bishop Nulty, in 1880 the 4th Bishop of Roseau, successor to Bishop René-Marie-Charles Poirier. Bishop Naughton invited The Nuns of the Faithful Virgin, from Kennsington, England, to operate schools in the Diocese.
