= Arnold Boghaert =

Belgian bishop

Arnold Boghaert C.Ss.R.
- Bishop of Roseau
- Church: Catholic Church
- Diocese: Diocese of Roseau
- In office: 4 June 1957 – 29 November 1993
- Predecessor: Jaak Moris
- Successor: Edward Joseph Gilbert
- Previous posts: Titular Bishop of Sufetula (1956-1957); Coadjutor Bishop of Roseau (1956-1957)

Orders
- Ordination: 18 June 1944
- Consecration: 25 February 1957 by Efrem Forni

Personal details
- Born: 21 October 1920 Landegem, East Flanders, Belgium
- Died: 29 November 1993 (aged 73)

Arnold Boghaert (21 October 1920 – 29 November 1993) was a Belgian clergyman and bishop for the Roman Catholic Diocese of Roseau. Boghaert was born in Landegem. He became ordained in 1944. He was appointed bishop in 1956. He died on 29 November 1993, at the age of 73.
