= René-Marie-Charles Poirier =

Roman-catholic bishop

René-Marie-Charles Poirier CIM
- Bishop of Roseau
- Church: Catholic Church
- Diocese: Diocese of Roseau
- In office: 12 November 1858 – 23 April 1878
- Predecessor: Désiré-Michel Vesque
- Successor: Michael Naughten

Orders
- Ordination: 9 June 1827
- Consecration: 13 February 1859 by Vincenzo Spaccapietra

Personal details
- Born: 7 October 1802 Redon, Ille-et-Vilaine, France
- Died: 23 April 1878 (aged 75)

René-Marie-Charles Poirier (born 7 October 1802 in Redon; died 23 April 1878) was a French clergyman and bishop for the Roman Catholic Diocese of Roseau. He was ordained in 1827. He was appointed bishop in 1858. He died in 1878.
