= Sufetula (see) =

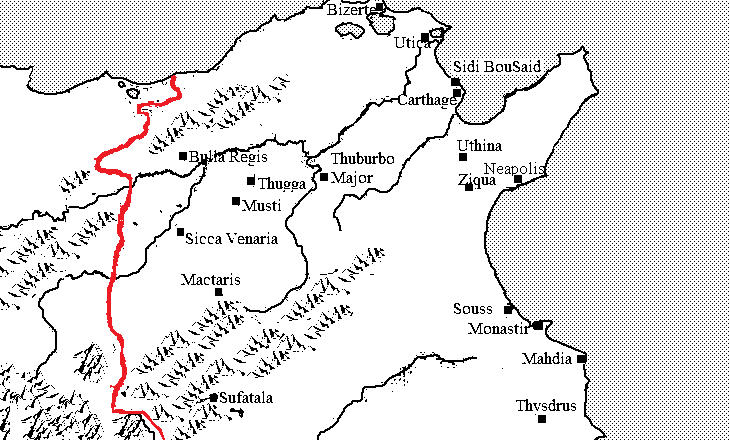
Map of Roman Africa Proconsularae show Sufetula.

The Catholic Diocese of Sufetula was an ancient bishopric in the city of Sufetula, on the site of modern Tunisian Sbeitla, in the Roman province of Byzacena.

== Background ==
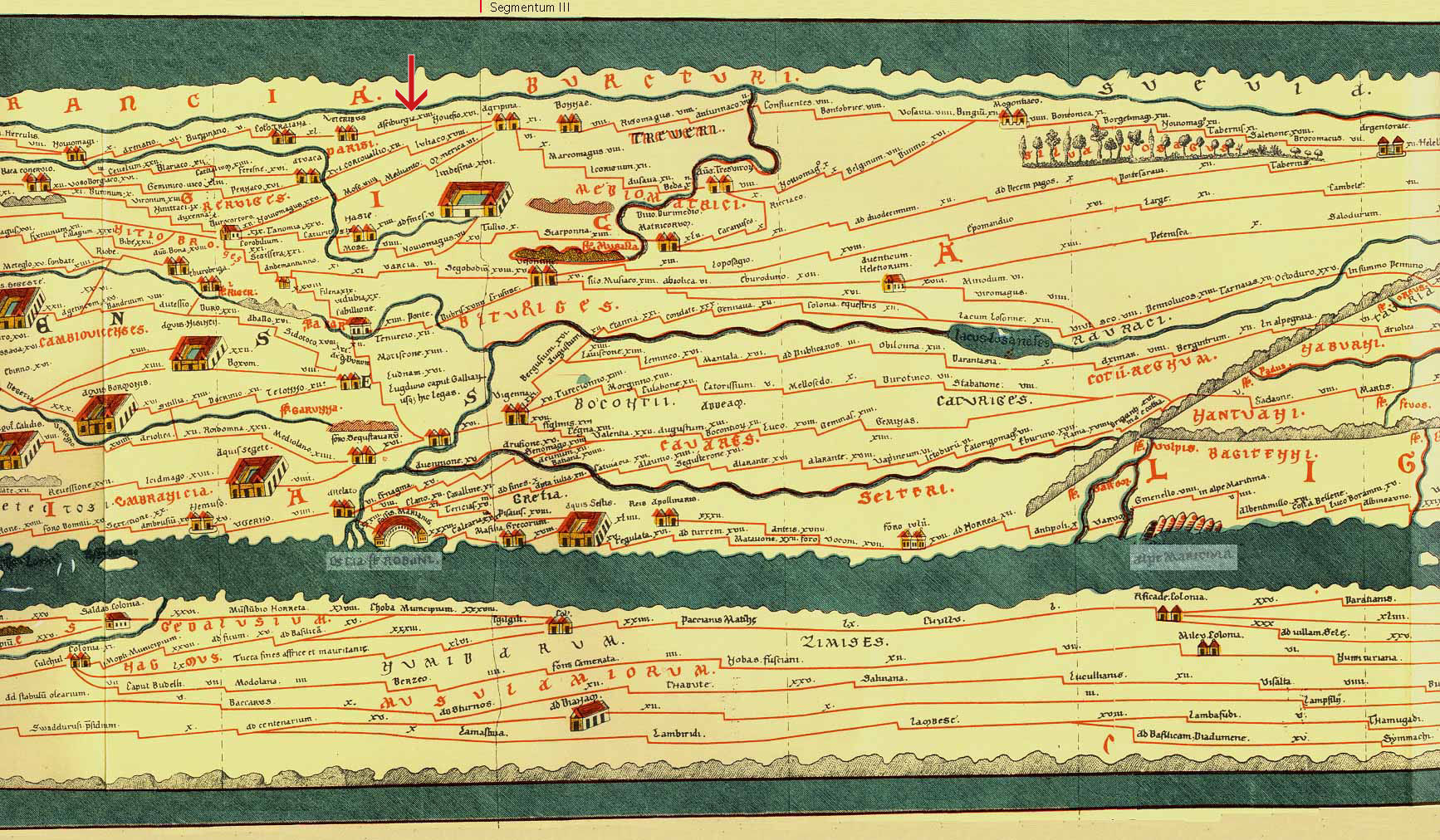
Peutinger Table.

Sufetula, also known as Speitla and Sbeitla, is an archaeological site in Tunisia with well-preserved ruins from the Roman Empire. Roman era Sufetula was a civitas (town) and border post on the limes Africana in the Roman province of Africa during the Roman Empire.

The town was flourishing by 79AD and lasted until 647, when the town was sacked by Arab–Berber raiders.

== Ancient Bishopric ==
Sufetula was also the seat of an ancient Christian bishopric. The bishopric was founded during the Roman Empire and survived through the Arian Vandal Kingdom and Orthodox Byzantine Empire, only ceasing to function with the Muslim conquest of the Maghreb.

=== Ancient churches ===
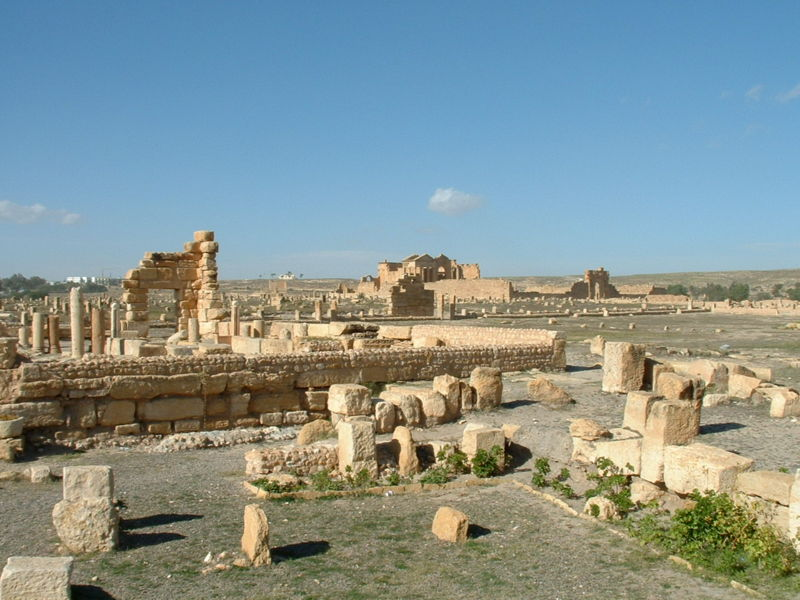
Church of Bellator

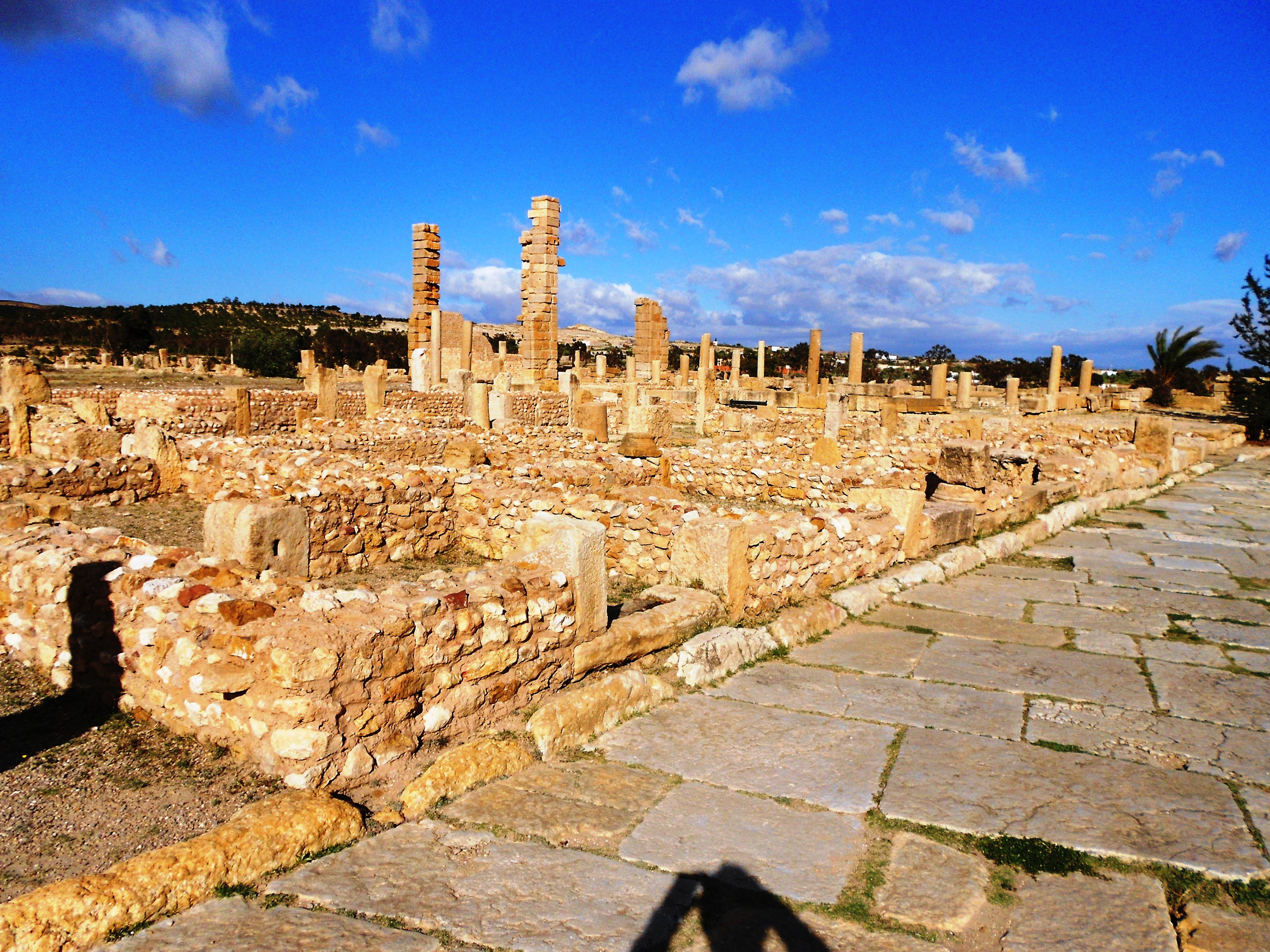
Basilica of Saint Servus

Ruins of Sufetula show that the town had at least six churches.

- The church of Bellator
- The chapel of Jucundus
- The Basilica of Vitalis
- The church of Servus
- The Basilica of Saints Gervasius and Protasius and Tryphon of Campsada
- a sixth-century Basilica
- The chapel of Bishop Honorius, outside the city.
- Byzantine Chapel, largely unexcavated

Among these, several appear to have been cathedra. The so-called Church of Servus is believed to have been the Donatist cathedral of Sufetula, while the church of Bellator was the Catholic, and later Orthodox, cathedral. The Basilica of Vitalis may have been the Arian Cathedral and dates from the 5th century. The remains at Sufetula are important as they indicate that the various sects within Christianity built and kept their places of worship, not being taken over by successive regimes.

=== Known bishops ===
- Privatianus fl. 256
- Jucundus (Catholic) fl. 411-419
- Titianus (Donatist, fl. 411)
- Amicacius (Catholic) early 5th century
- Bellator (Catholic) early 5th century, built church that bears his name; an associate of Jucundus.
- Paesidius (Arian) before 484, was sent into exile by King Huneric before the general purge of bishops
- Honorius (6th century) associated with the siege of Sufetula

== Titular see ==
The diocese was nominally revived as a titular see of the lowest (episcopal) rank in 1914. It has had the following incumbents, mostly missionary members of congregations:

- João Irineu Joffily (1914.08.18 – 1916.05.04), later Archbishop
- Flaminio Belotti (Chinese: 包海容; pinyin: Bao Hairong), Pontifical Institute for Foreign Missions (P.I.M.E.; 14 June 1917 – 23 November 1945)
- Louis Joseph Cabana, White Fathers (M. Afr.) (1947.01.09 – 1953.03.25) (later Archbishop)
- Joseph-Marie-Eugène Bretault, M. Afr. (1954.06.27 – 1955.09.14)
- Arnold Boghaert, Redemptorists (C.SS.R.) (1956.11.09 – 1957.06.04)
- Camille Vandekerckhove, Lazarists (C.M.) (1957.12.24 – 1959.11.10)
- Thomas Patrick Collins, Maryknoll Fathers (M.M.) (1960.11.15 – 1973.12.07)

== Source and external links ==
- GigaCatholic, with incumbent biography links
