= Diocese of San Juan de la Maguana =

Roman Catholic diocese in the Dominican Republic

Diocese of San Juan de la Maguana Dioecesis Sancti Ioannis Maguanensis

Location
- Country: Dominican Republic
- Ecclesiastical province: Province of Santo Domingo
- Metropolitan: San Juan de la Maguana

Statistics
- Area: 7,476 km^{2} (2,886 sq mi)
- Population: Total; Catholics: (as of 2004); 550,000; 450.000 (81.8%)
- Parishes: 29

Information
- Denomination: Roman Catholic
- Rite: Latin Rite
- Established: 25 September 1953 (71 years ago)
- Cathedral: Cathedral of St. John the Baptist

Current leadership
- Pope: Leo XIV
- Bishop: Tomás Alejo Concepción
- Bishops emeritus: José Dolores Grullón Estrella

Map
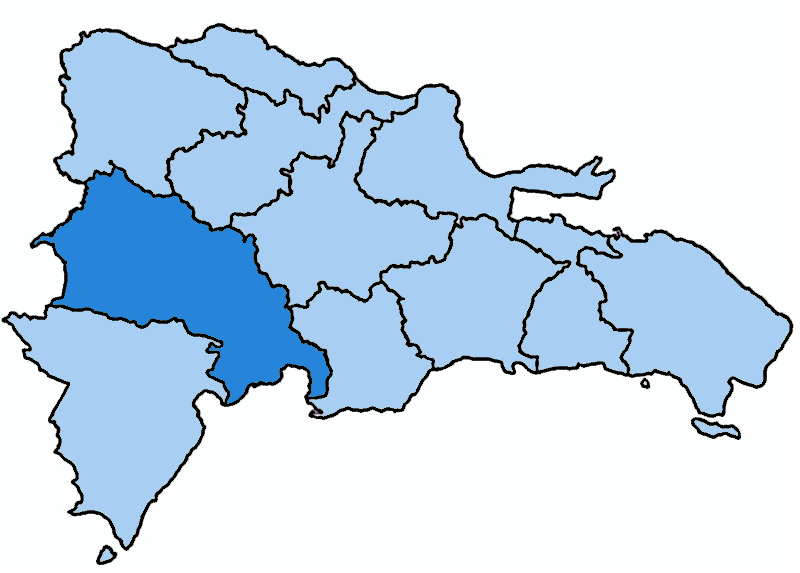

The Roman Catholic Diocese of San Juan de la Maguana (Latin: Dioecesis Sancti Ioannis Maguanensis) (erected 25 September 1953 as the Territorial Prelature of San Juan de la Maguana, elevated 19 November 1969) is a suffragan diocese of the Archdiocese of Santo Domingo.

== Bishops ==
=== Ordinaries ===
- Tomás Francisco Reilly, C.SS.R. (1956–1977)
- Ronald Gerard Connors, C.SS.R. (1977–1991)
- José Dolores Grullón Estrella (1991–2020)
- Tomás Alejo Concepción (2020– )

=== Coadjutor bishop ===
- Ronald Gerard Connors, C.SS.R. (1976–1977)

== Territorial losses ==
Year	Along with	To form
1976		Diocese of Barahona

== External links and references ==
- "Diocese of San Juan de la Maguana". Catholic-Hierarchy.
