= Ronald Gerard Connors =

20th-century American Catholic bishop

The Most Reverend Ronald Gerard Connors, C.Ss.R., D.D.
- Bishop of San Juan de la Maguana
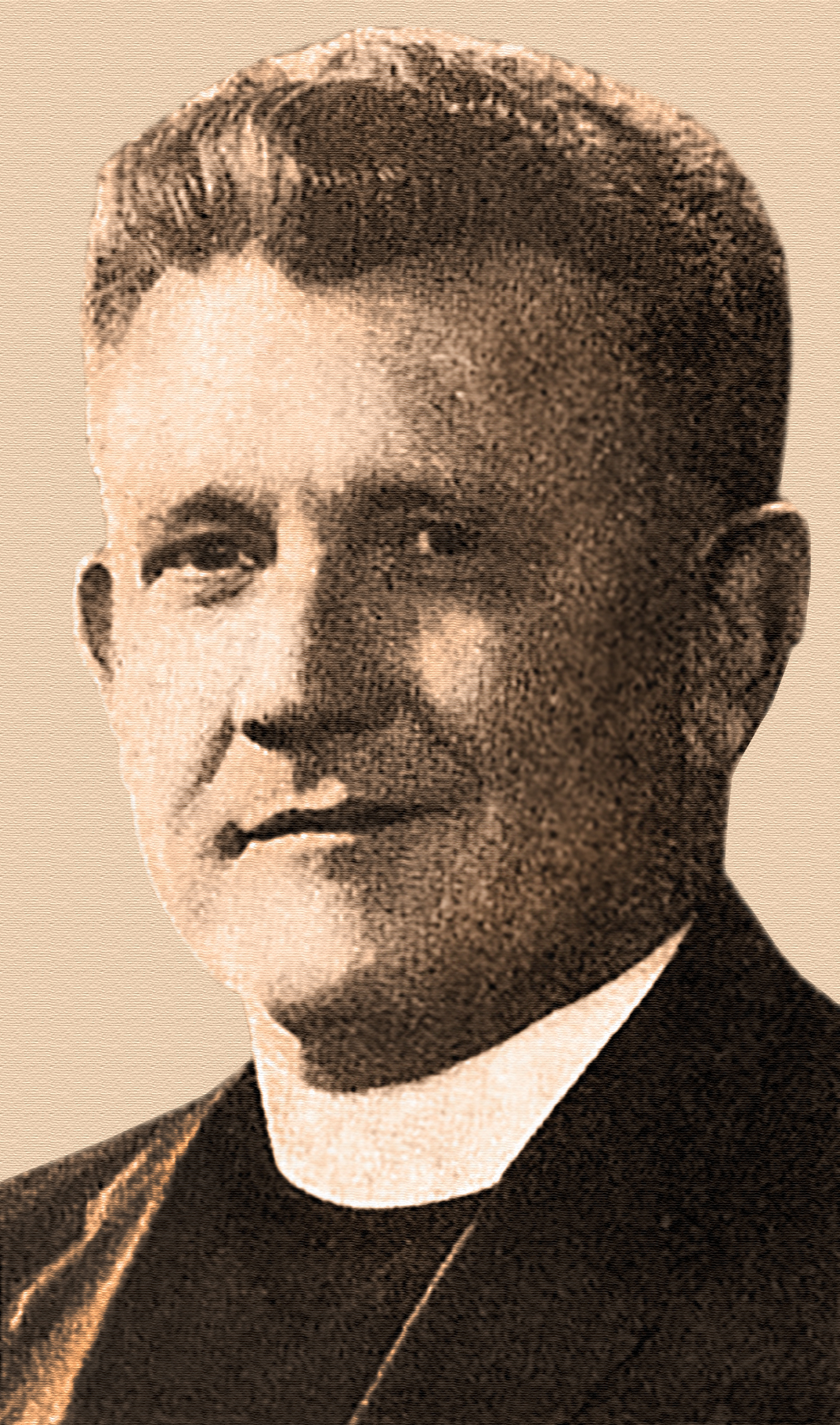
- Church: Catholic Church
- Diocese: San Juan de la Maguana
- See: San Juan de la Maguana
- Installed: July 20, 1977
- Term ended: February 20, 1991
- Predecessor: Tomás Francisco Reilly
- Successor: José Dolores Grullón Estrella
- Previous posts: Titular Bishop of Equizetum; Coadjutor Bishop of San Juan de la Maguana

Orders
- Ordination: June 22, 1941 by Stephen Joseph Donahue
- Consecration: July 20, 1977 by Octavio Beras Rojas

Personal details
- Born: November 1, 1915 Brooklyn, New York, United States
- Died: November 27, 2002 (aged 87)
- Motto: Apacienta mis ovejas
- Coat of arms: Ronald Gerard Connors, C.Ss.R., D.D.'s coat of arms

Ordination history of Ronald Gerard Connors
History
Episcopal consecration
- Consecrated by: Octavio Beras Rojas
Episcopal succession
Bishops consecrated by Ronald Gerard Connors as principal consecrator
- José Dolores Grullón Estrella: June 22, 1991

Ronald Gerard Connors (November 1, 1915 – November 27, 2002) was an American bishop in the Catholic Church. He served as the second bishop of the Diocese of San Juan de la Maguana in the Dominican Republic from 1977 to 1991.

== Biography ==
Connors was born in Brooklyn, New York. He professed religious vows in the Congregation of the Most Holy Redeemer, more commonly known as the Redemptorists, and was ordained a priest on June 22, 1941.

Pope Paul VI appointed Connors as Titular Bishop of Equizetum and Coadjutor Bishop of San Juan de la Maguana on April 24, 1976. He was consecrated as a bishop on July 20, 1976, by Cardinal Octavio Beras Rojas, Archbishop of Santo Domingo. The principal co-consecrators were Bishops Tomás Francisco Reilly of San Juan de la Maguana and Edwin Broderick of Albany, New York.

He succeeded to the See of San Juan de la Maguana on July 20, 1977, and served the diocese for a total of 15 years. His resignation was accepted by Pope John Paul II on February 20, 1991. Connors died at the age of 87 in 2002.
