= Philip Schelfhaut =

Roman-catholic bishop

Philip Schelfhaut CSsR
- Bishop of Roseau
- Church: Catholic Church
- Diocese: Diocese of Roseau
- In office: 22 January 1902 – 22 May 1921
- Predecessor: Michael Naughten
- Successor: Jaak Moris

Orders
- Ordination: 18 October 1878
- Consecration: 16 March 1902 by Pierre-Lambert Goossens

Personal details
- Born: 27 September 1850 Sint-Niklaas, East Flanders, Belgium
- Died: 22 May 1921 (aged 70)

Philip Schelfhaut (born 1850 in Sint-Niklaas) was a Belgian clergyman and bishop for the Roman Catholic Diocese of Roseau. He was ordained in 1878. He was appointed bishop in 1902. He died in 1921.
