= Richard Patrick Smith =

Roman-catholic archbishop (1802–1852)

- Archbishop of Port of Spain
- Church: Catholic Church
- Archdiocese: Archdiocese of Port of Spain
- In office: 26 October 1844 – 6 May 1852
- Predecessor: Daniel McDonnell
- Successor: Vincenzo Spaccapietra
- Previous posts: Titular Bishop of Olympus (1828-1844); Titular Bishop of Agnus (1837-1845); Coadjutor Vicar Apostolic of Trinidad (1837-1844)

Orders
- Ordination: 1825
- Consecration: 10 December 1837 by Daniel McDonnell

Personal details
- Born: 17 March 1802 United Kingdom of Great Britain and Ireland
- Died: 6 May 1852 (aged 50) Port of Spain, Colony of Trinidad, British Empire

Richard Patrick Smith (born 17 March 1802; died 6 May 1852) was an Irish-born Roman Catholic prelate who served as Archbishop of Port of Spain, Trinidad. He was born in the parish of Kilbride, Co. Cavan, Diocese of Meath, on (St. Patrick's Day) 17 March 1802. Having received his early education in Balljonachugh, he entered Maynooth College to study for the priesthood, for the Ardagh Mission (despite Smith being from the Meath diocese), and was ordained in 1825. It was highlighted in the Maynooth Commission Report in 1855, that Dr Smith was technically an external student in Maynooth, attending lectures while residing in the town, since he was destined for foreign missions, this would seem to have contravened the British Government's, statutes for the college. Shortly after ordination he decided to go on the Trinidad Mission, in preparation to preach the Gospel to the French Colonists, he went to France and entered Saint-Sulpice, Paris, where he remained for two years, mastering the French language, he arrived in Trinidad in 1827.

Appointed Coadjutor Vicar Apostolic in 1837, and in 1844 he was appointed Archbishop of Port of Spain, serving until his death. He had guided the diocese from vicariate apostolic to archdiocese, and the transition from slave labour to waged labour.

Smith died 6 May 1852. He had not nominated a successor, which led to some controversies in the diocese.
