= Archaeological site of Sbeitla =

Roman archaeological site in Tunisia

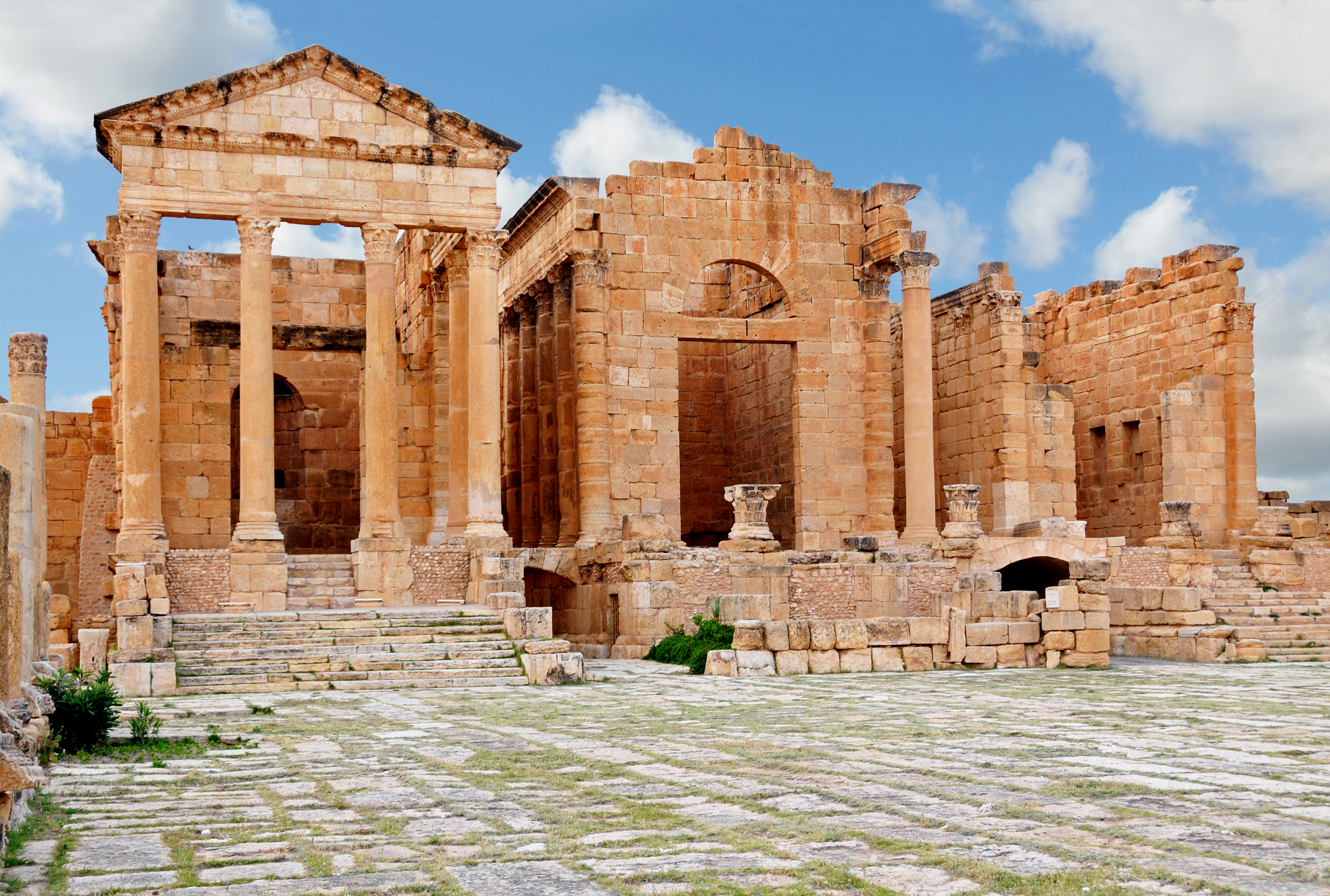
- Capitoline Hill of Sufetula
- Interactive map of Archaeological site of Sbeitla
- 35°14′25″N 9°7′11″E
- Type: Settlement
- Location: Sbeitla, Tunisia
- Part of: Roman Empire; Early Christianity; Byzantine Empire; Vandal Kingdom

History
- Built: 67 AD
- Abandoned: 647 AD

Site notes
- Area: 50 ha (120 acres)
- Excavation dates: 1906-1921

The archaeological site of Sbeitla is an archaeological site in Sbeitla, in north-central Tunisia. It represents the Roman ruins of Sufetula, and contains the best preserved Roman forum temples in Tunisia. It was excavated and restored between 1906 and 1921.

== History ==
The city was founded, if not already in existence, during the reign of Emperor Vespasian. Sufetula was the theatre of the great confrontation between Byzantines and Arabs in 647, setting the stage for the later Muslim conquest of the diocese of Sufetula and further conquests in southern Europe.

== Main sights ==
=== Roman remains ===
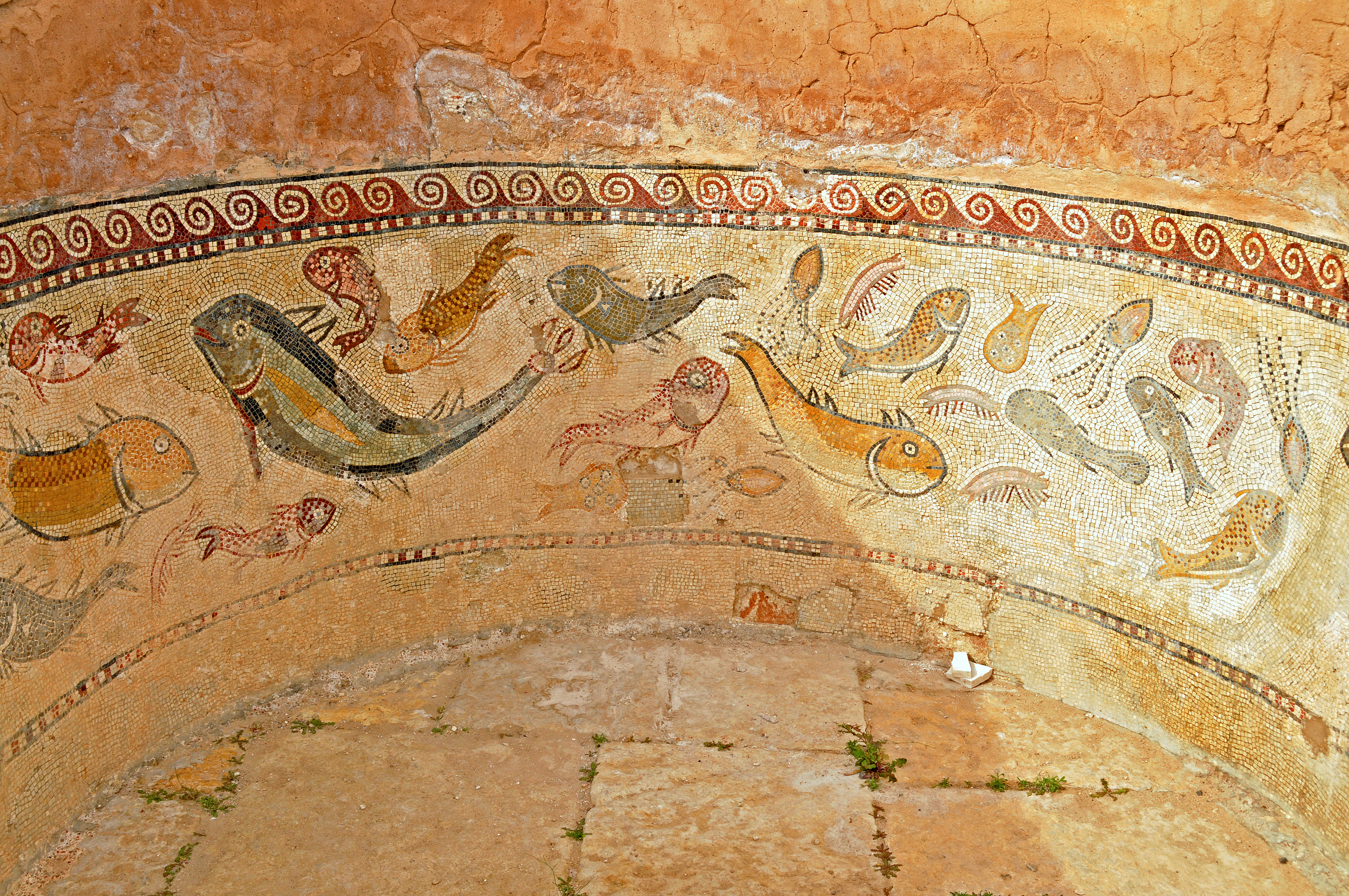
Roman bath with fish mosaic

- The Triumphal Arch of the Tetrarchy at the entrance to the city commemorates the four emperors that governed the empire in the year 300, just before the rule of Constantine the Great
- The Public Baths
- The Forum, one of the best preserved in the world
- The Gate of Antoninus, which stands at the entrance to the forum and can be dated between 138 and 161. Its inscriptions make reference to Antoninus Pius and his two adopted sons, Lucius Verus and Marcus Aurelius
- The three temples. Instead of constructing only one temple dedicated to the three most important Roman gods (Jupiter, Juno, and Minerva), the inhabitants of the city built separate temples for each one. A similar arrangement is also found at Baelo Claudia in Spain
- Other important buildings include the theater and the public fountains

=== Byzantine remains ===
The majority of the Byzantine buildings stand on the foundations and incorporate elements of earlier Roman ones. They include:

- The Basilica of Bellator (late 4th or early 5th century), named for a local bishop and including
  - The Chapel of Jucundus, which served as a baptistery and was named for an early 5th-century bishop buried there
- The Basilica of Vitalis (5th-6th century), named for its founding presbyter. A basin predating the church and decorated by a fish mosaic was found under the floor of its nave
- The Church of Servus (5th century), named for its presbyter
- The Church of Saints Gervasius and Protasius and Saint Tryphon

== In Art and Literature ==
An engraving of a painting by Charles Bentley entitled Ruins of Sbeitlah, the ancient Sufetula, Tunis was published in Fisher's Drawing Room Scrap Book ,1838 with a poetical illustration by Letitia Elizabeth Landon, as Death of the Lion among the Ruins of Sbeitlah.

== See also ==
- List of Ancient Roman temples
- Gregory the Patrician, Byzantine exarch and self-proclaimed Emperor of Africa; killed in the Battle of Sufetula by the Muslims in 647
