= Roman Catholic Archdiocese of Port of Spain =

Latin Catholic ecclesiastical jurisdiction in the Caribbean

Coordinates: 10.6667°N 61.5167°W

Metropolitan Archdiocese of Port of Spain Archidioecesis Metropolitae Portus Hispaniae

Catholic
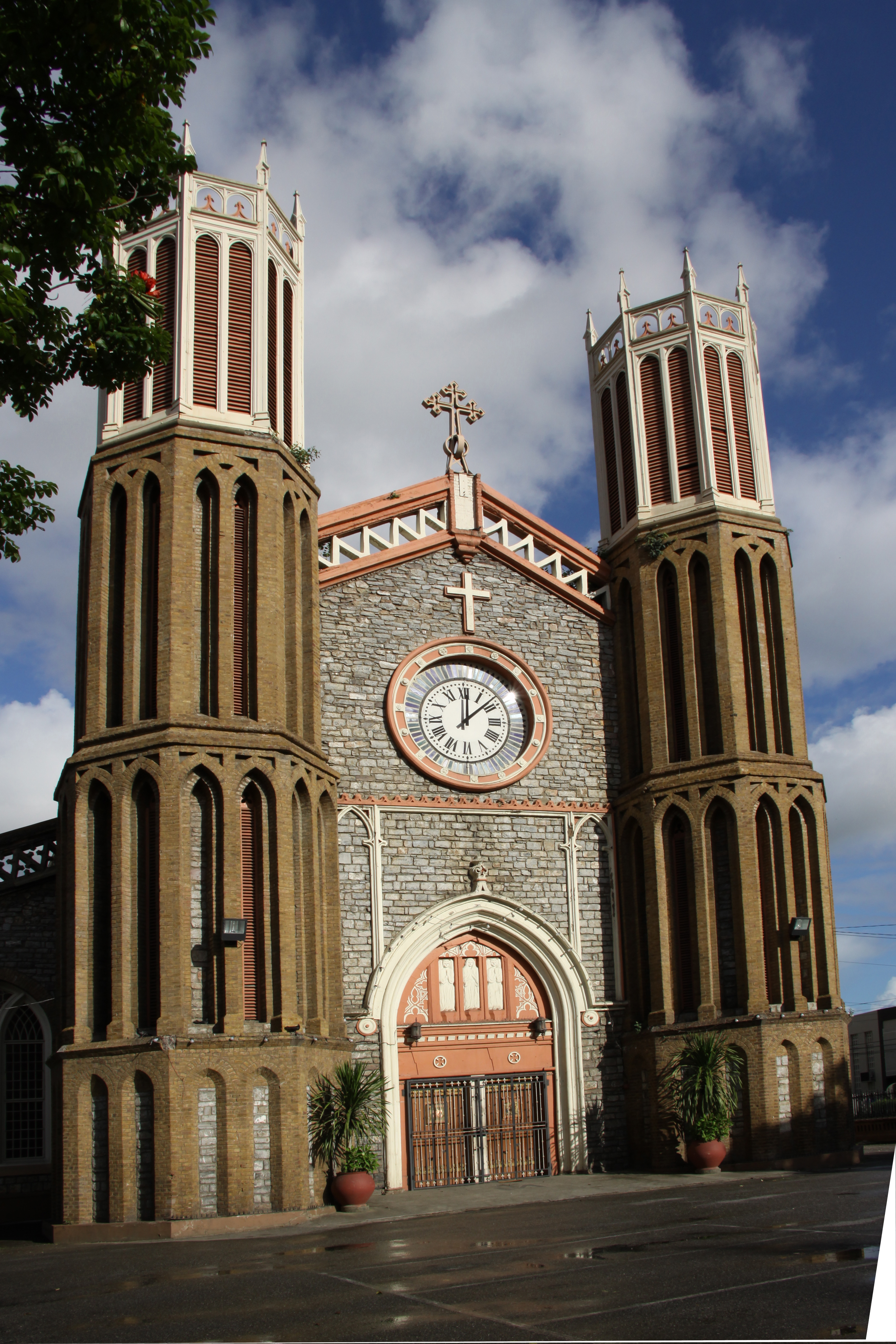
- Cathedral of Port of Spain

Location
- Country: Trinidad and Tobago
- Ecclesiastical province: Port of Spain

Statistics
- Area: 5,128 sq mi (13,280 km^{2})
- Population: Total; Catholics: (as of 2010); 1,310,000; 340,000 (26%)

Information
- Denomination: Catholic Church
- Sui iuris church: Latin Church
- Rite: Roman Rite
- Established: April 30, 1850 (176 years ago)
- Cathedral: Cathedral Basilica of the Immaculate Conception in Port of Spain
- Patron saint: Immaculate Conception

Current leadership
- Pope: Leo XIV
- Metropolitan Archbishop: Charles Jason Gordon
- Vicar General: Fr. Martin Sirju
- Bishops emeritus: Joseph Everard Harris, CSSp

Website
- Website of the Archdiocese

The Metropolitan Archdiocese of Port of Spain (Latin: Archidioecesis Metropolitae Portus Hispaniae) is a metropolitan diocese of the Latin Church of the Catholic Church in the Caribbean. The archdiocese encompasses the entirety of the former Spanish dependency of Trinidad, including the islands of Trinidad and Tobago. The archdiocese is the Metropolitan responsible for the suffragan Dioceses of Bridgetown, Georgetown, Paramaribo and Willemstad, and is a member of the Antilles Episcopal Conference.

The diocese of Port of Spain was originally erected as a vicariate apostolic in 1818 and elevated to an archdiocese in April 1830.

== Communications ==
The archdiocese has its own special-purpose company, Catholic Media Services Limited (CAMSEL), responsible for coordinating communications. The diocesan weekly newspaper, Catholic News, has been published in Trinidad since 1892 and since 2006 has been published by CAMSEL.

There is also a local TV station which operates under the aegis of the archdiocese but is independently owned and operated by the Living Water Community, a public association of Christian Faithful founded in Trinidad.

The vicar for communications is Fr. Robert Christo.

== Pastoral regions ==
The archdiocese is divided into six regions known as vicariates and each headed by a regional episcopal vicar.

- Central Vicariate
- Eastern Vicariate
- Northern Vicariate
- Southern Vicariate
- Suburban Vicariate
- Tobago Vicariate

== Bishops ==
=== Ordinaries ===
- James Buckley (1819–1828)
- Daniel McDonnell (bishop) (1828–1844)
- Richard Patrick Smith (1844–1852)
- Vincent Spaccapietra (1855–1859)
- Ferdinand English (1860–1862)
- Joachim-Hyacinthe Gonin, O.P. (1863–1889)
- Patrick Vincent Flood, O.P. (1889–1907)
- John Pius Dowling, O.P. (1909–1940)
- Patrick Finbar Ryan, O.P. (1940–1966)
- Gordon Anthony Pantin, C.S.Sp. (1967–2000)
- Edward Joseph Gilbert, C.Ss.R. (2001–2011)
- Joseph Everard Harris, C.S.Sp. (2011-2017)
- Charles Jason Gordon (since 2017)

=== Coadjutor bishops ===
- Richard Patrick Smith (1837-1844), as Coadjutor Vicar Apostolic
- William Dominic O'Carroll, O.P. (1874-1880), did not succeed to see
- Thomas Raymond Hyland, O.P. (1882-1884), did not succeed to see
- George Vincent King, O.P. 1885-1886), did not succeed to see
- Patrick Vincent Flood, O.P. (1887-1889)
- Patrick Finbar Ryan, O.P. (1937–1940)
- Joseph Everard Harris, C.S.Sp. (2011)

=== Auxiliary bishops ===
- William Michael Fitzgerald, O.P. (1958-1968)
- John Mendes (1988-2002)
- Robert Anthony Llanos (2013-2018), appointed Bishop of Saint John's-Basseterre, Virgin Islands (British)

=== Other priests of this diocese who became bishops ===
- Sydney Anicetus Charles, appointed Bishop of Saint George's in Grenada in 1974
- Clyde Martin Harvey, appointed Bishop of Saint George's in Grenada in 2018
- Malcolm Patrick Galt, CSSp., appointed Bishop of Bridgetown in Barbados in 1995
- Francis Dean Alleyne, O.S.B., appointed Bishop of Georgetown in Guyana in 2003

== See also ==
- Pro-Cathedral of Our Lady of Perpetual Help, San Fernando
- Catholic Church in Trinidad and Tobago
