= Servreagh O'Folan =

Irish brehon (lawyer)

Servreagh O'Folan (fl.1585) was an Irish Brehon (a type of arbitrator).

O'Folan was a member of a Brehon family resident in Conmhaicne Mara (now Connemara) in the 16th century. They served as lawyers to members of the Ó Flaithbheartaigh's and other families in the region, but were also a land-owning and merchant family connected with The Tribes of Galway.

Servreagh O'Folan is listed as a Gentleman on a number of fiant in the 1580s.

The Composition Book of Connacht of 1585 listed him as a landowner in Moyrus in the Barony of Ballynahinch, County Galway.

Murrough na dTuadh Ó Flaithbheartaigh, the Chieftain of the O'Flaherty Clan came to Galway City and signed an Official Fiant in 1585 with "the Chief men of his countrie". Servreagh O'Folan was one of the men who signed the Fiant with him. In a fiant dated 1590, "Sirwrehagh Folain, of Moiris, Gentleman", was given a Royal Pardon following a rebellion in Connacht.

He appears to have also had three sons who were also Brehon lawyers:

- Soyrbrehagh Og Folain, in an indenture for John Kinge in May 1606, is described as "Soyrbrehagh Og Folain of Ierconnaght in the Co. of Galway atornies for seisin".
- Feargananim Folan, in a deed for the O'Flahertys in 1614, FFargananym McServreagh of Moyrish, is described as "our true and lawfull attorney", and signs as Forinan Folan. He is listed as owner of parcels of lands consisting of 3,678 acres (14.88 km^{2}), and 193 acres (0.78 km^{2}), and was dispossessed of the family lands in 1651.
- Nehemias folan of the Newtone, Gentleman, was also a landowner and Brehon lawyer. In a document titled "Carta Dermicci O'Halloran(Dermot Ó hAllmhuráin), A.D. 1594", written in Latin, he is described as "in Christo Nehemian Ffolan, generosum, meum attornatum".

== Other bearers of the name ==
Other O'Folan's from County Galway included:

- Salamon Folan was active during the Irish Rebellion of 1641, and was cited as one of the group of men led by Colonel Edmond O'Flaherty at the siege of Tromroe Castle in County Clare.
- Ferdindo Follin of Moyrus, Carna, County Galway, listed in 1656 as owner of parcels of lands consisting of 3,678 acres (14.88 km2), and 193 acres (0.78 km2). His lands were confiscated for rebellious activities and distributed to Sir Thomas Meredith and Richard Martin of Ballynahinch.
- Patrick Folan (Galway), killed at the Battle of Inkermann 5 November 1854, during the Crimean War[5].
- John Folan won the Distinguished Conduct Medal for Gallantry while serving in Mesopotamia in 1916 with the 3rd Battalion of the Connaught Rangers.
- Cormac Folan of Barna represented Ireland in Rowing at the 2008 Summer Olympics – Men's coxless four, at the 2008 Summer Olympics.
- Caleb Folan, is a Republic of Ireland forward, who made his senior debut against Cyprus in October 2008. He plays in the Football League Championship with Hull City, and qualifies for Ireland through his paternal Grandparents who are from Galway.
- Thomas Folan of Galway was the Prior of the Dominican Friary in Galway, and was the first recorded King of the Claddagh in the 1850s.

== See also ==
- Folan

== Bibliography ==
- A History of West or H-Iar Connacht Ruaidhrí Ó Flaithbheartaigh, Irish Archeological Society, Dublin, 1846
- Books of survey and distribution Vol. III. County of Galway, 1680
- Irish Families, Edward Mac Lysaght, Irish Academic Press, Dublin, 1985
- The Tribes of Galway, Adrian James Martyn, Galway, 2001.
