= Nehemias Folan =

- Born: 1 January 1555; Moyrus, Galway, Ireland
- Died: ? Ballydugan, Loughrea, Ireland
- Occupation: Brehon Lawyer
- Spouse: Catherine MacSwiney
- Relatives: Servreagh O'Folan

Nehemias Folan (1555–?) Irish Brehon.

He was an Irish Brehon Lawyer and was a Commissioner for the Composition of Connacht in 1585.

== Details ==
Folan was a member of a Brehon family resident in County Galway in the 16th century. They served as lawyers to members of the Ó Flaithbheartaigh's and other families in the region, but were also a land-owning and merchant family connected with The Tribes of Galway.

In a fiant, "Carta Dermicci O'Halloran, A.D. 1594", written in Latin, he is described as "in Christo Nehemian Ffolan, generosum, meum attornatum.

He was listed as a landowner of the Newtone, Gentleman, near Loughrea, County Galway, in a fiant, "Indentures of Composition, The Part of Connacht Called Clanrickard, A.D. 1585".

In a deed dated 1594, he purchased land from Dermot O'Shaughnessy for 100 pounds, to "To hold for ever of the chief lord of the fee, by the service thereout due and of right accustomed.

He also gave a deposition in a trial in 1615, concerning the inheritance of Sir Roger O'Shaughnessy and his sons, in Loughrea, County Galway. He is described as "Nehemias Folan, of Balladowgan, County Galway, Esquire, 60 years old.

In 1628, he donated a Silver Chalice to the Franciscan Killconnell Friary, Loughrea, in his memory and that of his wife, Catherine MacSwiney. This Chalice is still in existence.

He was the Son of Servreagh O'Folan, and appears to have also had two brothers who were also brehon lawyers.
Soyrbrehagh Og Folain, in an indenture for John Kinge in May 1606, is described as "Soyrbrehagh Og Folain of Ierconnaght in the Co. of Galway atornies for seisin".

Feargananim Folan, in a deed for the O'Flahertys in 1614, FFargananym McServreagh of Moyrish, is described as "our true and lawfull attorney", and signs as Forinan Folan. He is listed as owner of parcels of lands consisting of 3,678 acres (14.88 km^{2}), and 193 acres (0.78 km^{2}), and was dispossessed of the family lands in 1651.

== Other bearers of the name ==
Other O'Folan's from County Galway included:

- Salamon Folan was active during the Irish Rebellion of 1641, and was cited as one of the group of men led by Colonel Edmond O'Flaherty at the siege of Tromroe Castle in County Clare.
- Ferdindo Follin of Moyrus, Carna, County Galway, listed in 1656 as owner of parcels of lands consisting of 3,678 acres (14.88 km2), and 193 acres (0.78 km2). His lands were confiscated for rebellious activities and distributed to Sir Thomas Meredith and Richard Martin of Ballynahinch.
- Patrick Folan (Galway), killed at the Battle of Inkermann 5 November 1854, during the Crimean War[5].
- John Folan won the Distinguished Conduct Medal for Gallantry while serving in Mesopotamia in 1916 with the 3rd Battalion of the Connaught Rangers.
- Cormac Folan of Barna represented Ireland in Rowing at the 2008 Summer Olympics – Men's coxless four, at the 2008 Summer Olympics.
- Caleb Folan, is a Republic of Ireland forward, who made his senior debut against Cyprus in October 2008. He plays in the EFL Championship with Hull City, and qualifies for Ireland through his paternal Grandparents who are from Galway.
- Thomas Folan of Galway was the Prior of the Dominican Friary in Galway, and was the first recorded King of the Claddagh in the 1850s.

== See also ==
- Brehon
- Folan

== Bibliography ==
- The Compossicion Booke of Conought, A. Martin Freeman, (ed.), Dublin, 1936.
- A History of West or H-Iar Connacht Ruaidhrí Ó Flaithbheartaigh, Irish Archeological Society, Dublin, 1846
- Books of survey and distribution Vol. III. County of Galway, 1680
- Irish Families, Edward Mac Lysaght, Irish Academic Press, Dublin, 1985
- The Tribes of Galway, Adrian James Martyn, Galway, 2001.
- The Chalices and Books of Kilconnell Abbey, Brendan Jennings, Journal of the Galway Archaeological and Historical Society, Vol. 21, No. 1/2 (1944), Galway, 1944.
