= Folan =

Folan (Irish: Ó Cualáin or Ó Culáin), is an Irish family name. They were a Brehon family in County Galway. The Folan family are of Conmhaicne origin.

== Distribution ==
The surname Folan is most numerous in County Galway, particularly in the area between Galway City and Clifden, in Connacht, Ireland. In the Irish-speaking Gaeltacht of Galway the Irish language Gaelic spelling Ó Cualáin is frequently used.

== History ==
=== 16th Century Brehon Family ===
There was a Brehon family called O'Folan in County Galway in the sixteenth century.

- Servreagh O'Folan, Gentleman, signed a fiant in 1585, called "Indentures of Composition, The Country of the O'Flaherty's of Eyre Connacht, A.D. 1585", which referenced him as a landowner in Moyrus in the Barony of Ballynahinch, County Galway.
- Nehemias Folan of the Newtone, Gentleman, was listed as a landowner in Loughrea, County Galway, in a fiant dated 1585. In a fiant dated 1594 he is described in Latin as "in Christo Nehemian Ffolan, generosum, meum attornatum". In a 1615 trial concerning Sir Roger O'Shaughnessy in Loughrea, he was noted as "Nehemias Folan, of Balladowgan, County Galway, Esquire, 60 years old".
- Soyrbrehagh Og Folan, in an indenture dated May 1606, is noted as "Soyrbrehagh Og Folan of Ierconnaght in the Co. of Galway, atornie for seisin".
- Feargananim Folan, in a deed for the O'Flahertys in 1614, entitled "Donogh McMoyler et al., is dede A.D. 1614", is described as "our true and lawfull attorney", and signs as Forinan Folan.

=== Lands confiscated in 1651 ===
Several O'Folans are mentioned in Elizabethan era fiants as being pardoned for rebel activities.

- In fiants dated 1590, "Sirwrehagh Folain, of Moiris, Gentleman, Nehemiah Folain of Moyris, Boetius Folain, Mackragh Folain, Fernand Folain and Connor McSerally of Moyris", and "Nehenas Folone of Newtown, Co Galway", were all given Royal Pardons.
- Salamon Folan took part in the Irish Rebellion of 1641, and was one of the group of men led by Colonel Edmond O'Flaherty at the siege of Tromroe Castle in County Clare.
- Ferdinando Follin, (Feargananim Folan), of Moyrus, Carna, County Galway, was registered as owner of lands consisting of 3,678 acres (14.88 km^{2}), and 193 acres (0.78 km^{2}). Following the Cromwellian conquest of Ireland in 1651, his lands were confiscated.

== People with the surname ==
=== Contemporary people with the surname ===
- Dónall Ó Cualáin served as the Acting Garda Commissioner of An Garda Síochána, the Irish Police Service. He replaced outgoing Garda Commissioner Noirin O'Sullivan on her resignation in September 2017, and retired as Garda Commissioner in September 2018.
- Caleb Folan, was a Republic of Ireland forward, who made his senior debut against Cyprus in October 2008. He played in the Premier League with Hull City, and qualified for Ireland through his paternal Grandparents who are from Galway.
- Cormac Folan, Barna, County Galway, represented Ireland in Rowing at the 2008 Summer Olympics – Men's coxless four, at the 2008 Summer Olympics.
- Tony Folan was an Irish footballer during the 1990s and 2000s. He represented Ireland at every level up to Under-21 and "B".
- Lilias Folan, Cincinnati, Ohio, was a yoga pioneer in the US, and hosted the PBS television show Lilias, Yoga and You. The show was carried on the US TV Station PBS from 1972 until 1992. Named one of Yoga Journals 4 most influential figures in American Yoga over the past 100 years she is often referred to as "The First lady of Yoga" or "The Julia Child of Yoga". She still teaches in the USA.
- Seán Ó Cualáin and Eamonn Ó Cualáin are brothers and award-winning documentary producers and directors, they directed the award winning documentary Men at Lunch about an iconic photograph of construction workers on a New York skyscraper taken in 1932.
- Dáithi Ó Cualáin was elected as a member of Galway County Council in 2019, and Seosamh Ó Cualáin served as a member of Galway County Council between 2014 and 2019.
- William J Folan is an archaeologist and explorer, and is an expert on Mayan Archaeology who has worked on the Coba and Calakmul excavations.

=== People with the surname in military history ===
Many Folans served in the Connaught Rangers Regiment of the British Army.

- Patrick Folan was killed at the Battle of Inkermann 5 November 1854, during the Crimean War, while serving with the Connaught Rangers.
- John Folan won the Distinguished Conduct Medal in 1916 for Gallantry while serving in Mesopotamia during World War I with the 3rd Battalion of the Connaught Rangers.
- Patrick Folan was killed in action in the Gallipoli Campaign on 27 August 1915, his brother John Folan was Killed in Action in France in 1918, and Joseph Folan died in Mesopotamia in 1918. All were serving with the Connaught Rangers during World War I.
- Peter Folan died while serving with the Royal Navy in 1919.
- Joseph Folan was killed in action during World War II, while serving with the Royal Artillery in Malaysia, in April 1945.
- John Folan, serving with the New York, I Co, 6th HA Regiment, was killed in action at Spotsylvania Court House, VA on 19 May 1864 during the American Civil War.
- Bartholomew Folan, serving with the B Co, 16th Inf Regiment. NH died from disease at New Orleans, LA on 7 June 1863. during the American Civil War.
- James J Folan, from Boston, Massachusetts, served as 1st Lieutenant with the 48th Massachusetts Infantry Regiment, of the Union Army during the American Civil War.
- Captain A.H. Folan served with the 18th North Carolina Infantry Regiment of the Confederate Army during the American Civil War.
- Colonel John B. Folan flew during the Berlin Airlift in 1948, with the United States Air Force.
- Patrick Folan, Carna, Galway, was one of four members of the West Connemara Brigade of the IRA who were drowned on their way to a Brigade Battalion Meeting in Roundstone, Galway on 6 February 1920 during the Irish War of Independence .
- James Folan, Woodquay, Galway, was the Battalion Quarter-master of the Galway Brigade of the IRA during the Irish War of Independence.

=== Other people with the surname in history ===
- Dermot Folan was vicar of Moycullen and Kilcummin in 1628.
- Thomas Folan was the Prior of the Dominican Convent in Galway from 1865 to 1873, and was also King of the Claddagh up to his death in 1874.
