= James Hickey =

James Hickey may refer to:

- James Hickey (soldier) (born 1960), colonel in the US Army who earned notoriety during Operation Red Dawn
- James Hickey (Irish politician) (c. 1886–1966), Irish Labour party politician, TD and senator
- James Aloysius Hickey (1920–2004), Cardinal and Roman Catholic Archbishop of Washington
- James Patrick Hickey (born 1973), President of the Orlando fire protection district
- James Hickey (Fenian) (c. 1837–1885), Irish Fenian and Land Leaguer
- James Hickey (Australian politician) (1878–1932), Australian trade unionist and politician

== See also ==
- Jim Hickey (disambiguation)
- James Augustus Hicky (died 1802), Irishman who launched Hicky's Bengal Gazette, the first newspaper in India, in 1780
