= Canali (surname) =

Canali is an Italian surname. Notable people with the surname include:

- Francesco Canali (1764–1835), Italian cardinal
- Mario Canali, Italian painter
- Mauro Canali, Italian historian
- Nicola Canali (1874–1961), Italian cardinal
