= Padge =

Padge is both a given name and surname. Notable people with the name include:

- Padge Kehoe (1926–2007), Irish hurler
- Padge King (fl. 1892), Mayor/King of the Claddagh in Ireland
- Michael Paget (born 1978), Welsh musician, singer, songwriter, and guitarist
- Willi Padge (1943–2023), German rower
