= Martin Oliver (captain) =

Martin Oliver was captain of the brig, St. John, fl. 1849.

Oliver was a member of a maritime family from The Claddagh, Galway. He was the captain of the brig, St. John, when it was wrecked on Grampus Ledge, on the coast of Massachusetts in October 1849 with the loss of over one hundred lives. The passengers were mainly refugees from the west coast of Ireland, fleeing the Great Famine. The Boston Daily Bee of 9 October 1849, stated:

Capt. Oliver and his surviving mate reached this city at 12 o'clock. He states that he made Cape Cod Light about 5 o'clock Saturday evening, Scituate Light near 1 o'clock Sunday morning, then stood away to the northward, to clear the land, for about three hours. Then, it being about daylight, he tacked the ship and stood S.S.W. Weather very thick, he came inside of Minot's Light House, and there saw a brig lying at anchor, just inside of breakers, at a place called Hooksett Rock, tried to wear up to the brig, but found he could not fetch up, and threw over both anchors, which dragged. He then cut away her masts, and she drifted on to Grampus Ledge, where she went to pieces.

Previous to breaking up, the jolly boat was hanging by the tackle, alongside, when the stern ringbolt broke and the boat fell into the water. The Captain, second mate and two boys jumped in to get her clear, when about 25 passengers jumped in and swamped her. The twenty-five, together with the second mate and two boys, perished. The captain caught a rope hanging over the quarter, and was drawn on board by the first mate. When the long boat was got clear, a number of passengers jumped over to swim to her, but all perished. The captain, first mate (Mr. Crawford), and seven of the crew swam to and reached the boat.

Oliver's subsequent life is uncertain, and it is unknown if he ever again commanded a ship. The Martin family are still residents of The Claddagh. A later member of his family, also named Martin Oliver (d.1972), was named ceremonial King of the Claddagh in the 1960s.
