= Latin Archbishopric of Larissa =

The Latin or Roman Catholic Archbishopric of Larissa is a titular see of the Catholic Church. It was established briefly as a residential episcopal see at Larissa, Thessaly, during the first decades of the Frankokratia period in place of the Greek Orthodox Metropolis of Larissa. Following the recovery of Larissa by the Greeks, the see became titular. The see has been vacant since the death of its last incumbent, Giuseppe Mojoli, in 1980.

== History ==
Christianity penetrated early to Larissa, though its first bishop is recorded only in 325 at the Council of Nicaea. Following the Fourth Crusade and Thessaly's incorporation into the Kingdom of Thessalonica, a Roman Catholic archbishop was installed in the place of the previous Greek Orthodox occupant.

The city was soon recovered by the Greek Despotate of Epirus, however, possibly as early as 1212 and the Greek Orthodox metropolitan restored. Pope Honorius III later conferred the see of Thermopylae to the exiled Latin archbishop.

== Titular bishops ==
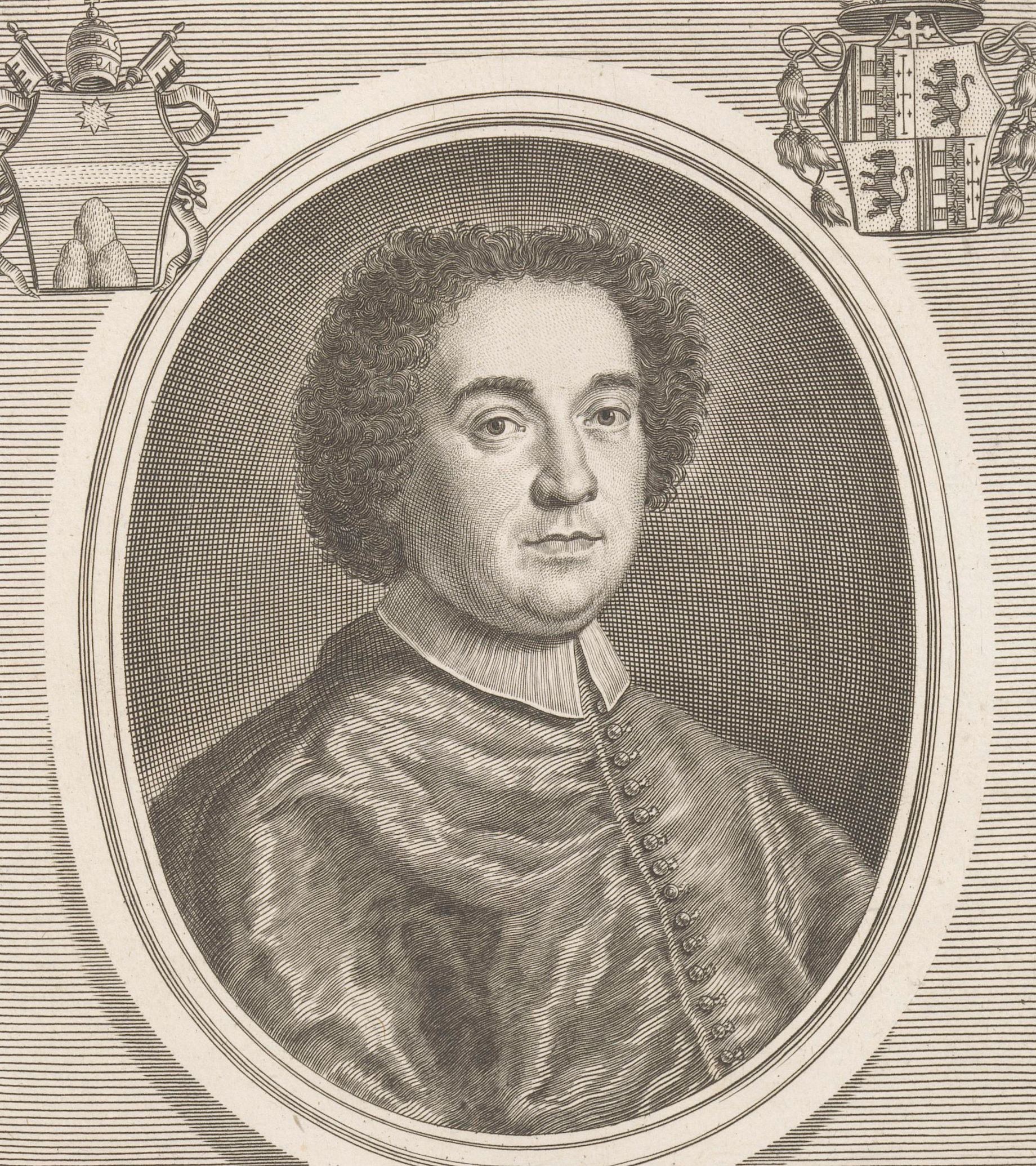
Francesco Acquaviva

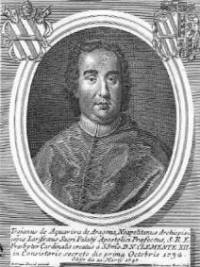
Troiano Acquaviva d'Aragona.

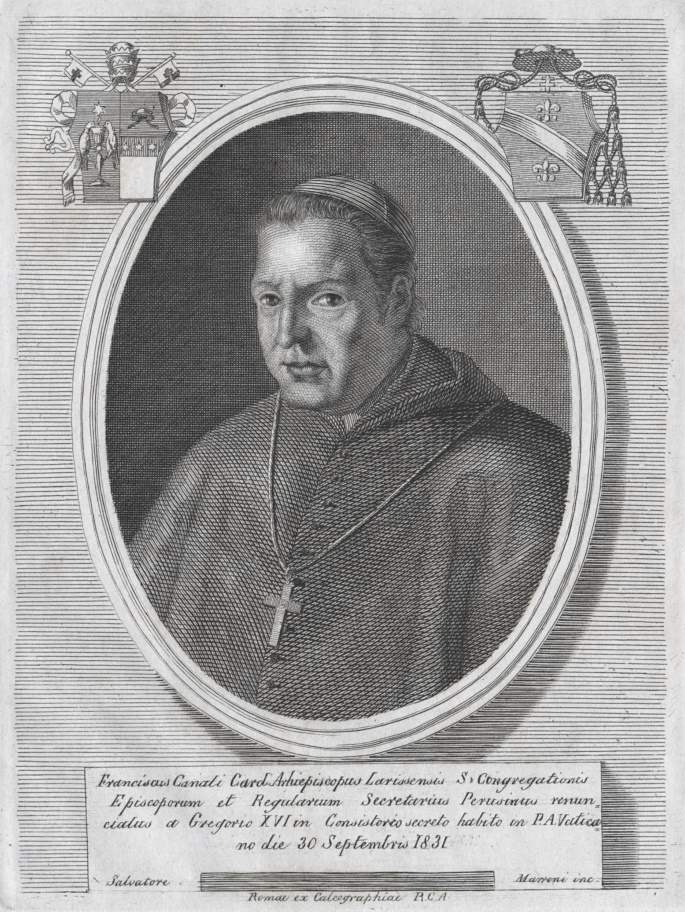
Francesco Canali

- Honore Visconti, 1630
- Antonio Pignatelli del Rastrello, later became Pope Innocent XII, 1652
- Johann Hugo von Orsbeck, 1672
- Baldassare Cardinal Cenci (Sr.), 1691
- Francesco Acquaviva d’Aragona, 1697
- Giovanni Battista Anguisciola, 1706
- Luigi Carafa (Jr.), 1713
- Troiano Acquaviva d’Aragona, 1930
- Giovanni Saverio di Leoni, 1733
- Bernardo Froilán Saavedra Sanjurjo, 1736
- Pedro Clemente de Aróstegui, 1742
- Blasius Paoli, 1750
- Francesco Saverio Passari, 1786
- Salvatore Maria Caccamo, OSA, 1815
- Francesco Canali, 1827
- Giuseppe Novak, 1843
- François-Marie-Benjamin Richard, 1875
- Giovanni Rebello Cardoso de Menezes, 1887
- Agostino Ciasca, OSA, 1891
- Diomede Angelo Raffaele Gennaro Falconio, OFM, 1899
- Carlo Montagnini, 1913
- Antonio Maria Grasselli, OFMConv, 1913
- Felipe Arginzonis y Astobiza, OCD, 1918
- Domenico Spolverini, 1933
- José Horacio Campillo Infante, 1939
- Antonio Giordani, 1956
- Giuseppe Mojoli, 1960

== See also ==
- List of Catholic titular sees

== Sources ==
- Miller, William (1921). Essays on the Latin Orient. Cambridge: Cambridge University Press.
- Nicol, Donald MacGillivray (2010), The Despotate of Epiros 1267–1479: A Contribution to the History of Greece in the Middle Ages, Cambridge University Press, ISBN 978-0-521-13089-9
