= Jim Hickey =

Jim or Jimmy Hickey may refer to:

- Jim Hickey (1940s pitcher) (1920–1997), pitcher in Major League Baseball
- Jim Hickey (American football) (1920–1997), American football and basketball player, coach, and college athletics administrator
- Jim Hickey (baseball, born 1961), pitching coach and former minor league baseball pitcher
- Jim Hickey (broadcaster) (born 1949), weather presenter for TVNZ in New Zealand
- Jim Hickey Jr. (born 1940), American Olympic bobsledder
- Jimmy Hickey Jr. (born 1966), member of the Arkansas State Senate

== See also ==
- James Hickey (disambiguation)
