= Thomas Grady (VC) =

- Born: 18 September 1835; Claddagh, County Galway
- Died: 18 May 1891 (aged 55); South Melbourne, Victoria, Australia
- Burial place: Melbourne General Cemetery
- Military career
- Allegiance: United Kingdom
- Branch: British Army
- Service years: 1853–1856
- Rank: Sergeant
- Units: 4th Regiment of Foot
- Conflicts: Crimean War
- Awards: Victoria Cross; Distinguished Conduct Medal

Thomas Grady VC DCM (Irish: Tomás Ó Grádaigh; 18 September 1835 – 18 May 1891) was born in Claddagh, County Galway and was an Irish recipient of the Victoria Cross, the highest and most prestigious award for gallantry in the face of the enemy that can be awarded to British and Commonwealth forces.

== Details ==
He was 19 years old, and a private in the 4th Regiment of Foot (later The King's Own (Royal Lancaster) Regiment), British Army during the Crimean War when the following deed took place for which he was awarded the VC.

On 18 October 1854 at Sebastopol, the Crimea, Private Grady volunteered to repair the embrasures of the Sailors' Battery on the Left Attack and carried out this task under very heavy fire from a line of batteries. On 22 November during the repulse of a Russian attack, although severely wounded, Private Grady refused to leave the front and his example encouraged the weak force which was engaging the enemy to maintain their position.

== Further information ==
He emigrated to Australia and died in South Melbourne, Victoria on 18 May 1891. Grady is buried in Melbourne General Cemetery.

Some references incorrectly state he was promoted sergeant. He was discharged as a private, his award was gazetted as a private and his pension was paid as a private.

== The medal ==
His Victoria Cross is displayed at the Australian War Memorial (Canberra, Australia).
