= Privy seal =

Personal seal of a reigning monarch

Privy Seal of King Rama IX of Thailand

A privy seal is the personal seal of a reigning monarch, used to authenticate official documents of a personal nature, in contrast to a great seal, which is used for documents of greater importance.

== Privy Seal of England ==
The Privy Seal of England can be traced back to the reign of King John. It has been suggested that it was originally the seal that accompanied the person of the Sovereign, while the Great Seal was required to remain in the Chancery. Eventually, the Privy Seal took on a broader function and was replaced by the Signet as the king's personal seal. The Great Seal Act 1884 (47 & 48 Vict. c. 30) effectively ended the use of the Privy Seal in England by providing that it was no longer necessary for any instrument to be passed under the Privy Seal.

== Privy Seal of Scotland ==
There is also a separate Privy Seal of Scotland, which existed from at least the reign of Alexander III.

Article XXIV of the Treaty of Union provided that

the Privy Seal ... now used in Scotland be continued But that the said Seals be altered and adapted to the State of the Union as Her Majesty shall think fit And the said Seals and all of them and the Keepers of them shall be subject to such regulations as the Parliament of Great Britain shall hereafter make...

The Seal was last used in 1898 to execute the commission appointing the Rev. James Cooper to a Regius Chair at the University of Glasgow, but has never been abolished. The office of Keeper of the Privy Seal has not been filled since the death of the Marquess of Breadalbane in 1922.

== Privy Seal of Ireland ==
The "signet or privy seal" of the Kingdom of Ireland was a single seal, whereas in England and Scotland the signet was a separate seal kept by the Clerk of the Signet and Keeper of the Signet respectively. Fiants were issued under the privy seal or signet seal by the Keeper of the Signet or Privy Seal to authorise the issue of letters patent by the Lord Chancellor of Ireland under the Great Seal of Ireland.

Keeper of the Signet or Privy Seal of Ireland
Dates	Holder	Notes
1560–1795	Secretary of State for Ireland	Held by as a separate office from the Secretaryship under the same letters patent.
22 June 1795 – 1797	Edmund Pery, Lord Glentworth	While Thomas Pelham was Secretary of State
24 July 1797–1801	Robert Stewart, Lord Castlereagh	Appointed Chief Secretary for Ireland in November 1798.
12 June 1801–8 May 1829	Charles Abbot, latterly 1st Baron Colchester	Appointed Chief Secretary in February 1801 and Secretary of State on 12 June 1801. Vacated both when appointed Speaker of the UK Commons in 1802 but remained Keeper until his death.
8 May 1829–19 October 1922	Chief Secretary for Ireland	The Chief Secretary was ex officio the Keeper under the Public Offices (Ireland) Act 1817 (57 Geo. 3. c. 62).

== Privy Seal of Japan ==
Privy seal of Japan (天皇御璽)

The Privy Seal of Japan is the official seal of the Emperor of Japan. While it is printed on many state documents, it is separate from the State Seal of Japan. The Privy Seal was made from copper beginning in the Nara period. After the Meiji Restoration, a new seal was made from stone in 1868. The present seal was made from gold in 1874.

The Seal has been kept by the Chamberlain of Japan since 1945, when the office of Lord Keeper of the Privy Seal was abolished. The Lord Keeper was a personal adviser to the Emperor, a position adapted in 1885 from the earlier post of Naidaijin.
