= San Clemente, Rome =

Roman Catholic basilica, a landmark of Rome, Italy

Saint Clement
- San Clemente (Italian); Sancti Clementis (Latin)
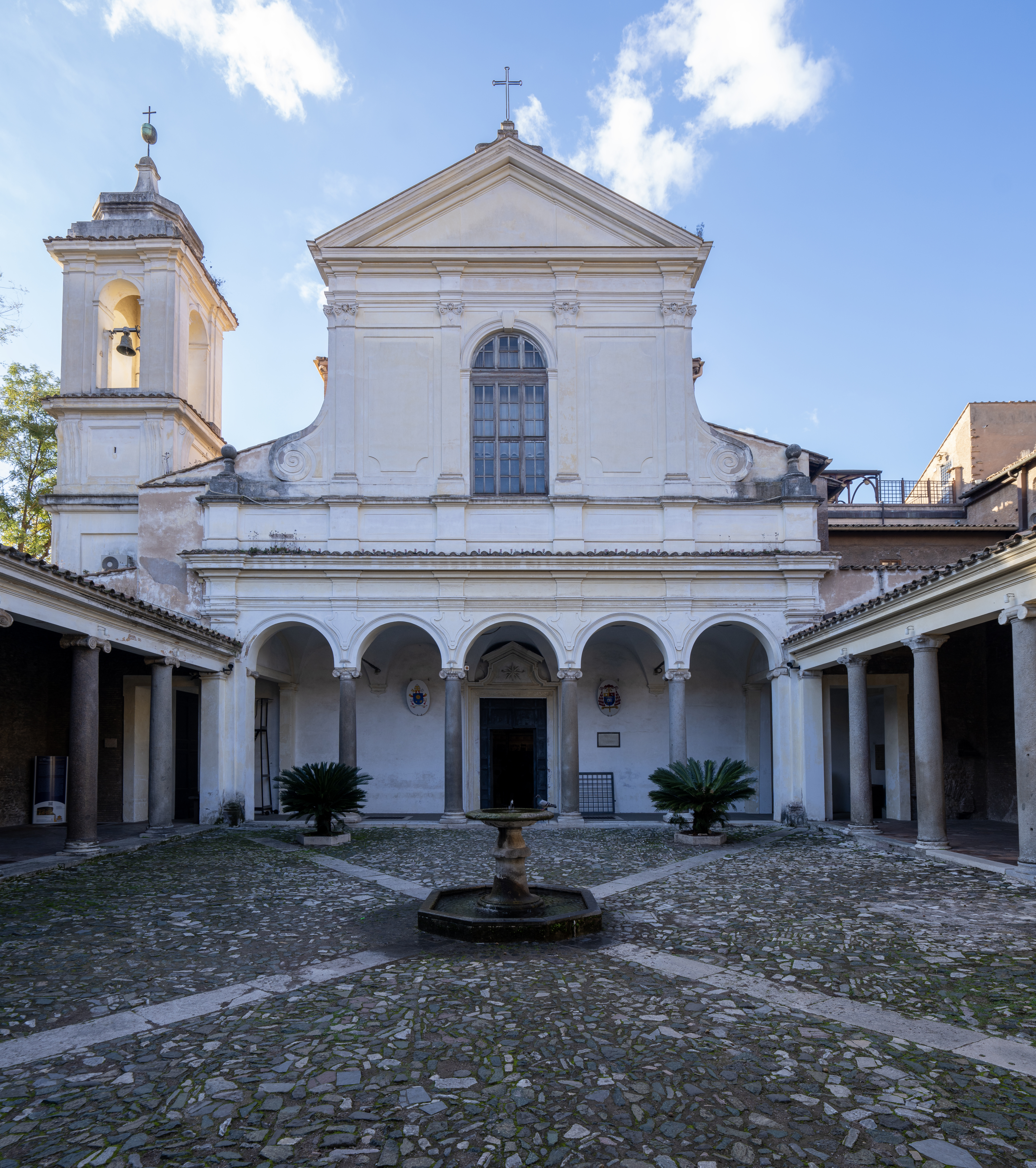
- Courtyard of the Basilica of Saint Clement
- Click on the map for a fullscreen view
- 41°53′22″N 12°29′51″E
- Location: Rome
- Country: Italy
- Denomination: Catholic Church
- Sui iuris church: Latin Church
- Religious order: Dominicans
- Website: www.basilicasanclemente.com

History
- Status: Basilica, titular church, Irish national church
- Dedication: Pope Clement I

Architecture
- Architectural type: Church
- Style: Paleochristian, Romanesque
- Groundbreaking: 1108
- Completed: 1123

Specifications
- Length: 45 metres (148 ft)
- Width: 25 metres (82 ft)

The Basilica of Saint Clement (Italian: Basilica di San Clemente al Laterano) is a Latin Catholic minor basilica dedicated to Pope Clement I located in Rome, Italy. Archaeologically speaking, the structure is a three-tiered complex of buildings: (1) the present basilica built just before the year 1100 during the height of the Middle Ages; (2) beneath the present basilica is a 4th-century basilica that had been converted out of the home of a Roman nobleman, part of which had in the 1st century briefly served as an early church, and the basement of which had in the 2nd century briefly served as a mithraeum; (3) the home of the Roman nobleman had been built on the foundations of republican era villa and warehouse that had been destroyed in the Great Fire of AD 64.

== History ==
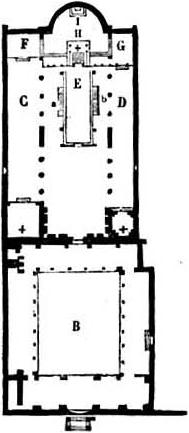
Plan of the church

This ancient church was transformed over the centuries from a private home that was the site of clandestine Christian worship in the 1st century to a grand public basilica by the 6th century, reflecting the emerging Catholic Church's growing legitimacy and power. The archaeological traces of the basilica's history were discovered in the 1860s by Joseph Mullooly, Prior of the house of Irish Dominicans at San Clemente (1847–1880).

=== Before the 4th century ===
The lowest levels of the present basilica contain remnants of the foundation of a possibly republican era building that might have been destroyed in the Great Fire of 64. An industrial building – probably the imperial mint of Rome from the late 1st century A.D. onwards (because a similar building is represented on a 16th-century drawing of a fragment of the Severan marble plan of the city), was built or remodelled on the same site during the Flavian period. Shortly after an insula, or apartment block, was also built. It was separated from the industrial building by a narrow alleyway. About a hundred years later (c. 200) a mithraeum, a sanctuary of the cult of Mithras, was built in the courtyard of the insula. The main cult room (the speleum, "cave"), which is about 9.6m long and 6m wide, was discovered in 1867 but could not be investigated until 1914 due to lack of drainage. The exedra, the shallow apse at the far end of the low vaulted space, was trimmed with pumice to render it more cave-like.

Central to the main room of the sanctuary was found an altar, in the shape of a sarcophagus, and with the main cult relief of the tauroctony (the image of Mithras slaying a bull) on its front face. The torchbearers Cautes and Cautopates appear on respectively the left and right faces of the same monument. A dedicatory inscription identifies the donor as one pater Cnaeus Arrius Claudianus, perhaps of the same clan as Titus Arrius Antoninus' mother. Other monuments discovered in the sanctuary include a bust of Sol kept in the sanctuary in a niche near the entrance, and a figure of Mithras petra generix, i.e. Mithras born of the rock. Fragments of statuary of the two torch bearers were also found . One of the rooms adjoining the main chamber has two oblong brickwork enclosures, one of which was used as a ritual refuse pit for remnants of the cult meal. All three monuments mentioned above are still on display in the mithraeum. A fourth monument – a statue of St. Peter found in the speleum's vestibule and still on display there – is not of the mysteries.

=== 4th–11th century ===
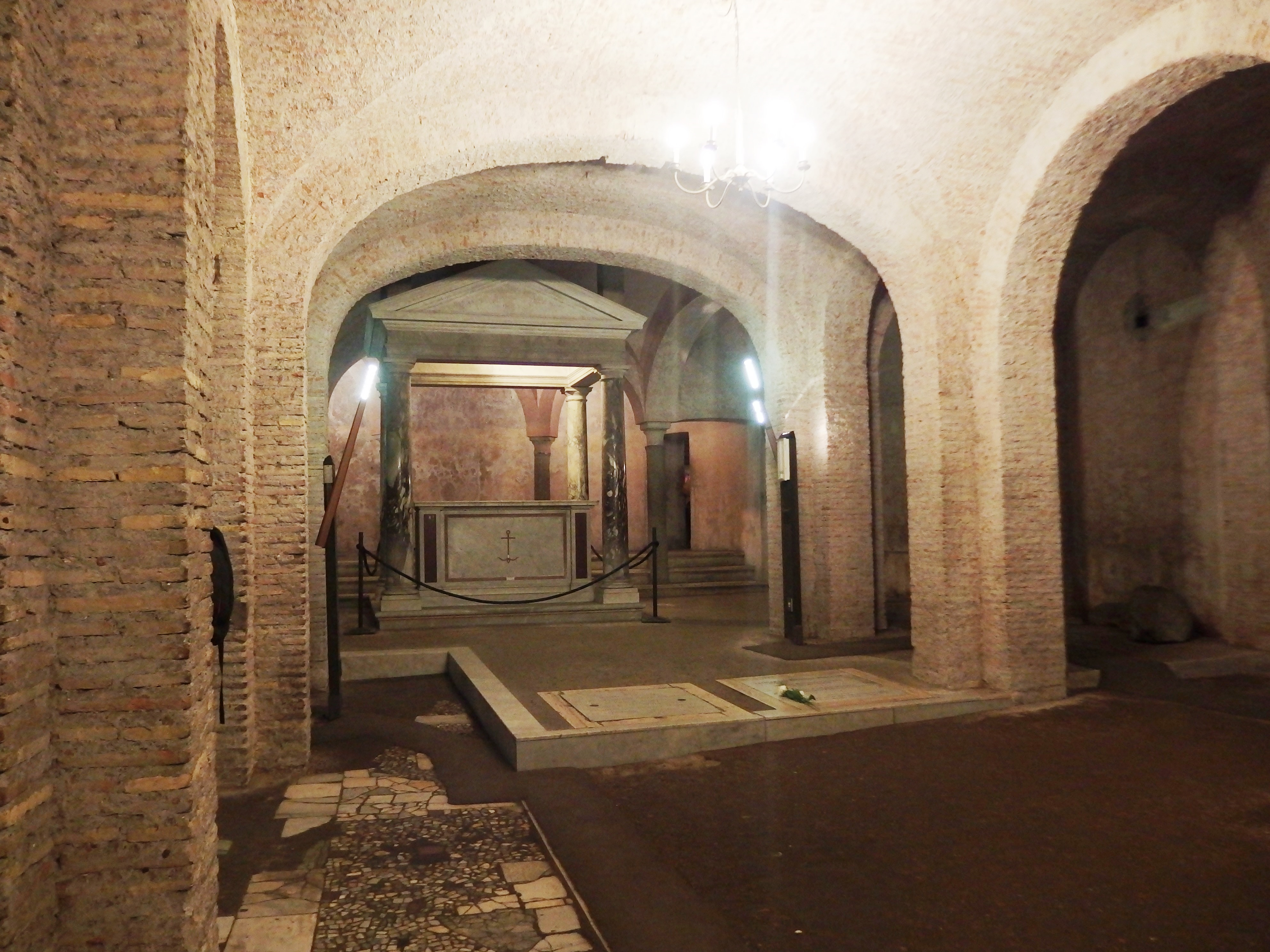
The lower basilica

At some time in the 4th century, the lower level of the industrial building was filled in with dirt and rubble and its second floor remodeled. An apse was built out over part of the domus, whose lowest floor, with the Mithraeum, was also filled in. This "first basilica" is known to have existed in 392, when St. Jerome wrote of the church dedicated to St. Clement, i.e. Pope Clement I, a 1st-century AD Christian convert and previously considered by patrologists and ecclesiastical historians to be identical with Titus Flavius Clemens. Restorations were undertaken in the 9th century and ca 1080–99.

The early basilica was the site of councils presided over by Pope Zosimus (417) and Symmachus (499). The last major event that took place in the lower basilica was the election in 1099 of Cardinal Rainerius of St Clemente as Pope Paschal II.

Apart from those in Santa Maria Antiqua, the largest collection of Early Medieval wall paintings in Rome is to be found in the lower basilica of San Clemente.

Four of the largest frescoes in the basilica were sponsored by a lay couple, Beno de Rapiza and Maria Macellaria, at some time in the last third of the 11th century and focus on the life, miracles, and translation of St. Clement, and on the life of St. Alexius. Beno and Maria are shown in two of the compositions, once on the façade of the basilica together with their children, Altilia and Clemens (puerulus Clemens, i.e. "little boy Clement"), offering gifts to St. Clement, and on a pillar on the left side of the nave, where they are portrayed on a small scale witnessing a miracle performed by St. Clement. Below this last scene is one of the earliest examples of the passage from Latin to vernacular Italian: a fresco of the pagan Sisinnius and his servants, who think they have captured St. Clement but are dragging a column instead. Sisinnius encourages the servants in Italian Fili de le pute, traite! Gosmari, Albertel, traite! Falite dereto colo palo, Carvoncelle!, which, translated into English means: "Come on, you sons of bitches, pull! Come on, Gosmari, Albertello, pull! Carvoncello, give it to him from the back with the pole!" The saint speaks in Latin, in a cross-shaped inscription: Duritiam cordis vestris, saxa trahere meruistis, which means "You deserved to drag stones due to the hardness of your hearts."

Art historians have long regarded Beno de Rapiza and Maria Macellaria as partisans of the now-canonical 'reform' popes Gregory VII, Urban II, and Paschal II and the frescoes as reform-party propaganda. However, if the paintings date to the 1080s or 1090s, as many art historians believe, then Beno and Maria may instead have favoured the Antipope Clement III (Wibert of Ravenna), whom they sought to honour through paintings about the early Christian pope of the same name.

=== The second basilica ===
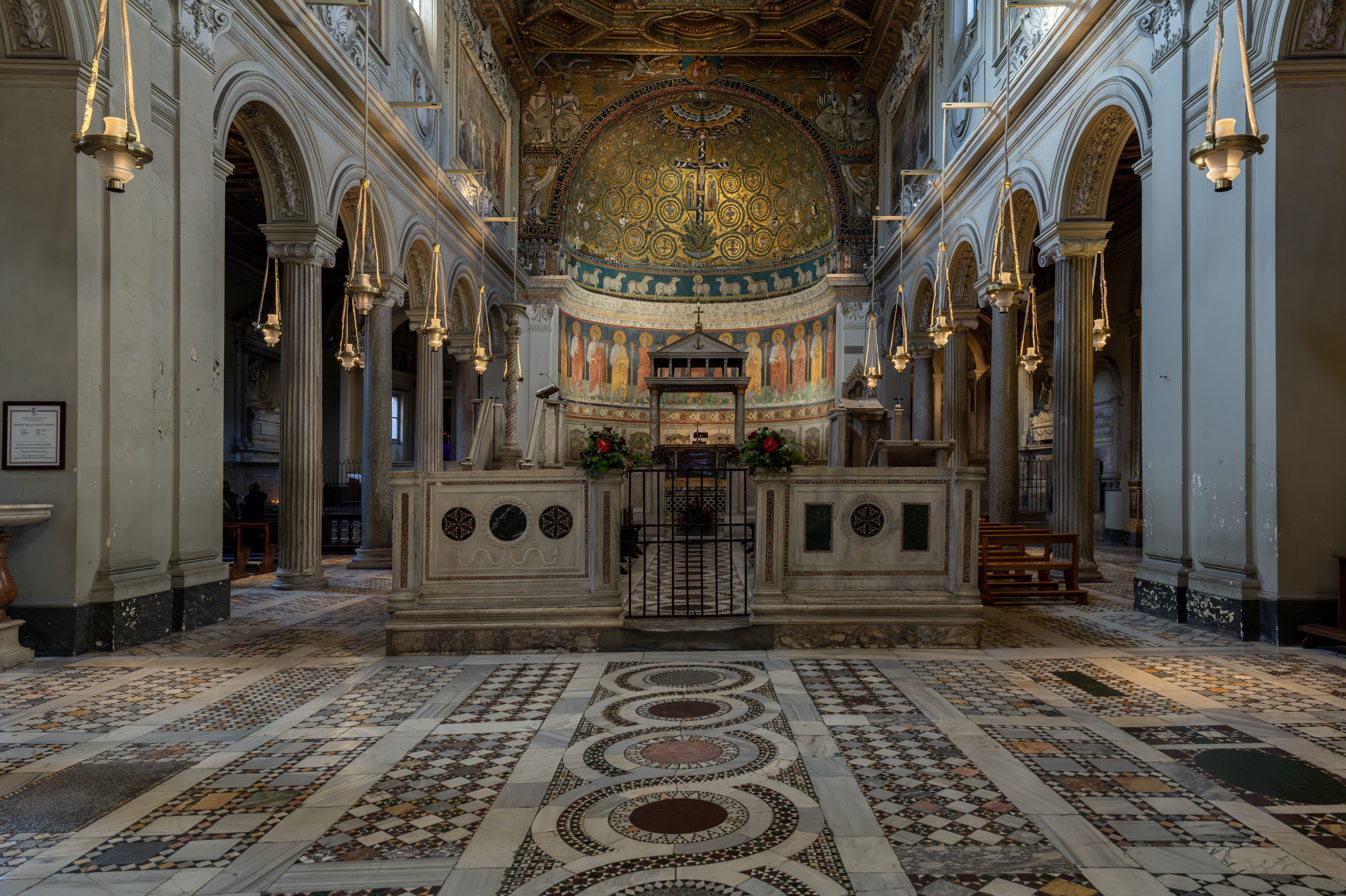
Interior of the second basilica

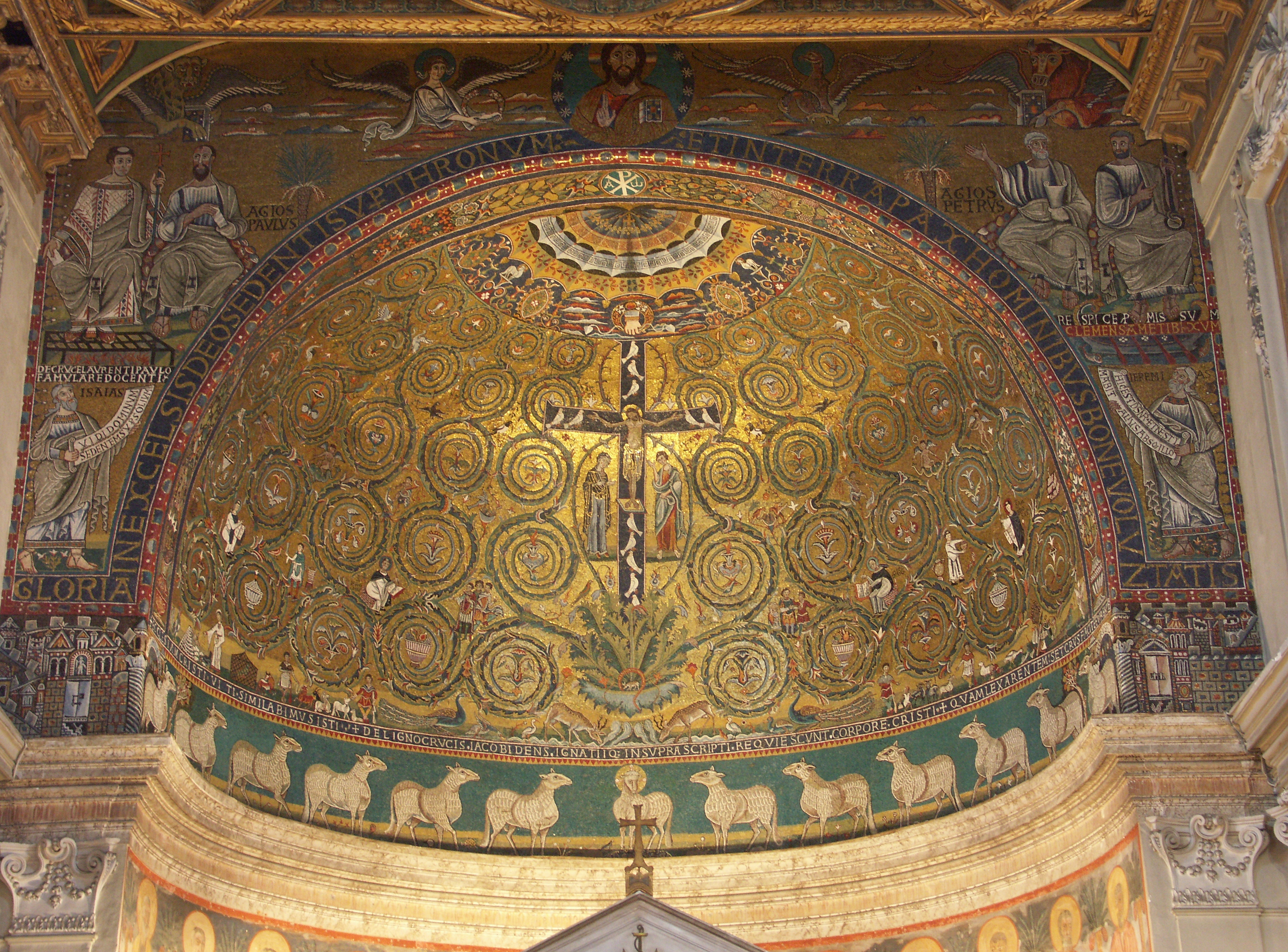
Apse mosaic, San Clemente, c.1200, showing a common form of Byzantine arabesque motif of scrolled acanthus tendrils

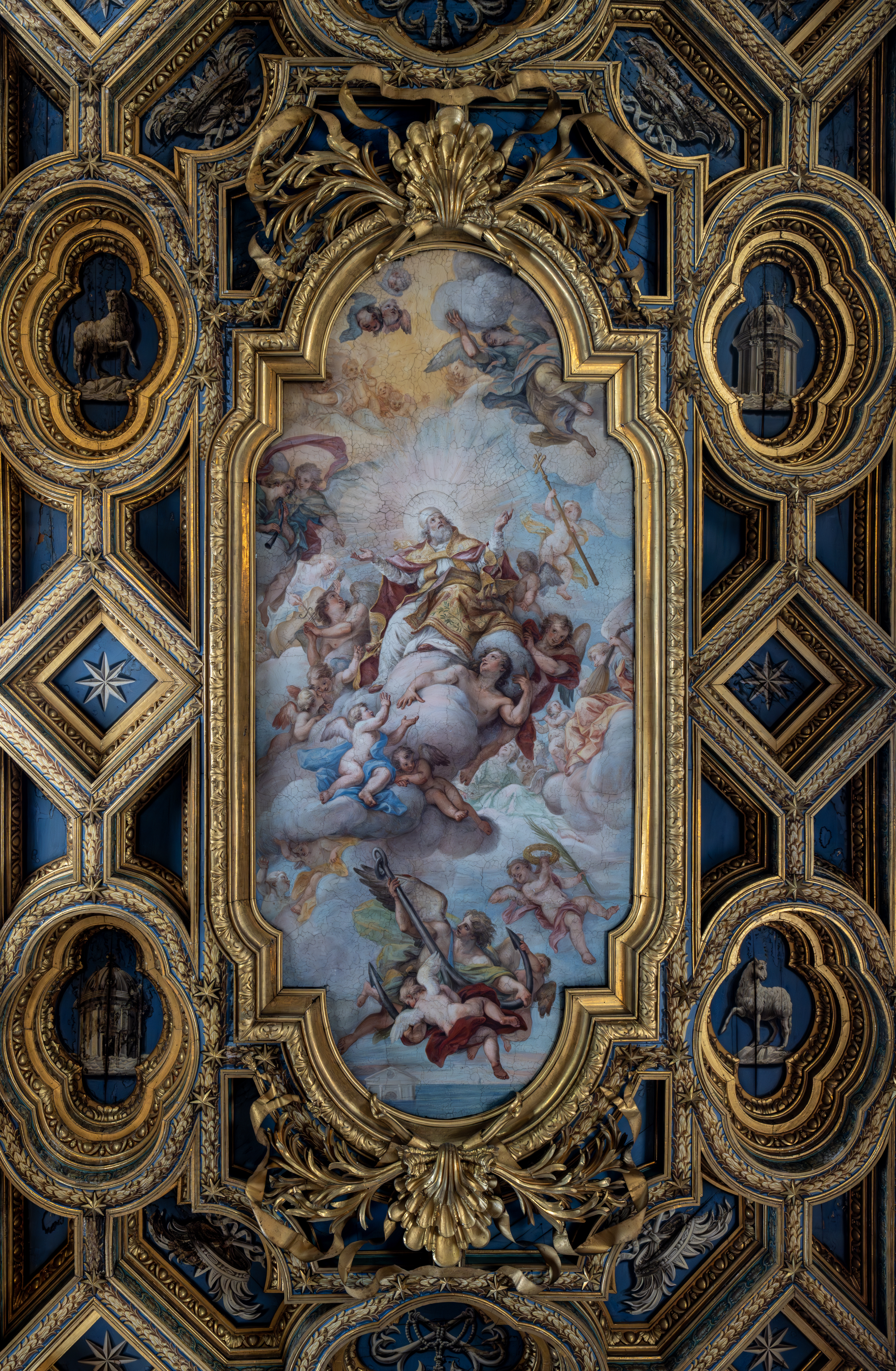
Wooden ceiling

The current basilica was rebuilt in one campaign by Cardinal Anastasius, ca 1099-ca. 1120. A now-outdated hypothesis held that the original church had burned out during the Norman sack of the city under Robert Guiscard in 1084, but no evidence of fire damage in the lower basilica has been found to date. One possible explanation is that the lower basilica was filled in and the new church built on top due to the close association of the lower structure with the imperial opposition pope ("antipope") Clement III / Wibert of Ravenna. Today, it is one of the most richly adorned churches in Rome. The ceremonial entrance (a side entrance is ordinarily used today) is through an atrium (B on plan) surrounded by arcades, which now serves as a cloister, with conventual buildings surrounding it. Fronting the atrium is the chaste facade of Carlo Stefano Fontana (nephew of Carlo Fontana), supported on antique columns, and his little campanile (illustration). The basilica church behind it is in three naves divided by arcades on ancient marble or granite columns, with Cosmatesque inlaid paving. The 12th-century schola cantorum (E on plan) incorporates marble elements from the original basilica. Behind it, in the presbytery is a ciborium (H on plan) raised on four gray-violet columns over the shrine of Clement in the crypt below. The episcopal seat stands in the apse, which is covered with mosaics on the theme of the Triumph of the Cross that are a high point of Roman 12th century mosaics.

Chiesa di S. Clemente etching by Giuseppe Vasi (1753)

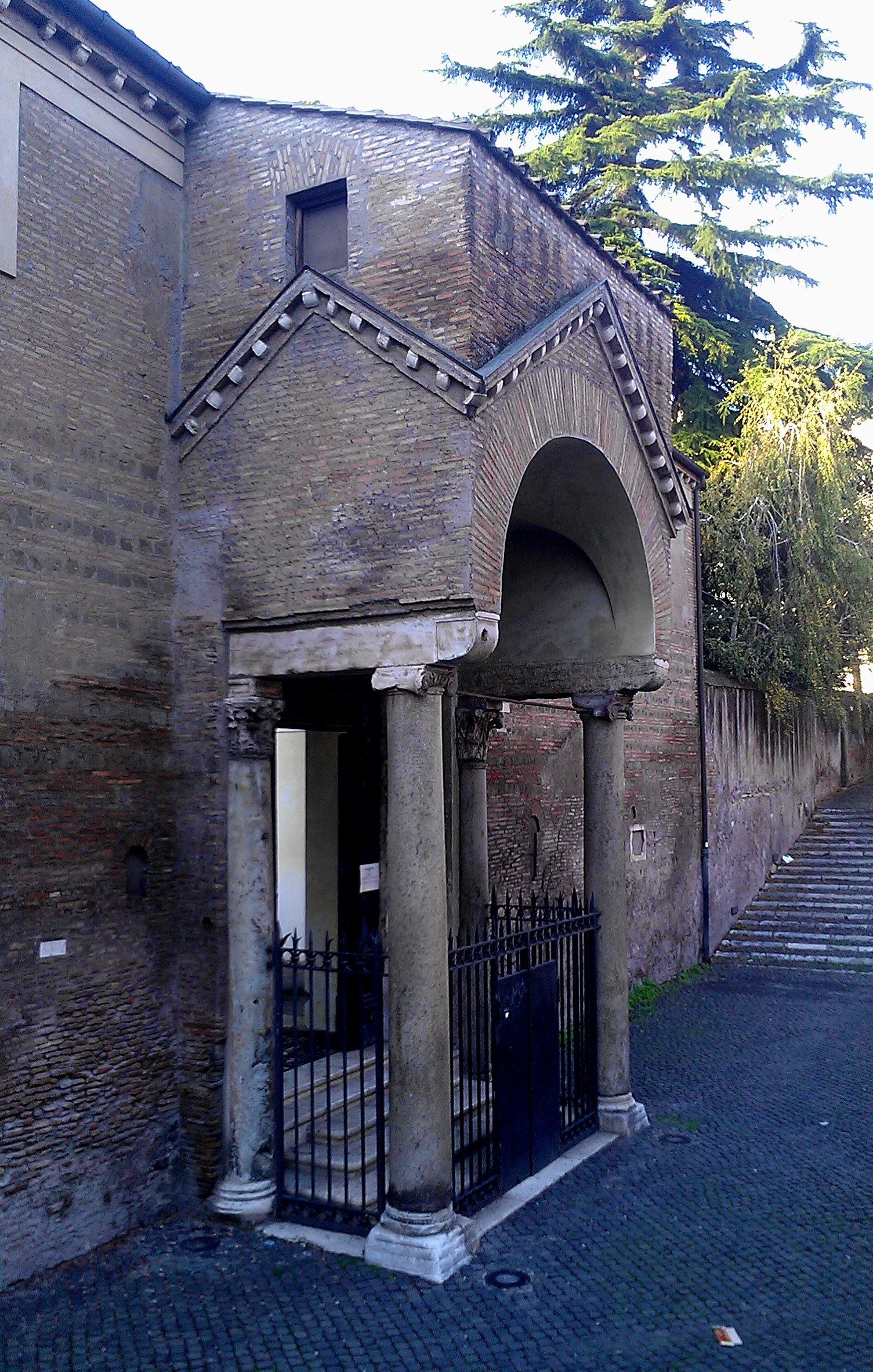
Main entrance to the basilica

Irish Dominicans have owned the Basilica of San Clemente and the surrounding building complex since 1667. Pope Urban VIII gave them refuge at San Clemente, where they have remained, running a residence for priests (Italian: Collegio San Clemente Padri Domenicani Irlandesi a Roma) studying and teaching in Rome. The Dominicans themselves conducted the excavations in the 1950s in collaboration with Italian archaeology students.

On one wall in the atrium is a plaque affixed by Pope Clement XI in 1715, praising the Basilica of St. Clement, "This ancient church has withstood the ravages of the centuries." Clement undertook restorations to the venerable structure, which he found dilapidated. He selected Carlo Stefano Fontana as architect, who erected a new facade, completed in 1719. The carved and gilded coffered ceilings of nave and aisles, fitted with paintings, date from this time, as do the stucco decor, Ionic capitals and frescos.

The inscriptions found in S. Clemente, a valuable source illustrating the history of the Basilica, have been collected and published by Vincenzo Forcella.

In one lateral chapel, there is a shrine with the tomb of Saint Cyril of the Saints Cyril and Methodius, who translated the Bible into Slavic language, created the Glagolitic alphabet, and Christianized the Slavs. Pope John Paul II used to pray there sometimes for Poland and the Slavic countries. The chapel also holds a Madonna by Giovanni Battista Salvi da Sassoferrato.

The current position of Cardinal Priest of the Titulus S. Clementi is Arrigo Miglio. Pope Paschal II (1076–1099) was one of the previous holders of the titulus.

During the Second World War, Jewish religious services were conducted in the Basilica di San Clemente, since it was under Irish diplomatic protection, under a painting of Tobias.

== List of Cardinal Protectors ==
This Basilica is the seat of the cardinalatial title of Sancti Clementi.

- Hugo Candidus (1049–1078?)
- Rainero di Bleda, O.Cist. (1078-1099)
- Anastasius of S. Clemente (1102–1125)
- Uberto Rossi Lanfranchi, (1125-1137)
- Lucio Boezio, (1138–1144)
- Bernardo, (1145–1158)
- Vernavero, (1170–1178)
- Pietro, (1188–1188)
- Giovanni, (1189–1199)
- Pietro Peregrosso, (1289–1295)
- Guillaume de Ferrières (cardinal), (18 September 1294 – 7 September 1295)
- Giacomo Tomasi Caetani, OFM (17 December 1295 – 1 January 1300)
- Bernard de Garves, (18 June 1316 – 1328)
- Pierre Bertrand, (20 December 1331 – 23 June 1349)
- Gil Alvarez de Albornoz, (17 December 1350 – December 1356)
- Guillaume de la Jugié, (22 April 1368 – 28 April 1374)
- Pierre de la Jugié, (22 December 1375 – 19 November 1376)
- Gérard du Puy, (3 February 1377 – 14 February 1389)
- Poncello Orsini, (18 September 1378 – 2 February 1395)
- Gabriele Condulmer, (9 May 1408 – 1426)
- Hugues de Lusignan, (11 March 1431 – 20 April 1431)
- Francesco Condulmer, (19 September 1431 – April 1445)
- Enrico Rampini, (16 December 1446 – 4 July 1450)
- Giovanni Castiglione (cardinal), (9 March 1457 – 14 April 1460)
- Giacopo Antonio Venier, (3 December 1476 – 3 August 1479)
- Domenico della Rovere, (13 August 1479 – 22 April 1501)
- Jaime Serra I Cau, (28 June 1502 – 20 January 1511)
- Francesco Argentino, (17 March 1511 – 23 August 1511)
- Giulio de Medici, (26 June 1517 – 6 July 1517)
- Luigi de' Rossi, (6 July 1517 – 20 August 1519)
- Domenico Giacobazzi, (20 August 1519 – 1528)
- Andrea Matteo Palmieri, (21 November 1527 – 20 January 1537)
- Girolamo Ghinucci, (25 January 1537 – 3 July 1541)
- Gian Pietro Carafa, (6 July 1541 – 24 September 1543)
- Rodolfo Pio, (24 September 1543 – 17 October 1544)
- Pietro Bembo, OBE (17 October 1544 – 19 January 1547)
- Juan Alvarez de Toledo, OP (24 January 1547 – 4 December 1551)
- Giovanni Battista Cicala, (4 December 1551 – 7 November 1565)
- Gianantonio Capizucchi, (7 November 1565 – 28 January 1569)
- Luigi Cornaro, (9 February 1569 – 9 June 1570)
- Giovanni Antonio Serbelloni, (9 June 1570 – 3 July 1570)
- Stanislaw Hozjusz, (3 July 1570 – 9 July 1578)
- Gianfrancesco Gambara, (9 July 1578 – 17 August 1579)
- Mark Sittich von Hohenems, (17 August 1579 – 5 December 1580)
- Alfonso Gesualdo, (5 December 1580 – 4 March 1583)
- Prospero Santacroce, (4 March 1583-2 March 1589)
- Vincenzo Lauro, (2 March 1589 – 17 December 1592)
- Flaminio Piatti, (15 March 1593 – 10 June 1596)
- Gian Francesco Biandrate di San Giorgio Aldobrandini, (21 June 1596 – 16 July 1605)
- Carlo Conti, (17 August 1605 – 7 January 1613)
- Jean de Bonsi, (20 July 1615 – 3 March 1621)
- Desiderio Scaglia, OP (3 March 1621 – 9 February 1626)
- Giovanni Domenico Spinola, (9 February 1626 – 11 August 1646)
- Marcantonio Franciotti, (17 August 1637 – 19 December 1639)
- Vincenzo Maculani, OP (10 February 1642 – 16 February 1667)
- Innico Caracciolo (seniore), (18 July 1667 – 30 January 1685)
- Ferdinando d'Adda, (10 April 1690 – 2 October 1696)
- Tommaso Maria Ferrari, OP (2 January 1696 – 20 August 1716)
- Annibale Albani, (6 July 1722 – 24 July 1730; 24 July 1730 – 21 October 1751)
- Cosimo Imperiali, (10 December 1753 – 12 February 1759)
- Gian Francesco Albani, (12 February 1759 – 21 July 1760)
- Carlo Rezzonico (iuniore), (24 January 1763 – 14 December 1772)
- Francesco Carafa della Spina di Traetto, (26 April 1773 – 15 September 1788)
- Stefano Borgia, (3 August 1789 – 23 November 1804)
- Benedetto Naro, (29 April 1816 – 6 October 1832)
- Benedetto Cappelletti, (17 December 1832 – 15 May 1834)
- Francesco Canali, (1 August 1834 – 11 April 1835)
- Pietro Ostini, (21 November 1836 – 3 April 1843)
- Antonio Maria Cadolini, (22 June 1843 – 1 August 1851)
- Domenico Lucciardi, (18 March 1852 – 13 March 1864)
- Henri-Marie-Gaston Boisnormand de Bonnechose, (22 September 1864 – 28 October 1883)
- Guglielmo Sanfelice d'Acquavilla, (24 March 1884 – 3 September 1897)
- Guillaume-Marie-Romain Sourrieu, (24 March 1898 – 16 June 1899)
- Gennaro Portanova, (22 June 1899 – 25 April 1908)
- William Henry O'Connell, (30 November 1911 – 22 April 1944)
- John Joseph Glennon, (22 June 1946 – 9 March 1946)
- Johannes de Jong, (12 October 1946 – 8 September 1955)
- Amleto Giovanni Cicognani, (18 December 1958 – 23 May 1962)
- Lawrence Joseph Shehan, (25 May 1965 – 26 August 1984)
- Adrianus Johannes Simonis (25 May 1985 – 2 September 2020)
- Arrigo Miglio (27 August 2022 – present)

== Priors ==
- Paul Lawlor (since 2021)
- Stephen Hutchinson (2019–2021)
- Thomas McCarthy (2015–2018)
- John M. Cunningham (2012–2015)
- Terence Crotty (2011–2012)
- Michael Dunleavy (2008–2011)
- John M. Cunningham (2005–2008)
- (William) Luke Dempsey OP, prior (1974–1977) and (1999–2002)
- Ambrose Duffy OP, prior (1968–1974)
- Anselm Moynihan OP, prior (1962–1968)
- Henry Peel OP, prior (1959–1962)
- Leo Lennon OP, prior (1953–1959)
- Isidore McArdle OP, prior (1949–1953)
- Raymond M. Dowdall OP, (1940–1949) spent 21 years in San Clemente, prior for 9 years
- Michael Browne OP, Irish Dominican prior (1925–1930) became Cardinal
- Thomas (James) Crotty OP, prior for two periods (1905–1911)
- Thomas Nicholas Burke OP, prior (1864–1867), returned to Ireland a prior of Athenry
- Thomas Folan OP, Irish Dominican prior (1857–1858)
- Joseph Mullooly OP, archaeologist, Irish Dominican superior/prior (1850–1857)
- Thomas Mullins OP, Irish Dominican prior (1848–1850)
- Joseph Taylor OP, prior (1807–18??)
- John Connolly OP, STM, prior (1787–1784), later served as Bishop of New York
- Richard Luke Concanen OP, prior (1782–1787), later served as Bishop of New York
- John Troy OP, prior/rector(1772-77), later Bishop of Ossory, and Archbishop of Dublin
- Ambrose MacDermott OP, served as prior at the college of Saints Sixtus and Clemente (1686 to 1689)
- Nicholas Lynch OP, prior of San Sisto Vecchio (1634)

== Relics ==
The coat of arms of the basilica, which combines that of the Order of Preachers with the anchor of Saint Clement and his Latin initials (Sanctus Clemens).

- Pope Saint Clement I (relics)
- Saint Ignatius of Antioch (relics)
- Saint Cyril the Philosopher (relics)

== The Basilica di San Clemente in fiction ==
- The "Basilica of S. Tommaso in Pallaria", a primary setting in Ngaio Marsh's novel When in Rome (1970), is modelled closely on S. Clemente.
- The crypto-thriller The Sword of Moses by Dominic Selwood (Corax, London, 2013, ISBN 978-0992633202) has several scenes set on all three levels of the Basilica di San Clemente: the upper basilica, the lower basilica, and the Roman mithraeum.
- The third part of Andre Aciman's 2007 novel Call Me By Your Name is named after the Basilica. The book also contains a fictional poem, "San Clemente Syndrome,” referred to by the poet whom the protagonist, Elio Perlman, meets at a book store in B, and again at a book party in Rome.

== Bibliography ==
- Mullooly, Joseph (2007), Saint Clement: Pope and Martyr and His Basilica in Rome, Reprint from 1st edition in 1873, Kessinger Publishing, LLC, ISBN 978-0-548-77854-8
- Leonard E Boyle; Eileen M C Kane; Federico Guidobaldi; Luke Dempsey, San Clemente miscellany / 2, Art and archaeology (Romae : apud S. Clementem, 1978).
- Joan Barclay Lloyd, The Medieval Church and Canonry of S. Clemente in Rome (Rome: San Clemente, 1989) [San Clemente miscellany, 3].
- Federico Guidobaldi; Claudia Barsanti; Alessandra Guiglia Guidobaldi, San Clemente (Romae : San Clemente, 1992).
- Papandrea, James L. (8 October 2012), Rome: A Pilgrim's Guide to the Eternal City, Cascade Books, ISBN 978-1-61097-268-0.
- John Melville-Jones; "The Location of the Trajanic Mint at Rome", The Numismatic Chronicle Vol. 175, 2015, 137–45.

| Preceded by Santi Celso e Giuliano | Landmarks of Rome; San Clemente, Rome | Succeeded by Santi Cosma e Damiano |
