= Lilias, Yoga and You =

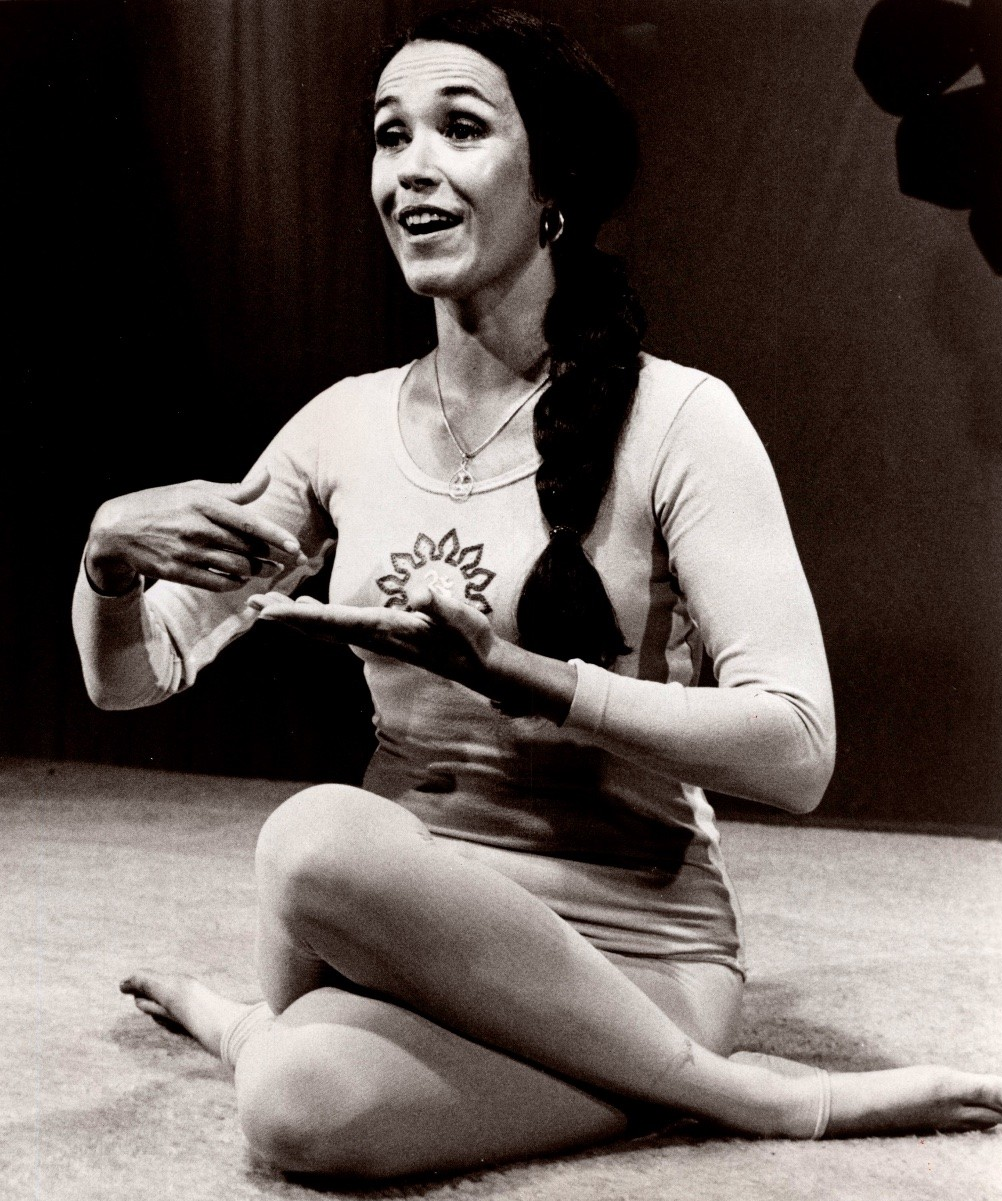
- Publicity photo of host Lilias Folan for the show
- Genre: Exercise
- Created by: Lilias Folan
- Presented by: Lilias Folan
- Country of origin: United States
- Original language: English
- No. of episodes: 500

Production
- Production company: WCET Cincinnati

Original release
- Network: PBS
- Release: October 5, 1970 – 1999

Related
- Lilias! Yoga Gets Better With Age

Lilias, Yoga and You (later shortened to Lilias!) is a PBS television show hosted by Lilias Folan, a Cincinnati, Ohio-based practitioner of yoga as exercise. The show first aired on October 5, 1970 on Cincinnati PBS member station WCET and three years later was carried on PBS across the United States, where it ran until 1999.

== Yoga presenter ==
Lilias Folan (1936–2026) began to practice yoga as exercise in 1964, and was soon teaching at the YWCA in Stamford, Connecticut. She studied asanas under the yoga masters T. K. V. Desikachar, B. K. S. Iyengar, and Angela Farmer, and gained wider knowledge of yoga under the Sivananda Yoga masters Swami Vishnudevananda and Swami Satchidananda. She joined the Connecticut ashram of the Divine Life Society led by Swami Chidananda. In the 1980s she met Swami Muktananda, creator of Siddha Yoga, who told her to teach meditation. Through her show she became known to Americans as the "First Lady of Yoga". She was married with two sons and seven grandchildren. Folan died on March 9, 2026, at the age of 90.

== Lilias! Yoga Gets Better With Age ==
WCET premiered Lilias! Yoga Gets Better With Age in March 2006, highlighting Folan's career and exploring the impact yoga has on the mind, body and spirit.

== Books and other media ==
Folan has published four books: Lilias, Yoga and You (1972), Lilias, Yoga and Your Life (1981), Lilias! Yoga Gets Better With Age (2005), and Lilias! Yoga: Your Guide to Enhancing Body, Mind, and Spirit in Midlife and Beyond (November 1, 2011).

Several VHS and DVD recordings of her yoga routines have been released, plus an audio-only book, Lilias Yoga Complete (1987), and one meditation CD, The Inner Smile (1998).

== Music ==
The music playing during the show's opening credits was "The Valley of the Bells" from Maurice Ravel's Miroirs.

== See also ==
- Folan (surname)

== Sources ==
- Gates, Janice (2006). Yogini: Women Visionaries of the Yoga World. Mandala. ISBN 978-1932771886.
- Schneider, Carrie (2003). American Yoga | The paths and practices of America's greatest yoga masters. Barnes & Noble. ISBN 978-0760745588.
