= Guillaume-Marie-Romain Sourrieu =

French prelate

His Eminence Guillaume-Marie-Romain Sourrieu
- Cardinal, Archbishop of Rouen
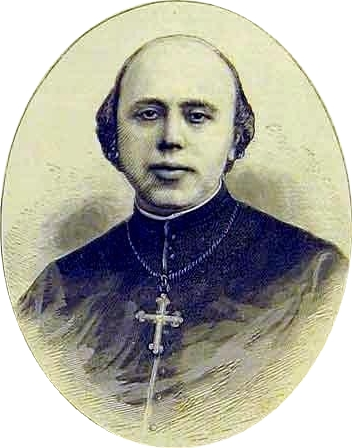
- Church: Catholic Church
- Archdiocese: Rouen
- Appointed: 21 May 1894
- Term ended: 16 June 1899
- Predecessor: Léon-Benoît-Charles Thomas
- Successor: Edmond-Frédéric Fuzet
- Other post: Cardinal-Priest of San Clemente (1898-99)
- Previous post: Bishop of Châlons (1882-94)

Orders
- Ordination: 17 October 1847
- Consecration: 30 November 1882 by Pierre-Alfred Grimardias
- Created cardinal: 19 April 1897 by Leo XIII
- Rank: Cardinal-Priest

Personal details
- Born: Guillaume-Marie-Romain Sourrieu; 27 February 1825 Aspet, Bagnères-de-Luchon, Saint-Gaudens, Haute-Garonne, Kingdom of France
- Died: 16 June 1899 (aged 74) Rouen, French Third Republic
- Buried: Rouen Cathedral
- Parents: Bertrand Sourrieu; Jeanne Marie Dencausse
- Motto: In Te speravi ("In You I trust")
- Coat of arms

Guillaume-Marie-Romain Sourrieu (27 February 1825 – 16 June 1899) was a French prelate of the Catholic Church who was Bishop of Châlons from 1882 to 1894 and Archbishop of Rouen from 1894 until his death. He was made a cardinal in 1897.

== Biography ==
Guillaume-Marie-Romain Sourrieu was born on 27 February 1825 at Aspet. He studied at the Junior Seminary of Polignan in Gourdan-Polignan. He was ordained priest of the Diocese of Toulouse on 17 October 1847. In that diocese, he was the confessor of the religious of the Sacred Heart of Jesus, as well as diocesan missionary and superior of a religious house. In the Diocese of Cahors he was chaplain of the sanctuary of Rocamadour and an honorary canon of the Cahors cathedral.

He was appointed bishop of Châlons on 25 September 1882. He received his episcopal consecration on 30 November in Rocamadour from Pierre-Alfred Grimardias, Bishop of Cahors. He was named archbishop of Rouen on 21 May 1894.

Pope Leo XIII created him a cardinal on 19 April 1897 and granted him the title of San Clemente on 24 March 1898.

He died on 16 June 1899 in Rouen and was buried in the cathedral there.
