= Nicholas Blake (Dominican) =

Nicholas Blake (fl. 1698–1702) was a member of the Dominican Order.

Blake was a member of one of the families called the Tribes of Galway, and was part of the Dominican community expelled from the Claddagh, near the town of Galway, in 1698.

In 1702 he returned with two fellow Dominicans, Prior Gregory French and Fr. Daniel MacDonnell. Due to the Penal Laws and their earlier expulsion, any one of them could be deported if arrested. Blake escaped, but his companions were captured. French was expelled and died in Italy, McDonnell died in 1707 in Galway.

Blake "expressed his loneliness in a poem in classical Latin" called "Here Lone I Live". It is a very rare example of a poem of this genre from the west of Ireland in the 18th century.

== See also ==
- Catholic Church in Ireland
