= Eóin Concannon =

Irish town leader

Eóin Concannon, died 1954, king of the Claddagh.

== Biography ==
Concannon was the last of the old-type kings. The Claddagh village had changed greatly during and after World War I, with many of its men joining the British forces, their ships lying idle. By 1941, only eighteen Galway Hookers sailed from the Claddagh. His death signaled the end of the Old Claddagh, and, as the need for a new king did not arise, one was not elected. Only in August 1971, in conjunction with the Claddagh Festival, was a new, honorary king elected.

Preceded by Padge King	King of the Claddagh ?–1954	Succeeded by Martin Oliver
