= Padge King =

Padge King (fl. 1892) was Mayor/King of the Claddagh.

== Biography ==
King was one of the earliest recorded Kings of the Claddagh. The Galway Vindicator of 12 May 1887 stated that "This custom of appointing their own ruler prevails among the Claddagh folk at the present day, with the difference that, in place of an annual election, the distinction seems to have become vested in one family, whose name, curiously enough, is King."

The Vindicator described the then King, Padge King:

"The present head of the Claddagh, Padge King, is a man a little over middle height, grave and quiet in manner, with an honest, earnest look, like that of a man who thinks a good deal and does not talk much; a something in his face, a good, kind look in his eyes, makes one wish to shake hands with him, and he has the natural ease and refinement of manner so often met with in our people."

A photograph exists of King, his wife and one of his sons, who later became a sailor and was killed in the Battle of Jutland in 1916.

| Preceded by Very Rev. Fr. Folan | King of the Claddagh; 1887–? | Succeeded by Eóin Concannon |
