= James Patrick Hickey =

James Patrick Hickey (born February 22, 1973) is the President of the Orland Fire Protection District, (OFPD), one of the largest Fire Protection Districts in the State of Illinois and the Midwest. The Orland Fire Protection District covers Orland Township, the Village of Orland Park, the Village of Orland Hills, unincorporated areas of Orland Township, and parts of Tinley Park.

Hickey was first elected to serve a six year term on the OFPD in 2009 as a trustee, and was elected as the board's president in 2010. As the new president of the board, Hickey and the board cut the District's budget by more than $2 million during the first year.

Born in Chicago, Illinois, he attended St Adrian Grammar School, St. Laurence High School, DePaul University (BA Liberal Arts), and graduated from Benedictine University with an MBA and concentrations in Finance & Accounting. He's the director of business development (real estate) for Peace Village, a senior citizens community in Palos Park, but before that was a partner in a mortgage and real estate business. Hickey grew up on the Southwest Side of Chicago in St. Adrian Parish near 71st Street and Western Avenue "where my parents and grandparents had lived."

Hickey has also run several times for public elective office including in the Democratic Primary election for the new 11th Congressional District in 2012, which was won by Democrat and incumbent Congressman Bill Foster. The 11th District includes the municipalities of Joliet, Aurora, Naperville, Burr Ridge, Woodridge, Darien, Bolingbrook and Plainfield, but does not include Orland Park or the OFPD. During his election, he proposed eliminating the interest paid by students on government loans to college students as a means of assisting college students.

In December 2013, he announced his intention to run for the United States Congress in the 2nd Congressional District, the seat formerly held by former Congressman Jesse Jackson, but later withdrew.

Hickey also was a surprise candidate for a seat on the Cook County Board in the 17th District to challenge three-term incumbent Cook County Commissioner Elizabeth Doody Gorman. But Hickey, a Democrat, and Gorman, a Republican commissioner and GOP Committeeman of Orland Township, are political allies. Hickey was unchallenged in the March 18, 2014 Democratic Primary and is the Democratic nominee for the November 4, 2014 general election. Hickey said he entered the race for the 17th District Cook County Board believing that Gorman, his ally who was a key supporter in Hickey's election, was planning to run for higher office and that he would only seek Gorman's seat in the November 4, 2014 Illinois general election if she retired.

Hickey is the past president of Toastmasters International (2005–2006).

He is divorced and has four children.
