= Mario Canali =

Italian painter (born 1952)

Mario Canali (born 1952) is an Italian digital artist and painter. He began his artistic career in 1975 as a painter. Shortly thereafter, he turned his attention to electronic and digital art and is considered one of the pioneers of that art form.

== Biography ==
From 2085 to 1996, together with his colleagues Flavia Alman, Sabine Reiff and Riccardo Sinigaglia, he was part of the Correnti Magnetiche Research and Electronic Art Group. The works produced by the group received many awards at such international exhibitions as SIGGRAPH in Los Angeles, Ars Electronica in Linz, Imagina in Monte Carlo and Nastro d'Argento in Rome.

In 1989, Mr. Canali was awarded the Immagine Elettronica Prize in Ferrara for his pioneering work in electronic art. In 1993, working in collaboration with acclaimed computer scientist Marcello Campione, he created Satori, a revolutionary installation that featured the usage of immersive virtual reality for artistic and expressive purposes.

In 1994, he founded Studio Canali with the goal of creating interactive installations capable of sensing psychophysical parameters and expressing that data as displays of light, sound, images and video. Assisted by psychologist Elio Massironi, computer scientist Marcello Campione and cabinet maker Leonardo Aurelio, he created a series of innovative works that combined art with science and technology. These displays were experienced and enjoyed by thousands of people in a wide range of venues ranging from museums to private parties.

Since 1998, the company has focused on creating interactive installations enhanced by the use of technologies and the diffusion of digital thought as a means of promoting social interactions. In 1999 he designed the Cultural Entertainment Centre in an abandoned industrial area in Sesto San Giovanni in conjunction with the Reload Cultural Association.

From 2000 to 2002, he created and managed Ludiialydis with performer Xena Zupanic: a psycho-bar, meeting place, experimentation and event production centre. In 2003 - 2004 he began the Arcnaut project, organizing a series of events focused on the conceptual understanding of art, science and philosophy and the interaction of these dynamics. In 2004 he began the restoration of a facility in Milan that would serve as a show space for these creative projects as well as house his research and development activities. The new Studio Canali is both a residence and a public meeting place; A painting studio and a research facility; An art gallery and an exhibition space. It was inaugurated in the spring of 2007.

Mr. Canali also serves as a guest lecturer at the Multimedia Department of Brera Fine Arts Academy and ‘Cognitive Environments and Emotional Sceneries’ at the Digital Environment Design Master of the NABA Academy of Arts and Design in Milan where he lectures on such topics as "Art and the Paradigms of Complexity".
