= Joseph Mullooly =

Irish Dominican Roman Catholic priest and archaeologist

Joseph Mullooly (19 March 1812 – 25 June 1880) was an Irish Dominican Roman Catholic priest and archaeologist from Lehery, Lanesborough, County Longford, Ireland. He is noted for excavating the temple of Mithras, (a Zoroastrian and Vedic deity widely venerated in the Roman Empire dating from the reign of Nero) beneath the Basilica of San Clemente in Rome.

In 1849, Mullooly became lector in Sacred Theology at the College of Saint Thomas in Rome, the future Pontifical University of Saint Thomas Aquinas, Angelicum.

Mullooly wrote Saint Clement, Pope and Martyr, and His Basilica in Rome about the excavation project at San Clemente. "Mullooly’s courage and desire to preserve ancient artefacts can be noted in his defence of the Basilica of San Clemente from destruction. When Garibaldi’s revolutionary forces took over Rome in 1848, Mullooly defended his church even after the Pope fled the Vatican".

To emphasise, San Clemente as a Dominican house of studies and as an Irish national college, and under the protection of Queen Victoria, he branded it ‘Collegium Hiberniae Dominicanae de Urbe’.

Princess Alice of Great Britain and Ireland and later Grand Duchess of Hesse mentions in a letter dated 9 April 1873 to her mother, Queen Victoria, that Joseph Mullooly had shown her around San Clemente during her visit to Rome in April 1873: "We visited San Clemente two days ago, and Father Mulooly [sic] took us through the three churches - one under the other"

== See also ==
- Dominicans in Ireland
