= Thomas Folan =

Irish local leader

Thomas Dominic Folan
- Title: Prior of St Mary's Dominican Priory, Galway City

Personal life
- Born: 1810 Rahoon, Galway, Ireland
- Died: 1874 (aged 63–64)

Religious life
- Religion: Roman Catholic
- Ordination: 24 June 1827

Senior posting
- Based in: Ireland
- Period in office: 1865–1873
- Predecessor: Joseph Mullooly
- Previous post: Prior of San Clemente, Rome

Thomas D Folan (1810–1874) was an Irish local leader who served as King of the Claddagh.

== Biography ==
Folan was a Dominican priest, and a native of Galway City. He was the Prior of St Mary's Dominican Priory, Galway City. He was previously Prior of San Clemente, Rome, and succeeded Joseph Mullooly as Prior in November 1857.

He was born in Rahoon, Galway in 1810 and was the son of James Folan and Honoria Costello. He studied at Perugia (1827–9) where he received minor orders, at Lucca (1829–31) where he was made subdeacon, and at San Clemente (1831–3), receiving diaconate and priesthood at the Lateran (1832), and at the Minerva (1833–4) where he graduated S.T.L. before returning to Ireland in Oct. 1834. Res. Galway, 1834–49, where he was prior from 1841 to 1847 and for some months in 1849.

He served as prior of Dublin (1849–52), of Galway (1852–7) and of S. Clemente for one year (1857–8). He was a resident of Galway from 1858 until death, being prior again, 1865–73. He died outside Galway on 28 June 1874, but was buried in the Dominican vault at the Claddagh. His Italian diary, notebook, passports and official appointments are in the provincial archives at Tallaght.

== King of the Claddagh ==
He was the earliest King of the Claddagh known by name. He had held the post for many years.

In September 1851, he interceded in a dispute between Claddagh fishermen and the Galway Port Authorities, to prevent civil unrest as food was being exported from Galway Docks, according to the Galway Mercury Newspaper.

The Galway Vindicator of 12 May 1887 stated:

"The King of the Claddagh has passed away. The late Very Rev. Fr. Folan, who, having made many valiant efforts to advance the interests of the poor fishermen, was, for many years before his lamentable death, regularly elected as King. We may say the royal position was elective and not hereditary."

He is remembered by a stained glass window in St Marys Church, Claddagh, Galway.

He was succeeded as King of the Claddagh by Padge King, within whose family the title rested for many years, and without annual elections.

Preceded by unknown	King of the Claddagh ?–1887	Succeeded by Padge King
