= Giuseppe Mojoli =

Italian catholic priest and diplomat

Giuseppe Mojoli (31 August 1905 – 9 March 1980) was an Italian prelate of the Catholic Church who worked in the diplomatic service of the Holy See.

== Biography ==
Giuseppe Mojoli was born in Covo in the Province of Bergamo on 31 August 1905. He was ordained a priest on 18 March 1928.

He worked in the Roman Curia in the liturgical department of the Congregation for the Oriental Churches, from 1931 to 1960. His specialty was the Ethiopian Church and he helped develop Ethiopian editions of the Missal and other texts.

On 27 September 1960, Pope John XXIII appointed him Apostolic Internuncio to Ethiopia and a titular archbishop. He received his episcopal consecration on 28 October from Pope John. In Ethiopia he turned from scholarship to supporting Catholic parishes and missions. On 8 March 1969, his title was changed to Apostolic Pro-Nuncio.

On 14 November 1969, Pope Paul VI named him Apostolic Nuncio to Malta and Pope Paul accepted his resignation from that post in December 1971, when Mojoli was 66.

Mojoli died on 9 March 1980.

His writings include:

- La Chiesa in Etiopia. Note e ricordi di un Nunzio (Roma: Esca, 1973)
- Attività liturgical della S. Congregazione 'De Propaganda Fide' per gli affari du Rito Orientale nel periodo 1893–1917 (Vicenza: Esca, 1979).
