= Francesco Canali =

His Eminence Francesco Canali
- Cardinal-Priest of San Clemente
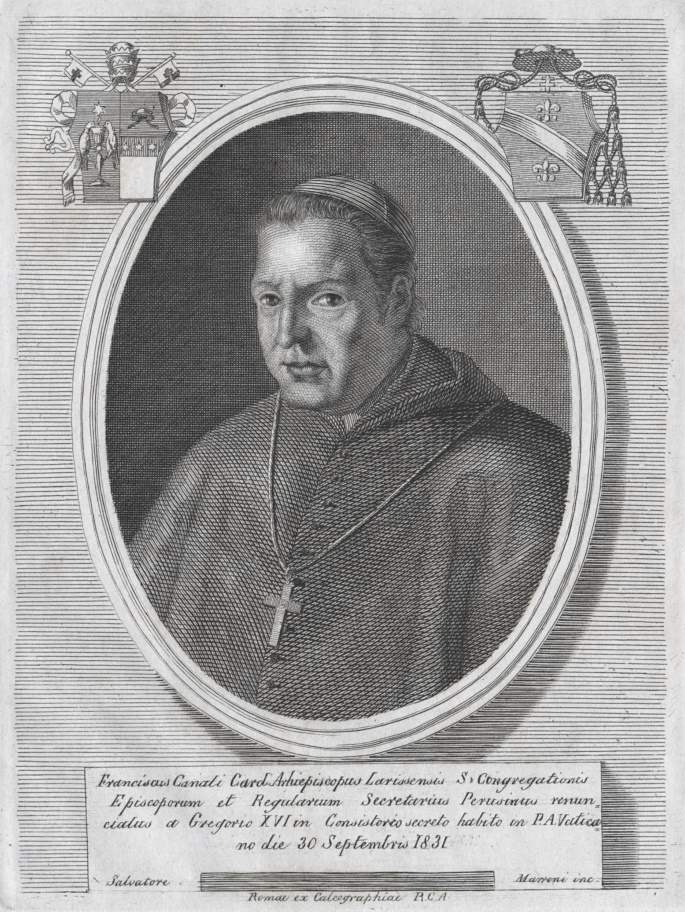
- Church: Roman Catholic Church
- Appointed: 1 August 1834
- Term ended: 11 April 1835
- Predecessor: Benedetto Cappelletti
- Successor: Pietro Ostini
- Previous posts: Bishop of Spoleto (1814-20); Bishop of Tivoli (1820-27); Titular Archbishop of Larissa (1827-34)

Orders
- Ordination: 20 December 1788
- Consecration: 1814
- Created cardinal: 30 September 1831 (in pectore); 23 June 1834 (revealed) by Pope Gregory XVI
- Rank: Cardinal-Priest

Personal details
- Born: Francesco Canali; 20 October 1764 Perugia, Papal States
- Died: 11 April 1835 (aged 70) Rome, Papal States
- Buried: San Clemente
- Parents: Giuseppe Canali; Antonia Dati
- Education: University of Perugia
- Coat of arms

Francesco Canali (1764, Perugia–1835, Ferrara) was an Italian cardinal. He was the Titular Archbishop of Larissa.

== Early life ==
Francesco Canali studied in his native city of Perugia and was ordained in December 1786 as a deacon. Two years later he received the priesthood. In 1793 he was professor of theology at the seminary of Perugia, which he was rector from 1797 to 1806. Moreover, Canali was from 1797 to 1800 prior of the theologian College his hometown, and thereafter the chamberlain. 1809, he was jailed by the French and taken to Parma, Piacenza, Corsica and Bastia. In August 1814 he returned to Perugia.

== Episcopal biography ==
Francesco Canali was appointed Bishop of Spoleto in 1814 and transferred the 23 July 1820 by Pope Pius VII in Tivoli church as administrator, then elected bishop of Tivoli on 28 August 1820. He resigned in 1827 and became titular Archbishop of Larissa in Thessaly. In February 1827 he was appointed secretary of the Congregation of regular and canonical bishops of the Vatican Basilica.

Pope Gregory XVI created him cardinal in pectore on 30 September 1831. Published 23 June 1834.

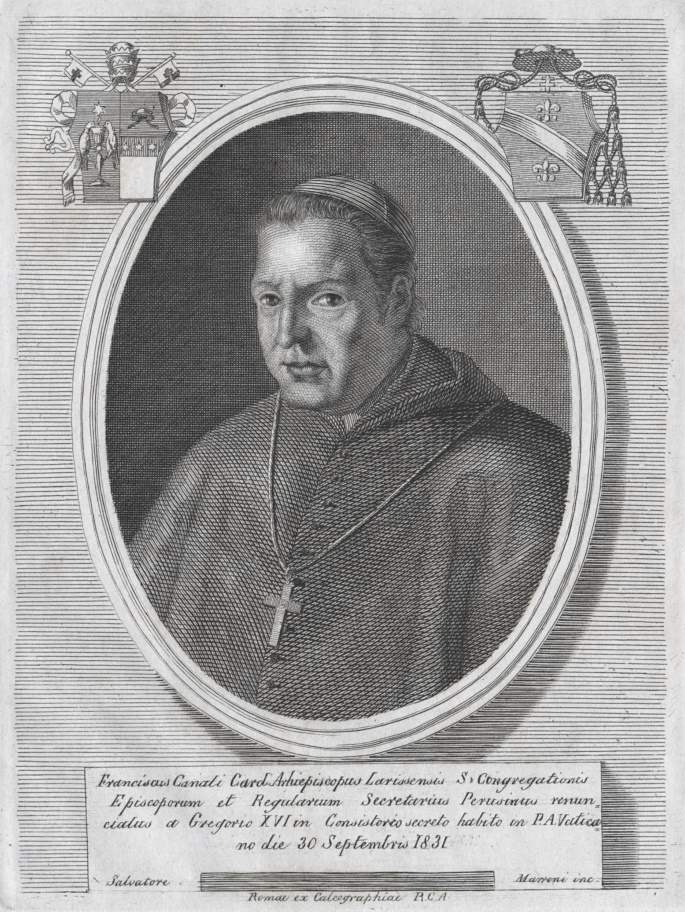
Kardinal Francesco Canali.
