= James Hickey (Fenian) =

Irish Fenian and Land Leaguer

James Hickey (c. 1837 – c. 4 August 1885) was an Irish Fenian and Land Leaguer.

== Early life and war service ==
Hickey was born near Barna about 1837 or 1838, is stated to have received a good education and settled in Boston at an unknown time prior to 1861. When the American Civil War began, he enlisted joined Company A, Irish Ninth, commanded by Captain James A. McGunnigle.

Hickey was promoted to sergeant, and was wounded twice during the course of the war.

== Invasion of Canada ==
A member of the Fenian Brotherhood, Hickey became involved in the organisation's invasion of Canada (Fenian raids) in 1866. He fought at the Battle of Ridgeway but was captured and sentenced to death, being prepared for the scaffold by Archbishop John Joseph Lynch. However, his sentence was commuted to twenty years' imprisonment of which he spent five years and eight months imprisoned near Toronto, before eventually being reprieved.

== Return to Ireland ==
Hickey returned to the family farm in Barna and became involved in the Irish National Land League during the Land War of the late 1870s and early 1890s. He organised the tenants, fought the landlords and succeeded in improving the condition of the local peasant population.

His work made him a marked man in the eyes of the authorities, and he was forced to return to U.S. to gain employment, leaving his wife and four children in Ireland.

== Death in New York ==
He moved from Boston to New York City and obtained a job via the postmaster at the Federal Building, in July. His health was bad, and was already prematurely grey. He died while preparing for Sunday mass at the home of his cousin, Patrick Carrick (foreman of The Irish World newspaper) in Brooklyn.

He was buried in Holy Cross Cemetery, Flatbush, Long Island.
