= John Folan =

British Army soldier of World War I (1895-19??)

- Born: 1895; Cashel, Connemara, County Galway, Ireland
- Died: Unknown
- Military career
- Allegiance: (Republic of Ireland) Ireland & United Kingdom of Great Britain and Ireland
- Branch: British Army
- Service years: 1914–18
- Rank: World War I – Private
- Units: Connaught Rangers c.1914 – 1918
- Conflicts: World War I
- Awards: Distinguished Conduct Medal (3 June 1916); Mentioned in Despatches (5); 1915 Star; Order of the Karađorđe's Star-2nd Class Silver Star (with Swords); British War Medal; Victory Medal

John Folan, born in Cashel, County Galway, (fl.1895–1918) was an Irish recipient of the Distinguished Conduct Medal, the second highest for gallantry in the face of the enemy that can be awarded to British and Commonwealth forces. Folan also received the Order of the Karađorđe's Star for service on the Macedonian front in 1917, during World War I.

== Details ==
John Folan was born in Cannower, Cashel, County Galway in 1895, the son of Bridget and Thomas Folan. Folan was a private in the 3rd Battalion, Connaught Rangers, British Army when the following deed took place for which he was awarded the DCM.

"For conspicuous gallantry when in command of a trench. Although wounded, he held on to his position after part of the line had been rushed."

The Connacht Tribune in June, 1916 reported

Reward for Gallantry. It has caused much satisfaction in Cashel (Connemara), to learn that Private John Folan of the Connacht Rangers, has been awarded the Distinguished Conduct Medal in Mesopotamia. Though seriously wounded, and after his officer has been shot, he rallied his company, and held a line of trenches against the Turks. He is a son of the late Thomas Folan, pilot, Canower, County Galway.

=== Distinguished Conduct Medal ===
The following announcement appeared in June 1916 and since there was usually a gap of about 3 months before a specific event and the announcement of an award it would normally relate to something occurring in early 1916.

LONDON GAZETTE 13 JUNE 1916 DCM ANNOUNCEMENT
'His Majesty the KING has been graciously pleased, on the occasion of His Majesty's Birthday, to approve of the undermentioned rewards for distinguished services in connection with Military Operations with the British Forces in Salonika:—

AWARDED THE DISTINGUISHED CONDUCT MEDAL.
3/5582 Pte. J. Folan, 3rd Bn, Conn. Rang.

SUPPLEMENT TO THE LONDON GAZETTE, 13 JULY 1916
‘With reference to the dispatch published in June 1916, the following are mentioned for distinguished and gallant services rendered during the period of Sir Charles Munro’s command of the Mediterramean Expeditionary Force*.'
3/5582 Pte. J. Folan, 3rd Bn, Conn. Rang.

=== Irish War of Independence and Civil War ===
He returned to Ireland after the War and joined the Cashel Company of the West Connemara brigade of the IRA during the Irish War of Independence. He subsequently joined the Free State Army on the pro-Treaty side during the Irish Civil war and was stationed in Abbeyfeale, County Kerry during the conflict.

== See also ==
- Ó Cualáin
