= Claddagh =

Claddagh An Cladach
- District
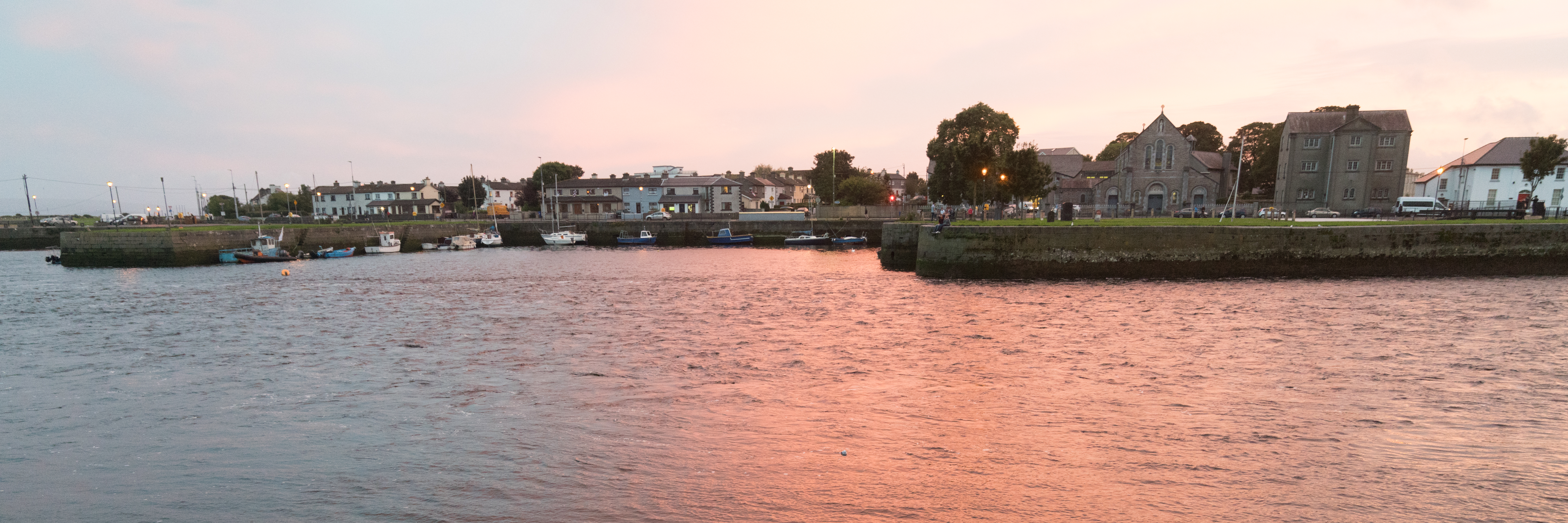

- Location in Ireland
- Coordinates: 53°16′09″N 9°03′23″W
- Country: Ireland
- Province: Connacht
- County: County Galway
- Time zone: UTC+0 (WET)
  - Summer (DST): UTC+1 (IST (WEST))

The Claddagh (Irish: An Cladach, meaning 'the seashore') is an area close to the centre of Galway, Ireland, where the River Corrib meets Galway Bay. It was formerly a fishing village, just outside the old city walls. It is just across the river from the Spanish Arch, which was the location of regular fish markets where the locals supplied the city with seafood as recently as the end of the 19th century.

The original village of thatched cottages was razed in the 1930s and replaced by a council-housing scheme.

The Claddagh ring originated here. It is popular among those of Irish heritage as both a friendship and wedding ring. This traditional design consists of two clasped hands holding a crowned heart, and symbolises love, friendship and loyalty.

The Claddagh area contains a national school, community centre and a Catholic church as well as the new Claddagh Arts Centre.

== Notable people ==
- Bobby Beggs (1911–1993), Dublin-born Gaelic footballer who later played for Galway, lived in Claddagh
- Thomas Grady (1835–1891), recipient of the Victoria Cross in the Crimean War
- President Catherine Connolly settled in the Claddagh in married life.
- Sean Cannon (1940-), Irish singer and member of The Dubliners, born in Claddagh.

== See also ==
- King of the Claddagh
- Claddagh Palace
- List of public art in Galway city
- Nicholas Blake (Dominican)
