= Fiant =

A fiant was a writ issued to the Irish Chancery mandating the issue of letters patent under the Great Seal of Ireland. The name fiant comes from the opening words of the document, Fiant litterae patentes, Latin for "Let letters patent be made". Fiants were typically issued by the chief governor of Ireland, under his privy seal; or sealed by the Secretary of State, who served as "Keeper of the Privy Seal of Ireland", just as the English Secretary of State did in England. Fiants dealt with matters ranging from appointments to high office and important government activities, to grants of pardons to the humblest of the native Irish. Fiants relating to early modern Ireland are an important primary source for the period for historians and genealogists. The Tudor fiants were especially numerous, many relating to surrender and regrant. A fiant often provides more information than the ensuing letters patent recorded on patent rolls. There are also fiants for which the patent roll does not list any letters patent, either because none were issued or because those issued were never enrolled, through accident or abuse. Prior to the Act of Explanation 1665, letters patent were enrolled (if at all) after they were granted; under the act, the fiant was enrolled first, and the letters issued afterwards. Thereafter the rolls, which were catalogued in the 19th century, give the same information as the original fiants.

The Public Record Office of Ireland (PROI) held Chancery fiants from 1521 (Henry VIII) up to 1891 (Victoria), as well as Crown and Hanaper fiants (1619–1873), Privy Council of Ireland fiant books (1711–1832), and Signet Office (Chief Secretary for Ireland) fiant books (1796–1830). The originals were destroyed in the 1922 explosion in the Four Courts. The fiants of the Tudor sovereigns had been calendared and published from 1875–90. An 1820s manuscript calendar of the fiants of James I and Charles I is available in the PROI (now the National Archives of Ireland).

Reports of the Deputy Keeper of Public Records in Ireland
Year	Report No.	Appendix No.	Command paper	Reign	Dates	Fiant Nos.
1875	7th	App X	C. 1175	Henry VIII	1521–47	1–548
1886	18th	App VI p.147	C. 4755	Henry VIII	1521–47	64a..548 [6793–6797]
1876	8th	App IX	C. 1469	Edward VI	1547–53	1–1257
1886	18th	App VI p.148	C. 4755	Edward VI	1547–53	159a..1147a [6798–6807]
1877	9th	App IV	C. 1702	Philip and Mary	1553–58	1–276
1886	18th	App VI p.150	C. 4755	Philip and Mary	1553–58	277–279 [6808–6811]
1878	11th	App 3	C. 2311	Elizabeth	1558–70	1–1614
1880	12th	App V	C. 2583	Elizabeth	1570–76	1615–2935
1881	13th	App IV	C. 2929	Elizabeth	1576–83	2936–4253
1883	15th	App I	C. 3676	Elizabeth	1583–86	4254–4935
1884	16th	App II	C. 4062	Elizabeth	1586–95	4936–5973
1885	17th	App IV	C. 4487	Elizabeth	1596–1601	5974–6564
1886	18th	App VI	C. 4755	Elizabeth	1601–03	6565–6792
1889	21st	App III	C. 5835	Elizabeth	1558–1603	Index A-C
1890	22nd	App VI	C. 6180.i	Elizabeth	1558–1603	Index D-Z
