= Cormac Folan =

Irish rower

Personal information
- Nationality: Irish
- Born: 9 July 1983 (age 42) Barna, Connemara, Ireland
- Education: NUI Galway

Sport
- Sport: Rowing

Cormac Folan (born 9 July 1983) is an Irish rower. He competed in the men's coxless four event at the 2008 Summer Olympics. From Barna in Connemara, County Galway, Folan rowed for NUI Galway Boat Club.
