= Barna =

Village in County Galway, Ireland

- Village
- Bearna
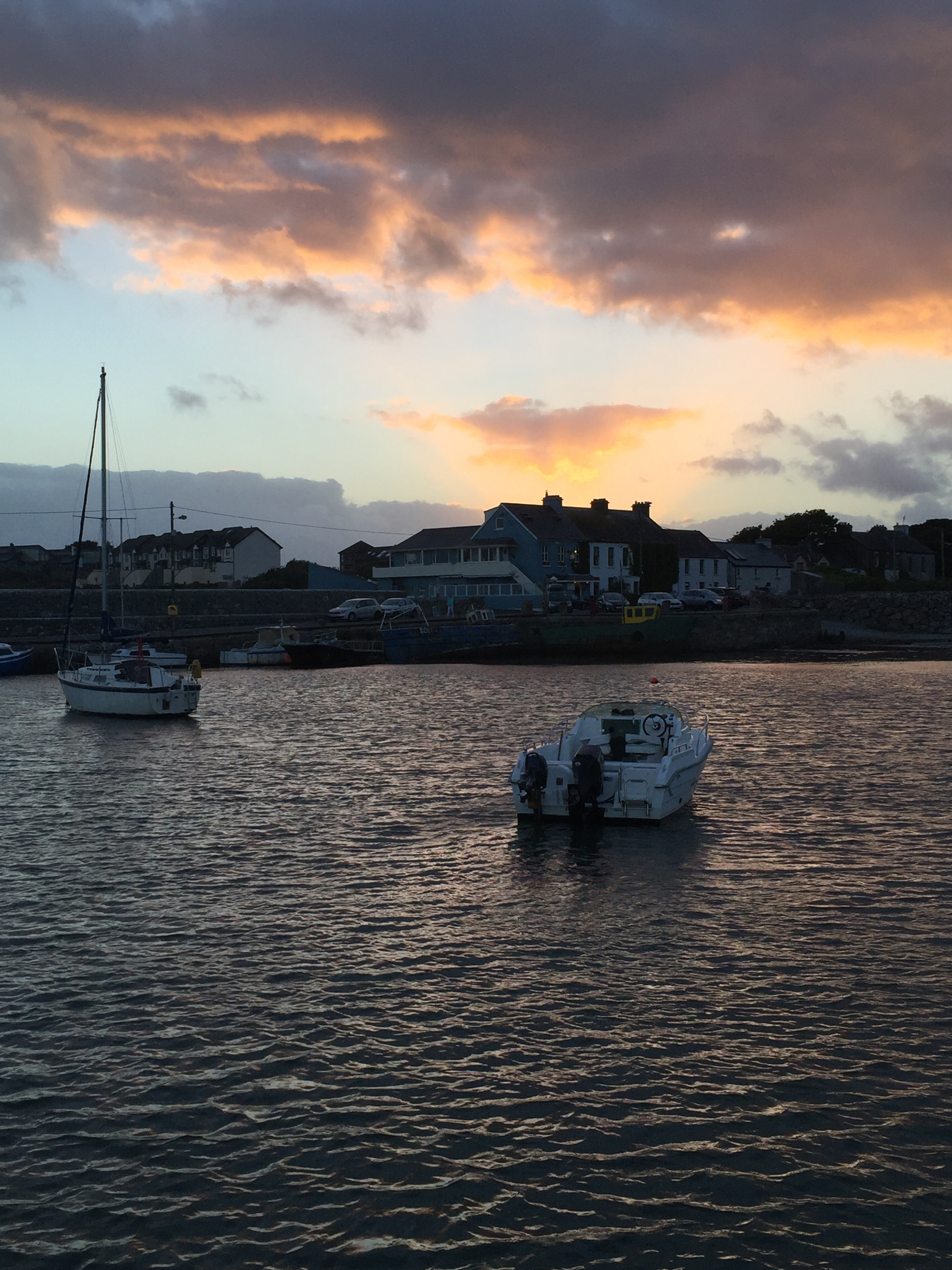
- Barna quay at dusk

- Location in Ireland
- Coordinates: 53°15′N 9°09′W
- Country: Ireland
- Province: Connacht
- County: County Galway

Population (2022)
  - Total: 2,336
- Irish grid reference: M232227
- Bearna is the official name in Irish while Barna is the anglicised spelling.

Barna, officially known as Bearna in both Irish and English, is a coastal village on the R336 regional road in Connemara, County Galway, Ireland. Located approximately 7 km west of the centre of Galway city, it has become a satellite village of Galway. The village, which is mostly Irish speaking, is a constituent part of the regions of Ireland that make up the Gaeltacht.

== History ==
Evidence of ancient settlement in the area includes a number of shell midden, ringfort, holy well and castle sites in the townlands of Barna, Knockaunnacarragh, Derryloney and Truskey. Barna House, a large Georgian house in Barna townland, was built in 1778. The quay at Barna was built in the 1820s to designs by Alexander Nimmo.

== Demographics ==
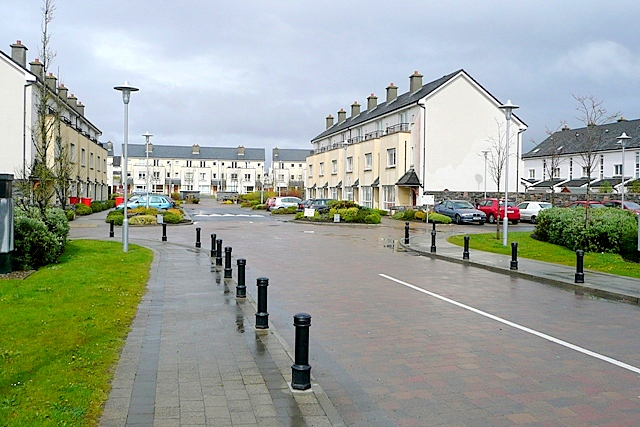
Modern construction in Barna

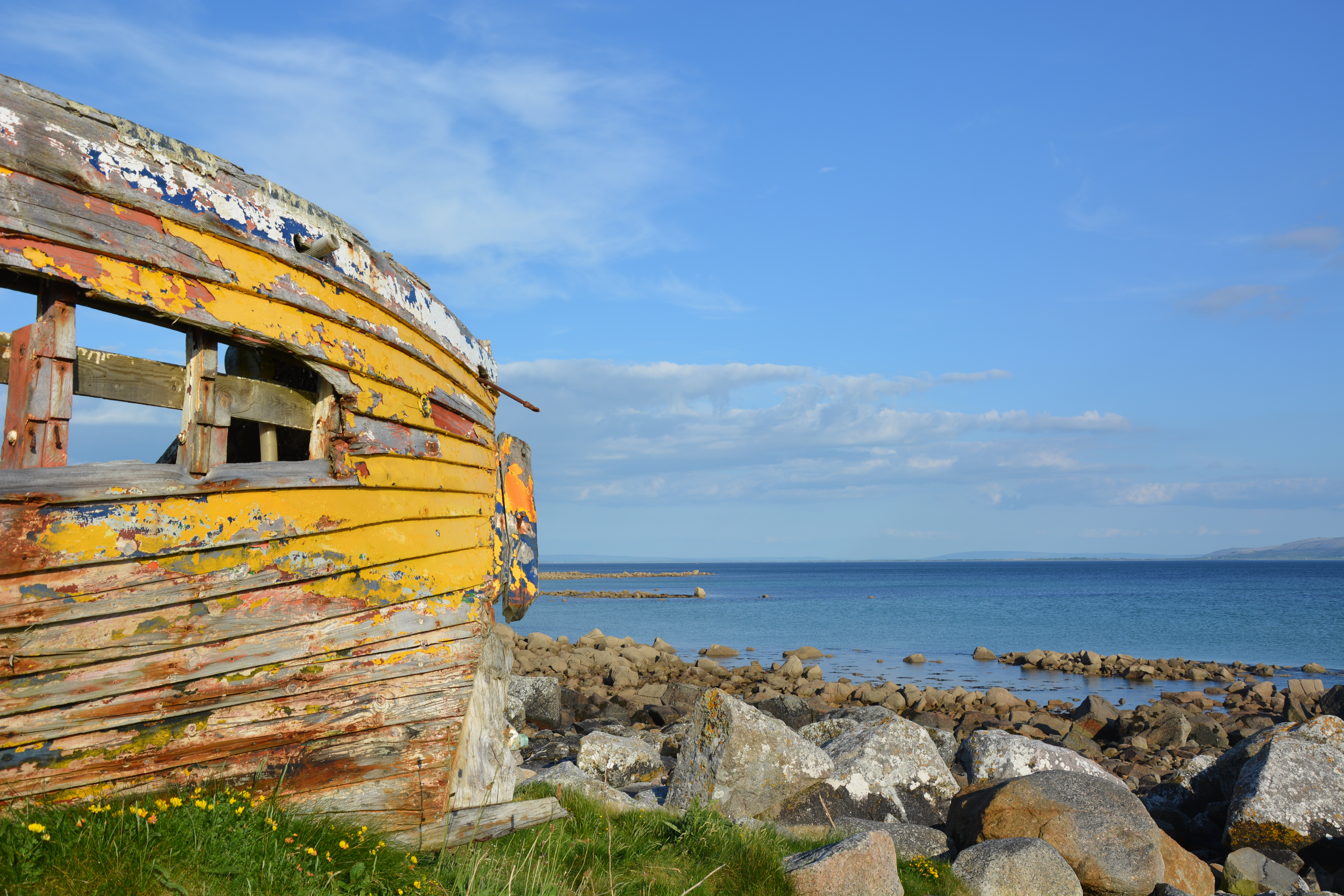
Galway Bay seen from Barna

At the time of the 2011 census, the population in the village was 1,878, of which males numbered 920 and females were 958. The total housing stock was 772, of which vacant households numbered 98. With an approximate area of 1.89 km^{2}, the village area had a 2011 population density of 994 persons per km^{2}. By the 2022 census, the village had a population of 2,336.

=== Irish language ===
In 2011, the Barna Electoral Division (ED) had a population of 3,630, of which males numbered 1,804 and females were 1,826. At that time there were 2,298 Irish speakers in the electoral division. According to the 2006 census, approximately 25% of inhabitants spoke Irish daily. By the 2011 census, 24% of Bearna's locals used Irish as a daily language.

== Community and sport ==
In 1976, a community development group called Comharchumann Bearna Teoranta was formed after funds were collected to purchase a 2-acre (8,100 m^{2}) plot at Troscaigh Thiar to be used for community purposes. Several sports facilities, including a tennis court and pitch and putt course, were subsequently developed on the site.

Sports clubs in the area include Barna GAC, which fields Gaelic football teams in men's and ladies' competitions. The local hurling club is Bearna/Na Forbacha GAA club. Other sports clubs in the locality include Barna United association football club and Galway Bay Rugby Club. Cormac Folan of Freeport in Barna represented Ireland in rowing at the 2008 Summer Olympics. Barna Golf Club, two miles north of the village, is a moorland 18-hole golf course.

== Townlands ==
Townlands in the area, the names of many of which are anglicisations of their original Irish names, include:

- Forramoyle West (from Na Foraí Maola Thiar)
- Forramoyle East (from Na Foraí Maola Thoir)
- New Village (from An Baile Nua)
- Leaclea (from An Leac Liath meaning ‘the grey flagstone or slab’)
- Seapoint (Rinn na Mara in Irish)
- Ahaglugger (from Ath an Ghlugair)
- Truskey West (from Troscaigh Thiar)
- Truskey East (from Troscaigh Thoir)
- Freeport (An Chéibh in Irish)
- Ballard West (from An Baile Ard Thiar meaning ‘the high village west’)
- Ballard East (from An Baile Ard Thoir meaning ‘the high village east’)
- Lenarevagh (from An Léana Riabhach meaning ‘the brindled or streaked grassland’)
- Knockaunnacarragh (from An Cnocán Carrach)

== International links ==
Barna is twinned with Esquibien, Brittany, France.

== Notable people ==
- Cormac Folan (born 1983), rower who represented Ireland at the 2008 Summer Olympics in the men's coxless four event.
- James Hickey (c.1837–1885), Fenian and Land Leaguer
- Micheál Ó Droigheaín (1889–1964), Irish Republican Army brigadier
- Sarah McInerney (born 1981), journalist and broadcaster
