= King of the Claddagh =

Leader of Claddagh community in Galway City, Ireland

The King of the Claddagh was the leader of the Claddagh community in Galway city as well as at sea who was charged with being the arbiter in any disputes. A new king was chosen on St. John's Day, 23 June. It is now an honorary role.

== Mayors and kings ==
Elections of Mayors of the Claddagh are noted in 1812 and 1837. One possible mayor in the 1830s was Denis King. Only in 1846 are the names of the mayor, Bartley Hynes, and the runner-up and deputy, Owen Jones, recorded. Hynes died on 27 April 1849 and was succeeded by Jones.

The first recorded King of the Claddagh was the Rev Thomas Folan, who died in 1887. Padge King and Eoin Concannon were his successors, and regarded as the last actual kings when Concannon died in 1954. Ceremonial 'kings' since then have been Martin Oliver, Patrick Ladeen Curran, and Mike Lynskey.

Martin Oliver, for example, held the title from the early 1960s until 1972, and represented the community at events such as the Oyster Festival. Oliver was a descendant of 19th century mariner Martin Oliver and owned the Galway hooker Truelight.

== See also ==
- Mayor of Galway
