= Catholic Church in Jamaica =

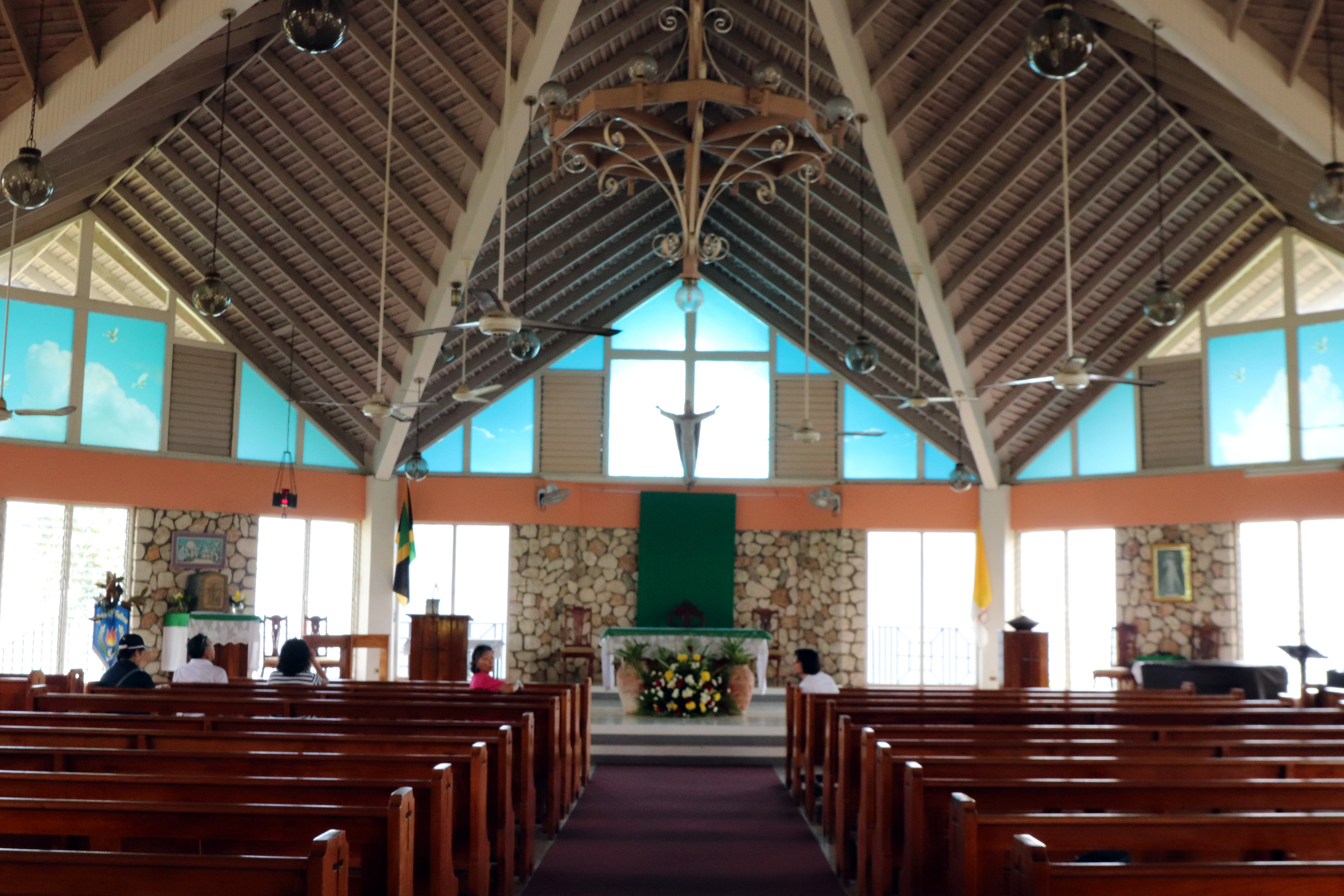
- Our Lady of Fatima church at Ocho Rios
- Type: National polity
- Classification: Catholic
- Orientation: Latin
- Scripture: Bible
- Theology: Catholic theology
- Governance: AEC
- Pope: Leo XIV
- Apostolic Nuncio: Santiago de Wit Guzmán
- Archbishop: Kenneth Richards
- Region: Jamaica
- Language: English; Latin
- Headquarters: Kingston
- Origin: Early 16th century
- Members: 57,946 (2011 census)

The Catholic Church in Jamaica is part of the worldwide Catholic Church, under the spiritual leadership of the Pope in Rome, and further organized under the Antilles Episcopal Conference.

There are about 50,000 (2%) Catholics in Jamaica, which is divided into three dioceses, including one archdiocese:

- Archdiocese of Kingston
  - Diocese of Mandeville
  - Diocese of Montego Bay

Additionally, the Ecclesiastical province of Kingston in Jamaica also includes the Diocese of Belize City–Belmopan and a Mission sui iuris in the Cayman Islands.

Christianity and Roman Catholicism were first brought to Jamaica by Spanish missionaries and settlers in the early 16th century. Since then, the Catholic Church has had a continuous presence in the island from the 19th century onwards. While small in number, Catholics have occupied noteworthy positions in Jamaican society, and have founded many educational institutions in the country.

The Missionaries of the Poor monastic order originated in Kingston, Jamaica.

== History ==
=== Origins & Spanish period ===
Catholic presence in Jamaica started in the early 16th century under the wing of Spain's rule over the island.

Upon Spanish arrival, the local Taíno were put under the encomienda forced labour system, with one of its objectives being the evangelization of the native population. It is unknown whether clerics arrived along the first Spanish settlers in 1509. King Ferdinand II himself expressed his desire to give priority to Catholic education in the process of conquest, and to avoid the shortcomings of the system in Hispaniola from being repeated in Jamaica. Thus, he ordered the first Franciscan friars be sent to the island in 1512. Nevertheless, the extinction of the natives was already evident by 1570.

Because of Jamaica's smaller population and resources, and its lesser economic and strategic importance relative to Santo Domingo and Cuba, a more rudimentary administrative-religious organization was adopted, and so an Abbey was established for the spiritual governance of the island starting in 1514-1515. It was formally subordinate to the Archdiocese of Seville until 1547, but kept its de facto dependency till 1574, when it was ultimately ascribed to the diocese of Santiago de Cuba. Before this, the dioceses of Santo Domingo and Santiago de Cuba squabbled for control over the abbey, deriving in a spiritual abandonment of the island.

During Spanish rule, Roman Catholicism was the official and solely permitted faith.

The Spanish erected churches, and the Franciscan and Dominican orders set up small monasteries. Between 1600 and 1625 a cofradía was established at the Franciscan's church in Santiago de la Vega. The islanders were especially devoted to Saint James, hence the Spanish name for the colony, Santiago.

=== Under British rule ===
The English conquest of Jamaica in 1655 resulted in Roman Catholicism being officially proscribed and its adherents forced underground, with the Church of England replacing it as the official church of the colony. The English destroyed Catholic churches and monasteries, and demanded all of the clergy to leave the island.

These restrictions were only gradually removed more than a century later by the Papists Act 1778 and the Roman Catholic Relief Act 1791, culminating in the passing of the Roman Catholic Relief Act 1829. In 1792, Anthony Quigley, an Irish Franciscan, was sent to Jamaica to minister the scattered faithful of Spanish, French and Irish descent. In 1837, Jesuits were allowed to come into the island. By 1870, Roman Catholics had again become a significant presence in Jamaica and were granted freedom to worship in public, which allowed them to evangelize, especially in the parishes of Kingston and Saint Andrew. The Roman Catholic mission was under the control of the English Province of the Society of Jesus (Jesuits); Jamaica at the time did not have a Catholic bishop but was under the jurisdiction of the vicar apostolic of the Antilles, residing in Trinidad. Because large numbers of Catholics in Jamaica were French and Spanish speaking (mainly in Kingston), Jesuits were sometimes "borrowed" from French and Spanish provinces to work in the island. As new missionaries and members of religious orders came to Jamaica, churches were built and schools were set up, one of the best known and most influential being St. George's College.

In contrast to the various Protestant denominations present in Jamaica, which had a strong presence among the black peasantry, Catholic adherents mainly consisted of relatively well-off Europeans and white or brown creoles in Kingston and Spanish Town, generally of French or Spanish background. Similar to their Protestant counterparts, however, was the Catholic laity's independent and demanding nature; relations between the Jesuits -which made up almost the entirety of the clergy- and the laity were often stormy and bitter. Relations among the Jesuits themselves were also convoluted, reflecting arguments about the most effective way of evangelizing.

In 1911, the Holy Trinity Cathedral was opened in Kingston. The number of Catholic followers in 1921 was estimated at 37,000 (around 4% of the population at the time).

In 1950, American prelate John J. McEleney was appointed Vicar Apostolic of Jamaica, later becoming Bishop of Kingston when the apostolic vicariate was elevated to the Diocese of Kingston in 1956. McEleney opened St. Michael's Seminary in 1952 to train native seminarians.

=== Independent Jamaica ===
Dioceses of the Catholic Church in Jamaica

In 1967, the Diocese of Montego Bay was erected on territory split from the Diocese of Kingston, which at the time encompassed the entire island. Simultaneously, the Diocese of Kingston was elevated to an Archdiocese, with John McEleney serving as its first Archbishop.

On his way to attend World Youth Day 1993, Pope John Paul II visited Jamaica from 9 to 11 August. He was received by dignitaries including Governor General Sir Howard Cooke and Prime Minister P. J. Patterson. In his arrival speech, the pontiff emphasized a need for integration and regional unity within the Caribbean.

In 1991, parts were split off from the Archdiocese of Kingston and the Diocese of Montego Bay in order to erect the Apostolic Vicariate of Mandeville. In 1997, its status was elevetad to that of a Diocese.

== Some notable Jamaican Catholics ==
- Alexander Bustamante – first Prime Minister of Jamaica
- Usain Bolt – sprinter and eight-time Olympic gold medallist
- Ivy Baxter – dancer and scholar
- John Groves – cricket player

== See also ==
- Antilles Episcopal Conference
- List of Roman Catholic dioceses in the Caribbean
- Religion in Jamaica
