= Burchell McPherson =

Jamaican Roman Catholic prelate (1951–2026)

The Most Reverend Burchell Alexander McPherson
- Bishop Emeritus of Montego Bay
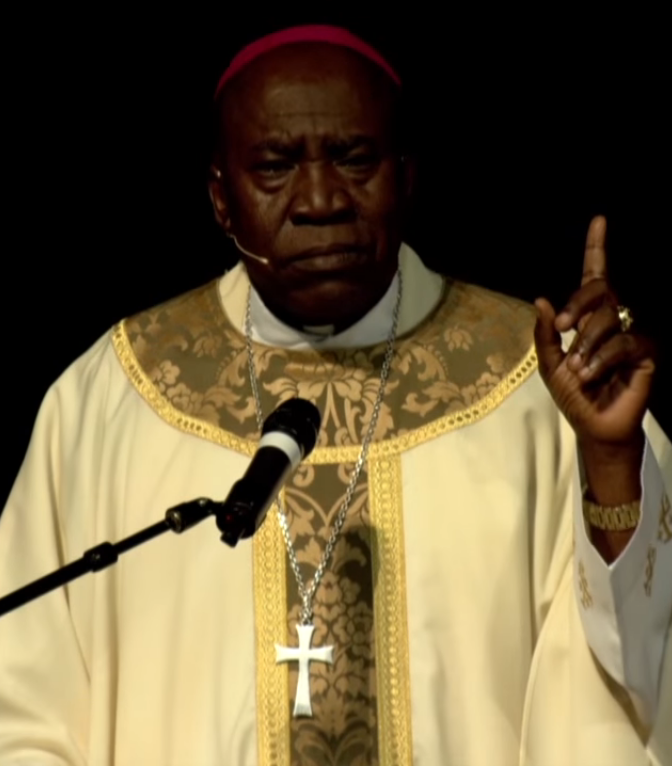
- McPherson in 2015
- Archdiocese: Kingston in Jamaica
- Diocese: Montego Bay
- Installed: 8 June 2013
- Term ended: 16 October 2023
- Predecessor: Charles Dufour
- Successor: John Derek Persaud (Apostolic Administrator)

Orders
- Ordination: 23 June 1991
- Consecration: 8 June 2013 by Donald James Reece, Neil Edward Tiedemann and Charles Dufour

Personal details
- Born: Burchell Alexander McPherson; 7 May 1951 Mavis Bank, Surrey, Colony of Jamaica
- Died: 25 March 2026 (aged 74) Kingston, Jamaica
- Denomination: Roman Catholic
- Motto: Service before self
- Coat of arms

Styles of Burchell Alexander McPherson
- Reference style: His Excellency; The Most Reverend
- Spoken style: Your Excellency
- Religious style: Bishop

Burchell Alexander McPherson (7 May 1951 – 25 March 2026) was a Jamaican Roman Catholic prelate, who served as the third Bishop of the Diocese of Montego Bay from 2013 to 2023.

== Early life and education ==
McPherson was born in Mavis Bank, Jamaica on 7 May 1951. He was educated at St. Michael’s Seminary and the University of the West Indies before beginning his theological studies for the priesthood.

== Priesthood ==
McPherson was ordained a priest for the Archdiocese of Kingston on 23 June 1991. During his ministry, he served as the pastor of St. Pius X and St. Peter Claver parishes, and later as the pastor of St. Joseph’s Church in Falmouth. He was known for his extensive community work and spiritual leadership within the local parishes.

== Episcopal ministry ==
On 11 April 2013, Pope Francis appointed McPherson as the Bishop of the Diocese of Montego Bay. He was consecrated on 8 June 2013, with Archbishop Donald James Reece serving as the principal consecrator.

His tenure as bishop focused on pastoral outreach and the strengthening of diocesan infrastructure. On 16 October 2023, the Holy See announced that Pope Francis had accepted his resignation from the governance of the diocese.

== Death ==
McPherson died in Kingston on 25 March 2026, at the age of 74, following a period of illness.

Catholic Church titles
Preceded by Charles Dufour	Bishop of Montego Bay; 2013–2023	Succeeded by Vacant
