= John Derek Persaud =

Guyanese-born Roman Catholic bishop (born 1956)

The Most Reverend John Derek Persaud
- Bishop of Mandeville
- Province: Kingston in Jamaica
- Diocese: Mandeville
- Appointed: 19 June 2020
- Installed: 19 September 2020
- Predecessor: Neil Edward Tiedemann
- Other post: Apostolic Administrator of Montego Bay (since 2023)

Orders
- Ordination: 14 July 1985 by Benedict Singh
- Consecration: 19 September 2020 by Kenneth Richards

Personal details
- Born: John Derek Persaud; 28 August 1956 (age 70) Georgetown, British Guiana
- Denomination: Roman Catholic
- Education: Pontifical Urban University
- Coat of arms

John Derek Persaud (born 28 August 1956) is a Guyanese-born Jamaican Roman Catholic prelate, who has served as the Bishop of the Diocese of Mandeville in Jamaica since 2020.

== Early life and education ==
John Derek Persaud was born on 28 August 1956 in Georgetown, Guyana. He entered the seminary to study for the priesthood and completed his philosophical and theological studies at the Seminary of Saint John Vianney and the Uganda Martyrs in Tunapuna, Trinidad and Tobago. He later earned a licentiate in canon law from the Pontifical Urban University in Rome.

== Priesthood ==
He was ordained a priest for the Diocese of Georgetown on 14 July 1985. During his ministry in Guyana, Persaud held several key positions, including serving as the pastor of the Cathedral of the Immaculate Conception in Georgetown and Chancellor of the Diocese. From 2014 to 2018, he served as the General Secretary of the Antilles Episcopal Conference (AEC).

== Episcopal ministry ==
On 19 June 2020, Pope Francis appointed Persaud as the Bishop of the Diocese of Mandeville. He succeeded Bishop Neil Edward Tiedemann, filling a vacancy that had existed since 2016.

Persaud was consecrated on 19 September 2020 at the St. Paul of the Cross Cathedral in Mandeville. The principal consecrator was Archbishop of Kingston in Jamaica Kenneth Richards, with Archbishops Charles Dufour and Bishop Burchell McPherson serving as co-consecrators.

Since 16 October 2023 he is also serving as an Apostolic Administrator of the Diocese of Montego Bay.
