= Religion in Jamaica =

Religion in Jamaica (Pew Research Center 2020)
1. Christianity (68.6%)
2. Unaffiliated (23.7%)
3. Other religions (7.60%)
Religion in Jamaica (CIA World Factbook 2011)
1. Protestantism (64.8%)
2. Catholicism (2.20%)
3. Jehovah's Witnesses (1.90%)
4. Rastafari (1.10%)
5. None (21.3%)
6. Other religions (6.50%)
7. Unspecified (2.20%)

Christianity is the predominant religion in Jamaica. Jamaica's laws establish freedom of religion and prohibit religious discrimination. According to the census of 2011, 69% of the population were Christians of various denominations, while 21% stated they had no religion.

== Christianity ==
=== Protestantism ===
According to the 2011 census, 64% of the Jamaican population are Protestants, with several denominations: 26% Church of God, 12% Seventh-day Adventist, 11% Pentecostal, 7% Baptist, 3% Anglican, 2% United Church, 2% Methodist and 1% either Moravian or Brethren Christian.

The Church of God has 111 congregations in six regions:

- Western: 10 congregations in the parishes of St. James, St. Elizabeth, Westmoreland and Trelawny
- South Central: 27 congregations in the parishes of Manchester and St. Elizabeth
- North Central: 17 congregations in the parishes of St. Ann, Manchester and Clarendon
- Central: 21 congregations in the parishes of St. Catherine, Manchester and Clarendon
- South Eastern: 19 congregations in the parishes of St. Andrew, Kingston and St. Catherine
- North Eastern: 17 congregations in the parishes of Portland, St. Mary and St. Ann

=== Roman Catholicism ===
Christianity first reached Jamaica via Roman Catholic missionaries who arrived shortly after the Spanish took possession of the island and established the Colony of Santiago in the early 16th century. During Spanish rule, Roman Catholicism was the official and dominant form of Christianity in Jamaica until the English invasion in 1655, after which Catholicism was proscribed and its adherents forced underground. Restrictions were gradually lifted from the late 18th century onwards. Since then, Catholics have become a small but significant minority within Jamaican society.

There are about 50,000 (2%) Catholics in Jamaica, which is divided into three dioceses, including one archdiocese:

- Roman Catholic Archdiocese of Kingston in Jamaica
- Roman Catholic Diocese of Mandeville
- Roman Catholic Diocese of Montego Bay

The Missionaries of the Poor monastic order originated in Kingston, Jamaica. Also notable is the school, St. George's College, Jamaica.

=== Latter-day Saints ===
The Church of Jesus Christ of Latter-day Saints reports 5,891 members living in Jamaica. Members of the Church are organized under the Kingston Jamaica Stake, the Mandeville Jamaica District and the Kingston Jamaica Mission, and members attend the Panama City Panama Temple.

=== Eastern Orthodoxy ===
Though the Eastern Orthodox Church has a limited history in Jamaica, Eastern Orthodox Christians have long existed in Jamaica. Over a hundred years ago (long before an Oriental Ethiopian Orthodox Tewahedo Church was established on the island in 1972), there was already in existence a Syrian Orthodox community of immigrants.

The earliest recorded instance of Orthodox clergy on the island was in 1910 when a notable number of Syrian immigrants to the island were visited by an Antiochian priest, Father Antonio Michael, who later entrusted them to the local Anglican parishes.

These Syrian Orthodox later interacted with Fr. Raphael Morgan, a figure who has recently garnered interest among Orthodox historians. According to Jamaica Church of England Parish Register Transcripts, Morgan was born between 1863-1866 and originally baptized and christened into the Church of England. He would later convert to Orthodoxy and serve as a priest, though details are still emerging as to the specifics of his life.

Fr. Raphael Morgan, while living in the United States, visited Jamaica in 1913 and stayed there for several months, into 1914 (Jamaica Gleaner, July 22, 1913). He toured the island, giving lectures on his travels around the world, including the Holy Land. Also, the most interesting event that took place was when a Russian warship stopped in Jamaica, and Fr. Raphael served the Divine Liturgy with the Russian priest aboard the ship (Jamaica Gleaner, December 27, 1913). A number of Syrian-Jamaicans attended, and Fr. Raphael used English for their benefit. The next day, the local newspaper reported that Fr. Raphael stated that he was in communication with the Syrian Orthodox Bishop of Brooklyn with regard to the Syrians here and hoped that something would be done in regard to their spiritual welfare. The Syrian Orthodox Bishop of Brooklyn at the time was St. Raphael Hawaweeny. Unfortunately, Fr. Raphael became ill in 1914 and died in February 1915, with the possibility that he was never able to do anything for the Syrians in Jamaica, in addition to the untimely death of St. Raphael of Brooklyn who died about the same time period.

Other recorded instances of Orthodox clergy on the island included St. Cyprian's Anglican Church located in Highgate, St. Mary, which was visited by Archimandrite Gerasimos El Azar, a visiting Syrian priest, who served the Divine Liturgy there in March 1933. The Orthodox Divine Liturgy was also served at the Kingston Parish Church (St. Thomas the Apostle Anglican Church in Kingston) at least on a few occasions in the 1920s and 1930s. According to the Jamaica Gleaner (cited February 23, 1924), the Very Rev. Archpriest Fr. Basil Moses Kerbawy (an early Lebanese American Historian and Advocate, and Dean of St. Nicholas Syrian Orthodox Cathedral in Brooklyn) served Orthodox Paschal services. On at least two other occasions, in 1928 and again in 1933, Orthodox Paschal services were also held at the Kingston Parish Church by visiting Orthodox clergy; the Rev. Fr. Agoplos Golam, Archimandrite of the Greek Orthodox Church, who was a visiting Greek priest to Jamaica (Jamaica Gleaner, April 10, 1928), and the Rt. Rev. Archimandrite Garassinous El Azar, visiting Syrian priest to Jamaica (The Daily Gleaner, February 28, 1933).

Today, there is a small but steadily growing number of Orthodox believers in Jamaica. One example is a native Jamaican man who asked the Greek Orthodox Archdiocese of America to establish a mission in the country for inquirers like him and others. The mission was established on 24 April 2015 as the Holy Orthodox Archdiocese in Jamaica, a Vicariate of the Greek Orthodox Metropolis of Mexico of the Patriarchate of Constantinople. On 15 December 2019, the mission announced that it had officially decided to leave its original jurisdiction in favor of the Russian Orthodox Church Outside Russia. Metropolitan Hilarion has put Vladyka Luke of Syracuse in charge of receiving the mission.

The Jamaican Orthodox Mission currently has two communities: St. Timothy the Apostle Orthodox Church (Kingston) and St. Moses the Black Orthodox Church (Trelawny).

== Rastafari ==
The Rastafari movement or Rasta is a new religious movement that arose in the 1930s in Jamaica, which at the time was a country with a predominantly Christian culture where 98% of the people were the black descendants of slaves. Its adherents worship Haile Selassie I, Emperor of Ethiopia (ruled 1930–1974), as God incarnate, the Second Advent of Jesus Christ or as Christ in his Kingly Character, depending on their views on the Emperor. The 2011 census found that 1% of the population were Rastafari.

== Other religions ==
Other popular religions in Jamaica include Islam, Bahá'í Faith with perhaps 8000 Bahá'ís and 21 Local Spiritual Assemblies, Buddhism, Sikhism and Hinduism. There is also a small population of around 200 Jews forming the Shaare Shalom Synagogue in Kingston, who describe themselves as Liberal-Conservative. The first Jews in Jamaica trace their roots back to early 15th-century Spain and Portugal. There are an estimated 1,500-6,500 Muslims in Jamaica and approximately 21% of the population has no religious affiliation.

Along with Rastafari, Afro-American religions birthed in Jamaica include Revivalism and Kumina.

== Religious freedom ==
The constitution of Jamaica establishes the freedom of religion and outlaws religious discrimination. A colonial-era law criminalizing Obeah and Myalism continues to exist, but has rarely been enforced since Jamaica's independence from the United Kingdom in 1962.

Registration with the government is not mandatory for religious groups, but it provides groups with some privileges, such as being able to own land and enter legal disputes as an organization. Groups seeking tax-exempt status must register separately as charities.

The public school curriculum includes nondenominational religious education. Some public schools are run by religious institutions but are required to hold to the same standard as other public schools. Religious private schools also operate in Jamaica.

Representatives of the Christian, Jewish, and Muslim communities in Jamaica have described Jamaica as being tolerant of religious diversity and identified the high level of interfaith dialogue as evidence to support this claim.

While Rastafari were once persecuted by the government of Jamaica and routinely harassed by police looking for then-illegal cannabis, the government has since taken steps to accommodate Rastafari, including the decriminalization of the possession of small amounts of cannabis for religious purposes in 2015 and formal apologies coupled with financial reparations for past actions against the Rastafari community, such as the Coral Gardens incident. Rastafari still face some societal discrimination, particularly when seeking employment, but community representatives have stated that incidences of discrimination have sharply decreased since 2015.
