= Antilles Episcopal Conference =

Assembly of Catholic bishops in the Caribbean

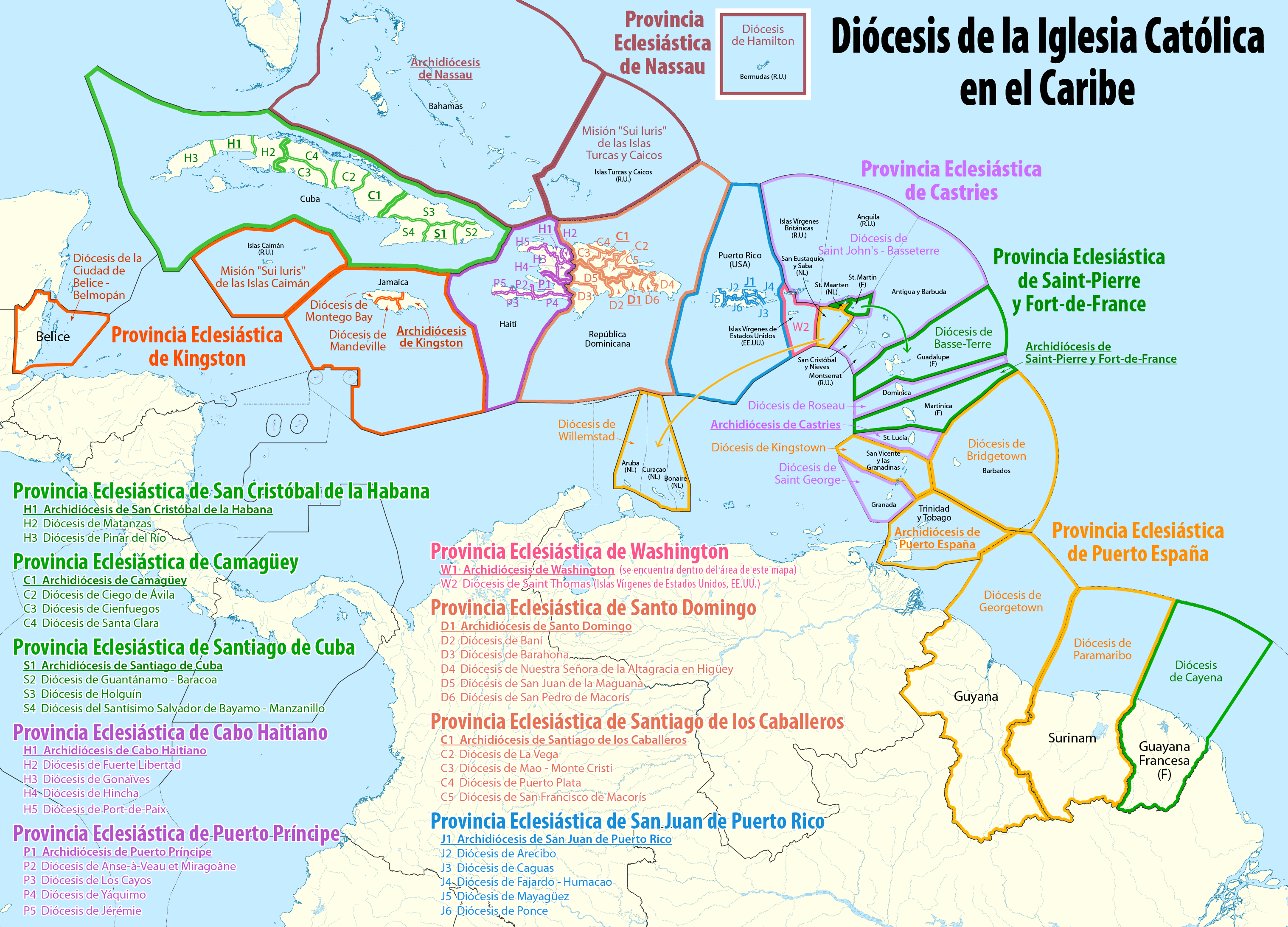
- Catholic Ecclesiastical Provinces and Dioceses in the Caribbean, including members and non-members of the AEC (in Spanish)
- Abbreviation: AEC
- Formation: 1957
- Type: Episcopal conference
- Purpose: To support the ministry of bishops
- Headquarters: Port of Spain, Trinidad and Tobago
- Region served: Former British, Dutch, and French colonies and dependencies in the Caribbean
- Members: Active and retired Catholic bishops of the Caribbean
- President: Charles Jason Gordon
- Website: aecbishops.org

The Antilles Episcopal Conference (AEC) is a Catholic episcopal conference. Its members are bishops and archbishops from current and former British, Dutch, and French colonies and dependencies in the Caribbean (excluding Haiti), Central America, and northern South America. The conference's membership includes five archdioceses, fourteen dioceses, and two missions sui iuris. These particular Churches minister to Catholics in thirteen independent nations, six British Overseas Territories, three departments of France, three countries of the Kingdom of the Netherlands and three municipalities of the Netherlands proper.

The bishop from an American insular area, the United States Virgin Islands, has been granted observer status. The episcopal conference is led by a president, who must be a diocesan ordinary and is elected by the membership of the conference for a three-year term. The conference also elects a vice president, who has the same qualifications as the president, and a treasurer, who can be a diocesan ordinary, a coadjutor bishop, or an auxiliary bishop. Additionally, a permanent board —consisting of the president, vice president, treasurer, the metropolitan archbishops and two other elected members—handles administrative issues between plenary meetings of the conference. As of 2024, the president of the conference is Charles Jason Gordon, Archbishop of Port of Spain, while the vice president is John Derek Persaud, Bishop of Mandeville.

The Holy See appoints an apostolic delegate to the Antilles Episcopal Conference, who also serves as the apostolic nuncio (papal ambassador) to the independent nations of the conference. The nunciature is located in Port of Spain, Trinidad and Tobago. The current apostolic delegate is Archbishop Santiago De Wit Guzmán, who replaced Archbishop Fortunatus Nwachukwu after he was appointed as secretary of the Section of First Evangelization of the Dicastery for Evangelization.

== Member jurisdictions ==
(Arch)Diocese	(Arch)Bishop(s)	Covered secular Territor(y/ies)
Province of Castries
Archdiocese of Castries	Gabriel Malzaire	Saint Lucia
Diocese of Kingstown	Gerard County	Saint Vincent and the Grenadines
Diocese of Roseau	Kendrick Forbes	Dominica
Diocese of Saint George's in Grenada	Clyde Martin Harvey	Grenada
Diocese of Saint John's–Basseterre	Robert Llanos; Kenneth Richards (emeritus); Donald Reece (emeritus)	Antigua and Barbuda, St. Kitts and Nevis, Montserrat, Anguilla, and the British Virgin Islands
Province of Kingston
Archdiocese of Kingston in Jamaica	Kenneth Richards, Charles Dufour (emeritus); Donald Reece (emeritus)	Jamaica
Diocese of Belize City and Belmopan	Sede Vacante	Belize
Diocese of Mandeville	John Derek Persaud; Neil Edward Tiedemann, C.P.(emeritus); Gordon Bennett (emeritus)	Jamaica
Diocese of Montego Bay	Sede Vacante	Jamaica
Mission sui iuris of the Cayman Islands	Edward Weisenburger	Cayman Islands
Province of Nassau
Archdiocese of Nassau	Patrick Pinder	Bahamas
Diocese of Hamilton in Bermuda	Wiesław Śpiewak C.R.; Robert Kurtz, C.R. (emeritus)	Bermuda
Mission Sui Iuris of Turks and Caicos	Joseph W. Tobin	Turks and Caicos
Province of Port of Spain
Archdiocese of Port of Spain	Charles Jason Gordon; Joseph Harris C.S.Sp. (emeritus)	Trinidad and Tobago
Diocese of Bridgetown	Neil Sebastian Scantlebury	Barbados
Diocese of Georgetown	Francis Alleyne, O.S.B.	Guyana
Diocese of Paramaribo	Karel Choennie; Wilhelmus de Bekker (emeritus)	Suriname
Diocese of Willemstad	Sede Vacante; Luigi Secco (emeritus)	Aruba, Curaçao, Sint Maarten, and the Caribbean Netherlands (Bonaire, Sint Eustatius, and Saba)
Province of Fort-de-France
Archdiocese of Saint-Pierre and Fort-de-France	David Macaire; Gilbert Méranville (emeritus)	Martinique
Diocese of Basse-Terre and Pointe-à-Pitre	Jean-Yves Riocreux	Guadeloupe, along with Saint Barthélemy and Saint Martin
Diocese of Cayenne	Alain Ransay;Emmanuel Lafont (emeritus)	French Guiana
Observer
Diocese of St. Thomas	Jerome Feudjio	United States Virgin Islands

== See also ==
- List of Catholic dioceses (structured view)
- List of Catholic dioceses in the Caribbean
- Caribbean Conference of Churches

== Sources and external links ==
- Antilles Episcopal Conference
- GCatholic
