= Hurricane Dennis =

Category 4 Atlantic hurricane in 2005

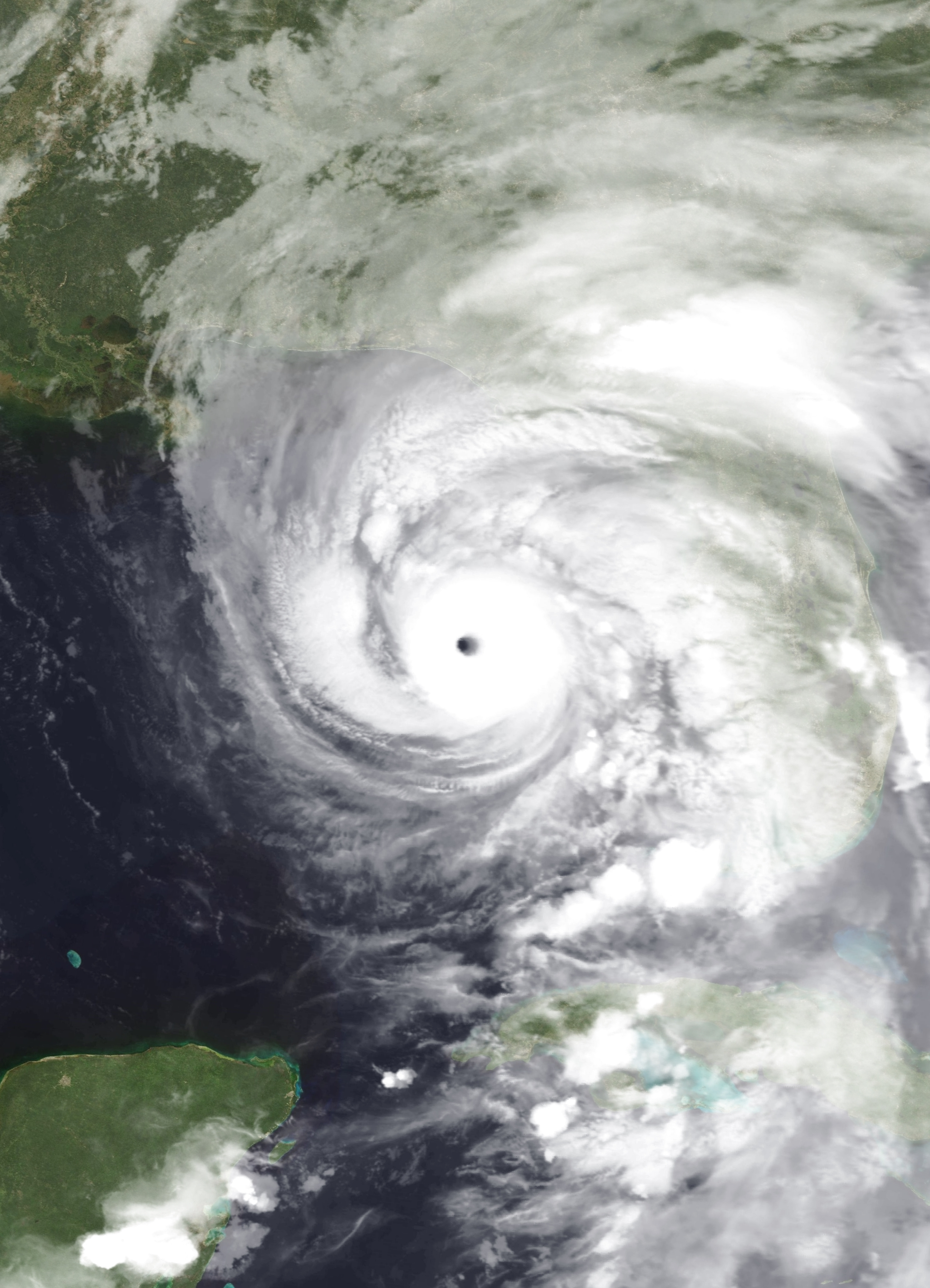
- Dennis shortly before its peak intensity while approaching the Florida panhandle on July 10

Meteorological history
- Formed: July 4, 2005
- Remnant low: July 13, 2005
- Dissipated: July 18, 2005

Category 4 major hurricane
- 1-minute sustained (SSHWS/NWS)
- Highest winds: 150 mph (240 km/h)
- Lowest pressure: 930 mbar (hPa); 27.46 inHg

Overall effects
- Fatalities: 90 (76 direct, 14 indirect)
- Damage: $3.98 billion (2005 USD)
- Areas affected: Windward Islands; Greater Antilles (particularly Cuba); Southeastern United States (particularly Florida); Great Lakes region; Canada
- IBTrACS
- Part of the 2005 Atlantic hurricane season

Hurricane Dennis was a deadly and destructive tropical cyclone that briefly held the record for the strongest Atlantic hurricane ever to form before August. Dennis was the fourth named storm of the record-breaking 2005 Atlantic hurricane season. It originated on July 4 near the Windward Islands from a tropical wave. Dennis intensified into a hurricane on July 6 as it moved across the Caribbean Sea. Two days later, it became a strong Category 4 hurricane on the Saffir-Simpson scale before striking Cuba twice on July 8. After weakening over land, Dennis re-intensified in the Gulf of Mexico, attaining its lowest barometric pressure of 930 mbar (27.46 inHg) on July 10. That day, Dennis weakened slightly before making a final landfall on Santa Rosa Island, Florida as a Category 3 hurricane. After moving through the central United States, the circulation associated with former Hurricane Dennis dissipated on July 18 over Ontario. While Dennis was still active as a tropical cyclone, it lost its status as the strongest hurricane before August to Hurricane Emily, which also moved through the Caribbean.

In the Caribbean, the outer bands of Hurricane Dennis brought tropical storm-force winds and heavy rain to parts of Haiti, resulting in floods and landslides. A total of 3,058 homes were damaged and 929 were destroyed. Hundreds of livestock were killed, causing significant harm to Haiti's agricultural industry. The storm resulted in 56 fatalities and caused approximately $50 million in damages. In Jamaica, Dennis produced 24.54 in (623 mm) of rainfall in Mavis Bank. The resultant floods severely affected Jamaica's agriculture industry, killing nearly 160,000 livestock and leaving around 100,000 customers without electricity. The storm killed one person in Jamaica and resulted in over $34.5 million in damages. In Cuba, rainfall peaked at 43 in (1,092 mm). Approximately 120,000 houses were damaged and 15,000 homes were destroyed. Nationwide, 2.5 million people lost access to water while 70% of the water sources in Granma Province were contaminated. Its agricultural industry was also affected, with almost 27,000 hectares (67,000 acres) of agricultural land being destroyed in the provinces of Cienfuegos and Granma. The impact led to 16 fatalities and caused an estimated $1.4 billion in damage to the country.

The impact of Hurricane Dennis on the United States was also significant, resulting in $2.5 billion in damages and 17 fatalities. More than 1 million people lost power, and a power worker was killed while restoring electricity in Alabama. In Florida, the hurricane brought hurricane-force winds as strong as 121 mph (195 km/h) to the Florida Panhandle, while rainfall reached 8.70 in (221 mm) in Bristol. Additionally, Dennis produced a 6 to 9 ft (2 to 3 m) storm surge, which caused significant flooding along Apalachee Bay, well east of the landfall. The estimated damages in Florida amounted to $1.5 billion, and the hurricane killed 14 people. In neighboring Alabama, Dennis brought hurricane-force winds, a 3–6.5 ft (1–2 m) storm surge, and heavy rainfall peaking at 12.80 in (325 mm) in Camden. Due to the extensive damage, the name Dennis was retired by the World Meteorological Organization.

== Meteorological history ==
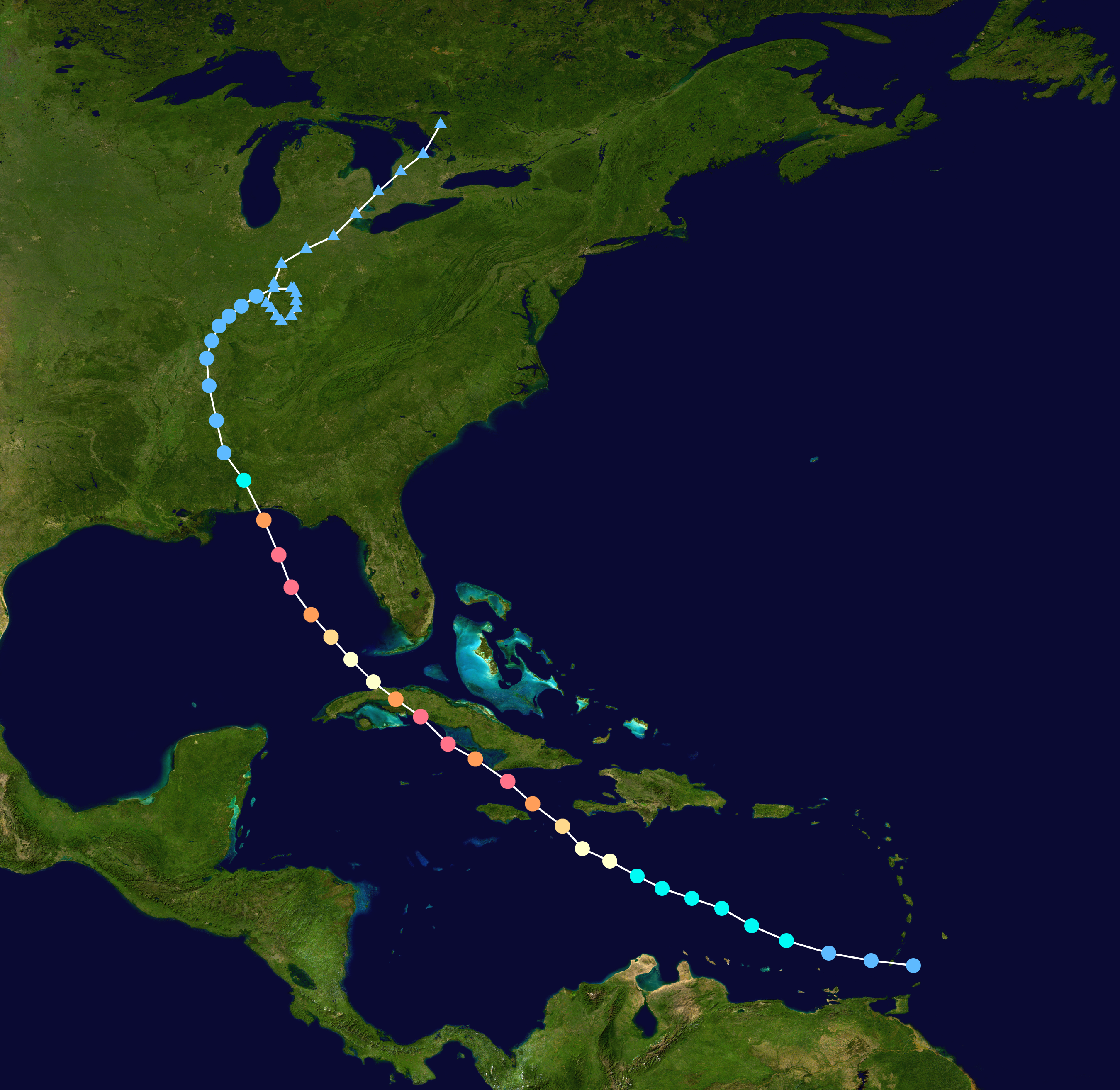
Map plotting the storm's track and intensity, according to the Saffir–Simpson scale Map key Saffir–Simpson scale Tropical depression (≤38 mph, ≤62 km/h) Tropical storm (39–73 mph, 63–118 km/h) Category 1 (74–95 mph, 119–153 km/h) Category 2 (96–110 mph, 154–177 km/h) Category 3 (111–129 mph, 178–208 km/h) Category 4 (130–156 mph, 209–251 km/h) Category 5 (≥157 mph, ≥252 km/h) Unknown Storm type Tropical cyclone Subtropical cyclone Extratropical cyclone, remnant low, tropical disturbance, or monsoon depression

The tropical wave that became Dennis was identified by the National Hurricane Center (NHC) on June 26, 2005, well inland over Africa. It moved to the west and later emerged into the Atlantic Ocean on June 29. Dry conditions over the Sahara initially inhibited development, though the wave found more favorable conditions and intensified into a tropical depression on July 4 while nearing the Windward Islands. The depression soon crossed the island country of Grenada before entering the Caribbean, where increasingly favorable environmental factors, such as low wind shear and high sea surface temperatures, fueled intensification. Turning west-northwest, the system achieved tropical storm status on July 5 and hurricane status the following day. The formation of a well-defined eye and central dense overcast signaled Dennis's intensification into a Category 3 hurricane on July 7, as it traversed the Jamaica Channel.

The powerful storm struck the western tip of Granma Province, Cuba, as a Category 4 hurricane early on July 8. Overland, Dennis weakened to Category 3 intensity, but it quickly moved back over water and regained its strength. Moving parallel to the southwestern coast of Cuba, Dennis reached its peak winds of 150 miles per hour (240 km/h). It soon weakened to winds of 140 mph (230 km/h) later that day because of an eyewall replacement cycle before making a second landfall in the country, this time in Matanzas Province. Interaction with the mountains of Cuba caused significant weakening; once Dennis emerged over the Gulf of Mexico on July 9, it quickly reorganized in favorable conditions. The hurricane reached Category 4 strength for the third time on July 10 as it approached Florida, attaining its lowest barometric pressure of 930 mbar (hPa; 27.46 inHg). This ranked Dennis as the strongest hurricane in the Atlantic basin to form before August; however, this record was broken just six days later by Hurricane Emily, which surpassed Dennis and attained Category 5 status. Weakening ensued as the hurricane approached the Florida Panhandle, the storm ultimately making landfall over Santa Rosa Island on July 10 as a Category 3. Weakening continued as the cyclone moved further inland, and the storm quickly lost tropical cyclone status. Dennis' remnant circulation remained, traversing the river valleys of the Mississippi and Ohio before finally dissipating over Ontario on July 18.

== Preparations ==
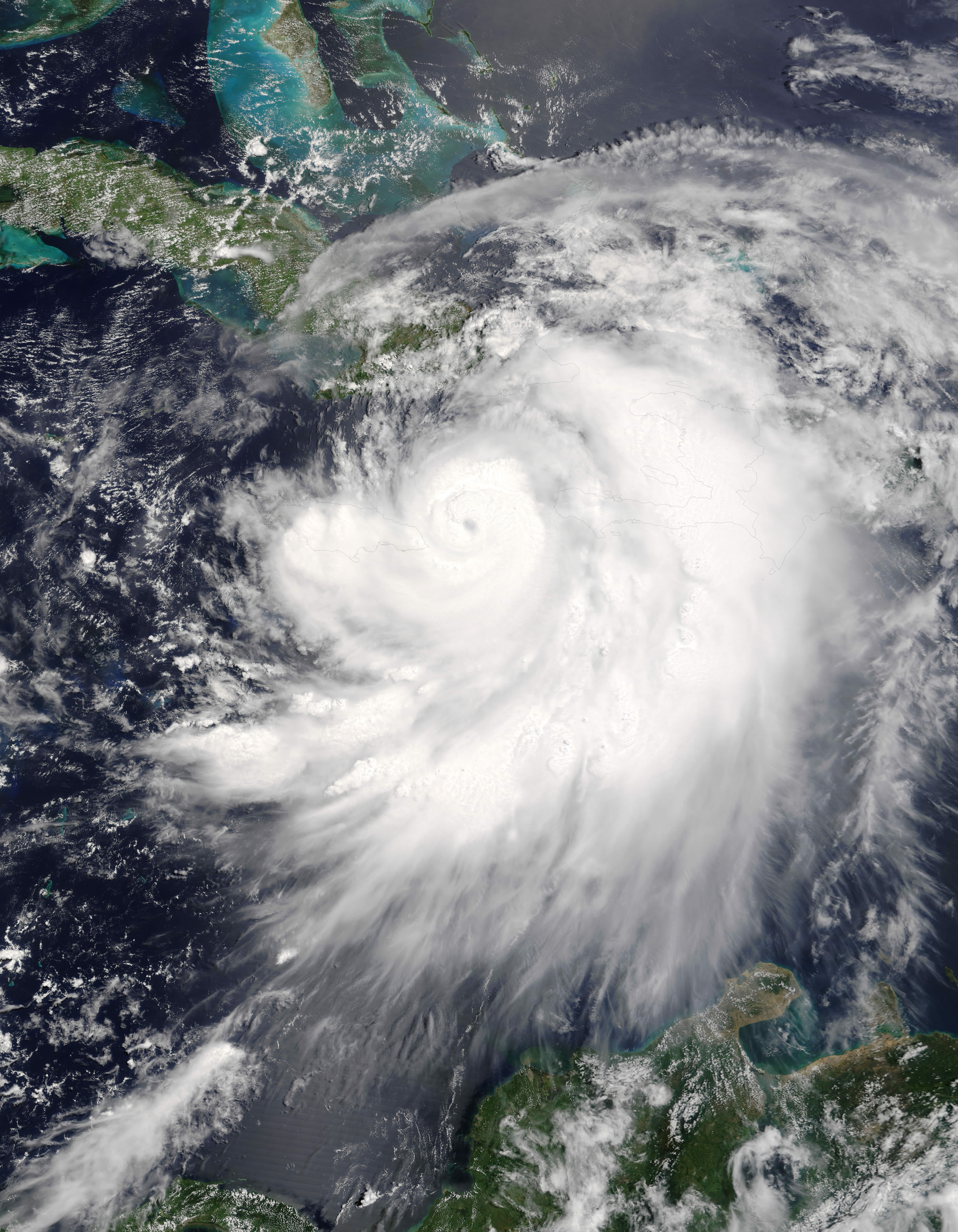
Hurricane Dennis intensifying between Jamaica and Haiti on July 7

=== Caribbean ===
Shortly after Dennis became a tropical storm on July 5, the Government of Haiti issued a tropical storm watch for parts of the country, later upgrading it to a hurricane warning. On July 6, Haiti's National Meteorological Center (Centre National de Météorologie) advised residents in elevated, exposed locations to evacuate due to the threat of strong winds. Officials warned residents of the potential of flooding and mudslides, and advised boats to remain at port. The nation was still recovering from the deadly Hurricane Jeanne in September 2004 when Dennis arrived, with about 550,000 people receiving assistance from the World Food Programme. The Haitian National Red Cross Society mobilized 300 personnel and identified ten potential shelters in the threatened region. The Pan American Disaster Response Unit branch of the Red Cross was equipped with supplies for 10,000 people and prepared to deploy. At least 700 people utilized these shelters in Les Cayes, Port-Salut, and the Grand'Anse.

Also on July 5, the Government of Jamaica issued a hurricane watch for the nation, upgrading it to a hurricane warning the next day. Jamaica opened 66 shelters across the island ahead of Dennis's arrival, which were used by about 6,000 people. The Jamaica Defence Force Coast Guard assisted with the evacuations of Pedro Bank and Morant Cays. Two airports, as well as ports, were closed during the storm. The Jamaican Red Cross placed volunteers and personnel on standby. Approximately J$25 million (US$405,000) was made available for relief operations through the nation's Disaster Mitigation Programme. An additional J$20 million (US$324,000) was allocated for clearing drains in preparation for heavy rain.

In the Cayman Islands, businesses closed and air traffic suspended during Dennis's passage. More than 300 people rode out the hurricane in a shelter. The islands were placed under a hurricane warning on July 7.

The government of Cuba issued a hurricane warning on July 6, which ultimately covered all of the country from Havana eastward. The government also issued a hurricane watch for extreme western Cuba and Isla de la Juventud. In preparation for Dennis, officials in Cuba forced more than 1.5 million people to evacuate, opening 1,804 evacuation centers. About 140,000 people mobilized to assist in preparations, including about 1,600 civil defense units. Among the evacuees were nearly 17,000 foreign tourists. Officials also stocked 978 food preparation centers. The United Nations sent officials to Cuba to be on standby before the storm arrived.

=== United States ===
On July 7, the NHC first started issuing watches and warnings for the southeastern United States, including a hurricane warning for the Florida Keys west of the Seven Mile Bridge. Over the next few days, the agency issued various watches and warnings for Florida and the northern coast of the Gulf of Mexico, with a hurricane warning between the Louisiana/Mississippi border to Steinhatchee, Florida. A tropical storm warning extended east of the area to Anclote Key, and westward to Grand Isle, Louisiana, including New Orleans. The NHC dropped all watches and warnings after Dennis weakened to tropical storm status as it moved inland. Due to the threat of the hurricane, about 1.8 million people in the southeastern United States evacuated. In the Gulf of Mexico, oil companies evacuated 81 platforms and 35 rigs, consisting of more than 1,100 people. The hurricane cut daily production by 220,000 barrels, which represented a 14.7% of oil that was shut-in, or restricted. The governors of Florida, Alabama, Mississippi, and Louisiana declared a state of emergency due to Dennis. The Red Cross put dozens of volunteers on standby to go into regions affected by the storm, opening 180 shelters along the Gulf Coast. The United States military responded by evacuating several facilities, including Naval Air Station Key West, NAS Pensacola, Eglin Air Force Base, Tyndall Air Force Base, and Hurlburt Field. The Air Force flew aircraft to other states.

In Florida, officials issued evacuation orders for about 50,000 people in the Florida Keys, a highly exposed chain of islands connected to the mainland by a single road and a series of bridges. People who stayed behind were advised to remain indoors. After the succession of hurricanes affecting the state in 2004, state officials were better prepared for Dennis, positioning fuel and generators. Officials removed and secured traffic signal heads to prevent damage on roads near Pensacola. As a result of the large evacuations, more than 200 truckloads provided about 1.8 million US gallons (6,800 m^{3}) of gasoline. About 6,000 Florida National guardsmen were mobilized, while guardsmen in Mississippi, Alabama, Louisiana, and Georgia were put on alert. At Cape Canaveral, NASA made preparations to potentially move Space Shuttle Discovery from the launch pad, but ultimately let the vehicle ride out the storm. Alabama Governor Bob Riley ordered traffic on Interstate 65 south of Montgomery to be northbound only on July 9, a process known as contraflow lane reversal, to provide additional capacity for evacuations. Mississippi closed its casinos ahead of the storm, despite resistance from the industry. The National Weather Service issued flood warnings for portion of northwestern Georgia, as well as tornado watches.

== Impact ==
Effects of Hurricane Dennis by country
Country	Deaths	Damage (USD)	Ref.
Haiti	56	$50 million	
Jamaica	1	$34.5 million	
Cuba	16	$1.4 billion	
United States	17	$2.5 billion	
Total	90	$3.98 billion	
Because of differing sources, totals may not match.

=== Caribbean ===
==== Haiti ====
The outer bands of Hurricane Dennis began impacting Haiti on July 6, flooding multiple roadways. Winds exceeded 50 mph (80 km/h) in Jacmel, Jérémie, and Les Cayes on that day. Widespread damage occurred across Sud department. Across the country, Dennis killed 56 people and injured another 36 people. The storm wrecked 929 homes and damaged 3,058 others, with damage estimated at US$50 million. Widespread agricultural losses took place, with hundreds of livestock killed. In Les Cayes, rivers over-topped their banks, high winds felled trees, 34 homes were damaged or destroyed, and the local hospital sustained significant damage. Flooding across the department of Ouest submerged multiple districts, particularly around Petit-Goâve. Several search and rescue missions took place in the commune. In nearby Grand-Goâve, a bridge collapsed after numerous people gathered atop it to view flood waters, killing at least nine people. At least 25 homes were destroyed in the commune. Damage was reported on Gonâve Island, with multiple homes collapsing. Throughout Grand'Anse, roughly 1,500 families were rendered homeless, 675 of which required urgent aid. During the storm, the commune of Beaumont was isolated by landslides.

==== Jamaica ====
Hurricane Dennis brushed Jamaica to the northeast, producing sustanied winds of 69 mph (111 km/h) at Montego Bay. The hurricane dropped torrential rainfall, reaching 24.54 in (623 mm) in Mavis Bank. This included a peak hourly rainfall total of 2.6 in (65 mm), and a 24 hour peak of 19.59 in (497.6 mm), a 1-in-100 year event. The rains caused flooding and landslides across the island. One person drowned after being swept away in the Negro River. The passage of the storm caused trees and power lines to be knocked down, leaving roughly 100,000 customers without electricity; most power outages were resolved within six days. Storm damage was estimated at J$2.128 billion (US$34.5 million), much of it to infrastructure or agriculture.

Across the island, flooding and landslides affected 121 communities. Communities in eastern Jamaica had damage to water systems, while much of the island had damage to roads and bridges. In Saint Thomas Parish, several rivers burst their banks, isolating or inundating villages, while landslides blocked 83 roads. The agricultural industry sustained extensive losses, including banana, coffee, cocoa, and domestic crops. Agriculture damage was estimated at J$500 million (US$8.1 million). Several buildings lost their roofs, including homes and schools. During the storm, an oil tank overflowed due to heavy rain at a Petrojam Refinery in Kingston Harbour, resulting in a minor oil spill that was cleaned within a day. Floods destroyed a water treatment plant in Yallahs. The hurricane wrecked two bridges – one in Mahoneyvale and another along the Yallahs River – and a bridge spanning the Rio Grande was severely damaged. In Saint Thomas Parish, floodwaters 10 ft (3.0 m) deep entered about 200 houses, leaving behind a layer of mud. Parts of Bull Bay remained under 4 ft (1.2 m) a day after the hurricane's passage. In Bull Bay, sand and mud covered 67 homes, prompting a proposal to relocate residents elsewhere to avoid future damage. A landslide in Mill Bank destroyed eight homes in Portland Parish, while a sink hole in Halse Hall engulfed 35 homes. In Saint Andrew Parish, the Mamee River swept away two homes. River flooding in Saint Mary Parish forced more than 500 people from their homes in Annotto Bay. Similarly, eight people required rescue in Saint Catherine Parish.

==== Cayman Islands ====
Despite passing just 82 mi (132 km) northeast of Cayman Brac, Dennis only produced wind gusts of 45 mph (72 km/h) in the Cayman Islands. Rainfall reached 0.41 in (10 mm) on Grand Cayman. The hurricane caused a brief power outage on Little Cayman.

==== Cuba ====
Dennis affected much of Cuba with hurricane-force winds, becoming the fourth major hurricane in four years to strike the country. At the hurricane's first landfall, Cape Cruz recorded sustained winds of 133 mph (215 km/h), with gusts to 148 mph (249 km/h), just before the eye passed over the area and the anemometer was destroyed. Farther west, Unión de Reyes recorded wind gusts of 123 mph (198 km/h). During its second landfall in the country, the eye of Dennis was over Cuba for about 11 hours, which resulted in significant impacts to almost the entire country. The hurricane produced torrential rainfall, with a peak of 43 in (1,092 mm). A station in Topes de Collantes in central Cuba recorded 27.67 in (703 mm) over a 24 hour period. The heavy rainfall caused widespread flooding, but also helped replenish groundwater supply, following years of drought. Dennis killed 16 people across the country – thirteen in Granma Province, two in Santiago de Cuba Province, and one in Sancti Spíritus Province. This made Dennis the deadliest hurricane in Cuba since Flora in 1963. Cuban President Fidel Castro estimated Dennis's damage at US$1.4 billion.

Throughout the country, Dennis damaged more than 120,000 houses to some degree. This included 15,000 homes that were destroyed, and 24,000 that lost their roofs, leaving about 73,000 people homeless. Most of the damaged houses were in southeastern Cuba, where the homes were generally in a state of structural deficiency. In Granma province alone, the hurricane destroyed 4,260 homes, and damaged 9,785 others; collectively the impacted structures represented 83% of the homes in the province. Dennis also damaged 360 schools in the province, including 29 that were destroyed. In the provinces of Cienfuegos and Granma, almost 27,000 hectares (67,000 acres) of agriculture land were destroyed by the storm. Dennis destroyed a sugar mill in Niquero. At Cape Cruz at the westernmost point of Granma, the hurricane washed boulders onto roadways. In Santiago de Cuba Province, the hurricane washed away more than 220 mi (350 km) of roads, including a bridge along the Río Mogote. Several national parks sustained damage, while Pico Turquino, Cuba's highest point, lost half of its trees. More than 2.5 million people lost access to water during the storm, forcing many residents to rely on water tankers. Floods contaminated running water, and 70% of the water sources in Granma Province were contaminated.

The hurricane disrupted communications across Cuba. The winds knocked down radio and television towers, phone lines, and power poles. To prevent damage to the electric generation stations, power was halted nationwide, and it began to be restored on July 11. The outages left some cities without power for two days, including the capital, Havana. Downed trees and debris blocked roads, with more than 12 mi (20 km) of rail lines washed out. Dennis also disrupted the nation's agriculture industry, ruining about 360,000 tons of citrus fruit, destroying 11,000 hectares (27,000 acres) of bananas, and killing about 73,000 livestock birds.

=== United States ===
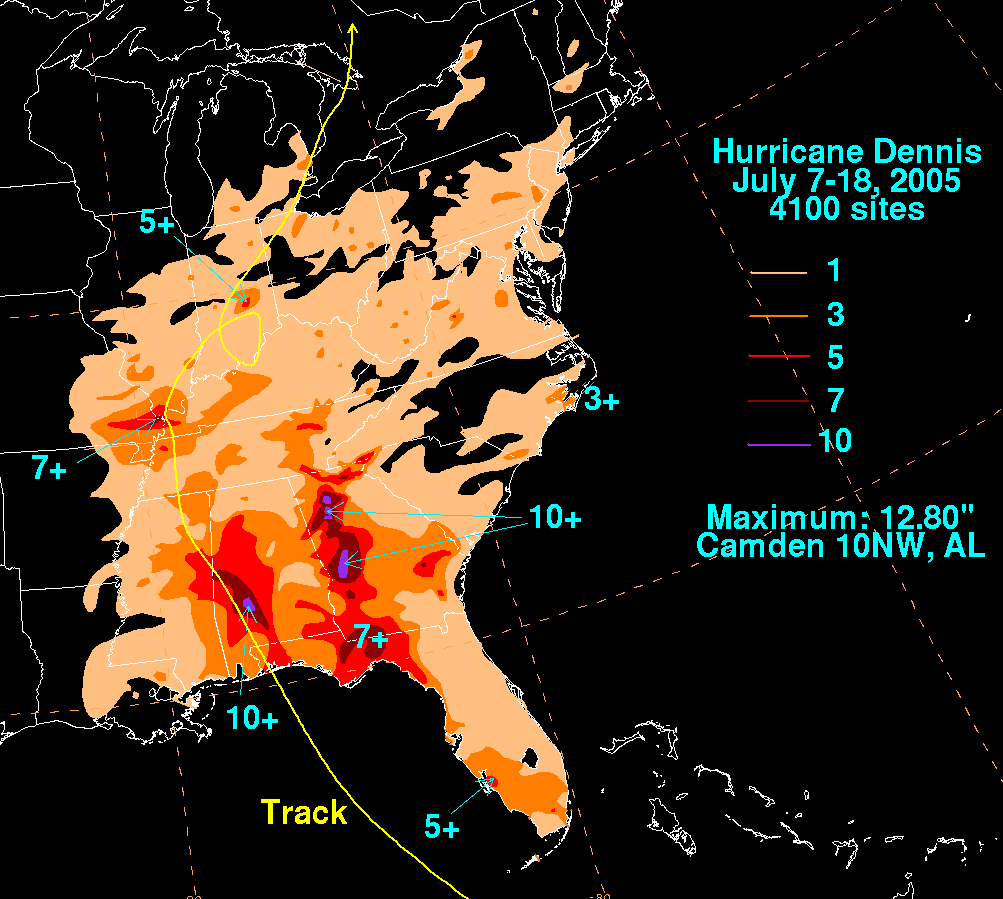
Rainfall map for Hurricane Dennis in the United States

Throughout the southeastern United States, Hurricane Dennis resulted in 17 fatalities – 14 in Florida, 1 in Mississippi, 1 in Alabama, and 1 in Georgia – as well as about US$2.5 billion in damage.

==== Florida ====
Hurricane Dennis affected much of Florida, from the Florida Keys to the panhandle. Although Dennis made landfall as a major hurricane, the strongest winds were confined to a small area near the eye. A station at Navarre recorded sustained winds of 99 mph (159 km/h), with gusts to 121 mph (195 km/h). Rainfall in the state reached 8.70 in (221 mm) at a station near Bristol. The hurricane spawned nine tornadoes in the state, all but one rated an F0 on the Fujita scale. The other was an F1 tornado that struck Bradenton and destroyed a barn. Dennis also moved ashore with a 6 to 9 ft (2 to 3 m) storm surge, which inundated coastal areas along the panhandle and eastward to Apalachee Bay. The hurricane caused 14 fatalities in the state. A boat sank in the Florida Keys, killing one of its occupants. In Dania Beach, a swimmer drowned amid high seas. The remaining fatalities were indirectly related to the hurricane. Four people died from automobile accidents – three were in Port Charlotte when their vehicle overturned, and the other occurred in Walton County while evacuating. Two people died from electrocution, and another two people died from carbon monoxide poisoning. There were two deaths related to accidents cleaning up after the storm and another two deaths exacerbated by storm stress. Damage in the state totaled over US$1.5 billion. Along the Florida panhandle, 448 buildings sustained severe damage from the hurricane. Across southern Florida from Tampa southward to the Keys, Dennis left about 439,600 people without power, while across the Florida panhandle, another 322,275 people lost power.

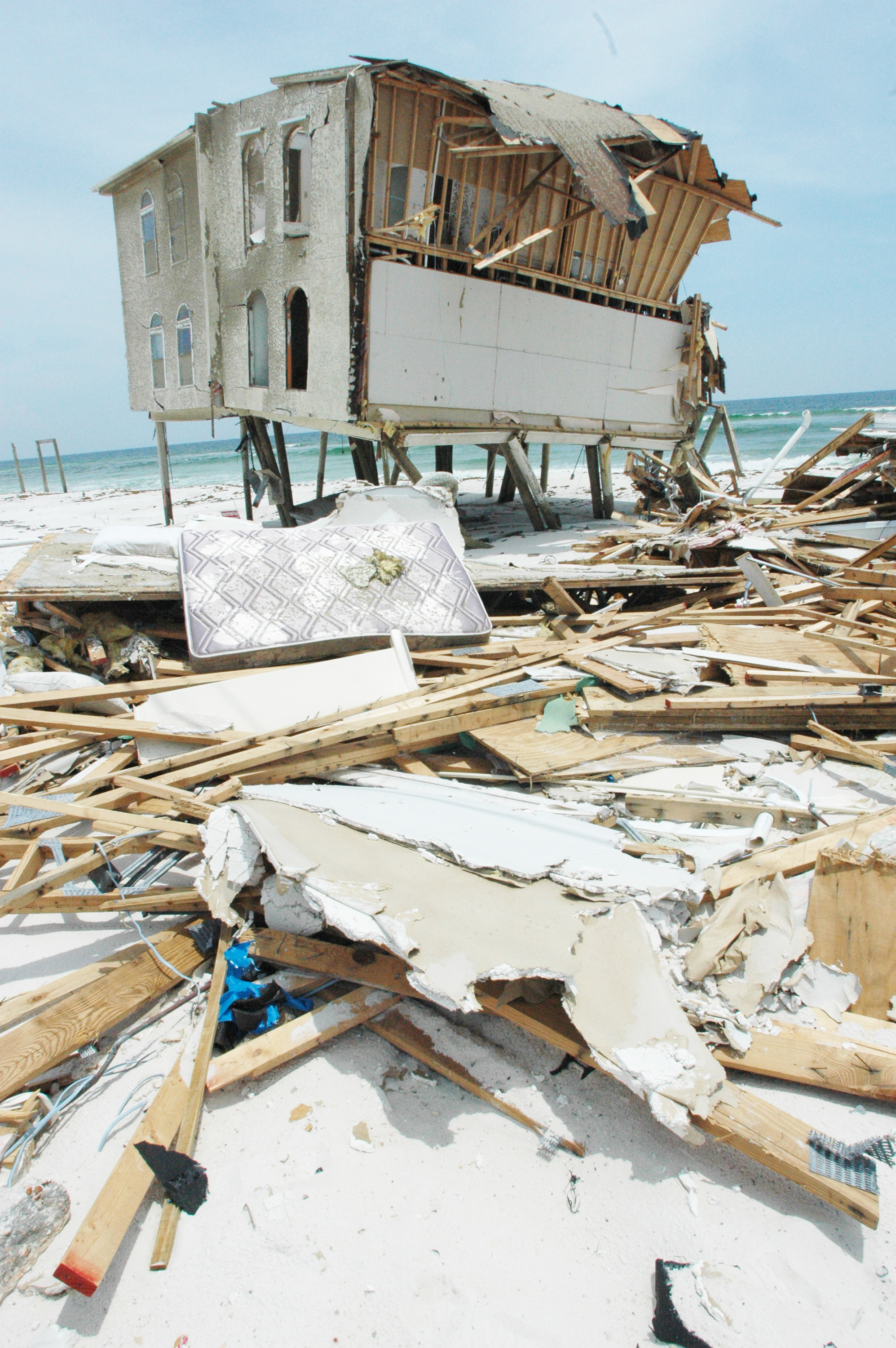
A beachfront home in Navarre Beach, Florida largely destroyed by Hurricane Dennis

The most significant coastal flooding occurred along Apalachee Bay, with a storm tide of 8.11 ft (2.47 m) recorded in Apalachicola, about 175 mi (282 km) east of Dennis' landfall. The water levels in the region were about 3.5 ft (1.1 m) higher than anticipated by the Sea, Lake, and Overland Surge from Hurricanes computer model. The NHC determined that the high tides were "likely triggered by an oceanic trapped shelf wave that propagated northward along the Florida west coast." The high tides significantly damaged St. George Island State Park, including 80% of the park's dunes and boardwalks. About 5 mi (8.0 km) of roads were damaged, including a portion of the St. George Island Bridge near the park's entrance. On the island, the hurricane destroyed 23 homes and damaged another 141, with damage estimated at US$9.1 million. Floodwaters swept away seaside cottages in St. Teresa and Alligator Point in Franklin County, while also wrecking dune systems. Along the St. Marks River, eight people in the community of the same name required rescue, after waters reached waist deep. Across neighboring Wakulla County, the floods damaged 487 buildings and destroyed 24 others. The high waters significantly damaged part of the Big Bend Wildlife Management Area, a wildlife refuge in Taylor County.

Dennis first affected the state when it passed about 75 mi (120 km) southwest of Key West, producing a storm surge of 3 to 5 ft (1 to 2 m). Parts of Duval Street were flooded 1.5 ft (0.46 m) deep. The city recorded wind gusts of 74 mph (119 km/h), and there was an unofficial observation of 109 mph (175 km/h) gusts at Cudjoe Key. Damage in the Florida Keys totaled US$6.8 million, mostly related to roofing, electric equipment, and landscaping. Key West International Airport sustained about US$100,000 in damage. Across southern Florida, gusty winds and rainfall knocked down trees and power lines, with some minor coastal flooding. One beneficial effect of Hurricane Dennis was that it flipped over the former USS Spiegel Grove, which was deliberately sunk in 2002 in the Florida Keys National Marine Sanctuary in an attempt to create an artificial reef; for three years the navy ship had been upside-down. Along the rest of Florida's west coast, storm tides were 3 to 5 ft (1 to 2 m) above normal. The high waves destroyed 60 sea turtle nests in Pinellas County. In St. Petersburg, a yacht sank while docking at a marina, and six other boats sustained damage during the hurricane. In Cedar Key, floodwaters closed the airport and several roads, causing damage to 20 businesses.

Along the Florida panhandle, Dennis severely damaged about 200 houses, with nearly every structure in Navarre Beach damaged, and the Navarre pier damaged by the high waves. Dennis damaged areas that were still recovering from Hurricane Ivan, which had struck southern Alabama ten months earlier. Extensive beach erosion occurred along the panhandle from Pensacola to Destin, undoing the dune restoration efforts after Ivan. A portion of U.S. Route 98 was washed out between Fort Walton Beach and Destin, which took a month to be repaired. In Cinco Bayou, lightning struck a boat and set it ablaze. A portion of I-10 in Pensacola flooded during the storm due to poor drainage. The Eglin Air Force Base and Hurlburt Field sustained more than US$500 million in damage. On Holiday Island in Destin, the waves washed out a home while severely damaging houses and apartment buildings. In McDavid, the storm tore off the roof of a recreation center while 12 people were inside. Most of the cotton crop across the panhandle was damaged.

==== Rest of the Gulf Coast ====
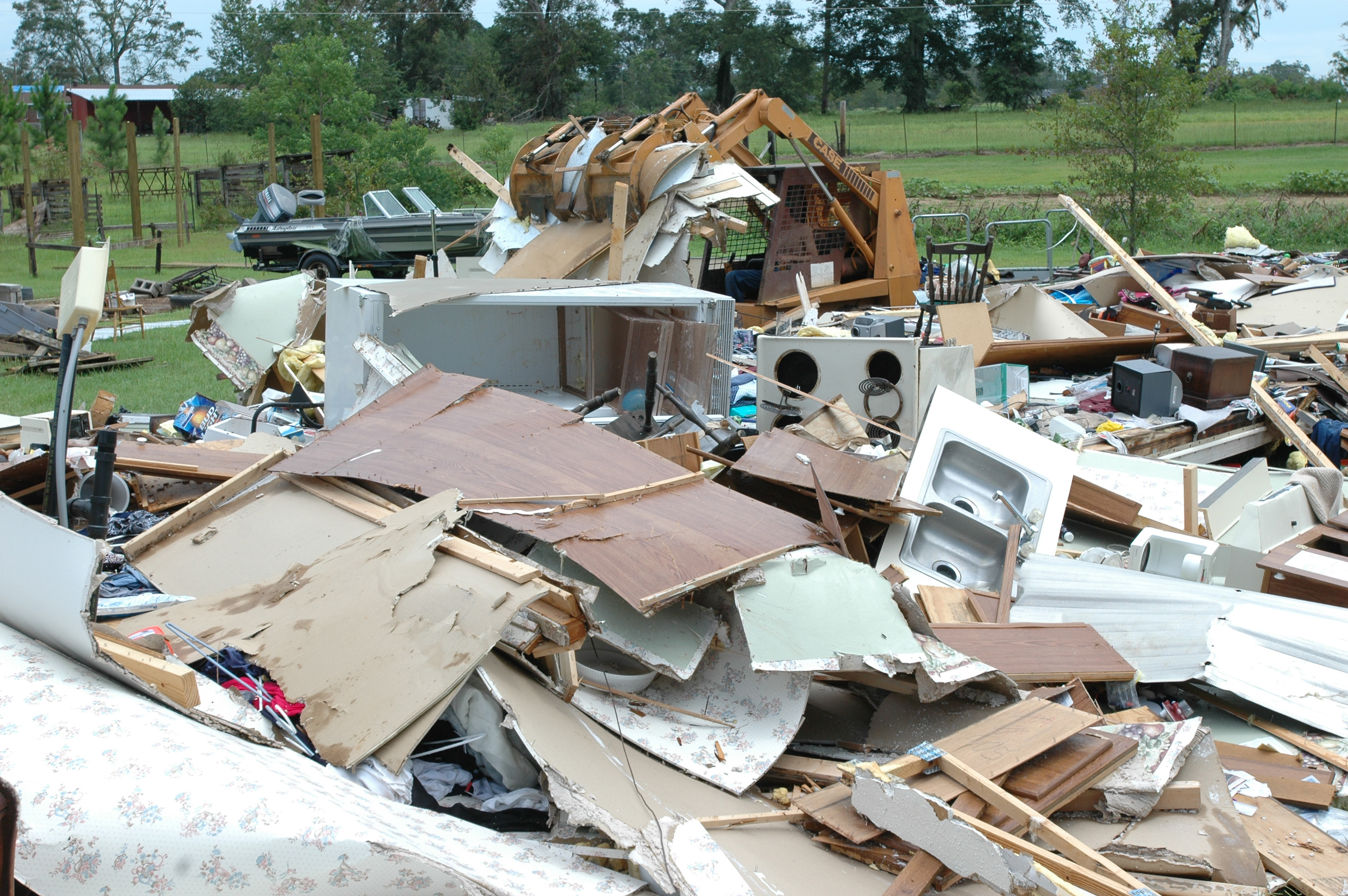
A house destroyed by high winds in Alabama

When Hurricane Dennis moved into southeastern Alabama, it produced hurricane-force winds in inland areas of the state. The highest wind gust in the state was 77 mph (124 km/h), recorded on the USS Alabama in Mobile Bay. The heaviest rainfall from Dennis in the country was 12.80 in (325 mm), recorded at a station near Camden. The rains caused numerous rivers to overflow, resulting in flash flooding that entered homes and covered roads up to 5 ft (1.5 m) deep. The hurricane left about US$120 million in damage in the state, with the worst effects in Escambia and Monroe counties. High winds knocked down trees, some of which fell onto houses, vehicles, and businesses. The high winds also damaged the state's cotton industry. Across the state, the storm left 291,128 people without power. A power worker died in Flomaton while making electrical repairs following the storm. In Dallas and Montgomery counties, downed trees caused an injury after hitting a vehicle, while a driver was injured in Clay County after hitting a fallen tree. Along the coast, storm tides reached 7.2 ft (2.2 m) at Fort Morgan, causing coastal flooding in southern Alabama. In central Alabama, floodwaters washed away several bridges, and parts of I-20 in Calhoun County were inundated. A mudslide closed a portion of Alabama State Route 5 in Dallas County near Selma. Flooding also closed portions of U.S. routes 78, 80, and 82, as well as county and local roads. Several houses, vehicles, and businesses were damaged by the fallen trees. Downed power lines sparked building fires in Greene, Randolph, and Russell counties.

Farther west of the center, the effects were not as severe, although damaging winds and rainfall occurred in eastern Mississippi. Winds in the state reached 59 mph (95 km/h) in Meridian. The winds and rainfall knocked down hundreds of trees and power lines across the state, damaging 21 homes, as well as a church. Slick roads led to a traffic death in Jasper County. The storm tide reached 3.36 ft (1.02 m) in Biloxi. Throughout the state, about 14,200 people lost power. Damage was estimated at US$2.6 million. Gale-force wind gusts occurred as far west as the lakefront of New Orleans, which recorded gusts of 47 mph (76 km/h).

==== Other areas ====
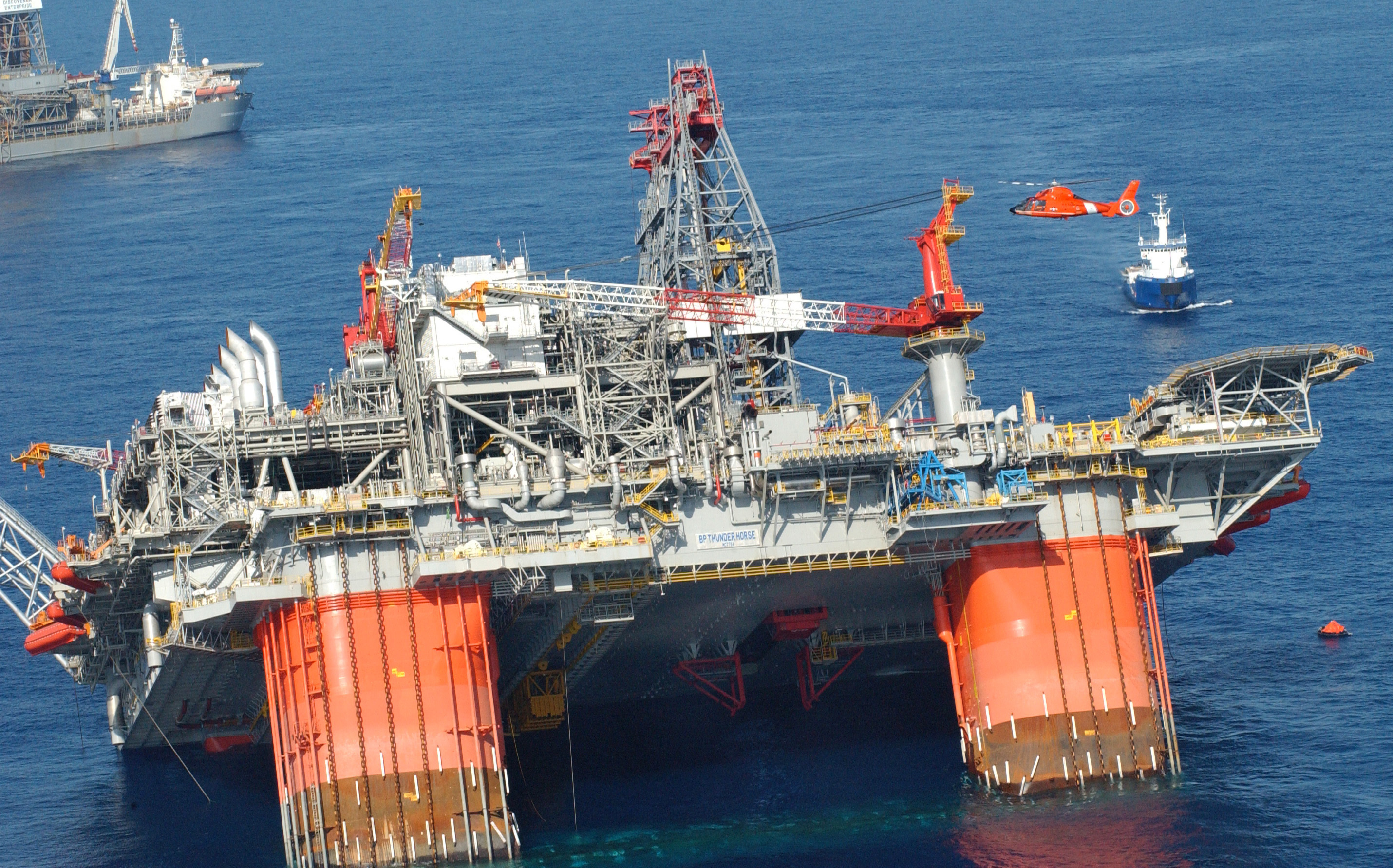
The Thunder Horse PDQ oil platform after the passage of Hurricane Dennis, tilted to a 30º list

Offshore in the Gulf of Mexico, the Thunder Horse oil platform tilted to a 30º list after the vessel was evacuated and the structure's ballast tanks were flooded. The tilting was caused by a pipe being incorrectly installed as the Thunder Horse was being prepared for service. Within five days of Dennis's landfall, the structure was refloated and taken to Texas to be repaired, and the connecting pipes on the ocean floor were also repaired. The repair costs were estimated at $250 million. The hurricane's passage also caused an algae bloom in the eastern Gulf of Mexico, although conditions returned to normal within ten days of the storm.

Across western Georgia, Dennis produced wind gusts as high as 43 mph (68 km/h) in Albany. The winds were strong enough to knock down trees, one of which killed a man in Decatur. About 55,000 people lost power in the Atlanta area. Damage across northern Georgia was estimated at over US$12 million, with hundreds of roads damaged or washed out. A rainband stalled over western Georgia, with a rainfall total of 10.88 in (276 mm) recorded near Mableton. The rains caused flash flooding, just days after the region was soaked by the remnants of Hurricane Cindy. In Milledgeville, rains from the storm caused a fitness center to collapse, injuring two people. In Upson County, a motorist was injured while trying to cross a damaged roadway, and was later rescued. In Cobb and Douglas counties, several areas experienced 100-year flooding, reaching 6 ft (1.8 m) deep in some areas. The Sweetwater Creek swelled to a record crest of 21.8 ft (6.6 m), breaking the previous record set in 1916. The floods damaged 700 homes between the two counties, as well as 55 roads and bridges. The floodwaters damaged about 120 cars at a Ford dealership. In Austell, several people required rescue from a building. In Woodstock in Cherokee County, the Noonday Creek swelled to a record crest of 16.3 ft (5.0 m), surpassing the peak set during Hurricane Ivan. The floodwaters inundated an apartment complex, forcing residents to evacuate by boat, as well as flooding dozens of cars and homes. Floods forced the evacuation of 300 homes in Worth County and 100 homes in Colquitt County. In Clayton County, floods damaged 14 mobile homes beyond repair, with 52 residents in the community having to move to a shelter. In Atlanta, flooding closed a ramp to I-20, while portions of I-285 were restricted to one lane. In Forsyth County, a tractor trailer carrying fuel overturned, temporarily closing the road. The floodwaters breached a dam near Fayetteville and another in Tift County, flooding nearby areas. In Stockbridge, the rains caused a sewage treatment plant to spill 53,000 U.S. gallons (200,000 liters) of wastewater. In White County, an F0 tornado destroyed two barns and severely damaged the roof of a house, while also knocking down about 200 trees.

Outside of Georgia, Dennis also produced heavy rainfall in western North Carolina, reaching 9.20 in (234 mm) in Rosman. Rainfall in South Carolina peaked at 8.90 in (226 mm) at a station near Lake Jocassee. In nearby Tennessee, rains from the storm reached 6.78 in (172 mm) at Oak Ridge. Across south-central Tennessee, gusty winds caused scattered power outages and tree damage. Heavy rainfall extended into Kentucky, with a total of 9.56 in (243 mm) recorded near Bardwell. The remnants of Dennis meandered over Indiana for two days, producing heavy rainfall that reached 5.03 in (128 mm) in Cairo, Illinois. The rains were beneficial to corn farmers while alleviating drought conditions. Precipitation from Dennis extended as far north as Michigan, with a total of 4.04 in (103 mm) recorded near Richmond.

== Aftermath ==
Because of the significant damage and death toll caused by the hurricane in the Caribbean and United States, the name Dennis was retired by the World Meteorological Organization in the spring of 2006, and will never again be used for an Atlantic hurricane. It was replaced with Don for the 2011 hurricane season.

=== Haiti ===
After flash floods affected southern Haiti, the Civil Protection Department released 5 million gourdes (US$120,500) in emergency funds. Médecins Sans Frontières, the United Nations Stabilization Mission in Haiti, the World Food Programme, and other international agencies mobilized for relief efforts on this day. The International Red Cross (IFRC) provided 250,000 Swiss francs (US$192,000) from its Disaster Response Emergency Fund. By July 15, Haiti's government requested international assistance to handle the aftermath of Hurricane Dennis. Japan was the first nation to comply, providing emergency supplies—such as blankets, generators, and radios—worth ¥11 million (US$97,900). The United States Agency for International Development (USAID) released US$50,000 in disaster funds. World Concern provided kids with food and basic supplies to 18,000 people. On July 15, the Inter-American Development Bank announced a US$5 million program to establish an early-warning system for floods across Haiti. In conjunction with funds to alleviate strain from a drought preceding Dennis, the European Commission provided Haiti with €400,000 (US$477,000). Hurricane Emily affected the region a week after Dennis, although the effects were limited compared to Dennis. The IFRC's relief operation began on August 5, with a focus on distribution of hygiene and sanitation items. Approximately 4,000 people affected by Dennis and a further 1,000 by Emily were targeted in their program.

=== Jamaica ===
Distribution of relief supplies in Jamaica began on July 7, and a day later, supplies were airlifted to isolated communities. Residents in Portland Parish were advised to boil water due to contamination. Repairs and restoration of damaged roadways costed J$405 million (US$6.56 million). After the Rio Grande bridge was damaged, a previously defunct railway bridge was reopened on July 30 to enable travel. Residents in Cascade required evacuation by airlift, and Mill Bank was declared a disaster area. The Salvation Army assisted with relief efforts. Audley Shaw, leader of the opposition party, requested the Jamaican government release J$500 million (US$8.1 million) for immediate relief; however, Prime Minister P. J. Patterson rejected the proposal. Although the Government of Jamaica indicated it would not request international assistance, the Government of Cuba provided 11 tons of supplies and Venezuela offered support. Japan provided J$5.5 million (US$88,266) to help 500 farmers in Portland Parish. The long-term effects of Dennis were limited, with nearly every economic sector returning to normal within a few months. The only exceptions were exports of banana and coffee crops, both of which were still recovering from Hurricane Ivan in 2004. Overall implications to the nation's gross domestic product were negligible, merely flat-lining growth rather than causing decline. However, in combination with the effects of a drought early in 2005, inflation rose from 9% to 14.3%. Manufacturing companies reported J$18.3 million (US$296,000) in losses, primarily from suspended operations.

=== Cuba ===
In Cuba, many families who lost their homes stayed in schools that were closed for the summer break. Medical teams and cleanup brigades helped the injured, while removing fallen trees and debris. A force of 3,500 electricians restored nearly all of the power lines by July 19, or 11 days after the hurricane struck. Tens of thousands of people replanted crops with a short growing cycle. By a week after the storm, most railroads and highways were cleared of debris and fallen trees. The government distributed about 220,000 tons of food to people affected by the hurricane. In the month after the storm, more than 7,000 roofs were repaired. The United Nations Office for the Coordination of Humanitarian Affairs authorized US$60,000 toward emergency supplies. The government of Venezuela sent a ship with power restoration supplies. The German NGO Welthungerhilfe provided 125 families with housing repair tools, cooking utensils, and mattresses. Japan sent US$100,000 to the World Food Programme (WFP) to purchase 191 tons of rice for people in Granma Province. The WFP launched a US$490,000 program to feed about 110,000 people affected by Dennis. The agency also launched a larger US$3.7 million program to help 773,000 Cubans affected by the drought and food insecurity. The European Union and United States both offered assistance, which was rejected. President Castro stated he would never accept aid from the United States until the economic sanctions and embargoes, in place since 1959, were dropped. In a July 26 speech, Castro announced the beginning of the Energy Revolution, after the hurricane's significant damage to the nation's power grid. In the months after the hurricane, the mortality rate in the country was higher than normal. The high amounts of rainfall caused a decline in phytobenthos algae in Cienfuegos Bay, after waters had a drop in salinity. Monthly precipitation totals for July 2005 were 265% of the normal.

=== United States ===
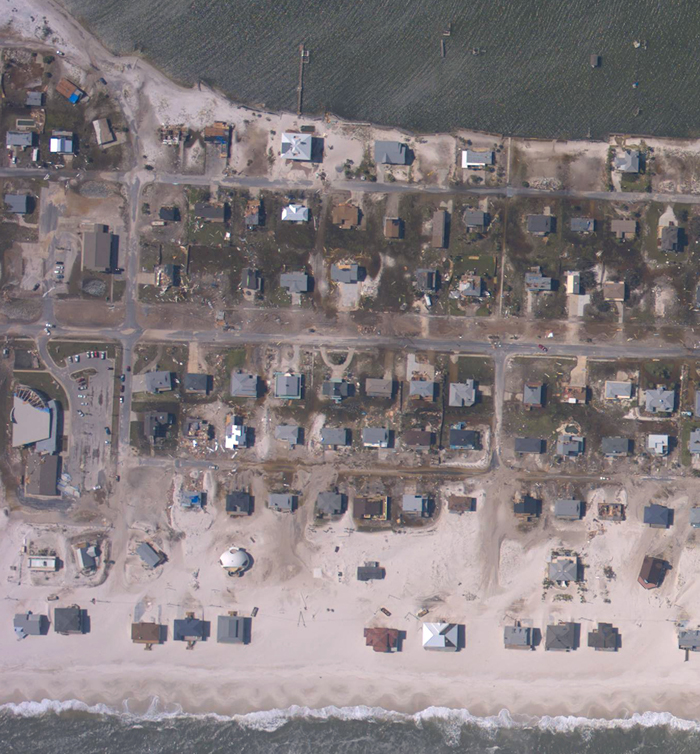
Aerial image of Pensacola Beach, Florida after Dennis

Due to storm damage across the southeastern U.S. states, president George W. Bush declared a federal disaster area for 20 counties in Florida, 49 counties in Alabama, and 38 counties in Mississippi. The declaration allocated funds for emergency services and debris removal and to help rebuild essential public facilities. The Federal Emergency Management Agency (FEMA) opened 18 disaster recovery centers in Alabama and Florida. All but four of them were in Florida, which were visited by more than 20,000 residents before the centers closed in October. Florida received US$118.5 million from the Federal Highway Administration. Most of the repair costs were in Franklin County, about 150 mi (240 km) east of Dennis' landfall location. The state also received more than $220 million in public and individual funds for 21,150 people. The American Red Cross operated more than 100 emergency response vehicles, providing thousands of meals across the Gulf Coast. Supplies of food, water and ice were supplied from staging areas to distribution centers throughout the Florida panhandle. The American Red Cross and other voluntary agencies assisted with food and water distribution as well as emergency needs and housing. Voluntary agencies such as AmeriCorps, the Christian Contractors Association and the United Way provided assistance to residents who had temporary roofing and repair needs. Alabama received nearly $25 million in public and individual funds for 4,468 people. Mississippi received about $1.7 million from FEMA toward emergency funds. After the high wave damaged coastal shrubs in the Florida keys, subsequent hurricanes Rita and Wilma caused additional flooding damage, which disrupted butterfly habitats. In the decade after Dennis, many of the damaged coastal properties along the Florida panhandle were reconstructed to have parking on the ground level instead of apartments to reduce potential damage.

== See also ==
- Tropical cyclones in 2005
- List of Florida hurricanes (2000–present)
- List of wettest tropical cyclones in Cuba
- List of wettest tropical cyclones in the United States
- List of Category 4 Atlantic hurricanes
- Hurricane Georges (1998) – Another Category 4 hurricane that produced similar effects in the Gulf Coast Region as a Category 2 storm
- Hurricane Gustav (2008) – A Category 4 hurricane that took a similar track before striking southern Louisiana as a Category 2 storm
- Hurricane Elsa (2021) – A Category 1 hurricane that had a similar path, and affected similar areas
