= List of Catholic dioceses in the Caribbean =

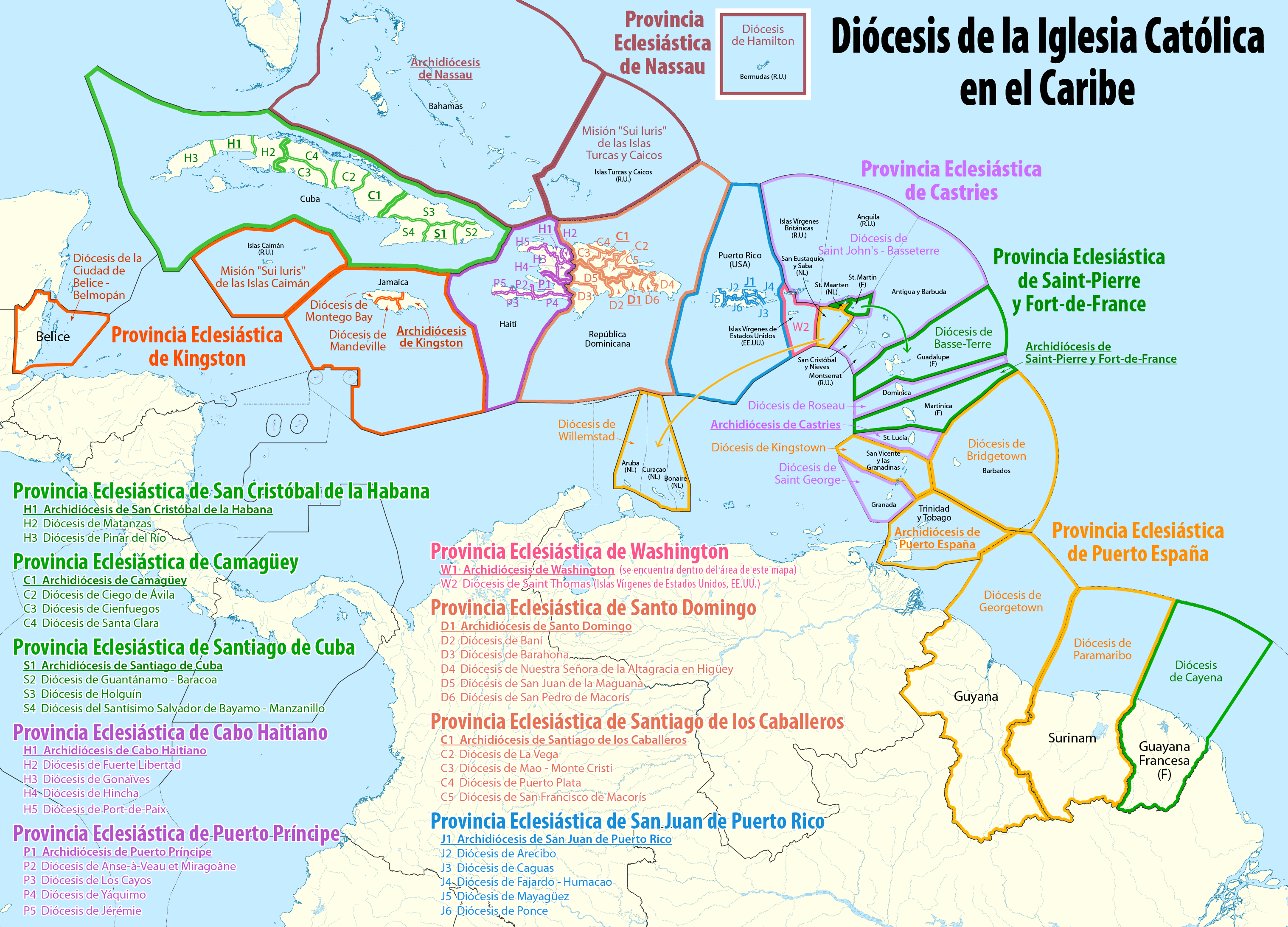
Catholic Ecclesiastical Provinces and Dioceses in the Caribbean. (in Spanish)

The Catholic Church in the Caribbean comprises thirteen ecclesiastical provinces — each headed by a metropolitan archbishop — plus one diocese that is part of a non-Caribbean province. Each province has an archdiocese (headed by an archbishop) and one or more suffragan dioceses (headed by a bishop). Each diocesan bishop, coadjutor bishop, and auxiliary bishop — active and retired — belongs to one of the episcopal conferences listed below.

There are also two missions sui iuris in the Caribbean. All of those listed are members of the Antilles Episcopal Conference, including three, the Diocese of Georgetown, Diocese of Cayenne and the Diocese of Paramaribo which are located in South America in the dependencies Guyana, French Guiana, and Suriname respectively. Also a member of the Antilles Conference is the Diocese of Belize City-Belmopan on the mainland in Belize.

Each of the Greater Antilles — Haiti, Cuba, the Dominican Republic and Puerto Rico — has its own conference. An exception is the Diocese of Saint Thomas in the United States Virgin Islands, whose bishop is a member of the United States Conference of Catholic Bishops and an Observer to the Antilles Conference.

== Antilles Episcopal Conference ==
=== Ecclesiastical province of Castries ===
- Archdiocese of Castries
- Diocese of Kingstown
- Diocese of Roseau
- Diocese of Saint George's in Grenada
- Diocese of Saint John's–Basseterre

=== Ecclesiastical province of Fort-de-France ===
- Archdiocese of Fort-de-France
- Diocese of Basse-Terre

=== Ecclesiastical province of Kingston in Jamaica ===
- Archdiocese of Kingston in Jamaica
- Diocese of Mandeville
- Diocese of Montego Bay
- Mission sui iuris of Cayman Islands

=== Ecclesiastical province of Nassau ===
- Archdiocese of Nassau
- Diocese of Hamilton in Bermuda
- Mission sui iuris of Turks and Caicos

=== Ecclesiastical province of Port of Spain ===
- Archdiocese of Port of Spain
- Diocese of Bridgetown
- Diocese of Willemstad

== Episcopal Conference of Cuba ==
=== Ecclesiastical province of San Cristobal de la Habana ===
- Archdiocese of San Cristóbal de la Habana
- Diocese of Matanzas
- Diocese of Pinar del Rio

=== Ecclesiastical province of Santiago de Cuba ===
- Archdiocese of Santiago de Cuba
- Diocese of Guantánamo-Baracoa
- Diocese of Holguín
- Diocese of Santísimo Salvador de Bayamo y Manzanillo

=== Ecclesiastical province of Camagüey ===
- Archdiocese of Camagüey
- Diocese of Ciego de Avila
- Diocese of Cienfuegos
- Diocese of Santa Clara

== Episcopal Conference of the Dominican Republic ==
=== Ecclesiastical province of Santo Domingo ===
- Archdiocese of Santo Domingo
- Diocese of Baní
- Diocese of Barahona
- Diocese of Nuestra Señora de la Altagracia en Higüey
- Diocese of San Juan de la Maguana
- Diocese of San Pedro de Macorís

=== Ecclesiastical province of Santiago de los Caballeros ===
- Archdiocese of Santiago de los Caballeros
- Diocese of La Vega
- Diocese of Mao-Monte Cristi
- Diocese of Puerto Plata
- Diocese of San Francisco de Macorís

== Episcopal Conference of Haiti ==
=== Ecclesiastical province of Cap-Haïtien ===
- Archdiocese of Cap-Haïtien
- Diocese of Fort-Liberté
- Diocese of Granada
- Diocese of Hinche
- Diocese of Les Gonaïves
- Diocese of Port-de-Paix

=== Ecclesiastical province of Port-au-Prince ===
- Archdiocese of Port-au-Prince
- Diocese of Jacmel
- Diocese of Jérémie
- Diocese of Les Cayes

== Puerto Rican Episcopal Conference ==
The Metropolitan Province of San Juan de Puerto Rico comprises the United States Commonwealth of Puerto Rico. (The bishops of the province form their own episcopal conference, the Conferencia Episcopal Puertorriqueña.)

=== Ecclesiastical Province of San Juan de Puerto Rico ===
See: List of the Catholic bishops of the United States#Province of San Juan de Puerto Rico

- Archdiocese of San Juan de Puerto Rico
- Diocese of Arecibo
- Diocese of Caguas
- Diocese of Fajardo-Humacao
- Diocese of Mayagüez
- Diocese of Ponce

== United States Conference of Catholic Bishops ==
=== Ecclesiastical Province of Washington ===
- Diocese of St. Thomas
