= St. Mary's College, Jamaica =

St. Mary's College

Location
- Above Rocks, Saint Catherine; Jamaica
- 18.1°N 76.8833°W

Information
- Motto: Always to Excel
- Religious affiliation: Christian
- Denomination: Roman Catholic
- Founded: 1955
- Founder: Father Edmond Cheaney S.J
- Status: Open
- Oversight: The St. Mary's Mission
- Principal: Mr. Ryan Williams
- Grades: 7-13
- Gender: Male and Female
- Colours: Blue and Gold
- Athletics: Track and Field
- Sports: Football, Cricket, Netball
- Nickname: STMC or Mary's
- Communities served: Parks Roads, Rock Hall, Harkers Hall, Cassava River, Glengoffe, Mt. Matthews

Saint Mary's College is a high school located in Above Rocks in Saint Catherine, Jamaica. It was founded in 1955 by its first principal, Father Edmund Cheney S.J. of St. Mary's Mission Catholic Church.

Currently, about 1000 students are enrolled.

Like other Jamaican secondary schools, Saint Mary's College uses a selection process to accept students starting at seventh grade. Students must pass the Grade Six Achievement Test (formerly known as the Common Entrance Examination), and the Grade Nine Achievement Test.

== Communities served ==
The school serves the communities of:

- Golden River
- Parks Roads
- Rock Hall
- Harkers Hall
- Cassava River
- Glengoffe
- Mt. Matthews
- Red Hills
- Zion Hill
- Cavaliers
- Red Ground
- Mannings Hill
- Stony Hill

Until 1966, the school accommodated boarders from other Caribbean countries and the U.S.

== Campus ==
The school has numerous facilities, such as an administrative block, a cafeteria, lunch room, library, computer lab, music room and science labs, as well as several classroom blocks and staff rooms, etc. The school also has spacious volleyball and basketball courts. The campus has teachers' residences, as well as apartment-style cottages for foreign or out-of-town teachers having the option to live on campus.

== Uniform ==
Uniforms are worn on campus. Girls in first through third form wear a sky blue double pleated tunic over a short-sleeved gold blouse. Boys wear khaki pants and shirts with blue and gold crest and striped epaulettes. Girls in fourth and fifth form wear a double pleated blue skirt with a gold blouse and a striped tie, while boys wear khaki pants and shirts with a blue and gold striped tie. Sixth form girls wear a short-sleeved gold jacket lined with blue piping over a blue A-lined skirt. Sixth form boys wear long-sleeved white shirts, khaki pants and a gold tie striped with blue. All students wear black shoes with navy blue socks. Prefects' uniforms are the same as other students', but they often feature a white short sleeved blouse or shirt instead of the gold blouse or khaki shirt.

== Curriculum ==
Subjects offered to students include Technical Drawing, Wood Works, Mathematics, Physical Education, General Science, Social Studies, Home Economics, Biology, Geography, History, Physics, Food and Nutrition, Clothing and Textiles, Principles of Accounting, Office Administration, Principles of Business, English, Chemistry, Information Technology, Electrical Principles, Literature, Spanish, Art and Religious Education.

Students take the Caribbean Secondary Education Certification (CSEC) Exam in their 4th or 5th year at the school and the Caribbean Advance Proficiency Exam (CAPE) in their 6th form years.

== Sports activities ==
Students participate in national school events for the following sports:

- Football
- Netball
- Track and Field
- Cricket

== Head Teachers/Principals ==
- Fr. Edmund K Cheaney S.J., 1955–1960
- Fr. John Meaney, 1960–1964
- Fr. Peter Burgess (SMA), 1964–1966
- Fr. Maurice Feres S.J., 1966–69
- Mr. Carlylse McKenzie, 1969–1974
- Mr. Audley Morgan, 1974–1977
- Mr. Patrick Donaldson, 1978–1989
- Rev. Micah Marrith, 1989–1996
- Mrs. Monica Green, 1996–2006
- Mrs. Ivy Clarke, 2005–2007
- Mrs. Serphena Davidson, 2007–date
- Mr. Ryan Williams
