= Most Blessed Sacrament Cathedral, Montego Bay =

Coordinates: 18.47817°N 77.92611°W

Most Blessed Sacrament Cathedral
- Most Blessed Sacrament Cathedral
- Location: Montego Bay
- Country: Jamaica
- Denomination: Roman Catholic Church

The Most Blessed Sacrament Cathedral is a religious building belonging to the Roman Catholic Church located in the city of Montego Bay in the northwest of the Caribbean island country of Jamaica. It is located on 3 Fort Street.

It is a temple that follows the Roman or Latin rite, being the seat of the Catholic Diocese of Montego Bay (Dioecesis Sinus Sereni).

Formerly a member of the Diocese of Kingston, it is now a suffragan of the Metropolitan Archdiocese of Kingston. The present building was built in 1967 with funds from the diocese. All Masses and religious services are offered in English.

== See also ==
- Catholic Church in Jamaica
- List of cathedrals in Jamaica
