= Edgerton Roland Clarke =

Jamaican Catholic bishop (1929–2025)

His Excellency Edgerton Roland Clarke
- Archbishop of Kingston in Jamaica
- Archdiocese: Kingston in Jamaica
- Appointed: 11 November 1994
- Term ended: 17 February 2004
- Predecessor: Samuel Emmanuel Carter
- Successor: Lawrence Aloysius Burke
- Previous post: Bishop of Montego Bay (1967–1994)

Orders
- Ordination: 2 February 1960
- Consecration: 30 November 1967 by Marie-Joseph Lemieux

Personal details
- Born: 14 February 1929 Cambridge, Jamaica
- Died: 13 February 2025 (aged 95) Kingston, Jamaica

Edgerton Roland Clarke (14 February 1929 – 13 February 2025) was a Jamaican Roman Catholic prelate who was the bishop of Montego Bay from 1967 to 1994 and archbishop of Kingston in Jamaica from 1994 to 2004. He died on 13 February 2025, at the age of 95.

Catholic Church titles
Preceded by Samuel Emmanuel Carter	Archbishop of Kingston in Jamaica; 1994–2004	Succeeded by Lawrence Aloysius Burke
Preceded by First	Bishop of Montego Bay; 1967–1994	Succeeded by Charles Dufour
