= Holy Trinity Cathedral (Kingston) =

Coordinates: 17.9754004°N 76.7848215°W

- Holy Trinity Cathedral
- Location: Kingston
- Country: Jamaica
- Denomination: Roman Catholic Church

Architecture
- Architect: Raymond F. Almirall
- Style: Neo-Byzantine
- Completed: 1911

Administration
- Archdiocese: Kingston in Jamaica

Holy Trinity Cathedral is a Catholic church located in downtown Kingston, the capital of Jamaica. It is located between North Street and George Headley Drive.

The church is the seat of the metropolitan Archbishop of Kington in Jamaica and was consecrated in 1911. Its Byzantine Revival design was conceived by American architect Raymond F. Almirall, at the bequest of bishop John J. Collins. Pope John Paul II paid a visit on 10 August 1993.

The cathedral was built after the destruction, in the earthquake of 1907, of the Church of the Holy Trinity in the Duke and Sutton streets. It is located on a site adjacent to Winchester Park, the works beginning in 1908.

The religious services for the state funerals of Prime Ministers Michael Manley and Edward Seaga were held at the Cathedral.

== See also ==
- Catholicism in Jamaica
