= Diocese of Montego Bay =

Latin Catholic ecclesiastical jurisdiction in Jamaica

Diocese of Montego Bay Dioecesis Sinus Sereni

Location
- Country: Jamaica
- Ecclesiastical province: Province of Kingston in Jamaica
- Metropolitan: Kenneth David Oswin Richards
- Coordinates: 18.4673°N 77.8956°W

Statistics
- Area: 3,878 km^{2} (1,497 sq mi)
- Population: Total; Catholics: (as of 2004); 822,100; 14,926 (1.8%)
- Parishes: 15

Information
- Denomination: Roman Catholic
- Rite: Latin Rite
- Established: 14 September 1967 (59 years ago)
- Cathedral: Blessed Sacrament Cathedral

Current leadership
- Pope: Leo XIV
- Bishop: Sede vacante
- Apostolic Administrator: John Derek Persaud

Map
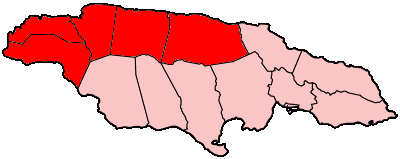

Website
- mobaydiocese.tripod.com

The Roman Catholic Diocese of Montego Bay (Latin: Dioecesis Sinus Sereni) is a Latin suffragan diocese of the Roman Catholic Church located on the northwest part of the island of Jamaica (Greater Antilles), in the Caribbean ecclesiastical province of the Metropolitan Archdiocese of Kingston (which covers all Jamaica, the Cayman Islands and Belize), yet depends on the missionary Roman Congregation for the Evangelization of Peoples.

Its episcopal see is the Most Blessed Sacrament Cathedral, in Montego Bay, Saint James (civil) parish. Pope Francis appointed Burchell Alexander McPherson of the Archdiocese of Kingston the third Bishop of Montego Bay on April 11, 2013. He was consecrated and installed at Blessed Sacrament Cathedral, Montego Bay on June 8, 2013.

This diocese is separate from the suffragan see of the same name, held by the Anglican Bishop of Montego Bay in the Anglican Diocese of Jamaica and the Cayman Islands.

== History ==
- Established 14 September 1967 by Pope Paul VI as Diocese of Montego Bay (Dioecesis Sinus Sereni), on territory split off from Diocese of Kingston), as its suffragan.
- Lost territory on 1991.04.15 to establish the then Apostolic Vicariate of Mandeville, now also a suffragan of Kingston.

== Episcopal ordinaries ==
(all Latin Rite, so far native)

- Edgerton Roland Clarke (1967.09.14 – 1994.11.11), next Metropolitan Archbishop of Kingston in Jamaica (Jamaica) (1994.11.11 – retired 2004.02.17), President of Antilles Episcopal Conference (1997 – 2003) - Pope Paul VI selected Edgerton Roland Clarke as the first bishop of Montego Bay. Clarke was born in 1929 and was consecrated a bishop upon the inauguration of the diocese of Montego Bay.
- Charles Henry Dufour (6 December 1995 – 11 April 2013), also Apostolic Administrator of Mandeville (Jamaica) (2006.08.08 – 2008.05.20); later Metropolitan Archbishop of Kingston (Jamaica) (2011.04.15 – resigned 2016.04.29), again Apostolic Administrator of above Mandeville (2016.04.29 – ...) - Pope John Paul II elected Charles H. Dufour who was born in Kingston on April 15, 1940. He was ordained a priest in August 1970, and then went on to be appointed bishop and consecrated on Feb. 10, 1996 at the Blessed Sacrament Cathedral in Montego Bay.
- Burchell Alexander McPherson (11 April 2013 – 16 October 2023), no previous prelature.
  - John Derek Persaud, Apostolic Administrator (since 16 October 2023)

== Statistics and extent ==
As per 2014, it pastorally served 10,000 Catholics (1.5% of 647,600 total) on 3,878 km^{2} in 10 parishes and 22 missions with 12 priests (9 diocesan, 3 religious), 12 deacons, 16 lay religious (6 brothers, 10 sisters) and 1 seminarian.

The diocese of Montego Bay is made up of five administrative parishes: St. James, Trelawny, St. Ann, Westmoreland and Hanover.

Of the three Roman Catholic dioceses in Jamaica, the diocese of Montego Bay is the largest in land area spanning 1,500 sq. miles.

=== Parishes ===
Not every parish in the Montego Bay Diocese is able to have a full-time priest available. Many parishes rely on missionary priests to aid in the celebration of Mass and the sacraments. The list of parishes includes the name of the full-time pastor if available.

- Blessed Sacrament Cathedral: located in Montego Bay, Blessed Sacrament Cathedral is the seat of the bishop. It was built in 1967 with the founding of the diocese. The rector is the Very Rev. Msgr. Eremodo Muavesi
- Our Lady of Fatima: located in Ocho Rios.
- Mary, Gate of Heaven: located in Negril. Pastor is Rev. Fr. James Bok
- Sts. Philip and James: located in Lucea.
- St. Joseph, the Worker: located in Falmouth. - Rev James Saturday
- St. Ignatius: located in Brown's Town. Rev Peter
- Holy Name: located in Bamboo. Pastor is Rev. philip Mckenzie .
- St. Boniface: located in Alva.
- Our Lady of Perpetual Help: located in St. Ann's Bay.Rev Gerard Reid
- Sacred Heart: located in Reading. Pastor is Fr. Marek Kolbuch
- Sacred Heart: located in Seaford Town. Rev Morris
- St. Joseph: located in Savanna-la-mar.
- St. Mark: located in Grange Hill.

== See also ==
- List of Catholic dioceses in Jamaica

== Sources and external links ==
- GCatholic - data for most sections
- "Diocese of Montego Bay". Catholic-Hierarchy.
