= Grade Six Achievement Test =

High school entrance test in Jamaica

Grade Six Achievement Test (GSAT) was Jamaica's national high school entrance test. It is usually taken in March. with the results are usually released in June. The GSAT replaced the UK's Common Entrance Examination in 1999. Many critics have long argued for a more analytical approach to standard exams in the country, as the exam is one that is highly focused on the recall or recognition of facts. In the central part of the country, schools such as Manchester High School can expect to receive the best performing students from the annual GSAT exams, while in the west Cornwall College is the perpetrator, with Campion College in the east being the overall preferred institution of choice for all Jamaicans irrespective of geographic boundaries.

There are five subjects, namely English (including comprehension), social studies, science, mathematics, and communication task. All subjects but communication task, science and social studies (which has 60 questions) have 80 questions.

Much pressure is put on the students and several extra classes are done. Academic year 2017-2018 was the last year for the examination and the Ministry of Education is replacing it with PEP - Primary Exit Programme.
