= Charles Dufour =

The Most Reverend Charles Dufour D.D., C.D.
- Archbishop of Kingston
- See: Roman Catholic Archdiocese of Kingston in Jamaica
- Appointed: 15 April 2011
- Installed: 16 June 2011
- Term ended: 29 April 2016
- Predecessor: Donald James Reece
- Successor: Kenneth Richards
- Other post: Bishop of Montego Bay

Orders
- Ordination: 12 August 1970
- Consecration: 10 February 1996 by Edgerton Roland Clarke

Personal details
- Born: Charles Henry Dufour, Jr. April 25, 1940 (age 86) Kingston, Jamaica
- Denomination: Roman Catholic
- Motto: Sent to serve
- Coat of arms

Styles of Charles Dufour
- Reference style: The Most Reverend
- Spoken style: Your Excellency
- Religious style: Archbishop

Charles Henry Dufour, Jr, CD (born 25 April 1940) is Archbishop emeritus of the Catholic Archdiocese of Kingston in Jamaica, having served from 2011 to 2016.

== Life until Priesthood ==
Dufour was born in Kingston, Jamaica, to Charles Sr and Mavis; he grew up in Rollington Town, Greater Kingston, and received primary education at Holy Rosary Preparatory before advancing to St Mary's College in Above Rocks, St Catherine. His studies for the Priesthood took place at the then-Seminary of St Michael, Kingston, as well as in England at the now-closed St Joseph's College, Upholland, Lancashire.

== Priesthood ==
He was ordained on 12 August 1970 and appointed Parochial Vicar in such circumstances that he served the Churches of the Holy Rosary (Windward Town) and St Joseph (Spanish Town). He moved to the Churches of St Benedict (Harbour View), the African Martyrs of Uganda (Bull Bay) and Christ the King (Port Royal) in 1972 where he served for some ten years as Pastor of the respective parish(es). Then, for another ten years after this, he was made Rector of the Seminary, the first such who could call it his alma mater. He was also, for some time between 1982 and 1996, Pastor of Christ the King Church in August Town.

His express focus in these roles was youth, the poor and the marginalised, as seen (for the former) in having been the founding Chairman of Harbour View's public secondary school, Donald Quarrie High.

On 18 December 1983, Dufour was awarded the Jamaican Prime Minister's Medal of Appreciation; on 18 April 1991 he was appointed an Honorary Prelate of His Holiness and in 1993 he was Chairman of the Organising Committee for Pope John Paul II's visit to the island (9 – 11 August).

== Episcopacy ==
=== Diocese of Montego Bay ===
On 6 December 1995, it was announced that Dufour was elected by John Paul to be the second Bishop of Montego Bay, after His Holiness had promoted Edgerton Roland Clarke as Archbishop of Kingston the previous year. He was ordained by Clarke on 10 February, with the latter's immediate predecessor Archbishop Samuel Carter, SJ, and Bishop Paul Michael Boyle, CP, then Vicar Apostolic of Mandeville, as the principal co-consecrators.

His social engagement over the next fifteen years would include:

- the Peace Management Initiative, of which he was the first chairman (March 2003 – February 2008)
- the Parliamentary Salaries Commission
- the Police (Civilian Oversight) Authority (PCOA), of which he was appointed Chairman in 2008 by Governor-General Sir Kenneth O. Hall
- the Good Shepherd Foundation, of his own establishment and patronage

On a visit to Ghana in July 1997 Bishop Dufour ordained several Priests and met Opoku Ware II, then leader of the Ashanti peoples, who kissed the Bishop's hand in welcome and out of respect.

In 2006 Dufour was honoured by his country as a Commander of the Order of Distinction. On 8 August of the same year he was appointed Apostolic Administrator of Mandeville by Pope Benedict XVI, because His Holiness had on that day accepted the early resignation of Bishop Gordon Bennett, SJ. Dufour remained in this role until this ceased two days short of two years in, when Neil Tiedemann, CP, took possession of his appointed Diocese during his Ordination as Bishop.

=== Archdiocese of Kingston in Jamaica ===
On 15 April 2011 it was announced that Dufour was himself promoted, by Benedict, as the sixth Archbishop of Kingston in Jamaica, after His Holiness had accepted the resignation of Donald Reece (which was announced in the same release). The Archbishop-designate took possession of his appointed Archdiocese during his installation on 16 June.

In this way as well his social engagement continued, at least with reference to the PCOA and up to 2012, since he continued as its Chairman by re-appointment from Governor-General Sir Patrick Allen.

=== Resignation ===
On 29 April 2016, four days after a year passed since Dufour turned 75 and submitted his resignation, it was announced that Pope Francis accepted it and promoted Bishop Kenneth Richards of St John's–Basseterre as the seventh Archbishop of Kingston in Jamaica.

Now, until Archbishop-designate Richards takes possession of his appointed Archdiocese on 6 July, Dufour is automatically its Diocesan Administrator. But it was also announced that Francis appointed Bishop Tiedemann an Auxiliary of Brooklyn. Thus, with Mandeville vacant, once more Dufour was appointed its Apostolic Administrator.

He has written of being the “Administrator-Elect” and of being “installed” in that Diocese on 7 July, which suggests change in its jurisdiction, but it may simply reflect the fact that his first time in this role ad hoc was lengthy. At any rate, Dufour remains the only Bishop who has ever been named personally to all three Dioceses in Jamaica in an official capacity.

== Personal life ==
Though he has received such dignitaries as the Canadian Prime Minister (Jean Chrétien), the Cuban President (Fidel Castro) and the Spanish Crown (Juan Carlos and Sofía), Dufour has continued working with youth and those in prison. The latter is evident in having ministered at Fort Augusta, Tower Street (formerly known as the General Penitentiary) and South Camp. In fact he has sat on the Board of Visitors for the two latter institutions. He has also been Vice-President of the National Committee for Justice and Peace and Unity.

Dufour has also remained active for having been so active: he enjoys mountaineering and has practised several times on the Blue Mountain Peak. Furthermore, at least up to 2012, he has been keeping fit with regular visits to the gym.

Finally, as when a day is over, Dufour relaxes to (classical) music; it is presumably with that genre that he was somewhat familiar in high school. He enjoys Beethoven, taking inspiration from the fact that “when he became deaf in his (twenties), he refused to give up and wrote some beautiful pieces”. But he has also been a fan of Bob Marley for years and owns “a collection of his work”, of which his favourite is Redemption Song because, in his own words, "it encourages us to rid our minds of mental slavery." He sums up this side of him thus: "I like music of all types – Greek, Russian, American, African drumming and others."

== Coat-of-Arms ==
Coat of arms of Charles Dufour
Notes On a field of blue, signifying the Virgin Mary, a Chi Rho is centrally placed, just as Christ is the centre of a Bishop's life as teacher and servant of the People of God. Clouds are found in chief, with three lines radiating above them, to recall the voice of God the Father whose favour rested on his Son and his Son's mission; this being expressed in the motto: Sent to serve (cf. Mark 10: 45). To the left of the Christogram is a jug of water pouring into a basin, to symbolise cleansing in a typical Jamaican way, and to the right is a pair of cupped hands, being “at once clasped in prayer and open for service”. The Trinity is completed with the dove hovering over the Christogram, the Holy Spirit which must inspire wisdom and love in those whom Christ calls to serve as Priests, like the armiger. Finally, flames make for canting arms as the surname “Dufour” means of the furnace in the language of the armiger's father, French. But the flames are also indicative of the fervour and zeal with which he ministers.
