= Neil Edward Tiedemann =

American Roman Catholic prelate and bishop

His Excellency, The Most Reverend Neil Edward Tiedemann C.P.
- Auxiliary Bishop Emeritus of Brooklyn; Titular Bishop of Cova
- Church: Roman Catholic Church
- Archdiocese: New York
- Diocese: Brooklyn
- Appointed: April 29, 2016
- Installed: August 4, 2016
- Retired: June 30, 2023
- Other post: Titular Bishop of Cova
- Previous post: Bishop of Mandeville (2008-2016)

Orders
- Ordination: May 16, 1975 by Francis John Mugavero
- Consecration: August 6, 2008 by Donald James Reece, Charles Dufour, and Thomas Vose Daily

Personal details
- Born: March 5, 1948 (age 78) Brooklyn, New York, United States
- Motto: By His wounds we are healed
Styles of Neil Edward Tiedemann
- Reference style: His Excellency; The Most Reverend
- Spoken style: Your Excellency
- Religious style: Bishop

Neil Edward Tiedemann C.P. (born March 5, 1948) is an American prelate of the Roman Catholic Church who served as an auxiliary bishop for the Diocese of Brooklyn from 2016 to 2023 and as bishop of the Diocese of Mandeville in Jamaica from 2008 to 2016.

== Biography ==
=== Early life ===
Neil Tiedemann was born on March 5, 1948, in Brooklyn, New York, but was raised on Long Island. He graduated from Holy Cross Seminary, a minor seminary operated by the Congregation of the Passion in Dunkirk, New York. Tiedemann then attended Holy Family Seminary in West Hartford Connecticut. He graduated from LaSalle University in Philadelphia in 1970 with a Bachelor of Sociology degree. Tiedemann professed to the Congregation of the Passion on August 22, 1971, and made his final vows to them on August 22, 1974.

=== Priesthood ===
On May 16, 1975, Tiedemann was ordained to the priesthood for the Passionists by Bishop Francis John Mugavero in Brooklyn. That same year, Tiedemann received a Master of Theology degree and a Master of Divinity degree from St. John’s University in New York City.

The Passionists first assigned Tiedemann as parochial vicar at Immaculate Conception Parish in Queens, New York. During this period, he also worked for Catholic Charities. In 1982, Tiedemann left Immaculate Conception to work at St. Joseph Parish in Union City, New Jersey, and Blessed Sacrament in Springfield, Massachusetts. The Passionists then sent him to Tegucigalpa, Honduras, where he helped found Casa Pasionista, an HIV/AIDS hospice.

=== Bishop of Mandeville ===
On May 2, 2008, Pope Benedict XVI appointed Tiedemann as bishop of Mandeville. He was consecrated by Archbishop Donald Reece at Saint Paul of the Cross Cathedral in Mandeville, Jamaica on August 6, 2008.

=== Auxiliary Bishop of Brooklyn ===
Pope Francis appointed Tiedemann as an auxiliary bishop of Brooklyn on April 29, 2016; he was installed on August 4, 2016. As auxiliary bishop, he was assigned as pastor of St. Matthias Parish in Queens. He also served as the vicar for West Indian, Caribbean, and African-American Catholics

=== Retirement ===
Tiedemann submitted his resignation to Pope Francis after reaching his 75th birthday. The pope accepted it on June 30, 2023.

== See also ==
- Catholic Church hierarchy
- Catholic Church in the United States
- Historical list of the Catholic bishops of the United States
- List of Catholic bishops of the United States
- Lists of patriarchs, archbishops, and bishops

== Episcopal succession ==
Catholic Church titles
Preceded by –	Auxiliary Bishop of Brooklyn; 2016–2023	Succeeded by -
Preceded by Gordon Bennett	Bishop of Mandeville; 2008–2016	Succeeded by John Derek Persaud
