= Bull Bay =

Bay in Jamaica

Coordinates: 17°57′N 76°40′W

Bull Bay is an area located on the southeast coast of Jamaica, 10 miles (16 km) to the east of Kingston on the border between St Andrew and St Thomas, beside Cow Bay. According to folklore, both bays were so named because cattle once roamed the whole area and were slaughtered to provide food for buccaneers and English colonists. Industry in the area includes quarrying for gypsum.

== Floods ==
As a result of being located in the floodplains of five rivers (the Salt Spring River, Chalky River, Bull Park River, Spring Gut River and the Cane River), Bull Bay has been the subject of several floods. The land is low-lying, with an approximate maximum elevation of 150 feet (46 m) above sea level. The drainage basin is composed of relatively hard and impervious rock structures.

The floods in September 2002 followed heavy rainfall that month (3,500 millimetres; 140 in), due to Hurricane Lili. One person died. Local residents described the flood as being the most disastrous since Hurricane Gilbert in September 1988. A contributing factor to the flooding was identified by residents as silt. Some of this comes from local quarries, particularly belonging to Jamaica Gypsum & Quarries Ltd., but local deforestation by residents seeking firewood was also a contributing factor. The dumping of garbage was another factor.

The Ten Miles and Eleven Miles areas of Bull Bay are regularly subject to floods. Residents have lost livestock, personal belongings, cars, and houses. They also complained of increased problems with insects and pests, bad roads, and resultant health problems.

== Local industries ==
- Jamaica Gypsum & Quarries Ltd.
- Walker's Blocks and Quarry

== Culture and entertainment ==
Bull Bay is home to a Rastafari community of Bobo Ashanti known as Bobo Hill. The area also contains several nightclubs.

- Sun Coast Adventure Park – Jamaica's first and largest paintball facility
- Bob Marley Beach
- Cane River Falls – Bob Marley's favourite place to wash his dreadlocks
