= Mavis Bank =

- Town
- Location within Jamaica
- Coordinates: 18.0314032°N 76.6583705°W
- Country: Jamaica
- Parish: St Andrew
- Parliamentary Constituency: East Rural Saint Andrew

Population
  - Estimate (2009): 1,787

Mavis Bank is a rural coffee farming community approximately 10 miles (16 km) north east of Kingston, Jamaica in east rural St. Andrew in the Blue Mountains, close to the border of Portland.

The town takes its name from a surrounding coffee (named after Mavisbank House an historic house in Scotland) which has been owned by the Munn family for many years, and is the main employer in the area. One of the coffees produced by the estate is Jamaican Blue Mountain Coffee.

Close to the west south west is a summit of the same name on which stands a tertiary triangulation station (18.027118°N 76.662512°W).
