= Diocese of Mandeville =

Latin Catholic ecclesiastical jurisdiction in Jamaica

Diocese of Mandeville Dioecesis Mandevillensis

Location
- Country: Jamaica
- Territory: Manchester; Clarendon; St. Elizabeth
- Ecclesiastical province: Kingston in Jamaica
- Coordinates: 18.0371°N 77.5140°W

Statistics
- Area: 3,282 km^{2} (1,267 sq mi)
- Population: Total; Catholics: (as of 2014); 586,200; 5,925 (1.0%)
- Parishes: 20
- Churches: 17 (and 8 missions)
- Schools: 18

Information
- Denomination: Roman Catholic
- Rite: Latin Rite
- Established: 15 April 1991 (35 years ago)
- Cathedral: St. Paul of the Cross Cathedral
- Patron saint: Our Lady of Holy Hope
- Secular priests: 17/18

Current leadership
- Pope: Leo XIV
- Bishop: John Derek Persaud
- Metropolitan Archbishop: Kenneth Richards
- Bishops emeritus: Gordon Bennett, SJ

Map
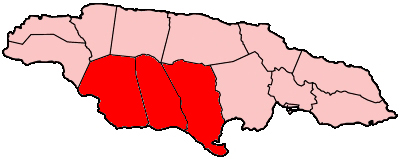

Website
- mandevillediocese.org

The Roman Catholic Diocese of Mandeville is a Latin suffragan bishopric in the ecclesiastical province of the Metropolitan Archdiocese of Kingston in Jamaica, yet depends on the missionary Roman Congregation for the Evangelization of Peoples.

Its cathedral episcopal see is the St. Paul of the Cross Pro-Cathedral, in Mandeville, Jamaica, administrative (civil) Manchester Parish, in west-central Jamaica along the southern coast.

The current bishop is John Derek Persaud, who was appointed on June 19, 2020.

== History ==
Erected on 15 April 1991, as the Apostolic Vicariate of Mandeville, on territories split off from Metropolitan Archdiocese of Kingston in Jamaica and Diocese of Montego Bay.

It was elevated on 21 November 1997 as Diocese of Mandeville.

== Statistics ==
As per 2014, it pastorally served 5,925 Catholics (1.0% of 586,200 total) on 3,282 km² in 20 parishes with 19 priests (17 diocesan, 2 religious), 6 deacons and 29 lay religious (6 brothers, 23 sisters).

== Episcopal ordinaries ==
(all Roman Rite; so far missionary members of a Latin congregation)

Apostolic Vicar of Mandeville

- Paul Michael Boyle, Passionists (C.P.) (born USA) (1991.04.15 – 1997.11.21 see below), Titular Bishop of Canapium (1991.04.15 – 1997.11.21), initially as Superior General of the Congregation of the Passion (Passionists, C.P.) (1976 – 1988)

Suffragan Bishops of Mandeville

- Paul Michael Boyle, C.P. (see above 1997.11.21 – retired 2004.07.06), died 2008
- Gordon Dunlap Bennett, Jesuits (S.J.) (born USA) (2004.07.06 – retired 2006.08.08); previously Titular Bishop of Nesqually (1997.12.23 – 2004.07.06) as Auxiliary Bishop of Baltimore (USA) (1997.12.23 – 2004.07.06)
- Apostolic Administrator Charles Henry Dufour (2006.08.08 – 2008.05.20 see below); while Bishop of Montego Bay (Jamaica) (1995.12.06 – 2011.04.15)
- Neil Edward Tiedemann, C.P. (born USA) (2008 – 2016); appointed Auxiliary Bishop of Brooklyn
- Apostolic Administrator (again) Charles Henry Dufour (see above 2016.04.29 – 2020.09.19), when just retired as Metropolitan Archbishop of Kingston in Jamaica (Jamaica) (2011.04.15 – 2016.04.29).
- John Derek Persaud (2020.06.19 – ...)

== See also ==
- List of Catholic dioceses in Jamaica

== Sources and external links ==
- GCatholic, with Google satellite photo - data for all setyions
- Catholic-hierarchy.org - Mandeville
