= Above Rocks =

- Town
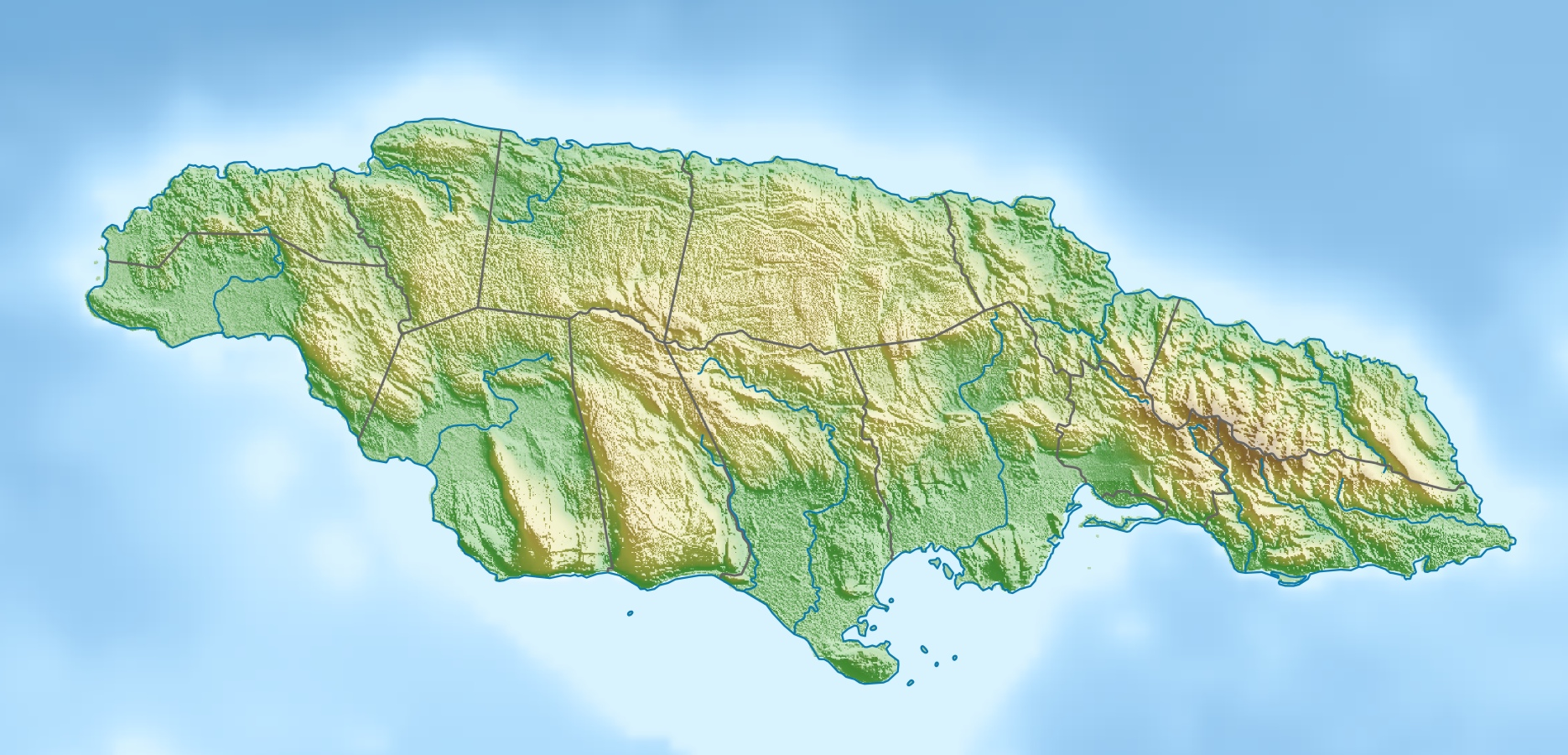
- Location in Jamaica
- Coordinates: 18°06′32″N 76°52′38″W
- Country: Jamaica
- Parish: Saint Catherine
- Elevation: 269 m (882 ft)

Population (1991)
  - Total: 3,263
  - Estimate (2010): 5,261
- Time zone: UTC-05:00 (EST)

Above Rocks is a town in the parish of Saint Catherine in Jamaica.

Above Rocks was populated in the early 19th century by (Roman Catholic) refugees from the Haitian Revolution. St Mary's College, a Catholic secondary school, can be found in the town of Above Rocks.
