= Kenneth Richards (bishop) =

Jamaican Catholic prelate (born 1958)

The Most Reverend and The Honourable Kenneth Richards DD CD
- Archbishop of Kingston in Jamaica
- Archdiocese: Kingston in Jamaica
- See: Kingston in Jamaica
- Appointed: April 29, 2016
- Installed: July 6, 2016
- Predecessor: Charles Dufour
- Previous post: Bishop of Saint John's–Basseterre (2011-2016)

Orders
- Ordination: September 29, 1985
- Consecration: February 8, 2012 by Donald James Reece

Personal details
- Born: Kenneth David Oswin Richards; August 16, 1958 (age 68) Linstead, St. Catherine, Jamaica
- Education: University of the West Indies (BA); Catholic University of America (STL)
- Motto: Called to be Holy
- Coat of arms

Ordination history
History
Diaconal ordination
- Date: September 28, 1984
Priestly ordination
- Date: September 29, 1985
Episcopal consecration
- Principal consecrator: Donald James Reece
- Co-consecrators: Robert Rivas; Gabriel Malzaire
- Date: February 8, 2011
- Place: Holy Family Cathedral, St John’s, Antigua
Episcopal succession
Bishops consecrated by Kenneth Richards as principal consecrator
- John Derek Persaud: September 19, 2020

Styles of Kenneth Richards
- Reference style: Your Grace; The Most Reverend
- Spoken style: Your Grace
- Religious style: Archbishop

Kenneth David Oswin Richards (born August 16, 1958) is a Jamaican prelate of the Catholic Church who has served as Archbishop of Kingston in Jamaica since 2016.

== Early life ==
Kenneth David Oswin Richards, was born in Linstead, St Catherine, Jamaica. He is the oldest of seven children. When he was about 10 years old, he was converted to Catholicism.

== Education ==
Having completed his studies at St. Michael's Seminary in Kingston, he was ordained in 1985. He first served as Associate Pastor at Holy Cross Church in Half-Way-Tree, then as Pastor of St Benedict's Church, Harbour View, and later as Pastor of St. Patrick's Church, Waterhouse; St. Jude, Newark Avenue & Christ the Redeemer, Seaview Gardens. In 2006, he earned a Licentiate of Sacred Theology from the Catholic University of America in Washington D.C. He was appointed Archdiocesan Director of Vocations, before becoming Rector of The Cathedral of the Most Holy Trinity where he managed its restoration in time for its 100th anniversary in 2011.

== Career ==
In 2009, Father Richards was conferred with the title of Monsignor, and in December 2011, Pope Benedict XVI appointed him as Bishop of St John's-Basseterre with pastoral responsibility for Antigua & Barbuda, St Kitts & Nevis and the three British dependent territories of Anguilla, Montserrat and the British Virgin Islands – a post which he held until his appointment as Archbishop of Kingston in 2016.
