= Donald James Reece =

Jamaican prelate of the Catholic Church

The Most Reverend and Honourable Donald James Reece OJ CD GCM
- Archbishop of Kingston in Jamaica
- Church: Catholic Church
- Archdiocese: Kingston
- See: Kingston in Jamaica
- Installed: 12 April 2008
- Term ended: 15 April 2011
- Predecessor: Lawrence Aloysius Burke
- Successor: Charles Henry Dufour
- Previous post: Bishop of Saint John's–Basseterre (1981–2007)

Orders
- Ordination: 3 January 1971
- Consecration: 8 October 1981 by Samuel Emmanuel Carter, SJ

Personal details
- Born: 13 April 1934 (age 92) Kingston, Colony of Jamaica
- Coat of arms: Donald James Reece's coat of arms

Styles of Donald James Reece
- Reference style: The Most Reverend and Honourable
- Spoken style: Your Grace
- Religious style: Archbishop

Donald James Reece (born 13 April 1934) is a Jamaican prelate of the Catholic Church who served as Archbishop of Kingston in Jamaica from 2008 until his retirement in 2011.

== Biography ==
Donald James Reece began religious life as a Franciscan Friar in the Society of the Atonement in the 1950s before beginning studies at the Catholic University of America in preparation for the priesthood. He received on 3 January 1971 his priestly ordination and Pope John Paul II appointed him on 17 July 1981 bishop to the Roman Catholic Diocese of Saint John's–Basseterre. His consecration was given by Samuel Emmanuel Carter, SJ, Archbishop of Kingston, Kelvin Edward Felix, Archbishop of the Roman Catholic Archdiocese of Castries and Joseph Oliver Bowers, SVD, former bishop of the Diocese of Saint John's-Basseterre on 8 October of the same year.

On 12 October 2007 he was appointed by Pope Benedict XVI Coadjutor Archbishop of Kingston in Jamaica. After the retirement of Lawrence Aloysius Burke, SJ, he followed him on 12 April 2008 by the Office of the Archbishop of Kingston in Jamaica.

On 15 April 2011 Benedict XVI accepted his resignation as Archbishop of Kingston.

In 2012, he was honored for his contributions to education and religion with the Order of Jamaica, the fourth highest medal of Jamaica.
