= Archdiocese of Kingston in Jamaica =

Latin Catholic ecclesiastical jurisdiction in Jamaica

Archdiocese of Kingston in Jamaica Archidioecesis Regiopolitana in Iamaica

Location
- Country: Jamaica
- Ecclesiastical province: Province of Kingston in Jamaica
- Coordinates: 18.0889°N 77.2821°W

Statistics
- Area: 3,267 km^{2} (1,261 sq mi)
- Population: Total; Catholics: (as of 2013); 1,460,000; 58,400 (4%)
- Parishes: 31
- Schools: Campion College, St. George's College, Alpha Academy, St. Catherine High, St. Mary's College, Immaculate Conception High, Marymount High, Holy Childhood High, Holy Trinity High School

Information
- Denomination: Catholic
- Sui iuris church: Latin Church
- Rite: Roman Rite
- Established: 10 January 1837 (189 years ago)
- Cathedral: Holy Trinity Cathedral

Current leadership
- Pope: Leo XIV
- Archbishop: Kenneth Richards
- Bishops emeritus: Charles Dufour; Donald James Reece

Map
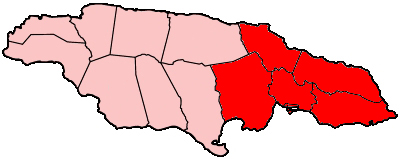

Website
- kingstonarchdiocese.org

The Archdiocese of Kingston in Jamaica (Latin: Archidioecesis Regiopolitana in Iamaica) is an archdiocese of the Roman Rite within the Catholic Church. Its area is the majority of Jamaica, including its capital, Kingston. the ecclesiastical province has three suffragan dioceses: Belize City-Belmopan, Mandeville and Montego Bay, as well as the Mission sui iuris of the Cayman Islands. They and the archdiocese are members of the Antilles Episcopal Conference.

== History ==
The archdiocese was originally called the Vicariate Apostolic of Jamaica when it was erected in 1837. In 1956, it became Diocese of Kingston and included all of Jamaica. In September 1967, two suffragans were split from the diocese and the diocese was elevated to an archdiocese.

As of 2006, the diocese contains 32 parishes, 30 active diocesan priests, 27 religious priests, and 56,200 Catholics. It also has 174 religious brothers, 113 religious sisters, and 19 permanent deacons. Donald James Reece was the Archbishop between 12 April 2008 and 15 April 2011. He was succeeded by Charles Henry Dufour, former bishop of the Diocese of Montego Bay, who was appointed 15 April 2011.

== Bishops ==
=== Ordinaries ===
1. Benito Fernández, O.F.M. (1837–1855)
2. James Eustace Dupeyron, S.J. (1855–1872)
3. Joseph Sidney Woollett, S.J. (1871–1877)
4. Thomas Porter, S.J. (1877–1888)
5. Charles Gordon, S.J. (1889–1906)
6. John J. Collins, S.J. (1907–1918)
7. William F. O'Hare, S.J. (1919–1926)
8. Joseph N. Dinand, S.J. (1927–1930)
9. Thomas Addis Emmet, S.J. (1930–1949)
10. John J. McEleney, S.J. (1950–1970)
11. Samuel Carter, S.J. (1970–1994)
12. Edgerton Clarke (1994–2004)
13. Lawrence Aloysius Burke, S.J. (2004–2008)
14. Donald James Reece (2008–2011)
15. Charles Dufour (2011–2016)
16. Kenneth Richards (2017–present)

=== Coadjutor bishop ===
- James Eustace Dupeyron, S.J. (1851–1875), as Coadjutor Vicar Apostolic
- Donald James Reece (2007–2008)

=== Auxiliary bishop ===
- Samuel Carter, S.J. (1967–1970), appointed Archbishop here

=== Another priest of this diocese who became bishop ===
- Burchell Alexander McPherson, appointed Bishop of Montego Bay, Jamaica in 2013
