= List of cathedrals in Barbados =

This is the list of cathedrals in Barbados sorted by denomination.

== Anglican ==
- St. Michael's Cathedral, Bridgetown (Church in the Province of the West Indies)

== Catholic ==
Cathedrals of the Catholic Church in Barbados:

- St. Patrick's Cathedral, Bridgetown

== See also ==
- List of cathedrals
