= St. Paul's Conversion Church, Saba =

Coordinates: 17°37′46″N 63°13′54″W

St. Paul's Conversion Church
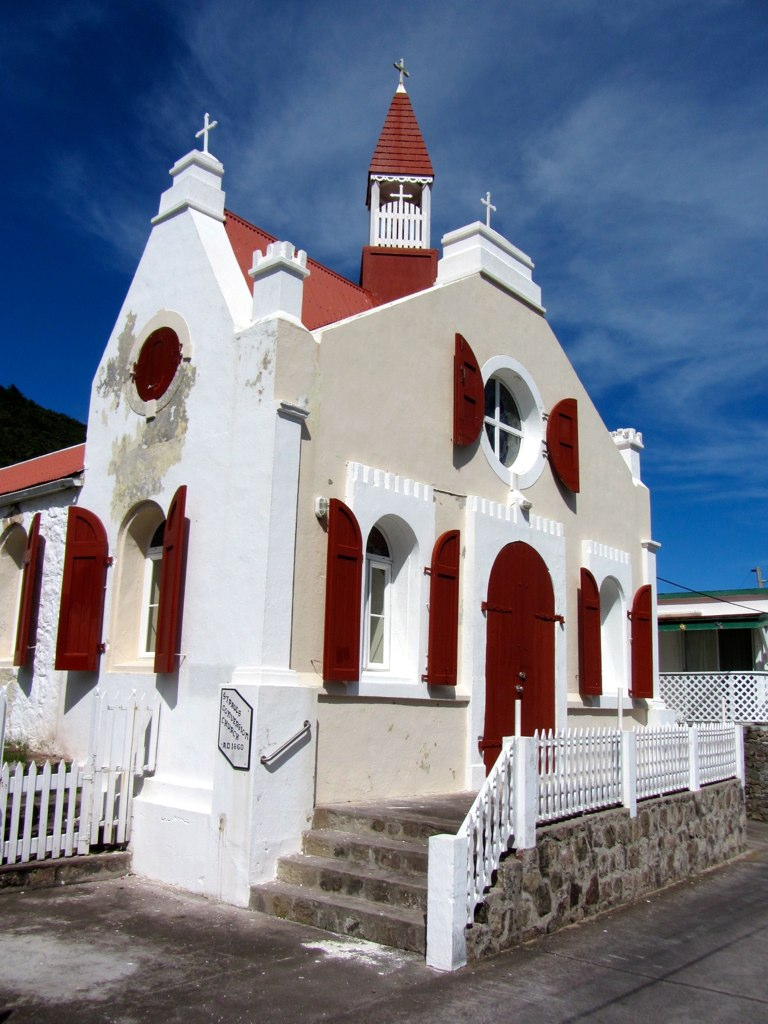
- St. Paul's Conversion Church
- Location: Windwardside, Saba
- Country: Netherlands
- Denomination: Roman Catholic Church

History
- Status: Parish Church
- Founder: Father Manuel Romero
- Dedication: Conversion of Paul the Apostle

Architecture
- Groundbreaking: 1859
- Completed: 1860

Administration
- Archdiocese: Archdiocese of Port of Spain
- Diocese: Diocese of Willemstad

The St. Paul's Conversion Church is a religious building belonging to the Catholic Church located in the town of Windwardside on the Caribbean island of Saba, a dependent territory with the status of special municipality of the Kingdom of the Netherlands. It was the first of the three Catholic churches constructed on the island, before with Sacred Heart Church and Holy Rosary Church, being completed in 1860.

== History ==
In May 1836, Msgr. Martinus Niewindt, an apostolic prefect from Curaçao arrived on Saba with Venezuelan priest Fr. Manuel Romero. Romero had moved to Curaçao as a political refugee. As neither of the two spoke English, they were helped by a resident from Guadeloupe who spoke French to communicate. Fr. Romero conducted his first mass on the island on 1 June 1836. On this day, the first baptism also took place, a child named Simon Peter.

The church was then constructed of stone between 1859 and 1860 under the supervision of Fr. Manuel Romero, making it the oldest Catholic church on the island. Since then, a further two Catholic Churches were constructed on the island.

== Diocese ==
The church sits in the Diocese of Willemstad, which was created by Pope Pius XII on 28 April 1958, from what was previously the Apostolic Vicariate of Curaçao. The diocese covers all six of the islands of the Dutch Caribbean. The current bishop is Bishop Luis Secco. The diocese falls under the Archdiocese of Port of Spain, with the current Archbishop being Charles Jason Gordon

== Gallery ==
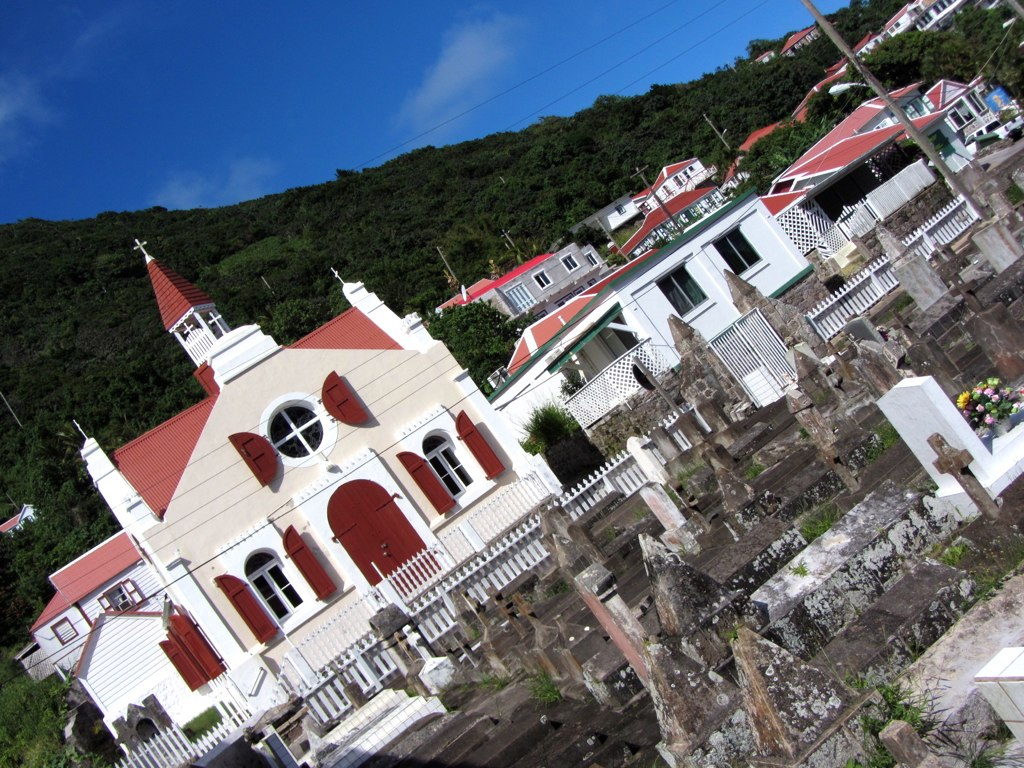

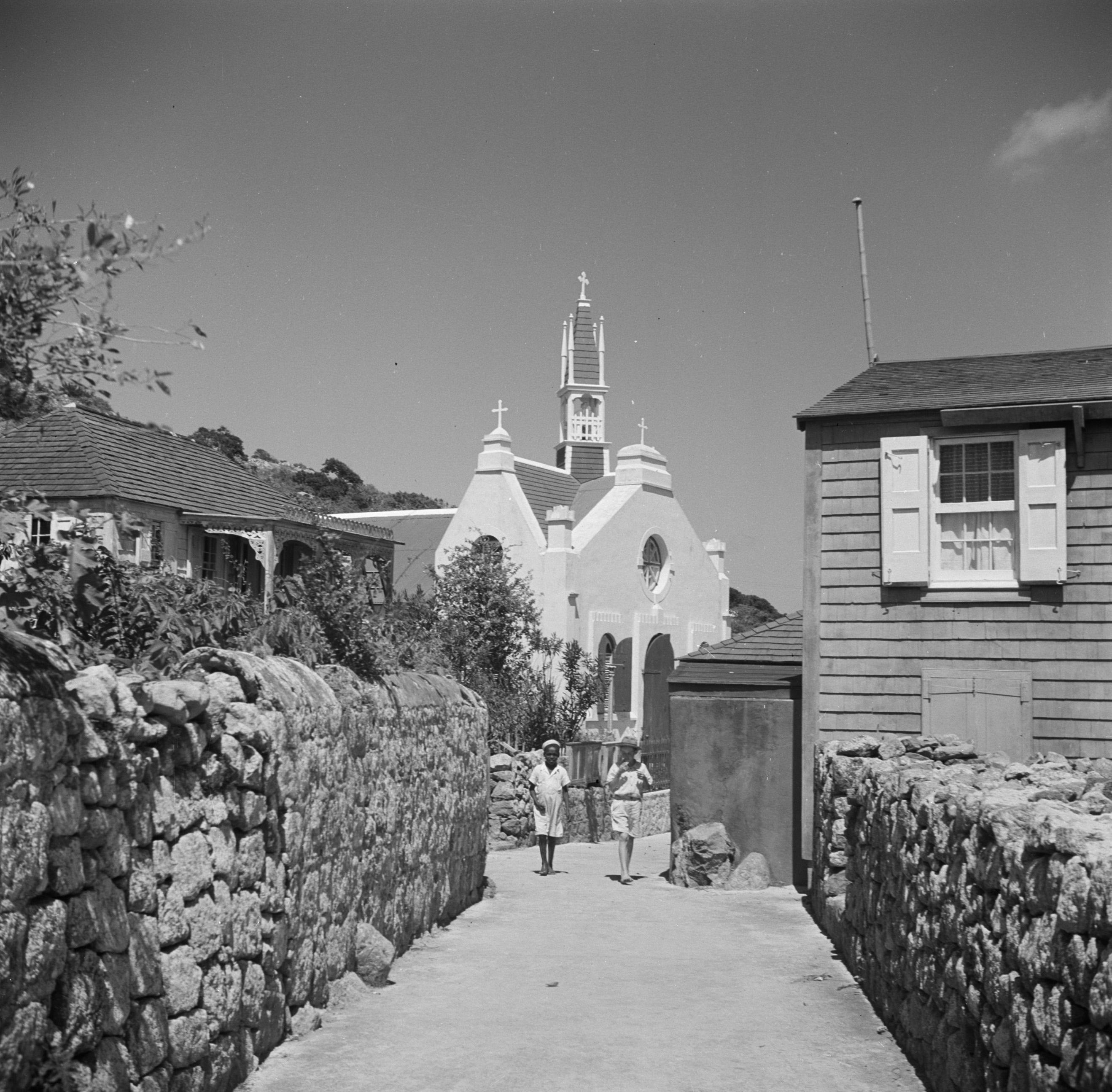

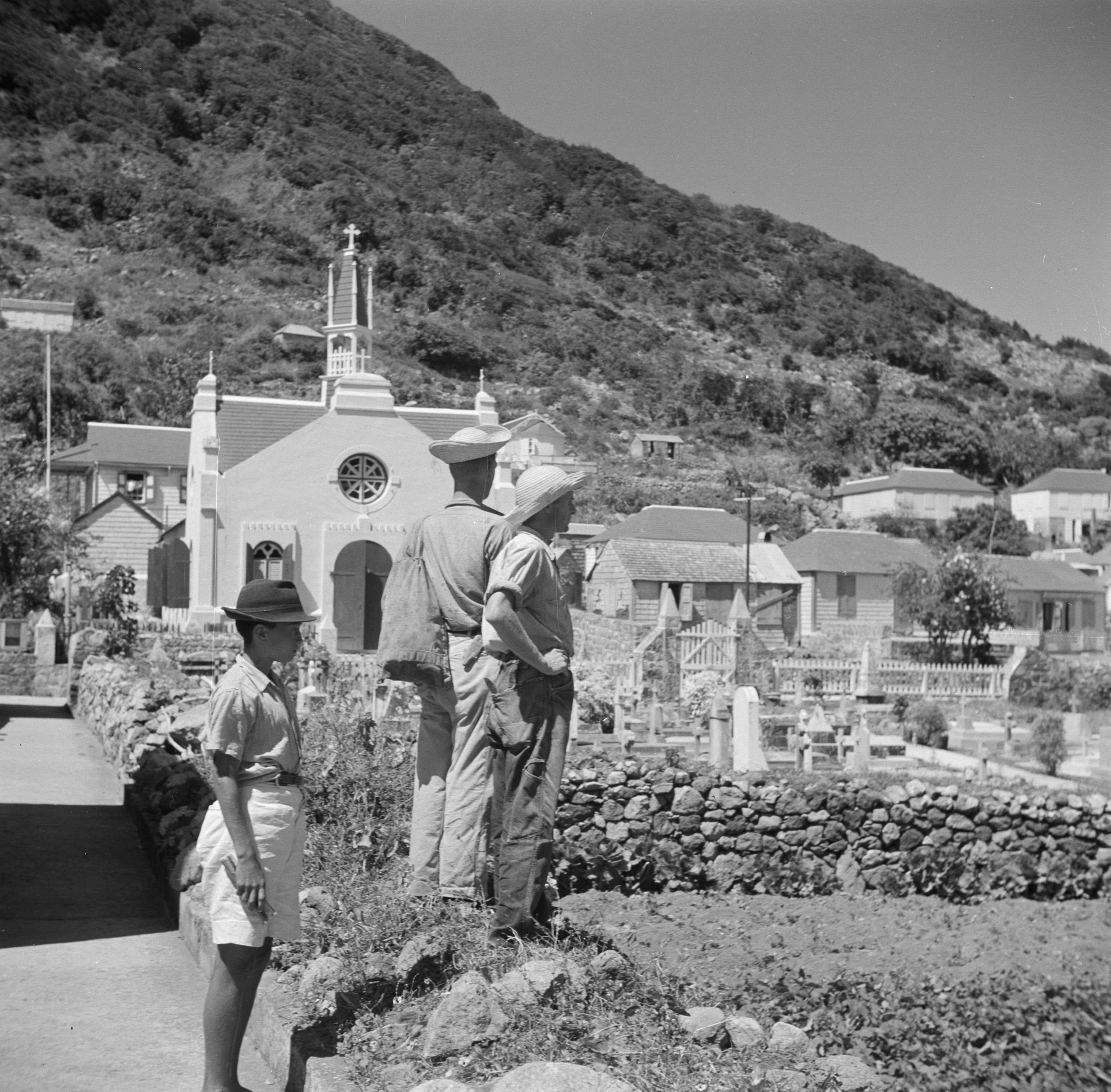

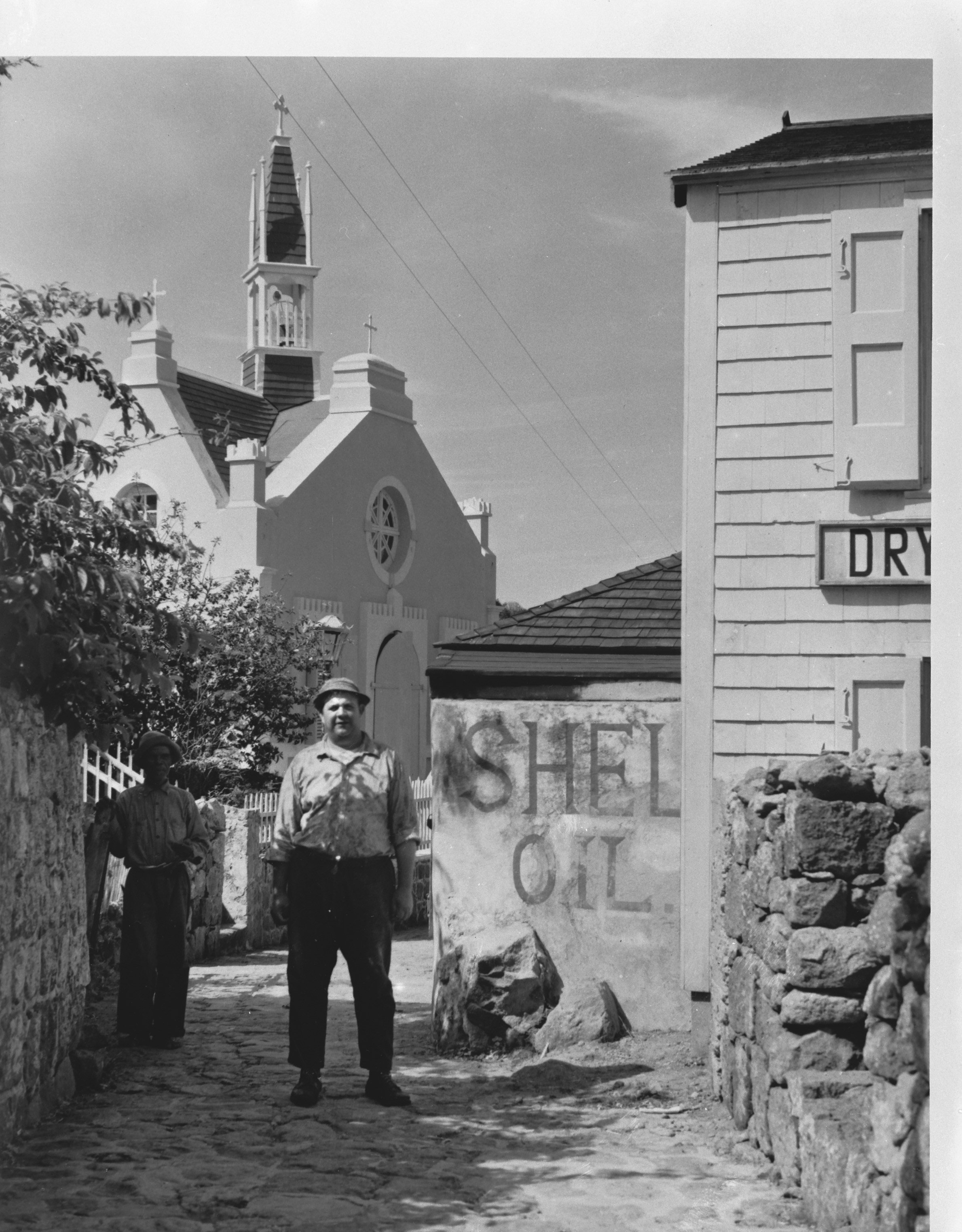

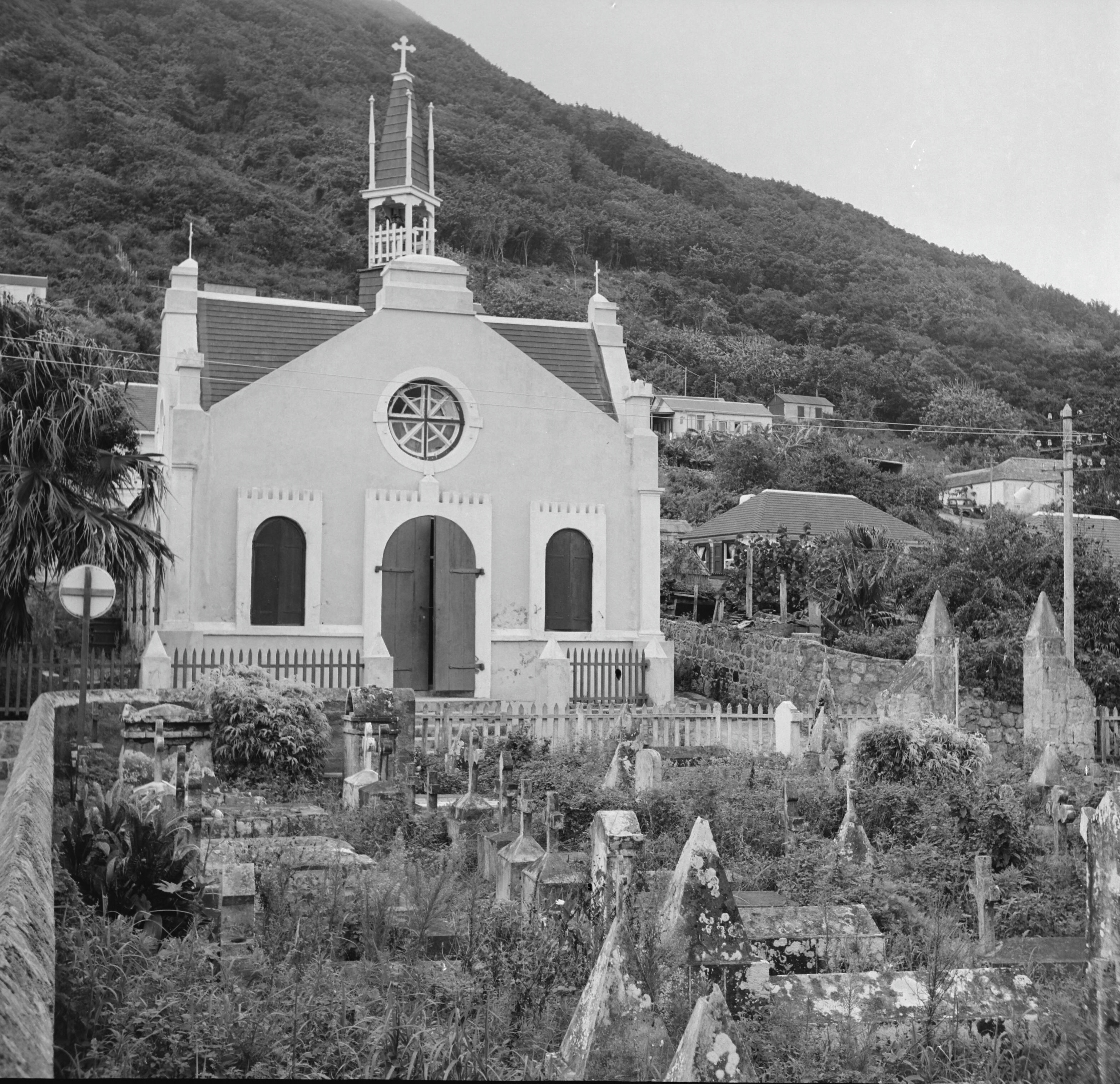
