= Roman Catholic Archdiocese of Kingston =

Roman Catholic Archdiocese of Kingston may refer to:

- Roman Catholic Archdiocese of Kingston, Canada
- Roman Catholic Archdiocese of Kingston, Jamaica

== See also ==
- Roman Catholic Diocese of Kingstown
