= Sacred Heart Church, Saba =

Sacred Heart Church
- Heilige Hart Kerk
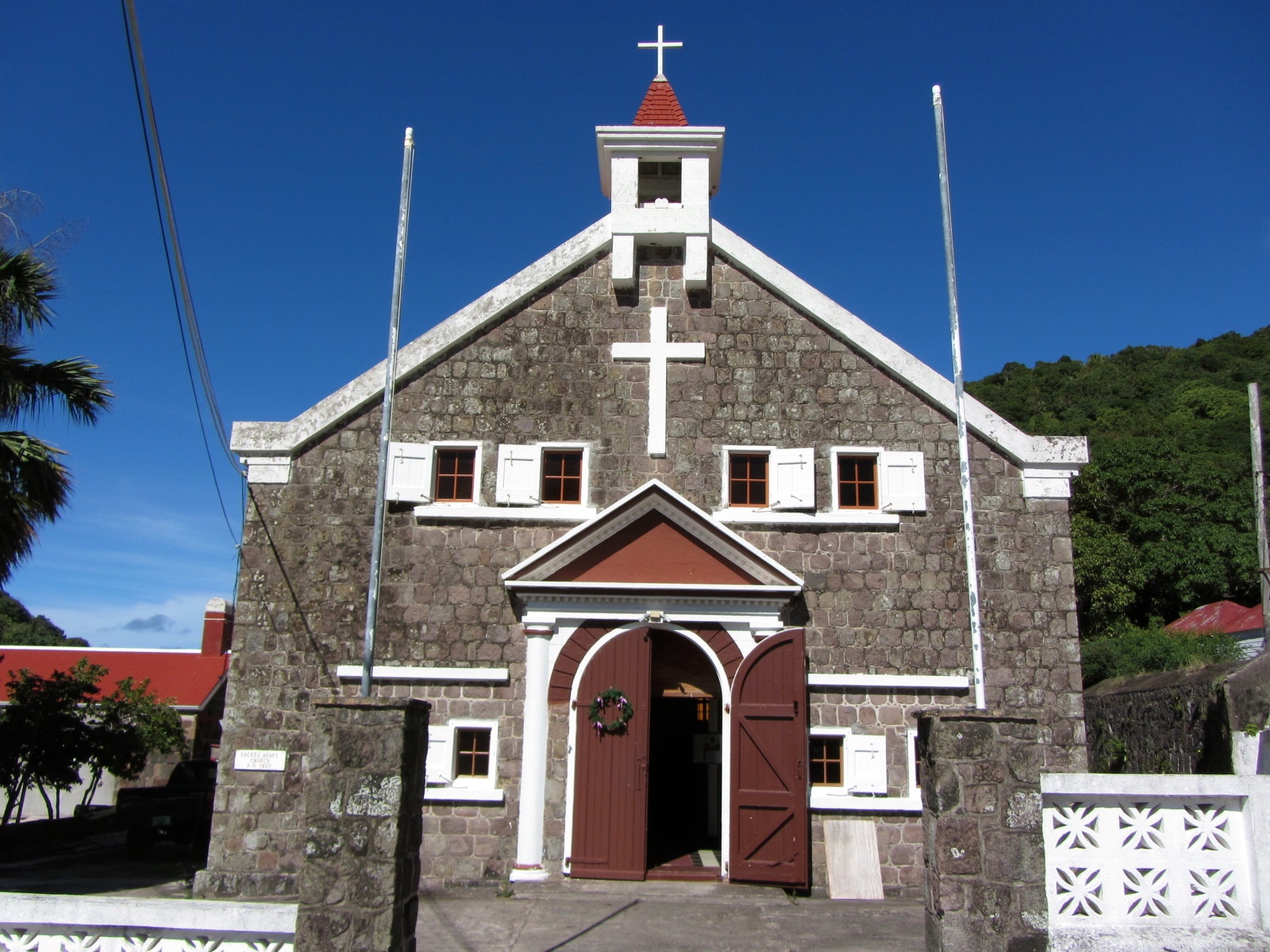
- Sacred Heart Church
- 17°37′38″N 63°15′1″W
- Location: Saba
- Country: Netherlands
- Denomination: Roman Catholic Church

The Sacred Heart Church (Dutch: Heilige Hart Kerk) is a religious building belonging to the Catholic Church and is located in the town of The Bottom, capital of the Caribbean island of Saba a dependent territory that has the status of special municipality of the Kingdom of the Netherlands in the Caribbean Sea or sea of the Antilles.

It was founded in 1877 as a community being formally dedicated on 19 March 1935 by the priest Norbertus Groen. Follow the Roman or Latin rite and depends on the Catholic Diocese of Willemstad based on the island of Curacao. This is one of the three Catholic churches located on the island, the others being the St. Paul's Conversion Church in Windwardside and the Holy Rosary Church (Heilige Rozenkranskerk) in the village of Hell's Gate.

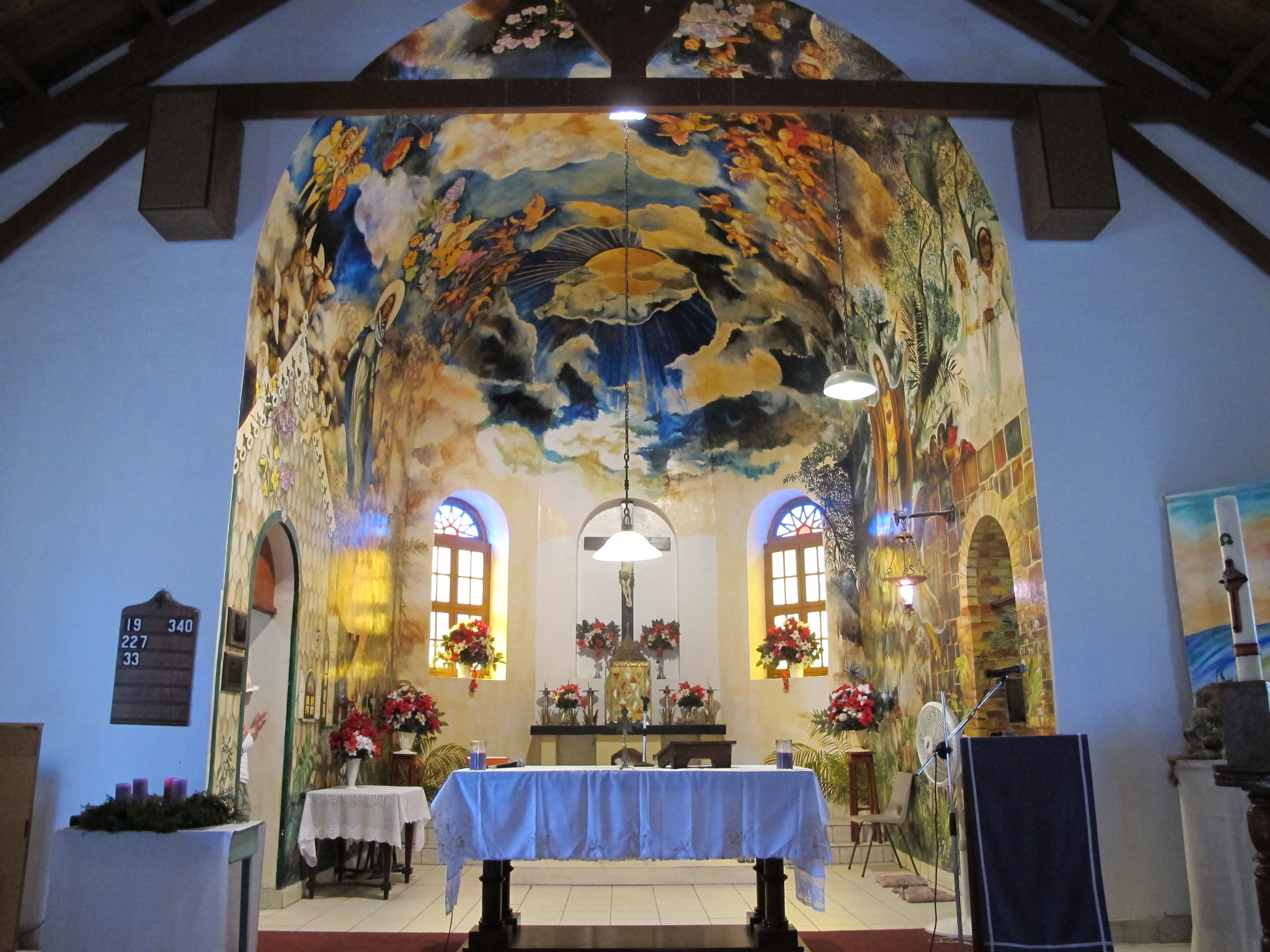
Internal view

== See also ==
- Roman Catholicism in Saba
- Sacred Heart Church (disambiguation)
