= Assumption Cathedral, Kingstown =

Cathedral of the Catholic Diocese of Kingstown

Assumption Cathedral
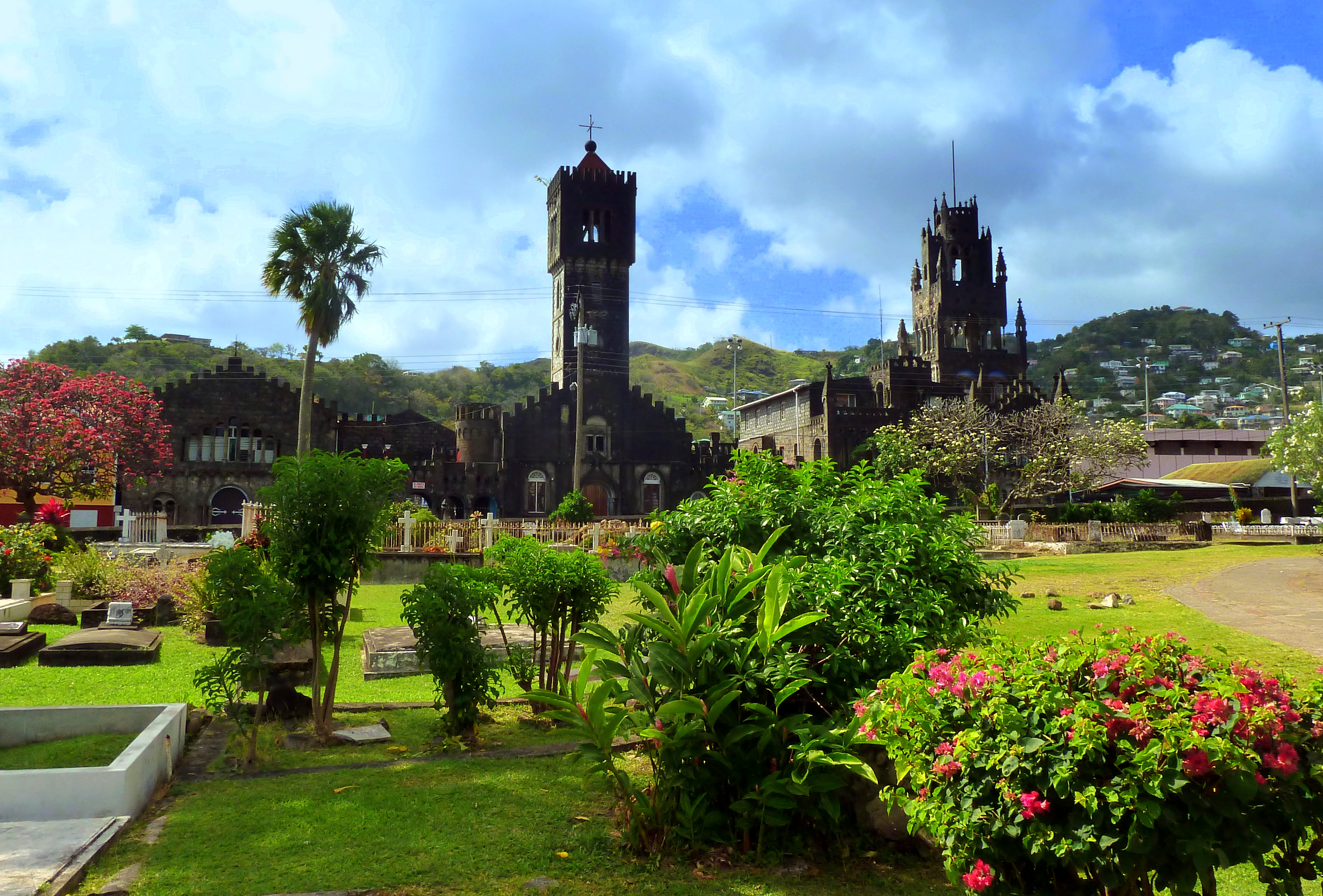
- Assumption Cathedral, Kingstown

- Location within Saint Vincent and the Grenadines
- 13.1588°N 61.2277°W
- Location: Kingstown
- Country: Saint Vincent and the Grenadines
- Denomination: Catholic Church

The Assumption Cathedral, also called Catholic Cathedral of Kingstown or Cathedral of Our Lady of the Assumption or simply St. Mary's Cathedral, is a Catholic cathedral located in the city of Kingstown the capital, port city and the main commercial center of the Caribbean country of Saint Vincent and the Grenadines in the East of the Lesser Antilles. It is the cathedral church of the Diocese of Kingstown.

Its history dates back to a first structure erected in stages from 1823 although the present building was completed in the 1930s decade. It was declared Co-cathedral of the Diocese of Bridgetown-Kingstown in 1971 and since 1989 is Kingstown's Cathedral. It stands out for its striking architecture which is a combination of styles (Moorish, Romanesque, Byzantine, Venetian and Flemish) that strongly contrasts with the rest of the city.

It is under the pastoral responsibility of Bishop Gerard County.

== See also ==
- Roman Catholicism in Saint Vincent and the Grenadines
- Assumption Cathedral

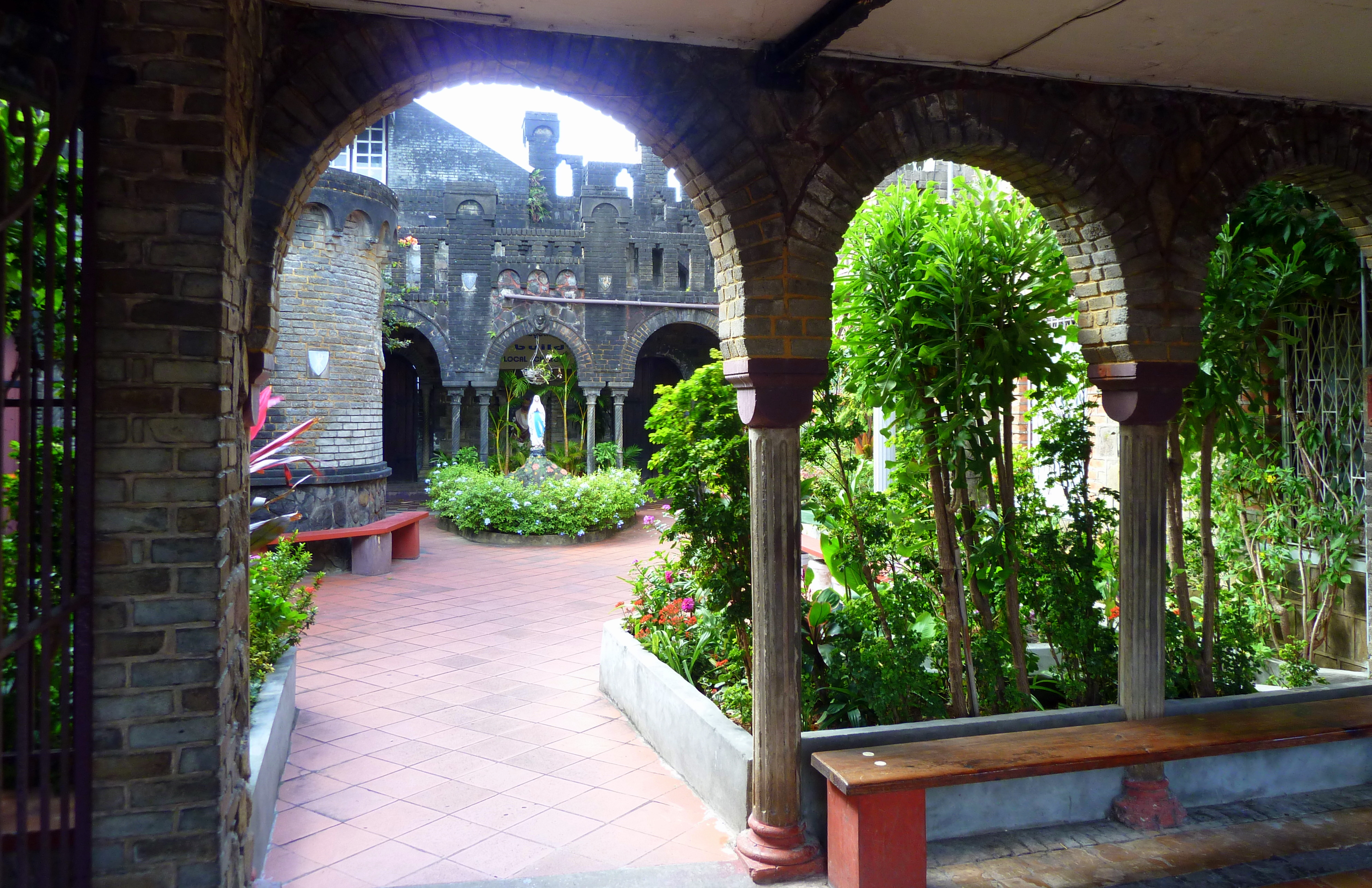
Garden Courtyard
