= Gerard County =

Trinidadian bishop

Gerard Maximin County C.S.Sp.
- Bishop of Kingstown
- Church: Catholic Church
- Diocese: Diocese of Kingstown
- Appointed: 22 December 2015
- Predecessor: Charles Jason Gordon

Orders
- Ordination: 21 January 1996
- Consecration: 20 February 2016 by Joseph Everard Harris

Personal details
- Born: 15 December 1960 (age 65) Port of Spain, Province of Trinidad and Tobago, West Indies Federation, British Empire
- Coat of arms: Gerard Maximin County's coat of arms

Gerard Maximin County (born 15 December 1960 in Port of Spain) is a Trinidadian clergyman and bishop for the Roman Catholic Diocese of Kingstown. He was ordained in 1996, and appointed bishop in 2015. In 2016, he entered into a partnership with the Archdiocese of Louisville to renovate the diocesan pastoral center, among other projects intended to aid Kingstown and other small dioceses in the area. In April 2021, following the eruption of the La Soufriere, he sent a message asking for prayers from the people of St. Vincent and the Grenadines to "bring triumph from tragedy".
