= Malcolm Patrick Galt =

Trinbagonian Roman Catholic bishop (1929–2022)

His Excellency Malcolm Patrick Galt
- Bishop Emeritus of Bridgetown
- Archdiocese: Port of Spain
- Appointed: 23 April 1995
- Term ended: 31 May 2005
- Predecessor: Anthony Hampden Dickson
- Successor: Charles Jason Gordon

Orders
- Ordination: 10 July 1955
- Consecration: 25 July 1995 by Gordon Anthony Pantin

Personal details
- Born: 9 July 1929 Port of Spain, Trinidad and Tobago
- Died: 16 October 2022 (aged 93)

Malcolm Patrick Galt C.S.Sp. (9 July 1929 – 16 October 2022) was the Roman Catholic bishop of the diocese of Bridgetown, Barbados from 23 April 1995 to 31 May 2005.

Galt was born on 9 July 1929 in Trinidad and Tobago. He completed his seminary work in philosophy at Marian University in Montreal and theology at the Holy Ghost Missionary College, Kimmage Manor, Dublin in Ireland and was ordained a priest on 10 July 1955 as a member of the Congregation of the Holy Spirit, a Catholic religious order also known as the Holy Ghost Fathers. He served in various positions, including missionary work in Nigeria, where he taught at Christ the King College, and later in Lagos where he helped to provide food to refugees during the civil war.

He returned to Trinidad and Tobago and in December 1968 was made provincial of the Holy Ghost Fathers in September 1969. The first local provincial. He also served in various parishes, before he was named to lead the diocese of Bridgetown in 1995, a position that he held until his retirement in 2005.

Catholic Church titles
Preceded by Anthony Hampden Dickson	Bishop of Warmia; 1995–2005	Succeeded by Charles Jason Gordon
