= Neil Sebastian Scantlebury =

Barbadian Catholic Bishop, Diocese of Bridgetown

The Reverend Neil Sebastian Scantlebury
- Bishop of Bridgetown
- Church: Roman Catholic Church
- Diocese: Bridgetown
- See: Bridgetown
- Appointed: December 28, 2020
- Installed: June 11, 2021
- Predecessor: Charles Jason Gordon

Orders
- Ordination: May 18, 1995 by Elliot Griffin Thomas
- Consecration: June 11, 2021 by Fortunatus Nwachukwu

Personal details
- Born: Neil Sebastian Scantlebury; October 1, 1965 (age 61) Barbados
- Coat of arms

Styles of Neil Sebastian Scantlebury
- Reference style: The Most Reverend
- Spoken style: Your Excellency
- Religious style: Bishop

Neil Sebastian Scantlebury (born 1 October 1965) is a Barbadian Catholic Bishop who has been the head of the Diocese of Bridgetown since 2021. He is the first native Barbadian to occupy the role.

== Biography ==
Scantlebury was born in Barbados to Keith and Myrna Scantlebury, both now deceased. His father was a Catholic deacon. Aside from his native English and Creole, he is fluent in Latin, Spanish, and French.

After completing his primary and secondary education in Barbados, Scantlebury attended the University of the West Indies in Trinidad and Tobago, graduating with a degree in mechanical engineering. After graduating, Scantlebury then moved to the US Virgin Islands to teach religious education at the Catholic school of St Peter and Paul Cathedral, St Thomas. He then entered priestly formation, and attended Mount St. Mary's Seminary, Emmitsburg, Maryland. In 1999, he obtained the Master of Art in Sacred Scripture from Mount St. Mary's.

On 18 May 1995, Scantlebury was ordained to the priesthood, for the Diocese of Saint Thomas in the Virgin Islands. On 28 December 2020, Pope Francis appointed Scantlebury as the new bishop of the Diocese of Bridgetown, succeeding Charles Jason Gordon.

Scantlebury was consecrated bishop on 12 June 2021 by Fortunatus Nwachukwu, the apostolic nuncio to the Caribbean region. Charles Jason Gordon, archbishop of Port-of-Spain and Robert Rivas, bishop of Castries, where the co-consecrators. In doing so Scantlebury became the first native Barbadian to head the diocese of Bridgetown.
