= Holy Rosary Church, Saba =

Holy Rosary Church
- Heilige Rozenkranskerk
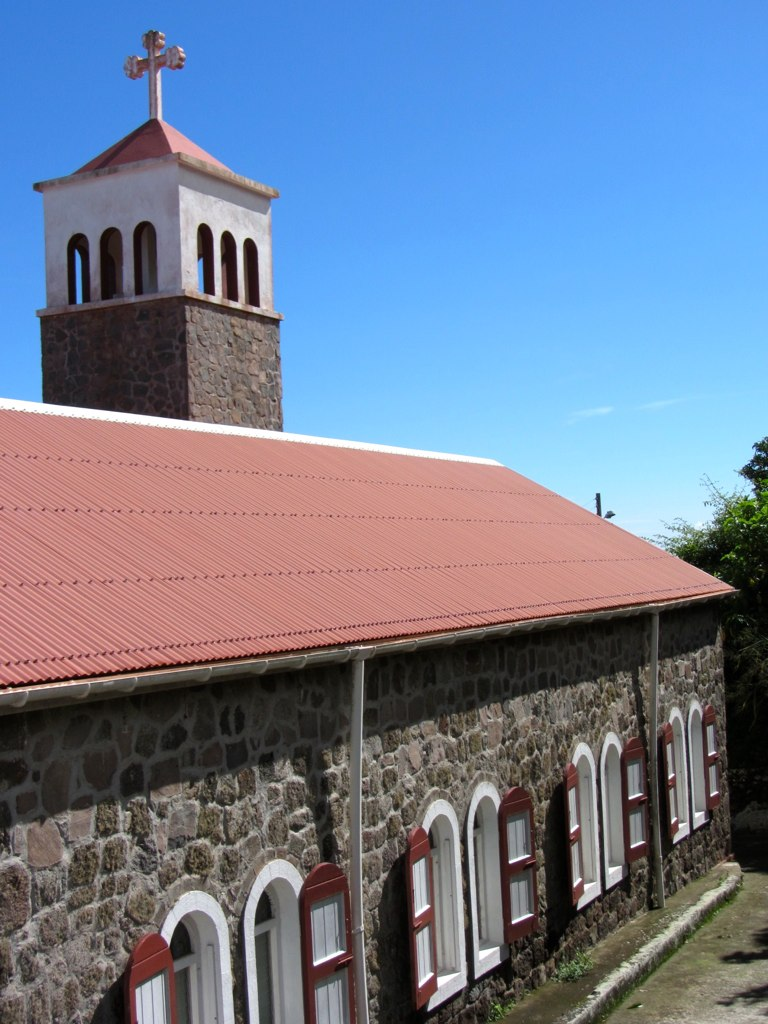
- Holy Rosary Church
- 17.63895°N 63.22977°W
- Location: Saba
- Country: Netherlands
- Denomination: Roman Catholic Church

The Holy Rosary Church (Dutch: Heilige Rozenkranskerk), also known as the Queen of the Holy Rosary Church, is a religious building affiliated with the Catholic church in the small town of Hell's Gate on the island of Saba, a dependent territory of the Kingdom of the Netherlands in the Lesser Antilles, Caribbean Sea.

== History ==
The history of the church dates back to 1911 when the first wooden chapel was established for the Catholic community. Then in 1962, the current building was constructed in the same place and was dedicated by Bishop Holterman.

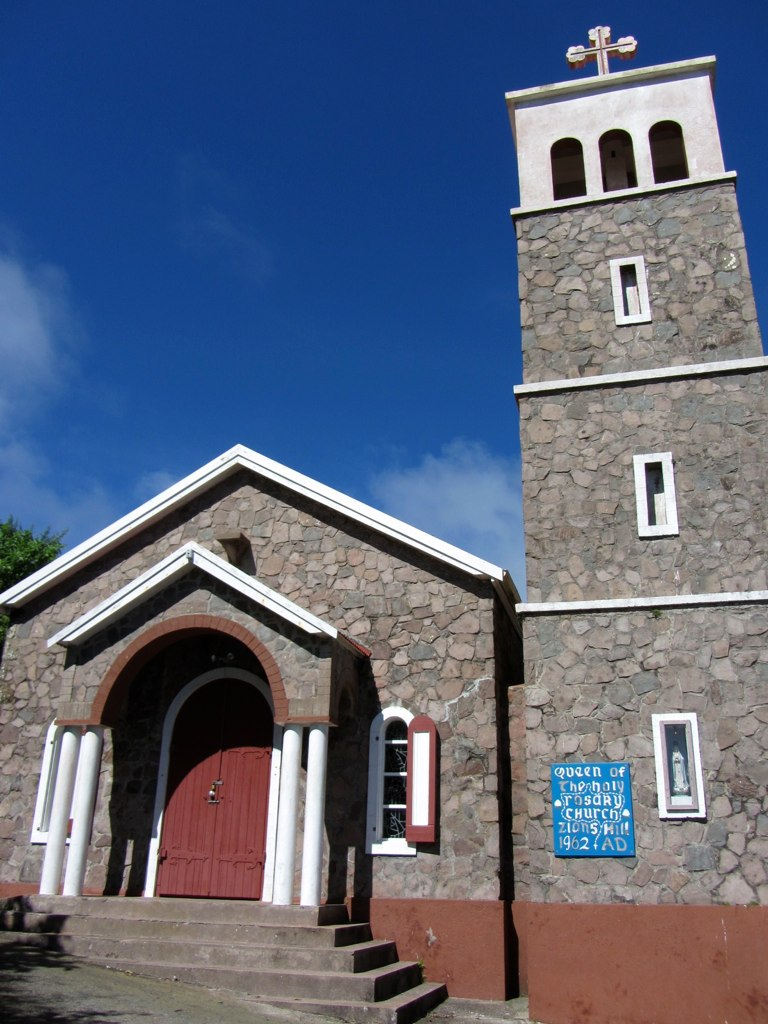
Another View

The temple follows the Roman or Latin rite and depends on the mission of the Conversion of St. Paul in the Catholic Diocese of Willemstad based on the island of Curaçao. It is one of three Catholic churches on the island, along with Sacred Heart Church and St. Paul's Conversion Church.

Due to its location on the top of a hill, it has previously been used as a training area for the Royal Dutch Marines. As a result of protests from members of the church against Hell's Gate being the official name for where the church is located, the Saban authorities officially renamed it to Zion's Hill (though the original name of Hell's Gate still remained popular locally).

== Design ==
The church was originally constructed rectangular with wooden walls, that later became further embellished. The reconstruction of the church kept the original rectangular layout but built the new church building with a stone gabled roof made of locally sourced Saban stone. It also had a rectangular tower added with white painted bands marking each level externally.

== Gallery ==
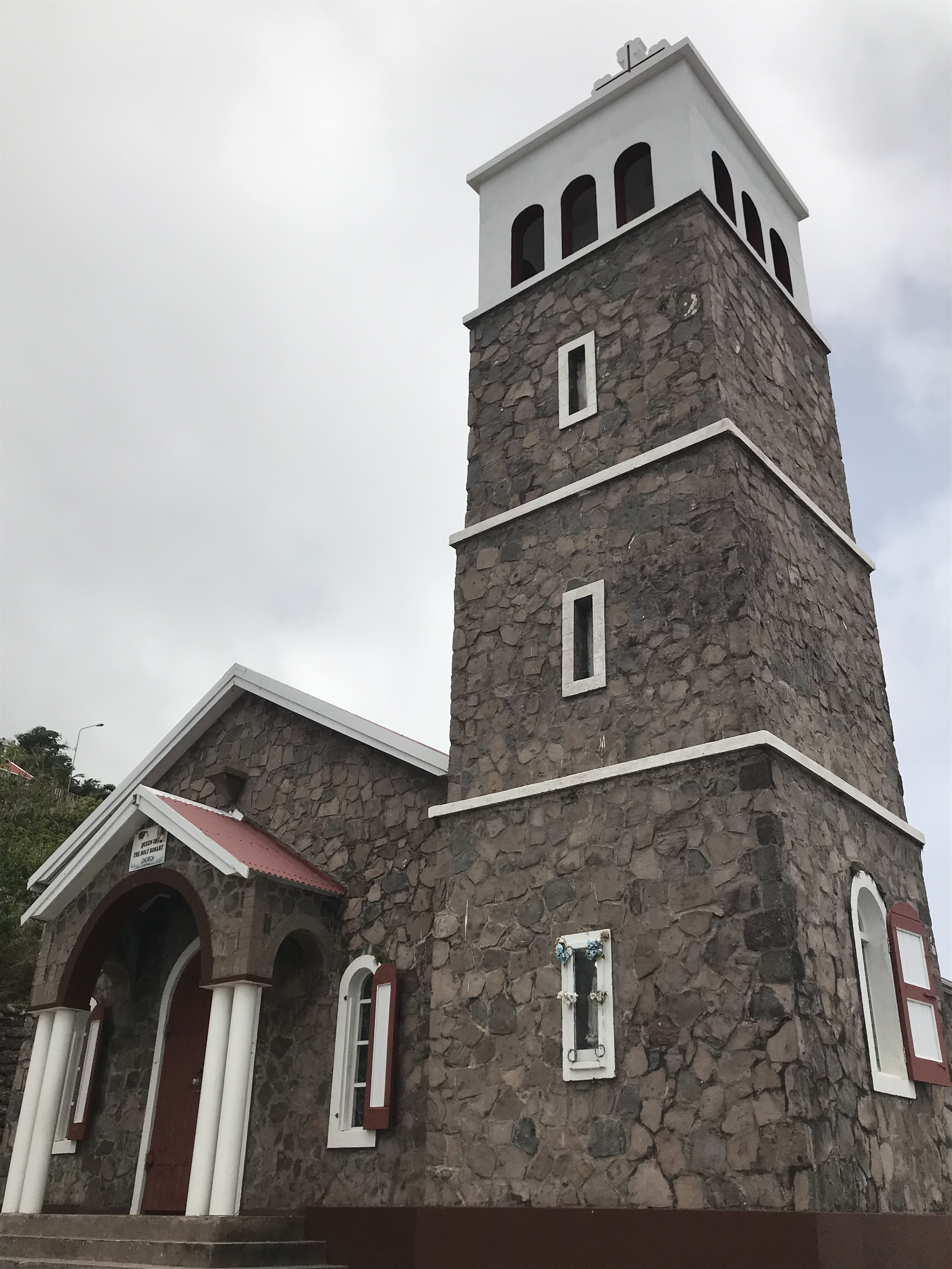
Church tower

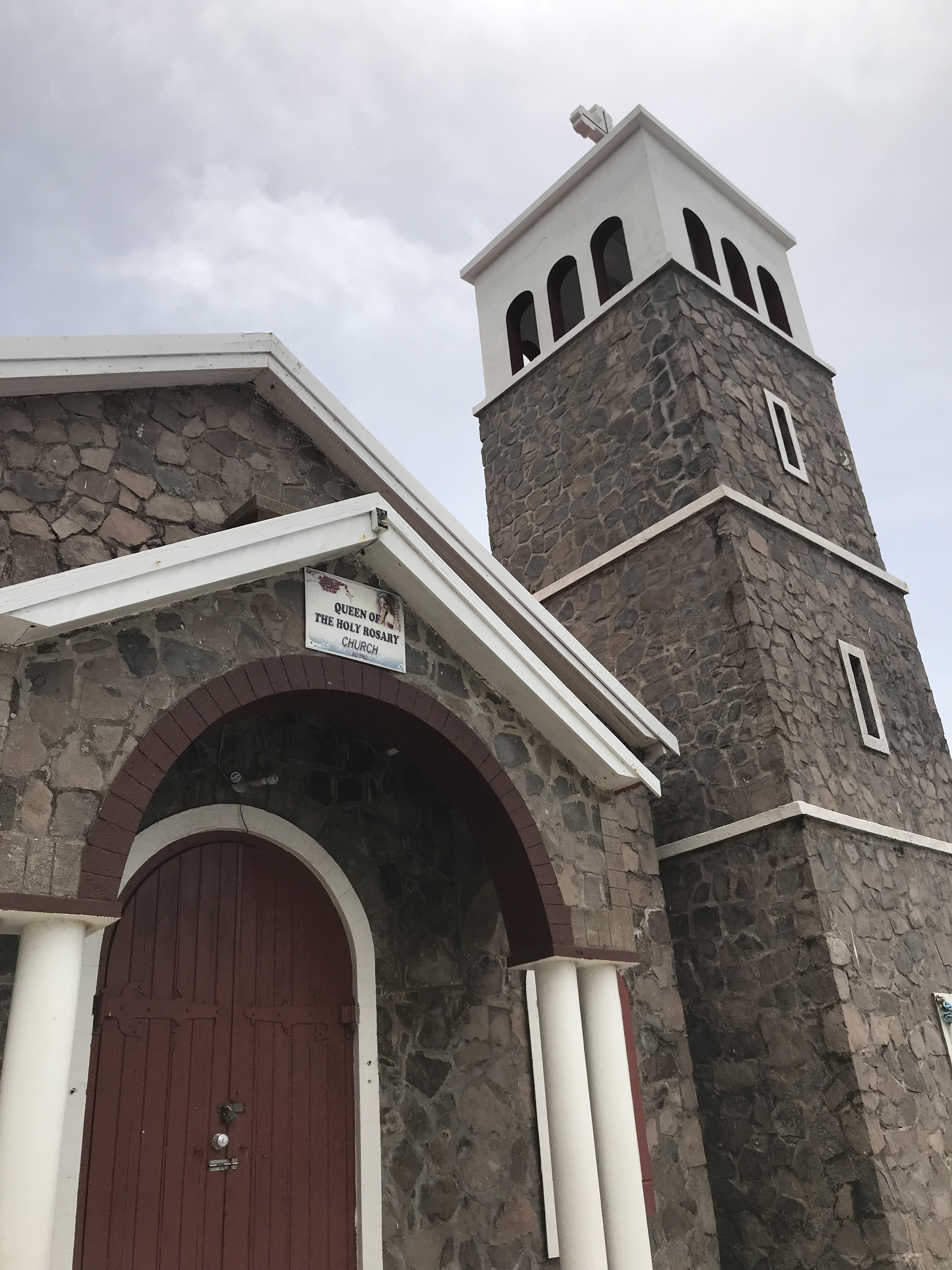
Church entrance

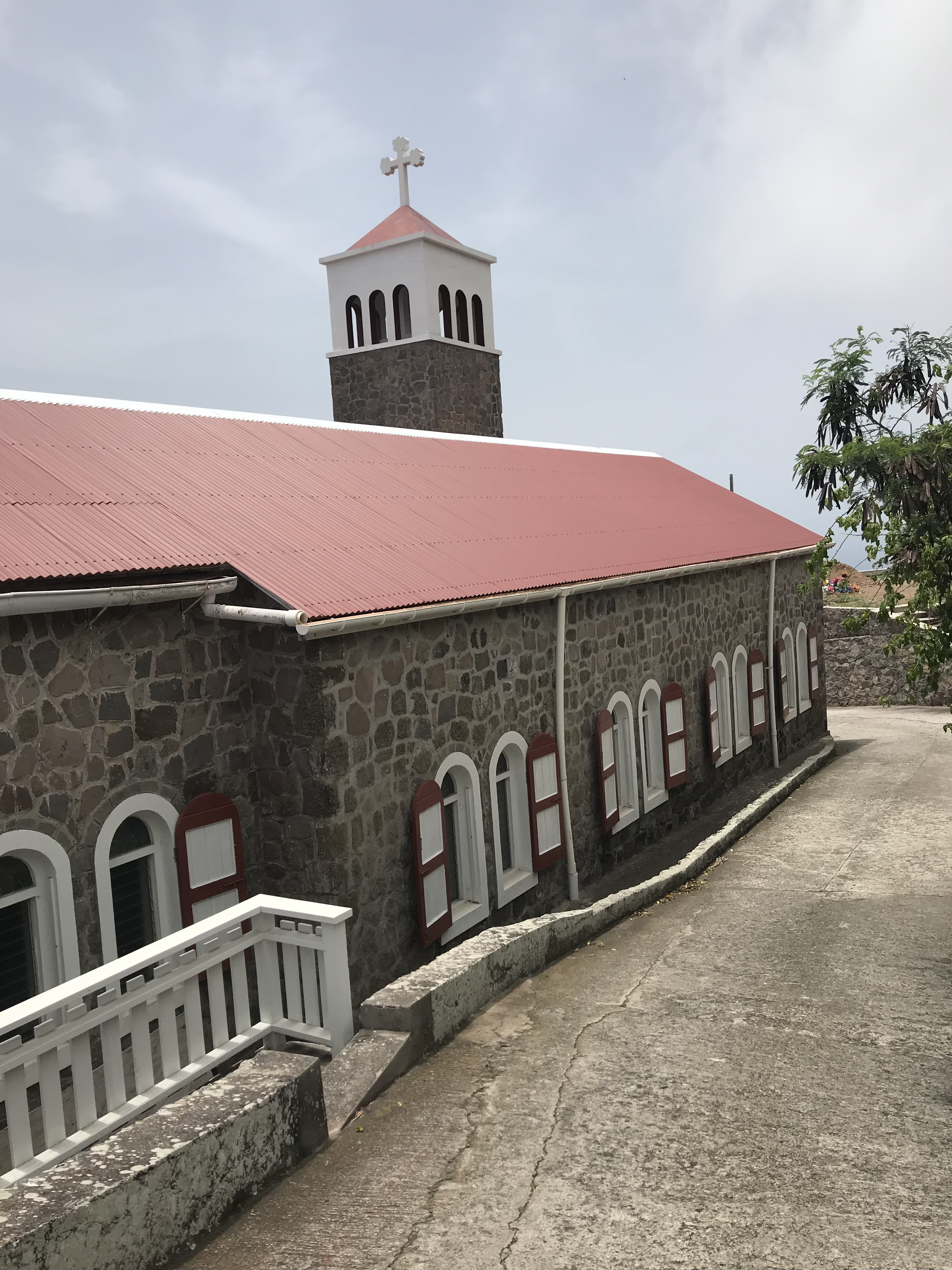
View of church from road behind
