= Anthony Hampden Dickson =

Jamaican clergyman and bishop (1935–2022)

His Excellency Anthony Hampden Dickson
- Bishop Emeritus of Bridgetown
- Metropolis: Port of Spain
- Appointed: 19 October 1970
- Term ended: 23 April 1995
- Predecessor: Post created
- Successor: Malcolm Patrick Galt
- Previous post: Bishop of Bridgetown-Kingstown (1970–1989)

Orders
- Ordination: 11 February 1962
- Consecration: 29 January 1971 by John Joseph McEleney

Personal details
- Born: 3 November 1935 Kingston, Jamaica
- Died: 29 November 2022 (aged 87) Bridgetown, Barbados
- Coat of arms

Anthony Hampden Dickson (3 November 1935 – 29 November 2022) was a Jamaican clergyman and bishop for the Roman Catholic Diocese of Bridgetown. Dickson was born in Kingston, Jamaica on 3 November 1935. He became ordained in 1962, and appointed bishop in 1975. Dickson resigned in 1995.

Dickson died in Barbados on 29 November 2022, at the age of 87.

Catholic Church titles
Preceded by Post created	Bishop of Bridgetown; 1989–1995	Succeeded by Malcolm Patrick Galt
Preceded by Post created	Bishop of Bridgetown-Kingstown; 1970–1989	Succeeded by Post abolished
