= Catholic Church in Barbados =

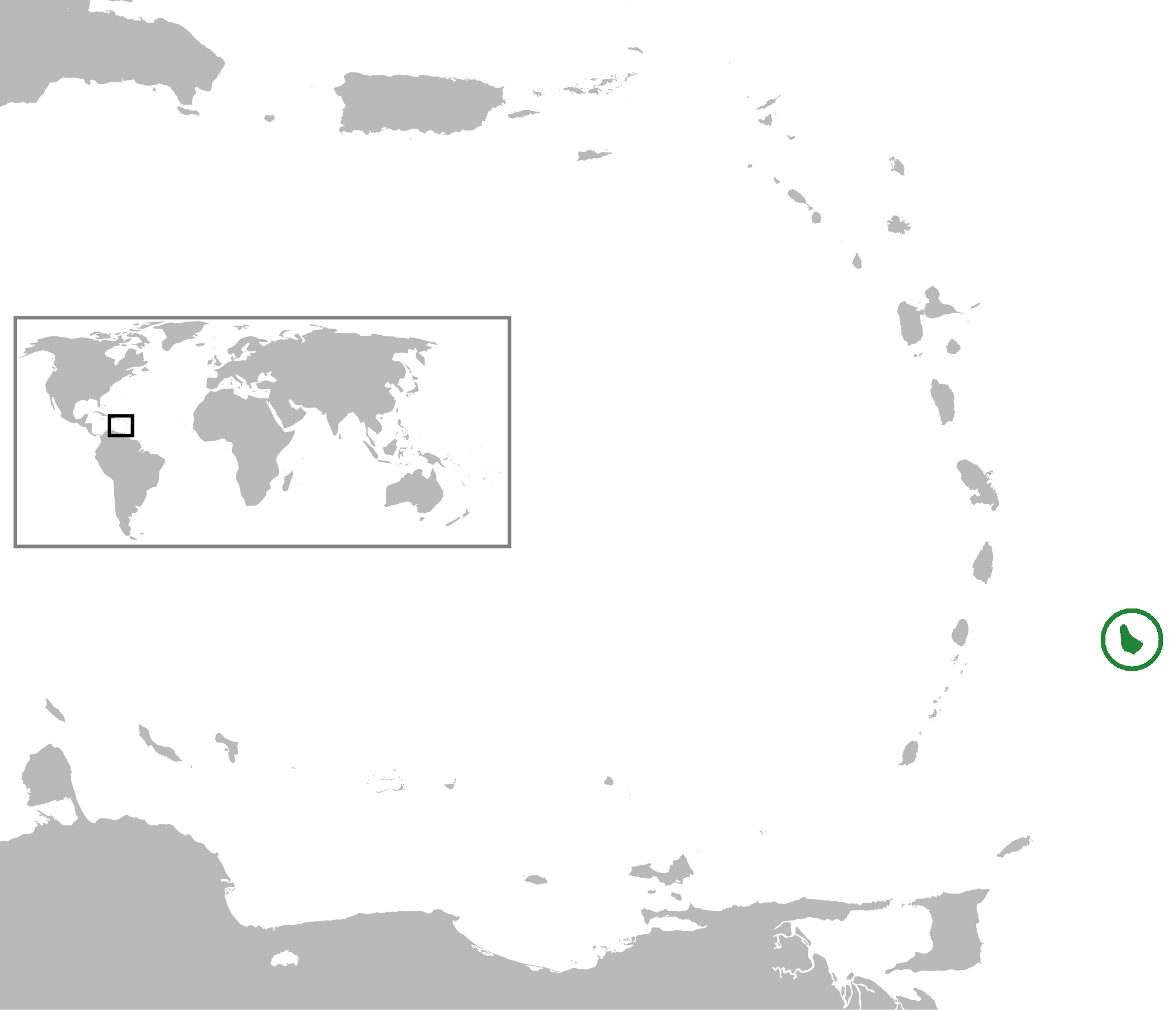
Barbados on a World Map

The Catholic Church in Barbados is part of the worldwide Catholic Church, under the spiritual leadership of the Pope in Rome. At first, Catholicism had difficulty establishing itself in Barbados, which early in its colonial history was primarily Protestant, but with the abolition of slavery there in 1838, it began to take root. Currently, Catholics comprise about 4% of churchgoing Barbadians under the Diocese of Bridgetown.

== Churches ==
The Catholic churches in Barbados are:

- St. Patrick's Cathedral, Bridgetown
- Our Lady Queen of the Universe, Bridgetown
- St. Dominic's Catholic Church, Christ Church
- Our Lady of Sorrow, St. Peter
- Our Lady of the Rosary Church, St.John
- Sacred Heart Catholic Church, St.Phillip
- St.Francis of Assisi Catholic Church, St.James
