= Catholic Church in Saint Vincent and the Grenadines =

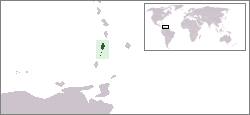
St Vincent and The Grenadines on a map

The Catholic Church in Saint Vincent and the Grenadines is part of the Catholic Church in communion with the Bishop of Rome, the Pope.

The 2012 official census of Saint Vincent and the Grenadines reported that there are an estimated 6.877 Catholics in the country, representing 6.3% from country's population.

== Ecclesiastical organization ==
The state of Saint Vincent and the Grenadines includes the island of Saint Vincent and part of the archipelago of the Grenadines. The Catholic religion is the third in the country after the Anglicanism and Methodism. On 23 October 1989 was erected the Diocese of Kingstown by Pope John Paul II, following the division of the Diocese of Bridgetown-Kingstown, from which it originated also the Diocese of Bridgetown. The Diocese of Kingstown is the only ecclesiastical district in the country. It includes seven parishes, including 3 on the island of Saint Vincent and four in the Grenadines. The local bishop is a member by right of the Antilles Episcopal Conference.

== Apostolic Nunciature ==
The Apostolic Nuncio of Saint Vincent and the Grenadines was established on 17 April 1990, with the Papal brief Universalis for terras of Pope John Paul II.

== Nuncios ==
- Eugenio Sbarbaro (7 February 1991 - 26 April 2000 appointed apostolic nuncio to Serbia and Montenegro)
- Emil Paul Tscherrig (8 July 2000 - 22 May 2004 appointed Apostolic Nuncio of Korea)
- Thomas Edward Gullickson (2 October 2004 - 21 May 2011 appointed Apostolic Nuncio of Ukraine)
- Nicola Girasoli, from 29 October 2011

== See also ==
- Diocese of Kingstown
