= St. Patrick's Cathedral, Bridgetown =

Church in Bridgetown, Barbados

St. Patrick's Cathedral
- St. Patrick's Cathedral
- 54.00395°N 6.39924°W
- Location: Bridgetown
- Country: Barbados
- Denomination: Roman Catholic Church

Architecture
- Years built: 1899–1903

Administration
- Province: Port of Spain
- Diocese: Bridgetown

St. Patrick's Cathedral, located in Bridgetown, Barbados, is the seat of the Roman Catholic Diocese of Bridgetown. It is one of two cathedrals in that territory, the other being the Anglican Cathedral of St. Michael.

Originally built in 1848, St. Patrick's was virtually destroyed by a fire in 1897, suspected to have been started by Protestant elements. A new cathedral church, however, was completed in 1899 and consecrated on August 23, 1903. Today it houses the Catholic religious services, has a training center and has a collection of heraldic plates. It became a cathedral in 1970 with the creation of the Diocese of Bridgetown (Dioecesis Pontipolitana).

Since 2011 it has been listed in as a Unesco World Heritage Site as part of the historic center of Bridgetown.

== See also ==
- Catholic Church in Barbados
