= Windwardside =

Village in Saba, Dutch Caribbean

- Town
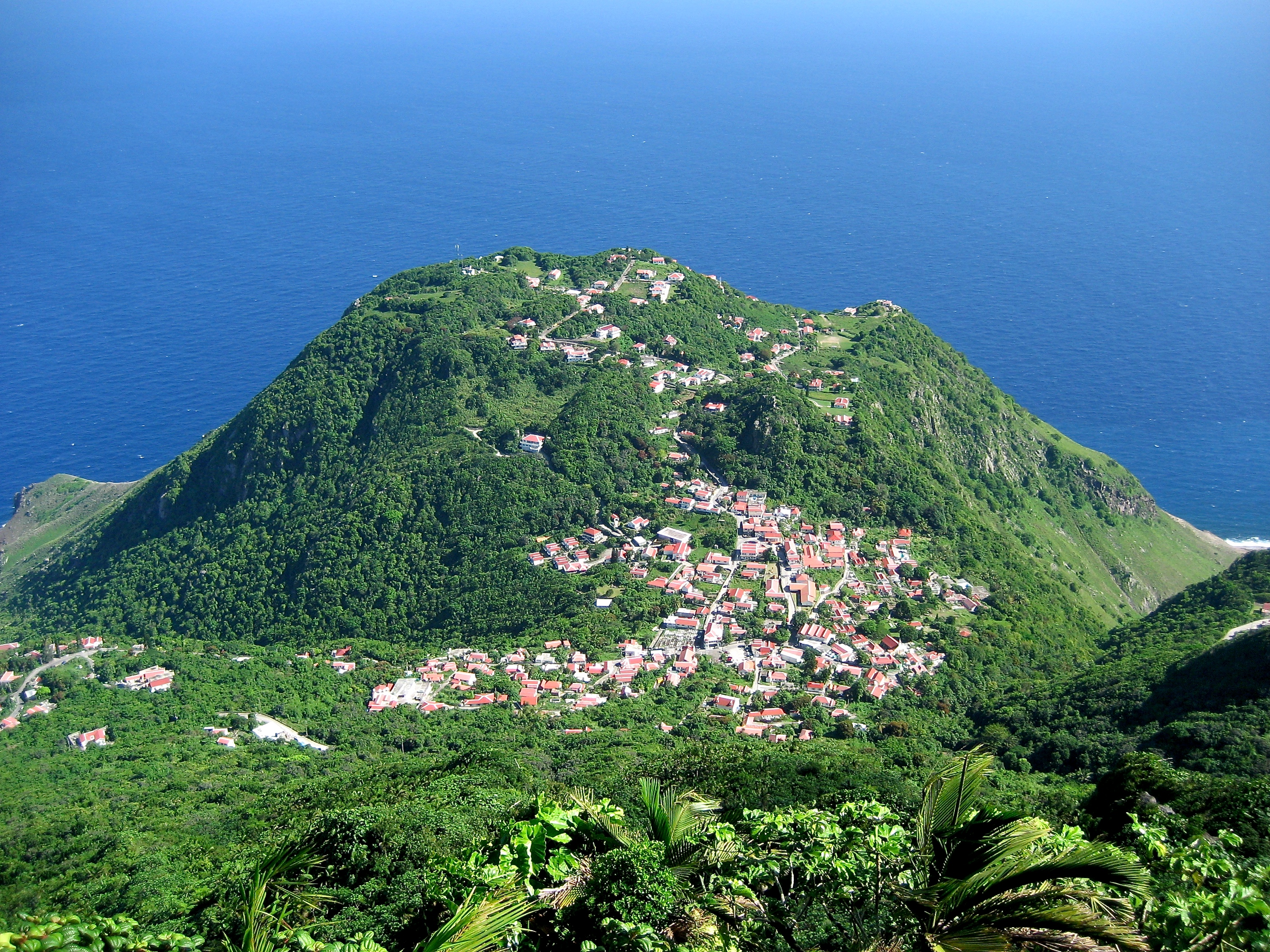
- Windwardside as seen from Mount Scenery, with houses extending into The Level and Booby Hill

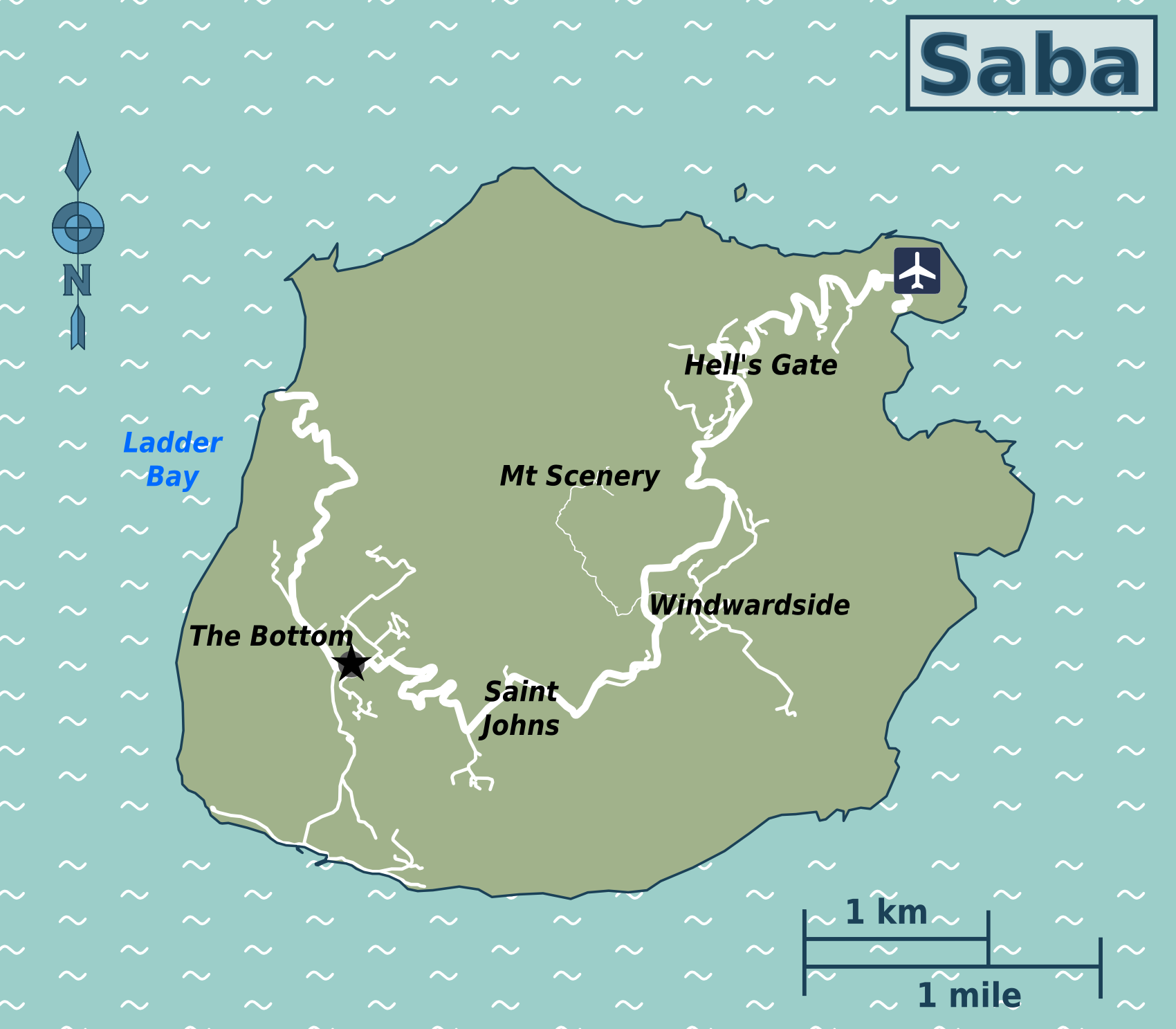
- Map of Saba showing Windwardside
- Coordinates: 17°37′44.12″N 63°13′53.49″W
- Country: Netherlands
- Public body: Saba
- Elevation: 400 m (1,300 ft)

Population (2001)
  - Total: 418
- Time zone: UTC-4 (AST)
- Climate: Aw

Windwardside is the second largest town on the Dutch Caribbean island of Saba, aptly named for being on the windward side of the island.

== History ==
The first permanent European settlements on Saba began in the 1640s. By the 1860s, Windwardside was one of 7 main districts on the island, with The Bottom, St. John's, Booby Hill, Hell's Gate, Mary's Point (Palmetto Point), and Middle Island. The Windwardside district had its own elected head, as did the other six districts. In 1860, the St. Paul's Conversion Church, Saba was built on the grounds of the former quarantine station in Windwardside. In 1865, the population of Windwardside was 573 inhabitants.

Throughout the 18th, 19th, and early 20th centuries, most men in Windwardside engaged in farming or fishing. Most women engaged in domestic work in the home, as well as local drawn thread work known as Saba Lace.

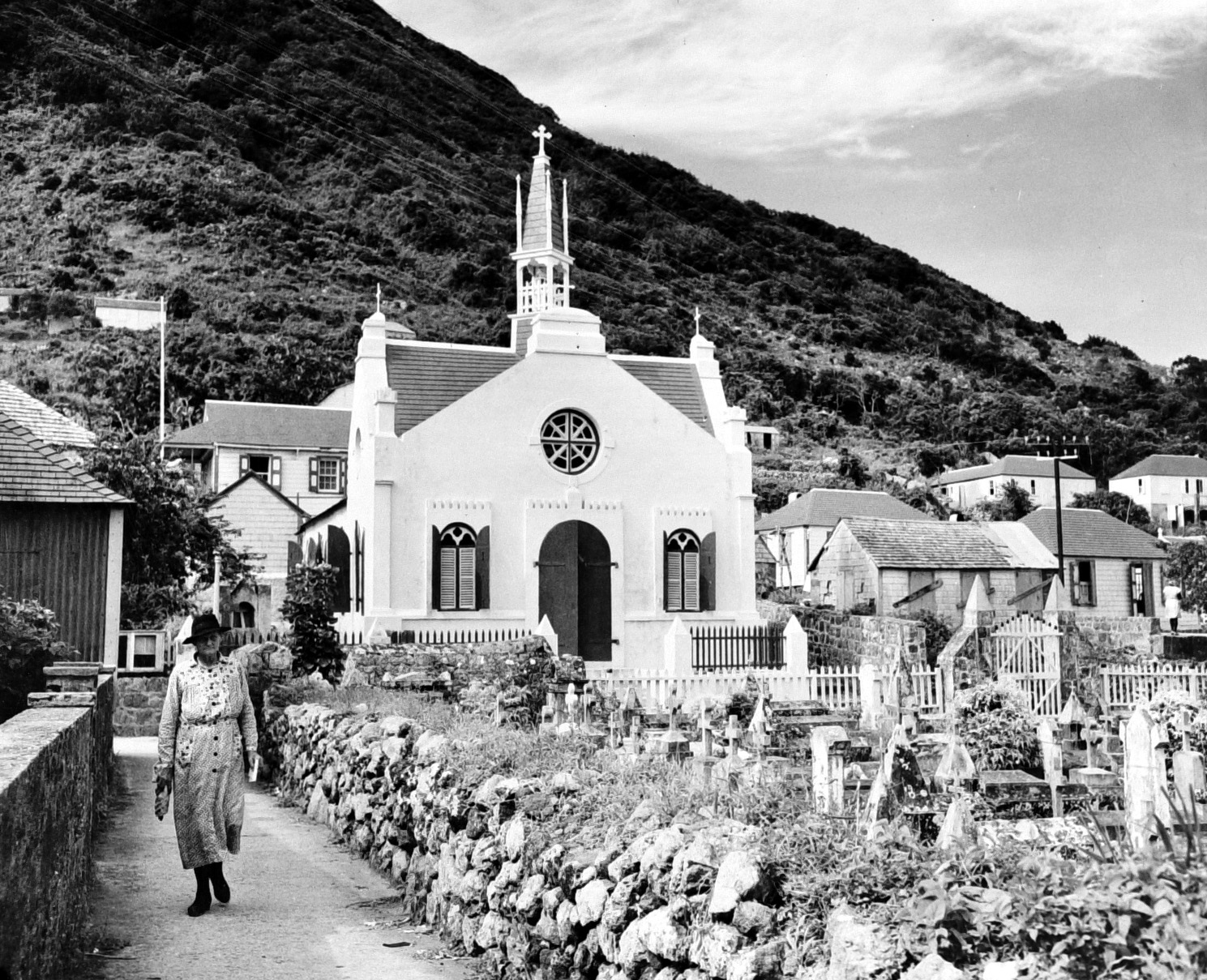
Windwardside in 1947

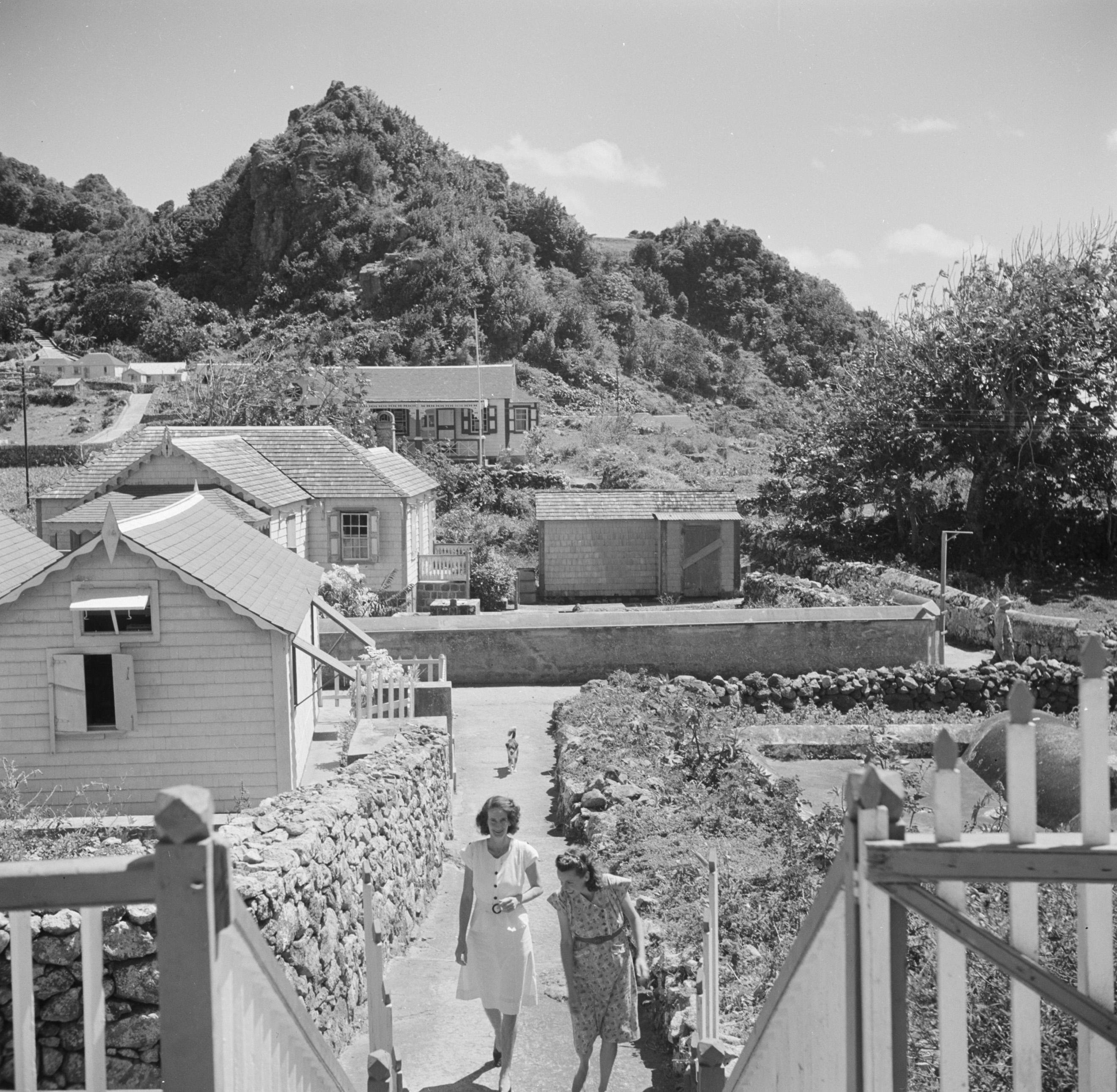
Photo of Windwardside in 1947

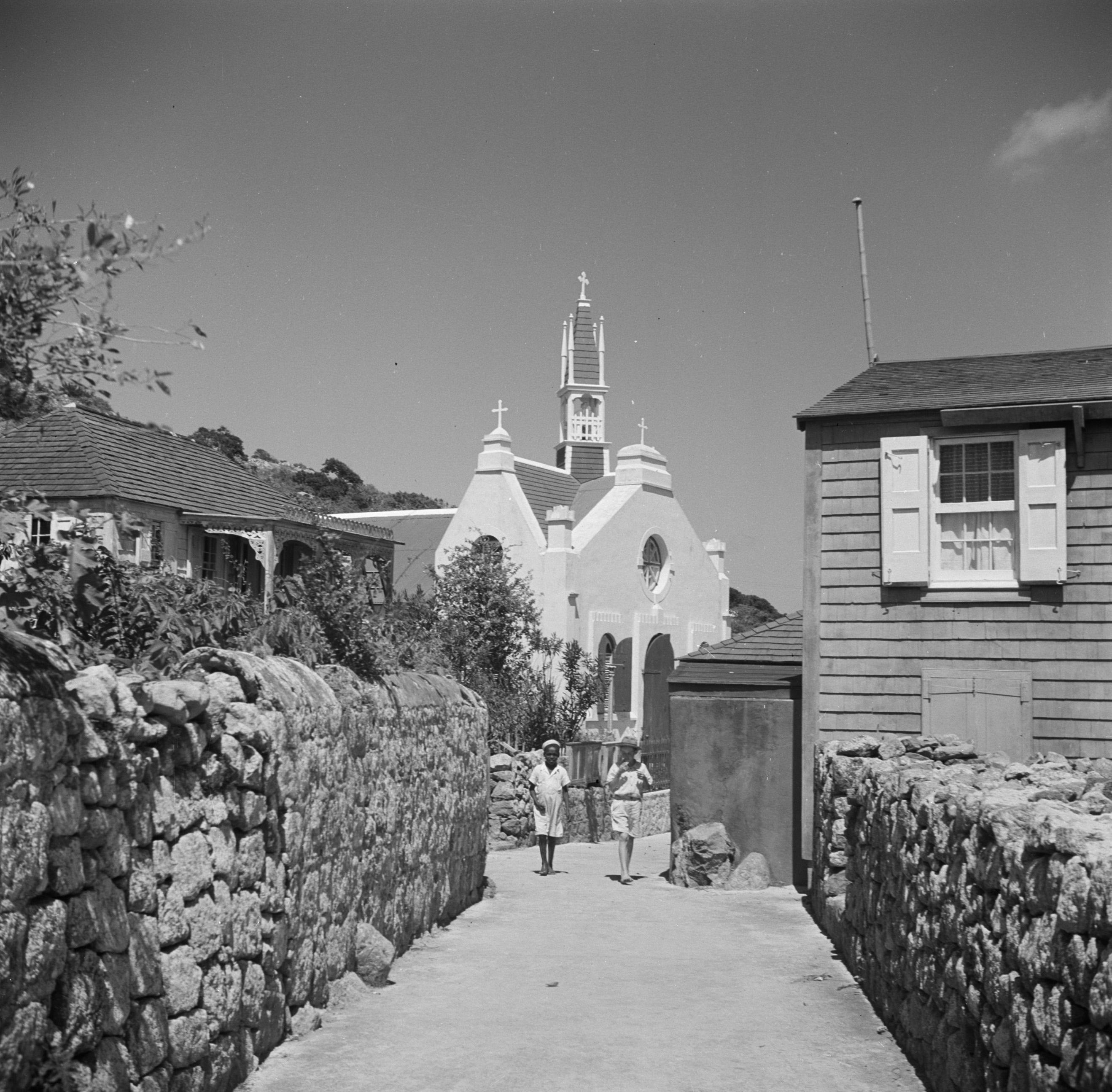
Photo of Windwardside in 1947

By 1900, Windwardside was one of four main villages on Saba, along with The Bottom, St. John's, and Hell's Gate. The early- to mid- 1900s saw extensive emigration from Saba. In 1972, the population of Windwardside had decreased to 302 inhabitants.

In the late 20th century, Windwardside began expanding. The Tourism Office opened in Windwardside along with restaurants, grocery stores, a bank, a post office, hotels, and gift shops. In 2001, the population of Windwardside was 418 inhabitants.

== Geography ==
Most of Windwardside is located in a saddle between a dormant volcano (Mount Scenery) and a hill (Booby Hill). The saddle's elevation is about 1,400 ft (427 m) above sea level. Some Windwardside homes are located up the mountainside of village. Many homes are located up the hillside of the village, on Booby Hill and an area of Booby Hill called The Level. The elevation of The Level is about 1,584 feet (483 m) above sea level. The Mas Cojones Hill is also a scenic tourist destination that looks out over Windwardside.

== Tourism ==
Windwardside has several hotels and inns which serve mostly tourists who come to the island to dive and enjoy Saba's nature. There are multiple grocery stores, restaurants, gift shops, and a dive shop located there as well.

The Harry L. Johnson Museum is located in Windwardside. The museum is located inside an authentic 19th-century Saban cottage, with few changes having been made to the original cottage. Inside, visitors can view 19th and early 20th-century furniture, linens, china, nautical instruments, and a 100-year old organ harmonium. Also on display are photographs and documents, as well as Amerindian artifacts from archaeological sites on the island. The museum grounds feature tropical vegetation and a children's play area.

The Mt. Scenery Trail, Saba's most popular hiking trail, begins in Windwardside. The trailhead is located on the road just outside Windwardside, across from the Trail Shop. The trail is a strenuous out-and-back trail, which goes up to Mt. Scenery's summit and back, and takes about 90 minutes each way.

== Gallery ==
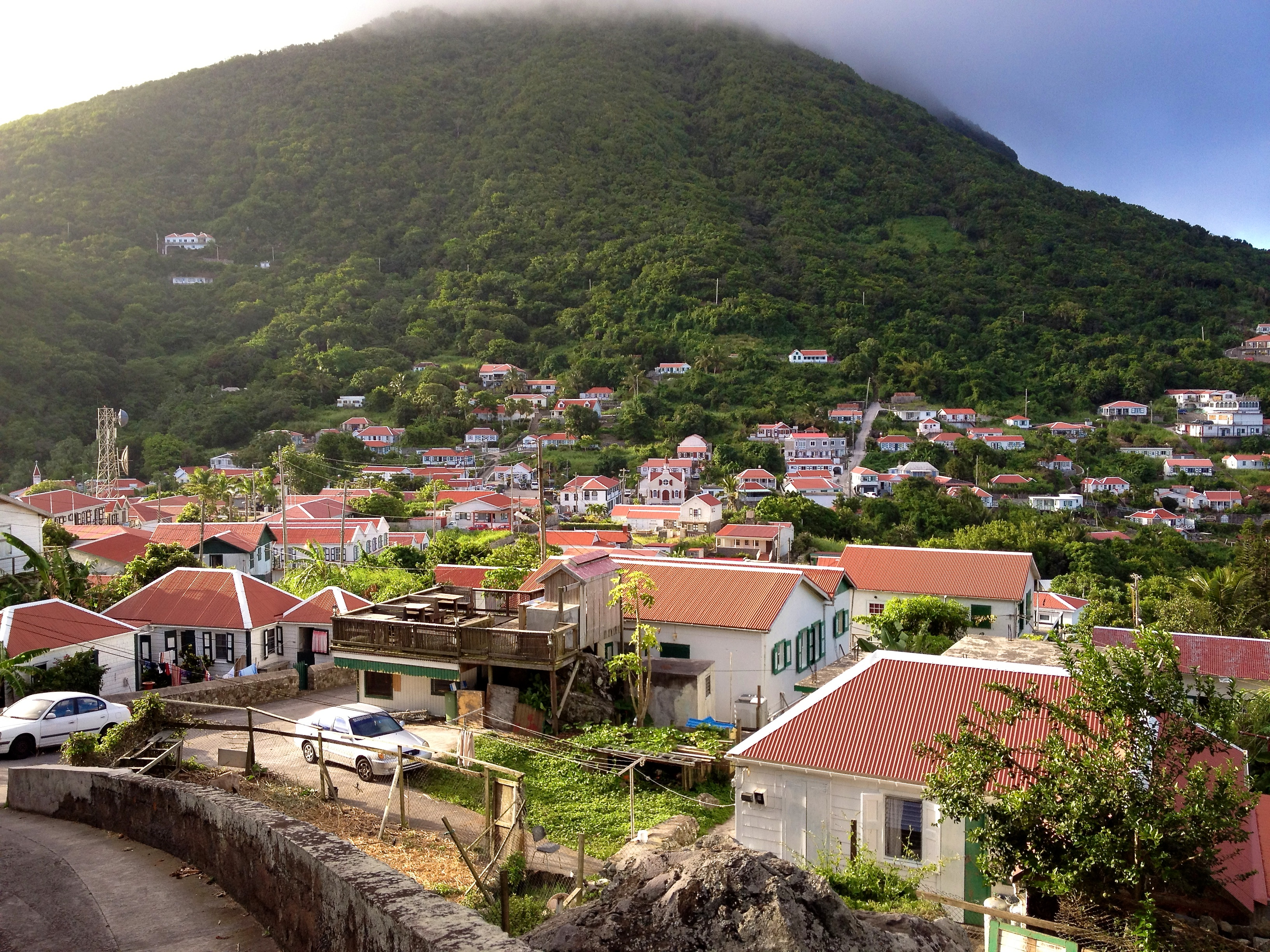
Windwardside, with Mount Scenery in the background

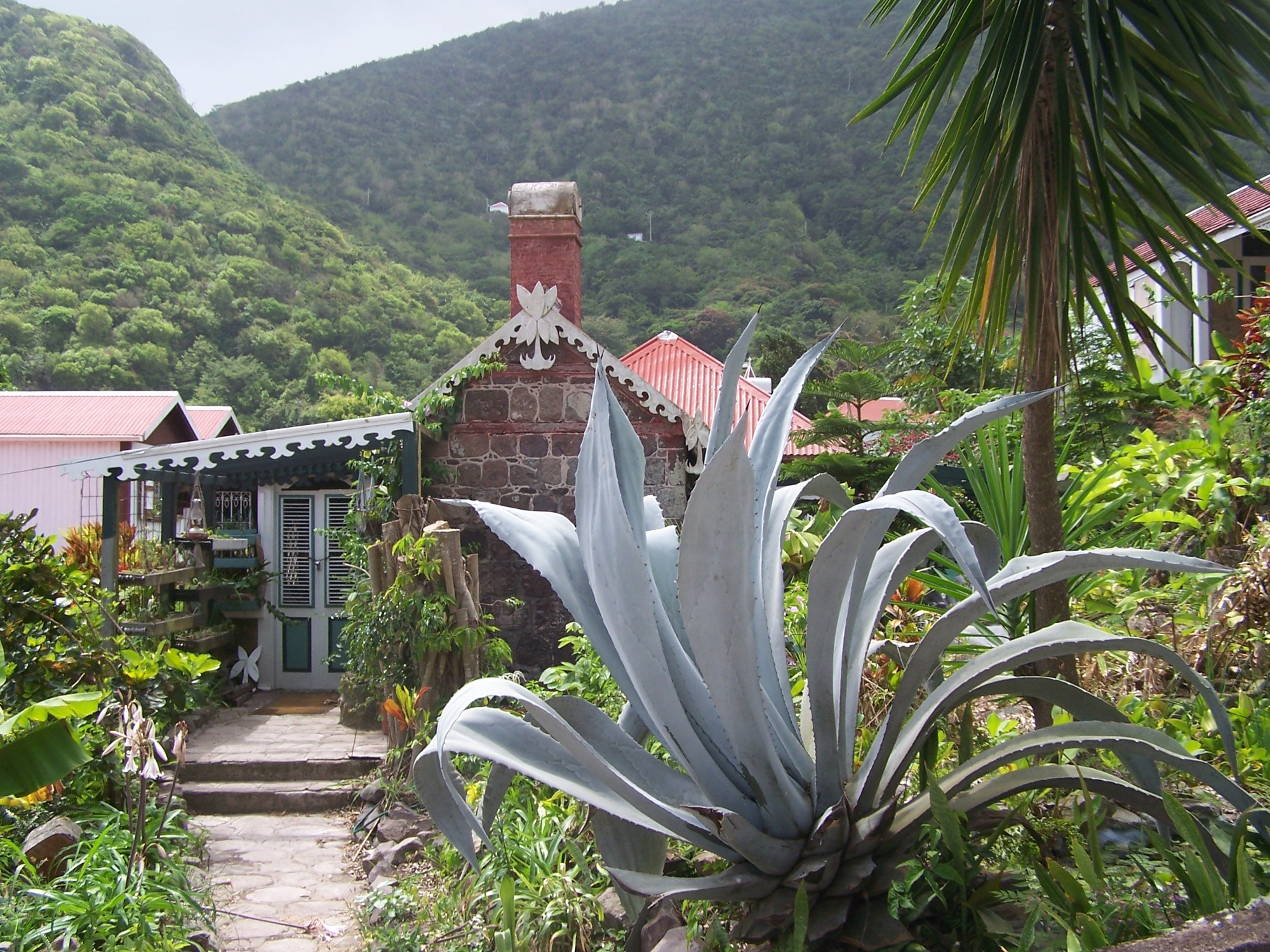
Cottage in Windwardside

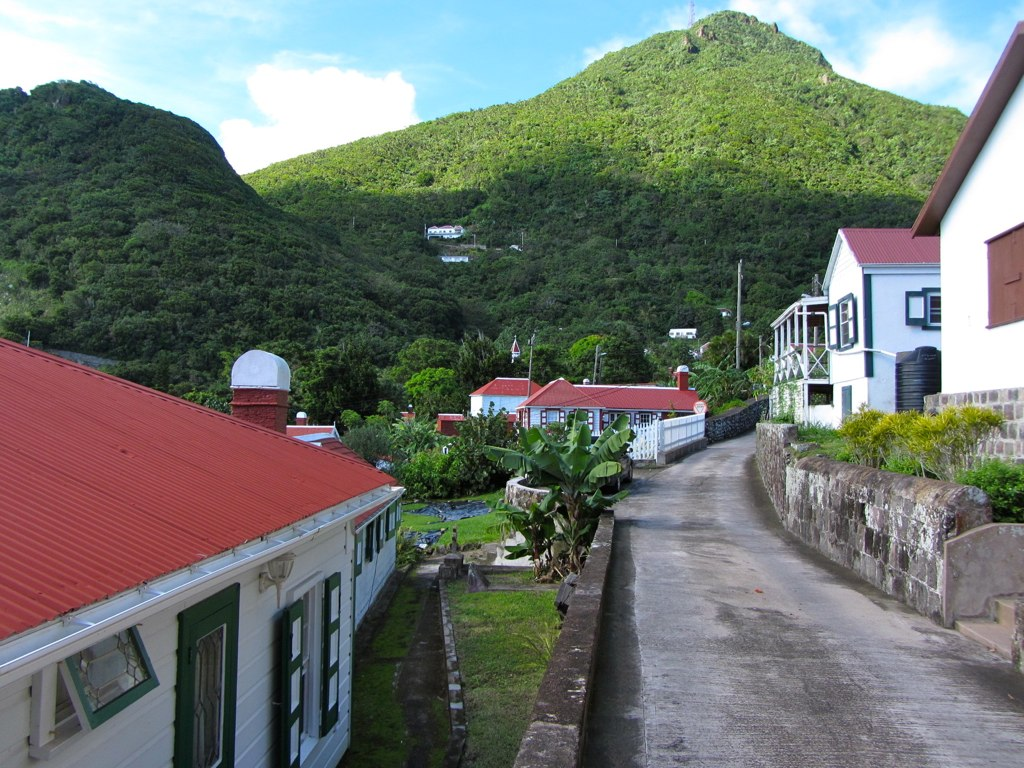
Side street in Windwardside

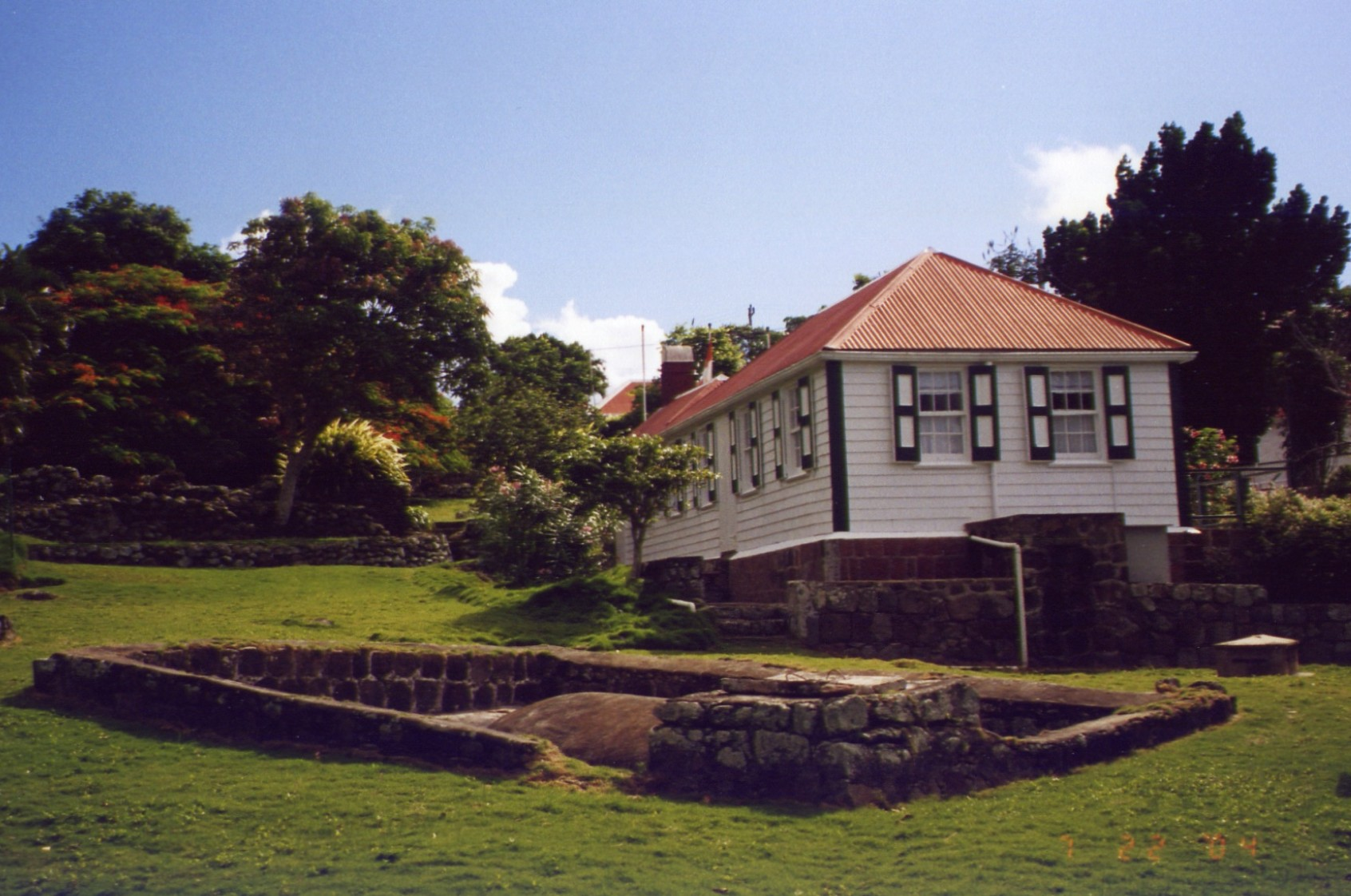
Harry L. Johnson Museum

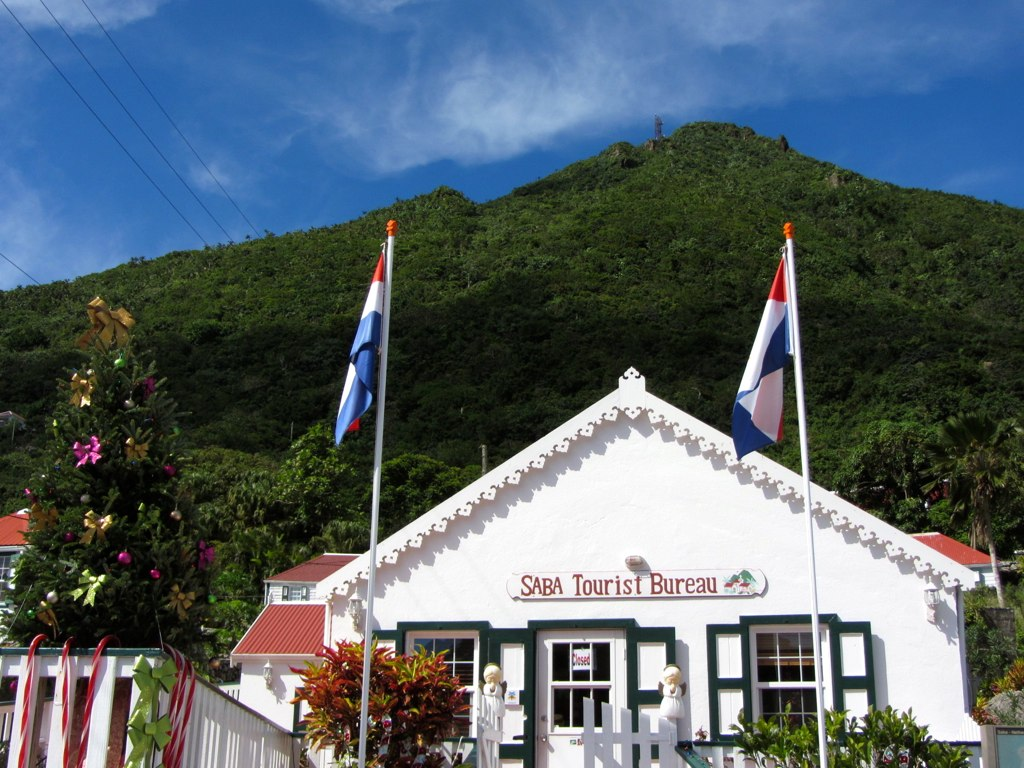
Saba Tourism Bureau, with Mount Scenery in the background

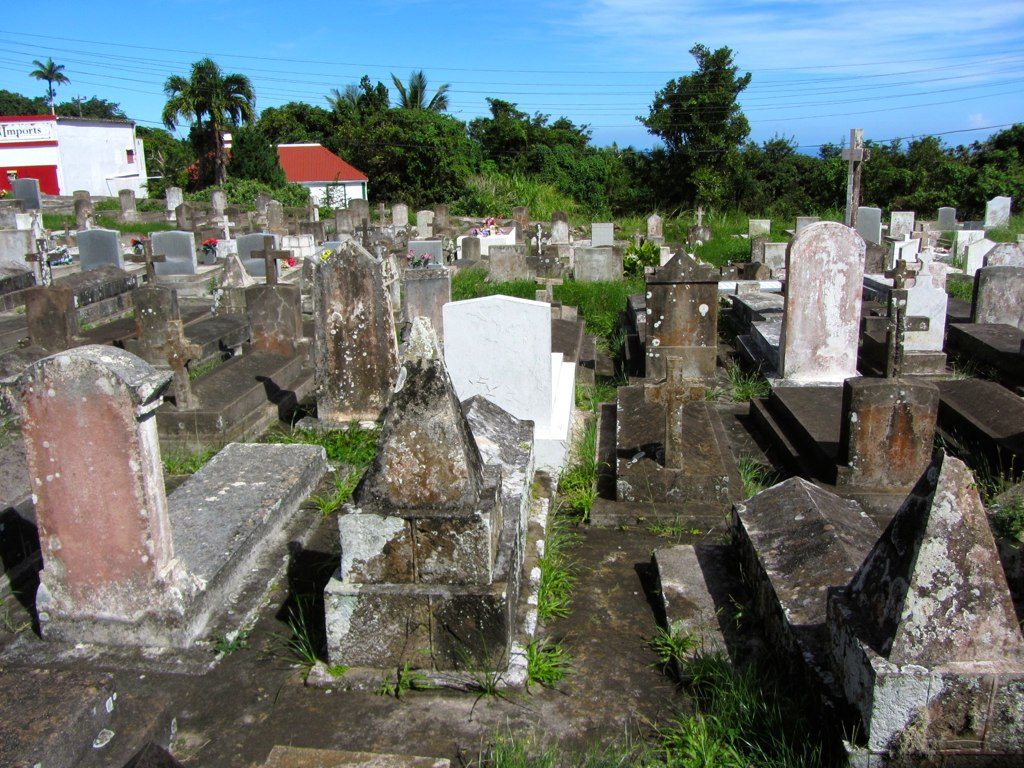
St. Paul's Cemetery

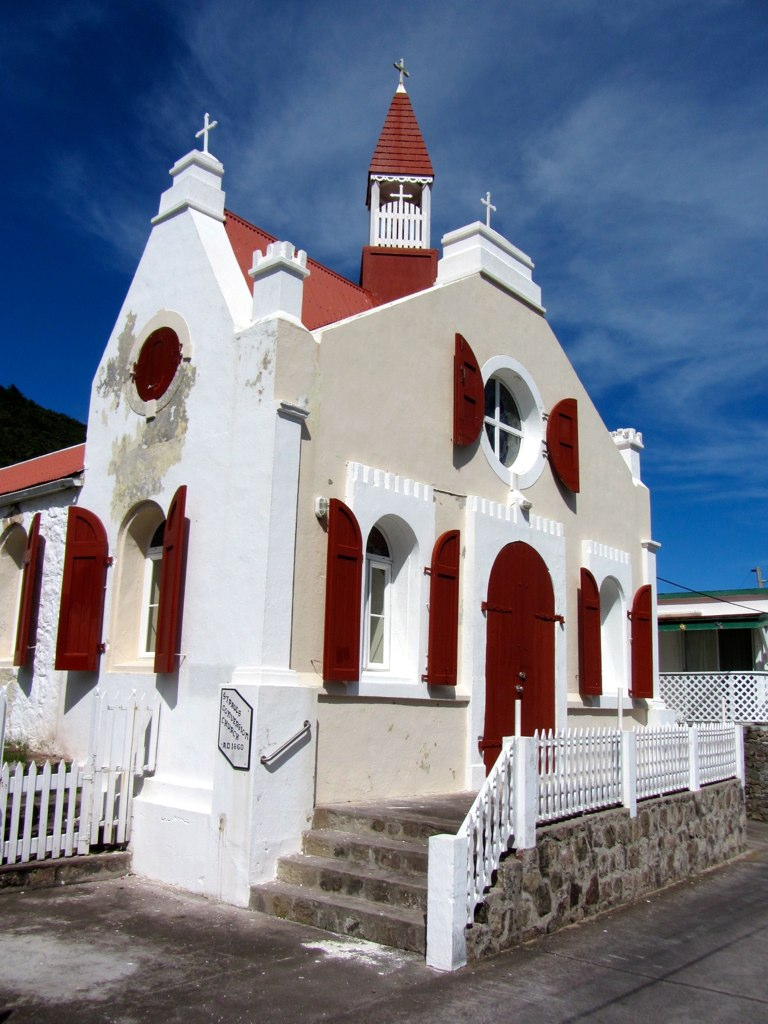
St. Paul's Church

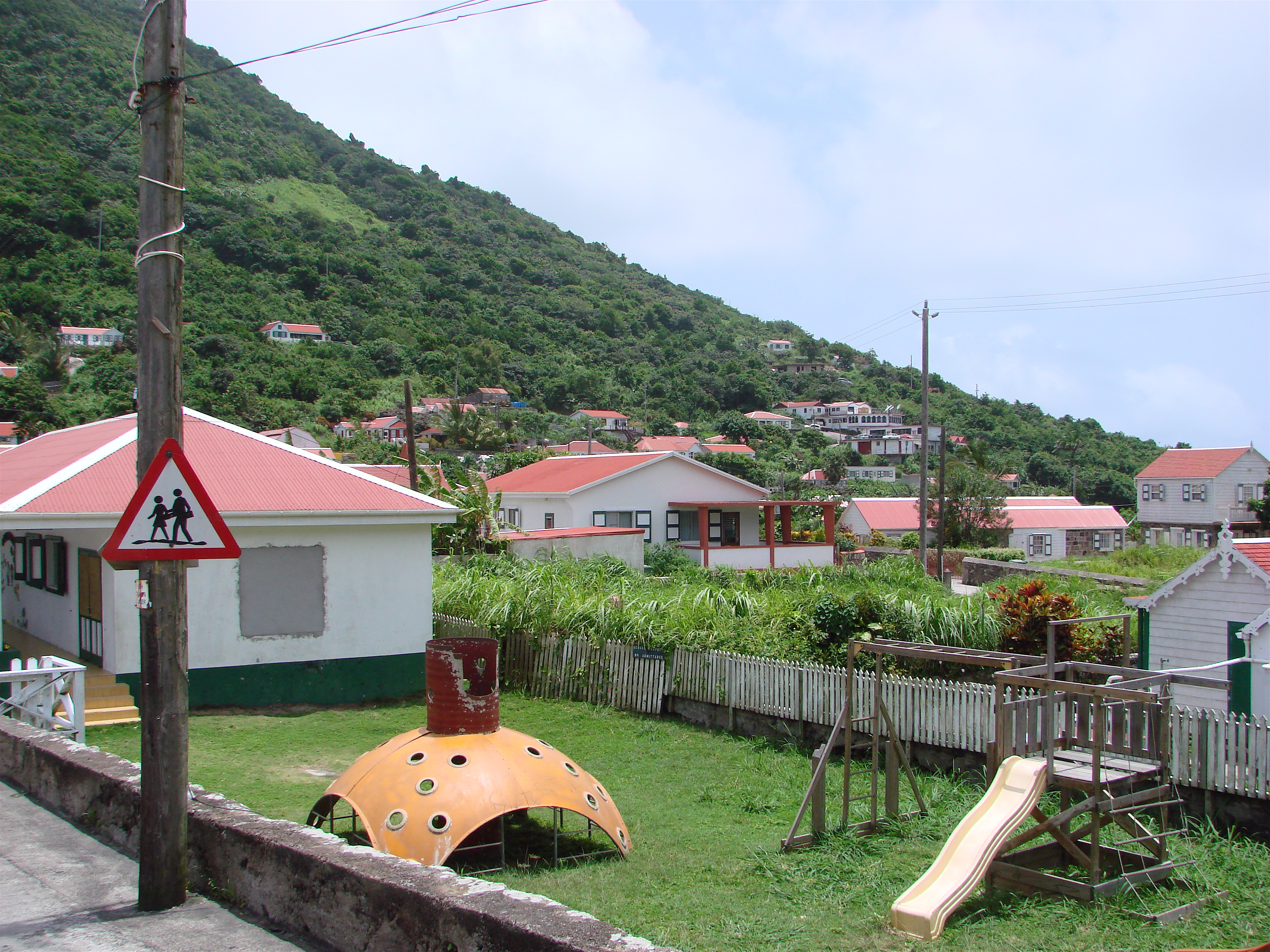
Playground in Windwardside

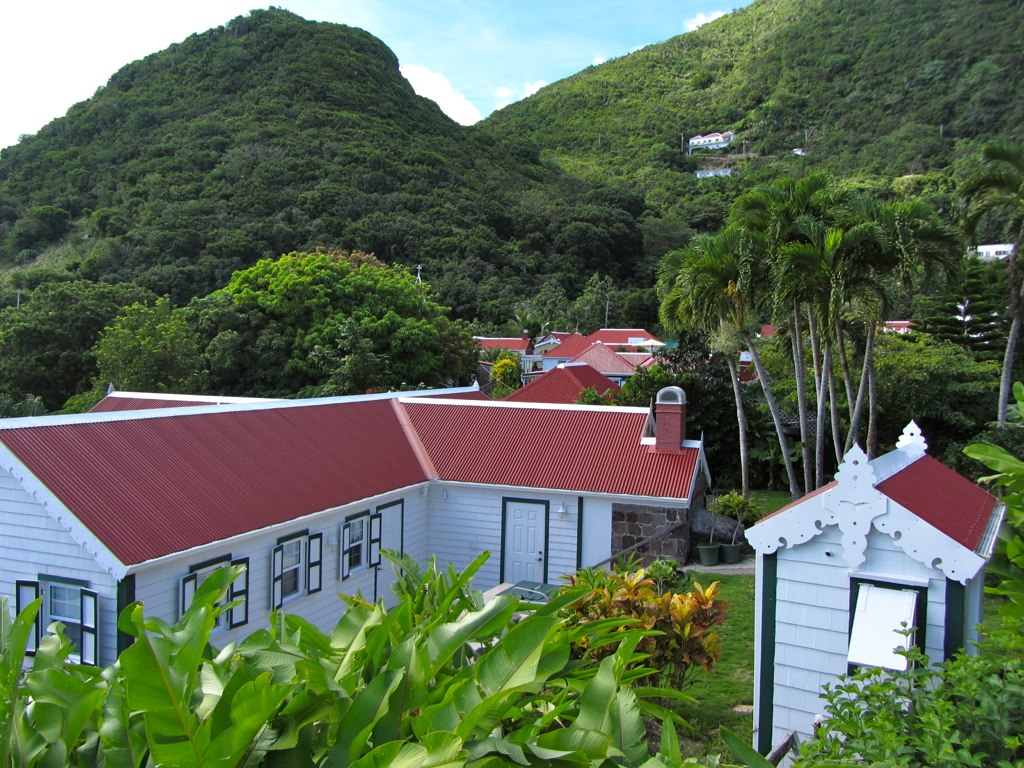
Cottages in Windwardside

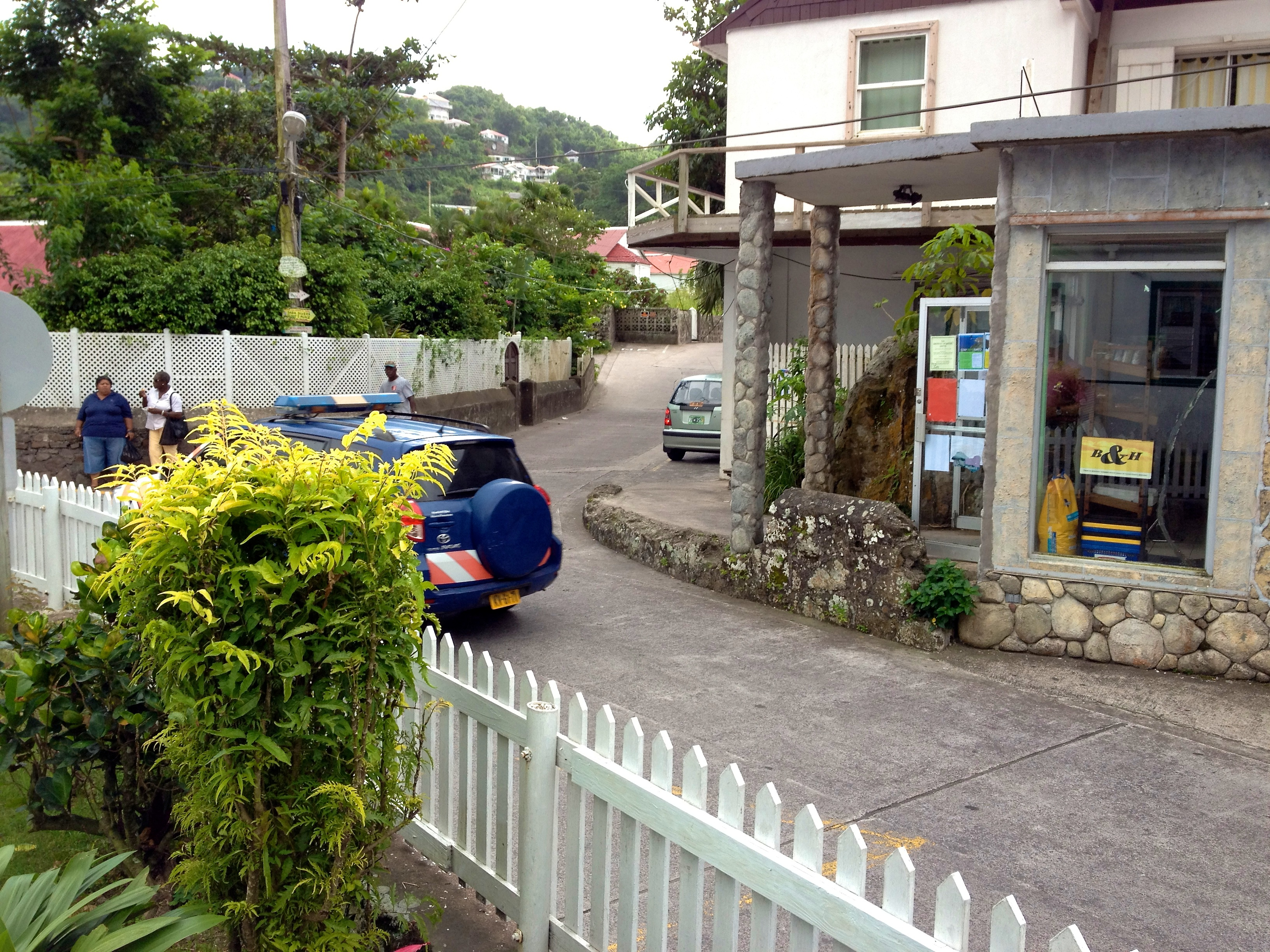
The Road going through Windwardside, past a grocery store

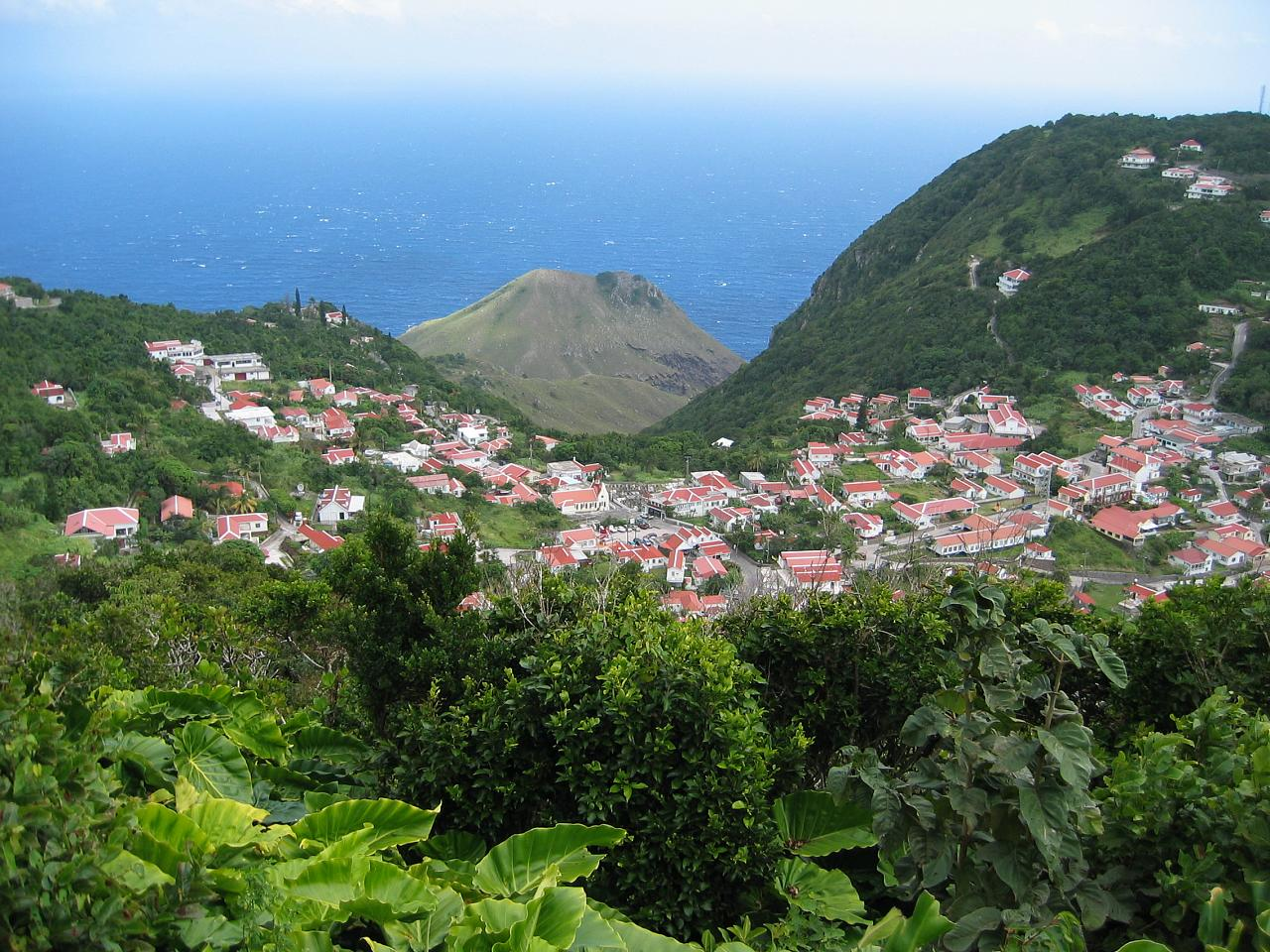
Windwardside, with Old Booby Hill in the background
