= Diocese of Kingstown =

Latin Catholic jurisdiction in the Caribbean

Coordinates: 13.1576°N 61.2289°W

Diocese of Kingstown Dioecesis Regalitana

Catholic
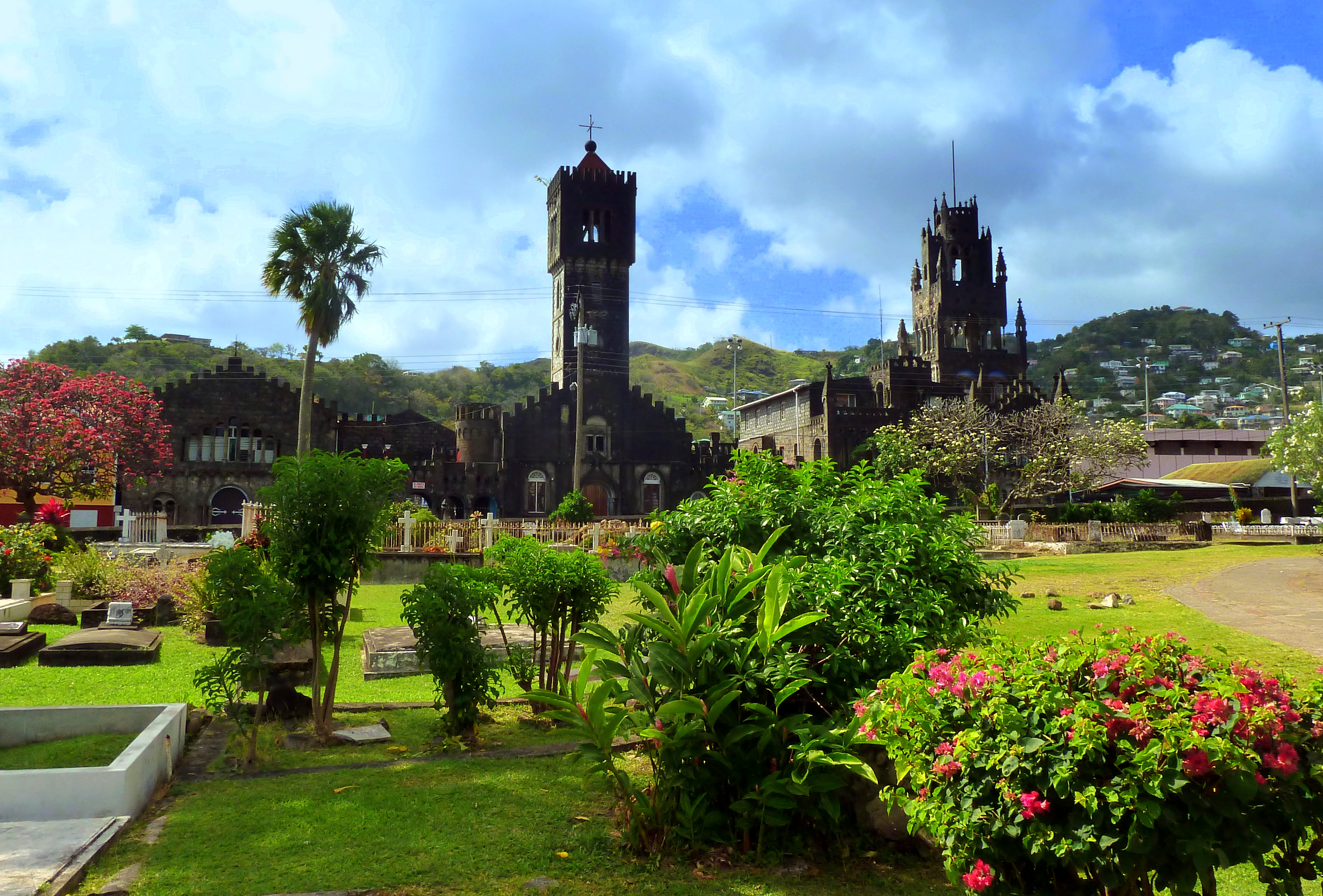
- Cathedral of the Assumption

- Coat of arms

Location
- Country: Saint Vincent and the Grenadines
- Ecclesiastical province: Castries
- Metropolitan: Castries

Statistics
- Area: 388 km^{2} (150 sq mi)
- Population: Total; Catholics: (as of 2006); 109,022; 8,176 (7.5%)
- Parishes: 6

Information
- Denomination: Catholic Church
- Sui iuris church: Latin Church
- Rite: Roman Rite
- Established: 23 October 1989 (36 years ago)
- Cathedral: Assumption Cathedral

Current leadership
- Pope: Leo XIV
- Bishop: Gerard County
- Metropolitan Archbishop: Robert Rivas

Website
- catholicsvg.org

The Roman Catholic Diocese of Kingstown (Latin: Dioecesis Regalitana) is a Latin Church ecclesiastical territory or diocese of the Catholic Church in the Caribbean. The diocese comprises the entirety of the nation of Saint Vincent and the Grenadines. The diocese is a suffragan diocese of the Archdiocese of Castries and a member of the Antilles Episcopal Conference.

== History ==
The Diocese of Kingstown was erected on 23 October 1989 by Pope John Paul II. It was formed by splitting the Diocese of Bridgetown-Kingstown into the dioceses of Kingstown and Bridgetown.

The cathedral of the diocese is the Cathedral of the Assumption in Kingstown. The diocese includes about 10,000 faithful, served by six parishes, five pre-schools, three primary schools, and two secondary schools.

The founding bishop was Robert Rivas, who served since the inception of the diocese to 2007 when he was appointed Coadjutor Archbishop of the Archdiocese of Castries. As of 19 July 2007 the See of Kingstown had been vacant until a new bishop, Charles Jason Gordon, was named by the Vatican on the 8 July 2011 at 6 a.m. St. Vincent & the Grenadines time. Archbishop Rivas had been appointed Apostolic Administrator until the appointment of a new bishop and had appointed as his delegate Fr. Pio Atonio M.F., who oversaw the everyday running of the diocese.

On July 8, 2011 Pope Benedict XVI appointed Charles Jason Gordon as Bishop of Kingstown (and at the same time as Bishop of Bridgetown, Barbados). In addition it was decreed that Kingstown switched its Metropolitan from the Archdiocese of Castries, Saint Lucia to the Archdiocese of Port of Spain, Trinidad and Tobago. With Bishop County's ordination this has been reversed.

== Ordinaries ==
- Robert Rivas, O.P. (23 October 1989 – 19 July 2007, appointed Coadjutor Archbishop of Castries)
- Charles Jason Gordon (8 July 2011 – 22 December 2015)
- Gerard County, C.S.Sp. (22 December 2015 – present)

== See also ==
- Roman Catholicism in Saint Vincent and the Grenadines
