= Diocese of Bridgetown =

Latin Catholic ecclesiastical jurisdiction in the Caribbean

Coordinates: 13.0918°N 59.6089°W

Diocese of Bridgetown Dioecesis Pontipolitana

Catholic
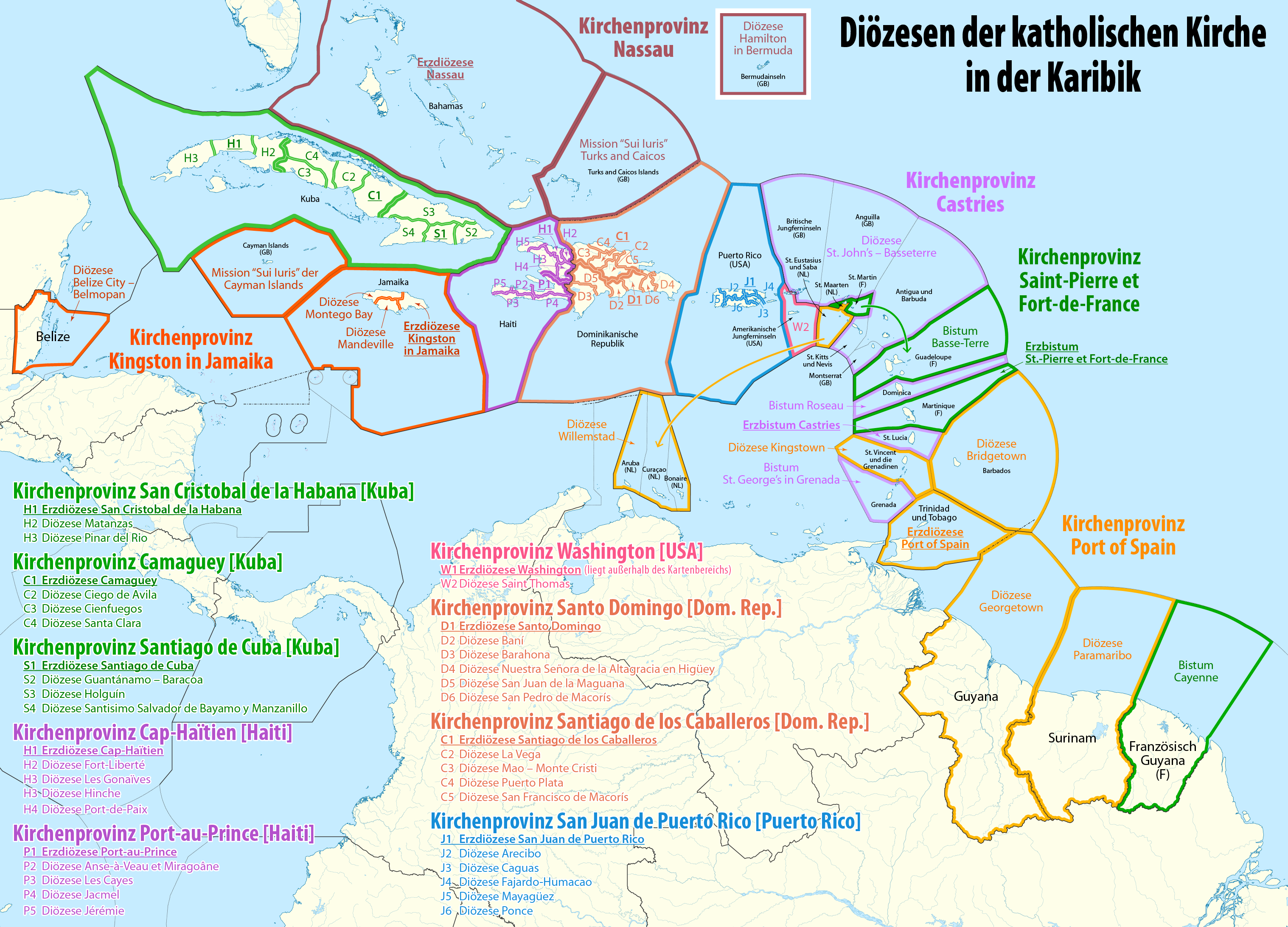

- Coat of arms

Location
- Country: Barbados
- Ecclesiastical province: Port of Spain
- Metropolitan: Port of Spain

Statistics
- Area: 430 km^{2} (170 sq mi)
- Population: Total; Catholics: (as of 2012); 277,000; 11,100 (4.0%)
- Parishes: 7

Information
- Rite: Roman Rite
- Cathedral: St. Patrick's Cathedral in Bridgetown

Current leadership
- Pope: Leo XIV
- Bishop: Neil Sebastian Scantlebury
- Metropolitan Archbishop: Charles Jason Gordon

Website
- Website of the Diocese

The Diocese of Bridgetown (Latin: Dioecesis Pontipolitana) is a diocese of the Latin Church of the Catholic Church in the Caribbean. The diocese encompasses the entirety of the former British dependency of Barbados. The diocese is a suffragan of the Archdiocese of Port of Spain, and a member of the Antilles Episcopal Conference.

Erected in 1970 as the Diocese of Bridgetown-Kingstown, the diocese was split on 23 October 1989 into the Diocese of Bridgetown and the Diocese of Kingstown. In September 2011, Father Jason Gordon was consecrated Bishop of this Diocese, after the retirement of Bishop Malcolm Galt in May 2005. Both Bishops Malcolm Galt and Jason Gordon are clergy native to Trinidad .

In 2009, the Mayor of the Irish city of Drogheda presented Father Harcourt Blackett with a scroll to commemorate the 360th anniversary of the deportation of Irish Catholics to Barbados. The Irish Catholic migrants formed the basis of the Catholic Church in Barbados. Historically the Church of England was the official state religion in the colony of Barbados, and the Irish Catholics that practiced their faith were forced to worship and practice their religion in caves in Barbados. Specifically Indian cave and Chapel cave both in the northern parts of Barbados have been identified as having been used as such. Father Blackett said he expected to receive more scrolls from other Irish cities which Barbados has a historic link including Wexford and Waterford. He also proposed the establishment of a shrine in the Caves in Barbados to remember those that worshiped there in the past.

== Ordinaries ==
- Anthony Hampden Dickson (19 October 1970 – 23 April 1995)
- Malcolm Patrick Galt, C.S.Sp. (23 April 1995 – 31 May 2005)
- Charles Jason Gordon (8 July 2011 – 19 October 2017), appointed Archbishop of Port of Spain, Trinidad and Tobago
- Neil Sebastian Scantlebury (28 Dec 2020 - )

== Notes ==
- http://www.catholic-hierarchy.org/diocese/dbrit.html
- http://www.barbados.org/churches/catholic.htm
