= Charles Jason Gordon =

Barbadian archbishop

The Most Reverend Charles Jason Gordon
- Metropolitan Archbishop of Port of Spain
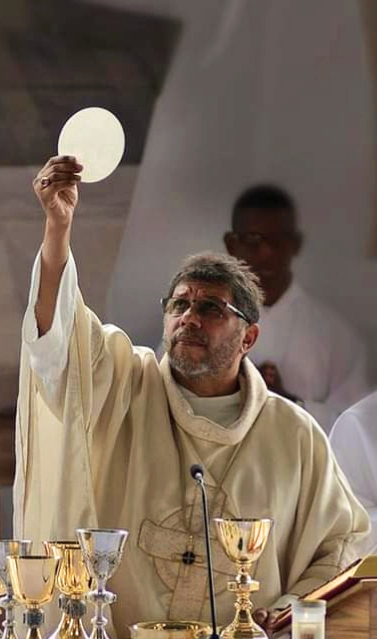
- Church: Roman Catholic Church
- Archdiocese: Port of Spain
- See: Port of Spain
- Appointed: 19 October 2017
- Predecessor: Joseph Everard Harris, CSSp
- Other posts: President of the Antilles Episcopal Conference (2023–); Member - Dicastery for Interreligious Dialogue (2025-); Apostolic Administrator of Willemstad (2025–)
- Previous posts: Bishop of Kingstown (2011–15); Bishop of Bridgetown (2011–17); Apostolic Administrator of Bridgetown (2017–20); Vice-President of the Antilles Episcopal Conference (2017–23)

Orders
- Ordination: 19 March 1991
- Consecration: 21 September 2011 by Joseph Everard Harris, CSSp

Personal details
- Born: Charles Jason Gordon; 17 March 1959 (age 67) Port of Spain, Trinidad and Tobago
- Motto: Totus Tuus
- Coat of arms

Styles of Charles Jason Gordon
- Reference style: The Most Reverend
- Spoken style: Your Grace
- Religious style: Archbishop

Charles Jason Gordon (born 17 March 1959) is a Trinidadian Roman Catholic prelate and the current Metropolitan Archbishop of Port of Spain since his appointment in 2017. He had served prior to this as a parish priest for the locality of Gonzales, approximately 1.9 km/1.2 miles outside Port of Spain, before serving as the bishop for both Bridgetown and Kingstown. Gordon is known for his opposition to death sentences and favours peacemaking and bridge building in local disputes and gang violence.

== Life ==
Charles Jason Gordon was born in Trinidad and Tobago on 17 March 1959. Gordon managed his father's failing business after his father died and managed to make it profitable all the while becoming involved in parish initiatives that led him to decide to enter the religious life. He had shown his engagement in projects teaching skills to displaced people with an emphasis on adolescents. He was ordained to the priesthood in 1991.

In the late 1980s (after selling the business in 1991) and into the 1990s he studied at Mount Saint Benedict and later at the Catholic University of Louvain in Belgium where he got his bachelor's and master's in theological studies before completing his doctorate in London. He later became involved in the Catholic Charismatic Renewal and was an active participant in their work.

In 2003, he was made the parish priest for Gonzales. He received some awards for his project to bring peace in the eastern part of Port of Spain through the participation of all the stakeholders (including the gangs and their leaders). He mediated between communities in conflict and improved the standing of the Church while saving lives at the same time which earned him praise from Cardinal Peter Turkson. He celebrated a television Mass once a week and this reached out to as much as 50 000 people per week. Pope Benedict XVI named him as a Monsignor in 2009.

In 2011 he was appointed the Bishop of Kingstown in Saint Vincent and Grenadines and as the Bishop of Bridgetown in Barbados. He received his episcopal consecration from Joseph Everard Harris with Robert Rivas and Malcolm Patrick Galt serving as the co-consecrators on 21 September 2011 which came two months following his appointment. His consecration was celebrated in a tent in front of the Bridgetown Cathedral. Pope Francis later accepted his resignation from Kingstown in 2015 but continued to serve in Bridgetown until the pope appointed him as the Metropolitan Archbishop of Port of Spain in his homeland on 19 October 2017. He was enthroned in his new archdiocese on 27 December 2017.

On an annual basis he embarks on a week-long retreat for silence and solitude.

== Positions ==
=== Capital punishment ===
Gordon opposes capital punishment, which he considers "state-sponsored murder". The bishop elaborated that "it's still murder" regardless of who perpetrates it and that "its escalating the violence" rather than focusing on stopping it. He also continued that "all people have human dignity ... that dignity does not go away when we do something really bad".
