= Castries (disambiguation) =

Castries is the capital and largest city in Saint Lucia.

Castries or de Castries may also refer to

- Castries, Hérault, a commune in France
- Château de Castries, a Hérault castle of the House of Castries
- Castries District, a Saint Lucia district containing Castries town
- Hôtel de Castries, a Paris mansion of the House of Castries
- House of Castries, a French noble family
- Province of Castries, a Roman Catholic province covering the archdiocese and its suffragan dioceses in nearby anglophone islands
- Castries River, a river in Castries District, Saint Lucia
- Roman Catholic Archdiocese of Castries, covering all of Saint Lucia

== See also ==
- De-Kastri, a rural locality in Khabarovsk Krai, Russia
- Duc de Castries (disambiguation)
