= Mosson =

Mosson may refer to:

- Mosson, Côte-d'Or, a commune of Côte-d'Or département, France

La Mosson may refer to:

- La Mosson (neighbourhood), one of the seven neighbourhoods of Montpellier, France
- La Mosson (river), a tributary of the Lez river in Hérault département, France
- Château de la Mosson or Château de Bonnier de la Mosson, one of the Montpellier follies built in 1723 by Jean Giral
- Stade de la Mosson, a stadium in Montpellier, France
