= Charles Eugène Gabriel de La Croix =

French military officer and politician

Charles Eugène Gabriel de La Croix, marquis de Castries
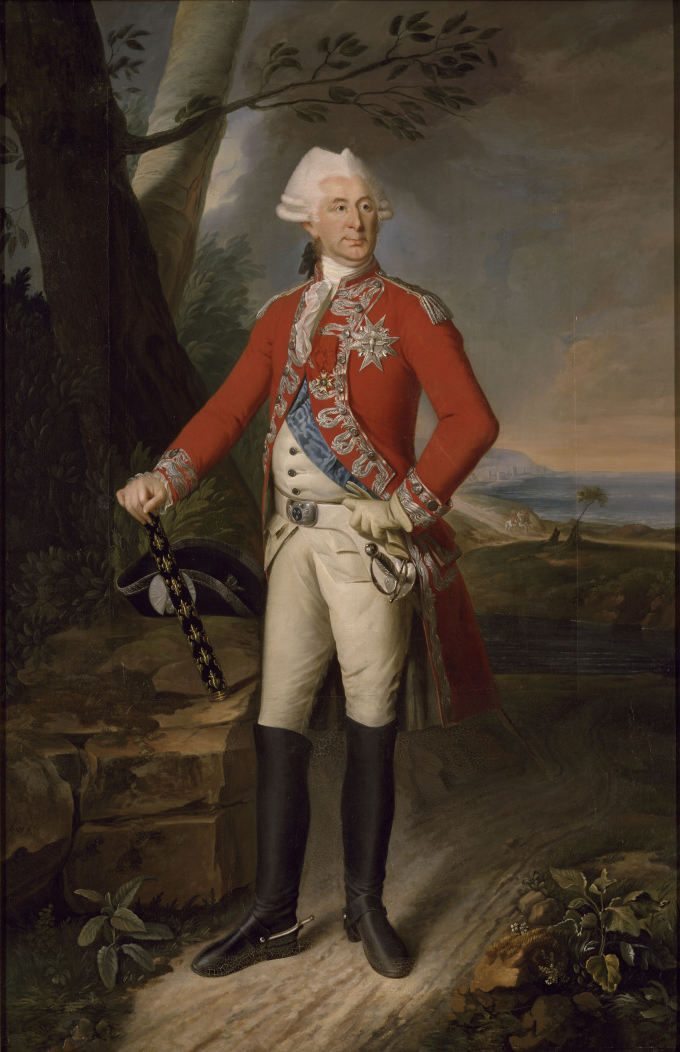
- Portrait by Joseph Boze
- Born: 25 February 1727; Paris, France
- Died: 11 January 1801 (aged 73); Wolfenbüttel, Electorate of Saxony
- Military career
- Allegiance: France
- Branch: French Royal Army; French Navy
- Service years: 1739–1789
- Rank: Marshal of France
- Other work: Secretary of State of the Navy

Charles Eugène Gabriel de La Croix de Castries (French pronunciation: [ʃaʁl øʒɛn ɡabʁijɛl də la kʁwa də kastʁi]) (25 February 1727 – 11 January 1801) was a French military officer and politician. He was the son of Joseph François de La Croix de Castries, marquis de Castries, and his second wife, Marie-Françoise de Lévis de Charlus.

== Military career ==
Entering the régiment du Roi-Infanterie in May 1739, he became a lieutenant on 23 August 1742. In parallel, he was lieutenant du Roi (king's lieutenant) in Languedoc and governor of Montpellier and Sète (from 1 December 1743). He fought with distinction in the Seven Years' War and all Louis XV's campaigns. "Mestre de camp" of the régiment du Roi-Cavalerie from 26 March 1744, he was maréchal de camp and commandant général of the cavalry from 1748.

In 1756, he commanded the expeditionary force sent to St Lucia, and the Carenage quarter of the island was renamed Castries after him. He next distinguished himself in the Battle of Rossbach (5 November 1757), in which he was wounded twice. Becoming lieutenant général (on 28 December 1758), he became maître de camp général of the cavalry on 16 April 1759. At the Battle of Clostercamp (16 October 1760), through his sang-froid he saved a situation when all seemed lost.

He was made knight of the Ordre du Saint-Esprit on 30 May 1762. Shortly after the peace of 1763, he was named governor of Flanders and Hainaut. Next, he was made capitaine lieutenant of the company of Gendarmes écossais and commandant of the Gendarmerie from 1770 until his retirement in 1788.

== Secretary of the Navy ==
He was named Secretary of State of the Navy on 13 October 1780 on the recommendation of his friend Jacques Necker. He remained in this post until 24 August 1787. In 1783, he was made a marshal of France. He reorganised the fleet and implemented a new naval strategy adopted by the Grand Conseil, namely that the French navy be redeployed to take into account the global nature of the conflict and fleets and squadrons be entrusted to more aggressive officers. This strategy that led to several French naval successes in the American War of Independence. He also made a very important legislative effort, simplifying the navy's hierarchy and reorganising its recruitment. de Castries deeply studied the dossiers sent him, and was highly energetic in these roles - hence his saying "I would like to sleep more quickly" ("Je voudrais dormir plus vite"). In politics, nevertheless, his views were rather conservative, if one judges by his "Réflexions sur l'esprit public", addressed to the King in 1785 - for him, monarchy's difficulties were summed up as a problem of authority; it was enough to show firmness and everything would be back in order.

== French Revolution ==
In 1787, he participated in the Assembly of Notables. On July 13, 1789, pressed to re-accept the ministry of the Navy by the king, he refused it. He emigrated on October 20 and took advantage of the hospitality of Jacques Necker at Coppet. In 1792, at the time of the Prussian invasion of the Champagne, he and the marshal of Broglie commanded a corps in the princes' army. He continued to serve as principal secretary to the count of Provence. He died in 1801 at the home of his old enemy Charles William Ferdinand, Duke of Brunswick, now his friend.

He possessed a property at Antony where Parc Heller now is, as well as a castle at Ollainville, which he enlarged in 1782. In Paris, he installed himself in the hôtel de Castries in 1743, at 72 rue de Varenne, and in 1761 redecorated it out of a large inheritance from his uncle, the marshal of Belle-Isle.

In November 1790 he fought a duel with Charles de Lameth.

== Descendants ==
On 19 December 1743, he married Gabrielle Isabeau Thérèse de Rozet de Rocozel de Fleury, daughter of the duc de Fleury, and they had two children:

- Charles de La Croix de Castries (1756–1842);
- Adélaïde Marie de La Croix de Castries, who married the vicomte de Mailly in 1767.

He showed himself an unfaithful husband, cheated frequently on his wife.

== See also ==
- Castries
- House of Castries

== Bibliography ==
- René de Castries, Le Maréchal de Castries, Paris, Flammarion, 1956.
