= Notre-Dame des Tables de Montpellier =

Basilica in Montpellier, France

Coordinates: 43.6122°N 3.8792°E

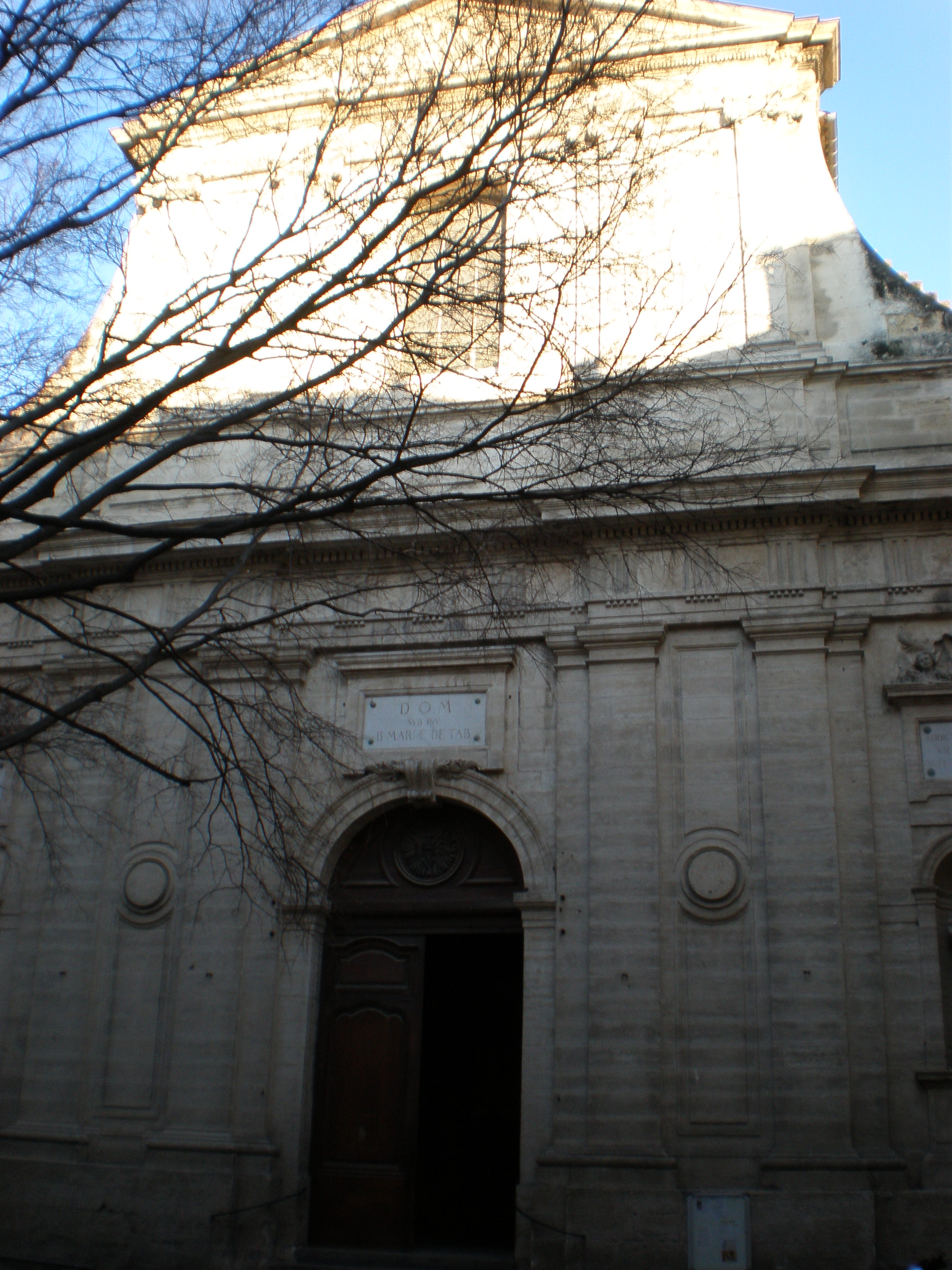
Facade of the Notre-Dame des Tables basilica in Montpellier

The original church of Notre Dame des Tables (also called Dama des Taoulas, whose name it received from the money-changing merchants of 12th century Montpellier) rested at the heart of the old village of Montpellier, in the current Occitanie région of France. It was consecrated by Bishop Ricuin circa 817.

It was destroyed at the end of the 16th century as a result of the French wars of religion, and later became a stopping point for pilgrims to pray at on their way to Santiago de Compostela. Now, in its crypt — a remainder from the previous church — lies an exhibition about the history of Montpellier. The Hotel de Varennes in Montpellier houses sacred chapters of the baroque church.

== See also ==
- Antoine Ranc
- Élisabeth Bouissonade
- List of basilicas
- Maguelone Cathedral
- Villeneuve-lès-Maguelone
- List of Jesuit sites
