= Duc de Castries =

Duc de Castries, French for Duke of Castries, may refer to:

- House of Castries, which held the title from 1784 to 1886
- René de La Croix de Castries (1908–1986), a member of the family best known under the pen name and courtesy title Duc de Castries
