= Jean Giral =

French architect

Jean Antoine Giral (1700–1787) was an 18th-century French architect from Montpellier. He designed a number of buildings and structures in this city.

== Works ==
- 1715 Château de la Mogère, Montpellier
- 1723 Hôtel de Cambacérès, Montpellier
- 1723 Château de Bonnier de la Mosson, Montpellier
- 1732 Hôtel Allut, Montpellier
- 1739 Collégiale Saint-Jean, Pézenas
- 1746 Saint Charles Hospital, Montpellier. Demolished in 1932.
- 1747 Market Hall on the Place des Castellane, Montpellier. Demolished in 1858.
- 1747 Hôtel St-Côme, Montpellier
- 1748 Church of Notre-Dame-des-Tables, Montpellier
- 1750 Facade of the Château de Castries, Castries
- 1750 Hôtel-Dieu Saint-Eloi, Montpellier
- 1754 Château de Cassan, Roujan
- 1757 Hôtel Haguenot, Montpellier
- 1767 Bridge in Villeneuve-lès-Maguelone
- 1768 Promenade and Pavillon du Peyrou, Montpellier
- 1772 Aqueduc Saint-Clément, Montpellier
- 1776 Hôtel de Guilleminet, Montpellier
