= Château de la Mogère =

Mansion near Montpellier, France

Coordinates: 43°36′01.90″N 3°55′33.46″E

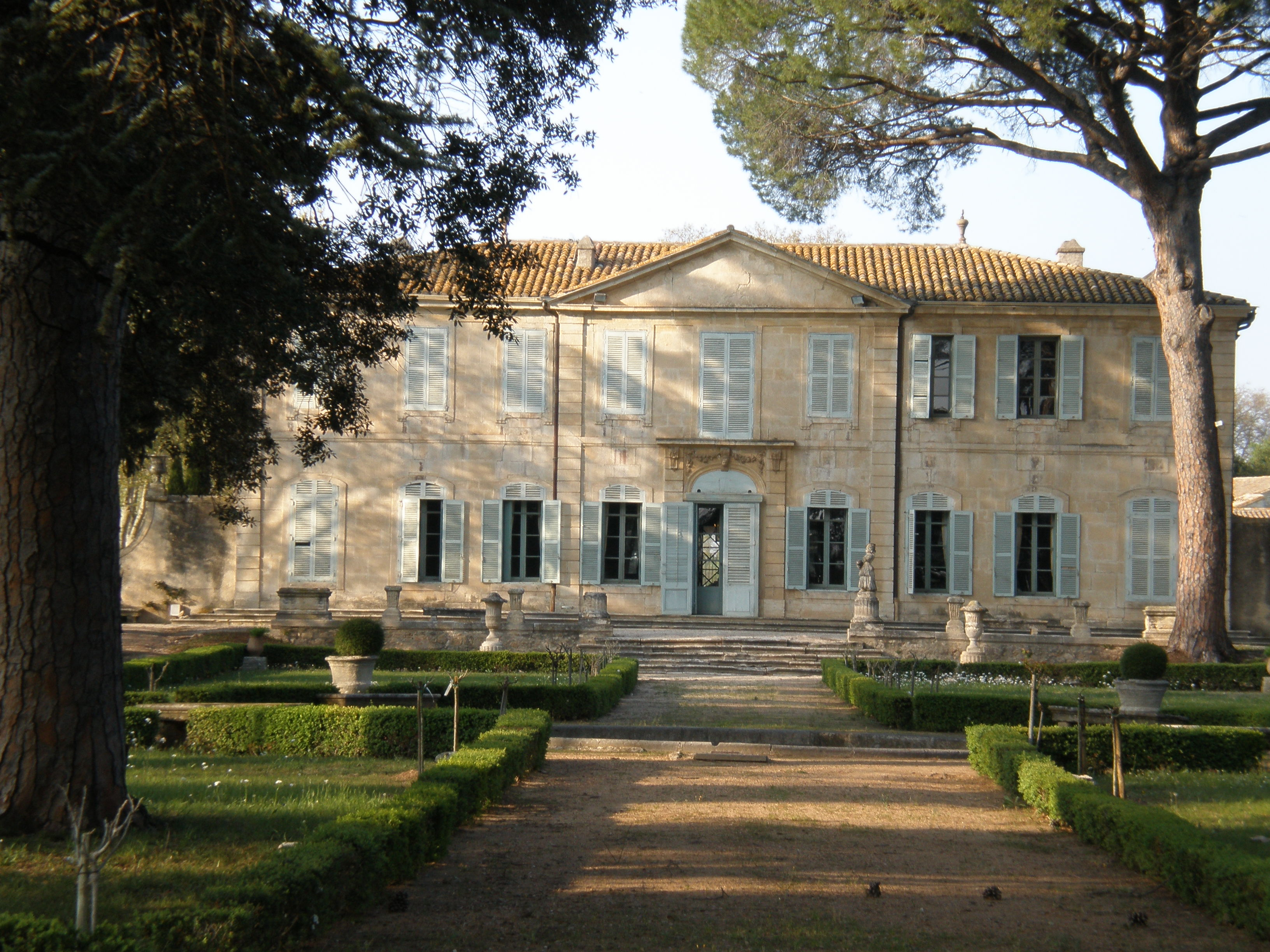
The Château de la Mogère

The Château de la Mogère is a mansion near the city of Montpellier in the French region of Occitanie. It is one of many folies (country houses) on the outskirts of Montpellier, built by wealthy merchants in the 18th century.

In 1706, the grounds of la Mogère were purchased by Fulcran Limouzin, the local Secrétaire d'État à la Maison du Roi (one of the types of Secretary of State in France's Ancien Régime). In 1715, architect Jean Giral drew the plan for La Mogère, giving it the appearance it still has today.

Its harmonious façade is topped off by a pediment, standing against a background of pine trees, all in Renaissance-style.

The grounds and interior, currently owned by the Viscount Gaston de Saporta, are open for visits. The interior has been kept intact since the 18th century, displaying antique furniture and family portraits from the last three centuries. Amongst the painters represented here are Jean Jouvenet, Hyacinthe Rigaud and Jacques-Louis David.

The garden is a mixture of English garden and formal garden style and houses a large fountain built up out of thousands of little seashells and carrying a number of cherubs.

La Mogère nowadays lies right next to the Autoroute A9 and near the Montpellier - Méditerranée Airport and Montpellier-Sud de France station. The last stop of the Montpellier tramway line 1 (Odysseum) is a 10-minute walk away. The Château de Flaugergues is also nearby.
