= Montpellier folies =

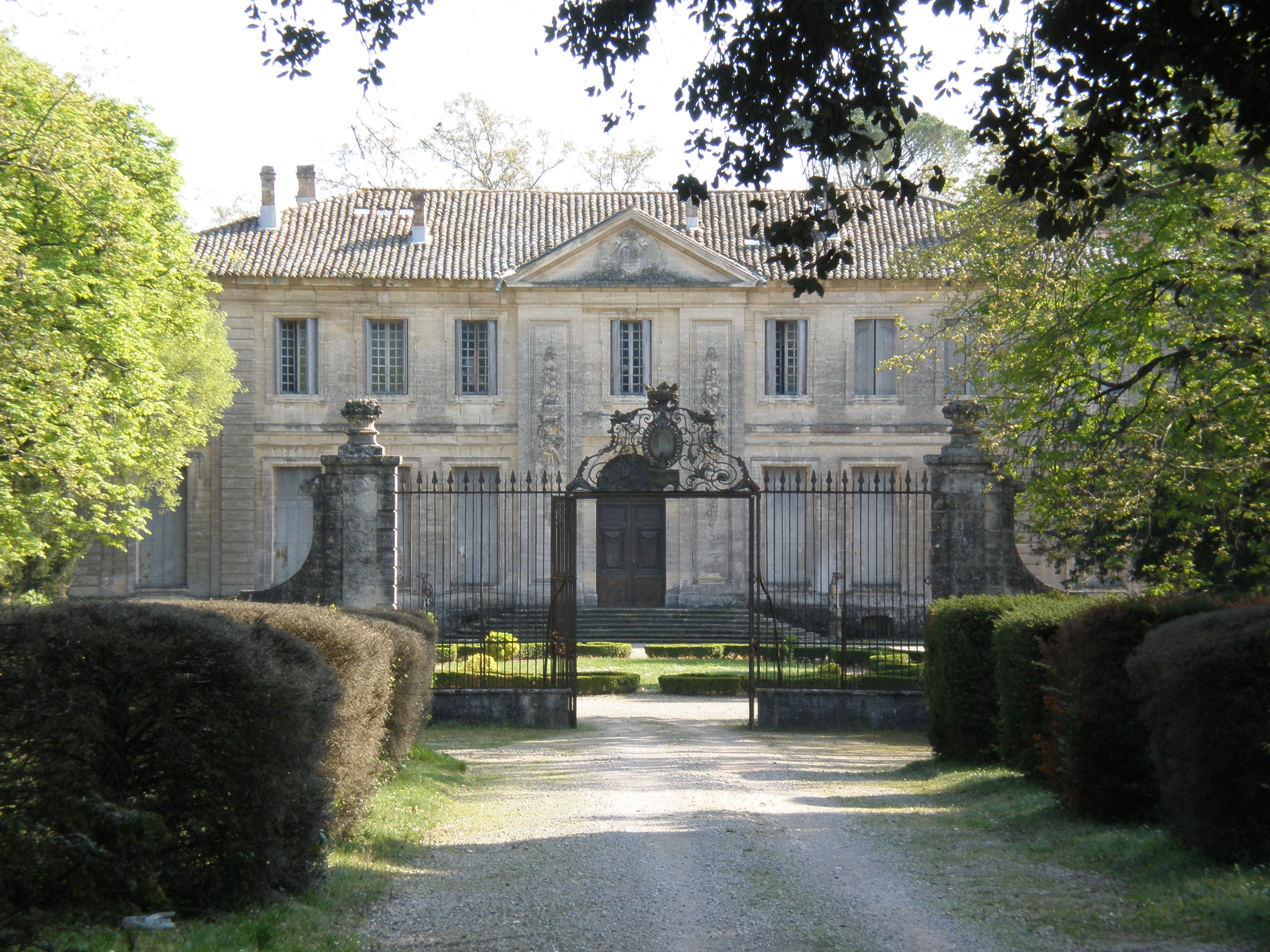
Le Château de la Piscine (Montpellier, Hérault 34).

The folies of the French city of Montpellier are a number of châteaux on the outskirts of the city. Comparable to English country houses rather than follies in the usual sense of the term, they were built by the wealthy as summer residences from the 18th century onwards. Some of them had and still have their own vineyards and produce their own wines. Jean Giral and Charles Gabriel Leblanc were amongst the architects hired by the merchants.

The folies are the visible proof of the wealth of the region in the 18th century. Most of them are built in Renaissance style, with decorative gardens surrounding them. These gardens are in various styles, both French and Italianate as well as those designed in a 'natural' way, in a style resembling but pre-dating English garden style.

The folies are owned by wealthy families, and some of them still make wine (especially Flaugergues). Initially built as country houses outside the city, today they are mostly surrounded by suburbs, highways, outlet stores and the like. Below is a list of the chateaux:

- Château de Flaugergues 43°36′37.08″N 3°55′12.15″E
- Château de la Mogère43°36′2″N 3°55′33″E
- Château d'O 43°38′00″N 3°50′21″E
- Château de la Mosson 43°36′49″N 3°49′09″E
- Château de l'Engarran
