= Château d'O =

Coordinates: 43°38′00″N 3°50′21″E

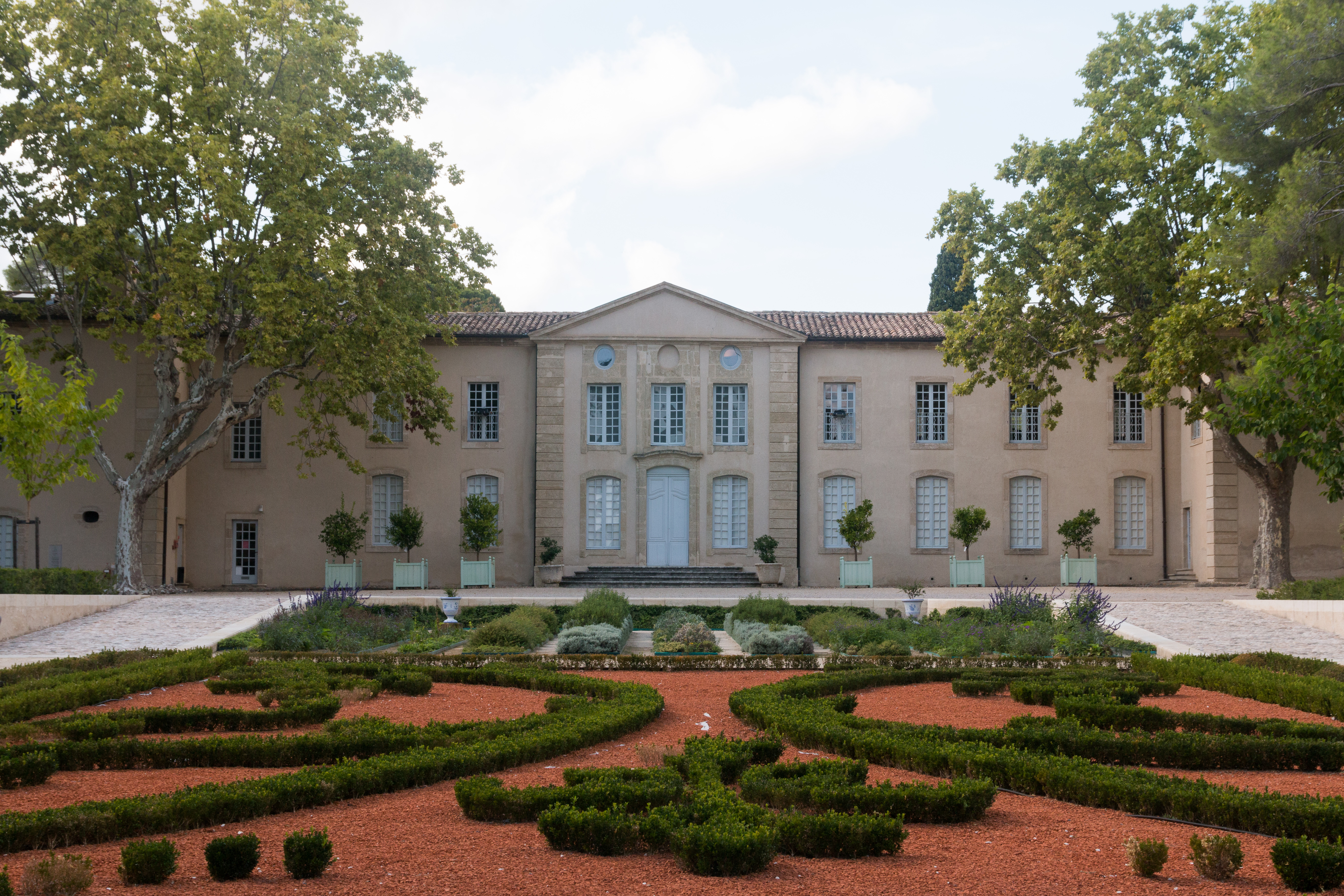
Château d'O from South entrance

Château d'O (English: Castle of O), also known as Domaine d'O, is one of the chateaux, old country mansions or follies, built by wealthy merchants, from the 18th century onwards, surrounding the French city of Montpellier.

The South entrance leads to the 18th century mansion, while North entrance leads to modern buildings, with Théâtre Jean-Claude Carrière.

It is now a main sight of the city of Montpellier. Part of the venue are :

- the château d'O itself, with its French formal gardens
- the Théâtre d'O, open-sky in the green theatre
- the Bassin d'O, the pond

== See also ==
- Water tower (in French château d'eau, an expression which sounds the same as Château d'O)
- Montpellier follies
- Aqueduc Saint-Clément, near Domaine du Château d'O
