= Villeneuve-lès-Maguelone station =

Railway station in Villeneuve-lès-Maguelone, France

Villeneuve-lès-Maguelone
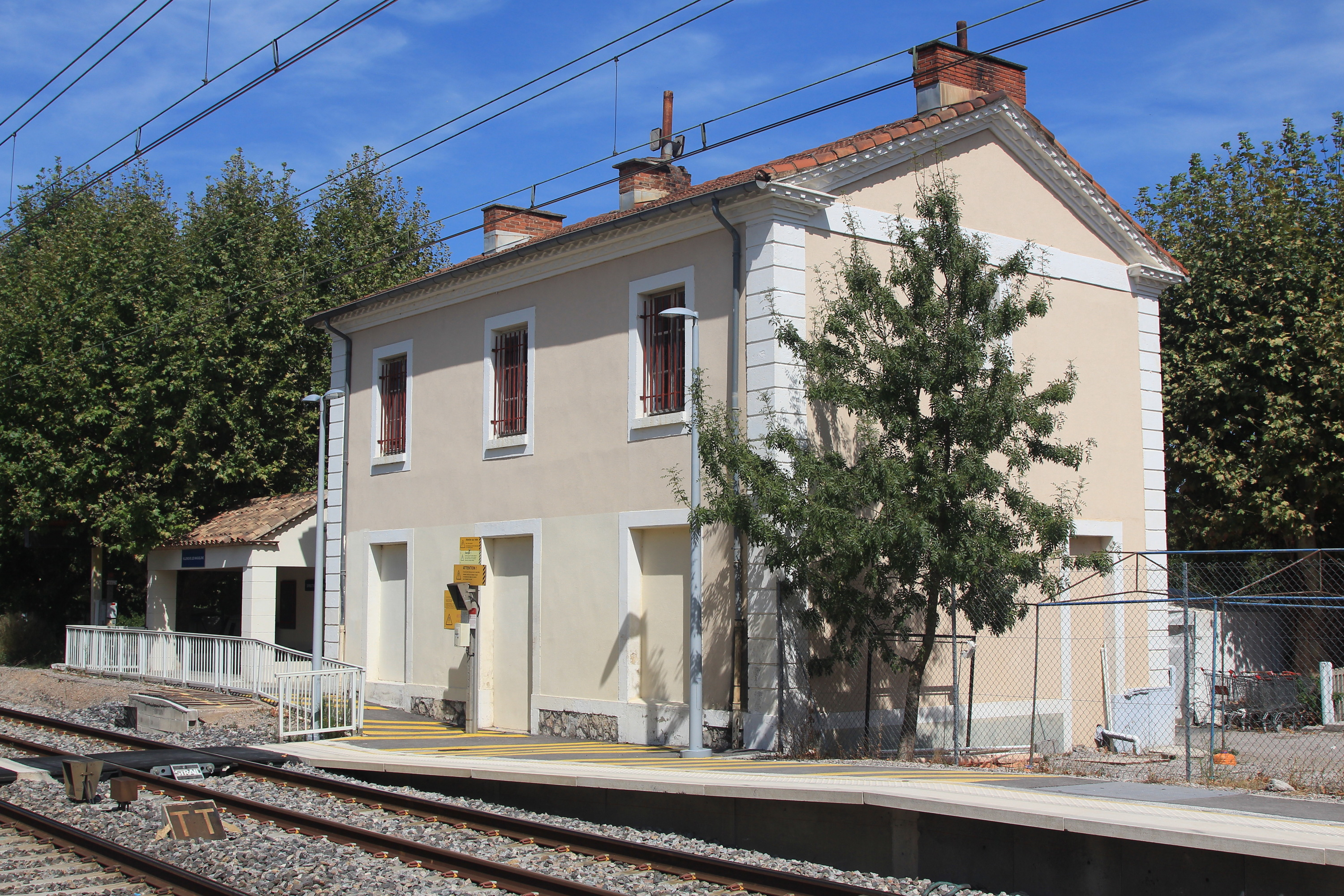
- Gare de Villeneuve-lès-Maguelone

General information
- Location: Villeneuve-lès-Maguelone, Occitanie, France
- Coordinates: 43.54372°N 3.84986°E
- Line: Tarascon–Sète railway

Other information
- Station code: 87773515

Services
Preceding station	TER Occitanie	Following station
Vic–Mireval towards Narbonne	21	Montpellier towards Avignon-Centre
Location

Villeneuve-lès-Maguelone is a railway station in Villeneuve-lès-Maguelone, Occitanie, southern France. Within TER Occitanie, it is part of line 21 (Narbonne–Avignon).
