= Élisabeth Bouissonade =

French tax revolt leader (died 1647)

Élisabeth Bouissonade (died 9 March 1647) led a women's uprising in Montpellier, France, in the 17th century in a revolt against a tax and the way it was rumored to be borne by women with children. As punishment, by the King's order, she was hanged in the public square in front of Notre-Dame-des-Tables, the main church of the city.

== Biography ==
Élisabeth Bouissonade was a single woman of unknown origin who lived in Montpellier and had no children. It appears she was a servant.

=== Context ===
The most frequently cited reason for the revolt was an extraordinary tax that was levied in 1643 on the occasion of Louis XIV's coronation, specifically "for the happy event of His Majesty's birth to the crown." This was an additional tax for the townspeople, who became angry at the tax's significant size and its unfairness because it disproportionately targeted artisans and domestic servants, who were people of scant means. In addition, a rumor was started by the artisans, saying that the tax targeted women and would be proportional to the number of children they had, and that it would be made permanent. One historian, Jean-Luc Laffont, suggests that women were encouraged to revolt by their artisan husbands and were aware of the magistrates' reluctance to intervene during popular uprisings. The women believed they could get away with less severe punishments than rebellious men. The people's anger over the ever-increasing tax burden centered on the tax collectors (sometimes called tax farmers).

=== Revolt ===
In Montpellier, Élisabeth Bouissonade led a crowd of 400 to 500 women of "low social standing" in protest on 29 June 1645. She is described by a nickname "La Branlaïre" ("the Shaker") and was described by Aigrefeuille "as a tall woman with a resolute expression, perfectly suited to increase the rebellion." He goes on to say, "She declared forcefully that those who deprived them and their children of food should be exterminated; and immediately they ran to all the places where they thought they might find supporters."

The women, later joined by their husbands, raged through the city against the highly unpopular "partisans" or tax farmers who were responsible for collecting taxes. The crowd burned the papers, furniture, carriages and houses of the tax collectors. The revolt continued for four days and on 2 July 1645 it took a decisive turn with the deaths of two passersby in the street in front of the homes of Eudes Massia (who was treasurer of the stock exchange and father of the receiver general of finances) and Jean Dupuy (clerk in charge of "collecting taxes levied for the happy event of His Majesty's birth to the crown"). City troops fired on the crowd, but the men rallied the women and faced down the soldiers, who then retreated to the local citadel for safety. Three thousand people barricaded the city's narrow streets. Throughout the course of the riot, about twenty people on both sides of the conflict were killed.

=== Executions ===
In 1647, King Louis XIV, who was only a child, granted a pardon to most of the participants, but he excluded Élisabeth Bouissonade and Marie Chassarde, who were each accused of leading the revolt. Both were hanged in the Montpellier public square (on the current Place Jean Jaurès) on 9 March 1647. Because they had asked to be buried in a Christian grave, both were interred in the ruins of the Church of Saint-Firmin.

The execution of the two women was intended to serve as an example. Because Élisabeth Bouissonade was an unknown woman, a stranger to the city, and single, "La Branlaïre" was the ideal victim: her condemnation was intended to inspire fear among the townspeople while avoiding the risk of reigniting the revolt among the people of Montpellier.

Although her identity and origins remain unknown, historian Maguelone Nouvel-Kirschléger considers her an "incarnation of popular female heroism."

=== Legacy ===
- A women's shelter bears her name: the Centre Elisabeth Bouissonnade (sic) in Montpellier. It is one of the first refuges in the country that welcomes women and their children who are victims of domestic violence.
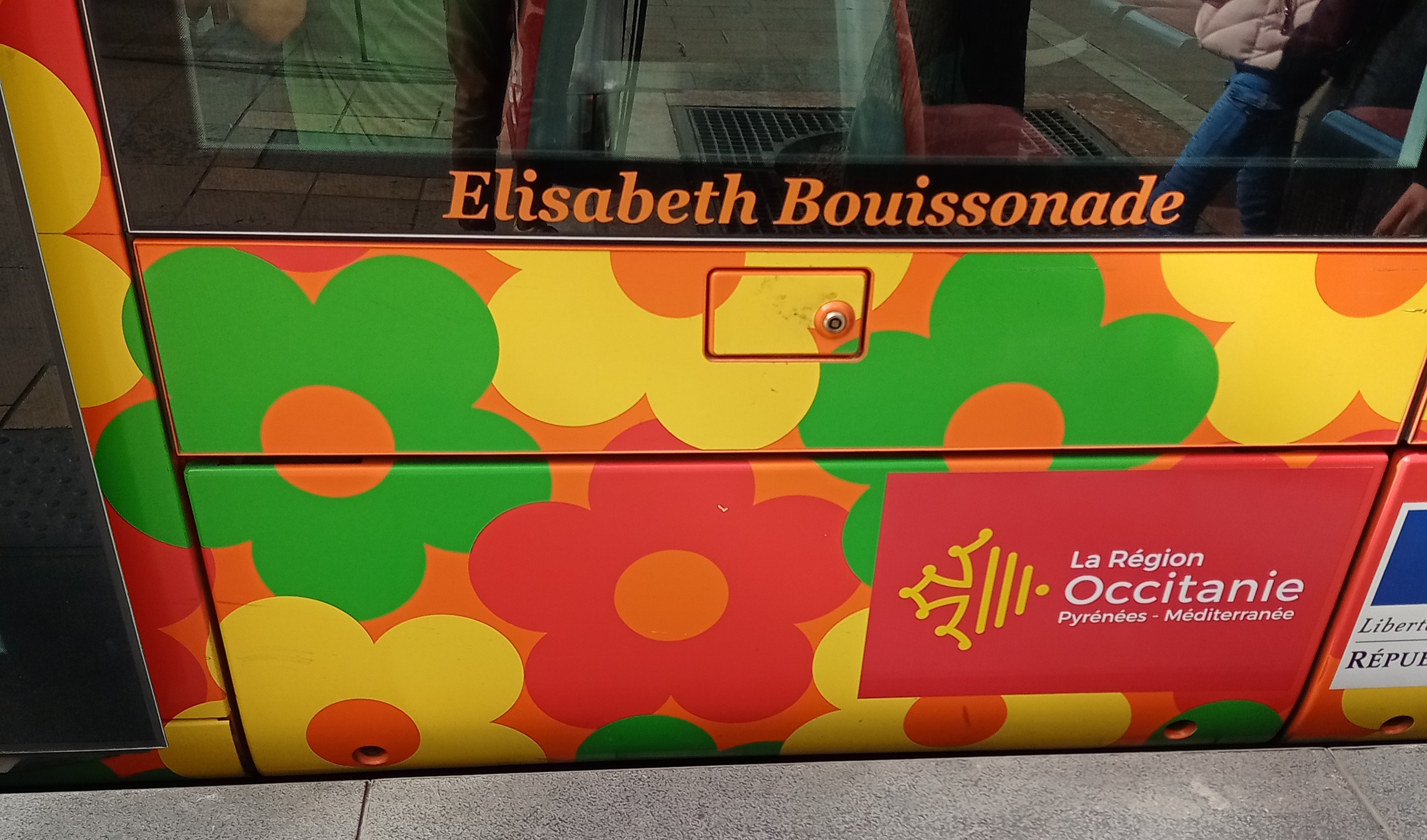
  A Montpellier Tram (Line 2) celebrating Élisabeth Bouissonade
- A tram in Montpellier displays Élisabeth Bouissonade's name near the door. It has been nicknamed the "flower train."
