= Château de l'Engarran =

Coordinates: 43.5978°N 3.8069°E

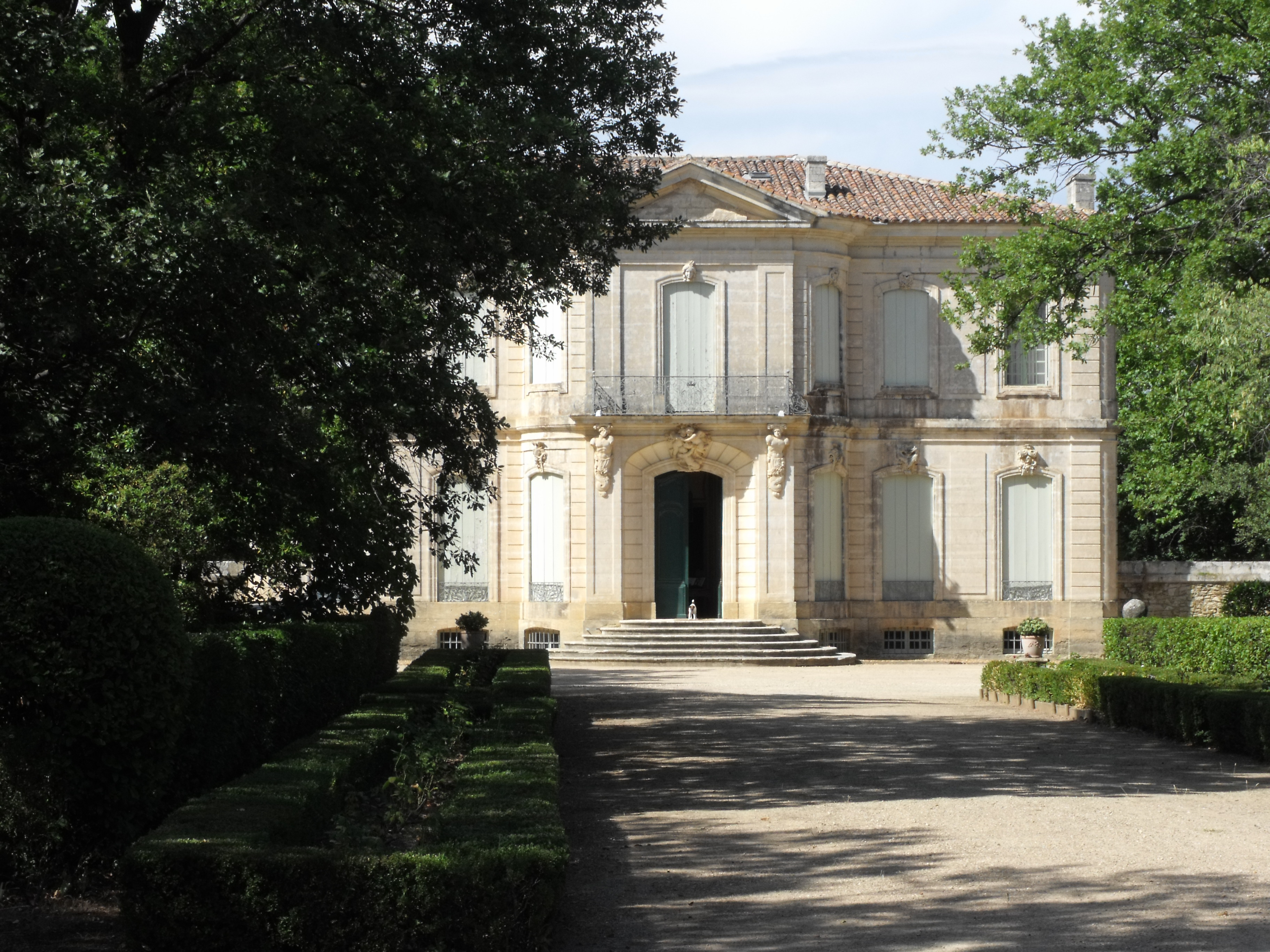
Its south facade

The Château de l'Engarran is an 18th-century Montpellier folly in Hérault in France, on the road between Juvignac and Lavérune. It was built around 1750 on the site of a house dating to 1632. A historic monument since 31 May 1926 (along with its park, fountain and artworks), it has belonged to the same family for five generations and is part of the Engarran domain in the AOC Coteaux du Languedoc.

== Bibliography ==
- Albert Leenhardt, Quelques belles résidences des environs de Montpellier, 1re et 2e séries, reprint of the 1931-1932 edition, Champion-Slatkine, Genève 1985 (ISBN 285203140X)
- Claude Frégnac, Merveilles des châteaux de Provence, collections Réalités, Hachette, Paris 1965 (ASIN B0000DQWGB)
- Alain Dalmasso, Montpellier et sa région, Aubanel, Avignon 1975 (ISBN 978-2700600605)
- Collectif, Châteaux et belles demeures des environs de Montpellier, bulletin du syndicat d'initiative no 47, ville de Montpellier 1975.
