= René de La Croix de Castries =

French historian (1908–1986)

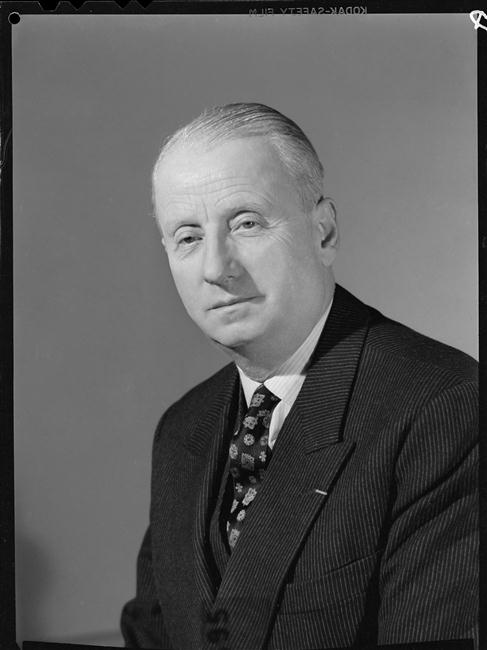
- Born: 6 August 1908; La Bastide-d'Engras, Gard, France
- Died: 17 July 1986 (aged 77); 15th arrondissement of Paris
- Other names: Duc de Castries (pen name and courtesy title)
- Occupations: Mayor; Historian
- Spouse: Monique de Casagne

René de La Croix, count de Castries (French pronunciation: [ʁəne də la kʁwa də kastʁ]; 6 August 1908 – 17 July 1986) was a French historian and a member of the House of Castries. He was the sixteenth member elected to occupy seat 2 of the Académie française in 1972. He wrote under the pen name Duc de Castries, a courtesy title drawn from his family's extinct dukedom.

== Biography ==
=== Early life ===
René de la Croix de Castries was born on 6 August 1908 in La Bastide-d'Engras, Gard, France. He grew up in a castle in Gaujac, Gard, and attended school in Nîmes and Versailles. He studied Political Science and Public Finance.

=== Career ===
He served in the Second World War. He was sent to Lebanon in 1939, and returned to France in 1940.

He served as Mayor of Castries from 1941 to 1950. He moved to Paris in 1951.

He gave lectures at the Cercle de l'Union interalliée, and served as Vice-President of the Société des gens de lettres in 1964. He was appointed to the Académie française on 4 May 1972, becoming the 35th Duke to join the institution.

=== Personal life ===
Castries married Monique de Casagne in 1934. The following year, he bought the family castle, Château de Castries, in Castries, Hérault, near Montpellier. In 1985, he gave the Château de Castries to the Académie française. He died on 17 July 1986.

== Bibliography ==
- Mademoiselle de Méthamis (Calmann-Lévy, 1945)
- Monsieur de Gerland (Jean Vigneau, 1947)
- Les Ténèbres extérieures (Editions La Colombe, 1951)
- Le Maréchal de Castries (Fayard, 1956)
- Languedoc méditerranéen (with André Chamson, Hachette, 1956)
- Le Château de Castries (André Barry, 1958)
- Le Testament de la Monarchie. Tome I : L’indépendance américaine (Fayard, 1958)
- Le Testament de la Monarchie. Tome II : L’Agonie de la Royauté (Fayard, 1959)
- Les Rencontres de Stanley (Éditions France-Empire, 1960)
- Mirabeau ou l’échec du Destin (Fayard, 1960)
- Le Règne de Louis XVI (Club du livre, 1961)
- Le Testament de la Monarchie. Tome III : Les Émigrés (Fayard, 1962)
- Maurice de Saxe (Fayard, 1963)
- La Conspiration de Cadoudal (Del Duca, 1964)
- Les Guerres de Louis XIV et de Louis XV (Plon-Perrin, 1964)
- Le Testament de la Monarchie. Tome IV : De Louis XVIII à Louis-Philippe (Fayard, 1965)
- La Vie quotidienne des émigrés (Hachette, 1966)
- Orages sur l’Église (SPES, 1967)
- Madame du Barry (Hachette, 1967)
- Louis XVIII, portrait d’un roi (Hachette, 1969)
- Le Testament de la Monarchie. Tome V : Le Grand Refus du Comte de Chambord (Hachette, 1970)
- Henri IV, Roi de Cœur, Roi de France (Éditions Larousse, 1970)
- Histoire de France des origines à 1970 (Éditions Robert Laffont, 1971)
- Madame Récamier (Larousse, 1971)
- Figaro ou la vie de Beaumarchais (Hachette, 1972)
- La Fin des Rois. Tome I : Louis XVIII à la recherche de son Royaume (1789-1815) (Librairie Jules Tallandier, 1972)
- La Fin des Rois. Tome II : La France de Louis XVIII (1815-1824) (Librairie Jules Tallandier, 1972)
- La Fin des Rois. Tome III : Charles X (1757-1836) (Librairie Jules Tallandier, 1972)
- La Fin des Rois. Tome IV : Louis-Philippe, Roi des Français (1830-1840) (Librairie Jules Tallandier, 1973)
- La Fin des Rois. Tome V : L’écroulement de la Monarchie (1840-1848) (Librairie Jules Tallandier, 1973)
- La Conquête de la Terre Sainte par les Croisés (Éditions Albin Michel, 1973)
- La Fayette, pionnier de la liberté (Hachette, 1974)
- La France et l’indépendance américaine (Éditions Perrin, 1975)
- Chateaubriand ou la puissance du songe (Éditions Perrin, 1976)
- Papiers de famille (France-Empire, 1977)
- L’Aube de la Révolution, réédition de l’Agonie de la royauté (Librairie Jules Tallandier, 1978)
- La Vieille Dame du quai Conti (Éditions Perrin, 1978)
- Rois et reines de France (Librairie Jules Tallandier, 1979)
- Les Rendez-vous de l’Histoire (Éditions Perrin, 1979)
- Louis-Philippe (Librairie Jules Tallandier, 1980)
- La Terreur blanche (Éditions Perrin, 1980)
- La Pompadour (1983)
- Monsieur Thiers (Éditions Perrin, 1983)
- La Reine Hortense (1984)
- Julie de Lespinasse (1985)
- La Scandaleuse Madame de Tencin (Éditions Perrin, 1986) posthumous
