= Maguelone Cathedral =

Maguelone Cathedrale
- Cathédrale Saint-Pierre-et-Saint-Paul de Maguelone
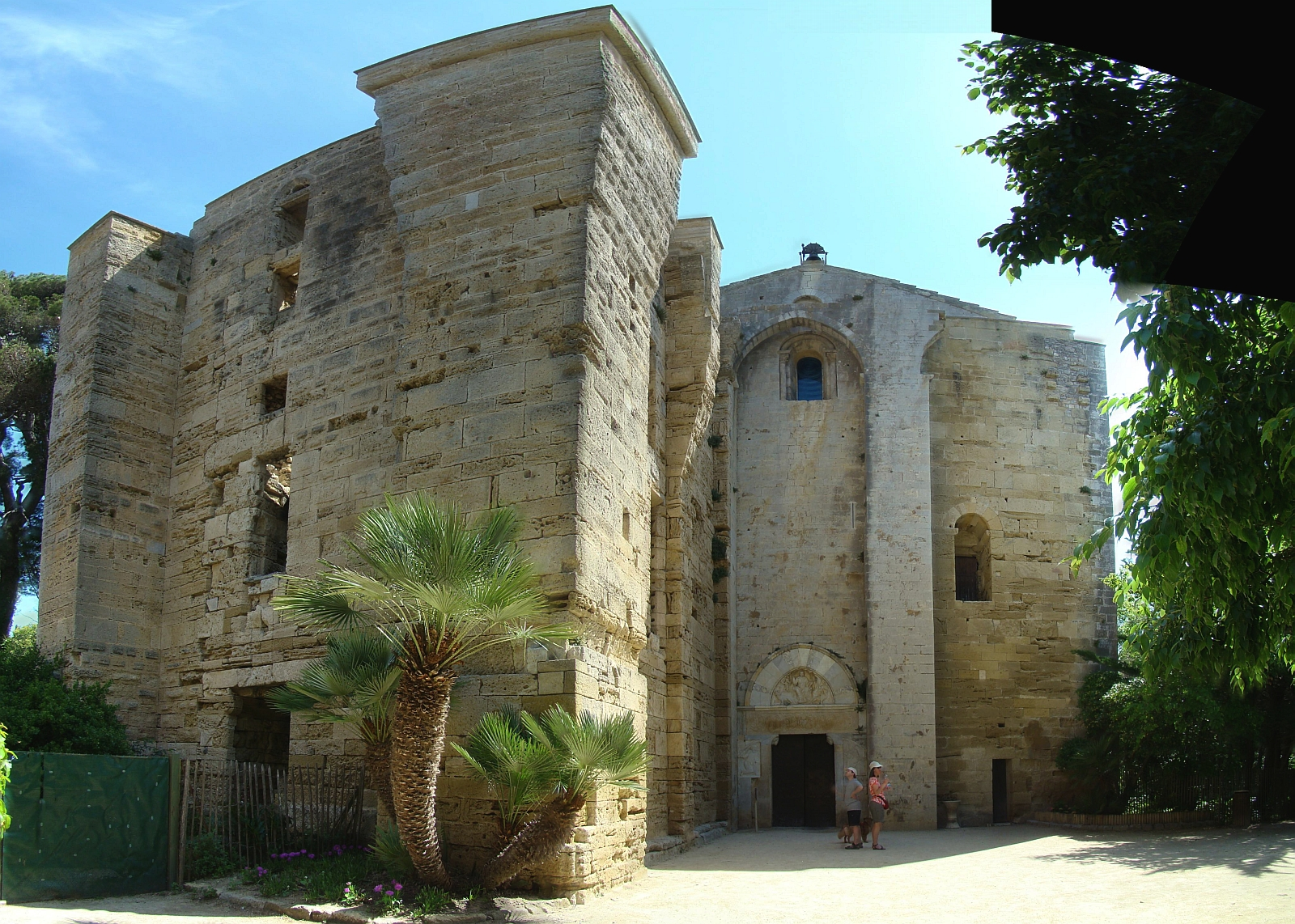

- Location within France
- 43.516689°N 03.891907°E
- Country: France
- Denomination: Roman Catholic Church
- Previous denomination: Hérault, Languedoc-Roussillon
- Website: www.compagnons-de-maguelone.org

History
- Status: Cathedral
- Dedication: St Peter and St Paul
- Consecrated: 1054

Architecture
- Functional status: Preserved
- Heritage designation: Monument historique
- Designated: 1840
- Architectural type: Church
- Style: Romanesque, Gothic
- Closed: 1632

Administration
- Diocese: Maguelone (until 1563); Montpellier

Maguelone Cathedral (French: Cathédrale Saint-Pierre de Maguelone; Cathédrale Saint-Pierre-et-Saint-Paul de Maguelone) is a Roman Catholic church and former cathedral located around 6 miles (9.7 km) south of Montpellier in the Hérault department of southern France. The building stands on an isthmus between the Étang de l'Arnel lake and the Mediterranean Sea in the Gulf of Lion, which was once the site of the original city of Maguelone, opposite the present-day town of Villeneuve-lès-Maguelone.

Maguelone Cathedral was once the episcopal seat of the former Bishop of Maguelone until 1563, when the see was transferred to the newly created Bishopric of Montpellier. The cathedral, constructed when the see was returned here in the 11th century from Substantion by Bishop Arnaud (1030-1060), is a Romanesque fortified building. Although parts, such as the towers, have been demolished, the main body of the building remains functional and is a registered national monument. It is run by a dedicated preservation society, les Compagnons de Maguelone, and is used for both religious and secular purposes.

== History ==
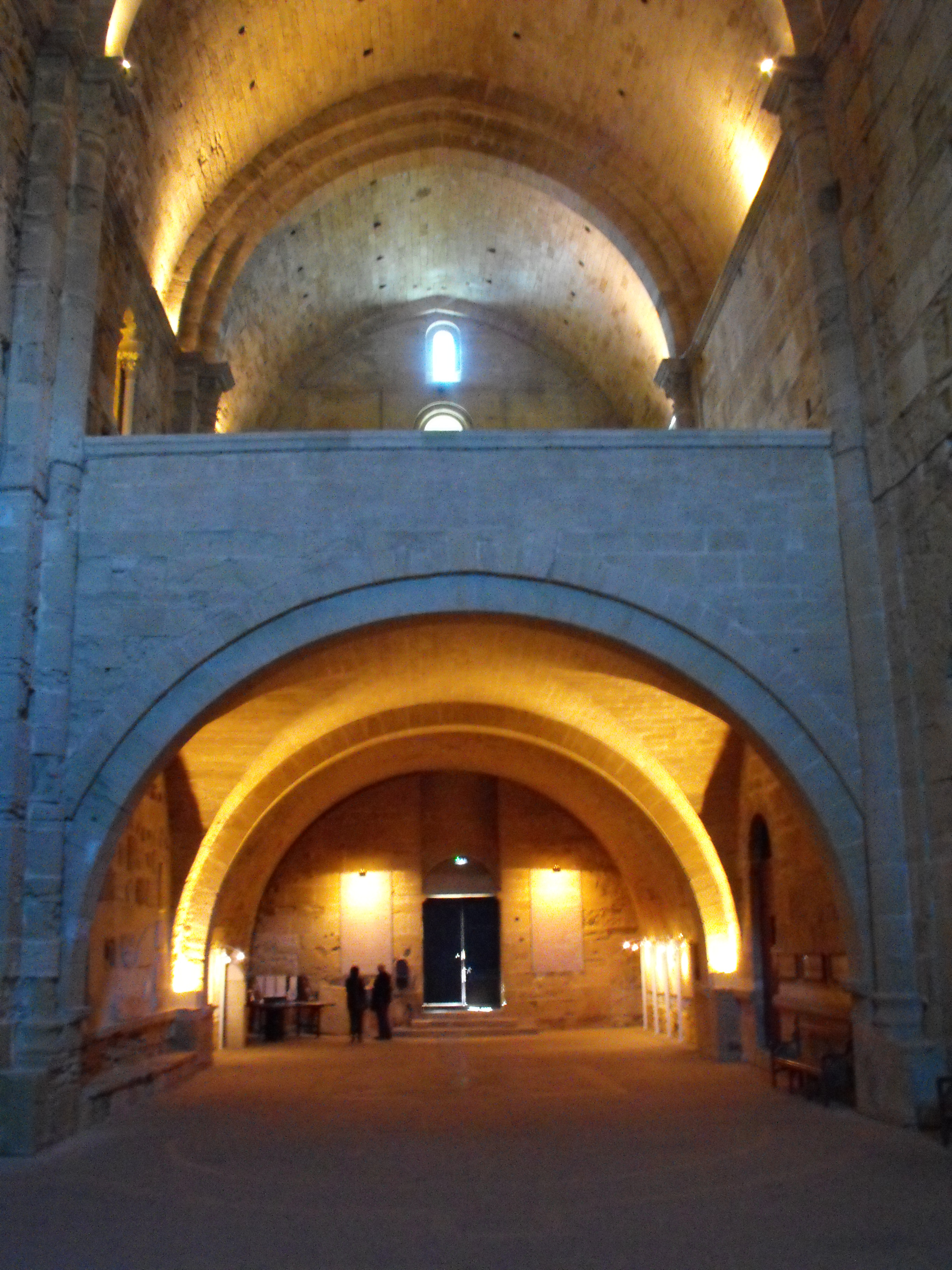
Maguelone Cathedral, interior

=== Origins of the diocese ===
During archaeological excavations in 1967, Roman and Etruscan remains and a number of Visigothic sarcophagi were discovered on this ancient island. The foundations of a church destroyed in the 7th century were also found.

At the fall of the Roman Empire in the 5th century AD, the Visigoths took over part of the region of Melgueil, the island of Maguelone. Christianity gradually imposed its rule on the area. From 533, a bishopric was established on the island. The first bishops were Boethius (until 589), Genies (or Genesius, 597-633?) and a church-cathedral existed on the island. The bishopric of Maguelone appears in the texts at the end of the 6th century, on an island which was said to have been inhabited in antiquity.

The reasons for the establishment of the bishopric of Maguelone on this island away from the Via Domitia road and far from any urban area (the city of Montpellier did not yet exist) are not clear, but the island location meant that the bishopric was accessible only by sea, offering some protection. As well as being the episcopal seat, Maguelone was also the seat of Gothic Counts, which ensured the presence of temporal power.

Although Maguelone was well protected on the inland side, its strategic position meant that it was very vulnerable to invasions from the sea; in 673, the Visigoth King Wamba was besieged here during his campaign of reconquest of Narbonne.

=== Port Saracen ===
During the 8th century, the power of the Visigoths weakened and eventually the Kingdom of Toledo collapsed, allowing the Saracens in Spain to increase their attacks on Christian states. After the conquest of Catalonia, Saracen armies crossed the Pyrenees in 715 and took control of the whole region of Septimania in 719.

Maguelone, because of its key position, was renamed Port Sarrasin (Port Saracen), probably a fortified place. A harbour was established allowing ships to dock and unload their cargo safely. Today an area called the Sarrazine corresponds to an inlet (Grau in Occitan) which was the site of these constructions. Despite the Muslim invasion, freedom of worship was maintained on the island, its inhabitants being granted the status of dhimmi ("protected person" in Arabic).

In response to the invasion, the Franks began their campaign of reconquest. Following the Battle of Poitiers in 732, the Saracens gradually abandoned the south of France, pursued by Charles Martel. In 737, after Martel's failure to reconquer Septimania, he destroyed the first cathedral at Maguelone which had been converted into a mosque by the Saracens. The architecture of the original building remains unknown.

Since then the site remained virtually abandoned for three centuries, although it seems that Maguelone continued to support a precarious settlement despite the threat of pirates. The bishop of Maguelone moved his seat a few kilometres north-east to the ancient oppidum named Substantion, the site of the present-day municipality of Castelnau-le-Lez, in the County of Melgueil (present-day Mauguio).

=== 11th century revival ===
From 1030, Arnaud, Bishop of Maguelone from 1029 to 1060, decided to rebuild the cathedral at Maguelone. He adopted a chapter of twelve Canons Regular, after the Rule of St. Augustine. A chapel adjoining the south of the cathedral building is dedicated to St. Augustine, which survives today.

To improve access to the city, which could only be reached by boat, Arnaud built a bridge nearly 1 kilometre (0.62 mi) in length which stretched from the island to Villeneuve-les-Maguelone, which was placed in the charge of a dignitary of the chapter. He also erected fortifications to protect the site from attacks by Muslims.

Bishop Arnaud and his successors were subject to the suzerainty of the Counts of Melgueil. In 1085 the Counts bequeathed their rights over the diocese to Pope Gregory VII. They received many donations; Maguelone, now the property of the Holy See and a safe haven, was flourishing. Pope Urban II visited the island in 1096, and proclaimed that Maguelone Cathedral was "second only to that of Rome."

=== 12th & 13th centuries: Peak of the Bishopric of Maguelone ===
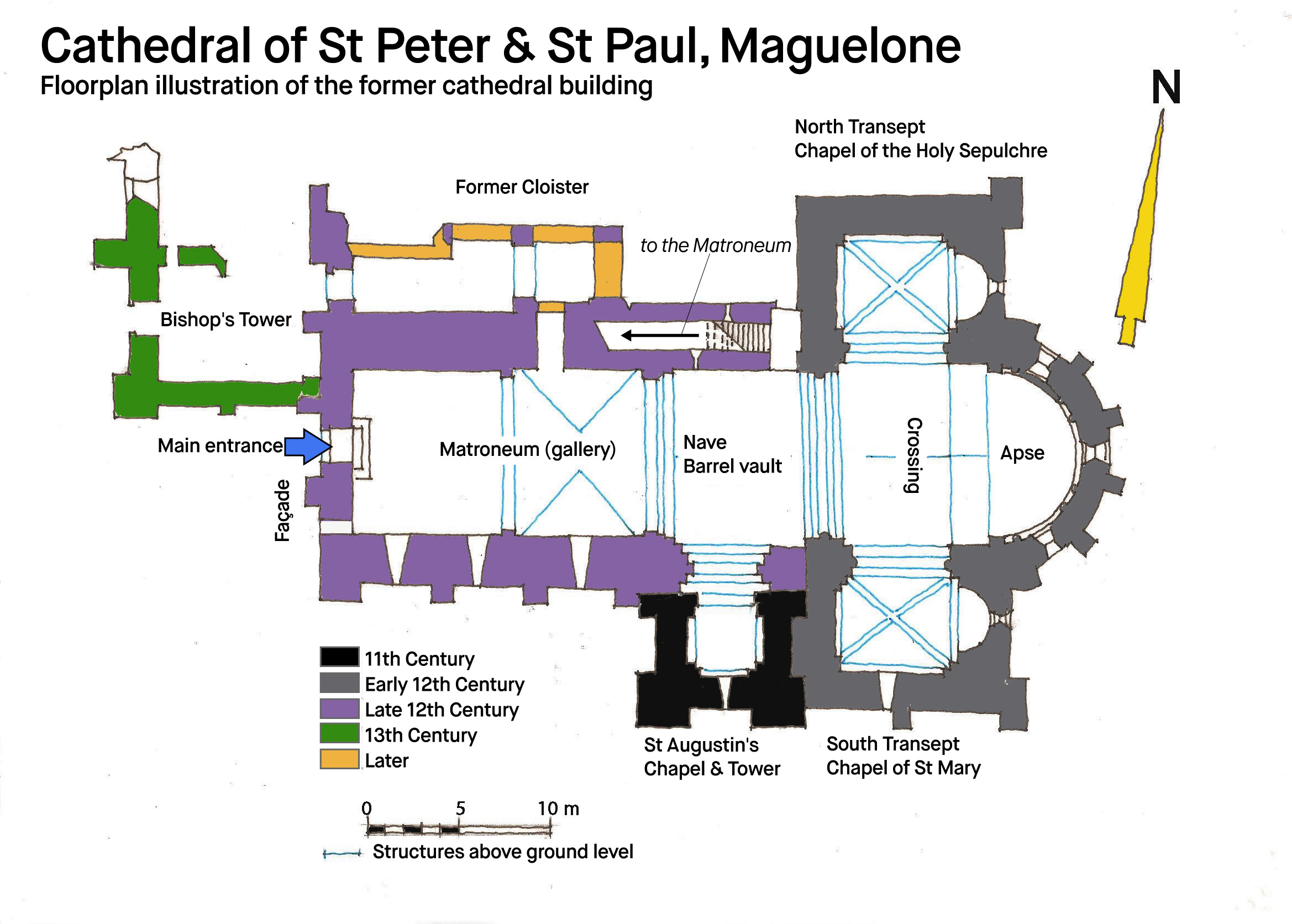
Floorplan illustration of the cathedral building

With political and ecclesiastical turmoil raging Italy, a number of pontiffs who fled to France found refuge at Maguelone; Pope Gelasius II was given sanctuary here in 1118, as was Pope Alexander III in 1163, who dedicated the newly built high altar when at Maguelone.

The prestige and the increased wealth of the diocese lead to the construction of a new cathedral, replacing the building that dated back to the episcopate of Arnaud. Three bishops led this major undertaking: Bishop Galtier (1104-1129) built the chevet and apse, and the wide fortified transept; Bishop Raymond (1129-1158) continued this work with the construction of the high altar, the episcopal throne and the two towers at the bottom of the transept; and finally, Jean de Montlaur (1161-1190) built the Romanesque nave, calling for the participation of the faithful.

At the beginning of the 13th century, two towers were built to defend the western front, Saint John's Tower and the Bishop's Tower (now partially ruined), ensuring the diocese was securely protected. During the Albigensian Crusade, Maguelone remained a bastion of the papacy: Melgueil County, property of the Count of Toulouse Raymond VI, was put under the rule of Maguelone by Pope Innocent III. The archdeacon of Maguelone at this time was Pierre de Castelnau, the papal legate in Languedoc, whose murder in Saint-Gilles in 1208 triggered hostilities against the Cathars.

=== Decay and abandonment ===
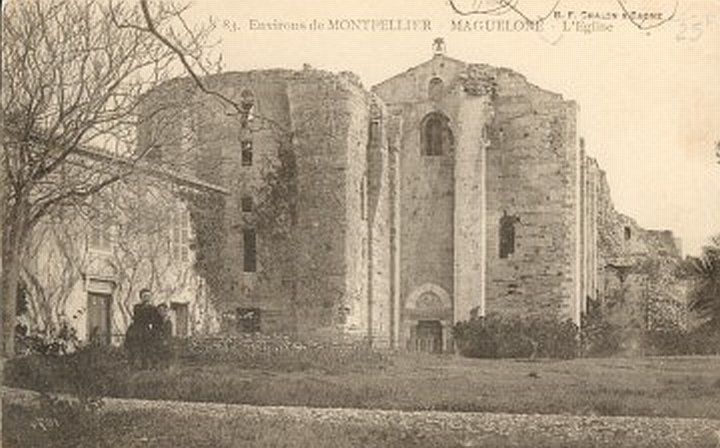
1900 postcard of the dilapidated cathedral

The prosperous bishopric of Maguelone aroused the envy of the Kingdoms of France and Aragon. In the 15th century the bishop moved his residence to Montpellier while the canons remained in Maguelone, managed by the provost of the cathedral chapter. The see was abolished in 1536 and the bishop then settled permanently in Montpellier. The canons sold off the monastic buildings, which gradually fell into ruin. The fortified cathedral, now a Protestant stronghold, was partially demolished in 1632 on the orders of Cardinal Richelieu. Sections of walls were sold in 1708 for use in the construction of the Canal du Rhône à Sète which connects the nearby Thau lagoon at Sète to the Rhône River.

Sold as national property during the Revolution and classified as a historic monument in 1840, the area of Maguelone was acquired by the historian Frédéric Fabrege in 1852 who began a programme of restoration. He carried out excavations which uncovered the cathedral's rich past, rediscovering the foundations of older buildings. He also planted a number of Mediterranean plant species, the island then being totally denuded of trees. Christian worship returned to the cathedral in 1875. Fabrege's son donated the island to the Diocese of Montpellier in 1949.

=== Present day ===
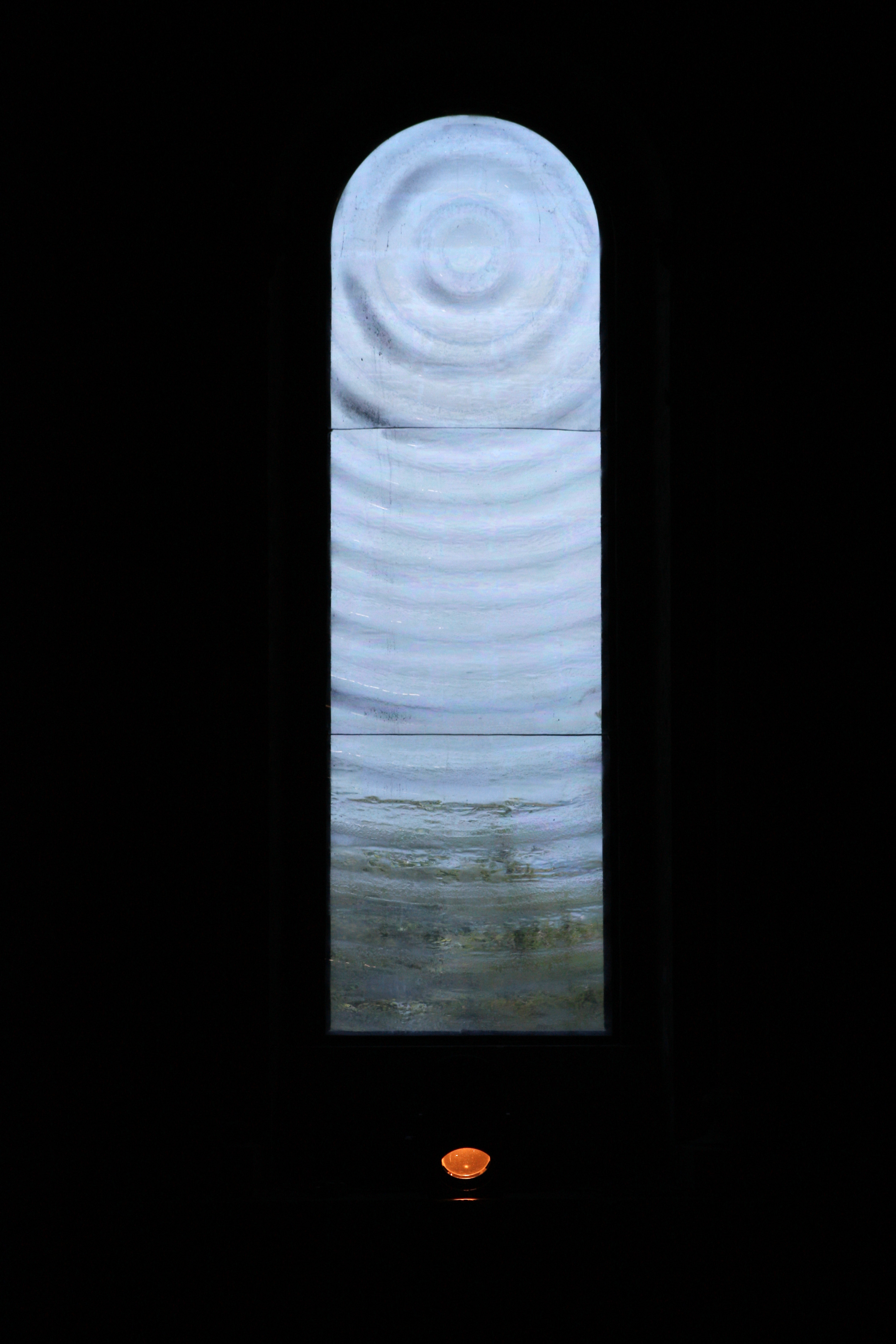
One of Robert Morris's rippled glass windows

In 1967, an important archaeological project helped to ascertain the age of the site.

A work assistance centre is now based at the cathedral, managed by the Compagnons de Maguelone, which works to promote the reintegration of adults with learning disabilities, continuing the cathedral's mission of hospitality. The centre's activities include agricultural work, aquaculture, fishing, and outsourcing activities.

In 2002, seventeen pale blue and beige-coloured stained-glass windows designed by Robert Morris and produced by Ateliers Duchemin glassmakers were placed in the restored window lights. These designs depict the ripples of a pebble dropped in water.

Today, Maguelone hosts le Festival de musique ancienne de Mauguelone, a music festival that is held annually in June in the cathedral by the Friends of the Festival of Maguelone. This popular event for lovers of early music stages performances of medieval and renaissance music in the magnificent setting of the cathedral, as well as baroque music, romantic music and rare or forgotten works.

== Gallery ==
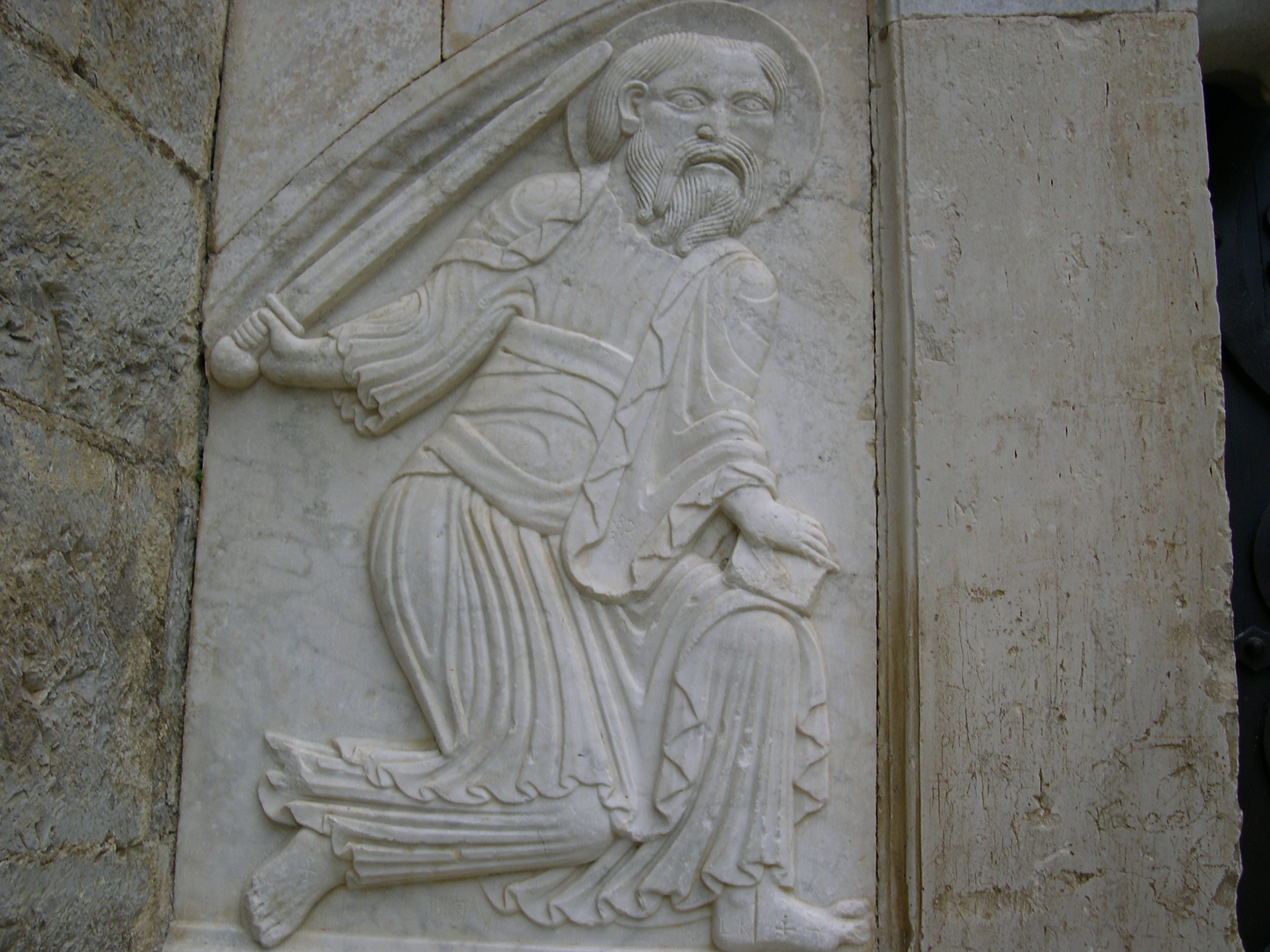
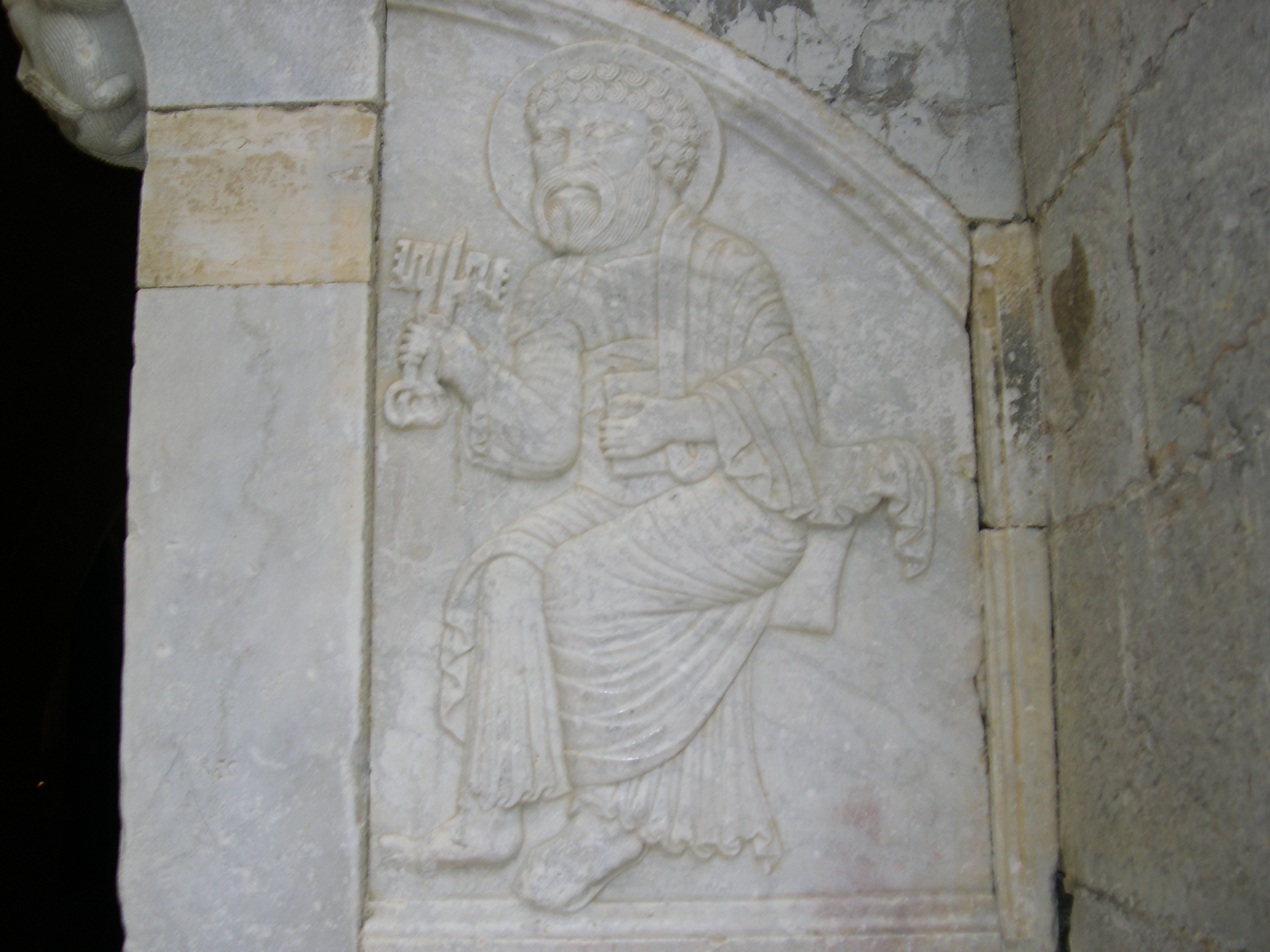
Portal: Saint Paul (left) and Saint Peter (right). These reliefs once formed part of a Romanesque tympanum, now replaced by a Gothic one.

== See also ==
- Notre-Dame des Tables de Montpellier
