= House of Castries =

House of la Croix de Castries
- Family coat of arms
- Country: France
- Current region: Languedoc
- Founded: 1744 (de facto)
- Current head: Henri de Castries
- Historic seat: Château de Castries; Hôtel de Castries
- Titles: Duke of Castries; Marquis of Castries; Count of Castries; Baron of Castries

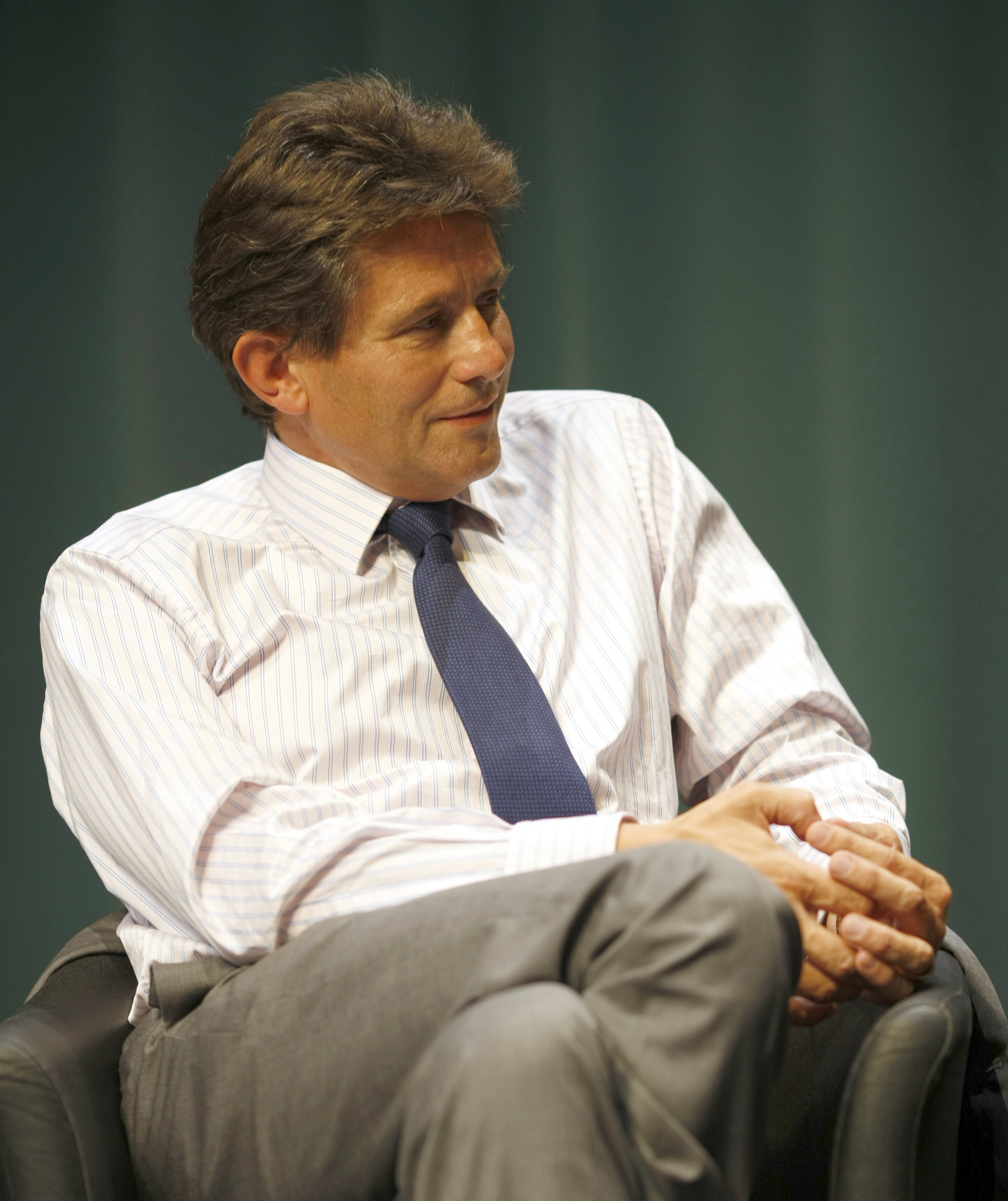
Henri de La Croix de Castries, 5th Comte de Castries

The House of la Croix de Castries (French pronunciation: [la kʁwa də kastʁi]) is a French noble family from Languedoc. The city of Castries in the Caribbean island of Saint Lucia was named after one of its members.

== History ==
Their heraldic shield is "azure, on a cross, or". Family tradition holds that one of the family's members was Saint Roch, the pilgrim apostle who dedicated his life to the service of the sick and plague-victims in the 13th century. The La Croix de Castries family, however, was not ennobled until the end of the 15th century, as Nobles of the Sword. It was admitted to the honours of court in 1744, 1753, 1776, and 1786.

== Duc de Castries ==
The title of duc de Castries was conferred by brevet in 1784, with the promise that the title duc de Guines would revert to them, to Armand Charles Augustin de La Croix de Castries. Under the Bourbon Restoration, on 4 June 1817 he was re-created duc de Castries et Pair de France.

- 1784-1842 : Armand Charles Augustin de La Croix (1756–1842), first duc de Castries.
- 1842-1866 : Edmond Eugène Philippe Hercule de La Croix (1787–1866), second duc de Castries, son of the former.
- 1866-1886 : Edmond Charles Auguste de La Croix (1838–1886), third duc de Castries, nephew of the former.

The ducal title, fallen into disuse due to the death of the third duke without issue, was re-created as a courtesy title in 1907 by René Edmond Marie Gabriel de La Croix de Castries (1842–1913), comte de Castries, an old diplomat belonging to a cadet branch of the family.

== Notable members of the family ==
The house of Castries has included a marshal of France, a navy minister, several lieutenant generals and major generals, knights knighted by the king, and masters of the royal bedchamber.

By year of birth, notable members are:

- Armand Pierre de La Croix de Castries (c. 1659–1747), archbishop of Albi then of Tours.
- Jean-François de la Croix, first marquis de Castries (1663–1728), King's lieutenant général in Languedoc.
- Charles Eugène Gabriel de La Croix, marquis de Castries (1727–1801), marshal of France and naval minister.
- Louis Augustin de La Croix de Castries (1728–1737), knight of Malta.
- Armand Charles Augustin de la Croix, duc de Castries and pair de France (1756–1842).
- Eugène de la Croix, baron then comte de Castries (1790–1825).
- Elisabeth de Mac-Mahon, born Elisabeth de La Croix de Castries (1834–1900), wife of Patrice de Mac-Mahon, the second president of the French Third Republic.
- Henry Marie de La Croix de Castries (1850-1927) French explorer and cartograph.
- Christian de Castries (1902–1991), general, who commanded the defeated French army at the Battle of Dien Bien Phu in 1954.
- René de La Croix de Castries (1908–1986), marquis, called duc de Castries, (1908–1986), historian and member of the Académie française.
- Henri de La Croix de Castries (born 1954), president of the board of directors of AXA.

== See also ==
- Hôtel de Castries
- Château de Castries
- Castries
