= La Bastide-d'Engras =

Commune in Occitanie, France

- Commune
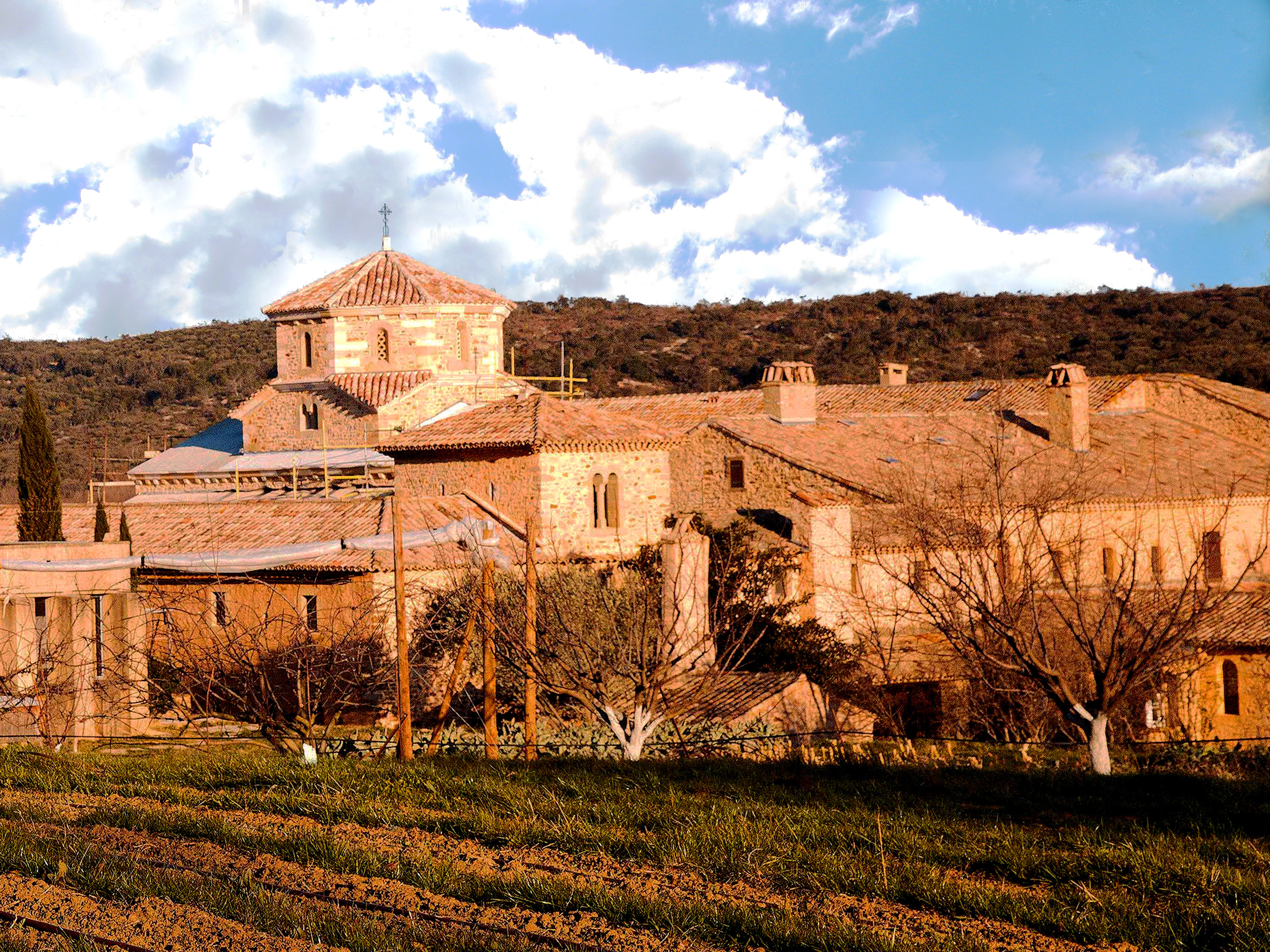
- The Solan Monastery in La Bastide-d'Engras

- Coat of arms
- Location of La Bastide-d'Engras
- Location within France Location within Occitanie
- Coordinates: 44°05′44″N 4°28′45″E
- Country: France
- Region: Occitania
- Department: Gard
- Arrondissement: Nîmes
- Canton: Uzès

Government
  - Mayor (2020–2026): Pascal Gisbert
- Area^{1}: 9.85 km^{2} (3.80 sq mi)
- Elevation: 250 m (820 ft)
- Highest elevation: 260 m (850 ft)
- Lowest elevation: 154 m (505 ft)
- Population (2023): 205
  - Density: 20.8/km^{2} (53.9/sq mi)
- Time zone: UTC+01:00 (CET)
  - Summer (DST): UTC+02:00 (CEST)
- INSEE/Postal code: 30031 /30330
- ^{1} French Land Register data, which excludes lakes, ponds, glaciers > 1 km^{2} (0.386 sq mi or 247 acres) and river estuaries.

La Bastide-d'Engras is a commune in the Gard department in southern France.

== Population ==
Historical population
Year	Pop.	±% p.a.
1968	201	—
1975	179	−1.64%
1982	178	−0.08%
1990	177	−0.07%
1999	191	+0.85%
2007	214	+1.43%
2012	208	−0.57%
2017	196	−1.18%
2023	205	+0.75%
Source: INSEE

== See also ==
- Communes of the Gard department
