= Villeneuve-lès-Maguelone =

- Commune
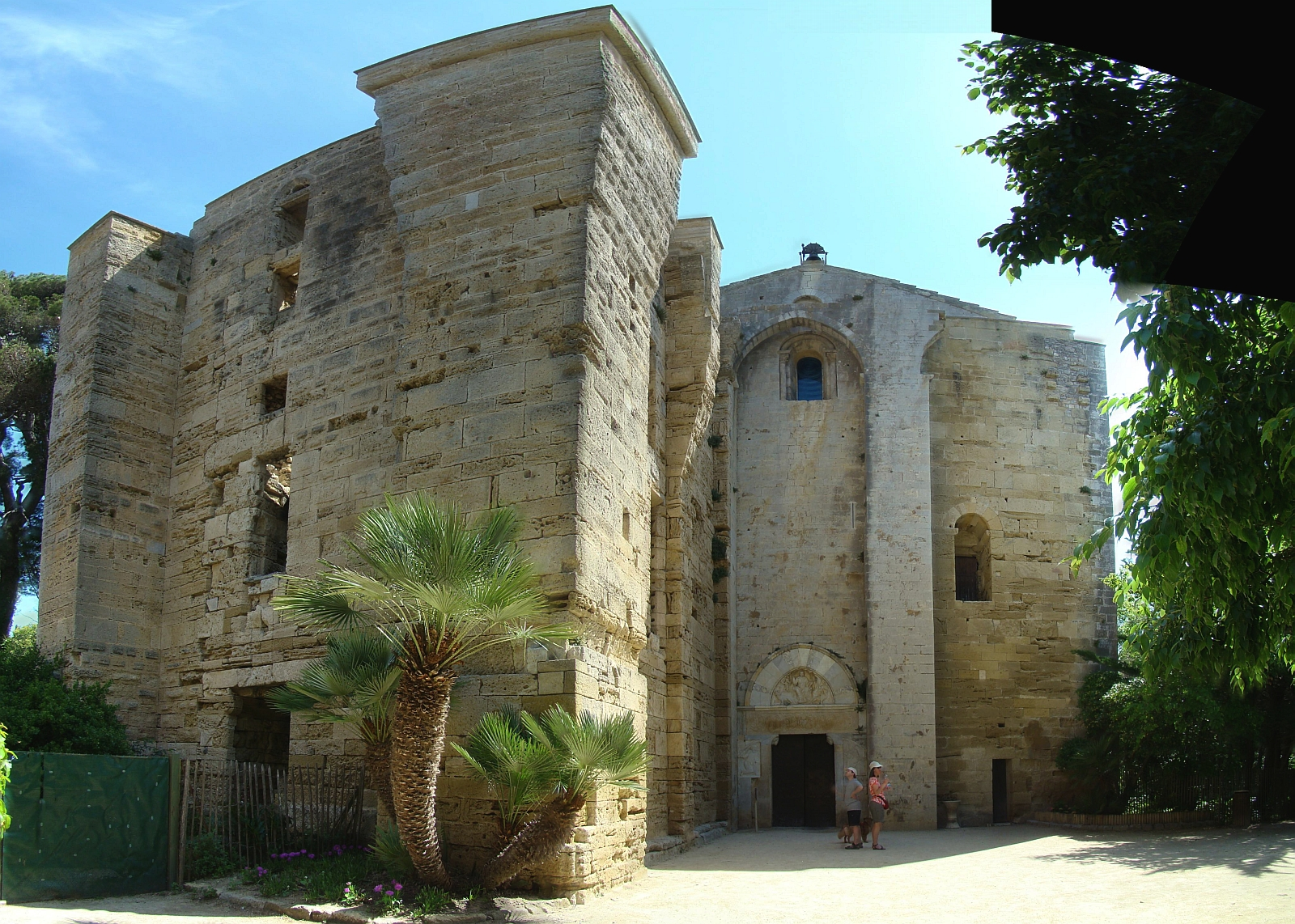
- Maguelone Cathedral

- Coat of arms
- Location of Villeneuve-lès-Maguelone
- Location within France Location within Occitanie
- Coordinates: 43°31′59″N 3°51′42″E
- Country: France
- Region: Occitania
- Department: Hérault
- Arrondissement: Montpellier
- Canton: Pignan
- Intercommunality: Montpellier Méditerranée Métropole

Government
  - Mayor (2020–2026): Véronique Negret
- Area^{1}: 35.12 km^{2} (13.56 sq mi)
- Elevation: 8 m (26 ft)
- Highest elevation: 130 m (430 ft)
- Lowest elevation: 0 m (0 ft)
- Population (2023): 10,872
  - Density: 309.6/km^{2} (801.8/sq mi)
- Time zone: UTC+01:00 (CET)
  - Summer (DST): UTC+02:00 (CEST)
- INSEE/Postal code: 34337 /34750
- ^{1} French Land Register data, which excludes lakes, ponds, glaciers > 1 km^{2} (0.386 sq mi or 247 acres) and river estuaries.

Villeneuve-lès-Maguelone (Occitan: Vilanòva de Magalona, before 1992: Villeneuve-lès-Maguelonne) is a commune in the Hérault department in the Occitanie region in Southern France. Villeneuve-lès-Maguelone station has rail connections to Narbonne, Montpellier and Avignon.

== Etymology ==
The name Maguelone is a variation of Latin "margarita" (pearl), from Persian "margaritis" - in modern French the "marguerite" (daisy) took its name from the precious stone. The ending is probably a misattribution: "-ita" is a common Romance feminine diminutive suffix, equivalent in meaning to the Occitan "-ona".

== History ==
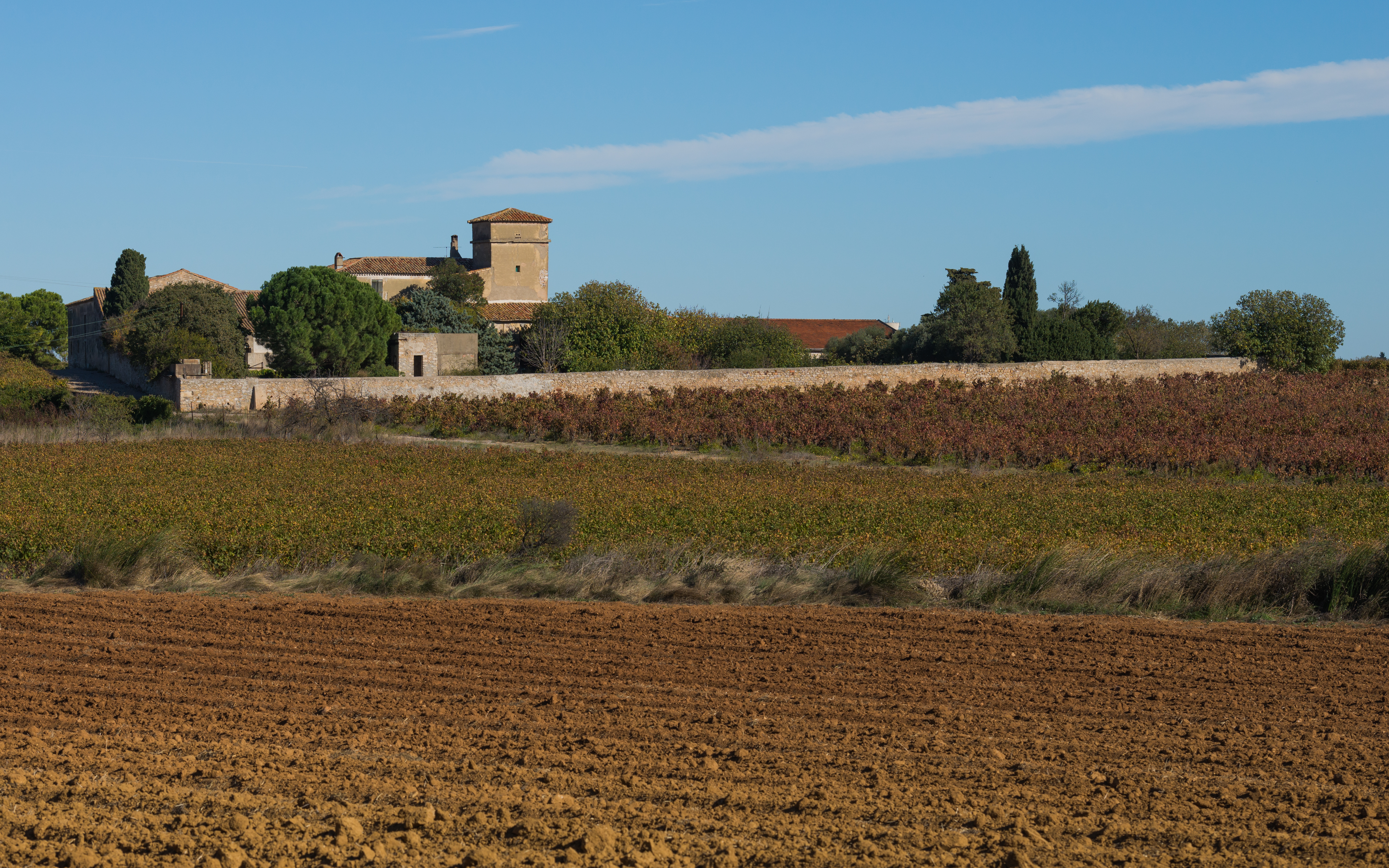

Maguelone (or Maguelon) was one of the "seven cities" that may have been the origin of the name for the region called Septimania. Septimania was the western region of the Roman province of Gallia Narbonensis, which passed under the control of the Visigothic kingdom in 462, when Septimania was ceded to Theodoric II, king of the Visigoths. The seven cities were today's Elne, Agde, Narbonne, Lodève, Béziers, Nîmes and Maguelone.

In the aftermath of the Battle of Vouille (507), Maguelone managed to remain out of Frankish sway, and was part of the Visigothic kingdom. At first the stronghold of a Visigothic noble, on high ground protected by coastal lagoons, Maguelone became the seat of a bishop. When the early history of Maguelone was compiled in 1583 by Abbé Gariel (Histoire des évêques de Maguelonne) he provided the see with an apostolic origin, as is de rigueur for any long-established bishopric of Late Antiquity throughout the three Gauls. The first historical bishop of Maguelonne, Boetius, assisted at the Council of Toledo in 589; doubtless the Christian community was far older.

In the 8th century (circa 725) the Umayyad forces conquered the area, but the stronghold was destroyed by Charles Martel in his 737 campaign across Septimania, almost depopulating the region. The Gallo-Roman and Gothic nobility allied with the Andalusian military kept the position until 752, when Pepin the Short tipped the scale in favour of the Franks, who conquered Septimania.

The diocese was removed to Substantion (Sextantio), but Bishop Arnaud (1030–1060) returned it, rebuilt the destroyed sanctuary and constructed a bridge to link Maguelone to the "new district" of Villeneuve. The powerful and compact Romanesque Maguelone Cathedral, dedicated to Saint Peter, was constructed.

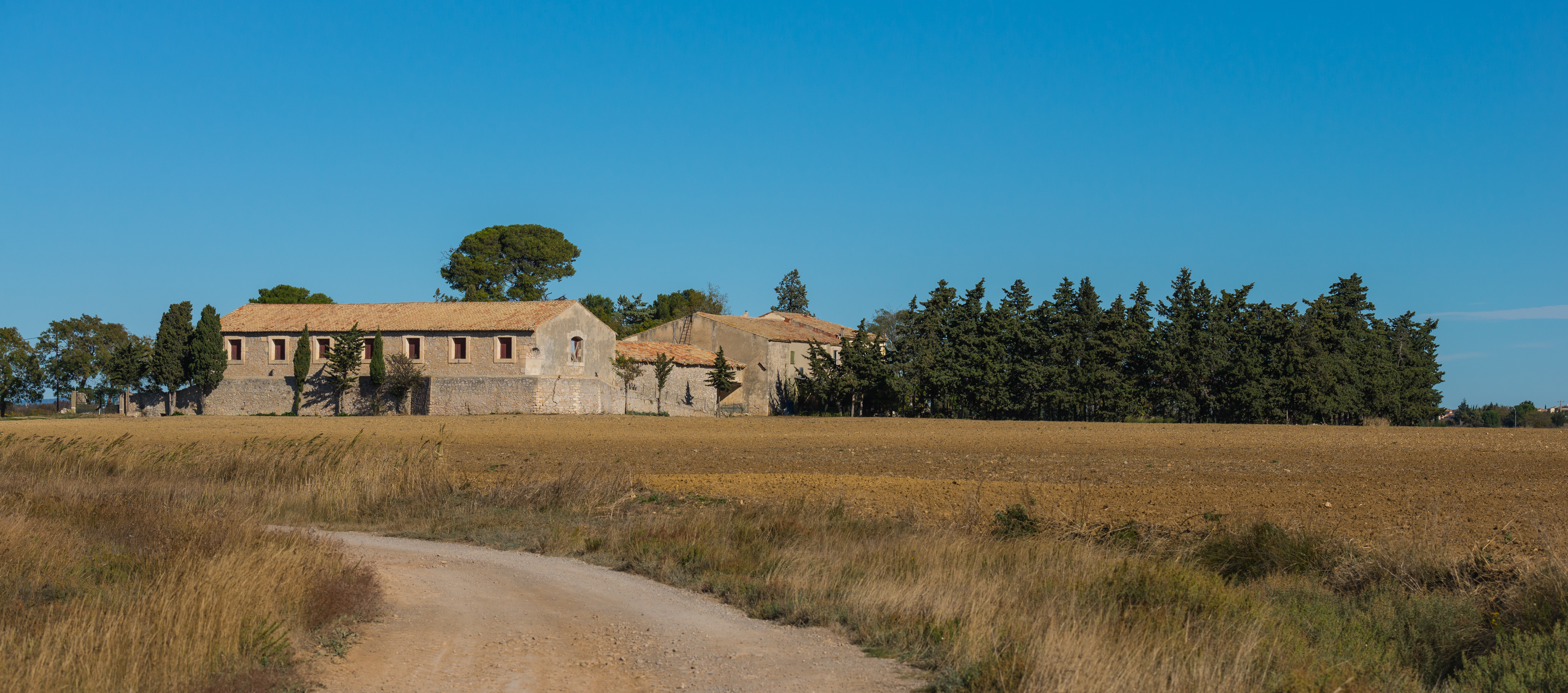

The local count retained the traditional Carolingian right of nomination of bishops: in 1085 Pierre, count of Substantion and Melgueil, offered himself as vassal of the Holy See and relinquished the right of nomination, and Innocent III transferred the feudal rights of the county to the bishop of Maguelonne in 1215, which gave the bishops the right to issue coinage. The bishop, as well as the King of Aragon and the Count of Toulouse, authorized the coinage of Arabic money, not intended for circulation in Maguelonne, but to be sold for exportation to the merchants of the Mediterranean.

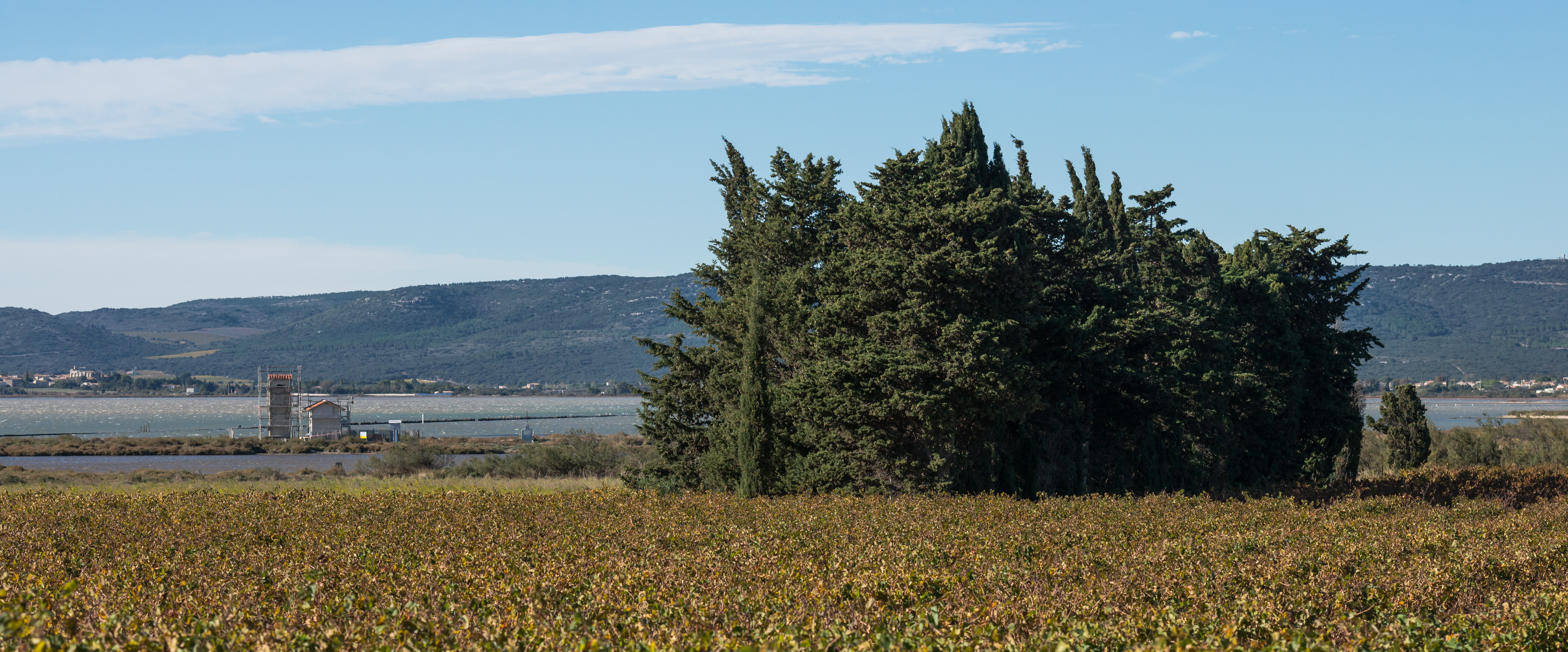

With the expansion of trade in the revival of the High Middle Ages, Montpellier came to be the city for this region, first passing to the Crown of Aragon in 1204, then to that of France (1292 and 1349). In 1536 the see was finally transferred there.

A sentimental and chivalric romance of the high-born Miguelonne and Pierre, the son of the King of Provence, who recognized each other in their old age after many heartbreaking separations, inspired a verse: Epistle by Clément Marot.

For the history of the bishopric of Maguelonne, see Bishopric of Montpellier as the episcopal see was transferred there in 1536.

== Geography ==
=== Climate ===
Villeneuve-lès-Maguelone has a mediterranean climate (Köppen climate classification Csa). The average annual temperature in Villeneuve-lès-Maguelone is 15.0 °C (59.0 °F). The average annual rainfall is 592.2 mm (23.31 in) with October as the wettest month. The temperatures are highest on average in July, at around 23.6 °C (74.5 °F), and lowest in January, at around 7.3 °C (45.1 °F). The highest temperature ever recorded in Villeneuve-lès-Maguelone was 43.4 °C (110.1 °F) on 28 June 2019; the coldest temperature ever recorded was −11.5 °C (11.3 °F) on 6 January 1985.

Climate data for Villeneuve-lès-Maguelone (1981–2010 averages, extremes 1980−present)
Month	Jan	Feb	Mar	Apr	May	Jun	Jul	Aug	Sep	Oct	Nov	Dec	Year
Record high °C (°F)	22.1 (71.8)	24.5 (76.1)	28.1 (82.6)	30.7 (87.3)	34.4 (93.9)	43.4 (110.1)	37.6 (99.7)	38.9 (102.0)	35.4 (95.7)	32.1 (89.8)	25.6 (78.1)	21.7 (71.1)	43.4 (110.1)
Mean daily maximum °C (°F)	11.5 (52.7)	12.5 (54.5)	15.5 (59.9)	17.8 (64.0)	21.4 (70.5)	25.7 (78.3)	28.6 (83.5)	28.3 (82.9)	24.6 (76.3)	20.3 (68.5)	15.2 (59.4)	12.2 (54.0)	19.5 (67.1)
Daily mean °C (°F)	7.3 (45.1)	8.1 (46.6)	10.8 (51.4)	13.3 (55.9)	16.9 (62.4)	20.8 (69.4)	23.6 (74.5)	23.3 (73.9)	19.7 (67.5)	16.1 (61.0)	11.1 (52.0)	8.1 (46.6)	15.0 (59.0)
Mean daily minimum °C (°F)	3.0 (37.4)	3.6 (38.5)	6.2 (43.2)	8.8 (47.8)	12.4 (54.3)	15.9 (60.6)	18.5 (65.3)	18.3 (64.9)	14.8 (58.6)	11.8 (53.2)	7.0 (44.6)	4.0 (39.2)	10.4 (50.7)
Record low °C (°F)	−11.5 (11.3)	−9.3 (15.3)	−7.0 (19.4)	0.1 (32.2)	4.2 (39.6)	6.0 (42.8)	10.5 (50.9)	9.8 (49.6)	5.5 (41.9)	−0.3 (31.5)	−5.7 (21.7)	−7.0 (19.4)	−11.5 (11.3)
Average precipitation mm (inches)	50.6 (1.99)	50.9 (2.00)	35.5 (1.40)	48.2 (1.90)	40.1 (1.58)	29.2 (1.15)	16.2 (0.64)	30.4 (1.20)	72.6 (2.86)	91.9 (3.62)	65.5 (2.58)	61.1 (2.41)	592.2 (23.31)
Average precipitation days (≥ 1.0 mm)	5.6	4.7	4.4	5.7	4.8	3.6	2.3	3.6	4.3	6.7	6.0	5.3	57.0
Source: Meteociel

== Population ==
Historical population
Year	Pop.	±% p.a.
1968	1,797	—
1975	2,279	+3.45%
1982	3,003	+4.02%
1990	5,081	+6.79%
1999	7,351	+4.19%
2007	8,627	+2.02%
2012	9,436	+1.81%
2017	10,012	+1.19%
2023	10,872	+1.38%
Source: INSEE

== Sights ==
- In the city:
  - 12th century church Saint-Étienne.
- Around the city:
  - Mountain of the Madeleine: shrubland, army ground, ruin of the Saint-Baudille vault at the top (185 m), and stele commemorating the French Resistance fighters shot during the Second World War.
  - Estagnol National Nature Reserve, a marsh between scrubland and vine.
- In the outskirts:
  - Romanesque Maguelone Cathedral
  - Public beach: The sand dunes extend from Palavas-les-Flots to Frontignan-Plage. Some sections of the beach are not accessible by automobile and thus popular with naturists.
  - Ponds: fishing, bird watching.
  - The Canal du Rhône à Sète allows river tourism between the Rhône, the étang de Thau, and the Canal du Midi.

== See also ==
- Notre-Dame des Tables de Montpellier
- Communes of the Hérault department
