= Hôtels particuliers of Montpellier =

Hotels in a part of France

The city of Montpellier in southern France has a large number of noteworthy historic hôtels particuliers (in English: mansions), in its old centre. These hôtels are listed on this page with a short description. Most of them were built during the period that Montpellier was capital of the Languedoc, under the reign of King Louis XIV.

== Hôtels ==
Hôtel de Cambacérès

Hôtel Richer de Belleval

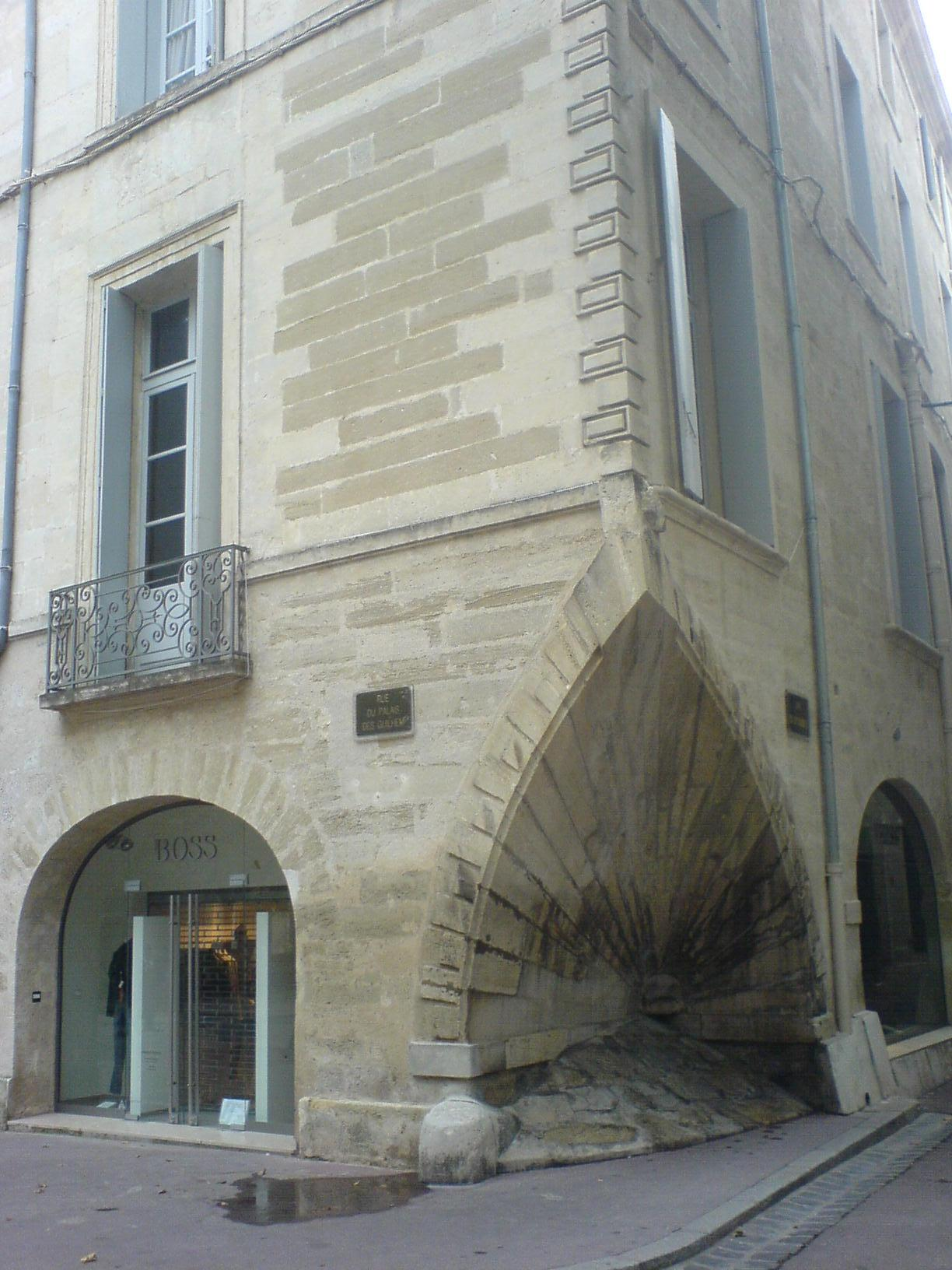
Hôtel du Sarret

- Hôtel Baudon de Mauny Built in 1777 incorporating earlier Gothic elements, with a flowery façade in Louis XVI style.
- Hôtel Sabatier d'Espeyran 19th century example of a Second Empire hôtel
- Hôtel de Cambacérès Built between 1723 and 1730 by architect Jean Giral, for the then mayor of Montpellier, Jean Jacques Régis de Cambacérès.
- Hôtel de Manse Late 17th century. Home of the Count of Manse, also treasurer to the King of France. The interior façade was designed by Italian artists.
- Hôtel Richer de Belleval This hôtel was built for Charles de Boulhaco in 1676, incorporating fragments from previous buildings on the site. In 1692, Georges Richer de Belleval took over residence. In 1816 the building was acquired by the city to serve as the town hall. It is located on the Place de la Canourgue, facing the Hôtel de Cambacérès.
- Hôtel de St-Côme The building is now used as the Chamber of Commerce. Built between 1752 and 1756, by Jean Giral. The hôtel was built with money bequeathed to the surgeons of Montpellier by François Gigot de la Peyronie, surgeon of Louis XV, so they could have an anatomical theatre which remains inside. In 1792, it was closed in the turmoil of the French Revolution.
- Hôtel du Sarret From 1636, nicknamed Maison de la Coquille or 'shell house'.
- Hôtel de Solas Early 17th century, with a noteworthy porch ceiling.
- Hôtel des Trésoriers de France Jacques Coeur, treasurer of the French king, lived in this hôtel from its construction in 1432. He had the mansion's vaulted cellars and coffered ceilings built. In 1675, it was bought by the Trésoriers de France, an administrative body in charge of the royal estates in Languedoc, who added the impressive staircase and façade. It is also known under the name of Lunaret, after Henri de Lunaret who bequeathed the hôtel to the city of Montpellier. The building now houses the Musée Languedocien.
- Hôtel des Trésoriers de la Bourse by Jean Giral. The building has two courtyards with a grand open staircase. Also known as the Hôtel Rodez-Benavent.
- Hôtel d'Uston 18th century, with exuberant decoration consisting of wreaths and cherubs.
- Hôtel de Varennes Originally medieval, renovated and façade added in the 18th century. The interior consists of several rooms with gothic rib vaults and ancient romanesque columns from a church previously located here. The 14th century Salle Pétrarque is the official reception hall of the city of Montpellier.
- Hôtel de la Vieille Intendance Home of the sociologist Auguste Comte and the writer Paul Valéry.
