= Château de Castries =

Château in Castries, Hérault, France

Coordinates: 43°40′38.43″N 3°59′12.95″E

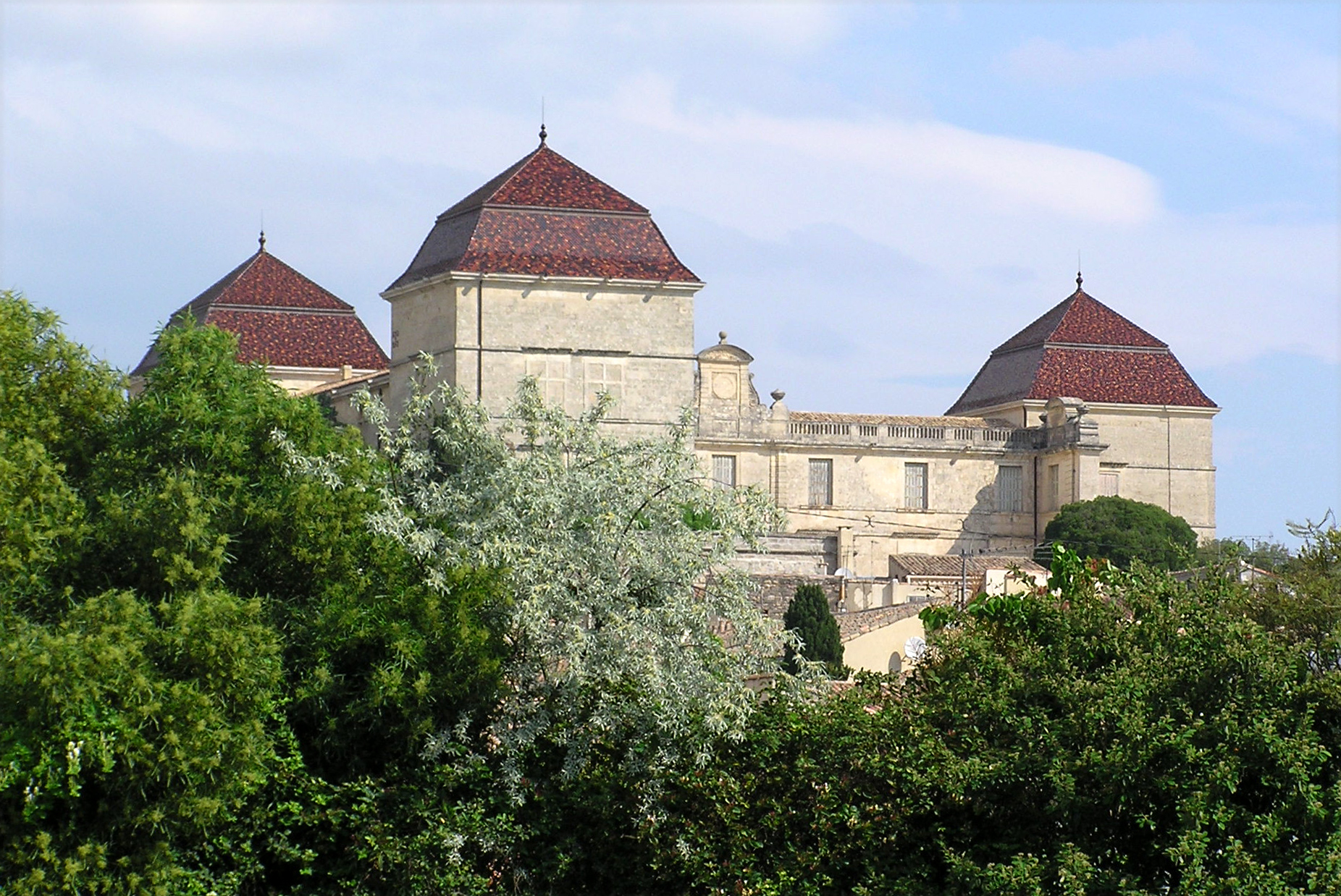
Château de Castries

The Château de Castries is a château in Castries, Hérault, France.

== History ==
The estate has belonged to the House of Castries since 1465. In 1565, Jacques de Castries undertook the building of a new château. The garden was laid out by André Le Nôtre in 1666. The aqueduct, to water the garden, was built by Pierre-Paul Riquet.

The main house was looted and damaged during the French Revolution of 1789 and was restored in 1828. In 1935, it was bought back by René de La Croix de Castries. In 1985, he donated the house to the Académie française. It is open to the public.
