= Castries, Hérault =

Castries Càstrias (Occitan)
- Commune
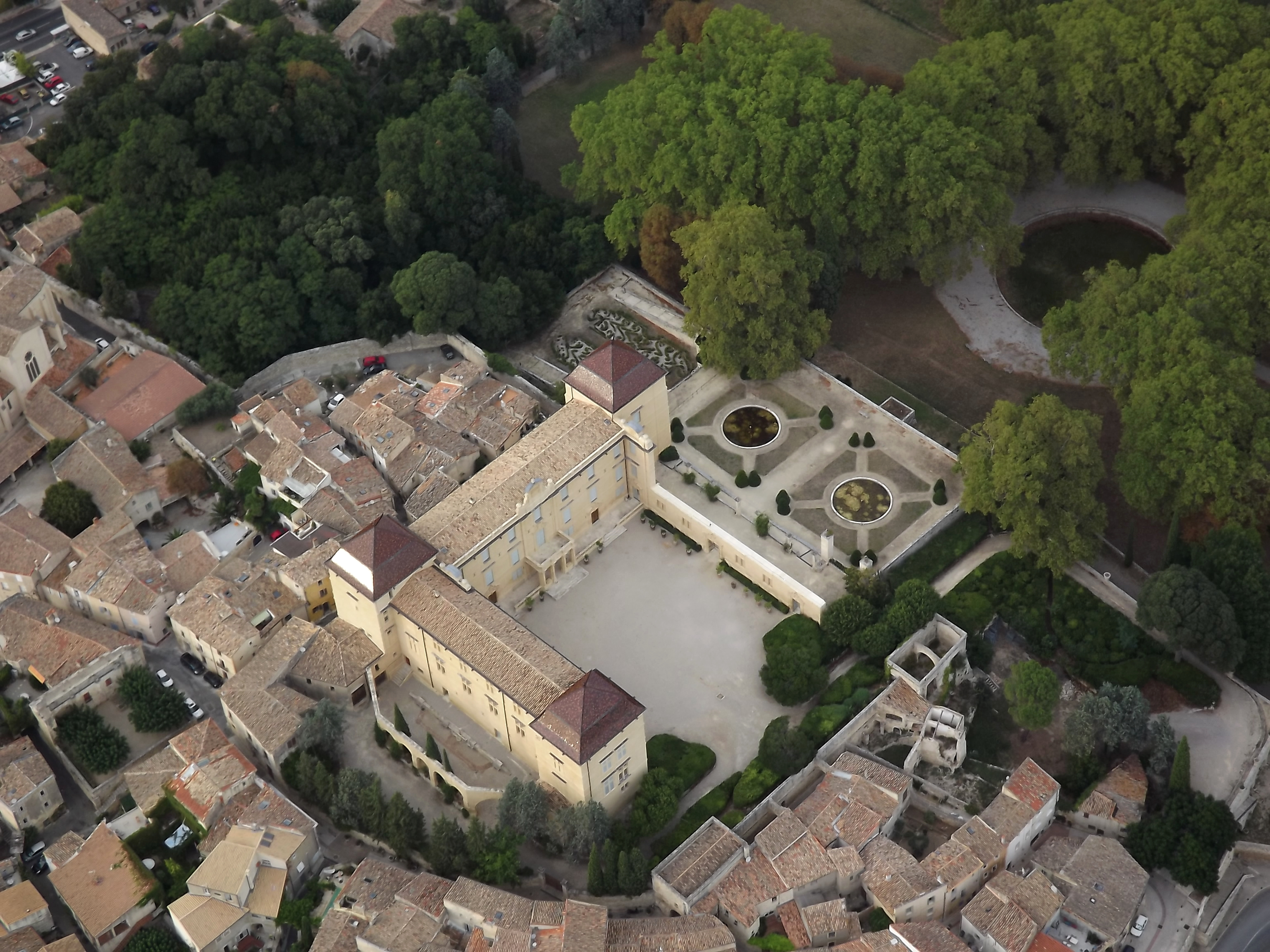
- An aerial view of the Château de Castries

- Coat of arms
- Location of Castries
- Location within France Location within Occitanie
- Coordinates: 43°40′47″N 3°58′56″E
- Country: France
- Region: Occitania
- Department: Hérault
- Arrondissement: Montpellier
- Canton: Le Crès
- Intercommunality: Montpellier Méditerranée Métropole

Government
  - Mayor (2020–2026): Claudine Vassas Mejri
- Area^{1}: 24.05 km^{2} (9.29 sq mi)
- Elevation: 70 m (230 ft)
- Highest elevation: 154 m (505 ft)
- Lowest elevation: 20 m (66 ft)
- Population (2023): 6,883
  - Density: 286.2/km^{2} (741.2/sq mi)
- Demonym: Castriotes
- Time zone: UTC+01:00 (CET)
  - Summer (DST): UTC+02:00 (CEST)
- INSEE/Postal code: 34058 /34160
- Website: www.castries.fr
- ^{1} French Land Register data, which excludes lakes, ponds, glaciers > 1 km^{2} (0.386 sq mi or 247 acres) and river estuaries.

Castries (French pronunciation: [kastʁi]; Occitan: Càstrias) is a commune in the Hérault department in southern France.

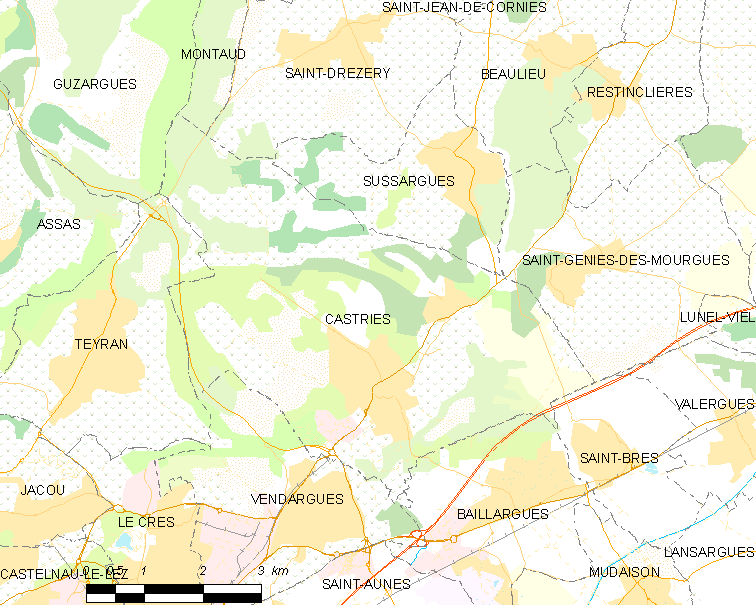
lMap

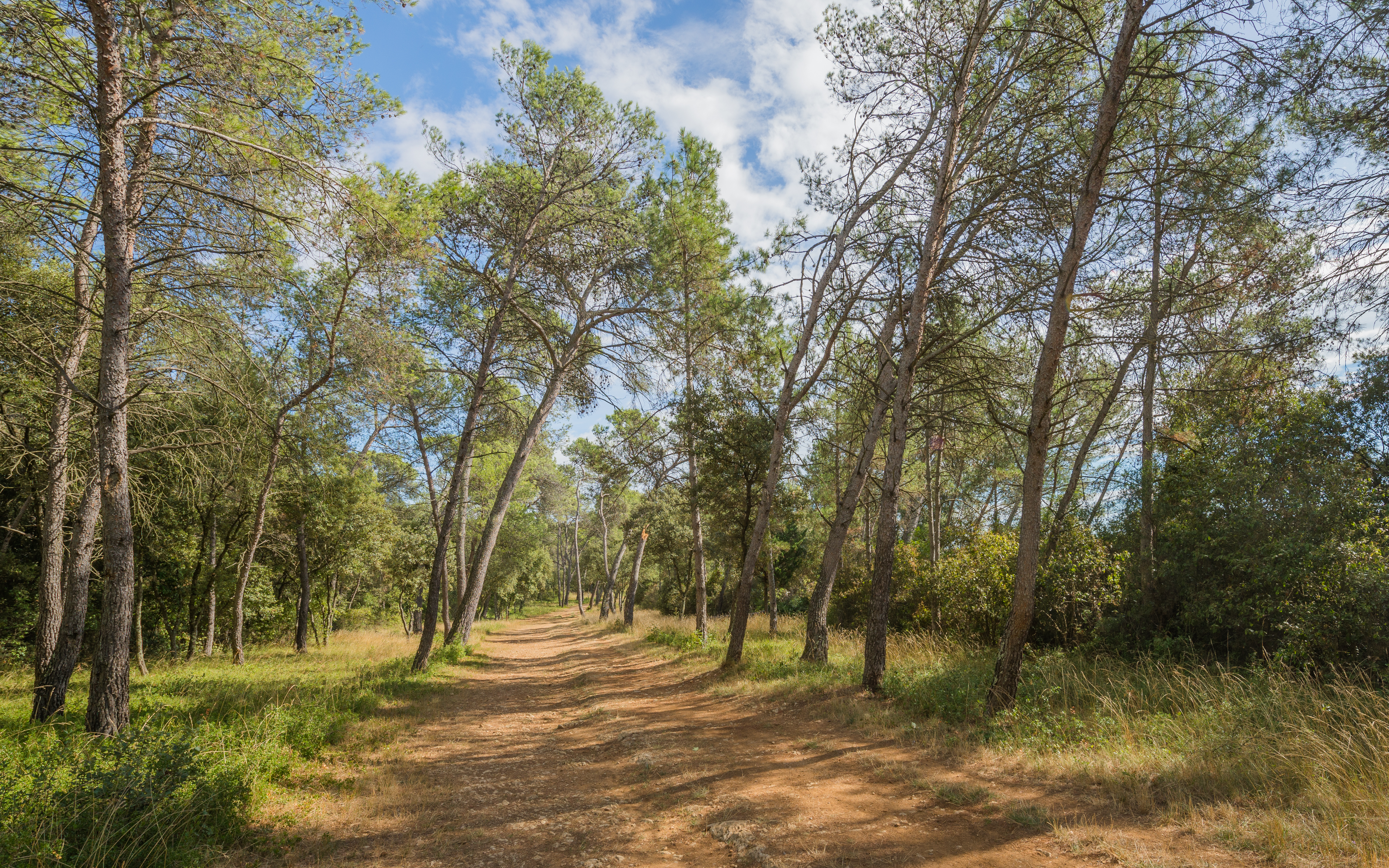
A wood called Les Pins

== Population ==
Historical population

Year	Pop.	±% p.a.
1793	511	—
1800	558	+1.26%
1806	615	+1.63%
1821	787	+1.66%
1831	715	−0.95%
1836	798	+2.22%
1841	954	+3.64%
1846	1,017	+1.29%
1851	1,126	+2.06%
1856	1,150	+0.42%
1861	1,213	+1.07%
1866	1,386	+2.70%
1872	1,415	+0.35%
1876	1,212	−3.80%
1881	1,044	−2.94%
1886	1,080	+0.68%
1891	1,168	+1.58%
1896	1,280	+1.85%
1901	1,339	+0.91%

Year	Pop.	±% p.a.
1906	1,336	−0.04%
1911	1,242	−1.45%
1921	1,368	+0.97%
1926	1,364	−0.06%
1931	1,430	+0.95%
1936	1,234	−2.91%
1946	1,090	−1.23%
1954	1,247	+1.70%
1962	1,368	+1.16%
1968	1,791	+4.59%
1975	2,461	+4.64%
1982	3,419	+4.81%
1990	3,992	+1.96%
1999	5,146	+2.86%
2007	5,471	+0.77%
2012	5,873	+1.43%
2017	6,178	+1.02%
2023	6,883	+1.82%

Source: EHESS and INSEE (1968-2023)

== Twin towns – sister cities ==
Castries is twinned with Volpiano, Italy since 2010.

== Sights ==
- Château de Castries. There is also a stone aqueduct which originally supplied water to the chateau.

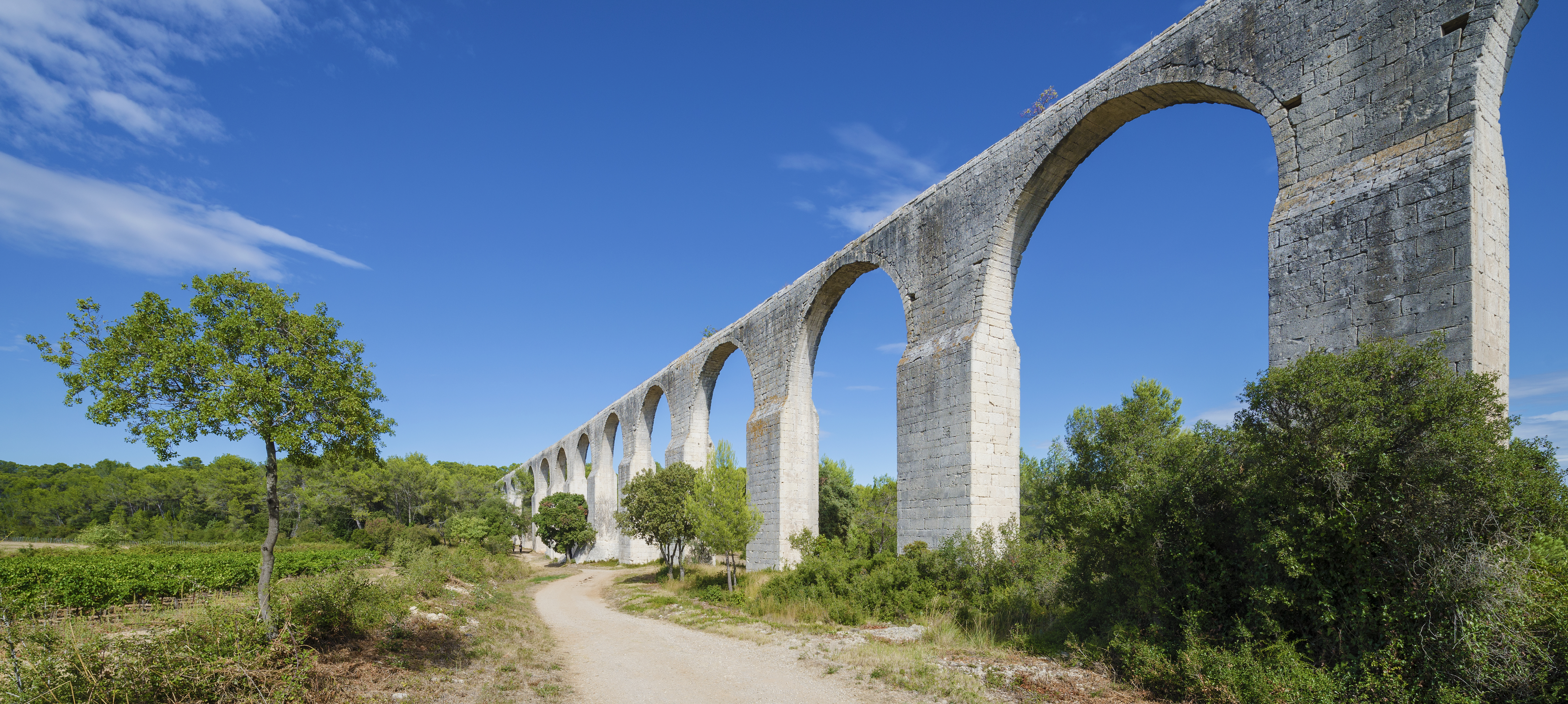
Aqueduc of Castries

== See also ==
- Communes of the Hérault department
