= Vincent Darius =

Grenadian Roman Catholic bishop (1955–2016)

The Most Reverend Vincent Darius, O.P.
- Bishop of Saint George's in Grenada
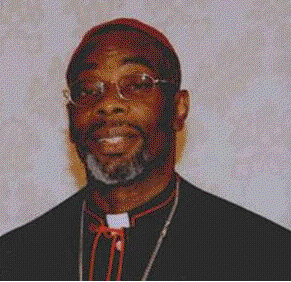
- See: Saint George's in Grenada
- Appointed: 10 July 2002
- Term ended: 26 April 2016
- Predecessor: Sydney Charles
- Successor: Clyde Martin Harvey

Orders
- Ordination: 28 June 1987
- Consecration: 2 October 2002 by Kelvin Felix & Malcolm McMahon

Personal details
- Born: Vincent Matthew Darius; 6 September 1955 Crochu, Grenada, British Windward Islands
- Died: 26 April 2016 (aged 60) Manhattan, New York
- Denomination: Roman Catholic
- Coat of arms

Vincent Matthew Darius, OP (6 September 1955 – 26 April 2016) was the Bishop of the Roman Catholic Diocese of Saint George's in Grenada from 2002 until his death.

== Life until priesthood ==
Darius was born in Crochu, a village of the Grenadian parish of Saint Andrew's, and received primary education at the local RC school before advancing to Grenada Boys' Secondary School. For three years after this he taught at Pomme Rose RC Primary before aspiring to the Dominican Order, based at Mount Saint Ervans, in 1978.

Received into the novitiate the next year, he made his first profession on 15 September 1980. He settled in Trinidad at the Holy Cross Priory in Arima and on the island studied for the priesthood at the then-regional Seminary of St John Vianney and the Uganda Martyrs in St Augustine, though the latter he also did at the Universidad Central de Bayamón (Puerto Rico) and the Aquinas Institute of Theology (St Louis, MO). Here he obtained a graduate certificate in spiritual direction.

== Priesthood ==
He was ordained on 28 June 1987 by Bishop Lester Guilly, SJ, then emeritus of the Roman Catholic Diocese of Georgetown (Guyana), in the church of his childhood (in Crochu), St Martin de Porres. The next year he was elected prior of his order's house of formation back in Puerto Rico.

Upon his return to Grenada he was appointed pastor of Saint Paul's and, a year later, of Grand Anse. Then, in 1989, he was appointed promoter of justice within his order for the Caribbean, in which role he served for six years. He was also elected to two terms as the first prior of the newly established house at Roxborough, Saint Paul's.

Among the many other positions in which he served his native diocese, Darius sat on the college of consultors and the council of priests.

== Episcopacy ==
On 10 July 2002, while serving as the spiritual director of the seminary by appointment of the Antilles Episcopal Conference (AEC), it was announced that Darius was elected by Pope John Paul II to be the fourth Bishop of St George's in Grenada, after he had accepted the resignation of Sydney Charles (which was announced in the same release). With this the diocese was to be led for the first time by a native of the country and once again by a bishop of religious profession (as opposed to Charles, who was, by exception, a priest of the Archdiocese of Port of Spain).

Coat of arms of Bishop Darius

He was consecrated by Charles on 2 October, with then-Archbishop Kelvin Felix of Castries and then-Bishop Malcolm McMahon, OP, of Nottingham as the principal co-consecrators.

In 2003 his Puerto Rican alma mater bestowed on him an honorary doctorate of humanities and their ex-alumni association's award for outstanding achievement.

=== Coat of arms ===
The shield is divided into three sections, but at the top the bands of red, yellow and green represent his national flag.

The right section contains the black and white crest of his Dominican Order as well as a mountain and rising sun for his family background.

The middle section depicts the Caribbean Sea and the islands of his diocese (Grenada, Carriacou and Petit Martinique).

The left section contains the reverse of the Miraculous Medal, recognising the Virgin Mary as patroness of the diocese.

The motto: Proclaim the Good News.

== Death ==
In the early hours of 26 April 2016, after "a battle with pneumonia" and while undergoing medical treatment at Bellevue in New York City, Darius died at the age of sixty. According to a release from his diocese, it appears his sisters and family members were in the city with him, and the release goes on to say that his death was not unexpected. Darius could not be present at this year's APM (Annual Plenary Meeting) of the AEC, which took place just over two weeks prior, in the Archdiocese of Port of Spain.
