= List of cathedrals in Grenada =

This is the list of cathedrals in Grenada sorted by denomination.

== Catholic ==
Cathedrals of the Catholic Church in Grenada:

- Cathedral of the Immaculate Conception, St. George's

== See also ==
- Lists of cathedrals
