= Kelvin Felix =

Catholic cardinal (1933–2024)

His Eminence Kelvin Edward Felix
- Cardinal; Archbishop of Castries
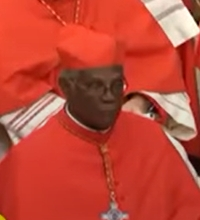
- Felix in 2014
- Church: Catholic Church
- Archdiocese: Castries
- Appointed: 17 July 1981
- Term ended: 15 February 2008
- Predecessor: Patrick Webster
- Successor: Robert Rivas
- Other post: Cardinal Priest of Santa Maria della Salute a Primavalle (2014–2024)

Orders
- Ordination: 8 April 1956
- Consecration: 5 October 1981 by Paul Fouad Tabet
- Created cardinal: 22 February 2014 by Pope Francis
- Rank: Cardinal-Priest

Personal details
- Born: 15 February 1933 Roseau, Dominica
- Died: 30 May 2024 (aged 91) Castries, Saint Lucia
- Motto: Ut omnes unum sint (That all may be one)

Ordination history of Kelvin Felix
History
Priestly ordination
- Date: 8 April 1956
Episcopal consecration
- Principal consecrator: Paul Fouad Naïm Tabet
- Co-consecrators: Gordon Anthony Pantin, CSSp; Samuel Emmanuel Carter, SJ
- Date: 5 October 1981
Cardinalate
- Elevated by: Pope Francis
- Date: 22 February 2014
Episcopal succession
Bishops consecrated by Kelvin Felix as principal consecrator
- Edward Joseph Gilbert, C.SS.R: 7 September 1994
- Gabriel Malzaire: 4 October 2002

Styles of Kelvin Edward Felix
- Reference style: His Eminence
- Spoken style: Your Eminence
- Religious style: Cardinal
- Informal style: Cardinal

Kelvin Edward Felix (15 February 1933 – 30 May 2024) was a Dominican Catholic (Note: The country, not the religious order) prelate who served as Archbishop of Castries from 1981 to 2008. He was made a cardinal in 2014, the first from the Caribbean.

== Youth and early career ==
Kevin Felix was born in Roseau, Dominica, on 15 February 1933 and ordained a priest on 8 April 1956. In 1962 he left the West Indies for St. Francis Xavier University in Nova Scotia, where he earned a diploma in Adult Education in 1963. He obtained a master's degree in sociology and anthropology from the University of Notre Dame in Indiana in 1967 and completed post-graduate studies in sociology at the University of Bradford in England in 1970. He was principal of the Roman Catholic High School in Dominica from 1972 to 1975 and associate general secretary of the Caribbean Conference of Churches from 1975 to 1981.

== Archbishop and cardinal ==
Pope John Paul II named Felix archbishop of Castries on 17 July 1981. He received his episcopal consecration on 5 October 1981 from Archbishop Paul Fouad Tabet who was then apostolic delegate to the Antilles. He served as president of the Antilles Episcopal Conference from 1991 to 1997 and president of the Caribbean Conference of Churches from 1981 to 1986. In addition to the administration of the Catholic Church in St. Lucia, Archbishop Felix was responsible for 33 primary schools, two secondary schools, one girls' vocational school, two homes for the elderly, one shelter for the homeless and an orphanage for young children.

On 12 April 2006, Felix was attacked and grabbed on the neck by a man with a knife, as soon as he finished an evening sermon at the Cathedral Basilica of the Immaculate Conception in Castries. The man ran after Felix was aware of a sawing motion on his throat, and then pushed him backwards. News of the event reminded Saint Lucian natives of a similar attack at the same Cathedral on New Year's Eve, 2000, in which a nun was killed and another injured.

As he approached his retirement age, Felix asked for a coadjutor be appointed to ensure a smooth transition. Pope Benedict XVI accepted his resignation on 15 February 2008.

In retirement, Felix returned to his native Dominica, where he assisted in smaller parishes.

He was created cardinal by Pope Francis on 22 February 2014. He was the Cardinal-Priest of Santa Maria della Salute a Primavalle.

== Cardinal ==
Pope Francis made Felix a cardinal on 22 February 2014, the first from the Caribbean. He was the Cardinal-Priest of Santa Maria della Salute a Primavalle.

== Distinctions ==
The Archbishop was awarded an Honorary Doctorate of Laws in 1986 from St. Francis Xavier University, Nova Scotia and was appointed an Order of the British Empire by Queen Elizabeth II in 1992. In 1999, he was awarded Dominica's highest honour, the Dominica Award of Honour for Meritorious Service by the Government of the Commonwealth of Dominica. In 2002 he received the Medal of Honour (Gold) (SLMH) of the Order of St. Lucia for services to Religion from the Government of St. Lucia on occasion of the 23rd anniversary of the country's independence for having rendered eminent service of national importance to Saint Lucia.

Felix died in Castries on 30 May 2024, at the age of 91.

== See also ==
- Cardinals created by Francis

Catholic Church titles
Preceded by Patrick Webster	Archbishop of Castries; 1981–2008	Succeeded by Robert Rivas
Preceded by Jean Honore	Cardinal-Priest of Santa Maria della Salute a Primavalle; 2014–2024	Vacant
