= Robert Rivas =

Robert Rivas may refer to:

- Robert Rivas (archbishop) (1946–2026), Archbishop Emeritus of the Roman Catholic Archdiocese of Castries
- Robert A. Rivas (born 1980), 71st Speaker of the California State Assembly
