= York House, Grenada =

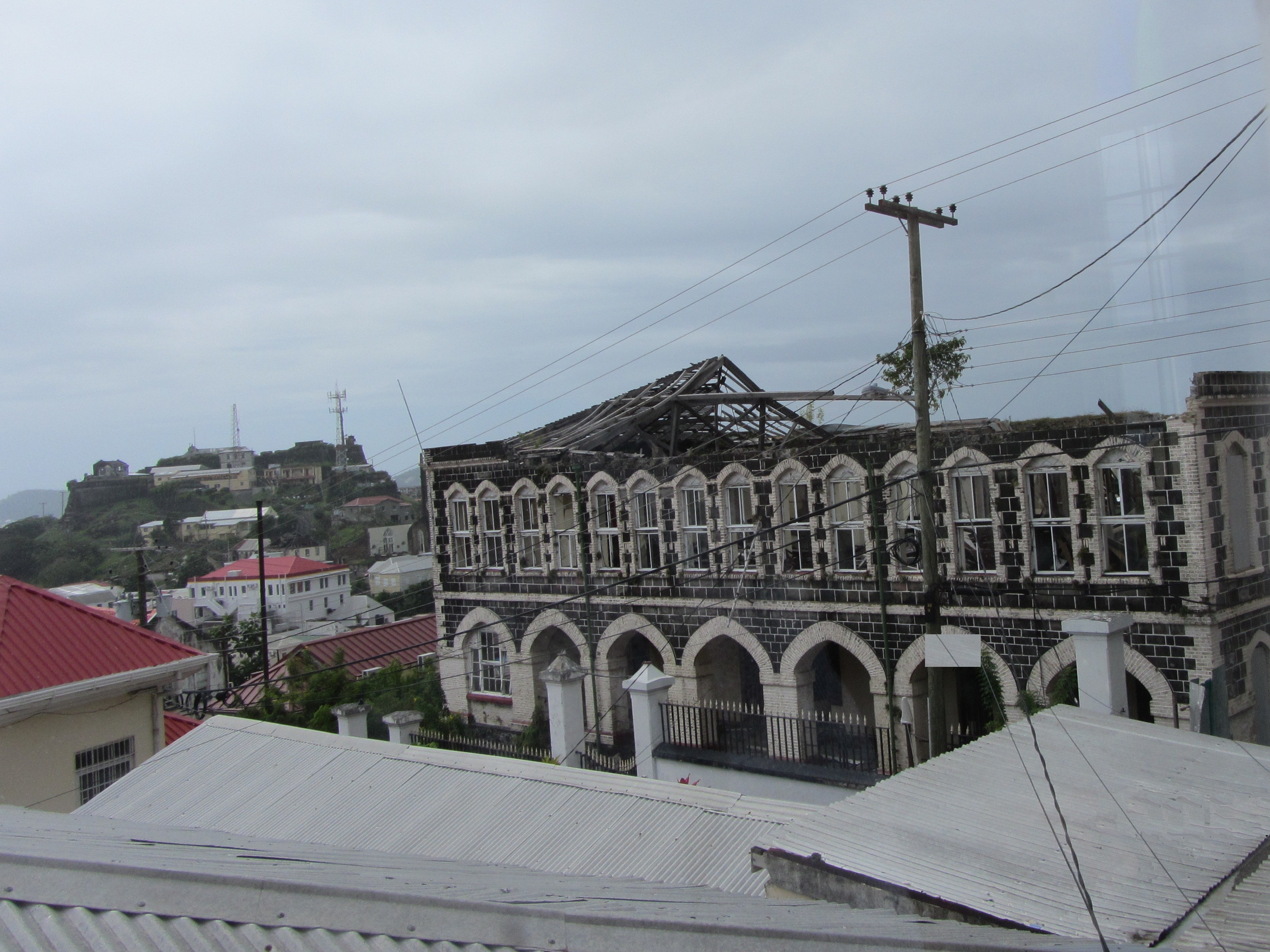
The view on 17 February 2012 from Immaculate Conception Cathedral.

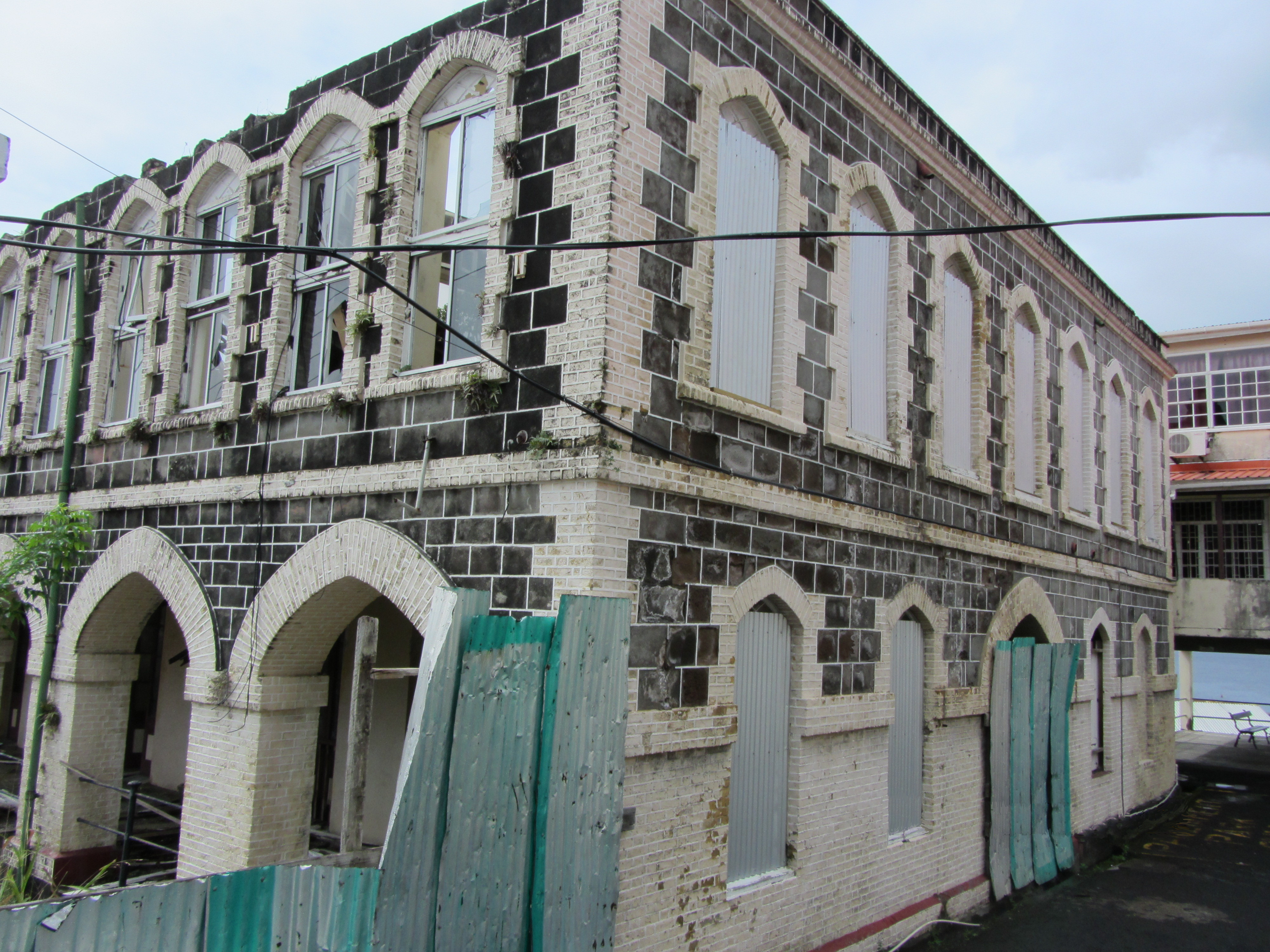
Parliament House on Church Street.

York House, also known as Parliament House, was a landmark in St. George's and the home of the Parliament of Grenada from the 19th century until it was destroyed by Hurricane Ivan in 2004. It was replaced by the New Parliament Building in 2010.

== History ==
The building was built in the 1770s and originally served as the residence of the Depontieu family. It was purchased by the Grenada government in 1801, becoming the seat of the colonial legislature. The building was named after the Duke of York who visited Grenada in the eighteenth century. Upon independence in 1974, it became home to the Parliament of Grenada. The Supreme Court occupied the lower floor of the building. Queen Elizabeth II, Queen of Grenada, visited the building in 1985, opening a special session of Parliament.

=== Damage and abandonment ===
The building was damaged by Hurricane Ivan in 2004, after which it was abandoned. Following the hurricane, it was envisaged that the Grenadian government would have York House restored. The legislature temporarily operated out of the Trade Center in St George's. In 2006, the government of Grenada hired Dr Trevor Holmes from the United Kingdom via the Commonwealth Secretariat to renovate the historic buildings damaged. However, Holmes left in 2008 due to the Grenadian government regularly blocking his attempts at being able to do anything for the buildings. Whilst the nearby Methodist Church and Roman Catholic cathedral were renovated using funds from private contributors, York House was left to the elements.

Eventually, the Grenadian government opted to construct a New Parliament Building instead of restoring York house as the seat of the Parliament of Grenada. The designs were finalised in 2012. Using contributions from other countries such as Mexico, Australia and the United Arab Emirates, the building was opened in 2018. York House was left in a state of neglect. In 2024, the government announced that they were looking at converting York House into 500 affordable residences.
