= Patrick Webster =

Patrick Webster OSB
- Archbishop of Castries
- Church: Catholic Church
- Archdiocese: Archdiocese of Castries
- In office: 18 November 1974 – 10 May 1979
- Predecessor: Charles Gachet
- Successor: Kelvin Felix
- Previous posts: Bishop of Saint George's in Grenada (1970-1974); Titular Bishop of Ottocium (1969-1970); Auxiliary Bishop of Saint George’s in Grenada (1969-1970)

Orders
- Ordination: 30 June 1957 by Justin James Field
- Consecration: 31 August 1969 by Gordon Anthony Pantin

Personal details
- Born: 24 April 1924 Castries, Saint Lucia, British Windward Islands, British Empire
- Died: 24 July 1989 (aged 65)

Patrick Webster, OSB (24 April 1924 – 24 July 1989) was a Saint Lucian Catholic prelate who served as Bishop of Saint George's in Grenada from 1974 to 1979. He was a member of the Benedictines. He born in 1924, ordained in 1957 and consecrated as a bishop on 31 August 1969. He later became Archbishop of Castries, the diocese where he was born. He died in 1989.
