= Minor Basilica of the Immaculate Conception =

Minor Basilica of the Immaculate Conception may refer to:

- Manila Cathedral, in Manila, Philippines
- Malolos Cathedral, in Malolos, Bulacan, Philippines
- Minor Basilica of the Immaculate Conception (Batangas City), Batangas, Philippines
- Cathedral Basilica of the Immaculate Conception in Castries, Saint Lucia
