= Immaculate Conception Cathedral, St. George's =

Coordinates: 12.053465°N 61.752135°W

Immaculate Conception Cathedral
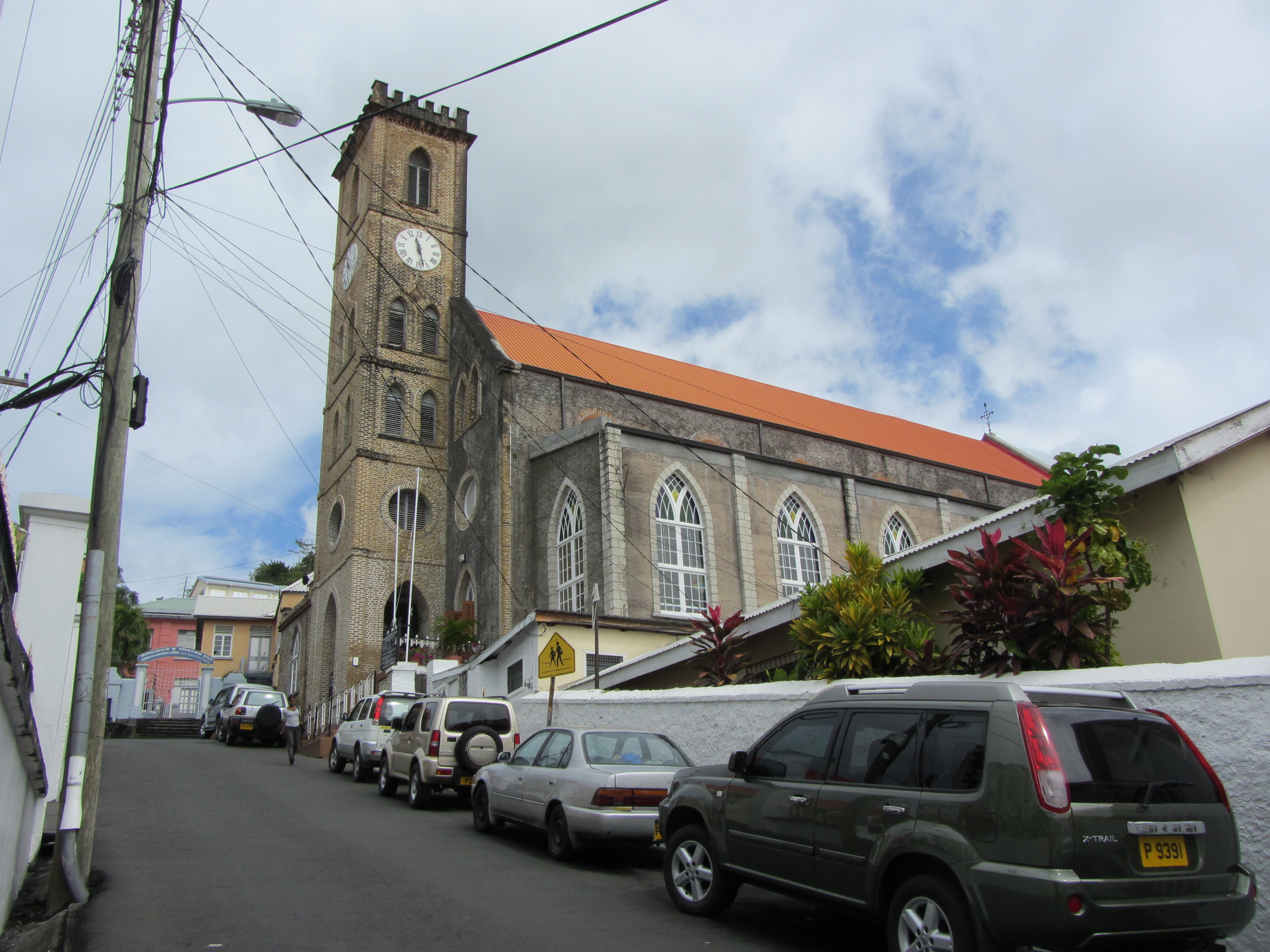
- Immaculate Conception Cathedral, St. George's
- Immaculate Conception Cathedral
- Location: St. George's
- Country: Grenada
- Denomination: Roman Catholic Church

The Immaculate Conception Cathedral is a religious building belonging to the Catholic Church and is located on Church Street beside York House in the town of Saint George, capital of the Caribbean island nation of Grenada in the Lesser Antilles.

It serves as the seat of the Catholic Diocese of Saint George (Dioecesis Sancti Georgii). The building is located atop a hill overlooking the harbor, and is one of the most important symbol of the city. In the place where it is now a small chapel existed previously completed in 1804 and dedicated to St James. The Gothic cathedral tower dates from 1818. The cathedral was completely finished in 1884.

The church had to be rebuilt because it was damaged after Hurricane Ivan in 2004. The church decoration is simple compared with European Catholic cathedrals.

== See also ==
- Roman Catholicism in Grenada ..The Cathedral was repaired after hurricane Ivan as it has lost the entire roof..only the belfry remained intact. SRM Architects (of Barbados) were commissioned to do the work, but first had to undertake a measured survey in order to draw a plan of the existing "footprint" to work from as no floor plans existed. The balcony was restored plus the Ground floor layout revised with columns to provide an uninterrupted view of the pulpit for the congregation seated in the wings. It has once again been opened to the citizens and also to the visitors from the cruise ships as it used to be.
