= Justin James Field =

English clergyman

Justin James Field OP
- Bishop of Saint George’s in Grenada
- Church: Catholic Church
- Diocese: Diocese of Saint George's in Grenada
- In office: 14 January 1957 – 4 August 1969
- Predecessor: Diocese erected
- Successor: Patrick Webster

Orders
- Ordination: 18 September 1926
- Consecration: 25 March 1957 by Patrick Finbar Ryan

Personal details
- Born: 6 July 1899 Down Hatherley, Gloucestershire, United Kingdom of Great Britain and Ireland
- Died: 4 August 1969 (aged 70)

Justin James Field (6 July 1899 in Down Hatherley – 4 August 1969) was an English clergyman and bishop for the Roman Catholic Diocese of Saint George's in Grenada. He was ordained in 1926. He was appointed bishop in 1957. He died in 1969.
