= Sydney Anicetus Charles =

Trinidadian Roman Catholic bishop (1926–2018)

- Diocese: Saint George's in Grenada
- Elected: 1975
- Retired: 2002

Personal details
- Born: 17 April 1926 Saint Joseph, Trinidad and Tobago
- Died: 4 September 2018 (aged 92) St. George's, Grenada
- Denomination: Roman Catholic

Sydney Anicetus Charles (17 April 1926 – 4 September 2018) was a Trinidadian Roman Catholic bishop. Charles was born in Trinidad and Tobago and was ordained to the priesthood in 1954. He served as bishop of the Roman Catholic Diocese of Saint George's in Grenada from 1975 to 2002.

== Early life ==
Charles was born on 17 April 1926 in Saint Joseph, Trinidad and Tobago. He was the 11th of 12 children.

== Career ==
In 1954, Charles was ordained as a priest for the Roman Catholic Archdiocese of Port of Spain. In 1975, Charles was consecrated as the third Bishop of the Roman Catholic Diocese of Saint George's in Grenada. In 2014, Charles celebrated 60 years of priesthood.

== Death ==
Charles died on 4 September 2018 at the General Hospital in St. George's, Grenada.
