= Diocese of Saint George's in Grenada =

Latin Catholic ecclesiastical jurisdiction in the Caribbean

Coordinates: 12.0538°N 61.7522°W

Diocese of Saint George's in Grenada Dioecesis Sancti Georgii
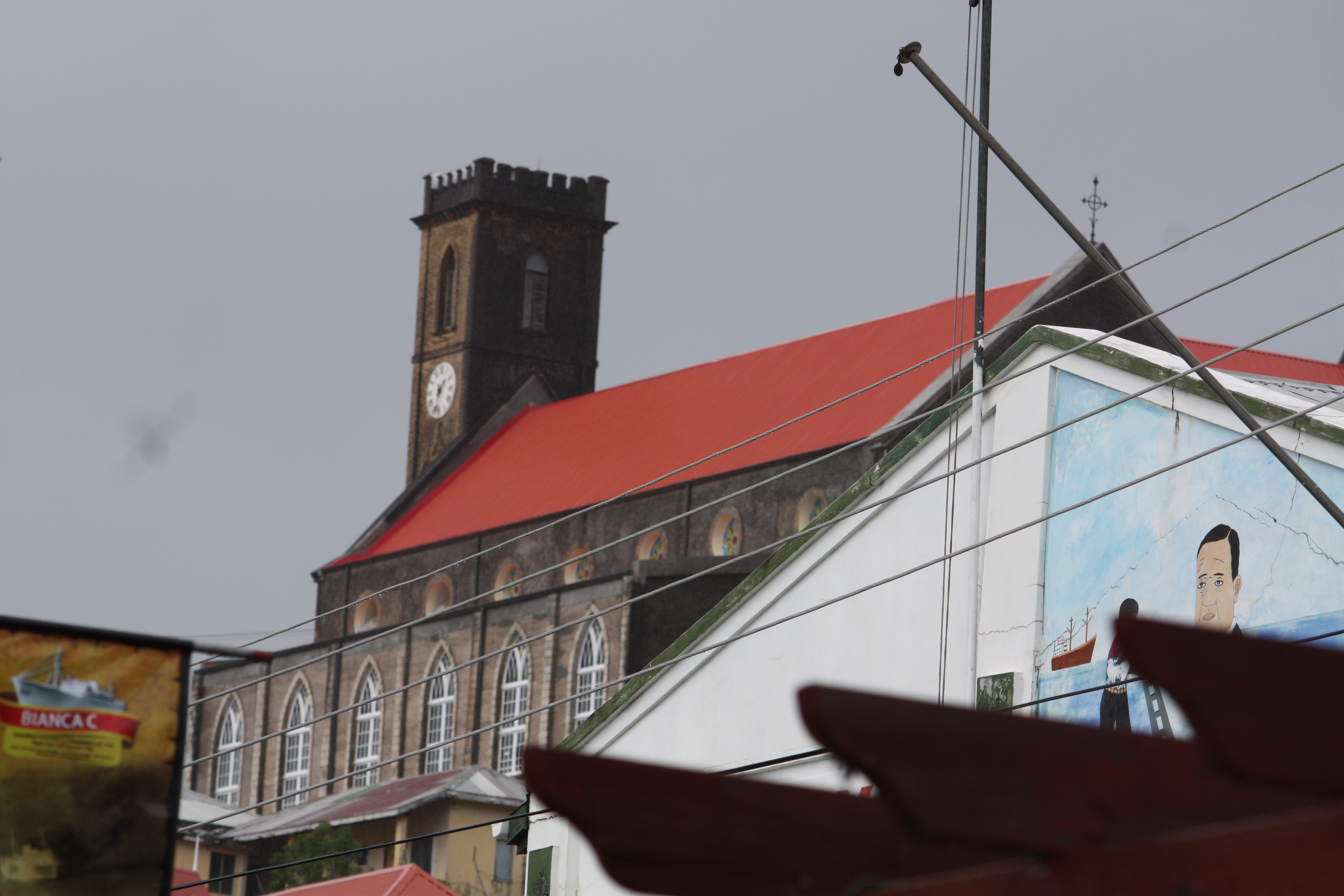
- Cathedral of the Immaculate Conception

Location
- Country: Grenada
- Ecclesiastical province: Castries

Statistics
- Area: 340 km^{2} (130 sq mi)
- Population: Total; Catholics: (as of 2014); 102,295; 46,485 (45.4%)
- Parishes: 20 (1 mission)
- Churches: 61

Information
- Denomination: Roman Catholic
- Rite: Latin Rite
- Established: 20 February 1956 (70 years ago)
- Cathedral: Immaculate Conception Cathedral, St. George's
- Patron saint: The Blessed Virgin Mary
- Secular priests: 7

Current leadership
- Pope: Leo XIV
- Bishop: sede vacante
- Metropolitan Archbishop: Gabriel Malzaire
- Bishops emeritus: Clyde Martin Harvey

Website
- catholicgnd.org
- 1.Most statistics from GCatholic.org 2.Coat of arms (of the Bishop), Catholic Diocese of Saint George's in Grenada

The Roman Catholic Diocese of St. George's in Grenada (Latin: Dioecesis Sancti Georgii) is a diocese of the Catholic Church that encompasses only and the entirety of Grenada. It is a suffragan of the Metropolitan Archdiocese of Castries (Saint Lucia) and a member of the Antilles Episcopal Conference. The diocese depends on the Dicastery for Evangelization.

Its episcopal see is the Immaculate Conception Cathedral, in the national capital of St. George's.

== History ==
- It was erected on 20 February 1956 as Diocese of St. George's in Grenada, on British Antillian territory split off from the Metropolitan Archdiocese of Port of Spain
- It lost territory on 1970.03.07 to establish the Diocese of Bridgetown-Kingstown.

== Statistics ==
As per 2014, it pastorally served 46,485 Catholics (45.4% of 102,295 total) on 340 km² in 20 parishes and 1 mission with 23 priests (7 diocesan, 16 religious), 8 deacons and 53 lay religious (20 brothers, 33 sisters) .

== Bishops ==
(all Roman Rite)

=== Episcopal Ordinaries ===
Suffragan Bishops of Saint George's in Grenada

- Justin James Field, Dominican Order (O.P.) (born England, UK) (1957.01.14 – death 1969.08.04)
- Patrick Webster, Benedictine Order (O.S.B.) (born Saint Lucia) (1970.03.07 – 1974.11.18), succeeding as former Titular Bishop of Otočac (1969.06.26 – 1970.03.07), Auxiliary Bishop of Saint George's in Grenada (1969.06.26 – 1970.03.07) and Apostolic Administrator of Saint George's in Grenada (1969.08.05 – 1970.03.07); later Metropolitan Archbishop of Castries (Saint Lucia) (1974.11.18 – retired 1979.05.10), died 1989
- Sydney Anicetus Charles (born Trinidad and Tobago) (1974.11.18 – retired 2002.07.10 - died 2018.09.04
- Vincent (Matthew) Darius, O.P. (born Grenada) (2002.07.10 – death 2016.04.26)
- Clyde Martin Harvey (born Trinidad and Tobago) (2017.06.23 – 2026.06.09), no previous prelature.

=== Auxiliary bishop ===
- Patrick Webster, O.S.B. (1969-1970), appointed Bishop here

== See also ==
- List of Catholic dioceses in Grenada

== Sources and external links ==
- GCatholic with Google map - data for all section
- "Diocese of Saint George's in Grenada". Catholic-Hierarchy.
