= Castries Market =

Market in Castries, Saint Lucia

Coordinates: 14.0118°N 60.9894°W

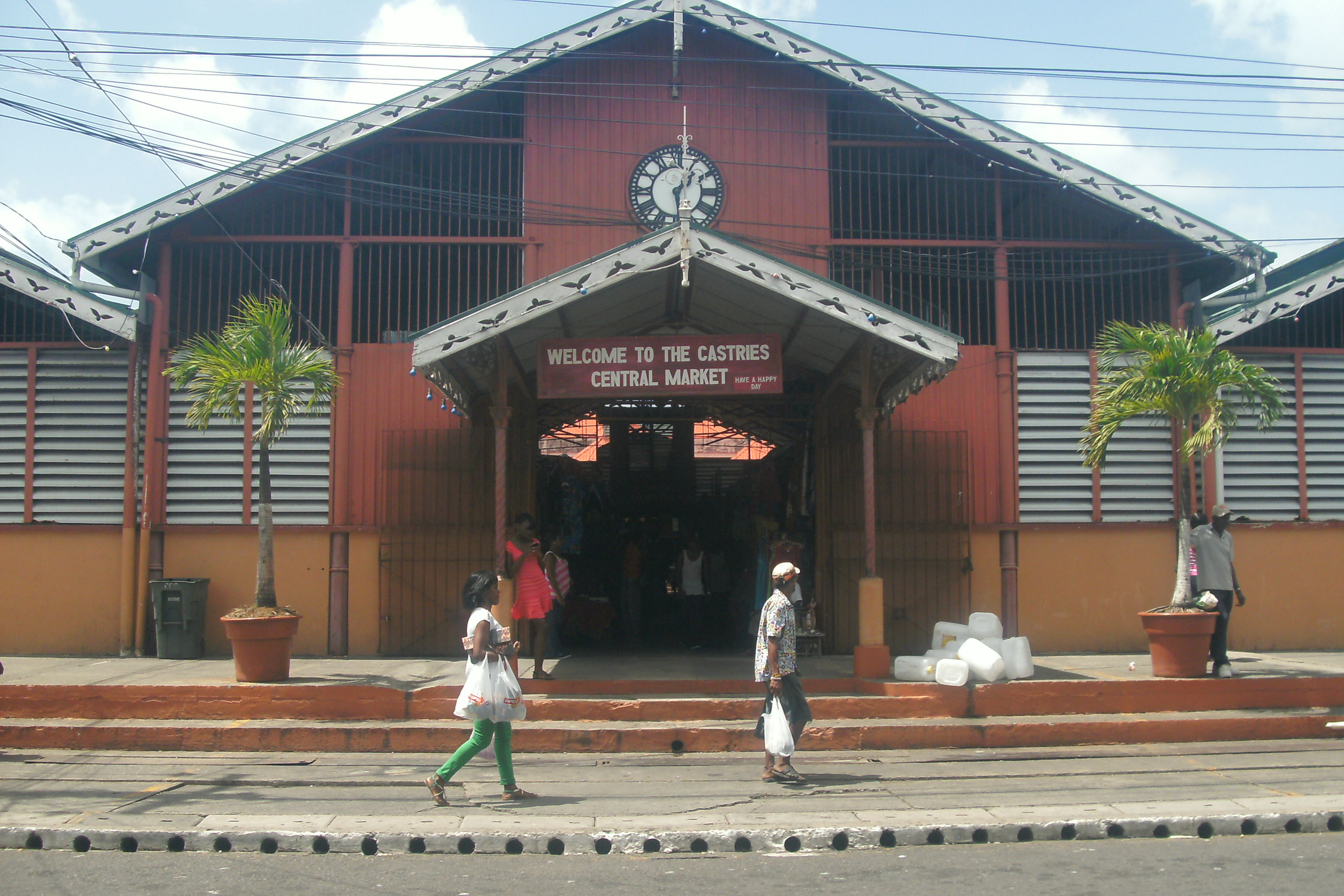
Castries Market as seen from Jeremie Street

The Castries Market and Vendor's Arcade is the largest open-air market in Castries, Saint Lucia. It is located in the middle of the capital and has over 300 regular vendors and a hundred or more local sellers on market days.

The market was constructed in 1891 by building engineers Bruce & Still Ltd., of Liverpool. It was originally built to improve the town's appearance and was opened by Sir Charles Bruce on July 2, 1894. The building became the central place for selling a variety of goods such as: fresh meat and fish, herbs, spices, crafts and dry goods.

Fish is no longer being sold and meat isn't slaughtered on the premises, but the market has become the central hub for buying almost anything (natural produce and goods). In an effort to relieve congestion in the sidewalks, the Castries City Council opened a Vendor's Arcade annex in 1996. There, tourists can try the cuisine of local restaurants, buy frozen meat or purchase crafts made on site.
