= St. Joseph the Worker Church, Gros Islet =

Coordinates: 14.0818°N 60.9526°W

St. Joseph the Worker Church
- St. Joseph the Worker Church
- Location: Gros Islet
- Country: Saint Lucia
- Denomination: Roman Catholic Church

The St. Joseph the Worker Church is a religious building belonging to the Catholic Church and is located in the town of Gros Islet in the district of the same name on the northern tip of Saint Lucia.

The parish follows the Roman or Latin rite and is part of the Metropolitan Archdiocese of Castries (Archidioecesis Castriensis). Its history dates back to the first missionaries who arrived on the scene in 1749, although not known precisely the date on which was built the first church believed it was in 1771. In 1778 the chapel was replaced by a church. In 1850 the construction of another church that was completed in 1876 being dedicated to Saint Joseph. The present church was consecrated in 1967.

== See also ==
- Catholic Church in Saint Lucia
- St. Joseph the Worker Church (Macau)
