= Santa Maria della Salute a Primavalle =

- Our Lady of Health in Primavalle (in English); S. Mariæ Salutis in regione vulgo Primavalle (in Latin)
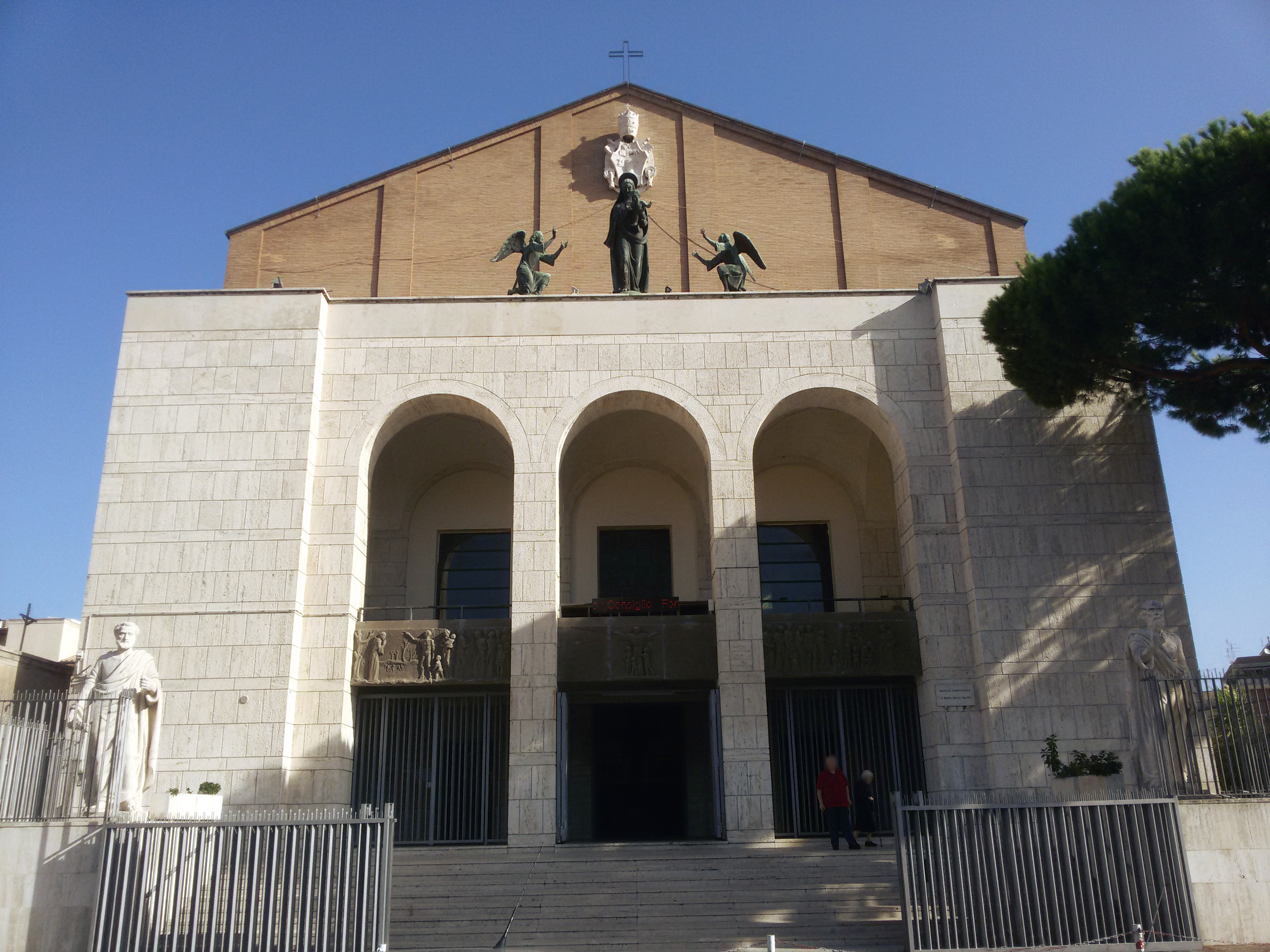
- Façade
- Click on the map for a fullscreen view
- 41°55′16″N 12°24′56″E
- Location: Via Tommaso De Vio 5, Rome
- Country: Italy
- Denomination: Roman Catholic
- Tradition: Roman Rite
- Website: parrocchiasantamariadellasalute.weebly.com

History
- Status: Titular church
- Dedication: Mary, mother of Jesus (as Our Lady of Health)

Architecture
- Architect: Giorgio Guidi
- Architectural type: Church
- Style: Rationalist

The church of Santa Maria della Salute in Primavalle is a church in Rome, in the Primavalle district, in the square Alfonso Capecelatro.

== History ==
It was built in the twentieth century by the architect Giorgio Guidi and consecrated 18 March 1960 by Cardinal Luigi Traglia. Pope John Paul II visited the church 15 November 1981.

The church is home parish, erected 30 September 1950 with the decree of the Cardinal Vicar Francesco Marchetti Selvaggiani Inter plures vicos and entrusted to the Franciscan Friars of the Third Order Regular of St. Francis.

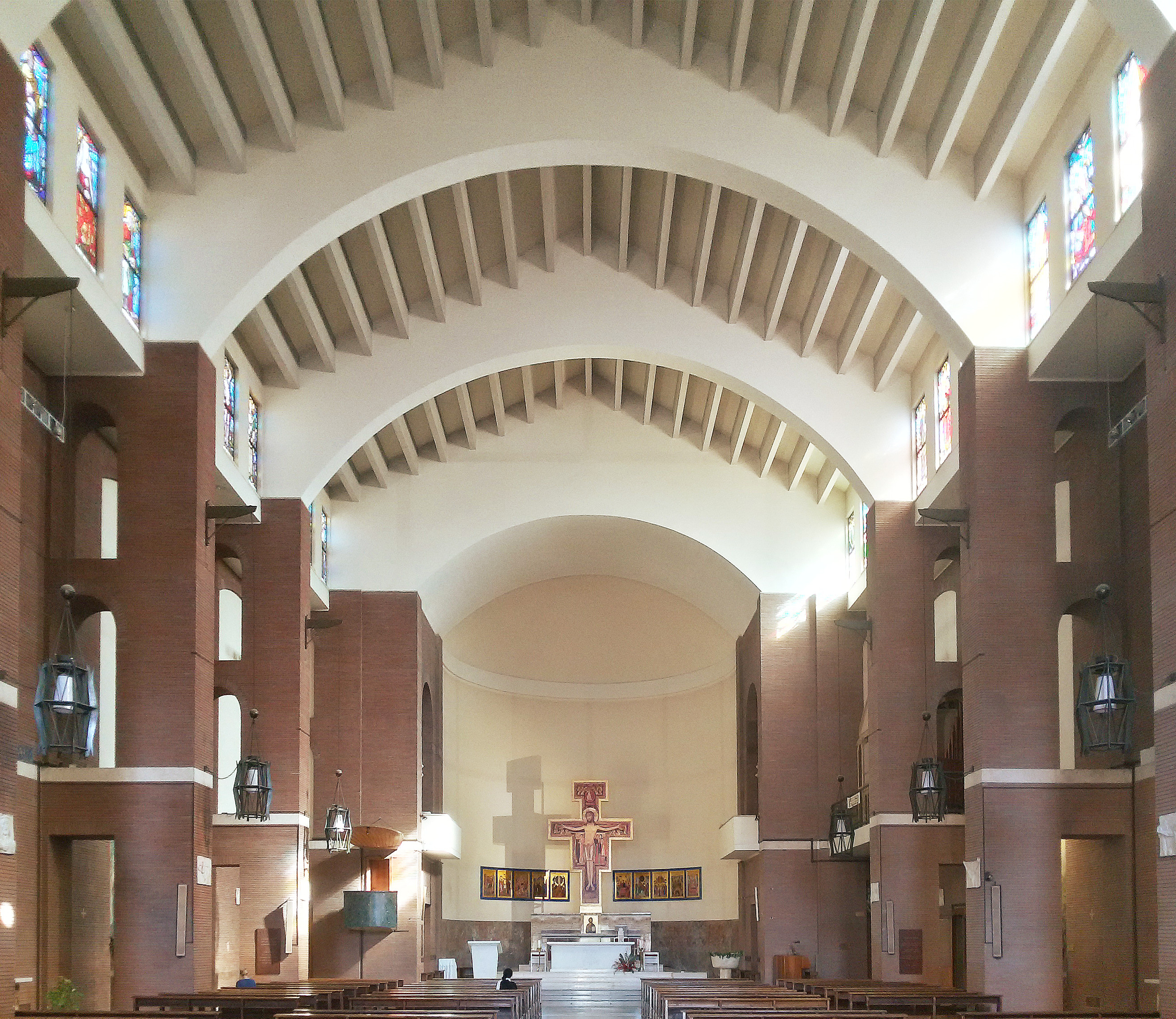
Interior

== List of Cardinal Protectors ==
- George Bernard Flahiff 30 April 1969 – 22 August 1989
- Antonio Quarracino 28 June 1991 – 28 February 1998
- Jean Honore 21 February 2001 – 28 February 2013
- Kelvin Edward Felix 22 February 2014 – 30 May 2024
- Francis Leo 7 December 2024 – Current
