= Derek Walcott Square =

Public square and park in Castries, Saint Lucia

Coordinates: 14°0′31″N 60°59′26″W

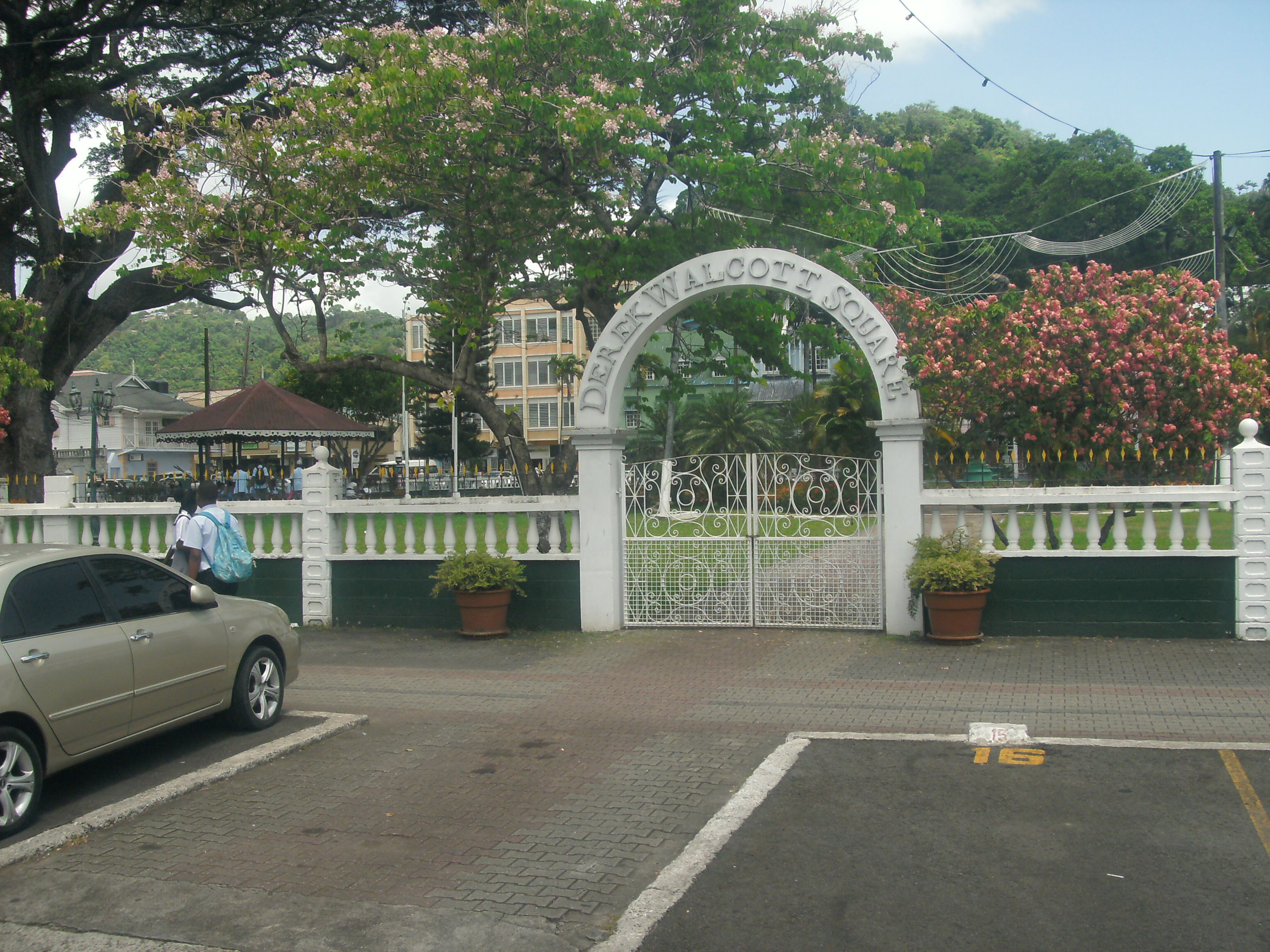
Derek Walcott Square seen from Micoud Street

Derek Walcott Square (formerly Columbus Square) is a public square and park located in central Castries, Saint Lucia.

The square is bounded by Bourbon, Brazil, Laborie and Micoud Streets.

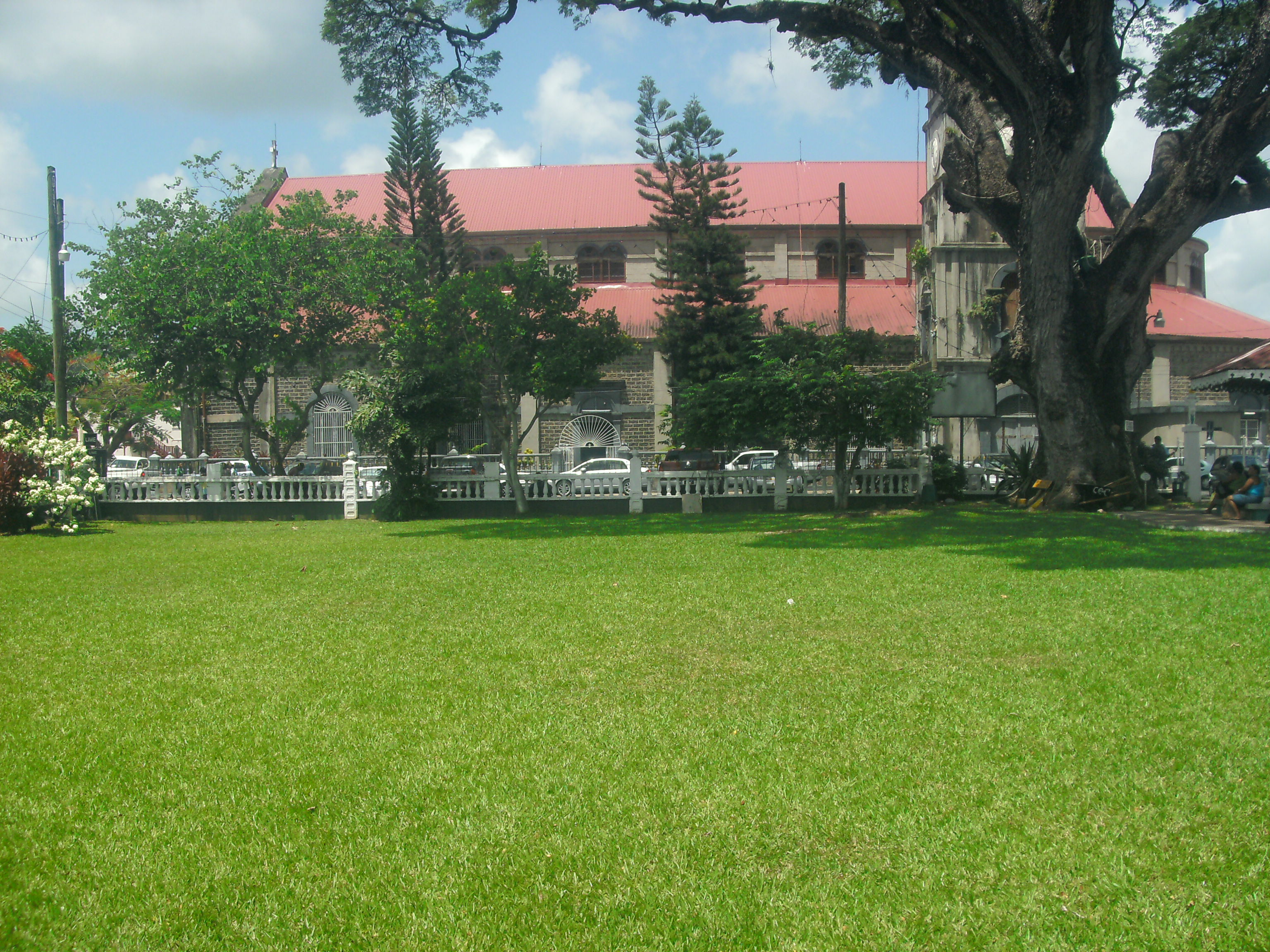
Derek Walcott Square in Castries, Saint Lucia with the Basilica of the Immaculate Conception in the background

The Cathedral of the Immaculate Conception and the Castries Central Library are located at the square.

The square was previously named Place d'Armes and Promenade Square. It was named Columbus Square in 1892. In 1993, it was named Derek Walcott Square after the Nobel laureate Derek Walcott.

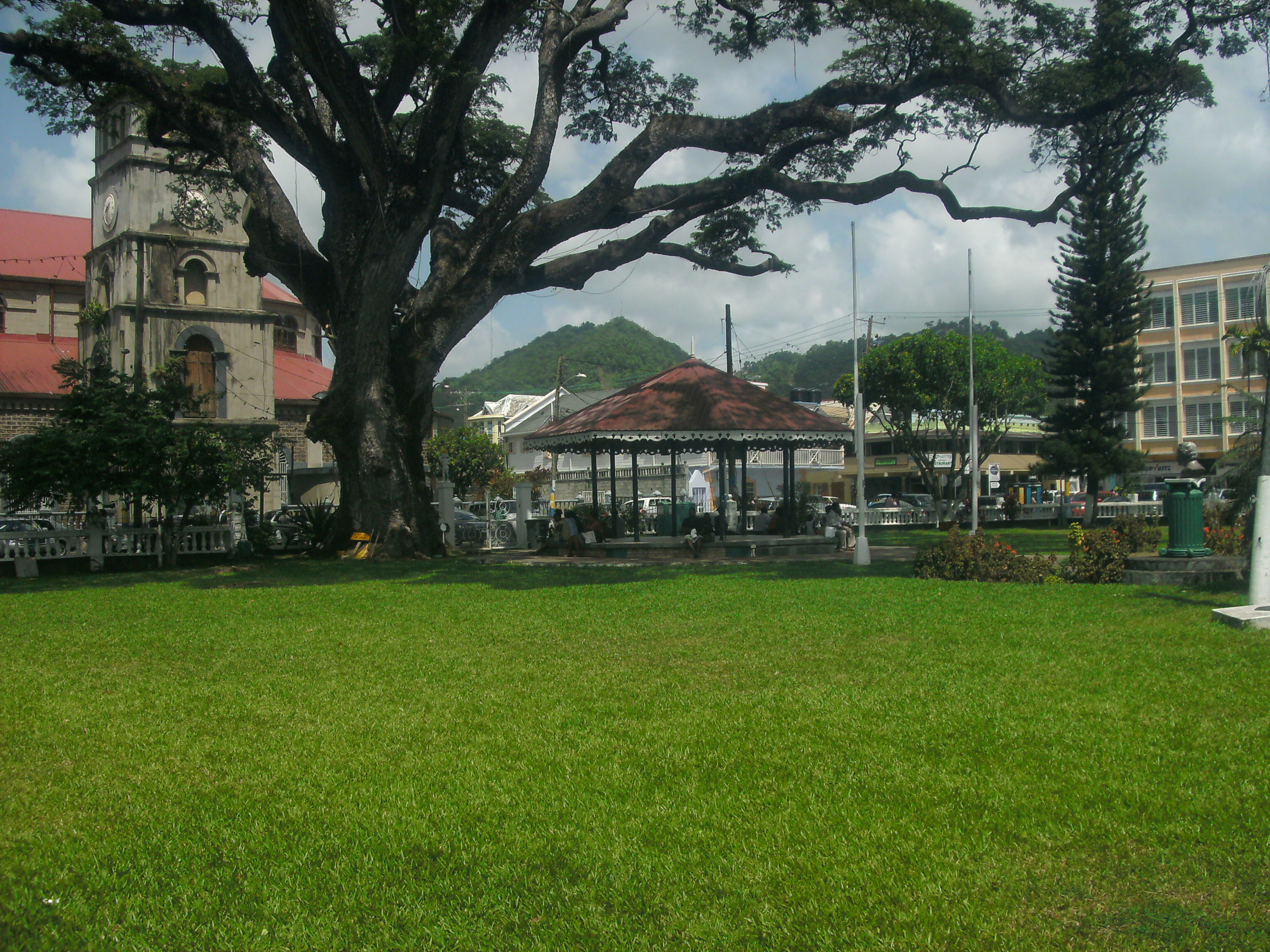
Bandstand at Derek Walcott Square
