= Clyde Harvey =

Trinidadian bishop

Clyde Martin Harvey
- Bishop Emeritus of Saint George’s in Grenada
- Church: Catholic Church
- Diocese: Diocese of Saint George's in Grenada
- In office: 23 June 2017 – 9 June 2026
- Predecessor: Vincent Darius
- Successor: Gabriel Malzaire (as Apostolic Administrator)

Orders
- Ordination: 27 June 1976 by Gordon Anthony Pantin
- Consecration: 29 July 2017 by Nicola Girasoli

Personal details
- Born: 9 November 1948 (age 77) Port of Spain, Colony of Trinidad and Tobago, British Empire

Clyde Martin Harvey (born 9 November 1948, in Port of Spain) is a Trinidad and Tobago prelate of the Catholic Church and bishop emeritus of the Diocese of Saint George's in Grenada. He was ordained in 1976. He was appointed bishop in 2017.
