= Catholic Church in Grenada =

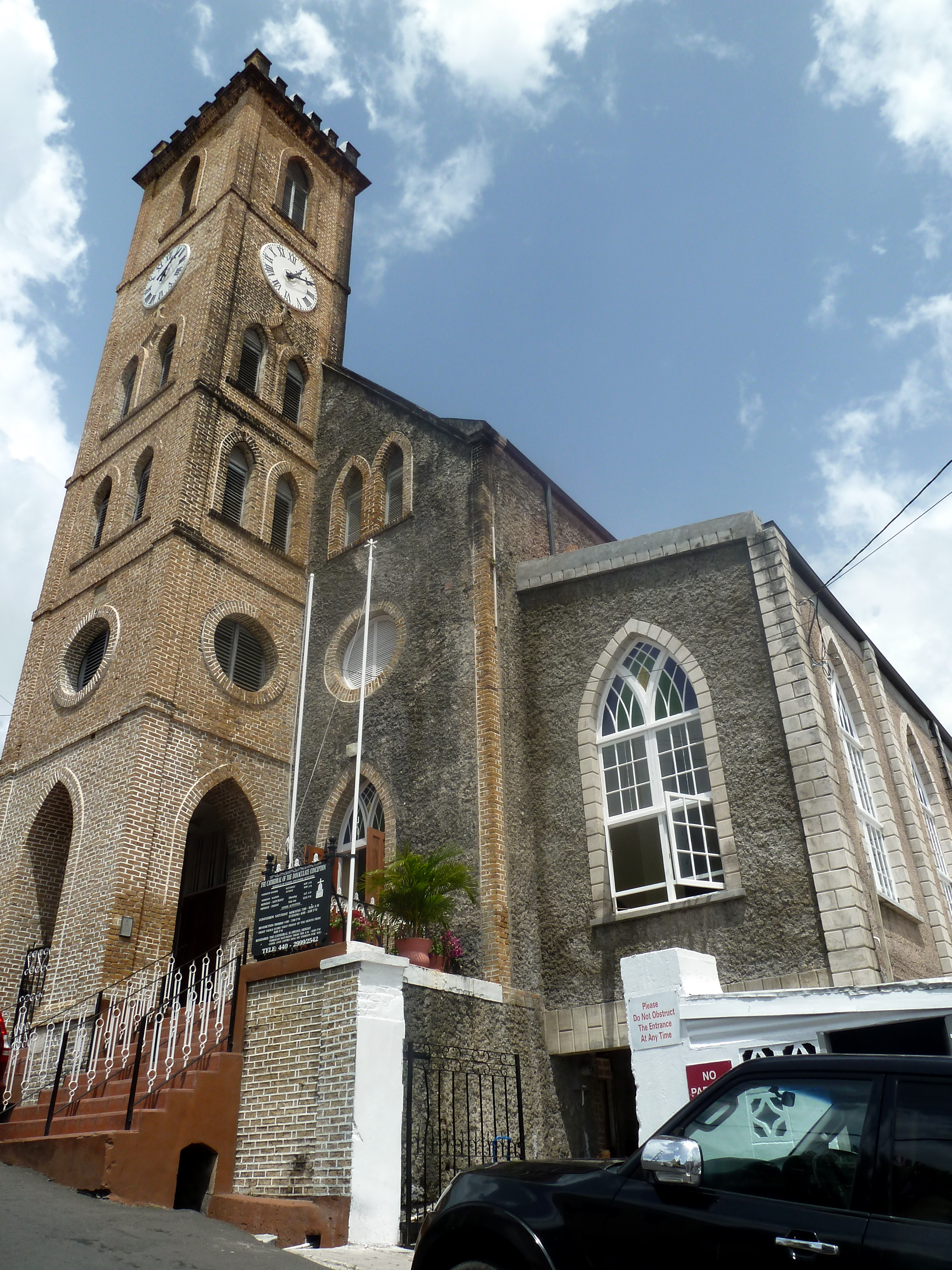
Cathedral of the Immaculate Conception in St. George's, Grenada

The Catholic Church in Grenada is part of the worldwide Catholic Church, under the spiritual leadership of the Pope in Rome.

Catholicism is practised by 35.95% of the country’s population, according to the 2011 census, but this marks a decline from 44.19% in 2001, showing an 8.24 % drop. There are 37,941 Catholics in Grenada. The country forms a single diocese: the Diocese of St George's in Grenada, led by Bishop Clyde Martin Harvey.
