= Archdiocese of Castries =

Latin Catholic ecclesiastical jurisdiction in the Caribbean

Coordinates: 14.0089°N 60.9901°W

Metropolitan Archdiocese of Castries Archidioecesis Metropolitae Castriensis
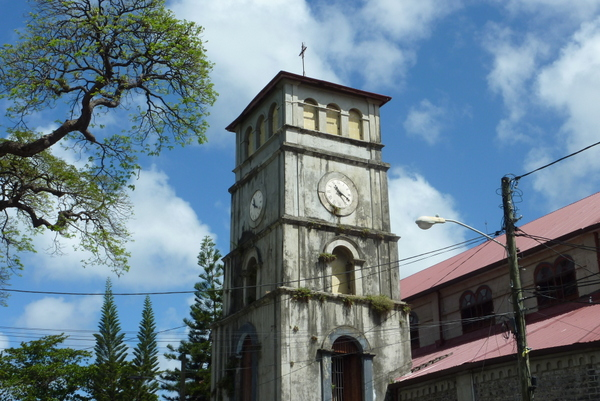
- Cathedral Basilica of the Immaculate Conception

Location
- Country: St. Lucia

Statistics
- Area: 616 km^{2} (238 sq mi)
- Population: Total; Catholics: (as of 2016); 181,273; 105,256 (58.1%)

Information
- Denomination: Catholic
- Sui iuris church: Latin Church
- Rite: Roman RiteLatin Rite
- Cathedral: Cathedral Basilica of the Immaculate Conception in Castries

Current leadership
- Pope: Leo XIV
- Metropolitan Archbishop: Gabriel Malzaire
- Vicar General: Michel Francis
- Episcopal Vicars: Athanase Joseph
- Judicial Vicar: Joseph Raj
- Bishops emeritus: Robert Rivas

Website
- aoc.slu.org

The Metropolitan Archdiocese of Castries (Latin: Archidioecesis Metropolitae Castriensis) is an archdiocese of the Latin Church of the Catholic Church in the Caribbean. The archdiocese consists of the entirety of the former British dependency of Saint Lucia and is a metropolitan see, the suffragans of the Castries Province being the Dioceses of Roseau, Saint George's in Grenada, St. John's-Basseterre and Kingstown. The archdiocese is a member of the Antilles Episcopal Conference.

Erected as the Diocese of Castries in 1956 from its then-metropolitan see of Port of Spain, it was elevated to archdiocese in November 1974.

The current archbishop is Gabriel Malzaire The cathedral is the Cathedral Basilica of the Immaculate Conception, a minor basilica located in Derek Walcott Square, Castries.

== Bishops ==
=== Metropolitan Archbishops of Castries ===
- Charles Alphonse H.J. Gachet, F.M.I. (1957–1974)
- Patrick Webster, O.S.B. (1974–1979)
- Kelvin Edward Felix (1981–2008); elevated to Cardinal in 2014
- Robert Rivas, O.P. (2008–2022)
- Gabriel Malzaire, C.M.G (2022–present)

=== Coadjutor Archbishops ===
- Robert Rivas, O.P. (2007-2008).

=== Another priest of this diocese who became bishop ===
- Gabriel Malzaire, appointed Bishop of Roseau, Dominica, Antilles in 2002

== Parishes ==
- Cathedral Basilica of the Immaculate Conception, Castries
- St. Joseph the Worker Church, Gros Islet
- Good Shepherd, Babonneau
- St Rose of Lima, Monchy
- Grand Riviere Catholic Church, Grand Riviere
- Our Lady of Rosary of the Fatima, La Clery
- Sacred Heart of Jesus, Marchand
- St Benedict, Castries
- St Michael, La Ressource Dennery
- Most Pure Heart of Mary, Bexon
- Holy Family, Jacmel
- St Peter, Dennery Village
- Nativity of the Blessed Virgin Mary, Anse-La-Raye
- Coubaril Church, Castries
- St Anne, Mon Repos
- St Lucy National Shrine, Micoud
- Holy Cross, Desruisseaux
- St Isidore, Bellevue, Vieux Fort
- St Martin de Porres, Pierrot, Vieux Fort
- Our Lady of Grace, Grace, Vieux Fort
- Holy Redeemer Chapel, Dierre Morne, Vieux Fort
- Assumption of the Blessed Virgin Mary, Vieux Fort
- St Francis Xavier, Augier
- Purification of the Blessed Virgin Mary, Laborie
- Our Lady of Lourdes, Chosuiel
- Our Lady of Assumption, Soufriere
- Victoria, Dugard
- St Philip and St James, Fond St Jaccques
- Canaries Catholic Church, Canaries
