= Robert Rivas (bishop) =

Trinidadian Roman Catholic prelate (1946–2026)

The Most Reverend Robert Rivas OP
- Archbishop Emeritus of Castries
- See: Castries
- Appointed: 19 July 2007
- Installed: 15 February 2008
- Term ended: 11 February 2022
- Predecessor: Kelvin Felix
- Successor: Gabriel Malzaire
- Previous posts: Bishop of Kingstown (1989–2007); Apostolic Administrator of Bridgetown (2005–2011); Coadjutor Archbishop of Castries (2007–2008); Apostolic Administrator of Kingstown (2007–2011)

Orders
- Ordination: 17 June 1971 by Gordon Anthony Pantin
- Consecration: 22 January 1990 by Manuel Monteiro de Castro, Gordon Anthony Pantin and Kelvin Felix

Personal details
- Born: 7 June 1946 La Pastora, Trinidad and Tobago
- Died: 27 September 2026 (aged 80)
- Denomination: Roman Catholic
- Motto: Via veritas vita ('The Way, the Truth, the Life')

Styles of Robert Rivas
- Reference style: The Most Reverend
- Spoken style: Your Excellency
- Religious style: Archbishop

Robert Rivas OP (7 June 1946 – 27 September 2026) was a Trinidadian prelate of the Catholic Church who was archbishop of Castries in St. Lucia from 2008 to 2022.

== Early life ==
Rivas was born in the village of La Pastora, Arouca, Trinidad and Tobago, on 7 June 1946. He was the son of the late Sabina and Placido Rivas, and had one sister and five brothers. Having completed his secondary studies in the Dominican College of Holy Cross, Arima, he entered the novitiate of the Irish Province of the Dominican Order in St. Mary's Priory, Cork, Ireland, and subsequently to the Dominican House of Studies, in St. Mary's, Tallaght, Dublin.

After ordination in the Cathedral of the Immaculate Conception, Port of Spain, by Archbishop Anthony Pantin on 27 June 1971, he went to the Pontifical University of St. Thomas Aquinas (Angelicum), Rome, where he obtained the Licence in Theology.

After Rome, he returned to Ireland where he successfully completed a course in radio and television production and received a diploma in communications.

== Career ==
On his return to Trinidad and Tobago he spent his first two years of ministry at St Theresa’s, Woodbrook, Port of Spain, under the direction of the future master of the Order of Preachers, Rev. Damian Byrne. He continued in parish ministry for another three years in South and North East Trinidad. The following years were devoted to involvement in social communications, campus ministry at the University of the West Indies, St Augustine Campus, and the formation of young Dominicans for the priesthood and religious life. During this time he completed a programme in spiritual direction.

From 1985 to 1989, in addition to his work in formation, he served as a special Delegate of the Master of the Dominican Order in Rome, to promote the unity of the order among the vicariates in the Caribbean. He was the first Dominican in the Caribbean to be appointed to this position.

On 28 October 1989, his appointment as the first bishop of the newly created Diocese of Kingstown in St Vincent and the Grenadines was announced in Rome. He was consecrated Bishop of Kingstown on 22 January 1990. He has the distinction of being the first Caribbean-born Dominican to become a bishop in the West Indies in 500 years of evangelisation. On May 31, 2005, he was appointed Apostolic Administrator of the Diocese of Bridgetown, Barbados.

As he approached his retirement age, Archbishop Kelvin Felix of the Archdiocese of Castries requested of the Vatican that a co-adjutor archbishop be appointed to ensure a smooth transition in the Archdiocese. On 19 July 2007, Bishop Robert Rivas of the Diocese of Kingstown was appointed Co-adjutor Archbishop of the Diocese of Castries. He was presented on 14 October 2007.

== Death ==
Rivas died in his sleep on 27 September 2026, at the age of 80.

== Activities ==
Rivas served as the chairperson of the Family and Life Commission for the Antilles Episcopal Conference (AEC), as a member of the Commission for Social Communications (Decos), of the Council of Bishops of Latin America (CELAM) and the chairperson of the National Committee Against Violence in St Vincent and the Grenadines (SVG). He served as President of the St Vincent and the Grenadines Christian Council, Chairperson of the National Monitoring and Consultative Mechanism (NMCM), the National Consultative Committee (NCC) and the Police Oversight Committee.

He also served as visitator of the Regional Seminary of St John Vianney and the Uganda Martyrs and as a member of the Pontifical Council for Latin America (CAL). Rivas was the vice president of the National Committee on Crime Prevention (NCCP) and President of the SVG Christian Council. He was the chairman of Board of the Regional Seminary, chairman of the AEC Youth Commission and a member of the AEC Liturgical Commission. Rivas preached extensively, promoting the missions through Mission Appeals in the United States as well as conducting parish missions and retreats for clergy and religious within the Caribbean and the continental US.

Rivas was the editor of the Catholic Way, a diocesan publication, produced his first Pastoral Letter for the Jubilee Year 2000, and published the documents of Assembly ’90 and ’98 which are significant documents outlining the Pastoral Plan and development for the Diocese of Kingstown. He was the founding bishop of the Diocese of Kingstown.

As an international speaker he addressed the National Conference of the Cursillo Movement in the US, National Conference of Charismatic Renewal in US, Couples for Christ in the US and the Caribbean, the National Conference for the Directors of the Pontifical Mission Societies in the US, International Conference for Priests in Medjugorje as well as a Festival for Youth from all over the world in Medjugorje.

He also addressed an OAS Conference at the Second Assembly of the Association of Caribbean Electoral Organizations in Jamaica on the “Role of Civil Society and Political Parties in the Electoral Process”. Rivas was also a speaker at World Youth Day in Toronto, Canada (2002). He addressed the Union of Bicol Priests in Naga City, Philippines in 2006.

Catholic Church titles
Preceded by Kelvin Felix	Archbishop of Castries; 2008–2022	Succeeded by Gabriel Malzaire
Preceded by Position established	Bishop of Kingstown; 1989–2007	Succeeded by Charles Jason Gordon
