= Gabriel Malzaire =

Catholic bishop

The Most Reverend Gabriel Malzaire CMG
- Metropolitan Archbishop of Castries
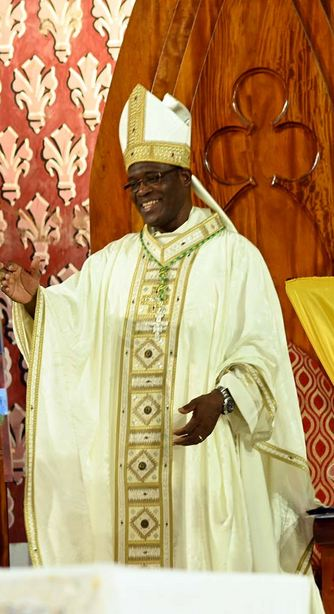
- See: Castries
- Appointed: 11 February 2022
- Installed: 24 April 2022
- Predecessor: Robert Rivas, O.P.

Orders
- Ordination: 28 July 1985
- Consecration: 4 October 2002 by Kelvin Edward Felix

Personal details
- Born: 4 October 1957 (age 68) Mon Repos, Saint Lucia
- Denomination: Roman Catholic
- Motto: All I want is to know Jesus Christ

Styles of Gabriel Malzaire
- Reference style: The Most Reverend
- Spoken style: Your Excellency
- Religious style: Archbishop

Gabriel Malzaire CMG (born 4 October 1957 in Mon Repos, Saint Lucia) is a Saint Lucian clergyman and Metropolitan Archbishop of Castries. He was ordained in 1985 and was appointed bishop in 2002. While he had previously opposed efforts to repeal laws against homosexuality in Roseau, in 2021 he changed course and began to support efforts to repeal them. On 11 February 2022, he was appointed Metropolitan Archbishop of Castries, to be installed on 24 April.

He was appointed a Companion of the Order of St Michael and St George (CMG) in the 2023 Birthday Honours for "services to Community Development."
