= Castries =

Capital and largest city of Saint Lucia

- City
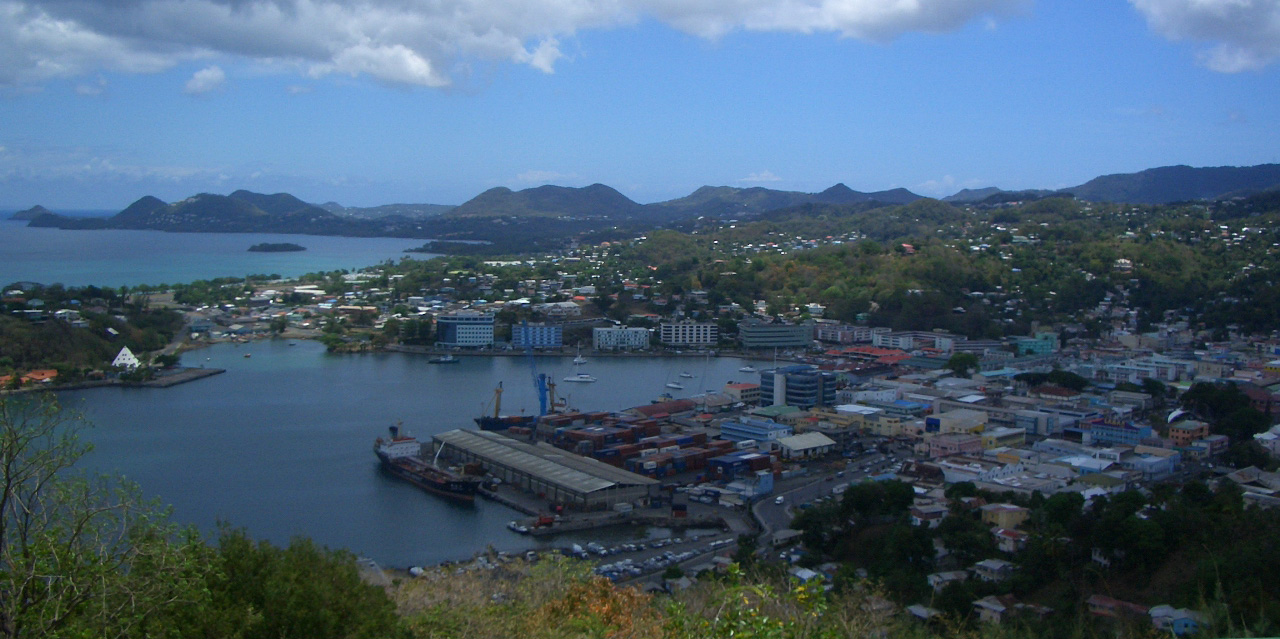
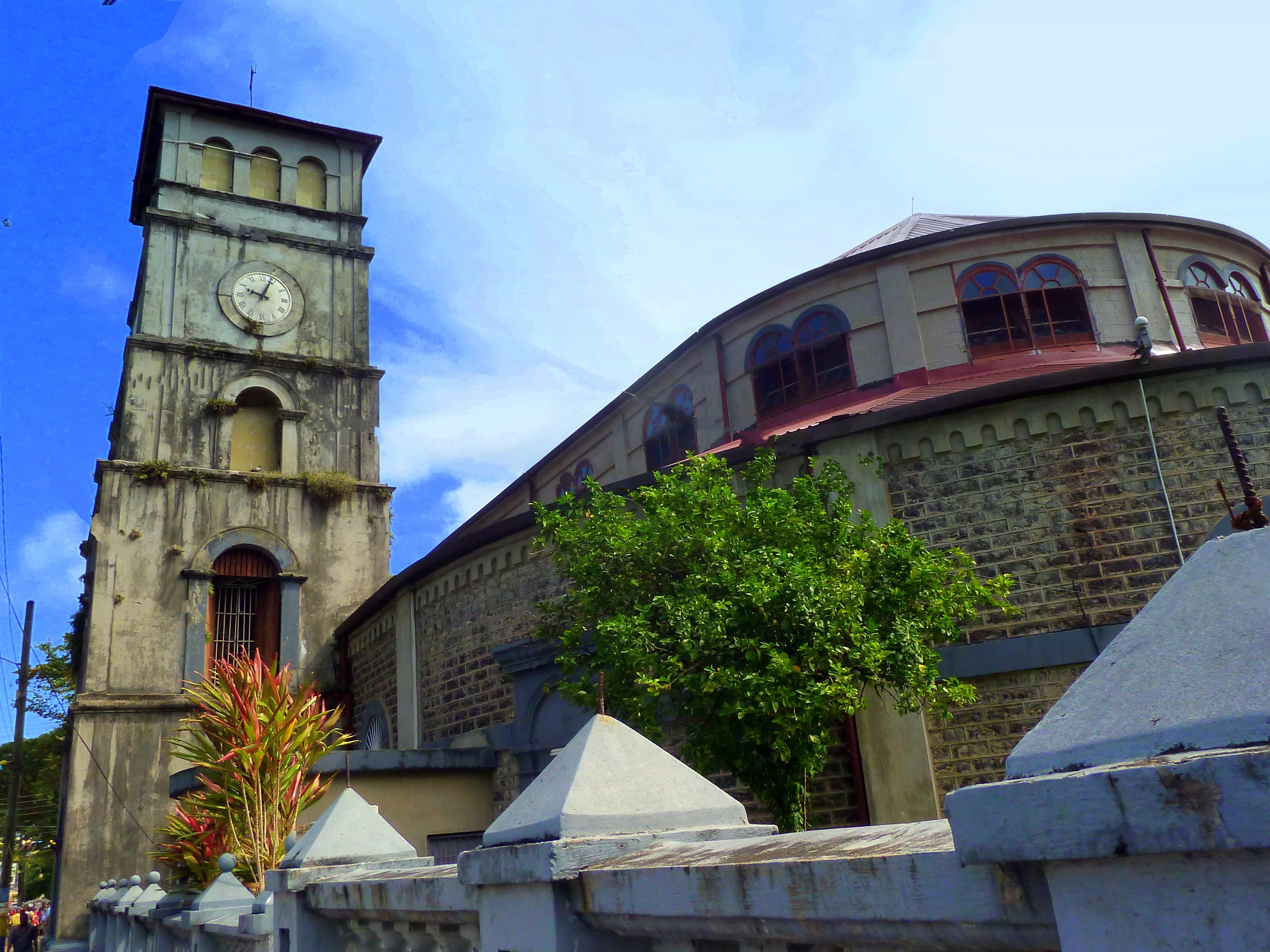
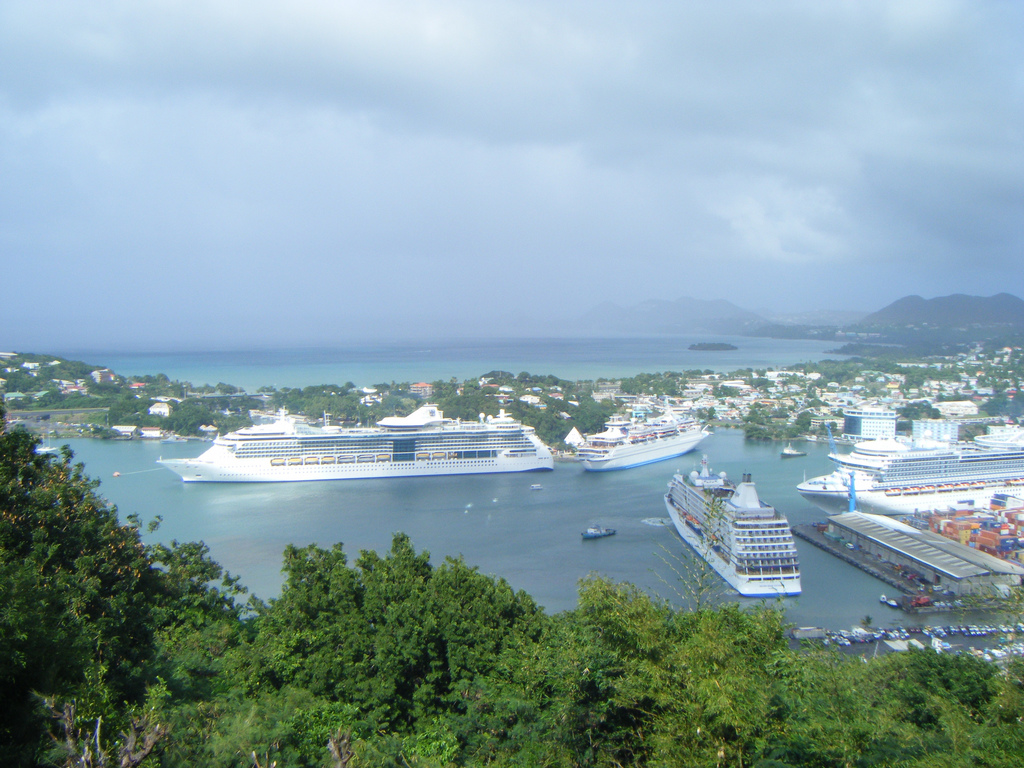
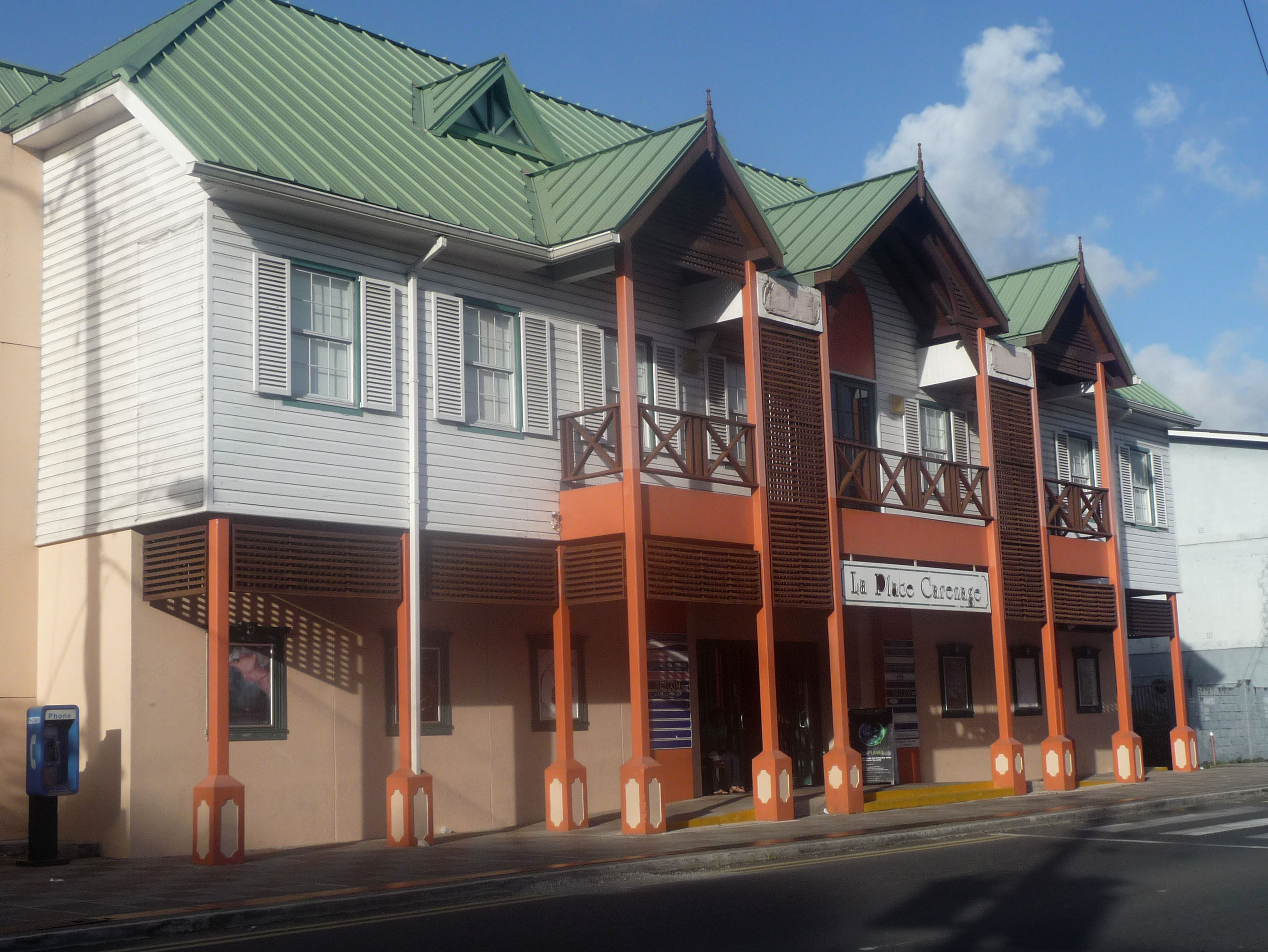
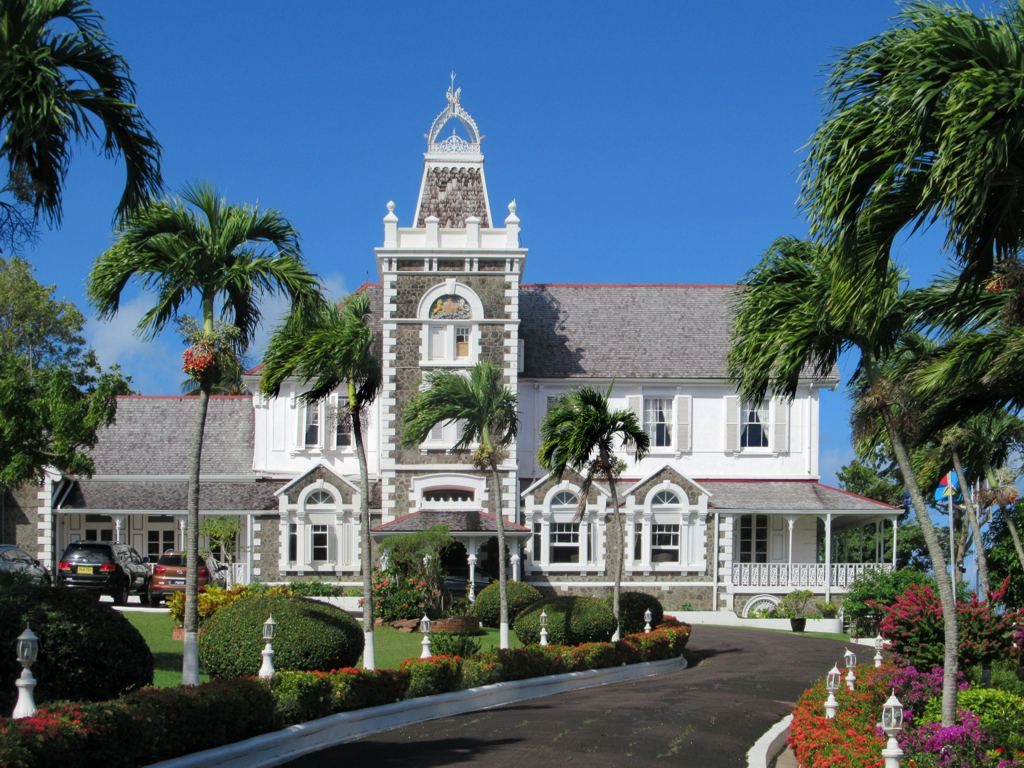
- Aerial view of Castries Cathedral Basilica of the Immaculate Conception Castries Harbour Downtown Castries Saint Lucia Government House

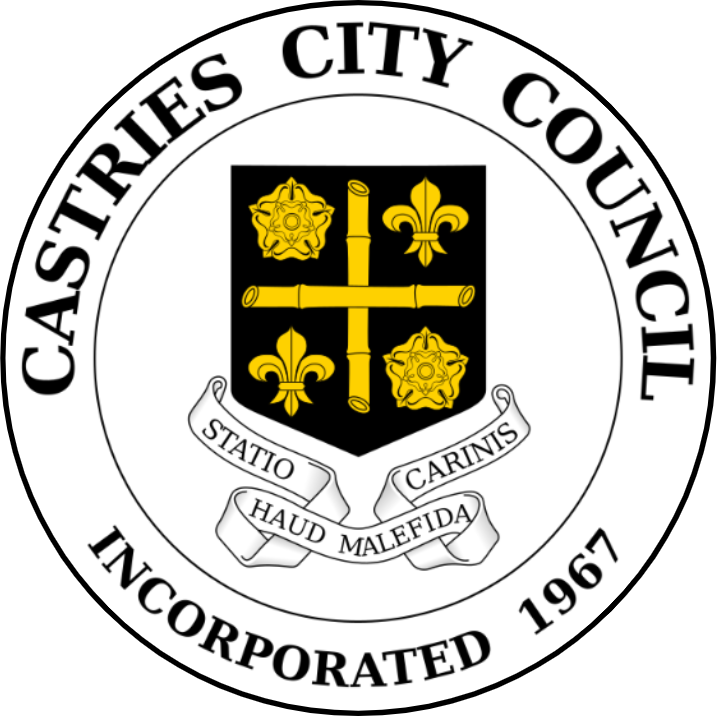
- Flag Coat of arms
- Motto: Statio Haud Malefida Carinis ("A Safe Harbour for Ships")
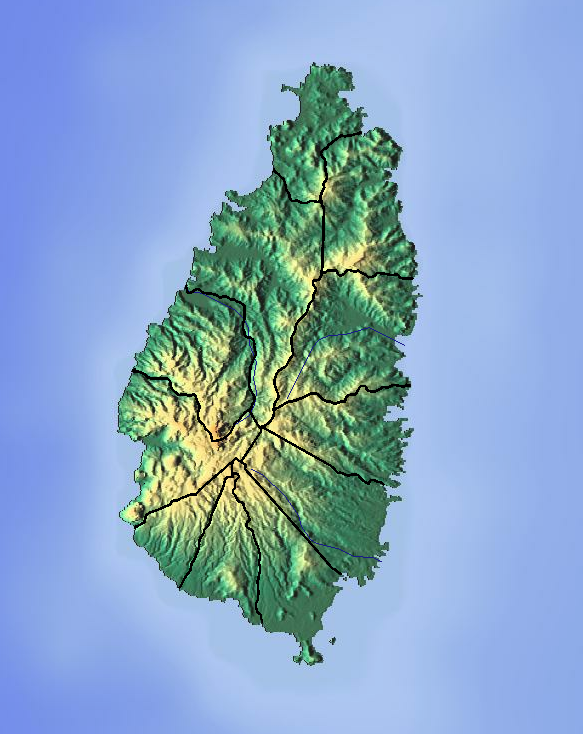
- Location within Saint Lucia Location within North America
- Coordinates: 14°00′39″N 60°59′22″W
- Country: Saint Lucia
- District: Castries District
- Founded: 1650 as "Carenage"
- Renamed: 1756 as "Castries"
- Founder: the French
- Named for: Charles Eugène Gabriel de La Croix, marquis de Castries

Government
  - Governing body: Castries City Council
  - Mayor: Geraldine Lendor-Gabriel

Area
  - Total: 79 km^{2} (31 sq mi)
- Elevation: 2 m (6.6 ft)

Population (2013)
  - Total: 20,000
  - Density: 250/km^{2} (660/sq mi)
- Time zone: UTC-04:00 (AST)
- Area code: 758
- Website: www.castriescitycouncil.org

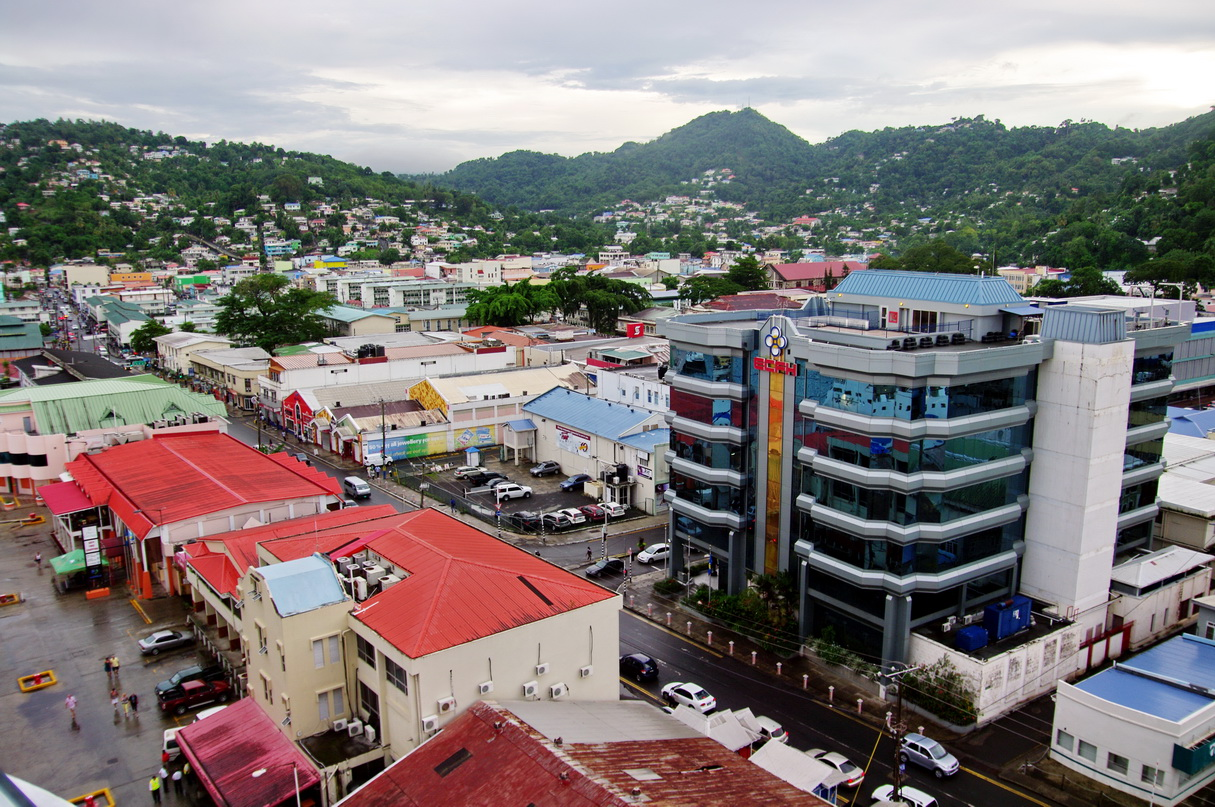
Castries, Saint Lucia

Castries (/kəˈstriːz/) is the capital and largest city of Saint Lucia, an island country in the Caribbean. The urban area has a population of approximately 20,000, while the eponymous district has a population of just under 70,000, as of May 2013. The city covers 80 km^{2} (31 sq mi).

Castries is on a flood plain and is built on reclaimed land. It houses the seat of government and the head offices of many foreign and local businesses. The city is laid out in a grid pattern. Its sheltered harbour receives cargo vessels, ferries and cruise ships. It houses duty-free shopping facilities such as Point Seraphine and La Place Carenage.

Castries is the birthplace of Arthur Lewis, winner of the 1979 Nobel Memorial Prize in Economics, as well as of Derek Walcott, winner of the 1992 Nobel Prize for Literature.

== Name ==
The original name was Carénage ("safe anchorage" in French, in reference to the city's deep water port), and was given by the French in 1650, at the time of founding. It adopted the name Castries in 1756, in honor of Charles Eugène Gabriel de La Croix, marquis de Castries, whose title relates to a commune in southern France; the origin for the commune's name is the Latin word castra, plural of castrum ("fortified field", or "strong castle, fortified city" by extension).

== History ==
In 1650, the fort auprès du Petit Cul-de-Sac et de la rivière du Carénage was founded by a group of 40 Frenchmen led by de Rousselan, when St. Lucia was purchased by Capt. du Parquet and Monsieur Houel from the French West India Company. The capital was moved to the south side of the harbor in 1769 by Gov. Baron de Micoud. In 1785, the village of Carénage was renamed Castries, after Charles Eugène Gabriel de La Croix, marquis de Castries, the French Minister of the Navy and Colonies.

In 1835, the British built the western wharf in 1642 to facilitate the coal trade and the first steamship arrived in 1841, the RMS Solway.

During World War II on 9 March 1942, the German U-161 sailed into Castries harbor at night and sank two allied ships, including the Canadian ocean liner RMS Lady Nelson, which was subsequently refloated in the harbour and taken to Canada to be converted to a hospital ship.

Castries has been rebuilt many times, following major fires on 15 October 1805, 6 April 1813, and most notably on 19 June 1948.

== Climate ==
Castries has a tropical rainforest climate (Köppen: Af).

Climate data for George F. L. Charles Airport (1991–2020)
Month	Jan	Feb	Mar	Apr	May	Jun	Jul	Aug	Sep	Oct	Nov	Dec	Year
Mean daily maximum °C (°F)	29.0 (84.2)	29.1 (84.4)	29.7 (85.5)	30.5 (86.9)	31.1 (88.0)	30.8 (87.4)	30.9 (87.6)	31.2 (88.2)	31.5 (88.7)	31.2 (88.2)	30.4 (86.7)	29.6 (85.3)	30.4 (86.7)
Daily mean °C (°F)	26.1 (79.0)	26.1 (79.0)	26.5 (79.7)	27.3 (81.1)	28.1 (82.6)	28.1 (82.6)	28.0 (82.4)	28.1 (82.6)	28.2 (82.8)	27.9 (82.2)	27.4 (81.3)	26.6 (79.9)	27.4 (81.3)
Mean daily minimum °C (°F)	23.1 (73.6)	23.0 (73.4)	23.3 (73.9)	24.2 (75.6)	25.1 (77.2)	25.3 (77.5)	25.2 (77.4)	25.0 (77.0)	24.8 (76.6)	24.5 (76.1)	24.3 (75.7)	23.7 (74.7)	24.3 (75.7)
Average precipitation mm (inches)	105.0 (4.13)	72.3 (2.85)	66.1 (2.60)	86.2 (3.39)	105.1 (4.14)	156.6 (6.17)	199.0 (7.83)	217.6 (8.57)	206.1 (8.11)	250.9 (9.88)	233.8 (9.20)	130.0 (5.12)	1,828.7 (72.00)
Average precipitation days (≥ 1 mm)	17.3	12.4	11.7	11.1	11.6	16.4	20.4	18.9	16.2	18.3	18.9	16.1	189.3
Average relative humidity (%)	73.7	71.5	71.4	73.1	74.0	76.0	78.0	79.0	78.0	79.3	79.5	75.1	75.7
Mean monthly sunshine hours	271.6	257.8	299.4	291.9	298.2	280.7	290.3	287.1	273.2	270.0	255.0	269.9	3,345.1
Source 1: National Oceanic and Atmospheric Administration
Source 2: Weather.Directory

== Tourism ==
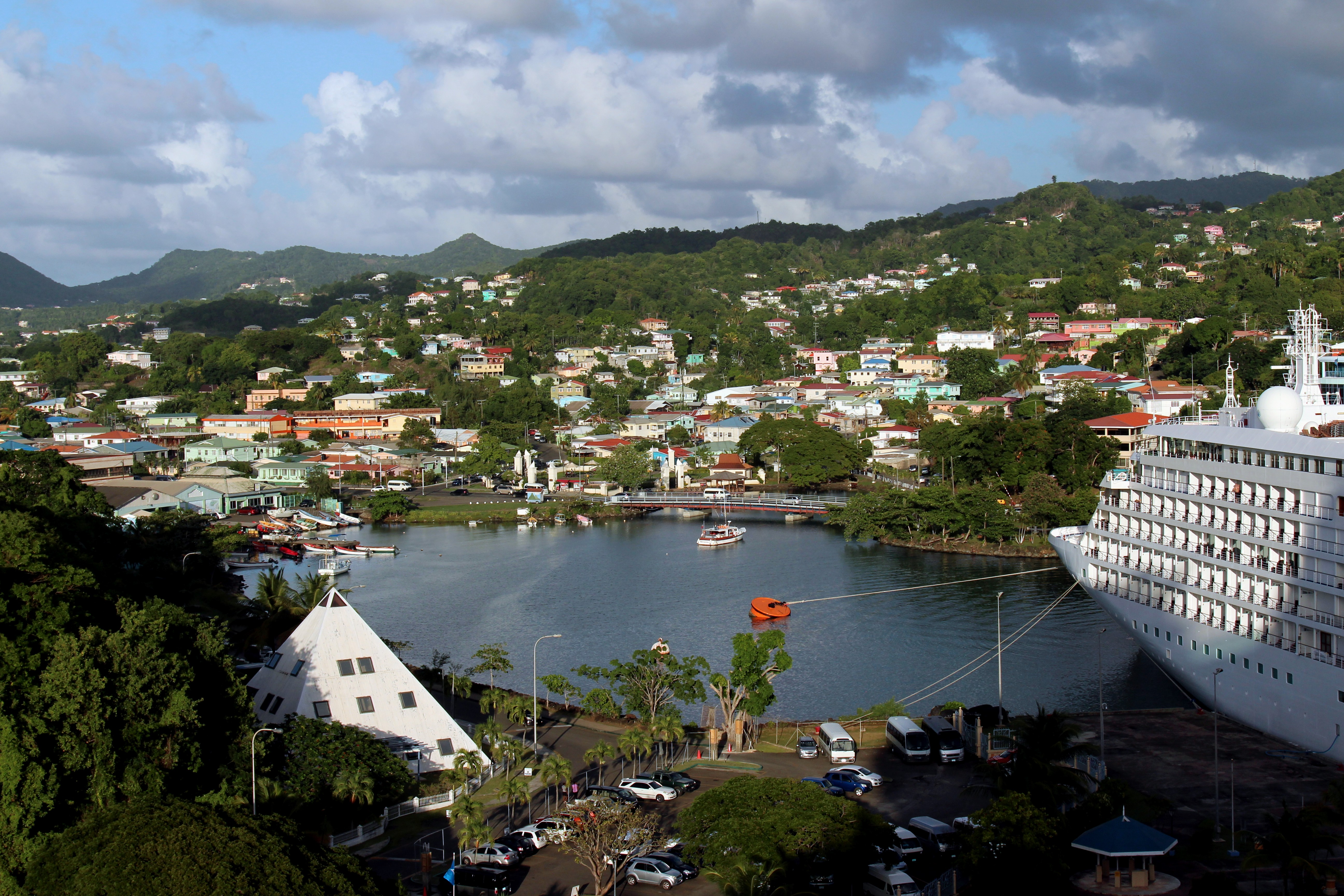
Castries Harbour, a docking port for cruise ships.

One of the major tourist areas in St. Lucia, Castries is a port of call for cruise ships. They dock at Pointe Seraphine, to the north of the harbour.

Landmarks include the Cathedral of the Immaculate Conception, Derek Walcott Square (renamed from Columbus Square to honour the island's Nobel Prize-winning poet, Derek Walcott), the City Library, the Government House, Castries Market, and Fort Charlotte, at the top of Morne Fortune (an 845-foot or 258 m hill). Beaches include Vigie Beach, Malabar Beach, Choc Beach, and La Toc Beach.

== Transport ==
Castries is served by George F. L. Charles Airport. Passengers on longer flights arrive at Hewanorra International Airport, near Vieux-Fort. The drive between Hewanorra and Castries can take an hour and a half. Helicopter service between the airports shortens travel time.

Ferries run between Castries and Fort-de-France, Martinique. Yachts may dock in Castries, though they must clear customs first. When the customs area is full, yachts must anchor at the quarantine dock to wait; those that do not are fined. Afterward, yachts may anchor in front of Castries Town or Vigie Creek.

Standard bus routes run from Castries to all outlying districts on the island. The buses are private (not subsidized by the government) bearing green license plates with numbers that start with an M—for example, M456.

== Political institutions ==
As well as being the capital city of Saint Lucia, Castries hosts the secretariat of the Organisation of Eastern Caribbean States. Castries also hosts the headquarters of the Eastern Caribbean Supreme Court.

The mayor of Castries is Geraldine Lendor-Gabriel, who took office in September 2021.

A number of international embassies and consulates keep their headquarters in Castries. They include the Organization of American States, British High Commission, Mexican Embassy, embassy of the Republic of China (Taiwan) (in Rodney Bay), Dominican Republic Consulate, French Embassy, Italian Vice Consulate, Jamaican Consulate, Netherlands Consulate, Norwegian Consulate, Brazilian Embassy and Venezuelan Embassy.

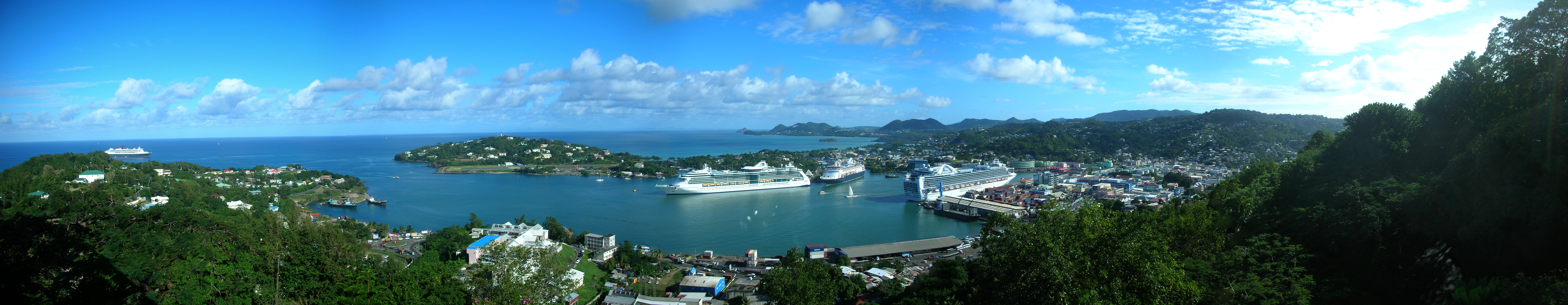
Panorama of the Port of Castries from Morne Fortune

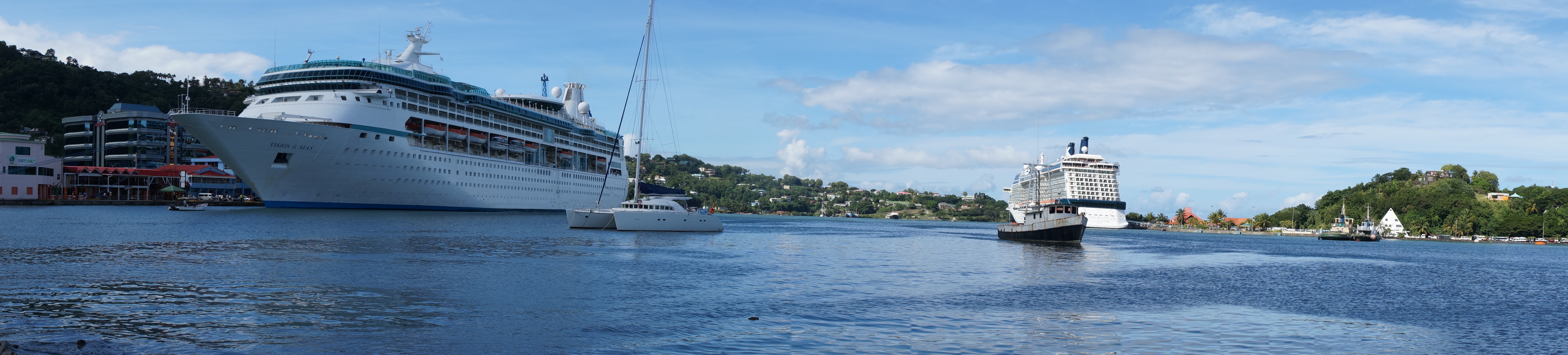
Panorama of the Port of Castries

== Notable people ==
- Martina Attille, filmmaker and contemporary artist
- Michelle Baptiste, long jumper
- Lionel Bostock, cricketer and British Army officer
- Chris Boucher, professional basketball player
- Ignatius Cadette, cricketer
- Fred Degazon, politician and first President of Dominica
- Janoi Donacien, professional footballer
- Darvin Edwards, high jumper
- Erma-Gene Evans, javelin thrower
- David Flavius, professional footballer and coach
- Emile Ford, musician and singer
- George Ford, bassist
- Kendel Hippolyte, poet and playwright
- Julian Hunte, politician and diplomat
- Botham Jean, accountant and murder victim
- Earl Jean, professional footballer
- Monét X Change, drag queen

== See also ==
- Organisation of Eastern Caribbean States
- Eastern Caribbean Supreme Court
