= Cathedral Basilica of the Immaculate Conception, Castries =

Church in Castries, Saint Lucia

Coordinates: 14°0′32.88″N 60°59′24.30″W

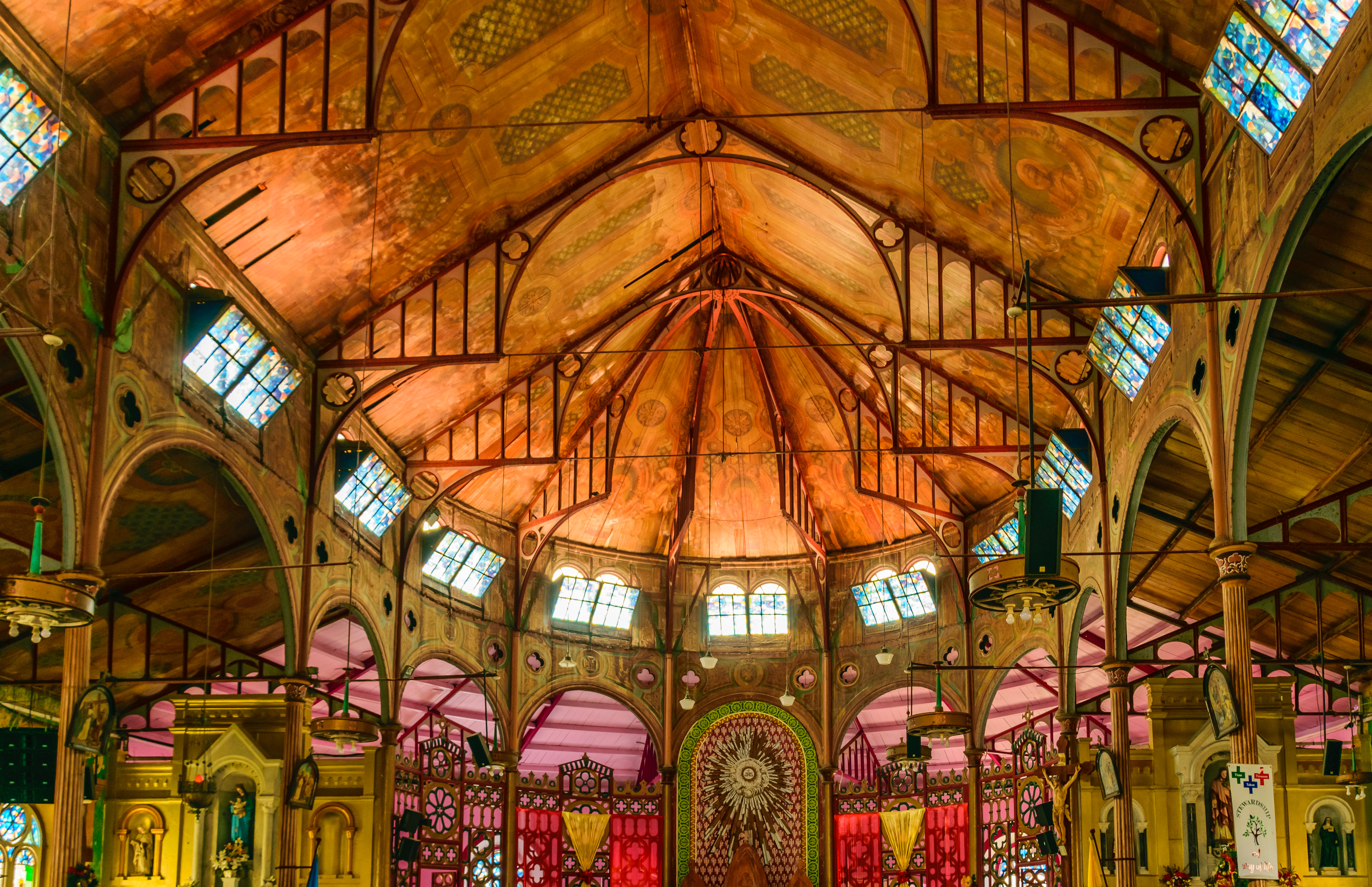
Interior photo of Cathedral Basilica of the Immaculate Conception, Castries, St. Lucia

The Minor Basilica of the Immaculate Conception, is a cathedral built in 1897 which is located in the centre of three well known streets: Peynier Street, Micoud Street and Laborie Street, and is opposite the Derek Walcott Square in Castries, Saint Lucia. It is part of the Roman Catholic Archdiocese of Castries, currently presided over by Archbishop Gabriel Malzaire. The cathedral is named after Mary, mother of Jesus, under her title, Our Lady of the Immaculate Conception.

== History ==
A church was originally built on the site in 1767. Since this date, several attempts at modernising the building have been made, with construction of a second building starting in 1807, however work stopped in 1827 due to insufficient funds. Work restarted in 1831, with a new church completed by 1835. Father Louis Tapon wrote to the Archbishop in 1885 to request funds to expand the building due to insufficient space, with the foundation stone for the building we see today being laid in 1894. Work was completed by 1897. The building was designed by Father Scoles. Both Father Scoles and Father Tapon have memorials inside the building.

The 'Cathedral' as it is commonly known, is the largest church in the Caribbean, measuring 200 ft long (61 m) by 100 ft wide (30 m) and was given the honorary status of a Minor Basilica on 11 May 1999 as part of the centenary celebrations.

The interior is decorated by a mural by St. Lucian artist Dunstan St. Omer.

The Cathedral received a Papal visit from Pope John Paul II on 7 July 1986.

=== 2000 attack ===
On New Year's Eve 2000, an attack took place during mass, leaving two people dead and many others injured. Father Charles Gaillard and Sister Theresa Egan died as a result of the attack, in which two men wielding machetes entered the church covering the worshippers in fuel, setting them alight. The two men, Kim John and Francis Phillip, were initially sentenced to death, but upon appeal received life sentences.
