= Johan Cruyff =

Dutch footballer and manager (1947–2016)

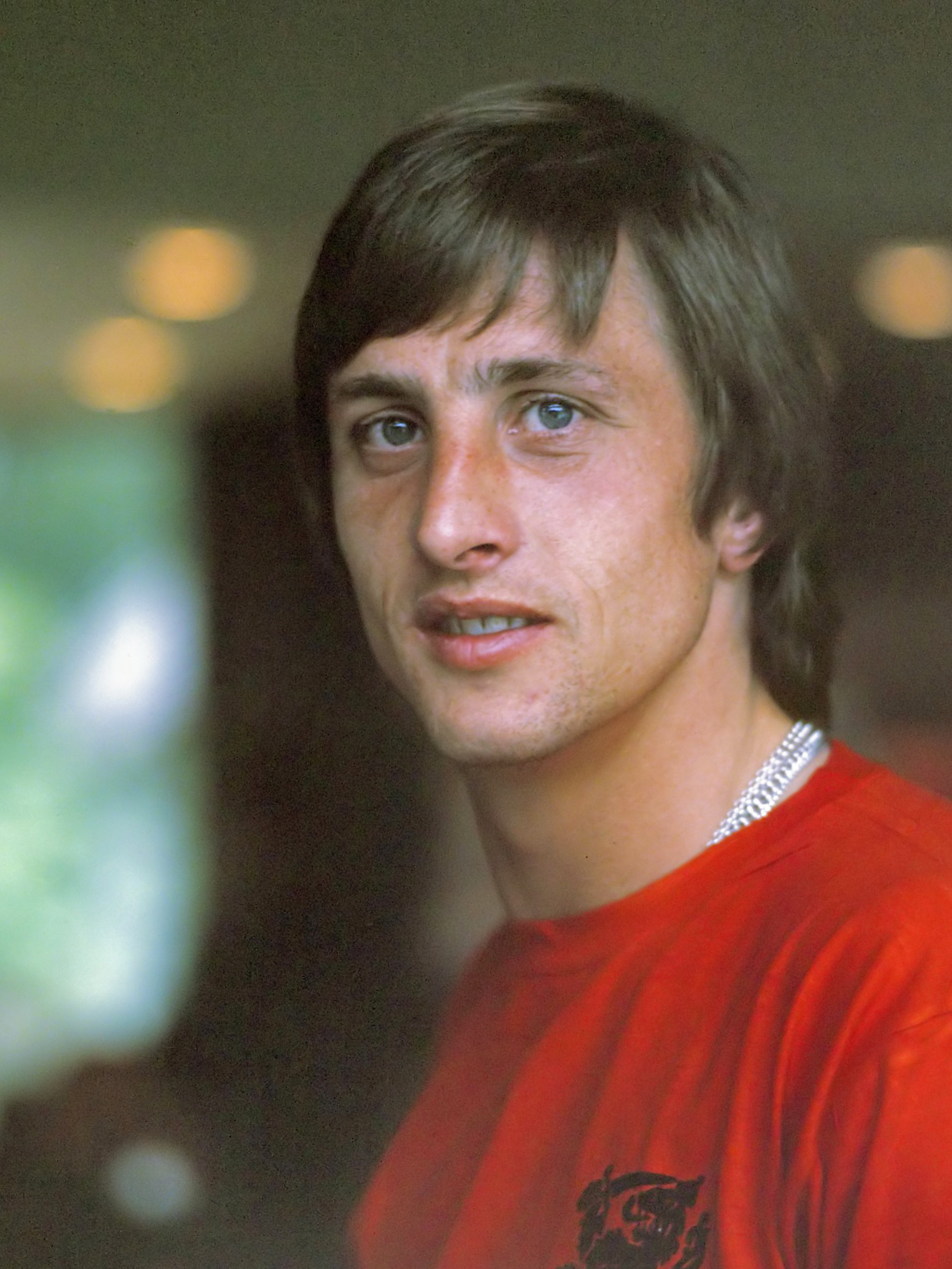
- Cruyff with the Netherlands in 1974

Personal information
- Full name: Hendrik Johannes Cruijff
- Date of birth: 25 April 1947
- Place of birth: Amsterdam, Netherlands
- Date of death: 24 March 2016 (aged 68)
- Place of death: Barcelona, Spain
- Height: 1.78 m (5 ft 10 in)
- Positions: Forward; attacking midfielder

Youth career
- 1957–1964: Ajax

Senior career*
Years	Team	Apps	(Gls)
1964–1973	Ajax	245	(193)
1973–1978	Barcelona	143	(48)
1979	Los Angeles Aztecs	22	(14)
1980–1981	Washington Diplomats	29	(12)
1981	→ Levante (loan)	10	(2)
1981–1983	Ajax	36	(14)
1983–1984	Feyenoord	33	(11)
Total		518	(294)

International career
1966–1977	Netherlands	48	(33)

Managerial career
- 1985–1988: Ajax
- 1988–1996: Barcelona
- 2009–2013: Catalonia
Medal record
Men's football
Representing Netherlands
FIFA World Cup
Runner-up	1974 West Germany
European Championship
Third place	1976 Yugoslavia
- * Club domestic league appearances and goals

Hendrik Johannes Cruijff (25 April 1947 – 24 March 2016), internationally known as Johan Cruyff (Note: Commonly known in Dutch as Johan Cruijff) (Note: Dutch: [ˈjoːɦɑŋ ˈkrœyf]) was a Dutch professional football player and manager. Regarded as one of the greatest players in history and as the greatest Dutch footballer ever, he won the Ballon d'Or three times, in 1971, 1973, and 1974. Cruyff was a proponent of the football philosophy known as Total Football, developed by Rinus Michels, both as a player and a manager. Because of the far-reaching impact of his playing style and his coaching ideas, he is widely regarded as one of the most influential figures in modern football, and he is also regarded as one of the greatest managers of all time.

In the late 1960s and early 1970s, Dutch football rose from a semi-professional and obscure level to become a powerhouse in the sport. The Netherlands qualified for the 1974 FIFA World Cup, their first appearance in the competition in 36 years. With three goals and three assists, Cruyff led the Netherlands to the final, where they lost to West Germany; nonetheless, he received the Golden Ball as player of the tournament. After finishing third in UEFA Euro 1976, Cruyff refused to play in the 1978 FIFA World Cup after a kidnapping attempt targeting him and his family in their Barcelona home led to his retirement from international football.

At club level, Cruyff started his career at Ajax in 1964, where he won six Eredivisie titles, three European Cups, and one Intercontinental Cup. He moved to FC Barcelona in 1973, winning the La Liga title in 1973–74, the club's first in 14 years, and the Copa del Rey once. After stints at the Los Angeles Aztecs and the Washington Diplomats in the United States and at Levante in Spain, Cruyff returned to Ajax in 1981, winning two further Eredivisie titles. As the club refused to extend his contract, Cruyff moved to main rivals Feyenoord in 1983, where he won the double (Eredivisie and KNVB Cup) in his first and only season at the club. After retiring from playing in 1984, Cruyff became a highly successful manager of Ajax and Barcelona, winning the 1987 European Cup Winners' Cup at Ajax, and four La Liga titles and one European Cup at Barcelona. After his dismissal in 1996, he remained an advisor to both Ajax and Barcelona. His son Jordi also played football professionally for Barcelona.

Cruyff founded the Johan Cruyff Foundation in 1997, which is intended to help disadvantaged children and those with special educational needs. In addition, he is the originator of several catchphrases and aphorisms, known as Cruijffiaans, that have entered everyday language, especially in the Netherlands and to some extent in Spain. In 1999, Cruyff was voted European Player of the Century in an election held by the International Federation of Football History & Statistics, and came second behind Pelé in their World Player of the Century poll.

== Early life ==
Hendrik Johannes "Johan" Cruyff was born on 25 April 1947 in the Burgerziekenhuis in Amsterdam. He grew up on a street five minutes away from Ajax's stadium, his first football club. Johan was the second son of Hermanus Cornelis Cruijff (1913–1959) and Petronella Bernarda Draaijer (1917–2007), from a humble, working-class background in east Amsterdam. Cruyff grew up at Akkerstraat 32 in the Betondorp ('concrete village') neighbourhood, a district whose architectural style was described as "brutalist". Akkerstraat was five minutes away from De Meer Stadion, where the football club Ajax Amsterdam played its home games. His father Manus was a fan of Ajax. The environment in which the Cruyffs grew up is described by his biographer Auke Kok as business- and market-oriented, which distanced itself from leftist ideas. The young Cruyff was shaped by Calvinism; while he was considered a devout person and often referred to God, he later also experimented with spiritualistic practices to make contact with his deceased father.

At school, Cruyff at most showed inconsistent performance and had twice to repeat a school year. Looking back on his youth, Cruyff later expressed the suspicion that his mixed academic performance and his persistent restlessness were due to ADHD. He had a close relationship with his older brother Henny, who was two and a half years his senior, during his youth. Observers originally considered Henny more talented than Johan, but he did not make the leap to the professional team. The regretful Cruyff saw the reason for this in Henny's lack of focus on football; unlike himself, Henny had never regarded football as the top priority in his life. Henny later opened a sports shop and sought to capitalise on the family connection, among other things, by arranging trips to Barcelona that, as a promotional promise, also offered tours of Cruyff's estate. His attempts to manage Cruyff were blocked by Johan's father-in-law, Cor Coster. The two brothers then fell out permanently in the 1980s, and Henny published a book in which he accused Coster of having been a member of the Waffen-SS during the German occupation of the Netherlands in the Second World War. The allegation was not supported by research.

Already in his first years as a professional footballer, Cruyff anglicised his last name; while in his native Netherlands he continues to be known as Cruijff, the anglicised version of his last name has become established in the rest of the world.

On 8 July 1959, Cruyff's father died from a heart attack. His mother Nel could not continue running the vegetable shop alone and had to give up the business. Instead, she was forced to work as a cleaner at Ajax Amsterdam, cleaning the lockers there. There she met Henk Angel (the caretaker at Ajax), with whom she entered into a second marriage. For Cruyff, the death of his father was both a tragedy and a formative event; throughout his life, he was always haunted by the fear of dying at a young age himself. Additionally, the sudden death of his father and the resulting economic consequences for the family became a driving force for him to accumulate as much money as possible in as short a time as possible in order to support and provide security for his biological and stepfamily.

Throughout his life, Cruyff remained in the judgment of his biographers a typical "Amsterdammer" with all the character traits that are, partly stereotypically, attributed to the people of Amsterdam. In this way, he displayed the typical arrogance of a big city resident attributed to Amsterdammers by the rest of the Netherlands. He was also characterised as a classic know-it-all; countless anecdotes circulate about Cruyff trying to instruct others at every opportunity. In addition, the fast-talking, talkative Cruyff had an unrestrained urge to communicate and enjoyed discussing passionately; even as World Footballer, he gave long interviews to school magazines. Furthermore, he remained loyal to the working-class dialect of his Amsterdam neighbourhood; as a new younger generation pushed into public life in the Netherlands from the 1980s onwards due to rising educational levels, there were initially numerous parodists in the Netherlands (and later also in Spain), who imitated Cruyff's idiosyncratic language.

== Club career ==
=== Gloria Ajax and the golden era of Total Football ===
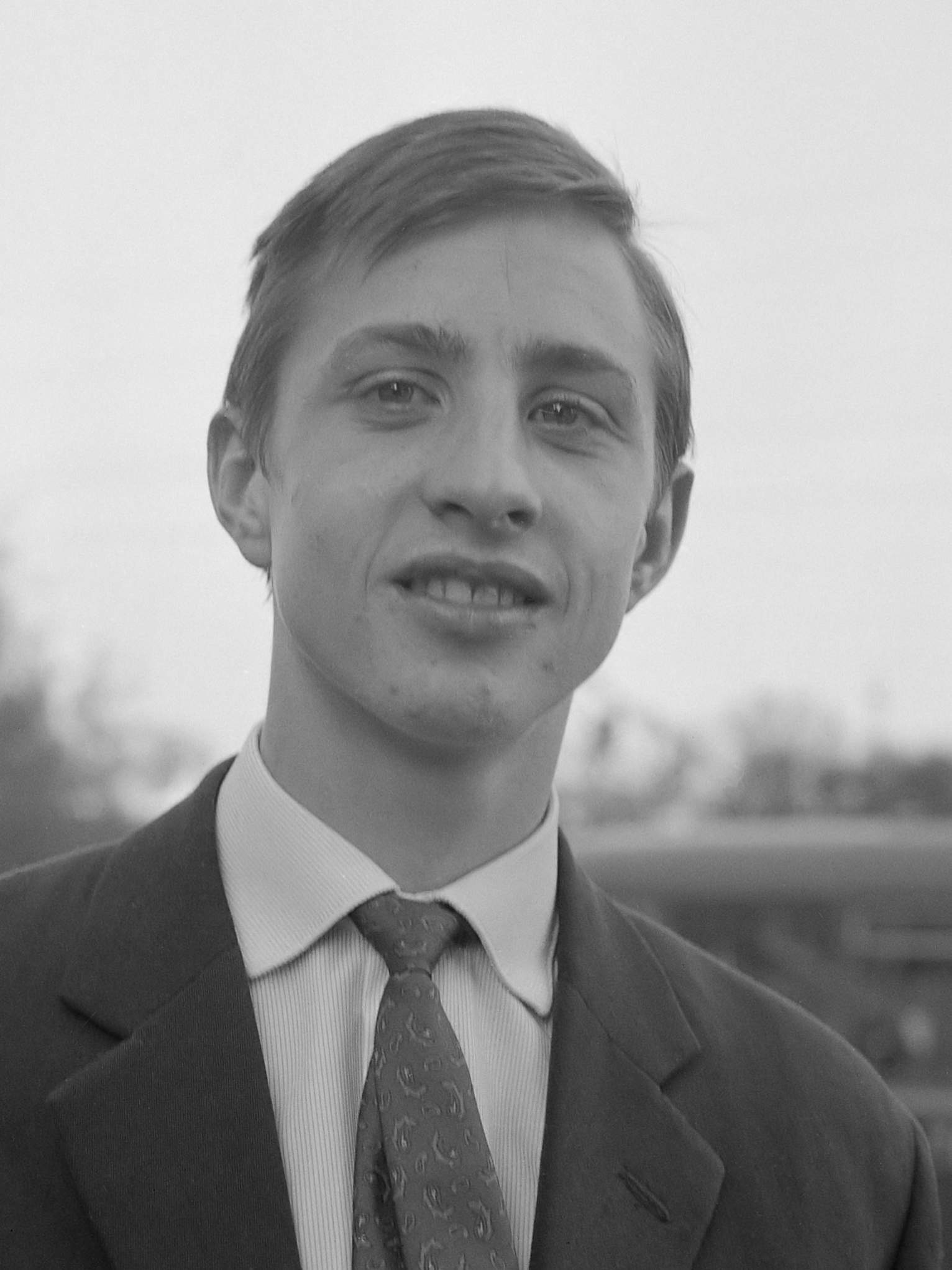
Cruyff in October 1965

Cruyff joined the Ajax youth system on his tenth birthday. Cruyff and his friends would frequently visit a "playground" in their neighborhood and Ajax youth coach Jany van der Veen, who lived close by, noticed Cruyff's talent and decided to offer him a place at Ajax without a formal trial. Cruyff suffered from physical underdevelopment when he joined the Ajax academy and head coach Vic Buckingham urged him to go to the gym while providing him with better nutrition. When he first joined Ajax, Cruyff preferred baseball and continued to play the sport until age fifteen when he quit at the urging of his coaches. At that age, Cruyff quit his secondary education without a diploma after staying down twice.

Cruyff made his first team debut on 15 November 1964 for Ajax Amsterdam in a 1–3 defeat against GVAV Groningen (since 1971 FC Groningen). In his second match, his home debut against PSV Eindhoven, he scored a goal. The following match against Feyenoord Rotterdam was lost 9–4, and after a draw the following week, Ajax were close to relegation. The management lost faith in Vic Buckingham and forced his dismissal on 21 January 1965.

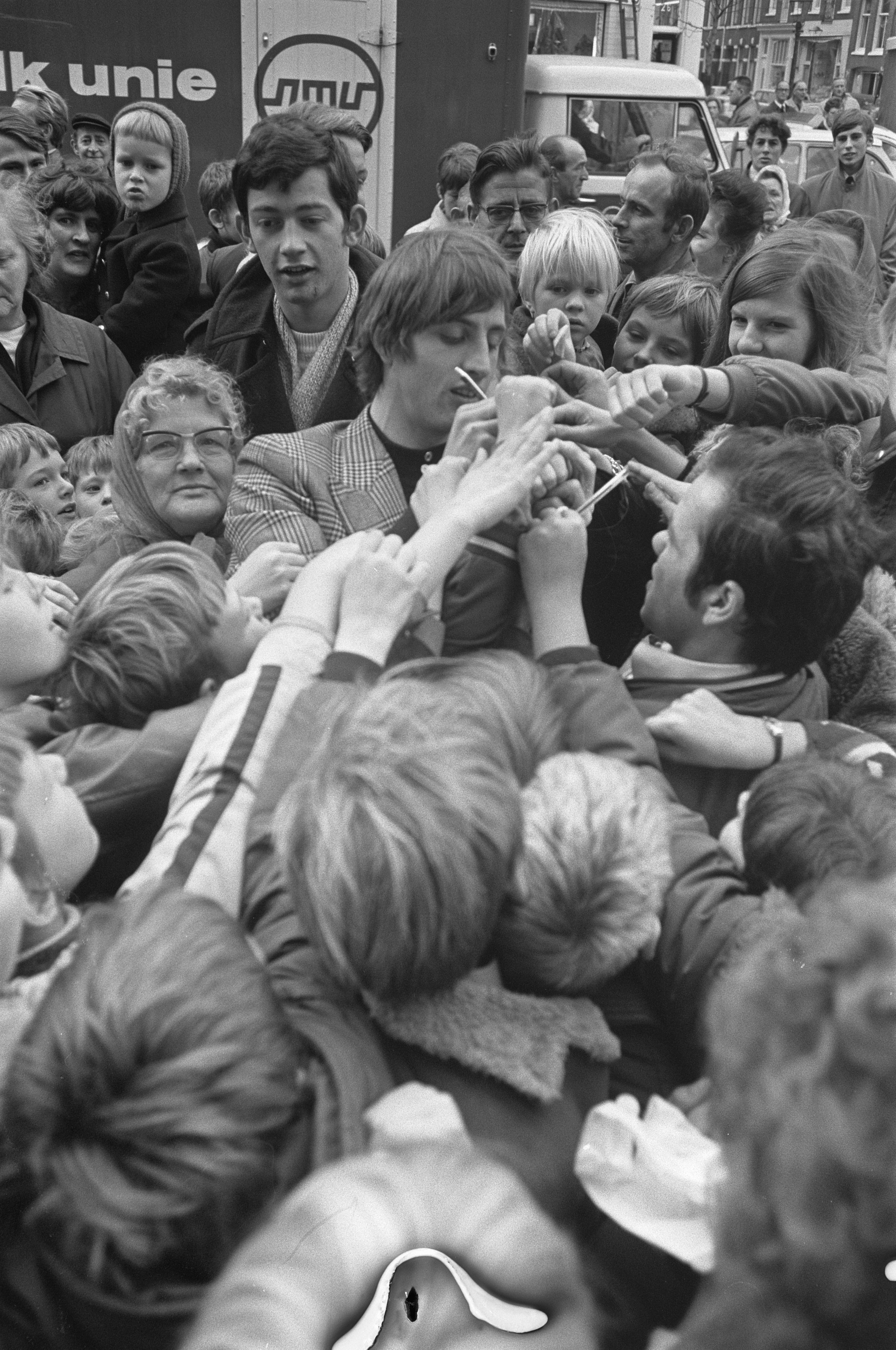
Cruyff signs autographs in Amsterdam (1969)

The 36-year-old Rinus Michels was hired as the new coach. Michels, a sports teacher for deaf children, had previously played for Ajax himself. His job description as coach included team training three evenings a week. However, the ambitious Michels soon began taking radical steps to professionalise the club. Michels placed great emphasis on iron discipline and was soon nicknamed De Generaal ('The General') by his players. He introduced training camps and had the players complete three training sessions a day, as well as a practice match in the evening. Cruyff, in particular, who had become a chain smoker in his youth, hated the rigid training and occasionally tried to hide during runs in the woods. Michels quickly took further steps toward professionalisation. Many players were part-time or amateur players who had another (main) job. Cruyff had been a sort of 'jack-of-all-trades' at a printing company.

Michels prohibited any secondary activities and turned the players into professional footballers. This was financed by a number of sponsors, including collaborators who had done business with the German occupiers during the war and wanted to clear their names, as well as Jewish businessmen, who had survived the war and saw Ajax as a surrogate family. The image of Ajax as a club with a certain Jewish flair had long been established and in the following years was repeatedly emphasised by the player generation around Cruyff (more in a symbolic and playful manner). This ahistorical stylisation began to develop a dynamic of its own especially from the 1980s onwards, when even the fans of the club Ajax stylised it as the 'Jewish club' and, in response, fans of the arch-rival Feyenoord Rotterdam began to sing antisemitic chants and make references to the Holocaust in performances. Originally seen as a symbol of football tribalism, this sparked a societal debate in the Netherlands in the early 2000s.

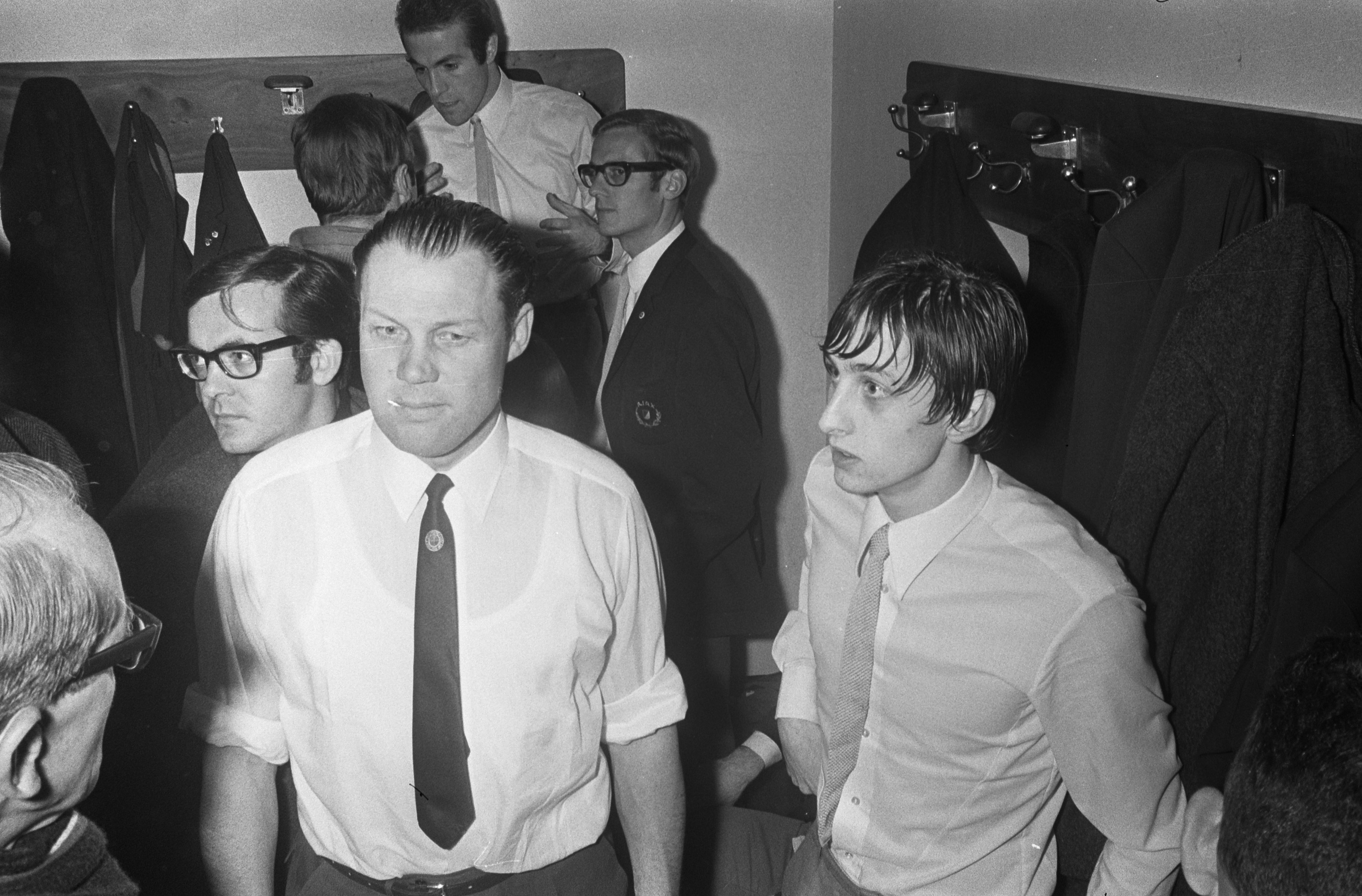
Rinus Michels and Cruyff

Tactically, Michels adapted to the opponent and flexibly switched between a 5-3-2 and a 4-2-4 formation. In the 1969–1970 season, he permanently switched to a 4–3–3. Michels placed great emphasis on aggressive tackling and physical dominance to stifle the opponent. His team also used Pressing – internally referred to as "hunting" – which was intended to put pressure on the opponent in possession of the ball. What was new was the concept of space on the pitch, which Ajax conceived in an abstract and distinctive way. British author David Winner emphasises that this was unique and concludes that this concept could only have arisen in the Netherlands with its very different understanding of the environment and nature. Cruyff and his teammates maximised the playing area when in possession by shifting the play to the wings. Conversely, when losing possession, they minimised the space by pushing their defensive line up close to the halfway line, pressing into the opponent's half, or playing the offside trap to further narrow the space. Ajax was also characterised by constant positional changes. Michels claimed the innovation of these constant positional changes for himself; as Ajax regularly dominated their opponents in the Eredivisie in the late 1960s, they increasingly encountered densely packed defensive lines. To address this problem, he wanted to integrate midfielders and defenders into the attack, which resulted in the positional changes.

The extent of Cruyff's contribution to these innovations is disputed. While Michels' contribution as coach is undisputed, the contributions of the players as a whole, and Cruyff himself, are equally emphasised. Ajax's group of players was considered the embodiment of the individualistic post-war Baby Boomer Generation, who did not readily accept authority and strove for self-realisation. Discussions among themselves about hierarchies within the team and tactics were practically a daily occurrence. The high defensive line, in its later form, was also partly initiated by the players, who wanted to conserve energy by playing on a smaller field. Cruyff, in turn, was the dominant, outstanding player who clearly stood out from this group of talented players. Cruyff, as a centre forward, already practiced what subsequently became known as the false nine, dropping back to the wings or deep into midfield to either create an overload there (if his direct opponent held his position) or to open up the space freed up in his position (if his opponent followed him) for his teammates. As the linchpin of this model, Cruyff was only nominally positioned as a centre forward, simultaneously acting as playmaker, goalscorer, and crosser. His penchant for this constant shifting of positions is also considered by the British author Simon Kuper to be the very reason for Ajax's trademark of constant positional changes (Cruyff called it "controlled chaos"), as his teammates adjusted to him and adapted intuitively. Undoubtedly, as Cruyff grew older and began discussing tactics more frequently with his teammates, his influence within the team steadily increased. As the finisher on the pitch, Cruyff assumed the role of a player-coach during these years, appearing almost everywhere on the field, constantly coaching his teammates, giving them instructions, and ordering changes in formation and position whenever he deemed it necessary. He sometimes even demanded substitutions from the bench. Looking back, Arsène Wenger emphasised that it was practically impossible to copy Ajax because the figure of the coaching player Cruyff was unique.

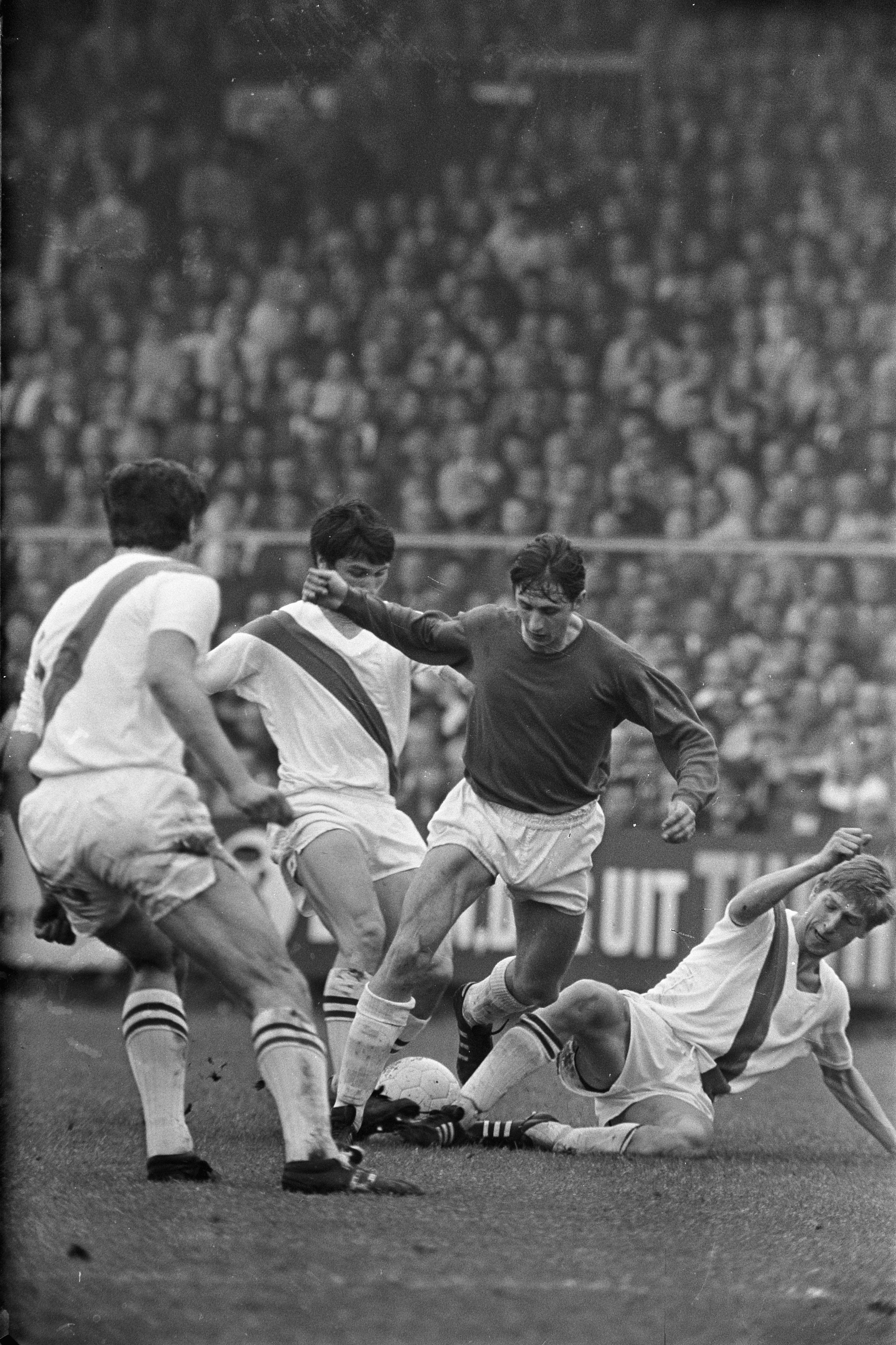
Cruyff dribbles past three defenders from Den Haag, 26 May 1968.

Cruyff's relationship with Michels had features of a father-son relationship. Simon Kuper compared it to the Lennon–McCartney partnership. As a creative partnership, they were a mutual inspiration and benefited from each other; moreover, they were clearly the driving forces of the club. On the other hand, they rubbed each other the wrong way, and the relationship also showed clear elements of competition. Michels and Cruyff both strove for dominance within the team. Cruyff repeatedly changed Michels' instructions on the field on his own initiative and often deliberately undermined the coach's directions, which led to outbursts of anger from Michels and loud arguments between the two. Michels also suspected the somewhat hypochondriacal Cruyff of feigning injuries. Cruyff adopted from Michels the conflict model that Michels had implemented to create creative friction, and which became part of his own credo – but, as Kuper argues, this was actually just a pretext for Cruyff's combative personality. With "Total Football" (as the Ajax style was dubbed in 1965), Ajax initially became the dominant force in Dutch football, winning the league title in 1966, 1967, 1968, and 1970.

In the early 1970s, Ajax shifted the balance of power in international football. During the 1960s, the football world had been dominated by the Italian Catenaccio, a style based purely on defense. Its leading exponents, AC Milan and Inter Milan, had each won the European Cup (predecessor to the Champions League) and the Intercontinental Cup twice. Ajax's victory over Inter Milan in the 1972 European Cup final, a classic clash of systems, was portrayed in many newspapers as the end of Catenaccio. Football writer and novelist Brian Glanville saw Catenaccio completely overshadowed by Total Football. The Ajax example first caught on in the Eredivisie in the 1970s, where other clubs like Feyenoord also adopted elements of Total Football and incorporated more frequent positional changes into their game. Subsequently, other clubs, for example in England, also tried to adopt elements of the Ajax style, but with far less success.

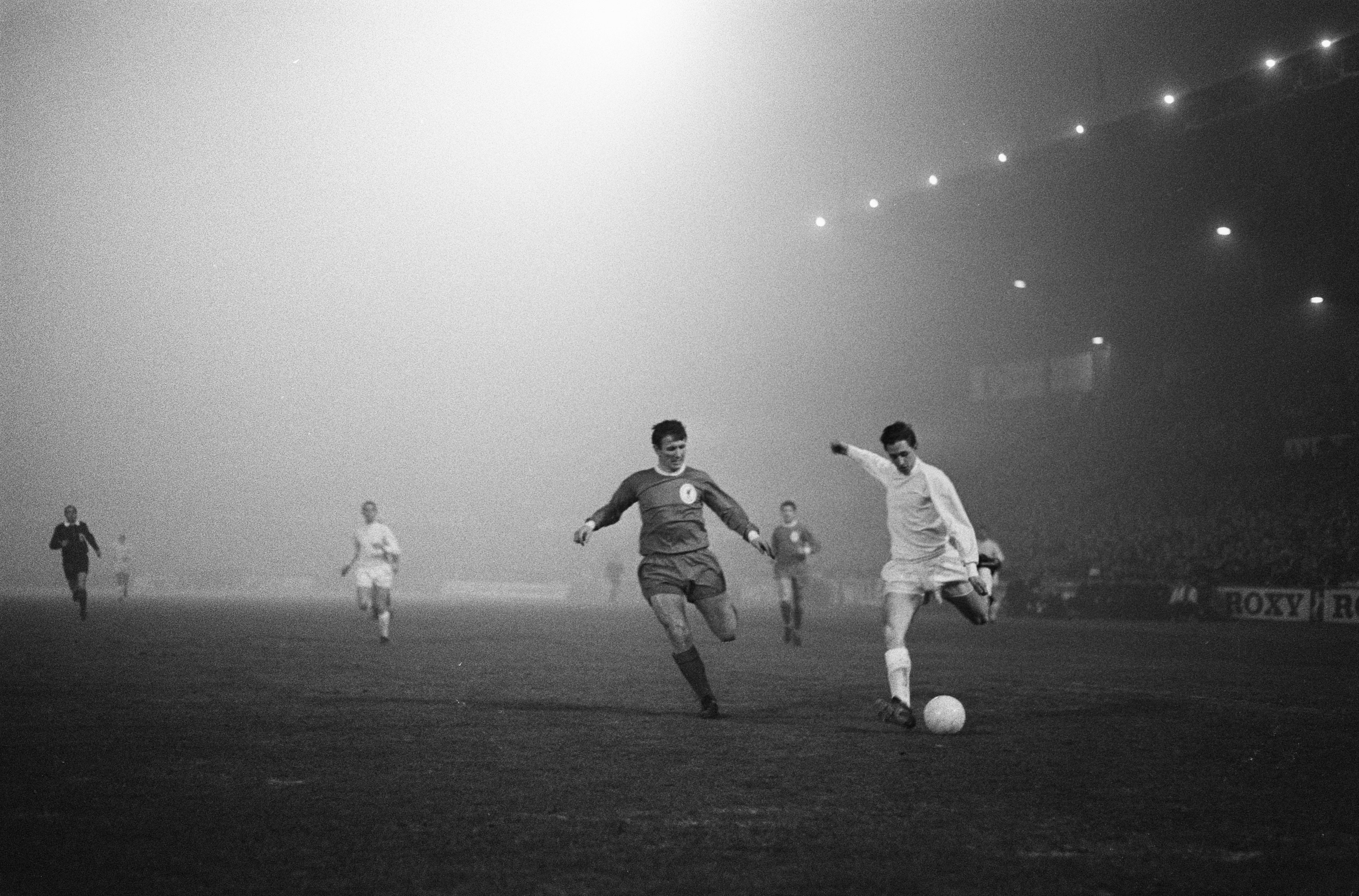
Cruyff playing for Ajax taking on Liverpool defender Tommy Smith in a European Cup game in December 1966

In his early years, Cruyff's performances were inconsistent; at times his enormous talent shone through, while at other times he disappeared in big games and failed to make any significant impact on the game. Furthermore, he was frequently injured or complained of minor ailments. Michels suspected Cruyff more than once of feigning injuries. Due to his early tendendency to avoid passing the ball, instead repeatedly getting lost in dribbling and solo runs, he was unpopular with his teammates on the pitch. His position varied in his early years; when he was not yet a regular starter, he was used not only as a centre-forward but also as a substitute on the wing or in midfield.

Cruyff really started to make an impression in the 1965–66 season and established himself as a regular first team player after scoring two goals against DWS in the Olympic stadium on 24 October 1965 in a 2–0 victory. In the seven games that winter, he scored eight times and in March 1966 scored the first three goals in a league game against Telstar in a 6–2 win. Four days later, in a cup game against Veendam in a 7–0 win, he scored four goals. In total that season, Cruyff scored 25 goals in 23 games, and Ajax won the league championship.

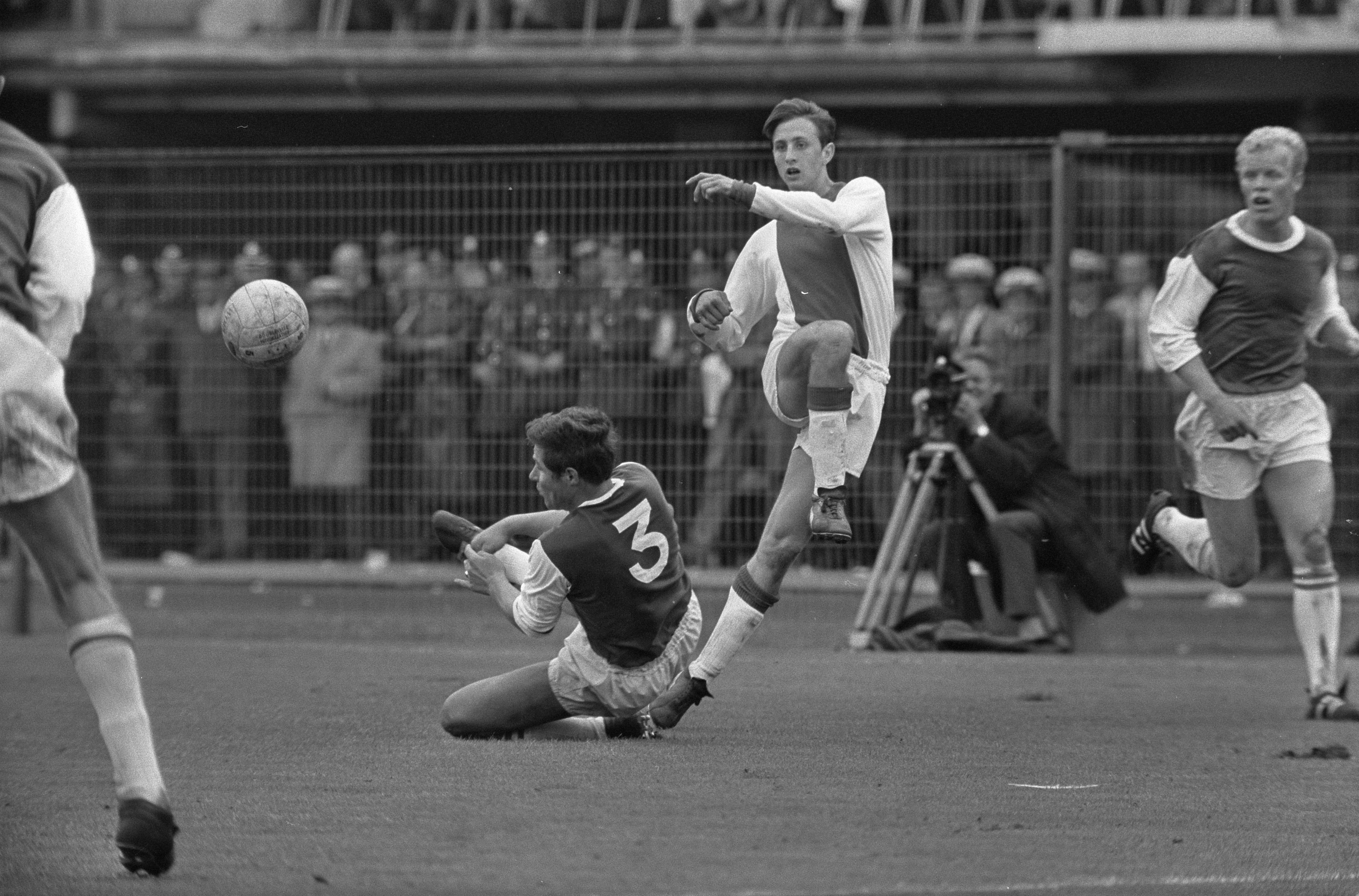
Cruyff was instrumental in Ajax's dominance of European football in the early 1970s. He played for Ajax from 1957 to 1973 and 1981 to 1983 (seen here in 1967 against Feyenoord).

The 1966–67 season was another big step for Cruyff; he was already a regular starter at the beginning of the season; he displaced the experienced Henk Groot from the forward line, who moved into midfield and formed the dominant trio in the team with Cruyff and Piet Keizer. Ajax won the championship title and regularly outclassed their opponents with a flurry of goals – at the end of the season they had a record of 122 goals. Cruyff ended the season as the leading goalscorer in the Eredivisie with 33. Ajax also won the KNVB Cup, for Cruyff's first "double". Internationally, Ajax faced Liverpool in a pivotal match – Winner calls it the breakthrough that marked Ajax's first success on the international stage – on 7 December 1966, in Amsterdam. Ajax dominated and won 5–1. In the return leg in Liverpool, Cruyff scored two goals to secure a 2–2 draw. The next round against Dukla Prague brought disappointment, and Ajax were eliminated.

Ajax won the league for the third successive year in the 1967–68 season. Cruyff was also named Dutch footballer of the year for the second successive time, a feat he repeated in 1969. In the European Cup, Ajax were eliminated by Real Madrid after extra time; in Madrid, Ajax missed numerous clear-cut chances, Cruyff himself stood in front of the goalkeeper shortly before the end of the game and, after a brief hesitation, missed. The following season, the team's focus shifted even more towards the European Cup; for the first time in years, Ajax finished second in the Eredivisie. In the second round, Ajax beat Istanbul in a famous match played on a mud pitch, with Cruyff scoring the winning goal; the game became known in the Netherlands as the "Hell of Fenerbahce". In the quarter-finals against Benfica Lisbon, Ajax overcame a 1–3 deficit from the first leg, necessitating a replay; Ajax won this 3–0 in neutral Paris. In the semi-finals, they defeated Sparta Trnava. The final brought disappointment; Milan's packed defense and Giovanni Trapattoni's consistent man-marking of Cruyff resulted in a one-sided 4–1 victory. Cruyff subsequently faced heavy criticism from coach Michels and the press.

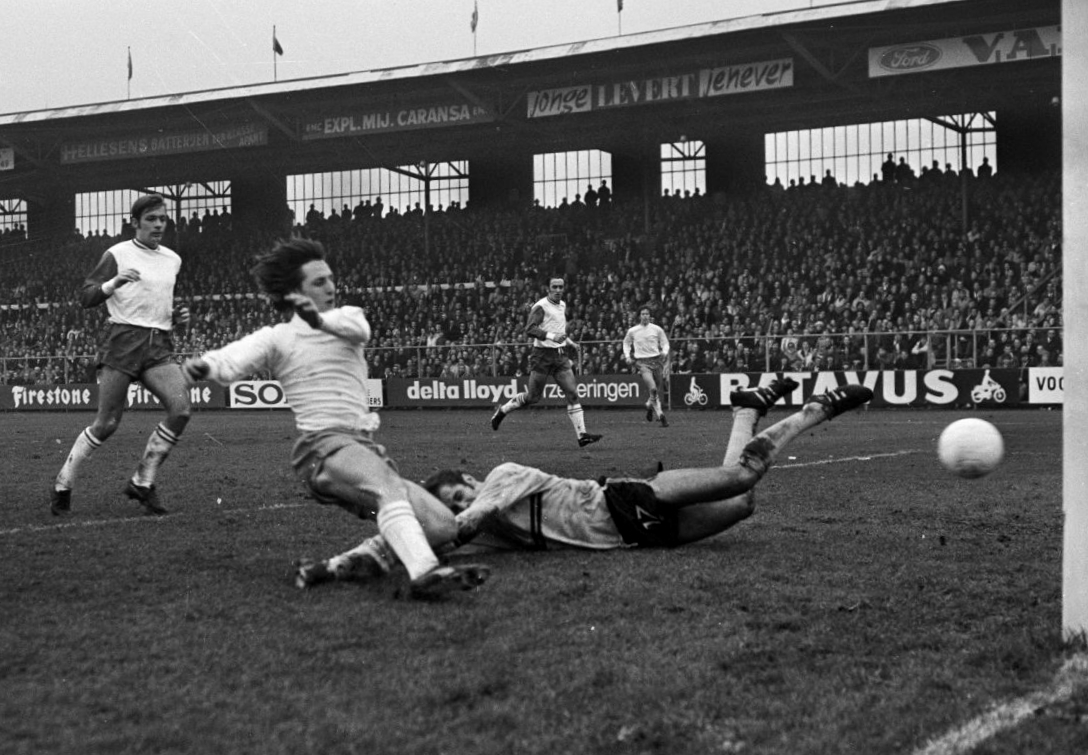
Cruyff scores the third goal in a 7–1 win against FC Utrecht (13 December 1970)

The following season, a rejuvenated Ajax team won the championship convincingly. at the beginning of the 1970–71 season, he suffered a groin injury. He made his comeback on 30 October 1970 against PSV, and rather than wear his usual number 9, which was in use by Gerrie Mühren, he instead used number 14. From then on, he only wore number 14 for Ajax. Although it was very uncommon in those days for the starters of a game not to play with numbers 1 to 11, from that moment onwards, Cruyff wore number 14, even with the Dutch national team. There was a documentary on Cruyff, Nummer 14 Johan Cruyff and in the Netherlands there is a magazine by Voetbal International, Nummer 14. He soon benefited from the 4-3-3 formation, which was becoming increasingly standard. In November, Cruyff scored six goals against AZ Alkmaar, equaling a record. After winning a replayed KNVB Cup final against Sparta Rotterdam by a score of 2–1, Ajax won in Europe for the first time. Ajax won the final against Panathinaikos Athens. He signed a seven-year contract at Ajax. At the end of the season, he was named the Dutch and European Footballer of the Year for 1971.

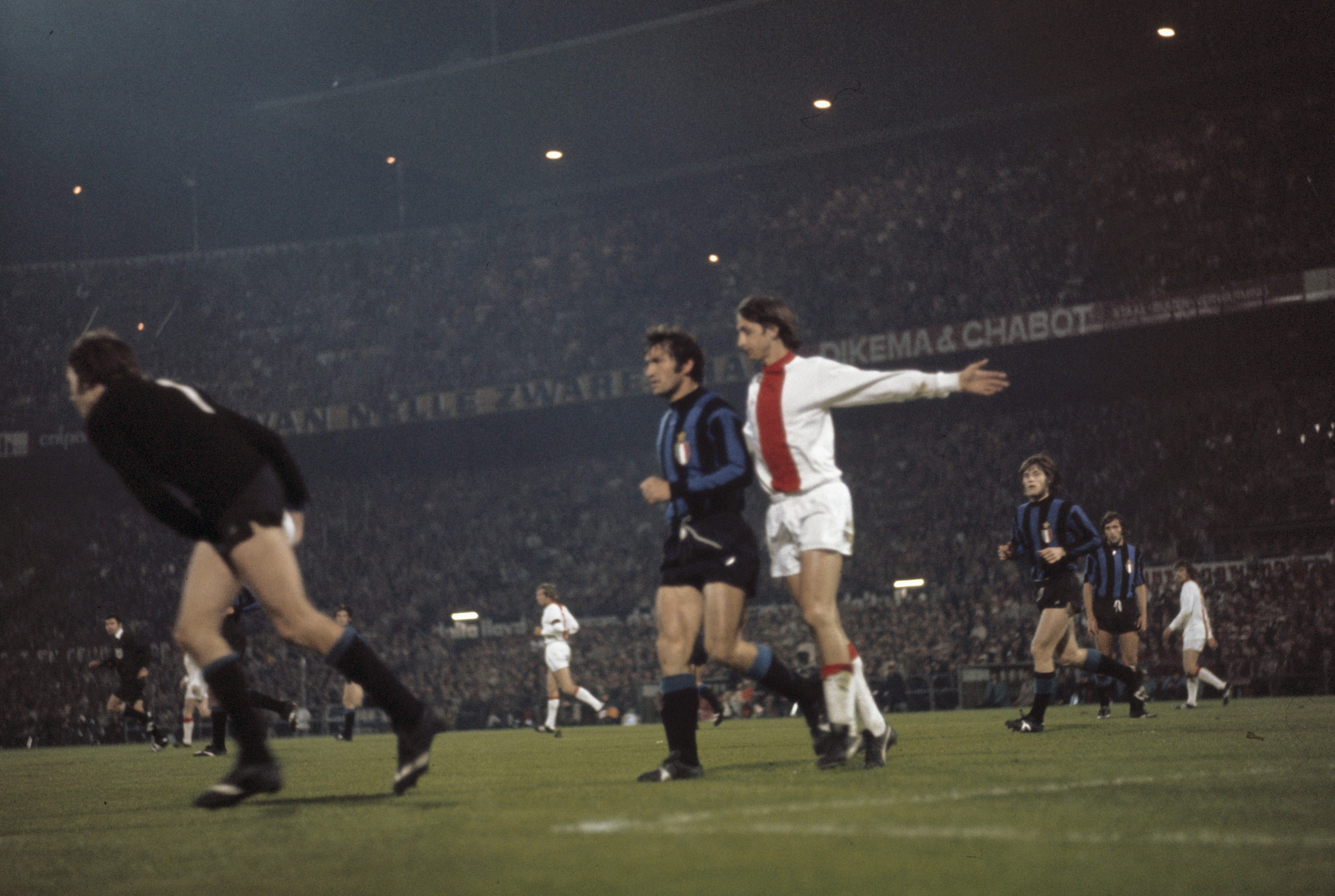
Cruyff in the final against Inter Milan (31 May 1972)

Rinus Michels left Amsterdam after this triumph and moved to Spain, where he took over as manager of FC Barcelona. His successor was the relatively unknown Ștefan Kovács. Kovács had previously managed Steaua Bucharest in Romania. Unlike Michels, Kovács was not an authoritarian manager; he had a relaxed approach, gave the players much more freedom on and off the pitch, and did not place any value on the strict discipline demanded by Michels. He let his assistant, Bobby Harms, organise training and let the players decide on friendly matches. He made only gradual changes. For example, he substituted players less frequently and refrained from varying the team's system and tactics depending on the opponent in European competitions. By this time, the mature and well-developed team benefited from this and flourished once again. Under the new coach, Cruyff assumed an even larger, more dominant role than in Michels' final years and was more than ever a "player-manager" on the pitch. Without the authoritarian Michels, it was Cruyff who demanded discipline verbally and with expressive gestures, argued with the referee, and initiated discussions within the team. Under Kovács, the team won the treble of league title, KNVB Cup, and, as the crowning achievement, the European Cup for the second time in a row: In the European Cup final, Inter Milan were defeated 2–0 in a one-sided encounter, with Cruyff scoring both goals. This victory prompted Dutch newspapers to announce the demise of the Italian catenaccio style of defensive football in the face of Total Football. Soccer: The Ultimate Encyclopaedia says, "Single-handed, Cruyff not only pulled Internazionale of Italy apart in the 1972 European Cup Final, but scored both goals in Ajax's 2–0 win." After declining participation the previous year, Ajax also won the 1972 Intercontinental Cup against Argentina's Independiente in September 1972, followed by the 1972 European Super Cup in the winter which was won by beating Rangers.

In the following season, Kovács' final year, internal tensions within the team increased, and Cruyff, with his status as an outstanding player, provoked jealousies. According to Simon Kuper, the star Cruyff simply had become too big for the Netherlands. Under Kovács' again relaxed regime, a lack of fitness became apparent. Instead of offering further spectacular performances, Ajax played with increasing routine and energy conservation; the result was several 1-0 victories. In the end, they won another Eredivisie title. Internationally, Ajax once again played with aplomb. On 7 March, the Bayern Munich team built around Franz Beckenbauer and Gerd Müller was thrashed 4–0 in a one-sided match. The injured Cruyff did not travel to the return leg in Munich (a 2–1 win for Bayern), which caused irritation among his teammates. In the semi-final against Real Madrid, the "Amsterdammers" achieved two comfortable victories to reach the final once again. A seasoned Ajax team successfully defended their title in 1973 with a comfortable 1–0 win against Juventus. After taking the lead in the 4th minute through Johnny Rep, Ajax avoided any risks and "froze" the game with long passing sequences that prevented the opponent from even getting a touch of the ball. Cruyff was awarded the Ballon d'Or as "European Footballer of the Year" in 1973, as he had been in 1971.

=== Barcelona and the first La Liga title in 14 years ===
When players like [Gareth] Bale and [Cristiano] Ronaldo are worth around €100 million, Johan [Cruyff] would go in the billions!

— Franz Beckenbauer, in an interview with Bild.de (September 2014) about Cruyff's transfer value in the early 1970s

Kovács left Ajax in the summer of 1973 and was replaced by coach George Knobel from MVV Maastricht. A major incident occurred at the training camp in De Lutte. Piet Keizer, captain in the 1971–72 season, made it clear that he wanted the captain's armband back, which he had given to Cruyff a year earlier. Keizer argued that Cruyff was too selfish in his business dealings and neglected the well-being of the team.

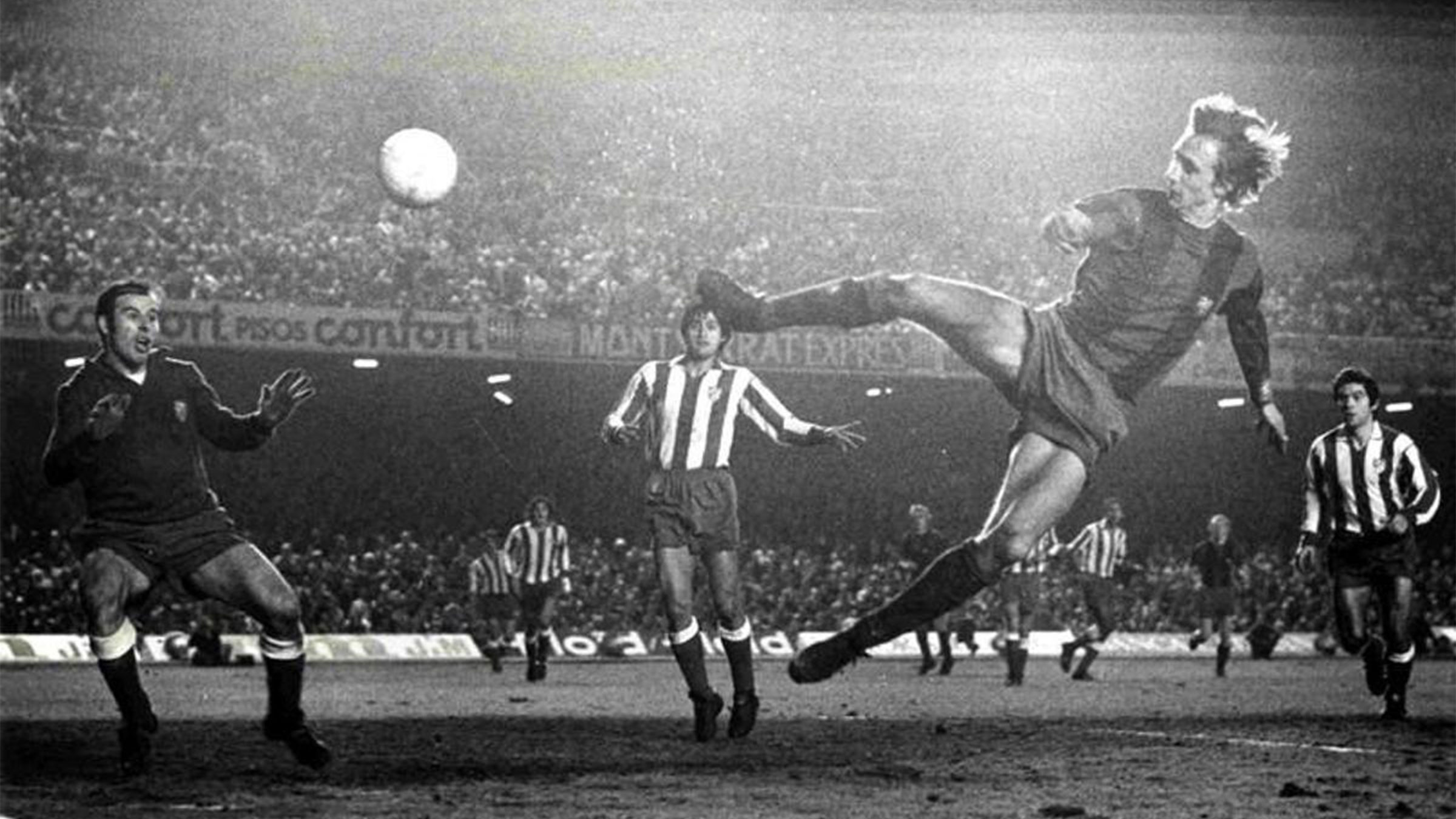
Cruyff played for FC Barcelona from 1973 to 1978.

Cruyff refused and insisted on a vote. New-signing Pim van Dord did not vote, whereupon the remaining 15 players cast their ballots. The vote was 8 to 7 in favour of Keizer. The sulky Cruyff felt humiliated and immediately called his father-in-law, Cor Coster, to whom he expressed his desire to leave, saying: "You must call Barcelona immediately, I want to get out of here." In mid-1973, Cruyff was sold to FC Barcelona for 6 million guilders (approx. US$2 million) in a world record transfer fee. FC Barcelona had been interested in Cruyff for years; however, offers had been impossible, as foreigners were not eligible to play in the Spanish league from 1962 to 1973. Furthermore, since Barcelona coach Rinus Michels viewed Cruyff as a difficult, disruptive character, the management had initially tried to sign Gerd Müller from Bayern Munich. After a breakdown of negotiations with Müller, Michels agreed to facilitate a transfer for Cruyff. Barcelona's manager Armand Carabén, who was married to a Dutch woman, initiated the negotiations for the transfer. Cruyff, who was still under contract with Ajax, pushed for the transfer by implicitly threatening that he would simply stop playing for Ajax or the national team if the transfer did not go through. As a result, the federation and Ajax initially relented. A last-minute offer from Real Madrid also failed; Cruyff blackmailed the national federation and Ajax with a threat to resign if Ajax sold him to Madrid against his will. The transfer fee of 6 million guilders made him the most expensive player in the world.

Cruyff, who was generally apolitical, was unaware of the political situation in Spain at that time. He appreciated Barcelona's climate and the financial opportunities, which far exceeded what he could earn in the Netherlands. He defended his move to Francoist Spain, which was criticised in some quarters, with a shrug. He was also unaware about the political background of the rivalry between the formerly autonomous Catalonia on the one hand and Castile, or rather Real Madrid as a symbol of the central government, on the other, and knew nothing about the years of political and cultural discrimination against the regions (especially Catalonia) by the Franco regime. When his son was born and the Cruyffs chose the name Jordi for him, they were unaware that Jordi was the patron saint of Catalonia and that the name had therefore been banned by the Franco government. As part of a general, gradual political liberalisation of the regime in the 1970s, the Cruyffs were allowed to name their son Jordi. This naming was misinterpreted as a political statement and increased Cruyff's popularity. It was only in his second year that he began to express some political views, often railing against the (supposed) discrimination against Barça by the central organisation, or Madrid. However, according to his biographers, the entirely apolitical Cruyff always focused on the sporting aspect; he was always referring to the federation and/or the referees, never to Franco's fascist regime itself.

In the 1973–74 season, Cruyff cemented his reputation as the best player in the world. Until his registration was completed, Cruyff was ineligible to play in the league, and he and the team instead played some training matches against various, often lower-league, sides, allowing him to gain experience. Cruyff made his competitive debut in front of 90,000 spectators at the Camp Nou on 28 October 1973, against Granada. Cruyff immediately took control as playmaker and scored two goals of his own in a comfortable 4–0 victory. At that time, Barça were only in 14th place in the table, near the relegation zone. This was followed by a run of four wins, and FC Barcelona took over the top spot in the league. In the next match, their toughest rivals, Atlético Madrid, were beaten 2–1, with Cruyff scoring the opening goal in an acrobatic fashion. The goal was featured in the documentary En un momento dado, in which fans of Cruyff attempted to recreate that moment. The goal has been dubbed Le but impossible de Cruyff ('Cruyff's impossible goal').

In mid-February 1974, a demonstration of power followed in the away game against their fiercest rivals Real Madrid at their home of the Santiago Bernabéu. In a one-sided match, Cruyff excelled as a goalscorer, provider, and playmaker. Cruyff, who outshone Real's playmaker Günter Netzer, dribbled past three opponents himself and scored the goal to make it 2–0. After that, he sometimes dropped back and was everywhere on the pitch, where he also contributed defensively. The final score was 5–0. Thousands of Barcelona fans who watched the match on television poured out of their homes to join in street celebrations. A New York Times journalist wrote that Cruyff had done more for the spirit of the Catalan people in 90 minutes than many politicians in years of struggle. Football historian Jimmy Burns stated, "with Cruyff, the team felt they couldn't lose".

The Spanish championship was secured at the beginning of April with a 4–2 victory over Sporting Gijon. In Cruyff's debut season, the number of club members (die socis) increased from 58,000 the previous year to 64,130. Until this time, the Madrid derby between Real and Atlético had been the most important match in Spanish football. Since then, the matches between Real Madrid and FC Barcelona have become the most important fixture in the match calendar; as El Clásico, they remain a cross-sport event into the 21st century.

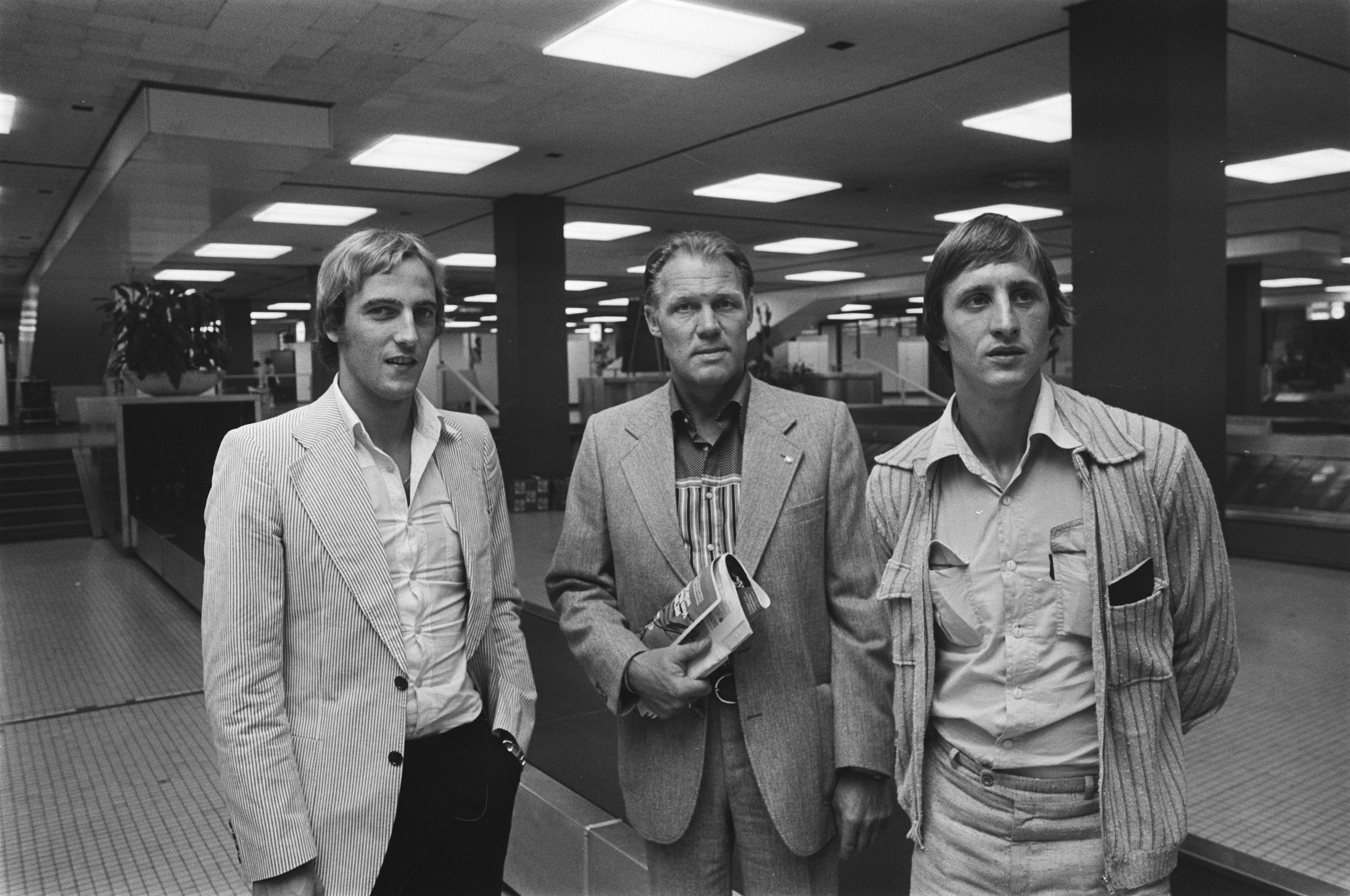
Neeskens, Michels and Cruyff (1976)

Cruyff's second season in Spain began quite promisingly once again. Johan Neeskens was signed as a new addition. However, Neeskens, known at Barcelona simply as "Johan Segundo", did not provide the hoped-for reinforcement. Since only two foreign players were eligible to play at any one time, the creative and speedy left winger Hugo Sotil had to make way, which negatively impacted the attacking play. Furthermore, Neeskens struggled to integrate into the team during his first year.

The season proved disappointing. At home, Barcelona continued to dominate and play spectacular football. In away games, Cruyff was aggressively marked by opposing defenders in an attempt to neutralize him. In his second year, Cruyff missed the preferential treatment he had enjoyed as a star player with referees. He responded by evading man-marking and drifting further into midfield. He also frequently clashed with referees and spectators and received several yellow cards. In February 1975, he was sent off in Malaga after vigorously protesting after a clear offside goal by Malaga. Nevertheless, he refused to leave the pitch and was eventually escorted off by the police. Although apolitical, Cruyff quickly seized upon the widespread complaints that the Spanish federation favoured Real Madrid. In 1978, Barcelona defeated Las Palmas 3–1, to win the Copa del Rey. Cruyff played two games with Paris Saint-Germain in 1975 during the Paris tournament. He had only agreed because he was a fan of designer Daniel Hechter, who was then president of PSG.

=== Brief retirement and spells in the United States ===
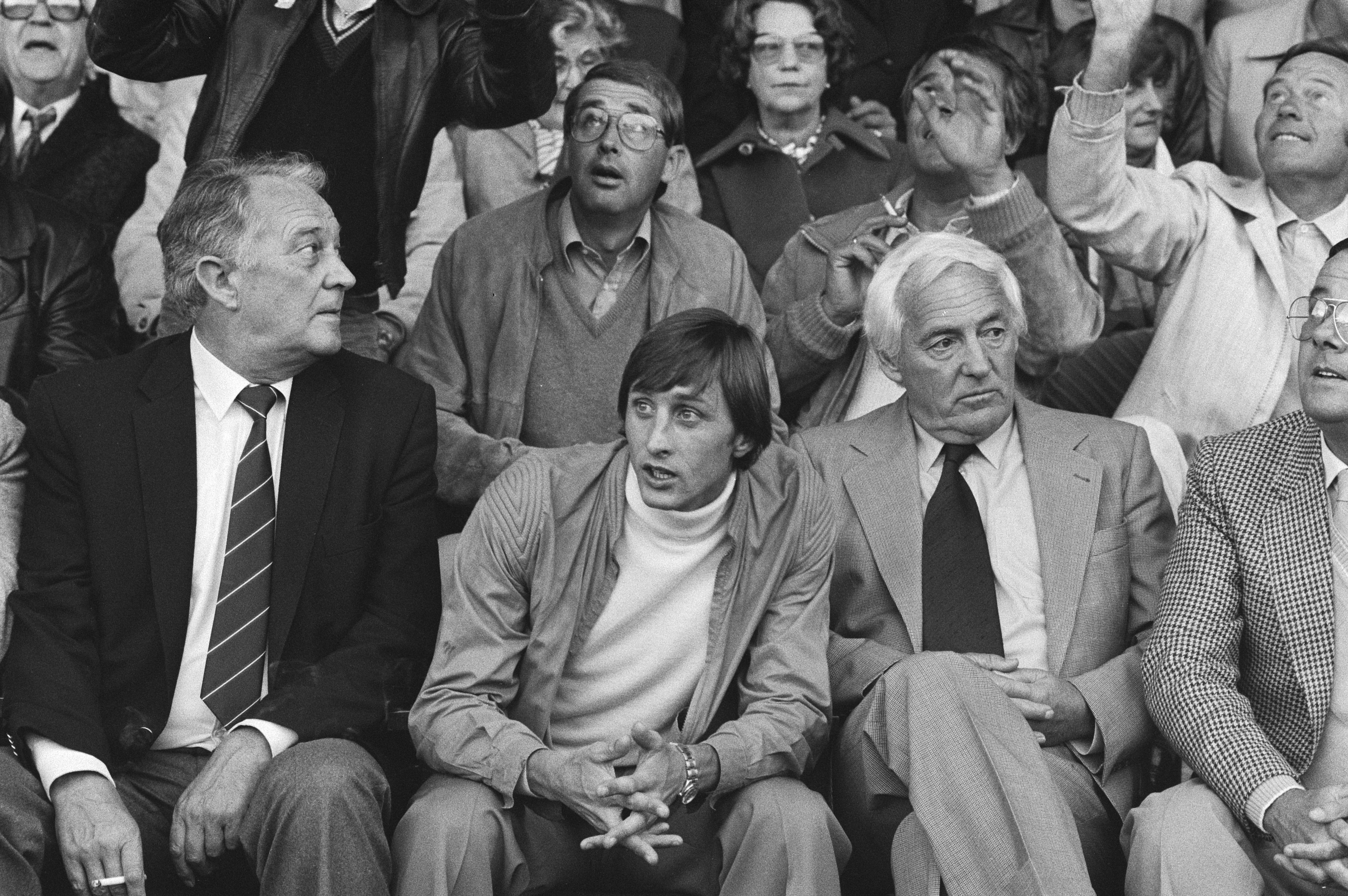
Cruyff with Cor Coster (on the right), his father-in-law and manager.

During the 1976–77 season in Barcelona, the Cruyffs had met French businessman Michel Basilevitch, who was a socis and made a favourable impression on the Cruyffs. Cruyff entrusted him – instead of his father-in-law Cor Coster – with extending his expiring contract with FC Barcelona by one year. Basilevitch was able to negotiate a salary increase, which made the Cruyffs like him all the more. Soon, Basilevitch became a confidant, and he and Cruyff began to establish a company called Grupeco Holding, which invested in various activities, including a pig farm. Critical press reports published that Cruyff had considerable tax debts and that his investments were failures.

In 1978, a bank made public that Grupeco Holding could no longer meet its obligations. The investments proved to be almost without exception failures and ended in ruin for Cruyff. His father-in-law got involved and spread in press interviews that Basilevitch had an affair with Cruyff's wife and had enriched himself fraudulently at Cruyff's expense. Basilevitch immediately countered Coster's accusations. He claimed to have suffered losses himself in the bankruptcy of Grupeco Holding and threatened to expose the dubious business practices of Cruyff and Coster, in which he had gained insight as a confidant of the Cruyffs. Coster (and thus also Cruyff) had for years channeled large sums of money past the tax authorities; for example, he claimed hand money for Cruyff was not declared in the tax return, and Coster had in part also transferred funds to Switzerland for the purpose of tax avoidance. Thus Coster was forced to back down. Fearing further revelations about his own business activities, he refrained from further charges. Due to the bankruptcy, Cruyff was forced to continue playing as a footballer. He left Spain with enormous debts, which were not even remotely paid off until his return years later.

Cruyff and his family moved to the United States. Cruyff insisted that his decision to resume his playing career in the United States was pivotal in his career, stating, "It was wrong, a mistake, to quit playing at 31 with the unique talent I possessed", and adding, "Starting from zero in America, many miles away from my past, was one of the best decisions I made. There I learned how to develop my uncontrolled ambitions, to think as a coach and about sponsorship."

In May 1979, Cruyff signed a lucrative deal with the Los Angeles Aztecs of the North American Soccer League (NASL). He had previously been rumoured to be joining the New York Cosmos, but the deal did not materialise; he played a few exhibition games for the Cosmos. He stayed at the Aztecs for only one season, and was voted NASL Player of the Year. After considering an offer to join Dumbarton in Scotland, in February 1980, he moved to play for the Washington Diplomats. The Cruyffs settled in at Tracy Place, an area with various representative embassies and mansions of politicians, where they formed friendships with diplomats, politicians, and executives. He played the whole 1980 campaign for the Diplomats, even as the team was facing dire financial trouble. At the Diplomats, Cruyff had to fight for his position on the team; he initially clashed with teammates and coach because he skipped team evenings (due to his wife) and smoked in the shower. The team was also accustomed to a completely different style of play than what Cruyff wanted to teach them – the Diplomats played deliberately physical and used to play kick and rush with long, wide passes, as was done on the British Isles.

The frustrated Cruyff soon voiced his complaints about coach and teammates to journalists. However, on the field, he immediately made a difference in class. At the Washington Diplomats, he also became familiar with and appreciative of the US-typical sports marketing. He began, at a local TV station, to advertise football. This brought him into contact with Eunice Kennedy Shriver, a member of the Kennedy clan, who had dedicated herself years ago as an activist for the work for people with disabilities and had founded the Special Olympics in 1968; at her request, Cruyff became an ambassador for the Special Olympics; after this experience, Cruyff began to advocate for disadvantaged children. Since the Diplomats had meanwhile declared bankruptcy, Cruyff's time in the USA ended abruptly. Looking back on his years in the US, he later said that this phase had given him back the joy in football that he had temporarily lost.

=== Return to Spain with Levante and second spell at Washington Diplomats ===
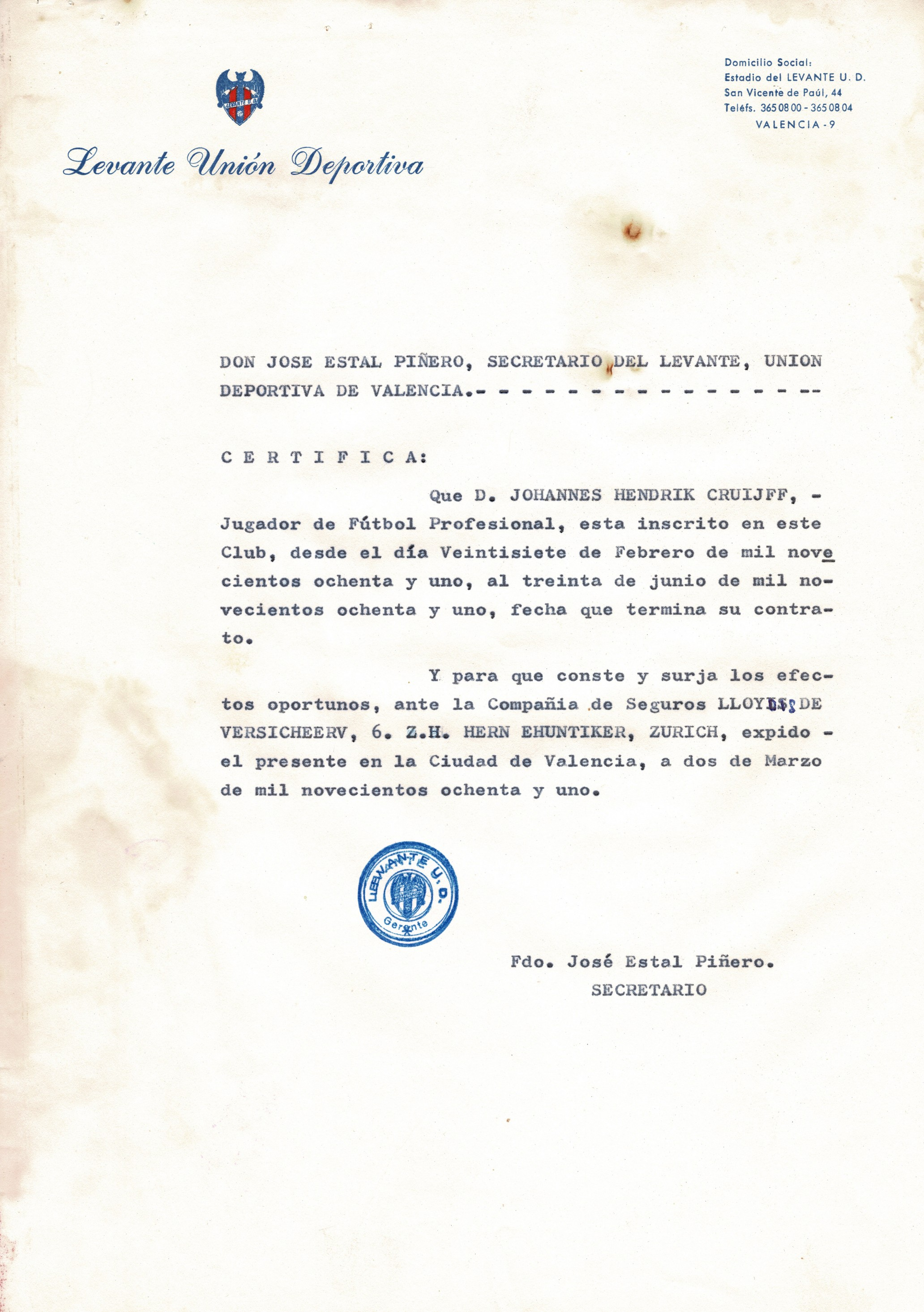
Document issued by Levante UD to confirm the incorporation of Cruyff to their team

Cruyff returned to Europe in November 1980. He became a "technical advisor" at Ajax, where he trained with the team but did not play, and soon fell out and clashed with manager Leo Beenhakker. In January 1981, Cruyff played three friendly matches for FC Dordrecht. Also in January 1981, manager Jock Wallace of English club Leicester City made an attempt to sign Cruyff, competing with Arsenal and an unnamed German club for his services, and despite negotiations lasting three weeks, in which Cruyff expressed his desire to play for the club, a deal could not be reached.

After the move to English club Leicester City fell through, Cruyff instead chose to sign with Spanish Segunda División side Levante in February 1981. His subsequent stint with the Spanish second-division side Levante was also financially rewarding for Cruyff, but entirely unsatisfying from a sporting perspective. His biographer, Auke Kok, considers his time at Levante an absolute low point, both from a professional and a personal standpoint. Cruyff, who had not played a match for months, was in poor health and suffering from several minor injuries. Furthermore, he was more preoccupied with the health of his wife Danny, who was initially bedridden after a fall from a horse and, after a deterioration of her condition, had to be admitted to a hospital.

On the pitch, Cruyff unsuccessfully attempted to establish his preferred Total Football style of attacking football. The mid-season tactical change proved a complete failure, and Cruyff, plagued by minor injuries, reached his limits in the second division, characterised by its intense physicality. Levante ultimately finished the season in ninth place. Only part of the promised sum was paid to him. In May 1981, he then made a highly lucrative guest appearance for AC Milan in a mini-tournament of friendly matches. Due to injury, he only played half a half; before his departure, he promised to make up for it, but this never happened. In June 1981, Cruyff returned to the US. He played for the Washington Diplomats in 1981 NASL season.

=== Second spell at Ajax ===
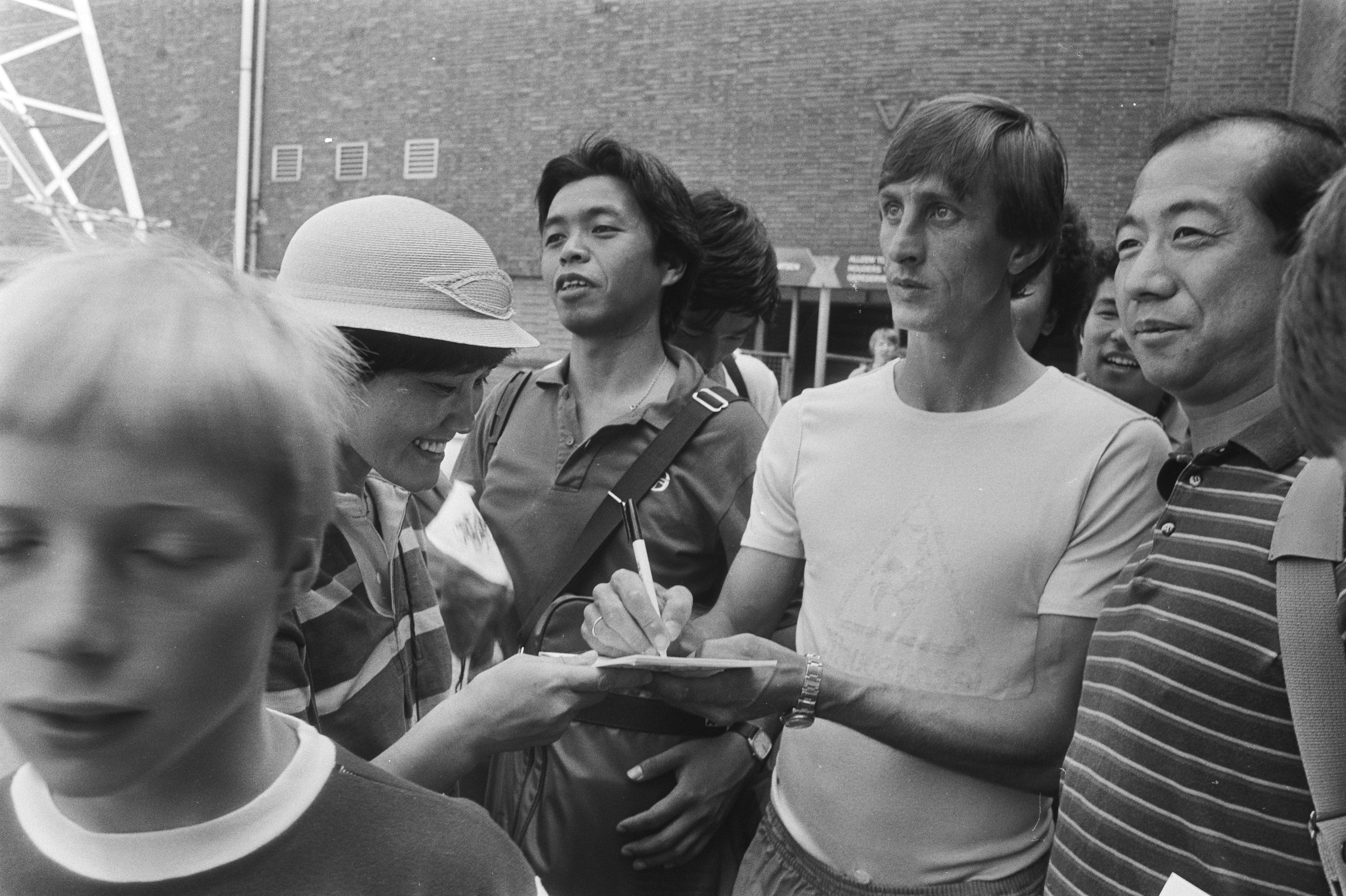
Cruyff with Japanese fans in 1982

After his spell in the U.S. and his short-lived stay in Spain, Cruyff returned to playing for Ajax in December 1981. Originally, he had rejoined Ajax on 30 November 1980, before his time as a player with Levante, as "technical advisor" to trainer Leo Beenhakker, Ajax being eighth in the league table at the time after 13 games played. After 34 games, Ajax finished the 1980–81 season in second. In December 1981, Cruyff signed a contract as "player" with Ajax until the summer of 1983. Alongside an economic crisis in the country, Dutch football had also been in a downward spiral for years. Internationally, Oranje had failed to qualify for the 1982 finals. This decline was accompanied by falling stadium attendances. At his own request, Cruyff signed a performance-based contract with Ajax Amsterdam, which guaranteed him higher earnings if stadium attendance increased. David Winner considers Cruyff's last three seasons, in the autumn of his career, remarkable.

As a playmaker, Cruyff inspired a group of young players who formed the backbone of the Oranje's 1988 European Championship title. At 34 years old and no longer at his physical peak, he compensated for his physical shortcomings with his comparatively outstanding understanding of the game and his vision, which allowed him to anticipate game situations earlier than his opponents; a system that Cruyff mastered to perfection during these years, according to his biographers. He also benefited from a tacit non-aggression pact that opposing coaches made with Cruyff; they instructed their defenders to play "cleanly" and not to foul the crowd-pleaser Cruyff excessively. In addition, Cruyff, as usual, influenced the referees, allowing him to operate largely freely on the pitch. In retrospect, referee Charles Corver later admitted that he had sometimes allowed himself to be manipulated by Cruyff and that his decisions were sometimes influenced by Cruyff.

At Ajax, Cruyff encountered a group of talented young players such as Frank Rijkaard, Ronald Koeman, Gerald Vanenburg, and Marco van Basten; he quickly assumed the leadership role within the team and exerted his influence on both lineup and tactics. In his sold-out home debut against HFC Haarlem, Cruyff dribbled past two opponents in the 22nd minute and scored a goal. With Cruyff, Ajax became significantly more consistent compared to previous years and secured the championship five matchdays before the end of the 1981–82 season. In 1982, he scored a famous goal against Helmond Sport. While playing for Ajax, Cruyff scored a penalty the same way Rik Coppens had done it 25 years earlier. He put the ball down as for a routine penalty kick, but instead of shooting at goal, Cruyff nudged the ball sideways to teammate Jesper Olsen, who in return passed it back to Cruyff to tap the ball into the empty net, as Otto Versfeld, the Helmond goalkeeper, looked on. At the end of the 1982–83 season, Ajax, along with Cruyff, again became league champions. Additionally Ajax won the Dutch Cup (KNVB-Beker).

=== Final season at Feyenoord and retirement ===
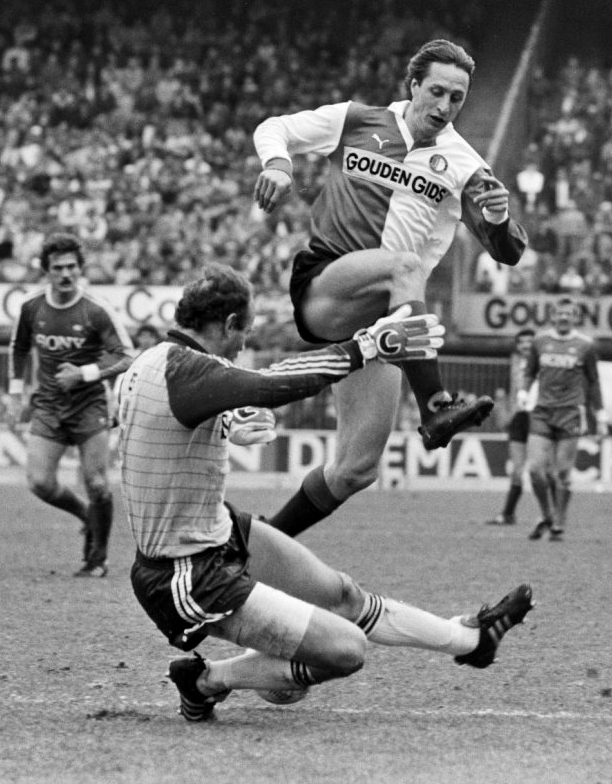
Feyenoord against AZ'67 5–2; Johan Cruyff jumps over goalkeeper Treytel.

After that, Cruyff wanted to extend his contract to play for one last year. Ajax board member Tom Harmsen, however, rejected a contract extension. This angered Cruyff, who responded by signing for Ajax's archrivals Feyenoord. Feyenoord's team had been mediocre for years and, apart from the young Ruud Gullit and Peter Houtman, unlike Ajax, had no highly talented players in its ranks. On the seventh matchday, Feyenoord faced Ajax in "De Klassieker" in Amsterdam; the game was lost 8–2. A defiant Cruyff nevertheless declared after the game: "We will win the championship." Feyenoord also suffered heavy defeats in the UEFA Cup; in the game against Tottenham Hotspur, Cruyff was completely neutralised by his opponent Glenn Hoddle as Tottenham won 6–2 on aggregate.

Undeterred by these initial defeats, Cruyff influenced tactics, training, and lineup, importing his football knowledge. While rival Ajax played erratically, Cruyff's well-organised Feyenoord usually won unspectacularly but consistently and was already leading the table by winter. In February 1984, Ajax were first defeated in the KNVB Cup, then 4–1 in the second leg of the league season, with Cruyff also scoring a goal. At the end of the season, the team won the double of league title and KNVB Cup. Because of his performance on the field, he was voted as Dutch Footballer of the Year for the fifth time. On 13 May 1984, he played his last match against Zwolle. He rejected offers from the club to extend his contract, as he was no longer able to meet the physical demands of the game. Cruyff played his last game in Saudi Arabia against Al-Ahli, bringing Feyenoord back into the game with a goal and an assist.

== International career ==
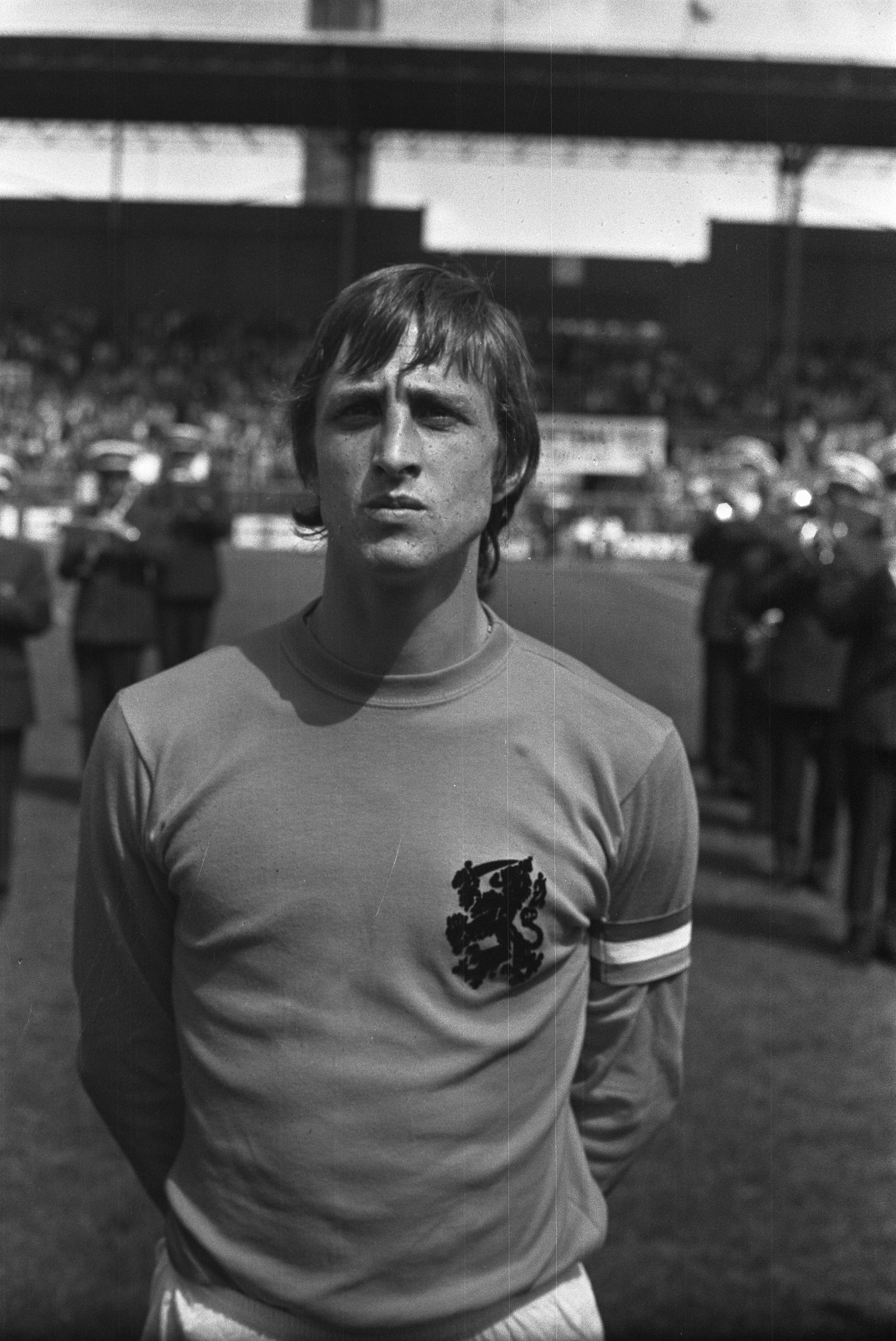
Cruyff as captain of the Netherlands prior to a game at the 1974 World Cup

As a Dutch international, Cruyff played 48 matches, scoring 33 goals. The national team never lost a match in which Cruyff scored. On 7 September 1966, he made his official debut for the Netherlands in the UEFA Euro 1968 qualifier against Hungary, scoring in the 2–2 draw. In his second match, a friendly against Czechoslovakia, Cruyff was the first Dutch international to receive a red card. The Royal Dutch Football Association (KNVB) banned him from international games, but not the Eredivisie or KNVB Cup.

Accusations of Cruyff's "aloofness" were not rebuffed by his habit of wearing a shirt with only two black stripes along the sleeves, as opposed to Adidas' usual design feature of three, worn by all the other Dutch players. Cruyff also had a separate sponsorship deal with Puma. From 1970 onwards, he wore the number 14 jersey for the Netherlands, setting a trend for wearing shirt numbers outside the usual starting line-up numbers of 1 to 11.

=== World Cup 1974 ===
Before training camp, Cruyff initiated tough negotiations with the federation regarding bonuses and lucrative sponsorship deals. During the training camp, Cruyff and the Ajax players quickly reconciled. Neither side had any interest in reviving old disputes and they quickly came to an understanding. At the training camp in Zeist, Cruyff and the Ajax group were the dominant force. Rinus Michels, appointed as coach, constantly commuted between the Netherlands and Spain, where he was coaching FC Barcelona in the cup competition. Therefore, Cruyff played a key role; he assumed the role of player-coach (now with Michels' blessing) and dictated tactics as well as parts of the starting lineup. Players whom Cruyff criticised or who did not acknowledge the dominance of the "Amsterdammers" were immediately sidelined or sent home.

The experienced first-choice goalkeeper, Jan van Beveren, defied the "Amsterdammers" and was promptly sent home. Instead, at Cruyff's instigation, Jan Jongbloed was installed as the first-choice goalkeeper. Cruyff justified this not only as part of the group dynamics within the team, but also saw Jongbloed as the better player with the ball and a disguised libero, which in his eyes was important due to the team's attacking style. The libero role was also determined by Cruyff, who assigned the task to midfielder Arie Haan; while he had had disagreements with Haan at Ajax in 1973, he nevertheless valued his passing accuracy. In addition, Wim Rijsbergen from Feyenoord Rotterdam was installed as the second central defender. Tactically, according to Cruyff's vision, Oranje were to play a riskier version of Total Football, as practiced by Ajax.

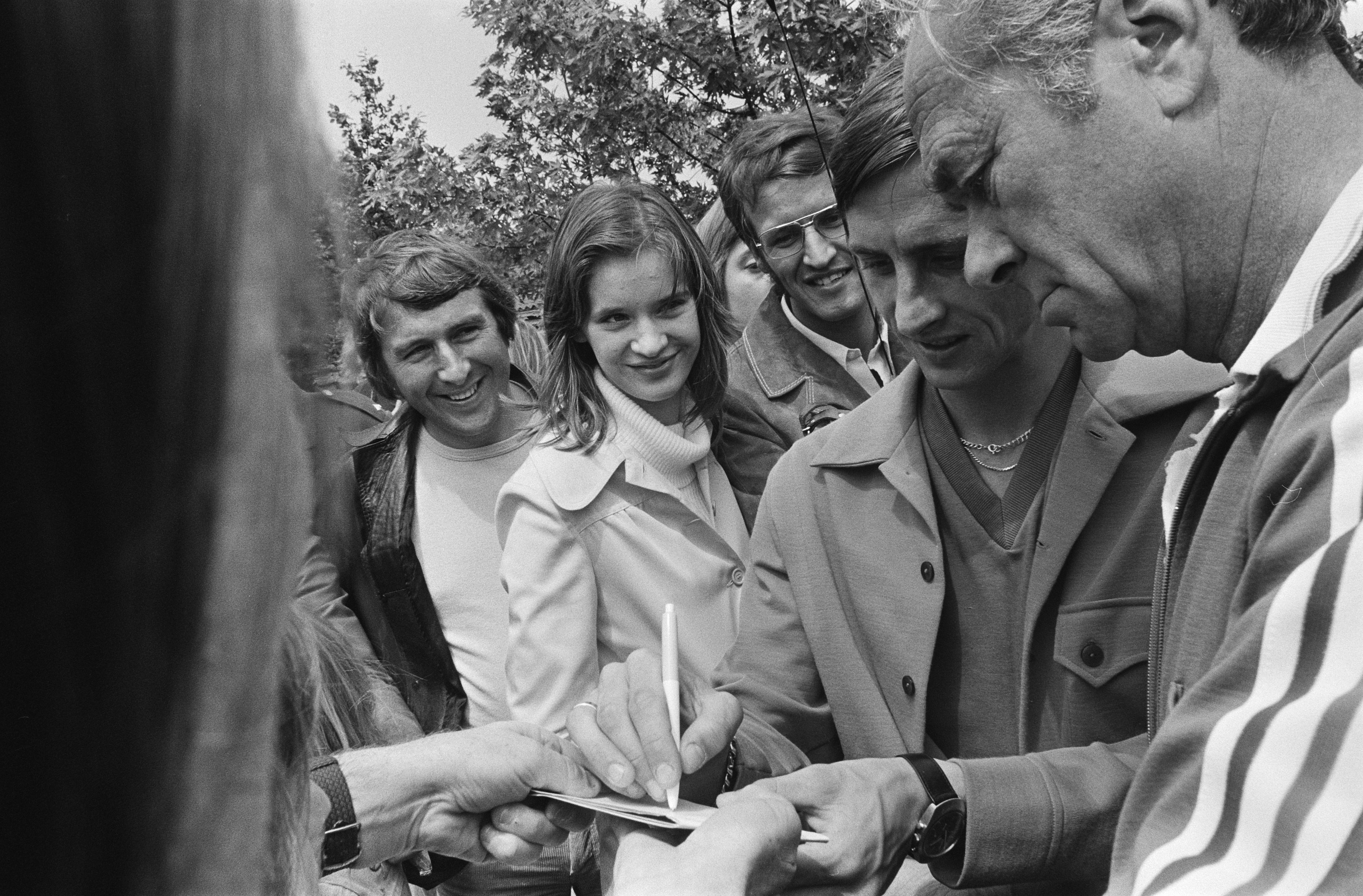
A relaxed Cruyff is giving autographs at Hiltrup

In their opening match in Hanover, the Netherlands defeated a defensively minded Uruguay 2–0. In the second game against Sweden, Cruyff performed the so-called "Cruyff Turn"; he kicked the ball so suddenly with his heel past his own leg that the startled defender Jan Olsson lost his footing. Cruyff had been using this move for years in the Netherlands, so it no longer attracted much attention from Dutch reporters and the public, but for the rest of the football world, it was a defining moment of the World Cup. In their 4–1 victory in the third group match against Bulgaria, the Netherlands thrilled the crowd. Cruyff was clearly the star, directing the team, creating gaps with his pacey dribbling and delivering precise long passes.

In the second group stage, the Dutch national team, led by Cruyff, improved once again and reached the peak of their abilities. In the opening match of the second group stage against Argentina, Cruyff again dominated the game; with his first touch, he rounded the Argentine goalkeeper Carnevali in the eleventh minute and scored to make it 1–0. After that, the team conserved their energy for a long time, with Cruyff remaining passive and only playing passes from a stationary position. In the 72nd minute, he set up the third goal and then scored the fourth goal himself.

Against East Germany, they achieved an easy victory. Cruyff initiated both of the Netherlands' goals as the provider. The final group match against Brazil was like a semi-final. Both sides played a very physical game from the start, resulting in many hard fouls. After just a few minutes, Cruyff was denied by the goalkeeper from close range. The first half was evenly matched, and the Netherlands were fortunate when Brazil players Valdomiro and Jairzinho both missed two clear chances. Cruyff decided the game with two actions after the break. First, he played a one-two with Neeskens, who scored to make it 1–0. A quarter of an hour later, he converted a cross from Ruud Krol to make it 2–0. After that, the game descended into chaos; there were several frustrated fouls by the beaten Brazilians, and Luís Pereira received a red card. The Netherlands advanced to the final, where they were considered as clear favourites over the hosts West Germany. The football world was thrilled by the seemingly effortless play of these victories and raved about the team's artistry. While the other teams, due to the changed security situation after the 1972 Munich Olympics attack, kept a tight rein on themselves, the self-assured Netherlands maintained a much more open approach at their headquarters in Hiltrup; Cruyff himself gave interviews and signed autographs there almost on a daily basis.

Before the final, a scandal erupted over the infamous pool party: Cruyff and some other players had partied with girls the day before the match against Brazil, and the German Bild newspaper published a story the next day with the headline: Cruyff, Champagne, Naked Girls and a Cool Bath. In the days that followed, Cruyff had to repeatedly justify himself to his wife in hours-long phone calls, as she called repeatedly and threatened divorce. The sleep-deprived Cruyff, fearing for his marriage, was less concerned with the opponent than with the pool party story.

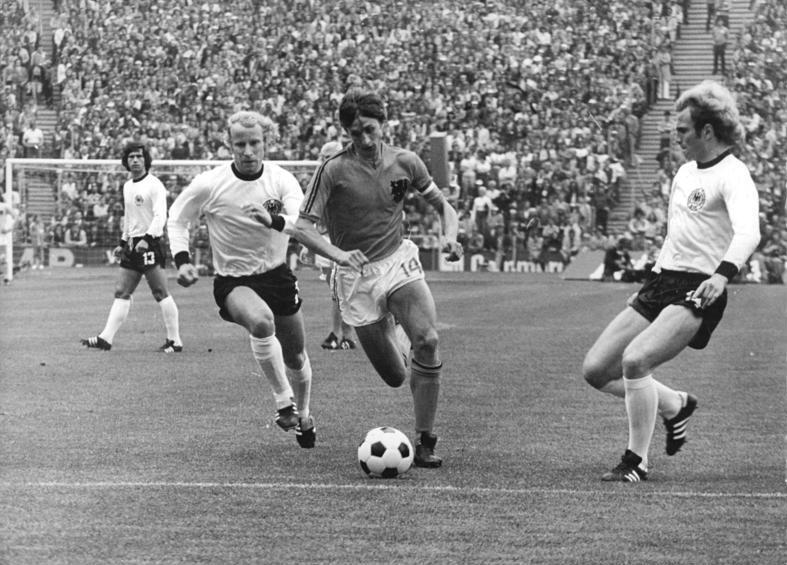
Cruyff in the final, pursued by Berti Vogts, shortly before he is fouled by Hoeneß

In the Netherlands, the events surrounding the pool party were considered crucial; however, it was ignored for years that the Netherlands had not prepared at all for the game against the West German team, as coach Michels was in Barcelona in the days before the final and the assistant coach responsible for observing the opponents had been sent home early. In the final in Munich, after the kickoff and some initial ball circulation among the Elftal players, Cruyff received the ball at the centre circle within seconds, hesitated briefly, and then suddenly surged towards goal, followed by his marker, Berti Vogts. Cruyff was fouled by Uli Hoeneß on the edge of the penalty area; referee Jack Taylor immediately awarded a penalty, which Neeskens converted. The Germans had not yet touched the ball. After the goal, the German team was visibly shaken, but the Dutch national team did not press forward. Instead, they confidently circulated the ball amongst themselves without looking for a shot, and the German team recovered.

The German team gained the initiative and was able to equalise through a penalty won by Bernd Hölzenbein. The German team began to dominate the game at times. Cruyff's influence was stifled by the effective marking of Vogts. Cruyff dropped deep into midfield, and disappeared completely for long periods of the game. A goal by Gerd Müller gave West Germany a 2–1 lead at halftime. At halftime, the protesting Cruyff had a verbal altercation with the referee and received a yellow card. After the break, the Netherlands launched a furious attack, but the score remained unchanged, and Oranje ultimately lost to the host nation. The German sports journalist Ulfert Schröder called Munich "the melancholic high point" of Cruyff's career. While Franz Beckenbauer said of Cruyff that "Johan was the better player, but I am a world champion", Cruyff, who was voted the tournament's best player, repeatedly described the defeat in later years as a moral victory. The lost final, however, became a Dutch trauma.

=== Euro 1976 ===
Between 1974 and 1976, the Netherlands played successfully in the qualifying rounds for the 1976 European Championship, in which four teams participated. Michels had been replaced by George Knobel, who submitted unconditionally to Cruyff and gave him free rein. In response to Cruyff's dominance, PSV players Jan van Beveren and Willy van der Kuylen retired from the national team. Before Euro 1976, Cruyff again initiated negotiations with the federation regarding bonuses and sponsorship contracts, which dragged on and on and completely overshadowed the sporting aspect. The federation and the Cruyff/Knobel duo were also at odds over the Chef d'équipe. The match against Czechoslovakia was actually intended by the self-confident Dutch as merely a warm-up before a rematch against Germany, but turned out to be completely different. The Czechs disrupted the Dutch rhythm and took an early lead. In the end, it was a clear defeat. Cruyff left before the third-place match to undergo knee surgery in Barcelona.

=== After 1976 ===
Cruyff retired from international football in October 1977, having helped the national team qualify for the upcoming World Cup. Without him, the Netherlands finished runners-up in the World Cup again. Initially, there were two rumours as to his reason for missing the 1978 World Cup: either he missed it for political reasons (a military dictatorship was in power in Argentina at that time), or that his wife dissuaded him from playing. In 2008, Cruyff stated to the journalist Antoni Bassas in Catalunya Ràdio that he and his family were subject to a kidnap attempt in Barcelona a year before the tournament, and that this had caused his retirement. "To play a World Cup you have to be 200% okay, there are moments when there are other values in life."

== Coaching career ==
=== Entry into management with Ajax ===
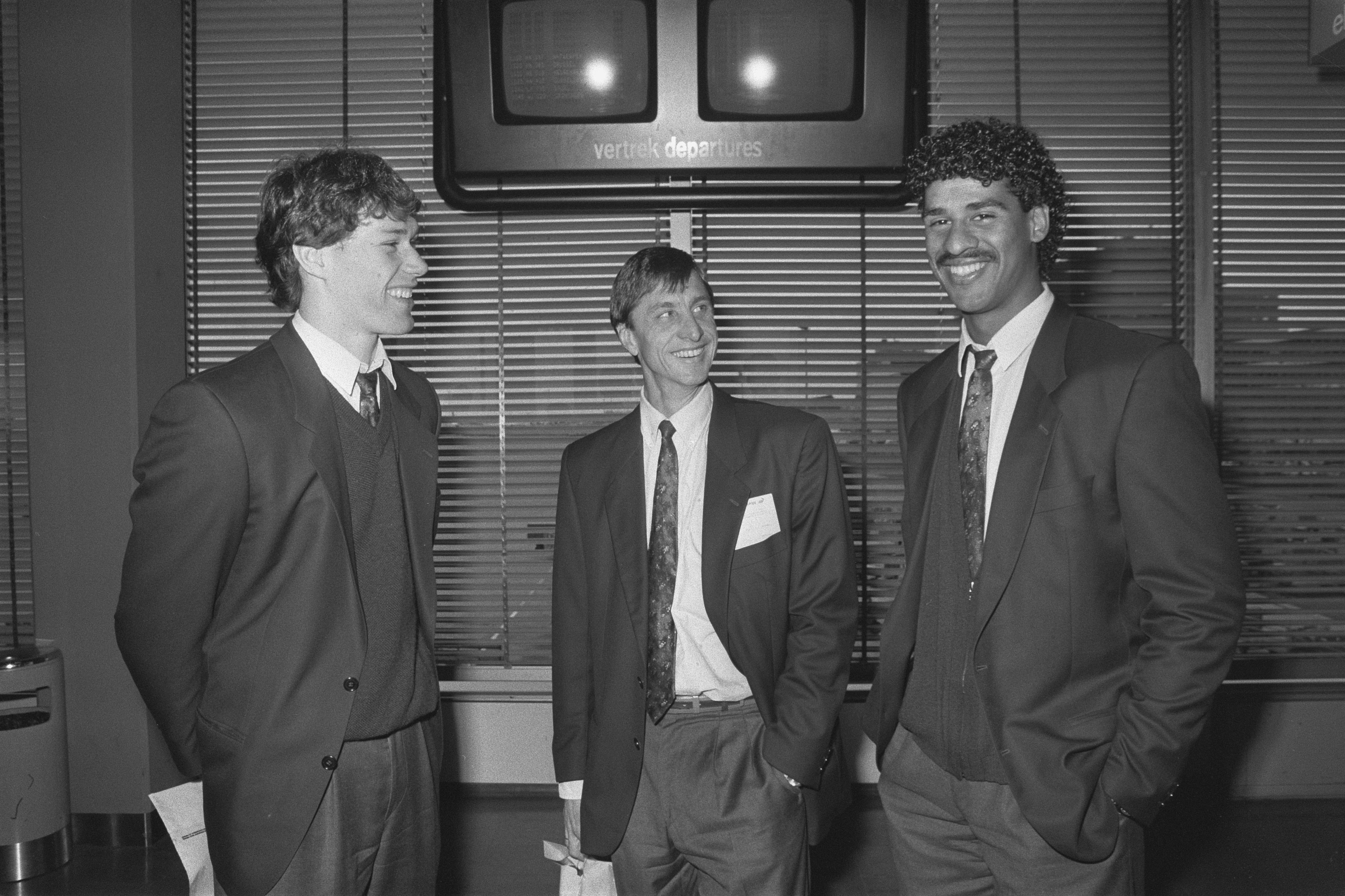
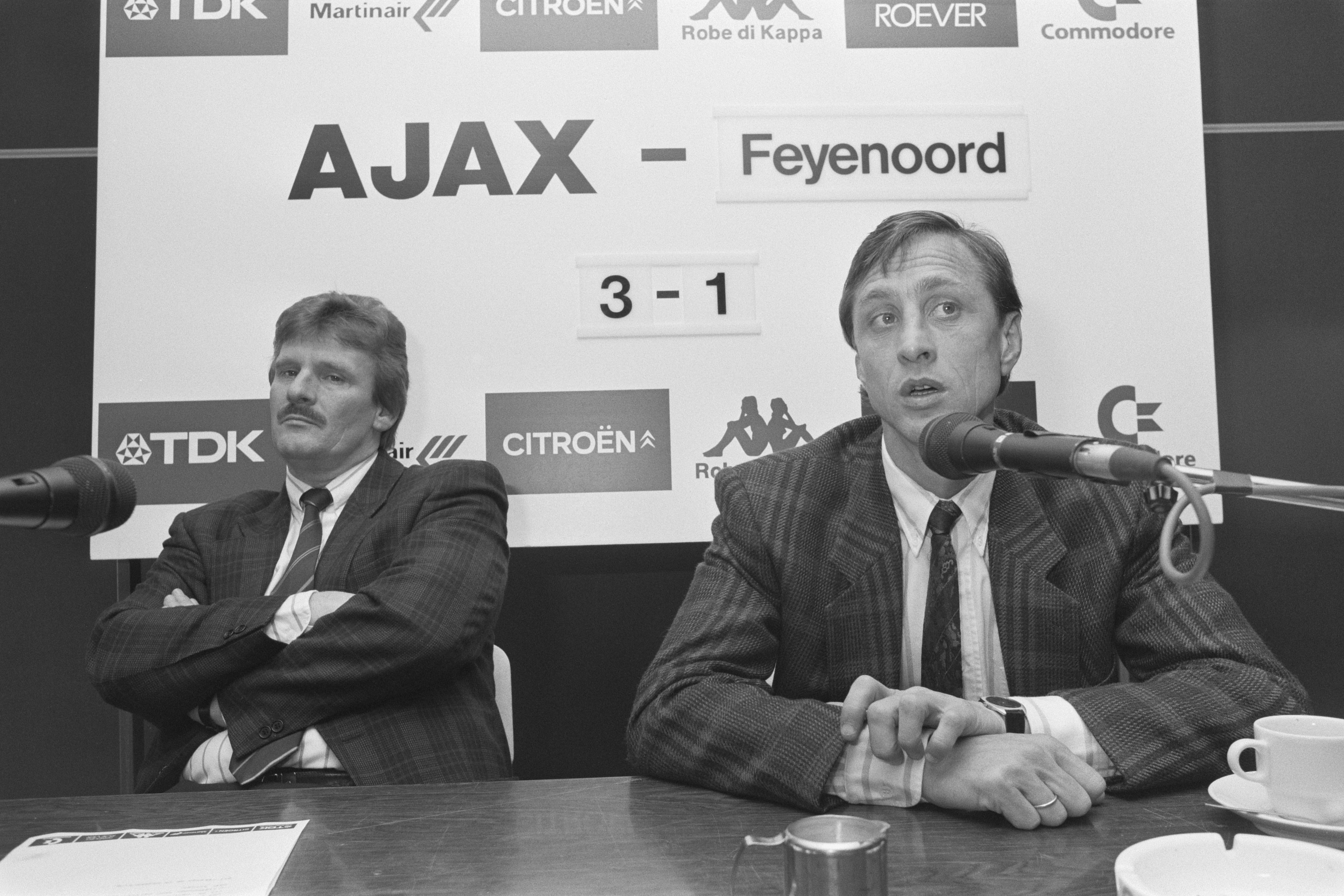
Two images of Cruyff as Ajax manager: (left): with Van Basten and Rijkaard in 1986; (right): during a press conference in November 1987

After retiring from playing, Cruyff followed in the footsteps of his mentor Rinus Michels. In June 1985, Cruyff returned to Ajax again. He coached a young Ajax side to victory in the European Cup Winners' Cup in 1987 (1–0). In the 1985–86 season, the league title was lost to Jan Reker's PSV, despite Ajax having a goal difference of +85 (120 goals for, 35 goals against). In the 1985–86 and 1986–87 seasons, Ajax won the KNVB Cup.

It was during this period as manager that Cruyff was able to implement his favoured team formation—three mobile defenders; plus one more covering space – becoming, in effect, a defensive midfielder (from Rijkaard, Blind, Silooy, Verlaat, Larsson, Spelbos), two "controlling" midfielders (from Rijkaard, Scholten, Winter, Wouters, Mühren, Witschge) with responsibilities to feed the attack-minded players, one second striker (Bosman, Scholten), two touchline-hugging wingers (from Bergkamp, van't Schip, De Wit, Witschge) and one versatile centre forward (from Van Basten, Meijer, Bosman).

=== Return to Barcelona as manager and building "the Dream Team" ===
After having appeared for the club as a player, Cruyff returned to Barcelona for the 1988–89 season, this time to take up his new role as coach of the first team. In 1988, FC Barcelona was going through major turbulence both on and off the field. Since Cruyff's departure in 1978, there had been a lack of an overarching sporting philosophy, and the playing style had varied with each coach in charge. English coach Terry Venables had guided Barça to their first championship title since 1974 in 1985. In 1986, the team reached the final of the European Cup (in Seville) but lost in a penalty shootout to the clear underdog Steaua Bucharest, which went down in the club's and fans' history as the "Seville trauma". The defeat undermined Venables' position at the club and subjected him to ongoing criticism; among other things, Venables was accused of favouring the British players. After an unsuccessful following season, he was dismissed and replaced by Luis Aragonés. Under Aragonés, the team again played a disappointing season and were eliminated in the UEFA Cup quarter-finals by Bayer Leverkusen. In the championship, by April 1988, the team was already 23 points behind the eventual champions Real Madrid. At this moment, the 'Hesperia mutiny' occurred, in which the players and coach Luis Aragonés (who stood loyally by his players) had initiated an open rebellion against President Núñez and demanded him to resign. After the Hesperia mutiny, President Núñez was in a weak position within the club just before the upcoming re-election of the presidency. The signing of Cruyff, who was widely respected both within the club and in Catalonia, is generally described as a populist move intended to relieve the unpopular and criticised Núñez. According to British authors Jonathan Wilson, Simon Kuper, and Sid Lowe, the signing of the famously headstrong Cruyff would never have happened otherwise.

Cruyff retained his previous assistant Tonny Bruins Slot and hired his former teammate Carles Rexach as assistant coach. He banned the board members from the locker room. With Barça, Cruyff also started work with a completely remodelled side after the previous season's scandal. As Sid Lowe noted, when Cruyff took over as manager, Barcelona of the late 1980s "were a club in debt and in crisis. Results were bad, performances were worse, the atmosphere terrible and attendances down, while even the relationship between the president of the club Josep Lluís Núñez and the president of the Spanish autonomous community they represented, Jordi Pujol, had deteriorated. It did not work immediately but he [Cruyff] recovered the identity he had embodied as a player. He took risks, and rewards followed."

Even more so than at Ajax, Cruyff soon showed himself as a radical innovator as Barca's coach, acting very differently from other coaches, questioning common practices, and completely turning many traditionally existing rules on their head. First, he changed the training. The morning training sessions previously consisted mainly of long-distance runs in the forest or on the tartan track. Cruyff, on the other hand, introduced rondos as the basis of training. Rondos are a concept in which several players position themselves in a circle, with one or two players in the middle. While the players positioned in the circle play one-touch football and pass the ball to each other, the player or players in the middle try to prevent this and win the ball. Rondos had long been a playful part of training sessions for many teams and were not, in themselves, an invention of Cruyff. Cruyff, who often participated in the exercises himself, elevated rondos from a rather playful occasional warm-up exercise to the center of training and made them the central training unit, which was intended to prepare players practically for the demands of the game. For Cruyff, rondos were an ideal exercise to promote understanding, technique, and speed of action. As another cornerstone of his training sessions, Cruyff had exercises practiced in variable units (9 against 7, 7 against 5) to achieve numerical superiority in the game. This took place on a shortened field to increase the technical difficulty and then give the players an advantage on a full field.

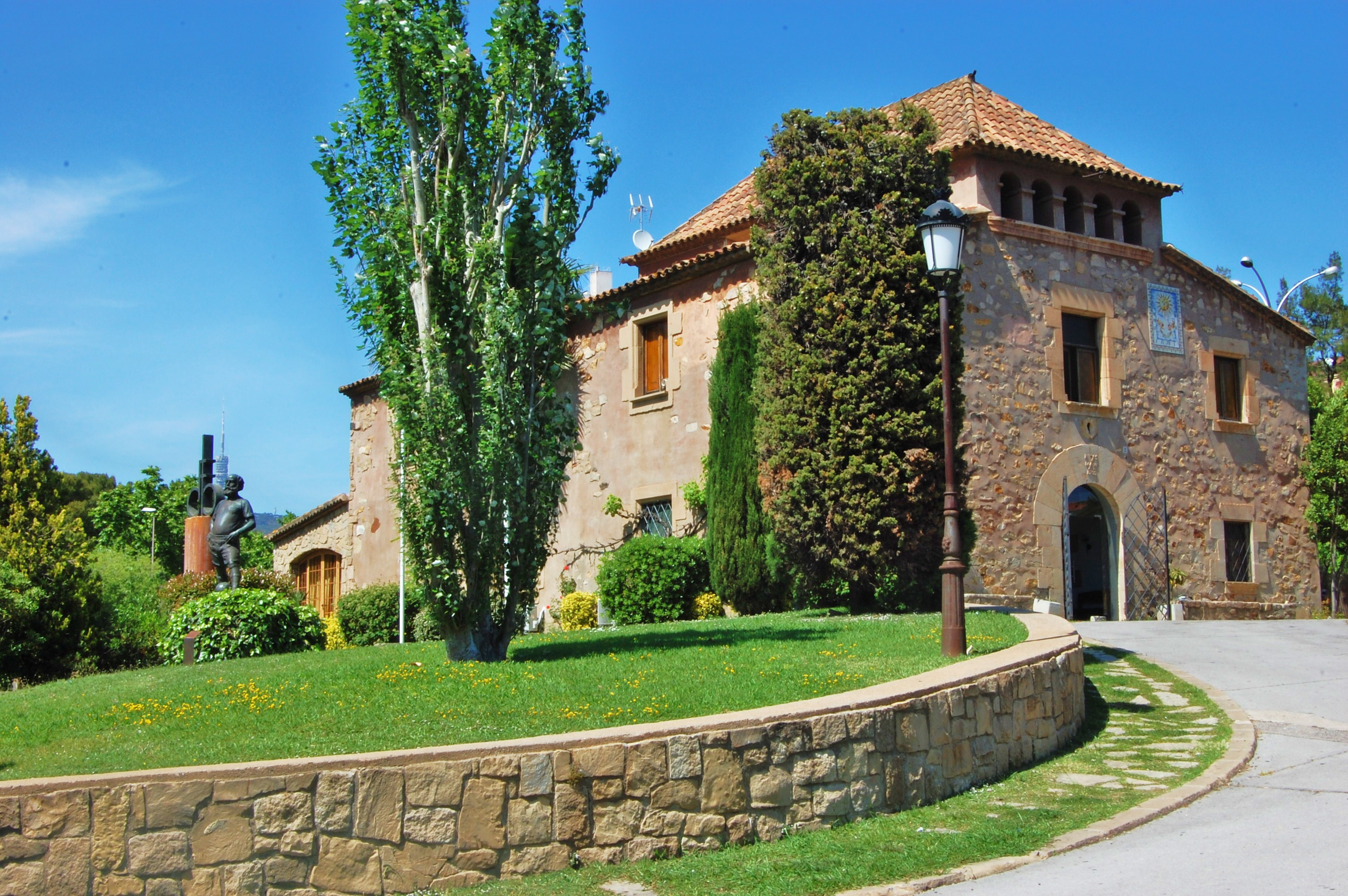
Main façade of old La Masia, the Barcelona youth academy

In addition, Cruyff soon revolutionised the work of the youth department. He made regular visits to the La Masia training academy and turned the previously applicable guidelines on their head. For coaches in youth departments not only at FC Barcelona but at almost all clubs of that time, physical attributes such as height were a central criterion in the development of players. Using an X-ray measurement of the wrist bones, the expected height of the boys was predicted; boys who were unlikely to reach a height of 1.80 meters were weeded out. Cruyff, on the other hand, overturned these criteria and thereby initiated a rethinking in world football in the following decades. He ignored a player's physical height, arguing that smaller players have a low center of gravity and thus good ball control. He dismissed counterarguments about possible disadvantages in standard situations. The speed of the players was also an attribute he considered negligible. He identified the young Pep Guardiola, who played in the B team, as a promising talent. Intelligent and strong in passing, the young Guardiola was actually considered by the coaches at La Masia to be too fragile and too slow to achieve significant success in professional sports. However, Cruyff integrated him into the first team in his second year as a coach, where over the years he became a central part of the team. As coach at Barcelona, Cruyff was also inspired by the other sports practiced; in particular, he often met with the club's handball coach, Valero Rivera, at Barça's Joan Gamper training centre for a joint exchange of ideas.

The squad saw a radical overhaul. Following the Hesperia revolt, 15 of the 21 players were dismissed at the insistence of the board. Among them were many key players, such as Víctor Muñoz, fan favorite Ramón Calderé, and the talented but notoriously unpredictable Bernd Schuster. Cruyff only saved goalkeeper Andoni Zubizarreta and captain Alexanko from being sold, even though the latter had been a ringleader in the mutiny. Cruyff gradually replaced the English contingent in the squad with young Catalan/Basque players. To initially fill the resulting gaps, Cruyff brought left-back Sergi and midfielders Luis Milla and Guillermo Amor into the first team from the youth academy. Twelve new players were signed, of whom striker Julio Salinas, José Marí Bakero, winger Txiki Begiristain, Miquel Soler and midfielder Eusebio Sacristán became regular starters.

Cruyff immediately changed the game system. His predecessor Aragonés had used a defensive 4–4–2 as the basic formation, with the requirement to enable quick counter-attacks with the two central forwards Lineker and Carrasco. Cruyff switched to two basic formations: the 4–3–3 and a 3–4–3. In the 4–3–3 or 3–4–3, according to the geometrically thinking Cruyff, it is much easier in the game to form passing triangles and thus immediately offer the player receiving the ball another passing option. In contrast, the previously practiced 4–4–2 is a purely defensive tactic that does not allow for quick passing combinations and is at best destructive. During the course of the season, Cruyff varied the 4–3–3 system and established an even more offensive 3–4–3 as a second system, with which he had previously experimented in Amsterdam. In possession, he pushed one of the central defenders slightly forward from the defense into the defensive midfield to open up the game with him and create a numerical advantage in midfield. Against the ball, the 3–4–3 turned back into a 4–3–3, in which the defensive midfielder was supposed to drop back into central defense. Especially against lower-league, defensively set-up opponents, Cruyff used a 3–4–3 instead of the 4–3–3. As he had done at Ajax, he also required the youth teams to adapt the system to ensure a seamless transition for young talents into the professional team. With Cruyff, Barça experienced a glorious era. In the space of five years (1989–1994), he led the club to four European finals (two European Cup Winners' Cup finals and two European Cup/UEFA Champions League finals). Cruyff's track record includes one European Cup, four Liga championships, one Cup Winners' Cup, one Copa del Rey, and four Supercopa de España.

Cruyff's first season in the league was characterised by a close title fight between Barcelona and arch-rival Real Madrid. In the end, the direct encounters in El Clásico decided it; the first match, in October in Madrid, ended 3–2 in favor of Real Madrid after an eventful, evenly matched duel. In the return match in April, Real Madrid managed to secure a draw, which effectively ensured a preliminary decision in the title race. In the European Cup Winners' Cup, the team reached the final in Bern on 10 May 1989, where Barcelona faced Genoa–based club Sampdoria. Barcelona won the final 2–0 by goals from Salinas and López Rekarte, claiming the first title for Cruyff's team. Cruyff's new Barça took home the club's third Cup Winners' Cup. Even after his first year in office, Cruyff again removed many players who had proven to be unsuitable according to his standards. The high turnover in the squad caused unrest among fans and within the club. The most notable player to leave in the summer of 1989 was the disliked Gary Lineker, who returned to England. To replace him, Cruyff signed two players who would become cornerstones of the team in the following years: Michael Laudrup and Ronald Koeman. Laudrup was seen by Cruyff as a reincarnation of himself. He was often used as a false nine by him; Cruyff also encouraged Laudrup to act like he had previously on the field as a player-coach and to instruct his teammates. Like Rijkaard at Ajax, Laudrup also refused this; for this reason, Cruyff repeatedly reproached Laudrup.

The following season, 1989–90, was a setback; Barcelona was never able to prevent Real Madrid's title defense and ended up a distant third in the league. The notable success was reaching the final of the Spanish Cup competition (Copa del Rey): at the Mestalla Stadium, Barcelona won the final against Real Madrid. The triumph gave Cruyff a job guarantee for another year in view of the great unrest around the club due to the lack of success. The special environment of the club, referred to by Cruyff as Entorno ('environment'), a term he coined to describe the very specific environment of the club, puts coaches in a constant pressure situation and is wearing. It is characterised by two local newspapers (Sport and Mundo Deportivo), which report exclusively on sports, as well as local politicians and sponsors who interfere in the club. In this context, the democratically organised club with its Socis (the members of the club) is characterised as a constant hotbed for intrigues and rumours, in which current (and former) board members constantly intrigue against each other.

In the summer of 1990, the offensive player Hristo Stoitchkov was signed. Stoitchkov brought what Cruyff termed as mala leche ('bad milk'): aggressiveness and ruthlessness, which gave the cerebral passing game of his teammates in midfield an additional dimension. The third season, 1990–91, marked the breakthrough: Barcelona won the Spanish championship with a clear lead. In the final of the European Cup Winners' Cup, Barcelona faced Manchester United in Rotterdam. Barcelona had to do without Zubizarreta, Guillermo Amor, and Stoitchkov due to injuries and suspensions. In the game, they quickly fell 2–0 behind and were too late to turn the match around. In the following year (1991–92), there was a title duel in the league with Real Madrid until the last matchday; Real had led the table since October but lost on the final matchday in Tenerife, while Barcelona won and thus overtook Madrid. In the European Cup, Barcelona reached the final against Sampdoria Genoa. Cruyff's last instruction to his players before they stepped onto the pitch was Salid y disfrutad ('Go out and enjoy it' or 'Go out there and enjoy yourselves'). The match went to extra time after a scoreless draw. In the 111th minute, Ronald Koeman's free-kick goal won Barcelona the longed-for first title at the European Cup level in extra time. clinched Barça's first European Cup victory. The title cemented Cruyff's status within the club. In reference to the U.S. basketball team at the 1992 Olympics, the team was also called the "Dream Team" by fans and the media.

The 1992–93 season brought a rematch of the title fight with Real Madrid, and once again the decision came on the last matchday. Once again, the away-weak Real Madrid had to play in Tenerife, once again Real lost and Cruyff's team won the championship. In the summer of 1993, Cruyff signed the Brazilian centre forward Romario from PSV Eindhoven. Romario, considered by Cruyff the most talented player he had ever coached, completed the team. As the fourth foreign player, his signing meant that Cruyff had to put a foreign player on the bench each time. Cruyff usually chose to put Laudrup on the bench. Romario helped Barça to a 5–0 victory against Real Madrid in El Clásico with a hat-trick. In the league, a duel developed against Deportivo La Coruña. Once again, the decision came on the last matchday; Barcelona overturned a 2–1 deficit against Sevilla to win 5–2, while La Coruña could not get beyond a draw, thus giving Barcelona their fourth consecutive title.

During the 1993–94 Champions League season, Barcelona initially managed to equalise against Dynamo Kyiv and reach the next round, where they defeated FK Austria Vienna. In the final, they faced AC Milan. Going into the match, Barcelona were perceived as the favourites in the Spanish media; in his team talk before the match, Cruyff reportedly stated: "You're better than them, you're going to win". Cruyff opted to leave Laudrup on the bench. Milan's aggressive, high-pressing game put the slower players – Guardiola in central defensive midfield and the two center-backs Koeman and Miguel Nadal – under pressure right from the start. By this time, the midfield was controlled by Milan, and Barcelona was unable to initiate their usual passing sequences and utilise their attacking players Romario and Stoichkov, who never got involved. The match ended in a one-sided 4–0 victory for AC Milan. Cruyff was self-critical after the game: "It wasn't that we played badly, we didn't play at all."

For Simon Kuper, the defeat was a logical consequence. Like every innovator, Cruyff was ultimately overtaken by others. Rondos alone could no longer have met the increased physical demands of top-level football. The defeat in Athens initiated a hasty process of renewal that sealed the fate of the Dream Team. Cruyff reacted to the loss by initiating a radical rebuild and a complete overhaul of the squad. While still on the bus to the airport, Cruyff informed Zubizarreta that he would no longer play for Barça. Midfielders Goikoetxea and Julio Salinas were also immediately dropped. In addition, the dissatisfied Michael Laudrup left the team and joined arch-rivals Real Madrid. Romário, who arrived in Barcelona out of form and unmotivated after the 1994 World Cup, was also sold to Flamengo in Brazil during the winter transfer window. Both sportswriters Jonathan Wilson and Sid Lowe see Cruyff's radical reaction as the reason for the disintegration of the Dream Team, which also brought Barça's years-long title run to an end.

As replacements for the discarded players, the management, at Cruyff's urging, signed several new players: Gheorghe Hagi, Gica Popescu and Robert Prosinecki. Hagi was injured in the first few months of the new season, so Cruyff usually fielded his son Jordi as a replacement. The other new signings also had difficulties settling in. The 1994–95 season proved difficult. Laudrup, who had signed with Real Madrid, helped Real to a 5–0 thrashing of Barcelona at the Camp Nou. Barcelona finished the season as a distant fourth in the league. In the Champions League quarter-finals, Barcelona were eliminated by Paris Saint-Germain; Cruyff subsequently declared the end of the team publicly: "The cycle is over." The season ended without a title for the first time. President Núñez, long sidelined by Cruyff, saw his opportunity to regain control of the club and began to undermine Cruyff in the following season. While Luís Figo was signed, Núñez rejected a number of other players Cruyff wanted (including Steve McManaman and Ryan Giggs) and accused Cruyff (also publicly) of wasting money. For Cruyff, this was a breach of the existing agreement, which had guaranteed him full control over the team, new sporting signings, and non-interference from the president. The relationship between Cruyff and Núñez, which at best could be described as a partnership of convenience, quickly gave way to open hostility in the following 1995–96 season. Mutual accusations appeared in the press almost on a weekly basis.

Núñez blamed Cruyff's training methods for several injuries to key players and publicly stated that he intended to remove Cruyff and his coaching staff from responsibility for fitness training. Conversely, Cruyff publicly complained about the club's transfer dealings, which were increasingly slipping out of his control. He raged in the press, particularly about the missed opportunity to sign Zinédine Zidane from Girondins Bordeaux, who was being courted by numerous top clubs: "He's going to Italy, no? I had signed him in January." Increasingly, Cruyff came under fire from the press. Apart from his transfer policy, he was primarily accused of nepotism, as he had installed his completely untalented son-in-law, Jesús Angoy, as backup goalkeeper alongside his talented son, Jordi. It was alleged that Cruyff treated the club as his personal property. In April 1996, Barca lost to Atlético Madrid in the Copa del Rey final. Six days later, Barca lost to Bayern Munich at Camp Nou and were thus also eliminated from the UEFA Cup.

During the course of April and May 1996, rumours intensified that Cruyff's dismissal was imminent. Rumours said that the management had already met with English coach Bobby Robson to appoint him as Cruyff's replacement. Nevertheless, Cruyff continued working on rebuilding the team. He promoted the young Iván de la Peña from the B team to the first team. He also convinced midfielder Luis Enrique to transfer from Real Madrid to FC Barcelona. On 15 May 1996, the local derby against Espanyol Barcelona ended in a draw, practically ending any hopes of winning a title. On 18 May 1996, Vice President Joan Gaspart confronted Cruyff in the locker room. Upon greeting Gaspart, Cruyff called him "Judas" and accused President Núñez of lacking the courage to fire him personally. After increasingly loud mutual accusations and insults, Cruyff smashed a chair; Gaspart then threatened to call the police and formally dismissed Cruyff, saying, "You no longer belong here." Afterwards, Cruyff said goodbye to his players, some of whom were in tears.

=== Dutch national team ===
In 1990, most Dutch players wanted Cruyff as their coach for the upcoming World Cup tournament in Italy. Rinus Michels, who at that time was responsible at the Dutch KNVB, however, instead chose Leo Beenhakker as coach. Cruyff never forgave Michels; even in his autobiography, he speculated that Michels had denied him the coaching position out of jealousy. While still at Barcelona, Cruyff was in negotiations with the KNVB to manage the national team for the 1994 World Cup finals, but talks broke off at the last minute.

=== Catalonia football team ===
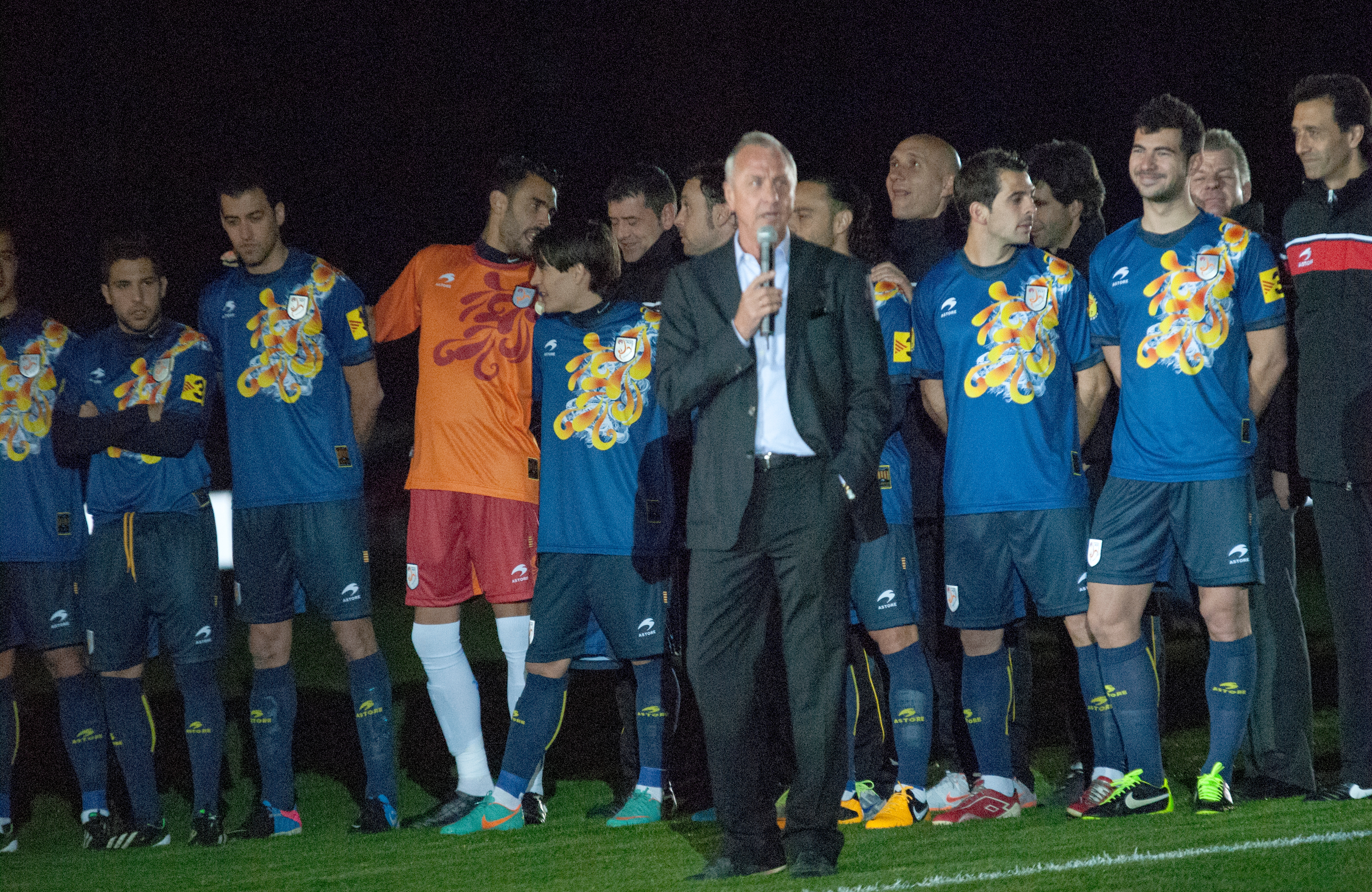
Cruyff with the Catalonia football team in January 2013

As well as representing Catalonia on the pitch in 1976, Cruyff also managed the Catalonia football team from 2009 to 2013, leading the team to a victory over Argentina in his debut match. On 2 November 2009, Cruyff was named as manager of the Catalonia football team. It was his first managing job in 13 years. On 22 December 2009, they played a friendly game against Argentina, which ended in a Catalonia win, 4–2 at Camp Nou. On 28 December 2010, Catalonia played a friendly against Honduras winning 4–0 at the Estadi Olímpic Lluís Companys. On 30 December 2011, Catalonia played Tunisia in a goalless draw at the Lluís Companys. In their last game under Cruyff, on 2 January 2013, Catalonia drew with Nigeria at the Cornellà-El Prat, 1–1.

== Post-coaching career ==
The British author Jonathan Wilson characterised Gaspart's words upon Cruyff's dismissal as a slip of the tongue. Contrary to Gaspart's statement that there was no one who ever belonged to Barça more than Johan Cruyff. For Wilson, however, this was a decisive moment – free from the everyday obligations of being a coach and relieved from the pressure of having to deliver good results every week – Cruyff could now even more strongly propagate his football-theoretical ideas. Within a short time, he became a kind of grey eminence, who on the one hand influenced Ajax and Dutch football, where he, in the words of David Winner, "became the personalised soul, conscience, and guiding point of Dutch football." On the other hand, he initially opposed in Barcelona his intimate enemy Núñez and his management along with the coaches he had hired.

In the 2000s, Cruyff's legacy and reputation increasingly took a divergent path in Spain and the Netherlands. While Cruyff was critically questioned in the Netherlands, he became an influential advisor and idea provider behind the scenes at FC Barcelona after Joan Laporta was elected president of the club, and his football philosophy soon became an established dogma under successive coaches. In contrast, football at Ajax and in the Netherlands as a whole developed for years in a different direction than Cruyff had demanded. Jonathan Wilson highlights the irony that Cruyff was more successful in shaping the much larger Spanish club entirely according to his will, while he repeatedly failed to implement his ideal at Ajax and in the Netherlands.

=== As a technical advisor ===
==== Spain: As consultant and advisor at Barca ====
Cruyff left in 1996, and never took another top job. The coaching position at Barcelona was temporarily taken over by his assistant Rexach; Cruyff, who had expected Rexach to resign with him, then broke off with Rexach and did not speak to him for years. Cruyff remained based in Barcelona and became part of Barcelona's Entorno himself. Even after his dismissal, the public petty war between Cruyff and Núñez continued with increasing intensity. Immediately after his dismissal, Cruyff publicly stated that if Barcelona needed him, he was willing to return, but never again under President Núñez. Due to the premature dismissal, Cruyff sued Núñez and FC Barcelona for a severance payment. The trial dragged on for years and ended for Cruyff only in a partial success.

Even after the appointment of Louis van Gaal as Robson's successor in the summer of 1997, Cruyff did not relent in his campaign against Barca's club management. Cruyff and van Gaal had formerly been teammates at Ajax, but had fallen out in the late 1980s. Although van Gaal is considered a Cruyffian as a coach in the sense of the same Ajax philosophy – Simon Kuper even calls him a lost brother of Cruyff due to various other biographical similarities – he was virtually criticised by Cruyff on a weekly basis. Jonathan Wilson has no doubt that Cruyff saw van Gaal's interpretation of the Ajax philosophy as inferior compared to his own. On a tactical level, Cruyff criticised that the tactical version of the Ajax school propagated by van Gaal lacked spontaneity and willingness to take risks. He also expressed criticism about van Gaal's so-called Hollandisation of the squad and publicly posed the rhetorical question of whether it was so difficult to hire a few Spaniards.

Conversely, Núñez tried to make Cruyff a pariah within the club. However, the manner of Cruyff's dismissal and his refusal to leave Barcelona for another coaching engagement had left deep divisions within FC Barcelona and had a polarising effect on the membership and also the environment. For parts of the socis, Núñez had become a figure of enmity. They accused him – besides a lack of identification with Catalan values – above all of dismissing Cruyff and of his treatment of Cruyff, which was perceived as unworthy. The environment, such as the media, was also polarised by the petty war between Núñez and Cruyff; while the sports newspaper Sport supported Laporta and Cruyff, the newspapers La Vanguardia and Mundo Deportivo were critical of Cruyffismo.

In 1999, Joan Laporta finally founded the interest group "Elefant Blau." Laporta mainly cited Núñez's handling of Cruyff, who had become an idol to parts of the club's membership, as the reason. Laporta launched a petition that sought to force Núñez's removal through a vote of no confidence. Cruyff, who still desired the coaching position, immediately publicly supported Laporta's petition and advised Laporta. Laporta aimed to dismiss van Gaal and reinstate Cruyff as coach if he were elected. Even though the vote of no confidence failed, Núñez resigned in 2000. His successor was Vice President Gaspart, with whom Cruyff had also been at odds since his dismissal. Gaspart's short tenure is generally characterised as unsuccessful; when he resigned in 2003, Joan Laporta ran for his successor, among other things, on the promise of renewing the club according to Cruyff's principles. Laporta's election led to a process of modernisation. Laporta used Cruyff's advice and stated publicly that all sporting decisions were first approved by Cruyff. At the same time, however, he never gave Cruyff an official position, which he explained years later by saying that Cruyff would have polarised everyone around him. Initially, Laporta appointed the staunch Cruyffian Txiki Begiristain as the new sporting director. In addition, on Cruyff's advice, Frank Rijkaard was hired as Barça's coach in 2003. Rijkaard, also a Cruyffian despite earlier disagreements, initially relied heavily on Cruyff and frequently consulted his advice. At his suggestion, Rijkaard changed the team's tactics from 4-2-3-1 to the classic 4-3-3 formation propagated by Cruyff. In 2007, Cruyff's favourite pupil, Pep Guardiola, took over as coach of Barcelona's B team. Guardiola also initially relied on Cruyff as an advisor; when he faced a revolt by two players right at the beginning, he asked Cruyff for advice, who advised him to get rid of both of them immediately.

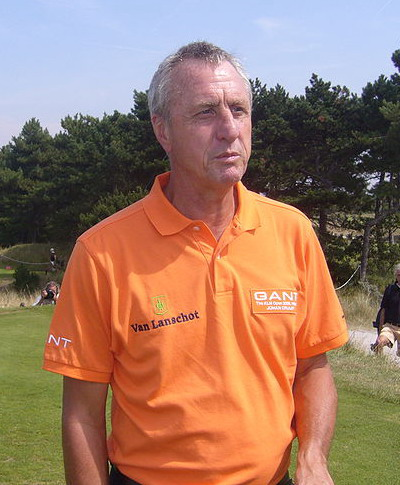
Cruyff in 2009

In the autumn of 2007, Barca slipped into a sporting crisis. Laporta asked Cruyff in December 2007 to return as coach for six months and train the team alongside Pep Guardiola as his assistant, before Guardiola would take over alone. Cruyff, who by then no longer felt any ambition for a coaching position and had settled in retirement, however, declined the offer and made it clear that, in his eyes, Guardiola was ready to lead the team and no longer needed him. In summer 2008, Rijkaard left the club and even though José Mourinho was pushing for the job at Camp Nou, Barca chose Pep Guardiola. Many were quick to point to Guardiola's lack of coaching experience, but Cruyff said: "The biggest test for a coach at a team like Barça is the strength to make decisions and the ability to talk to the press, because they don't help and you have to manage that. After that, it's easy for those who know football. But there aren't many who know."

With Guardiola, Cruyff's long-time favourite student took over the coaching position; Guardiola had been immensely influenced by Cruyff in his views on football and had already openly described himself as a "Cruyffian" in his 2001 autobiography. Under Guardiola's tenure, the identification of the club with Cruyff's ideas gained a new intensity. Sid Lowe characterises Guardiola's Barcelona as a kind of sect, which like a mantra constantly emphasised, in moralistic terms the all-encompassing priority of playing attractive football in a Cruyffian sense. FC Barcelona, in this respect, soon distinguished itself very strongly from other clubs such as Real Madrid in its identity but also in its moralistic language. For Sid Lowe, the very term 'philosophy' used in relation to the Cruyffian style is a disturbing expression of an ideological war that Guardiola and his leading players wanted to conduct. While Guardiola himself referred to his mentor Cruyff as "the most important person in the history of football" and in the following years repeatedly exalted him in partly religious analogies as the architect and founder of modern FC Barcelona ("Before he came we didn't have a cathedral of football in Barcelona, this beautiful church in Barcelona. We needed something new. And now it is something that has lasted. It was built by one man, by Johan Cruyff, stone by stone."), Xavi, a Cruyffian and long-time pillar in Barca's midfield, spoke several times about Barcelona "fighting for the soul of football." Cruyff, in turn, according to Xavi, is "the most influential person in the history of FC Barcelona."

On 26 March 2010, the outgoing president Joan Laporta announced the appointment of Cruyff as honorary president of the Catalan club in recognition of his contributions to the club as both a player and manager. In July 2010, however, he was stripped of this title by new president Sandro Rosell. Sandro Rosell was elected president of FC Barcelona as Laporta's successor; Cruyff had also long been at odds with Rosell. In July 2010, Rosell revoked Cruyff's appointment as honorary president, citing difficulties with the club's statutes, which did not provide for such a position. Instead, the club's members would first have to vote on the creation of the position and then on Cruyff's appointment. Cruyff called the procedure 'a circus,' ended his unofficial involvement, and resigned from the position of honorary president. After that, he focused on Ajax and Dutch football. He thereafter commented on Barca from an outside perspective, usually attributing any misdevelopments in the following years entirely to Rosell's management, while mostly defending the players and coaches. In 2011, he criticised the fact that FC Barcelona no longer respected previously valid principles. He sharply criticised the introduction of jersey sponsorship, saying that this neglected the local roots in Catalonia. When Luis Enrique, also a self-proclaimed Cruyffian, became Barca's coach in 2014, Barca played a more direct, faster game that quickly bridged the midfield to serve the attacking line (Messi, Suarez, Neymar) made up of dribbling individualists. With this, Barca won the treble of the league, Copa del Rey, and Champions League in mid-2015. Nevertheless, Cruyff, as an expert in a column in De Telegraaf, saw the new playing style of FC Barcelona as too star-oriented, which he regarded as a misdevelopment.

==== Netherlands: Revolution and Counter-Revolution ====
The classic 4–3–3 playing system

In 2002, the Dutch national team was unable to qualify for the World Cup finals in Japan and South Korea. The decisive qualifying match against Ireland, known in the Netherlands as Het Drama van Dublin ('The disaster of Dublin'), had strong repercussions. In the following years, Dutch football once again began to turn away from the idealistic Total Football ideology. The established philosophy was increasingly questioned critically and soon gave way to a more results-oriented style of play. The theoretical focal point of the discussions was the question of whether the classic 4-3-3 with a centre forward and two wingers should be maintained or whether one should adapt to the European mainstream and switch to the more defensive 4–4–2.

A main argument of the critics was that the ideal of Total Football was outdated and that – unlike in the golden 1970s and 1995 – the Netherlands no longer had the best players to continue offering a football that was both spectacular and successful. At the centre of the debates was inevitably again Cruyff, who steadfastly adhered to his philosophy of playing – the winner speaks of an ideology that had hardened into a dogma – and was ridiculed by his critics as an Ayatollah and a nagging Muppet grandpa.

In the Eredivisie, PSV Eindhoven successfully practiced the 4-4-2 under coach Guus Hiddink (and subsequently also under Ronald Koeman); other clubs also switched to 4–4–2. Cruyff, in turn, succeeded in installing his protégé and supporter Marco van Basten as coach of the national team. Van Basten stuck to the 4–3–3, even though he lacked the suitable players for it.

In contrast, Foppe de Haan (in his role as coach of the Dutch U-21 national team) announced in the summer of 2007 that he would switch to a 4-4-2 formation for the upcoming UEFA European Under-21 Championship. A furious Cruyff accused De Haan of damaging Dutch football with this decision. De Haan rejected the criticism and called the 4-3-3 outdated and difficult to play. With the tournament victory, De Haan managed to win over much of the press. Subsequently, Louis van Gaal at AZ Alkmaar, one of the last supporters of Cruyff's 4–3–3, also switched to a 4–4–2.

After Van Basten resigned following the 2008 European Football Championship, he took over the coaching position at Ajax – again with the help of Cruyff – but resigned already in 2009. Both for the national team (with Bert van Marwijk) and for Ajax (with Martin Jol), people who stood outside the tradition shaped by Michels and Cruyff and promoted a completely different playing style took over. The culmination was the appearance of the Dutch national team in the final of the World Cup in South Africa. The opponent (and later winner) Spain started with 6 players from Barca in the starting lineup and based its play heavily on the principles of the post-Cruyff style. Van Marwijk's team, in contrast, played purely defensively and destructively, which was also reflected in 7 yellow cards and the sending off of John Heitinga.

Cruyff vehemently criticised the performance of Oranje and expressed that although he would always remain Dutch, he had supported Spain in the final. He embarked on a series of devastating assessments. Oranje had played "ugly and vulgar", their style had been an "anti-football". After Ajax, coached by Martin Jol, had also been eliminated from the Champions League by Real Madrid in a similar manner, a point was reached for Cruyff at which he, in a formulation by Jonathan Wilson, began a crusade to turn Dutch football around in his sense. He started a public campaign that was quickly referred to as the "velvet revolution."

Writing in his column in De Telegraaf in November 2010, he called the Ajax team worse than all Ajax teams before 1965 and demanded the resignation of the board. In further columns, Cruyff called for a total restructuring of the club, accompanied by a complete replacement of the management. In further columns, Cruyff demanded a total restructuring of the club, accompanied by a complete replacement of the management. Together with Ruben Jongkind and Wim Jonk, he designed the Cruyff Plan, which envisaged an overhaul of the club from top to bottom. To achieve this, he initially targeted the members' council, which, to Cruyff's annoyance, was made up entirely of people with no football background. Cruyff wanted to fill the eight vacant seats of the 24 seats in the members' council with former Ajax players who shared his views. At the general meeting on 14 December 7 of these 8 players were elected. After that, Cruyff ran as a member for the supervisory board and presented his plan to bring Ajax back to the top, which in his view would be best achieved through the promotion of the youth academy and support programs abroad. Furthermore, Ajax should be led by former top footballers like Wim Jonk and Dennis Bergkamp, as he believed that only former footballers had the necessary qualifications for top positions in football clubs. His campaign was immediately supported by his followers and the influential newspaper De Telegraaf associated with him. Among the fans, Cruyff quickly found support as well; during home games at the Amsterdam ArenA, fan clubs held choreographies in the 14th minute as a sign of support for Cruyff.

In June 2011, Cruyff was elected to the five-member supervisory board. In the following nine months, Cruyff accepted no contradiction at all meetings, trying to impose his (personal) ideas on the other four members and tolerating no opposition. The only woman on the supervisory board, Marjan Olfers, was rebuked by him after a dispute, saying that she was on the board purely as a quota woman. Regarding Edgar Davids, who is from Suriname, he commented after a disagreement that Davids owed his place on the supervisory board solely to the fact that he was black. After criticism on social media, Cruyff denied any intention of a racist insult, but in terms of content, he stuck to his basic statement and saw himself as a victim of a campaign. In November 2011, the rift between Cruyff and the other members of the supervisory board had become practically unavoidable; he finally fell out with the other members after they, in his absence, installed Louis van Gaal as the new general director in a fait accompli, which was generally seen as a calculated move to provoke Cruyff. The outraged Cruyff then sued the remaining members of the supervisory board and the club's parent organisation, Ajax NV. The disputes and the subsequent legal battle received enormous media attention in the Netherlands and internationally. The court overturned the appointment, saying that the board had "deliberately put Cruyff offside". In February 2012, a court upheld his lawsuit and revoked van Gaal's appointment. Subsequently, the entire supervisory board (including Cruyff), the interim managing director Martin Sturkenboom, and the sporting director Danny Blind resigned, and a new supervisory board was elected.

With Cruyff in the background as a determining factor of power, the new supervisory board installed Ruben Jongkind and Wim Jonk in responsible positions in the youth academy according to Cruyff's ideas. Since he continued to live in Barcelona and did not use modern means of communication such as mobile phones and the internet, he was largely cut off from everyday life at Ajax and only inadequately informed, as well as involved only peripherally. The members of the supervisory board soon distanced themselves from the so-called Cruyff Program, which, in the assessment of Jonk and Jongkind, was implemented only selectively. After various internal disputes, Jonk and Jongkind resigned in 2015; Cruyff then severed his ties to the club and distanced himself publicly.

==== Technical advisor for Chivas Guadalajara ====
Cruyff became a technical advisor for Mexican club Guadalajara in February 2012. Jorge Vergara, the owner of the club, made him the team's sport consultant in response to the losing record Guadalajara sustained in the last few months of 2011. Although signed to a three-year contract, Cruyff's contract was terminated December 2012 after just nine months with the club. Guadalajara said that other members of the team's coaching staff would likely not be terminated.

=== TV expert and columnist ===
At the 1978 World Cup in Argentina, Cruyff worked as an analyst for the broadcaster ITV in London. Cruyff's vocabulary was limited, and in addition, the fast-speaking Cruyff often skipped important points in his explanations. As a result, it was often difficult to follow him. Nevertheless, after his return to the Netherlands in 1982, he received his own show on Dutch television, where he commented in a column-like manner on current football topics and described his ideas about the game to the viewers. In 1987, he took part in a TV documentary (Schijnbewegingen), in which he met Rudi van Dantzig, the artistic director of the Dutch National Ballet, and they both exchanged ideas about their professions.

Starting in 1994, he began producing spoken short film columns for Filmnet, a pay-TV channel. From 1996, Cruyff was a TV analyst for the Dutch broadcaster NOS during Champions League matches as well as World and European Championships. In 2009, he ended this activity, as the coverage by the broadcaster had, in his view, become too negative. In addition, he wrote a weekly column for the Dutch daily newspaper De Telegraaf (mostly authored by Jaap de Groot as a ghostwriter) and one for the influential magazine Voetbal International. From 2005 to 2007, he was a columnist for the Dutch football magazine Nummer 14; here, Bert Nederlof acted as his ghostwriter. In Spain, he wrote columns for El Periódico and later occasionally also for La Vanguardia. In his columns and as a TV expert, he defended his legacy and, according to David Winner, repeated the same message for years like a preacher: possession, willingness to take risks, use of wingers, dominance, and numerical superiority in midfield. He frequently referred to the 1974 World Cup and emphasised that although the Dutch team lost the final, it had nonetheless achieved a victory because it played football that the world still talks about. He also persistently and relentlessly criticised the defensive style of play in world football. As an expert, he criticised the defensive Italian style of play. In England, a tactical line would be practically unrecognisable.

Cruyff's analyses and columns were always characterised by a strong subjectivity; as biographer Kok notes, his personal friendships and feuds also always seemed to come through in his analysis. In 2005, he vehemently criticised José Mourinho in a column, who at Chelsea promoted a purely result-oriented defensive style, which, according to Cruyff, made him sick. Another preferred target of his criticism was his Dutch compatriot Leo Beenhakker, who as a coach at club level and in the national team always played an opposing model to Cruyff's ideology and publicly advocated placing success over attractiveness.

=== Ambassador for Belgium and the Netherlands joint bid to host the World Cup ===
In September 2009, Cruyff and Ruud Gullit were unveiled as ambassadors for the Belgium–Netherlands joint bid for the World Cup finals in 2018 or 2022 at the official launch in Eindhoven.

== Profile and legacy ==
=== Style of play: The total footballer ===
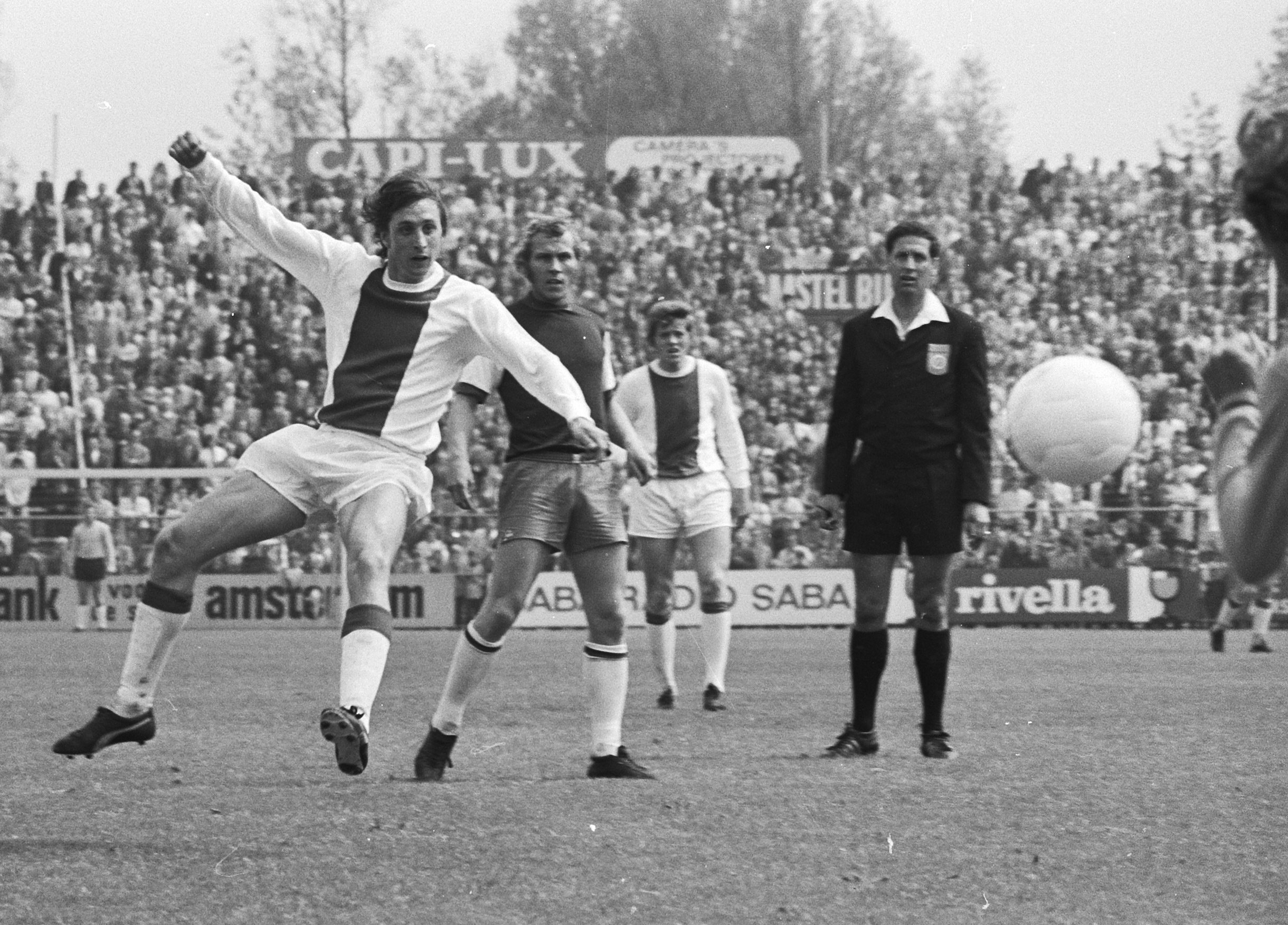
Cruyff playing with Ajax in 1971

Regarded as one of the greatest players in history and as the greatest Dutch footballer ever, throughout his career, Cruyff became synonymous with the playing style of "Total Football". It is a system where a player who moves out of his position is replaced by another from his team, thus allowing the team to retain their intended organizational structure. In this fluid system, no footballer is fixed in their intended outfield role. The style was honed by Ajax coach Rinus Michels, with Cruyff serving as the on-field "conductor".

Space and the creation of it were central to the concept of Total Football. Ajax defender Barry Hulshoff, who played with Cruyff, explained how the team that won the European Cup in 1971, 1972 and 1973 worked it to their advantage: "We discussed space the whole time. Cruyff always talked about where people should run, where they should stand, where they should not be moving. It was all about making space and coming into space. It is a kind of architecture on the field. We always talked about speed of ball, space and time. Where is the most space? Where is the player who has the most time? That is where we have to play the ball. Every player had to understand the whole geometry of the whole pitch and the system as a whole."

The team orchestrator, Cruyff was a creative playmaker with a gift for timing passes. Nominally, he played centre-forward in this system and was a prolific goalscorer, but dropped deep to confuse his markers or moved to the wing to great effect. Due to the way Cruyff played the game, he is still referred to as "the total footballer". Cruyff was known for his technical ability, speed, acceleration, dribbling and vision, possessing an awareness of his teammates' positions as an attack unfolded. "Football consists of different elements: technique, tactics and stamina", he told the journalists Henk van Dorp and Frits Barend, in one of the interviews collected in their book Ajax, Barcelona, Cruyff. "There are some people who might have better technique than me, and some may be fitter than me, but the main thing is tactics. With most players, tactics are missing. You can divide tactics into insight, trust and daring. In the tactical area, I think I just have more than most other players." On the concept of technique in football, Cruyff once said: "Technique is not being able to juggle a ball 1,000 times. Anyone can do that by practising. Then you can work in the circus. Technique is passing the ball with one touch, with the right speed, at the right foot of your team mate."

=== Style of management and tactics ===
Cruyff is widely seen as a revolutionary figure in the history of Ajax, Barcelona, and the Netherlands. The offensive style of play Cruyff introduced at Barcelona later came to be known as tiki-taka—characterised by short passing and movement, working the ball through various channels, and maintaining possession—which was later adopted by the Euro 2008, 2010 FIFA World Cup and Euro 2012 winning Spain national football team. As a manager, Cruyff's tactics were influenced by the Dutch total football system in which he played a part during his playing career under his former manager Michels. His favoured formations were fluid 3–4–3 and 4–3–3 systems, which he often used interchangeably throughout the course of a match depending on whether the team were attacking or defending. Uniquely, his 3–4–3 formation made use of a midfield diamond.

At Barcelona, Cruyff deployed Danish playmaker Michael Laudrup in a free centre-forward role, due to his mobility, positioning, passing, and tendency to be involved in the build-up of attacking plays and create chances for teammates; Laudrup would often drop deep into midfield, which would disorient opposing defenders, allowing other midfielders, or offensive wingers, such as Stoichkov, to exploit the space he created, and get into good attacking positions from which they could shoot on goal. This role has retroactively been likened by pundits to the modern "false 9" role, and has also been compared to Cruyff's own playing position. Cruyff did also use a genuine striker at times, in particular when Romário joined the club. Cruyff also used Pep Guardiola as the team's deep-lying playmaker in a holding midfield role, who would dictate play with his passing, and help the team control possession; when defending off the ball, he would also drop back into the back-line to help the defence. He would also occasionally drop deeper to act as an additional centre-back in Cruyff's fluid system.

Defensively, his teams made use of heavy pressing, a high defensive line, and the offside trap, and relied on the positioning of his players to recover the ball quickly, maintain possession, and reduce the possibility of facing opposing counter-attacks; as such, Cruyff's philosophy was based on defending by attacking, a view also echoed by Dietrich Schulze-Marmeling. He also used Sergi and Ferrer as inverted full-backs, who moved inside to occupy central areas of the pitch, flanking an offensive sweeper – usually Ronald Koeman – who could carry the ball, start attacks or switch the play from the back, while he also favoured goalkeepers who were comfortable with the ball at their feet, and equally capable of building plays with their passing. Despite Cruyff's reputation as one of the greatest managers of all time, former Milan and Italy manager Arrigo Sacchi was critical of Cruyff in 2011, however, due to the fact that he did not pay as much attention to the defensive aspect of the game as he did to the offensive side.

=== Named after Cruyff ===
- Johan Cruyff Shield (Johan Cruijff Schaal in Dutch), a football trophy in the Netherlands, also referred to as the Dutch Super Cup.
- Johan Cruyff Award or Dutch Football Talent of the Year (Dutch: Nederlands Voetbal Talent van het Jaar), the title has been awarded in the Netherlands since 1984 for footballers under 21. The award Dutch Football Talent of the Year was replaced by the Johan Cruyff Trophy (Johan Cruijff Prijs in Dutch) in 2003.
- 14282 Cruijff, the asteroid (minor planet) was named after Cruyff. The International Astronomical Union (IAU) officially ratified the naming of Cruijff on 23 September 2010.
- Johan Cruyff Institute, an educational institution, founded by Johan Cruyff, aimed at educating athletes, sport and business professionals in the field of sport management, sport marketing, football business, sponsorship and coaching through a network that currently has five Johan Cruyff Institute (postgraduate and executive education), three Johan Cruyff Academy (graduate education) and five Johan Cruyff College (vocational training).
- Cruyffista (mainly in Spain), a follower/supporter of Cruyff's views (principles) on football development philosophy and sports culture.
- Johan Cruyff Stadium (Estadi Johan Cruyff in Catalan), FC Barcelona's newly constructed stadium is named after Cruyff.
- Johan Cruyff Arena (Johan Cruijff Arena in Dutch), home stadium of Ajax and previously known as the Amsterdam ArenA.

== In popular culture ==
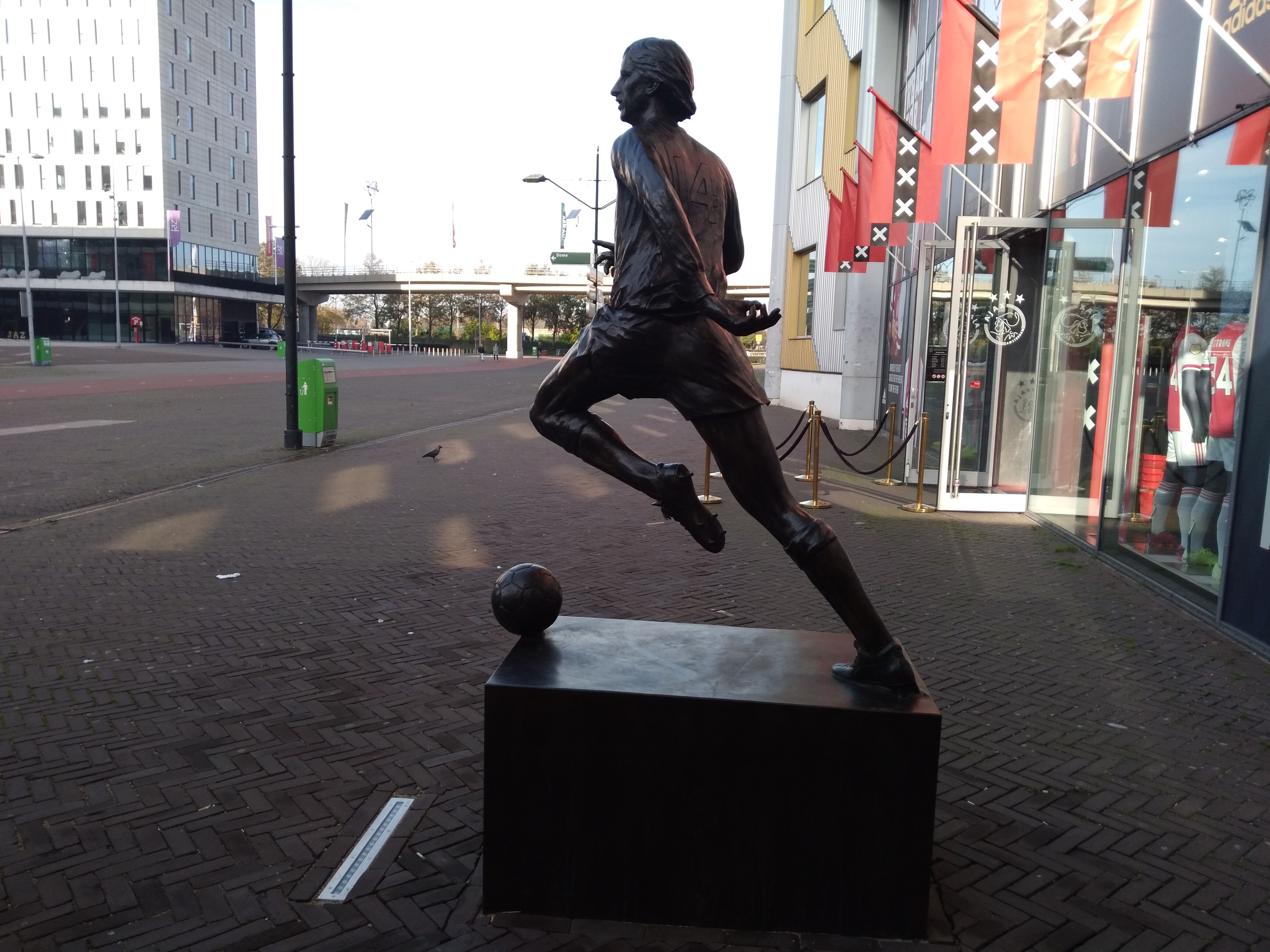
Cruyff's statue at the main entrance of the Johan Cruijff Arena in Amsterdam

In 1976, the Italian-language documentary film Il profeta del gol was directed by Sandro Ciotti. The documentary narrates the successes of Johan Cruyff's football career in the 1970s. In 2004, the documentary film Johan Cruijff – En un momento dado ("Johan Cruijff – At Any Given Moment") was made by Ramon Gieling and charts the years Cruyff spent at Barcelona, the club where he had the most profound effect in both a footballing and cultural sense. In 2014, the Catalan-language documentary film L'últim partit: 40 anys de Johan Cruyff a Catalunya was directed by Jordi Marcos, celebrating 40 years since Johan Cruyff signed for Barcelona in August 1973.

Cruyff had a small hit (number 21 in the charts) in the Netherlands with "Oei Oei Oei (Dat Was Me Weer Een Loei)". Upon arriving in Barcelona, the Spanish branch of Polydor decided to release the single in Spain as well, where it was rather popular. In 2004, a public poll in the Netherlands to determine the greatest Dutchman ("De Grootste Nederlander") named Cruyff the 6th-greatest Dutchman of all time, with Cruyff finishing above Rembrandt (9th) and Vincent van Gogh (10th). In 2010, the asteroid (minor planet) 14282 Cruijff (2097 P-L) was named after him. The International Astronomical Union (IAU) officially ratified the naming of Cruijff on 23 September 2010. After Josef Bican and Ferenc Puskás, Cruyff is the third football player to have an asteroid named after him.

== Philanthropy ==
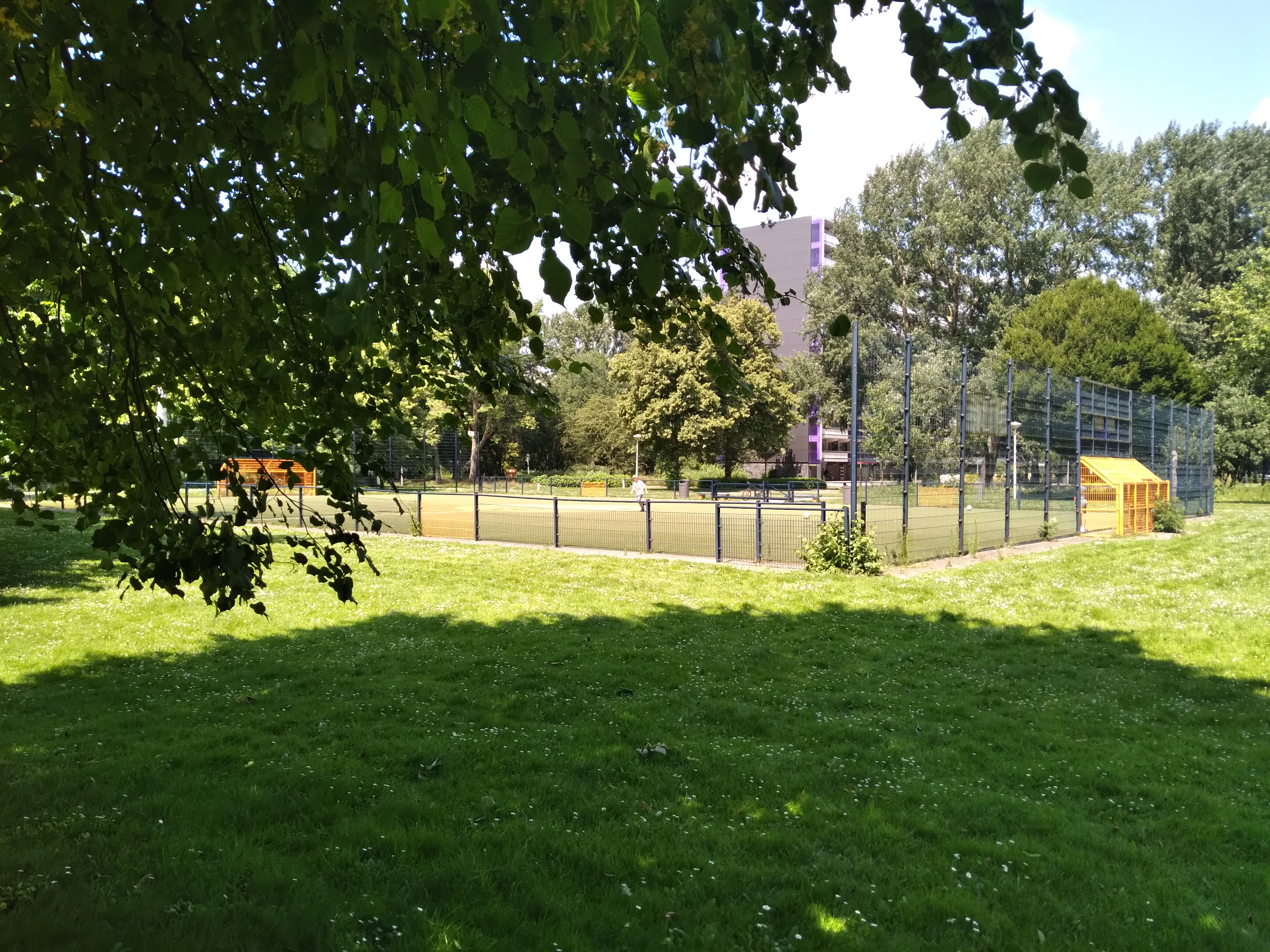
A Cruyff Court in Molenwijk, Amsterdam Noord. (2021)

In the spring of 1997, Cruyff founded the Johan Cruyff Foundation, which is intended to help disadvantaged children and those with special educational needs. He handed over organisational control to others. Apart from the usual sponsor meetings within the framework of the foundation, he was mainly occupied with spending time with children with Down syndrome. Additionally he founded the Johan Cruyff Academy in 1999, which was soon expanded under the umbrella organisation Johan Cruyff Institute and extended to several countries. As a programme for 35 athletes as part of the Johan Cruyff University of Amsterdam it has since become a global network and allowed thousands of former players to complete their school or vocational education.

Beginning in 2003, the Johan Cruyff Foundation has provided over 200 Cruyff Courts in 22 countries, including Israel, Malaysia, Japan, United States, and Mexico, for children of all backgrounds to play street football together. UEFA praised the foundation for its positive effect on young people, and Cruyff received the UEFA Grassroots Award on the opening of the 100th court in late 2009. Cruyff was also an ambassador of the Postcode Lottery Group, which establishes and manages charitable lotteries worldwide to raise funds for social organisations.

== Personal life ==
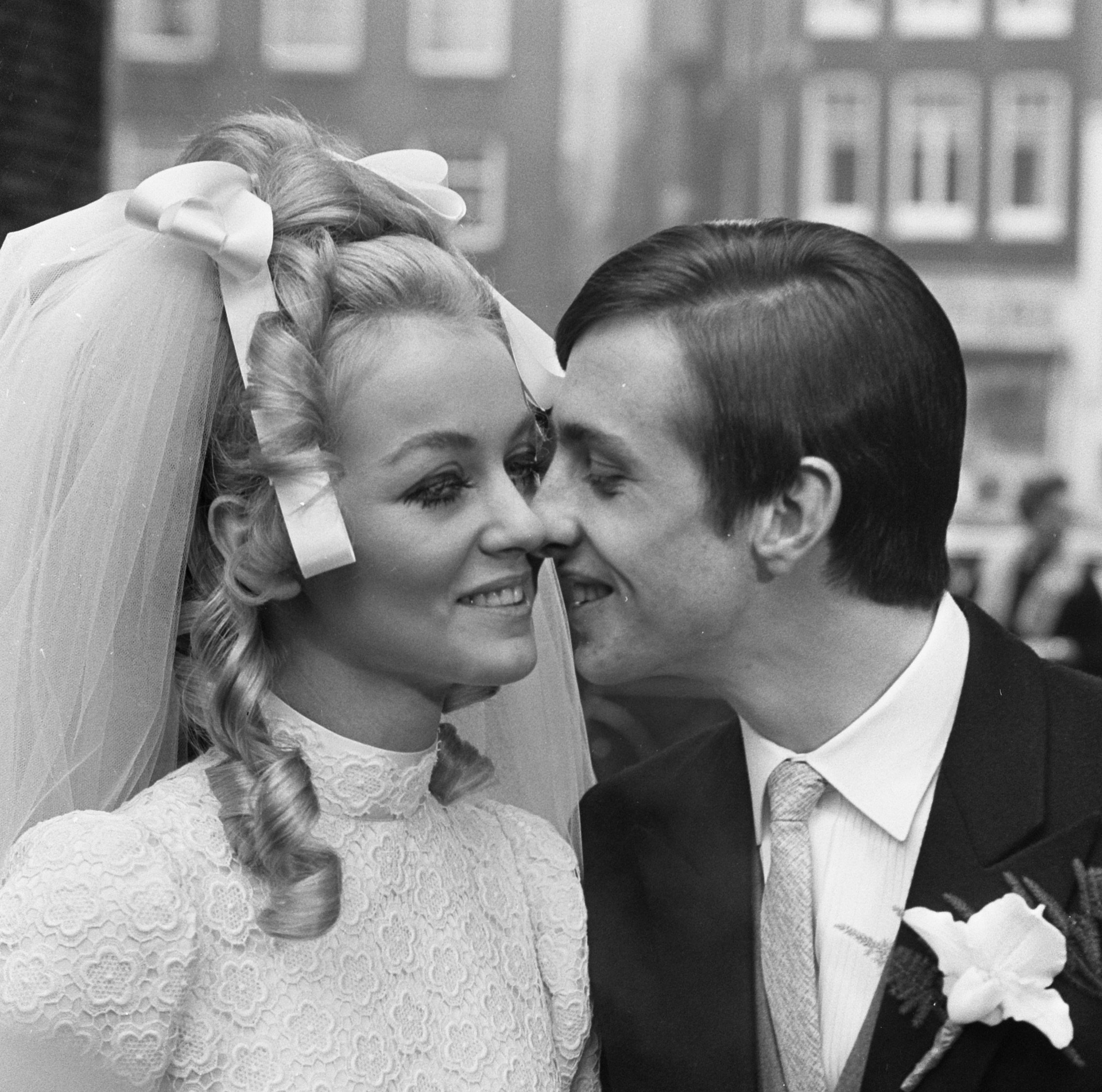
Cruyff and Danny Coster getting married on 2 December 1968

At the wedding of Ajax teammate Piet Keizer, on 13 June 1967, Cruyff met his future wife, Diana Margaretha "Danny" Coster (born 1949). They started dating, and on 2 December 1968, at the age of 21, he married Danny. Her father was Dutch businessman Cor Coster, who also happened to be Cruyff's agent. Cruyff's football career, both as a player and as a manager, was considerably influenced by his family, in particular his wife Danny. He and Danny had three children together: Chantal (16 November 1970), Susila (27 January 1972), and Jordi (9 February 1974). The family lived in Barcelona from 1973, with a six-year interruption from December 1981 to January 1988 when they lived in Vinkeveen.

== Quotes ==
Cruyff is the originator of several catchphrases and aphorisms that have entered everyday language, especially in the Netherlands and to some extent in Spain, where they have become proverbial. Several books of collected quotations have become bestsellers in the Netherlands. Biographer Nico Scheepmaker believes Cruyff exerted a universal fascination: even when he was talking nonsense, it was still interesting nonsense. Biographer Auke Kok, conversely, sees the complete absence of common clichés and Cruyff's originality as the reason for his enduring success. For Martin Nowak and Roger Highfield, Cruyff's one-liners oscillate somewhere between the brilliant and the banal.

- "Coincidence is logical."
- "Every disadvantage has its advantage."
- "If I wanted you to understand it, I would have explained it better."
- "I suspect, that if journalists really understood football they wouldn't be journalists."
- "Every trainer talks about movement, about running a lot. I say don't run so much. Football is a game you play with your brain."
- "Playing football is very simple but playing simple football is the hardest thing there is."
- "Winning is an important thing, but to have your own style, to have people copy you, to admire you, that is the greatest gift."
- "In my teams, the goalie is the first attacker, and the striker the first defender."

== Illness and death ==
He has enriched and personified our football. He was an icon of the Netherlands. Johan Cruijff belonged to all of us.

— King Willem-Alexander of the Netherlands pays tribute following Cruyff's death

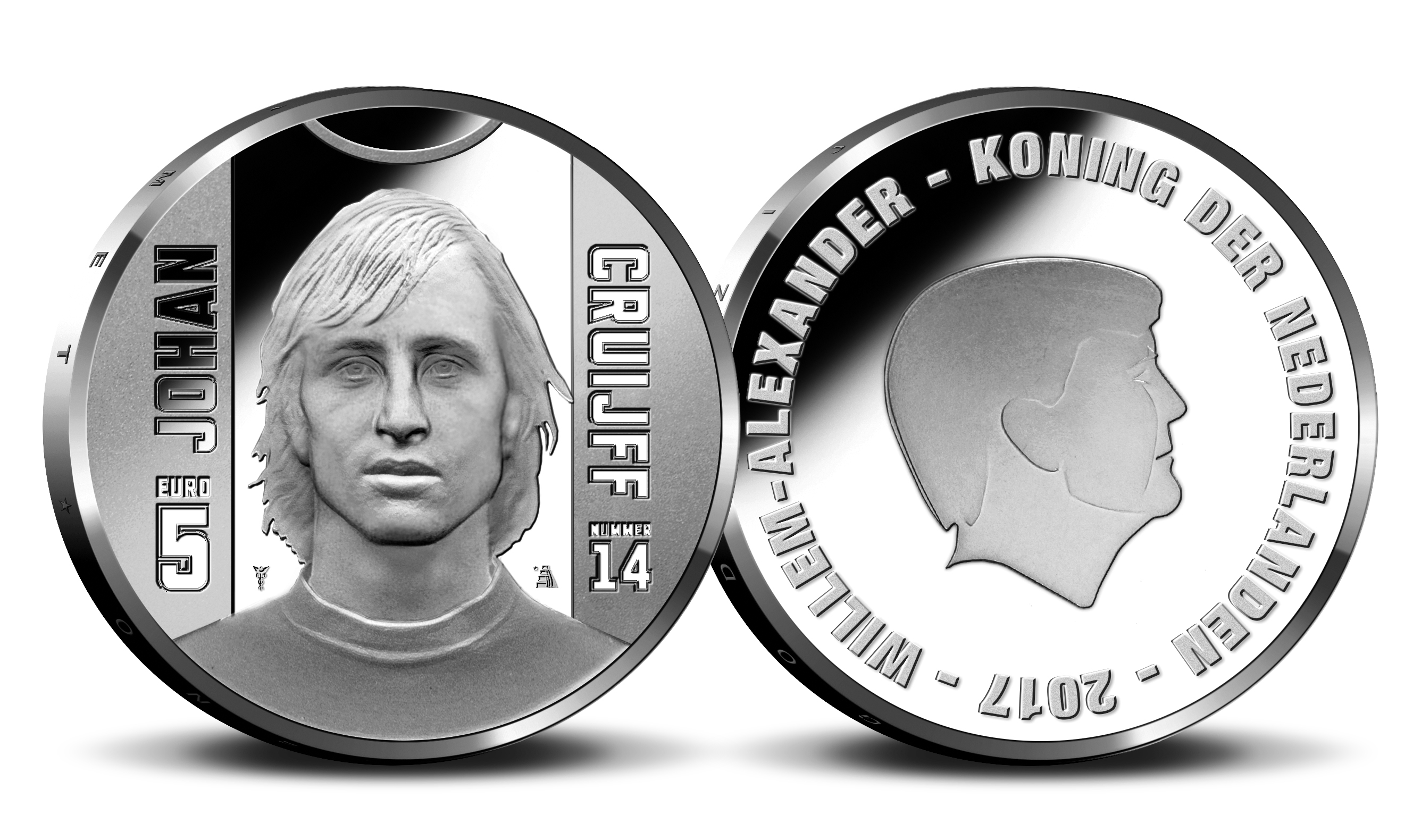
Euro coin, the Johan Cruijff Fiver issued in 2017, designed by Hennie Bouwe

Even as a teenager, Cruyff was a chain smoker (at times smoking 80 cigarettes a day) – a vice he continued into professional football and vehemently defended. He was even said to smoke during halftime breaks. In February 1991, he suffered a heart attack and had to undergo bypass surgery. Afterward, he quit smoking and participated in various anti-smoking campaigns; for example, he featured in a Catalan health department advertisement, and symbolically kicked away a cigarette pack.

In October 2015, it was revealed that Cruyff had been diagnosed with lung cancer. In February 2016, he announced that he felt as if he were leading 2–0 at halftime in his fight against cancer. However, by that time, the cancer had already spread from his lungs to his back and brain. Cruyff died on 24 March 2016, surrounded by his family. His ashes were scattered in the garden of his summer house in El Montanya.

== Memoirs ==
In 2016, Cruyff's posthumously autobiography My Turn was published, and he also ironically alludes to his legendary trick move. The book, co-written with his long-time ghostwriter Jaap de Groot, was generally met with a very critical reception. Simon Kuper, in a review in the Financial Times, summed it up as a "missed opportunity". He said it was "full of uninteresting banalities" and argued that the book showcased none of Cruyff's virtues but all his shortcomings and seemed to have been written primarily to settle old scores from his past disputes.

For NOS, the endless list of administrators and managers, both at Ajax and Barça, with whom Cruyff settled accounts in the book was also a major theme, although Cruyff was also portrayed as mild and understanding towards former associates like Marco van Basten. The figure of Rinus Michels also runs like a leitmotif through the book: first as a surrogate father, then as a confidant in football tactics, then as the man who may have denied him the coaching position at the 1990 World Cup out of jealousy. In an article for the Süddeutsche Zeitung, Javier Caceres viewed Cruyff's autobiography as a bland, uninspiring book. He described it as a settling of scores in many places, with few pearls of insight to be found. On German Deutschlandfunk radio, Thomas Jaedicke concluded after reading it that his childhood idol, Cruyff, had also been arrogant and a haughty egotist.

== Biographies ==
Dutch author Nico Scheepmaker published the first major biography of Johan Cruyff (Cruijff, Hendrik Johannes, fenomeen) in 1972; Scheepmaker's book was well received. In 2007, Marcel Rözer published a dual biography of Cruyff and Franz Beckenbauer, Beckenbauer & Cruijff: De Keizer en de Verlosser. Rözer saw significant overlaps and parallels between the two in their backgrounds, careers, and lives; both had become national heroes in their home countries and could even spout nonsense without facing any opposition.

In 2019, the Dutch author Auke Kok published a biography of Cruyff. The biography, a revisionist and critical examination of Cruyff, portrays him as an exceptional athlete but in his private life as someone who engaged in questionable business dealings; while a devoted family man, he was also a notorious womaniser for years, a fact he carefully shielded from the public eye. Also in 2019, Arthur van den Boogaard published the book Het laatste seizoen about Cruyff's final year at Feyenoord and a retrospective of his playing career. He saw Cruyff as a self-important man with an enormous need for recognition; at the same time, he asserted that in the Netherlands there was a "before Cruyff" and a "after Cruyff", which he likened, analogously to the passing of a Rembrandtian era in art. In 2021, Andy Bollen published the book Fierce Genius, in which he also blended a biography with a description of Cruyff's last year as a player for Feyenoord Rotterdam.

== Career statistics ==
=== Club ===
Appearances and goals by club, season and competition
Club	Season	League			National cup (Note: Appearances in KNVB Cup, Copa del Generalísimo/Copa del Rey)		Continental		Other		Total	
Club	Season	Division	Apps	Goals	Apps	Goals	Apps	Goals	Apps	Goals	Apps	Goals
Ajax	1964–65	Eredivisie	10	4	0	0	—		—		10	4
Ajax	1965–66	Eredivisie	19	16	4	9	—		—		23	25
Ajax	1966–67	Eredivisie	30	33	5	5	6 (Note: Appearances in European Cup)	3	—		41	41
Ajax	1967–68	Eredivisie	33	27	5	6	2	1	—		40	34
Ajax	1968–69	Eredivisie	29	24	3	3	10	6	1	1	43	34
Ajax	1969–70	Eredivisie	33	23	5	6	8 (Note: Appearances in Inter-Cities Fairs Cup)	4	—		46	33
Ajax	1970–71	Eredivisie	25	21	6	5	6	1	—		37	27
Ajax	1971–72	Eredivisie	32	25	4	3	9	5	—		45	33
Ajax	1972–73	Eredivisie	32	17	0	0	6	3	4 (Note: Two appearances and two goals in European Super Cup, two appearances and one goal in Intercontinental Cup)	3	42	23
Ajax	1973–74	Eredivisie	2	3	0	0	0	0	0	0	2	3
Ajax	Total		245	193	32	37	47	23	5	4	329	257
Barcelona	1973–74	La Liga	26	16	12	8	0	0	—		38	24
Barcelona	1974–75	La Liga	30	7	12	7	8	0	—		50	14
Barcelona	1975–76	La Liga	29	6	10	3	9 (Note: Appearances in UEFA Cup)	2	—		48	11
Barcelona	1976–77	La Liga	30	14	9	6	7	5	—		46	25
Barcelona	1977–78	La Liga	28	5	7	1	10	5	—		45	11
Barcelona	Total		143	48	50	25	34	12	—		227	85
Los Angeles Aztecs	1979	NASL	22	14	—		—		4	1	26	15
Washington Diplomats	1980	NASL	24	10	—		—		2	0	26	10
Levante	1980–81	Segunda División	10	2	0	0	—		—		10	2
Washington Diplomats	1981	NASL	5	2	—		—		—		5	2
Ajax	1981–82	Eredivisie	15	7	1	0	0	0	—		16	7
Ajax	1982–83	Eredivisie	21	7	7	2	2	0	—		30	9
Ajax	Total		36	14	8	2	2	0	—		46	16
Feyenoord	1983–84	Eredivisie	33	11	7	1	4	1	—		44	13
Career total			518	294	97	65	87	36	11	5	713	400

=== International ===
Appearances and goals by national team and year
National team	Year	Apps	Goals
Netherlands	1966	2	1
Netherlands	1967	3	1
Netherlands	1968	1	0
Netherlands	1969	3	1
Netherlands	1970	2	2
Netherlands	1971	4	6
Netherlands	1972	5	5
Netherlands	1973	6	6
Netherlands	1974	12	8
Netherlands	1975	2	0
Netherlands	1976	4	2
Netherlands	1977	4	1
Total		48	33

Scores and results list the Netherlands' goal tally first, score column indicates score after each Cruyff goal.

List of international goals scored by Johan Cruyff
No.	Date	Venue	Opponent	Score	Result	Competition
1	7 September 1966	Rotterdam, Netherlands	Hungary	2–0	2–2	UEFA Euro 1968 qualifying
2	13 September 1967	Amsterdam, Netherlands	East Germany	1–0	1–0	UEFA Euro 1968 qualifying
3	26 March 1969	Rotterdam, Netherlands	Luxembourg	1–0	4–0	1970 FIFA World Cup qualification
4	2 December 1970	Amsterdam, Netherlands	Romania	1–0	2–0	Friendly
5	2 December 1970	Amsterdam, Netherlands	Romania	2–0	2–0	Friendly
6	24 February 1971	Rotterdam, Netherlands	Luxembourg	3–0	6–0	UEFA Euro 1972 qualifying
7	24 February 1971	Rotterdam, Netherlands	Luxembourg	4–0	6–0	UEFA Euro 1972 qualifying
8	17 November 1971	Eindhoven, Netherlands	Luxembourg	1–0	8–0	UEFA Euro 1972 qualifying
9	17 November 1971	Eindhoven, Netherlands	Luxembourg	7–0	8–0	UEFA Euro 1972 qualifying
10	17 November 1971	Eindhoven, Netherlands	Luxembourg	8–0	8–0	UEFA Euro 1972 qualifying
11	1 December 1971	Amsterdam, Netherlands	Scotland	1–0	2–1	Friendly
12	16 February 1972	Athens, Greece	Greece	3–0	5–0	Friendly
13	16 February 1972	Athens, Greece	Greece	5–0	5–0	Friendly
14	30 August 1972	Prague, Czechoslovakia	Czechoslovakia	1–0	2–1	Friendly
15	1 November 1972	Rotterdam, Netherlands	Norway	4–0	9–0	1974 FIFA World Cup qualification
16	1 November 1972	Rotterdam, Netherlands	Norway	8–0	9–0	1974 FIFA World Cup qualification
17	2 May 1973	Amsterdam, Netherlands	Spain	3–2	3–2	Friendly
18	22 August 1973	Amsterdam, Netherlands	Iceland	2–0	5–0	1974 FIFA World Cup qualification
19	22 August 1973	Amsterdam, Netherlands	Iceland	5–0	5–0	1974 FIFA World Cup qualification
20	29 August 1973	Deventer, Netherlands	Iceland	2–0	8–1	1974 FIFA World Cup qualification
21	29 August 1973	Deventer, Netherlands	Iceland	4–0	8–1	1974 FIFA World Cup qualification
22	12 September 1973	Oslo, Norway	Norway	1–0	2–1	1974 FIFA World Cup qualification
23	26 June 1974	Gelsenkirchen, West Germany	Argentina	1–0	4–0	1974 FIFA World Cup
24	26 June 1974	Gelsenkirchen, West Germany	Argentina	4–0	4–0	1974 FIFA World Cup
25	3 July 1974	Dortmund, Germany	Brazil	2–0	2–0	1974 FIFA World Cup
26	4 September 1974	Stockholm, Sweden	Sweden	1–0	5–1	Friendly
27	25 September 1974	Helsinki, Finland	Finland	1–1	3–1	UEFA Euro 1976 qualifying
28	25 September 1974	Helsinki, Finland	Finland	2–1	3–1	UEFA Euro 1976 qualifying
29	20 November 1974	Rotterdam, Netherlands	Italy	2–1	3–1	UEFA Euro 1976 qualifying
30	20 November 1974	Rotterdam, Netherlands	Italy	3–1	3–1	UEFA Euro 1976 qualifying
31	22 May 1976	Brussels, Belgium	Belgium	2–1	2–1	UEFA Euro 1976 qualifying
32	13 October 1976	Rotterdam, Netherlands	Northern Ireland	2–1	2–2	1978 FIFA World Cup qualification
33	26 March 1977	Antwerp, Belgium	Belgium	2–0	2–0	1978 FIFA World Cup qualification

== Managerial statistics ==
Team	From	To	Record				
Team	From	To	G	W	D	L	Win %
Ajax	6 June 1985	4 January 1988	117	86	10	21	73.50
Barcelona	4 May 1988	18 May 1996	430	250	97	83	58.14
Catalonia	2 November 2009	2 January 2013	4	2	2	0	50.00
Total			551	338	109	104	61.34

== Honours ==
=== Player ===
Ajax

- Eredivisie: 1965–66, 1966–67, 1967–68, 1969–70, 1971–72, 1972–73, 1981–82, 1982–83
- KNVB Cup: 1966–67, 1969–70, 1970–71, 1971–72, 1982–83
- European Cup: 1970–71, 1971–72, 1972–73
- European Super Cup: 1972
- Intercontinental Cup: 1972

Barcelona

- La Liga: 1973–74
- Copa del Rey: 1977–78

Feyenoord

- Eredivisie: 1983–84
- KNVB Cup: 1983–84

Netherlands

- FIFA World Cup Runner-up: 1974
- UEFA European Championship Third place: 1976
- Tournoi de Paris: 1978

=== Manager ===
Ajax

- KNVB Cup: 1985–86, 1986–87
- European Cup Winners' Cup: 1986–87

Barcelona

- La Liga: 1990–91, 1991–92, 1992–93, 1993–94
- Copa del Rey: 1989–90
- Supercopa de España: 1991, 1992, 1994
- European Cup: 1991–92
- European Cup Winners' Cup: 1988–89
- European Super Cup: 1992

=== Individual ===
Player

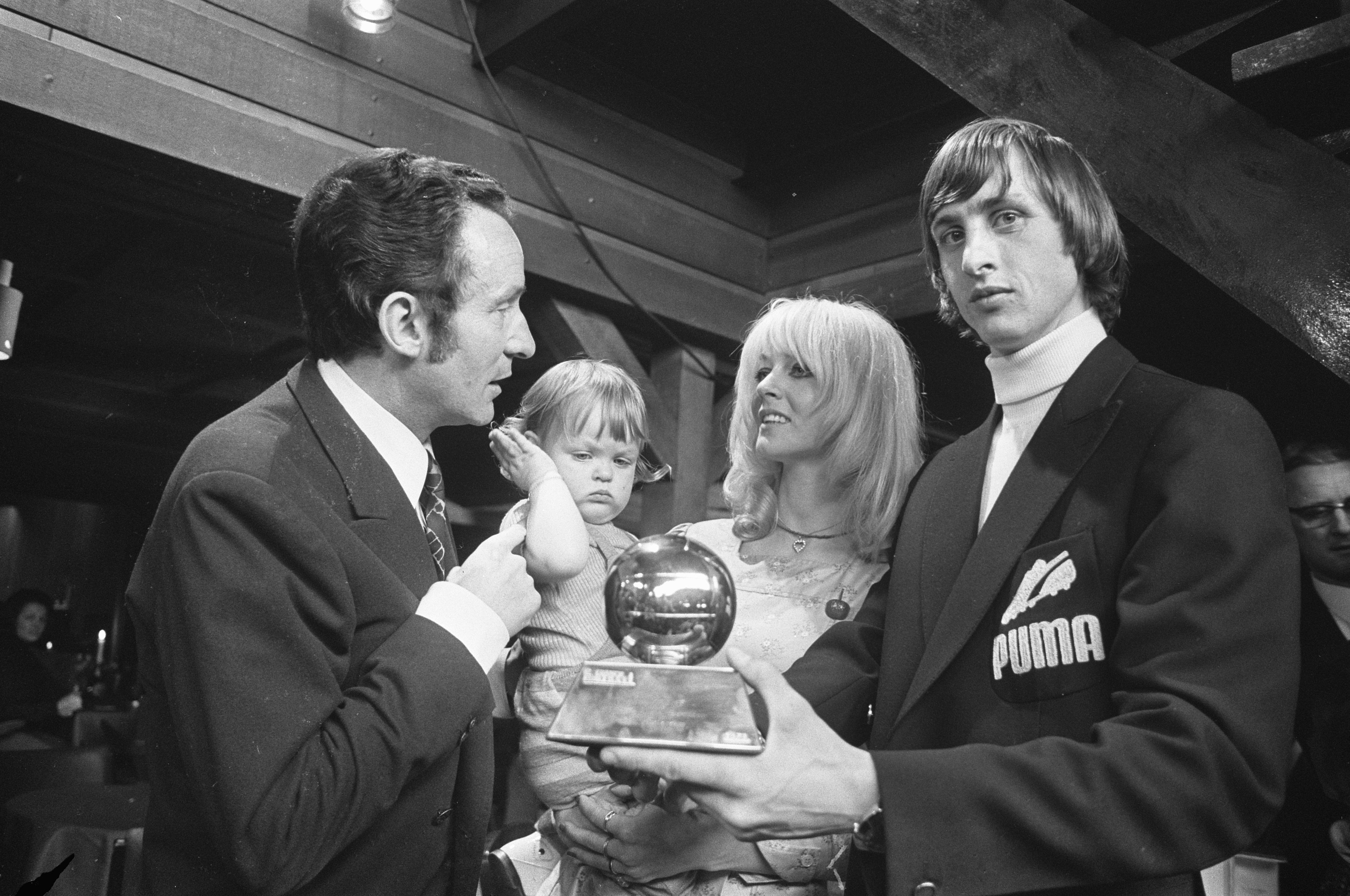
Cruyff receiving the 1971 Ballon d'Or

- Super Ballon d'Or Second place: 1989
- Ballon d'Or: 1971, 1973, 1974; Third place: 1975
- Eredivisie top scorer: 1966–67, 1971–72
- KNVB Cup top scorer: 1966–67, 1967–68, 1969–70, 1970–71, 1971–72
- European Cup top scorer: 1971–72
- Dutch Footballer of the Year: 1968, 1972, 1984
- Dutch Sportsman of the Year: 1973, 1974
- FIFA World Cup Golden Ball: 1974
- FIFA World Cup All-Star Team: 1974
- Sport Ideal European XI: 1971, 1972, 1973, 1974, 1975, 1976, 1977
- FUWO European Team of the Season: 1972
- World XI: 1972, 1977
- Onze de Onze: 1977
- Don Balón Award for Best LaLiga Foreign Player: 1977, 1978
- North American Soccer League MVP: 1979
- FIFA World Cup All-Time Team: 1994
- FIFA World Cup Dream Team: 2002
- World Team of the 20th Century
- FIFA 100: 2004
- AFS Top-100 Players of All-Time: #21 (2007)
- World Soccer's Greatest XI of All Time: 2013
- World Soccer's The Greatest Players of the 20th Century: #3
- France Football's Player of the Century: #3
- IFFHS European Player of the Century: #1
- IFFHS World Player of the Century: #2
- UEFA Golden Jubilee Poll (2004): #3
- IFFHS The Best European Player (1956–1990): #3
- Ballon d'Or Dream Team (Silver): 2020
- 11 Leyendas Jornal AS: 2021
- IFFHS All-time Men's Dream Team: 2021
- IFFHS World's Best Man Player of All Time: #9 (2025)

Manager

- World Soccer Awards Manager of the Year: 1987
- Don Balón Award for Coach of the Year: 1991, 1992
- Onze d'Or for Coach of the Year: 1991, 1992
- El País Manager of the Year: 1992, 1993, 1994
- World Soccer Greatest Manager of All Time: #28 (2013)
- France Football Greatest Manager of All Time: #4 (2019)
- Sports Illustrated Greatest Manager of All Time: #5 (2019)

Sportsperson

- Placar Magazine Most Genius in History of Football (2nd place): 2013

=== Orders and further honours ===
- In 1974, Cruyff was appointed Knight of the Order of Orange-Nassau.
- In 2002, Cruyff was promoted to Officer of the Order of Orange-Nassau.
- In November 2003, to celebrate UEFA's Jubilee, he was selected as the Golden Player of the Netherlands by the KNVB as their most outstanding player of the past 50 years.
- On 22 May 2006, Cruyff was presented a Lifetime Achievement Award for his contribution to football by Laureus in their annual World Sports Awards.
- In April 2016, Cruyff was posthumously awarded the Laureus Spirit of Sport Award, which was accepted by his son Jordi.
- Cruyff received a lifetime achievement award from the KNVB in August 2006.
- On 18 April 2007, Ajax decided to retire the number 14 shirt in honour of Cruyff and in celebration of his birthday.
- In 2010, Cruyff was presented the FIFA Order of Merit (highest honour awarded by FIFA) for his contribution to football.
- In 2010, Cruyff entered in the FICTS "Hall of Fame" and was awarded with "Excellence Guirlande D'Honneur".
- In 2013, Cruyff was recognised with the UEFA President's Award
- On 29 March 2016, the Prime Minister of Spain awarded Cruyff with the Gold Medal of the Royal Order of Sporting Merit.
- Cruyff posthumously received the Rinus Michels Lifetime Achievement Award (Rinus Michels Oeuvreprijs) in 2016, which was accepted by friend and former teammate Wim Jansen.
- On 25 October 2017, the Amsterdam Arena was renamed Johan Cruyff Arena.

== See also ==
- List of European Cup and UEFA Champions League winning managers
- List of UEFA club competition winning managers

== Movies, documentations and music ==
- de Vos, Maarten (1973). Nummer 14 Johan Cruijff (Motion picture) (in Dutch). Universal Pictures.
- Erkelens, Piet; Marks, Pim (1988). Schijnbewegingen. Over Foetbal En Dans (Television broadcast) (in Dutch). NOS.
- Biereichel, Wolfgang (2004). Der Triumph von München (Television broadcast) (in German). NDR.

== Publications ==
- Cruyff, Johan (2017). My Turn. London: Macmillan. ISBN 978-1509813926.

== Literature ==
=== Biographies ===
- Bollen, Andy (2021). Fierce Genius. Cruyff’s Year at Feyenoord. London: Pitch Publishing Ltd. ISBN 978-1-78531-824-5.
- van den Boogaard, Arthur (2021). Het laatste seizoen (in Dutch). Amsterdam: Thomas Rap. ISBN 978-94-004-0811-1.
- Ghemmour, Chérif (2015). Johan Cruyff, génie pop et despote (in French). Paris: éditions Hugo Sport. ISBN 978-2-7556-1894-5.
- Kok, Auke (2022). Johan Cruyff. Always on the Attack. London: Simon & Schuster. ISBN 978-1-398-50167-6.
- Kuper, Simon (2022). Barca: The Rise and Fall of the Club that Built Modern Football. Octopus Books.
- Rözer, Marcel (2007). Beckenbauer & Cruijff: De Keizer en de Verlosser (in Dutch). Antwerpen: Houtekiet. ISBN 978-9-052-40909-2.
- Scheepmaker, Nico (2016) [1972]. Cruijff, Hendrik Johannes, fenomeen 1947–1984 (in Dutch). Amsterdam: Singel Uitgeverijen. ISBN 978-9-03880-246-6.

=== Other ===
- Kuper, Simon (2023). Barça. Aufstieg und Fall des Klubs, der den modernen Fußball erfand (in German). Hamburg: Edel Verlagsgruppe. ISBN 978-3-9858804-5-4.
- Lowe, Sid (2013). Fear and Loathing in La Liga. Barcelona vs Real Madrid. London: Yellow Jersey Press. ISBN 978-0-224-09180-0.
- O’Connell, Dylan (2024). The Ajax Way: How One Football Club Defines the Modern Game. Chichester: Pitch Publishing. ISBN 978-1-80150-705-9.
- Schulze-Marmeling, Dietrich (2010). Barça oder: Die Kunst des schönen Spiels (in German). Göttingen: Die Werkstatt. ISBN 978-3-89533-720-8.
- Schulze-Marmeling, Dietrich (2012). Der König und sein Spiel. Johan Cruyff und der Weltfußball (in German). Göttingen: Die Werkstatt. ISBN 978-3-89533-845-8.
- Wilson, Jonathan (2018). The Barcelona Legacy: The Evolution of Winning Soccer Tactics from Cruyff to Guardiola. London: Blink Publishing. ISBN 978-1-56858-853-7.
- Winner, David (2008). Oranje brillant, das neurotische Genie des holländischen Fußballs (in German). Köln: Kiepenheuer & Witsch. ISBN 978-3-462-03994-8.

=== Monographs ===
- Scragg, Steven (11 October 2019). "The church that Cruyff built". The Athletic / The New York Times.

== Notes ==
Awards and achievements
Preceded by Ljupko Petrović	European Cup Winning Coach; 1991–92	Succeeded by Raymond Goethals
Preceded by Ard Schenk	Dutch Sportsman of the Year; 1973–1974	Succeeded by Jos Hermens
