= List of men's national association football teams =

This is a list of the men's national association football teams in the world. The Fédération Internationale de Football Association (FIFA) is the world's most important governing body for association football. A majority of national association football teams in the world are members of FIFA or one of its affiliated continental confederations. A majority of them also represent sovereign states with wide international recognition, with 188 of 195 United Nations (UN) member and observer states holding membership of FIFA. A notable exception is the United Kingdom, which is not a member of FIFA in its own right but is represented in the governing body by the teams of its four constituent countries. Other UN members and one observer state have either held membership in a confederation in the past and subsequently lost it, or have never belonged to either FIFA or one of its recognised confederations.

Membership of FIFA and its confederations also includes national teams representing a few states with limited international recognition, one associated state with no UN membership, a significant number of dependent territories, and a limited number of autonomous areas. A majority of states with limited recognition, however, have no membership of FIFA or any of its confederations.

This list divides national teams into three main groups:

- Teams that are either members of FIFA (211 teams), or have membership in a FIFA-affiliated continental confederation without being members of FIFA itself (11 teams).
- Teams that are not members of FIFA or any continental federation, but which represent UN member and observer states. This group includes five United Nations member states and one observer state (6 teams).
- Teams representing states with limited international recognition and no membership of FIFA or a confederation (6 teams), plus one representing an associated state with no membership of FIFA or a confederation.

This list excludes other teams described by their supporters as 'national', which represent specific ethnic groups, cultural/historical regions, separatist or autonomist movements, speakers of specific languages, and micronations. These teams have historically participated in matches and tournaments outside FIFA's recognition, though some of them have sporadically or regularly played in friendly matches and tournaments against FIFA members.

Some national teams with FIFA membership have disappeared due to belonging to a sovereign state or dependent territory which split into two or more states or territories (examples include the Soviet Union, Yugoslavia, or the Netherlands Antilles), or by part of the territory becoming independent (such as the Ireland national football team, which ceased to exist as such after reaching a compromise with FIFA and recognising the Republic of Ireland national football team as representative of the independent part of Ireland). Other teams have disappeared by virtue of the states or territories they represented forming a new state by joining another entity or entities (examples include the teams representing Tanganyika and Malaya, which merged with other former colonies to respectively form the Tanzania and Malaysia football teams), or becoming part of an already existing state (as is the case with East Germany, which joined West Germany to form the unified Germany football team). In several cases the football records of dissolved teams are considered by FIFA as belonging to a successor entity (the Russia national team, for example, carries over the records of the Soviet Union national team). Defunct teams are listed on this page for historical purposes.

Even if only members of FIFA and its affiliated confederations are taken into account, there are more national association football teams in the world than those of any other sport.

== Members of FIFA affiliated confederations ==
Map of the World with the six confederations: Asian Football Confederation (AFC) Confederation of African Football (CAF) Confederation of North, Central America and Caribbean Association Football (CONCACAF) South American Football Confederation (CONMEBOL) Oceania Football Confederation (OFC) Union of European Football Associations (UEFA)

This section lists the current:

- 211 men's national football teams affiliated to FIFA, through their national football associations.
- 11 men's national football teams who have membership in one of FIFA's affiliated continental confederations, but are not members of FIFA.

FIFA members are eligible to enter the FIFA World Cup and matches between them are recognised as official international matches. Based on their match results over the previous four-year period, the FIFA Men's World Rankings, published monthly by FIFA, compare the relative strengths of the national teams.

Some national teams that are members of a confederation but not FIFA members compete in confederation-level and subregional tournaments. These teams, however, are not allowed to participate in the World Cup.

The six confederations are:

- Asia – Asian Football Confederation (AFC) (Note: Additionally, 22 nations in Africa and Asia belong to the Union of Arab Football Associations (UAFA) in addition to their respective regional confederations.)
- Africa – Confederation of African Football (CAF)
- North and Central America and the Caribbean – Confederation of North, Central America and Caribbean Association Football (CONCACAF)
- South America – South American Football Confederation (CONMEBOL)
- Oceania – Oceania Football Confederation (OFC)
- Europe – Union of European Football Associations (UEFA)

FIFA runs the World Cup as a tournament for national teams to find the world champion. Each confederation also runs its own championship to find the best team from among its members:

- AFC – AFC Asian Cup
- CAF – Africa Cup of Nations
- CONCACAF – CONCACAF Gold Cup
- CONMEBOL – Copa América
- OFC – OFC Men's Nations Cup
- UEFA – UEFA European Football Championship

The Union of Arab Football Associations (UAFA) organises competitions between Arab League member nations. All 22 national governing bodies that form UAFA are also members of both FIFA and either the AFC or CAF. National teams from UAFA member countries are noted in the list below. The Arab Cup is the top championship tournament for national teams, organised historically by UAFA and by FIFA since 2021.

The Confederation of Independent Football Associations (ConIFA) is an organisation for teams representing unrecognised states, subnational regions, and stateless minorities, as well as teams from recognised states that have not managed to gain entry into FIFA. ConIFA is a successor to the Nouvelle Fédération-Board (N.F.-Board), which also organised tournaments for non-FIFA member teams. While none of the current ConIFA members are also members of FIFA, a few former members simultaneously held associate membership in one of the confederations affiliated with it. These teams are also noted in the list below. The ConIFA World Football Cup is the top tournament for ConIFA member nations.

=== AFC (Asia) ===
Due to the geographical size of Asia, the AFC, which comprises 47 member associations, is subdivided into five sub-federations:

- West Asian Football Federation (WAFF) – represents countries at the western extremity of the continent, except Israel.
- East Asian Football Federation (EAFF) – represents nations in East Asia, plus Guam and the Northern Mariana Islands.
- Central Asian Football Association (CAFA) – represents countries in Central Asia, comprising Afghanistan, Iran and most of Central Asia, except Kazakhstan.
- South Asian Football Federation (SAFF) – represents countries in South Asia.
- ASEAN Football Federation (AFF) – represents countries in Southeast Asia, plus Australia.

- Afghanistan
- Australia^{1¥}
- Bahrain^{2}
- Bangladesh
- Bhutan
- Brunei Darussalam
- Cambodia
- China PR^{3}
- Chinese Taipei^{4}
- Guam
- Hong Kong, China^{5}
- India
- Indonesia
- Iraq^{2¥}
- IR Iran^{6¥}
- Japan^{¥}
- Jordan^{2}
- Korea DPR^{7}
- Korea Republic^{8¥}
- Kuwait^{2¥}
- Kyrgyz Republic^{9}
- Laos
- Lebanon^{2}
- Macau
- Malaysia
- Maldives
- Mongolia
- Myanmar
- Nepal
- Northern Mariana Islands^{10,11}
- Oman^{2}
- Pakistan
- Palestine^{2}
- Philippines
- Qatar^{2¥}
- Saudi Arabia^{2¥}
- Singapore
- Sri Lanka
- Syria^{2}
- Tajikistan
- Thailand
- Timor-Leste
- Turkmenistan
- United Arab Emirates^{2}
- Uzbekistan
- Vietnam
- Yemen^{2}

1. National governing body was formerly a member of OFC (1966–2006)
2. National governing body is a member of UAFA
3. Official name used by FIFA and AFC for People's Republic of China
4. Official name used by FIFA and AFC for Republic of China (Taiwan); national governing body was a member of OFC from 1975 to 1989
5. Official name used by FIFA and AFC for Hong Kong
6. Official name used by FIFA and AFC for Islamic Republic of Iran
7. Official name used by FIFA for Democratic People's Republic of Korea; official name used by AFC is DPR Korea
8. Official name used by FIFA and AFC for Republic of Korea
9. Official name used by FIFA and AFC for Kyrgyzstan
10. National governing body is a full member of AFC but not a FIFA member
11. National governing body was formerly a member of OFC (2005–2009)

¥ AFC Asian Cup winner

=== CAF (Africa) ===
Due to the geographical size of Africa, CAF, which comprises 54 member associations, is divided into five regional federations:

- Council for East and Central Africa Football Associations (CECAFA) – represents nations generally regarded as forming the regions of East Africa and some nations of Central Africa.
- Council of Southern Africa Football Associations (COSAFA) – represents nations generally regarded as forming Southern Africa, as well as island states off the coast of Southern Africa.
- West African Football Union (WAFU/UFOA) – represents nations in West Africa.
- Union of North African Federations (UNAF) – represents nations regarded as forming North Africa.
- Central African Football Federations' Union (UNIFFAC) – represents some of the nations that form Central Africa.

- Algeria^{1₳}
- Angola
- Benin
- Botswana
- Burkina Faso
- Burundi
- Cabo Verde
- Cameroon^{₳}
- Central African Republic
- Chad
- Comoros^{1}
- Congo^{₳}
- Congo DR^{2₳}
- Côte d'Ivoire^{₳}
- Djibouti^{1}
- Egypt^{1₳}
- Equatorial Guinea
- Eritrea
- Eswatini
- Ethiopia^{₳}
- Gabon
- The Gambia
- Ghana^{₳}
- Guinea
- Guinea-Bissau
- Kenya
- Lesotho
- Liberia
- Libya^{1}
- Madagascar
- Malawi
- Mali
- Mauritania^{1}
- Mauritius
- Morocco^{1₳}
- Mozambique
- Namibia
- Niger
- Nigeria^{₳}
- Réunion^{3}
- Rwanda
- São Tomé and Príncipe
- Senegal
- Seychelles
- Sierra Leone
- Somalia^{1}
- South Africa^{₳}
- South Sudan
- Sudan^{1₳}
- Tanzania
- Togo
- Tunisia^{1₳}
- Uganda
- Zambia^{₳}
- Zanzibar^{3,4,5}
- Zimbabwe

1. National governing body is a member of UAFA
2. Official name used by FIFA for Democratic Republic of the Congo; official name used by CAF is DR Congo
3. National governing body is an associate member of CAF but not a FIFA member
4. National governing body was a full member of CAF briefly during 2017
5. National governing body was previously a member of the N.F.-Board and ConIFA

₳. African Cup of Nations winners

=== CONCACAF (North America) ===
The CONCACAF federation, which comprises 41 member associations, is divided into three regional federations that have responsibility for part of the region's geographical area:

- Caribbean Football Union (CFU) – represents all 27 nations in the Caribbean, plus Bermuda and three nations in South America. (Note: Guyana and Suriname are independent countries, and French Guiana is an overseas department and region of France.)
- North American Football Union (NAFU) – represents the three countries in North America (not including Central America).
- Union Centroamericana de Fútbol (UNCAF) – represents the seven countries in Central America.

- Anguilla
- Antigua and Barbuda
- Aruba
- Bahamas
- Barbados
- Belize
- Bermuda
- Bonaire^{1}
- British Virgin Islands
- Canada^{₵}
- Cayman Islands
- Costa Rica^{₵}
- Cuba
- Curaçao
- Dominica
- Dominican Republic
- El Salvador
- French Guiana^{1}
- Grenada
- Guadeloupe^{1}
- Guatemala^{₵}
- Guyana
- Haiti^{₵}
- Honduras^{₵}
- Jamaica
- Martinique^{1}
- Mexico^{₵}
- Montserrat
- Nicaragua
- Panama
- Puerto Rico
- Saint Kitts and Nevis
- Saint Lucia
- Saint Martin^{1}
- Saint Vincent and the Grenadines
- Sint Maarten^{1}
- Suriname
- Trinidad and Tobago
- Turks and Caicos Islands
- United States^{₵}
- US Virgin Islands

1. National governing body is a full member of CONCACAF but not a FIFA member

₵. CONCACAF Championship / Gold Cup winners

=== CONMEBOL (South America) ===
The CONMEBOL comprises 10 member associations.

- Argentina^{$}
- Bolivia^{$}
- Brazil^{$}
- Chile^{$}
- Colombia^{$}
- Ecuador
- Paraguay^{$}
- Peru^{$}
- Uruguay^{$}
- Venezuela

$. South American Championship / Copa América winners

=== OFC (Oceania) ===
The OFC has 13 member associations, 11 of which are full members and two which are associate members not affiliated with FIFA.

- American Samoa
- Cook Islands
- Fiji
- Kiribati^{1,2}
- New Caledonia
- New Zealand^{3₴}
- Papua New Guinea
- Samoa
- Solomon Islands
- Tahiti^{4₴}
- Tonga
- Tuvalu^{1,5}
- Vanuatu

1. National governing body is an associate member of the OFC but not a FIFA member
2. National governing body was formerly a member of ConIFA (2016–2025)
3. National governing body was formerly a member of the AFC (1964–1966)
4. Official name used by FIFA and the OFC for French Polynesia
5. National governing body was formerly a member of ConIFA (2016–2020)

₴. Oceania Cup / OFC Nations Cup winners

=== UEFA (Europe) ===
The UEFA comprises 55 national associations.

- Albania
- Andorra
- Armenia
- Austria
- Azerbaijan
- Belarus
- Belgium
- Bosnia and Herzegovina
- Bulgaria
- Croatia
- Cyprus
- Czechia
- Denmark^{€}
- England^{4}
- Estonia
- Faroe Islands
- Finland
- France^{€}
- Georgia
- Germany^{€}
- Gibraltar
- Greece^{€}
- Hungary
- Iceland
- Israel^{1}
- Italy^{€}
- Kazakhstan^{2}
- Kosovo
- Latvia
- Liechtenstein
- Lithuania
- Luxembourg
- Malta
- Moldova
- Montenegro
- Netherlands^{€}
- Northern Ireland^{4}
- North Macedonia
- Norway
- Poland
- Portugal^{€}
- Republic of Ireland
- Romania
- Russia^{3€}
- San Marino
- Scotland^{4}
- Serbia
- Slovakia
- Slovenia
- Spain^{€}
- Sweden
- Switzerland
- Türkiye
- Ukraine
- Wales^{4}

1. National governing body was formerly a member of AFC (1954–1974); joined UEFA in 1994
2. National governing body was formerly a member of AFC (1993–2002)
3. National team currently suspended from participation in FIFA and UEFA competitions in response to Russia's 2022 invasion of Ukraine

€. UEFA European Championship winners

== National teams not affiliated to FIFA confederations ==
The national football teams included in this section are not members of FIFA, or of any of its affiliated continental confederations. The teams are not eligible to enter the FIFA World Cup or any continental confederation championships. FIFA's statutes do not allow member teams to compete against these sides without FIFA's prior permission. Several national associations for teams included in this section are members of ConIFA; these are indicated in the lists below.

This section lists:

- 6 teams representing sovereign states which are member states of the United Nations or non-member observer states with the United Nations General Assembly.
- 7 teams representing states which are not members of the United Nations.

=== Unaffiliated United Nations states ===
Five UN members and one UN General Assembly observer state are not members of FIFA or any continental federation, but have fielded national association-organised teams in matches outside the auspices of FIFA. The national teams of these six states are listed below.

- Federated States of Micronesia
- Marshall Islands
- Monaco^{1}
- Palau^{2}
- United Kingdom^{3}
- Vatican City
1. National governing body was previously a member of the N.F.-Board and ConIFA.
2. National governing body has been an associate member of the OFC in the past, but does not currently appear to be part of the confederation.
3. The United Kingdom's constituent nations (England, Northern Ireland, Scotland, and Wales) are UEFA and FIFA members.

Naoero is the only UN member state to have never fielded a national association-organised football team.

=== Unaffiliated non-UN states ===
Three states with limited international recognition and no UN membership are members of both FIFA and an affiliated confederation: the Republic of China (as Chinese Taipei), Kosovo, and Palestine. The Cook Islands is an associated state with no UN membership, but it is a member of both FIFA and the OFC. The national teams representing these states are all listed above.

A further seven associated, de facto, or partially recognised states with no UN membership have fielded football teams in non-FIFA football tournaments or FIFA-unsanctioned friendly matches. None of these states, however, are currently members of FIFA or any of its affiliated continental confederations. The teams representing these states are listed below.

- Abkhazia^{1}
- Niue^{2}
- Northern Cyprus^{1,3}
- Somaliland^{1}
- South Ossetia^{1}
- Transnistria^{4}
- Western Sahara^{1,3}
1. National governing body is currently a member of ConIFA.
2. National governing body was previously an associate member of the OFC (membership revoked in March 2021).
3. National governing body was previously a member of the N.F.-Board.
4. National governing body was previously a member of ConIFA (2015-unknown).

=== Others ===
Many other teams compete in representative football outside of FIFA's oversight, and some of these claim 'national' status. Historically FIFA did not tightly define "country" and as such twenty-three current FIFA members represent subnational and dependent territories, as well as three representing states with limited international recognition. (Note: The FIFA-affiliated football teams that belong to non-UN members are: 4 states with limited international recognition: Chinese Taipei; Cook Islands; Kosovo; Palestine (also a UN observer state); 4 constituent countries of the United Kingdom: England; Northern Ireland; Scotland; Wales; 7 British Overseas Territories: Anguilla; Bermuda; British Virgin Islands; Cayman Islands; Gibraltar; Montserrat; Turks and Caicos Islands; 2 constituent countries of the Kingdom of the Netherlands: Aruba; Curaçao; 1 constituent country of the Kingdom of Denmark: Faroe Islands; 4 unincorporated territories of the United States: American Samoa; Guam; Puerto Rico; U.S. Virgin Islands; 2 overseas collectivities of France: New Caledonia; Tahiti; 2 special administrative regions of China: Hong Kong, China; Macau) A further nine overseas, dependent, and autonomous territories with close ties to a sovereign state do not have membership in FIFA, but are members of one of its affiliated confederations (either in a full or associate capacity). In 2016 however, FIFA made changes to its statutes to define 'country' as "an independent state recognised by the international community", which has made membership of FIFA harder for aspirant national teams. Nonetheless, several organisations exist to encourage, facilitate or promote representative football outside of FIFA, and many of their members claim the status of national football teams:

- Confederation of Independent Football Associations (CONIFA)
- International Island Games Association (IIGA)
- Union of Arab Football Associations (UAFA)
- Indian Ocean Island Games
- Pacific Games

== Teams representing former states or territories ==
These national teams no longer exist due to the dissolution of the nation or territory that they represented. Only teams that held FIFA membership at some point, or those that represented states with limited recognition and have been members of the N.F.-Board or ConIFA, are included on the table.

Preceding team	Successor team (inherited position/results)	Other successor team(s)	Notes
Czechoslovakia (Representation of Czechs and Slovaks in 1993)	Czech Republic; Slovakia		Represented Czechoslovakia until its dissolution into the Czech Republic and Slovakia in 1993. Jointly represented both nations during the remainder of their 1994 World Cup qualifying games.
Saar	Joined the German Football Association; now part of the Germany national football team. Historical results and achievements listed separately.		Represented the Saarland Protectorate from 1950 to 1956 before its union with the Federal Republic of Germany.
East Germany (officially German Democratic Republic)	Joined the German Football Association; dissolved in November 1990. Historical results and achievements listed separately.		Represented East Germany between 1952 and 1990, before reunification with West Germany.
Ireland	Northern Ireland	Republic of Ireland	Represented Ireland from 1882. From 1922, when the Irish Free State (later Republic of Ireland) left the United Kingdom, until 1953, it continued to pick players from across the Island of Ireland, before becoming restricted to players solely from Northern Ireland under pressure from FIFA.
Malaya	Malaysia		Represented the Federation of Malaya from 1953 until its union with Sarawak, North Borneo and Singapore to form Malaysia in 1963. Singapore, which gained independence in 1965, retained its preexisting national team.
Tanganyika	Tanzania		Represented Tanganyika until its union with Zanzibar as Tanzania in 1964. Zanzibar is an associate member of CAF and so is not a member of FIFA.
South Vietnam	Vietnam		Represented South Vietnam from 1949 until 1975. A separate team representing North Vietnam never received FIFA or AFC membership. On the reunification of Vietnam, both the North and South teams ceased to exist, with a unified Vietnam national football team taking the South's place in both FIFA and the AFC.
North Yemen (officially Yemen Arab Republic)	Yemen		Represented North Yemen from 1965 until its union with South Yemen in 1990.
South Yemen (officially People's Democratic Republic of Yemen)	Joined the Yemen Football Association; now part of the Yemen national football team. Historical results and achievements listed separately.		Represented South Yemen from 1965 until its union with North Yemen in 1990.
United Arab Republic	Egypt	Syria	Represented the United Arab Republic from 1958 to 1961 until the secession of Syria. Was considered a continuation of the previous Egypt national football team, which became its successor team. The team continued to be known as the United Arab Republic until 1970.
Mandatory Palestine	Israel	Palestine	Represented the British Mandate of Palestine from 1934 to 1940. The team ceased to exist after the creation of the State of Israel in 1948, with FIFA recognizing the Israel national football team as the successor to the Mandatory Palestine football team. A separate team representing the Palestinian Territories was created in 1953 and accepted into FIFA in 1998.
Russian Empire	Soviet Union		Represented the Russian Empire from 1912 to 1923 until its transition into the Soviet Union.
Soviet Union (officially Union of Soviet Socialist Republics)	CIS	Estonia; Latvia; Lithuania	Represented the Soviet Union from 1940 until its dissolution in 1991. This was considered a continuation of the team that had previously represented the Russian Empire. Estonia, Latvia and Lithuania had all had active football teams prior to their incorporation into the Soviet Union in 1940, and did not participate in the CIS team.
CIS	Russia	Armenia; Azerbaijan; Belarus; Georgia; Kazakhstan; Kyrgyzstan; Moldova; Tajikistan; Turkmenistan; Ukraine; Uzbekistan	Represented the Commonwealth of Independent States, as well as Georgia which was not a CIS member at the time, from January to June 1992; until the end of the UEFA Euro 1992 tournament.
Yugoslavia	FR Yugoslavia	Bosnia and Herzegovina; Croatia; North Macedonia; Slovenia	Represented Yugoslavia between 1920 and 1992, before the dissolution of the Socialist Federal Republic of Yugoslavia into Bosnia and Herzegovina, Croatia, Federal Republic of Yugoslavia, North Macedonia and Slovenia
Serbia and Montenegro	Serbia	Montenegro; Kosovo	Represented the Federal Republic of Yugoslavia, known as Serbia and Montenegro after 2003, from 1992 until its dissolution into Serbia and Montenegro in 2006; the unified team still played the 2006 FIFA World Cup, because the dissolution process was only concluded one week before the start of the tournament with Montenegro's declaration of independence, following the referendum in May of that year. Kosovo declared independence from Serbia in 2008, and its national team was accepted into UEFA and FIFA in 2016.
Netherlands Antilles	Curaçao	Aruba; Bonaire; Sint Maarten; Saba; Sint Eustatius	Aruba became a separate autonomous territory in 1986 and was accepted into FIFA in 1988. The former team represented the Netherlands Antilles until the dissolution of the country in 2010. Formerly known as "Curaçao", this name was restored in March 2011 when the new constituent country of Curaçao was given the Netherlands Antilles' place in FIFA and CONCACAF. The teams representing the former Netherlands Antilles territories of Bonaire and Sint Maarten are full members of CONCACAF but not of FIFA. Two other former Netherlands Antilles territories (Saba and Sint Eustatius) have fielded national teams in unofficial friendly matches in the past, but neither has membership of FIFA or a continental federation.

=== New names ===
In addition to the above, other teams have been renamed:

- Belgian Congo → Congo-Léopoldville in 1960 → Congo-Kinshasa in 1963 → Zaire in 1971 → DR Congo in 1997
- (United Kingdom) British Gambia → Gambia in 1965
- British Guiana → Guyana in 1966
- British Honduras → Belize in 1981
- (United Kingdom) British Mauritius → Mauritius in 1968
- (United Kingdom) British Somaliland → Somalia in 1960
- Burma → Myanmar in 1989
- Cambodia → Khmer Republic in 1970 → Kampuchea in 1975 → Cambodia in 1979
- Ceylon → Sri Lanka in 1972
- Curaçao → Netherlands Antilles in 1958 until 2010
- Czechoslovakia → Bohemia and Moravia → Czechoslovakia → Representation of Czechs and Slovaks in 1993
- Czech Republic → Czechia in 2022
- Dahomey → Benin in 1975
- Dutch East Indies → Indonesia in 1945
- Egypt → United Arab Republic in 1958 → Egypt in 1971
- FR Yugoslavia → Serbia and Montenegro in 2003
- FYR Macedonia → North Macedonia in 2019
- French Somaliland → Djibouti in 1977
- French Togoland → Togo in 1960
- Germany → Germany FR in 1945 → Germany in 1990
- Gold Coast → Ghana in 1957
- Irish Free State → Ireland in 1936 → Republic of Ireland in 1954
- Ivory Coast → Côte d'Ivoire in 1983
- Kingdom of Serbs, Croats, and Slovenes → Yugoslavia in 1929
- (France) Madagascar → Malagasy Republic in 1958 → Madagascar in 1975
- Mandatory Palestine → Israel in 1948
- (France) Middle Congo → Congo-Brazzaville in 1960 → PR Congo in 1970 → Congo in 1992
- New Hebrides → Vanuatu in 1980
- Northern Rhodesia → Zambia in 1964
- Nyasaland → Malawi in 1966
- (Portugal) Portuguese East Africa → Mozambique in 1975
- (Portugal) Portuguese Guinea → Guinea-Bissau in 1975
- (Portugal) Portuguese West Africa → Angola in 1975
- China → Taiwan in 1954 → Chinese Taipei in 1980
- Southern Rhodesia → Rhodesia in 1964 → Zimbabwe in 1980
- (Netherlands) Surinam → Suriname in 1954
- Swaziland → Eswatini in 2018
- Turkey → Türkiye in 2022
- Upper Volta → Burkina Faso in 1984
- Vietnam → South Vietnam in 1955
- Western Samoa → Samoa in 1997

== See also ==
- Geography of association football
- List of FIFA country codes
- List of women's national association football teams
- Category:National and official selection-teams not affiliated to FIFA
- List of association football competitions
