= Football in Sint Eustatius =

The Statia Football Association was founded in 1980, with Mike Franco serving as president for a time, and they administered association football on the island of Sint Eustatius. It is not known if the organisation is still formally extant. If so, the association administers the men's national team, as well as the Sint Eustatius Football League. However, the league was only active from 1980 until 1985.

Prior to the dissolution of the Netherlands Antilles, the men's national team played several friendlies (most likely 7-a-side) against the neighbouring island Saba. These continued up untl around 2011, though there is some evidence of them since restarting from Saba's records. It is not known whether or not girls are also able to play football on the island, as they are on Saba. Limited training was done on the island by KNVB coaches in 2021.

All football on the island is played at Cottage Ball Park, a Cruyff Court which was constructed from around 2007. It was closed for an unknown period of time, opening after renovation in 2019, with further work being done in 2021. While not large enough for 11-a-side play, it nonetheless hosts all the island's football activity.
