= Leo Beenhakker =

Dutch football coach (1942–2025)

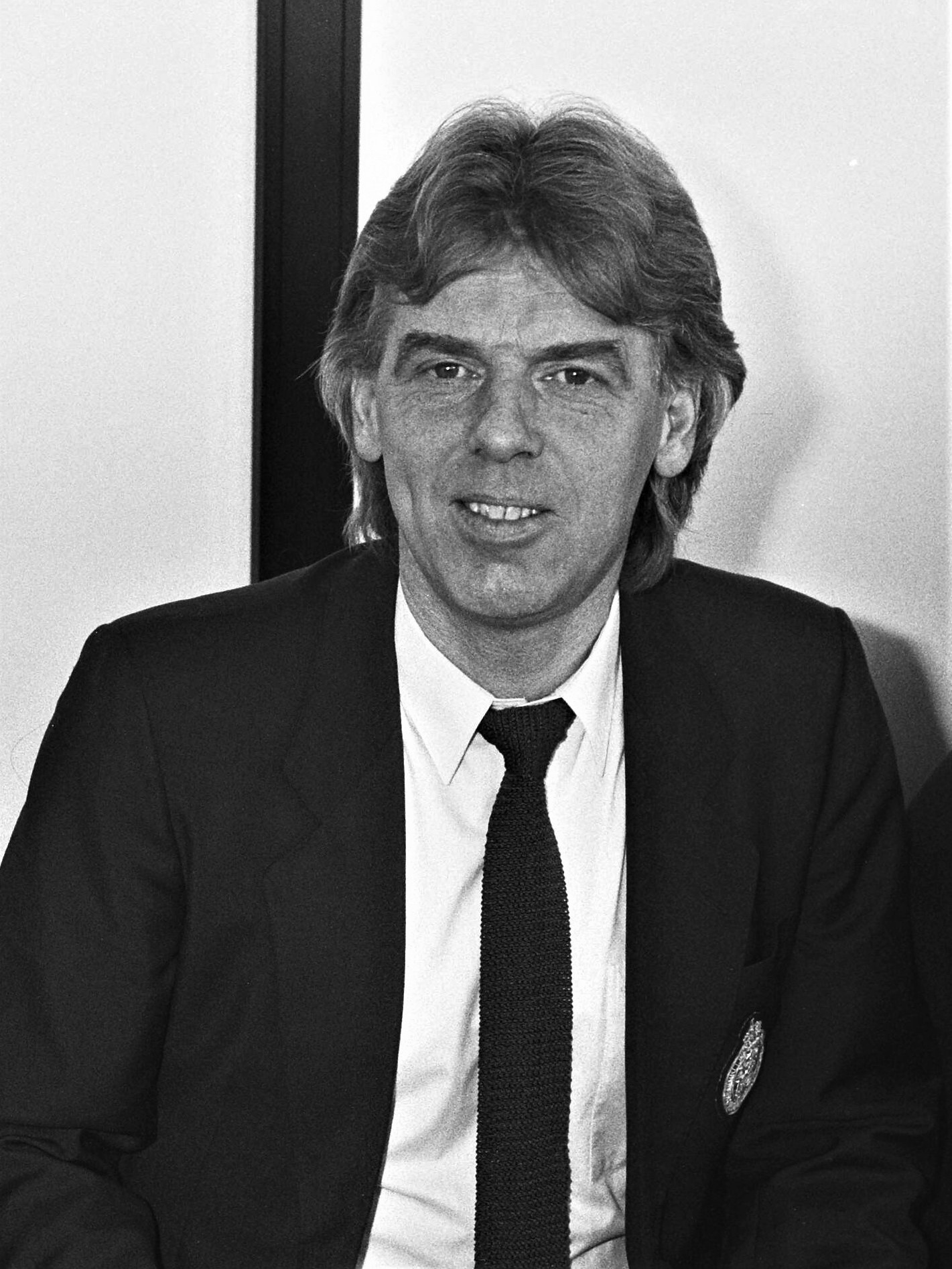
- Beenhakker in 1986

Personal information
- Date of birth: 2 August 1942
- Place of birth: Rotterdam, German-occupied Netherlands
- Date of death: 10 April 2025 (aged 82)
- Place of death: Rotterdam, Netherlands
- Position: Right winger

Youth career
- 1954–1958: Maasstad Tediro
- 1958–1961: Xerxes

Senior career*
Years	Team	Apps	(Gls)
1957–1958	Maasstad Tediro		
1960–1961	Xerxes		
1964–1965	Zwart-Wit '28		

Managerial career
- 1965–1967: Epe
- 1968–1972: Veendam
- 1972–1975: Cambuur
- 1975–1976: Go Ahead Eagles
- 1979–1981: Ajax
- 1981–1984: Real Zaragoza
- 1984–1985: Volendam
- 1985–1986: Netherlands (interim)
- 1986–1989: Real Madrid
- 1989–1991: Ajax
- 1990: Netherlands
- 1992: Real Madrid
- 1992–1993: Grasshoppers
- 1993–1994: Saudi Arabia
- 1994–1995: Club América
- 1995: İstanbulspor
- 1996: Guadalajara
- 1996–1997: Vitesse
- 1997–2000: Feyenoord
- 2003–2004: Club América
- 2005–2006: Trinidad and Tobago
- 2006–2009: Poland
- 2007: Feyenoord (interim)
- * Club domestic league appearances and goals

Leo Beenhakker (Dutch: [ˈleːjoː ˈbeːnɦɑkər]; 2 August 1942 – 10 April 2025) was a Dutch football player and coach. Nicknamed "Don Leo" for his role in Spanish football, he had an extensive and successful career both at club and international level.

After his amateur playing career ended at 19 through injury, he began his coaching career. He won the Eredivisie title twice with Ajax and once with Feyenoord, becoming the only person to do so with both rival teams. In Spain he won three consecutive La Liga titles with Real Madrid in the late 1980s, including one as a double with the Copa del Rey. Additionally, he had brief spells in the top divisions of Switzerland, Mexico and Turkey.

At international level, he led the Netherlands at the 1990 FIFA World Cup, Trinidad and Tobago at the 2006 FIFA World Cup and Poland at UEFA Euro 2008, the latter two being firsts for both nations.

== Early life and playing career ==
Beenhakker was born in the Charlois neighborhood in Rotterdam on 2 August 1942, during the Nazi occupation of the Netherlands. After his father's death, he worked as an electrician to support his family.

=== Playing career ===
A right winger, Beenhakker played only for amateur clubs, and he joined Maasstad Tediro in 1954; he made his senior debut in 1957 at the age of 15. He then joined Xerxes in 1958 and suffered a knee injury in 1961 while playing for Xerxes which later ended his playing career.

He went into mandatory military service with the Dutch Air Force and while working as an electrician, he attempted a return to playing football during the 1964–65 season, joining Zwart-Wit '28. He retired in 1965 at the age of 23 as a result of the knee injury.

== Coaching career ==
=== Early career ===
Beenhakker began coaching Epe in 1965 before his breakthrough at Ajax, where he won the Eredivisie in his debut season in 1979–80. He also gave Frank Rijkaard his professional debut and reached the semi-finals of the European Cup.

Beenhakker arrived at Real Zaragoza to replace Manolo Villanova during the 1980–81 season, aged 38. His side, which included the likes of Juan Señor, Jorge Valdano and Pichi Alonso, won no trophies during his term, but finished in high league positions including 6th in 1982–83 and 7th a year later.

=== Volendam and Real Madrid ===
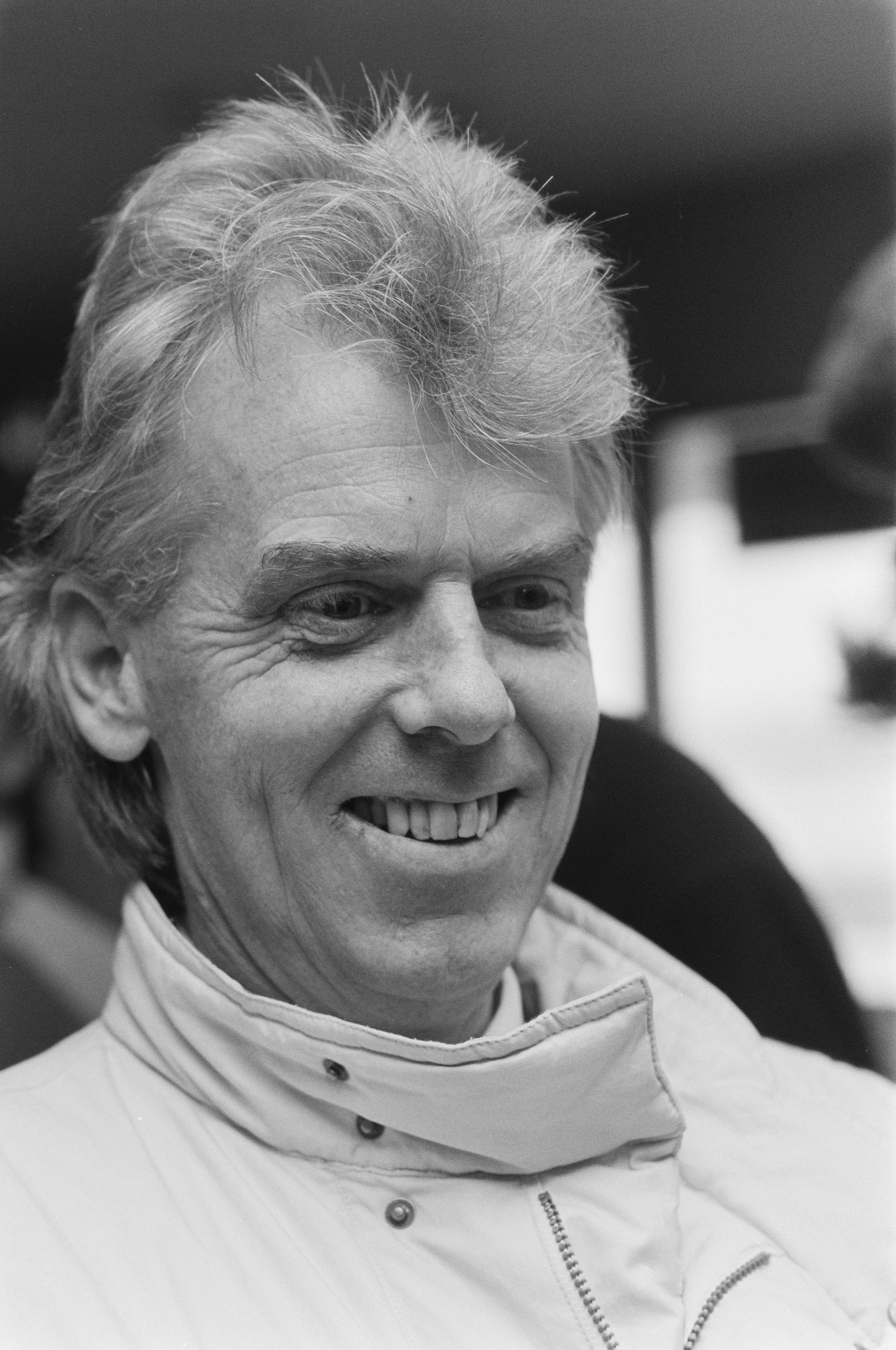
Beenhakker as Real Madrid manager in February 1989

As manager of Volendam in 1984–85, Beenhakker took the club as high as third place, leading to him being simultaneously named interim manager of the Netherlands national team due to Rinus Michels' heart problems. Volendam finished the season relegated, while the Netherlands finished second to Hungary in their 1986 FIFA World Cup qualification group, before losing a playoff to rivals Belgium on the away goals rule.

He was Real Madrid's most recent manager to win both La Liga and Copa del Rey in the same season. His Real Madrid side was built around La Quinta del Buitre, five academy-trained players centred on forward Emilio Butragueño. In the 1988–89 European Cup, he caused headlines by dropping Butragueño for a European Cup quarter-final second leg against reigning champions PSV Eindhoven, despite the tie being level; Arrigo Sacchi's AC Milan eliminated Real Madrid in the semi-finals after winning the second leg 5–0 at the San Siro.

=== Ajax return and 1990 World Cup ===
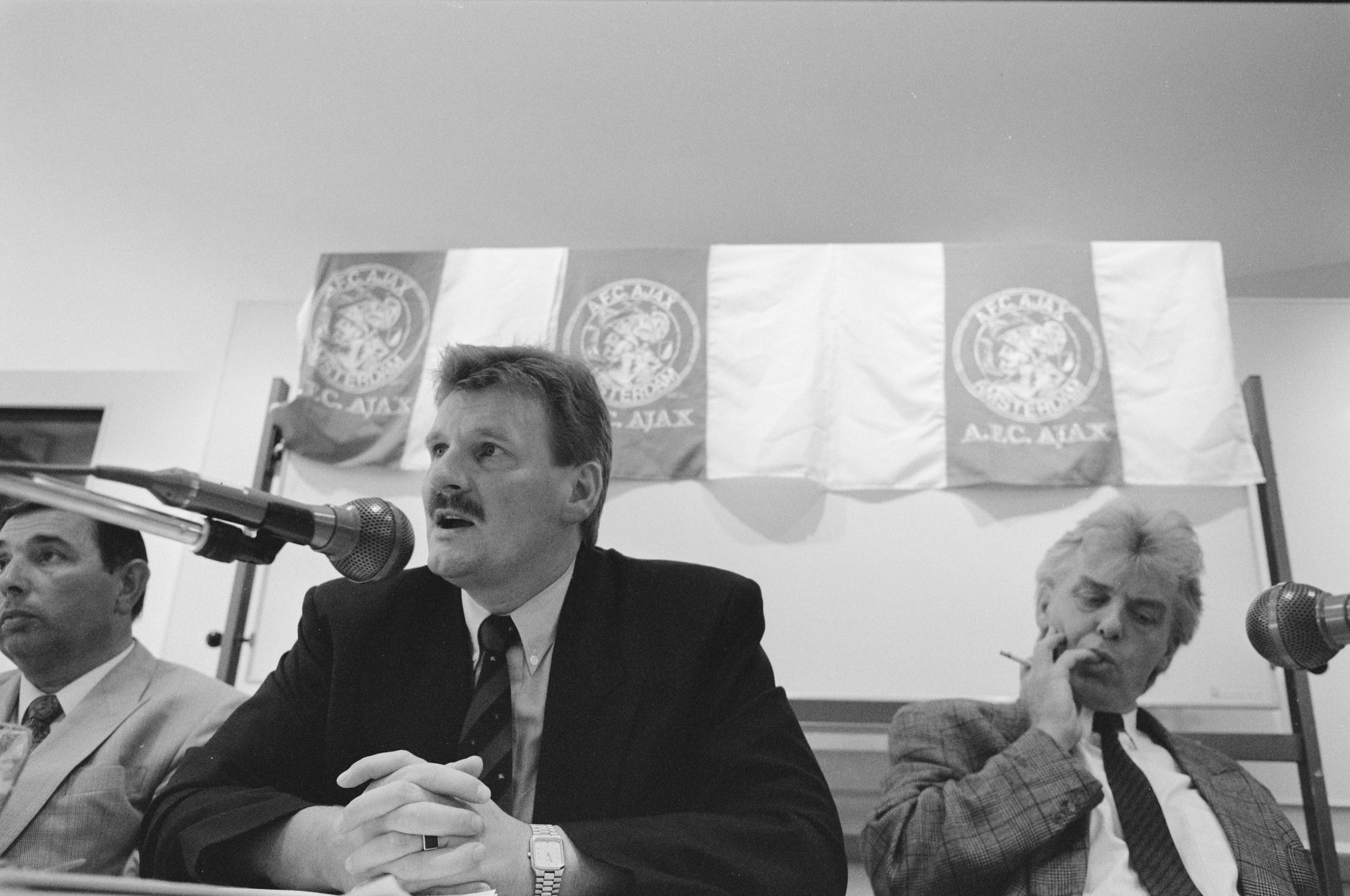
Beenhakker (furthest right) at a press conference with Ajax in July 1989

In 1989, Beenhakker returned to Ajax, who had struggled the previous season and were experiencing financial problems. His young team, featuring the likes of twins Frank and Ronald de Boer, Dennis Bergkamp and Bryan Roy, won the league but were banned from entering the European Cup due to a hooligan riot in a UEFA Cup game against Austria Wien in September 1989. In October 1989, Beenhakker fined five of his players 1,000 Dutch guilders each for losing a Netherlands under-21 game against Iceland; Frank de Boer's fine was halved due to only being a substitute in that game.

Beenhakker was named manager of the Netherlands again for the 1990 FIFA World Cup in Italy. His side were the reigning European champions of UEFA Euro 1988, and were favoured to do well due to having high-profile players such as Ruud Gullit, Frank Rijkaard and Marco van Basten. The Oranje were eliminated in the round of 16 without winning a game, with Beenhakker rumoured to have fallen out with Van Basten, and the players wanting Johan Cruyff as manager instead.

=== Early 1990s ===
In October 1991, Beenhakker left Ajax and returned to Real Madrid, initially as technical director to support Radomir Antić, but swapped places with him to become manager at the end of January 1992. He left at the end of the season, after finishing in second place. His team missed out on the title on the final day after losing a lead away to Tenerife, while Cruyff's Barcelona defeated Athletic Bilbao.

Beenhakker was named manager of Grasshoppers in the Swiss Nationalliga A in 1992–93. He succeeded Oldrich Svab at the Zurich-based club, who were struggling despite the presence of players such as Giovane Élber and Murat Yakin. The team fell into the promotion-relegation round, which they survived, but he was dispensed of at the end of the season.

In November 1993, Beenhakker was appointed manager of Saudi Arabia, who had qualified for the FIFA World Cup for the first time. He was sacked just three months later, and four months before the finals in the United States, as the players did not adapt well to his tactics.

=== 1994–2004: Eredivisie return and Mexico ===
Beenhakker was appointed at Club América in Mexico on 15 June 1994. His team included African players such as François Omam-Biyik of Cameroon and Kalusha Bwalya from Zambia. Despite winning 18 and losing 4 of his 31 matches, he was removed with no official explanation on 6 April 1995. In 2010, he said in an interview that this was because he had argued with club president Emilio Diez Barroso, who did not want Joaquín del Olmo in the team due to the cost of the player.

In 1995, Beenhakker was the manager of İstanbulspor in the Turkish 1. Lig. Returning to Mexico, he led Guadalajara in 1996, taking exactly half of the 84 potential points from matches during his tenure. On 18 February, his team won a Súper Clásico 3–2 against América; losing 2–1 at half time, he motivated the squad by telling them to enjoy the experience at the sold-out game as if they were children.

Beenhakker returned to the Eredivisie with Vitesse in 1996–97. His one season with the club from Arnhem, starting as manager but becoming technical director halfway his first season, resulted in a 5th-place finish and qualification for the UEFA Cup. Moving on to his hometown club Feyenoord in November 1997, he won the league title in 1998–99. As of his death, he is the only person to win the title with rivals Ajax and Feyenoord.

From 2000 to 2003, Beenhakker was director of technical affairs with Ajax. In that period, he fired head coach Co Adriaanse and replaced him with Ronald Koeman. He was also responsible for the signing of Sweden international Zlatan Ibrahimović from Malmö FF.

In the 2003 Apertura tournament, Beenhakker returned to América. He was sacked with a year remaining of his contract after quarter-final elimination from the 2004 Clausura.

=== Trinidad and Tobago ===
On 1 April 2005, Beenhakker was appointed by Trinidad and Tobago, succeeding Bertille St. Clair. The Soca Warriors were last placed in the final round of qualifying for the 2006 World Cup with one point from three games. He called up 23 foreign-based players for his first training camp, and on 4 June he won on his debut, a 2–0 home victory over Panama. On 13 October, the team won 2–1 at home to Mexico on the final day to make the playoffs at the expense of Guatemala; striker Stern John scored both goals despite earlier missing a penalty.

Beenhakker coached the team to qualify for the 2006 FIFA World Cup, the country's first-ever World Cup appearance, after a 1–0 win away against Bahrain via a header by Dennis Lawrence as Trinidad and Tobago won 2–1 on aggregate. Beenhakker was awarded the Chaconia Medal (Gold Class), the second highest state decoration of Trinidad and Tobago.

Drawn in the Group B at the World Cup, the team secured a 0–0 draw against Sweden in their first match, and lost to both England and Paraguay 2–0.

=== Poland ===
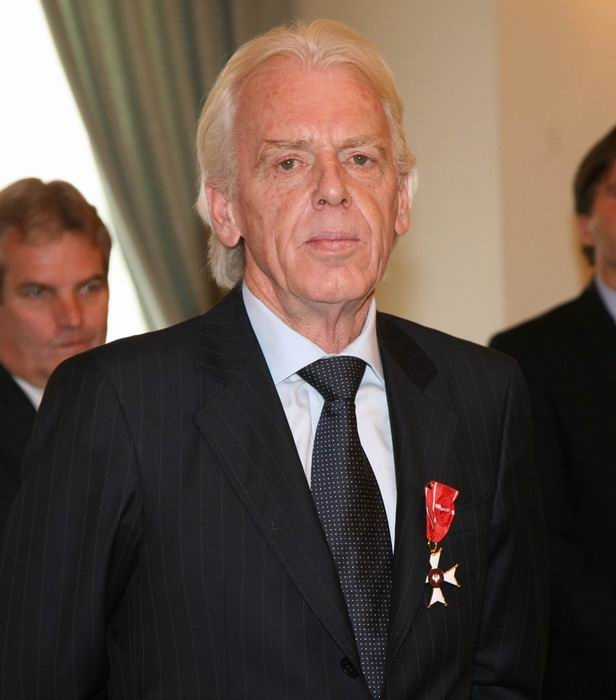
Beenhakker, decorated in 2008 with the Order of Polonia Restituta

On 11 July 2006, Beenhakker was appointed as the manager of the Poland national team. He succeeded Paweł Janas after the team had also been eliminated from the group stages of the World Cup, and was the first foreigner to lead the national team. He established scouting missions in Germany and the Netherlands so that the team would not lose out on diaspora players.

After Poland defeated Belgium 2–0 on 17 November 2007, he managed to qualify the team for the UEFA European Championship for their first time. Poland won 8 of their 14 qualifying matches. On 20 February 2008, Beenhakker was decorated with the Order of Polonia Restituta by Polish president Lech Kaczyński. At UEFA Euro 2008 in Austria and Switzerland, Poland faced Germany in a group match. Polish tabloids depicted Beenhakker with the severed heads of German captain Michael Ballack and manager Joachim Löw; Beenhakker personally apologised to the German people and called the journalists "mad, dirty and sick".

Following the tournament, Beenhakker's contract was extended until November 2009, the end of qualifying for the 2010 World Cup. After Poland's failure to qualify for the tournament in South Africa, Beenhakker was sacked.

=== Feyenoord ===
While still in charge of Poland, Feyenoord hired Beenhakker on 5 May 2007 as an interim coach to lead the club through the 2006–07 play-offs. After his departure from Poland, he was named the sports director of the club, signing a contract on 9 October 2009 lasting until 30 June 2011.

=== Sparta Rotterdam ===
In December 2013, Beenhakker was appointed technical director at Sparta Rotterdam, a position he held on to until June 2015, before announcing his retirement from football. In November 2017, he joined the Sparta board as a technical advisor, which he did voluntarily until Sparta found a technical director. In March 2018, when Sparta appointed Henk van Stee, Beenhakker left his post and announced his retirement again.

== Style of management ==
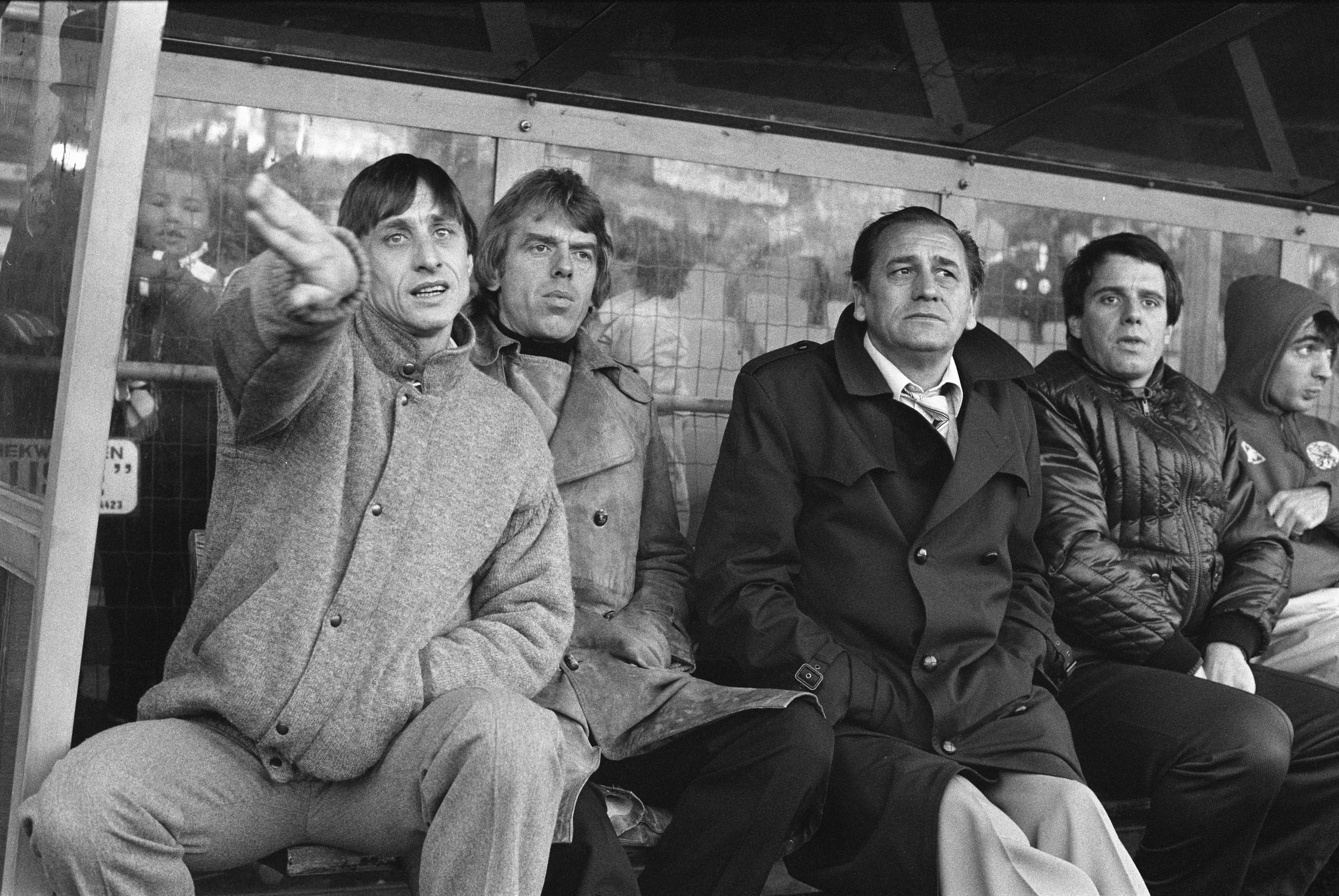
Johan Cruyff (furthest left) and Beenhakker (next from the left) with Ajax in 1980. The two coaches had a difficult working relationship.

Simon Kuper, author of several books on Dutch football, opined that Beenhakker lacked the tactical knowledge for elite players, but made up for it with his speaking skills. Beenhakker faced scrutiny for never having been a professional player, responding that a milkman does not need experience of being a cow.

Johan Cruyff chided Beenhakker as a "schoolteacher" for not having professional playing experience. While an advisor at Ajax, Cruyff broke protocol and ordered Beenhakker to change tactics; Beenhakker later reflected that he should have punched Cruyff for this intervention. According to Beenhakker, he and Cruyff later privately cleared the air regarding this incident and were on amicable terms when they both worked in Spain in the late 1980s and early 1990s.

Zlatan Ibrahimović praised Beenhakker in his autobiography I Am Zlatan Ibrahimović. Ibrahimović described Beenhakker's image as a "mafioso", a "dominant figure and decision maker", and a "harder" version of Emmett Brown from Back to the Future. In Spain, he was nicknamed Don Leo. Trinidad and Tobago players Dwight Yorke and Kelvin Jack reflected that Beenhakker was a great leader of their team.

Joachim Löw said that Beenhakker's Poland team that his Germany side faced at Euro 2008 played in an attacking manner similar to the Netherlands. He added that they were much stronger than the Poland team Germany had defeated at the 2006 World Cup.

== Personal life and death ==
Beenhakker died in Rotterdam on 10 April 2025, at the age of 82. He had a son and a daughter from his first marriage.

In the weekend after Beenhakker's death, a minute of silence was observed before the start of every match in the Dutch professional football competitions.

== Legacy ==
In September 2026, the Johan Cruyff Foundation opened a Cruyff Court in honor of Leo Beenhakker, in the Charlois neighbourhood in Rotterdam where he grew up. Within a short distance of the court, there is also a mural of the manager painted on the side of one of the apartment buildings.

== Honours ==
Ajax

- Eredivisie: 1979–80, 1989–90

Real Madrid

- La Liga: 1986–87, 1987–88, 1988–89
- Copa del Rey: 1988–89
- Supercopa de España: 1988, 1989 (won both Copa del Rey and La Liga)

Feyenoord

- Eredivisie: 1998–99
- Johan Cruyff Shield: 1999

Individual

- Chaconia Medal, Gold Class: 2006
- Order of Polonia Restituta, Officer's Cross: 2008
- Piłka Nożna Foreigner of the Year: 2006
- Piłka Nożna Man of the Year: 2007
- Rinus Michels Lifetime Achievement Award (Rinus Michels Oeuvreprijs): 2010
- KNVB Honorary Knight of the Association (Bondsridder): 2 August 2017

== See also ==
- List of La Liga winning managers
- De Klassieker
