= Cruyff Court Saba =

Soccer stadium in The Bottom, Saba

- Interactive map of Cruyff Court Saba
- Full name: Cruyff Court Saba
- Former names: Man-O-War Ground
- Location: The Bottom, Saba
- Coordinates: 17.6256°N 63.2489°W
- Owner: Government of Saba
- Surface: Artificial turf
- Field size: 157ft x 173ft

Construction
- Built: 2010
- Opened: April 2011
- Architect: Janssen de Jong Infra Design B.V.
- Main contractor: Windward Roads Infrastructure

Tenant
- Saba national soccer team

Cruyff Court Saba is a soccer stadium in The Bottom, Saba, a public body of the Netherlands in the Caribbean. It is the only stadium on the island and currently hosts local soccer activity, and occasionally baseball and softball. It officially opened in April 2011 and holds the distinction of being the largest Cruyff Court in the world.

== History ==
In 1999 local resident Lynne Johnson began organizing soccer lessons at the Man-O-War Ground. When the rental agreement ended, the property was purchased by the Man-of-War Ground Foundation with the purpose of creating a new sports facility. With donations from individuals and the Johan Cruyff Foundation, the Man-of-War Ground Foundation was able to purchase the property and construct the stadium. The total cost to purchase the necessary properties was 137,000 NAƒ. The property was selected because previously an area large and flat enough to accommodate a sports facility was difficult to identify.

The Johann Cruyff Foundation began building stadiums in the Dutch Caribbean and around the world in 2007. The stadiums in Sint Maarten, Sint Eustatius, and Saba were designed by Dutch architect Janssen de Jong Infra Design B.V. and include artificial turf, fencing, and other necessary equipment with an emphasis on soccer. Saba's stadium was completed in April 2011. The following month the stadium hosted Queen Beatrix as she toured the islands of the former Netherlands Antilles.

Despite being the largest stadium built by the organization, it did not originally include any lighting which limited its use to day time. In December 2018 it was announced that the stadium would receive LED lighting. The light project was not completed until February 2021 because finding and shipping hurricane-proof light poles was difficult. The project was also delayed by the COVID-19 pandemic. The four light masts were specially designed and manufactured in the Netherlands and accommodate four LED floodlights each.

In May 2019 Paul Blokhuis, Dutch Minister of Health, Welfare and Sport, identified upgrading the stadium with protection from the sun as a priority as the Ministry sought to promote health and exercise throughout the kingdom. In August 2021 it was announced that the artificial surface at the stadium would be replaced. That same month the stadium hosted a soccer clinic for females by former Dutch international Anouk Hoogendijk.

As part of a 2022 renovation, the turf was replaced, the field was leveled, and the backwall was reinforced. The surface was enlarged slightly, creating space for the addition of two track lanes and a volleyball court, for a total area of 2973m². Commissioner of Sport Rolando Wilson Stated at the time that Saba would now be able to invite other islands for sports competitions because of the renovations.

== See also ==
- Soccer in Saba
