= Sint Eustatius national football team =

Caribbean national football team

Sint Eustatius
- Association: Statia Football Association
- Home stadium: Cottage Ball Park
First colours	Second colours

First international
- Sint Eustatius 3–1 Saba (Oranjestad, Sint Eustatius; 3 April 2004)

Biggest win
- Sint Eustatius 3–1 Saba (Oranjestad, Sint Eustatius; 3 April 2004); Sint Eustatius 2–0 Anguilla (Oranjestad, Sint Eustatius; 11 December 2004); Saba 3–5 Sint Eustatius (The Bottom, Saba; 15 July 2006)

Biggest defeat
- Sint Eustatius 0–6 Saint Kitts and Nevis (Oranjestad, Sint Eustatius; unknown date 2007)

The Sint Eustatius national football team (Dutch: Sint Eustatius voetbalelftal) is the national association football team of the Caribbean island of Sint Eustatius. It is a not member of the Caribbean Football Union, CONCACAF, or FIFA and therefore cannot compete in tournaments sanctioned by these organisations. It is under the auspices of the Statia Football Association.

== History ==
Formerly Sint Eustatius was represented in international football by the Netherlands Antilles national football team until the country was dissolved on 10 October 2010 and Sint Eustatius became a separate Special Municipality. Since 2004 Sint Eustatius has played at least nine international friendlies against neighboring island Saba in a series of inter-island matches.

The national football team of Bonaire, another island that holds the status of Special Municipality within the Kingdom of the Netherlands, has been a member of the CFU and CONCACAF since 2013 through the support of the Dutch KNVB, leaving open the possibility for Sint Eustatius membership in the governing bodies. In August 2021 the KNVB, joined by Bert Zuurman and former Aruba national team coach Elvis Albertus, organized a football course on the island.

== Stadium ==
The team's home stadium is the Cottage Ball Park in the capital of Oranjestad, the only football venue on the island.

== List of international matches ==
As of 6 May 2011.

Date	Venue	Opponent	Score
August 1982	Sint Eustatius	(Sint Maarten) Sparta	1–4
August 1982	Sint Eustatius	(Sint Maarten) Sparta	1–5
3 April 2004	Sint Eustatius	Saba	3–1
August 2004	Sint Eustatius	Saint Martin	3–3
20 August 2004	Sint Eustatius	Sint Maarten	2–2
11 December 2004	Sint Eustatius	Anguilla	2–0
15 July 2006	Saba	Sint Eustatius	3–5
16 July 2006	Saba	Sint Eustatius	5–5
2007	Saint Kitts and Nevis	Sint Eustatius	1–5
2007	Saint Kitts and Nevis	Sint Eustatius	0–6
2007	Saint Kitts and Nevis	Sint Eustatius	2–2
2007	Saint Kitts and Nevis	Sint Eustatius	2–2
2007	Sint Eustatius	Saint Kitts and Nevis	3–5
20 June 2009	Sint Eustatius	Saba	Unknown
21 June 2009	Sint Eustatius	Saba	Unknown
27 March 2010	Saba	Sint Eustatius	2–1
28 March 2010	Saba	Sint Eustatius	1–2
28 March 2010	Saba	Sint Eustatius	2–2
6 May 2011	Sint Eustatius U23	Saba	2–1
29 October 2011	Sint Eustatius Youth	Saba Youth	Unknown
30 October 2011	Sint Eustatius Youth	Saba Youth	Unknown
17 April 2020	Sint Eustatius Youth	Saba Youth	Unknown
19 April 2020	Sint Eustatius Youth	Saba Youth	Unknown

Youth matches between the islands were organized on 29 October 2011
