= Juliana Sports Field =

Public recreational area in The Bottom, Saba

- Interactive map of Juliana Sports Field
- Location: The Bottom, Saba
- Coordinates: 17.6256°N 63.2489°W
- Owner: Government of Saba

Construction
- Built: 1970s

The Juliana Sports Field is one of two public recreational areas on the Caribbean island of Saba, along with the Cruyff Court Saba, and is located in the capital of The Bottom. It underwent major renovations in 2021.

== History ==
The facility was first opened in the 1970s, and is one of the oldest sporting facilities in Saba. It is located in the capital of The Bottom and is one of two public recreational areas, along with the Cruyff Court Saba, in the island. It was located on the property of the former croquet field, and was named after Juliana of the Netherlands, who visited the facility, during one of her visits to the island. In 2013, King Willem-Alexander and Queen Maxima of the Netherlands visited the sports field.

The sports field underwent a four-month renovation which included a new surface for the basketball court which was completed in February 2021, and addition of a netball court. As per the local authorities, the facility served as a vital component of the island's sports and cultural infrastructure, and contributed to public health, and engagement. Hence, the project was funded by the Ministry of Public Health, Welfare and Sports. Improvements such as repainting of the walls, installation of new woodwork and emergency exits, and expansion of other facilities were taken up during the renovation.

== Usage ==
The Juliana Sports Field is primarily used for sporting events. It also hosts music concerts. It has also hosted Saba Day celebrations and other cultural events such as the Saba Summer Festival. It hosted the Emancipation Day, commemorating the abolishment of slavery in Saba, in 2024.
