= Cottage Ball Park =

Sports facility on the Caribbean island of Sint Eustatius

- Interactive map of Cottage Ball Park
- Location: Sandy Road, Oranjestad, Sint Eustatius
- Coordinates: 17.4857192°N 62.9856942°W
- Owner: Government of Saint Eustatius

Tenant
- Sint Eustatius national football team

The Cottage Ball Bank is the main sports facility on the Caribbean island of Sint Eustatius. The facility contains a football pitch, open-air swimming pool, sports hall, baseball field (known as the Fredrick Cranston Ball Field), and several other fields. The facilities are also used by the island's schools. It is the national stadium as it hosts the matches of the Sint Eustatius national football team. In 2019 the Government of Sint Eustatius financed a number of renovation and expansion projects at the facility.

The facility also houses a Cruyff Court football pitch with artificial turf which was donated by the Johan Cruyff Foundation. Construction of the court began in 2006. It was refurbished in 2019. In 2021 a canopy roof was installed over the court.
