= List of La Liga winning managers =

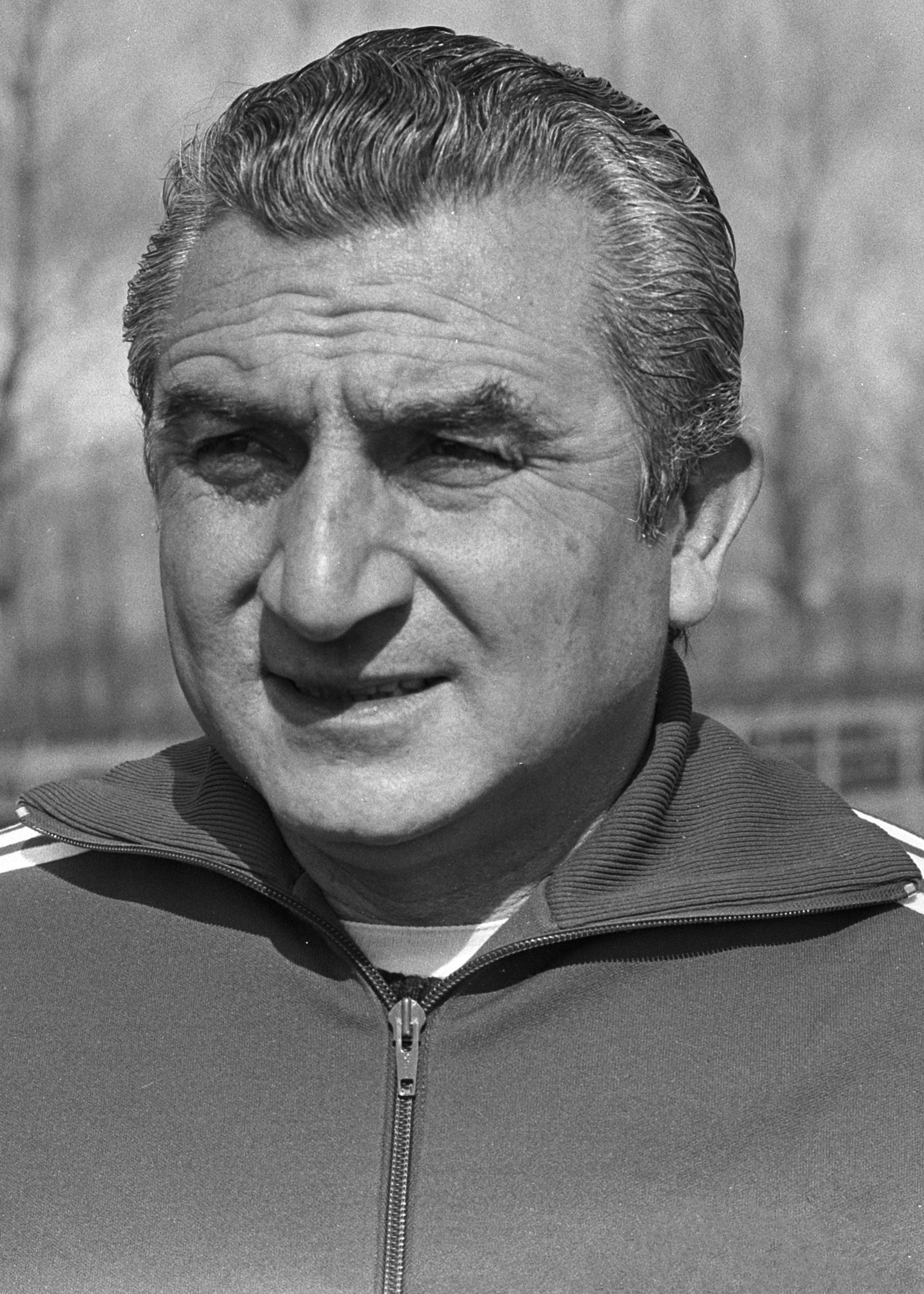
Miguel Muñoz won La Liga a record nine times

This is a list of La Liga winning football managers.

Miguel Muñoz has won the tournament on a record nine occasions, all with Real Madrid. Helenio Herrera and Johan Cruyff have each won the title on four occasions.

== Seasons and winning managers ==
Season	Country	Winning manager	Club	Ref.
1929	Spain	Romà Forns	Barcelona	
1929–30	England	Fred Pentland	Athletic Bilbao	
1930–31	England	Fred Pentland (2)	Athletic Bilbao	
1931–32	Hungary	Lippo Hertzka	Madrid FC	
1932–33	England	Robert Firth	Madrid FC	
1933–34	Spain	Patricio Caicedo	Athletic Bilbao	
1934–35	Ireland	Patrick O'Connell	Real Betis	
1935–36	England	William Garbutt	Athletic Bilbao	
1936–39	Cancelled due to Civil War			
1939–40	Spain	Ricardo Zamora	Atlético Aviación	
1940–41	Spain	Ricardo Zamora (2)	Atlético Aviación	
1941–42	Spain	Ramón Encinas	Valencia	
1942–43	Spain	Juan Urquizu	Athletic Bilbao	
1943–44	Spain	Eduardo Cubells	Valencia	
1944–45	Spain	Josep Samitier	Barcelona	
1945–46	Spain	Ramón Encinas (2)	Sevilla	
1946–47	Spain	Luis Pasarín	Valencia	
1947–48	Uruguay	Enrique Fernández	Barcelona	
1948–49	Uruguay	Enrique Fernández (2)	Barcelona	
1949–50	Argentina	Helenio Herrera	Atlético Madrid	
1950–51	Argentina	Helenio Herrera (2)	Atlético Madrid	
1951–52	Czechoslovakia	Ferdinand Daučík	Barcelona	
1952–53	Czechoslovakia	Ferdinand Daučík (2)	Barcelona	
1953–54	Uruguay	Enrique Fernández (3)	Real Madrid	
1954–55	Spain	José Villalonga	Real Madrid	
1955–56	Czechoslovakia	Ferdinand Daučík (3)	Athletic Bilbao	
1956–57	Spain	José Villalonga (2)	Real Madrid	
1957–58	Argentina	Luis Carniglia	Real Madrid	
1958–59	Argentina	Helenio Herrera (3)	Barcelona	
1959–60	Argentina	Helenio Herrera (4)	Barcelona	
1960–61	Spain	Miguel Muñoz	Real Madrid	
1961–62	Spain	Miguel Muñoz (2)	Real Madrid	
1962–63	Spain	Miguel Muñoz (3)	Real Madrid	
1963–64	Spain	Miguel Muñoz (4)	Real Madrid	
1964–65	Spain	Miguel Muñoz (5)	Real Madrid	
1965–66	Spain	Domènec Balmanya	Atlético Madrid	
1966–67	Spain	Miguel Muñoz (6)	Real Madrid	
1967–68	Spain	Miguel Muñoz (7)	Real Madrid	
1968–69	Spain	Miguel Muñoz (8)	Real Madrid	
1969–70	France	Marcel Domingo	Atlético Madrid	
1970–71	Argentina	Alfredo Di Stéfano	Valencia	
1971–72	Spain	Miguel Muñoz (9)	Real Madrid	
1972–73	Austria	Max Merkel	Atlético Madrid	
1973–74	Netherlands	Rinus Michels	Barcelona	
1974–75	Yugoslavia	Miljan Miljanić	Real Madrid	
1975–76	Yugoslavia	Miljan Miljanić (2)	Real Madrid	
1976–77	Spain	Luis Aragonés	Atlético Madrid	
1977–78	Spain	Luis Molowny	Real Madrid	
1978–79	Spain	Luis Molowny (2)	Real Madrid	
1979–80	Yugoslavia	Vujadin Boškov	Real Madrid	
1980–81	Spain	Alberto Ormaetxea	Real Sociedad	
1981–82	Spain	Alberto Ormaetxea (2)	Real Sociedad	
1982–83	Spain	Javier Clemente	Athletic Bilbao	
1983–84	Spain	Javier Clemente (2)	Athletic Bilbao	
1984–85	England	Terry Venables	Barcelona	
1985–86	Spain	Luis Molowny (3)	Real Madrid	
1986–87	Netherlands	Leo Beenhakker	Real Madrid	
1987–88	Netherlands	Leo Beenhakker (2)	Real Madrid	
1988–89	Netherlands	Leo Beenhakker (3)	Real Madrid	
1989–90	Wales	John Toshack	Real Madrid	
1990–91	Netherlands	Johan Cruyff	Barcelona	
1991–92	Netherlands	Johan Cruyff (2)	Barcelona	
1992–93	Netherlands	Johan Cruyff (3)	Barcelona	
1993–94	Netherlands	Johan Cruyff (4)	Barcelona	
1994–95	Argentina	Jorge Valdano	Real Madrid	
1995–96	FR Yugoslavia	Radomir Antić	Atlético Madrid	
1996–97	Italy	Fabio Capello	Real Madrid	
1997–98	Netherlands	Louis van Gaal	Barcelona	
1998–99	Netherlands	Louis van Gaal (2)	Barcelona	
1999–2000	Spain	Javier Irureta	Deportivo La Coruña	
2000–01	Spain	Vicente del Bosque	Real Madrid	
2001–02	Spain	Rafael Benítez	Valencia	
2002–03	Spain	Vicente del Bosque (2)	Real Madrid	
2003–04	Spain	Rafael Benítez (2)	Valencia	
2004–05	Netherlands	Frank Rijkaard	Barcelona	
2005–06	Netherlands	Frank Rijkaard (2)	Barcelona	
2006–07	Italy	Fabio Capello (2)	Real Madrid	
2007–08	Germany	Bernd Schuster	Real Madrid	
2008–09	Spain	Pep Guardiola	Barcelona	
2009–10	Spain	Pep Guardiola (2)	Barcelona	
2010–11	Spain	Pep Guardiola (3)	Barcelona	
2011–12	Portugal	José Mourinho	Real Madrid	
2012–13	Spain	Tito Vilanova	Barcelona	
2013–14	Argentina	Diego Simeone	Atlético Madrid	
2014–15	Spain	Luis Enrique	Barcelona	
2015–16	Spain	Luis Enrique (2)	Barcelona	
2016–17	France	Zinedine Zidane	Real Madrid	
2017–18	Spain	Ernesto Valverde	Barcelona	
2018–19	Spain	Ernesto Valverde (2)	Barcelona	
2019–20	France	Zinedine Zidane (2)	Real Madrid	
2020–21	Argentina	Diego Simeone (2)	Atlético Madrid	
2021–22	Italy	Carlo Ancelotti	Real Madrid	
2022–23	Spain	Xavi	Barcelona	
2023–24	Italy	Carlo Ancelotti (2)	Real Madrid	
2024–25	Germany	Hansi Flick	Barcelona	
2025–26	Germany	Hansi Flick (2)	Barcelona	

== By individual ==
Rank	Manager	Wins	Club(s)	Winning seasons
1	(Spain) Miguel Muñoz	9	Real Madrid	1960–61, 1961–62, 1962–63, 1963–64, 1964–65, 1966–67, 1967–68, 1968–69, 1971–72
2	(Uruguay) Enrique Fernández	4	Barcelona, Real Madrid	1947–48, 1948–49, 1953–54, 1954–55
2	(Argentina) Helenio Herrera	4	Atlético Madrid, Barcelona	1949–50, 1950–51, 1958–59, 1959–60
2	(Netherlands) Johan Cruyff	4	Barcelona	1990–91, 1991–92, 1992–93, 1993–94
5	(Czechoslovakia) Ferdinand Daučík	3	Barcelona, Athletic Bilbao	1951–52, 1952–53, 1955–56
5	(Spain) Luis Molowny	3	Real Madrid	1977–78, 1978–79, 1985–86
5	(Netherlands) Leo Beenhakker	3	Real Madrid	1986–87, 1987–88, 1988–89
5	(Spain) Pep Guardiola	3	Barcelona	2008–09, 2009–10, 2010–11
9	(England) Fred Pentland	2	Athletic Bilbao	1929–30, 1930–31
9	(Spain) Ricardo Zamora	2	Atlético Aviación	1939–40, 1940–41
9	(Spain) Ramón Encinas	2	Valencia, Sevilla	1941–42, 1945–46
9	(Spain) José Villalonga	2	Real Madrid	1954–55, 1956–57
9	(Socialist Federal Republic of Yugoslavia) Miljan Miljanić	2	Real Madrid	1974–75, 1975–76
9	(Spain) Alberto Ormaetxea	2	Real Sociedad	1980–81, 1981–82
9	(Spain) Javier Clemente	2	Athletic Bilbao	1982–83, 1983–84
9	(Netherlands) Louis van Gaal	2	Barcelona	1997–98, 1998–99
9	(Spain) Vicente del Bosque	2	Real Madrid	2000–01, 2002–03
9	(Spain) Rafael Benítez	2	Valencia	2001–02, 2003–04
9	(Netherlands) Frank Rijkaard	2	Barcelona	2004–05, 2005–06
9	(Italy) Fabio Capello	2	Real Madrid	1996–97, 2006–07
9	(Spain) Luis Enrique	2	Barcelona	2014–15, 2015–16
9	(Spain) Ernesto Valverde	2	Barcelona	2017–18, 2018–19
9	(France) Zinedine Zidane	2	Real Madrid	2016–17, 2019–20
9	(Argentina) Diego Simeone	2	Atlético Madrid	2013–14, 2020–21
9	(Italy) Carlo Ancelotti	2	Real Madrid	2021–22, 2023–24
9	(Germany) Hansi Flick	2	Barcelona	2024–25, 2025–26

== By nationality ==
La Liga winning managers by nationality
Country	Managers	Total
Spain	24	45
Netherlands	5	12
Argentina	5	8
England	4	6
Italy	2	4
France	2	3
Germany	2	3
Yugoslavia	2	3
Uruguay	1	4
Czechoslovakia	1	3
Hungary	1	1
Ireland	1	1
Austria	1	1
Wales	1	1
Serbia and Montenegro	1	1
Portugal	1	1
