= Football in Saba =

Association football is a popular sport on the Caribbean island of Saba.

== Saba United Sports Federation ==
Sports on the island are controlled by the Saba United Sports Federation and the Commission of Social Affairs, Culture and Sports.

== Facilities ==
The Cruyff Court Saba in The Bottom is the only football facility on the island. The artificial turf stadium was opened in April 2011.

== Youth football ==
In 1999 local resident Lynne Johnson began organising football lessons for young boys at the Man-O-War Ground (now the Cruyff Court Saba). There are youth football activities for males and females on the island. In May 2019 new Sports Facilitator of Saba Joelyn Robinson stated a desire to revive youth sports, including soccer.

== School teams ==
The Saba University School of Medicine has student-run intramural football activities. The Saba Comprehensive School has also been instrumental in organising notable football programs, including an international tournament hosted by Saba in May to June 2019.

== League ==
Unlike the other islands of the Dutch Caribbean, no organised senior football league has ever been played on Saba. An inter-island competition was staged between Saba and Sint Eustatius from 2004 to 2006, but was then dissolved. In July 2021 Saba signed a memorandum of understanding with Sint Eustatius to, "undertake joint initiatives such as enhancing the sports structure and related activities, organizing regional sporting tournaments and competitions...". However, football was not specifically mentioned.

== National team ==
Formerly Saba was represented in international football by the Netherlands Antilles national football team until the country was dissolved on 10 October 2010 and Saba became a separate Special Municipality. Since that time there has been limited activity by a distinct Saba national football team, other than a series of matches against the Sint Eustatius national football team which were played until at least 2011. The national football team of Bonaire, another island that holds the status of special municipality within the Netherlands proper, has been a member of the CFU and CONCACAF since 2013 through the support of the Dutch KNVB, leaving open the possibility for Saba membership in the governing bodies. Those associated with football in Saba have been working with the KNVB since at least 2019 when the association provided equipment to the island. In August 2021 the KNVB, joined by Bert Zuurman and former Aruba national team coach Elvis Albertus, organised a football course and coaching clinic on the island.

The girls' team of the Saba Comprehensive School competed against an Anguilla selection in a tournament at home in summer 2019. The Saba team also defeated a Sint Maarten selection to win the championship. The top male scorer in the tournament was Khalid Tavernier who is a Sint Maarten youth international. March 2026 brought the "debut" of the women's national team with 3 matches against clubs from Sint Maarten.

=== List of men's international matches ===
As of 6 May 2011.

Date	Home	Away	Score
2004	Sint Eustatius	Saba	3–1
15 July 2006	Saba	Sint Eustatius	3–5
16 July 2006	Saba	Sint Eustatius	5–5
20 June 2009	Sint Eustatius	Saba	Unknown
21 June 2009	Sint Eustatius	Saba	Unknown
27 March 2010	Saba	Sint Eustatius	2–1
28 March 2010	Saba	Sint Eustatius	1–2
28 March 2010	Saba	Sint Eustatius	2–2
6 May 2011	Sint Eustatius U23	Saba	2–1
