= The Bottom =

Village in Saba, Dutch Caribbean

- Capital city
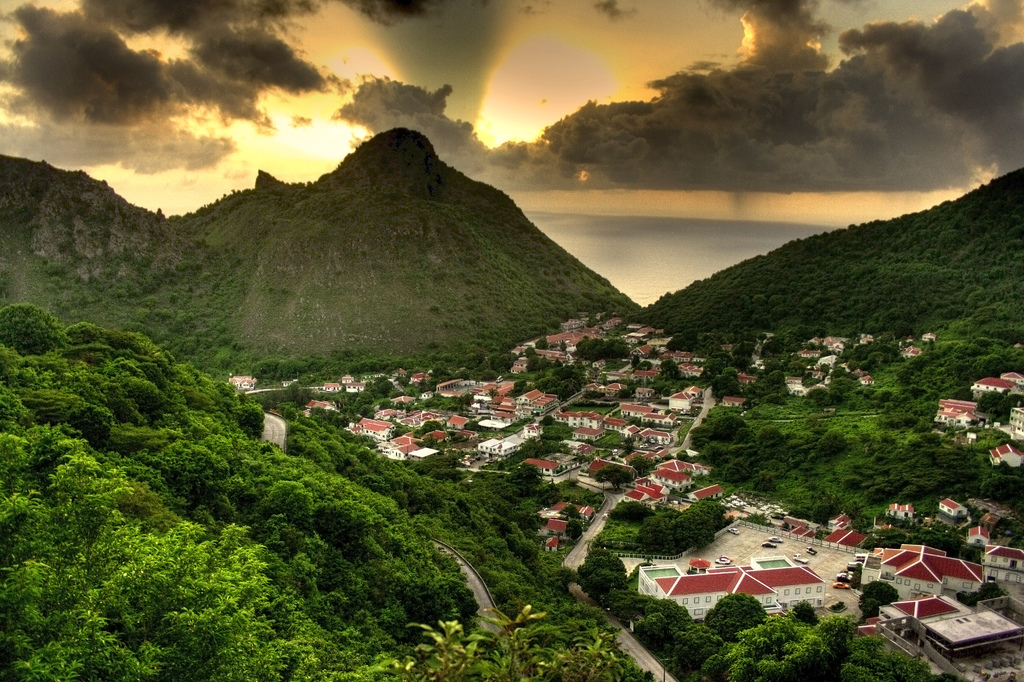
- The Bottom, with the campus of the School of Medicine at the bottom right

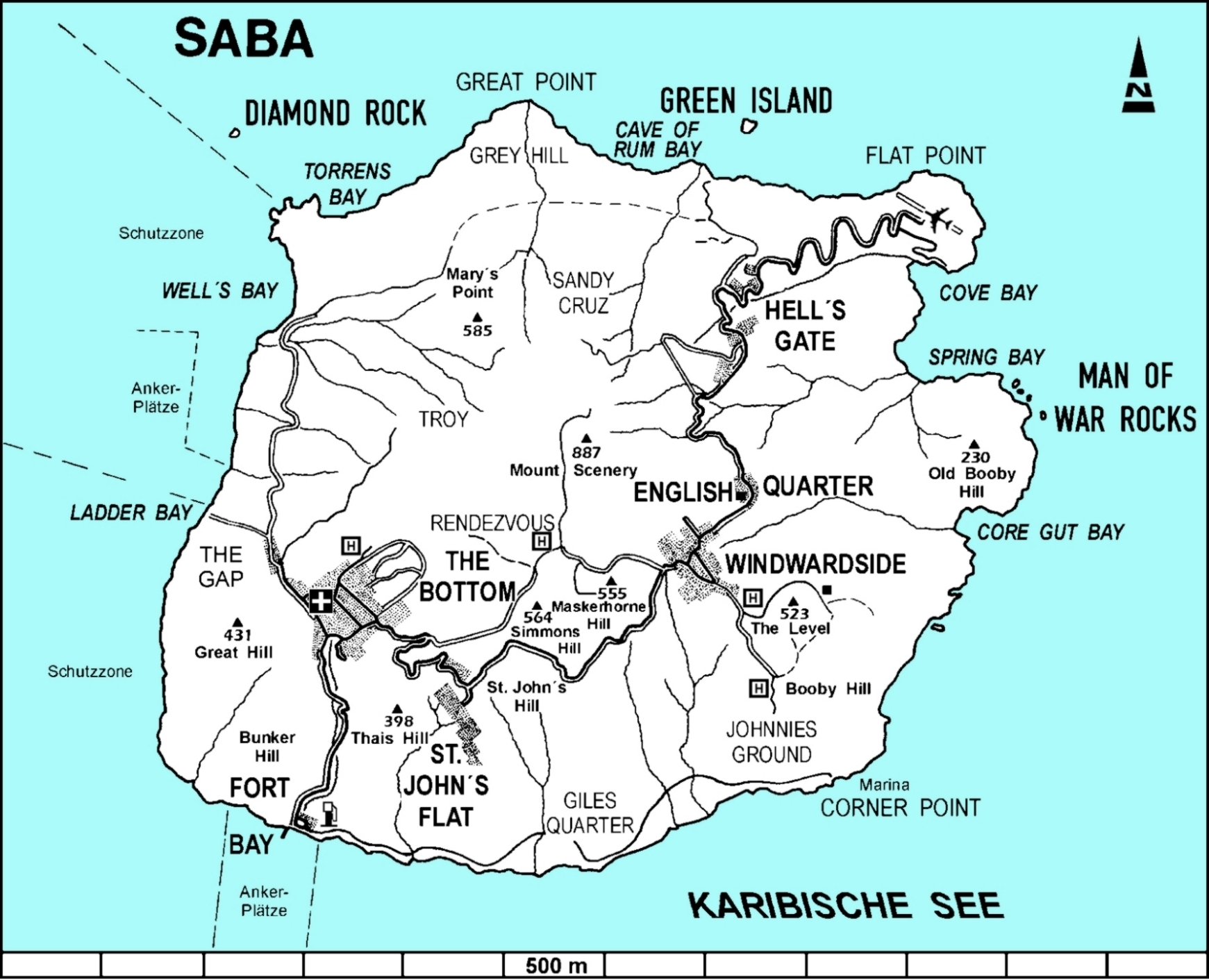
- Map of Saba showing The Bottom

- Location within Saba Location within North America
- Coordinates: 17°37′34″N 63°14′57″W
- Country: Netherlands
- Public body: Saba

Population
  - Total: 462
- Time zone: UTC-4 (AST)
- Climate: Aw

The Bottom (formerly Botte) is the capital and largest town of the island of Saba, the Caribbean Netherlands. It is the first stop on the way from Saba's Port in Fort Bay towards the rest of the island. In 2001, it had 462 inhabitants of the total 1,349 islanders. It is the administrative center of Saba.

== History ==
The first European settlements occurred around 1640, by colonists from Zeeland. After a landslide destroyed their original settlement, these settlers established a village in The Bottom. The original name of the village was De Botte, old Dutch for "The Bowl", referring to its geographical position in a valley surrounded by the various mountains. "The Bottom" is an English corruption of this name. After the Dutch settlers, Irish, English, and Scottish settlers followed, along with enslaved Africans, and the main language of the island's villages became English.

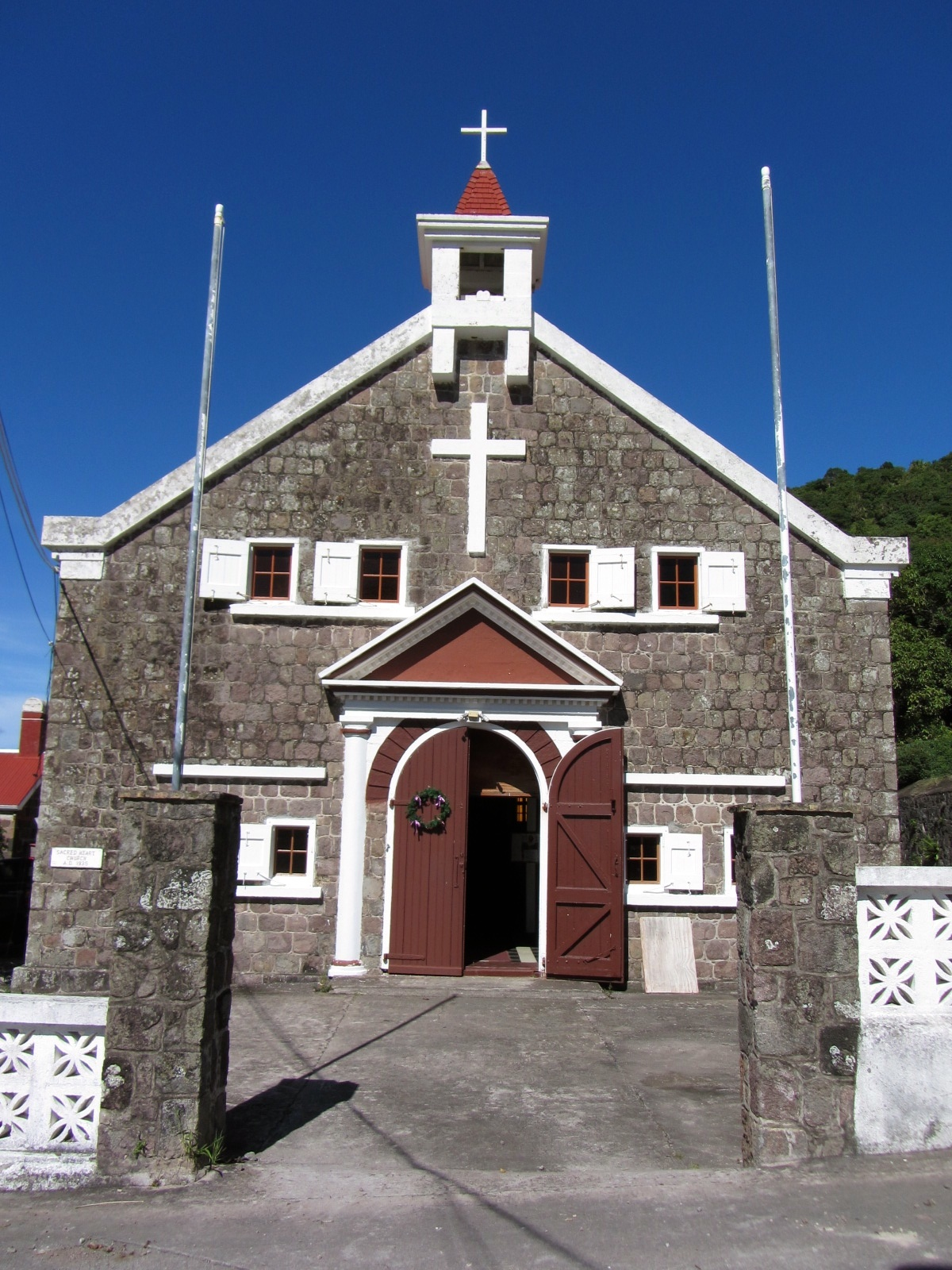
Sacred Heart Catholic Church

By the 1860s, The Bottom was one of 7 main districts, with St. John's, Windwardside, Booby Hill, Mary's Point (Palmetto Point), Hell's Gate, and Middle Island. The Bottom district had its own elected head, as did the other districts. In 1865, the population of The Bottom was 616 inhabitants. In 1877, construction of Sacred Heart Catholic Church began in The Bottom; the church is still operational today, although the building was replaced in 1909 and again in 1934.

Throughout the 18th, 19th, and early 20th centuries, most men in The Bottom engaged in farming or fishing. They also engaged in shipbuilding, which was one of Saba's industries in the 19th century. Most women engaged in domestic work in the home, as well as hatmaking and local drawn thread work known as Saba lace.

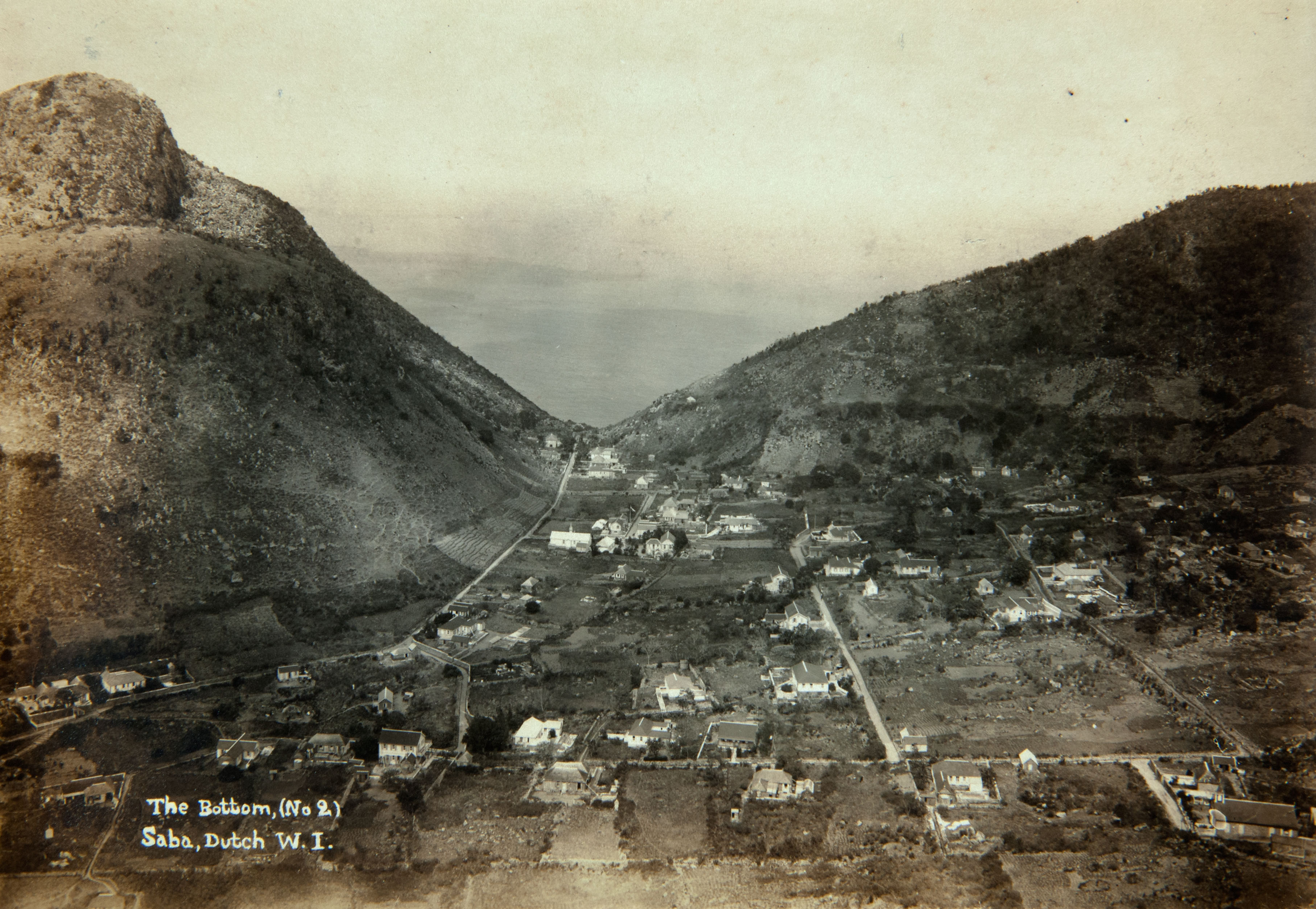
Image of The Bottom circa 1911

By 1900, The Bottom was one of four main villages on Saba, along with St. John's, Windwardside, and Hell's Gate. In 1909, a navigation school opened in The Bottom; it operated until 1922. In 1919, construction began on the Weselyan Holiness Church in The Bottom; the church is still operational today. In 1923, Queen Wilhemina Library opened in The Bottom; the library is still operational today. Saba's first movie theater opened in 1953, and its second in 1964.

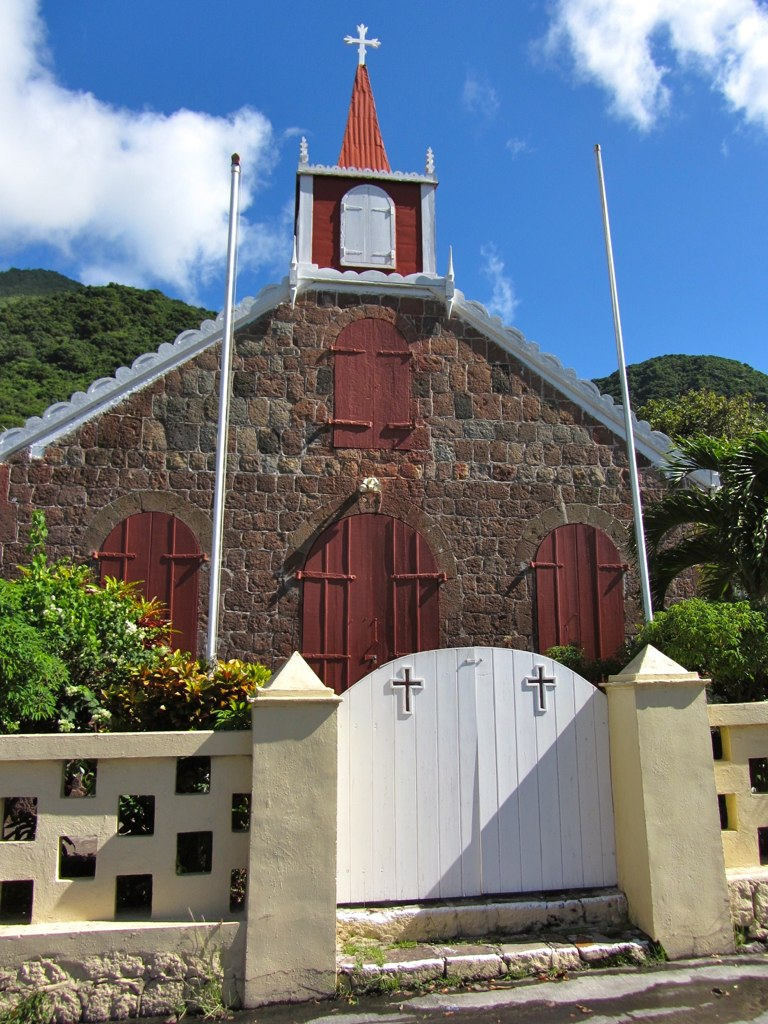
Wesleyan Holiness Church

In the early-to-mid-20th century, there was extensive emigration from Saba, and The Bottom's population was cut almost in half. By 1972, the population of The Bottom had decreased to 341 inhabitants.

In the mid-to-late-20th century, there was economic development on Saba, and especially in The Bottom and Windwardside. The first supermarket opened in The Bottom in 1964. In 1992, the Saba University School of Medicine opened in The Bottom.

== Infrastructure ==
The Bottom is home to the government offices, a hospital, a nursing home, Juliana Sports Field, three churches, a library, the Queen's Hotel resort, and various shops, restaurants, and bars. The Bottom is also the location of the Saba University School of Medicine.

The city also has the largest Cruyff Court in the world, Cruyff Court Saba.

== Events ==
As capital of the island, The Bottom hosts a number of events throughout the year.

During the summer, the island's Carnival celebration (called Saba Carnival or Saba Summer Festival) takes place. Usually in late July, Saba Carnival is a weeklong festival that includes live music, food, dancing, games, and parades. Carnival Village, where the majority of the events take place, is located in The Bottom. Each night during the week, there is live music at Carnival Village. The jourvert parade (very early Saturday morning) begins in Windwardside and ends in The Bottom. The Grand Parade and the Second Parade take place in The Bottom on Saturday and Sunday. Locals and tourists congregate in The Bottom for the parades, which include energetic music, colorful floats, and troupes wearing colorful costumes.

Another event held in The Bottom is Saba Day. This is the celebratory national day of the island, when all offices, schools and businesses are closed. The islanders honour their diversity and culture through various activities, performances and parades. The Bottom hosts a concert at the sports field, where local (and neighbouring) Caribbean artists come to perform. There are fishing competitions at sea, drawing competitions for children, dance performances, cookouts, and more.

== Hiking ==
The Bottom is the location of many trailheads.

- The Ladder consists of 800 steps leading down to the sea. The trail starts in The Bottom between the hospital and Wells Bay. These stairs were used to bring cargo ashore and up to The Bottom. The trail takes approximately 1 hour round trip.
- The Sandy Cruz Trail can begin in The Bottom near the Queen's Hotel, and end in Hell's Gate. The trail has views of Diamond Rock and the northern coastline. It takes roughly 2.5 hours to complete if begun in The Bottom, and 2 if begun in Hell's Gate.
- The Crispeen Track (or Crispeen Trail) can begin on the Mt. Scenery trail and leads down into The Bottom. The trail goes through secondary rainforest, and has overhead views of The Bottom. The trail takes approximately 1-1.5 hours one-way.
- The Bottom Mountain Trail can begin in The Bottom near the Queen's Hotel, or the junction at Rendezvous on the Mt. Scenery trail. The trail goes through mostly dry forest and some rainforest, and has overhead views of The Bottom.
- Tara Ground Trail can begin on the Bottom Mountain Trail or Crispeen Track. The Trail goes through secondary forest and passes by ruins of old farmland. The hike takes about 45 minutes (from the Bottom Mountain trail junction to the Crispeen Track junction).
- Buds Mountain Loop is an alternate way to go up or down Mount Scenery. It connects to Bottom Mountain Trail. It goes through secondary rainforest, as well as rainforest near the top. It takes 1.5 hours uphill.
- Parish Hill Trail can begin in two different locations in The Bottom, either behind the hospital or at the beginning of the road that leads down to Fort Bay from The Bottom. The trail goes up to the top of Parish Hill, which is a volcanic dome. The hike takes about 1.5 hours.

== Climate ==
The climate is a drier variation of a tropical savanna climate (Aw/As), narrowly missing a hot semi arid climate (BSh), with rainfall spread out irregularly throughout the year.

Climate data for The Bottom, Saba (1971–2000)
Month	Jan	Feb	Mar	Apr	May	Jun	Jul	Aug	Sep	Oct	Nov	Dec	Year
Record high °C (°F)	30.4 (86.7)	30.8 (87.4)	30.7 (87.3)	31.7 (89.1)	31.9 (89.4)	32.5 (90.5)	32.8 (91.0)	33.2 (91.8)	33.2 (91.8)	32.1 (89.8)	32.0 (89.6)	31.1 (88.0)	33.2 (91.8)
Mean daily maximum °C (°F)	28.1 (82.6)	27.7 (81.9)	28.3 (82.9)	29.2 (84.6)	30.0 (86.0)	30.4 (86.7)	30.5 (86.9)	30.9 (87.6)	30.8 (87.4)	30.4 (86.7)	29.8 (85.6)	28.6 (83.5)	29.6 (85.3)
Daily mean °C (°F)	25.7 (78.3)	25.3 (77.5)	25.7 (78.3)	26.6 (79.9)	27.4 (81.3)	28.1 (82.6)	28.1 (82.6)	28.5 (83.3)	28.5 (83.3)	28.2 (82.8)	27.4 (81.3)	26.3 (79.3)	27.2 (81.0)
Mean daily minimum °C (°F)	24.1 (75.4)	23.6 (74.5)	23.9 (75.0)	24.7 (76.5)	25.6 (78.1)	26.2 (79.2)	26.0 (78.8)	26.4 (79.5)	26.5 (79.7)	26.3 (79.3)	25.4 (77.7)	24.7 (76.5)	25.3 (77.5)
Record low °C (°F)	20.8 (69.4)	20.0 (68.0)	21.4 (70.5)	22.1 (71.8)	22.6 (72.7)	23.1 (73.6)	21.8 (71.2)	22.0 (71.6)	22.4 (72.3)	22.4 (72.3)	22.6 (72.7)	21.3 (70.3)	20.0 (68.0)
Average rainfall mm (inches)	36.8 (1.45)	75.3 (2.96)	35.4 (1.39)	28.1 (1.11)	95.9 (3.78)	44.4 (1.75)	60.8 (2.39)	77.0 (3.03)	60.5 (2.38)	35.5 (1.40)	134.5 (5.30)	76.5 (3.01)	760.5 (29.94)
Average rainy days (≥ 1.0 mm)	10.3	10.3	6.3	4.0	6.7	5.8	5.8	6.3	7.3	3.5	10.0	9.7	86.0
Average relative humidity (%)	82.0	82.3	78.2	78.8	78.0	81.9	84.5	88.8	87.4	81.2	71.1	74.5	80.7
Source: Meteorological Department Curaçao

== Gallery ==
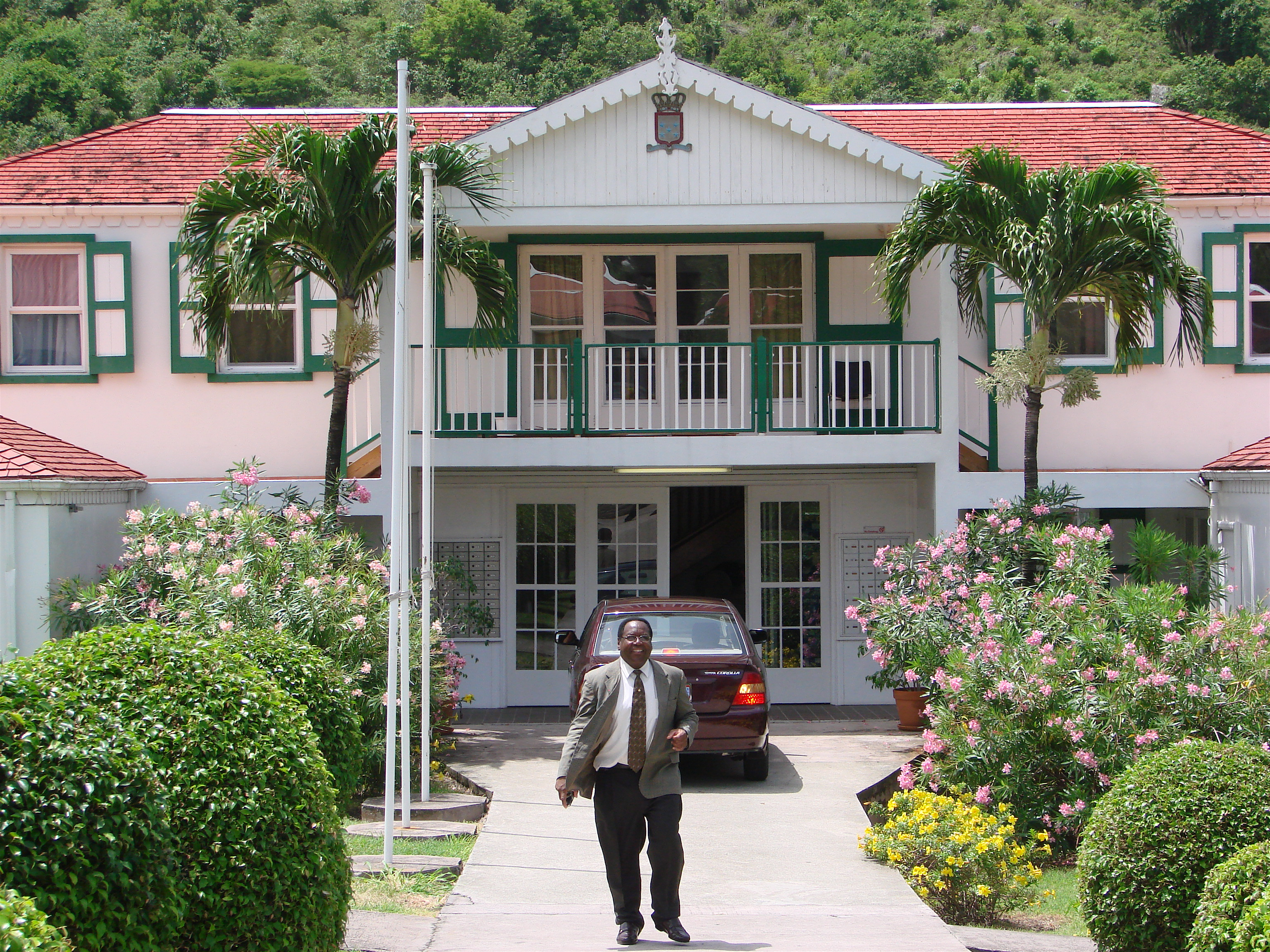
Saba's Government House

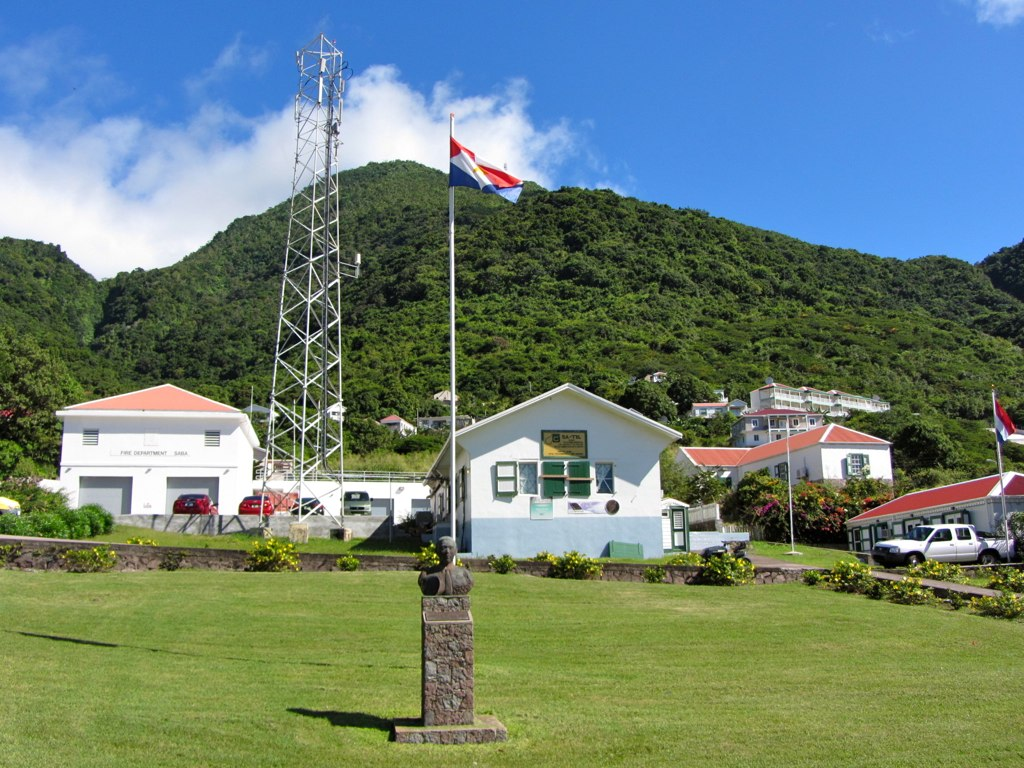
Saba's Central Park with Fire Department

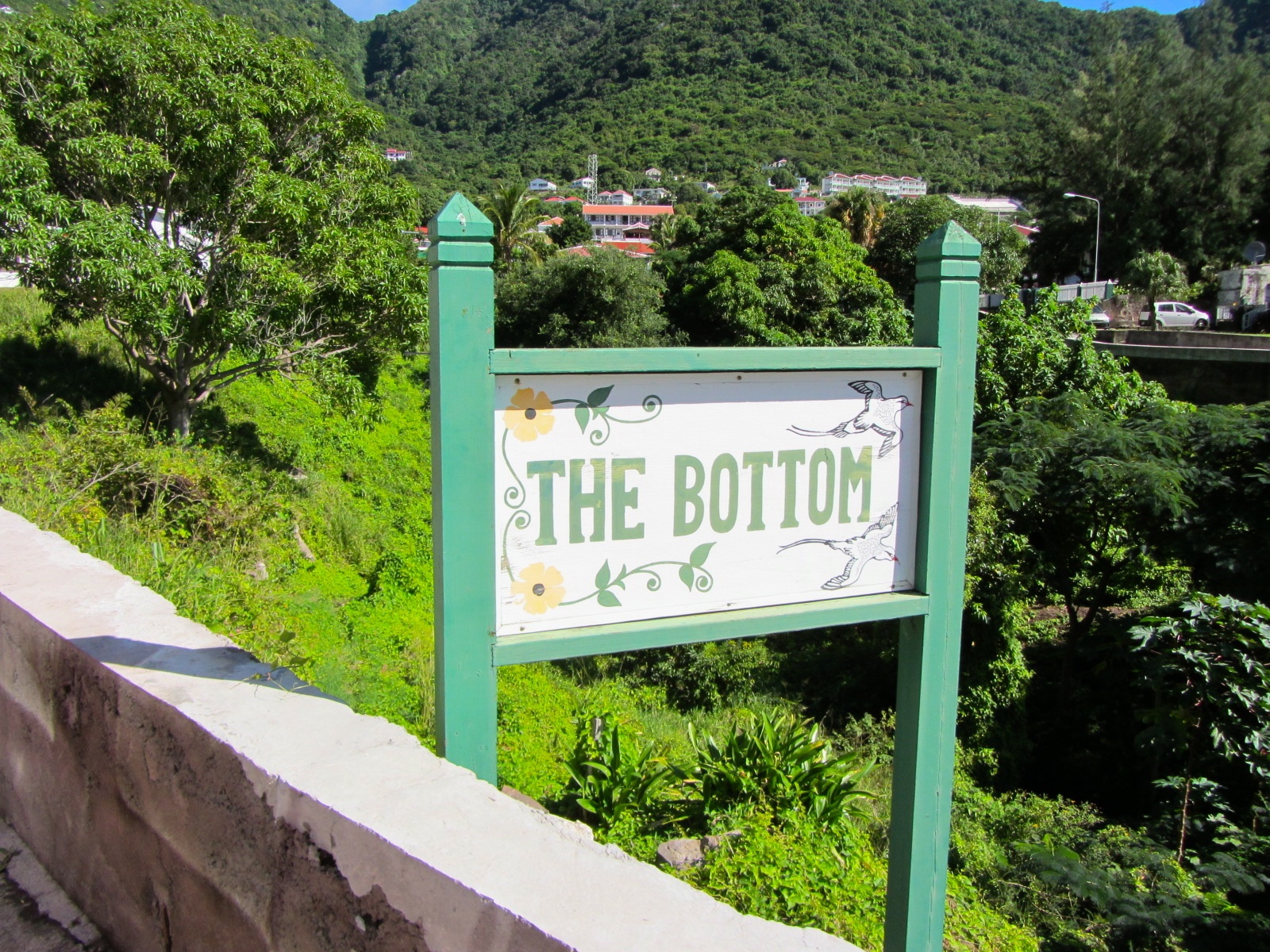
The Bottom's signboard

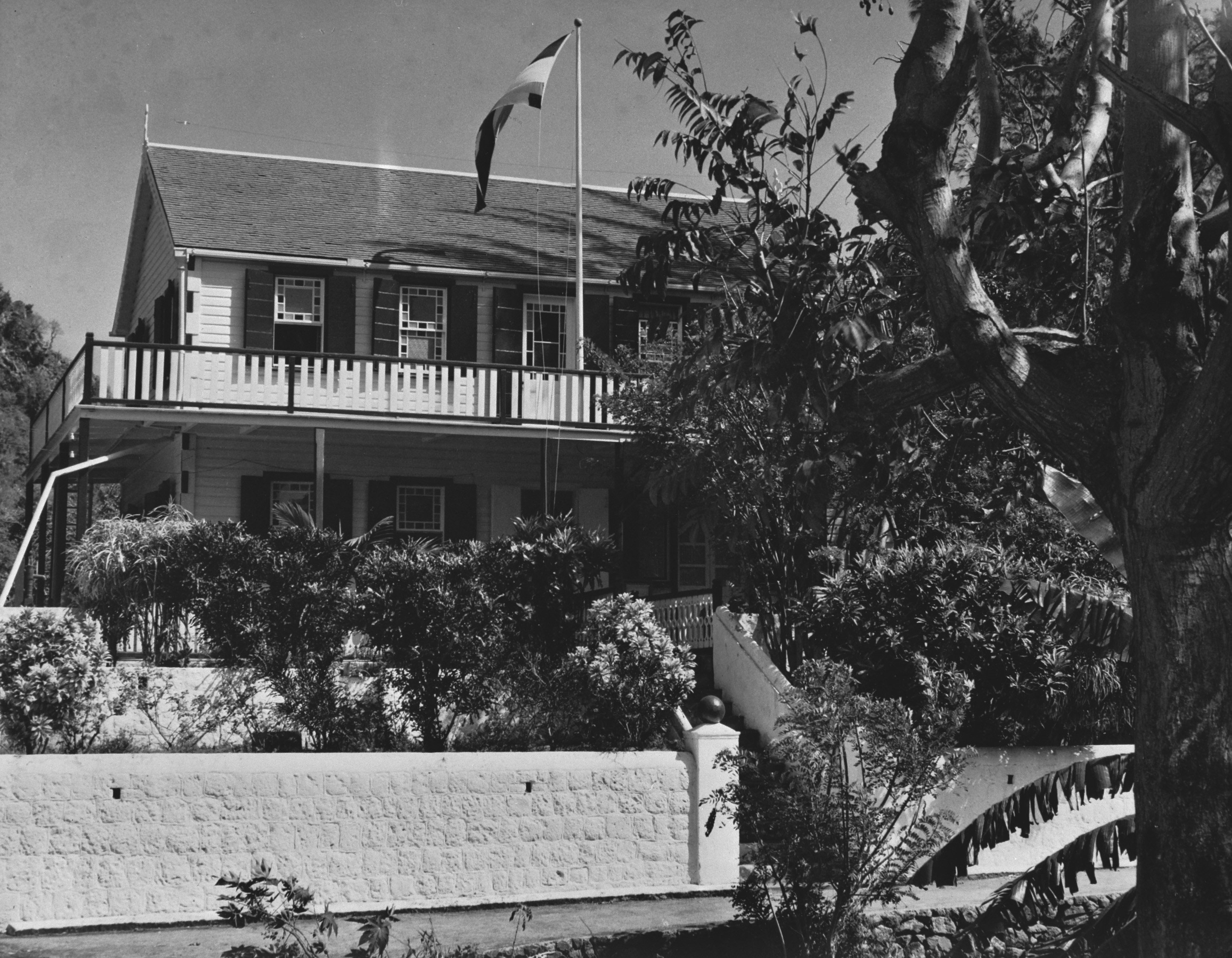
The Governor's residence

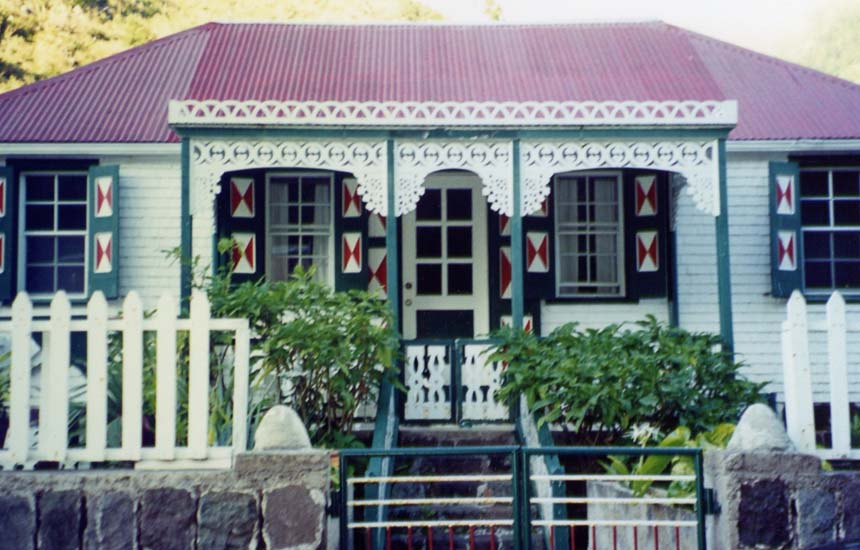
Traditional Saban cottage in The Bottom

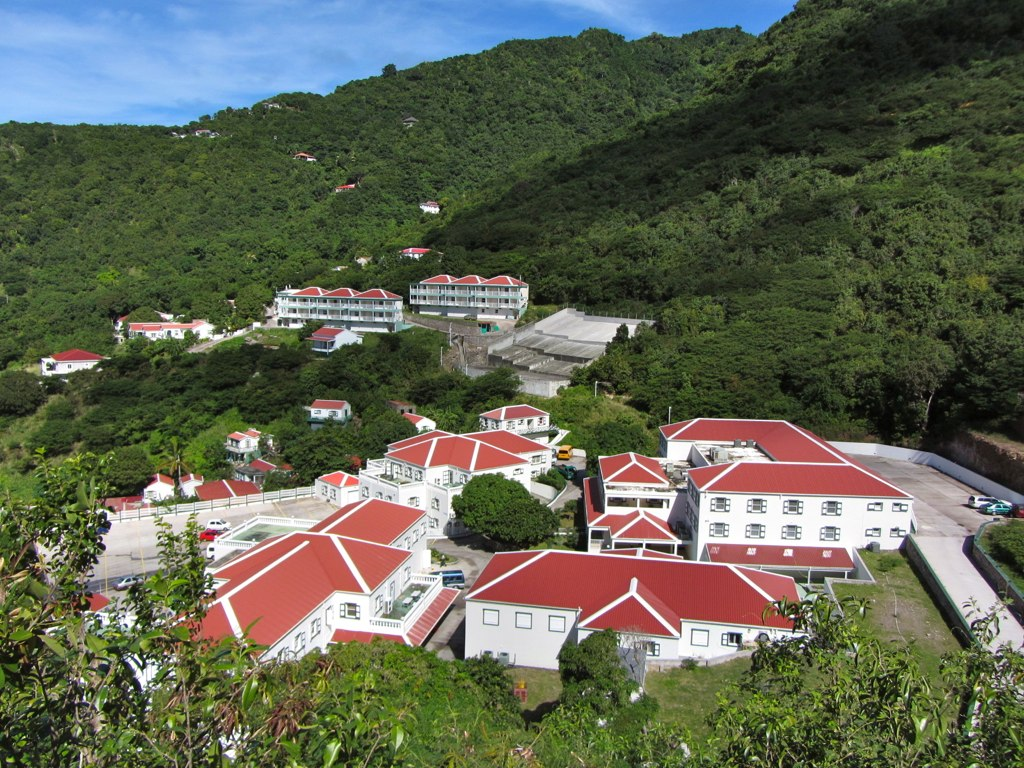
Saba University School of Medicine buildings

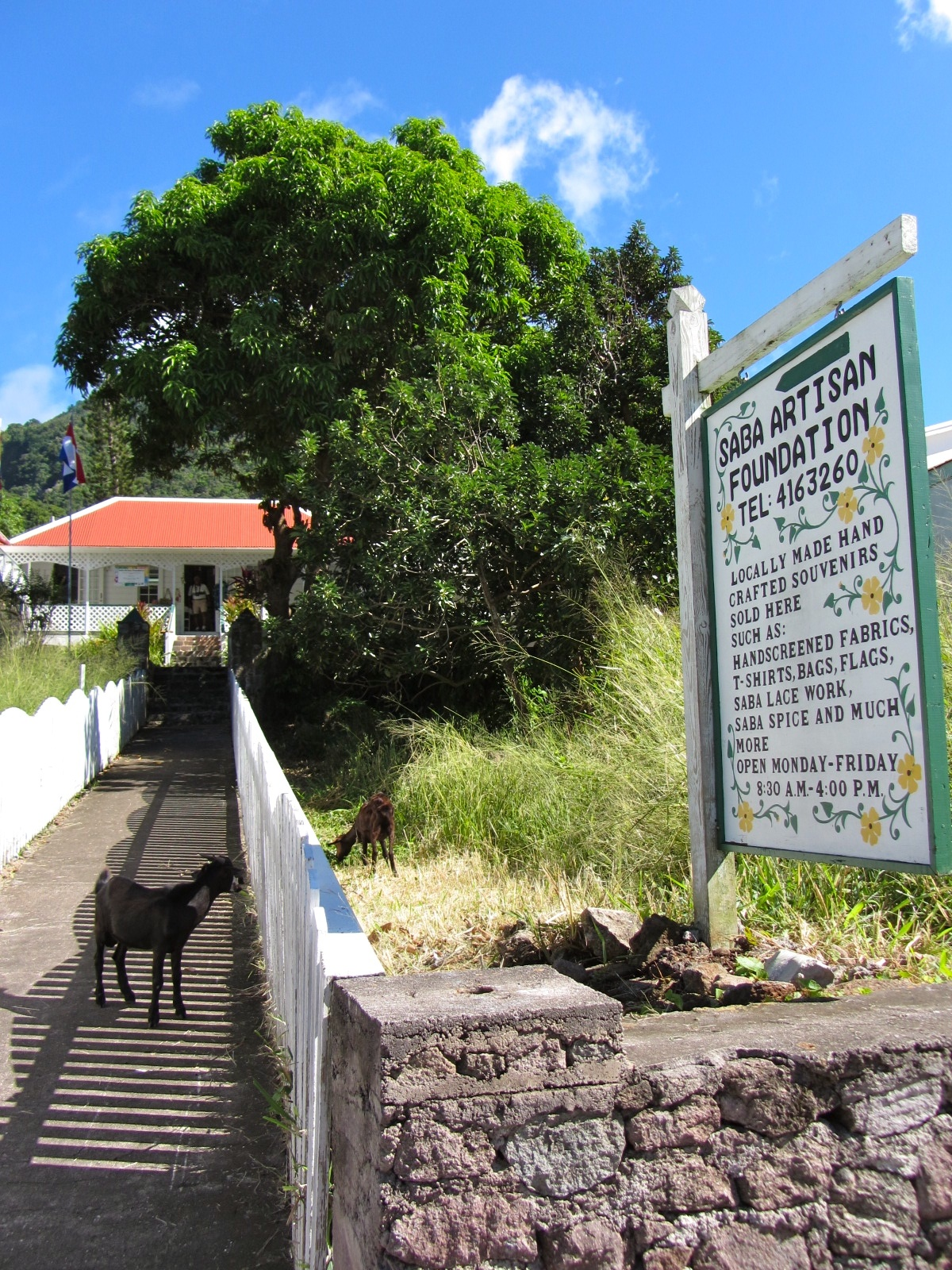
Saba Artisan Foundation entrance

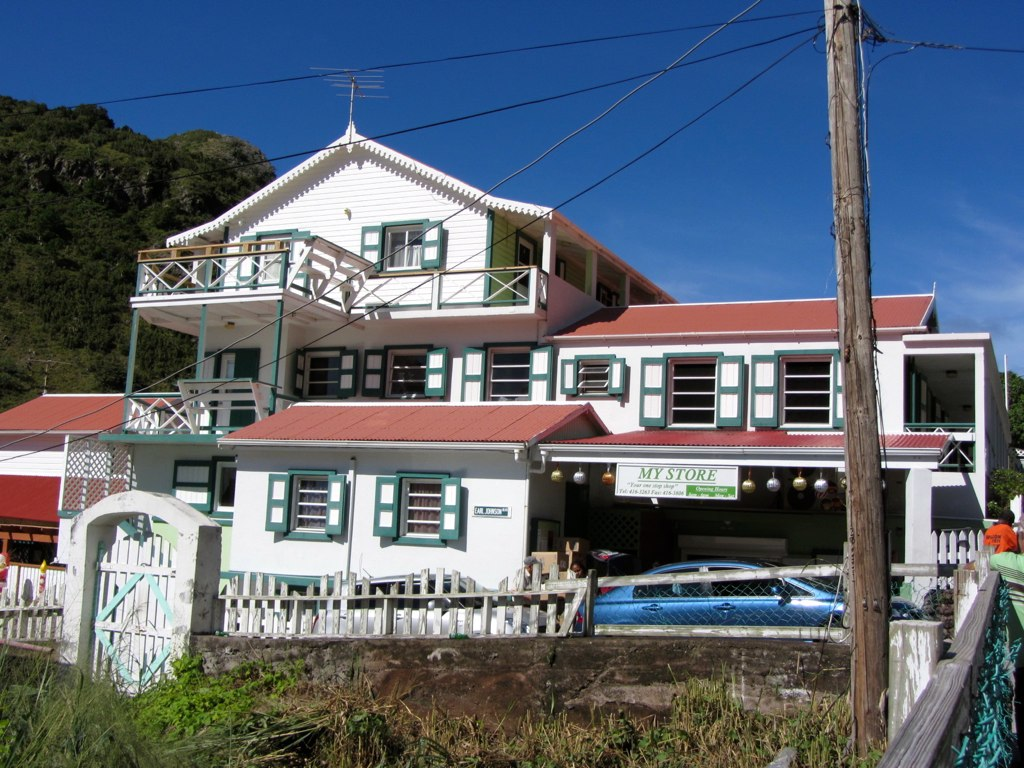
Grocery Store in The Bottom

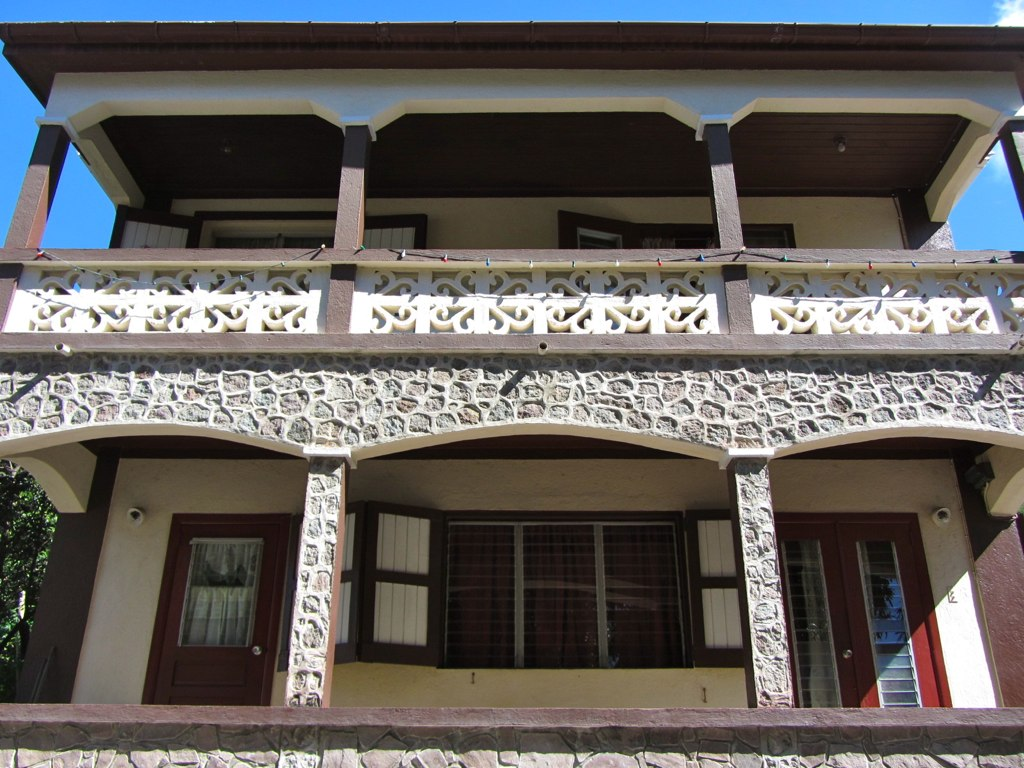
Building in The Bottom

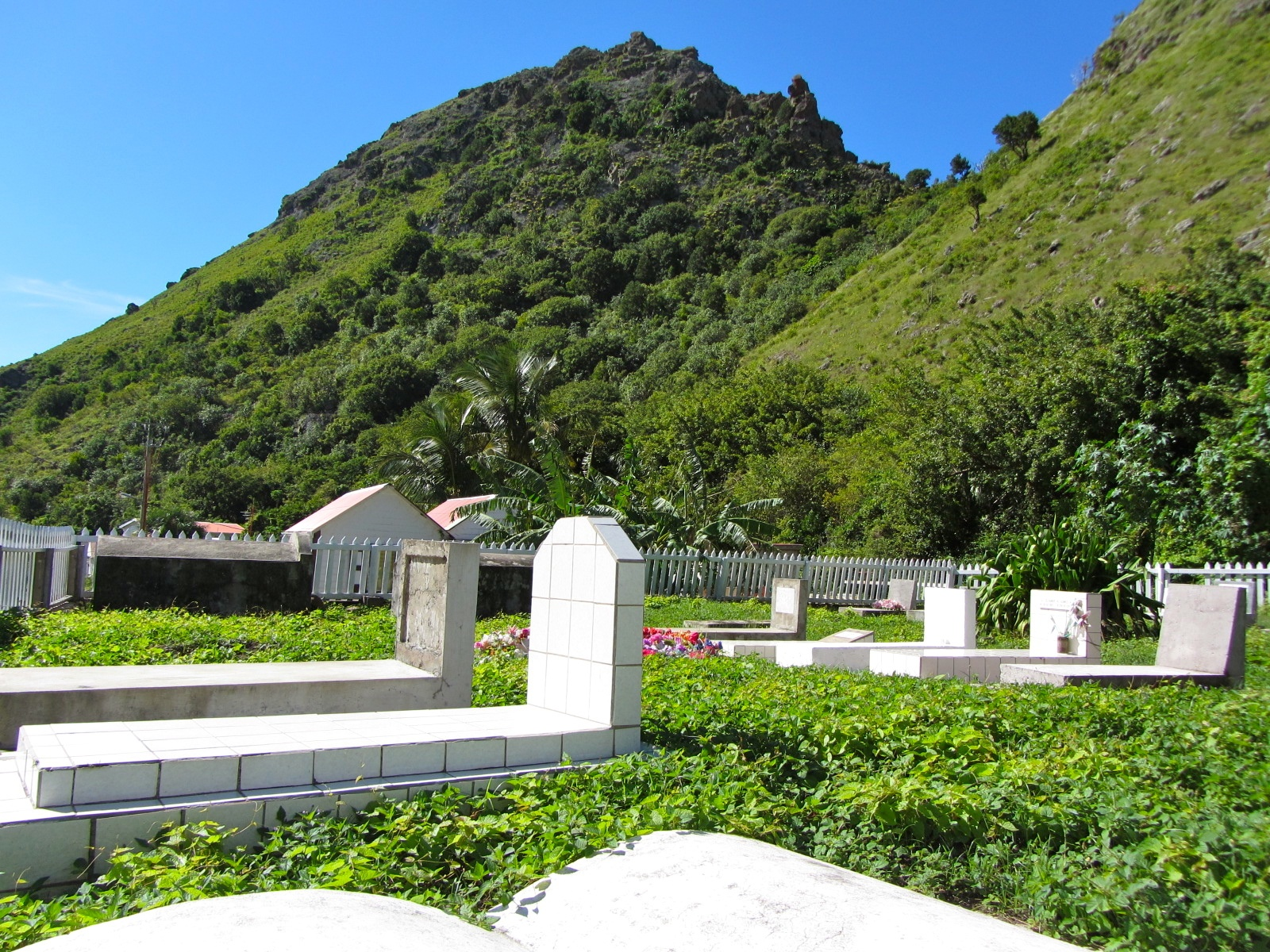
Raised cemetery in The Bottom
