= Bert Zuurman =

Dutch footballer (born 1973)

Personal information
- Date of birth: 16 March 1973 (age 53)
- Place of birth: Winschoten, Netherlands
- Height: 1.78 m (5 ft 10 in)
- Position: Striker

Senior career*
Years	Team	Apps	(Gls)
1990–1993	Groningen	18	(2)
1993	→ Heracles (loan)	15	(4)
1993–1996	Heerenveen	8	(0)
1994–1995	→ Veendam (loan)	43	(16)
1996–1998	Veendam	58	(18)
1998–2000	Eindhoven	49	(23)
2000	→ Emmen (loan)	11	(2)
2000–2001	Emmen	23	(7)
2001–2005	Zwolle	81	(11)
2005–2006	TOP Oss	25	(0)

Managerial career
- 2010–2013: Zwolle (women)
- 2016–2017: Ozone
- 2018–2019: Rainbow AC
- * Club domestic league appearances and goals

Bert Zuurman (born 16 March 1973) is a Dutch former football striker, who made his professional debut in the 1990–91 season for FC Groningen. Later on he played for Heracles Almelo, SC Heerenveen, BV Veendam, FC Eindhoven, FC Emmen, FC Zwolle, and TOP Oss.

== Career ==
Born in Winschoten, Groningen, Zuurman played professional football with SC Heerenveen, before spending four seasons with FC Zwolle. Zuurman is a former U19 national player of The Netherlands. Zuurman holds a UEFA 'A' Licence.

After retiring from playing football, Zuurman became a manager and was appointed coach of FC Zwolle's women's team in 2010.

Zuurman is now in India and is the coach of the Ozone Football Academy in Bangalore, India. Zuurman is the Head coach and Technical Director of Ozone FC, Bengaluru. OzoneFA, Bangalore runs a residential football academy and also their professional team, Ozone Football Club (Ozone FC, Bengaluru) now trains at the Bangalore Football Stadium; a stadium owned by the Karnataka State Football Association. Incidentally, the stadium also houses one of the four centres funded by the FIFA for the growth of youth football in India. The other centres are in Goa, West Bengal and Navi Mumbai.

== Managerial statistics ==
As of 3 November 2018

Team	From	To	Record				
Team	From	To	G	W	D	L	Win %
(India) Ozone	2016	2017	6	3	1	2	50.00
Total			6	3	1	2	50.00

== Honours ==
FC Zwolle

- Eerste Divisie: 2001–02
