= Cruyff Court =

Type of football field in the Netherlands

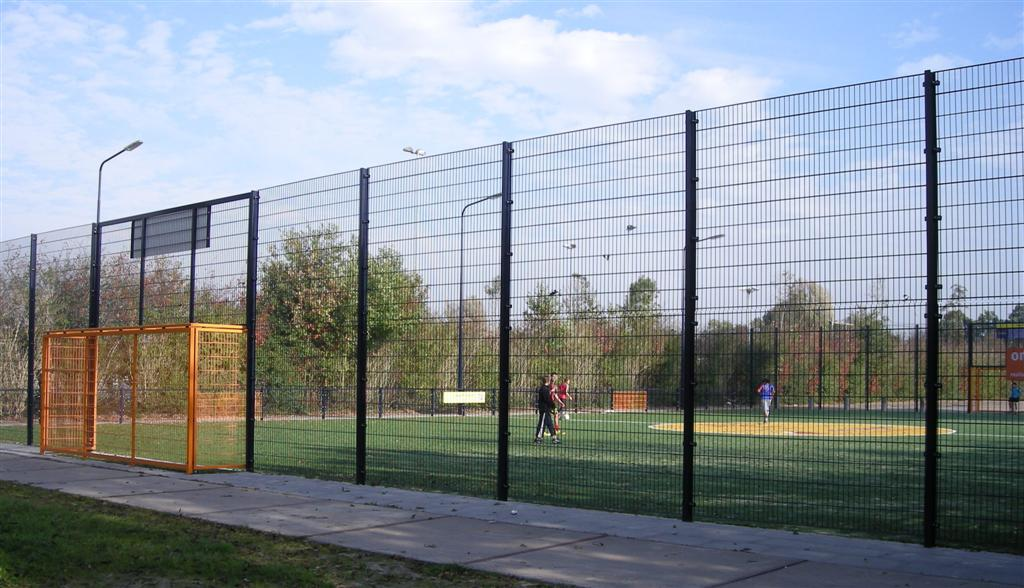
Cruyff Court in the De Greiden neighborhood of Heerenveen

A Cruyff Court is a small football field with a surface made of artificial grass, a contemporary version of the ball court. The Courts are a project of the Johan Cruyff Foundation of which Johan Cruijff himself was one of the founders. The first was the Cruyff Court Aron Winter Veld in Lelystad. Since 2003, the Dutch football Talent of the Year may choose a location for a new court.

Although the Foundation primarily focuses on football, it encourages the use of Cruyff Courts for other sports and recreational activities as well. Standard Cruyff Courts are intended to serve as neighborhood facilities, and applications for new courts must demonstrate how the project will be integrated into the local community.

This emphasis on community integration also applies, where possible, to adapted Cruyff Courts. These accessible courts are developed in consultation with organizations that support children and young people with a disability.

== Characteristics ==
A Cruyff Court is typically placed in Dutch neighborhoods with a commitment to sport and recreation. The field is typically 42×28 meters, much smaller than a regular size football field. As a comparison, the penalty area of a UEFA Champions League pitch is 40×16,5 meters. Both in width and length a regular size pitch is 2,5 times larger and 6x the size in surface. The courts are green, except for the circle in the middle, which is dark yellow and purple and the orange CCKV logo. The goals are orange and the fences are blue.

The Johan Cruyff Foundation considers community integration to be an essential aspect of its courts. For this reason, benches must be installed along the edge of the playing field, and local residents must be consulted about the installation of fencing. In addition, the Foundation places great importance on community support and local involvement, which are assessed through a checklist that municipalities must complete when applying for a court.

The checklist includes questions about the characteristics of the neighborhood, the level of supervision, the proximity of schools, the cultural diversity of the area, the availability of other sports facilities, and whether the neighborhood experiences socioeconomic disadvantage. The first question on the checklist is: Is the proposed location in the center of the neighborhood?

== History ==
In 2003 the first Cruyff Courts were constructed and at the end of 2007; there were 70. In 2016 there are 208 of which 35 abroad and 33 locally. Countries outside the Netherlands with a Cruyff Court include Belgium, Spain, Poland, Great Britain, Morocco, the United States and Japan.

== Special fields ==
=== Madurodam ===
The 'Madurodam Field' 'in The Hague is unique, not only because there is a miniature version of it, but also because it is combined with the playground of Richard Krajicek, realized by the Richard Krajicek Foundation. It is part of a sports complex, and schools in the area take part in the activities.

=== Youth with disabilities ===
Among the 208 Cruyff Courts are 33 adapted fields for youth with a disability. These are located at rehabilitation centers and special schools and are adapted to the user group. To adapt to the special wishes of the institutions, a collaboration has started with the Rietveld Academy; from mid-2008, students can offer inventive solutions for adapted courts.

=== Bartiméus ===
On May 22, 2007 Cruyff Court Oranje Veld Zeist was opened at Bartiméus, a living, learning and working community for visually impaired. This was the first custom field, but it is accessible to everyone in Zeist. This court has extra lines for goalball, a throwing game played with a rumble ball. Furthermore, contrasting colors have been used: the outlet room and the fences are blue and the lines yellow. For the goal ball, goals can be placed along the long sides.

== Financing and implementation ==
=== Regular partners ===
Thanks to the Hattrick Program of the UEFA the CCKV could be set up. Hattrick makes money available to the national football associations for the construction of synthetic turf pitches. Where a field is desired, the municipality assigns possible locations, a checklist of pros and cons, and declarations of intent from BVOs or football clubs.

Other regular partners:

- Koninklijke Ten Cate for the synthetic turf.
- Netherlands Institute for Sports and Exercise (NISB) for project management.
- Research and inspection company ISA Sport for the technical quality of the field.
- W.J.H. Mulierinstituut for long-term research into the influence of the courts on the living environment in the neighborhood.

=== Other partners ===
After fields in Amsterdam, Eindhoven and Rotterdam, the Oranje Veld Zeist is the fourth to be donated by the Netherlands National Team. The indication Oranje refers to it, as the name Aron Winter Field refers to the sponsor of that field in residential and/or birthplace Lelystad. Dennis Bergkamp had at the end of his career a site in the London district Islington.

Each Dutch Talent of the Year can designate a location for a new field. Arjen Robben, Klaas-Jan Huntelaar and Wesley Sneijder chose their birthplaces Bedum, Hummelo and Utrecht. In 2008 the "Ibrahim Afellay Field" "will be created in Al Hoceima, Morocco, where his family has always lived. Cooperation with the Stichting MaroquiStars has been sought for this.

Another 22 courts are largely donated by clubs from professional football and are in their playing city. In total, at least 32 fields are financed by professional football. If in the name only a city or district is mentioned, then the municipality is usually one of the biggest donors.
