= Johan Cruyff Foundation =

Foundation for children with disabilities

- Formation: 25 April 1997; 29 years ago
- Founders: Johan Cruyff
- Type: Nonprofit organization
- Purpose: Health; Recreation; Youth and disability
- Headquarters: Olympisch Stadion 13, Amsterdam, North Holland, Netherlands
- Region served: Worldwide
- Methods: Sports; Design; construction
- Chairman: Pim Berendsen
- Treasurer: Michael van Praag
- Secretary: Jeroen van Seeters
- Affiliations: AFC Ajax N.V.
- Website: www.cruyff-foundation.org

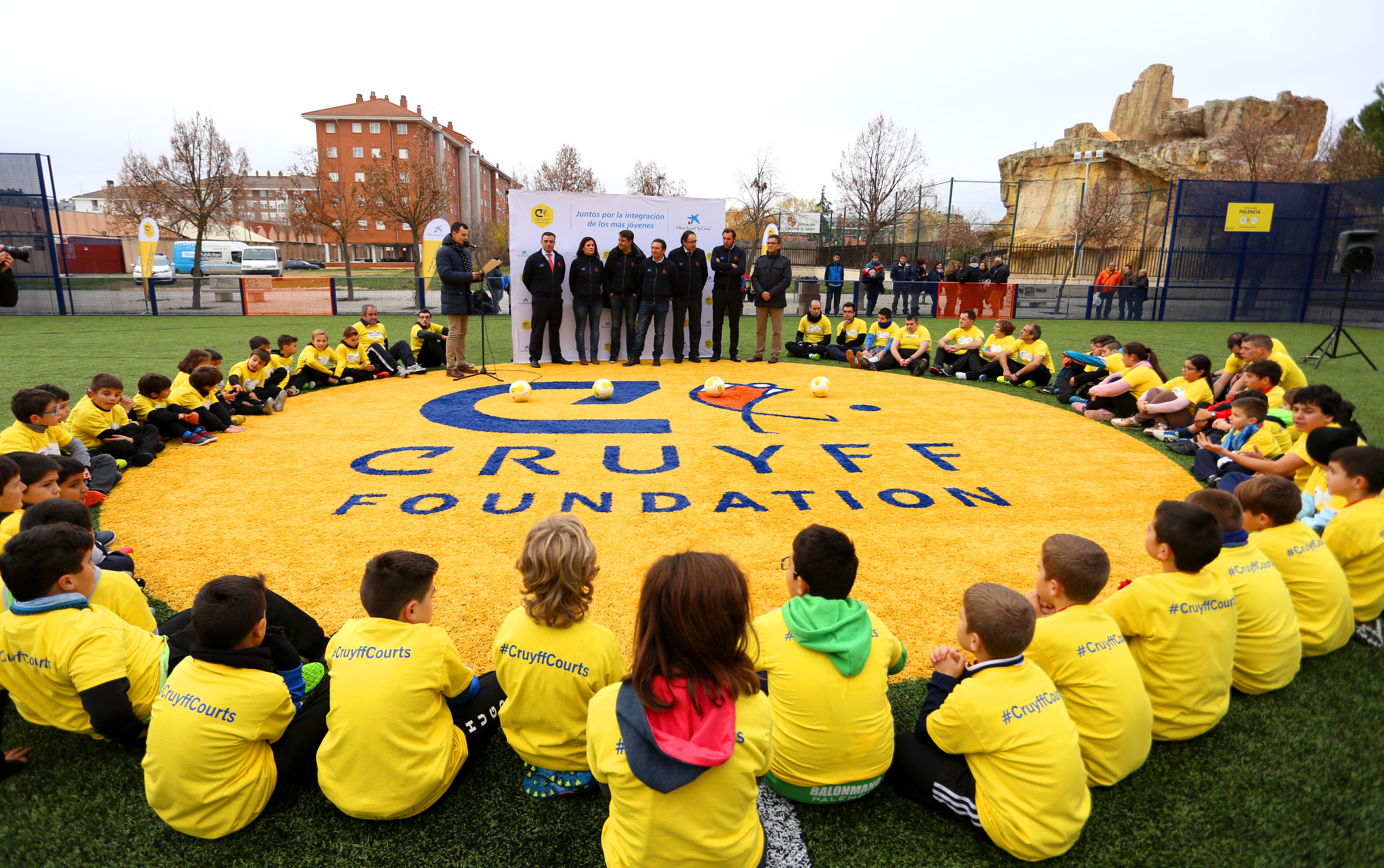
Inauguration of a Cruyff Court in Palencia (Spain)

The Johan Cruyff Foundation (initially Johan Cruyff Welfare Foundation) is a foundation started in 1997 by Dutch soccer player and coach Johan Cruijff (1947–2016) to provide opportunities for children, especially children with disabilities, to be active in sports and play. To that end it builds "Cruyff Courts", small soccer fields with artificial grass, integrated into neighborhoods. By 2016 it had built over 200 such courts, 33 of which specially designed for handicapped children in appropriate locations. Cruyff Courts are typically built as a partnership between the foundation and the city government, and if a court is near a school, it has to host a school soccer tournament at least once a year.

Cruyff started the foundation in 1997, the year he turned 50, commenting later that it was better to organize charity by himself than lending his name to other efforts over which he had no control. Advice came from Terre des hommes. Its main office is in Amsterdam, overlooking the Olympic Stadium.
