= 1884 in the United Kingdom =

Events from the year 1884 in the United Kingdom.

== Incumbents ==
- Monarch – Victoria
- Prime Minister – William Ewart Gladstone (Liberal)

== Events ==
- 4 January – the Fabian Society is founded in London to promote gradualist social progress.
- 5 January – Gilbert and Sullivan's comic opera Princess Ida, a satire on feminism, has its première at the Savoy Theatre, London.
- 18 January – Dr William Price attempts to cremate his dead baby son, Iesu Grist, at Llantrisant. Later tried at Cardiff Assizes and acquitted on the grounds that cremation is not contrary to law, he is thus able to carry out the ceremony (the first in the U.K. in modern times) on 14 March.
- 26 January–29 March – the first British Home Championship is held between the Association football teams of England, Ireland, Scotland and Wales.
- 1 February – first fascicle of what will become the Oxford English Dictionary is published.
- 5 February – Derby County Football Club is founded in England.
- 15 February – Emma Keyse is murdered and John 'Babbacombe' Lee is suspected.
- 26 February – Fenian dynamite campaign: A bomb explodes in the left-luggage office at London Victoria station; bombs left at other London railway stations are defused.
- 3 March – sisters Catherine Flannagan and Margaret Higgins, the "Black Widows of Liverpool", are hanged for poisoning Higgins' husband for an insurance payout; they are suspected of at least four other similar murders.
- 13 March – the Siege of Khartoum begins in the Sudan as part of the Mahdist War: an Egyptian garrison led by British General Charles Gordon and Sudanese civilians are besieged by Mahdist forces.
- 28 March – Prince Leopold, the youngest son and eighth child of Queen Victoria and Prince Albert, dies, aged 30, in Cannes (France) following a fall complicated by his haemophilia. His son, Charles Edward, Duke of Saxe-Coburg and Gotha, is born nearly 4 months later.
- 22 April – Colchester earthquake ("the Great English earthquake") measuring EMS-98 VIII (Heavily damaging) is the UK's most destructive, although no direct fatalities can be confirmed.
- 29 May – Oscar Wilde marries Constance Lloyd in London.
- 30 May – Fenian dynamite campaign: Three bombs explode in London: at the headquarters of the Criminal Investigation Department and the Metropolitan Police Service's Special Irish Branch; in the basement of the Carlton Club (a gentlemen's club frequented by members of the Conservative Party); and outside the home of Conservative MP Sir Watkin Williams-Wynn; ten people are injured. A fourth bomb planted at the foot of Nelson's Column fails to explode.
- 23 June – Married Women's Property Act 1884, relates solely to the giving of evidence in criminal matters by husband and wife.
- 1 July – First International Forestry Exhibition opens in Edinburgh.
- 8 July – the NSPCC is founded as the London Society for the Prevention of Cruelty to Children.
- 16 July – a locomotive axle failure causes the derailment of an express passenger train from Manchester for London at Penistone; twenty-four passengers are killed.
- 23 July – the first tennis tournaments, held in the grounds of Shrubland Hall, Leamington Spa, are recorded in today's Courier.
- 22 September – HMS Wasp (1880) is wrecked on Tory Island, County Donegal, with the loss of 52 lives and only 6 survivors.
- 28 September – the Marks & Spencer department store chain starts life as Michael Marks’ market stall in Leeds Kirkgate Market, Yorkshire.
- 22 October
  - The International Meridian Conference meeting in Washington, D.C., adopts the Greenwich meridian as the world's prime meridian (voted on 13 October).
  - The "Nine Graces", nine women who are the first to be awarded degrees from the Royal University of Ireland, become the first women in the United Kingdom to be awarded degrees. They include Alice Oldham, Isabella Mulvany and Charlotte M. Taylor.
- 18 October – University College of North Wales, Bangor founded.
- 1 November – Leicester City F.C. play their first match, as Leicester Fosse Football Club.
- 2 November – the "Home Office Baby" is delivered to the Home Office.
- 2 November – fourteen people are killed when some of the audience at the Star Theatre, Glasgow, panics following a false fire alarm.
- 4 December – Tom Dudley and Edwin Stephens are convicted of murder in the survival cannibalism case of R v. Dudley and Stephens.
- 6 December – Representation of the People Act ("Third Reform Act") extends the franchise uniformly across the U.K. in county as well as borough constituencies to all male tenants paying a £10 rental or occupying land to that value. This extends the franchise from around 3,040,000 voters to around 5,700,000.
- 9 December – Dudley and Stephens receive the mandatory death penalty with a recommendation for clemency and on 13 December are told that their penalties have been commuted to six months' imprisonment.

== Publications ==
- A New English Dictionary on historical principles, part 1, edited by James A. H. Murray.
- Arthur Conan Doyle's (anonymous) story based on the disappearance of the Mary Celeste, "J. Habakuk Jephson's Statement" (Cornhill Magazine, January).
- Arnold Toynbee's lectures (collected posthumously) Lectures on the Industrial Revolution in England.

== Births ==
- 18 January – Arthur Ransome, children's author and journalist (died 1967)
- 10 February – Frederick Hawksworth, mechanical engineer (died 1976)
- 12 February – Norman Jewson, Arts and Crafts architect (died 1975)
- 19 February – Clement Davies, Welsh politician, leader of the Liberal Party (died 1962)
- 6 March – R. Williams Parry, Welsh poet (died 1956)
- 13 March – Sir Hugh Walpole, novelist (died 1941)
- 1 April – J. C. Squire, writer and critic (died 1958)
- 10 May – Olga Petrova, English-born actress (died 1977)
- 5 June – Ivy Compton-Burnett, novelist (died 1969)
- 13 June – Gerald Gardner, founder of the Wiccan religion (died 1964)
- 21 June
  - Claude Auchinleck, field marshal (died 1981)
  - Gordon Lowe, British tennis player (died 1972)
- 29 June
  - William Whitworth, admiral (died 1973)
  - Francis Brett Young, novelist (died 1954)
- 19 July
  - Maurice Nicoll, psychiatrist (died 1953)
  - Charles Edward, Duke of Albany, grandson of Queen Victoria (died 1954)
- 23 July – Dilly Knox, cryptanalyst (died 1943)
- 10 August – Douglas Macmillan, founder of Macmillan Cancer Support (died 1969)
- 12 August – Frank Swinnerton, novelist (died 1982)
- 6 October – MacDonald Gill, designer (died 1947)
- 18 October – Manny Shinwell, politician (died 1986)
- 24 November – Frank Foley, Secret Intelligence Service officer and humanitarian (died 1958)
- 25 November – Alexander Cadogan, diplomat (died 1968)
- 17 December – Alison Uttley, children's writer (died 1976)
- 19 December – Stanley Unwin, publisher (died 1968)

== Deaths ==
- 8 January – Eugenius Birch, pier engineer (born 1818)
- 4 February – Lord Edward Thynne, politician and aristocrat (born 1807)
- 8 February – Montagu Bertie, 6th Earl of Abingdon, politician and aristocrat (born 1808)
- 11 February – John Hutton Balfour, botanist (born 1808)
- 17 February – Charles Stuart Calverley, poet and wit (born 1831)
- 1 March – Isaac Todhunter, mathematician (born 1820)
- 10 March – William Blanchard Jerrold, journalist (born 1826)
- 28 March – Prince Leopold, Duke of Albany, member of the royal family (born 1853)
- 1 April – Marie Litton, actress (born 1847)
- 5 April – John Wisden, cricketer, creator of Wisden Cricketers' Almanack (born 1826)
- 11 April – Charles Reade, novelist (born 1814)
- 29 April – Sir Michael Costa, conductor (born 1808 in Italy)
- 29 May – Sir Henry Bartle Frere, colonial administrator (born 1815)
- 15 July – Henry Wellesley, 1st Earl Cowley, diplomat (born 1804)
- 23 July – Anna Mary Howitt, writer, painter and feminist (born 1822)
- 6 August – Robert Spear Hudson, English businessman and philanthropist (born 1812)
- 10 September – George Bentham, botanist (born 1800)
- 6 November
  - Henry Fawcett, statesman, economist and Postmaster General (born 1833)
  - George Vane-Tempest, 5th Marquess of Londonderry, industrialist (born 1884)
- 3 December – Jane C. Bonar, Scottish hymnwriter (born 1821)
- 4 December – Alice Mary Smith, composer (born 1839)
- 20 December – William Lindsay Alexander, church leader (born 1808)
