= 1884 =

1884 in various calendars
- Gregorian calendar: 1884; MDCCCLXXXIV
- Ab urbe condita: 2637
- Armenian calendar: 1333; ԹՎ ՌՅԼԳ
- Assyrian calendar: 6634
- Baháʼí calendar: 40–41
- Balinese saka calendar: 1805–1806
- Bengali calendar: 1290–1291
- Berber calendar: 2834
- British Regnal year: 47 Vict. 1 – 48 Vict. 1
- Buddhist calendar: 2428
- Burmese calendar: 1246
- Byzantine calendar: 7392–7393
- Chinese calendar: 癸未年 (Water Goat); 4581 or 4374 — to — 甲申年 (Wood Monkey); 4582 or 4375
- Coptic calendar: 1600–1601
- Discordian calendar: 3050
- Ethiopian calendar: 1876–1877
- Hebrew calendar: 5644–5645
- Hindu calendars
- Vikram Samvat: 1940–1941
- Shaka Samvat: 1805–1806
- Kali Yuga: 4984–4985
- Holocene calendar: 11884
- Igbo calendar: 884–885
- Iranian calendar: 1262–1263
- Islamic calendar: 1301–1302
- Japanese calendar: Meiji 17 (明治１７年)
- Javanese calendar: 1813–1814
- Julian calendar: Gregorian minus 12 days
- Korean calendar: 4217
- Minguo calendar: 28 before ROC 民前28年
- Nanakshahi calendar: 416
- Thai solar calendar: 2426–2427
- Tibetan calendar: ཆུ་མོ་ལུག་ལོ་ (female Water-Sheep); 2010 or 1629 or 857 — to — ཤིང་ཕོ་སྤྲེ་ལོ་ (male Wood-Monkey); 2011 or 1630 or 858

1884 (MDCCCLXXXIV) was a leap year starting on Tuesday of the Gregorian calendar and a leap year starting on Sunday of the Julian calendar, the 1884th year of the Common Era (CE) and Anno Domini (AD) designations, the 884th year of the 2nd millennium, the 84th year of the 19th century, and the 5th year of the 1880s decade. As of the start of 1884, the Gregorian calendar was 12 days ahead of the Julian calendar, which remained in localized use until 1923.

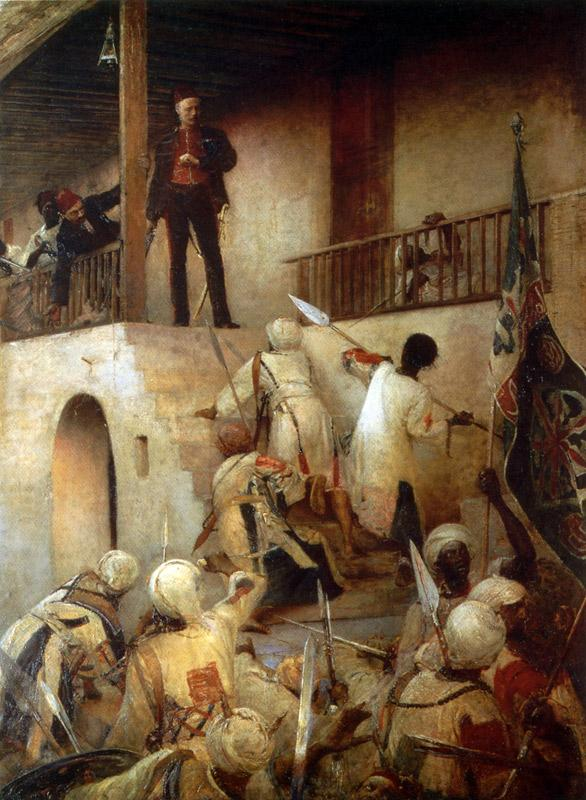
March 13: Siege of Khartoum.

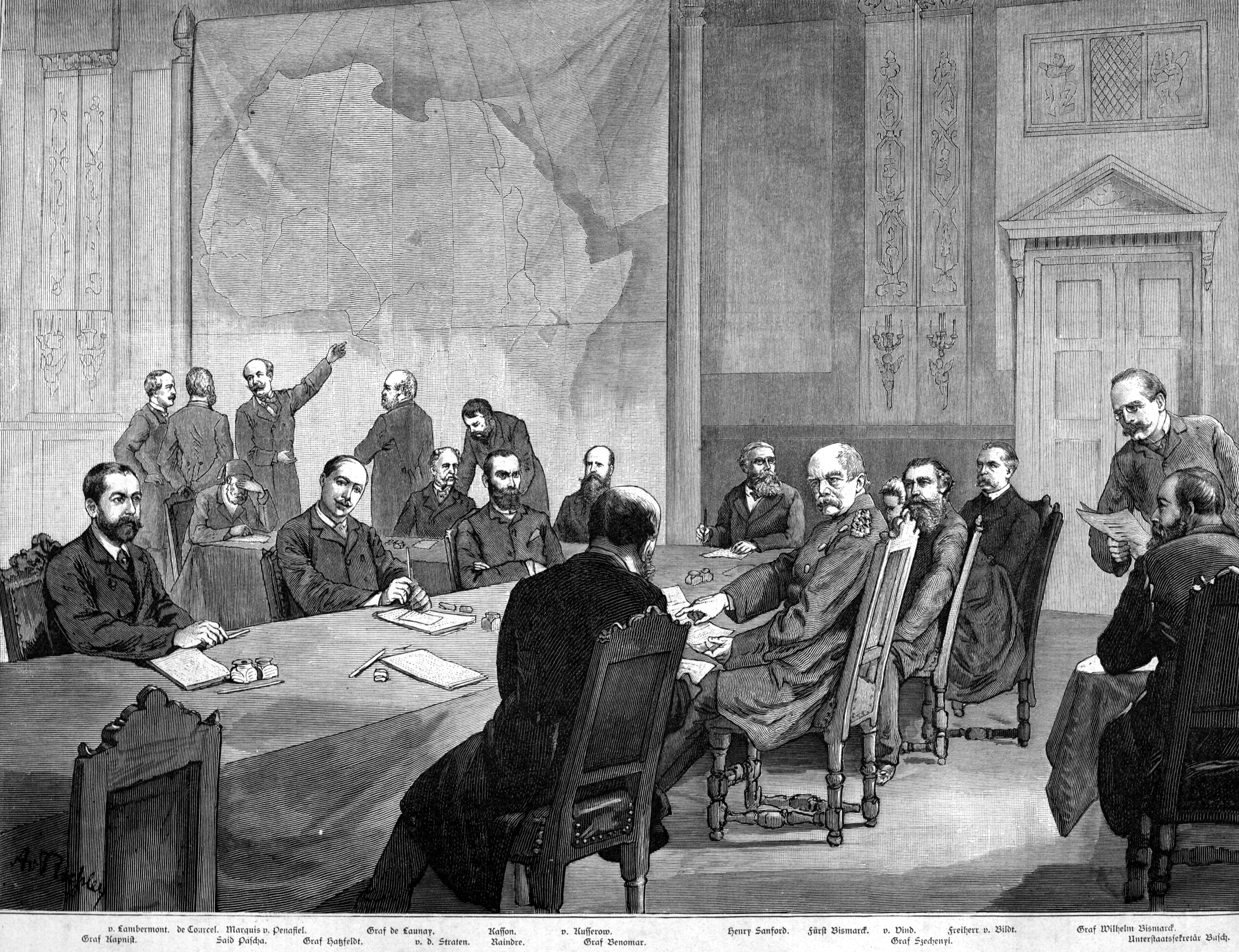
November 15: Berlin Conference

== Events ==
=== January ===
- January 4 – The Fabian Society is founded in London to promote gradualist social progress.
- January 5 – Gilbert and Sullivan's comic opera Princess Ida, a satire on feminism, premières at the Savoy Theatre, London.
- January 7 – German microbiologist Robert Koch isolates Vibrio cholerae, the cholera bacillus, working in India.
- January 18 – William Price attempts to cremate his dead baby son, Iesu Grist, in Wales. Later tried and acquitted on the grounds that cremation is not contrary to English law, he is thus able to carry out the ceremony (the first in the United Kingdom in modern times) on March 14, setting a legal precedent.
- January – Arthur Conan Doyle's anonymous story "J. Habakuk Jephson's Statement" appears in the Cornhill Magazine (London). Based on the disappearance of the crew of the Mary Celeste in 1872, many of the fictional elements introduced by Doyle come to replace the real events in the popular imagination.

=== February ===
- February 1 – A New English Dictionary on historical principles, part 1 (edited by James A. H. Murray), the first fascicle of what will become The Oxford English Dictionary, is published in England.
- February 5 – Derby County Football Club is founded in England.

=== March ===
- March 13 – The Siege of Khartoum begins in the Sudan as part of the Mahdist War: an Egyptian garrison led by British General Charles Gordon and Sudanese civilians are besieged by Mahdist forces; the city falls on January 26, 1885.
- March 28 – Prince Leopold, the youngest son and eighth child of Queen Victoria and Prince Albert, dies, aged 30 in Cannes (France) following a fall complicated by his haemophilia. His son, Charles Edward, Duke of Saxe-Coburg and Gotha, is born nearly 4 months later.
- March – John Joseph Montgomery conducts the first manned glider flights in the United States near Otay, California.

=== April ===
- April 4 – The Treaty of Valparaiso, an armistice between Chile and Bolivia, ends the War of the Pacific; Bolivia is obliged to cede Antofagasta to Chile, leaving Bolivia as a landlocked country.
- April 20 – Pope Leo XIII publishes the encyclical Humanum genus, denouncing Freemasonry and certain liberal beliefs which he considers to be associated with it.
- April 24
  - A German protectorate is established over South-West Africa.
  - The Colchester earthquake ("the Great English earthquake") measuring EMS-98 VIII (Heavily damaging) is the UK's most destructive, although no direct fatalities can be confirmed.

=== May ===
- May 1 – The eight-hour workday is first proclaimed by the Federation of Organized Trades and Labor Unions in the United States. This date, called May Day or Labour Day, becomes a holiday recognized in almost every industrialized country.
- May 4 – The Panic of 1884 creates a credit shortage that accelerates the current United States economic recession into the Depression of 1882–1885.
- May 16
  - Angelo Moriondo of Turin is granted a patent for an espresso machine.
  - Sweden's Finance Minister Robert Themptander becomes his country's Prime Minister (1884–88).

=== June ===
- June 4 (N.S.) (May 23 O.S.) – The future flag of Estonia is consecrated as the flag of the Estonian Students' Society.
- June 13 – LaMarcus Adna Thompson opens the "Gravity Pleasure Switchback Railway" at Coney Island, New York City.
- June 28 – The Norwegian Association for Women's Rights (Norsk Kvinnesaksforening) is founded. Also this year, the Fredrika Bremer Association (Fredrika Bremer Förbundet) is founded in Sweden for the same purpose.
- June – The first ascent is made of Castle Mountain in the Canadian Rockies, by geologist Arthur Philemon Coleman.

=== July ===
- July 1 – First International Forestry Exhibition opens in Edinburgh, Scotland.
- July 3 – The Dow Jones Transportation Average, consisting of eleven transportation-related companies (nine railroads and two non-rail companies, Western Union and Pacific Mail), is created in the United States. The index is the oldest stock index to remain in use.
- July 5 – Germany takes possession of Togoland.
- July 7 – Nagasaki Shipyard, predecessor of the Japanese aircraft and shipbuilding business Mitsubishi, is founded on the island of Kyushu.
- July 14 – German administration is established in Cameroon.
- July 23 – The first tennis tournaments, held in the grounds of Shrubland Hall, Leamington Spa, England, are recorded in today's Courier.

=== August ===
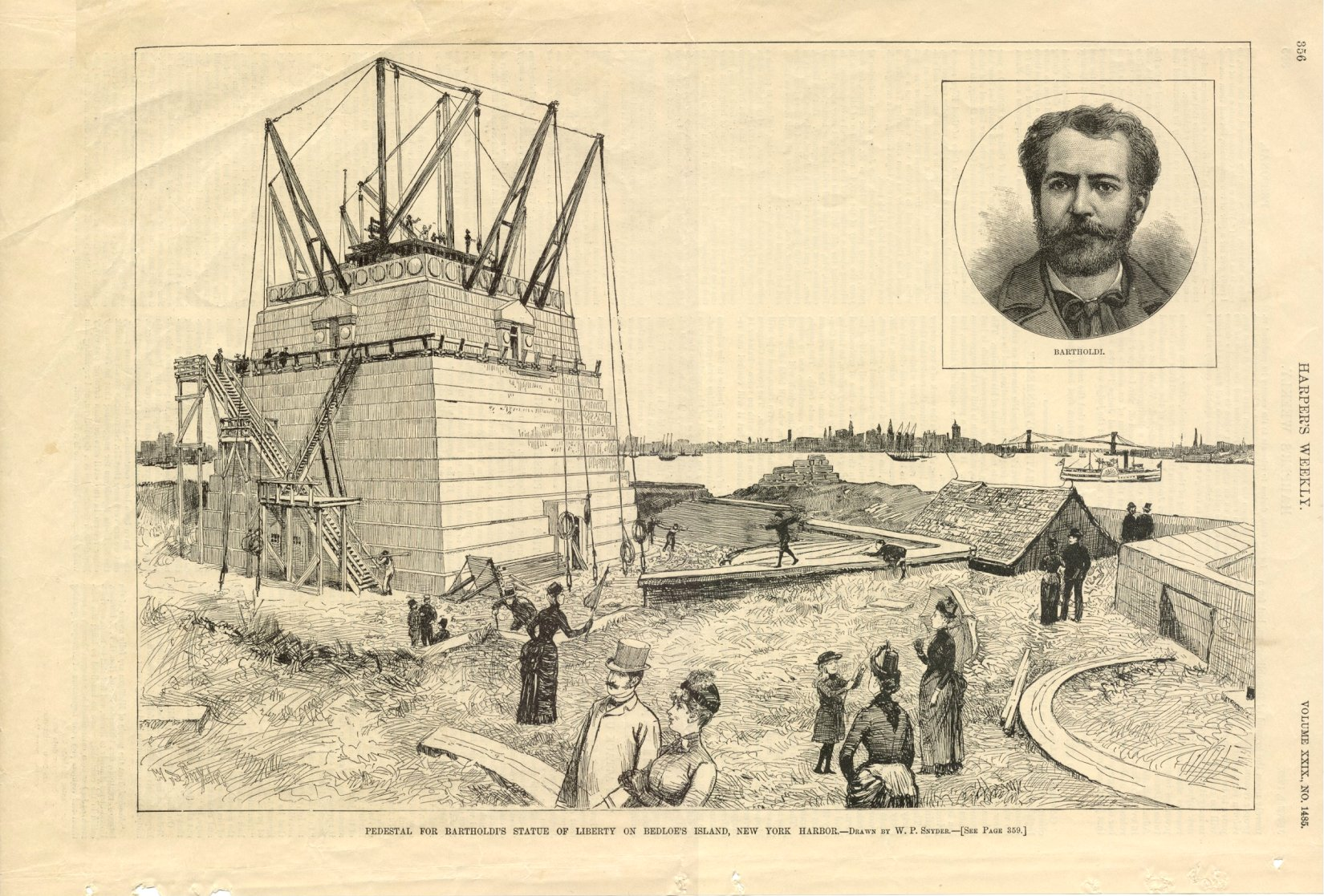
August 5: Statue of Liberty erection begins

- August 5 – The cornerstone for the Statue of Liberty is laid on Bedloe's Island in New York Harbor.
- August 10 – An earthquake measuring 5.5 M_{fa} affects a very large portion of the eastern United States. The shock has a maximum Mercalli intensity of VII (Very strong). Chimneys are toppled in New York, New Jersey, Connecticut and Pennsylvania. Property damage is severe in Jamaica, Queens and Amityville, New York.
- August 22 – The Sino-French War (for control of Tonkin) breaks out (continues to April 1885).
- August 23 – Sino-French War: Battle of Fuzhou – French Admiral Amédée Courbet's Far East Squadron virtually destroys China's Fujian Fleet.

=== September ===
- September 5 – Staten Island Academy is founded.
- September 15 – The invention of local anesthesia by ophthalmologist Karl Koller is made public at a medical congress in Heidelberg, Germany.
- September 23–24 (night) – Steamship Arctique runs aground near Cape Virgenes, leading to the discovery of nearby placer gold and beginning the Tierra del Fuego gold rush.

=== October ===
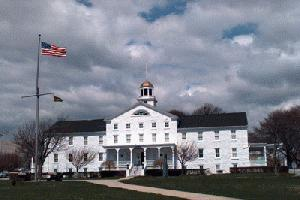
October 6: US Naval War College founded.

- October 6 – The United States Naval War College is established in Newport, Rhode Island.
- October 18 – The University College of North Wales, Bangor, is founded in the UK.
- October 22
  - The International Meridian Conference meeting in Washington, D.C., fixes the Greenwich meridian as the world's prime meridian (voted on October 13).
  - The "Nine Graces", nine women who are the first to be awarded degrees from the Royal University of Ireland, become the first women in the United Kingdom to be awarded degrees. They include Alice Oldham, Isabella Mulvany and Charlotte M. Taylor.
- October 30 – Hosay massacre in Trinidad: British colonial authorities fire on Indian indentured labourers marking a religious festival, killing at least 9.

=== November ===
- November 1
  - The Irish Gaelic Athletic Association is founded in Thurles, Ireland.
  - Leicester City F.C. play their first match, as Leicester Fosse Football Club, in England.
- November 2 – Timișoara, Romania, is the first town in Europe with streets illuminated by electric light.
- November 4 – 1884 United States presidential election: Democratic governor of New York Grover Cleveland defeats Republican James G. Blaine in a very close contest, to win the first of his non-consecutive terms.
- November 4 – HKJC Open.
- November 15 – The Berlin Conference, which regulates European colonisation and trade in Africa, begins (ends February 26, 1885).

=== December ===
- December 1
  - American Old West: Near Frisco, New Mexico, deputy sheriff Elfego Baca holds off a gang of 80 Texan cowboys, who want to kill him for arresting cowboy Charles McCarthy (the cowboys have been terrorizing the area's Hispanos, and Baca is working against them).
  - Porfirio Díaz returns as President of Mexico, an office he will hold until 1911.
- December 4 – Reformers in Korea who admire the Meiji Restoration in Japan stage the Gapsin Coup, with Japan's help. China intervenes to rescue the king and help suppress the rebels.
- December 6
  - The Washington Monument is completed in Washington, D.C., becoming the tallest structure in the world at this date.
  - The Third Reform Act widens the adult male electorate in the United Kingdom to around 60%.
- December 9 – Tom Dudley and Edwin Stephens are convicted of murder in the survival cannibalism case of R v. Dudley and Stephens in the English courts.
- December 10 – Mark Twain's Adventures of Huckleberry Finn is first published, in London.
- December 16 – The World Cotton Centennial world's fair opens in New Orleans.
- December 30 – Anton Bruckner's Symphony No. 7 is premiered in Leipzig, bringing the composer his first great success.

=== Date unknown ===
- The first Christian missionary arrives in Korea.
- Police training schools are established in every prefecture in Japan.
- The Yellow Crane Tower last burns in Wuhan.
- Scottish Plymouth Brethren missionary Frederick Stanley Arnot identifies the source of the Zambezi River, near Kalene Hill.
- The Stefan–Boltzmann law is reformulated by Ludwig Boltzmann.
- Mexican General Manuel Mondragón designs an early form of the Mondragón rifle, the world's first automatic rifle.
- Thomas Parker builds a practical production electric car in Wolverhampton (England) using his own specially designed high-capacity rechargeable batteries.
- The water hyacinth is introduced in the United States, and quickly becomes an invasive species.

== Births ==
=== January ===
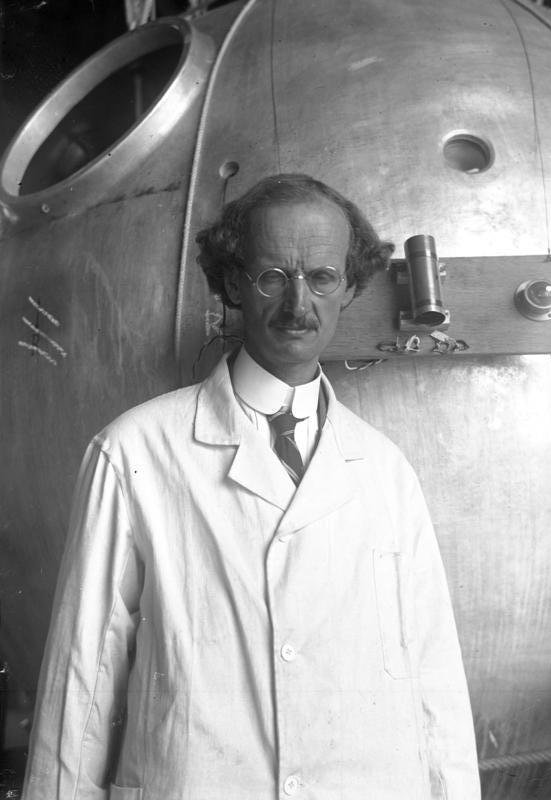
Auguste Piccard

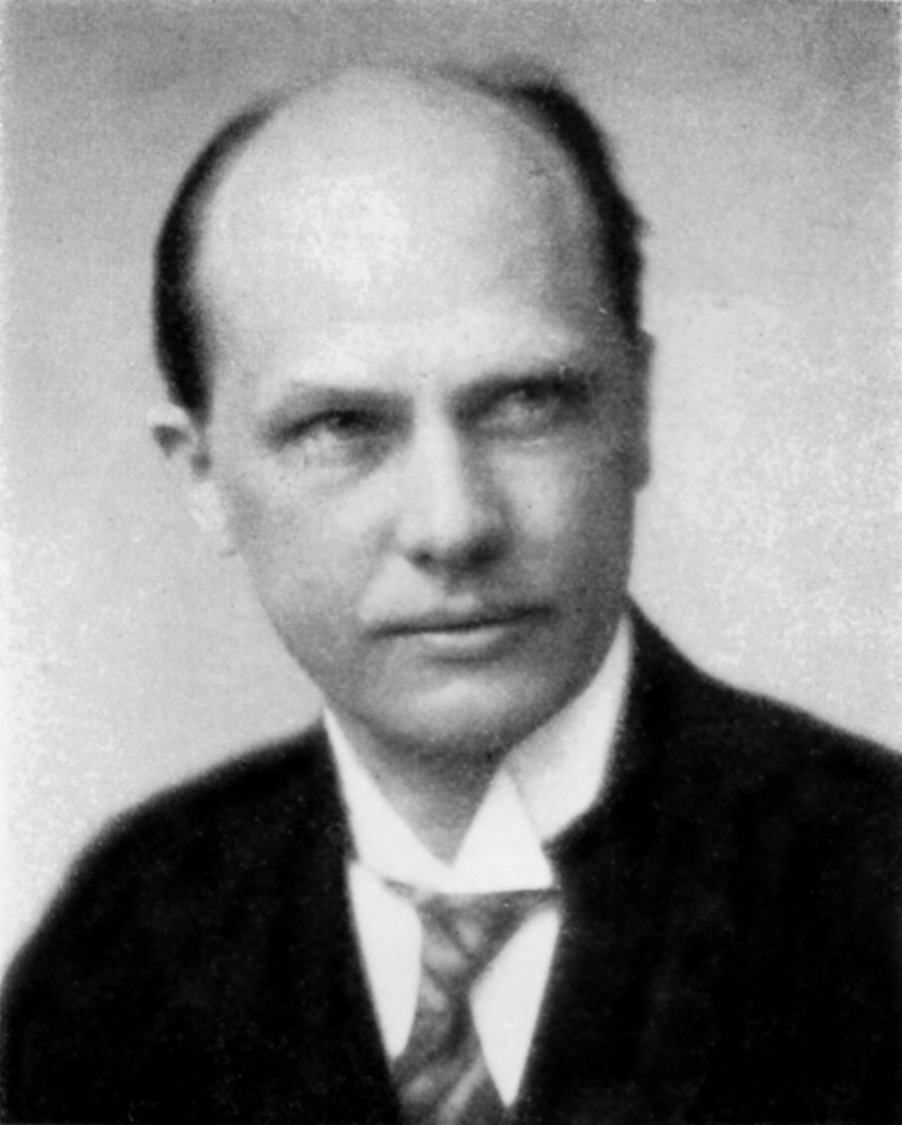
Rickard Sandler

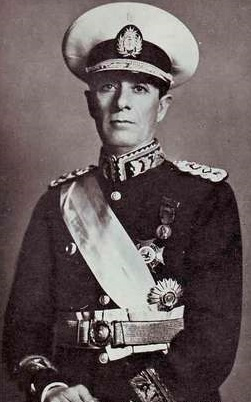
Pedro Pablo Ramírez

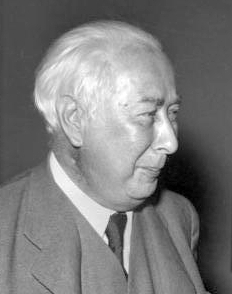
Theodor Heuss

- January 1
  - Chikuhei Nakajima, Japanese naval officer, engineer, and politician, founder of the Nakajima Aircraft Company (d. 1949)
  - Konstantinos Tsaldaris, Greek politician, 2-time prime minister of Greece (d. 1970)
- January 2 – Ben-Zion Dinur, Russian-born Israeli educator, historian and politician (d. 1973)
- January 12 – Texas Guinan, American vaudeville performer (d. 1933)
- January 16 – Hanns Kräly, Oscar-winning German screenwriter (d. 1950)
- January 20 – Charles W. Whittlesey, United States Army officer, commander of the Lost Battalion in World War I (d. 1921)
- January 21 – Roger Nash Baldwin, American social activist (d. 1981)
- January 23 – Ralph DePalma, Italian-born American race car driver (d. 1956)
- January 24 – Thomas Blamey, Australian field marshal (d. 1951)
- January 26
  - Gheorghe Avramescu, Romanian general (d. 1945)
  - Roy Chapman Andrews, American explorer, adventurer, and naturalist (d. 1960)
- January 28 – Auguste Piccard, Swiss physicist, balloonist, and inventor (d. 1962)
- January 29 – Rickard Sandler, 20th prime minister of Sweden (d. 1964)
- January 30
  - Sōjin Kamiyama, Japanese actor in American silent films,(d. 1954)
  - Pedro Pablo Ramírez, 26th president of Argentina, leader of World War II (d. 1962)
- January 31 – Theodor Heuss, German politician, 1st president of West Germany (d. 1963)

=== February ===
- February 1 – Bradbury Robinson, American football player, who threw the first forward pass in American football history (d. 1949)
- February 8 – Burt Mustin, American actor (d. 1977)
- February 12
  - Max Beckmann, German painter, graphic artist (d. 1950)
  - Marie Vassilieff, Russian artist (d. 1957)
  - Johan Laidoner, Estonian general and statesman (d.1953)
- February 13 – Alfred Carlton Gilbert, American athlete, inventor (d. 1961)
- February 15 – Mieczysław Norwid-Neugebauer, Polish general and politician (d. 1954)
- February 16 – Robert J. Flaherty, American filmmaker (d. 1951)
- February 17 – María Beatriz del Rosario Arroyo, Filipino Roman Catholic nun and servant of God (d. 1957)
- February 20 – Constantin Constantinescu-Claps, Romanian general (d. 1961)
- February 22 – Lew Cody, American actor (d. 1934)
- February 26 – John Cyril Porte, Irish-born British flying boat pioneer (d. 1919)
- February 28 – Ants Piip, Prime Minister of Estonia (d. 1942)

=== March ===
- March 11 – Ömer Seyfettin, Turkish writer (d. 1920)
- March 13 – Sir Hugh Walpole, English novelist (d. 1941)
- March 21 – George David Birkhoff, American mathematician (d. 1944)
- March 23 – Joseph Boxhall, RMS Titanic officer and survivor (d. 1967)
- March 24 – Peter Debye, Dutch chemist, Nobel Prize laureate (d. 1966)
- March 25 – Georges Imbert, Alsatian chemist (d. 1950)
- March 26
  - Wilhelm Backhaus, German pianist (d. 1969)
  - Isaac C. Kidd, American admiral (d. 1941)
- March 27 – James Cruze, American motion picture director (d. 1942)

=== April ===
- April 4 – Isoroku Yamamoto, Japanese admiral (d. 1943)
- April 5 – Ion Inculeț, President of Moldova (d. 1940)
- April 7 – Bronisław Malinowski, Polish anthropologist (d. 1942)
- April 12 – Otto Fritz Meyerhof, German-born physician, biochemist, and recipient of the Nobel Prize in Physiology or Medicine (d. 1951)
- April 17 – Fay Tincher, American comic actress (d. 1983)
- April 20 – Oliver Kirk, American Olympic boxer (d. 1960)
- April 22 – Tenby Davies, Welsh half-mile world champion runner (d. 1932)
- April 24 – Otto Froitzheim, German tennis player (d. 1962)

=== May ===
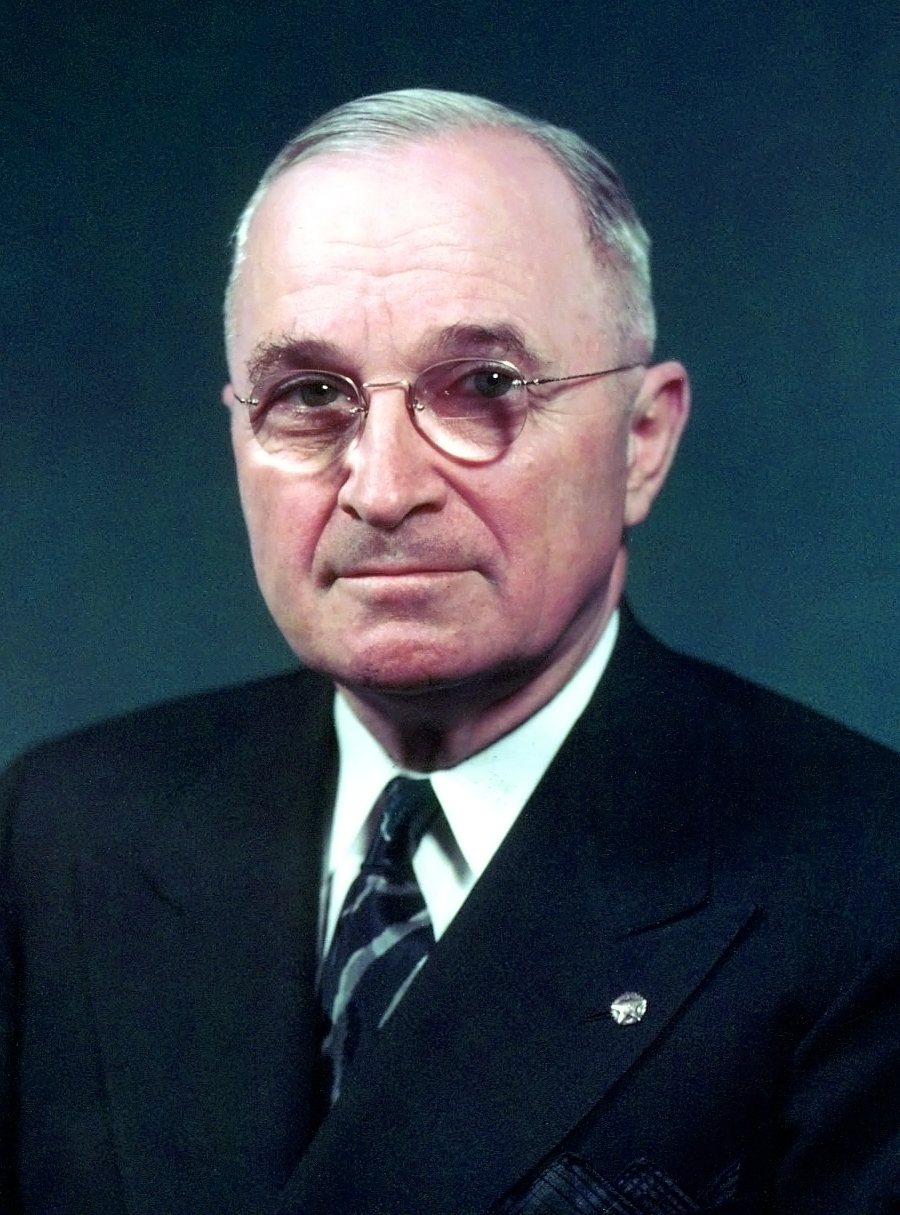
Harry S. Truman

- May 2 – John Boland, American politician (d. 1958)
- May 5 – Jean Decoux, French admiral, Governor-General of French Indochina (1940–1945) (d. 1963)
- May 8 – Harry S. Truman, 33rd president of the United States (d. 1972)
- May 10 – Olga Petrova, English-born American actress (d. 1977)
- May 14 – Claude Dornier, German aircraft designer (d. 1969)
- May 20 – Leon Schlesinger, American producer, filmmaker (d. 1949)
- May 22 – Cordelia Camp, American educator (d. 1973)
- May 23 – Corrado Gini, Italian statistician, demographer and sociologist (d. 1965)
- May 27 – Max Brod, Austrian author (d. 1968)
- May 28 – Edvard Beneš, Czechoslovak politician, prime minister and president of Czechoslovakia (d. 1948)
- May 30 – Robert Alfred Theobald, American admiral (d. 1957)

=== June ===
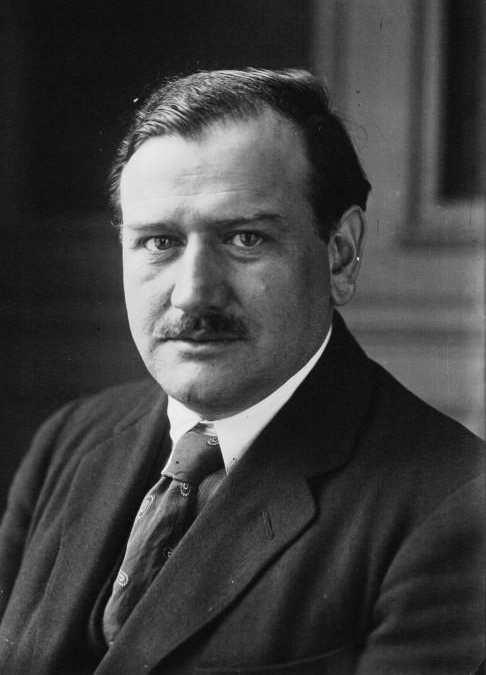
Édouard Daladier

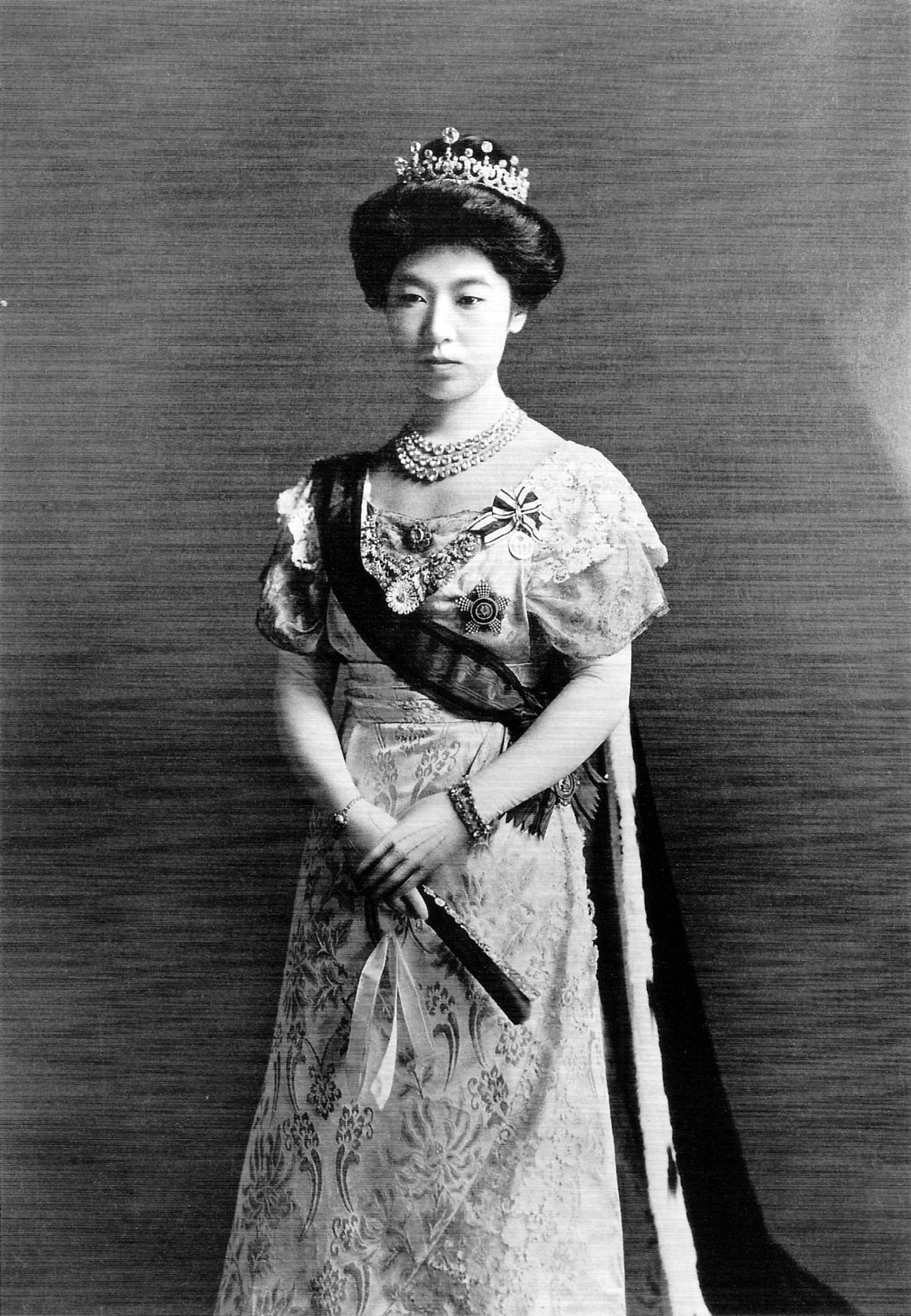
Empress Teimei

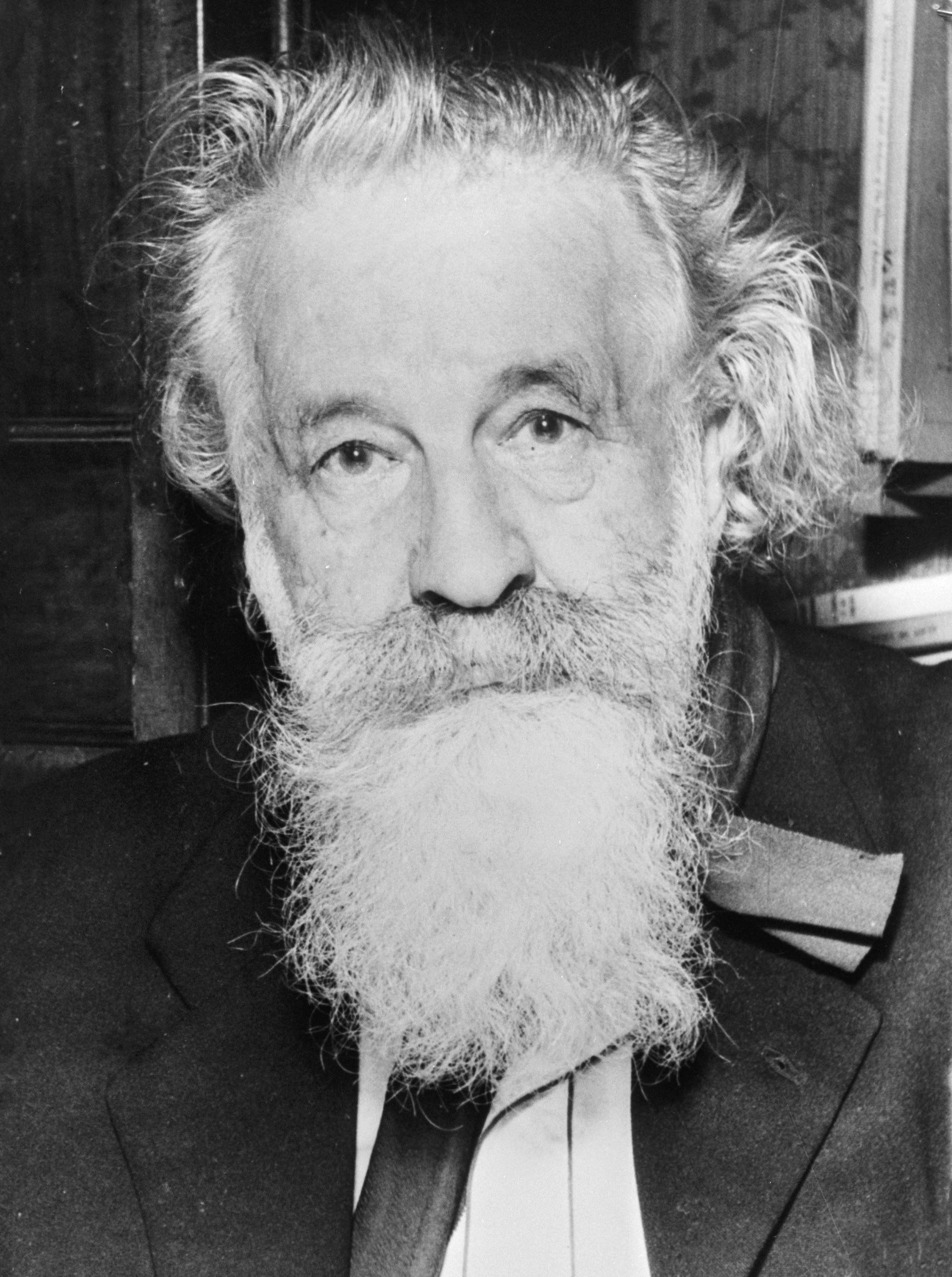
Gaston Bachelard

- June 13
  - Anton Drexler, German far-right politician (d. 1942)
  - Gerald Gardner, English founder of the Wiccan religion (d. 1964)
- June 17 – Prince Wilhelm, Duke of Södermanland (d. 1965)
- June 18 – Édouard Daladier, Prime Minister of France (d. 1970)
- June 21
  - Claude Auchinleck, British field marshal (d. 1981)
  - Gordon Lowe, British tennis player (d. 1972)
- June 23 – Cyclone Taylor, Canadian ice hockey player (d. 1979)
- June 25 – Empress Teimei, Japanese consort of Emperor Taishō (d. 1951)
- June 27 – Gaston Bachelard, French philosopher (d. 1962)
- June 29 – Nicolae Dăscălescu, Romanian general (d. 1969)
- June 30 – Franz Halder, German general (d. 1972)

=== July ===
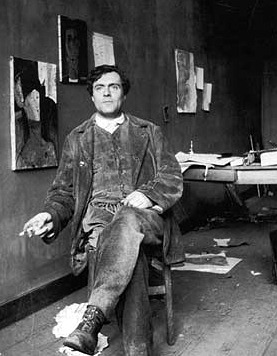
Amedeo Modigliani

- July 4 – Louis B. Mayer, American film producer, studio mogul (d. 1957)
- July 11 – Howard Estabrook, American actor, film director and producer, and screenwriter (d. 1978)
- July 12 – Amedeo Modigliani, Italian painter, sculptor (d. 1920)
- July 15 – Phraya Manopakorn Nititada, Thailand's first prime minister (d. 1948)
- July 17 – Prince George Bagration, Georgian nobleman (d. 1957)
- July 18 – Alberto di Jorio, Italian cardinal, secretary of the 1958 conclave (d. 1979)
- July 19 – Maurice Nicoll, British psychiatrist (d. 1953)
- July 20 – Félix Julien, french footballer (d. 1936)
- July 23 – Emil Jannings, Swiss-born German actor (d. 1950)
- July 25 – Rafael Arévalo Martínez, Guatemalan writer (d. 1975)
- July 26 – Joseph Sweeney, American actor (d. 1963)
- July 27 – Kathleen Howard, Canadian-born American opera singer, character actress (d. 1956)

=== August ===
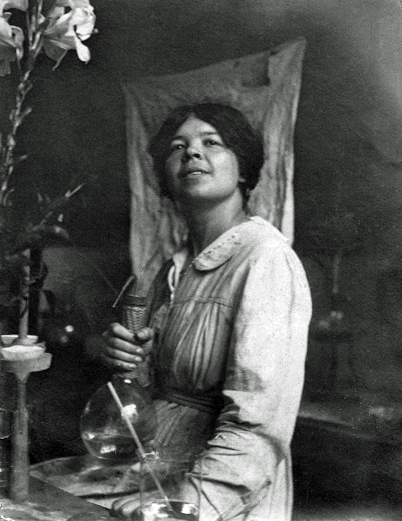
Nathalie Demassieux

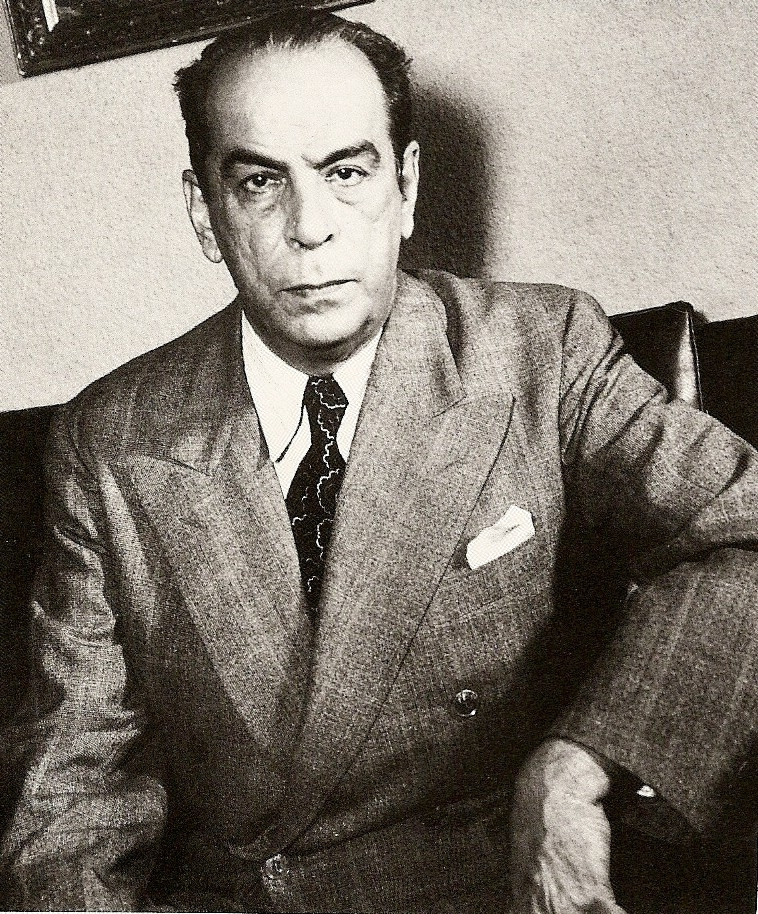
Rómulo Gallegos

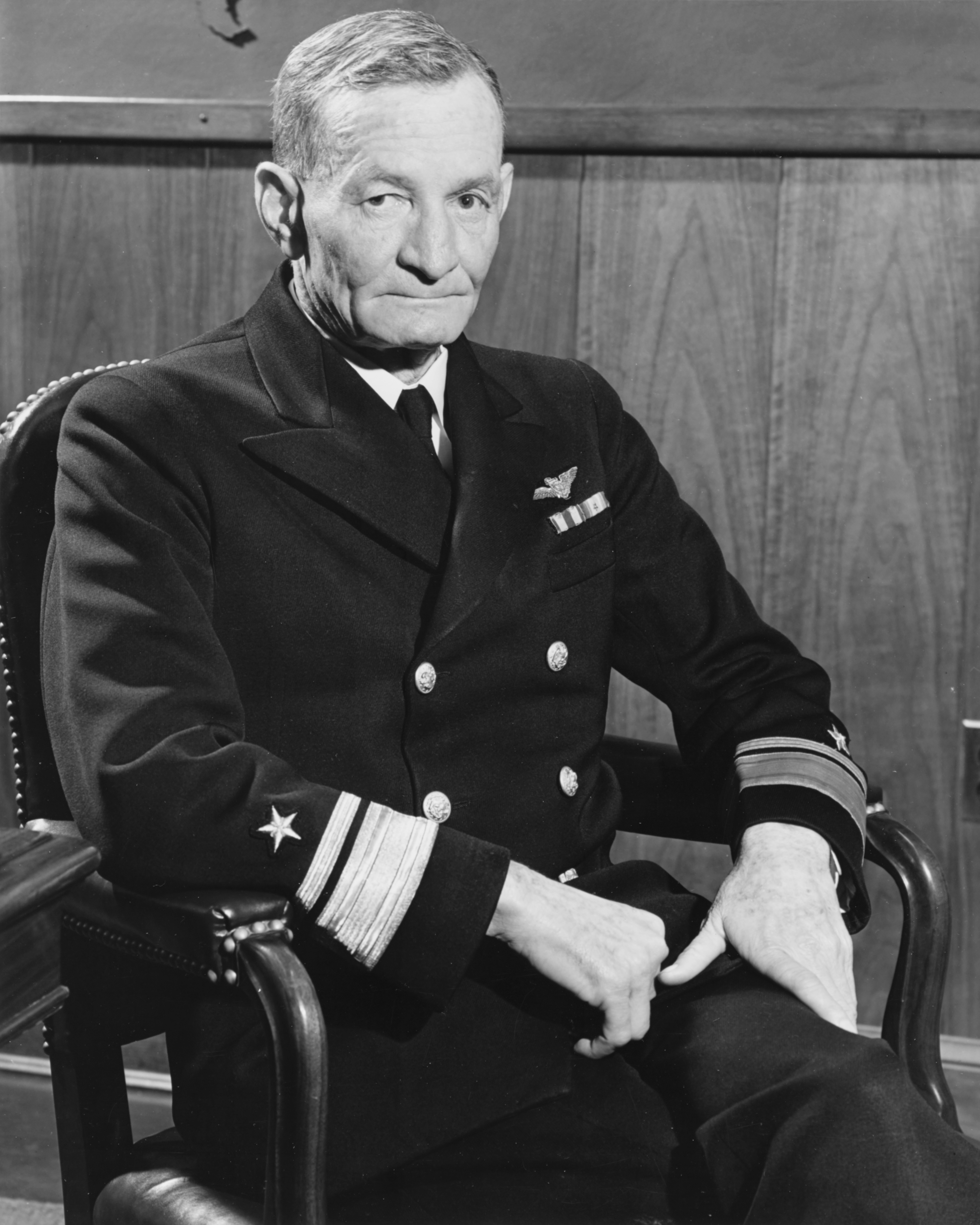
John S. McCain Sr.

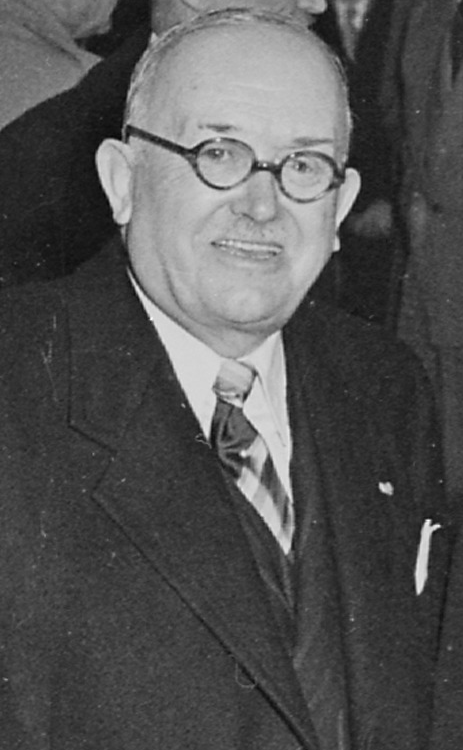
Vincent Auriol

- August 2 – Rómulo Gallegos, 48th president of Venezuela (d. 1969)
- August 7 – Billie Burke, American actress (d. 1970)
- August 8 – Sara Teasdale, American poet (d. 1933)
- August 9 – John S. McCain Sr., American admiral (d. 1945)
- August 10
  - Robert G. Fowler, American pioneer aviator (d. 1966)
  - Robert Wichard Pohl, German "Father of solid state physics" (d. 1976)
  - Panait Istrati, Romanian writer (d. 1935)
- August 15 – Mary Nash, American actress (d. 1976)
- August 20 – Rudolf Bultmann, German Lutheran theologian (d. 1976)
- August 23 – Will Cuppy, American humorist (d. 1949)
- August 25 – Nathalie Demassieux, French chemist and academic (d. 1961)
- August 27 – Vincent Auriol, President of France (d. 1966)
- August 28 – Peter Fraser, 24th prime minister of New Zealand (d. 1950)
- August 30 – Theodor Svedberg, Swedish chemist, Nobel Prize laureate (d. 1971)

=== September ===
- September 12 – Helen Palmatary, American anthropologist (d. 1976)
- September 13 – Petros Voulgaris, Prime Minister of Greece (d. 1957)
- September 17
  - Charles Tomlinson Griffes, American composer (d. 1920)
  - Edith Alice Macia, Arizona pioneer, postmaster, and undercover FBI agent (d. 1974)
- September 18 – Margit Slachta, Hungarian politician (d. 1974)
- September 24
  - İsmet İnönü, Turkish soldier, statesman, 3-time prime minister of Turkey and 2nd president of Turkey (d. 1973)
  - Hugo Schmeisser, German weapons designer (d. 1953)
- September 25 – Forrest Smithson, American Olympic athlete (d. 1962)
- September 30 – Bessie Barriscale, American actress (d. 1965)

=== October ===
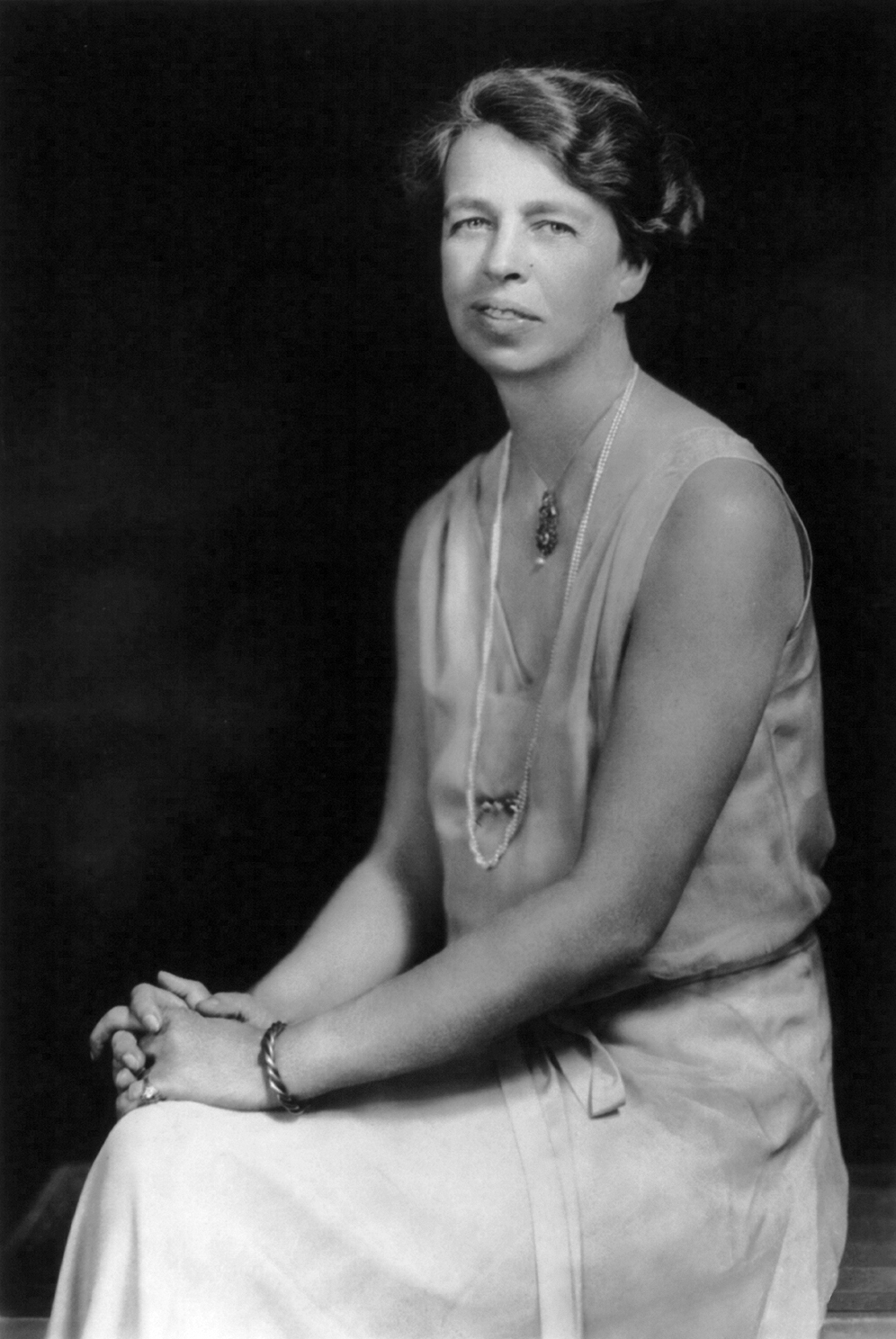
Eleanor Roosevelt

- October 8 – Walther von Reichenau, German field marshal (d. 1942)
- October 9 – Martin Johnson, American adventurer, documentary filmmaker (d. 1937)
- October 11
  - Friedrich Bergius, German chemist, Nobel Prize laureate (d. 1949)
  - Eleanor Roosevelt, American politician, diplomat, activist, and First Lady of the United States (d. 1962)
- October 16 – Rembrandt Bugatti, Italian sculptor (d. 1916)
- October 20 – D. S. Senanayake, 1st prime minister of Sri Lanka (d. 1952)
- October 24 – Arthur S. Carpender, American admiral (d. 1960)
- October 28 – William Douglas Cook, New Zealand founder of Eastwoodhill Arboretum and Pukeiti (d. 1967)

=== November ===
- November 4 – Harry Ferguson, Irish engineer, inventor (d. 1960)
- November 8 – Hermann Rorschach, Swiss psychologist (d. 1922)
- November 20 – Norman Thomas, American social reformer (d. 1968)
- November 22 – Sulaiman Nadvi, Indian/Pakistani historian, biographer, littérateur and scholar of Islam (d. 1953)
- November 24 – Yitzhak Ben-Zvi, 2nd president of Israel (d. 1963)

=== December ===
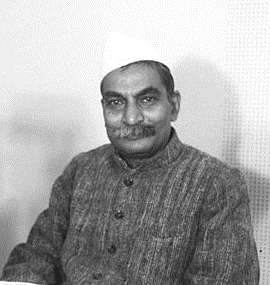
Rajendra Prasad

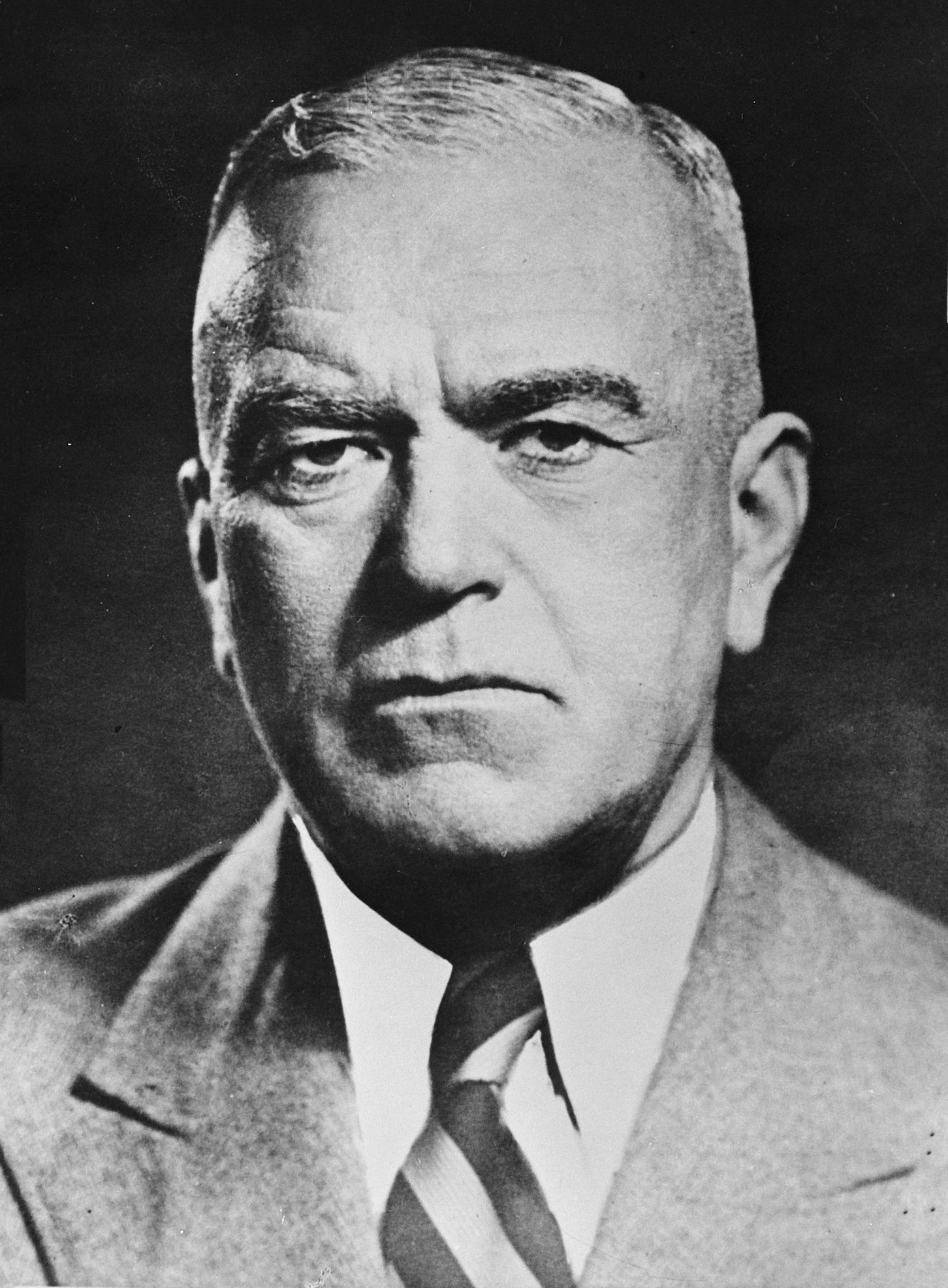
Petru Groza

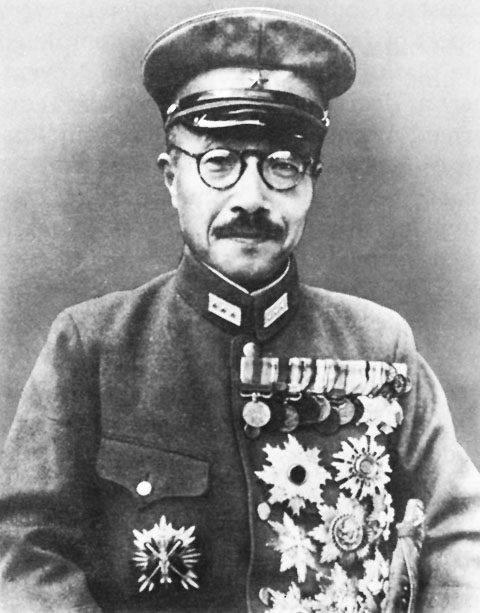
Hideki Tojo

- December 3
  - Walther Stampfli, member of the Swiss Federal Council (d. 1965)
  - Rajendra Prasad, Indian politician, 1st president of India (d. 1963)
- December 4 – R. C. Majumdar, Indian historian (d. 1980)
- December 7 – Petru Groza, Romanian politician, 46th prime minister of Romania (d. 1958)
- December 14 – Nicholas Charnetsky, Soviet Orthodox priest, bishop, martyr and blessed (d. 1959)
- December 17 – Alison Uttley, English writer of children's books (d. 1976)
- December 19 – Antonín Zápotocký, 6th president and 15th prime minister of Czechoslovakia (d. 1957)
- December 25
  - Samuel Berger, American Olympic boxer (d. 1925)
  - Evelyn Nesbit, American model, actress (d. 1967)
- December 29 – Ted Theodore, Australian politician, Premier of Queensland (d. 1950)
- December 30
  - Arthur Edmund Carewe, Armenian-American actor (d. 1937)
  - Hideki Tojo, Japanese general, 27th prime minister of Japan (d. 1948)
- December 31 – Stanley Forman Reed, Associate Justice of the Supreme Court of the United States (d. 1980)

=== Date unknown ===
- Ayoub Tabet, 6th prime minister of Lebanon (d. 1947)

== Deaths ==
=== January–June ===
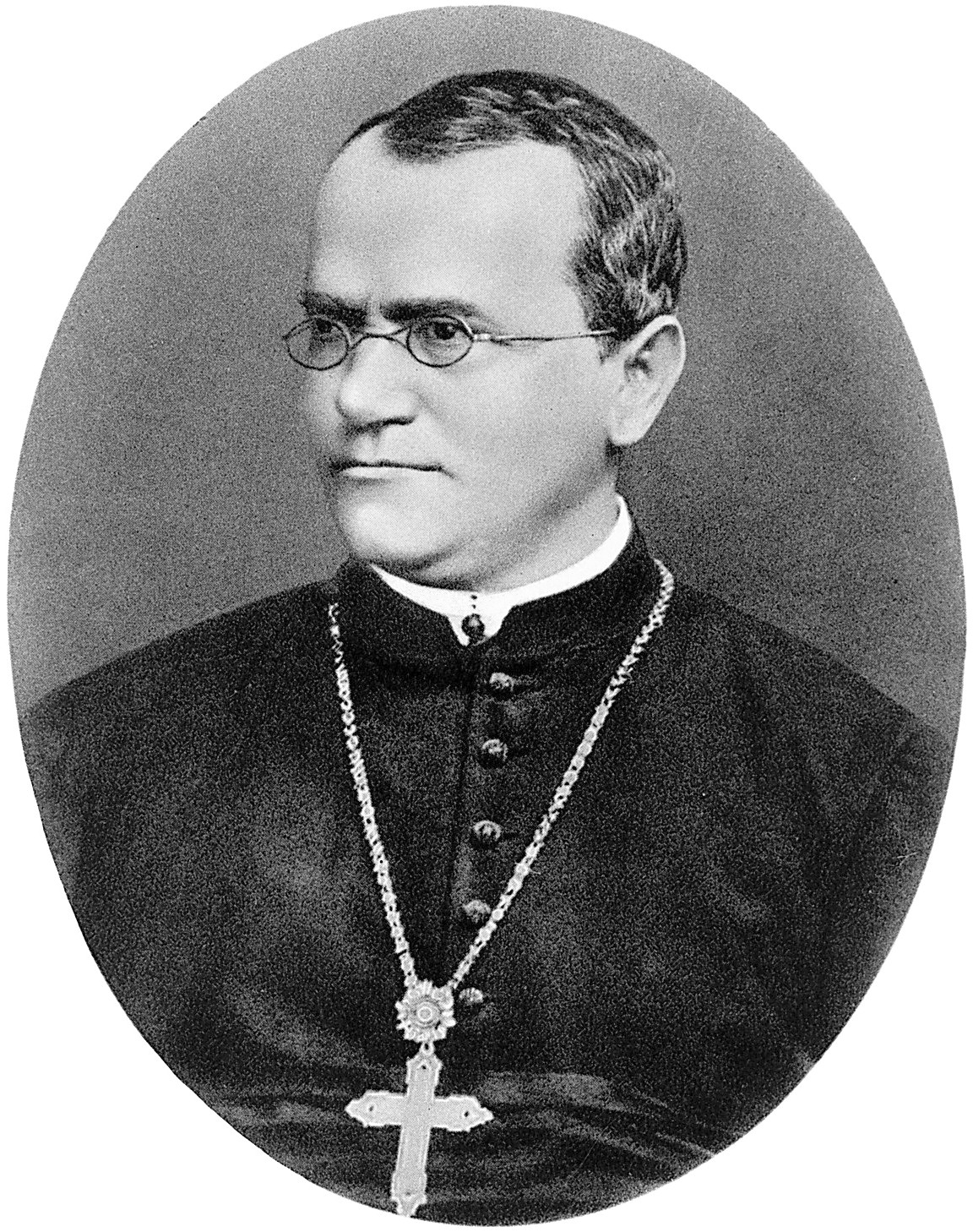
Gregor Mendel

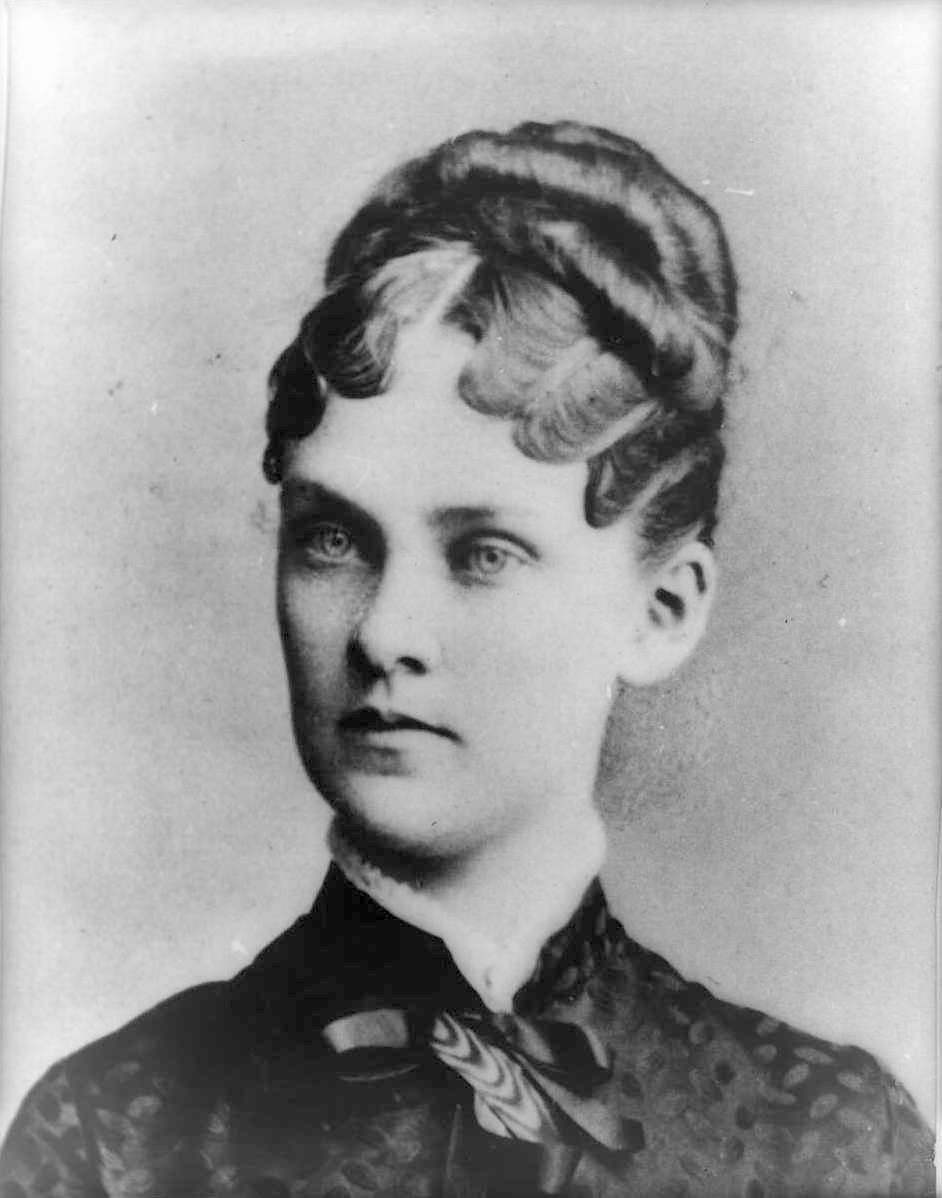
Alice Hathaway Lee Roosevelt

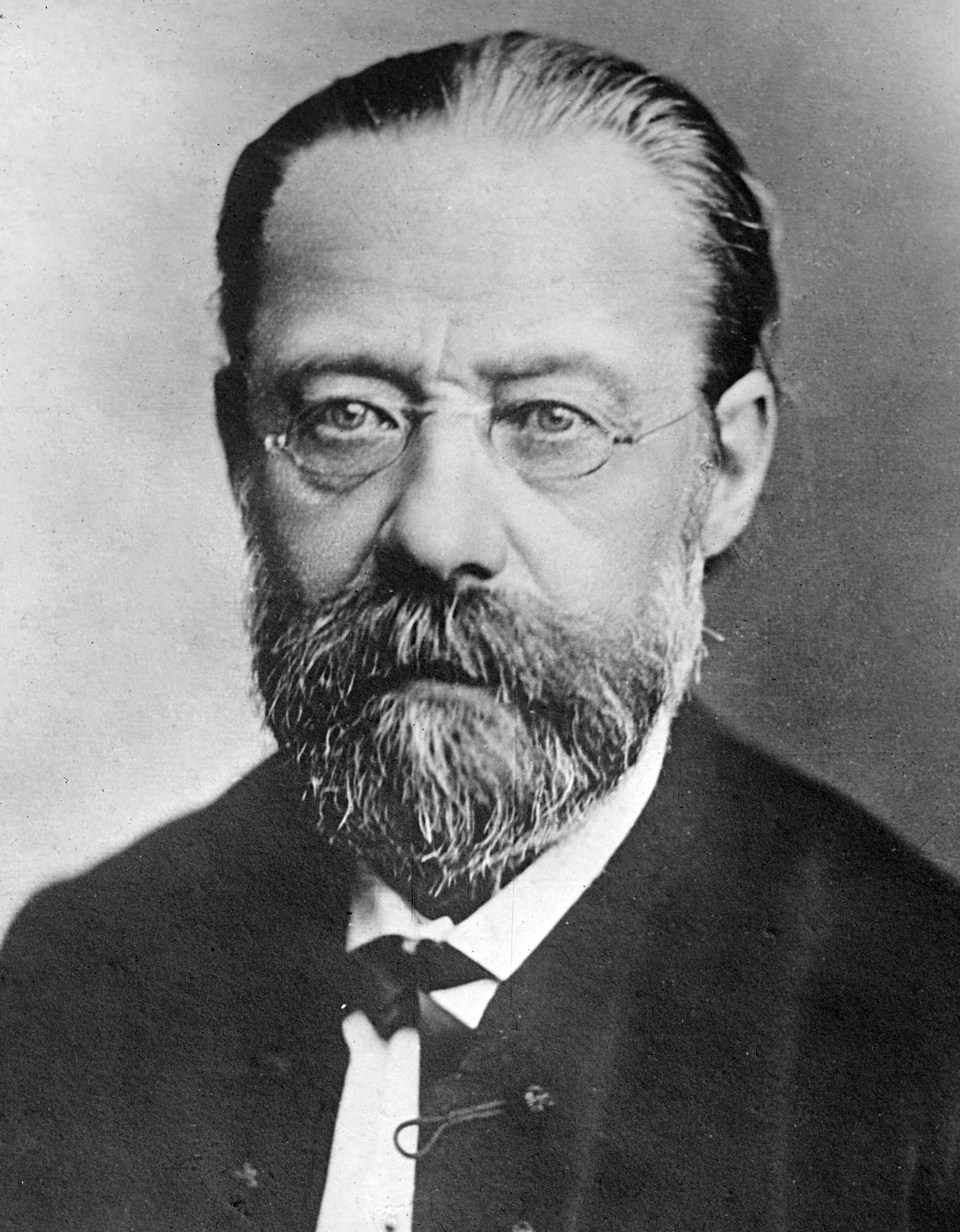
Bedřich Smetana

- January 6 – Gregor Mendel, Czech geneticist (b. 1822)
- January 25 – Johann Gottfried Piefke, German conductor, composer (b. 1815)
- February 8 – Cetshwayo kaMpande, Zulu king (b. 1826)
- February 13 – Wilhelm von Tümpling, Prussian general (b. 1809)
- February 14
  - Alice Hathaway Lee Roosevelt, first wife of Theodore Roosevelt (b. 1861)
  - Martha Bulloch Roosevelt, mother of Theodore Roosevelt (b. 1835)
- February 26 – Emmanuel Félix de Wimpffen, French general (b. 1811)
- March 1 – Isaac Todhunter, English mathematician (b. 1820)
- March 8 – Sydney Dacres, British admiral (b. 1804)
- March 13 – Leland Stanford Jr., son of Governor Leland Stanford of California, in whose memory Stanford University was founded (b. 1868)
- March 19 – Elias Lönnrot, Finnish philologist, collector of traditional Finnish oral poetry (b. 1802)
- March 21
  - Ezra Abbot, American Bible scholar (b. 1819)
  - Constantin A. Kretzulescu, 7th prime minister of Romania (b. 1809)
- March 23 – Henry C. Lord, American railroad executive (b. 1824)
- March 28 – Prince Leopold, Duke of Albany, youngest son of Queen Victoria (b. 1853)
- April 1 – Marie Litton, English stage actress (b. 1847)
- April 4 – Marie Bashkirtseff, Russian artist (b. 1858)
- April 6 – Emanuel Geibel, German poet, dramatist (b. 1815)
- April 24 – Marie Taglioni, Swedish-Italian ballerina (b. 1804)
- May 6 – Judah P. Benjamin, American politician, US senator from Louisiana, Cabinet officer of the Confederate States (b. 1811)
- May 12 – Bedřich Smetana, Czech composer (b. 1824)
- May 13 – Cyrus McCormick, American inventor (b. 1809)
- May 29 – Sir Henry Bartle Frere, British colonial administrator (b. 1815)
- June 19
  - Juan Bautista Alberdi, Argentine politician, writer and main Constitution promoter (b. 1810)
  - Johann Gustav Droysen, German historian (b. 1808)
- June 21 – Alexander, Prince of Orange, heir apparent to the Dutch throne (b. 1851)
- June 25 – Hans Rott, Austrian composer (b. 1858)

=== July–December ===
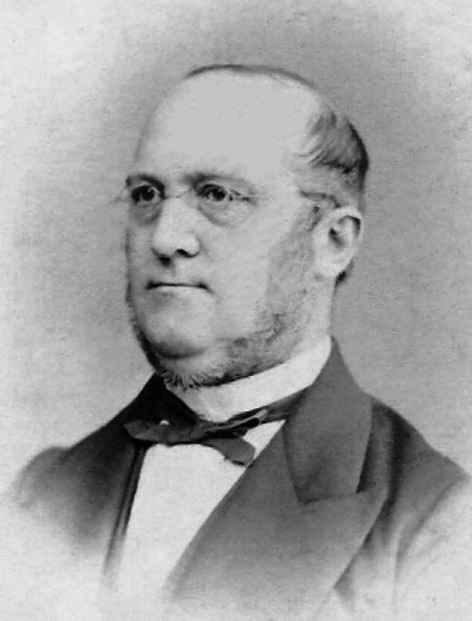
Adolph Wilhelm Hermann Kolbe

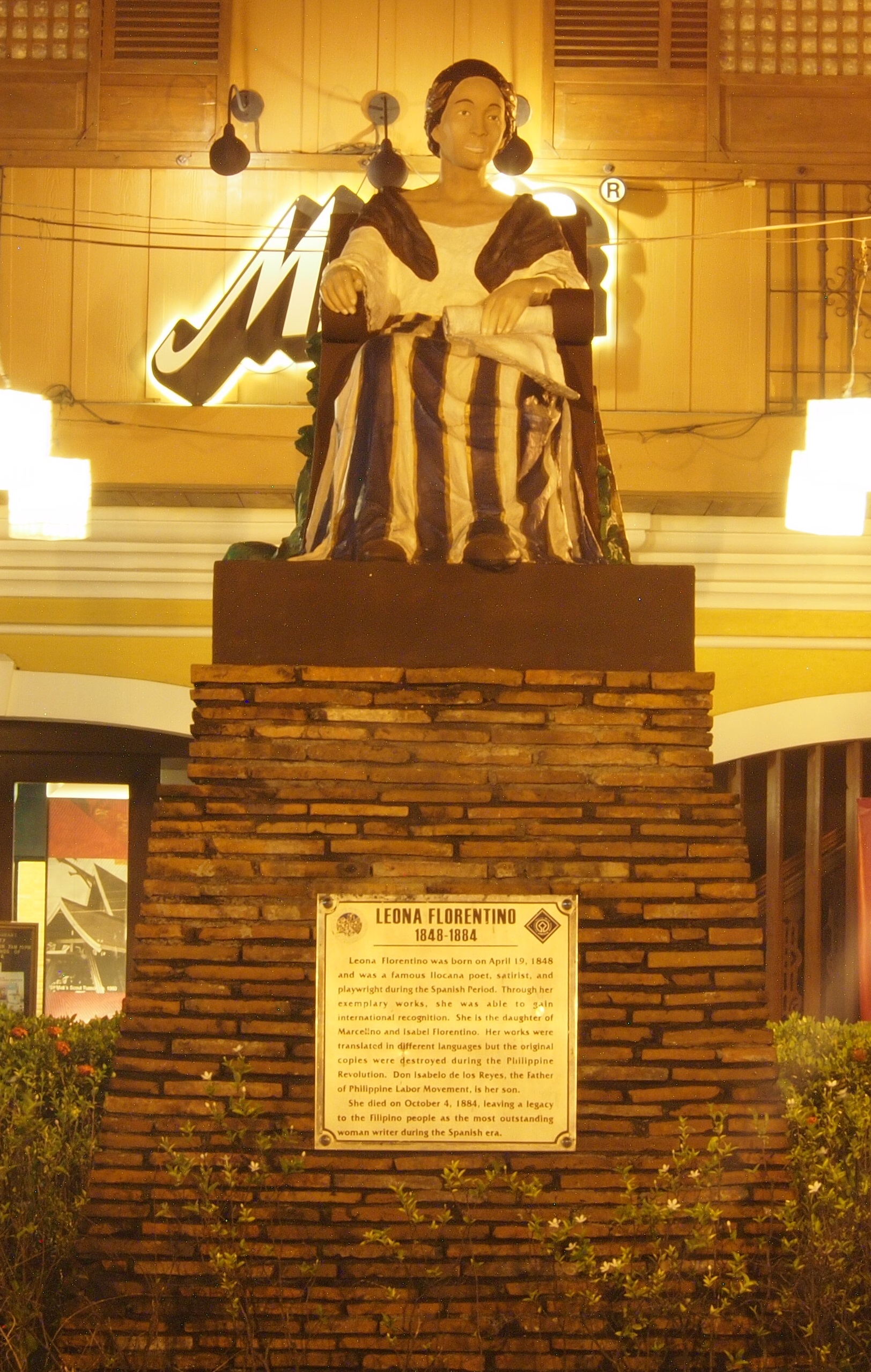
Leona Florentino

- July 1 – Allan Pinkerton, American detective (b. 1819)
- July 10 – Paul Morphy, American chess player (b. 1837)
- July 15
  - Henry Wellesley, 1st Earl Cowley, British diplomat (b. 1804)
  - Almira Hart Lincoln Phelps, American educator, author (b. 1793)
- August 9 – Annestine Beyer, Danish reform pedagogue (b. 1795)
- August 18 – Mary C. Ames, American writer (b. 1831)
- September 2 – Karl Eberhard Herwarth von Bittenfeld, Prussian field marshal (b. 1796)
- September 10 – George Bentham, English botanist (b. 1800)
- October 4 – Leona Florentino, Filipina poet (b. 1849)
- October 7 – Bernard Petitjean, French Roman Catholic missionary to Japan (b. 1829)
- October 16 – Bernice Pauahi Bishop, Hawaiian ali‘i (b. 1831)
- October 18 – William VIII, Duke of Brunswick (b. 1806)
- November 3 – Menyhért Lónyay, 5th prime minister of Hungary (b. 1822)
- November 11 – Alfred Brehm, German zoologist (b. 1829)
- November 16 – František Chvostek, Moravian physician (b. 1835)
- November 25 – Adolph Wilhelm Hermann Kolbe, German chemist (b. 1818)
- December 1 – William Swainson, second, and last, Attorney-General of the Crown Colony of New Zealand (b. 1809)
- December 3 – Jane C. Bonar, Scottish hymnwriter (b. 1821)
- December 20 – Domenico Consolini, Italian Catholic Cardinal (b. 1806)
