= Katherine Preston =

British college head (1868–1951)

- Born: Catherine (sic) Mary McEwen; 30 April 1868; Garvock, Scotland
- Died: 29 May 1951 (aged 65); Rathgar, Ireland
- Education: Alexandra College
- Known for: Head of Alexandra College
- Predecessor: Henrietta White
- Spouse: Thomas Preston

Katherine Preston (30 April 1868 – 29 May 1951) was a British college head of Alexandra College in Ireland.

== Life ==
Preston was born in Garvock at the schoolhouse in Scotland. Her father was the local schoolmaster, Thomas McEwen, and her mother was Eliza Gray (born Mann).

Preston was educated at Alexandra College before going on to gain a masters degree at the Royal University of Ireland in modern languages. She returned to Alexandra College in 1891 to lecture and stayed there until 1895.

In 1900 her husband died leaving her as the mother of two young children. She returned to work at Alexandra College and from 1901 she was employed as an assistant to the head teacher, Henrietta White.

In 1932 Henrietta White decided to retire and Preston reluctantly agreed to take on the role of head. She was known as "Ma P" and she consolidated the improvements that had been made when White was the head.

Preston died in the Rathgar area of Dublin at her home in 1951.
