= Mary Gough =

Mary Gough may refer to:

- Mary de Lellis Gough - an Irish-American nun who became the first Irish woman to earn a PhD in mathematics
- Mary Fisher Gough - an Irish women's rights activist and educator
