= Barbara Corlett =

Founded the first technical college for women in Ireland

- Born: Anne Barbara Corlett c. 1829; Dublin, Ireland
- Died: 25 July 1891; Rathmines, Ireland
- Known for: Women's education

Barbara Corlett (died 25 July 1891) was a pioneer of women's education and founded the first technical college for women in Ireland.

== Career ==
Anne Barbara Corlett was the daughter of Henry Corlett who patented a coach spring in 1867 and was a coach spring manufacturer working in Summerhill. He retired in 1871 and died in 1873. Led by Anne Jellicoe and Corlett a committee of well to do Irish women established a Society for Promoting the Employment of Women on 19 August 1861. They then set up an employment registry for women. The main aim was to highlight the urgent need to provide training for women. The committee established classes in business related skills such as book-keeping, writing, dictating and arithmetic. Jellicoe gained funds through loans and an appeal which enabled them to create the Queen's Institute for the Training and Employment of Educated Women in 1863. Queen Victoria was its patron. In 1865 the name changed to ‘the Queen's Institute of Technical Schools’, due to continued expansion of its facilities and courses.

This was the first technical college for women in either Ireland or Great Britain. It is believed to be the model for similar institutions in Austria.

One difficulty the group faced was the negative connotations of being a working woman and losing the status of gentility. So the college provided classes in painting and decorative arts which was generally assumed to be an appropriate study for women. The Institute had annual exhibitions of the work and the ceramic painting gained the approval of distinguished visitors. Nobility and even royalty supported the Institute by buying the china which included designs for Belleek and Royal Worcester porcelain from 1870 on where some of the mentors were Herbert Cooper and W. H. Kerr.

Corlett was the main person in charge of the Institute especially after Jellicoe left in 1866. The Institute is credited with unprecedented improvements in women's opportunities. The Royal Dublin Society allowed women to use their facilities including the use of the library and the ability to sit examinations for certificates like similar male students. When the civil service accepted women as telegraph operators in 1870 the Institute was officially given the responsibility for training the women for the new roles.

Corlett published a paper on the successes of the Queen's Institute in June 1881 however by 1883 the building it was in was vacant and the Institute had ceased to operate. Corlett died after a protracted illness in 1891. Throughout her life Corbett had been a staunch supporter of women's suffrage and women's rights despite her conservative approach to gentility.
