= Letitia Alice Walkington =

First woman to graduate with a degree of Bachelor of Laws

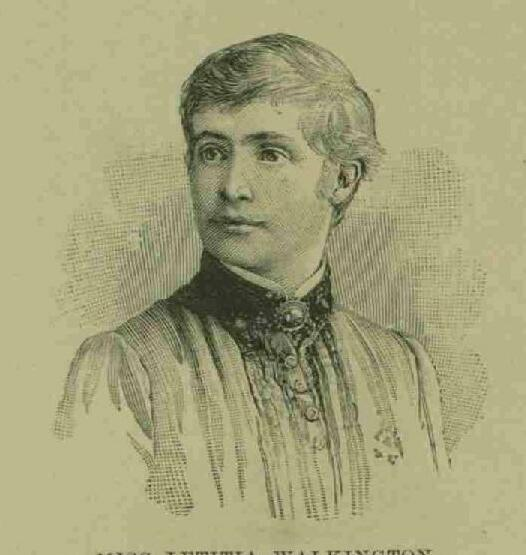
- Born: 1857; Belfast, Ireland
- Died: 28 May 1918 (aged 60–61); Belfast, Ireland
- Education: Royal University of Ireland

Letitia Alice Walkington (c. 1857 – 28 May 1918) was an Anglo-Irish lawyer who was the first woman to graduate with a degree of Bachelor of Laws in Great Britain or Ireland, which she received from the Royal University of Ireland.

== Early life ==
Letitia Alice Walkington was born about 1857 in Belfast and lived most of her life on Belmont Road in Strandtown. She was the daughter of Letitia (née Von Heyn) and Thomas R. Walkington. Her father was a descendant of Anglican Bishop Edward Walkington and her mother was the daughter of Prussian consul and Belfast ship owner, Gustav von Heyn. Letitia had at least one sister, Edith. The family were well connected in the city; in 1913 Edith and Letitia were both left £200 by Gustav Wilhelm Wolff of Harland & Wolff. She did not attend school until she was 16, instead being educated at home by governess. Then she went to boarding schools in England and Paris.

== Education and law ==
Walkington took the matriculation exam to attend the Royal University of Ireland and passed in October 1882. As this was prior to the Irish Universities Act 1908, women who had passed the matriculation exam for the Royal University were also permitted to take classes at Queen's College, Belfast. Her mentor was the barrister Mr. Thomas Harrison. She completed her B.A. in 1885 and her M.A. in 1886, both in the area of Logic, Metaphysic, and Political Economy. She then completed her LL.B. in 1888 and her LL.D in 1889 becoming the first woman to complete these last three degrees.

She was offered several positions from solicitors offices but although she could have completed chamber work, she instead coached other young women for examinations since there were limited opportunities for them in the schools. She did this along with Frances Helena Gray, the only other female law graduate, and Miss Hamilton. Walkington also worked on a device for embossing Braille.

== Women's suffrage ==
She was active in the suffrage movement and the temperance movement. In 1889 Walkington took part in the "Congres International des Oeuvres et Institutions Feminines" in connection with the Paris Exhibition as part of the Dublin Women's Suffrage Committee. She founded the Belfast Women's Suffrage Society in 1912 with Miss Montgomery, which became the Women's Political League in 1918, and helped start the Irish Women's Suffrage Federation. She also served as secretary for the Belfast chapter of the Church League for Women's Suffrage and worked with the Irish Women's Temperance Union. She was working to form a women's voters union shortly before she died.

She died on 28 May 1918 in Belfast and was buried at Knockbreda Cemetery in County Down.
