= Eleanora Fleury =

Irish psychiatrist and early medical graduate

Eleonora Lilian Fleury (1867–1960) sometimes known as Norah Fleury was the first woman to graduate in medicine from the Royal University of Ireland (1890). She was also the first woman member of the Medico Psychological Association (now the Royal College of Psychiatrists), elected in 1894. After graduating medical school, she worked at the Homerton Fever Hospital in London for a year, and then worked at the Richmond Asylum (later called Grangegorman) in Ireland for 27 years, eventually becoming deputy medical director there. From 1921 until 1926 she worked at Portrane Asylum in Donabate, and then she retired. She was arrested in 1921 by Irish state forces for being involved in an assistance and escape program for anti-treaty prisoners which was centred on the asylum at Portrane. After she was released she returned to her work at the asylum.

== Early life and education ==
Eleonora Fleury was born in Manchester in 1867. Her father was Charles Robert Fleury, who was a doctor/surgeon. She was home schooled. She attended the Royal University of Ireland and in 1887 came first in the list of the examinations in medicine and was commended in the Dublin Medical Press. She became the first woman to graduate in medicine from the Royal University of Ireland, with MB first-class honours and a first-class exhibition in 1890 and then MD degree and a Gold Medal in 1893. There were a comparatively large number of women students at the University at this time because Trinity College Dublin did not accept women until 1904. After graduation she attended clinical instruction at the Richmond Hospital, in Dublin and the London School of Medicine for Women for a three-month course of clinical instruction in mental diseases.

== Work ==
Fleury became a successful psychiatrist, as well as the first woman to join the Medico-Psychological Association (MPA), now known as the Royal College of Psychiatrists. Following qualification, she worked at the Homerton Fever Hospital in London for a year before returning to Ireland to work at the Richmond District Asylum at Grangegorman for 27 years. This was the largest asylum in Ireland. She was initially a clinical assistant and her promotion was slow with suggestions that she always ‘passed over for male colleagues’. However, her active involvement with Irish nationalism may also have been a factor. From 1921 she worked at its associated Portrane Asylum, Donabate, (now known as St. Ita's Hospital) and she eventually rose to be the deputy resident medical superintendent. She retired in 1926.

In 1893, she was proposed for membership of the Medico-Psychological Association. Her proposer was Conolly Norman, director of the Richmond District Asylum where she worked and also the president of the Medico-Psychological Association in 1895, and editor of the Journal of Mental Science. Her application was declined on the grounds that the Association rules had to be changed to allow women to become members. In 1894 she was elected by 23 votes to 7. She remained a member until 1924. This made her the first woman psychiatrist in Ireland or Great Britain.

While at the Richmond Asylum she was not only involved in treating patients but she was also with teaching nurses and attendants who were studying for the new certificate of proficiency Mental Nursing. She published scientific papers including Agitated Melancholia in Women, which was read at the 1895 Irish Divisional meeting of the Medico-Psychological Association.

In 1923, she was arrested and imprisoned in Kilmainham Gaol in Dublin. While in prison she served as medical officer to the republican prisoners. She became concerned about the women inmates' medical welfare and after her release she continued to advocate for improved conditions for women prisoners. On her release, she returned to her duties at Portrane.

== Death ==
She lived in Upper Rathmines Road in Dublin and led an active life until her death in 1960. She is buried at Mount Jerome Cemetery in Harold's Cross, Dublin.

== Legacy ==
An exhibition on the Women of the Peninsula or "Mná Na Leithinse" celebrated Fleury's work and achievements during the Bleeding Pig Cultural Festival at the Donabate and Portrane peninsula on 8 March 2017.
