= Thomas Preston (scientist) =

Irish physicist (1860–1900)

Thomas Preston (1860 in Kilmore, County Armagh – 1900) was an Irish scientist whose research was concerned with heat, magnetism, and spectroscopy. He established empirical rules for the analysis of spectral lines, which remain associated with his name. In 1897 he discovered the Anomalous Zeeman Effect, a phenomenon noted when the spectral lines of elements were studied in the presence or absence of a magnetic field. Preston reported, in an important paper published in The Scientific Transactions of The Royal Dublin Society, read on 22 December 1897, and published the following April, that he reported results more complicated than Zeeman had reported. Following this up further, he reported in a second paper in the RDS Scientific Transactions, read on 18 January 1899, and published the following June, that he had found results that were ’very startling’ and appeared ‘quite contrary to all theoretical explanations’. The full explanation had to wait for the theory of relativity and the introduction of quantum mechanics, which were to shake the rigid framework of Newtonian conceptions of absolute time and space. Preston’s results were an important step in this development.

Preston was at the forefront of the Maxwellian research programme led by George Johnstone Stoney and George Francis FitzGerald. Preston famously tackled Stoney in what became a public dispute over a mathematical conclusion in this research programme which concerned electromagnetic and spectroscopic sciences. Stoney who is accredited with naming the electron was in opposition to Preston on this particular matter. John William Strutt, 3rd Baron Rayleigh president of the Royal Dublin Society intervened in this argument in Prestons defence.

He was educated at The Royal School, Armagh, the Royal University of Ireland and Trinity College, Dublin. He enrolled in Trinity College, Dublin, in 1881, working under the physicist George FitzGerald (known for his work in electromagnetics). He received a scholarship in 1884 and graduated as a senior moderator with a BA in mathematics and experimental science in 1885. The previous year he had sat the Royal University of Ireland degree examinations which also earned him a BA from there with a first in mathematical science.

From 1891 to 1900 he was Professor of Natural Philosophy at University College Dublin. He was a Fellow of the Royal University of Ireland and elected a fellow of the Royal Society in 1898 and was a distinguished spectroscopist. His two major textbooks remained in continuous use for over 50 years. While at University College Dublin, he wrote a book, The Theory of Light. In 1899 he won the second Boyle Medal presented by the Royal Dublin Society. He died at his home, Bardowie, Orwell Park, Rathgar, Dublin, on 7 March 1900 of a perforated ulcer just as he was reaching the height of his academic powers.

== Family ==
He was the husband of the college head Katherine Preston. Their children included the physicist Prof George Dawson Preston FRSE (1896-1972).

== Books ==
- A Treatise on Spherical Trigonometry with Application to Spherical Geometry and Numerous Examples (with William J. McClelland) in two volumes, (Macmillan, 1885)
- The Theory of Light (Macmillan, 1890)
- The Theory of Heat (Macmillan, 1894)
