= Lucy Nagle =

American fashion designer

Lucy Nagle is a creative director at Lucy Nagle cashmere, an Irish-based cashmere brand.

== Life and career ==
Nagle started her career in 2013 and launched her brand which was used luxury retailer, Brown Thomas in their yearly CREATE exhibition to highlight Irish designers and allow them to sell their collections in the department store for one week.

In September 2015 her brand was among ten Irish fashion brands which were showcased on the first day of New York fashion week.

In 2019, Nagle was again featured in the CREATE exhibition at Brown Thomas to showcase a capsule knitwear collection.

== Awards ==
In 2015 and again in 2018, Lucy Nagle was nominated for the IMAGE magazine Business Woman of the year awards.

In 2019, she has won the Peter Mark VIP Style Awards.
