= Nine Graces =

First women to receive degrees at the Royal University of Ireland

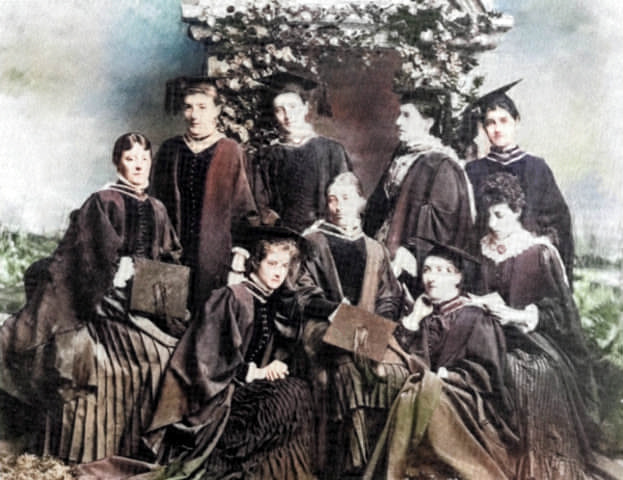
The Nine Graces

The term "The Nine Graces" or Nine Muses referred to the nine women who were the first to be awarded degrees from the Royal University of Ireland in 1884. They were the first women in Great Britain or Ireland to be awarded degrees. Five of the women gained honours and four others also passed. Most of these women had received some of their teaching in Alexandra College.

... the long procession of hooded and gowned male graduates ... the girls coming last. As soon as they appeared, there was a burst of applause. They looked exceedingly well in their black gowns, hoods lined with white fur and tasseled caps, even the plain ones, and the ordinary looking ones appeared to advantage ... The Duke [of Abercorn] arose and made a rather long speech - quoted that hackneyed old line about 'sweet girl graduates'. Jessie Twemlow, Marion Kelly, Miss Sands and the Chief [Isabella Mulvany] looked especially well; not a bit the typical blue stocking which I was glad to see, since Chief Justice Morris having only seen Alice Oldham, pronounced them 'an ugly lot'.

— Mary Hayden, Diaries of Mary T. Hayden, 22 October 1884.

== The Nine Graces ==
1. Isabella Mulvany, headmistress of Alexandra School, activist for women's education
2. Alice Oldham (honours in logic, metaphysics, history of philosophy), activist for women's education, teacher
3. Jessie Twemlow, later Meredith (honours in modern literature)
4. Marion Kelly (honours in modern literature)
5. Annie Mary Sands (Rutland School)
6. Eliza Wilkins
7. Charlotte M. Taylor (honours in music and modern literature)
8. Louisa M. McIntosh (honours in modern literature)
9. Emily E. Eberle

== Other reading ==
- Knowing Their Place: The Intellectual Life of Women in the 19th Century, Professor Brendan Walsh, The History Press, 15 Jul 2014
