= Isabella Mulvany =

Irish educator (1854–1934)

- Born: 4 September 1854; Dublin
- Died: 7 May 1934 (aged 79); Dublin, Ireland

Isabella Maria Jane Mulvany (4 September 1854 – 7 April 1934) was one of the Nine Graces, the first nine women to graduate from university with a degree in either Great Britain or Ireland. She was a pioneer in women's education. She was the head of Alexandra School which prepared girls for entry to Alexandra College.

== Biography ==
Mulvany was born September 1854 on 7 Clanbrassil Terrace in Dublin to Christopher and Isabella Mulvany (née Fowler). Her father was a civil engineer for the Grand Canal Company. Mulvany was educated at home until she was fourteen when she was sent to Alexandra School where she excelled. In 1875 she became secretary to the founder and headmistress, Mrs Anne Jellicoe. In 1880 Mulvany took over as head Mistress for the school which was seven years old. The school was a prep school for Alexandra College. She graduated from the Royal University of Ireland with a BA in 1884.

She continued as head mistress of the Alexandra School. Mulvany became president of the Irish Association of Women Graduates. She wrote a paper and emphasised the importance of the Intermediate Examinations on girls' education and supported girls being put forward to take this examination.

In 1904, Trinity College, Dublin, awarded honorary degrees to three leading Irish women: Isabella Mulvany, President of the Irish Association of Women Graduates; Sophie Bryant, principal of North London Collegiate School; and Jane Barlow, novelist and author of Irish Idylls.

University College Dublin was the last holdout to admitting women students, and Mulvany was one of those leading the movement to get this changed.

She has been seen as a major influence on several of Ireland's leading feminists, revolutionaries and pioneers like Mary Hayden, Alice Oldham and Kathleen Lynn. She remained the principal of Alexandra for 47 years. Trinity College awards the Isabella Mulvany scholarship, founded in 1928 by subscription, to a pupil of Alexandra College, for two years.
