= Alice Oldham =

Irish suffragette and promoter of women's education

- Born: 1850; Dublin, Ireland
- Died: 21 January 1907; Dublin, Ireland
- Education: Royal University of Ireland
- Occupations: Educator, Suffragist
- Notable work: An Introduction to the study of Philosophy

Alice Oldham (1850–1907) was one of the Nine Graces, the first nine women to graduate from University with a degree in either Great Britain or Ireland. Oldham was a leader of the campaign for higher education of women in Ireland and in particular of the campaign to gain admission for women to Trinity College Dublin.

== Biography ==
Oldham was born in Dublin in 1850, to Eldred Oldham, a Dublin linen draper and his wife Anne. Her brother was Charles Hubert Oldham, the first professor of National Economics at University College Dublin. Her sister Edith was a founder member of the Feis Ceoil, Dublin 1896. She was educated at Alexandra College. From 1886 she worked as a teacher there in a wide range of subjects including English, History, Logic, Ethics, Latin and Botany. She graduated from the Royal University of Ireland with a BA in 1884.

Oldham was a member of the Dublin Women's Suffrage Association. Passionate about women's right to equal education, she went with Mrs Byers of Victoria College to London to ensure girls’ schools were included in the Intermediate Education Act. In 1882 she was involved in the founding of the Central Association of Irish School Mistresses to support education for girls and to ensure access to university, hence her resolve in the fight for admission to Trinity College Dublin.

Around the tercentenary of Trinity College Dublin in 1892, the Central Association of Irish School Mistresses became more frequent and focused on the issue of campaigning for Trinity College Dublin degrees to be open to women. Oldham was acting as the honorary secretary of the Association, and so a central part of the campaign. While the association had supporters within Trinity, much of the board and the Provost, George Salmon, were opposed to such a move. Conservative legal advice was issued to the college, which effectively blocked the admission of women and the campaign lost impetus by 1895.

In 1902, she became the first president of the newly formed Irish Association of Women Graduates who worked to achieve coeducation in higher education in Ireland. She was a regular contributor to the monthly The Journal of Education, published in London.

In 1904, Trinity College Dublin finally admitted women to the university and that year awarded Honorary Degrees to three leading Irish women, Isabella Mulvany, President of the Irish Association of Women Graduates, Sophie Bryant, principal of North London Collegiate School, Jane Barlow, novelist and author of Irish Idylls. Despite her perseverance in getting women admitted to Trinity and having achieved a university degree, Oldham was not included in this. Women were subsequently admitted to Trinity just after the death of Provost George Salmon.

She died on 21 January 1907. Her obituary in The Journal of Education, February 1907 stated:

Miss Oldham was widely known and greatly esteemed in Ireland. An effective advocate of the claims of women in all walks of life, she will be deservedly remembered for the splendid work which she rendered to the higher education of women.

Posthumously, in 1909, a book of her lectures entitled An Introduction to the study of Philosophy was published.

== Memorials ==
The Alice Oldham Memorial Prize was founded by subscription, in 1908, in memory of Oldham. It is awarded biennially in even years to the student judged to be the most distinguished of the women students and who attended Alexandra College.

Oldham House at Trinity Hall is named after her.
