= Mary Fisher Gough =

Irish women's activist, teacher, and promoter of women's education (1832–1896)

- Born: 9 May 1832
- Died: 29 December 1896 (aged 64); Dublin, Ireland
- Occupations: Women's activist, teacher, promoter of women's education
- Employer(s): The Queen's Institute, Dublin

Mary Fisher Gough (9 May 1832 – 29 December 1896) was an Irish women's activist, teacher, and promoter of women's education.

== Life ==
Mary Fisher Gough was born on 9 May 1832, one of five children born to Josiah Richard Gough and Deborah Fisher. She lived, died, and was probably born in Dublin.

Gough was a signatory to the 1866 petition for women's suffrage, alongside her mother and sister. The Goughs were Quakers, it had been through the network of the Society of Friends that support for suffrage in Ireland had first been rallied. Though she continued to support women's suffrage throughout her life, and likely signed subsequent petitions, her obituary stated that Gough ultimately refused to sign future petitions for the vote because "she would not condescend to go on begging for it". She was said to believe suffrage to be "a just right".

Gough was especially active in the cause of women's education, and a supporter of the Queen's Institute in Dublin – the first technical college for women in Europe. She taught scrivenery there for two decades, 1860–80, the life of the Institute. Gough also ran the stationery kiosk there. In her entry on Gough for Oxford Dictionary of National Biography, Kathryn Gleadle described her "teaching of such a vocational course" as being "suggestive of her progressive ideas concerning female employment".

In her later years, due to paralysis, Gough was forced to support her causes less actively. Nonetheless she "followed all the movements for women and the great questions of the day with an interest befitting a disciple of Mary Wollstonecraft, Margaret Fuller and John Stuart Mill".

Gough died at home in Dublin on 29 December 1896. The Englishwoman's Review remembered her as an "early worker for the cause of women" who "gave it [the fight for the vote] her help wherever she could".
