= Alexandra College =

Independent day and boarding school for girls, Dublin, Ireland

- Coláiste Alexandra

Location
- Milltown, Dublin; Ireland; 53.310527°N 6.249871°W

Information
- Type: Private day and boarding school
- Religious affiliations: Church of Ireland; Formerly Quakerism
- Founded: 1866; 160 years ago
- Founder: Ann Jellicoe
- School code: 60910F
- Principal: Barbara Ennis
- Gender: Girls
- Age range: 3 – 19
- Language: English
- Colours: Red and white
- Website: alexandracollege.eu

Alexandra College (Irish: Coláiste Alexandra) is a private day and boarding school for girls in Milltown, Dublin, Ireland. The school operates under a Church of Ireland ethos.

== History ==
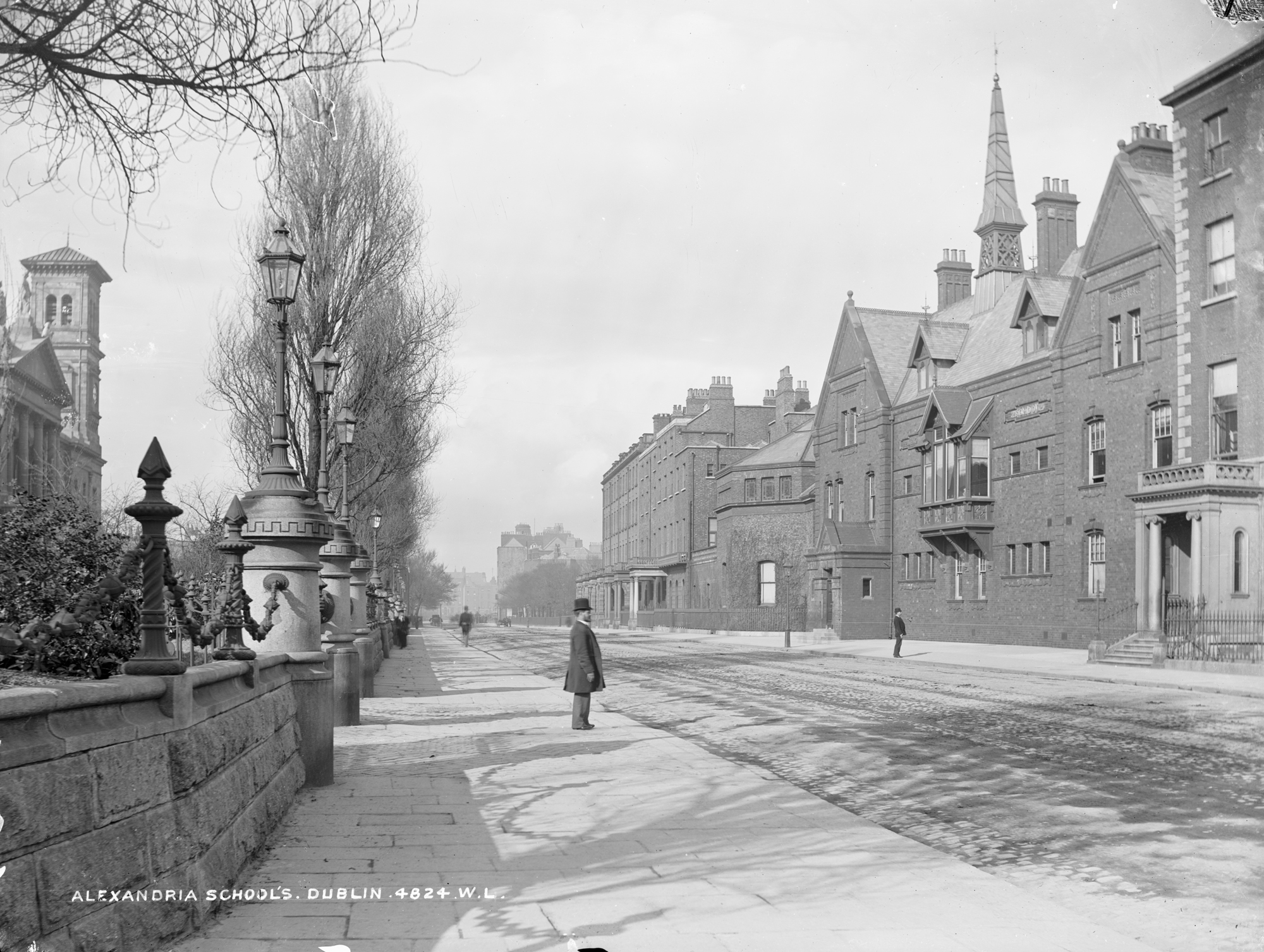
Alexandra College (on right) c. 1890

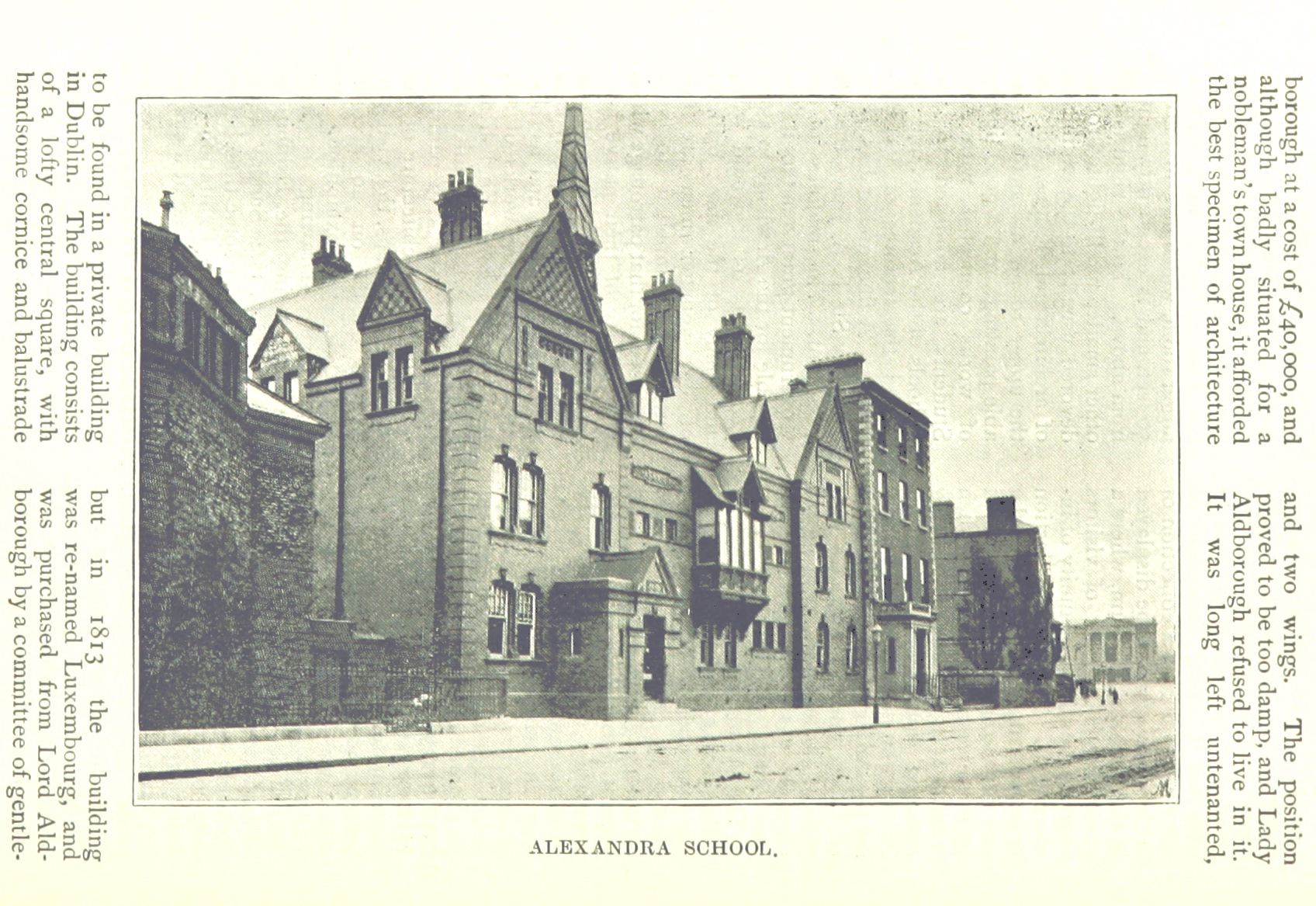
Alexandra College, Earlsfort Terrace c1895

The school was founded in 1866 and takes its name from Princess Alexandra of Denmark, the school's patron. The school colours, red and white, were adopted from the Danish flag in her honour. Alexandra College was founded by Ann Jellicoe, a Quaker educationist, in the name of furthering women's education. Under Ann Jellicoe, and then later Henrietta White, the school grew from a small establishment focused on providing a governess-style education to Irish Protestant ladies into a pioneering force for women's rights and education, providing an education to women equivalent to that available in boys' schools, with a grounding in mathematics, history, classics and philosophy. As Alexandra settled into its role, Ann Jellicoe was convinced that a major obstacle to the liberal education of women was their exclusion from the university campus. She passionately believed that until women were admitted to Trinity College Dublin (founded in 1592), the voice of women would not commonly be heard in politics, literature or in academic debate.

The Royal University of Ireland Act 1879 allowed females to take university degrees on the same basis as males. Students were prepared for the examinations (including degree examinations) of the Royal University. Susan Parkes, co-author of Gladly Learn and Gladly Teach, a history of Alexandra College (1866–1966), is quoted as saying: "In the late 1800s, lecturers from Trinity College Dublin provided tuition for ladies on the Alexandra campus. And the first women to receive degrees in Ireland or Britain were Alex pupils — six of them successfully studied at Dublin's Royal University from 1891 and at Trinity College Dublin, once it opened its doors to women in 1903."

The school was originally in Earlsfort Terrace, across from what is now the National Concert Hall. By 1879, a new hall and theatre were constructed alongside. Over time, the school acquired several more houses and by 1889 a new building by William Kaye-Parry was constructed next door to the college as Alexandra School. The school moved out to its sports grounds in the 1970s in order to accommodate more students. The original buildings were subsequently demolished and the site remained vacant for over two decades. The Conrad Hotel and office buildings were later erected on the site.

Patrick Pearse, the leader of the Easter Rising, was once employed as an Irish language teacher.

== Religion ==
Alexandra College is under Church of Ireland management, and the Archbishop of Dublin (who presides over the United Dioceses of Dublin and Glendalough) currently acts as chairman of the school council. The students are addressed weekly by a female minister, and a school assembly is held daily at which Church of Ireland hymns are sung and which finish with the extended version of The Lord's Prayer.

== Junior School ==
The junior school is private and receives no subvention from the Department of Education and Skills. The junior school is run in accordance with Froebelian principles, follows the national curriculum and provides a number of specialised subjects, such as art, French, individual music instrument lessons, speech and drama and a wide array of sports as part of its strong extra and co-curricular programme.

== Sport ==
The school fields teams in various sports including women's association football, basketball, cricket, tennis and track and field athletics. The school has a long history of playing field hockey. In 1893 the Alexandra Hockey Club was founded at the school. It claims to be the oldest field hockey club in Ireland. In 1947 it was renamed Old Alexandra Hockey Club. In 1960 the club opened its membership to all players while still retaining a close relationship with the school. The club is still based at the school. The Irish Ladies Hockey Union was established in 1894, following a meeting at Alexandra College. On 2 March 1896 the school also hosted the first ever women's international field hockey match when Ireland defeated England 2–0.

When Ireland won the silver medal at the 2018 Women's Hockey World Cup, the squad included three former Alexandra College pupils – Nicola Evans, Deirdre Duke and Emily Beatty. All three represented the school in Leinster Schoolgirls' Senior Cup finals. Alexandra College are the competitions most successful team, winning the cup for the thirteenth time in 2016.

Recent finals

Year	Winners	Result	Runners up
2016	Alexandra College	4–2	St Gerard's School, Bray
2015	St Gerard's School, Bray	1–0	Alexandra College
2012	Alexandra College	4–1	Wesley College
2011	Alexandra College	2–1 (Note: Alexandra College win with silver goal in extra time.)	St. Andrew's College
2010	St. Andrew's College	2–0	Alexandra College
2008	Loreto, Beaufort	2–1	Alexandra College
2007	Alexandra College	5–0	St. Andrew's College
2005	Alexandra College	4–2	The High School, Dublin
2004	St. Andrew's College		Alexandra College

NotesSource:

== Academics ==
The school was ranked seventh in Ireland in terms of the number of students who progressed to third level and by the types of institutions to which the students progressed.

== The Guild ==
The Guild was founded in 1897, not only to form a bond of union between past and present students and staff, and to keep them in touch with the College, but to serve the community and undertake social and philanthropic work. One of the founding members was Hannah Moylan. The Guild has several branches worldwide. Facets of the Guild include the Alexandra College Golfing Society, the Old Alexandra Hockey Club, Alexandra Guild House and the Alexandra College Bursaries, which supports 25 women throughout the country and assists families in need around Dublin and elsewhere.

== Notable past pupils ==
- Rachel Allen (b. 1972), celebrity chef
- Ivana Bacik (b. 1968), academic and politician
- Mary Bagot Stack (1883–1935), exercise innovator
- Beulah Bewley, (1929–2018), public health physician
- Helen Chenevix, (1886–1963), social activist
- Susan Denham, (b. 1945), judge
- Grace Gifford, (1888–1955), artist and activist
- Kathleen Goodfellow (1891-1980), poet, writer and literary translator
- Rosemary Henderson, (b. 1961), actor
- Maeve Kyle, (b. 1928), athlete
- Kathleen Isabella Mackie (1899–1996) painter and glider pilot
- Catherine McGuinness, (b. 1934), judge
- Kate Meyrick, (1875–1933), night-club owner
- Igerna Sollas, (1877–1965), zoologist
- Lucy Nagle, designer
- Simone Rocha (b. 1986), designer
- Barbara Warren (1925–2017), painter
