= Royal University of Ireland =

Former university in Ireland (1879-1909)

- Ollscoil Ríoga na hÉireann
- Former names: Catholic University of Ireland; Queen's University of Ireland
- Type: Public
- Active: 1879–1909
- Location: Belfast, Cork, Derry, Dublin, Galway, Maynooth, Ireland

The Royal University of Ireland was a university in Ireland that existed from 1879 to 1909. It was founded in accordance with the University Education (Ireland) Act 1879 as an examining and degree-awarding university based on the model of the University of London. A royal charter was issued on 27 April 1880 and examinations were open to candidates irrespective of attendance at college lectures. The first chancellor was the Irish chemist Robert Kane.

The Royal University had premises in Dublin, Belfast, Cork, Limerick, Galway and Derry.

It was dissolved in 1909 after a series of reforms and its functions and premises were then inherited by the National University of Ireland and Queen's University Belfast.

The Royal University became the first university in Ireland that could grant degrees to women on a par with those granted to men. The first nine women students graduated in 1884. It granted its first degree to a woman on 22 October 1884 to Charlotte M. Taylor (Bachelor of Music). In 1888 Letitia Alice Walkington became the first woman in Great Britain or Ireland to receive a degree of Bachelor of Laws. Among the honorary degree recipients of the university was Douglas Hyde, founder of the Gaelic League and later President of Ireland, who was awarded a DLitt in 1906.

== Establishment ==
The Royal University of Ireland was the successor to the Queen's University of Ireland, dissolved in 1882, and the graduates, professors, students and colleges of that predecessor were transferred to the new university. In addition to the Queen's Colleges, Magee College, University College Dublin, Cecillia St. Medical School, St. Patrick's College, Maynooth and Blackrock College presented students for examinations as well, and no special status was accorded to the colleges of the former Queen's University. After the 1880 reforms Catholic Colleges such as Carlow College, Holy Cross College and Blackrock College ("The French College") came under the Catholic University, and with a number of other seminaries presented students for examination by the RUI.

External students at colleges that were not approved could sit examinations of the Royal University (and many did so) although they were considered at a disadvantage to those from designated colleges whose professors were part of the university.

In fact, many schools, including convent schools (such as Dominican College, Eccles St, Dublin; Alexandra College, Dublin; Loreto College, St Stephen's Green, Dublin; Methodist College, Belfast; High School for Girls, Derry; St Columb's College, Derry; Mungret College, Limerick; Rutland School, Mountjoy Square, Dublin; Dominican College, Sion Hill, Dublin; St. Angela's College, Cork; St Stanislaus College SJ;St Louis's, Monaghan; Presentation Brothers College, Cork; Christian Brothers College, Cork; Rochelle College, Cork) prepared students for the examinations (including degree examinations) of the Royal University.

Like the Queen's University, the Royal University was entitled to grant any degree, similar to that of any other university in the United Kingdom of Great Britain and Ireland, except in theology. The colleges themselves would award degrees in theology and divinity.

The professorships and Senate of the Royal University were shared equally between Catholics and Protestants. However, colleges of the university maintained full independence except in the awarding of degrees, and the compilation and enforcement of academic regulations and standards.

The members of the Senate of the Royal University included Gerald Molloy, William Joseph Walsh, John Healy, the Marquess of Dufferin and Ava, George Arthur Hastings Forbes, 7th Earl of Granard, Anthony Nugent, 11th Earl of Westmeath, Daniel Mannix and George Johnston Allman.

== Chancellors ==
- Robert Kane, chemist, appointed 1880
- William Monsell, 1st Baron Emly (1885–1894 )
- Reginald Brabazon, 12th Earl of Meath (1902–1906)
- Bernard FitzPatrick, 2nd Baron Castletown (1906–1910)

== Notable fellows ==
- Thomas Preston, scientist
- William P Coyne, economist
- Gerard Manley Hopkins, poet

== Notable graduates ==
A high number of graduates of the university for the time were women (the first nine in 1884) because Trinity College Dublin did not accept female students until 1904.

- Thomas Joseph Campbell – BA (1892), LL.B (1894), MA(1897), BL.
- Arthur W. Conway – BA (1896) – President of University College Dublin (1940–1947).
- Éamon de Valera – Mathematics (1904), Taoiseach and President of Ireland
- Alexander Ernest Donnelly
- William Egan – M.B. Bch. B.A.O. Royal Army Medical Corp. World War I – Major DSO OBE
- Eleanora Fleury – MB MD, first woman medical graduate in 1893 later working as psychiatrist
- Mary Hayden – BA in 1885, and MA in Modern Languages in 1887
- Marie Elizabeth Hayes – MB BCh BAO, Doctor and Anglican missionary, educated through the Catholic University of Ireland Medical School
- John Hooper (Irish statistician) – BA (1898) – first Director of the Statistics Branch of the Department of Industry and Commerce in Ireland
- Douglas Hyde – Honorary Degree
- James Joyce BA Modern Languages (1902)
- Kathleen Lynn – Medicine (1899)
- Eoin MacNeill – Irish scholar and Sinn Féin politician
- Isabella Mulvany BA (1884) – Principal of Alexandra College.
- Kathleen O'Callaghan – A founder member of Cumann na mBan, and Sinn Féin TD.
- Agnes O'Farrelly BA (1899), MA (1900) – Professor of modern Irish in UCD (1932–1947)
- James O'Mara BA (1898) – Irish Parliamentary Party MP, and Sinn Féin MP for Kilkenny South.
- Alice Oldham BA, campaigned for women to be admitted to Trinity College Dublin.
- Pádraig Pearse – BA Modern Languages (1901)
- Thomas Preston, scientist and discoverer the Anomalous Zeeman Effect, among other achievements
- Hanna Sheehy-Skeffington – BA (1899), MA (1902)
- Letitia Alice Walkington – BA (1885), MA (1886), LLB (1888), LLD (1889)
- Cardinal D'Alton – Archbishop of Armagh and Primate of All Ireland 1946–1963

== Dissolution ==
Irish Universities Act 1908 (Note: Section 21(2).)
- Act of Parliament
- Parliament of the United Kingdom
- Long title: An Act to make further provision with respect to University Education in Ireland.
- Citation: 8 Edw. 7. c. 38
- Territorial extent: Ireland (Note: Long title.)

Dates
- Royal assent: 1 August 1908
- Commencement: 1 August 1908 (Note: The Acts of Parliament (Commencement) Act 1793.)
- Repealed: 1 January 1982 (Note: The Queen's University of Belfast (1981 Order) (Commencement) Order (Northern Ireland) 1981 (SI 1981/404).)
Other legislation
| Amends | Royal University of Ireland Act 1881 |
| Repeals/revokes | Queen's College (Ireland) Act 1845; University Education (Ireland) Act 1879 |
| Amended by | Medical Act 1956; Pensions (Increase) Act 1971 |
| Repealed by | Queen's University of Belfast (Northern Ireland) Order 1981 |

Status: Repealed

Text of statute as originally enacted

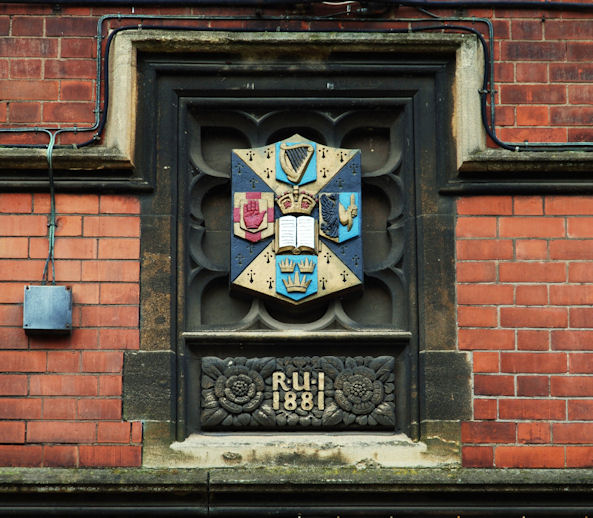
The arms of the Royal University of Ireland on the southern side of the quadrangle at Queen's University Belfast

On 31 October 1909 the Royal University was dissolved; the National University of Ireland and Queen's University Belfast took over its functions under the Irish Universities Act 1908 (8 Edw. 7. c. 38), which provided for the transfer of graduates, staff and students to one or the other of these new universities. The final degree congregation of the Royal University of Ireland in 1909 involving 350 students was accompanied by demonstrations in favour of the Irish language being compulsory for the new National University.

== Arms ==
Coat of arms of Royal University of Ireland
| Notes Granted 11 October 1881 by Sir John Bernard Burke, Ulster King of Arms. Escutcheon Per saltire Ermine and Ermines an open book Proper clasped and surmounted by the royal crown Or between four escutcheons two in pale and two in fess the escutcheons in pale representing respectively the arms of the Provinces of Leinster (Vert an Irish harp Or stringed Argent) and Munster (Azure three antique crowns Or) the escutcheons in fess representing respectively the arms of the Provinces of Ulster (Or a cross Gules on an escutcheon Argent a dexter hand couped also Gules) and Connaught (per pale Argent and Azure on the dexter a dimidiated eagle displayed Sable and on the sinister conjoined therewith at the shoulder a sinister arm embowed Proper sleeved of the first holding a sword erect also Proper). |

== See also ==
- List of split up universities
