= Symon Semeonis =

14th-century Irish pilgrim

Symon Semeonis OFM
- Síomón Mac Síomóin
- Other name: Simon FitzSimon(s)
- Citizenship: Lordship of Ireland
- Occupation: Franciscan friar
- Years active: 1320s
- Notable work: Itinerarium Symonis Semeonis ab Hybernia ad Terram Sanctam

Symon Semeonis (fl. 1322–1324; also Simon FitzSimon or Simon FitzSimmons) was a 14th-century Irish Franciscan friar and author.

== Biography ==
Of Hiberno-Norman origin, Semeonis was the author of Itinerarium fratrum Symonis Semeonis et Hugonis illuminatoris (The Itinerary of Brother Symon Semeonis and Hugo Illuminator). In 1323 he and his companion friar, Hugo Illuminator (Hugh the Illuminator), undertook a pilgrimage from Clonmel in Ireland to Jerusalem. In his manuscript account, he described his experiences and encounters during that journey.

His encounter with a migrant group he called ‘the descendants of Cain’ outside the town of Heraklion (Candia) in Crete is probably the earliest surviving description by a Western chronicler of the Romani people in Europe. The account of his experiences in what is now Greece is also one of the earliest written reports of that land to reach Britain.

He received a special passport for mendicants from Sultan Al-Nasir Muhammad at a reduced fee. This passport was apparently authenticated by the application of the Sultan's fingerprints. The original manuscript is currently held as MS 407 in the Library of Corpus Christi College, Cambridge.

His surname is now rendered FitzSimon, FitzSimmonds, or Simmonds, and still found in Ireland.

== Journey ==
Fitzsimons described a detailed itinerary. Starting from Clonmel, he did not say how he left Ireland, but the fact that he entered Wales at Holyhead makes his departure via Dublin a near-certainty; even today, Dublin–Holyhead is an active ferry route. From Clonmel, the road went north to Roscrea, and then Fitzsimons could follow the Slighe Dála ("Way of the Assembly") east to Abbeyleix, and then northeastwards through Naas, Tallaght and Dublin.

From Holyhead, his party continued eastwards across North Wales. They then followed Watling Street down through England to Canterbury, leaving via Dover — not to Calais, but to Wissant. They continued south across France to Paris, then down the Seine to Châtillon, crossing overland to Beaune and then down the Saône and Rhône to Marseille.

During his journey through Eastern Europe, Symon Semeonis started to pay more attention to inhabitants and local customs, which led him to mention and briefly describe Romani people who he encountered in Crete. This is the first known mention of the Romani people in Europe.

Places in Europe visited by Symon Semeonis on his pilgrimage
Places in Egypt and the Levant visited by Symon Semeonis on his pilgrimage
The pilgrimage of Symon Semeonis. Towns and cities are called by their modern names.

== See also ==
- James of Ireland (fl.1316-1330), companion of Odoric of Pordenone, travelled to Sumatra and China.

== Sources ==
- Itinerarium Symonis Semeonis Ab Hybernia Ad Terrum Sanctam, ed. and translated by Mario Esposito, Dublin, 1960.
- A New History of Ireland, volume one, pp. 453, 460.
- An Early Irish Visitor to the Island of Crete by Conn Murphy, UCC, at Classics Ireland.
- The itineraries of Fr. Simon Fitzsimons-1322-23 and others. Thomas Brygg. (Scroll to last PDF entry)
- Two Irish Travellers in Albania in 1322
- M. Esposito, Itinerarium Symonis Semeonis ab Hybernia ad Terram Sanctam, Dublin, The Dublin Institute for Advanced Studies, 1960
- G.Golubovich, Biblioteca Bio-bibliografica della Terra Santa e dell’Oriente Francescano, III, Florence, Collegio di S. Bonaventura, 1919
- Agustí Justicia Lara (2020). "The Corpus Islamolatinum as Auctoritas in the Polemical Discourse of Symon Semeonis" in Propaganda and (un)covered identities in treatises and sermons: Christians, Jews, and Muslims in the premodern Mediterranean (ed. Cándida Ferrero). Universitat Autònoma de Barcelona Servei de Publicacions, Bellaterra. pp. 41–54
- Agustí Justicia Lara (2020). "The mirabilia of the Mediterranean Basin in the Itinerarium Symonis Semeonis" in The mirabilia of the Mediterranean Basin
