= Ewart Milne =

Irish poet (1903–1987)

A portrait of Ewart Milne by Cecil F. Salkkeld, as it appears in Milne's book Forty North Fifty West

Ewart Milne (25 May 1903 – 14 January 1987) was an Irish poet who described himself on various book jackets as "a sailor before the mast, ambulance driver and courier during the Spanish Civil War, a land worker and estate manager in England during and after World War 2" and also "an enthusiast for lost causes – national, political, social and merely human".

== Life ==
He was born in Dublin, of English and Welsh-Irish parents, and was educated at Christchurch Cathedral Grammar School. In 1920 he signed on as a seaman and worked on boats, off and on, until 1935. During the 30s too he began writing and had his first poems published in 1935. That year, Milne was one of the three founders of a duplicated publication called Irish Front, together with two other poets, Charles Donnelly (poet) and Leslie Daiken.

The background to the Spanish Civil War contributed to his political awakening and he came to England to work as a voluntary administrator for the Spanish Medical Aid Committee in London, for whom he often acted as a medical courier. Milne has also described how he was once unwillingly involved in some arms deal while visiting Spain on their behalf.

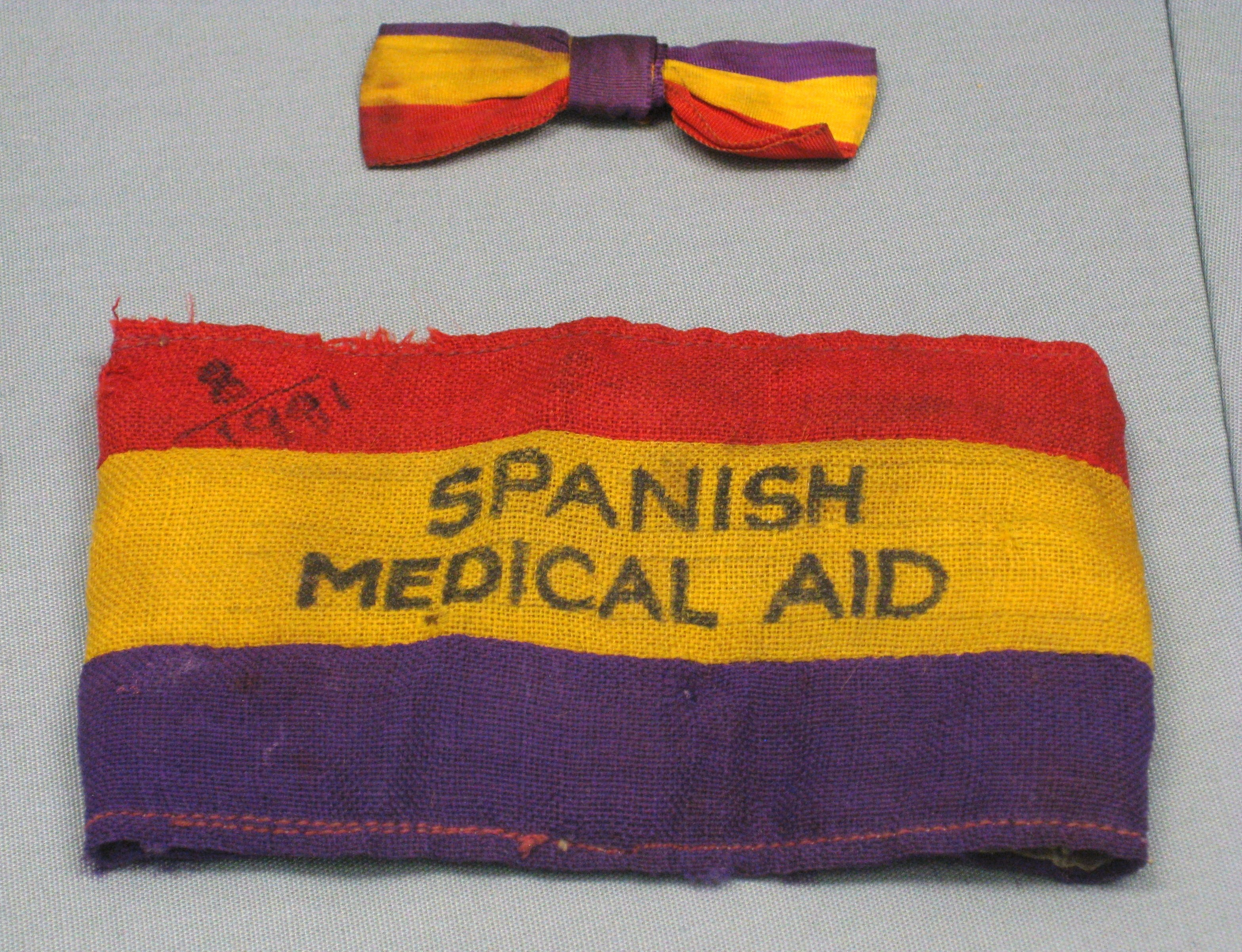
Spanish Medical Aid Armband

Arthur Peacock, a British volunteer in the International Brigades wrote:

I recall the quiet and valuable work of the young raven-haired poet from the Wicklow Hills, Ewart Milne, who worked long hours packing parcels of bandages, hypodermic needles and sterilizers and who travelled backwards and forwards across France with our convoys. During these missions Ewart Milne wrote some of his best stories and poems.

After SMA was wound up, Milne returned to Ireland but remained politically active in support of the campaign for the release of Frank Ryan, the leader of the Connolly Column of Irish volunteers on the Republican side, who had been captured and imprisoned in Spain. At one point Milne took part in a delegation to Westminster seeking Labour Party support for this. In August 1938 he was reported in The Worker's Republic as being one of the 12 member committee of the James Connolly Irish club in London.

During his time in England and Spain, Milne got to know the left-leaning poets who supported the Republican cause, including W. H. Auden, Stephen Spender and Cecil Day-Lewis. In 1938 his first collection of poems, Forty North Fifty West, was published in Dublin, followed by two others in 1940 and 1941. Having taken a pro-British line in neutral Ireland, he was informed by Karl Petersen, the German press attache in Dublin, that he was on the Nazi death list. This decided him to help in the British war effort and he returned to England with the help of John Betjeman (then working at the British embassy in Ireland).

Between 1942 and 1962 he was resident in England and an active presence on the English literary scene. In particular he became associated with the poets grouped around the magazine Nine, edited by Peter Russell and Ian Fletcher. He and his wife Thelma also backed the young Irish poet Patrick Galvin when he launched his own magazine, Chanticleer. This generous encouragement of younger writers was later extended to several others, including John F. Deane, Gerald Dawe and Maurice Scully.

Milne regarded his return to Dublin in 1962 as a disaster, overshadowed as his four-year stay was by quarrels with the establishment, the discovery of betrayal by a friend and the death of his wife from lung cancer. The misery of those events is recorded in Time Stopped (1967); the artistic frustration of the time also resulted in the poems included in Cantata Under Orion (1976). Returning to England in 1966, he settled in Bedford, where he died of a heart attack early in 1987. Politically he remained involved and spoke alongside Auberon Waugh at the rally on behalf of Biafra in 1968, but his views moved further to the right in later years. He wrote to The Irish Times on 13 April 1976, saying that he'd been "taken in by Stalin and that Leninism is Satanism"; he also sided with the Loyalist position in the Ulster conflict.

Milne was twice married, first to Kathleen Ida Bradner in 1927, by whom he had two sons; then in 1948 to Thelma Dobson, by whom he had two more sons.

== Poetry ==
Milne "set himself against the Celtic Twilight school which had dominated his youth", as The Times obituary put it, much as Yeats's later poetry sought to undo the twilit fashion set by his own earlier verse. In addition, Milne frequently entered into a poetic dialogue with his contemporaries, but besides Yeats these included Ezra Pound, Dylan Thomas and Sylvia Plath, among many others. In reality, the Irish sources that inspired Milne were quite other than Yeats.

Both in his conversation and in his poetry, Milne used to complain of being passed over because of his dual heritage: "The English see I am not English...To the Irish I am Anglo." He resisted categorisation, and his changes of residence back and forth across the Irish Sea only added to the problem. From the 1970s onwards, the part he had played during the Spanish Civil War brought his name back into notice and continues to do so. The poems he wrote on the subject were largely confined to a section in his second book, Letter from Ireland (1940). These were supplemented by the autobiographically based stories he wrote at the time, only three of which were published in the 1930s; they and the remaining four, plus a later account of his involvement in a gun-running deal, appeared only in 1985 (Drums Without End, Isle of Skye).

Milne's poetry was very varied and included the slight, the serious and the sexy. At its best it employed a fluent long-lined narrative, a rhythmically driven rhetoric. There are good examples of this, and of several jeux d'esprit, in his two best-known volumes of selected poems: Diamond Cut Diamond (London 1950) and A Garland for the Green (London 1962). Selection for the latter was left to Patrick Galvin and Thelma Milne prior to the move back to Dublin and overemphasises the Irish side of his writing. In later years his poetry became increasingly more autobiographical.

Milne's 80th birthday was celebrated by the publication of a book of poems largely centred on his youth, The Folded Leaf (Aquila, Isle of Skye, 1983), as well as a special issue of the literary magazine Prospice (#14) and an hour-long poetry reading that he gave in Dublin. He was working to complete another collection, The Broken Arcs, just before his death, but it was never published.

== Books ==
Poetry:

- Forty North Fifty West (Dublin: Gayfield 1938 with six woodcuts by Cecil Salkeld)
- Letter from Ireland: Verses (Dublin: Gayfield Press 1940), ix, 79pp
- Listen Mangan: Poems (Dublin: Sign of Three Candles 1941), 102pp
- Jubilo: Poems (London: F. Muller Ltd. 1944), vi, 47, [1]pp
- Boding Day (London: F. Muller Ltd. 1947), 22p
- Diamond Cut Diamond: Selected Poems (London: Bodley Head 1950), 64pp
- Elegy for a Lost Submarine (Burnham-on-Crouch: Plow Poems 1951), [8]pp
- Galion: a mock epic with prologue and epilogue (Dublin: Dolmen 1953, title page illustrated by Mia Cranwill)
- Life Arboreal: Poems (Tunbridge Wells: Pound Press 1953), 94, [2]pp
- Once More to Tourney: A Book of Ballads and Light Verse, Serious, Gay and Grisly, intro. by J. M. Cohen (London: Linden Press [1958]), 96pp
- A Garland for the Green: Poems (London: Hutchinson 1962), 95pp
- Time Stopped: A Poem Sequence with Prose Intermissions (London: Plow Poems 1967), 165pp
- Cantata Under Orion (Isle of Skye: Aquila Poetry 1976), 54pp
- Drift of Pinions (Isle of Skye: Aquila & Wayzgoose Press 1976), [16]pp
- The Black Lady, Poetry Ireland poems No. 14, December 1979, [1]p
- Deus Est Qui Regit Omnia [St. Beuno's Hand Printed Ltd. Edns. No. 9] (Mornington: J. F. & B. Deane 1980), [16]pp
- Spring Offering (Isle of Skye: Aquila 1981)
- The Folded Leaf: Poems 1970–1980 (Isle of Skye: Aquila Poetry 1983), 69pp

Prose:

- Drums Without End (Portree [Isle of Skye]: Aquila 1985), 101pp.
