= Mario Esposito =

Mario Esposito may refer to:

- Mario Esposito (scholar)
- Mario Esposito (archer)
