= Emanuel de Beaupuis =

Italian pianist

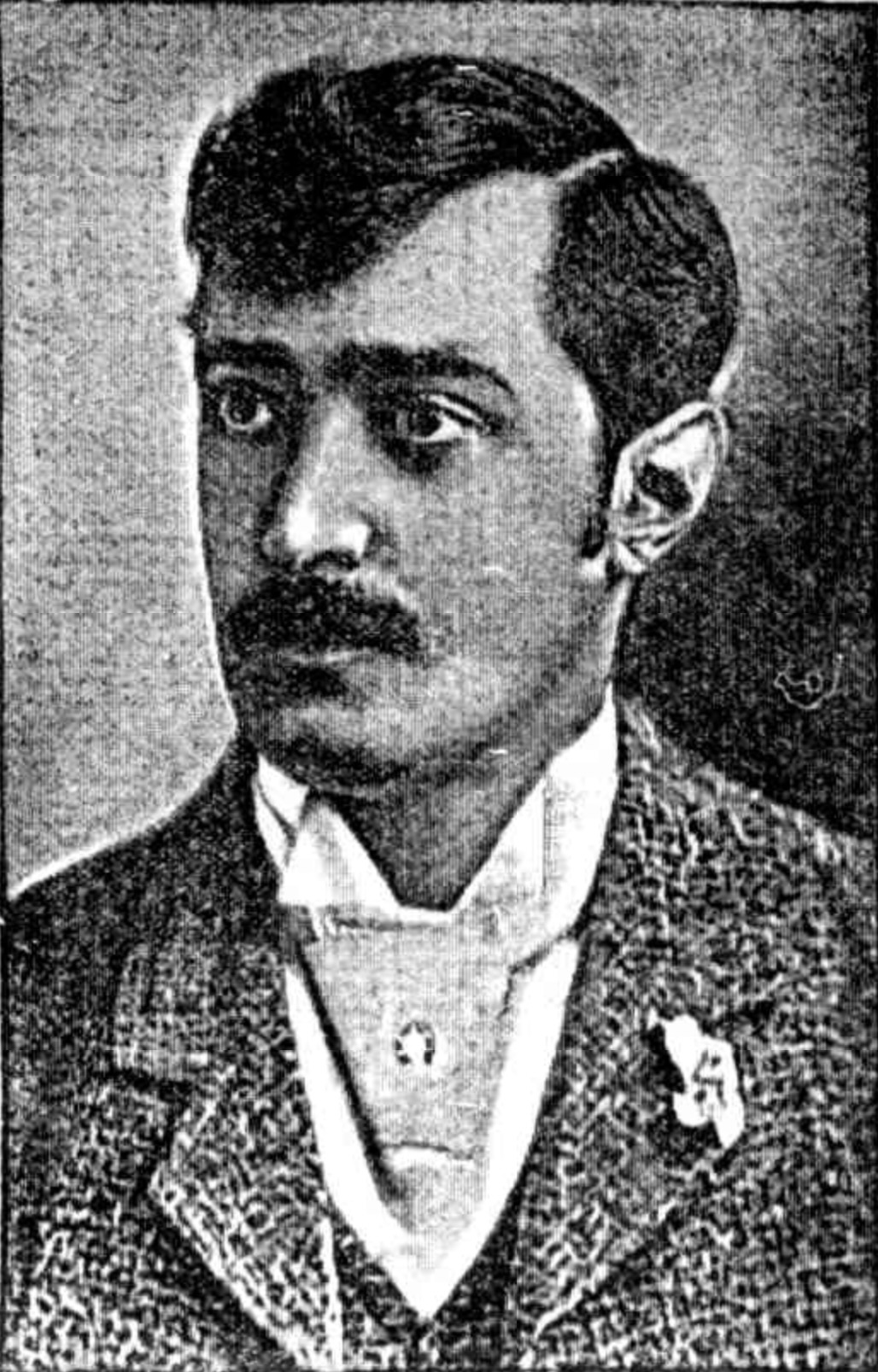
Emanuel de Beaupuis in 1895

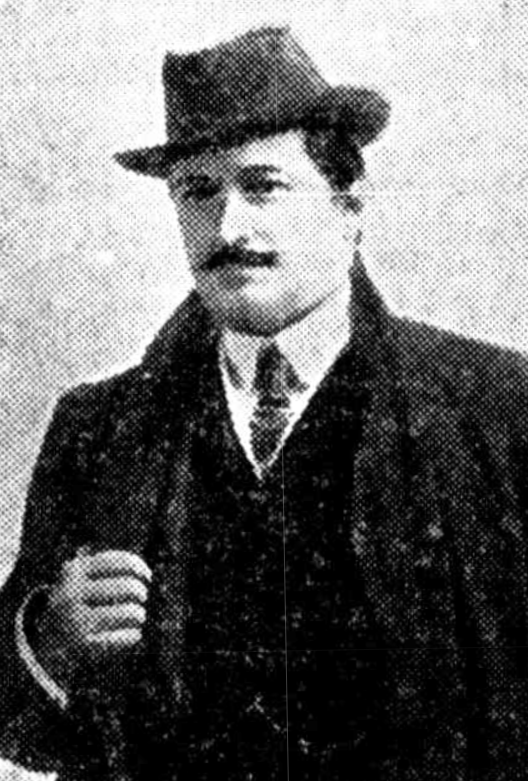
De Beaupuis in later years

Emanuel de Beaupuis (11 November 1860 – 26 March 1913) was an Italian pianist who had a distinguished career in Australia, where he died. He was knighted by the King of Italy in 1912 and consequently has been referred to as Cavaliere de Beaupuis. His first name is often given as "Emanuele", notably in the Catholic newspapers, also "Emmanuele".

== History ==
Beaupuis was born into a musical family in Naples, and studied at the Conservatorium from age 12 to 18, his main teacher being Beniamino Cesi, one of Thalberg's pupils. He toured Europe and settled in Egypt for four years before sailing for Australia at the instigation of Charles Santley, arriving in Melbourne in 1889.

His first Australian performance was on 30 May 1889, in a concert at the Athenaeum, raising funds for the Italian Mutual Benefit Association. A private recital for the Governor, Sir William Robinson at Government House followed, then an invitation-only recital at the Athenaeum on 7 June, then contributed to the Metropolitan Liedertafel concert at the same venue on 10 June. His first public performances were at the Melbourne Town Hall on 25, 27 and 29 June. The Age critic found his playing brilliant and faultless but without feeling, at a tempo seldom attempted. Pieces by Henri Ketten suffered by comparison with the composer's rendition. His own compositions they found slight, and without interest. The Argus critic noted, disapprovingly, his break-neck playing of Weber's Polacca.

He lived and worked in Adelaide from October 1893, with a series of well-received concerts together with violinist Bessie Doyle and contralto Ada Crossley to November 1895

He toured Australia and South Africa, before settling in Sydney in 1896. He increasingly spent less time on the concert stage, devoting his energy to teaching. After Johann Kruse's tour in 1895 and Amy Castles' debut in 1899 he never appeared in public again, apart from a suite of concerts with Jan Kubelik in 1908.

He suffered ill-health the last year of his life, during which time he was knighted by the King of Italy. He died in a private hospital of a heart ailment. His remains were interred in the Catholic portion of Waverley Cemetery. Chief mourners were Madame de Beaupuis (his widow), Mrs. Osborne (her daughter), and Robert Kerr, his brother-in-law.

== Influence ==
Notable Australian pupils include Roy Ewing Agnew, B. Schubach, Hilda Aiken Bessie Robertson, who received further instruction in Europe from Bruno Gortatowski and Teresa Carreño, a costly exercise. He taught Roy Mackey, Roy Basil Mackay, Mrs Walter Treleaven, Marjorie Percival, Maggie Chisholm, and Louisa King-Hall (daughter of George King-Hall)

Teachers of pianoforte who advertised having studied under de Beaupuis include C. A. Vaughn of Queanbeyan and Ethel Wyndham of Cowra, later Grafton. Miss R. Craig of Penrith, Zita Watkins, Patience Hardwicke, He encouraged Mrs Charles Huenerbein to conduct classes in piano accompaniment, emphasizing the skills of sight reading, transposition, and modulation.

His compositions include "Waltz de Concert", "Sur la mer" "Ave Maria" "Irish Airs" "Merry Peasant", "Canadian Boat Song", "Valse Caprice",

== Family ==
Beaupuis was married to Adele Elizabeth Beaupuis (died 31 March 1902). On 24 December 1903 he married Bertha Lord, née Kerr, widow of Charles Septimus Lord (died 1900), son of Francis Lord MLC. She was a fine pianist, in later life piano and singing teacher of Kambala School, Rose Bay; Mrs de Beaupuis was "the heart of the music circle in Sydney" She sponsored the Mme de Beaupuis' music prize.

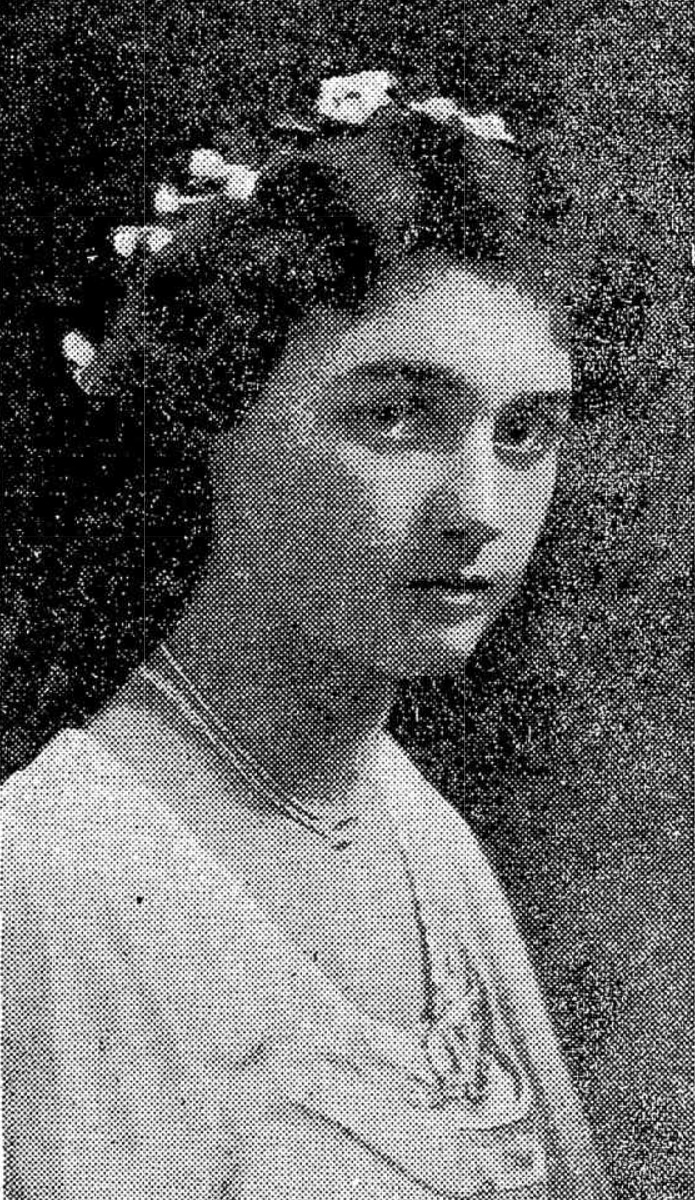
Marjorie Osborne, née Lord

Her daughter Marjorie Lord was introduced into Sydney high society by her cousin, Mrs Geoffrey Evan Fairfax, née Lena Hixson. She married grazier Henry Hill Osborne of (inter alia) Clifford Station, Queensland on 30 April 1912, and as Marjorie Ainsworth Osborne was star of The Blue Mountains Mystery. They had one child, Rupert, born February 1913. She divorced him in 1927 and was reported in 1940 as living in England. Her mother was still living in Sydney in 1938, but nothing later has been found.
