= Edith Best =

Musical artist (1865-1950)

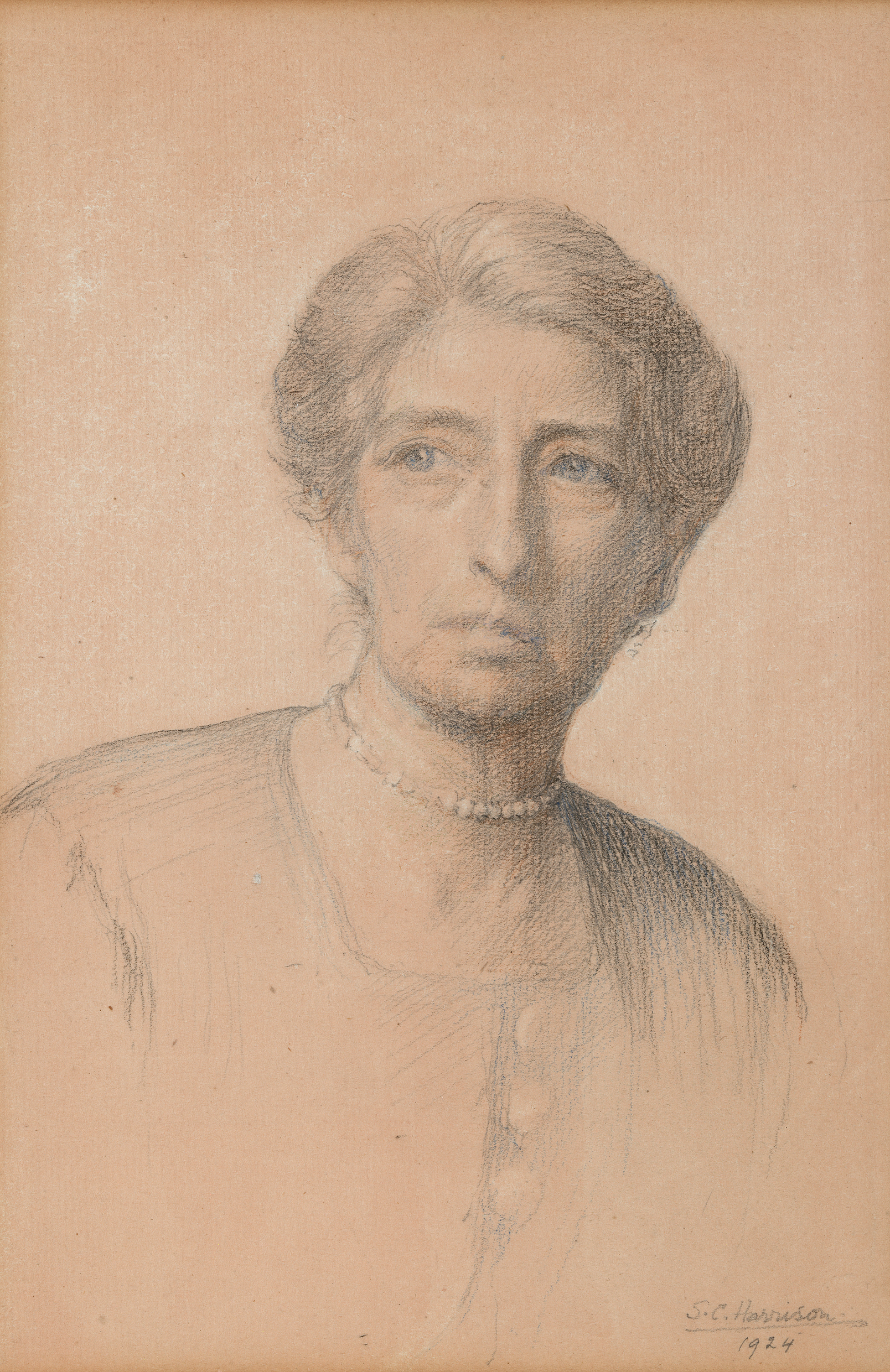

Background information
- Born: Edith Oldham; 11 July 1865; Dublin, Ireland
- Died: 9 March 1950 (aged 84)
- Occupation: Musician
- Instrument: piano

Edith Best (11 July 1865 – 9 March 1950) was an Irish musician and one of the founding members of the Feis Ceoil.

== Early life and family ==
Edith Best was born in Dublin on 11 July 1865. She was the youngest of 14 children of Dublin merchant, Eldred Oldham, and Annie (née Alker). Two of her siblings were Alice Oldham, the first of nine women to graduate from university with a degree in either Great Britain or Ireland, and Charles Hubert Oldham, first professor of national economics at University College Dublin. She attended the Royal Irish Academy of Music (RIAM), studying under Margaret O'Hea and Robert Prescott Stewart. She won the Lord O'Hagan's prize in 1883. Best was one of the first three candidates to win a scholarship to the Royal College of Music, London, in 1883, becoming an associate of the College by competitive examination in 1887. She was a close friend and confidante of the College's director, Sir George Grove, to which his 514 letters to her from 1883 to 1899, now housed in the RCM library, testify.

In 1906, she married Richard Irvine Best. At the time of their marriage, she was 41, and he was 34. He stated that "neither he nor his wife had any illusions about each other." She died at her home in Dublin aged 84. She is buried in Deans Grange Cemetery.

== Career ==
She returned to the RIAM as a piano teacher in 1887, remaining in that post until 1932. She was the first female teacher in the RIAM listed as holding a diploma in music. She was also an assistant to Michele Esposito as a local centre examiner. Best was a founding member of the Feis Ceoil, undertaking large responsibility for its organisation, and it became an annual event under her leadership. In 1898, she described the foundation of the Feis in a paper to the Incorporated Society of Musicians as being inspired to "ultimately do more for the art of music in Ireland than anything which has yet been attempted." Along with Joseph Seymour and Edward Fournier she visited the Welsh Eisteddfod to compare it with the Feis, and hoped it would become as influential as the Welsh festival. She worked with Eoin MacNeill and the Gaelic League to promote the Feis, and to organise prizes. Under her influence, the festival broadened its scope beyond purely Irish music. She served as the honorary secretary of the Feis Ceoil Association from 1896 to 1905, and vice-president from 1905 to 1950. In 1897, Esposito dedicated his cantata Deirdre to her. Best was a founding member of the Dublin Orchestral Society in 1899, and she succeeded Esposito as the director of music at Alexandra College, Dublin, in 1927. She was made an associate of the Royal Dublin Society in 1892, and fellow of the RIAM in 1938.
