= Mia Cranwill =

Irish designer and metal artist

- Born: Maria Cranwill; 1 March 1880; Drumcondra, Dublin
- Died: 20 October 1972 (aged 92)
- Education: Manchester School of Art
- Notable work: Senate Casket

Mia Cranwill (born Maria Cranwill; 1 March 1880 – 20 October 1972) was an Irish designer and metal artist, and was one of the leading artists of the Irish Celtic Revival.

== Early life and education ==
Mia Cranwill at 3 Charlotte Place, Drumcondra, Dublin on 1 March 1880. She was the daughter of two first cousins, Arthur Henry Cranwill, an analytical chemist, son of Thomas Smith Cranwill Jnr and Maria Hogan and "Amy" Amelia Frances Holland, daughter of William Thomas Holland and Emily Amelia Cranwill. Arthur Henry Cranwill was an ardent Parnellite, and acted as a treasurer of the Irish Protestant Home Rule Association. Throughout her childhood Cranwill suffered poor health which affected her education, which was a mix of home education and private schooling. The family moved to Manchester when she was aged fifteen. Whilst there, Cranwill attended night classes in art, going on to receive a scholarship to the Manchester School of Art. She qualified as a teacher and taught for eight years until ill-health and dissatisfaction with her job led to her resignation in 1915. After this, Cranwill ran a fruit and poultry farm in Emsworth with a friend. They were forced to abandon the farm after 18 months, when her friend fell ill. Cranwill remained interested in Ireland during her time in England, with her father's friend Charles Hubert Oldham encouraged her to study Irish history and mythology whenever she visited Dublin. Through this study, Cranwill became familiar with the work of George Coffey on early Irish art, which led to her beginning to experiment with Celtic design in metal and enamel assisted by Frederick Newland Smith from the Manchester School of Art. She decided to return to Ireland permanently, moving to Dublin in May 1917.

== Early artistic career ==
Upon her return to Dublin, Cranwill set up her studio on Suffolk Street, which was known as "a joyous haven". She would produce special order pieces of individual orders, primarily in gold and silver with semi-precious stones and minerals. These included Irish Achill amethyst, and other native materials when possible. These pieces drew on Celtic design as inspiration, incorporating symbols from Irish mythology or contemporary poetry. Cranwill was a member of George William Russell's theosophy circle, receiving a commission to design a ring for the Gaelic League member Charlotte Dease inspired by her horoscope. Her main source of income were regular orders from Mundie's, a Manchester firm, however these ended after the Irish War of Independence, during which she hid republican guns in her workroom. After this she considered closing the studio, but a commission from Count John McCormack to create a pectoral cross for the Archbishop Carbery of Baltimore, USA, changed her mind. In 1921 she became a member of the Guild of Irish Artworkers. She exhibited with the Royal Dublin Society, the Arts and Crafts Society of Ireland in 1917 and 1921, and the Royal Miniature Society in 1920. At the Galerie Barbazanges in Paris her work was featured in an exhibition of Irish applied art in January 1922, and later at the Manchester City Art Gallery exhibition of jewellery by local craftworks in July 1923. In the 1920s, she was commissioned to produce numerous items, including a monstrance, tabernacle, sanctuary lamp, and frames for altar cards for St Patrick's catholic church, San Francisco, USA. The monstrance was produced in collaboration with Newland Smith, and was exhibited in the National Museum of Ireland (NMI) in July 1927, before being shipped to San Francisco.

One of her most significant pieces was commissioned by Alice Stopford Green, it was to create a metal casket for a scroll with the signatures of the Free State senators. The casket, known as the Senate Casket, has gold, silver, and enamel on a copper foundation. The shape is based on that of the Gallarus Oratory. Upon its completion in 1924, it received universal praise, being exhibited at the NMI and the Manchester Art Federation. When the Senate was dissolved in 1936, it was presented to the Royal Irish Academy. Newland Smith reviewed the casket, described Cranwill was a "designer and craftswoman who understands the national Irish style and can interpret it, create anew within it, and add to the old and delightful forms a personality and expression quite new".

Cranwill's other works include an episcopal ring for John Dignan (1924), a tabernacle door for St. Michael's Church, Ballinasloe (1926), and a hymnal board for Holy Trinity church, Killiney (1932). In collaboration with Neville Wilkinson, she produced a miniature reproduction of the Cross of Cong and the Ardagh Chalice for Titania's Palace. In 1933, she designed a presentation cup for the Catholic Boy Scouts of Ireland, illustrated with scenes from Irish history. She created rings for people such as Micheál Mac Liammóir, Compton Mackenzie, and Charlotte Payne-Townshend. George Bernard Shaw described her as "the Irish Benvenuto Cellini", and wrote of her issues with vested interests in the Irish gold and silver trade over the lack of hallmarks on her work. Cranwill designed the standards for the Irish Free State Army, which were produced by Cuala Industries, and were first borne on St Patrick's day 1937. Due to failing health in her later life, Cranwill gave up metalwork, instead weaving and illustrating. She illustrated the Dolmen Press's Ewart Milne's poem Galion (1953) and Thomas Kinsella's translation of The sons of Usnech (1954).

== Later life ==
Cranwill made her own clothes and cobbled her own shoes into her seventies. She left her Killiney home and workshop, living the last ten years of her life in the Alexandra Guild House, Leinster Road West, Dublin. She died there on 20 October 1972. Eva Douglas painted a portrait of her. She is said to have believed she was a reincarnation of a Mayan princess.
