= Nick Toczek =

British writer

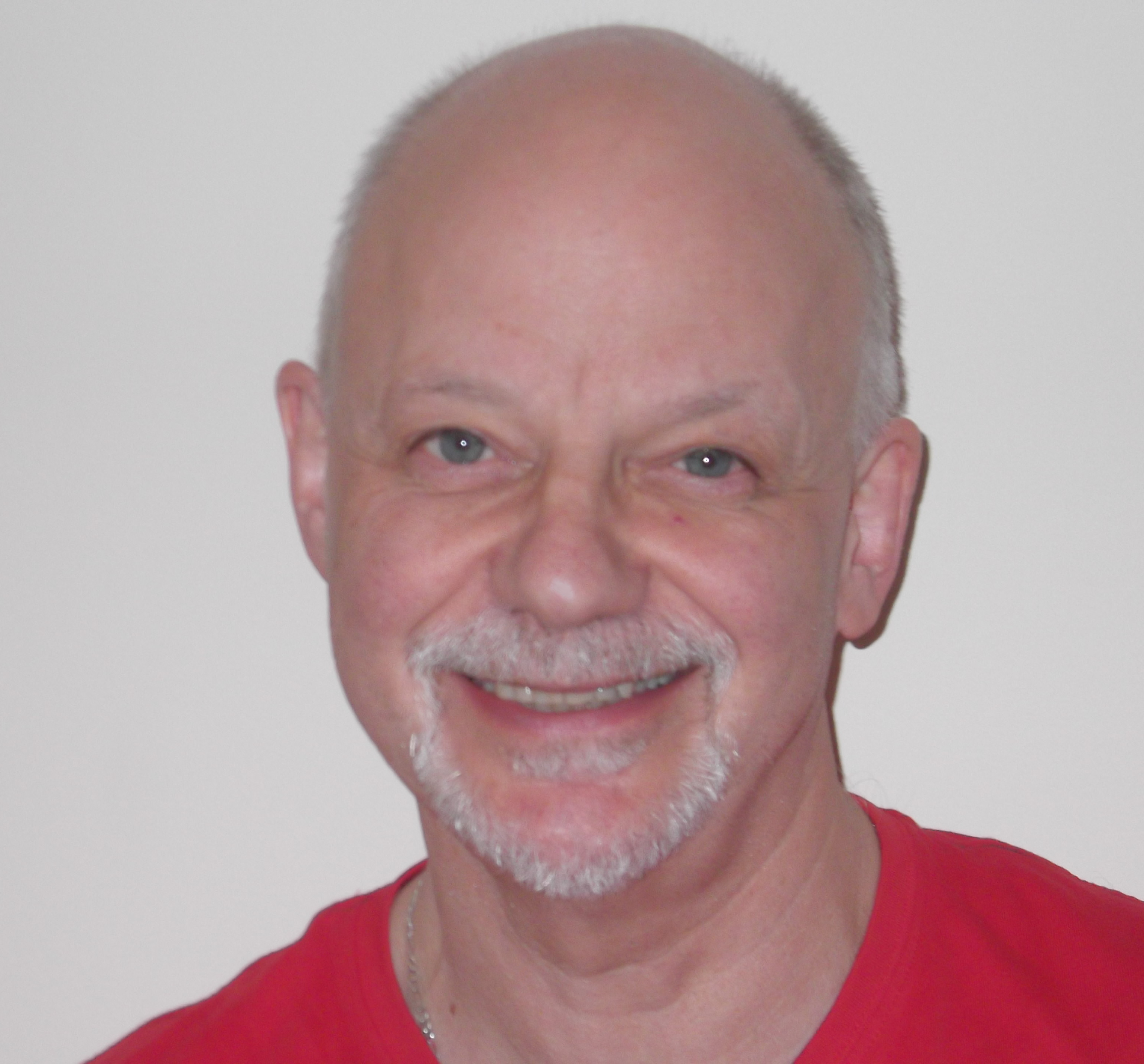
- Born: Nicholas Toczek; 20 September 1950 (age 75); Shipley, England
- Occupation: Writer
- Writing career
- Genres: Poetry, Music, Journalism, Disc Jockey

Nick Toczek (born 20 September 1950; Shipley, England) is a British writer and performer working variously as a poet, journalist, magician, vocalist, lyricist and radio broadcaster. He was raised in Bradford and then took a degree in Industrial Metallurgy at Birmingham University (1968–71) where he began reading and publishing his poetry. Staying on in Moseley, Birmingham, until 1977, he founded his poetry magazine The Little Word Machine, had several books and pamphlets published by small presses, co-founded Moseley Community Arts Festival, and toured with his music and poetry troupe, The Stereo Graffiti Show. Moving back to Bradford in 1977, he co-founded the seminal music fanzine The Wool City Rocker and formed the band Ulterior Motives, in which he was lyricist and lead vocalist. Continuing to tour as a poet and to publish his writings, he also recorded songs with a variety of bands. During the early 1980s, he ran a series of weekly punk and indie gigs. Throughout the late '80s and early '90s, he ran weekly alternative cabaret clubs, usually co-organising these with fellow performer Wild Willi Beckett. Since the mid-'90s, his collections of children's poetry (first with Macmillan and later with Hodder, LDA, Caboodle, etc.) have seen him become a best-selling children's writer. Also, since 1997, he has been regularly collaborating with the composer Malcolm Singer, starting with their cantataDragons. By 2011, Toczek had worked as a visiting writer in thousands of schools, visiting dozens of countries worldwide in the course of this work. He is also a professional close-up magician, a skilled puppeteer, an authority on far-right neo-Nazi and racist groups, a prolific print journalist and an experienced broadcaster.

== Life and work ==
Nick Toczek was brought up in Bradford, where he was educated at Frizinghall Road School (briefly), Victoria Park Preparatory School and Bradford Grammar School. He then took a BSc in Industrial Metallurgy at the University of Birmingham, graduating with 3rd class Hons in 1971.

While at university, he began to read his poetry in public and was co-founder and co-editor of the campus poetry magazine, Black Columbus (nine editions, one per term, 1969–72).

He lived in Moseley in Birmingham until the summer of 1977. Based in a flat on Queenswood Road, he launched his own poetry magazine, The Little Word Machine, in 1972. Eleven editions appeared before it folded in 1979. In 1977, as a spin-off from the magazine, he published and co-edited (with Philip Nanton and Yann Lovelock) Britain's first substantial anthology of black writing, Melanthika: An Anthology of Pan-Caribbean Writing, under the imprint LWM Publications.

In 1974, Toczek co-founded the annual Moseley Community Arts Festival and was its director for several years. In 1975, he was a founder-member (and manager) of the poetry and music group, Stereo Graffiti, which debuted at the Ilkley Literature Festival in May of that year. Thereafter, the group toured throughout the UK before disbanding in 1977.

Toczek writes every day. He says: "If I was an athlete, I’d need to train on a daily basis. As a writer, I therefore make myself write every day. It's a routine I’ve followed since I was a teenager."

In the late 1960s, his poetry began to appear regularly in journals. Some of his short punning poems appeared in The Sunday Times and again in two collections they published entitled Worse Verse (1971) and More Worse Verse (1972).

After a poetry reading in a Birmingham pub, he was invited by J. C. R. Green, director of the Birmingham-based Aquila Publishing Company to submit a short manuscript. In 1972, this first collection duly appeared as a pamphlet entitled Because the Evenings. It was the start of a decade-long working relationship that saw Aquila publish four more collections of his poetry and an early novella, Autobiography of a Friend. Over this period, various other small presses also published single collections.

During the last half of 1976 and the first few months of 1977, Toczek was drawn into punk after seeing Birmingham gigs featuring The Clash, Ramones, The Adverts, The Slits, The Vibrators, Blondie, The Prefects, Talking Heads and others. After he and his then-partner and fellow Stereo Graffiti member, Kay Russell, moved to Bradford in the summer of 1977, they formed the band Ulterior Motives, releasing a single – "Y'Gotta Shout" c/w "Another Lover" – on their own label, Motive Music, in 1979. That December, the pair co-edited and published the first edition of the seminal indie rock mag, The Wool City Rocker. Toczek and Russell split up in mid-December and, at a Christmas Day party, he met his future wife, Gaynor.

Under Toczek's editorship, The Wool City Rocker appeared monthly throughout 1980 during which time it changed from being Bradford-focussed to covering the whole of the north of England, later editions each including a free flexi-disc of northern bands. A final edition, No. 14, appeared in the summer of 1981.

Toczek continued to tour and record with Ulterior Motives until the band split up in 1982. Since then, he has toured as a solo artist.

For four years, from March 1982 until April 1986, Toczek ran weekly punk (and later indie) gigs at assorted venues throughout the Leeds-Bradford area, sometimes as many as five a week, each with suitably lurid names (including Gory Details, Fatal Shocks and Natural Disasters). In September 1986, Toczek formed a business partnership with Willi Beckett (performance poet, frontman of The Psycho Surgeons and leading light of the Monster Raving Loony Party) to run a weekly alternative cabaret club under the name of his long-defunct show, Stereo Graffiti. The alternative cabaret scene soon took off and this project blossomed, continuing under different names and in a variety of West Yorkshire venues until the mid-nineties. It spawned various side projects including Bradford Writers' Group (which the pair founded in 1987) and a Festival of European Community Literature (which they ran in April 1989).

On 8 September 1984, Toczek and Gaynor (née Doherty) were married. Their daughter, Rebecca, was born on 23 December 1986 and their son, Matthew, on 20 August 1990.

In the autumn of 1993, Toczek began a two-year stint as W. H. Smith resident storyteller at Eureka! the children's museum in Halifax, West Yorkshire. In 1995 and again in 1996, he was an MP in the Channel 4 TV debating programme The People's Parliament.

Since 1997, Toczek has collaborated with the composer Malcolm Singer. Their first joint work, a cantata using Toczek's dragon poems, was performed at London's Royal Albert Hall in 1998. Toczek later worked on a storyline and then a play-script in order to turn the cantata into a musical which was published as Dragons! The Musical by Golden Apple in 2005. While he was working on this, Toczek was asked to write a pantomime for Golden Apple. This was Sleeping Beauty's Dream which they published in 2003. In 2004, Perfect Pitch, another Toczek-Singer cantata, this time based on Toczek's football poems, was performed at The Barbican in London. A further collaboration, this time a political opera entitled The Jailer's Tale, was premiered at The Arts Depot, also in London, in February 2010.

Toczek has produced weekly shows for Bradford Community Broadcasting since it was founded in the mid-1980s His current show, InTOCZEKated, has been running since 1991.

The 1997 poetry anthology The Spirit of Bradford, which Toczek co-edited with David Tipton, won a Raymond Williams Community Publishing Award. A short programme on writing poetry which he made in 2000 for the Channel 4 Education series, Just Write, was BAFTA-nominated. In 2002/3, his poem "Responsibilities" featured in an award-winning TV advert. In 2004/5, he was employed as a consultant and contributor on BBC TV's new digital curriculum for schools.

Since 2004, he has also worked regularly as a professional magician. He says: "It's another of those things that I started as a hobby and it just escalated."

Toczek has been writing lyrics and recording his songs with a wide variety of musicians since the mid-1970s, releasing album and EPs, and contributing to compilation albums. He co-wrote the lyrics (with Pete Doherty) of the popular Babyshambles song "Baddie's Boogie".

His first full-length political book, "Haiters, Baiters and Would-Be Dictators: Anti-Semitism and the UK Far-Right", was published by Routledge at the end of 2015. He is currently working on the follow-up, "Farage Faces Foreigners", covering the history of British Euro-scepticism, Islamophobia and wider xenophobia.

Toczek has released two albums with German musician Thies Marsen. Their collaboration began in 2012 when Marsen used the vocals from a Toczek spoken word track on his own composition. Toczek gave permission for Marsen to use more of his vocals to be used this way and this led to the release of The Bavariations EP in 2012. More tracks were added to make a full album, The Bavariations Album, released on CD in 2019. A follow-up album, Death & Other Destinations: the Second Bavariations Album, was recorded by Marsen using Toczek's pre-recorded vocals and released as a vinyl LP in 2021.

In 2019, Toczek began collaborating with Matt Webster, former drummer with many bands on the Bradford punk and indie scene of the 80s and 90s, including Western Dance, Primate, Grim and Zed. Webster had begun recording and releasing material under the name Signia Alpha in 2018. In 2019, the pair started recording the album Shooting the Messenger, released on CD and vinyl in 2020. Although Webster plays drums, guitar, bass on keyboards on the album, a number of guest musicians augmented the line-up of Signia Alpha. These included jazz saxophonist Keith Jafrate, flautist Chris Walsh, bassist Mark Cranmer and guitarists Jack Atkinson, Stephen Andrews and Emmanuel Williams. Bassist Jonny Botterell and rapper Dee Bo General appeared on one track apiece. All are veterans of the Bradford music scene. The album was a mix of indie, jazz and funk grooves with Nick Toczek’s surreal poems and stories over the top.

A second album by Nick Toczek and Signia Alpha followed in 2021. Walking the Tightrope featured many of the same musicians alongside Webster and Toczek with the addition of guitarists Wulf Ingham and Simon Nolan (formally vocalist with anarcho punks Anti System). The album again had jazz and funk elements but was rockier in feel and included a guest appearance by The Damned’s Paul Gray, who played bass on the track “Best Wishes”.

Toczek and Webster recorded their third album in 2021. Due to the restrictions imposed by the Covid-19 epidemic, most of the other musicians recorded their parts remotely. The Columbus Memoirs was released on vinyl and CD in 2022. Again, Matt Webster played many of the instruments with contributions from most of the musicians featured on the first two albums, including Paul Gray, who played bass on four of the ten tracks. A new addition to the line-up was Bradford singer-songwriter Harris, who added guitar and vocals to several tracks. The album is a mix of genres. The tracks that feature Paul Gray on bass are generally post-punk influenced, while the seven-minute title track is a Frank Zappa influenced improvised jazz piece based around Toczek’s surreal retelling of the history of the USA.

The first single from the album, ''Dignity'', is a blues-rock track highlighting the plight of refugees and displaced people. Toczek’s own father and uncle were refugees who came to England during World War II, a story told in the short film Tvins.

== Books ==
=== Poetry for adults ===
- Toczek, Nick (1972). Because the Evenings. Aquila Publishing Company. ISBN 0-903226-07-3. – early poems.
- Toczek, Nick (1973). The Book of Numbers. Aquila Publishing Company. ISBN 0-903226-56-1. (paperback). – poems and short prose pieces.
- Toczek, Nick (1974). Evensong. Sceptre Press. – single poem.
- Toczek, Nick (1975). Malignant Humour. Aquila Publishing Company. ISBN 0-903226-41-3. – short humorous punning poems.
- Toczek, Nick (1975). God Shave the Queen. Aquila Publishing Company. ISBN 0-7275-0140-2. – short humorous punning poems.
- Toczek, Nick (1979). The Credible Adventures of Nick Toczek. Kawabata Press. ISBN 0-906110-16-5. – short fictionalised prose pieces.
- Toczek, Nick (1979). Complete Strangers Tell You Nothing. Xenia Press. ISBN 0-905761-01-4. – single poem, illustrated.
- Toczek, Nick (1979). Acts of Violence. Waygoose Press. ISBN 0-950663-50-6. – short fiction / bizarre tales.
- Toczek, Nick (1979). Lies. Rivelin Press. ISBN 0-904524-18-3. – poems.
- Toczek, Nick (1981). Rock'n'Roll Terrorism. Aquila Publishing Company. ISBN 0-7275-0205-0. – performance poems, lyrics and short prose pieces.
- Toczek, Nick (1987). Fish Fox Peaches & Pig. Purple Heather Press. ISBN 0-950834-15-7. – experimental poems and prose.
- Toczek, Nick (1989). The Private Crimes of Nick Toczek. Amazing Colossal Press. – short pieces of quirky fiction.
- Toczek, Nick (1991). The Meat Boutique. PB Publications. ISBN 0-951756-30-3. – political lyrics and performance poetry.
- Toczek, Nick (1995). Slaphead Wrote Some Poems. Hybrid Press. ISBN 1-873412-60-6. – poems for adults and teenagers.
- Toczek, Nick (1998). The Wreckage. Redbeck Press. ISBN 0-946980-53-5. – poems.
- Toczek, Nick (2020). Voices in My Head. Caboodle Books. ISBN 978-1-9997749-5-0. – poems.
- Toczek, Nick (2020). Corona Diary. Mutiny 2000 Publications. ISBN 9-780992-675530. – first of 3 collections about the pandemic.
- Toczek, Nick; Webster, Matt (2022). The Columbus Memoirs and Other Tales. Mutiny 2000 Publications. ISBN 978-0-9926755-5-4. – The collected lyrics of Nick Toczek and Signia Alpha.
- Toczek, Nick (2022). The Year The World Stood Still. Mutiny 2000 Publications. ISBN 978-0-9926755-4-7. – The second of 3 collections about the pandemic.

=== Children's poetry ===
- Toczek, Nick (1995). Dragons. Macmillan Children's Books. ISBN 0-330-34829-9. – dragon poems.
- Toczek, Nick (1997). Dragons Everywhere. Macmillan Children's Books. ISBN 0-330-36792-7. – more dragon poems.
- Toczek, Nick (2000). Never Stare at a Grizzly Bear. Macmillan Children's Books. ISBN 978-0-330-39121-4. – animal poems.
- Toczek, Nick (2000). The Dragon Who Ate Our School. Macmillan Children's Books. ISBN 0-330-34829-9. – dragon poems (originally published as Dragons)
- Toczek, Nick (2000). Can Anyone Be As Gloomy As Me?. Hodder Wayland. ISBN 0-7502-2793-1. (re-published 2005) – poems for young readers, about feeling sad. (Poemotions)
- Toczek, Nick; Rosen, Michael; Kay, Jackie; Agard, John; Nichols, Grace (2002). Number Parade. LDA. ISBN 1-85503-343-7. – poems about numbers 0–100 (21 by Nick, 20 each by Michael Rosen, Jackie Kay, John Agard and Grace Nichols).
- Toczek, Nick (2002). Kick It!. Macmillan Children's Books. ISBN 0-330-39920-9. – football poems.
- Toczek, Nick (2003). Sleeping Beauty's Dream. Golden Apple. – pantomime: 2 books (script + songbook) + CD.
- Toczek, Nick (2005). Dragons!. Macmillan Children's Books. ISBN 0-330-43744-5. – collected dragon poems (past 2 books + new collection).
- Toczek, Nick; Singer, Malcolm (2005). Dragons! The Musical. Golden Apple. ISBN 978-1-84449-480-4. – musical: 2 books (script + songbook) + CD. Nick Toczek and Malcolm Singer.
- Toczek, Nick; Singer, Malcolm (2005). Dragons! The Musical: Teachers Book. Omnibus Press Wise Publications. ISBN 9781844494811.
- Toczek, Nick (2008). Me and My Poems. Caboodle Books. ISBN 978-0-955971-10-5. – assorted poems for children (and adults).
- Toczek, Nick (2009). Hogs'n'Dogs'n'Slugs'n'Bugs. Caboodle Books. ISBN 978-0-955971-11-2. – creature poems.
- Toczek, Nick (2009). Cats'n'Bats'n'Slugs'n'Bugs. Caboodle Books. ISBN 978-0-956265-65-4. – (above book re-titled) collected creature poems.
- Toczek, Nick (2009). Number, Number, Cut A Cucumber. Caboodle Books. ISBN 978-0-956265-64-7. – poems for younger children.
- Toczek, Nick (2016). Dragons Are Back. Caboodle Books. ISBN 978-0-956265-64-7. – selected dragon poems.

=== Fiction ===
- Toczek, Nick (1975). Autobiography of a Friend. Aquila Publishing Company. ISBN 0-903226-66-9. – novella.
- Toczek, Nick (2004). Group of Heroes. Skrev Press. ISBN 9781904646105. – novella.

=== Non-fiction ===
- Toczek, Nick; Lambert, Tim; Partridge, Leslie (1988). Rockbiz. The Open College. ISBN 0-7482-0500-4. – popular music syllabus.
- Toczek, Nick (1991). The Bigger Tory Vote – The Covert Sequestration of the Bigotry Vote. AK Press. ISBN 1-873176-20-1. – investigative research into far-right of UK Conservative Party.
- Toczek, Nick; Krysinski, Alex (1995). The Life of Bierley. Yorkshire Arts Circus. ISBN 1-898311-17-X. – portrait of a Bradford 'problem' estate (with Alex Krysinski).
- Toczek, Nick (2016). Haters, Baiters and Would-Be Dictators - Anti-Semitism and the UK Far-Right. Routledge. ISBN 978-1-138-85350-8.

=== Anthologies for adults ===
- Toczek, Nick; Heathcock, Maralyn; Humphries, Paul (1972). Midland Read: An Omnibus of Local Poetry. Aquila Publishing Company. OCLC 122688431. – An Omnibus of Poetry (with Maralyn Heathcock and Paul Humphries).
- Toczek, Nick; Lovelock, Yann; Nanton, Phil (1977). Toczek, Nick; Lovelock, Yann; Nanton, Phil (eds.). Melanthika. L.W.M Publications. ISBN 0-905393-00-7. – the Uk's first collection of pan-Caribbean writing (with Yann Lovelock & Philip Nanton).
- Toczek, Nick; Tipton, David (1997). Toczek, Nick; Tipton, David (eds.). The Spirit of Bradford. Redbeck Press. ISBN 0-946980-39-X. – poems about living in Bradford (with David Tipton).

=== Anthologies for children ===
- Toczek, Nick (2000). Join In, Or Else.....!. Macmillan Children's Books. ISBN 0-330-48263-7. – participatory poems.
- Toczek, Nick (2002). Toothpaste Trouble. Macmillan Children's Books. ISBN 0-330-39753-2. – poems for younger readers: Poems from Breakfast to Bedtime.
- Toczek, Nick; Peters, Andrew Fusek (2004). The Dog Ate My Bus Pass. Macmillan Children's Books. ISBN 0-330-41800-9. – poems that are excuses (with Andrew Fusek Peters).
- Toczek, Nick; Cookson, Paul; Cookson, Paul (2007). Read Me Out Loud!. Macmillan Children's Books. ISBN 978-0-330-44621-1. – poems for performing – A Poem To Rap, Chant, Whisper Or Shout For Every Day of the Year (with Paul Cookson).

== Discography ==
=== Rock music and performance poetry ===
- ''Y'Gotta Shout/Another Lover'' (Motive Music – MMR001, 1979) – 7" single of 2 songs by Ulterior Motives.
- The Britanarchist Demo Tape (Bluurg Tapes – No. 29, 1983) – Cassette of performance poems + 3 songs by Toczek with To Be Continued.
- Ulterior Motives Demo Tape (Bluurg Tapes – No. 49, 1985) – Cassette of performance poems and short stories.
- More to Hate... ...Than Meets The Eye (Martyrhate Records – ACR 001, 1986) – 12" EP of 4 songs by Toczek, 2 with The Burial, 2 with Spectre.
- Bloodsucker (Other Records – OTH 5, 1986) – Compilation 7" single with 1 performance poem.
- The Intolerance Tape (Bluurg Tapes – No. 69, 1986) – Compilation cassette of 11 performance poems.
- InTOCZEKated (Bluurg Records – FISH 19, 1987) – 12" LP of 11 songs by Toczek with various bands.
- God Save Us From The U.S.A. (Happy Mike Records – KTLP001, 1987) Compilation LP includes 2 performance poems.
- The CIA Tape: Live Toronto 87 (Bluurg Tapes – #76, 1987) – Live compilation cassette of performance poems.
- The Meat Boutique (Acrimony Tapes, 1988) – Cassette of performance poems.
- Selfish Men (Not-a-Rioty, 2004) – CD (with booklet) of performance poems.
- Totally InTOCZEKated (Mutiny 2000 Records, 2007) – 25-track CD (with lyric booklet) of songs by Toczek with various bands.
- Britanarchy (Not-a-Rioty, 2011) – 5 track CD EP (with lyric booklet) of songs by Toczek with Threshold Shift.
- Motormouth (Sound Shack, 2012) - 46 track 3-CD albums of spoken-word poetry.
- Motormouth (Not-a-Rioty, 2018) - 46 track 2-CD albums re-release of above.
- Dealing with the Darkness (Mutiny 2000 Records, 2018) - 49 track 2-CD albums of spoken-word poetry.

=== Nick Toczek & Thies Marsen ===
- Bavariations (Sound Shack, 2012) - 3 track CD EP
- "Sea Shanty" (2019)
- The Bavariations Album (Not-a-Rioty, 2019) - 12 track CD album.
- "Cars in Cairo" (2021)
- Death & Other Variations: The Second Bavariations Album (Not-a-Rioty, 2020) - 12 track vinyl LP.

=== Nick Toczek & Signia Alpha ===
- ''The Voices in His Head'' (2019)
- Shooting the Messenger (Mutiny 2000 Records, 2020) - 17 track CD album, 10 track vinyl LP.
- "Coming to Get You Next" (2020)
- "When We Men Talk" featuring Dee Bo General (2020)
- "No Messages" (2020)
- "This City Eats" (2020)
- "The Movie" (2020)
- Walking the Tightrope (Mutiny 2000 Records, 2021) - 11 track vinyl LP.
- "Cannibals of the Western World" (2021)
- Un-Herd Volume 88 (2021) compilation CD featuring the track ''Cannibals of the Western World''
- "Best Wishes" (2021)
- "Dignity" (2022)
- The Columbus Memoirs (Mutiny 2000 Records, 2022) - 10 track vinyl LP.

=== Classical music ===
- Let Music Live (Surrey Youth Music & Performing Arts, 1999) – CD: Dragons Cantata (live at Royal Albert Hall).
- Dragons & Gladiators (Bexley Centre for Music & Dance, 1999) – CD: Dragons Cantata (live at Royal Festival Hall).

== Journalism ==
During the 1980s, Toczek wrote for the short-lived music weekly, Musicians Only, an offshoot of Melody Maker, for which Nick wrote regular articles and reviews starting in the 28 June 1980 issue, finishing with the final issue, before becoming a features writer on the seminal Edinburgh-based pop culture monthly, Cut. for which Nick wrote features and reviews for more than two years... his first piece (a feature) was in the June 1987 issue, his final piece (a review) was in the July 1989 issue. Throughout the 1980s he also wrote on literature and the arts for the monthly journal of the Yorkshire Arts Association. The Month in Yorkshire featured Nick's music column, Another Stick of Yorkshire Rock, starting in the October 1980 issue, and continuing until the final Summer 1981 issue. From October 1981 it was replaced by The Month in Yorkshire, which continued to carry Nick's music column, from its first issue, until the April 1982 issue, after which it became The Outer Limits of The Arts (from May 1982 issue), until May 1983. Thereafter, Nick wrote occasional features for the journal until its demise in 1986. Also, from the March 1984 issue, he wrote a new column, Toczek's Rockcheck, which ran for several months, and had his own column in the weekly Bradford Star for more than two years... his first column was in issue 7, 19 March 1981, his final column was in issue 113, 1983. He also wrote many features for the paper including a series of pieces on his experience of adventure sports.

Since the early 1980s, he has been collecting an archive of far-right and racist literature, especially from Britain and America. His 1991 book, The Bigger Tory Vote details racist activity in the UK. In the immediate aftermath of the April 1995 Oklahoma City bombing, he wrote lengthy features for The Guardian, The Independent, Pagina (Argentina), The South China News (Hong Kong) and Rheinisher Merkur (Germany). He has since been employed as a researcher by most UK newspapers and has appeared in this capacity on numerous UK TV and radio programmes.

In 2006, he returned to rock journalism as a features writer for the Bradford-based northern fanzine, Mono. The journal, which folded 2 years later, listed him as its Guru. Since 2008 he has been a columnist, reviewer and features writer with the bi-monthly music journal, R'n’R (formerly R2 and before that called Rock'n’Reel). Having written his first piece, a feature on bluesman Stephen Dale Petit, in the July/August 2008 issue, he's since written hundreds of pieces.

== Work in education ==
In September 1986, Toczek began work as a part-time degree course lecturer in the English Department at Bretton Hall College in Wakefield. In all, he was there for eleven years during which time he developed and tutored first, second- and third-year courses in a wide variety of subjects including the short story, creative writing, film studies, post modernism, global image, aesthetics, and modernism. He also gave annual lectures in the Music Department on racism in popular music and on working independently in the music business. In May 1995, he launched the Northern School of Writing at Bretton Hall, offering a range of short-term accredited adult learning courses to the general public. These included becoming a professional writer. storytelling, journalism, stand-up comedy, investigative journalism, and writing for TV and radio, each of which he tutored or co-tutored. After he finished working at Bretton Hall in 1997, he continued to run Northern School of Writing courses independently for a couple of years. He says of this work: "We had young kids and I needed the money, but it was also a chance to self-educate in a wide variety of disciplines. All of it was every bit as steep a learning curve for me as it was for my students."

Throughout his career as a full-time writer and performer Toczek has at various times run writers’ groups, held writing residencies, tutored residential courses, presented adult education courses and has frequently been a guest writer in colleges and universities. He has also done one-day visits to schools, thousands of them in the UK as well as having done frequent schools tours around the world. Since 2008, he has worked in half a dozen countries a year via Caboodle Books and Authors Abroad. As a writer-in-schools overseas he has worked in Germany, Canada, Ireland, The Netherlands, USA, China, France, Indonesia (Borneo, Sumatra and Bali), Egypt, Kuwait, Cyprus, Italy, Malaysia, Singapore, Spain, Qatar, Russia, Thailand, Azerbaijan, Vietnam, Jordan, Switzerland, Abu Dhabi, Dubai, Brazil, Sarawak, Cambodia, Malawi, Hong Kong, Norway, Java, Brunai, Oman, Sharjah, Myanmar, Saudi Arabia, Kazakhstan, South Korea, Zambia and India.

Since September 2014, he's been resident poet-tutor at Appleton Academy in Bradford, working for First Story, and has edited the following collections of work by his students, all of them published by First Story:

- Red Roses Die First (2015) - ISBN 978-0-85748-182-5
- My Head is a Universe (2016) - ISBN 978-0-85748-223-5
- Tide In, Tide Out (2017) - ISBN 978-0-85748-238-9

and a CD of some of the pupils reading a selection from the anthology (also called Tide In, Tide Out). All of the above were with secondary pupils.

In 2017-18 he also worked with a primary group producing:

- Owls Are Always Pink (2018) - ISBN 978-0-85748-294-5

An anthology of work by secondary pupils will follow in July 2018

== Press quotes ==
"See him if you can. He's brilliant." – from a review by Geoff Mellor of Nick Toczek as stand-up comedian, The Stage (23 May 1991).

"... the most exciting visual performer we have this side of Benjamin Zephaniah" – from a review by Steven Wells of Nick Toczek as performance poet, New Musical Express (4 June 1988, p. 46, ISSN 0028-6362).

"At his best Toczek is bitter, disturbing, and political. His language gets harder and more effective with each publication" – from a review by Jeff Nuttall of Nick Toczek's two books Acts Of Violence (Wayzgoose Press) and Lies (Redbeck Press) in The Guardian (January 1980).
