= Dublin Orchestral Society =

Former orchestra in Dublin, Ireland

- Origin: Dublin
- Years active: 1898–1914

The Dublin Orchestral Society was an orchestra based in Dublin, Ireland, which was mainly active between 1898 and 1914, with a brief revival in 1927. Unique among orchestras in the British Isles, it was organised as a cooperative society.

== History ==
The Dublin Orchestral Society was founded in 1898 by the immigrant musician Michele Esposito: "Following the success of concert seasons by the visiting Hallé Orchestra in 1897 and 1898 Esposito was prompted to consider forming a permanent resident orchestra in Dublin to fill this gap." Another immediate reason appears to have been problems recently encountered at the Dublin Musical Society, and organisation founded in 1875 for the performance of large-scale choral and symphonic works, which had run into financial difficulties due to poor attendance at recent events. As for an organizational model, Esposito chose a cooperative society as established in the orchestral sector by the Società Orchestrale della Scala di Milano, being funded by a mixture of subscriptions, donations, and ticket sales as well as by a small number of patronages. In later years, it also received grants from Dublin Corporation. Members of the committee that oversaw financial and programmatic issues included, besides Esposito, W. P. Geoghegan (a former head brewer at Guinness who was reliable supporter of the arts in Dublin), Edward Martyn, and Edith Oldham, with meetings held at the Royal Irish Academy of Music.

The first season consisted of five concerts between 1 March and 7 June 1899, the inaugural concert comprising works by Gluck, Mozart, Mendelssohn, Beethoven, Wagner, and Bizet. The season continued with similarly "Classical" programmes. Only the fourth concert, on 26 April 1899, included a first performance of Esposito's Poem, Op. 44 for harp and small orchestra. Another first performance was that of Hamilton Harty's An Irish Symphony, Op. 7 on 18 May 1904. Audience numbers in the first seasons appear to have left much to be desired, incurring substantial financial deficits, which required private sponsorship to be overcome, before audience numbers gradually rose, the society being free of debt by the 1906–1907 season.

The outbreak of World War I in 1914 halted the work of the Dublin Orchestral Society. A brief revival of the society in 1927 did not prove successful. In 1929, its orchestral library was donated to the Royal Irish Academy of Music.

== Bibliography ==
- Jeremy Dibble: Michele Esposito (Dublin: Field Day Publications, 2010), ISBN 978-0-946755-47-9.
- Harry White, Barra Boydell (eds): The Encyclopaedia of Music in Ireland (Dublin: UCD Press, 2013), ISBN 978-1-906359-78-2.
