= Roy Agnew =

Australian composer

Roy Ewing "Robert" Agnew (23 August 1891 – 12 November 1944) was an Australian composer, pianist, teacher, and radio announcer. He was described as "the most outstanding of the early twentieth-century Australian composers" by Morris Hinson.

== Early life and education ==
Agnew was born in Sydney on August 23, 1891, the son of Samuel Agnew, a cordial manufacturer, and his wife Maria Jane (née Miller). Agnew taught himself piano at an early age. He attended Chatswood and Hornsby public schools, and received his first formal music training from Emanuel de Beaupuis, an Italian pianist then residing in Sydney. He received further instruction from Daisy Millerand Sydney Moss, and later briefly studied composition under Alfred Hill at the NSW Conservatorium of Music. He began working as a piano teacher in Marrickville in 1911.

By this time, Agnew was already writing "strikingly original works," which abandoned "the limitations of key and tonal relationship." His first music work to be published was Australian Forest Pieces for Piano in 1913. However, Agnew's music did not receive much public attention until international pianist Benno Moiseiwitsch gave a recital of his works, Deirdre's Lament and Dance of the Wild Men, at a Sydney Town Hall matinee in August 1920. Partly through funding by friends and supporters, Agnew was able to travel to London in 1923 to study composition and orchestration with Gerard Williams, and Cyril Scott at the Royal College of Music.

== Career and later life ==
While in London, Agnew gave recitals of works by contemporary composers such as Claude Debussy and Igor Stravinsky, while his own Fantasie Sonata was premiered in London in 1927 by William Murdoch. Augener Ltd. of London began to publish his pieces, and in the United States, he also found a publisher in Arthur P. Schmidt of New York.

In 1928, Agnew returned to Sydney, where he gave several recitals of his music, and his "poem for orchestra and voice," The Breaking of the Drought, was performed with Alfred Hill conducting. In 1931, he left again for Britain, where he gave performances of his works at the Lyceum, at the George Woodhouse Studio in London, and in Glasgow. He also gave many performances for the BBC.

After remaining in Britain for three years, Agnew returned home again in December 1934 for a tour sponsored by the Australian Broadcasting Commission (ABC), and in September of that year, he advertised a series of private lessons in "Practical Composition" and "General Interpretation and the Art of Pedalling" in Melbourne. In May of the following year, he gave two radio recitals of his works. A number of his works were also performed and orchestrated in Australia by other musicians at this time.

In January 1938, Agnew was engaged by the ABC to compere a weekly program on contemporary music, dubbed the "Modern and Contemporary Composers' Session." Agnew featured composers such as Webern, Berg, Busoni, Szymanowski, Debussy, Stravinsky, and Scriabin, and sometimes performed the pieces himself. The program became so popular that it ran for five years. It was no doubt strongly influenced by the example of Edward Clark, whose broadcasts Agnew had heard in Britain. Clark was a student of Arnold Schoenberg, closely connected to all the members of the Second Viennese School, and went on to become a ground-breaking BBC producer and broadcaster and to conduct some important British and world premieres.

Agnew also composed a second program, "Music Through the Ages: The Piano and its Composers," featuring mostly classical composers such as Giles Farnaby, Domenico Scarlatti, Mozart, and Chopin, which Agnew played himself.

In 1939, he won first prize for his sonata ballade from the Musical Association of New South Wales, which he later recorded for Columbia. In 1943, he recorded fifty of his compositions for ABC. While these recordings remain a valuable record of his playing, they are somewhat marred by the fact that the limited technology of the period forced him to hurry over some passages to fit them onto tape.

In 1944, Agnew's last major work, the Sonata Legend (Capricornia), was publicly performed for the first time by Alexander Sverjensky at the Sydney Conservatorium. In February of that year, Agnew accepted a position at the Conservatorium.

He developed a warm relationship with the piano teacher Winifred Burston, who introduced his works to her students, such as Larry Sitsky and Richard Meale.

Agnew died unexpectedly, aged 53, on 12 November 1944, from sepsis following a bout of tonsillitis. His estate, upon his death, was valued at £547.

== Personal life ==
Agnew married Kathleen Olive, the youngest daughter of the late judge and former senator Richard O'Connor, at St. Mary's Cathedral on November 8, 1930. The marriage resulted in no children. He has been described as a quiet, gentle, and unassuming man, for whom life outside his music, his home, and his garden "was not very concrete or real". He also enjoyed surfing and walking.

== Music ==
Agnew, one of the few Australian composers of his generation to achieve international recognition, has been described as "the most outstanding of the early twentieth century Australian composers". The "archetypal pianist-composer", the overwhelming body of his work was written for solo piano, with only occasional ventures into orchestral or other forms.

All critics have noted the influence of Scriabin on Agnew's music, while others have variously detected affinities with John Ireland, Ravel, Debussy, Liszt, Busoni, Cyril Scott, Frank Bridge, and Arnold Bax. The English critic Sir Neville Cardus notes that regardless of his influences, Agnew "made everything second nature to his essentially lyrical imagination." Cardus also observes that he had a "sure feeling" for atmospherics, especially in his smaller works.

Agnew's most important works are generally considered to be his six piano sonatas (it appears that Agnew wrote eight, but two early examples have been lost). The overall style of these has been described as "highly pianistic, full of fantasy and color, and technically demanding" while incorporating "a forward-looking harmonic vocabulary". Larry Sitsky has noted that Agnew's four later sonatas (excluding the more recently discovered Sonata 1929) have an unusual progression: the first has four central musical themes, the second three, the third two, and the last, the Sonata Legend, is monothematic. Each has its particular appeal and challenges, but Sitsky suggests that in addition to this progression "toward an economy of themes and expression," Agnew's work also grew more conservative as he grew older. Sitsky feels this may have been due to the unconscious influence of the conservatism of the Australian musical establishment of the era. In addition to the sonatas, Sitsky also names the "preludes and poems" as "important additions to the Australian repertoire" that "make fine impressions in concert programmes".

While other early twentieth-century Australian composers were "discovered" and rehabilitated in the 1970s and after by a new generation of Australian critics, Agnew's relatively early death in 1944 made him the "forgotten figure" of the period. Only in the 1990s did his music begin to attract attention once again. His contribution is now widely acknowledged, and the Australian music publisher Keys Press has published a complete edition of his works.

== Selected works ==
=== Orchestral ===
The Breaking of the Drought, 1928

=== Piano ===
==== Sonatas ====
Symphonic Poéme
Fantasie Sonata (1927)
Sonata 1929 (1929)
Sonata Poeme (1936)
Sonata Ballade (1939)
Sonata Legend (Capricornia) (1940)

==== Other piano works ====
Australian Forest Pieces (1913)
Dance of the Wild Men (1919)
Deirdre's Lament (1922)
Poème Tragique (1922)
4 Preludes (1925) – Also some duets, and over 60 other solo pieces
Rhapsody (1928)
Rabbit Hill (1928)
Youthful Fancies (1936)
Holiday Suite (1937)

=== Songs ===
Beloved stoop down thro' the clinging dark (Z. Cross Smith) (1913)
O moonlight deep and tender (Lowell) (1913)
Dirge (1924)
Dusk (R. Williams) (1926)
Infant Joy (W. Blake) (1926)
Two Songs without Words (for violin and clarinet, 1928)
Beauty (J. Masefield) (1935)
The flowers of sleep (V. Daley) (1935)

== Recordings ==
- The poet sings (Lisa Harper-Brown – soprano, David Wickham – piano), Stone Records 2012
- Capricornia for piano 1930 (National Film & Sound Archive, Australia)
