= Charles Hubert Oldham =

Irish economics professor (1859–1926)

Charles Hubert Oldham (1859–1926) was an Irish economics professor.

== Early life ==
Born in Monkstown, Dublin, Oldham was educated at Kingstown Grammar School, and then studied at Trinity College Dublin. His sisters were Edith Best (who married Richard Irvine Best) and Alice Oldham. His elder brother Eldred (seven years older than him) was a painter.

== Career ==
Oldham was the first professor of National Economics (1917 to 1926) at University College Dublin. Prior to that, he had been professor of commerce (1909 to 1917). Oldham was a prominent member of the Statistical and Social Inquiry Society of Ireland, for whom he was Barrington Lecturer (1895 to 1901) and President from 1924 to 1926.

== Politics ==
In his Dictionary of Irish Biography entry, Oldham is described as a "Gladstonian liberal", but also holding strong Irish nationalist sympathies as an admirer of the writings of Young Irelander Thomas Osborne Davis. A close friend of Oldham was Irish separatist and Fenian John O'Leary. Oldham managed the southern (Dublin) branch of the Irish Protestant Home Rule Association which he had founded in 1886.

== Personal life ==
Oldham was friends with analytical chemist Arthur Cranwill (treasurer of the Irish Protestant Home Rule Association), and encouraged his daughter, the future designer and metal artist Mia Cranwill to study Irish history and mythology during her visits to Dublin. Oldham married German painter Katharina (née Taesler) in the mid-1880s. They had no children, and she survived him following his death on 20 February 1926.

== Publications ==
- Oldham, C.H. (1910). "Economic development in ireland: Barrington lecture 1899/1900". Journal of the Statistical and Social Inquiry Society of Ireland. X: 548.
- Oldham, C.H. (1910). "The History of Belfast Shipbuilding". Journal of the Statistical and Social Inquiry Society of Ireland. 12: 417.
- Oldham, C. H. (March 1920). "The Public Finances of Ireland". The Economic Journal. 30 (117): 61. doi:10.2307/2223195. hdl:2262/4311.
