= Hamilton Harty =

Irish composer and conductor (1879–1941)

External audio
- Shellac recordings with Hamilton Harty in the Online Archive of the Österreichische Mediathek

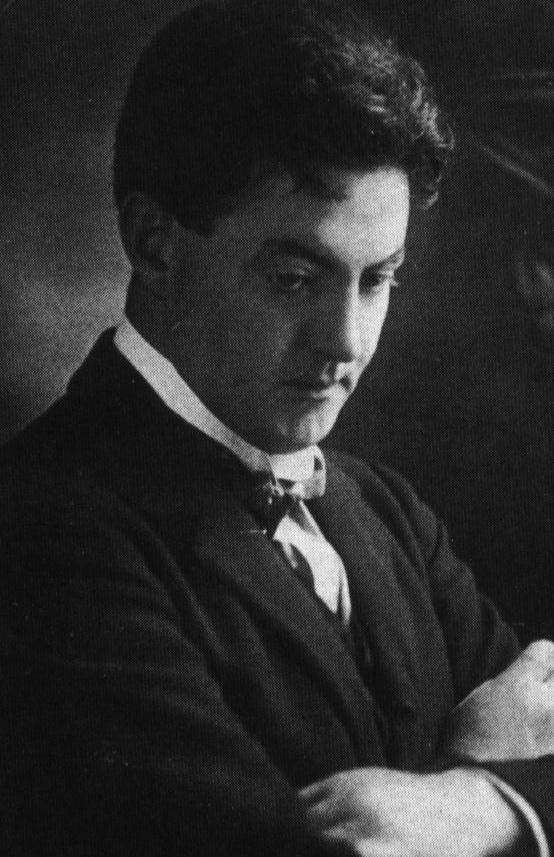
Harty c. 1920

Sir Herbert Hamilton Harty (4 December 1879 – 19 February 1941) was an Irish composer, conductor, pianist and organist.

After an early career as a church organist in his native Ireland, Harty moved to London at about age 20, soon becoming a well-known piano accompanist. The Musical Times called him "the prince of accompanists". As a composer he wrote throughout his career, many of his works being well received, though few are regularly performed in the 21st century.

In his career as a conductor, which began in 1904, Harty was particularly noted as an interpreter of the music of Berlioz. From 1920 to 1933 he was the chief conductor of the Hallé Orchestra in Manchester, which he returned to the high standards and critical acclaim that it had enjoyed under its founder, Charles Hallé. His last permanent post was with the London Symphony Orchestra, but it lasted only two years, from 1932 to 1934. During his conducting career, Harty made some recordings with his orchestras. Shortly after his dismissal by the LSO, Harty began to suffer the symptoms of a brain tumour. After surgery, he resumed his career until 1940, but the tumour returned to cause his death at the age of 61.

== Life and career ==
=== Early years ===
Harty was born in Hillsborough, County Down, Ireland, the fourth of ten children of an Anglican (Church of Ireland) church organist, William Michael Harty (1852–1918), and his wife, Annie Elizabeth, the daughter of Joseph Hamilton Richards, a soldier from Bray, County Wicklow. Harty's father taught him the viola, the piano and counterpoint, and, at the age of 12, he followed his father's profession and was appointed organist of Magheragall Parish Church, County Antrim. He took further posts in his teenage years as a church organist in Belfast and Bray. While in the latter, he came under the influence of Michele Esposito, professor of piano at the Royal Irish Academy of Music, who encouraged him to pursue a career as a piano accompanist. As Bray is only 12 miles from Dublin, Harty was able go into the city to hear an orchestra for the first time in his life.

=== Accompanist, composer and conductor ===
In 1900 or 1901, Harty moved to London to further his career. The biographer Michael Kennedy wrote that Harty quickly became known both as "a promising composer and as an outstanding accompanist." The Musical Times later called him "the prince of accompanists". Of Harty's early compositions, Kennedy singles out the Trio (1901) and Piano Quartet (1904) and the Comedy Overture, premiered at the Proms in 1907. The Times said of this piece:

It proved to be one of the most successful works the season has brought forth. The frank jollity of its themes and the clearness of their expression, both as regards orchestration and formal structure, make it a delightful "Promenade" piece – that is to say, one which tired people can enjoy at a first hearing and find refreshment in listening to. ... The overture was played with evident enjoyment and great spirit by the orchestra under Mr. Wood.

Among those whom Harty accompanied in his early days in London was the soprano Agnes Nicholls, whom he married on 15 July 1904. In the same year, Harty made his debut as a conductor, in the first performance of his Irish Symphony by the Dublin Orchestral Society, at the Feis Ceoil music festival in Dublin. Reviewing the premiere, The Times called the piece, "a work of much promise ... received with enthusiasm. It has many ideas, always freshly expressed, and the airs are developed with more than common variety and beauty." The following year, Harty's arrangement of Irish songs was included alongside works of Stanford and Vaughan Williams at a recital by Harry Plunket Greene. Among Harty's compositions from these years, Kennedy mentions a setting of Keats's "Ode to a Nightingale" (1907), a Violin Concerto (1908) dedicated to and premiered by Joseph Szigeti, the tone poem With the Wild Geese (1910) and the cantata The Mystic Trumpeter to words by Walt Whitman (1913).

Through his wife's professional connections, Harty secured his first important conducting engagement in London. He conducted the London Symphony Orchestra (LSO) in a performance of With the Wild Geese in March 1911. The performance was well received, and Harty was engaged to conduct the LSO again during its 1912–13 season. Hoping to repeat his success as a composer-conductor, he gave the first performance of his Variations on a Dublin Air in February 1913. His concerts this time were not successful with the critics or the public, and the orchestra made a loss. Although the LSO did not invite him back for the next season, Harty was invited to conduct Tristan und Isolde and Carmen at Covent Garden in 1913. His performance as an operatic conductor was less than a triumph. After Carmen, the critic of The Times complained that "Mr Harty's rigid beat and inflexible tempi petrified [the] delicate and fragile phrases, and made them sound like quotations from some forgotten German score". Harty later admitted that he was not greatly in sympathy with opera as a genre: "Opera seems to me a form of art in which clumsy attempts are made at defining the indefinable suggestions of music. Or else one in which the author of a plot and his actors are hampered by music which prolongs their gestures and action to absurdity and obscures the sense of their words."

=== Hallé Orchestra ===
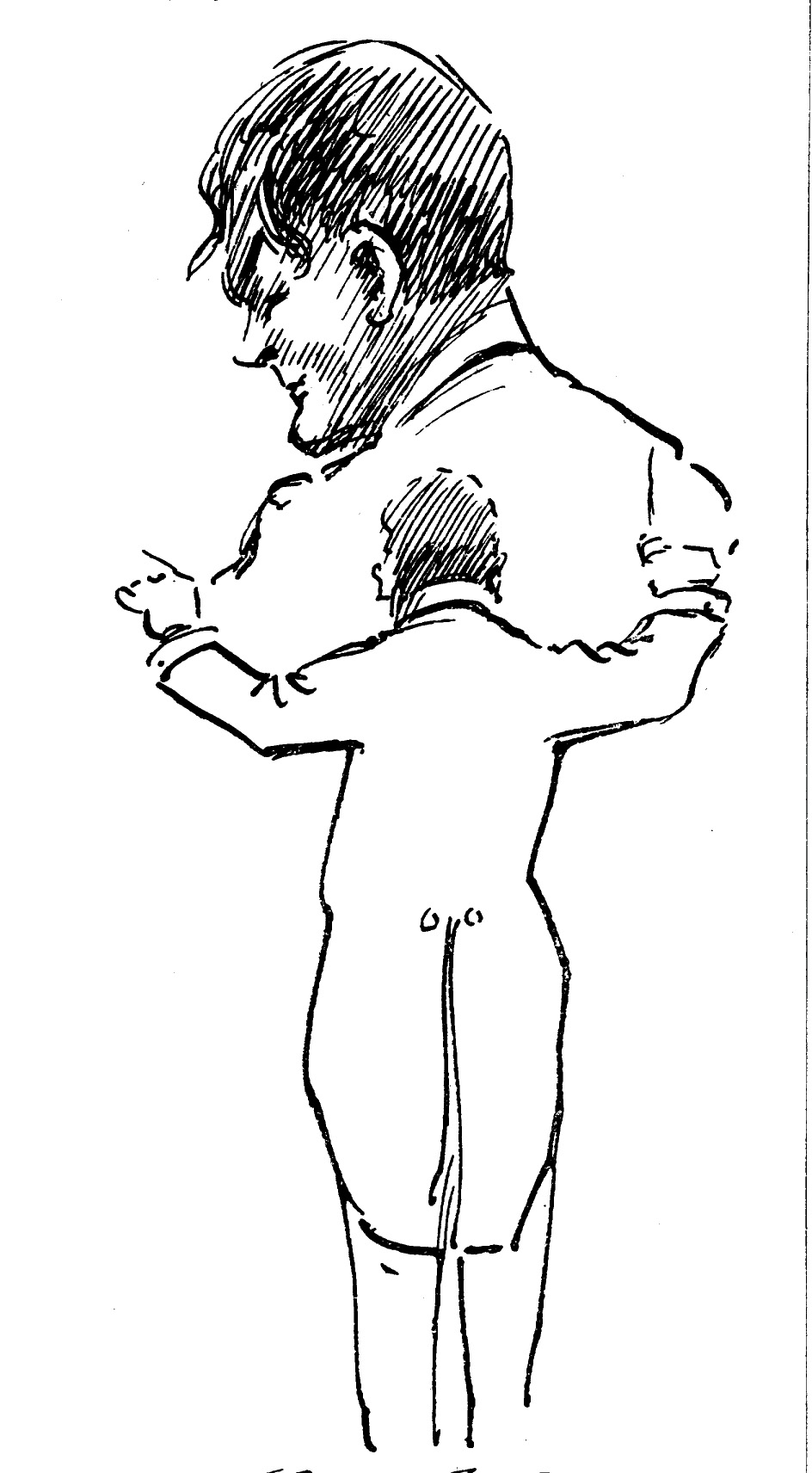
Harty sketched by a member of the Hallé, c. 1920

Returning to symphonic music, Harty conducted the Liverpool Philharmonic Orchestra in January 1914, and in April he made his début with the Hallé Orchestra in Manchester. During the First World War he joined the Royal Naval Volunteer Reserve and was posted for duties in the North Sea. He rose to the rank of lieutenant before being demobilised in June 1918. He resumed his association with the Hallé, replacing the indisposed Sir Thomas Beecham for performances of Handel's Messiah in December 1918, Bach's B minor Mass, and Schubert's Great C major Symphony in March 1919. In The Manchester Guardian, Samuel Langford wrote, "Mr. Harty has latterly achieved far more immediate control over the orchestra, and his spirit, judgment, and control were … equally admirable."

Harty was appointed permanent conductor of the Hallé in 1920. Under his baton, the Hallé recovered the eminence it had previously enjoyed under the conductorship of its founder, Charles Hallé, and his successor, Hans Richter. Kennedy writes that under Harty it was probably the best orchestra in England. Harty's skill as a piano accompanist developed into a similar talent for conducting concertos. Writing of his skill as in accompanying either as a pianist or as a conductor, John F. Russell wrote in 1941, "Anybody who heard Harty in his capacity as accompanist could never forget his extraordinary grasp of every nuance and expressive device. There was no question of a solo with accompaniment: unless the soloist was a very great artist the chances were that he would be submerged by the artistry of the accompanist." Wilhelm Backhaus and others wished they could take the Hallé with them on their international travels. During a Brahms concerto, Artur Schnabel accidentally skipped two bars, but Harty's rapport with and control of the Hallé was such that he kept up seamlessly with the soloist. Schnabel said afterward that he had never experienced such magnificent accompaniment, but tactlessly added that the Hallé was "almost as good as the Berlin Philharmonic"; Harty corrected him: the Hallé was "better by two bars".

Harty introduced many new works and composers to Hallé audiences. His passion for the music of Berlioz was reflected in his programming, and he regularly performed works by contemporary composers including Bax, Moeran, Sibelius, Richard Strauss and Walton. Kennedy numbers among the outstanding occasions of Harty's conductorship the English premieres of Mahler's Ninth Symphony (1930) and Shostakovich's First Symphony (1932), the Halle's first performances of Mahler's Fourth Symphony (1927) and Das Lied von der Erde (1930); and the first public performance of Constant Lambert's The Rio Grande (1929), with Harty as pianist and the composer conducting. As a composer, Harty's best-known works from this period are his lavish reorchestrations of Handel's Water Music and Music for the Royal Fireworks. Harty was knighted in the 1925 Birthday Honours. In 1926 he commissioned a symphony from Moeran, whose Symphony in G minor (1937) was the result, but Harty was too ill to conduct the premiere.

=== Last years ===
Hamilton Harty

In 1932 Harty accepted the post of artistic adviser and conductor in chief of the London Symphony Orchestra. The committee of the Hallé felt that this appointment was "not compatible with the whole-hearted devotion to the interests of the Hallé Orchestra", and it decided not to renew Harty's contract when it ended in 1933.

In 1933, he was conferred an honorary Doctor of Laws by Queens University Belfast.

The Hallé committee made its decision public in a way that Harty found distressing. He had his revenge by encouraging his new orchestra to poach eight of the Hallé's leading players to replenish the LSO's ranks, which had recently been depleted by defections to Beecham's new London Philharmonic Orchestra. In London, however, Harty did not prove to be a box-office draw, and according to a historian of the orchestra, Richard Morrison, Harty was "brutally and hurtfully" dropped in 1934, as an LSO predecessor, Sir Edward Elgar, had been in 1911.

In the spring of 1934, Harty sailed for Australia. A fellow passenger on the ocean voyage was a young woman, Lorie Bolland, with whom Harty rapidly fell in love, though there is no evidence of reciprocity on her part. Harty dedicated two piano pieces to her: Spring Fancy, composed for her birthday on 23 April 1934, and Portrait, written at sea and dated 9 July 1934. These pieces commemorate an episode in the composer's life which had remained private until their rediscovery among Bolland's papers in 2010.

In 1935, Harty seems to have still been well, taking part in five concerts at the British Musicians' Pension Society convalescent home in Holmwood, possibly as conductor or pianist, his role being unrecorded. In 1936 his health began to deteriorate: he was diagnosed with a malignant brain tumour. It was operable, but his right eye had to be removed with the growth. During 1937 and 1938 Harty convalesced in Ireland and Jamaica, using the time to resume composition. He set five Irish songs and wrote his last original composition, the tone poem The Children of Lir. He returned to conducting in May 1938 at the Morecambe Music Festival and in December 1938, he conducted a studio concert with the BBC Symphony Orchestra. He appeared at a London concert for the first time since the operation, in March 1939, conducting the BBC Symphony Orchestra in the premiere of The Children of Lir. He conducted extensively during the 1939–40 season, but his health declined once more with a recurrence of the cancer, and his last public appearance was in December 1940.

Harty and his wife had become estranged, and he was nursed through his final illness by his secretary and intimate friend, Olive Elfreda Baguley. He died in Hove at the age of 61. He was cremated, and his ashes were interred in the grounds of Hillsborough parish church.

== Recordings ==
According to the Grove Dictionary of Music and Musicians, "Recordings capture the brilliance of [Harty's] conducting. They include The Rio Grande, Walton's First Symphony, some outstanding Berlioz extracts and Elgar's Enigma Variations and Cello Concerto (with W.H. Squire)." Harty was the conductor of a well-known 1929 recording of Nymphs and Shepherds with the Manchester Children's Choir. It was a frequent radio request for many years, and was awarded a gold disc by EMI in 1989. Though few of Harty's compositions continue to be regularly programmed in the concert hall and even the once-popular Handel arrangements have fallen from favour in the era of authentic period performance, all of the orchestral works have now been recorded, notably by the Ulster Orchestra. Hyperion released recordings of the Piano Quintet and the two String Quartets in 2012, performed by Piers Lane and the Goldner String Quartet. A CD of 25 songs (17 first recordings), performed by Kathryn Rudge and Christopher Glynn, was issued in June 2020.

== Selected works ==
Orchestral

- An Irish Symphony (1904, rev. 1915, 1924)
- A Comedy Overture (1906)
- Violin Concerto (1908)
- With the Wild Geese, symphonic poem (1910)
- Variations on a Dublin Air, for violin and orchestra (1912)
- Fantasy Scenes from an Eastern Romance (1919)
- Piano Concerto in B minor (1922)
- The Children of Lir, symphonic poem (1938)

Orchestral arrangements of Handel

- Suite from the Water Music (1922)
- Suite from Music for the Royal Fireworks (1924)
- Polonaise, Op. 6, No. 3 (1932)
- Arietta and Passacaglia from Rodrigo (1932)
- Organ Concerto in D major (1934)
- Introduction and Rigaudon for orchestra (1935)

Other orchestral arrangements

- The Londonderry Air – arranged for solo violin, string orchestra and harp (1924)
- A John Field Suite – arrangements of piano music by John Field (1939)

Chamber

- String Quartet in F major, Op. 1 (c.1900)
- 2 Fantasiestücke, Op. 3 for violin, cello, piano (c.1901)
- String Quartet in A minor, Op. 5 (c.1902)
- Fantasia for two pianos, Op. 6 (1902)
- Romance and Scherzo, Op. 8 for cello and piano (1903)
- Idyl: Arlequin et Colombine, Op. 10 for piano (1904)
- Irish Fancies for piano (c.1904)
- Piano Quintet in F major, Op. 12 (c.1904)
- Two Pieces for cello and piano: 1. Waldesstille; 2. Der Schmetterling (1907)
- À la Campagne for oboe and piano (1911)
- Chansonette for oboe and piano (1911)
- Orientale for oboe and piano (1911)
- Irish Fantasy for violin and piano (1912)
- Spring Fancies, two Preludes for harp (1915)
- In Ireland, Fantasy for flute and piano (1918); arranged for flute, harp and orchestra (1935)
- Suite for Cello and Piano (1928)

Carillon

- A Little Fantasy and Fugue (1934)

Vocal

(songs for voice and piano, if not otherwise mentioned)

- Across the Door (Pádraic Colum) (1913)
- Antrim and Donegal (Moira O'Neill, Elizabeth Shane), four songs (1926)
- Bonfires (W.L. Bultitaft) (1905)
- By the Bivouac's Fitful Flame (Walt Whitman) (1912)
- Come, O Come, My Life's Delight (Thomas Campion) (1907)
- A Cradle Song (P. Colum) (1913)
- The Devon Maid (John Keats) (1913)
- A Drover (P. Colum) (1913)
- Five Irish Poems: A Mayo Love Song (Alice Milligan), At Easter (Helen Lanyon), The Sailor Man (M. O'Neill), Denny's Daughter (M. O'Neill), The Fiddler of Dooney (William Butler Yeats) (1938)
- An Irish Love Song (Katherine Tynan) (1908)
- Lane o' the Thrushes (Cathal O'Byrne) (1907)
- The Mystic Trumpeter (W. Whitman) for baritone, chorus and orchestra (1913)
- Now is the Month of Maying (anon.) (1907)
- Ode to a Nightingale (J. Keats) for soprano and orchestra (1907)
- The Ould Lad (M. O'Neill) (1906)
- The Rachray Man (M. O'Neill) (1913)
- A Rann of Wandering (P. Colum) (1914)
- Rose Madness (W.L. Bultitaft) (1903)
- Scythe Song (Riccardo Stephens) (1910)
- The Sea Gipsy (Richard Hovey) (1912)
- Sea-Wrack (M. O'Neill) (1905)
- The Song of Glen Dun (M. O'Neill) (1902)
- Song of the Constant Lover (John Suckling) (1909)
- Song of the Three Mariners (anon.) (1907)
- The Splendour Falls (Alfred Tennyson) part-song (1901)
- The Stranger's Grave (Emily Lawless) (1913)
- Tell Me Not, Sweet, I am Unkind (Richard Lovelace) (1909)
- Three Flower Songs Op. 13: Poppies, Mignonette, Gorse (1906)
- To the King (R. Stephens) w/ organ obbligato (1911)
- The Wake Feast (A. Milligan) (1914)
- When Summer Comes (Harold Simpson) (1909)
- Your Hand in Mine, Beloved (H. Simpson) (1908)

Traditional songs

(arranged for voice and piano)

- Colleen's Wedding Song (Patrick Weston Joyce) (1905)
- Six Songs of Ireland Op. 18: Lookin' Back (M. O'Neill), Dreaming (Cahir Healy), Lullaby (C. O'Byrne), Grace for Light (M. O'Neill), Flame in the Skies (Lizzie Twigg), At Sea (M. O'Neill) (1908)
- Three Sea Prayers from the Greek Anthology, for voice & piano: To the Gods of Harbour and Headland, Saved by Faith, To Apollo of Leucas (1909)
- Three Irish Folk Songs (P.W. Joyce): The Lowlands of Holland, The Fairy King's Courtship, The Game Played in Erin-go-Bragh (1929)
- Three Traditional Ulster Airs (Seosamh MacCathmhaoil): The Blue Hills of Antrim, My Lagan Love, Black Sheela of the Silver Eye (1905)

== Bibliography ==
- Edwin Evans: "In memoriam: Frank Bridge and Sir Hamilton Harty", in The Music Review vol. 2 (1941), no. 2, pp. 159–166.
- David Greer (ed.): Hamilton Harty: His Life and Music (Belfast: Blackstaff Press, 1978), ISBN 0-85640-131-5.
- D. Greer (ed.): Hamilton Harty: Early Memories (Belfast: Queen's University, 1979), ISBN 0-85389-176-1.
- Michael Kennedy: The Hallé, 1858–1983: A History of the Orchestra (Manchester: Manchester University Press, 1982), ISBN 978-0-719009211.
- D. Greer: "The Composition of 'The Children of Lir'", in Musicology in Ireland (= Irish Musical Studies vol. 1), ed. Gerard Gillen and Harry White (Dublin: Irish Academic Press, 1990) ISBN 0-7165-2456-2, p. 74–98.
- Declan Plummer: "Hamilton Harty's Legacy with the Hallé Orchestra (1920–1930): a Reassessment", in Journal of the Society for Musicology in Ireland, vol. 5 (2010), p. 55–72, online here.
- D. Plummer: "Music based on worth": The Conducting Career of Sir Hamilton Harty (PhD thesis, Queen's University Belfast, 2011), full text online.
- Jeremy Dibble: Hamilton Harty: Musical Polymath (Woodbridge, Surrey: Boydell Press, 2013), ISBN 978-1-84383-858-6.
