= Beniamino Cesi =

Italian musician (1845–1907)

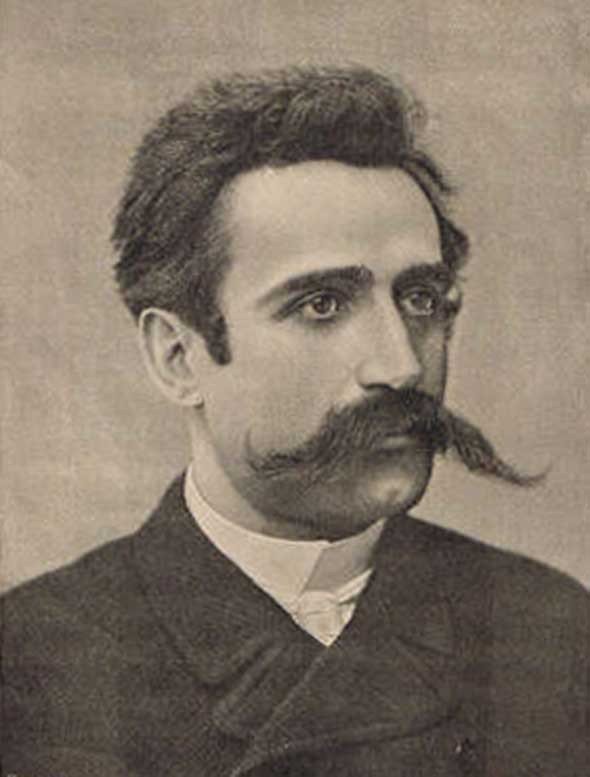
Beniamino Cesi

Beniamino Cesi (6 November 1845 – 19 January 1907) was an Italian concert pianist, composer and piano professor. He taught many of the most distinguished early 20th century pianists of the Neapolitan school, and his influence is still felt to this day.

== Training ==
Born in Naples, Cesi began studying piano under his father, and later under Carlo Albanesi. Upon hearing him perform, Sigismund Thalberg was reportedly so impressed with him that he quickly became one of his favourite pupils. He began his career as a concert performer in 1862, and word of him quickly spread throughout the entirety of Italy. At the age of 20 he won a competition for the position of piano professor at the Royal Conservatory of San Pietro a Majella in Naples. He was soon considered a front rank performer in many cities throughout Europe, including London, where he appeared in 1886. Although he was considered a great interpreter of J. S. Bach, Beethoven, Schumann and Chopin, he was also a champion of old Italian music.

When Anton Rubinstein was appointed director of the Petrograd Conservatory, he invited Cesi to direct the schools of piano playing there. Cesi accepted the appointment in 1885, and remained there until 1891, when he was forced to return to Italy due to sudden onset paralysis. This, however, left his intellect unimpaired, and still left him with the use of his right hand, and in 1894 he became a teacher in the Conservatory of Palermo, and after spending a few years there he was able to return to San Pietro a Majella, where he remained in charge of a chamber-music class until his death in 1907. His educational writings (Method for Piano) remain to this day of considerable importance, and he wrote many volumes of revision of piano music.

Among his notable pupils were Giuseppe Martucci, Alessandro Longo, Michele Esposito, Samuel Maykapar, Emanuel de Beaupuis, Edgardo del Valle De Paz and Leopoldo Mugnone.

Cesi belonged to a very musical family. His two sons Napoleone Cesi (1867–1961) and Sigismondo Cesi (1869–1936) carried on his artistic heritage. Both were pianist-composers. Napoleone published important piano compositions and won a number of prizes with them. Sigismondo co-founded the Liceo Musicale, a private music school, in Naples in 1908 with Ernesto Marciano, gave concerts in many parts of Italy, and became a well-known teacher.

Cecilia Cesi (b. Palermo in 1903, died 1984) was the daughter of Napoleone, and became a pianist, making a debut at age 6 and giving a successful concert in Naples at age 8. She also performed successfully in Rome, Milan and elsewhere in Italy.

== Writings ==
- Metodo per pianoforte, in three large sections, to be studied simultaneously.
- 1. Exercises and Studies
- 2. Polyphonic works: Fugues, canons, legato style.
- 3. Pieces: Sonatas, trios, quartets, concerti, etc. (Ricordi)

(Sigismondo Cesi): Appunti di Storia e di Letteratura del pianoforte. (Sigismondo Cesi, with E. Marciano): Prontuario di Musica (Ricordi).

== Sources ==
- Pier Paolo De Martino, Beniamino Cesi da Napoli a San Pietroburgo, in Napoli Nobilissima, IX, 2008, pp. 131–144.
- Pier Paolo De Martino, Quando a Napoli si cambiò musica, Libreria Musicale Italiana, 2024
