= Michele Esposito =

Italo-Irish composer

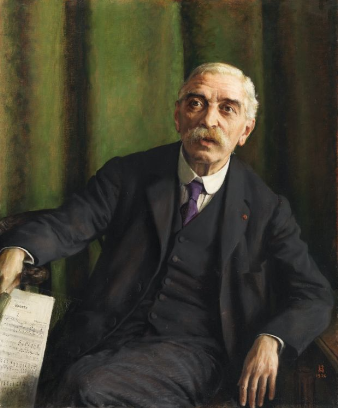

Michele Esposito (29 September 1855 – 19 November 1929) was an Italian composer, conductor and pianist who spent most of his professional life in Dublin, Ireland.

== Training ==
Esposito was born at Castellamare di Stabia, near Sorrento. As a boy, he entered the conservatory of Naples as a piano pupil of Beniamino Cesi (1845–1907, himself a favourite pupil of Thalberg), and studied composition there for 8 years under Paolo Serrao (1830–1907, teacher of Francesco Cilea and others). He was a near-contemporary of Giuseppe Martucci, and a few years the senior of Alessandro Longo, both taught by these teachers. In 1878, he went to Paris for several years.

In 1879, he married Natalia Klebnikoff (1857–1944), who hailed from St Petersburg. They had four children, including the noted scholar Mario Esposito.

== Teacher, pianist and conductor ==
Esposito became chief pianoforte professor at the Royal Irish Academy of Music in 1882, and remained there for more than forty years, devoting himself to the encouragement of classical music in Dublin. He inaugurated the Royal Dublin Society chamber-music recitals, with great success, and gave piano recitals for the Society every year. He established the Dublin Orchestral Society in 1898 and was its conductor until its disbandment in 1914, and he was also the conductor of the Sunday Orchestral Concerts until they were discontinued in 1914. He conducted concerts of the London Symphony Orchestra at Woodbrook in 1913 and 1914, and also performed his piano concerto with them under the baton of Hamilton Harty. Together with Sir Stanley Cochrane, he founded the music publishing company "C. E. Edition". In the year before his death, he returned to Italy and died in Florence.

== Composer ==
Esposito received awards from the Feis Ceoil for his cantata Deirdre, his Irish Symphony and his String Quartet in D major. His Cello Sonata won a prize from the London Incorporated Society of Musicians in 1899. His Violin Sonata in E minor gained a prize offered by La Société Nouvelle, Paris, in 1907, and his String Quartet in C minor won another offered by the Accademia Filarmonica di Bologna.

== Works ==
Stage

- The Post Bag, Op. 52 (Alfred Perceval Graves), 1-act opera (1901; vocal score, London: Boosey & Co., 1902)
- The Tinker and the Fairy, Op. 53 (Douglas Hyde), 1-act opera (1904; vocal score, Leipzig: Breitkopf & Härtel, 1910)
- Peggy Machree ("Patrick Bidwell" = Elizabeth Curtis O'Sullivan), romantic comedy with music (1904; three songs published in New York: Church, 1908)

Vocal with orchestra

- Deirdre, Op. 38 (Thomas William Rolleston), cantata for soli, chorus and orchestra (1897; vocal score, Dublin: Pigott & Co., 1899)

Orchestra (incl. concertos)

- Piano Concerto, Op. 18 (perf. 1878 in Naples, unpublished)
- Sinfonia, Op. 24 (1874, unpublished)
- Scherzo fugoso (c.1895, unpublished)
- Poem for harp and orchestra, Op. 44 (1898, unpublished)
- Othello, overture, Op. 45 (1900, unpublished)
- Oriental Suite, Op. 47 (1900, unpublished)
- Fantasia for two pianos and orchestra, Op. 48 (c.1901, unpublished)
- Sinfonia irlandese / Irish Symphony, Op. 50 (1902, Dublin: An Gúm, 1955)
- Irish Suite, Op. 55 (c.1903; Dublin: C.E. Music Publishers, 1915)
- Piano Concerto [No. 2] in F minor, Op. 68 (1912, unpublished)
- Neapolitan Suite, Op. 69 (c.1923; Dublin: C.E. Music Publishers, 1927?)

Chamber music

- Piano Trio, Op. 9 (c.1877, unpublished)
- Piano Quartet [No. 1], Op. 12 (1877, unpublished)
- Piano Quartet [No. 2], Op. 17 (1878, unpublished)
- Movement for String Quartet, Op. 21 (1882, unpublished)
- Two Pieces for Viola and Piano, Op. 22 (1881, unpublished)
- Violin Sonata [No. 1] in G major, Op. 32 (1881; London and Leipzig: Stanley Lucas, Weber, Pitt & Hatzfeld, 1892; later reissued by Schott)
- String Quartet [No.1] in D major, Op. 33 (1886; Leipzig: Breitkopf & Härtel, 1899)
- Tarantella for piano duet, Op. 35 (date?, Dublin: Pigott & Co., c.1900)
- Piano Quintet, Op. 42 (1898, unpublished)
- Cello Sonata in D major, Op. 43 (1898; Leipzig: Breitkopf & Härtel, 1899)
- Violin Sonata [No. 2] in E minor, Op. 46 (1899; Paris: G. Astruc, 1907)
- Irish Rhapsody No. 1 for violin and piano, Op. 51 (1901; Milan: Ricordi, 1909)
- Irish Rhapsody No. 2 for violin and piano, Op. 54 (1902; Milan: Ricordi, 1909)
- Five Irish Melodies for violin and piano, Op. 56 (Dublin: Pigott, 1903). Contains: Rich and Rare, The Coulin, Silent, O Moyle, Fly not yet, When through Life.
- Two Irish Airs for violin and piano, Op. 57 (London: Schott, c.1903). Contains: Farewell but whenever, Cradle Song; The Silver Tip, Irish reel.
- String Quartet [No. 2] in C minor, Op. 60 (1906; Dublin: C.E. Music Publishers, 1914)
- Violin Sonata [No. 3] in A major, Op. 67 (1913; Dublin: C.E. Music Publishers, n.d.)
- String Quartet [No. 3] in B flat major, Op. 70 (1923, unpublished)

Piano solo

- Pensiero malincolico, Op. 2 (date?; Milan: Ricordi, 1877)
- Scherzo [No. 1], Op. 3 (date?; Milan: Lucca, 1879)
- Allegro, Op. 4 (date?; Milan: Lucca, 1879)
- Allegretto, Op. 5 (date?; Milan: Lucca, 1877)
- Romanza, Op. 6 (date?; Milan: Lucca, 1879)
- Album, Op. 7 (date?; Milan: Lucca, 1879). Contains: Augurio, Malinconico, Duetto, Visione, Allegro appassionato.
- Fantasia, Op. 8 (date?; Milan: Lucca, 1879)
- Momento di fantasia, Op. 10 (date?; Milan: Lucca, 1879)
- Capriccio, Op. 11 (date?; Milan: Lucca, 1879)
- Quattro notturni, Op. 13 (date?; Milan: Lucca, 1879). Contains: Moderato, Andante, Sorrento (lento), Lento.
- Valzer op. 14 (date?; Milan: Lucca, 1879)
- Lento, Op. 16 (date?; contribution to album Alla memoria di Vincenzo Bellini, Milan: Ricordi, 1884)
- Due pezzi, Op. 19 (date?; Milan: Lucca, 1879). Contains: Andante tranquillo, Lento.
- Sei canzoni, Op. 23 (date?; Milan: Lucca, 1880). Contains: Moderato, Lento, Allegro moderato, Andante, Moderato, Semplice.
- Valzer della polenta (1881; Milan: Ricordi, 1881)
- Tre pezzi caratteristici, Op. 26 (date?; Milan: Ricordi, 1882)
- Scherzo [No. 2], Op. 28 (date?; Dublin: Pohlmann & Co., c.1882)
- Two Pieces, Op. 29 (c.1883; Dublin: Pohlmann & Co., 1883). Contains: Serenata, Improvviso.
- Four Sketches, Op. 30 (c.1883; Dublin: Pohlmann & Co., 1883). Contains: Andantino, Animato, Moderato, Vivace.
- Progressive Studies, Op. 31 (c.1883; Dublin: Pohlmann & Co., 1883). Contains 2 books of 10 studies each.
- Notturno (date?, London: Ascherberg, 1885)
- Suite, Op. 34 (date?; Leipzig: Breitkopf & Härtel, 1902). Contains: Vol. 1: Prélude, Agitato-Tranquillo, Badinage; Vol. 2: Nocturne, Valse, Petite sérénade, Rêverie.
- Deux nocturnes, Op. 36 (date?; London: Forsyth, 1898). Contains: Lento, Andante.
- Deux valses, Op. 37 (date?; London: Forsyth, 1898). Contains: Tempo di valse, Tempo lento di valse.
- Two Irish Melodies, Op. 39 (date?; Dublin: Pigott & Co., 1896). Contains: Avenging and Bright, Though the Last Glimpse of Erin.
- Ballades, Op. 59 (date?; Milan: Ricordi, 1907). Contains: Appassionato, Lento ed espressivo, Con moto ed energico.
- Three Pieces, Op. 61 (c.1912; Dublin: C.E. Music Publishers, 1930). Contains: Alba, Zenith, Tramonto.
- Impromptu, Op. 62 (1912; Dublin: C.E. Music Publishers, 1930)
- Remembrance, Op. 63 (1912; Dublin: C.E. Music Publishers, c.1930)
- A Village Fête, Op. 64 (1912; Dublin: C.E. Music Publishers, c.1930)
- Three Pieces, Op. 65 (1912; Dublin: C.E. Music Publishers, c.1930). Contains: Vain Regrets, In the Garden, At the Spinning Wheel
- Preludi, Op. 66 (1910-2; Milan: Ricordi, 1936, as part of op. 72 [nos. 2, 5, 9])
- My Irish Sketch Book, Op. 71 (date?; Dublin: C.E. Music Publishers, 1932). 12 pieces in 4 sets. Set 1: The Bard and the Fairy, The Rose-Tree, Dance and Song. Set 2: The Exile's Vision, A Song, Night Patrol. Set 3: The Little Stack of Barley, Lullaby, Jig. Set 4: King James, A Lament, Bagpipes.
- Nove preludi, Op. 72 (1910–29, incorporating op. 66; Milan: Ricordi, 1936). Contains: Allegro vivo e appassionato, Tempo di mazurka, Sostenuto, Allegro moderato, Languido, Andante moderato, Con moto e leggero, Con moto e grazioso, Lento (Pensiero elegiaco alle memoria di Giuseppe Martucci).

Songs

- Canti di Lorenzo Stecchetti, Op. 15 (date?; Milan: Lucca, 1879). Contains: Spes, ultima dea, Scritto supra un sasso, Fior di siepe.
- Trois mélodies (Théophile Gautier, Victor Hugo) (1880–1, unpublished). Details unknown.
- Tre Canti di Lorenzo Stecchetti, Op. 25 (1881, unpublished). Details unknown.
- Trois chansons, Op. 27 (Émile Blémont) (1881, unpublished). Details unknown.
- Three Irish Melodies, Op. 40 (George Sigerson) (date?; Dublin: Pigott & Co., 1897). Contains: O Hush O, The Heather Glen, Mavourneen Mine.
- Irish Melodies, Op. 41 (poets unclear) (date?). One song published: The Lark in the Clear Air (Samuel Ferguson), Op. 41.2 (Dublin: Pigott & Co., c.1898).
- Roseen Dhu, Irish Vocal Suite, Op. 49 (Alfred Perceval Graves) (1901; London: Breitkopf & Härtel, 1901). Contains: The Shadow of a Dream, My Rose of Hope, In Reasons Despite, Is it true?, Her Answer, The Clarion's Call, She Stood at my Side.
- The West's Awake (Thomas Davis) (date?; London: Boosey & Co., 1901)
- Siubal na mona (Douglas Hyde) (date?; London: Ricordi, 1911)
- Dear Land (John O'Hagan) (date?; Dublin: C.E. Music Publishers, c.1920)
- Rest, though Gentle Sea (anon.) (date?; Dublin: C.E. Music Publishers, 1920)
- Two Shelley Songs (Percy Bysshe Shelley) (1905; Dublin: C.E. Music Publishers, 1921). Contains: Time Long Past, To Night.

Choral, unaccompanied

- Seán Glas (anon.) (date?; London: Vincent, 1913)

== Recordings ==
- Ballades, Op. 59; Alla memoria di Vincenzo Bellini, Op. 16; 5 excerpts from My Irish Sketch Book, Op. 71; Preludes 1, 5, 2, 4, 9 from Nove preludi, Op. 72; Impromptu, Op. 62; Three Pieces, Op. 61; A Village Fête, Op. 64; Nocturne, Valse, Rêverie (from Suite, Op. 34, vol. 2); Remembrance, Op. 63; Visione (from Album, Op. 7). Recorded by Míċeál O'Rourke (piano), on: Esposito: Works for Piano, Chandos CHAN 9675 (CD, 1998).
- Though the Last Glimpse of Erin from Two Irish Melodies, Op. 39; and Appassionato from Ballades, Op. 59 (no. 1). Recorded by Una Hunt (piano), on: Fallen Leaves from an Irish Album, RTÉ lyric fm CD 109 (CD, 2006).
- Violin Sonatas, Opp. 32, 46, and 67, and Cello Sonata, Op. 43. Recorded by Mia Cooper (violin), William Butt (cello) and Lance Coburn (piano), on: Champs Hill Records CHRCD 066 (CD, 2013).
- Violin Sonatas, Opp. 32, 46, and 67; Irish Rhapsody No. 1, Op. 51; Irish Rhapsody No. 2, Op. 54; nos. 2, 3, 5 from Five Irish Melodies, Op. 56; no. 2 from Two Irish Airs, Op. 57. Performed by Carmelo Andreani (violin) & Vincenzo Maltempo (piano), on Brilliant Classics 95102 (double CD, 2015).

== Bibliography ==
- "Esposito, Michele" . Thom's Irish Who's Who . Dublin: Alexander Thom and Son Ltd. 1923. p. 74 – via Wikisource.
- Kees van Hoek: "Michele Esposito. Maestro of Dublin", in: The Irish Monthly 71 (June 1943), pp. 223–30.
- G. L. Aiello [= Mario Esposito]: Al musicista Michele Esposito nel primo centenario della nascita (Comune di Castellamare di Stabia, 1955).
- Carla Di Lena: "Michele Esposito", in: Dizionario Biografico degli Italiani (Rome: Istituto dell'Enciclopedia Italiana), vol. 43 (1993) (http://www.treccani.it/enciclopedia/michele-esposito_%28Dizionario-Biografico%29/).
- John Bowyer Bell: "Waiting for Mario. The Espositos, Joyce and Beckett", in: Éire-Ireland 30 (1995), pp. 7–26.
- Jeremy Dibble: Michele Esposito (Dublin: Field Day, 2010), ISBN 978-0-946755-47-9.
