= Henri Ketten =

Hungarian composer (1848–1883)

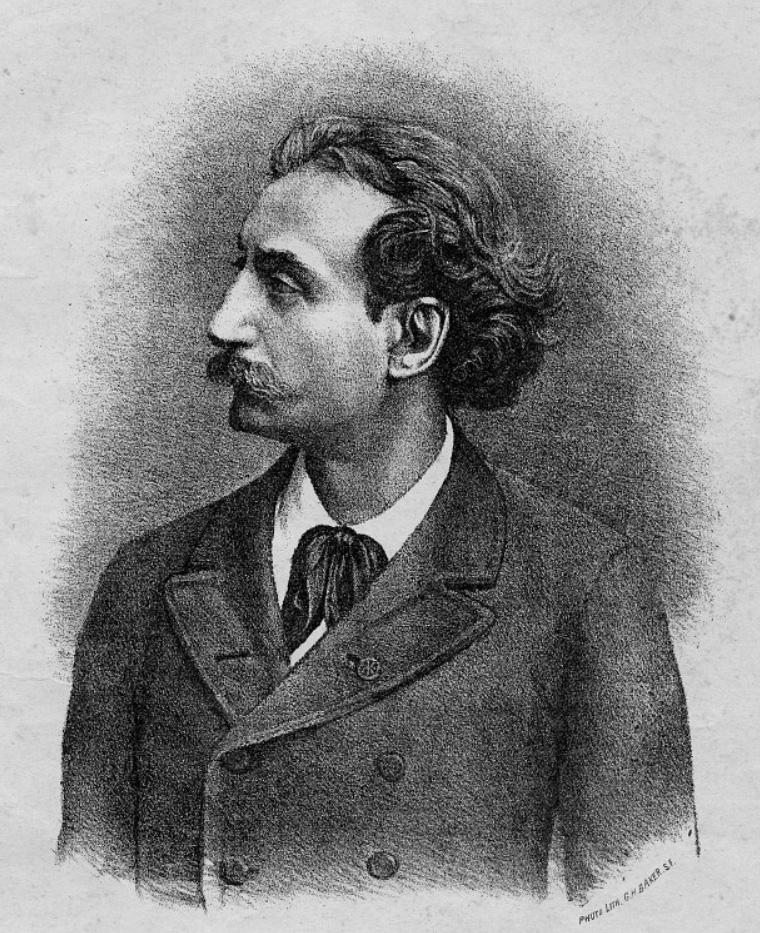
Henri Ketten (c. 1880)

Henri Ketten, also spelled Henry Ketten in English-language publications (25 March 1848 – 1 April 1883), was a Hungarian pianist and composer.

== Life and work ==
Ketten was the son of a Jewish father, who, according to a contemporary report, was himself a musician and is variously described either as a Rabbi or—more commonly in the sources—as a "ministre officiant" or cantor, including service at a synagogue in Paris.

At the age of seven, Henri gained recognition as a child prodigy and received praise from Hans von Bülow (although not all critics agreed with this assessment), who recommended him to Liszt. Press articles even promoted Ketten as a "second Mozart", while other commentators cautioned against such comparisons so as not to place excessive pressure on the young talent too early. Ketten's first concert in Paris is said to have taken place in the salon of Herz in the presence of the city's musical elite. Those present, including Fromental Halévy and Giacomo Meyerbeer, reportedly praised the ten-year-old's performance. A contemporary Hungarian newspaper report also relayed a favourable opinion by Franz Liszt and Daniel Auber.

A portrait of the young Ketten, based on a lithograph by Émile Desmaisons, appeared in 1859 in The Illustrated London News under the heading "Master Henri Ketten", in connection with a favourable review of an eleven-year-old's concert in London.

Ketten studied at the Paris Conservatoire, where he studied piano with Marmontel and composition with Fromental Halévy and Napoléon-Henri Reber. He pursued a career as a piano virtuoso, also performing his own works. He appeared, among other places, in Paris (including the Salle Pleyel), London (Covent Garden ["his fine playing has been enthusiastically applauded"], Hanover Square Rooms (also called Queen's Concert Rooms) and St. James Hall), Birmingham, Vienna (including performances for Bösendorfer at the World Exhibition Palace and at the Salle Bösendorfer in the Palais Lichtenstein), Rome, Genoa, Naples, Cairo, Amsterdam, Australia (apparently with great success there: "the greatest virtuoso who has ever visited Australia"; reportedly 437 pieces in 37 concerts [including 17 Beethoven sonatas], none repeated; earnings reportedly about 40,000 marks) and New Zealand, the United States (apparently not everywhere successfully), Germany and, shortly before his death, at the invitation of Rubinstein in Moscow. He also toured France with Gabriel Fauré.

Ketten may have been the first to make Bach's Italian Concerto known in France. His performance of the Italian Concerto was praised by George Bernard Shaw, who otherwise did not greatly appreciate Ketten's style. Henrique Oswald was among his pupils.

He left, among other works, several salon pieces, a sonata for piano and clarinet, a Persian march for orchestra, various songs, several operas and two symphonies. Around 100 of his works were published in France (including by Heugel et fils, by Leduc, and by Lemoine), in England (including by Czerny), and in Germany (according to historical newspaper reports, including by Schott in Mainz). Ketten's La Castagnette was performed, among others, by Manuel de Falla. In 1874 he was awarded the Order of the Lion and the Sun by the Shah of Persia. Jean-Jacques Henner painted a portrait of Ketten.

Ketten reportedly spoke fluent Hungarian, German, French and English. He was married to the Italian (or, according to other reports, of Italian descent) Beatrice Maria Julia Pellegrini (born c. 1856), the daughter of a lawyer from Constantinople. He met her there in 1868 and initially lived with her without being married, and she was the author of a novel (Madamigella di Cardeilhan) and a novella (Une nuit sur le Bosphore). The couple divorced in 1877; according to newspaper reports, a pupil and "house friend" of Ketten's repeatedly gave cause for the divorce proceedings (although the wife in the trial apparently also accused her husband of adultery).

Ketten had a son (Maurice Prosper Fiorino Ketten, born 2 March 1875 in Florence, died 1965; cartoonist, trained at the École nationale des beaux-arts and the University of Paris), who was awarded to him in the divorce proceedings and for whose benefit Marmontel organised a benefit concert in the year after Ketten's death

== Literature ==
- "Allgemeine deutsche Musikzeitung: Wochenschrift für die Reform des Musiklebens der Gegenwart". Allgemeine deutsche Musikzeitung (in German). 10 July 1874. p. 147 – via Google Books.
