= Mario Esposito (scholar) =

Mario Esposito (7 September 1887 – 19 February 1975) was an Irish and Italian scholar who specialised in Hiberno-Latin studies.

== Career ==
Esposito was born in Dublin, the third of four children of Michele Esposito, an Italian, and Natalia Klebnikoff (1857–1944), who hailed from St. Petersburg. Michele was an influential music professor at the Royal Irish Academy of Music. The couple met in Naples, were married in London in 1879, and their oldest daughter was born in Paris before the family settled in Ireland in 1882. Mario's godfather was Beniamino Cesi, Michele's former tutor. The children were raised speaking English, German, Italian, French and Russian. The family were well known in the artistic and literary circles of Dublin and numbered James Joyce and Samuel Beckett among their acquaintances. The 1901 census lists the family living at 50 Serpentine Avenue in Dublin and renders Mario's first name as 'Marius'.

In 1905, Esposito entered Trinity College Dublin and was awarded a BA in 1912. He was elected a member of the Royal Irish Academy in 1910. Much of his early researches were undertaken in the manuscript collections of Irish and British libraries. Esposito moved to Florence in 1920, a move which facilitated his already advanced work on Hiberno-Latin material in continental libraries and particularly in Italy and the Vatican.

Although Esposito never held a formal academic post, his scholarly output was prolific. He published his first article (on Dicuil) in the Dublin Review at the age of eighteen and produced a steady stream of publications for much of the rest of his life.

According to Michael Lapidge, Esposito "did more than any scholar before or since to appreciate and define Latin learning in medieval Ireland". In 1988 twenty of his publications were anthologised and published as Latin Learning in Mediaeval Ireland, in 1990 another sixteen as Irish books and learning in mediaeval Europe and in 2006 twenty more as Studies in Hiberno-Latin Literature.

In the last decade of his life, he suffered with poor eyesight. He never married and died in Florence, aged 87, and was cremated.
