= Irish Protestant Home Rule Association =

Irish Protestant Home Rule Association was founded in Belfast in the Castle Restaurant in Donegall Place on 21 May 1886 to support Gladstones Home Rule bill for Ireland among members of the various Protestant faiths, following a defeat in the House of Commons.

On 23 June 1886, the inaugural meeting of the Dublin branch of the Irish Protestant Home Rule Association held in the Central Hall, Westmoreland St., Dublin.

The Association was founded following a split in the Liberal Party in Ulster among those who supported home rule (Gladstonian Liberals) and the larger number who were Liberal Unionist who formed the Ulster Liberal Unionist Association

Its membership and support came from Liberal Protestants and Trade Unionists. Sometimes the Association was referred to as the Irish Protestant Home Rule Union or Irish Protestant Home Rule League. One of the founders was Portadown Liberal Thomas Shillington, a losing candidate in the 1885 election in North Armagh. The trade unionist Alexander Bowman served as its secretary, other members included Prof. Charles Hubert Oldham who managed the southern branch of the IPHRA.

The association held meetings around Ireland, which were addressed by Protestant members of civic society including clergy of the main Protestant denominations.

In 1892 the Association issued a letter indicating that it was Anti-Parnellite.
