= Wayzgoose Press =

Australian independent publisher

Wayzgoose Press is an independent private press founded in 1986 by Michael Hudson (1939–2021) and Jadwiga Jarvis (1947–2021).

Established in Katoomba, New South Wales, Australia, and operational until 2021, the press produced more than 20 handprinted limited-edition books, around 50 limited-edition broadside posters, countless short-run ephemera including printed keepsakes, and contributions to journals such as Bookways: A Quarterly Journal of Book Arts (USA) and Matrix: A Review for Printers & Bibliophiles (Whittington Press, UK).

The papers, correspondence, sales records, process drawings and blocks and collected works of the Wayzgoose Press are now held as an archive in the State Library of Victoria.

== Michael Hudson ==
Michael (Mike) Hudson was born in London in 1939 and studied design at the Hornsey College of Art, where he later became a senior lecturer in photography. He worked in the UK and in Australia as a graphic designer and photographer. His graphic skills included letterpress, calligraphy, typography, wood engraving and wood cut, linocut and bookbinding.

Upon moving to Australia in 1981, Hudson joined the NSW Guild of Craft Bookbinders and the Crafts Council, writing a chapter in the Craft Australia Yearbook 1984 on Book Arts. Once the press was established, he devoted all his time to Wayzgoose Press output but remained a member of organisations devoted to ephemera and wood engraving. He also produced wood engravings for Alec Bolton's Canberra-based Brindabella Press.

== Jadwiga Jarvis ==
Jadwiga Jarvis was born in 1947 in Krakow, Poland, to Simon Halbreich and Klara Gross. Her family moved briefly to Israel, where she was known as Jael. In 1963, she studied art at the Hornsey College of Art. In 1968, Jadwiga moved to Australia with her family, changing her surname to Jarvis. In the late 1970s, she met Mike Hudson in the UK and he moved to Australia with her.

During the 1970s Jadwiga worked as an animator on Dot and the Kangaroo for her uncle Yoram Gross, pioneering a number of traditional animation techniques. She continued to work in the animation industry for a number of years after the Wayzgoose Press was established.

Her creative skills also included letterpress, writing, woodwork, ceramics and desktop publishing.

== Establishing the press ==
The first project by Hudson and Jarvis was issue one of Wayzgoose Journal, in partnership with James Taylor. It was printed at the Sydney Technical College in 1985, with the help of retired printing teachers Harold Jones and Geoffrey Honeyman, and bound by Hudson and Jarvis. No other issues of Wayzgoose Journal were published.

The Wayzgoose Press established their print workshop in a large shed on their Katoomba property. They started with an Alexandra platen press and over time bought three letterpress proof-presses: a Western 4C, a Vandercook and a Fag.

== Private Impressions series ==
Private Impressions was a series of eight monographs about printing and book arts. They were released in two batches (1–4) and (5–8) between 1989 and 2001. The first number (printed in 1989) is co-authored; the next four are written by Mike Hudson and the last three are written by Jadwiga Jarvis. They were divided into two sets of four, with a small number of each set produced as a deluxe edition.

== Use of Australian writing ==
After an unsuccessful attempt in 1994 to procure permission to work with an excerpt of Ulysses by James Joyce (working title, Molly Bloom, inspired by the experience of printing The Cure), it was suggested by a friend that Jarvis and Hudson should explore Australian performance poetry and forwarded a recording of Jas H. Duke's Dada Kampfen um Leben und Tod (Dada's life and death struggle). As avid jazz fans, they were excited by the thought of translating performance onto page, and developed a mutable concertina book structure with a visual exploration of typography that would be applied to all of their books from that point onwards. They used only Australian literature: poetry by Ken Bolton, Pi O, fiction by George Alexander, and a play by Noëlle Janaczewska. These last five books were their most successful publications in terms of sales and reception.

== The Wayzgoose Affair (2007) ==
In 2007 Jadwiga Jarvis self-published a commercial "biobibliography" of the Wayzgoose Press, called The Wayzgoose Affair. Written in a conversational style, it discusses the workings, correspondence and output of the press, finishing at the decision to stop printing fine press book projects. The format is a full-colour large-scale hardback with dustjacket, with 500 copies printed.

== Books of the Wayzgoose Press ==
Date	Title	Author	Edition	Process
1985	Wayzgoose: The Australian journal of book arts	Various	450	Codex: letterpress, photography, swatch samples.
1989	The Van Diemen's Land Warriors	Pindar Juvenal	50	Codex: letterpress, linocut.
1989	As Dead as the Proverbial...	Jarvis/Hudson	75	Codex: letterpress, linocut.
1989	Private Impressions/December 1989	Jarvis/Hudson	100	Chapbook: letterpress, linocut, wood engraving, woodcut.
1990	Bound for the goldfields : a true account of a journey from Melbourne to Castlemaine / by a carrier of supplies to the goldfields	Samuel Rinder	55	Concertina: letterpress, linocut, wood engraving.
1991	The Isle of Pines	Henry Neville	55	Codex: letterpress, 3-col linocut.
1992	The Cure	Jyoti Brunsdon	55	Codex: letterpress.
1992	The Auld Shop and the New: written specially for "The Chief", George Robertson of Angus & Robertson as some slight acknowledgement of and small return for his splendid generosity during years of trouble and addressed to Donald Angus	Henry Lawson	70	Codex: letterpress, 2-colour wood engraving
1993	All the Manly Tales	Jyoti Brunsdon	50	Gatefold chapbook: letterpress, linocut and collagraph
1993	A Bookseller's Diary	Ross Burnet	55	Codex: letterpress, linocut, reproduced pen & ink sketches
1994	The Bishops' Brothels: a modern commentary on the original 15th century ordinances established to regulate the Southwark brothels of the Bishops of Winchester	Brigid Gaffikin, edited by Mike Hudson	20	Codex: letterpress, hand-coloured linocuts
1996	The Collected Private Impressions : a collection of four monographs about printing and other book arts 1–4	Jarvis/Hudson	50	Chapbooks: letterpress, linocut, woodcut, wood engraving, stencil print
1996	The Collected Private Impressions : a collection of four monographs about printing and other book arts vol 1 [1–4]	Jarvis/Hudson	10	Deluxe edition. Chapbooks: letterpress, linocut, woodcut, wood engraving, stencil print
1997	Dada kampfen um Leben und Tod : a prose poem	Jas H. Duke	34	Concertina: multi-coloured letterpress
1998	the terrific days of summer	Ken Bolton	35	Concertina: letterpress, monoprint, linocut
1999	Ockers! A poem	Pi O	40	Concertina: letterpress, linocut
2000–01	The Collected Private Impressions : a collection of four monographs about printing and other book arts 5–8	Jarvis/Hudson	60	Chapbooks: letterpress, linocut, woodcut, wood engraving, stencil print
2000–01	The Collected Private Impressions : a collection of four monographs about printing and other book arts vol 2 [5–8]	Jarvis/Hudson	15	Deluxe edition. Chapbooks: letterpress, linocut, woodcut, wood engraving, stencil print
2002	Orpheus through the Rear-vision Mirror	George Alexander	32	Concertina: letterpress, monoprints from various materials, papercut
2006	Dorothy Lamour's life as a phrase book	Noëlle Janaczewska	30	Concertina: letterpress, linocut
2018	The Battle of Poitiers: a suite of 7 wood engravings	Michael Hudson	10	Folio: letterpress, wood engravings

While the Wayzgoose Press ceased printing books in the mid-2000s, they continued to plan and print annual broadsides (single-sheet posters) until 2020.

=== Broadsides of the Wayzgoose Press ===
All the broadsides listed below are hand-printed in limited editions. Many were printed twice: a small edition for sale, and a larger edition to send to the annual Typomania event. According to the National Library of Australia, "Typomania is an annual printfest held in the Hans-Hergot Thurm in Uelzen, Germany for hand-press printers, printmakers and artists. The participants set and print their individual interpretations on a selected theme, some being: Globalisation (1999), Slowness (2001), Hans Hergot (2002), Water (2004), Super size me (2006), Corruption (2008), The Empire of shame [Inequality] (2009). The bulk of each edition is distributed among the participants, each given three portfolios which contains one of each contributor's print with only a few portfolios available for sale. Only entire portfolios can be purchased. The annual event began in 1987. Wayzgoose has been an absentee participant since 1992." All Wayzgoose broadsides use handset letterpress with multiple layers of linocut or wood engraving illustration.

Date	Title	Edition
1988	Samuel Pepys, Booklover and Diarist 1633–1703	45
1988	On Ink	30
1989	As Dead as the Proverbial	20
1990	Slaves! A letter from a gentleman in Barbados first published in the Whitehall Evening-Post, September 1750	100
1991	Wolfgang Amadeus Mozart 1756–1791	50
1991	Leura 1891–1991: a centenary broadsheet commemorating the founding of Leura Village	50
1992	Censorship	55
1993	Typography	450
1993	Germany	60
1995	J'ACCUSE! Lettre au President de la Republique	50
1996	Microtots / Typomania X	20
1997	A Book-person's idioticon	50
1997	Globalisation / Typomania XI	20, 100
1997	The China Trade: What price Johnnie?	20
1997	One Nation is an Oxleymoron	75
1997	Report of the melancholy state of the Australian labour market : being an extract from a letter sent to Chambers' Edinburgh journal by a gentleman in Melbourne	75
1998	Wayzgoose / A Printer's Picnic	75
1998	Lead Ain't Dead	25, 100
1999	Wayzgoose / A Printer's Picnic (special run for Matrix Journal)	850
1999	Globalisation / Typomania XIII	25, 60
1999	Melbourne Book Fair: technology breakthrough announcing the new Browse Oriented Organised Knowledge device otherwise known as the book	20
2000	Forum Book Art: 100th exhibition	50
2000	Adventure and art: commemorating the 600th anniversary of the birth of Johann Gutenberg	25
2000	A chain reaction to the GST	20
2000	Sanctions	20, 70
2001	Slowness / Typomania XV	20
2002	Ex voto Hans Hergot, executed 1527 /Typomania XVI	6, 70
2002	War & Peace	10, 70
2003	Reform //Typomania XVII	15, 60
2003	Since competition is an event that creates more losers than winners	15, 60
2004	Water / Typomania XVIII	15, 70
2004	Hobgoblins	20
2005	Hidden Agenda / Typomania XIX	10, 80
2006	Global Warming / Typomania XX	80
2007	What do we want? No more of this shit / Typomania XXI, was braucht der Mensch?	10, 65
2008	Corruption / Typomania XXII	10, 65
2009	Inequality / Typomania XXIII	10, 65
2010	Lost in Translation / Typomania XXIV	10, 65
2011	Democracy / Anarchy / Typomania XXV	10, 65
2012	Euronomics: European financial restructuring / Typomania XXVI	10, 65
2013	EU-Turn: Summary of five top aims of the European Union/ Typomania XXVII	10, 65
2014	Whatever happened to...? Typomania XXVIII	10, 65
2015	iShop: Our children deserve better than this/ Typomania XXIX	10, 65
2016	Deja vu / Typomania XXX	10, 65
2017	Sane Judgement Typomania XXXI	10, 65
2018	Me Too/ Typomania XXXII	10, 65
2019	Death / Typomania XXXIII	10, 65
2020	How Dare You	unfinished

== Collections ==
Wayzgoose Press books and broadsides are held in the following institutional collections:

- UK: The Victoria & Albert Museum, British Library, Manchester City Library, Scottish National Library.
- Europe: Museum of the Book (the Hague), Forum Book Art (Hamburg).
- USA: National Gallery of Art Library (Washington), the university libraries of Yale, Stanford, Pittsburgh, Utah, Ohio and Louisiana, the Rochester Institute of Technology, California Polytechnic State Kennedy Library, New York Public Library, Rare Books Division of the Library of Congress, and the Ruth and Marvin Sackner Archive of Concrete and Modern Poetry.
- South Africa: Jack Ginsberg Collection.
- New Zealand: The National Library, Auckland Public Library, University of Otago Library.
- Australia: State Libraries of New South Wales, Victoria, Queensland, South Australia; The National Library of Australia; the libraries of Monash University, Sydney University, University of South Australia.

Wayzgoose Press work is also held in private collections around the world.
